= Varanasi–Chhapra line =

Railway route on the North Eastern Railway section of Indian Railways

Varanasi–Chhapra line with Aunrihar–Mau–Phephna branch line
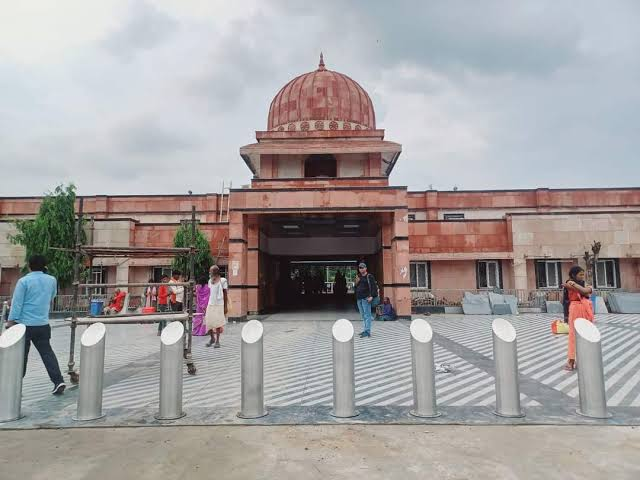
- Ballia railway station

Overview
- Status: Operational
- Owner: Indian Railways
- Locale: Gangetic Plain in Uttar Pradesh and Bihar
- Termini: Varanasi Junction; Chhapra Junction

Service
- Operator: North Eastern Railway

History
- Opened: 15 March 1909 (main); 15 March 1899 (branch)

Technical
- Line length: Main line 206 km (128 mi); Aunrihar–Mau–Phephna branch line 118 km (73 mi)
- Track gauge: 1,676 mm (5 ft 6 in) broad gauge
- Old gauge: 1,000 mm (3 ft 3 3/8 in) metre gauge
- Electrification: Yes
- Operating speed: 100 km/h

The Varanasi–Chhapra line or Chhapra–Varanasi line is a railway route on the North Eastern Railway section of Indian Railways. This route plays an important role in rail transportation of Varanasi division and Azamgarh division of Uttar Pradesh state and Saran division of Bihar state.

The corridor passes through the Gangetic Plain of Uttar Pradesh and Bihar and is 206 km long. It consists of a branch line that starts from Aunrihar Junction, passing through Mau Junction, and ending at Phephna Junction with a stretch of 118 km.

== History ==
The main railway line from Chhapra Junction to Varanasi City was originally built by Bengal and North Western Railway company as a metre-gauge line during the 19th and 20th century. This line was opened in different phases during the construction period.

- The first phase, between Chhapra Junction and Revelganj halt, was opened on 15 April 1891.
- The second phase, between Revelganj Halt and Manjhi, was opened on 1 April 1899.
- The third phase, between Manjhi and Bakulha, was opened on 7 February 1912.
- The fourth phase, between Bakulha and Ballia, was opened on 12 May 1899.
- The fifth phase, between Ballia and Phephna Junction, was opened on 13 March 1899.
- The sixth phase, between Phephna Junction and Ghazipur Ghat, was opened on 10 March 1903.
- The seventh phase, between Ghazipur Ghat and Aunrihar Junction, was opened on 15 March 1909.
- The eighth phase, between Aunrihar Junction and Varanasi City, was also opened on 15 March 1909.

The branch line between Aunrihar Junction and Phephna Junction was opened in two phases during the construction period. The first phase, between Aunrihar Junction and Mau Junction, and the second phase, between Indara Junction and Phephna Junction, were both opened on 15 March 1899.

After that, this line was transferred from the initial jurisdiction to Oudh Tirhut Railway, after the amalgamation of Bengal and North Western Railway, the Tirhut Railway, Mashrak-Thawe Extension Railway, Rohilkund and Kumaon Railway Company on 1 January 1943.

On 14 April 1952, this line was transferred to the jurisdiction of North Eastern Railway, after the amalgamation of Oudh Tirhut Railway and Assam Railway Company.

After that, the conversion into 5 ft 6 in (1,676 mm) broad gauge was completed in phases, starting with the first phase between Varanasi City and Indara Junction at 1990; the second phase, between Aunrihar Junction and Chhapra Junction, in 1996; and the third phase between Indara Junction and Phephna Junction in 1999.

=== Electrification ===
The electrification trial and inspection of the Varanasi–Chhapra line was completed in December 2018.

== Trains passing through this line ==
=== Main ===
- Chhapra–Lucknow Junction Express
- Chhapra–Varanasi City Intercity Express
- Darbhanga–Varanasi City Antyodaya Express
- Dibrugarh–Amritsar Express
- Dibrugarh Rajdhani Express
- Dr. Ambedkar Nagar–Kamakhya Weekly Express
- Ganga Kaveri Express
- Harihar Express
- Lichchavi Express
- Loknayak Express
- Pawan Express
- Raxaul–Lokmanya Tilak Terminus Antyodaya Express
- Sadbhavna Express (via Sagauli)
- Sadbhavna Express (via Sitamarhi)
- Sarnath Express
- Swatantra Senani Express
- Tapti Ganga Express

=== Branch ===
- Chauri Chaura Express
- Durg–Nautanwa Express (via Varanasi)
- Gorakhpur–Manduadih Intercity Express
- Gorakhpur–Pune Weekly Express
- Kashi Express
- Krishak Express
- Shalimar (Howrah) Express
