= Chhapra–Varanasi City Intercity Express =

Train in India

Chhapra Jn - Varanasi City Intercity Express
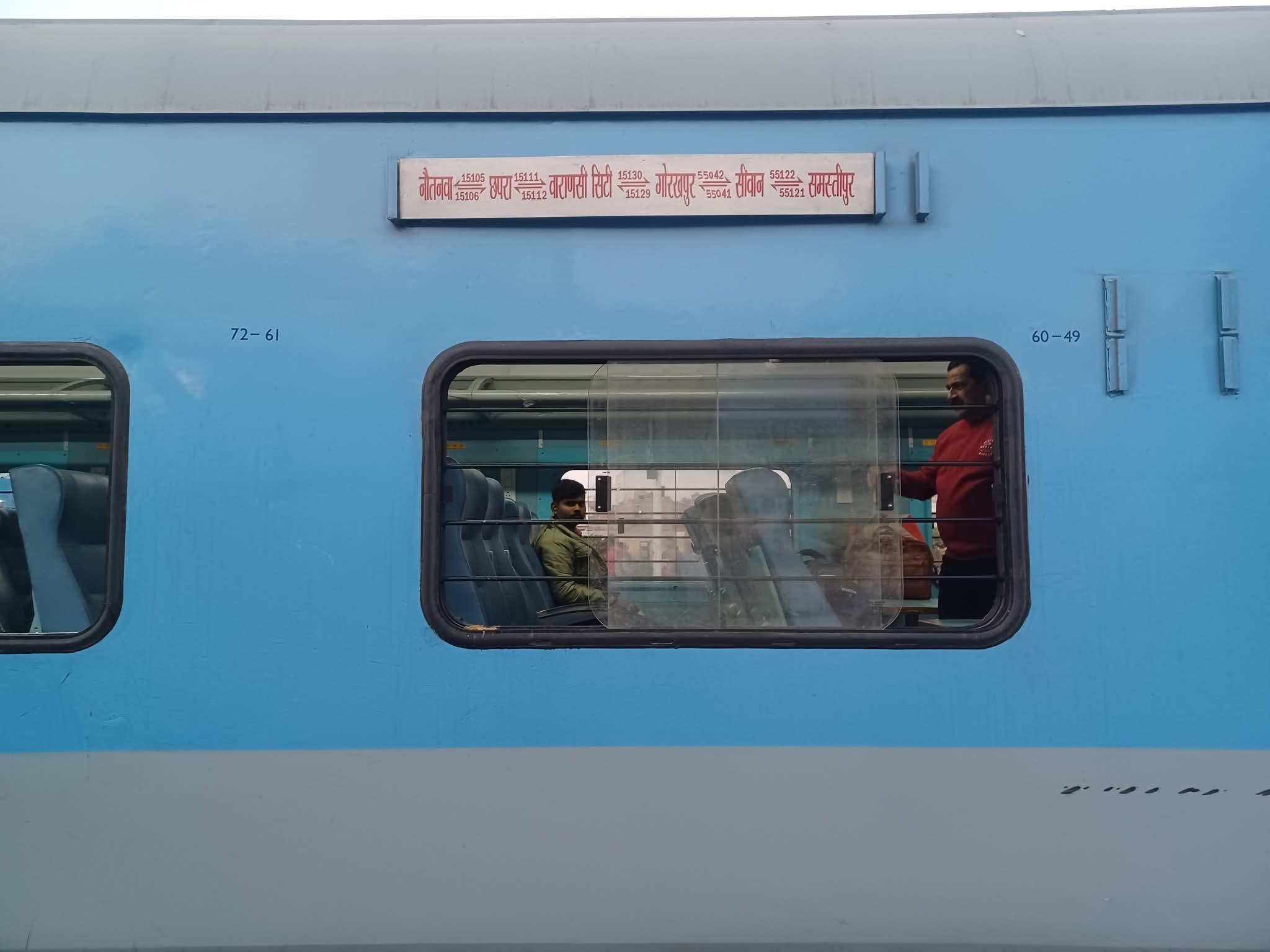

Overview
- Service type: Express
- First service: 4 December 2012; 12 years ago
- Current operator: Northern Eastern Railway

Route
- Termini: Chhapra Junction (CPR); Varanasi City (BCY)
- Stops: 10
- Distance travelled: 224 km (139 mi)
- Average journey time: 4h 55m
- Service frequency: Daily (Note: Runs seven days in a week for every direction.)
- Train number: 15111/15112

On-board services
- Classes: CC, UR/GEN
- Seating arrangements: Yes
- Sleeping arrangements: No
- Catering facilities: On-board Catering; E-Catering
- Entertainment facilities: No
- Baggage facilities: No
- Other facilities: Below the seats

Technical
- Rolling stock: ICF coach
- Track gauge: 1,676 mm (5 ft 6 in)
- Operating speed: 110 km/h (68 mph), including halts

The Chhapra Jn- Varanasi City Intercity Express is an Express train belonging to North Eastern Railway zone that runs between Chhapra Junction and Varanasi City in India. It is currently being operated with 15111/15112 train numbers on a daily basis.

== Service ==
The 15111/Chhapra - Varanasi City Intercity Express has an average speed of 46 km/h and covers 224 km in 4h 55m. 15111/Chhapra - Varanasi City Intercity Express has an average speed of 43 km/h and covers 224 km in 5h 15m.

== Route and halts ==
The important halts of the train are:

- Chhapra Junction
- Suraimanpur
- Ballia
- Phephna Junction
- Chilkahar
- Rasra
- Ratanpura
- Indara Junction
- Mau Junction
- Dullahapur
- Jakhnian
- Sadat
- Aunrihar Junction
- Varanasi city

== Coach composite ==
The train has standard ICF rakes with max speed of 110 kmph. The train consists of 12 coaches :

- 10 General
- 2 SLRD

== Traction ==
Both trains are hauled by a Gonda Loco Shed based WDM 3A diesel locomotive from Chhapra to Varanasi and vice versa.

== See also ==
- Varanasi City railway station
- Chhapra Junction railway station
- Utsarg Express
