= Muftiganj railway station =

Railway station in Uttar Pradesh

Muftiganj Railway Station
- Muftiganj railway station

General information
- Location: Muftiganj, Jaunpur, Uttar Pradesh; India
- Coordinates: 25.706354°N 82.821467°E
- Elevation: 87 metres (285 ft)
- System: Regional rail, Commuter rail station
- Owner: Indian Railways
- Operator: North Eastern Railway zone
- Line: Aunrihar–Kerakat–Jaunpur line
- Platforms: 3
- Tracks: 3
- Connections: Bus, Auto

Construction
- Structure type: At-grade (Indo-Gothic)
- Parking: Yes
- Cycle facilities: Yes
- Accessible: Disabled access

Other information
- Station code: MFJ
- Zone(s): North Eastern Railway zone
- Division(s): Varanasi
- Fare zone: Indian Railways

History
- Opened: 21 March 1904; 122 years ago
- Rebuilt: 2010; 16 years ago
- Former names: Bengal and North Western Railway

Passengers
- 800

Services
| Preceding station | Indian Railways | Following station |
|---|---|---|
| Yadvendranagar towards Jaunpur Junction | North Eastern Railway zone Aunrihar–Kerakat-Jaunpur line | Gangauli towards Aunrihar Junction |
Location
- Location within Uttar Pradesh Location within India

Muftiganj railway station (station code MFJ) is located in Muftiganj, Jaunpur District, Uttar Pradesh, India.

This station is part of North Eastern Railway Zone's Varanasi Division and the Jaunpur–Kerakat–Aunrihar line.

== Overview ==
Muftiganj Railway station is a low-revenue station, serving over 800 passengers and 1 mail/express train and 4 passenger train on daily basis. It is under the administrative control of the North Eastern Railway zone's Varanasi railway division.

It is one of the railway stations in Jaunpur district, Uttar Pradesh, India. It is situated on the south-east side of the city about 16 km from Jaunpur Junction Railway Station. This station is under the Jaunpur–Kerakat–Aunrihar line.

== History ==
The history of Muftiganj Railway Station is closely tied to the development of the rail network in Eastern Uttar Pradesh, particularly the strategic connection between Jaunpur and the Varanasi region.

Early Origins (The Oudh and Rohilkhand Era)

The rail line passing through Muftiganj was originally part of the expansion efforts in the late 19th and early 20th centuries to connect the Oudh and Rohilkhand Railway with the Bengal and North Western Railway. While Jaunpur was already a major hub, smaller stations like Muftiganj were established to serve the agricultural hinterland of the Jaunpur district.

Naming and Local Significance

The station is named after the Mufti Ganj locality. Historically, this area was a center for local administration and trade in the Jaunpur Sultanate era, and the railway station helped maintain its relevance by providing a direct link for local farmers and traders to reach larger markets in Jaunpur and Varanasi.

== Modernization and Upgrades (2010–2026) ==
The 2010 Rebuilding Project

For many decades, the station remained a very basic, small-scale halt. In 2010, the Ministry of Railways initiated a significant rebuilding project.

- Infrastructure Upgrade: The station building was modernized, and platform heights were raised to accommodate modern coaches.
- Purpose: This was part of a larger plan to improve the Aunrihar–Jaunpur corridor, which had long been underserved compared to the main Lucknow–Varanasi lines.

The Gauge Conversion and Electrification (2019–2022) The most transformative period for the station occurred recently:

- Line Doubling: To ease the traffic pressure on the Varanasi–Lucknow main line, the Railway Board approved the doubling of the Aunrihar–Kerakat–Jaunpur section.
- Electrification: Between 2019 and 2022, the tracks were fully electrified. This allowed for the introduction of MEMU (Mainline Electric Multiple Unit) services, which replaced the slower, older diesel-engine passenger trains.
- Modern Era: This upgrade turned Muftiganj from a quiet rural stop into a functional part of a high-capacity "bypass" route for trains moving toward Bihar and West Bengal.

== See also ==
- North Eastern Railway Zone
- Jaunpur Junction
- Aunrihar Junction
- Varanasi Junction
- Jaunpur–Kerakat–Aunrihar line
