= Faridaha halt railway station =

Railway station in Uttar Pradesh

Faridaha Halt

General information
- Location: Faridaha, Khanpur, Ghazipur, Uttar Pradesh; India
- Coordinates: 25.558146°N 83.125096°E
- Elevation: 85 metres (279 ft)
- System: Regional rail, Commuter rail station
- Owner: Indian Railways
- Operator: North Eastern Railway zone
- Line: Aunrihar–Kerakat–Jaunpur line
- Platforms: 2
- Tracks: 2
- Connections: Bus, Auto

Construction
- Structure type: At-grade (Indo-Gothic)
- Parking: Yes
- Cycle facilities: Yes
- Accessible: Disabled access

Other information
- Station code: FRDH
- Zone(s): North Eastern Railway zone
- Division(s): Varanasi
- Fare zone: Indian Railways

History
- Opened: 21 March 1904; 122 years ago
- Rebuilt: 2010; 16 years ago
- Former names: Bengal and North Western Railway

Passengers
- 400/Day

Services
Preceding station	Indian Railways	Following station
Dudhaunda towards Jaunpur Junction	North Eastern Railway zone Aunrihar–Kerakat-Jaunpur line	Aunrihar Junction Terminus
Location
- Location within India Location within Uttar Pradesh

Faridaha halt railway station (FRDH) is a passenger rail halt station. The station falls under the administration of Varanasi division, North Eastern Railway zone.
