= Shalimar–Gorakhpur Express =

Train in India

Overview
- Service type: Mail/Express
- Current operator: North Eastern Railway

Route
- Termini: Gorakhpur Junction; Shalimar railway station
- Stops: 13
- Distance travelled: 1,050 kilometres (650 miles)
- Average journey time: 20 hours 15 minutes
- Service frequency: Weekly
- Train number: 15021 / 15022

On-board services
- Classes: AC-II, AC-III, SL, general
- Seating arrangements: Yes
- Sleeping arrangements: Yes
- Catering facilities: Not available

Technical
- Track gauge: 1,676 mm (5 ft 6 in)
- Operating speed: 56 kilometres per hour (35 mph)
Route map
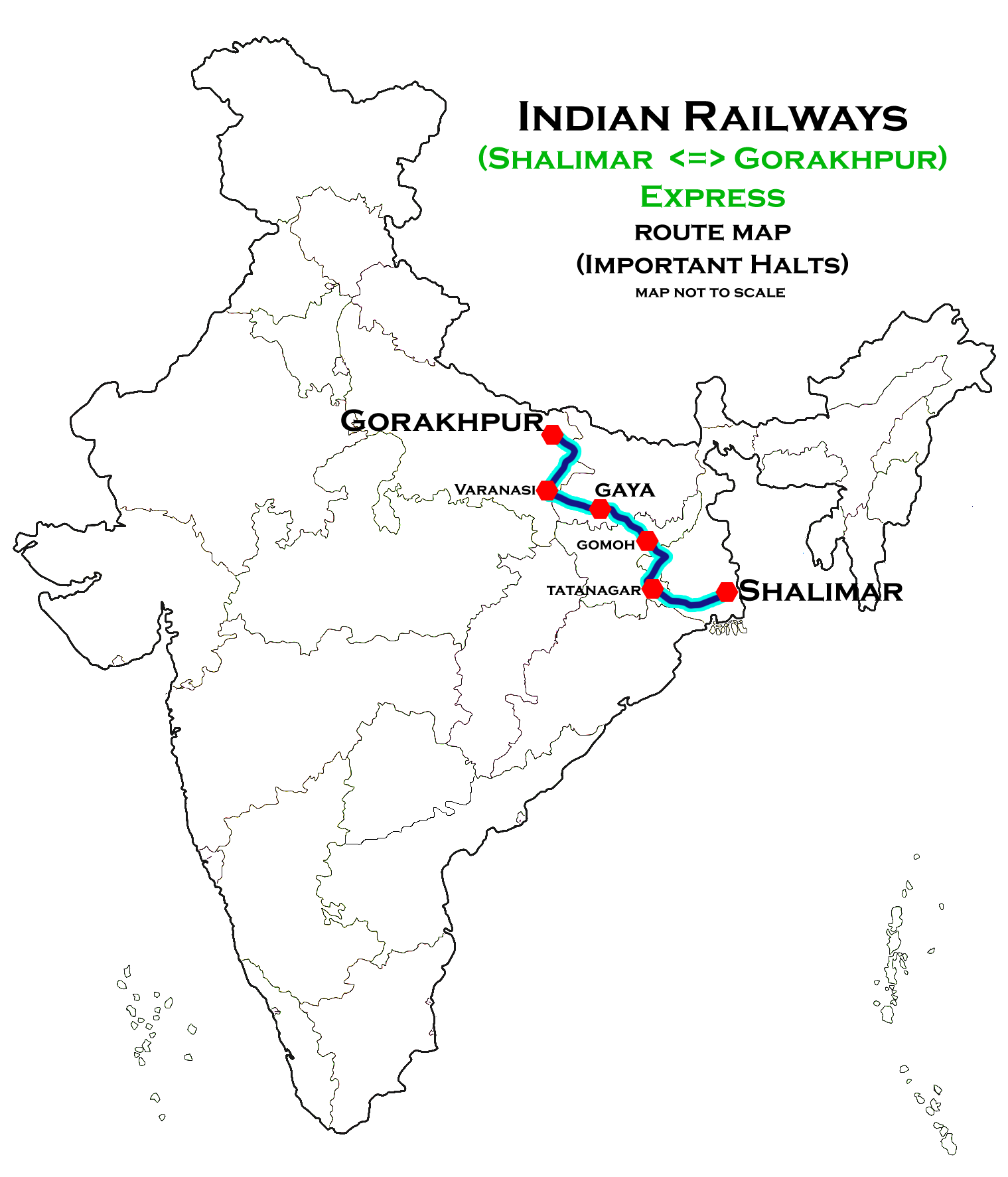

Shalimar–Gorakhpur Express is an Indian Railways train in the North Eastern Railway Zone of Lucknow Division. It operates weekly, departing from Gorakhpur Junction on Monday and from Shalimar railway station on Tuesday. It covers a distance of 1,050 kilometres (650 mi) from Gorakhpur Junction to Shalimar railway station. The Shalimar (Howrah) Express consists of 22 coaches including one AC-I coach, two AC-II coach, nine AC-III coach, five sleeper class coaches, three general (unreserved) coaches and two SLR.

== Schedule ==
Train Number	Station Code	Departure Station	Departure Time	Departure Day	Arrival Station	Arrival Time	Arrival Day
15021	SHM	Shalimar	8:20 PM	Tuesday	Gorakhpur	4:25 PM	Wednesday
15022	GKP	Gorakhpur	1:40 PM	Monday	Shalimar	10:00 AM	Tuesday

== Routes and halts ==
- Shalimar
- Kharagpur Junction
- Ghatsila
- Tatanagar Junction
- Chandil Junction
- Bhojudih Junction
- Mahuda Junction
- Netaji Subhas Chandra Bose Junction Gomoh
- Koderma Junction
- Gaya Junction
- Anugraha Narayan Road
- Dehri-on-Sone
- Sasaram Junction
- Mughalsarai Junction
- Varanasi Junction
- Aunrihar Junction
- Mau Junction
- Belthara Road
- Salempur Junction
- Bhatni Junction
- Deoria Sadar
- Gorakhpur Junction

== Rake Sharing ==
15029/15030 - Gorakhpur-Pune Weekly Express (Via Lucknow)

== Coach composition ==
15021/15022 Shalimar – Gorakhpur Junction – Shalimar Weekly Express has Coach Composition which is reversed at Varanasi Junction:

Loco	1	2	3	4	5	6	7	8	9	10	11	12	13	14	15	16	17	18	19	20	21	22
	SLRD	GEN	GEN	S1	S2	S3	S4	B1	B2	B3	B4	B5	B6	B7	B8	B9	H1	A1	A2	GEN	GEN	EOG

Note-

- EOG refers to End-On Generation coach is a specialized power car equipped with diesel generators, to supply electricity for lighting, fans, and air conditioning.
- SLRD refers to Second Class Luggage cum Guard and Disabled-friendly coach.
- GEN refers to Unreserved cabins.
- Sx refers to Non AC sleeper coach.
- Bx refers to Third AC or AC 3-tier, an air-conditioned sleeping coach.
- Ax refers to Second AC or AC 2-tier, an air-conditioned premium sleeping coach.
- Hx refers to First AC or AC 1-tier, is the most expensive AC sleeping coach with private cabins.

== Journey ==
The express takes around 23 hours and 5 minutes to complete its journey of 1,131 kilometres (703 mi) with an average speed of 49 kilometres per hour (30 mph).
