= Bhadeora =

Bhadewara Bhadeora
- Village
- Location in Uttar Pradesh, India
- Coordinates: 25.745354°N 82.865013°E
- Country: India
- State: Uttar Pradesh
- District: Jaunpur
- Tehsil: Kerakat
- Constituency: Kerakat (SC)

Government
  - Type: Village Panchayat
  - Body: Mrs. Savitri Devi (Village Punchayat Head)

Area
  - Total: 7.4221 km^{2} (2.8657 sq mi)
  - Rank: 2

Population (2011)
  - Total: 4,603
  - Density: 620.2/km^{2} (1,606/sq mi)

Languages
  - Official: Hindi
  - Spoken: Hindi, Bhojpuri (Jaunpuri dialect)
- Time zone: UTC+5:30 (IST)
- PIN: 222133
- Vehicle registration: UP62
- Sex ratio: 1000/943 ♂/♀
- Distance from Varanasi: 65 kilometres (40 mi)
- Distance from Jaunpur: 25 kilometres (16 mi)
- Distance from Ghazipur: 100 kilometres (62 mi)
- Distance from Azamgarh: 80 kilometres (50 mi)
- Lok Sabha constituency: Machhlishahr (Lok Sabha constituency)
- Website: https://jaunpur.nic.in/

Bhadewara or Bhadeora is a village situated in Kerakat sub-district, Jaunpur district, Uttar Pradesh, India.

== History ==
Bhadewara Village was created by a prince Banavari (बनवारी) who left his palace after falling in love with a beautiful girl.

They were two Brothers, Younger was Narapat (नरपत) and Older was Banavari (बनवारी). Narapat founded village Bhuili and Banavari founded Bhadewara.

There is another argument also, Some people's thoughts are different. According to him, This Village is won in a battle with Rai (भूमिहार) by his Ancestor (पूर्वज).

== Education ==
Bhadewara has some schools and other institutions

- Primary School, Bhadewara (In Rajbhar Basti)
- Rastriya Inter College, Bhadewara (Founded By Ramjeet Singh)
- Primary School, Bhadewara (In Harijan Basti)
- Bhuidhar Inter College, Bhadewara (Founded By- Bhuidhar Yadav)
- ITI College, Bhadewara (Founded By Ram-Avatar Singh)

== Transportation ==
=== Rail ===
Jaunpur Junction is a Large railway station which is 21 Kilometers distance from Here and belongs to the North Eastern Railway. The station Code is JNU. Many passenger trains, including expresses, stop at the station. Neighbourhood station is JOP. The closest major station are Dobhi Railway Station, Muftiganj Railway Station and Kerakat Junction.

=== Road ===
Driving distance from Bhadewara to District headquarters Jaunpur is 21 km. Bhadewara is also well connected by road to Gaura Badshahpur, Kerakat, Muftiganj and other town of Kerakat.

=== Air ===
The closest major airport to Kerakat is Lal Bahadur Shastri Airport at Varanasi, 55 km by road. Another nearby airport is Azamgarh Airport.

== Festivals ==
The biggest celebrations in Bhadewara are Durga Pooja & Bharat Milap and the yearly animal fair in Bhadewara village and Godam. Pupils also organise big celebrations on other occasions including Eid al-Fitr, Holi, Ramzan, Diwali and Raksha Bandhan.

== Politics ==
This village is known as political village in entire Assembly.

- First BDC Candidate is Mrs. Sushila Singh, Comes from General Category.
- Second BDC Candidate is Mr. Ram Avatar Yadav, Comes From OBC Category.
- The Current Village Panchayat Sarpanch is Mrs. Savitri Devi, comes from OBC Category.
- Jila Panchayat Election Candidate is Mrs. Reena Chauhan, comes from OBC Category.
- Vidhayak (MLA) Candidate is Mr. Rishabh Thakur, comes from General Category.
- Sansad (MP) Candidate is Mrs. Priya Singh, comes from General category.

== Historic places and sights ==
- Durga Ji Temple
- Kaali Mata Temple
- Deeh Baba Temple
- Sai Baba Temple

== Constituency area ==
There Are One Lok Sabha And Vidhan Sabha Kshetra.

- Machhlishahr (Lok Sabha constituency)
- Kerakat (Vidhan Sabha constituency)

== Demographics ==
Particulars	Total	Male	Female
Total No. of Houses	716	--	--
Population	4,603	2,183	2,420
Child (0–6)	723	381	342
Schedule Caste	1,133	512	621
Schedule Tribe	0	0	0
Literacy	63.35%	75.97%	52.41%
Total Worker	1,807	980	827
Main Worker	1,148	0	0
Marginal Worker	659	354	305
