= Dudhaunda railway station =

Railway station in Uttar Pradesh

General information
- Other names: Patrahi station
- Location: SH-36, Dobhi, Patrahi, Jaunpur, Uttar Pradesh; India
- Coordinates: 25.575037°N 83.079488°E
- Elevation: 85 metres (279 ft)
- System: Regional rail, Light rail and Commuter rail station
- Owner: Indian Railways
- Operator: North Eastern Railway zone
- Line: Aunrihar-Kerakat-Jaunpur line
- Platforms: 2
- Tracks: 2
- Connections: Bus, Auto

Construction
- Structure type: At-grade (Indo-Gothic)
- Parking: Yes
- Cycle facilities: Yes
- Accessible: Disabled access

Other information
- Station code: DDNA
- Zone(s): North Eastern Railway zone
- Division(s): Varanasi
- Fare zone: Indian Railways

History
- Opened: 21 March 1904; 122 years ago
- Rebuilt: 2010; 16 years ago
- Former names: Bengal and North Western Railway

Passengers
- 750/Day

Services
Preceding station	Indian Railways	Following station
Dobhi towards Jaunpur Junction	North Eastern Railway zone Aunrihar–Kerakat-Jaunpur line	Faridaha Halt towards Aunrihar Junction
Location
- Location within Uttar Pradesh Location within India

Dudhaunda railway station (DDNA) is a passenger rail station serving the village of Patrahi and nearby villages like Bisauri, Kopa It is situated 47 kilometres (29 mi) from Jaunpur Junction.This station is situated at Saidpur–Khajurhat road, where people can get easily trains for such cities. It is a very famous and small station of this area.

== Outline ==
Dudhaunda is one of the railway stations on the Aunrihar–Jaunpur line section. The station falls under the administration of Varanasi division, North Eastern Railway zone.

== History ==
This station Dudhaunda was made on 21 March 1904 when Aunrihar–Kerakat–Jaunpur line was opened under the administration of Bengal and North Western Railway.

== Trains ==
- GONDIA–BJU EXPRESS
- JNU–ARJ PASSENGER
- ARJ–JNU PASSENGER
- GCT–BSB DMU
- BSB–GCT DMU

== See also ==
- Bengal and North Western Railway
- North Eastern Railway zone
- Oudh and Tirhut Railway
