= Loknayak Express =

Train in India

Overview
- Service type: Express
- First service: 22 March 2014; 12 years ago
- Current operator: North Eastern Railway

Route
- Termini: Chhapra Junction (CPR); Old Delhi Junction (DLI)
- Stops: 20
- Distance travelled: 1,000 km (621 mi)
- Average journey time: 23 hrs 50 mins
- Service frequency: Weekly (Note: Runs one day in a week for every direction.)
- Train number: 15115 / 15116

On-board services
- Classes: AC 2 tier, AC 3 tier, Sleeper class, General Unreserved
- Seating arrangements: No
- Sleeping arrangements: Yes
- Catering facilities: On-board catering, E-catering
- Observation facilities: Large windows
- Baggage facilities: No
- Other facilities: Below the seats

Technical
- Rolling stock: LHB coach
- Track gauge: 1,676 mm (5 ft 6 in)
- Operating speed: 42 km/h (26 mph) average including halts.

The 15115 / 15116 Loknayak Express is an Express train belonging to North Eastern Railway zone that runs between Chhapra Junction and Old Delhi in India. It is currently being operated with 15115/15116 train numbers on a weekly basis.

This train is named after Jayaprakash Narayan, a freedom fighter and political leader who remembered especially for leading the mid-1970s opposition against Prime Minister Indira Gandhi, for whose overthrow he called a "total revolution". Lok Nayak means The People's Hero.

== Service ==
The 15115/Loknayak Express has an average speed of 41 km/h and covers 1000 km in 24h 40m. The 15116/Loknayak Express has an average speed of 43 km/h and covers 1000 km in 23h 20m.

== Route and halts ==
The important halts of the train are:

- Chhapra Junction
- Ballia
- Ghazipur City
- Aunrihar Junction
- Dobhi
- Kerakat
- Jaunpur Junction
- Shahganj Junction
- Faizabad Junction
- Lucknow Charbagh
- Hardoi
- Shahjahanpur
- Chandausi Junction
- Moradabad Junction
- Hapur Junction
- Ghaziabad Junction
- Delhi Shahdara Junction
- Old Delhi Junction

== Coach composition ==
The train has standard ICF rakes with a maximum speed of 110 km/h. The train consists of 17 coaches:

- 1 AC II Tier
- 2 AC III Tier
- 6 Sleeper coaches
- 3 General Unreserved
- 2 Seating cum Luggage Rake

== Traction ==
Both trains are hauled by a Kanpur Loco Shed-based WAP-7 electric locomotive from Chhapra to Old Delhi and vice versa.

== Direction reversal ==
The train reverses its direction 1 times:

- Jaunpur Junction
- Ayodhya Junction

== See also ==
- Chhapra Junction railway station
- Old Delhi railway station
- Mahamana Express
- Lokmanya Express
