= Gangauli Halt railway station =

Railway station in Uttar Pradesh

Gangauli Halt
- Gangauli Halt Railway Station

General information
- Location: Gangauli, Kerakat, Jaunpur, Uttar Pradesh; India
- Coordinates: 25.665981°N 82.866223°E
- Elevation: 85 metres (279 ft)
- System: Regional rail, Commuter rail station
- Owner: Indian Railways
- Operator: North Eastern Railway zone
- Line: Aunrihar–Kerakat–Jaunpur line
- Platforms: 2
- Tracks: 2
- Connections: Bus, Auto

Construction
- Structure type: At-grade (Indo-Gothic)
- Parking: Yes
- Cycle facilities: Yes
- Accessible: Disabled access

Other information
- Station code: GNGL
- Zone(s): North Eastern Railway zone
- Division(s): Varanasi
- Fare zone: Indian Railways

History
- Opened: 21 March 1904; 122 years ago
- Rebuilt: 2010; 16 years ago
- Former names: Bengal and North Western Railway

Passengers
- 300

Services
Preceding station	Indian Railways	Following station
Muftiganj towards Jaunpur Junction	North Eastern Railway zone Aunrihar–Kerakat-Jaunpur line	Kerakat towards Aunrihar Junction
Location
- Location within India Location within Uttar Pradesh

Gangauli Halt railway station (station code GNGL) is located in Kerakat, Jaunpur District, Uttar Pradesh, India.

This station is part of North Eastern Railway Zone's Varanasi Division and the Jaunpur–Kerakat–Aunrihar line.

== Overview ==
Gangauli Halt Railway station is a low-revenue station, serving over 300 passengers and 4 passenger train on daily basis. It is under the administrative control of the North Eastern Railway zone's Varanasi railway division.

It is one of the railway stations in Jaunpur district, Uttar Pradesh, India. It is situated on the east side of the city about 23 km from Jaunpur Junction Railway Station. This station is under the Jaunpur–Kerakat–Aunrihar line.

== History ==
Gangauli Halt railway station (GNGL) has a history spanning over 120 years, evolving from a small branch line stop into a modernized electrified halt.

Establishment and Early Era (1904)

- Opening: The station was officially opened on 21 March 1904.
- Original Operator: It was established by the Bengal and North Western Railway (BNWR) as part of the Aunrihar–Kerakat–Jaunpur route.
- Original Gauge: At its inception, it was a metre-gauge (1,000 mm) line intended to connect major trade hubs in Uttar Pradesh.
- Architecture: The station's structure type is described as At-grade (Indo-Gothic).

== Modernization and Upgrades (2010–2026) ==
The station has undergone significant technical transformations in the 21st century:

- Gauge Conversion (2010–2011): The entire line was converted from metre-gauge to broad-gauge (1,676 mm). The station was essentially rebuilt during this period to accommodate the new infrastructure.
- Electrification (2019): The single-line section passing through Gangauli was electrified in 2019, allowing for more efficient electric locomotive-led trains.
- Doubling (2022): A new double electric line was constructed and completed by April 2022, significantly increasing the track capacity for the route.
- Platform Expansion: As of 2026, the station operates with 2 platforms, reflecting its growth from a single-track halt to a double-track station.

== See also ==
- North Eastern Railway Zone
- Jaunpur Junction
- Aunrihar Junction
- Varanasi Junction
- Jaunpur–Kerakat–Aunrihar line
