= Patrahi, Jaunpur =

Patrahi
- Village
- Location in Jaunpur, Uttar Pradesh, India Patrahi (India)
- Country: India
- State: Uttar Pradesh
- District: Jaunpur
- Tehsil: Kerakat
- Block: Dobhi

Demographics

Languages
  - Official: Hindi
  - Other: Bhojpuri (Jaunpuri), English
- Time zone: UTC+5:30 (IST)
- Vehicle registration: UP-62

Patrahi is a small village/market in Dobhi Block Kerakat taluk, in Jaunpur district, Uttar Pradesh State, India. It comes under Patarahi Panchayath. It belongs to Varanasi Division. It is located 49 km (30 mi) towards East from District headquarters Jaunpur and 288 km (179 mi) from the state capital Lucknow. The nearest town is Kerakat, while and Varanasi and Jaunpur are the nearest cities. It has a police outpost in the Chandwak police station area.

== Transportation ==
=== Rail ===
Dudhaunda Railway Station(Patrahi Station), Dobhi Railway Station and Kerakat railway station are the nearest railway stations. Dobhi is a stop of many trains for big cities such as Mumbai, Delhi and other cities.

=== Road ===
Aside from being connected to Jaunpur, Patrahi is also connected by road to Varanasi, Azamgarh, Ghazipur and other cities of Uttar Pradesh.

=== Air ===
The closest major airport to Patrahi is Lal Bahadur Shastri Airport at Babatpur, Varanasi, 45 km by road. Another nearby airport is Azamgarh Airport.

== Constituency area ==
The village falls under Machhlishahr constituency for national elections and Kerakat constituency for state elections.

== Demographics ==
As of the 2011 Census of India total geographical area of village is 126 hectares. Patrahi has a total population of 1,324 of which 617 (46.60%) are males while 707 (53.40%) are females as per Population Census 2011. There are about 207 houses in Patrahi village. Kerakat is nearest town to Patrahi.
