= Chhapra–Lucknow Junction Express =

Train in India

Overview
- Service type: Express
- First service: 2 March 2015; 10 years ago
- Current operator: North Eastern Railway zone

Route
- Termini: Chhapra Junction (CPR); Lucknow Junction (LJN)
- Stops: 11
- Distance travelled: 537 km (334 mi)
- Average journey time: 13h 25m
- Service frequency: Daily (Note: Runs seven days in a week for every direction.)
- Train number: 15053/15054

On-board services
- Classes: AC 2 tier, AC 3 tier, Sleeper class, General Unreserved
- Seating arrangements: No
- Sleeping arrangements: Yes
- Catering facilities: On-board catering E-catering
- Observation facilities: LHB coach
- Entertainment facilities: No
- Baggage facilities: No
- Other facilities: Below the seats

Technical
- Rolling stock: 2
- Track gauge: 1,676 mm (5 ft 6 in)
- Operating speed: 40 km/h (25 mph), including halts

The Chhapra–Lucknow Junction Express is an Express train belonging to North Eastern Railway zone that runs between Chhapra Junction and Lucknow Junction in India. It is currently being operated with 15053/15054 train numbers on a daily basis.

== Service ==
The 15053/Chhapra–Lucknow Express has an average speed of 40 km/h and covers 537 km in 13h 25m. The 15054/Lucknow Jn–Chhapra Express has an average speed of 37 km/h and covers 537 km in 14h 20m.

== Route and halts ==
Notable halts of the train are:

- Chhapra Junction
- Ballia
- Yusufpur
- Ghazipur City
- Aunrihar Junction
- Varanasi Junction
- Jaunpur Junction
- Shahganj Junction
- Ayodhya Junction
- Faizabad Junction
- Gomti Nagar
- Badshahnagar
- Lucknow Junction

== Coach composition ==
The train has standard LHB rakes with a max speed of 110 kmph. The train consists of 17 coaches:

- 2 AC II Tier
- 8 AC III Tier
- 6 Sleeper coaches
- 4 General Unreserved
- 2 Seating cum Luggage Rake

== Traction ==
Both trains are hauled by a Gonda Loco Shed-based WDM-3A diesel locomotive from Chhapra to Lucknow and vice versa.

== Rake sharing ==
The train currently shares its rake with Utsarg Express after the RSA of Utsarg Express was broken with Tatanagar–Chhapra Express because of the latter's extension to Thawe Junction.

== See also ==
- Chhapra Junction railway station
- Lucknow Junction railway station
