= Saraibiru =

Saraibeeru
- Village
- Location in Jaunpur, Uttar Pradesh, India Saraibeeru (India)
- Coordinates: 25.640°N 82.919°E
- Country: India
- State: Uttar Pradesh
- District: Jaunpur
- Tehsil: Kerakat

Government
  - Type: Gram Panchayat
- Elevation: 83 m (272 ft)

Population
  - Total: 2,963

Languages
  - Official: Hindi
- Time zone: UTC+5:30 (IST)
- PIN: 222142
- Vehicle registration: UP62
- Sex ratio: 1540/1423 ♂/♀
- Lok Sabha constituency: Machhlishahr (Lok Sabha constituency)
- Vidhan Sabha constituency: Kerakat (Vidhan Sabha constituency)
- Distance from Kerakat: 0 kilometres (0 mi)
- Distance from Jaunpur District: 30 kilometres (19 mi)
- Website: https://jaunpur.nic.in/

Saraibeeru is a village in India, located near the Kerakat in the Jaunpur district in the state of Uttar Pradesh. The village is 30 km (19 mi) from Jaunpur.

Saraibiru has a railway station Name Kirakat railway station connected to Aunrihar Junction and Jaunpur Junction. The village has a Post Office, water tank and Panchayat Bhawan. The Pin Code is 222142.

== Demographics ==
According to the 2011 Census of India, Saraibeeru comprised 452 families. The total population was 2963, of which 1540 were male while 1423 were female. There were 419 children aged 0–6 and the Average Sex Ratio was 924, which was higher than the Uttar Pradesh state average of 912. The Child Sex Ratio was 887, lower than the Uttar Pradesh average of 902.

Saraibeeru had a higher literacy rate than the Uttar Pradesh average in 2011, being 80.90% compared to 67.68%. Male literacy was 87.41% and female literacy rate was 73.90%.
