= Yadvendranagar railway station =

Railway station in Uttar Pradesh

Yadvendranagar Railway Station
- Yadvendranagar railway station

General information
- Location: Yadvendranagar, Jaunpur, Uttar Pradesh; India
- Coordinates: 25.7616°N 82.7431°E
- Elevation: 88 metres (289 ft)
- System: Regional rail, Commuter rail station
- Owner: Indian Railways
- Operator: North Eastern Railway zone
- Line: Jaunpur-Kerakat-Aunrihar line
- Platforms: 2
- Tracks: 2
- Connections: Bus, Auto

Construction
- Structure type: At-grade (Indo-Gothic)
- Parking: Yes
- Cycle facilities: Yes
- Accessible: Disabled access

Other information
- Station code: YDV
- Zone(s): North Eastern Railway zone
- Division(s): Varanasi
- Fare zone: Indian Railways

History
- Opened: 21 March 1904; 122 years ago
- Rebuilt: 2010; 16 years ago
- Former names: Bengal and North Western Railway

Passengers
- 350

Services
Preceding station	Indian Railways	Following station
Jaunpur Junction Terminus	North Eastern Railway zone Aunrihar–Kerakat-Jaunpur line	Gangauli towards Aunrihar Junction
Location
- Location within India Location within Uttar Pradesh

Yadvendranagar railway station (station code YDV) is located in Yadvendranagar, Jaunpur District, Uttar Pradesh, India.

This station is part of North Eastern Railway Zone's Varanasi Division and the Jaunpur–Kerakat–Aunrihar line.

== Overview ==
Yadvendranagar Railway station is a low-revenue station, serving over 350 passengers and 4 passenger train on daily basis. It is under the administrative control of the North Eastern Railway zone's Varanasi railway division.

It is one of the railway stations in Jaunpur district, Uttar Pradesh, India. It is situated on the east side of the city about 6 km from Jaunpur Junction Railway Station. This station is under the Jaunpur–Kerakat–Aunrihar line.

== History ==
The history of Yadvendra Nagar Railway Station (YDV) is closely tied to the colonial development of the North Eastern Railway and the local Royal lineage of Jaunpur.

Colonial Origins (1904)

The station was originally opened on 21 March 1904. It was established as part of a new branch line constructed by the Bengal and North Western Railway (BNWR), a private company that operated a vast meter-gauge network in North India. This line connected Aunrihar to Jaunpur via Kerakat, providing a crucial link between the Varanasi–Chhapra and Varanasi–Lucknow lines.

Naming and Royal Heritage

The station is named in honour of Raja Yadavendra Dutt Dubey (1918–1999), the 11th and last titular Maharaja of Jaunpur.

- Political Legacy: Raja Yadvendra was a prominent political figure, serving as a Member of Parliament (Lok Sabha) twice and as the Leader of the Opposition in the Uttar Pradesh Legislative Assembly.
- Cultural Impact: His family played a significant role in the region's history, often hosting major political figures like Atal Bihari Vajpayee and Deendayal Upadhyaya at their Haveli in Jaunpur.

Administrative Evolution

Over time, the station's management shifted from the private BNWR to the state-owned Indian Railways. It now falls under the Varanasi Division of the North Eastern Railway (NER) zone.

== Modern Redevelopment (2010–Present) ==
The station has undergone significant infrastructure upgrades over the last two decades to meet modern rail standards:

- Rebuilding (2010): The station was significantly rebuilt in 2010 to improve passenger facilities.
- Electrification & Doubling: Originally a single-line section, the route was electrified in March 2019. Following this, the doubling of the track between Muftiganj and Jaunpur (the section Yadvendra Nagar occupies) was completed around April 2022, transforming it into the double-track station it is today.

== See also ==
- North Eastern Railway Zone
- Jaunpur Junction
- Aunrihar Junction
- Varanasi Junction
- Jaunpur–Kerakat–Aunrihar line
