= Ghazipur City–Shri Mata Vaishno Devi Katra Weekly Express =

Train in India

Ghazipur City-SMVD Katra Weekly Express
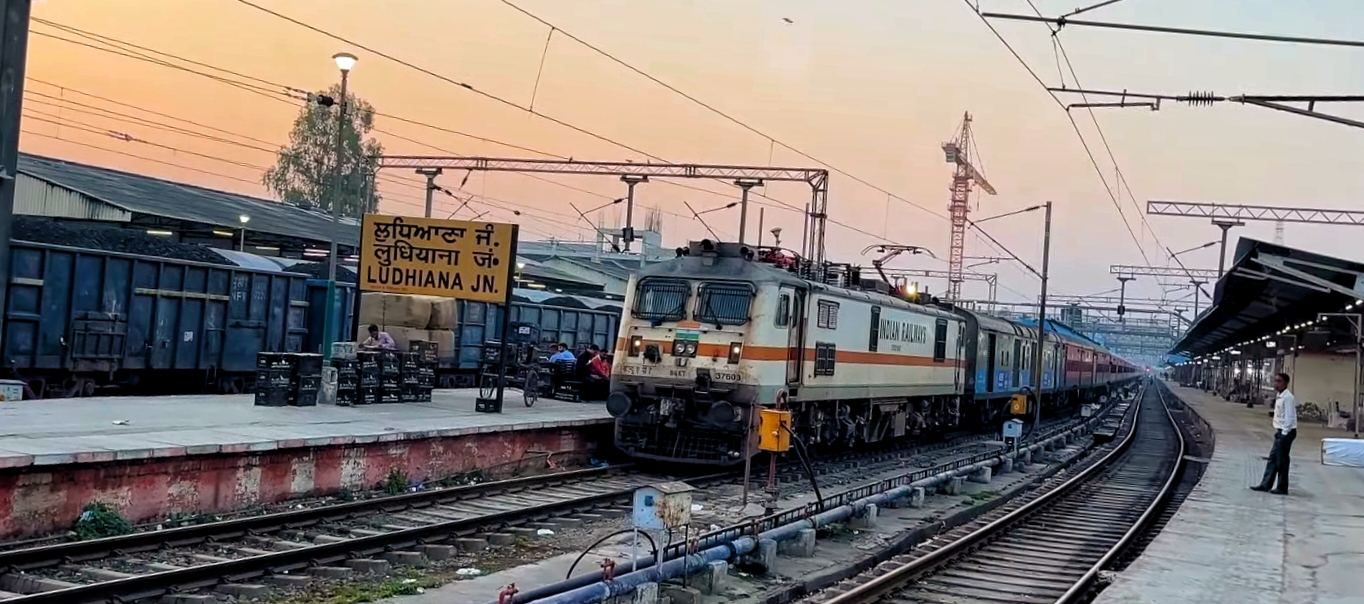
- Ghazipur City-SMVD Katra Weekly Express At Ludhiana Junction

Overview
- Service type: Express
- First service: 20 September 2016; 9 years ago
- Current operator: Northern Railway

Route
- Termini: Ghazipur City (GCT); SMVD Katra (SVDK)
- Stops: 12
- Distance travelled: 1,387 km (862 mi)
- Average journey time: 28 hra 15 mins
- Service frequency: Weekly (Note: Runs one day in a week for every direction.)
- Train number: 14611 / 14612

On-board services
- Classes: AC 2 Tier, AC 3 Tier, Sleeper Class, General Unreserved
- Seating arrangements: No
- Sleeping arrangements: Yes
- Catering facilities: On-board catering, E-catering
- Observation facilities: Large windows
- Baggage facilities: No
- Other facilities: Below the seats

Technical
- Rolling stock: LHB coach
- Track gauge: 1,676 mm (5 ft 6 in)
- Operating speed: 49 km/h (30 mph) average including halts

The 14611 / 14612 Ghazipur City–SMVD Katra Weekly Express is an superfast express train belonging to Northern Railway zone that runs between Ghazipur City and Shri Mata Vaishno Devi Katra in India. It is currently being operated with 14611/14612 train numbers on a weekly basis.

== Service ==
The 14611/Ghazipur City–Shri Mata Vaishno Devi Katra Express has an average speed of 49 km/h and covers 1391 km in 28h 15m. The 14612/Shri Mata Vaishno Devi Katra–Ghazipur City Express has an average speed of 56 km/h and covers 1391 km in 24h 50m.

== Schedule ==
Train number	Station code	Departure station	Departure time	Departure day	Arrival station	Arrival time	Arrival day
14611	GCT	Ghazipur City	8:30 AM	FRI	Shri Mata Vaishno Devi Katra	12:35 PM	SAT
14612	SVDK	Shri Mata Vaishno Devi Katra	5:40 AM	THU	Ghazipur City	6:30 AM	Friday

== Route and halts ==
The important halts of the train are:

- Ghazipur City
- Aunrihar Junction
- Dobhi
- Kerakat
- Jaunpur Junction
- Jaunpur City
- Sultanpur Junction
- Maharaja Bijli Pasi
- Lucknow Charbagh
- Moradabad Junction
- Saharanpur Junction
- Ambala Cantonment Junction
- Ludhiana Junction
- Jalandhar Cantonment
- Pathankot Cantonment
- Jammu Tawi
- Shri Mata Vaishno Devi Katra

== Coach composition ==
The train has standard LHB rakes with a maximum speed of 130 km/h. The train consists of 18 coaches:

- 1 AC II Tier
- 4 AC III Tier
- 7 Sleeper coaches
- 1 Pantry car
- 3 General Unreserved
- 2 End-on Generator

== Traction ==
Both trains are hauled by a Ludhiana Loco Shed-based WAP-7 electric locomotive from Ghazipur City to Lucknow Shri Mata Vaishno Devi Katra for the remainder journey and vice versa.

== See also ==
- Shri Mata Vaishno Devi Katra railway station
- Ghazipur City railway station
