= Aunrihar–Jaunpur line =

Railway line in India

Aunrihar–Kerakat–Jaunpur line
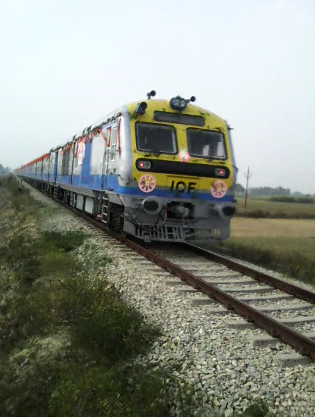
- Ghazipur city-Varanasi Junction DEMU nearby Kerakat Railway station

Overview
- Status: Operational
- Owner: Indian Railways
- Locale: Uttar Pradesh, India
- Termini: Aunrihar Junction; Jaunpur Junction
- Stations: 10
- Website: http://www.ner.indianrailways.gov.in

Service
- Type: Express and Passenger line
- Services: via Kerakat
- Operator: North Eastern Railway zone
- Depot(s): Aunrihar DMU Shed, Saiyedpur E-Loco Shed
- Rolling stock: WDM-2; WDM-3A; WDP-4; WDG-4; WAP-4; WAP-7

History
- Opened: 1904; 122 years ago

Technical
- Line length: 60 km (37 mi)
- Number of tracks: Double line
- Track gauge: 1,676 mm (5 ft 6 in)
- Electrification: Double line Electrified
- Operating speed: 110 km/h (68 mph)
- Highest elevation: 89 m above MSL

The Jaunpur–Kerakat–Aunrihar line is an operating railway line that comes under the jurisdiction of North Eastern Railway zone of Indian Railways in Uttar Pradesh, India. It connects the Varanasi–Lucknow line and Varanasi–Chhapra line which is for reducing the rail traffic burden on Varanasi. It lies on the Gangetic plain.

The line has 8 stations, between its start at Aunrihar Junction to its point of termination at Jaunpur Junction.

In this route Kerakat is the famous station and medium revenue station in Varanasi railway division of North Eastern Railway zone. Many trains are runs from Ghazipur City and Chhapra Junction to Jaunpur Junction and Varanasi Junction through this line. also it connects many big cities as Kanpur, Bareilly, Surat, Mumbai, Durg, Ghaziabad, Faizabad, Delhi, Barauni, Agra, etc.

== Shed/Depot ==
Currently, In this line, it has two types of sheds such as:

=== Aunrihar DMU Shed ===
Union Minister of State for Railways Manoj Sinha handed over two schemes worth Rs 153 crore to his parliamentary constituency Ghazipur. He inaugurated the DEMU shed on Aunrihar Junction. this Demu Shed Served Varanasi Division of NER.

=== Saiyedpur E-Loco-Shed ===
Saiyedpur Bhitri E-loco Shed is 6 km from Aunrihar Junction and 0.5 km From Saiyedpur Bhitri railway station Minister of State for Railways and Minister of State (Independent Charge) Manoj Sinha said that after the formation of AC Electric Locoshed, the name of the Saiyedpur Bhitri, known for the article of Emperor Skanda Gupta, will become immortal in Indian Railways. The Minister of State for Railways was speaking at the foundation stone laying ceremony of AC Locoshed of 100-Loco capacity at Saidpur Bhitari railway station located on Saturday. Said that 100 locos will be maintained here in the initial phase. Later it will be made of 200 people capacity. This E-Loco Shed is under construction. After complete it will serve the Varanasi Division of NER (Gorakhpur) but also whole India.

== Technical information ==
The length of the line is 60 km (37 mi), with the length of the track being 60 km (37 mi). Using 5 ft 6 in (1,676 mm) broad gauge, the rolling stock on the line includes the diesel locomotives; WDM-2, WDM-3A, WDP-4, WDG-4 and electric locomotive;.WAP-7, WAP-4. Since March 2019 the main line is electrified. Double line electrified From Aunrihar to Dobhi was completed in October 2021 and Dobhi-Kerakat Muftiganj Line doubling and electrification completed in April 2022. The maximum operating speed is 110 km/h.

== Stations ==
- Aunrihar Junction (ARJ)
- Faridaha Halt (FRDH)
- Dudhaunda (DDNA)
- Dobhi (DHE)
- Kusarna Halt
- Kerakat (KCT)
- Gangauli halt (GNGL)
- Muftiganj (MFJ)
- Yadvendra Nagar (YDV)
- Jaunpur Junction (JNU)

== Train service ==
Here there are some trains passing through this line:

1. Suhaildev Express
2. Barauni–Gondia Express
3. Loknayak Express
4. Bandra–Ghazipur Express
5. Sadbhavna Express
