= Varanasi City railway station =

Indian railway station

Varanasi City

General information
- Location: NH 2, Jaitpura, Varanasi, Uttar Pradesh; India
- Coordinates: 25.334332°N 83.014485°E
- Elevation: 76.7 m (252 ft)
- System: Indian Railways station
- Owner: Indian Railways
- Operator: North Eastern Railway
- Line: Varanasi–ballia-Chhapra line . Gorakhpur-Mau-Prayagraj main line
- Platforms: 5
- Tracks: 5
- Train operators: Indian Railways
- Connections: Auto rickshaw Bus

Construction
- Structure type: At grade
- Parking: Available
- Cycle facilities: Available
- Accessible: Not available

Other information
- Status: Active
- Station code: BCY
- Zone(s): North Eastern Railway
- Division(s): Varanasi
- Fare zone: North Eastern Railway Zone

Passengers
- 40000
Location
- Location within Varanasi district

Varanasi City railway station is one of the railway stations in Varanasi. It is 4 kilometres (2.5 mi) Northeast of Varanasi Junction railway station, 10 kilometres (6 mi) northeast of Banaras Hindu University and 23 kilometres (14 mi) southeast of Lal Bahadur Shastri Airport. It serves as terminal station due to heavy rush at Varanasi Junction.

== Passenger amenities ==
At Varanasi City railway station, there are five platforms, planning for 8 platforms are already approved. There is one entrance to the station. Because of heavy rush at Varanasi Junction the Railway Board decided to develop Banaras railway station and Varanasi City railway station as satellite stations. Now, Varanasi City is the headquarters station of the North Eastern Railway (Varanasi City Division). Earlier Varanasi Junction was the headquarters of the North Eastern Railway but later North Eastern Railway changed the headquarter. As Varanasi Junction falls under the Northern Railway, Lucknow Charbagh Division. The station is well connected with the cities like Ghazipur, Mau, Darbhanga, Chhapra, Mumbai, Lucknow, Gorakhpur, Kanpur, etc.

== Express trains originating from Varanasi City ==
Train number	Train name	Origin	Destination
15007	Krishak Express	Varanasi City	Lucknow
15552	Varanasi City–Darbhanga Antyodaya Express	Varanasi City	Darbhanga
55132	Varanasi City–Chhapra Intercity Express	Varanasi City	Chhapra
19168	Varanasi City- Ahmedabad Sabarmati Express	Varanasi City	Ahmedabad

== Passenger trains originating from Varanasi City ==
Train number	Train name	Origin	Destination
55014	Passenger	Varanasi City	Chhapra
55120	Passenger	Varanasi City	Gorakhpur
55132	Passenger	Varanasi City	Chhapra
75114	Passenger (DEMU)	Varanasi City	Bhatni
55134	Passenger	Varanasi City	Ballia
63297	Passenger (MEMU)	Varanasi City	Ballia
55136	Passenger	Varanasi City	Azamgarh
55150	Passenger	Varanasi City	Gorakhpur

== See also ==
- Varanasi Junction railway station
- Banaras railway station
- Kashi railway station
- Pandit Deen Dayal Upadhyaya Junction railway station

Preceding station	Indian Railways	Following station
Varanasi Junction towards ?	North Eastern Railway zone Varanasi–ballia-Chhapra line	Sarnath towards ?
