= Utsarg Express =

Train in India

Overview
- Service type: Express
- Locale: Uttar Pradesh & Bihar
- Current operator(s): North Eastern Railway

Route
- Termini: Chhapra Junction (CPR); Farrukhabad Junction (FBD)
- Stops: 31
- Distance travelled: 682 km (424 mi)
- Average journey time: 18 hours 20 minutes
- Service frequency: Daily
- Train number(s): 15083 / 15084

On-board services
- Class(es): AC 3 Tier, AC 2 Tier, Sleeper Class, General Unreserved
- Seating arrangements: Yes
- Sleeping arrangements: Yes
- Catering facilities: E-catering only
- Observation facilities: Large windows
- Baggage facilities: No
- Other facilities: Below the seats

Technical
- Rolling stock: LHB coach
- Track gauge: 1,676 mm (5 ft 6 in)
- Operating speed: 38 km/h (24 mph) average including halts.

The 15083 / 15084 Utsarg Express is a daily Express train of the Indian Railways, running between Chhapra and Farrukhabad (Hindi: फ़र्रूख़ाबाद, Urdu: فرخ آباد).

== Number & Nomenclature ==
The train numbers of the Utsarg Express are:

- 15083 UP: From Chhapra Junction to Farrukhabad – 682 km/18:20 Hrs
- 15084 DN: From Farrukhabad to Chhapra Junction – 682 km/18:00 Hrs

The name Utsarg means Devotion.

== Route & Halts ==
15083– Chhapra Junction to Farrukhabad

Station code	Station name
CPR	Chhapra Junction
GTST	Gautamsthan
MHT	Manjhi
SIP	Suraimanpur
ROI	Reoti
STW	Sahatwar
BUI	Ballia
CHR	Chilkahar
RSR	Rasra
RTP	Ratanpura
IAA	Indara Junction
MAU	Mau Junction
MMA	Muhammadabad
SAA	Sathiaon
AMH	Azamgarh
SMZ	Sarai Mir
KRND	Khorason Road
SHG	Shahganj Junction
ABP	Akbarpur
GGJ	Goshainganj
AY	Ayodhya
FD	Faizabad Junction
RDL	Rudauli
DYD	Daryabad
BBK	Barabanki Junction
BNZ	Badshahnagar
LC	Lucknow City
LJN	Lucknow Junction
ON	Unnao Junction
CNB	Kanpur Central
CPA	Kanpur Anwarganj
KJN	Kannauj
FBD	Farrukhabad Junction

== Coach composition ==
The train consists of a total number of 21 coaches as follows:

- 2 AC II Tier
- 8 AC III Tier
- 6 Sleeper
- 3 Second Sitting
- 1 Unreserved cum Luggage Van
- 1 Power Car (EOG)

== Locomotive ==
- It is hauled by a Izzatnagar-based WDP-4D locomotive end to end
- Loco reversal: Shahganj Junction

== RSA – Rake sharing arrangement ==
This train shared its rake with 18181/18182 Tatanagar–Chhapra Express before COVID-19 pandemic in India, during which the train number of the Utsarg Express was 18191/18192. Later, it began sharing its rake with 15053/15054 Chhapra–Lucknow Junction Express.

From November 2024, the Rake Sharing Arrangement (RSA) of the Utsarg Express has been modified, and it now shares its rake with the 15113/15114 Chhapra–Gomtinagar Express. The primary maintenance (PM) of the train has also shifted from Lucknow Junction (LJN) to Chhapra (CPR).

== Trivia ==
This was the first broad-gauge express train incorporated after broad conversion of section Shahganj-Ballia.

== See also ==
- Kaifiyat Express
- Chhapra Express
