= Chhapra–Mathura Superfast Express =

Train in India

Overview
- Service type: Superfast Express
- Current operator: North Eastern Railway zone

Route
- Termini: Chhapra Junction (CPR); Mathura Junction (MTJ)
- Stops: 20
- Distance travelled: 881 km (547 mi)
- Average journey time: 16h 40m
- Service frequency: Tri-weekly (Note: Runs three days in a week for every direction.)
- Train number: 22531/22532

On-board services
- Classes: AC 2 tier, AC 3 tier, Sleeper class, General Unreserved
- Seating arrangements: No
- Sleeping arrangements: Yes
- Catering facilities: On-board catering E-catering
- Observation facilities: ICF coach
- Entertainment facilities: No
- Baggage facilities: No
- Other facilities: Below the seats

Technical
- Rolling stock: 2
- Track gauge: 1,676 mm (5 ft 6 in)
- Operating speed: 34 km/h (21 mph), including halts

The Chhapra–Mathura Superfast Express is a Superfast Express train belonging to North Eastern Railway zone that runs between Chhapra Junction and Mathura Junction in India. It is currently being operated with 22531/22532 train numbers on a tri-weekly basis.

== Service ==
The 22531/Chhapra–Mathura Superfast Express has an average speed of 53 km/h and covers 881 km in 16h 40m. The 22532/Mathura–Chhapra Superfast Express has an average speed of 50 km/h and covers 881 km in 17h 40m.

== Route and halts ==
The important halts of the train are:

- Chhapra Junction
- Siwan Junction
- Deoria Sadar
- Gorakhpur Junction
- Basti
- Babhnan
- Gonda Junction
- Barabanki Junction
- Lucknow Junction
- Kanpur Central
- Kanpur Anwarganj
- Kannauj
- Farrukhabad Junction
- Kasganj Junction
- Hathras City
- Mathura Junction

== Coach composition ==
The train has standard ICF rakes with a maximum speed of 110 km/h. The train consists of 17 coaches:

- 2 AC III Tier
- 7 Sleeper coaches
- 6 General Unreserved
- 2 Seating cum Luggage Rake

== Traction ==
Currently this train is being hauled with Gonda-based WAP-4 locomotive from Chhapra Junction till Mathura and vice versa.

== See also ==
- Chhapra Junction railway station
- Mathura Junction railway station
