= Aunrihar =

- Town
- Location of Aunrihar in Uttar Pradesh
- Coordinates: 25.32°N 83.11°E
- Country: India
- State: Uttar Pradesh
- District: Ghazipur
- Elevation: 73 m (240 ft)

Languages
  - Official: Hindi
  - Others: Bhojpuri, Urdu
- Time zone: UTC+5:30 (IST)
- PIN: 233321
- Vehicle registration: UP-61
- Sex ratio: male female ♂/♀
- Website: Bhimapar Ghazipur
- Holy City Of Ghazipur

Aunrihar is a town in Ghazipur district of Varanasi division of the Indian state of Uttar Pradesh.

== Geography ==
It is about 42 Km. west from Ghazipur city and about 3.2 km. from Saidpur.

Aunrihar hosts one of the oldest and the most important sites in the district – a collection of mounds stretching from Saidpur to Aunrihar. The ground under Aunrihar is strewn with fragments, large carved stones & fine pieces of sculpture which are used as common building stone. Every few yards traces of masonry walls appear

== History ==
The word Aunrihar is taken from two Hindi words (Auri+har), meaning defeating Hoons.

Hoonds were Mongols who invaded India on their way to Europe.after Alexander the Great.

Its name is symbolic as a form of victory of the great Indian warrior and Gop(Gupt) king Skandgupt over Hoons. King Skandgupt was the son of legendary king Kumar Gupt who drove the invaders out of Hindustan.

The Skandgupt kingdom period spanned 452-467 BC. The evidence can still be seen in Aunrihar, in the form of ancient stone writing, and a pillar of victory at Bhitri, Gazipur.

== Transport ==
Aunrihar Junction (under Varanasi division of the North Eastern Railway Zone of Indian Railways) is a railway station on Allahabad-Mau-Gorakhpur Main Line and Aunrihar–Jaunpur line, linking Aunrihar with other major cities. Departures from ARJ/Aunrihar Junction

Aunrihar station connects Mau Junction, Bhatni Junction and Gorakhpur Junction to the northeast, Ghazipur City, Phephna Junction, Ballia to the east, Sarnath and Varanasi Junction to the southwest, and Jaunpur junction to the northwest.
