= Mau–Ghazipur–Dildarnagar main line =

Railway line in India

Mau–Ghazipur–Dildarnagar Main Line

Overview
- Status: Operational
- Owner: Indian Railways
- Locale: Uttar Pradesh
- Termini: Mau Junction; Dildarnagar Junction

Service
- Operator(s): North Eastern Railway zone East Central Railway zone

History
- Opened: 2015

Technical
- Line length: 66 km (41 mi)
- Track gauge: 5 ft 6 in (1,676 mm) broad gauge

The Mau–Ghazipur–Dildarnagar main line connects Mau Junction and Dildarnagar Junction in the Indian state of Uttar Pradesh and falls under the jurisdiction of North Eastern Railway zone & East Central Railway zone.

== Overview ==
This line is divided into three Phases and the total length of this route is 66 km (41 mi)

- First Phase is from Mau Junction(MAU) to Ghazipur City(GCT) with the length of 34 km (21 mi) and its now the development work is going on.
- Second Phase is from Ghazipur City to New Tarighat(Naagsaar)(NTRG) with the length of 14 km (9 mi) and also its on under construction. A 1,027.50 metres (3,371.1 ft) Long Rail-cum-Road Bridge on River Ganga is being made under this phase.
- Third Phase is from New Tarighat to Dildarnagar Junction(DLN) with the length of 18 km (11 mi) with a bypass line towards Buxar (BXR). Tarighat (TRG) to Dildarnagar Junction is fully operational with the bypass line to Buxar operational from 2015.

== Project ==
The estimated cost of the project is Rs 1,765.92 crore and the expected completion cost is Rs 2,109.07 crore with five percent escalation per annum. After completion it would bigger beneficial for the Howrah–New Delhi route and boom for economical development of Eastern Uttar Pradesh and also reduction of travelling through Mau.
