= YDV =

YDV may refer to:

- Bloodvein River Airport (IATA: YDV), an airport in Bloodvein River, Manitoba, Canada
- Yadvendranagar railway station (Station code: YDV), a railway station in Uttar Pradesh, India
