= Gaura Census Town =

- Census Town
- Interactive map of Gaura Census Town
- Coordinates: 25°46′42″N 82°48′46″E
- Country: India
- State: Uttar Pradesh
- District: Jaunpur district
- Time zone: UTC+5:30 (IST)

Gaura Census Town is a census town situated in Jaunpur district of Uttar Pradesh, India. It is the most populous Census Town in the Jaunpur district. The nearest railway station is Yadvendranagar station, which is located approximately 8 km away.

== Demographics ==
The total population of Gaura consists of 5,618 people, amongst them 2,839 are males and 2,779 are females.
