= Dobhi railway station =

Railway station in Uttar Pradesh

Dobhi Railway Station
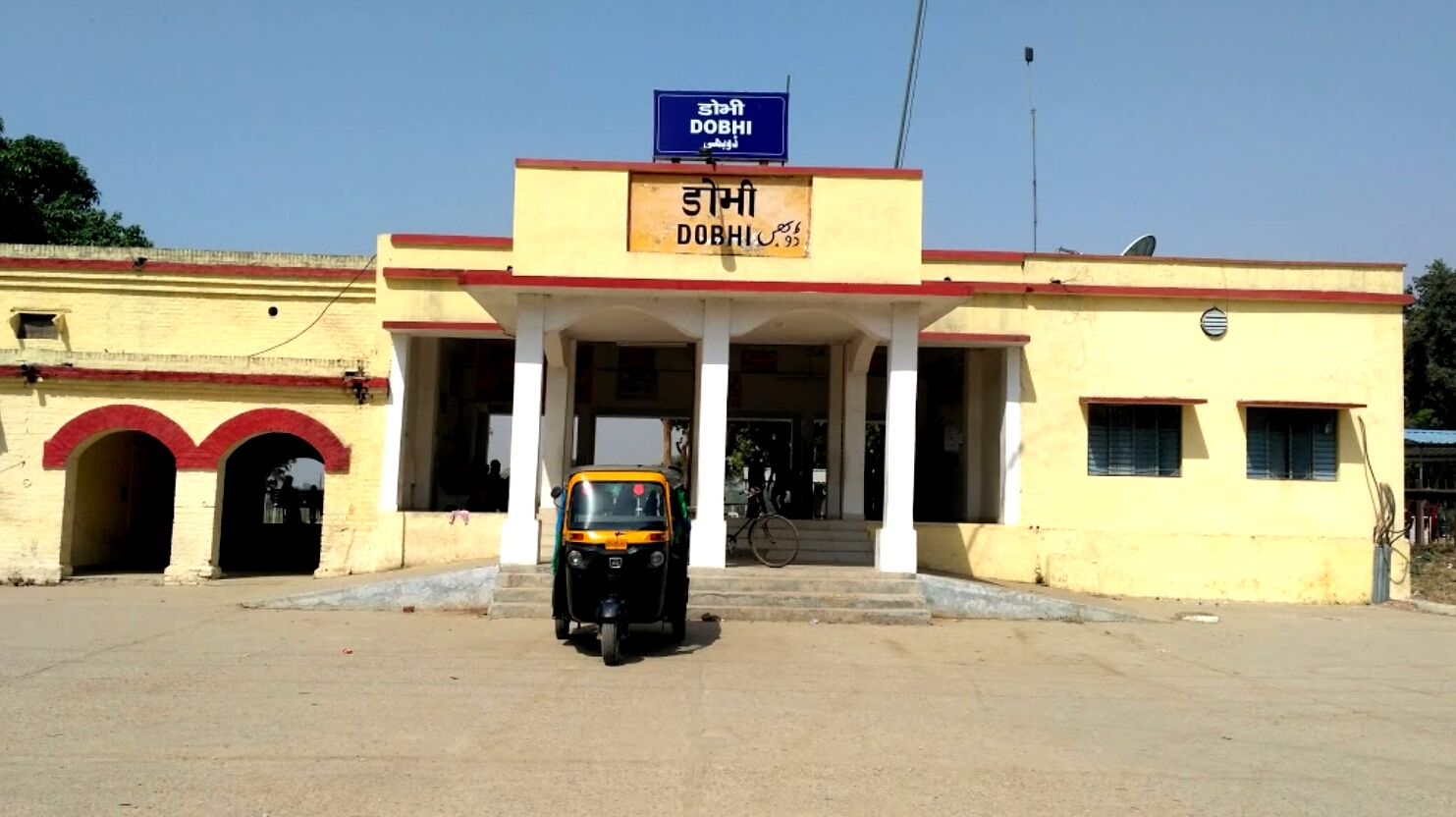
- Dobhi railway station

General information
- Location: Ramdevpur, Azamgarh – Varanasi Road, Dobhi, Jaunpur, Uttar Pradesh – 222129; India
- Coordinates: 25.611109°N 82.991009°E
- Elevation: 85 metres (279 ft)
- System: Regional rail, Light rail and Commuter rail station
- Owner: Indian Railways
- Operator: North Eastern Railway zone
- Line: Aunrihar–Kerakat–Jaunpur line
- Platforms: 3
- Tracks: 4
- Connections: Bus, Auto

Construction
- Structure type: At-grade (Indo-Gothic)
- Parking: Yes
- Cycle facilities: Yes
- Accessible: Disabled access

Other information
- Station code: DHE
- Zone(s): North Eastern Railway zone
- Division(s): Varanasi
- Fare zone: Indian Railways

History
- Opened: 21 March 1904; 122 years ago
- Rebuilt: 2010; 16 years ago
- Former names: Bengal and North Western Railway

Passengers
- 3,000

Services
Preceding station	Indian Railways	Following station
Kerakat towards Jaunpur Junction	North Eastern Railway zone Aunrihar–Kerakat-Jaunpur line	Dudhaunda towards Aunrihar Junction
Location
- Location within India Location within Uttar Pradesh

Dobhi railway station (station code DHE) is located in Dobhi, Jaunpur District, Uttar Pradesh, India.

This station is part of North Eastern Railway Zone's Varanasi Division and the Jaunpur–Kerakat–Aunrihar line.

This station is a category (NSG 6) in North Eastern Railway.

== Overview ==
Dobhi Railway station is a low-revenue station, serving over 3,000 passengers and over 10 Mail/ Express and almost 8 Passenger train on daily basis.

It is one of the railway stations in Jaunpur district, Uttar Pradesh, India. It is situated on the south-east side of the city about 38 km from Jaunpur Junction Railway Station. This station is under the Jaunpur–Kerakat–Aunrihar line.

== History ==
Dobhi Railway Station (DHE) has a history spanning over 120 years, evolving from a small branch line stop into a modernized station on a key electrified route.

Establishment and Early Era

- Opening: The station was officially opened on March 21, 1904.
- Original Operator: It was established by the Bengal and North Western Railway (BNWR) as part of the new Aunrihar–Kerakat–Jaunpur route.
- Metre Gauge Beginnings: At its inception, the line used metre-gauge (1,000 mm) tracks, typical for regional branch lines of that era intended to connect agricultural and trade hubs.
- Historical Significance: During the Quit India Movement (1942), the station was among several in the Jaunpur district that were targeted and damaged by revolutionaries protesting British rule.

== Modernization and Expansion ==
- Gauge Conversion (2010–2011): The entire Aunrihar–Kerakat–Jaunpur section was converted from metre-gauge to broad-gauge (1,676 mm). During this period, the station was rebuilt to accommodate modern trains.
- Electrification (2019): The single-line section passing through Dobhi was fully electrified in March 2019, allowing for faster electric locomotives and MEMU services.
- Doubling (2021–2022): Work to double the tracks was completed in phases, with the Aunrihar to Dobhi section finished in October 2021 and the Dobhi to Kerakat section completed in April 2022.
- Infrastructure Upgrades: The station currently features 3 platforms and 4 tracks, a significant increase from its original small-halt status.

== Trains ==
- LOKNAYAK EXPRESS
- GONDIA–BJU EXPRESS
- GCT–ANVT SUHAILDEV EXP
- ANVT–GCT SUHAILDEV EXP
- BDTS GCT EXP
- GCT BDTS EXP
- ANVT–GCT EXP
- JNU–ARJ PASSENGER
- GCT–BSB DMU
- GCT- SMVD Weekly Express

== See also ==
- North Eastern Railway Zone
- Jaunpur Junction
- Aunrihar Junction
- Kerakat railway station
- Jaunpur–Kerakat–Aunrihar line
