= BCY =

BCY or bcy may refer to:

- Brockley railway station, in London, England, by National Rail station code
- Varanasi City railway station, in Varanasi, Uttar Pradesh, India, by station code
- CityJet, an Irish regional airline headquartered in Swords, Dublin (ICAO airport code)
- Armed Forces of Ukraine
- The Bharatiya Chaitanya Yuvajana Party, a political party in the Indian state of Andhra Pradesh
- Bacama language, a language spoken in Nigeria, by ISO 639 code
- Ictaluridae, a family of fishes, by Catalogue of Life identifier
