= Phephna Junction railway station =

Junction station in Uttar Pradesh, India

Phephna Junction

General information
- Location: NH 31, Phephna, Ballia, Uttar Pradesh; India
- Coordinates: 25°46′10″N 84°03′04″E
- Elevation: 68.120 metres (223.49 ft)
- System: Indian Railways junction station
- Line: Varanasi–Chhapra line
- Platforms: 2 + 2 (under construction)
- Tracks: 2 5 ft 6 in (1,676 mm) broad gauge
- Connections: auto cum taxi stand

Construction
- Structure type: At grade
- Parking: Available

Other information
- Status: Active
- Station code: PEP
- Zone(s): North Eastern
- Division(s): Varanasi
- Fare zone: North Eastern Railway Zone
Location
- Location within India Location within Uttar Pradesh

Phephna Junction railway station is a railway station in Phephna, Ballia, Uttar Pradesh. Its code is PEP. Phephna station falls under Varanasi railway division of North Eastern Railway zone of Indian Railways

== Overview ==
Phephna Junction railway station is located at an elevation of 68 metres (223 ft). This station is located on the single-track, 5 ft 6 in (1,676 mm) broad gauge, Varanasi–Chhapra line. Doubling of railway line is sanctioned and work was in progress. Due to congestion in Ballia city, it has been decided to shift railway warehousing facility for offloading train rakes to Phephna Junction. It was reported in 2019 that development and construction was in progress and completion expected in two to three years. Phephna station is located about 10 km west of Ballia city

== Electrification ==
Phephna railway station is currently situated on single-track electrified line. There are two electrified tracks at the station. The electrification trial and inspection on Varanasi–Chhapra line was completed in December 2018.

== Amenities ==
Phephna Junction railway station has 2 booking windows and all basic amenities like drinking water, public toilets, sheltered area with adequate seating. There are two platforms at the station and one foot overbridge (FOB). Further two platforms and tracks are under development.
