= Azamgarh railway station =

Railway station in Uttar Pradesh, India

Azamgarh
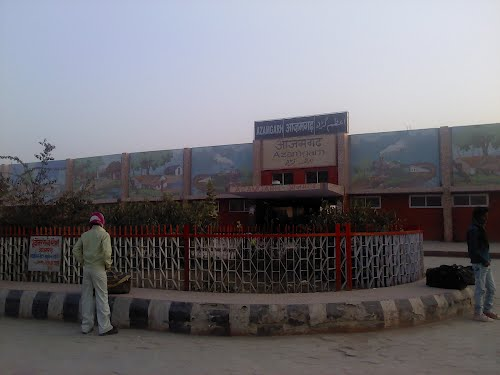

General information
- Location: SH 73, Musapur, Azamgarh, Uttar Pradesh; India
- Elevation: 81 metres (266 ft)
- System: Indian Railways station
- Owner: Indian Railways
- Operator: North Eastern Railways
- Platforms: 4
- Tracks: 7

Construction
- Structure type: At grade

Other information
- Status: Functioning
- Station code: AMH
- Zone(s): North Eastern Railway
- Division(s): Varanasi
Location
- Location within Uttar Pradesh Location within India

Azamgarh Railway Station is an electrified double line railway station located in Azamgarh, Uttar Pradesh, India. The station code is AMH.

This station is part of North Eastern Railway Zone's Varanasi Division and the Gorakhpur-Prayagraj line via Azamgarh-Jaunpur.

This station is an Aadarsh category (NSG 3) in North Eastern Railway.

Azamgarh Railway station is a high-revenue station, serving over 25,000 passengers and over 25 Mail/ Express and almost 8 Passenger trains on daily basis.

The station is well connected with many important cultural cites such as Delhi, Mumbai, Kolkata, Kanpur, Lucknow, Varanasi, Gorakhpur, Jaipur, Ahmedabad, Jaunpur, Lucknow, Surat, Amritsar, Prayagraj and Ajmer.

== History ==
Azamgarh Railway station was built by the British Government in 1896, it started as a minor railway stop. After independence in 1947, the station was developed.

In February 2024, the development of the station was announced for equipment like lifts and escalators. Under the Amrit Bharat Station Scheme works estimated over ₹27 crore were taken up in September 2025.

== Key modernization projects ==
- The construction of a 12-meter-wide foot over-bridge was started at a cost of ₹4.07 crore and was scheduled to be completed by March 2026. Earlier, a beutification project was taken up at a cost of Rs.8.14 crore and pay and use toilets were built at a cost of Rs.1.54 crore.
- Later, platform improvements including lifts were also taken up at a cost of ₹4.86 crore including accessibility for elderly and physically disabled passengers.
- A new rail line between Khurhat and Pipridih near Mau was approved.

== Services ==
- Sabarmati Express
- Kaifiyaat SF Express
- Azamgarh–Mumbai LTT Weekly Express
- Saryu-Yamuna Express
- Azamgarh–Varanasi City Passenger (unreserved)
- Azamgarh–Kolkata Weekly Express*
- Tapti Ganga Express
- Gorakhpur–Mumbai LTT Godan Express
- Aanad Vihar Trm.-Mau Express

== See also ==
- Varanasi Junction railway station
- Jaunpur Junction railway station
- Ayodhya Dham Junction railway station
- Gorakhpur Junction railway station
