= Kerakat railway station =

Railway Station in Uttar Pradesh, India

Kerakat Railway Station
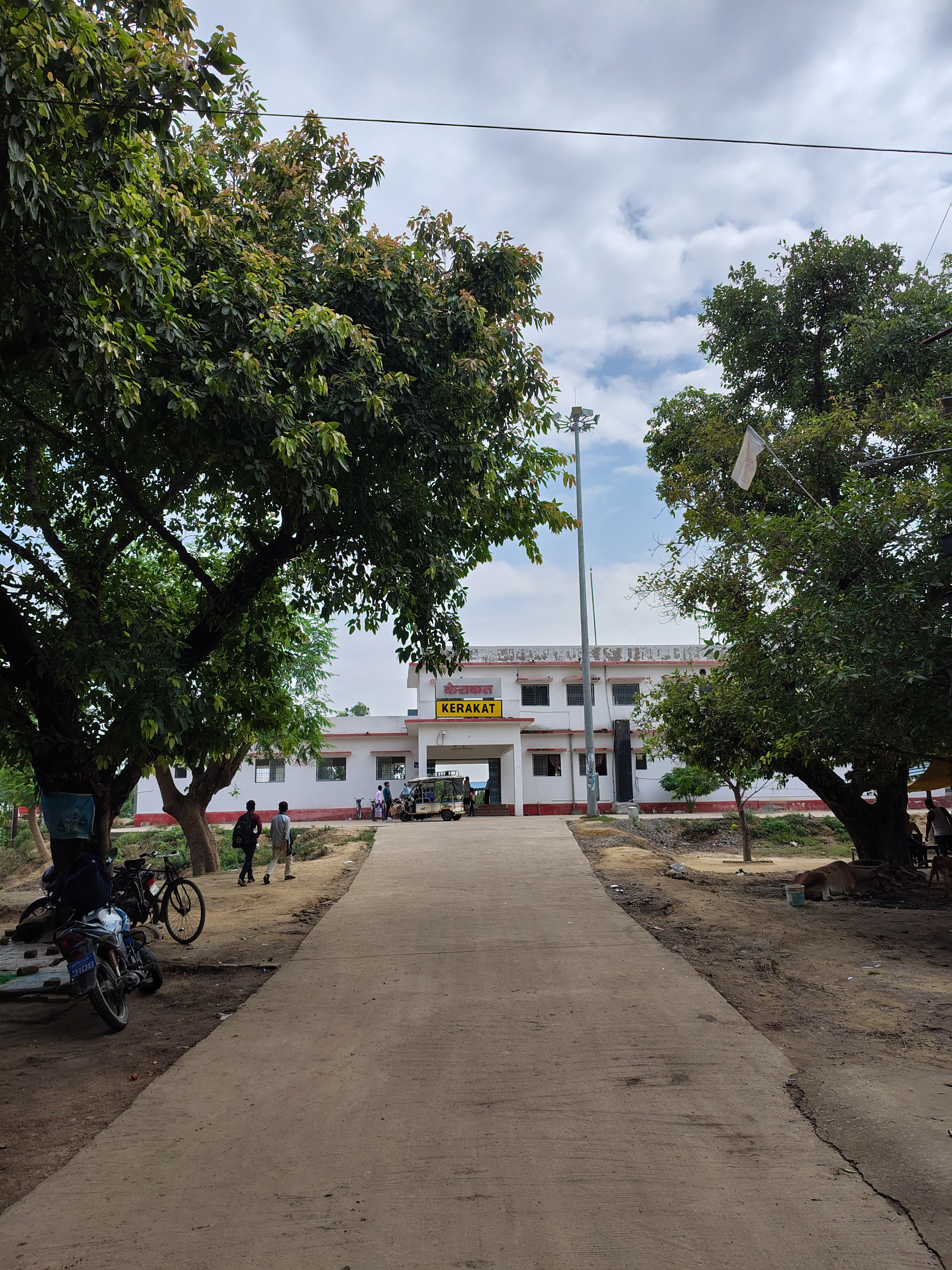
- Kerakat Railway Station

General information
- Location: Kerakat–Azamgarh Road (via Deogaon), Chittauna, Kerakat, Jaunpur, Uttar Pradesh – 222142; India
- Coordinates: 25.647767°N 82.918429°E
- Elevation: 84 metres (276 ft)
- Owner: Ministry of Railways (India)
- Operator: Indian Railways
- Line: Jaunpur-Aunrihar line
- Platforms: 2
- Tracks: 4
- Connections: Bus stand, Auto stand

Construction
- Structure type: At grade
- Parking: Yes
- Cycle facilities: Yes
- Accessible: Disabled access

Other information
- Status: Active
- Station code: KCT
- Zone(s): North Eastern Railway
- Division(s): Varanasi

History
- Opened: March 21, 1904; 122 years ago
- Rebuilt: April 23, 2022

Passengers
- 2500

Services
Preceding station	Indian Railways	Following station
Gangauli towards Jaunpur Junction	North Eastern Railway zone Aunrihar–Kerakat-Jaunpur line	Dobhi towards Aunrihar Junction
Location
- Location within India Location within Uttar Pradesh

Kerakat railway station (station code KCT) is a railway station in Jaunpur, Uttar Pradesh, India. It is a passenger rail station serving the town of Kerakat and nearby villages.

The station is situated 0.7 kilometres (0.43 mi) North side from Kerakat Main Market. The station is part of the North Eastern Railway zone's Varanasi Division and the Aunrihar-Jaunpur line via Kerakat.

This station is a category (NSG 6) in North Eastern Railway. This station is situated in east Jaunpur.

Nearby stations include Jaunpur Junction (JNU) and Zafarabad Junction (ZBD).

== Overview ==
Kerakat railway station is a low-revenue station, serving over 2,500 passengers and over 6 Mail/Express and 6 Passenger trains (including MEMU) on a daily basis. It is under the administrative control of the North Eastern Railway zone's Varanasi railway division.

Kerakat railway station is well connected with many important cultural cites such as Delhi, Mumbai, Kolkata, Jammu, Gorakhpur, Varanasi, Chhapra, Lucknow, etc.

== History ==
Kerakat railway station was established on March 21, 1904, during the British colonial era. Originally part of the Bengal and North Western Railway, it was built as a 1,000 mm (metre-gauge) line along the Aunrihar–Kerakat–Jaunpur route.

Timeline of major developments

- 1904: The Aunrihar-Kerakat-Jaunpur line was opened, with Kerakat station serving as an important stop.
- 1904 (British Steam Era): The station included a pump house on its eastern side to fill water for the steam locomotives. The ruins of this pump house are still visible today.
- 2010–2011: The Aunrihar–Kerakat–Jaunpur line was converted from metre-gauge to broad-gauge, modernizing the railway infrastructure. It was converted to 1,676 mm (5 ft 6 in)-wide broad gauge in 2010–11 along with basic amenities for the station with additional funds to the tune of ₹13 lakh (US$13,000) from MPLADS. This Station Rebuilt in 2010-2011 From Meter gauge station to Broad Gauge Station with single line.
- 2019: The single-line section was electrified.
- 2022: A new, double electric line was constructed. On April 23, 2022, a new station building was also inaugurated, marking a significant upgrade to the station's facilities

== Trains ==
1. Suhaildev Express
2. Gondia - Barauni Express
3. Loknayak Express
4. Bandra Terminus - Ghazipur City Express
5. Ghazipur City–Shri Mata Vaishno Devi Katra Weekly Express
6. Jaunpur - Ghazipur City Memu Express
7. Chhapra - Surat SPL
8. Mau - Anand Vihar Terminal SF Express

== See also ==
- Bengal and North Western Railway
- North Eastern Railway zone
- Jaunpur Junction
- Aunrihar Junction
- Varanasi Junction
