= Phephna =

Phephna Fefana
- Town
- Location of Phephna in Uttar Pradesh
- Coordinates: 25.76°N 84.04°E
- Country: India
- State: Uttar Pradesh
- District: Ballia
- Elevation: 68 m (223 ft)

Population
  - Total: 4,567

Languages
  - Official: Hindi
  - Others: Bhojpuri, Urdu
- Time zone: UTC+5:30 (IST)
- PIN: 277503
- Vehicle registration: UP-61
- Sex ratio: 985 ♂/♀

Phephna, also spelled as Fefana, is a large village in the Ballia district of Indian state of Uttar Pradesh. This village is situated at about 10 kilometers from District headquarters Ballia.

Phephna is well connected to other towns of the district and Phephna Junction provides rail connectivity.

== Demography ==
As of 2011 census, The Fefana village has a population of 4,567 of which 2,301 are males while 2,266 are females. Total population under 0-6 age group is 699 which makes up 15.31% of total population of village. Average Sex Ratio of Fefana village is 985 which is higher than Uttar Pradesh state average of 912. Average literacy rate of Fefana village was 69.60% compared to 67.68% of Uttar Pradesh. Dariapur is one village near Phephna.
