= Gorakhpur–Pune Weekly Express =

Train in India

Gorakhpur-Pune Express

Overview
- Service type: Express
- Status: Operating
- Locale: Uttar Pradesh, Madhya Pradesh and Maharashtra
- First service: Thursday 26 March 2015
- Current operator: North Eastern Railway zone

Route
- Termini: Gorakhpur Junction railway station GKP; Pune Junction railway stationPUNE
- Distance travelled: 1,753 km (1,089 mi)
- Average journey time: 34 hrs 40 mins
- Service frequency: Weekly
- Train number: 15029/15030

On-board services
- Classes: AC 2 Tier, AC 3 Tier, sleeper, SLR and GEN
- Seating arrangements: yes
- Sleeping arrangements: Available
- Auto-rack arrangements: No
- Catering facilities: No
- Observation facilities: Small & Large Both Type Windows
- Baggage facilities: Available

Technical
- Track gauge: 1,676 mm (5 ft 6 in)
- Operating speed: 51 km/h (32 mph) excluding halts

15029/15030 Gorakhpur–Pune Weekly Express is the Express train of the Indian Railways connecting Pune in Maharashtra and Gorakhpur via Basti of Uttar Pradesh.

It has inaugurated at Thursday 26 March 2015. At any given time the 15029 Gorakhpur - Pune Weekly Express always gets the normal priority like other express, on any line. The new train was announced in 2014 budget.

The 15029/15030 Gorakhpur - Pune weekly Express left Gorakhpur Junction railway station for Pune Junction railway station, to cover a distance of 1,750 km (1,090 mi) km in 34 hours 40 mins. It had a 1-1 AC 2&3-Tier and 8 3-Tier Sleeper. Also, the train is the third Express Train between Gorakhpur Junction railway station to Pune Junction railway station in India and other all trains are Express.

== History ==
This train began in March 2015.

== Accommodations ==
Gorakhpur-Pune is the express train to have One AC-2 TIER Coaches, One AC 3 TIER Coaches, Eight 3 TIER SLEEPER Coaches, Five GEN Coaches and Tow SLR Coaches. The trains have normal priority on the Indian railway network. The trains offer four classes of accommodation: Second Class AC 2-Tier (bays of 4 berths + 2 berth on the side) with open system berth, Second Class AC 3-Tier (bays of 6 berths + 2 berths on the side) it also with open system berth and Second class 3 Tier sleeper (bays of 6 berths + 2 berths on the side). Generally it has 1 AC 2-Tiers and 1 AC 3-Tiers (both of which may be increased according to demand), it has 8 Second class 3 Tier sleeper(which may be increased according to demand), it has no pantry car, 5 GEN (Unreserved) and 2 SLR (Second-class Luggage/parcel van + guard van ('G' missing). See note for 'GS' above.)

=== route ===
15029 Gorakhpur - Pune Weekly Express leaves Gorakhpur Junction on a weekly basis and reaches Pune Junction on the 3rd day.

15030 Gorakhpur - Pune Weekly Express leaves Pune Junction on a weekly basis and reaches Gorakhpur Junction on the 2nd day.

On this route, the train covers a distance of 1,750 km (1,090 mi) in 34 hrs 40 mins.

== Coach composition ==
Loco	1	2	3	4	5	6	7	8	9	10	11	12	13	14	15	16	17
	SLR	GEN	GEN	GEN	S1	28	A1	B1	S3	S4	S5	S6	S7	S8	GEN	GEN	SLR

== See also ==
- Express trains in India
- Muzaffarpur - Hadapsar (Pune) AC Express
