= Deoria Sadar railway station =

Indian railway station

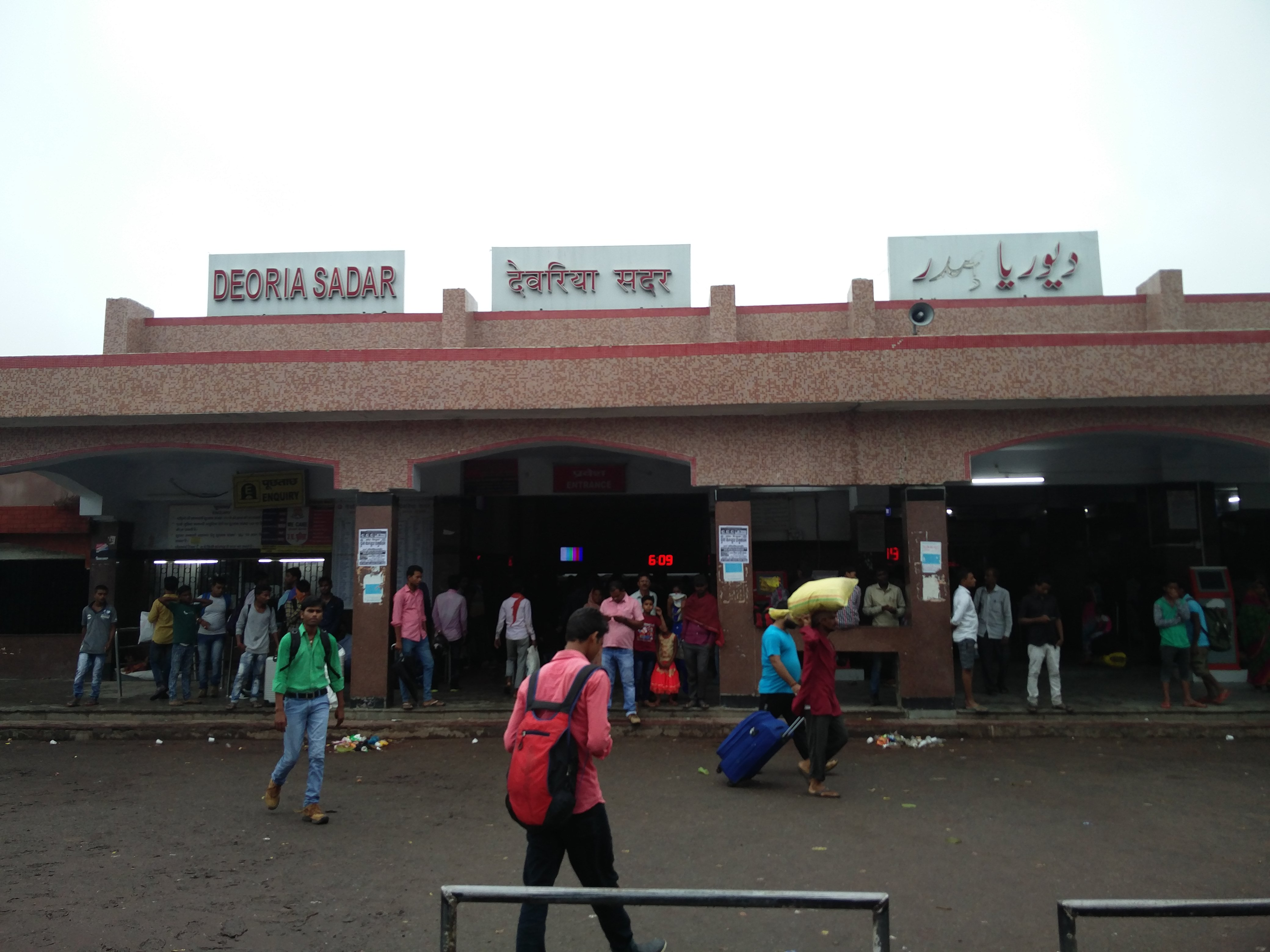
- Entrance

General information
- Location: Station Road, Deoria, Uttar Pradesh; India
- Coordinates: 26.5080°N 83.7821°E
- Elevation: 79 metres (259 ft)
- System: Indian Railways station
- Owner: Indian Railways
- Operator: North Eastern Railway
- Platforms: 3
- Tracks: 4
- Connections: Auto stand

Construction
- Structure type: At grade
- Parking: Yes
- Cycle facilities: Yes

Other information
- Status: Active
- Station code: DEOS
- Zone(s): North Eastern Railway
- Division(s): Varanasi

History
- Opened: 1920; 106 years ago
Location
- Location within India Location within Uttar Pradesh

Deoria Sadar railway station is a main railway station in Deoria district, Uttar Pradesh. It is situated on Gorakhpur–Mau–Allahabad main line and Delhi–Kanpur–Gorakhpur–Siwan–Hajipur–Baurauni–Kolkata main line, which is one of the busiest train routes in India. Its code is DEOS. It serves Deoria district and nearby district such as Kushinagar and adjoining Bihar district named Gopalganj. It served for population for nearly 4 million people. All major trains passing from this route stop here. Trains passing Deoria connect all major cities in India. Very good facility from here to travel major cities like Mumbai, Delhi, Kolkata, Chennai available on daily basis. The station consists of three platforms. The station caters to about 102 trains daily.

== Gallery ==
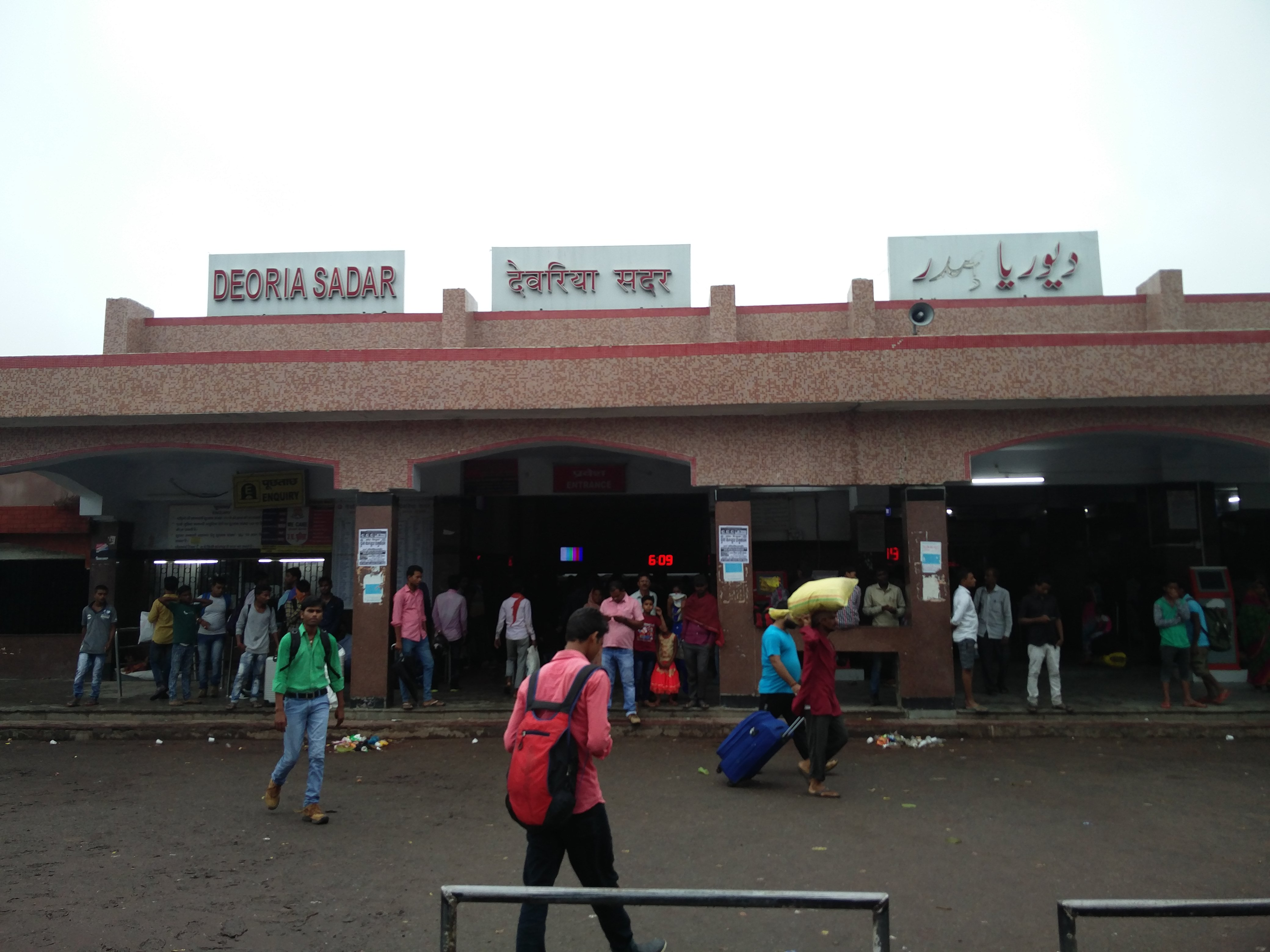
Main entrance
