= Mau Junction railway station =

Railway station in Uttar Pradesh, India

Mau Junction
- Mau Junction Railway Station

General information
- Location: Chandpura Station Road, Mau; India
- Coordinates: 25°56′30″N 83°33′39″E
- Elevation: 78 metres (256 ft)
- System: Regional rail and Light rail station
- Lines: Prayagraj–Mau–Gorakhpur main line Aunrihar–Mau–ballia line Mau–Ghazipur–Dildarnagar main line
- Platforms: 5
- Tracks: 10
- Connections: Prepaid auto cum Taxi stand

Construction
- Structure type: At grade
- Parking: Available

Other information
- Status: Operating
- Station code: MAU
- Zone(s): North Eastern Railway
- Division(s): Varanasi
- Fare zone: North Eastern Railway zone

History
- Opened: 1872; 154 years ago
- Rebuilt: 1995; 31 years ago
- Electrified: 2020; 6 years ago

Passengers
- 58000Per day

Services
free wifi
Location
- Location within Uttar Pradesh

Mau Junction is a junction station located in the city of Mau in the Indian state of Uttar Pradesh. It falls on Prayagraj–Mau–Gorakhpur main line. A developing station of the region, it is well connected to important cities like New Delhi, Mumbai, Surat, Ahmedabad, Kolkata, Pune, Lucknow, Aligarh, Kanpur, Prayagraj, Varanasi, etc.

It is NSG-2 category railway station under Northern eastern railway jurisdiction. North eastern railway

== Background ==
At starting it was a metre-gauge line. But in 1992 it converted into broad gauge. The present building towards city side was constructed in 1995 during the regime of Kalpnath Rai as a Cabinet Minister in Indian Government. The building is just like copy of Varanasi Junction.

== Development ==
In 2015 Railway Budget of India it was decided to improve it as a Terminal Station to avoid rush at Varanasi Junction. Recently Railway Board has decided to establish a new line between Mau Junction and Dildarnagar via Ghazipur. After establishment of this new line Mau will be directly connected to Howrah–Delhi main line and Howrah–Prayagraj–Mumbai line. Mau is just 93 km away from Varanasi. Mau–Shahganj railway line was started in 1901.

== Passenger amenities ==
There are 5 platforms connected by foot over bridge.

Station has Lifts and Escalators, making commuting easy along with being accessible to disabled individuals.

The Main station building has Cafeteria, Waiting Rooms along with Air Conditioned waiting rooms.

The Ticketing counter is present on the platform 1 in the main building.

== See also ==
- Prayagraj Junction
- Varanasi Junction
- Mau Express
- Kerakat railway station
