= Chhapra Junction railway station =

Railway station in Saran, Bihar, India

CHHAPRA JUNCTION

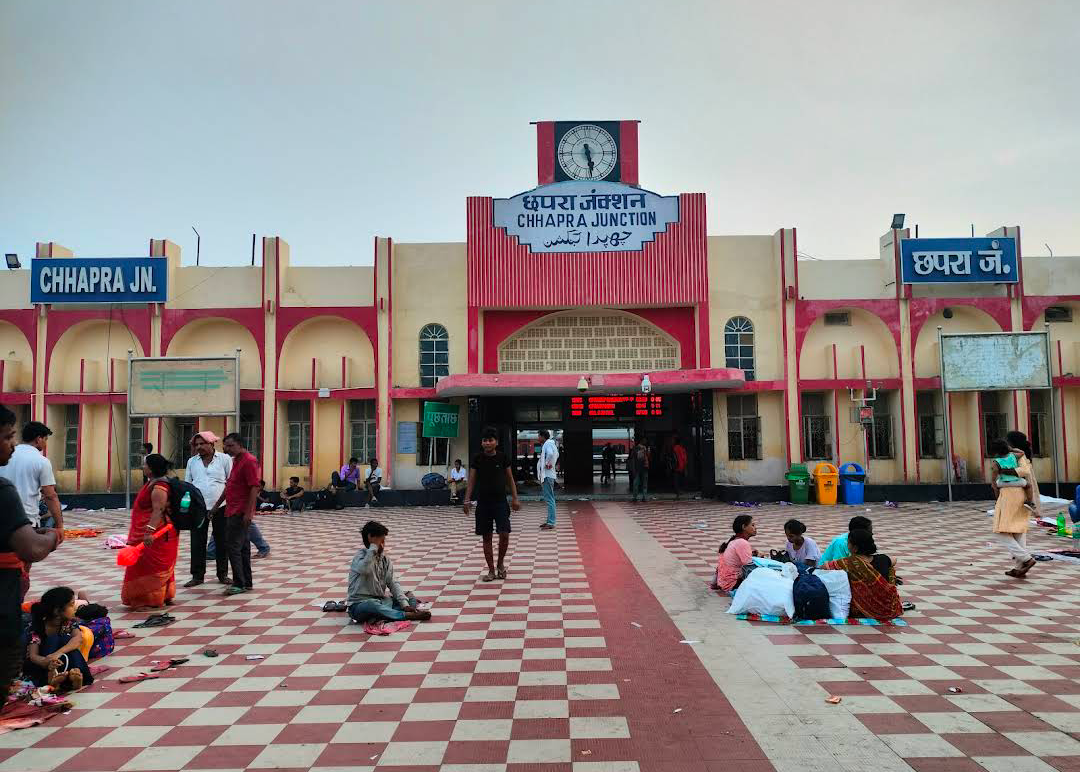
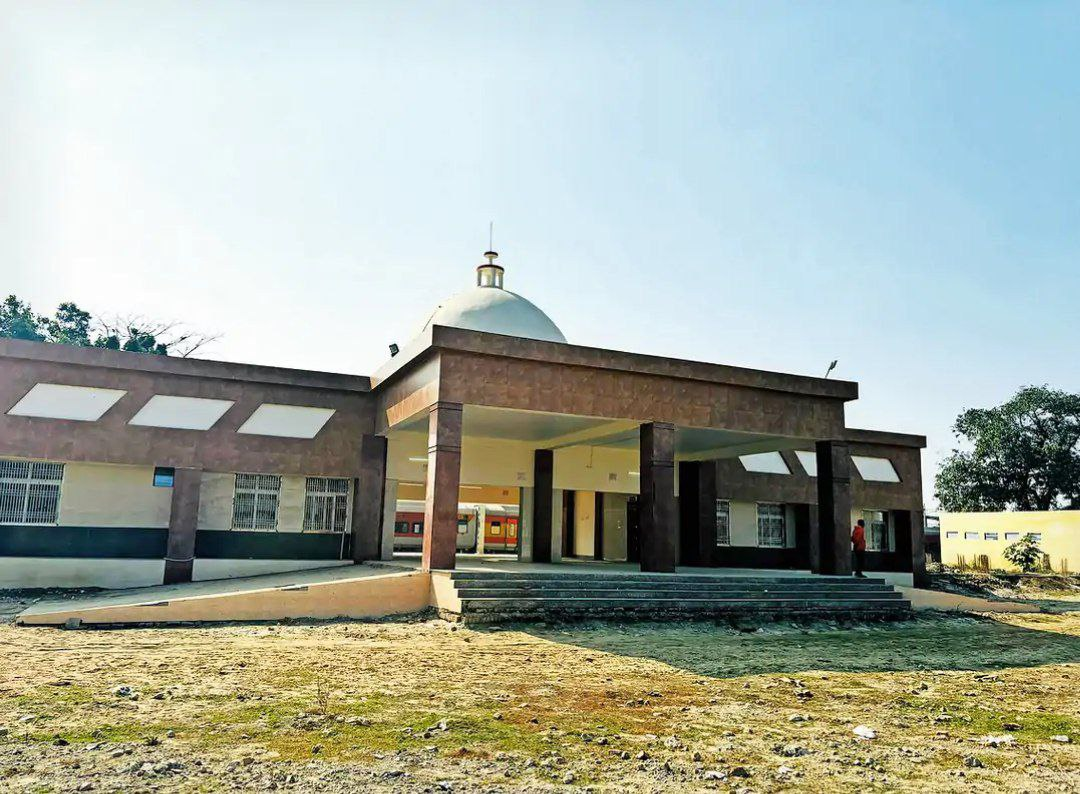

General information
- Location: Chhapra, Bihar; India
- Coordinates: 25°47′19″N 84°43′24″E
- Elevation: 58 metres (190 ft)
- System: Indian Railways station
- Owner: North Eastern Railway zone
- Operator: Indian Railways
- Lines: Varanasi–Chhapra line Barauni–Gorakhpur line Hajipur–Chhapra Section; Chhapra—Gorakhpur Section; Chhapra—Patna line Muzaffarpur—Chhapra Line Under Construction
- Platforms: 8
- Tracks: 30
- Connections: City bus, auto rickshaw, taxi

Construction
- Structure type: Standard (on ground station)
- Parking: Available
- Cycle facilities: Available
- Architectural style: Modern (after Redevelopment)

Other information
- Status: Functioning
- Station code: CPR
- Zone(s): North Eastern Railway zone
- Division(s): Varanasi

History
- Opened
- Electrified: 2012
- Former names: East Indian Railway

Passengers
- ▲13,000 Per Day
- Rank: Top 91 booking stations under
Location
- Location within India Location within Bihar
- Interactive map of Chhapra Junction

Chhapra Junction railway station (station code: CPR), is a Non-Suburban Grade-2 (NSG-2) railway station under the Varanasi railway division of the North Eastern Railway zone of Indian Railways. It is located in Chhapra city of Saran district, in the Indian state of Bihar.

Chhapra Junction serves as a significant railway hub in North Bihar, providing extensive rail connectivity across India. The station hosts both daily and weekly train services to major cities such as New Delhi, Patna, Kolkata, Varanasi, Ahmedabad, Mumbai, Amritsar, Pune, Chennai, Bengaluru, Lucknow, Kanpur, Prayagraj, Howrah.

== Administration ==
This station falls under Varanasi railway division of North Eastern Railway zone and was electrified in 2012.

== Redevelopment ==
Chhapra Junction was initially proposed to be redeveloped at an estimated cost of ₹438.42 crore under the Amrit Bharat Station Scheme. Although a tender was issued for the project, it was later cancelled without any specific reason being stated. Subsequently, Chhapra Junction was removed from the list of stations included under the Amrit Bharat Station Scheme.

On 20 June 2025, the Chairman of the Railway Board, Satish Kumar, inspected Chhapra Junction and announced a revised plan for its renovation and modernization. He stated that the Railway Board would approve funding of up to ₹40 crore for the station's redevelopment, including the construction of a new station building and the enhancement of various passenger amenities.

As part of the proposed plan, a new multi-storey building equipped with modern facilities—such as a hotel, restaurant, waiting halls, and other passenger-centric services—will be constructed on Platform No. 1. Additionally, the diesel lobby currently located on Platform No. 1 will be relocated to allow for more effective utilization of space.

== Trains ==
Chhapra Junction is one of the most important and busiest railway stations in Bihar, with 140-150 trains halting daily, in addition to 13 trains originating and 13 trains currently terminating here;

S.No	Train Name	Train Number
🟢 Daily
1	Chhapra–Lucknow Junction Express	15053 / 15054
2	Chhapra–Varanasi City Intercity Express	15111 / 15112
3	Chhapra–Farrukhabad Express	15083 / 15084
4	Sarnath Express	15159 / 15160
🟡 5–6 Days a Week
5	Chhapra–Nautanwa Intercity Express	15105 / 15106
🔵 Tri/Bi-Weekly
6	Chhapra–Mathura Superfast Express (Tri-Weekly)	15109 / 15110
7	Lokmanya Tilak Terminus–Chhapra Express (Tri-Weekly)	11059 / 11060
8	Ganga Kaveri Express (Bi-Weekly)	12669 / 12670
🟣 Weekly
9	Chhapra–Lokmanya Tilak Terminus Antyodaya Express	15267 / 15268
10	Gomti Nagar–Chhapra Express	15113 / 15114
11	Chhapra–Amritsar Weekly Express	15135 / 15136

== Revenue ==
Chhapra Junction is among the top 100 booking stations of Indian Railways. According to the Ministry of Railways (India) report, the station achieved impressive revenue figures in the financial year 2023-2024:

- Revenue earned: ₹159 crore
- Rank: 91st out of 100 stations in terms of revenue generation
- Total passenger footfall: 43,80,546

== Railway lines ==
Railway line	Route	Remarks
Chhapra – Siwan – Gorakhpur line	Chhapra → Siwan → Gorakhpur	Key north–west route connecting Bihar with Uttar Pradesh
Chhapra – Dighwara line	Chhapra → Dighwara	Short-distance/regional link — many local and long-distance trains run this section
Chhapra – Sonepur – Patliputra line	Chhapra → Sonepur → Patliputra (via Digha–Sonepur rail–road bridge)	Direct rail link to Patna; eases connectivity to Patliputra/Patna
Chhapra – Ballia – Varanasi (Varanasi–Chhapra) line	Chhapra → Ballia → Varanasi	Important east–west corridor towards eastern Uttar Pradesh and Varanasi
Chhapra – Thawe – Gopalganj line	Chhapra → Thawe → Gopalganj	Regional route serving Saran and surrounding districts
Chhapra – Muzaffarpur line (proposed)	Chhapra → (via Rewaghat) → Muzaffarpur	Proposed/planned connection to improve eastbound connectivity within North Bihar

== See also ==
- Muzaffarpur Junction
- Patna Junction
- Gorakhpur Junction
- Hajipur Junction
