= Ballia railway station =

Railway Station in Uttar Pradesh, India

Ballia Railway Station
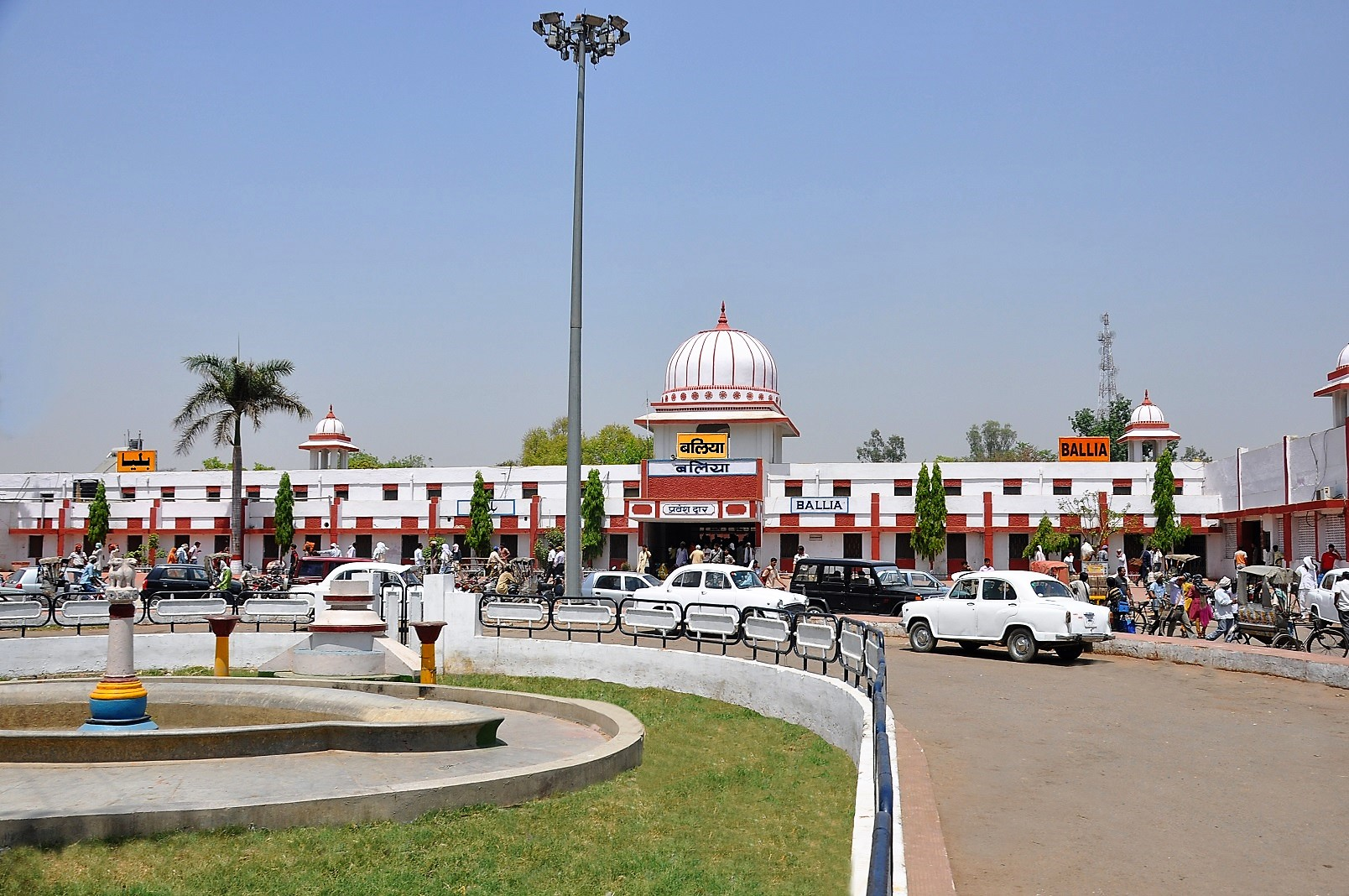
- Ballia railway station

General information
- Location: Ballia, Ballia district, Uttar Pardesh; India
- Coordinates: 25.7591°N 84.1485°E
- Elevation: 65 metres (213 ft)
- System: Indian Railways station
- Owner: Indian Railways
- Operator: North Eastern Railway (Gorakhpur)
- Lines: Varanasi–Ballia–Chhapra line, Chhapra–Jaunpur line (via Aunrihar junction), Ballia–Mau–Shahgang line, Ballia–Aara, Uttar Pradesh line.
- Platforms: 4 platforms
- Tracks: 12
- Connections: Bus Stand, Auto Stand

Construction
- Structure type: At grade
- Parking: Yes
- Accessible: Available

Other information
- Status: Functioning
- Station code: BUI
- Zone(s): North Eastern Railway
- Division(s): Varanasi

History
- Opened: 1892
- Electrified: Yes (electrified in 2018)
- Former names: Ballia

Passengers
- 70000-80000 On Daily Basis

Services
Daily
Location
- Location within India Location within Uttar Pradesh

Ballia Railway station is a railway station in Ballia, Uttar Pradesh with station code BUI. It serves Ballia city. The station consists of four platforms and new 26 coach Modern lhb washing pit. The station catering to about 92 trains including two Rajdhani Expresses. The station is well developed and include facilities like a waiting room, two bridges, a ticket counter, enquiry, three entrance gates, escalator, four platforms, food counters, a bookstall, vehicle parking, lifts, etc.

The station comes under A category railway station.

In the future, once the Mau-Gazipur-Dildarngar Line is completed, Ballia will be directly connected to Howrah-Amritsar Mainline.

A new line has been passed by railway between Ballia and Aara, allowing people to connect to Aara, Patna, and other cities of Bihar, as well as Howrah-Amritsar Mainline in the future.

Bhrigu Superfast, Ballia Sealdah, Kamayani Express & Ballia Humsafar Express are few Express Trains which runs from Ballia.

The code for the station is BUI. The station serves as the connection point to various places like Varanasi, Ahmedabad, Mumbai, Delhi, Chennai, Kolkata, Bhopal, Udhna, Lucknow, Jaipur, Patna, Kanpur, Aligarh, Amritsar, Dibrugarh, Guwahati, Ajmer, Gorakhpur, Chhapra, and Mau etc. It is on the border of Bihar and Uttar Pradesh.

== Trains running through Ballia ==
The station on a daily basis caters to 80 trains including 2 Rajdhani Express that pass by.

Few major trains that connect through Ballia for locations that are of religious or tourist speciality include: Bhrigu Superfast Express, Sealdah Ballia Express, Kamayani Express, Sarnath Express, Sabarmati Express, Sadhbhawna Express, Ganga Kaveri Express, Kishanganj–Ajmer Garib Nawaz Express, Dr. Ambedkar Nagar–Kamakhya Weekly Express, Dibrugarh Rajdhani Express, Anand Vihar Terminal Clone Special.

The connectivity of the trains joins Ballia from the rest of India be it in the west, north, south, or east. The notable attraction of the town is Dadri Mela which is the second largest cattle fair of India. The fair also attracts a lot of people from across cities to come and witness this fair.

== Services ==
Some of the important trains that originate/terminate

- 22427/22428 Bhrigu Superfast Express
- 04055/04056 Ballia Delhi Clone Special Express
- Sealdah–Ballia Express
- Kamayani Express
- Ballia–Prayagraj Rambag Passenger
- Ballia New Delhi SF express
- Ballia Dadar special
- Ballia-Patliputra Memu
