= Bengal and North Western Railway =

Indian railway company (1882–1943)

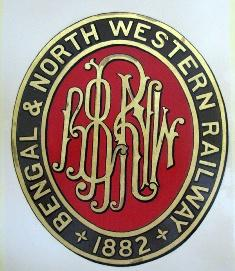
- Industry: Railways
- Predecessor: none
- Founded: 1882
- Defunct: 1 January 1943
- Successor: Oudh and Tirhut Railway
- Headquarters: India
- Area served: Northern India
- Services: Rail transport

The Bengal and North Western Railway was owned and worked by the Bengal and North Western Railway Company (registered 23 October 1882, dissolved October 1946). The Bengal and North Western Railway was merged into the Oudh and Tirhut Railway on 1 January 1943.

Its original Director was the Scottish railway engineer Alexander Izat (1844–1920) who was responsible for the engineering of the lines and stations.

== Bengal & North Western main line ==
Bengal & North Western main line was a 301-mile-long (484 km) metre gauge line consisting of the following sections:

- Sonepur to Mankapur (219 miles (352 km)) opened 15 January 1885
- Mankapur to Gonda (17 miles (27 km)) opened 2 April 1884
- Gonda to Colonelganj (18 miles (29 km)) opened (29 October 1891) 1 February 1892
- Colonelganj to Jarwal Road (11 miles (18 km)) opened 1 February 1892
- Jarwal Road to Bahramghat (5 miles (8 km)) (including Elgin Bridge) opened 18 December 1896
- Bahramghat to Burhwal (4 miles (6.4 km)) opened 24 November 1896
- Burwhal to Barabanki (broad gauge: 17 miles (27 km)) opened 1 April 1872
  - Burhwal to Barabanki (broad to mixed gauge) converted 24 November 1896
  - Burhwal to Barabanki (mixed to metre gauge) converted around 1943
- Dighwara-Goldingganj diversion (7 miles (11 km)) opened around 1960
- Barabanki to Chhapra (metre to broad gauge) converted 1981
- Chhapra Kacheri to Dighwara (metre to broad gauge: 10 miles (16 km)) converted autumn 2006

== Bengal & North Western Railway Loop line ==
- Chapra-Allahabad line (metre gauge: 200 miles)
- Chapra (Chhapra) to Revelganj (7 miles)
- Revelganj to west of Revelganj (1 mile) opened (15 April) 15 May 1891 opened (15 Mar) 1 April 1899
- West of Revelganj to Bakulaha (5 miles) (Inchcape Bridge) opened 7 February 1912
- Bakulaha to Phephna (33 miles)
- Phephna to Ghazipur (31 miles)
- Ghazipur ghat to Aunrihar (26 miles)
- Aunrihar to Benares (Varanasi) City (EI) (20 miles) Benares Cant. (BNW) to Benares City (BNW) (2 miles)
- Benares Cant (Junction) (EI) to Madhosingh (29 miles)
- Madhosingh to Jhusi (41 miles)
- Jhusi to Izat Bridge (3 miles)
- Izat Bridge to Allahabad City (1 mile) ~ old Manjhi branch (metre gauge: 3 miles) Revelganj to Manjhi (3 miles) ~ old Chandiara ghat branch (metre gauge: 2 miles)
- Bakulaha to Chandiaraghat (2 miles)
- Phephna to Indara (32 miles)
- Mirzapur branch (metre gauge: 7 miles) Madhosingh to Mirzapurghat (6 miles) Mirzapurghat to Chilh (½ mile)
- Maharajganj branch (metre gauge: 4 miles)
- Duraundha (Daronda) to Maharajganj (broad gauge: 4 miles)
- Siwan-Captainganj line (metre gauge: 79 miles)
- Siwan (Sawan) to Thawe (metre to broad gauge: 18 miles)
- Thawe to Turkauha (Tamkuki Road) (23 miles)
- Turkauha to Captainganj (Kaptanganj) (38 miles)
- Bhatni-Benares Chord (metre gauge: 79 miles)
- Bhatni to Tartipur (17 miles)
- Tartipur to Mau (26 miles)
- Mau to Aunrihar (36 miles)
- Bhatni to Aunrihar (metre to broad gauge)
- Barhaj branch (metre gauge: 13 miles) Salimpur to Barhaj Bazar (13 miles)
- Dohrighat branch (metre gauge: 54 miles)
- Indara to Dohrighat (22 miles)
- Shahganj branch (metre gauge: 62 miles)
- Mau to Azamgarh (27 miles)
- Azamgarh to Shahganj (35 miles)
- Jaunpur branch (metre gauge: 36 miles)
- Aunrihar-Jaunpur via Kerakat (opened 21 March 1904)

== Rolling stock ==
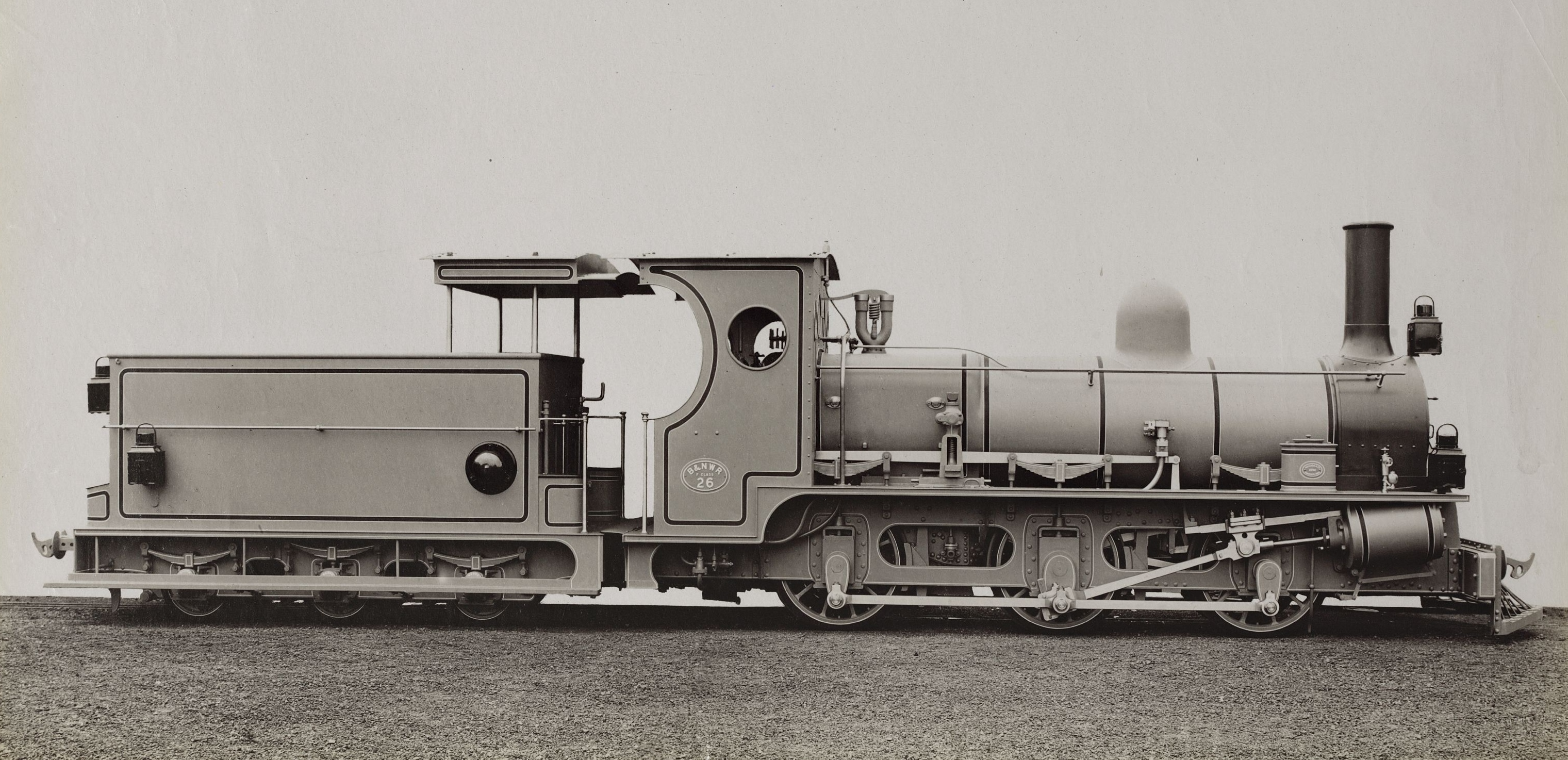
Locomotive No. 26, built by Neilson and Company

In 1936 the company owned 386 locomotives, 1293 coaches and 12.191 goods wagons.

== Classification ==
It was labeled as a Class I railway according to Indian Railway Classification System of 1926.

== Bengal and North Western Railway Battalion, Bengal Army ==
The Bengal and North Western Railway Battalion was an infantry regiment under the Volunteer Corps of the British Indian Army. The auxiliary regiment was formed on 14 June 1879 as the Bengal and North Western Railway Volunteer Rifles by the British East India Company. The headquarters of the regiment was established in Gorakhpur in the state of Uttar Pradesh. The uniform of Bengal and North Western Railway Battalion was khaki drill with white facings and the military badge included St. Andrew's cross in a thistle wreath. The battalion included staff from the Bengal and North Western Railway which was a metre gauge railway company. On 17 June 1892, the Bengal and North Western Railway Battalion was merged with the Tirhut State Railway Volunteer Rifle Corps. Later in 1917 it was designated as the 22nd Bengal and North Western Railway Battalion. Eventually the regiment was renamed as the Bengal and North Western Railway Battalion on 1 October 1920.

== See also ==
- Rail transport in India#History

== Notes ==
1. Rao, M.A. (1988). Indian Railways, New Delhi: National Book Trust
2. Chapter 1 - Evolution of Indian Railways-Historical Background
