= Varanasi railway division =

Railway division of India

Varanasi railway division is one of the three railway divisions under the jurisdiction of North Eastern Railway zone of the Indian Railways. This railway division was formed on 1 May 1969 and its headquarter is located at Varanasi in the state of Uttar Pradesh of India.

Izzatnagar railway division (at Bareilly City) and Lucknow NER railway division are the other two railway divisions under NER Zone headquartered at Gorakhpur.

== List of railway stations ==
The list includes the stations under the Varanasi railway division and their station category.

Category of station	No. of stations	Names of stations
A-1 Category	3	Chhapra Junction, Mau Junction, Varanasi Junction
A Category	5	Azamgarh, Ballia, Belthara Road, Deoria Sadar, Siwan Junction
B Category	7	Bhatni Junction, Ghazipur City, Khorasan Road, Mairwa, Banaras, Salempur and Suremanpur
C Category (Suburban station)	0	Ekma
D Category	27	Aunrihar Junction, Varanasi City, Indara Junction, Thawe Junction, Yusufpur
E Category	81	Ahimanpur, Gopalganj, Ratansarai (Barauli), Phephna Junction
F Category; Halt Station	82	Ghazipur Ghat, Kerakat Railway Station
Total	204	-

Stations closed for Passengers -
