= Jaunpur Junction railway station =

Railway station in Uttar Pradesh, India

Jaunpur Junction
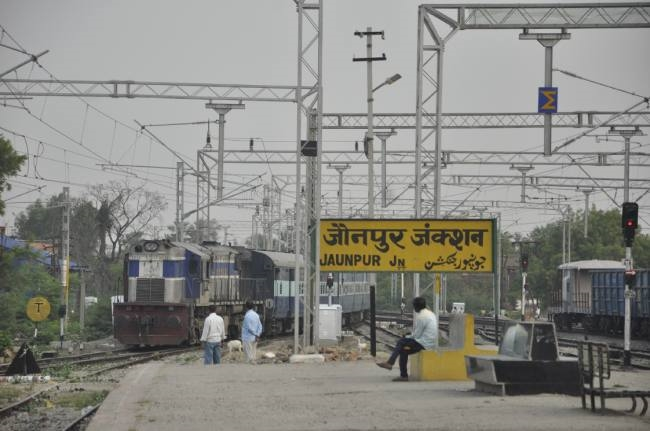
- Jaunpur Junction

General information
- Location: Station Rd, Khasanpur, Jaunpur, Etakadpur, Uttar Pradesh 222001; India
- Coordinates: 25.76°N 82.69°E
- System: Regional rail and Light rail station
- Owner: Ministry of Railways (India)
- Operator: Indian Railways
- Lines: Jaunpur-Varanasi line Jaunpur-Ayodhya-Lucknow line Jaunpur–Kerakat–Aunrihar line Jaunpur–Prayagraj line Jaunpur–Sultanpur line Jaunpur-Azamgarh-Mau-Gorakhpur line
- Platforms: 5 (functional) +1 (construction)
- Tracks: 10
- Connections: Bus stand, Taxi stand, Auto stand

Construction
- Structure type: At grade

Other information
- Status: Active
- Station code: JNU
- Zone(s): Northern Railway
- Division(s): Lucknow NR

History
- Opened: 1872; 154 years ago (Oudh & Rohilkund Railway opened line from Benaras to Lucknow); 1904; 122 years ago (Bengal And North Western Railway opened line from Aunrihar to Jaunpur Via Kerakat)

Passengers
- 20,000

Services
Location
- Location within Uttar Pradesh Location within India

Jaunpur Junction (station code JNU), also known as Bhandariya railway station, is a railway station in Jaunpur, Uttar Pradesh, India.

The station is part of the Northern Railway zone's Lucknow NR Division and the Varanasi–Lucknow line via Jaunpur-Ayodhya.

It is also part of the Prayagraj-Jaunpur line and Aunrihar–Kerakat–Jaunpur line

- Jaunpur – Shahganj – Ayodhya
- Jaunpur – Sultanpur – Lucknow
- Jaunpur – Janghai – Pratapgarh
- Jaunpur – Varanasi
- Jaunpur – Aunrihar – Ghazipur
- Jaunpur – Shahganj – Azamgarh
- Jaunpur – Janghai – Prayagraj

This station is an Adarsh category (NSG 3) in Northern Railway. This station is situated in northeast Jaunpur.

Nearby stations include Jaunpur City (JOP) and Zafarabad Junction (ZBD).

== Overview ==
Jaunpur Junction is a medium-revenue station, serving over 20,000 passengers and over 34 Mail/Express and 5 Passenger trains on a daily basis. It is under the administrative control of the Northern Railway zone's Lucknow NR railway division, and partially of the North Eastern Railway zone's Varanasi railway division.

Jaunpur Junction is well connected with many important cultural cities such as Delhi, Mumbai, Kolkata, Chennai, Jammu, Chandigarh, Dehradun, Jaipur, Ahmedabad, Bhopal, Lucknow, Patna, Guwahati, Raipur, Rameswaram, Haridwar, Tiruchirappalli, Indore, Surat, Vadodara, Vapi, Nagpur, Mathura, Vijayawada, Agra, Durg, Jamshedpur, Kharagpur, etc. The station has one overpass and one underpass facility. It also has multi facilities like unreserved class people waiting hall, SBI Bank, Public Library, Post Office, Police Station and Snack corners.

== History ==
Jaunpur Junction railway station was established in 1872 by the Oudh and Rohilkhand Railway as part of a broad-gauge line connecting Varanasi and Lucknow. This made Jaunpur a significant stop on the railway network, boosting the city's growth during the British colonial era.

Origins and development

- Colonial era: The station was developed by the British as part of their railway expansion efforts to connect major trade and administrative hubs in Uttar Pradesh.
- Branch line connection: In 1904, the Bengal and North Western Railway opened another broad-gauge line from Aunrihar to Jaunpur via Kerakat, further solidifying the city as a major rail hub.
- Post-independence: After India's independence, the station was integrated into the Indian Railways network and now falls under the Northern Railway zone's Lucknow division, with partial administration by the North Eastern Railway zone.

Key Milestones

- 1872: The broad-gauge line from Varanasi to Lucknow opened, and Jaunpur Junction was established.
- 1904: The Aunrihar-Kerakat-Jaunpur line was opened, expanding the station's connectivity.
- 1905: The Curzon Bridge was opened across the Ganges, further connecting the broad-gauge Allahabad–Faizabad line to the regional network.

Ongoing upgrades: Over the years, the station has been regularly upgraded with modern amenities, including the addition of an overpass and underpass, waiting halls, and electrification of the tracks.

== Key Modernization Projects ==
Under the Indian Railways' ongoing development initiatives, several modernization projects are underway at Jaunpur Junction (JNU), including the construction of a new station building and an additional platform. The station has also benefited from previous upgrades and is covered by the broader Amrit Bharat Station Scheme for future improvements.

Current upgrade projects

- New station building: Structural work for a new station building has been undertaken to replace or modernize the existing structure.
- Additional platform (Platform No. 6): An additional platform is being constructed as part of the ongoing Barabanki-Akbarpur doubling work to accommodate increased traffic.
- Platform shelter and toilet block: Work on new platform shelters and a toilet block is in progress.
- Infrastructure development: The station is included in the extensive rail network doubling and electrification projects in the Purvanchal region of Uttar Pradesh, with significant budget allocation in recent years.

Past modernization efforts

- 2015–2016 upgrades: Previous development work, sanctioned at a cost of approximately ₹99 lakhs, focused on improving existing passenger amenities. These works included:
- Improving the circulating area around the station.
- Upgrading platform surfaces, particularly on Platform No. 1.
- Adding water booths.
- Improving the booking office, computerized reservation systems (PRS), and waiting hall.
- Improving the approach road to the station.

== See also ==
- Varanasi Junction railway station
- Jaunpur City railway station
- Ayodhya Dham Junction railway station
- Zafarabad Junction railway station
