= Aunrihar Junction railway station =

Indian railway station

Aunrihar Junction Railway Station

General information
- Location: India
- Coordinates: 25°32′N 83°11′E
- Elevation: 80 m (260 ft)
- System: Indian Railways station
- Lines: Varanasi–Chhapra line Jaunpur-Kerakat-Aunrihar Line Varanasi-Mau-Gorakhpur Line
- Platforms: 7
- Tracks: 12
- Connections: Prepaid auto cum taxi stand

Construction
- Structure type: Standard (on-ground station)
- Parking: Available

Other information
- Status: Active
- Station code: ARJ
- Zone(s): North Eastern Railway zone
- Division(s): Varanasi
- Fare zone: North Eastern Railway Zone

History
- Electrified: Double electrified

Services
Location
- Location within India Location within Uttar Pradesh

Aunrihar Junction is a railway station located in the city of Aunrihar in the Indian state of Uttar Pradesh. It is an important railway station in Ghazipur district. It falls on Varanasi–Chhapra line and Aunrihar–Jaunpur line. It is well connected to major cities including New Delhi, Mumbai, Surat, Ahmedabad, Kolkata, Pune, Faizabad, Ayodhya, Lucknow, Kanpur, Allahabad, Jaunpur and Varanasi.

== Aunrihar DMU Shed ==
Union Minister of State for Railways Manoj Sinha handed over two schemes worth Rs 153 crore to his parliamentary constituency Ghazipur. He inaugurated the DEMU shed on Aunrihar Junction.

== Electric Loco Shed, Saiyedpur Bhitri ==
Saidpur Bhitri E-loco Shed is 6 km from Aunrihar Junction and 0.5 km from Saidpur Bhitri railway station (SYH).

Minister of State for Railways and Minister of State (Independent charge) Manoj Sinha said that after the formation of AC Electric Loco Shed, the name of the Sardar Bhitri, known for the article of Emperor Skanda Gupta, will become immortal in Indian Railways. The Minister of State for Railways spoke at the foundation stone laying ceremony of AC Loco Shed. He said that 100 locos will be maintained here in the initial phase. Later it will be made of 200 people capacity.

Serial no.	Locomotive class	Horsepower	Quantity
1.	WAG-9	6120	45
Total locomotives active as of July 2025			45
