= North Eastern Railway zone =

Zones of Indian Railways

North Eastern Railway

Overview
- Headquarters: Gorakhpur
- Dates of operation: 1952; 74 years ago–present
- Predecessor: Oudh and Tirhut Railway; Assam Railway; Cawnpore–Barabanki Railway; Cawnpore–Achnera Provincial State Railway
- Successor: North Eastern Railway zone Northeast Frontier Railway (1958)

Technical
- Track gauge: Broad gauge
- Previous gauge: Mixed
- Electrification: 99%
- Length: 3,521 km approx.

Other
- Website: North Eastern Railway

The North Eastern Railway (abbreviated NER) is one of the 18 railway zones of Indian Railways. It is headquartered at Gorakhpur.

Zonal Rail Training Institute (ZRTI) is established in district Ghazipur, Uttar Pradesh.

North Eastern Railway is one of the most important transit zones. It takes loaded wagons, especially food grains, from Northern Railway divisions like Firozpur, towards the Eastern belt and Northern Frontier region (Seven Sister States). Thus, it acts as an essential cog in the food security of the country. It is also at the central area for much inward traffic from the neighboring zones. This traffic includes the shipping of food grains, fertiliser, stone chips, cement, petroleum, and coal.

As North Eastern Railway caters to a large area spread from the western part of Uttar Pradesh towards eastern Uttar Pradesh and area comprising western Bihar, it runs many passenger trains for the economically weaker sections. Thus, in its true sense, North Eastern Railway is delivering on the balance between social as well commercial objective of the Indian Railways.

== History ==
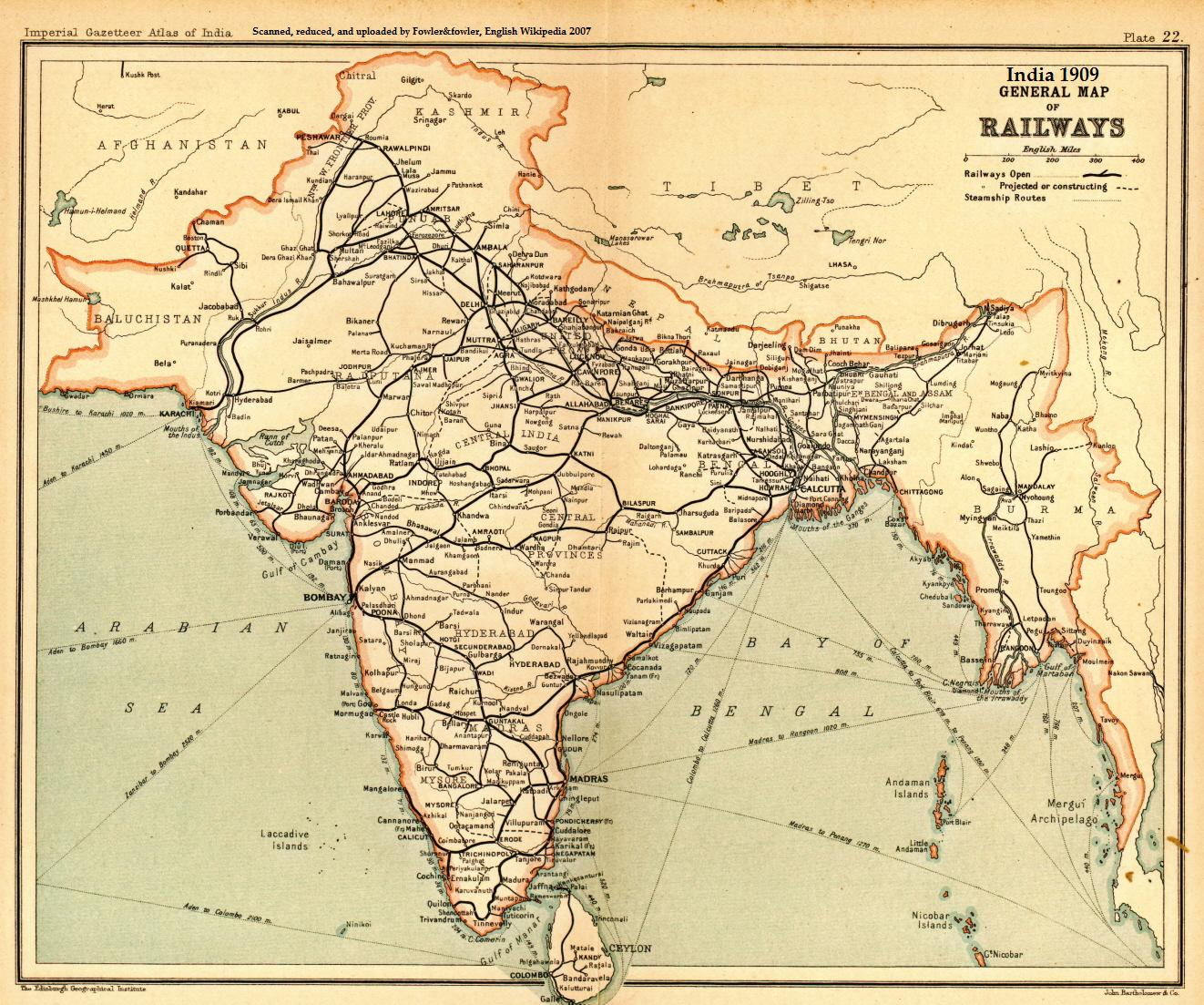
Extent of the Indian railway network in 1909

The North Eastern Railway was formed on 14 April 1952 by combining two railway systems the Oudh and Tirhut Railway and Assam Railway and the Cawnpore–Achnera Provincial State Railway of the Bombay, Baroda and Central India Railway. The Cawnpore–Barabanki Railway was transferred to the North Eastern Railway on 27 February 1953. NER was bifurcated into two Railway Zones on 15 January 1958, the North Eastern Railway and the Northeast Frontier Railway and all lines east of Katihar were transferred to Northeast Frontier Railway.

By December 2017, Indian Railways had installed 6,095 GPS-enabled "Fog Pilot Assistance System" devices across the four zones most affected by dense fog: the Northern Railway zone, North Central Railway zone, North Eastern Railway zone, and North Western Railway zone.The system replaced the earlier practice of placing detonators (firecrackers) on the tracks to warn train drivers operating at reduced speed in low visibility. This provides train pilots with advance information on the location of signals, level-crossing gates, and other approaching markers.

== Divisions ==
- Lucknow Railway division
- Varanasi railway division
- Izzatnagar railway division

== Major stations in North Eastern Railway zone ==
| Category of station | No. of stations | Stations |
|---|---|---|
| A-1 category | 6 | Gorakhpur Junction, Basti, Lucknow Junction, Chhapra Junction, Mau Junction, Izzatnagar, Lalkuan Junction |
| A category | 12 | Azamgarh, Ballia, Padrauna, Farrukhabad, Belthara Road, Deoria Sadar,Siwan Junction, Gonda Junction, Khalilabad, Kathgodam, Rudrapur City Bareilly City Kasganj Junction |
| B category | 6 | Ghazipur City (GCT), Banaras (BSBS), Varanasi City (BCY), Bhatni (BTT), Babhnan (BV), Suraimanpur |
| C category (suburban station) | - | - |
| D category | - | - |
| E category | - | - |
| F category (halt station) | - | Kerakat, Ghazipur Ghat, Paniara, Naik Dih, Hurmujpur, Fatehpur Atwa, Paligarh, Ghosi |
| Total | - | - |

== Area covered ==
NER covers UP & Bihar, and the Nepal border in three parts with three division work (Varanasi, Lucknow & Izzatnagar).

- Western Uttar Pradesh as (Mathura, Hathras City, Kasganj, Farrukhabad, Kanpur)
- Northern Uttar Pradesh & Awadh (Kathgodam, Bareilly, Pilibhit, Lakhimpur Kheri Lucknow, Barabanki, Gonda, Ayodhya)
- All Purvanchal region & North western Bihar (Gorakhpur, Jaunpur, Azamgarh, Varanasi, Allahabad, Mau, Chapra)

== Re-organisation ==
On 1 October 2002, Samastipur and Sonpur divisions were transferred to East Central Railway. The present NER, after re-organisation of railway zones in 2002, comprises three divisions - Varanasi, Lucknow and Izzatnagar. NER has 3,402.46 route km with 486 stations. NER primarily serves the areas of Uttar Pradesh, Uttarakhand and Western districts of Bihar.

== Administration ==
The administrative head of the zone is called the general manager, and is currently Saumya Mathur, as of 2024.

== Trains ==
Some trains operated by North Eastern Railway zone are as follows:

| Number | Train | Starting station | Terminating station |
|---|---|---|---|
| 12533/12534 | Pushpak Express | Lucknow Jn. NER | Mumbai CSMT |
| 22545/22546 | Lucknow–Dehradun Vande Bharat Express | Lucknow Jn. NER | Dehradun railway station |
| 22549/22550 | Gorakhpur - Prayagraj (Allahabad) Vande Bharat Express | Gorakhpur Jn. | Prayagraj Junction |
| 22539/22540 | Mau– Anand Vihar Superfast Express | Mau Jn. Railway Station | Anand Vihar Terminal Railway Station |

== Loco sheds ==
- Diesel & Electric Loco Shed, Gonda
- Diesel & Electric Loco Shed, Izzatnagar
- Electric Loco Shed, Gorakhpur
- Electric Loco Shed, Saiyedpur Bhitri

== Cultural importance ==
North Eastern Railway passes through/connects to many important tourist and cultural centres like Varanasi, Sarnath, Lucknow, Prayagraj,Bareilly, Gorakhpur, Kushinagar, Lumbani, Ghazipur City, Mau, Ballia, Suraimanpur, Deoria, Siddharth Nagar, Basti, Hathras, Mathura, Vrindavan, Azamgarh, Jaunpur, Faizabad, Nainital, Ranikhet,Farrukhabad, Pilibhit tiger reserve, Kausani, Dudhwa, Maharajganj, Nautanwa and Sonauli.

== See also ==
- All India Station Masters' Association (AISMA)
- Zones and divisions of Indian Railways
