= Lucknow–Kasganj Passenger Train =

Passenger train in India

Lucknow–Kasganj Passenger
Overview
- Service type: Passenger Train
- Current operator: North Eastern Railway zone

Route
- Termini: Lucknow Junction railway station Kasganj Junction railway station
- Stops: 53
- Distance travelled: 319 km (198 mi)
- Average journey time: 10 hours 15 minutes as 15055 from Agra Fort to Ramnagar
- Service frequency: All Days in a Week
- Train number: 55325 / 55326

On-board services
- Classes: AC 2 tier, AC 3 tier, Sleeper class
- Seating arrangements: No
- Sleeping arrangements: Yes
- Catering facilities: N/A
- Entertainment facilities: No
- Baggage facilities: No

Technical
- Rolling stock: Standard Indian Railways coaches

The Lucknow–Kasganj Passenger (55325/55326) is a passenger train belonging to Indian Railways' North Eastern Railway zone that runs between Lucknow Junction railway station and Kasganj Junction railway station in India. Currently it is running all days in a week.

== Schedule ==
The 55325 AF Lucknow–Kasganj Passenger leaves Lucknow on all days in a week at 04:30 hrs IST and reaches the Kasganj at 14:45 hrs IST. Total journey time: 10 hrs and 15 minutes.

== Route and halts ==
- Manak Nagar railway station
- Amausi railway station
- Piparsand railway station
- Harauni railway station
- Jaitipur railway station
- Kusumbhi railway station
- Ajgain railway station
- Sonik railway station
- Unnao Junction railway station
- Magarwara railway station
- Kanpur Bridge Left Bank railway station
- Kanpur Central railway station
- Kanpur Anwarganj railway station
- Rawatpur railway station
- Kalianpur railway station
- Mandhana Junction railway station
- Chaubepur railway station
- Barrajpur railway station
- Utripura railway station
- Dhaursalar railway station
- Bilhaur railway station
- Bakothikhas railway station
- Araul Makanpur railway station
- Gangawapur Halt railway station
- Mani Mau railway station
- Kannauj railway station
- Kannauj City railway station
- Jalalpur Panwara railway station
- Jasoda railway station
- Khudlapur railway station
- GursahaiGanj railway station
- Malikpur railway station
- Khudaganj railway station
- Singhirampur railway station
- KamalGanj railway station
- Yaqutganj railway station
- Fatehgarh railway station
- Farrukhabad Junction railway station
- Harsingpur Goba railway station
- Shukarullahpur railway station
- Shamsabad railway station
- Bhatasa railway station
- Kaimganj railway station
- Kampil Road railway station
- Rudain railway station
- Ballupur railway station
- Daryaogonj railway station
- Narthar railway station
- Patiali railway station
- Ganj Dundwara railway station
- Garkha railway station
- Sahawar Town railway station
- Badhari Kalan railway station
