= Kanpur Central–Kasganj Express =

Overview
- Service type: Express
- Current operator: North Eastern Railway zone

Route
- Termini: Kanpur Central (CNB); Kasganj Junction (KSJ)
- Stops: 16
- Distance travelled: 247 km (153 mi)
- Average journey time: 5h 55m
- Service frequency: Daily (Note: Runs seven days in a week for every direction.)
- Train number: 15037/15038

On-board services
- Class: General Unreserved
- Seating arrangements: No
- Catering facilities: On-board catering
- Observation facilities: ICF coach
- Entertainment facilities: No
- Baggage facilities: No
- Other facilities: Below the seats

Technical
- Rolling stock: 2
- Track gauge: Broad gauge 1,676 mm (5 ft 6 in)
- Electrification: work in progress
- Operating speed: 90kmph 42 km/h (26 mph), including halts

The Kanpur Central–Kasganj Express is an Express train belonging to North Eastern Railway zone that runs between Kanpur Central and Kasganj Junction in India. It is currently being operated with 15037/15038 train numbers on a daily basis.

== Service ==
The 15037/Kanpur–Kasganj Express has an average speed of 42 km/h and covers 247 km in 5h 55m. The 15038/Kasganj–Kanpur Express has an average speed of 42 km/h and covers 247 km in 5h 55m.

== Route and halts ==
The important halts of the train are:

- Kanpur Central
- Kanpur Anwarganj
- Rawatpur
- Kalyanpur
- Bilhaur
- Kannauj
- Farrukhabad Junction
- Shamsabad
- Sahawar Town
- Kasganj Junction

== Coach composition ==
The train has standard ICF rakes with max speed of 110 kmph. The train consists of 12 coaches:

- 10 General Unreserved
- 2 Seating cum Luggage Rake

== Traction ==
Both trains are hauled by an Izzatnagar Loco Shed-based WDM-3D diesel locomotive from Kanpur to Kasganj and vice versa.

== See also ==
- Kanpur Central railway station
- Kasganj Junction railway station
- Farrukhabad–Kasganj Express
