= Kanpur Central–Anand Vihar Terminal Express =

Train in India

Overview
- Service type: Express
- First service: 22 December 2013; 11 years ago
- Current operator: North Central Railway

Route
- Termini: Kanpur Central (CNB); Anand Vihar Terminal (ANVT)
- Stops: 12
- Distance travelled: 479 km (298 mi)
- Average journey time: 10 hrs 30 mins
- Service frequency: Weekly. (Note: Runs one day in a week for every direction.)
- Train number: 14151 / 14152

On-board services
- Classes: AC 2 Tier, AC 3 Tier, Sleeper Class, General Unreserved
- Seating arrangements: No
- Sleeping arrangements: Yes
- Catering facilities: On-board catering, E-catering
- Observation facilities: Large windows
- Baggage facilities: No
- Other facilities: Below the seats

Technical
- Rolling stock: LHB coach
- Track gauge: 1,676 mm (5 ft 6 in)
- Operating speed: 46 km/h (29 mph) average including halts.
Route map
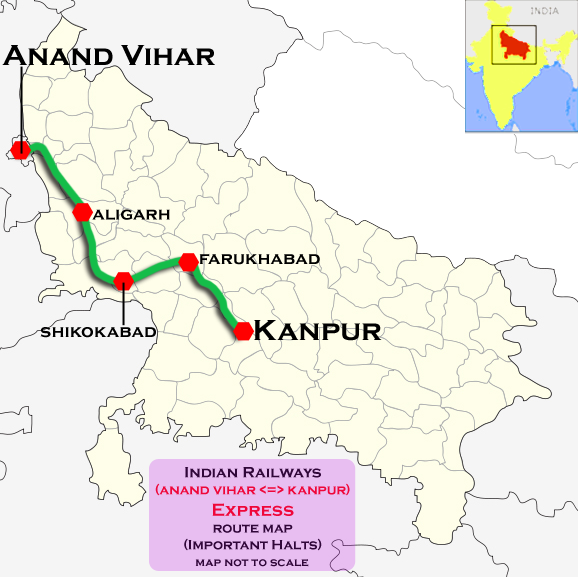

The 14151 / 14152 Kanpur Central–Anand Vihar Terminal Express is an express train belonging to North Central Railway zone that runs between Kanpur Central and Anand Vihar Terminal in India. It is currently being operated with 14151/14152 train numbers on a weekly basis.

== Service ==
The 14151/Kanpur Central–Anand Vihar Terminal Express has an average speed of 46 km/h and covers 479 km in 10h 30m. The 14152/Anand Vihar Terminal–Kanpur Central Express has an average speed of 41 km/h and covers 479 km in 11h 45m.

== Route and halts ==
The important halts of the train are:

- Kanpur Central
- Kanpur Anwarganj
- Kalyanpur
- Kannauj
- Gursahaiganj
- Fatehgarh
- Farrukhabad Junction
- Bhongaon
- Mainpuri
- Shikohabad Junction
- Tundla Junction
- Aligarh Junction
- Anand Vihar Terminal

== Coach composition ==
The train has LHB Rakes with max speed of 130 kmph. The train consists of 22 coaches:

- 1 AC II Tier
- 7 AC III Tier
- 8 Sleeper coaches
- 4 General
- 2 End on Generator Cars

== Traction ==
Both trains are hauled by a Kanpur Loco Shed-based WAP-7 electric locomotive from Kanpur to Delhi and vice versa.

== Direction reversal ==
The train reverses its direction 1 times:

- Farrukhabad Junction

== Rake sharing ==
The train shares its rake with 14151/14152 Kanpur Central–Bandra Terminus Weekly Express and 22445/22446 Kanpur Central–Amritsar Weekly Express.

== See also ==
- Kanpur Central railway station
- Anand Vihar Terminal railway station
- Kanpur Central–Bandra Terminus Weekly Express
- Kanpur Central–Amritsar Weekly Express
