= Kanpur Central–Bandra Terminus Weekly Express =

Train in India

Overview
- Service type: Superfast
- First service: 18 February 2015; 10 years ago
- Current operator: North Central Railway

Route
- Termini: Kanpur Central (CNB); Bandra Terminus (BDTS)
- Stops: 20
- Distance travelled: 1,615 km (1,004 mi)
- Average journey time: 26 hrs 45 mins
- Service frequency: Weekly. (Note: Runs one day in a week for every direction.)
- Train number: 22443 / 22444

On-board services
- Classes: AC 2 Tier, AC 3 Tier, Sleeper Class, General Unreserved
- Seating arrangements: No
- Sleeping arrangements: Yes
- Catering facilities: On-board catering, E-catering
- Observation facilities: Large windows
- Baggage facilities: No
- Other facilities: Below the seats

Technical
- Rolling stock: LHB coach
- Track gauge: 1,676 mm (5 ft 6 in)
- Operating speed: 60 km/h (37 mph) average including halts.

The 22443 / 22444 Kanpur Central–Bandra Terminus Weekly Express is an superfast express train belonging to North Central Railway zone that runs between Kanpur Central and Bandra Terminus in India. It is currently being operated with 22443/22444 train numbers on a weekly basis.

== Service ==
- 22443/Kanpur Central–Bandra Terminus Weekly Express has an average speed of 56 km/h and covers 1615 km in 28h 45m.
- 22444/Bandra Terminus–Kanpur Central Weekly Express has an average speed of 59 km/h and covers 1615 km in 27h 25m.

== Route & halts ==
The important halts of the train are:

- Kanpur Central
- Kanpur Anwarganj
- Rawatpur
- Kalianpur
- Mandhana Junction
- Kannauj
- Fatehgarh
- Farrukhabad Junction
- Kasganj
- Hathras City
- Mathura Cantt
- Mathura
- Achhnera Junction
- Bharatpur Junction
- Sawai Madhopur
- Kota Junction
- Ramganj Mandi
- Nagda
- Ratlam Junction
- Godhra Junction
- Vadodara
- Bharuch Junction
- Surat
- Vapi
- Borivali
- Bandra Terminus

== Coach composition ==
The train has standard ICF rakes with max speed of 110 kmph. The train consists of 18 coaches:

- 1 AC II Tier
- 4 AC III Tier
- 5 Sleeper coaches
- 6 General Unreserved
- 2 Seating cum Luggage Rake

== Schedule ==
Train number	Station code	Departure station	Departure time	Departure day	Arrival station	Arrival time	Arrival day
22443	CNB	Kanpur Central	18:20 PM	Wed	Bandra Terminus	23:05 PM	Thu
22444	BDTS	Bandra Terminus	05:10 AM	Fri	Kanpur Central	08:35 AM	Sat

== Traction ==
The route is fully electrified, both trains are hauled by a Kanpur Loco Shed-based WAP-7 electric locomotive from Kanpur Central to Bandra Terminus and vice versa.

== Rake sharing ==
The train shares its rake with;

- 14151/14152 Kanpur Central–Anand Vihar Terminal Express
- 22445/22446 Kanpur Central–Amritsar Weekly Express.

== See also ==
- Kanpur Central railway station
- Bandra Terminus railway station
