= Chauri Chaura Express =

Train in India

Overview
- Service type: Express
- First service: 1 March 1930; 96 years ago
- Current operator: North Eastern Railway

Route
- Termini: Kanpur Anwarganj (CPA); Gorakhpur Junction (GKP)
- Stops: 27
- Distance travelled: 552 km (343 mi)
- Average journey time: 13 hours 30 minutes
- Service frequency: Daily
- Train number: 15003 / 15004

On-board services
- Classes: AC First Class, AC 2 Tier, AC 3 Tier, Sleeper Class, General Unreserved
- Seating arrangements: Yes
- Sleeping arrangements: Yes
- Catering facilities: On-board catering, E-catering
- Observation facilities: Large windows
- Baggage facilities: No
- Other facilities: Below the seats

Technical
- Rolling stock: LHB coach
- Track gauge: 1,676 mm (5 ft 6 in)
- Operating speed: 130 km/h (81 mph) maximum, 42 km/h (26 mph) average including halts.

The 15003 / 15004 Chauri Chaura Express is an express train belonging to Indian Railways – North Eastern Railway zone that runs between Kanpur Anwarganj and Gorakhpur Junction in India.

It operates as train number 15003 from Kanpur Anwarganj to Gorakhpur Junction and as train number 15004 in the reverse direction, serving the state of Uttar Pradesh.

It is named after the town of Chauri Chaura in Uttar Pradesh which is famous for the Chauri Chaura incident of 1922.

== Coaches ==
The 15003 / 04 Kanpur Anwarganj–Gorakhpur Chauri Chaura Express has 1 AC Ist cum AC II Tier, 1 AC II tier, 4 AC III tier, 6 Sleeper class, 6 General Unreserved and 2 SLR (Seating cum Luggage Rake) coaches. It does not carry a pantry car.

As is customary with most train services in India, coach composition may be amended at the discretion of Indian Railways depending on demand.

== Service ==
The 15003 Kanpur Anwarganj–Gorakhpur Chauri Chaura Express covers the distance of 552 km (343 mi) in 14 hours 05 mins (39.20 km/h) and in 13 hours 20 mins as 15004 Gorakhpur–Kanpur Anwarganj Chauri Chaura Express (41.40 km/h).

== Routeing ==
The 15003 / 04 Kanpur Anwarganj–Gorakhpur Junction Chauri Chaura Express runs from Kanpur Anwarganj via Kanpur Central, Manauri, Allahabad Junction, Varanasi Junction, Mau Junction, Bhatni Junction, Chauri Chaura to Gorakhpur Junction.

== Traction ==
As the route is now fully electrified, a Kanpur Loco Shed-based WAP-7 electric locomotive hauls the train for its entire journey.

== Operation ==
The 15003 Kanpur Anwarganj–Gorakhpur Chauri Chaura Express runs from Kanpur Anwarganj on a daily basis reaching Gorakhpur Junction the next day.

The 15004 Gorakhpur–Kanpur Anwarganj Chauri Chaura Express runs from Gorakhpur Junction on a daily basis reaching Kanpur Anwarganj the next day.

== Incidents ==
- On 25 October 2010, a person was shot dead on board the train.
- On 19 April 2008, the train suffered a derailment without suffering any casualties.
- The train occasionally gets cancelled during the winter months.
