= Faizabad–Kanpur Anwarganj Intercity Express =

Faizabad Junction–Kanpur Anwarganj Intercity Express
Overview
- Service type: Intercity Express
- Current operator: Northern Railway zone

Route
- Termini: Faizabad Junction; Kanpur Anwarganj
- Stops: 7
- Distance travelled: 202 km (126 mi)
- Average journey time: 5 hours 10 mins
- Service frequency: Daily
- Train number: 14221 / 14222

On-board services
- Class: general unreserved
- Seating arrangements: Yes
- Sleeping arrangements: No
- Catering facilities: No

Technical
- Rolling stock: Standard Indian Railways Coaches
- Operating speed: 46.5 km/h (29 mph)

The 14221 / 22 Faizabad Junction–Kanpur Anwarganj Intercity Express is an Intercity Express train belonging to Indian Railways Northern Railway zone that runs between Faizabad Junction and Kanpur Anwarganj in India.

It operates as train number 14221 from Faizabad Junction to Kanpur Anwarganj and as train number 14222 in the reverse direction serving the states of Uttar Pradesh.

== Coaches ==
The 14221 / 22 Faizabad Junction–Kanpur Anwarganj Intercity Express has eight general unreserved & two SLR (seating with luggage rake) coaches . It does not carry a pantry car coach.

As is customary with most train services in India, coach composition may be amended at the discretion of Indian Railways depending on demand.

== Service ==
The 14221 Faizabad Junction–Kanpur Anwarganj Intercity Express covers the distance of 202 km (126 mi) in 5 hours 15 mins (39 km/h) and in 5 hours 05 mins as the 14222 Kanpur Anwarganj–Faizabad Junction Intercity Express (40 km/h).

As the average speed of the train is less than 55 km/h (34 mph), as per railway rules, its fare doesn't includes a Superfast surcharge.

== Routing ==
The 14221 / 22 Faizabad Junction–Kanpur Anwarganj Intercity Express runs from Faizabad Junction via Barabanki Junction, Lucknow Charbagh to Kanpur Anwarganj.

== Traction ==
As the route is not electrified, a Lucknow Charbagh based WDM-3A diesel locomotive pulls the train to its destination.
