= Barabanki Junction railway station =

Railway station in Uttar Pradesh, India

Barabanki Junction
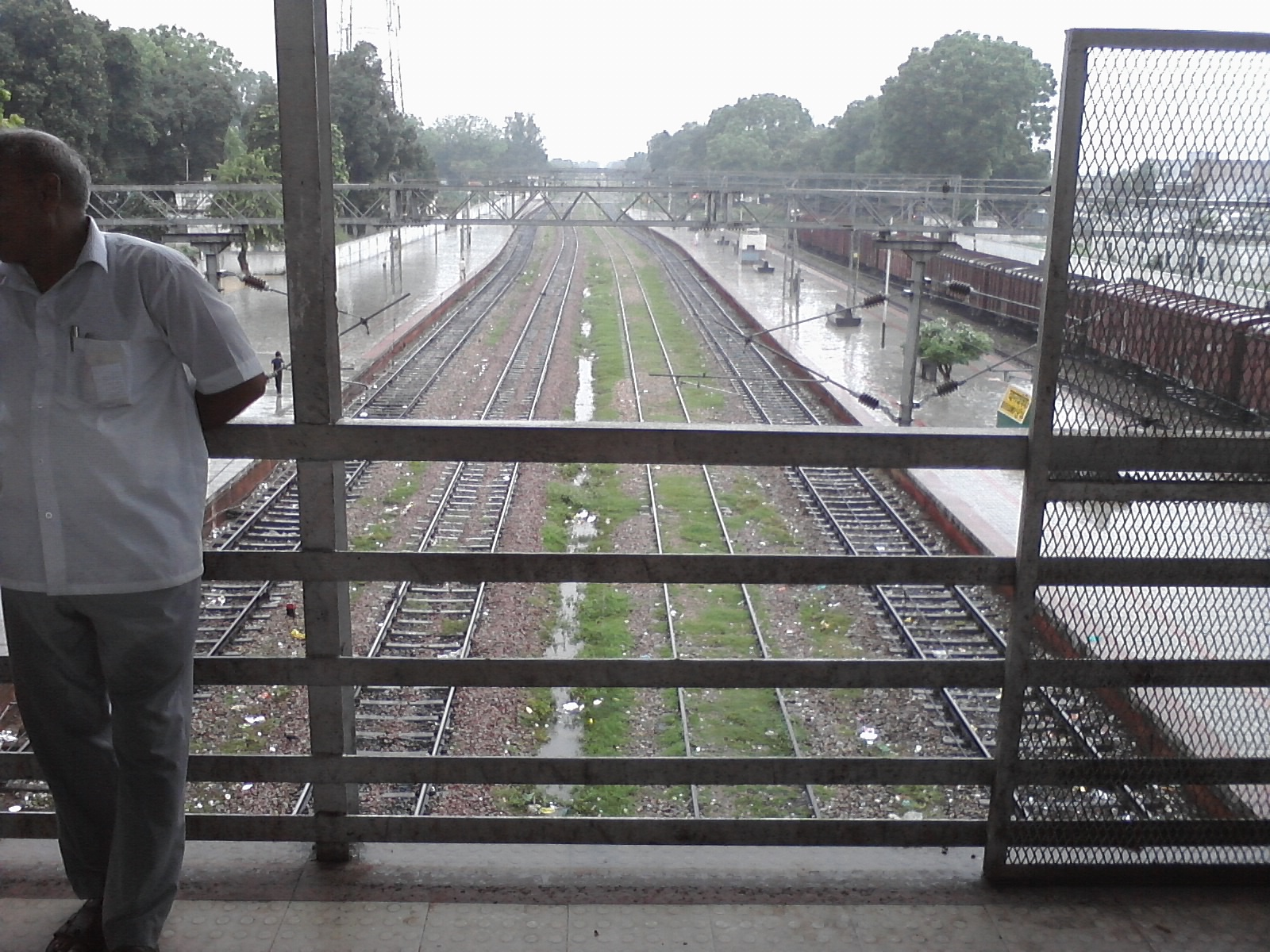
- Barabanki Junction

General information
- Location: Barabanki city & Banki town, Barabanki, Uttar Pradesh; India
- Coordinates: 26.9342°N 81.1793°E
- Elevation: 122 m (400 ft)
- System: Indian Railways junction station
- Owner: Ministry of Railways (India)
- Operator: Indian Railways, Northern Railway & North Eastern Railway
- Platforms: 4
- Tracks: 10

Construction
- Structure type: At grade
- Parking: Available

Other information
- Status: Functioning
- Station code: BBK
- Zone(s): Northern & North Eastern Railway
- Division(s): Lucknow NR

History
- Opened: 1 April 1882
- Rebuilt: 1946s
- Electrified: 2002–03
- Former names: Oudh and Rohilkhand Railway (1882–1925); East Indian Railway (1925–1952) * Cawnpore–Burhwal Railway (1896–1943); Bengal and North Western Railway (1896–1943); Oudh and Tirhut Railway (1855–1952) * Cawnpore–Barabanki Railway (1943–1953)

Passengers
- 2015: 8569
Location

Barabanki Junction or Barabanki station is the intercity rail station and a commuter rail hub in the Indian city of Barabanki. It has been important junction since the days of British control of India. In its category it is one of the important stations in NER. The Barabanki Junction railway station is on the Delhi– Basti– Gorakhpur main broad-gauge route in Uttar Pradesh. Barabanki Junction is also the hub for the Barabanki–Lucknow Suburban Railway. Barabanki railway station lies in the zone of high density stations.

== History ==
The station became operational on 1 April 1872 with the opening of Burhwal-Barabanki section. It got connected to Lucknow on 24 November 1896 with the opening of Daliganj-Barabanki section. The station underwent major renovation in 1940s.

Of the 301 miles of the Bengal and North Western Railway main line was 17 miles consisting of following section which was used to connect Barabanki from Burhwal:

- Burwhal–Barabanki line (17 miles)
  - Burhwal to Barabanki (broad gauge) opened 1 April 1872
  - Burhwal to Barabanki (broad to mixed gauge) converted 24 November 1896
  - Burhwal to Barabanki (mixed to metre gauge) converted around 1943

18 miles of the Cawnpore–Burhwal Railway which was later renamed as Cawnpore–Barabanki Railway, was used to connect Barabanki from Daliganj:

- Daliganj–Barabanki line (18 miles)
  - Daliganj to Barabanki (metre gauge) opened 24 November 1896

In 1981 Railway Budget two enhancements related to Barabanki were proposed:

- Northern Railway Budget section,
  - Barabanki–Lucknow section: additional broad-gauge line and other connected works
- North Eastern Railway,
  - Barabanki–Samastipur section: conversion of metre-gauge section via Muzaffarpur into broad gauge outside station parking stand.

=== Electrification ===
Electrification of tracks at Barabanki Jn took place in two phases spread across span of almost ten years.

==== Phase I ====
Phase I of electrification of tracks passing through Barabanki Jn took place in 2002–03 in two steps,

Step 1 – Safedabad–Barabanki

Electrification of tracks between Safedabad railway station and Barabanki Jn was completed on 29 September 2002.

Step 2 – Barabanki Yard

Electrification of tracks at Barabanki Yard was completed on 29 March 2003.

==== Phase II ====
Phase II of electrification of 30 km of tracks from Barabanki Jn to Burhwal Jn (section of Gorakhpur–Lucknow route) took place in 2010–11 and got completed in May 2011.

==== Goods yard ====
Barabanki station has two yards: one at Ayodhya route side and other at Gorakhpur route side. This yard used for load and unload purpose of commodities mainly coal, fertilizer, cement, stone, food grains etc.

== Routes from Barabanki Junction ==
- Lucknow Jn → Barabanki Jn → Gonda Jn (Cawnpore–Burhwal Railway)
- Lucknow → Barabanki Jn → Ayodhya Jn (Cawnpore–Barabanki Railway)
- Barabanki Jn → Barabanki Sugar Mill → Barabanki FCI (Nawabganj Sugar Factory Railway)

== Trains originating & terminating at Barabanki Junction ==
Total 5 EMUs/DMUs originate from Barabanki Junction railway station, same number of EMUs/DMUs terminate too at the station.

== Trains passing through Barabanki Junction ==
Daily 125 trains pass through Barabanki Junction. Normally around six thousand passengers pass through this railway station, this number can be higher on special occasions e.g. during season of Kumbh Mela 2013, on 7, 8 and 9 February 2013, 8500, 8700 and 8000 passengers travelled from Barabanki to Lucknow railway station to catch trains for Prayagraj as there is no direct train from Barabanki to Prayagraj.

== Gallery ==
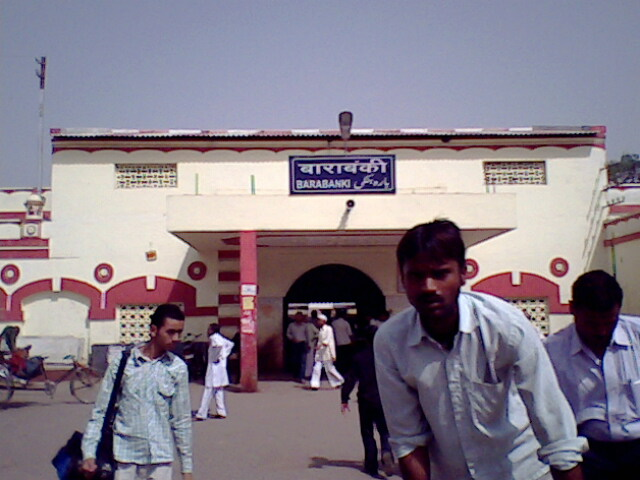
Barabanki Jn railway station outside view

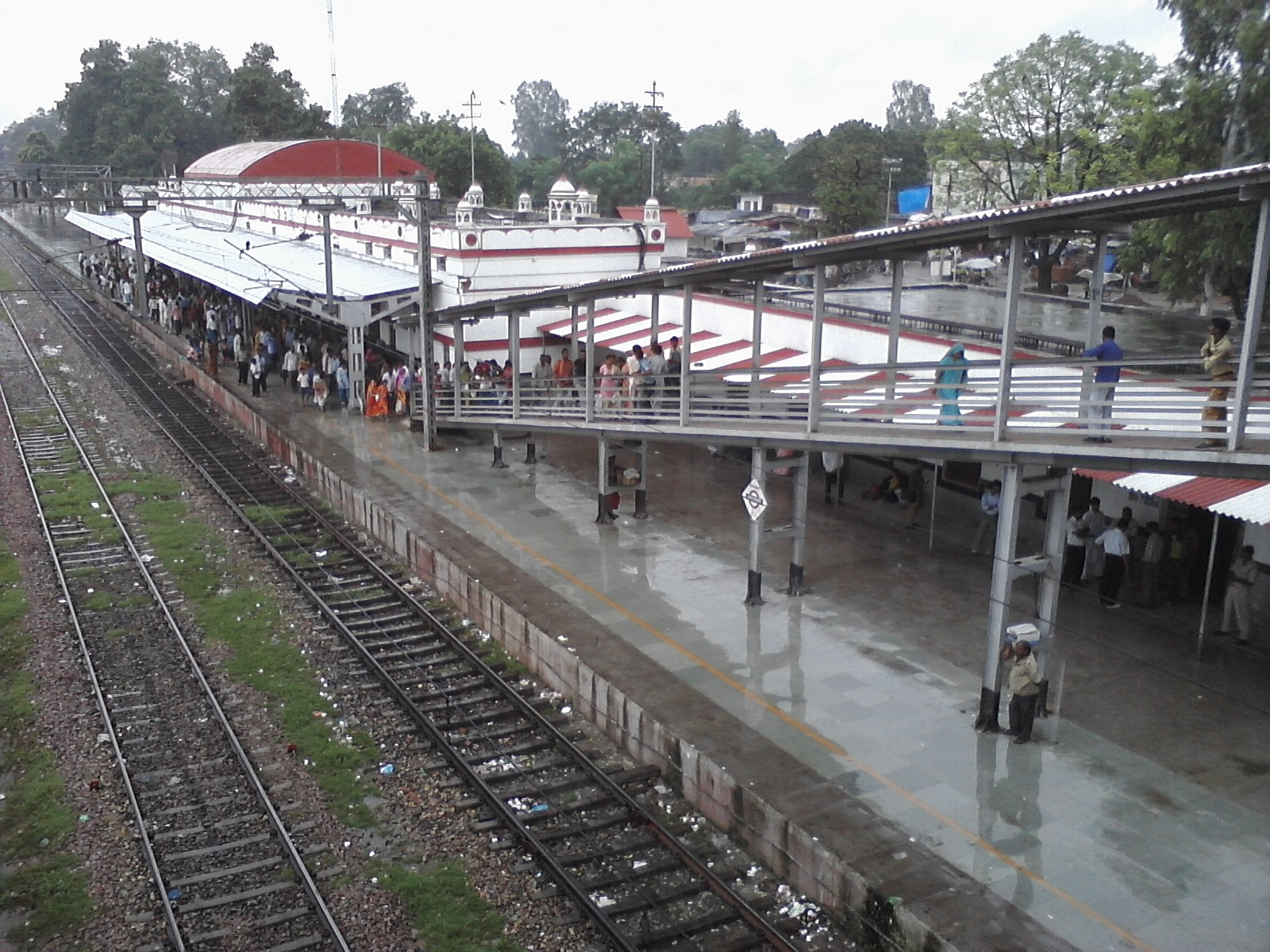
Barabanki Jn railway station inside view of Barabanki city side entrance & platform I.

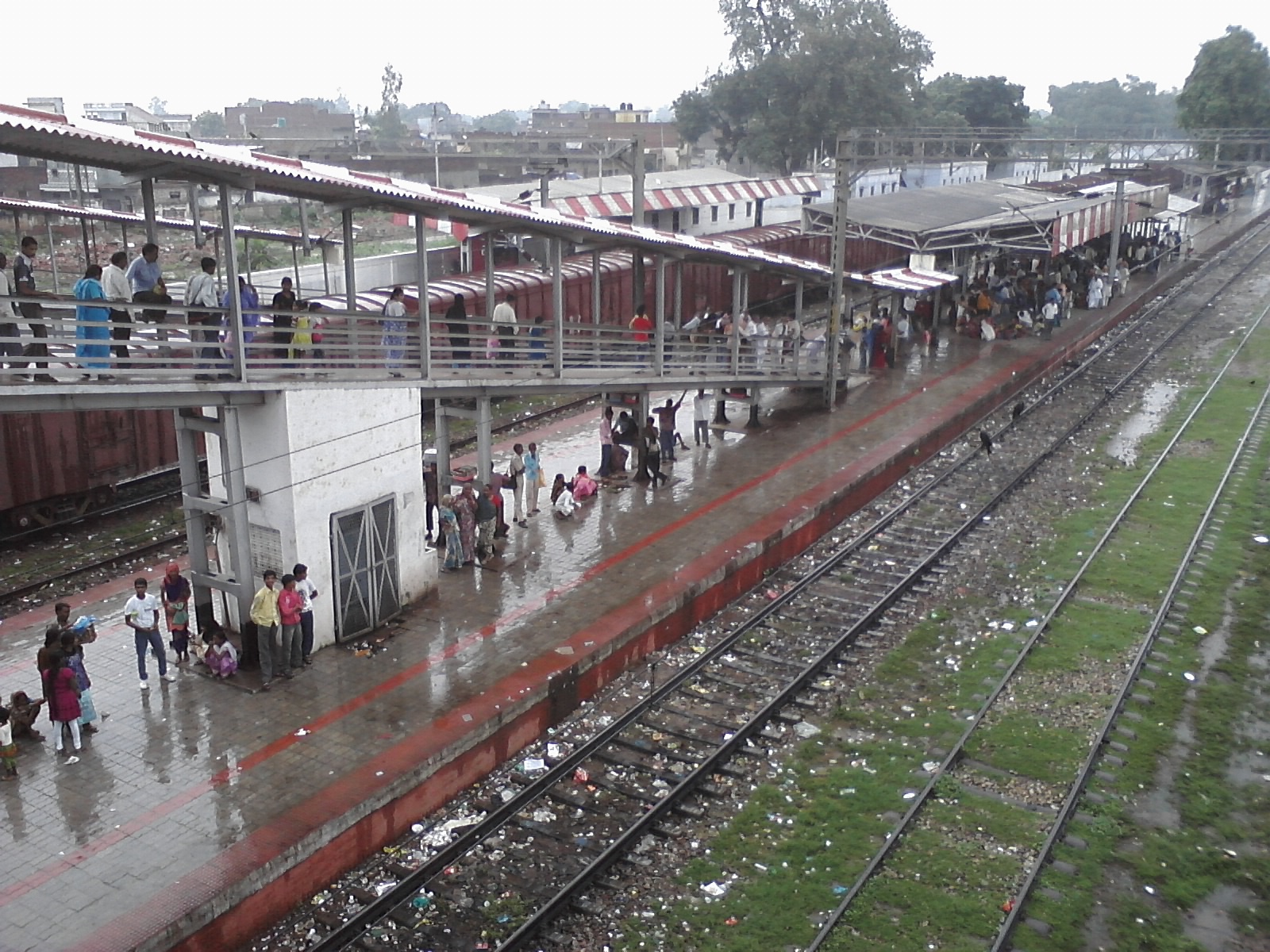
Barabanki Jn railway station inside view of platform II, III, IV & Banki town side entrance.

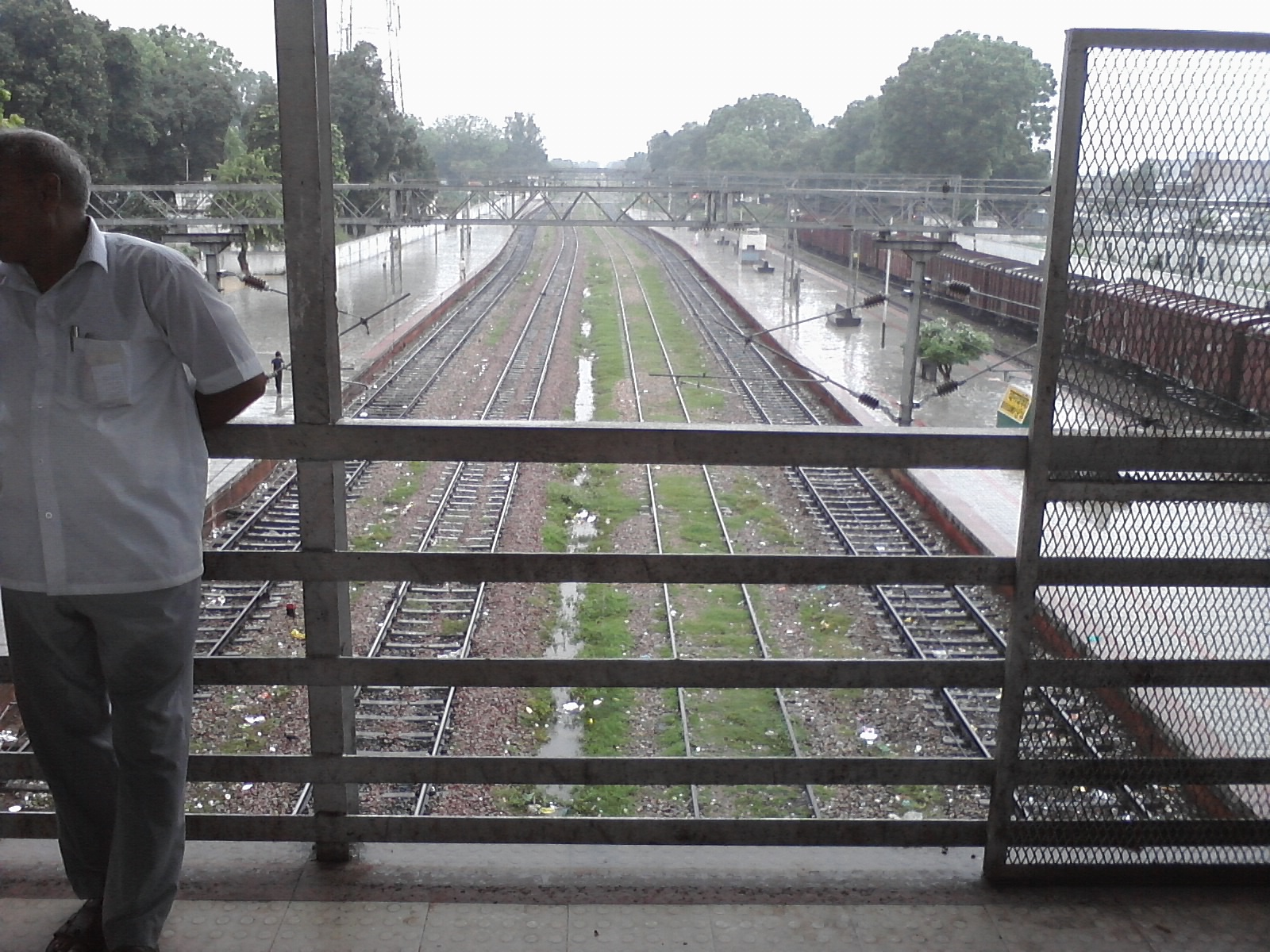
Barabanki Jn railway station inside view of Lucknow side tracks.

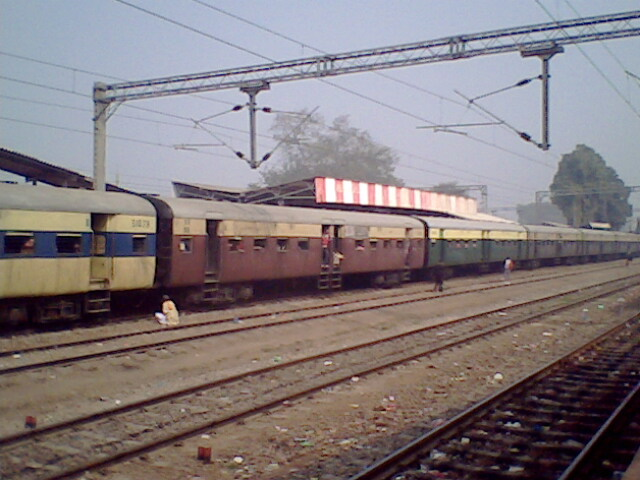
View of Barabanki–Lucknow MEMU train at Barabanki Jn railway station's platform II.

== See also ==
- Indian Railways
- Barabanki–Lucknow Suburban Railway
- Lucknow–Kanpur Suburban Railway
- Cawnpore–Burhwal Railway
- Cawnpore–Barabanki Railway
