= Majhgawan =

- town
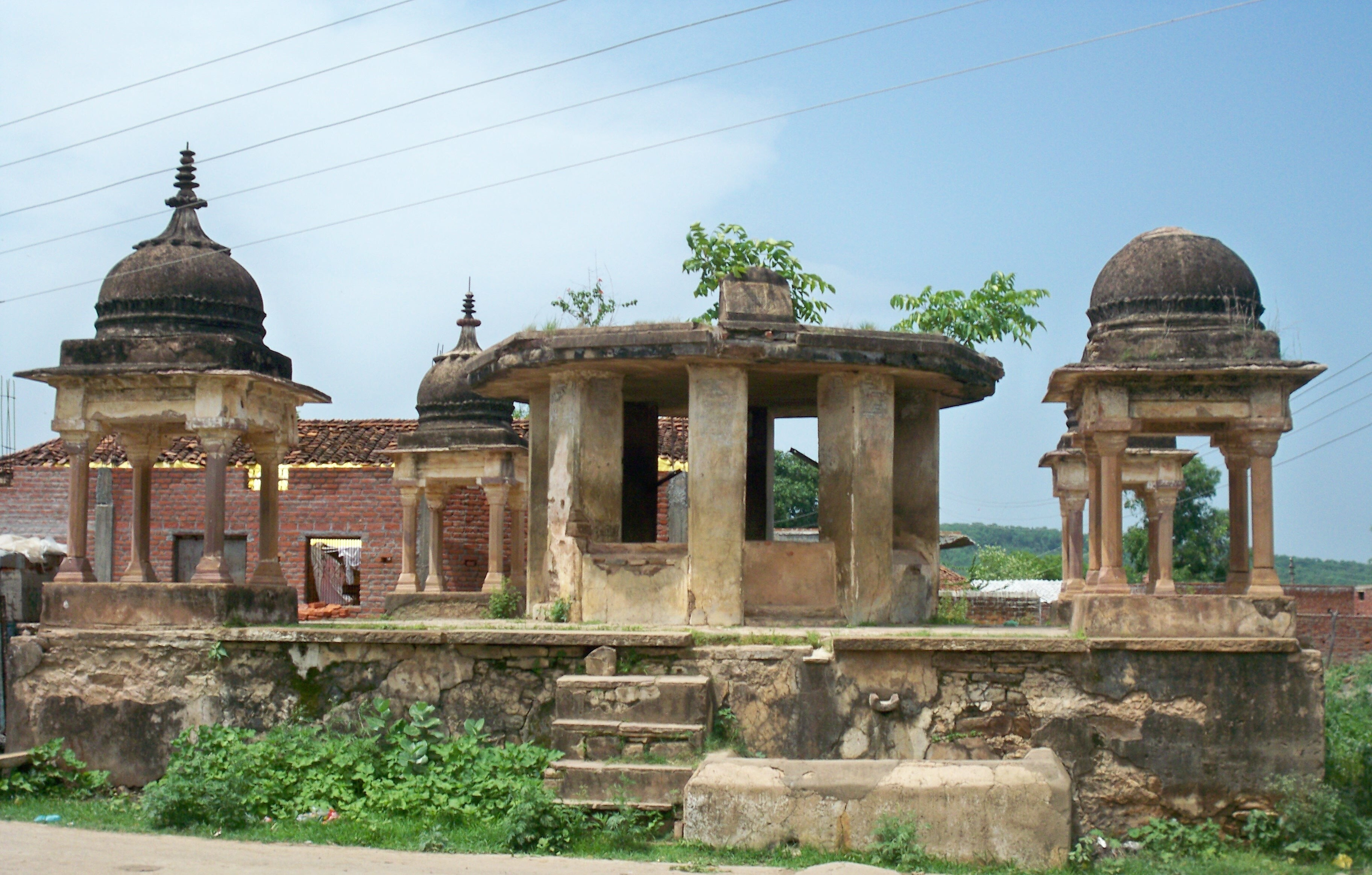
- Ancient building in front of Raja Dhiraj Temple

- Location in Madhya Pradesh, India Majhgawan (India)
- Coordinates: 24.8°N 80.8°E
- Country: India
- State: Madhya Pradesh
- District: Satna
- Elevation: 343 m (1,125 ft)

Population (2001)
  - Total: 15,000

Languages
  - Official: Hindi
- Time zone: UTC+5:30 (IST)
- PIN: 485331
- Telephone code: 917670
- Nearest city: Satna

Majhgawan is a town located in Satna District, Madhya Pradesh, about 16 km north of Kothi and 56 km from Satna, the administrative headquarters of the district. Majhgawan is mostly laid out over hills covered with dense forests and is part of the reserve forest areas of Madhya Pradesh. It's also a tehsil headquarter.

== Transport ==
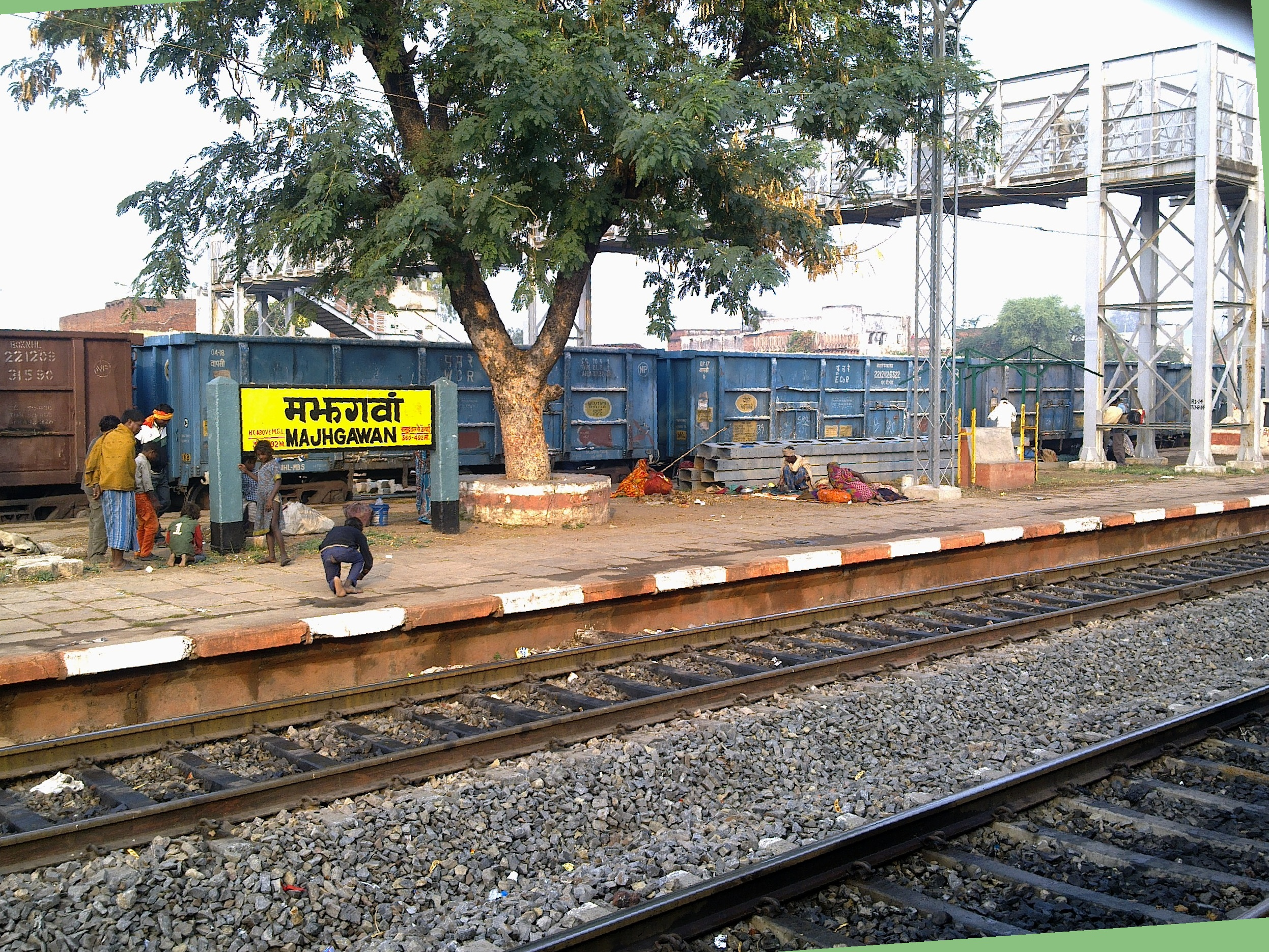
Majhgawan Railway Station

The Majhgawan Railway Station is part of the Manikpur-Katni rail route. Patna-Lokmanya Tilak Express, Jabalpur-Nizamuddin Mahakoshal Express, Chitrakoot Express and Bina - Katni Passenger, Indore - Howrah Shipra Express, Bhopal - Howrah Express, Chhapra Express, Darbhanga - Bangalore Bagmati Express are the main train connections. The closest international airport is in Khajuraho and domestic airport is located at Jabalpur. The Satna-Chitrakoot highway passes from Majhgawan, which benefits to the peoples lived here.

== Education and temples ==
The town has three higher secondary schools —ct. govt model higher secondary school, Government Higher Secondary School and Sishu Siksha Sadan affiliated by M.P. board. There are near about 15 Hindi medium primary schools and 5 English medium primary schools. The best school of Majhgawan is CT. Govt model h. s. school. The main thing is that, the education of Majhgawan is good for a student who competes with others at state or national levels. The main temple in the village is the Rajadhiraj Temple, Karuna Dham, Pamariya Baba temple, Banke Bihari temple, and Gayatri temple. There is a temple which is worshiped by many people, i.e., Hanuman temple and about three other temples.

== Demographics ==
The total population of Majhgawan (census town) according to 2011 census is 8290.

== Centres or institutions ==
- Krashi Vigyan Kendra (KVK) is centre for research of plants, trees and crops.
- Govt College Majhgawan
