= Farrukhabad–Kasganj Express =

Train in India

Overview
- Service type: Express
- Current operator: North Eastern Railway zone

Route
- Termini: Farrukhabad Junction (FBD); Kasganj Junction (KSJ)
- Stops: 6
- Distance travelled: 108 km (67 mi)
- Average journey time: 2h 30m
- Service frequency: Daily (Note: Runs seven days in a week for every direction.)
- Train number: 15039/15040

On-board services
- Class: General Unreserved
- Seating arrangements: No
- Sleeping arrangements: Yes
- Catering facilities: On-board catering E-catering
- Observation facilities: ICF coach
- Entertainment facilities: No
- Baggage facilities: No
- Other facilities: Below the seats

Technical
- Rolling stock: 2
- Track gauge: 1,676 mm (5 ft 6 in)
- Operating speed: 43 km/h (27 mph), including halts

The Farrukhabad–Kasganj Express is an Express train belonging to North Eastern Railway zone that runs between Farrukhabad Junction and Kasganj Junction in India. It is currently being operated with 15039/15040 train numbers on a daily basis.

== Service ==
The 15039/Farrukhabad–Kasganj Express has an average speed of 43 km/h and covers 108 km in 2h 30m. The 15040/Kasganj–Farrukhabad Express has an average speed of 54 km/h and covers 108 km in 2h.

== Route and halts ==
The important halts of the train are:

- Farrukhabad Junction
- Kaimganj
- Rudain
- Daryaogonj
- Patiali
- Ganj Dundwara
- Sahawar Town
- Kasganj Junction

== Coach composition ==
The train has standard ICF rakes with max speed of 110 kmph. The train consists of 12 coaches:

- 10 General Unreserved
- 2 Seating cum Luggage Rake

== Traction ==
Both trains are hauled by a Lucknow Loco Shed-based WDM-3A diesel locomotive from Farrukhabad to Kasganj and vice versa.

== See also ==
- Farrukhabad Junction railway station
- Kasganj Junction railway station
- Kanpur Central–Kasganj Express
