= Kanpur Lucknow Roadways Service =

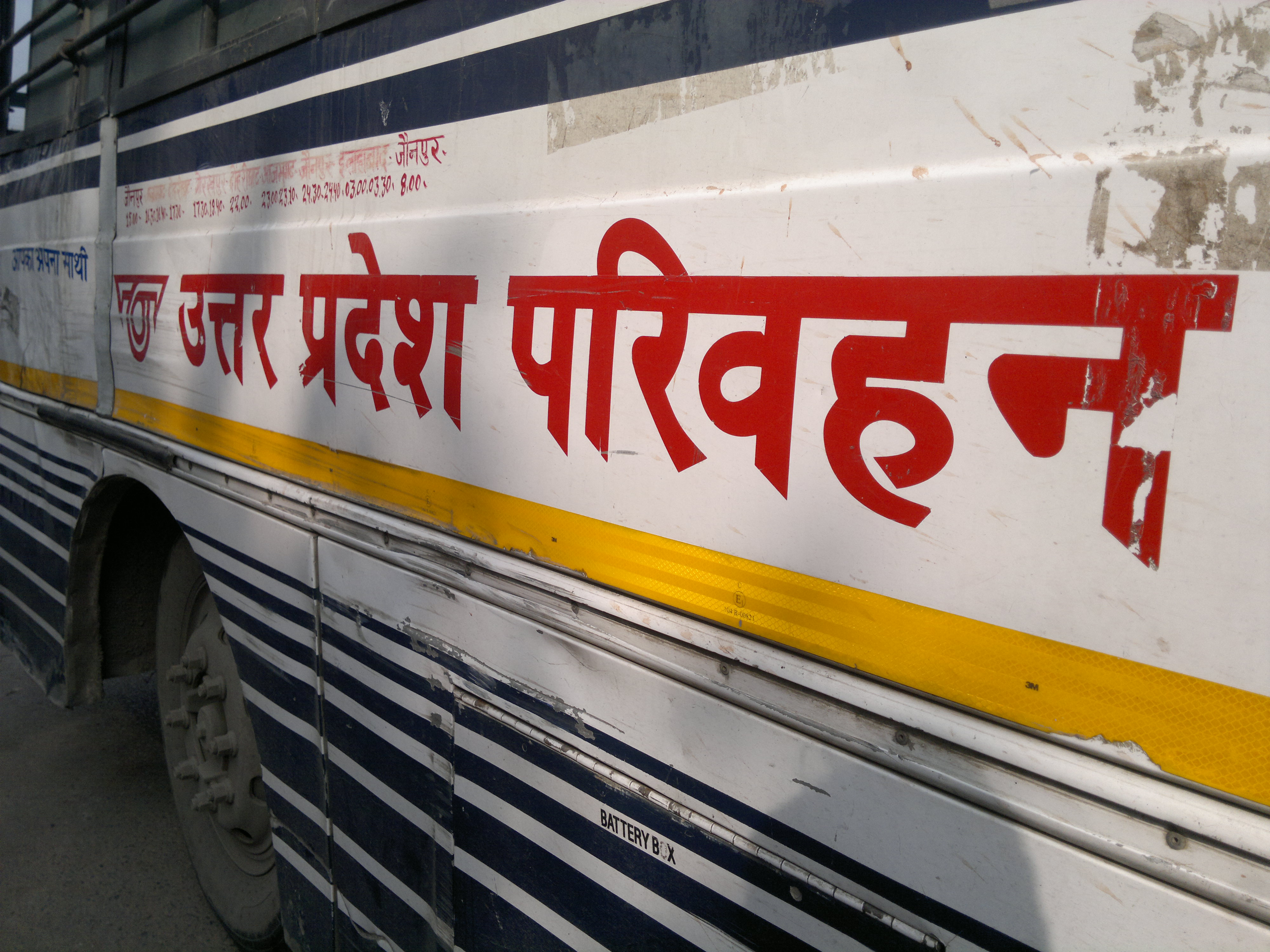
- Parent: UPSRTC
- Founded: 1951
- Service area: Lucknow, Unnao, Kanpur
- Operator: UPSRTC

The Kanpur Lucknow Roadways Service is a bus service operated by Uttar Pradesh State Road Transport Corporation in the Indian state of Uttar Pradesh, connecting its legislative capital Lucknow with the industrial capital at Kanpur.

== About ==
A wide variety of bus services are provided, including Ordinary buses, as well as air conditioned services using buses from Sheetal, Shatabdi and Volvo. The company also offers a sleeper bus service.

== Service ==
Lucknow and Kanpur are 82 kilometres (51 mi) apart by road and 72 kilometres (45 mi) by train, making it competitive for the bus service to provide service using a variety of buses and routes. Service between the two cities runs every 5 to 10 minutes at peak times. The outward and return fares for the under two hour journey differ by the route taken.

== See also ==
- Lucknow-Kanpur Suburban Railway
- Lucknow Upnagariya Parivahan Sewa
- Faizabad Bus Depot
