= Manak Nagar railway station =

Railway station in Uttar Pradesh, India

General information
- Location: Mehndi Khera, Alambagh, Lucknow, Uttar Pradesh; India
- Coordinates: 26.8106°N 80.8910°E
- Elevation: 126 metres (413 ft)
- System: Indian Railways station
- Owner: Indian Railways
- Operator: Northern Railway
- Line: Lucknow–Kanpur Suburban Railway
- Platforms: 4
- Tracks: 3 (Double Electrified BG)
- Connections: Auto stand

Construction
- Structure type: Standard (on-ground station)
- Parking: No
- Cycle facilities: No

Other information
- Status: Functioning
- Station code: MKG
- Zone(s): Northern Railway
- Division(s): Lucknow NR

Passengers
- 15,000
Location
- Location within India Location within Uttar Pradesh

Manak Nagar railway station is a small railway station in Lucknow, Uttar Pradesh. Its code is MKG. It serves Lucknow city. The station consists of three platforms. The platforms are not well sheltered.

Manak Nagar is one of the local stations in Lucknow and lies on Lucknow–Kanpur Suburban Railway.

== MEMU services ==
| From | To | Service |
|---|---|---|
| Anwar ganj | Charbagh | MEMU |
| Kalyanpur | Charbagh | MEMU |
| Panki | Lucknow Junction | MEMU |
| Kanpur Central | Barabanki | MEMU |
| Kanpur Central | Charbagh | MEMU |
| Kanpur Central | Lucknow Junction | MEMU |

== Major trains ==
Some of the important trains that runs from Manak Nagar are :

- Chitrakoot Express
- Lucknow–Jhansi Passenger
- Lucknow Junction–Kasganj Passenger
- Kasganj–Lucknow Jn. Passenger
- Kanpur–Lucknow MEMU
- Lucknow–Kanpur MEMU
- Kanpur Central–Barabanki MEMU
- Panki–Kanpur–Lucknow Jn. MEMU

| Preceding station | Indian Railways | Following station |
|---|---|---|
| Lucknow Charbagh towards ? | Northern Railway zone Lucknow–Kanpur Suburban Railway | Amausi towards ? |
