= Mathura Cantt railway station =

Railway Station in Uttar Pradesh, India

Mathura Cantt
- Indian Railways logo

General information
- Location: Mathura, Mathura district, Uttar Pradesh; India
- Coordinates: 27.4909°N 77.6849°E
- Elevation: 177 metres (581 ft)
- System: Indian Railways station
- Owner: Indian Railways
- Operator: North Eastern Railways
- Line: Mathura–Kasganj line
- Platforms: 2
- Tracks: 3 (single electric BG)
- Connections: Auto stand

Construction
- Structure type: At grade
- Parking: Yes
- Cycle facilities: Yes

Other information
- Status: Functioning
- Station code: MRT
- Zone(s): North Eastern Railway zone
- Division(s): Izzatnagar
Location
- Location within Uttar Pradesh Location within India

Mathura Cantt railway station is a small railway station in Mathura district, Uttar Pradesh. Its code is MRT. It serves the Mathura Cantt area of Mathura city. The station has two platforms, not well-sheltered. It lacks many facilities including sanitation.But overall it has some basic facilities like Water tap and Food Shops.

== Trains ==
Some of the important trains that serve Mathura Cantt are :

- Achhnera–Kasganj Fast Passenger
- Agra Fort–Ramnagar Weekly Express
- Agra Fort–Kasganj Passenger
- Bharatpur–Kasganj Passenger
- Jaipur–Lucknow Express
- Kanpur Central–Bandra Terminus Weekly Express
- Kasganj–Mathura Passenger (unreserved)
