= Event, Metaphor, Memory =

Book by Shahid Amin

Event, Metaphor, Memory: Chauri Chaura 1922-1992
- Author: Shahid Amin
- Publisher: University of California Press
- Publication date: October 26, 1995
- ISBN: 9780520087804

Event, Metaphor, Memory: Chauri Chaura 1922–1992 is a 1995 book by Shahid Amin. A Professor of History at Delhi University, Amin was a Visiting Fellow at Stanford, Princeton, and Berlin. He also authored Sugarcane and Sugar in Gorakhpur (1984).

== Content ==
Amin explores the events leading up to, during, and immediately after the burning of the Chauri Chaura thana in 1922 and murder of 22 police officers to see if the Indian popular memory of the event is accurate. The Indian popular memory is that the perpetrators were not nationalists, but criminals with no relationship to the Non-Cooperation Movement and later Nationalist Movements that Gandhi led and eventually forced the British to leave the country (Amin shows how Gandhi and even British justice forged this non-political identity onto the nationalists around Chauri Chaura). Amin aims to dissect the events around Chauri Chaura, and then analyze how the event was remembered and used as a metaphor of what not to do by the Nationalist Movement and later history. Amin's primary question is how can the event be labeled criminal and non-nationalist in the face of so much seemingly political and nationalist activity. Gandhi's trip to the region a year before (and also two weeks before) was well known, as was the organizing of nationalist volunteers, the protest against meat, fish, and liquor that led to the riot, and the repression of the police against what seemed to them a political entity. Along with this, Amin asks if there is any other evidence contained deeper in the story that can show the nationalist leanings of the peasantry (meaning dress codes, foods, and language, for example). Amin asks if the later retaliation of the police after the burning of the thana or the trials show anything about the nationalist character of the peasantry. Also, Amin seeks to understand how the memory and metaphor of Chauri Chaura was constructed and reinforced so much so that in the latter half of the twentieth century, it was identified as an event firmly placed outside the boundaries of the nationalist movement. Another subtle question is whether the unintended consequences of the Non-Cooperation Movement can really be shed from the shoulders of Gandhi and said movement. Finally, the question of memory itself is explored, and whether any exploration of such a specific event 70 years after the fact can attain a degree of historical accuracy that allows convincing conclusions, beyond the more vague, to be made.

== Argument ==
Amin's main argument is that the anti-police riot of 1922 was nationalist in nature, and that the national memory of it as criminal was constructed in the immediate aftermath of Gandhi's reaction and the course of justice pursued by authorities after the initial retaliation. Amin's extensive research into the riot (and his knowledge of the area) on a cultural, bottom-up level (as well as top-down) seeks to cement the connection between the local actors and the greater nationalist movement. Amin shows the nationalist movement to have deeply penetrated the area around the Chauri Chaura station, both with local organizing committees and propaganda, avoidance of foreign foods and clothing, but more visibly, the presence of many otiyars (volunteers, or nationalist members trained to oppose instability and mob rule) in the countryside begging for grain. Amin shows how Gandhi's visit of a year earlier was extremely influential, and although misinterpreted in many cases, how his message was directly linked to the riot.

Gandhi's immediate reaction to the riot set in motion a chain of events that firmly cast the riot in non-political terms, and hence re-defined the nature of the riot itself. Otiyars who had been nationalists the day before the riot now became misguided anti-nationalists. Gandhi's public declarations against the rioters left many of them without the authority for the acts of defiance that they believed had been encouraged. From then on, the trials would define the act as criminal, and the main approver Sikhari would relate his recognition of the event primarily in non-political terms. The judges, while recognizing the political nature of the event, pursued it on criminal ground to avoid any attempt at justification by the defense and the public at large. The police quickly became victims, and eventually a tragic casualty of the nationalist movement in popular opinion, even though they provoked the riot by their abusive behavior of local leaders. Gandhi's cessation of the Non-Cooperation Movement and his statements claiming his own guilt in relation to the riot impressed many in his commitment to non-violence, but it could be argued from Amin's testimony that by doing this, history was obfuscated. Amin shows that Gandhi's fear of mob rule and escalating violence, which he experienced in his own visit to Chauri Chaura, demanded that a clear message be affected, even an over-reaction, simplification, or complete mischaracterization.
