= Amausi railway station =

Railway station in Uttar Pradesh, India

General information
- Location: Lucknow Airport, Uttar Pradesh; India
- Coordinates: 26.7747°N 80.8418°E
- Elevation: 126 metres (413 ft)
- System: Indian Railways station
- Owner: Indian Railways
- Operator: Northern Railway
- Line: Lucknow–Kanpur Suburban Railway
- Platforms: 3
- Tracks: 6 (double electrified BG)
- Connections: Auto stand

Construction
- Structure type: Standard (on-ground station)
- Parking: No
- Cycle facilities: No

Other information
- Status: Functioning
- Station code: AMS
- Zone(s): Northern Railway
- Division(s): Lucknow NR

Services
Preceding station	Indian Railways	Following station
Manak Nagar towards ?	Northern Railway zone Lucknow–Kanpur Suburban Railway	Harauni towards ?
Location
- Location within India Location within Uttar Pradesh

Amausi railway station is a local railway station in Lucknow, Uttar Pradesh. Its code is AMS. It serves lucknow city as well as the suburbs of lucknow. The station consists of three platforms.

It is located at 7 km from the Lucknow International Airport and use full for those passengers who are coming from any other city to lucknow international airport.

Amausi is one of the local stations in Lucknow and lies on Lucknow–Kanpur Suburban Railway.

== Major trains ==
Some of the important trains that run from Amausi are:

- Chitrakoot Express
- Lucknow–Jhansi Passenger
- Lucknow Junction–Kasganj Passenger
- Kasganj–Lucknow Junction Passenger
- Kanpur–Lucknow MEMU
- Lucknow–Kanpur MEMU
- Kanpur Central–Barabanki MEMU
- Panki–Kanpur–Lucknow Junction MEMU
