= Kanpur Central–Amritsar Weekly Express =

Train in India

Overview
- Service type: Express
- First service: 11 November 2013; 11 years ago
- Current operator: North Central Railway

Route
- Termini: Kanpur Central (CNB); Amritsar (ASR)
- Stops: 13
- Distance travelled: 898 km (558 mi)
- Average journey time: 16 hrs 15 mins
- Service frequency: Weekly. (Note: Runs one day in a week for every direction.)
- Train number: 22445 / 22446

On-board services
- Classes: AC 2 Tier, AC 3 Tier, Sleeper Class, General Unreserved
- Seating arrangements: No
- Sleeping arrangements: Yes
- Catering facilities: On-board catering, E-catering
- Observation facilities: Large windows
- Baggage facilities: No
- Other facilities: Below the seats

Technical
- Rolling stock: LHB coach
- Track gauge: 1,676 mm (5 ft 6 in)
- Operating speed: 55 km/h (34 mph) average including halts.

The 22445 / 22446 Kanpur Central–Amritsar Weekly Express is an express train belonging to North Central Railway zone that runs between Kanpur Central and Amritsar Junction in India. It is currently being operated with 22445/22446 train numbers on weekly basis.

== Service ==
The 22445/Kanpur–Amritsar Weekly Express has an average speed of 55 km/h and covers 898 km in 16h 15m. The 22446/Amritsar–Kanpur Weekly Express has an average speed of 55 km/h and covers 898 km in 16h 15m.

== Route and halts ==
The important halts of the train are:

- Kanpur Central
- Unnao Junction
- Balamau Jn. (Technical Hault -For Engine Reversal)
- Bareilly Junction
- Moradabad Junction
- Laksar Junction
- Roorkee
- Saharanpur Junction
- Ambala Cantonment Junction
- Rajpura Junction
- Ludhiana Junction
- Phagwara Junction
- Jalandhar City Junction
- Beas Junction
- Amritsar Junction

== Coach composition ==
The train has standard ICF rakes (LHB rake since December 2018) with a maximum speed of 110 km/h. The train consists of 16 coaches:

- 1 AC II Tier
- 3 AC III Tier
- 5 Sleeper coaches
- 5 General
- 2 Seating cum Luggage Rake

== Traction ==
Both trains are hauled by a Lucknow Loco Shed-based WDM-3A diesel locomotive from Kanpur to Amritsar and vice versa.

== Direction reversal ==
The train reverses its direction 1 times:

- Balamau Junction

== Rake sharing ==
The train shares its rake with 14151/14152 Kanpur Central–Bandra Terminus Weekly Express and 14151/14152 Kanpur Central–Anand Vihar Terminal Express.

== See also ==
- Kanpur Central railway station
- Amritsar Junction railway station
- Kanpur Central–Bandra Terminus Weekly Express
- Kanpur Central–Anand Vihar Terminal Express
