= KJN =

KJN or kjn may refer to:

- KJN, the Indian Railways station code for Kannauj railway station, Uttar Pradesh, India
- kjn, the ISO 639-3 code for Oykangand language, Australia
