= Chitrakootdham (Karwi)–Kanpur Intercity Express (via Allahabad) =

Indian Railways Super fast train

Kanpur Chitrakootdham (Karwi) Intercity Express
Overview
- Service type: Intercity Express
- Locale: Uttar Pradesh
- First service: 1 September 2012
- Current operator(s): North Central Railways

Route
- Termini: Kanpur Central; Allahabad
- Stops: 6
- Distance travelled: 325 km (202 mi)
- Average journey time: 5 hrs 40 mins
- Service frequency: daily
- Train number(s): 22442 / 22441

On-board services
- Class(es): Second seating
- Seating arrangements: Yes
- Sleeping arrangements: No
- Catering facilities: No
- Observation facilities: Large windows
- Baggage facilities: Above the seats

Technical
- Rolling stock: Standard Indian Railways coaches
- Track gauge: 1,676 mm (5 ft 6 in)
- Operating speed: 110 km/h (68 mph) maximum 65 km/h (40 mph), including halts

The Chitrakootdham (Karwi)–Kanpur Intercity Express (via Allahabad) is an Indian Railways Super fast train which runs between the cities of Kanpur and Chitrakoot Dham (Karwi). It is the much awaited train of North Central Railway, with 14 coaches.

== History ==
The train was flagged off on 01-09-2012 by Union Coal Minister Shri Prakash Jaiswal from Kanpur Central. After sometime it was extended up to Chitrakootdham (Karwi) on 25 February 2018.

== Service ==
The 22442 Kanpur Central - Chitrakootdham (Karwi) Intercity Express covers the distance of 325 km (202 mi) in 5 hours 40 mins (57 km/h) and in 5 hours 40 mins as the 22441 Chitrakootdham (Karwi) - Kanpur Central Intercity Express (57 km/h).

As the average speed of the train is greater than 55 km/h (34 mph), as per railway rules, its fare includes a Superfast surcharge.

== Routing ==
The 22441 / 42 Chitrakootdham (Karwi) - Kanpur Intercity Express runs from Chitrakootdham (Karwi) via Manikpur, Allahabad Junction to Kanpur Central.

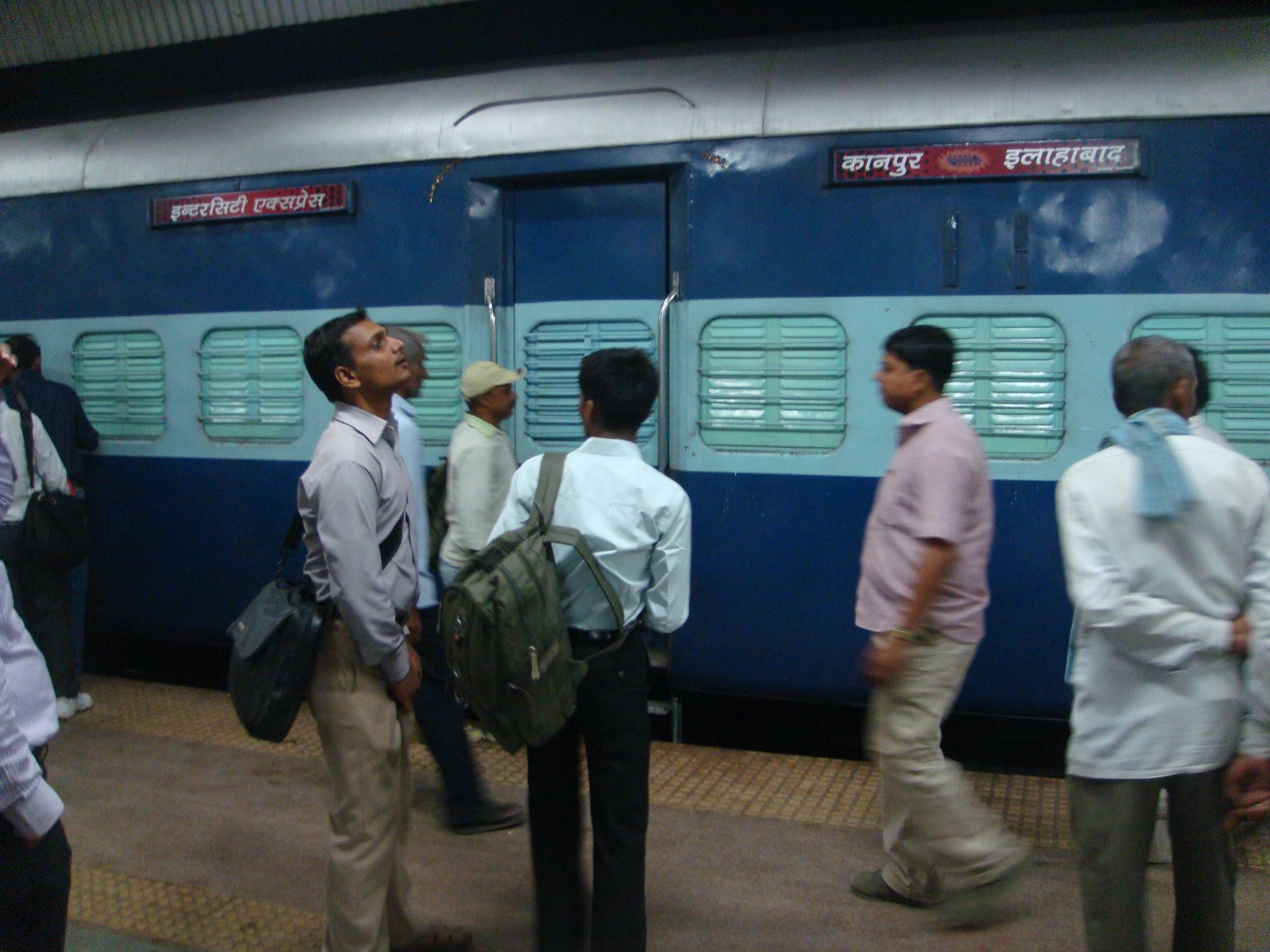
22241 Allahabad Intercity Express

== See also ==
- Kanpur Central
- Shram Shakti Express
- Kanpur New Delhi Shatabdi Express
- Kanpur
- Lucknow-Kanpur Suburban Railway
