= Jaipur–Lucknow Express =

Train in India

Jaipur–Gomti Nagar Express
Overview
- Service type: Express
- First service: 4 February 2014; 11 years ago}
- Current operator: North Western Railway

Route
- Termini: Jaipur Junction (JP); Gomti Nagar (GTNR)
- Stops: 19
- Distance travelled: 684 km (425 mi)
- Average journey time: 14 hrs 25 mins
- Service frequency: Tri-weekly
- Train number: 19715 / 19716

On-board services
- Classes: AC First Class, AC 2 Tier, AC 3 Tier, Sleeper Class, General Unreserved
- Seating arrangements: Yes
- Sleeping arrangements: Yes
- Catering facilities: On-board catering, E-catering
- Observation facilities: Large windows
- Baggage facilities: No
- Other facilities: Below the seats

Technical
- Rolling stock: LHB coach
- Track gauge: 1,676 mm (5 ft 6 in)
- Operating speed: 130 km/h (81 mph) maximum, 49 km/h (30 mph) average including halts.

The 19715 / 19716 Jaipur–Gomti Nagar Express is an Express train belonging to North Western Railway zone of Indian Railways that run between Jaipur Junction and Gomti Nagar in India.

== Background ==
This train was inaugurated on 4 February 2014 and became the direct train running between the two-state capitals of India and also it becomes the 13th train of Jaipur and Lucknow corridor.

== Service ==
The frequency of this train is weekly, it covers the distance of 674 km with an average speed of 50 km/h.

== Routes ==
This train passes through Bandikui Junction, Bharatpur Junction, Achhnera Junction, Mathura Junction, Kasganj Junction and Kanpur Central on both sides.

== Traction ==
As the route is fully electrified, a Ghaziabad Loco Shed-based WAP-7 electric locomotive pulls the train to its destination on both sides.
