= Chitrakootdham (Karwi)–Kanpur Intercity Express =

Indian Railways Express train

Chitrakoot Dham (Karwi)–Kanpur Central Intercity Express
Overview
- Service type: Express
- First service: 26 July 2013; 12 years ago
- Current operator: North Central Railway zone

Route
- Termini: Chitrakoot Dham (Karwi); Kanpur Central
- Stops: 10
- Distance travelled: 213 km (132 mi)
- Average journey time: 5 hours 05 mins
- Service frequency: Daily
- Train number: 14109 / 14110

On-board services
- Class: general unreserved
- Seating arrangements: Yes
- Sleeping arrangements: No
- Catering facilities: No

Technical
- Rolling stock: Standard Indian Railways Coaches
- Operating speed: 45 km/h (28 mph)

The 14109 / 10 Chitrakoot Dham (Karwi)–Kanpur Central Intercity Express is an Express train belonging to Indian Railways North Central Railway zone that runs between Chitrakoot Dham (Karwi) and Kanpur Central in India.

It operates as train number 14109 from Chitrakoot Dham (Karwi) to Kanpur Central and as train number 14110 in the reverse direction serving the states of Uttar Pradesh.

== Coaches ==
The 14109 / 10 Chitrakoot Dham (Karwi)–Kanpur Central Intercity Express has five general unreserved, two SLR (seating with luggage rake) coaches and one reserved 3AC coach now . It does not carry a pantry car coach.

As is customary with most train services in India, coach composition may be amended at the discretion of Indian Railways depending on demand.

== Service ==
The 14109 Chitrakoot Dham (Karwi)–Kanpur Central Intercity Express covers the distance of 213 km (132 mi) in 5 hours 10 mins (41 km/h) and in 4 hours 20 mins as the 14110 Kanpur Central–Chitrakoot Dham (Karwi) Intercity Express (49 km/h).

As the average speed of the train is less than 55 km/h (34 mph), as per railway rules, its fare doesn't include a Superfast surcharge.

== Routing ==
The 14109 / 10 Chitrakoot Dham (Karwi)–Kanpur Central Intercity Express runs from Chitrakoot Dham (Karwi) via Banda, Bhimsen to Kanpur Central.

== Traction ==
As the route is electrified, a Jhansi Junction based WDM-3A diesel locomotive pulls the train to its destination.
