= Chauri Chaura incident =

Massacre of Police in India

Coordinates: 26.64283758611251°N 83.58969448910848°E

[Chauri Chaura Incident]
- Part of Non-cooperation Movement
- Date: 4 February (1922) (Saturday)
- Location: Chauri Chaura, United Provinces, British India (now India)
- Result: Protesters' failure to prevent violence Chauri Chaura police station burnt down with all occupants killed

Parties
Protesters	Indian Imperial Police; United Provinces administration

Lead figures
Bhagwan Ahir, Nazar Ali, Lal Mohammad, Meghu Tiwari and 2,000–2,500 protesters.	Daroga Gupteshwar Singh †

Casualties and losses
3 dead Several wounded	22 dead due to burn injuries
- 225 later arrested with 6 dying in police custody, 19 executed after trial in July 1923, 99 sentenced to varying years of imprisonment with 14 people getting life imprisonment.

The Chauri Chaura Incident took place on 4 February 1922 at Chauri Chaura in the Gorakhpur district of United Provinces (now Uttar Pradesh) in British India. The police fired upon a large group of protesters participating in the non-cooperation movement. In retaliation, the demonstrators attacked and set fire to a police station, killing all of its occupants. The incident led to the deaths of three civilians and 22 policemen. Mohandas Gandhi halted the non-cooperation movement on the national level on 12 February 1922 as a direct result of the incident. Nineteen arrested demonstrators were sentenced to death and 14 to life imprisonment by the British colonial authorities.

== Background ==
From 1920 onwards, Indians, led by Mohandas Gandhi, were engaged in a nationwide non-cooperation movement. Using non-violent methods of civil disobedience known as Satyagraha, protests were organized by the Indian National Congress to challenge oppressive government regulatory measures such as the Rowlatt Act, with the ultimate goal of attaining Swaraj (home rule).

== The incident ==
Two days before the incident, on 2 February 1922, volunteers participating in the non-cooperation movement led by a retired soldier of the British Indian Army named Bhagwan Ahir, protested against high food prices and liquor sales at Gauri Bazaar. The demonstrators were beaten back by the local Daroga (inspector) Gupteshwar Singh and other police officers. Several of the leaders were arrested and put in the lock-up at the Chauri Chaura police station. In response to this, a protest against the police was called on 4 February, to be held at the Bazaar.

On 4 February, approximately 2,000 to 2,500 protesters assembled and began marching towards the market lane at Chauri Chaura. They had gathered to picket the Gauri Bazaar Liquor Shop. Armed police were dispatched to control the situation while the protesters marched towards the bazaar, shouting anti-British slogans. In an attempt to frighten and disperse the crowd, Gupteshwar Singh ordered his 15 local police officers to fire warning shots into the air. This only agitated the crowd who began to throw stones at the police.

With the situation getting out of control, the sub-inspector Prithvi Pal ordered the police to open fire on the advancing crowd, killing three and wounding several others. Reports vary on the reason for the police retreat, with some suggesting that the constables ran out of ammunition while others claimed that the crowd's unexpectedly assertive reaction to the gunfire was the cause. In the ensuing chaos, the heavily outnumbered police fell back to the shelter of the town chowki (police station) while the angry mob advanced. Infuriated by the gunfire into their ranks, the crowd set the chowki a blaze, killing all of the policemen trapped inside, including Inspector Gupteshwar Singh.

The following are the names of the senior officers, constables, and "chaukidars" (government watchmen) who were killed in the incident:

1. Inspector (Daroga) Gupteshwar Singh
2. Sub-Inspector Prithvi Pal
3. Constable Bashir Khan
4. Constable Kapil Dev Singh
5. Constable Visheshwar Ram Yadav
6. Constable Mohammad Ali
7. Constable Hasan Khan
8. Constable Gadabaksh Khan
9. Constable Jama Khan
10. Constable Manglu Chaubey
11. Constable Rambali Pandey
12. Constable Kapil Dev
13. Constable Indrasan Singh
14. Constable Ramlakhan Singh
15. Constable Mardana Khan
16. Constable Jagdev Singh
17. Constable Jaigai Singh
18. Chaukidar Lakhai Singh
19. Chaukidar Wazir
20. Chaukidar Ghisai Ram
21. Chaukidar Jathai Ram
22. Chaukidar Katwaru Ram

One of the constables, Raghuvir Singh, was found to be alive, a few months after the incident. He had been declared dead in the report registered thereafter. He was later produced in court as the sole witness to the incident.

Most victims were burned to death, although several appear to have been killed by the crowd at the entrance to the chowki and their bodies thrown back into the fire. The death count is reported in the literature as either 22 or 23 policemen by different accounts, possibly because of including or excluding the reported death of Raghuvir Singh.

== Aftermath ==
In response to the killing of the police, the British colonial authorities declared martial law in and around Chauri Chaura. Several raids were conducted and hundreds of people were arrested.

Appalled at the outrage, Mohandas Karamchand Gandhi (popularly Mohandas Gandhi) went on a five-day fast as penance for what he perceived as his culpability in the bloodshed. In reflection, Gandhi felt that he had acted too hastily in encouraging people to revolt against the British colonial government without sufficiently emphasizing the importance of ahimsa (non-violence) and without adequately training the people to exercise restraint in the face of attack. He decided that the Indian people were not ready and needed preparation to do what was needed to achieve independence. Mahatama Gandhi was also arrested and sentenced to six years of imprisonment but was later released in February 1924, on grounds of his ill health.

Jawaharlal Nehru and most of the workers of the Congress, who were in prison when Gandhi made this decision, felt that this was a hasty and incorrect decision at a time when the nation was reaching the epoch of support for the Indian independence movement. A few months after this withdrawal, the colonial government arrested M. K. Gandhi and jailed him.

== Trial and conviction ==
A total of 225 people were brought to trial at Gorakhpur Sessions Court of Judge H. E. Holmes, on charges of "rioting and arson" in conjunction with the Chauri Chaura affair. Of these, six died while in police custody, two were sentenced to two years' imprisonment, 170 were convicted and sentenced to death by hanging while 47 were acquitted on 9 January 1923, following a trial which lasted eight months.

A storm of protest erupted over the verdicts, which were characterised as "legalised murder" by Indian communist leader M. N. Roy, who called for a general strike of Indian workers.

On 30 April 1923, the High Court of Allahabad pronounced the final judgements in the case, after appeals had been considered regarding the 170 convicted accused, who had been awarded death sentences:

- The (19) people who were sentenced to death were —

1. Nazar Ali, 2. Bhagwan Ahir, 3. Lal Mohammad, 4. Shyamsundar, 5. Abdullah, 6. Vikram Ahir, 7. Dudhi Singh, 8. Kali Charan, 9. Lauti Kumar, 10. Mahadev Singh, 11. Meghu Tiwari, 12. Raghuvir, 13. Ramlakhan, 14. Ramroop, 15. Sahdev, 16. Rudali, 17. Mohan, 18. Sampat and 19. Sitaram.

- 14 people were sentenced to life imprisonment.
- 19 people were sentenced to 8 years' imprisonment.
- 57 people were sentenced to 5 years' imprisonment.
- 20 people were sentenced to 3 years' imprisonment.
- 3 people were sentenced to 2 years' imprisonment.
- 38 people were acquitted.
- The 19 defendants condemned to death were hanged between 2 and 11 July 1923.

== Memorial ==
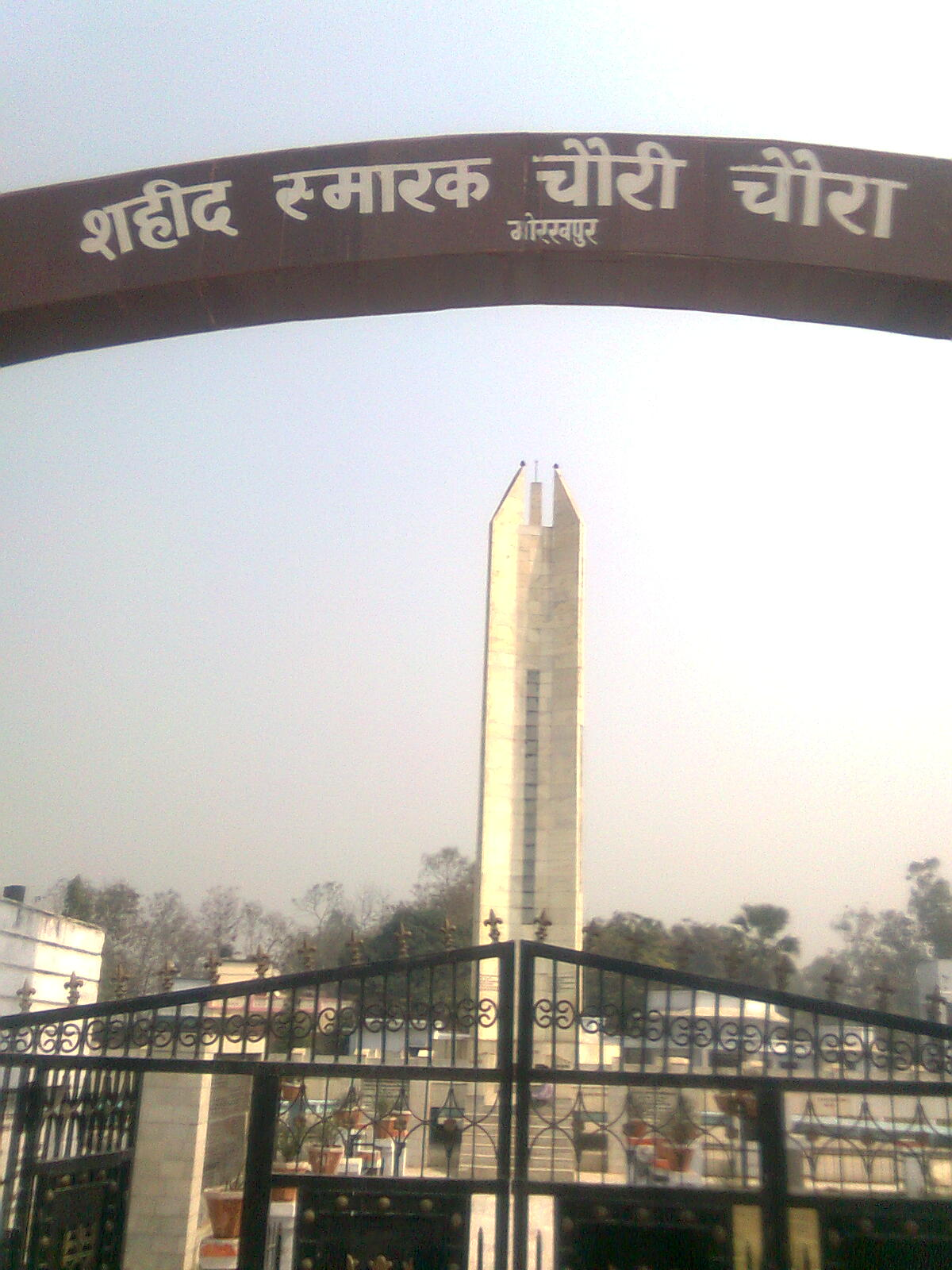
Chauri Chaura Martyrs Memorial. The memorial commemorates those executed after the attack whilst another remembers the police officers.

- A memorial to the dead policemen was dedicated by the British colonial authorities in 1923. Following independence, the words Jai Hind were added to it, as well as a verse by poet Jagdamba Prasad Mishra which is made famous by revolutionary poet Ram Prasad Bismil. The verse reads: Shaheedon ki chitaaon par lagenge har baras mele ("On the pyres of martyrs, there will be fairs every year").
- In 1971, local inhabitants formed an association named Chauri Chaura Shaheed Smarak Samiti. In 1973, this Samiti constructed near the lake at Chauri Chaura a 12.2-metre-tall (40 ft) triangular minaret on each side of which a figure is depicted hanging with a noose around his neck. The minaret was built at a cost of Rs 13,500 contributed by popular subscription.
- Later another Shaheed Smarak (now the main one) was built by the Government of India to honor those hanged after the incident. This tall memorial has names of those executed engraved upon it. A library and museum related to the independence struggle has been set up near the memorial.
- Indian Railways have named a train to honor those executed after the Chauri Chaura incident: the Chauri Chaura Express runs from Gorakhpur to Kanpur.

== In popular culture ==
The incident was depicted in the 2023 movie Pratikar Chauri Chaura.
