= Gomti Nagar railway station =

Railway station in Uttar Pradesh, India

GOMTI NAGAR
- Indian Railways logo

General information
- Location: Vivek Khand, Gomti Nagar, Lucknow, Uttar Pradesh; India
- Coordinates: 26.86°N 81.00°E
- System: Express train and Passenger train station
- Owner: Ministry of Railways (India)
- Operator: Indian Railways
- Lines: Barabanki-Lucknow Suburban Railway, Lucknow–Gorakhpur line, Gomti Nagar–Dilkusha line (under construction), Lucknow–Varanasi line, Lucknow–Gonda–Balrampur
- Platforms: 6
- Tracks: 9
- Connections: Taxi stand, Auto stand

Construction
- Structure type: At grade

Other information
- Status: Active
- Station code: GTNR
- Zone(s): NER
- Division(s): Lucknow NER

Passengers
- 50,000

Services
Location
- Location within Uttar Pradesh Location within India
- Interactive map of Gomti Nagar

Gomti Nagar Railway Terminus (station code GTNR) is a railway station in Gomti Nagar in Lucknow, Uttar Pradesh, India.

The station is part of the North Eastern Railway zone's Lucknow NER Division and the Varanasi–Lucknow line via Ayodhya.

It is also part of the Barabanki-Lucknow Suburban Railway and Lucknow–Gorakhpur line.

This station is an Adarsh category (NSG 3) in North Eastern Railway. This station is situated in eastern Lucknow.

Nearby stations include Badshahnagar (BNZ), Lucknow City (LC) and Lucknow Charbagh (LKO).

== Overview ==
Gomti Nagar Railway Station is a high-revenue station, serving over 50,000 passengers and over 76 Mail/Express trains on a daily basis. It is under the administrative control of the North Eastern Railway zone's Lucknow NER railway division.

Jaunpur Junction is well connected with many important cultural cities such as Delhi, Mumbai, Kolkata, Chennai, Jammu, Chandigarh, Dehradun, Jaipur, Ahmedabad, Bhopal, Lucknow, Patna, Guwahati, Raipur, Rameswaram, Haridwar, Tiruchirappalli, Indore, Surat, Vadodara, Vapi, Nagpur, Mathura, Vijayawada, Agra, Durg, Jamshedpur, Kharagpur, etc.

Its code is GTNR. It serves Gomti Nagar, Indira Nagar, Chinhat, Kamta etc. area of Lucknow city. The station consists of six platforms.

Gomti Nagar is one of the local stations in Lucknow and lies on Barabanki–Lucknow Suburban Railway.

== Redevelopment ==
The Gomti Nagar Railway Station is being redeveloped by the National Buildings Construction Corporation (India).

The redeveloped station is planned to be equipped with amenities such as segregation of arrival and departure, basement parking, CCTV surveillance, centrally air-conditioned common spaces, an integrated building management system, treated water for horticulture use, and more.

The redevelopment would be in two phases.

1. In the first phase mandatory station development comprising station buildings, air concourse, food courts, renovation of platforms and utilities.
2. In the second phase commercial development, including retail, basement parking and external development would be undertaken.

Currently the station is partially opened as the volume of passengers increased but the commercial towers are still under construction.

According to the Rail Land Development Authority (RLDA), the station is scheduled to complete its redevelopment by 2026.
