= Mour Dhwaj Superfast Express =

Train in India

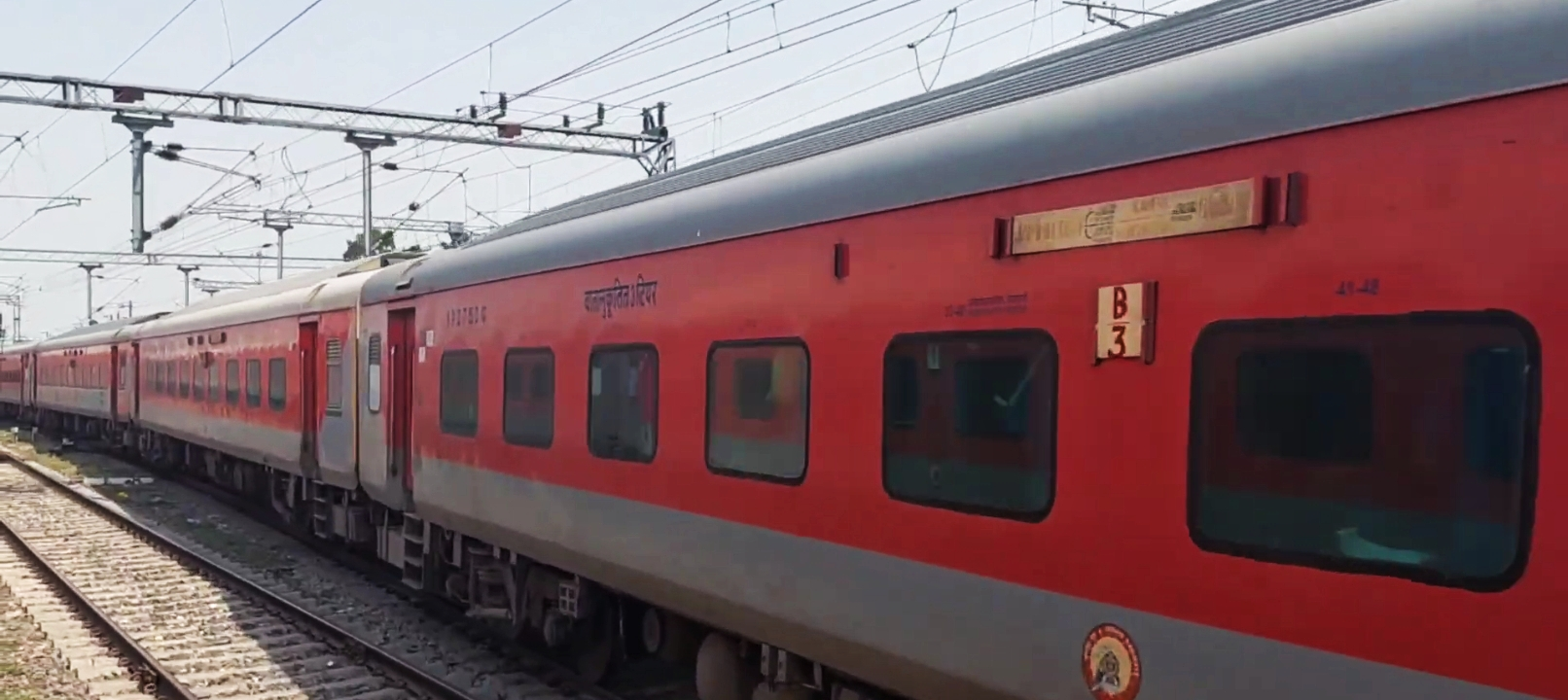
- Mour Dhwaj Superfast Express at Ambala Cantt.

Overview
- Service type: Express
- First service: 20 February 2007; 19 years ago
- Current operator: Northern Railway

Route
- Termini: Jammu Tawi (JAT); Barauni Junction (BJU)
- Stops: 20
- Distance travelled: 1,612 km (1,002 mi)
- Average journey time: 29 hours 10 minutes
- Service frequency: Weekly.
- Train number: 12492 / 12491

On-board services
- Classes: AC 2 Tier, AC 3 Tier, Sleeper Class, General Unreserved
- Seating arrangements: Yes
- Sleeping arrangements: Yes
- Catering facilities: On-board catering, E-catering
- Observation facilities: Large windows
- Baggage facilities: Available
- Other facilities: Below the seats

Technical
- Rolling stock: LHB coach
- Track gauge: 1,676 mm (5 ft 6 in)
- Operating speed: 130 km/h (81 mph) maximum, 56 km/h (35 mph) average including halts.

The 12492 / 12491 Mour Dhwaj Superfast Express is an express train belonging to Indian Railways – Northern Railway zone that runs between Jammu Tawi and Barauni Junction in India.

It operates as train number 12492 from Jammu Tawi to Barauni Junction and as train number 12491 in the reverse direction, serving the 6 states of Jammu and Kashmir, Punjab, Haryana, Uttar Pradesh, Uttarakhand and Bihar.

== Routeing ==
The 12492/12491 Maur Dhawaj Superfast Express runs from Jammu Tawi via Ludhiana Junction, Ambala Cantonment Junction, Saharanpur, Laksar Junction, Moradabad, Bareilly, Shahjahanpur, Sitapur Cantt., Gonda Junction, Gorakhpur Junction, Siwan Junction, Chhapra Junction, Hajipur Junction to Barauni Junction.

== Traction ==
As the route is electrified, a Ghaziabad Loco Shed-based WAP-7 electric locomotive powers the train for its entire journey.

== See also ==
- Jammu Tawi railway station
- Kanpur Central–Jammu Tawi Superfast Express
- Muri Express
