= Kanpur Central–Jammu Tawi Superfast Express =

Train in India

Kanpur Central-Jammu Tawi Superfast Express

Overview
- Service type: Superfast Express
- First service: 30 June 2008; 17 years ago
- Current operator: Northern Railway

Route
- Termini: Kanpur Central (CNB); Jammu Tawi (JAT)
- Stops: 12
- Distance travelled: 1,092 km (679 mi)
- Average journey time: 18 hours 30 minutes
- Service frequency: Bi-weekly. (Note: Runs two days in a week for every direction.)
- Train number: 12469 / 12470

On-board services
- Classes: AC First Class, AC 3 Tier, AC 3 Tier Economy, Sleeper Class, General Unreserved
- Seating arrangements: No
- Sleeping arrangements: Yes
- Catering facilities: On-board catering, E-catering
- Observation facilities: Large windows
- Baggage facilities: Available
- Other facilities: Below the seats

Technical
- Rolling stock: LHB coach
- Track gauge: 1,676 mm (5 ft 6 in)
- Operating speed: 56 km/h (35 mph) average including halts.

The 12469 / 12470 Kanpur Central-Jammu Tawi Superfast Express is a superfast express train of the Indian Railways connecting Kanpur Central in Uttar Pradesh and Jammu Tawi of Jammu and Kashmir. It is currently being operated with 12469/12470 train numbers on twice in a week basis.

== Service ==
The 12469/Kanpur Central - JammuTawi SF Express has an average speed of 55 km/h and covers 1026 km in 18 hrs 30 mins. 12470/JammuTawi - Kanpur Central SF Express has an average speed of 55 km/h and covers 1026 km in 18 hrs 30 mins.

== Route and halts ==
The important halts of the train are:

- Kanpur Central
- Unnao Junction
- Balamau
- Hardoi
- Shahjahanpur
- Bareilly Junction
- Moradabad Junction
- Laksar Junction
- Saharanpur Junction
- Ambala Cantonment Junction
- Ludhiana Junction
- Jalandhar Cantonment Junction
- Pathankot Cantonment
- Jammu Tawi

== Coach composite ==
The train has LHB rakes with max speed of 130 kmph. The train consists of 19 coaches:

- 1 AC First Class
- 2 AC III Tier
- 1 AC III Tier Economy
- 9 Sleeper Coaches
- 4 General Unreserved
- 2 EoG (Generator Cum Luggage Car)

== Traction ==
Both trains are hauled by a Ghaziabad Loco Shed-based WAP-7 electric locomotive from Jammu Tawi to Kanpur Central and vice versa.

== Direction reversal ==
Train Reverses its direction 1 times:

- Balamau Junction

== See also ==
- Kanpur Central railway station
- Jammu Tawi railway station
- Maur Dhawaj Express
- Muri Express
