= Nawabganj Sugar Factory Railway =

Nawabganj Sugar Factory Railway was built in 1932–33 to serve the sugar factory at Nawabganj, Barabanki, Uttar Pradesh. It was connected to the Bengal and North Western Railway (B&NWR) at Barabanki Junction. The B&NWR line and the sugar factory branch were both metre gauge. The line was later dismantled.
