= Barabanki–Lucknow Suburban Railway =

Rail transport in Uttar Pradesh, India

Lucknow–Barabanki Suburban Railway

Overview
- Native name: लखनऊ–बाराबंकी उपनगरीय रेलवे
- Status: Operational
- Owner: Indian Railways
- Locale: Uttar Pradesh, India
- Termini: Lucknow Charbagh; Barabanki Junction

Service
- Type: Suburban railway
- Services: NR and NER routes
- Operator(s): Northern Railway; North Eastern Railway
- Rolling stock: EMU; MEMU

Technical
- Line length: 28–29 km (17–18 mi) (LKO–BBK, NR route); 36–37 km (22–23 mi) (LJN–BBK, NER route)
- Character: Commuter rail
- Track gauge: 5 ft 6 in (1,676 mm) Indian gauge
- Electrification: 25 kV 50 Hz AC overhead catenary

Barabanki–Lucknow Suburban Railway is a commuter rail service operated by Northern Railways, North Central Railway and North Eastern Railway to connect Lucknow with Barabanki. These services are mostly run using EMU and MEMU rakes. However it does not have dedicated suburban tracks but share the tracks with long distance trains. Locally it is called BL meaning Barabanki Lucknow (while LC means Lucknow Cawnpore).

== Distance and time ==
- Distance between Lucknow (LKO) and Barabanki Jn (BBK) is 28–29 km (NR route).
- Distance between Lucknow Jn (LJN) and Barabanki Jn (BBK) is 36–37 km (NER route).
- Most of the LSB trains cover the whole journey within 50 minutes via NR route (28–29 km) (NR route).
- Most of the LGB trains cover the whole journey within 1 hour 30 minutes via NER route (36–37 km) (NER route).
- Intercity and other Superfast trains take 40 minutes to 1 hour 10 minutes. (Amrapali Express takes exactly 40 minutes for whole journey while Ganga Sutlej Express takes exactly 1 hour 10 minutes.)

== MEMU/EMU and passenger trains ==
=== Barabanki to Lucknow ===
==== NR route ====
Stations	Distance from source	Event	64231
Barabanki Jn	0 km	departure	10:10
Safedabad	7 km	departure	10:21
Jugaur	11 km	departure	10:28
Malhour	16 km	departure	10:35
Lucknow	28 km	Arrival	11:00

==== NER route ====
Stations	Distance from source	Event	64271
Barabanki Jn	0 km	departure	13:10
Safedabad	7 km	departure	13:21
Jugaur	11 km	departure	13:27
Malhour	17 km	departure	13:37
Gomati Nagar	21 km	departure	13:43
Badshahnagar	25 km	departure	13:50
Daliganj	29 km	departure	17:40
Lucknow City	31 km	departure	13:58
Aishbagh	34 km	departure	14:04
Lucknow Jn	36 km	Arrival	14:45

=== Lucknow to Barabanki ===
==== NR route ====
Stations	Event	2LSB	4LSB
Lucknow	departure	11:05	13:40
Malhour	departure	11:26	14:03
Jugaur	departure	11:33	14:12
Safedabad	departure	11:39	14:20
Barabanki Jn	Arrival	11:38	14:35

==== NER route ====
Stations	Event	64274
Lucknow Jn	departure	18:15
Aishbagh	departure	18:26
Lucknow City	departure	18:40
Daliganj	departure	18:46
Badshahnagar	departure	19:07
Gomati Nagar	departure	19:15
Malhour	departure	19:24
Jugaur	departure	19:30
Safedabad	departure	19:36
Barabanki Jn	Arrival	19:45

== See also ==
- Lucknow–Kanpur Suburban Railway
- Cawnpore–Barabanki Railway
- Barabanki Junction
- Lucknow Charbagh railway station
- Indian Railways
