= Laksar Junction railway station =

Railway station in Uttarakhand

Laksar Junction
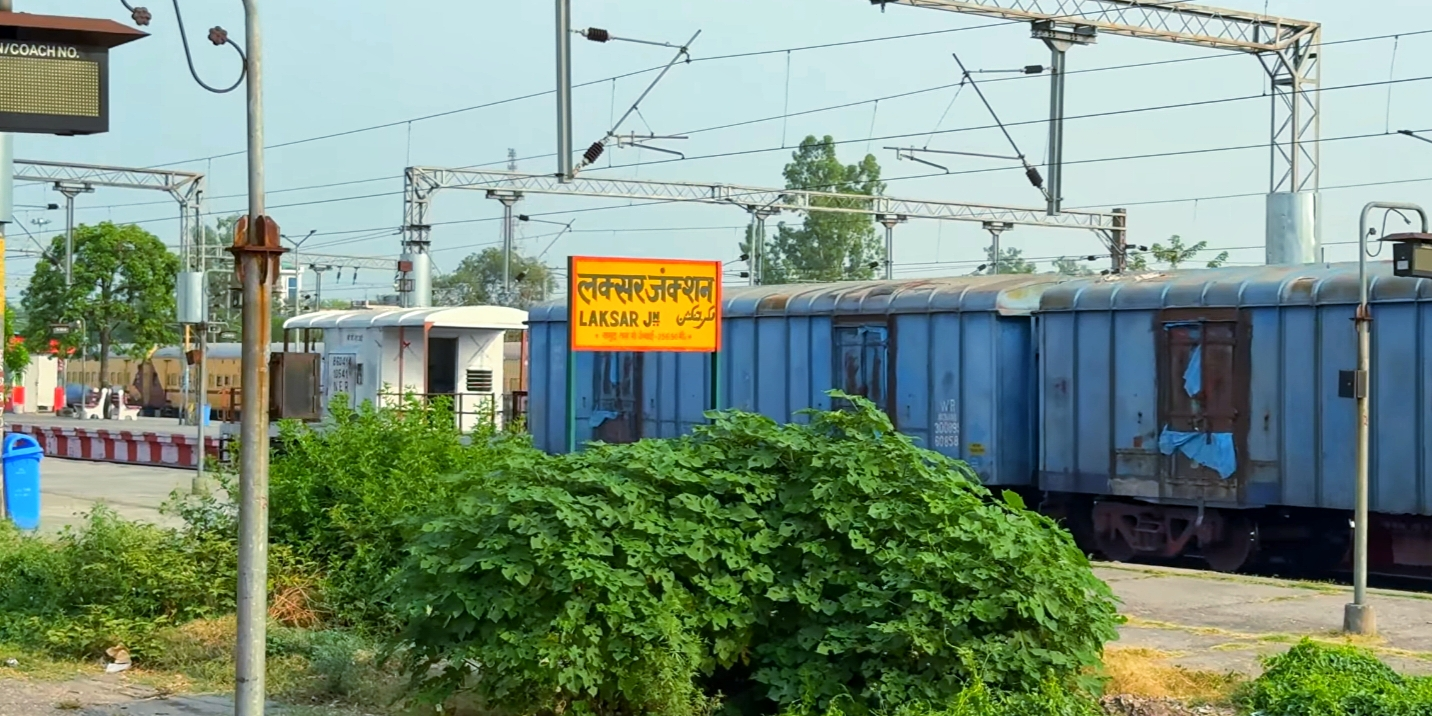
- Laksar Junction

General information
- Location: Main Bazar NH-334A, Laksar, Uttarakhand; India
- Coordinates: 29.7528°N 78.0195°E
- Elevation: 287 metres (942 ft)
- System: Indian Railways station
- Owner: Indian Railways
- Operator: Northern Railways
- Lines: Laksar–Dehradun line Moradabad–Ambala line
- Platforms: 6
- Tracks: 11

Construction
- Structure type: At grade
- Parking: Yes

Other information
- Status: Active
- Station code: LRJ
- Zone(s): Northern Railway
- Division(s): Moradabad
- Fare zone: Northern Railway zone, Moradabad Division

History
- Opened: 1866
Location
- Location within Uttarakhand Location within India

Laksar Junction railway station is a railway station located in Laksar, a small city in Haridwar district in the Indian state of Uttarakhand.

Laksar Junction railway station (code LRJ) is a major railway station in Uttarakhand, the largest railway junction in the state. It opened in 1866 when the Awadh-Rohilkhand Railway line was extended to Saharanpur. It was first connected with city of Haridwar through branch line in 1886, when the Awadh and Rohilakhand Railway line was extended through Roorkee to Saharanpur, this was later extended to Dehradun in 1900.

== Overview ==
The station serves Laksar city and environs. Laksar Junction is an A Category station under the Moradabad Division of the Northern Railway. It is one of the busiest stations in Uttarakhand in terms of frequency and the second largest in number of platforms. This station has 6 platforms serving Mail/Express, Superfast Express, Garib Rath Express, Antyodaya Express and local trains passing.

The station has direct connectivity with major cities, including Delhi, Mumbai, Kolkata, Amritsar, Chandigarh, Meerut, Jabalpur, Lucknow, Agra, Guwahati, Surat, Prayagraj, Patna, Dhanbad, Gorakhpur, Darbhanga, Kamakhya, Kota, Jammu, Aligarh, Mathura, Ayodhya, Ramnagar, Kathgodam, Haridwar, Dehradun and Rishikesh. Nearly 90 trains stop at Laksar Junction on a daily, weekly or bi-weekly basis.

Laksar Junction railway station is located at the junction point of Dehradun, Saharanpur and Moradabad. It is an interchange station for the trains coming from Saharanpur, Dehradun, Haridwar and Rishikesh, including several trains such as Kanpur Central-Jammu Tawi Superfast Express, Kamakhya-Shri Mata Vaishno Devi Katra Express, Maur Dhawaj Express and Darbhanga-Jalandhar City Antyodaya Express.
