= Lucknow Upnagariya Parivahan Sewa =

Bus Services for suburban areas of Lucknow under government undertaking

Lucknow Upnagariya Parivahan sewa
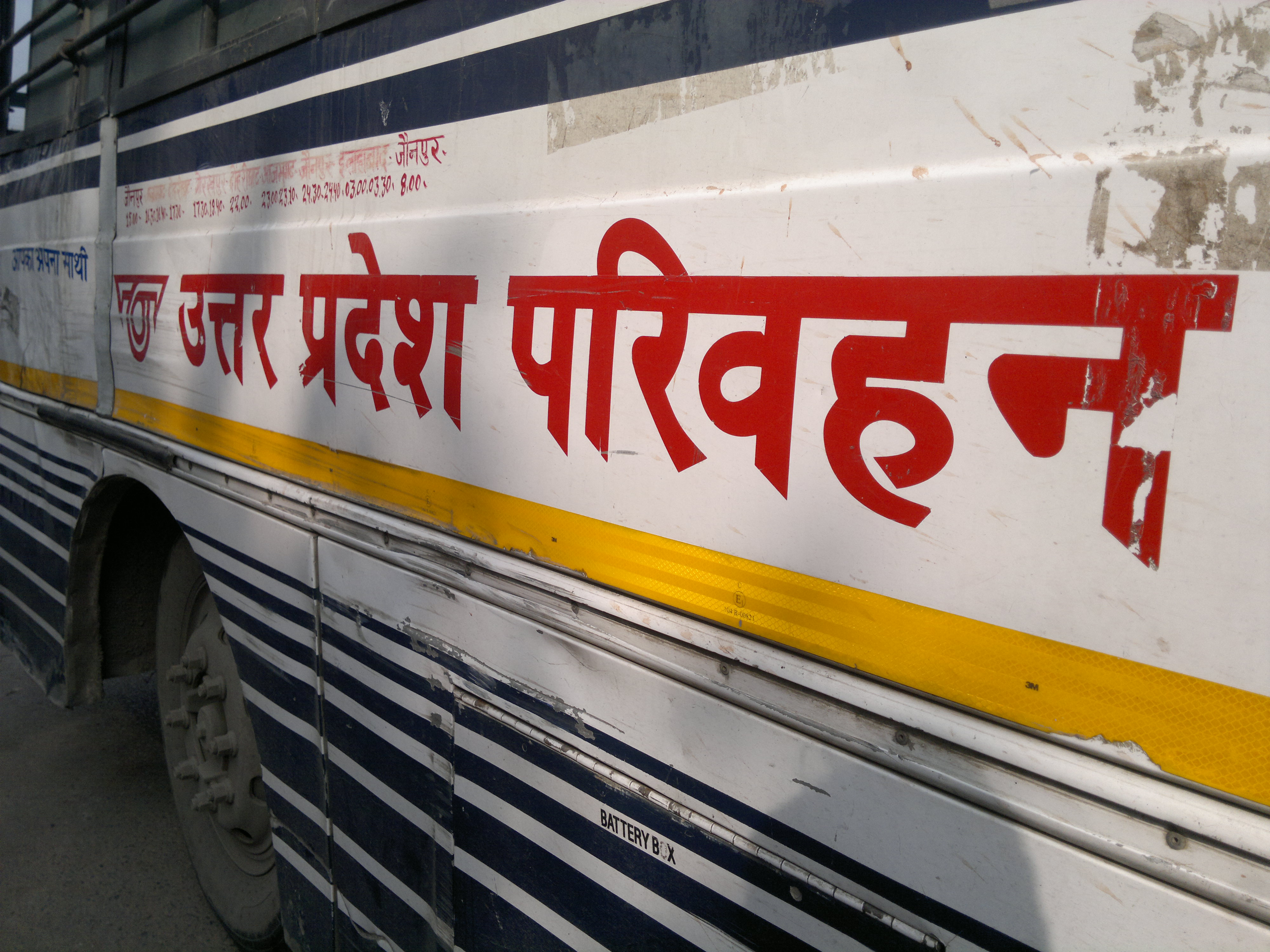
- Founded: 2006
- Defunct: 2011
- Service area: Lucknow city suburban towns and tehsils of Lucknow district
- Service type: Ordinary
- Operator: UPSRTC

Lucknow Upnagariya Parivahan Sewa was a suburban bus service of Uttar Pradesh State Road Transport Corporation which operated primarily in the city of Lucknow, suburban towns and tehsils of Lucknow district and neighbouring districts.

== Operations ==
Its operation started in 2006, its objective was to connect Lucknow with the surrounding villages and tehsils. After running for few years, it was closed in 2011 permanently.
