= Kannauj railway station =

Railway Station in Uttar Pradesh, India

- Indian Railways logo

General information
- Location: NH 34, Saraimeera, Kannauj, Uttar Pradesh; India
- Elevation: 143 metres (469 ft)
- System: Indian Railways station
- Owner: Indian Railways
- Operator: North Eastern Railway
- Line: Kanpur–Mathura section
- Platforms: 2
- Tracks: 3

Construction
- Structure type: At grade
- Parking: yes
- Cycle facilities: yes

Other information
- Status: Contraction single line electrification
- Station code: KJN
- Zone(s): Northern Eastern Railway
Location
- Location within India Location within Uttar Pradesh

Kannauj railway station is a railway station in Kannauj district, Uttar Pradesh. Its code is KJN. It serves as a Railway Station for Kannauj city. The station has two platforms. It operates under the North Eastern Railway Zone. There are two platforms in the Station.

== Trains ==
- Utsarg Express
- Kalindi Express
- Kanpur Central–Kasganj Express
- Farrukhabad–Kanpur Anwarganj Express
- Chhapra–Mathura Superfast Express
- Jaipur–Lucknow Express
- Kanpur Central–Anand Vihar Terminal Express
- Kolkata–Agra Cantonment Express
- Bandra Terminus–Lucknow Weekly Express
- Kanpur Central–Bandra Terminus Weekly Express
- Udaipur City–Patliputra Humsafar Express

== Location and Infrastructure ==
The station is situated on National Highway 91 in Saraimeera, Kannauj, and is elevated at 143 meters (469 feet). Kannauj Railway Station has two platforms and three tracks. The station is equipped with standard on-ground station infrastructure, including parking facilities and bicycle facilities.

In January 2025, an under-construction lintel at the station collapsed, trapping several workers. A massive rescue operation was conducted, and all workers were safely rescued, though some sustained injuries. The incident occurred during construction work under the Atal Mission for Rejuvenation and Urban Transformation (AMRUT) project, aimed at improving the station's infrastructure.
