= Chauri Chaura =

- Town
- Location in Uttar Pradesh, India
- Country: India
- State: Uttar Pradesh
- District: Gorakhpur

Languages
  - Official: Hindi
- Time zone: UTC+5:30 (IST)
- PIN: 273201

Chauri Chaura (Pargana: Haveli, Tehsil: Chauri Chaura) is a town near Gorakhpur, Uttar Pradesh, India. The town is located at a distance of 26 km from Gorakhpur, on the State Highway between Gorakhpur and Deoria. The town railway station is located 25 km south-east of Gorakhpur Junction.

In 1922, the Chauri Chaura incident took place in the town when protesters set fire to a police station and killed at least 22 policemen in retaliation for the police firing on several protesters who had taken part in the non-cooperation movement as part of the Indian freedom struggle. This incident is depicted in the movie Gandhi.
