= Lucknow–Kanpur Suburban Railway =

Railway line connecting Kanpur and Lucknow in Uttar Pradesh, India

Kanpur–Lucknow Main Line

Overview
- Native name: कानपुर–लखनऊ मुख्य रेल मार्ग
- Status: Operational
- Owner: Indian Railways
- Locale: Uttar Pradesh, India
- Termini: Kanpur Central; Lucknow Charbagh

Service
- Type: Railway line
- Operator(s): Northern Railway; North Eastern Railway; North Central Railway

History
- Opened: 1867

Technical
- Line length: 71 km (44 mi)
- Track gauge: 5 ft 6 in (1,676 mm) Indian gauge
- Electrification: 25 kV 50 Hz AC overhead catenary

Kanpur–Lucknow Main Line is a railway line in Uttar Pradesh connecting Kanpur and Lucknow, the capital of the state. The line is about 71 km (44 mi) long and is one of the main railway routes between the two cities.

The line is used by passenger, express, suburban and freight trains. It is electrified and carries trains throughout the day between Kanpur and Lucknow.

Major stations on the line include Kanpur Central, Unnao Junction, Lucknow Junction and Lucknow Charbagh.

== EMU and MEMU trains ==
=== Lucknow to Kanpur ===
Stations	Event	64202	64251	64203	64205	64207	64209	64253	64211	64255	64213	64257
Lucknow/Lucknow Jn.	Departure	04:10	05:40	07:20	09:35	11:20	14:00	15:10	15:55	18:30	20:10	21:40
Manak Nagar	Departure	04:23	05:54	07:33	09:48	11:33	14:18	15:24	16:08	18:43	20:23	21:55
Amausi	Departure	04:29	06:03	07:39	09:54	11:39	14:26	15:30	16:14	18:49	20:29	22:02
Piparsand	Departure	04:35	06:06	07:45	10:00	11:45	14:34	15:36	16:20	18:55	20:35	22:08
Harauni	Departure	04:41	06:12	07:51	10:06	11:51	14:42	15:46	16:26	19:01	20:41	22:14
Jaitipur	Departure	04:48	06:19	07:58	10:13	11:58	14:51	15:52	16:33	19:08	20:48	22:21
Kusumbhi	Departure	04:53	06:24	08:03	10:18	12:03	14:56	15:57	16:38	19:13	20:53	22:26
Ajgain	Departure	04:58	06:29	08:09	10:23	12:08	15:01	16:03	16:43	19:18	20:57	22:31
Sonik	Departure	05:07	06:36	08:15	10:30	12:15	15:07	16:10	16:53	19:25	21:05	22:39
Unnao Junction	Departure	05:15	06:44	08:27	10:38	12:24	15:15	16:20	17:03	19:43	21:13	22:51
Magarwara	Departure	05:27	06:56	08:39	10:50	12:36	15:27	16:30	17:16	19:55	21:25	23:03
Kanpur Bridge	Departure	05:41	07:08	08:52	11:03	12:48	15:38	16:42	17:28	20:07	21:37	23:15
Kanpur Central	Arrival	05:55	07:20	09:05	11:15	13:00	15:50	17:00	17:40	20:25	21:50	23:38
Kanpur Anwarganj	Departure	xxxx	xxxx	xxxx	xxxx	xxxx	xxxx	17:13	xxxx	20:36	xxxx	xxxx
Rawatpur	Departure	xxxx	xxxx	xxxx	xxxx	xxxx	xxxx	17:25	xxxx	20:43	xxxx	xxxx
Kalyanpur	Arrival	xxxx	xxxx	xxxx	xxxx	xxxx	xxxx	17:35	xxxx	20:50	xxxx	xxxx

=== Kanpur to Lucknow ===
Stations	Event	64202	64260	64204	64206	64208	64210	64212	64252	64214	64216	64254
Panki	Departure	xxxx	06:00	xxxx	xxxx	xxxx	xxxx	xxxx	xxxx	xxxx	xxxx	xxxx
Govindpuri	Departure	xxxx	06:10	xxxx	xxxx	xxxx	xxxx	xxxx	xxxx	xxxx	xxxx	xxxx
Kalianpur	Departure	xxxx	xxxx	xxxx	xxxx	xxxx	xxxx	xxxx	xxxx	17:45	21:05	xxxx
Rawatpur	Departure	xxxx	xxxx	xxxx	xxxx	xxxx	xxxx	xxxx	xxxx	17:52	21:13	xxxx
Kanpur Anwarganj	Departure	xxxx	xxxx	xxxx	xxxx	xxxx	xxxx	xxxx	xxxx	18:00	21:20	xxxx
Kanpur Central	Departure	05:00	06:30	07:35	09:15	10:45	11:45	14:05	16:20	18:15	21:35	22:25
Kanpur Bridge	Departure	05:09	06:39	07:44	09:24	10:54	11:54	14:14	16:29	18:24	21:45	22:34
Magarwara	Departure	05:16	06:46	07:51	09:31	11:01	12:01	14:21	16:36	18:31	21:52	22:41
Unnao Jn.	Departure	05:24	06:54	07:59	09:39	11:09	12:09	14:29	16:44	18:39	22:01	22:49
Sonik	Departure	05:34	07:02	08:07	09:47	11:17	12:17	14:37	16:52	18:47	22:08	22:57
Ajgain	Departure	05:41	07:08	08:13	09:53	11:23	12:24	14:43	16:58	18:53	22:15	23:03
Kusumbhi	Departure	05:48	07:13	08:18	09:58	11:28	12:29	14:48	17:03	18:58	22:20	23:08
Jaitipur	Departure	05:54	07:18	08:23	10:03	11:33	12:34	14:53	17:08	19:03	22:25	23:13
Harauni	Departure	06:04	07:27	08:32	10:12	11:42	12:43	15:02	17:17	19:12	22:54	23:22
Piparsand	Departure	06:13	07:42	08:38	10:18	11:48	12:49	15:08	17:23	19:18	23:02	23:28
Amausi	Departure	06:22	07:59	08:48	10:27	11:58	12:58	15:23	17:33	19:24	23:17	23:34
Manak Nagar	Departure	06:29	08:04	08:59	10:38	12:08	13:09	15:29	17:49	19:39	23:32	23:50
Lucknow Jn.	Arrival	06:50	08:20	09:15	10:55	12:40	13:25	15:40	18:05	19:55	23:45	00:05

NOTE

- 64260 originates from Panki at 6:00 am via Govindpuri Railway Station.
- 64214 originates from Kanpur Anwarganj at 6:00 pm .

== Other Trains ==
=== Kanpur to Lucknow ===
Train Name	Train No.	Kanpur Central	Lucknow Jn
Jhansi-LKO Pass	51813	Arrival: 09:15; Departure: 09:27	Arrival: 11:20; Departure: --
Kasganj-LKO Pass	55326	Arrival: 21:30; Departure: 21:40	Arrival: 23:45; Departure: --
Agra-LKO Intercity	12180	Arrival: 10:10; Departure: 10:15	Arrival: 11:45; Departure: --
Jhansi-Lko Intercity	11109	Arrival: 10:20; Departure:10:30	Arrival: 12:00; Departure: --
Varuna Express	24228	Arrival: -- Departure: 16:00	Arrival: 17:30; Departure: 17:50
Kanpur-Pratapgarh Intercity	14124	Arrival: -- Departure: 17:35	Arrival: 19:00; Departure: 19:10

=== Lucknow to Kanpur ===
Train Name	Train No.	Lucknow Jn	Kanpur Central
LKO-Jhansi Pass	51814	Arrival: -- Departure: 16:40	Arrival: 18:50; Departure: 19:00
LKO-Kasganj Pass	55325	Arrival: -- Departure: 04:30	Arrival: 06:35; Departure: 06:40
LKO-Agra Intercity	12179	Arrival: -- Departure: 15:45	Arrival: 17:25; Departure: 17:30
LKO-Jhansi Intercity	11110	Arrival: -- Departure: 16:30	Arrival: 18:15; Departure: 18:30
Varuna Express	14227	Arrival: 09:50; Departure: 10:00	Arrival: 11:35; Departure: --
Pratapgarh-Kanpur Intercity	14123	Arrival: 08:05; Departure: 08:10	Arrival: 09:35; Departure: --

== See also ==
- Barabanki-Lucknow Suburban Railway
- Cawnpore-Barabanki Railway
- Kanpur Central
- Charbagh Railway Station
- Indian Railways
- Kanpur Lucknow Roadways Service
