= Chitrakoot Express =

Train in India

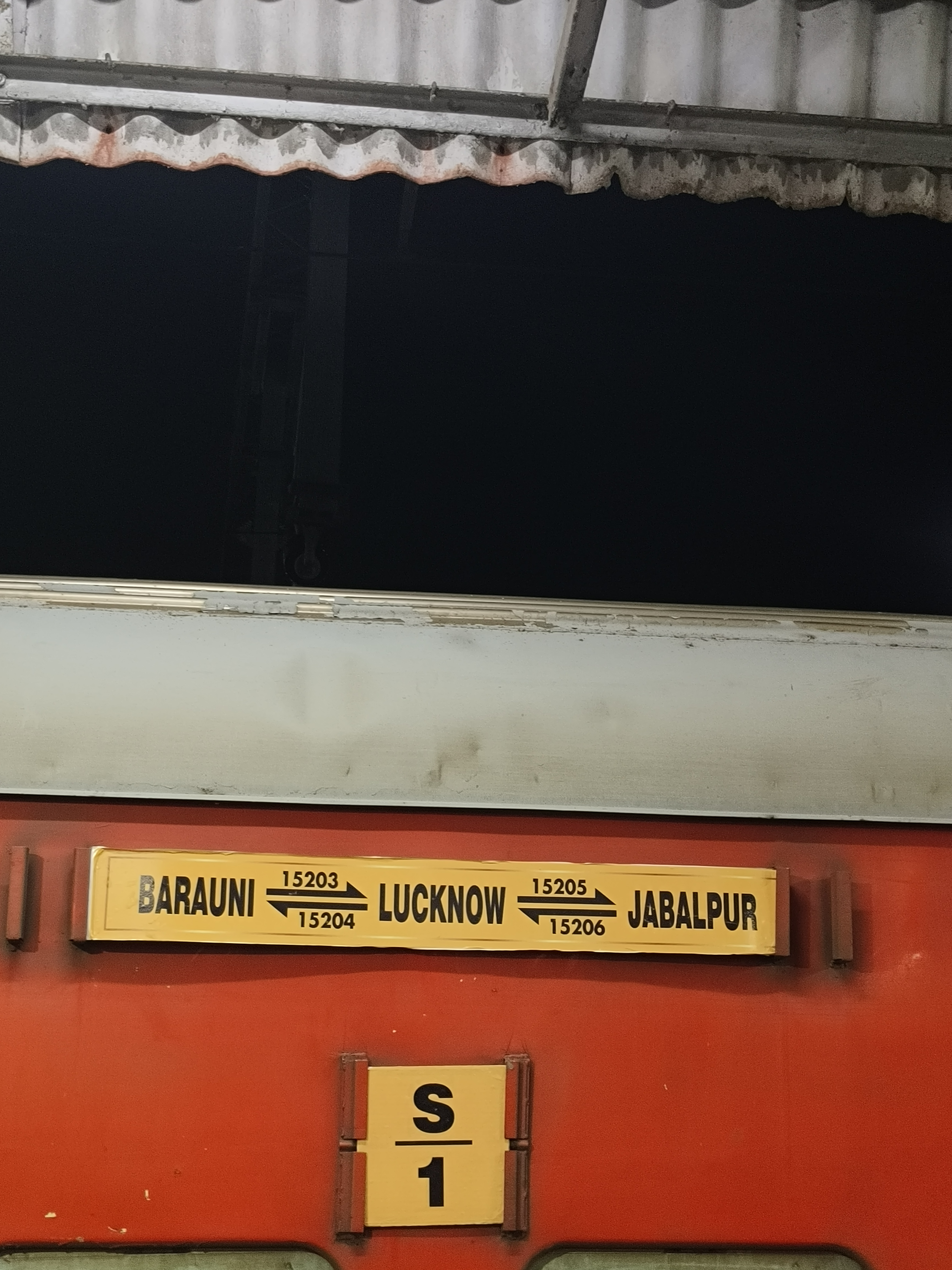
- Train Board

Overview
- Service type: Express
- Locale: Madhya Pradesh & Uttar Pradesh
- First service: 1 April 1965; 61 years ago
- Current operator: West Central Railway

Route
- Termini: Jabalpur Junction (JBP); Lucknow Junction (LJN)
- Stops: 18
- Distance travelled: 582 km (362 mi)
- Average journey time: 12 hrs 10 mins
- Service frequency: Daily
- Train number: 15205 / 15206

On-board services
- Classes: AC First, AC 2 Tier, AC 3 Tier, Sleeper Class, General Unreserved,
- Seating arrangements: Yes
- Sleeping arrangements: Yes
- Catering facilities: On-board catering, E-catering
- Observation facilities: Large windows
- Baggage facilities: Available
- Other facilities: Below the seats

Technical
- Rolling stock: LHB coach
- Track gauge: Broad Gauge
- Operating speed: 49 km/h (30 mph) average including halts.

The 15205 / 15206 Chitrakoot Express is a daily Express train of the Indian Railways, which runs between Jabalpur, an important city & military cantonment hub of Central Indian state Madhya Pradesh and Lucknow railway station, the capital city of Uttar Pradesh.

== Arrival and departure ==
Train no.15205 departs from Lucknow Junction (LJN) daily at 05:30 PM reaching Jabalpur (JBP) the next day at 05:40 AM. Train no.15206 departs from Jabalpur (JBP) daily at 08:50 PM, reaching Lucknow (LJN) the next day at 09:30 AM.

== Coach composite ==
Coach Composition
🚆 Coach Type	Number of Coaches
🛌 AC I & II Tier	1
🛏️ AC III Tier	5
🛋️ Sleeper Class	6
🚉 Unreserved	4
AC 3 Economy	1
📦 Luggage/Brake Van	2

== Average speed and frequency ==
The train runs with an average speed of around 48 km/h. The train runs on a daily basis.

== Traction ==
The train is hauled by an Itarsi Loco Shed based WAP-7 electric locomotive from end to end.

== Rake Sharing & Maintenance ==
Chitrakkot Express is Having 4 LHB Rakes and shared it Rakes By 15203 & 15204 Barauni - Lucknow - Barauni Express The train is maintained by the Jabalpur & Barauni Coaching Depot.

== See also ==
- Dayodaya Express
- Jabalpur Junction
- Bhopal Junction
