= Fatehgarh railway station =

Railway station in Uttar Pradesh, India

- Indian Railways logo

General information
- Location: Bewar Road, Fatehgarh, Uttar Pradesh; India
- Coordinates: 27.3703°N 79.6207°E
- Elevation: 152 metres (499 ft)
- System: Indian Railways station
- Owner: Indian Railways
- Operator: North Eastern Railway
- Platforms: 2
- Tracks: 4
- Connections: Auto stand

Construction
- Structure type: At grade

Other information
- Status: Single electric line
- Station code: FGR
- Zone(s): Northern Eastern Railway
- Division(s): Izzatnagar

History
- Electrified: complete(2020)

Passengers
- 4990 approx daily footfalls
Location
- Location within India Location within Uttar Pradesh

Fatehgarh railway station is a small railway station in Farrukhabad district, Uttar Pradesh. Its code is FGR. It serves Fatehgarh city. The station consists of two platforms. The platforms are not well sheltered. It lacks many facilities including water and sanitation.
