= Kanpur Central railway station =

Rail station in Uttar Pradesh, India

Kanpur Central
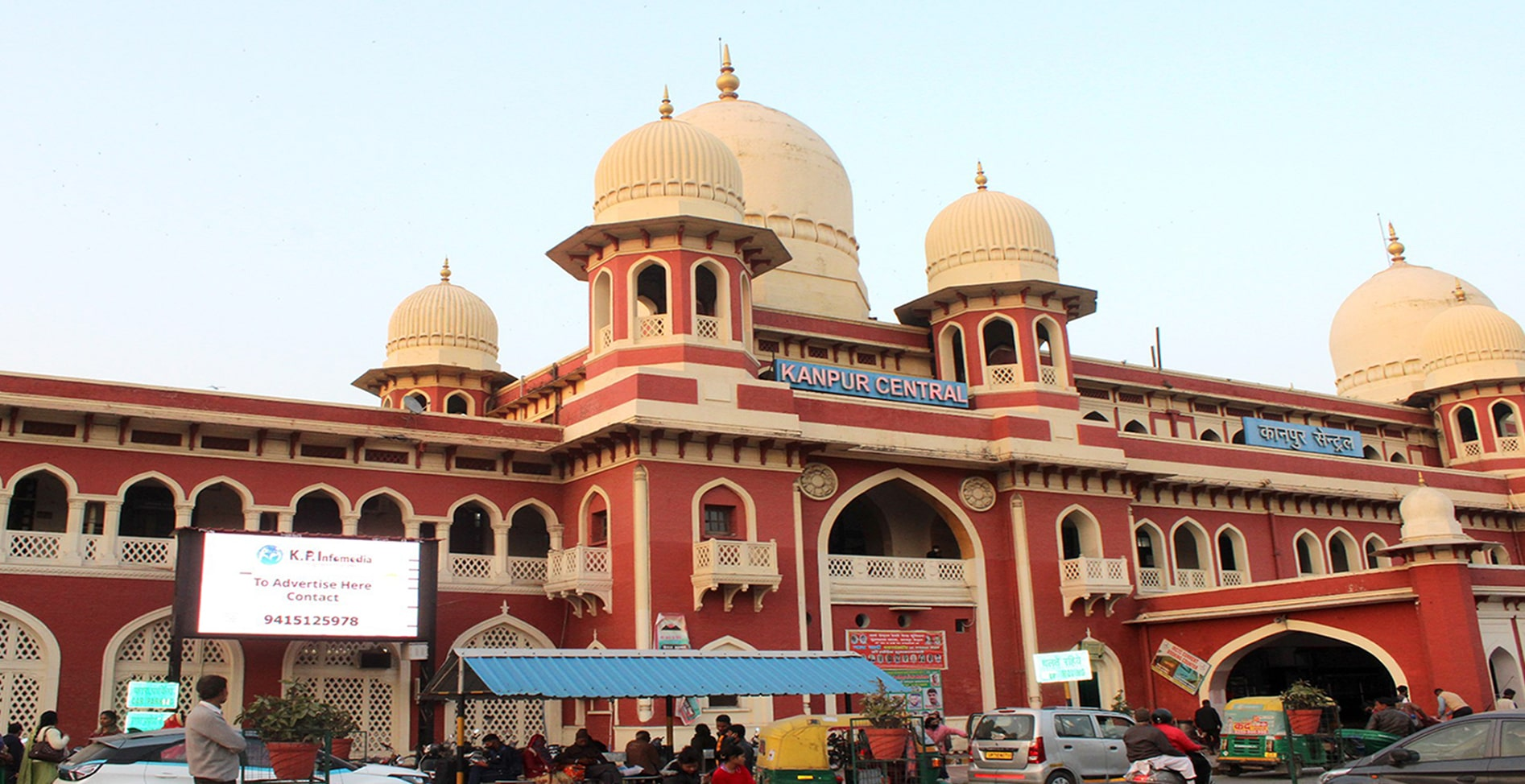
- Kanpur Central station

General information
- Location: Cantt Side: Central Station Lane, Mirpur Cantt; City Side: Ghantaghar Crossing; Kanpur, Uttar Pradesh; India
- Coordinates: 26.4539°N 80.3512°E
- Elevation: 126.630 metres (415.45 ft)
- System: Indian Railways station
- Operator: Indian Railways
- Lines: New Delhi–Gaya–Howrah main line, New Delhi–Howrah main line, Kanpur–Unnao–Lucknow line, Tundla–Agra section, Kanpur–Farrukhabad–Kasganj line, Kanpur–Banda–Chitrakoot line, Kanpur–Pandit Deen Dayal Upadhyaya Junction section, Jhansi–Kanpur section,
- Platforms: 10 (6 under construction)
- Tracks: 28
- Connections: Orange Line Kanpur Central

Construction
- Structure type: At grade
- Parking: Available
- Cycle facilities: Available
- Architectural style: Indo-Saracenic

Other information
- Status: Functioning
- Station code: CNB
- Zone(s): North Central Railway
- Division(s): Prayagraj
- Classification: NSG-2

History
- Opened: 1930
- Electrified: 1972 from Howrah; 5 August 1976 till New Delhi
- Former names: Indian Branch Rly. Co. Northern Railways
- Computerized Ticketing Counters Luggage Checking System Parking Disabled Access Food Plaza Kiosks WC Taxi Stand Public Transportation
Location
- Location within Uttar Pradesh
- Interactive map

Kanpur Central (formerly known as Cawnpore North Barracks, station code: CNB) is a central and junction railway station in the city of Kanpur and is one of the five central Indian railway stations. It is third busiest in country after Howrah Jn and New Delhi railway station. It is a major railway station between Howrah Jn and New Delhi. After Bandel Junction and Kharagpur Junction, it holds the record for the 3rd largest interlocking route system in the world. All trains passing through this station stop here, including premium trains, and all superfast, mail and passenger trains. The station is a major intercity rail and commuter rail station in the region.

== Current and future development ==
Kanpur Central has undergone a beautification and modernisation effort in recent years, especially following the inclusion of the station in the "50 World-Class Railway Stations" budget, which sought to modernise Indian railway stations, by former Minister of Railways Mamata Banerjee. These efforts mainly include the improvement of services offered to customers and the redevelopment of existing features, such as the installation of a new platform surface at platform number one. The current phase of development is mainly focused on the cleaning up of the side of the station facing the city, with ₹15 million being budgeted to go towards the project. A food plaza is designated to be built on the second floor and two new car parks are also being proposed.

According to a NCR report the station needs at least 10 more platforms to support the ever-increasing passenger amount. At present, the re-modelling work is proceeding very slowly, but senior NCR officials are hopeful of keeping their promises.

=== Transport ===
A three-layer underground car park has been proposed as well as the installation of two escalators leading to the footbridges passing over the railway lines. By 2010 a new footbridge was constructed at the west end of the station.

== Major trains ==
Major trains that originate from Kanpur Central are:-

- Kanpur Central–New Delhi Shram Shakti Express
- Kanpur–New Delhi Shatabdi Express
- Kanpur Central–Anand Vihar Terminal Express
- Kanpur Central–Bandra Terminus Weekly Express
- Kanpur Central–Kathgodam Garib Rath Express
- Prayag Ghat–Kanpur Intercity Express (Via Unnao Jn, Unchahar)
- Pratapgarh–Kanpur Intercity Express
- Chitrakootdham (Karwi)–Kanpur Intercity Express
- Kanpur Central–Bhiwani Junction Kalindi Express
- Kanpur Central–Valsad Udyog Karmi Express
- Kanpur Central–Jammu Tawi Superfast Express
- Kanpur Central–Amritsar Weekly Express
- Kanpur Central–Durg Junction Betwa Express
- Kanpur Central–Prayag Ghat Special Express (Via Unnao Jn, Unchahar)
- Kanpur Central–Rae Bareli Jn Special Express (Via Unnao Jn, Unchahar)
- Kanpur Central–Balamau Jn Special Express

== Electric Loco Shed ==
Kanpur Loco Shed holds electric locomotives like WAP-4, WAP-7, WAG-7 & WAG-9.

It is currently holds 15 WAP-4, 50+ WAP-7, 70+ WAG-7 & 90+ WAG-9 locomotives respectively.

== See also ==
- Indian Railways
- Lucknow–Kanpur Suburban Railway
- Cawnpore–Burhwal Railway
- Cawnpore–Barabanki Railway
- Kanpur Bridge Left Bank railway station
- Chitrakootdham (Karwi)–Kanpur Intercity Express (via Allahabad)
