= Cawnpore–Barabanki Railway =

Indian railway

Cawnpore–Barabanki Railway (1943-1953) Cawnpore–Burhwal Railway (1894-1953)
- Industry: Railways
- Founded: 1894
- Defunct: 27 February 1953
- Successor: North Eastern Railway
- Headquarters: Cawnpore, United Provinces, India
- Area served: Northern India
- Services: Rail transport

Cawnpore–Barabanki Railway (C–B) (1943–1953) (earlier called Cawnpore–Burhwal Railway (1894–1943) was a railway in northern India. It was managed as part of the East Indian Railway, and was worked by the Bengal and North Western Railway and the Rohilkund and Kumaon Railway.

== History ==
Cawnpore–Burhwal Railway was sanctioned for construction in October 1894 to provide a link between the metre gauge railways, north of the Ganga river with the Rajputana-Malwa Railway system. The construction was commenced in November 1894. The line was constructed alongside the broad gauge from Cawnpore via Lucknow to a junction with Bengal and North Western Railway at Burhwal 160 km away. The metre gauge line between Burhwal and Daliganj on the Lucknow–Bareilly Railway was opened on 24 November 1896. The line was later extended to Barabanki. The line was 29 km long. The metre gauge Cawnpore-Aishbagh section of the Cawnpore–Burhwal Railway (metre gauge link) was opened for goods traffic on 25 April 1897. The line was 72 km long.

In Oudh and Rohilkhand railway and Cawnpore–Burhwal railway there were no curves of a shorter radius than 1,000 feet (300 m), except on the Cawnpore–Burhwal railway where the sharpest curve has a radius of 573 feet (175 m).

The Railway was essentially the common stem of the Bengal and North Western Railway and Rohilkund and Kumaon Railway networks. The Cawnpore–Burwhal Railway was renamed the Cawnpore–Barabanki Railway around 1943. The Cawnpore–Barabanki Railway was transferred to the North Eastern Railway on 27 February 1953.

== Conversion to broad gauge ==
The CBR was converted to 1,676 mm (5 ft 6 in) broad gauge in 2014.
