= Kanpur Anwarganj railway station =

Railway station in Uttar Pradesh, India

Coordinates: 26.455402°N 80.328925°E

Kanpur Anwarganj
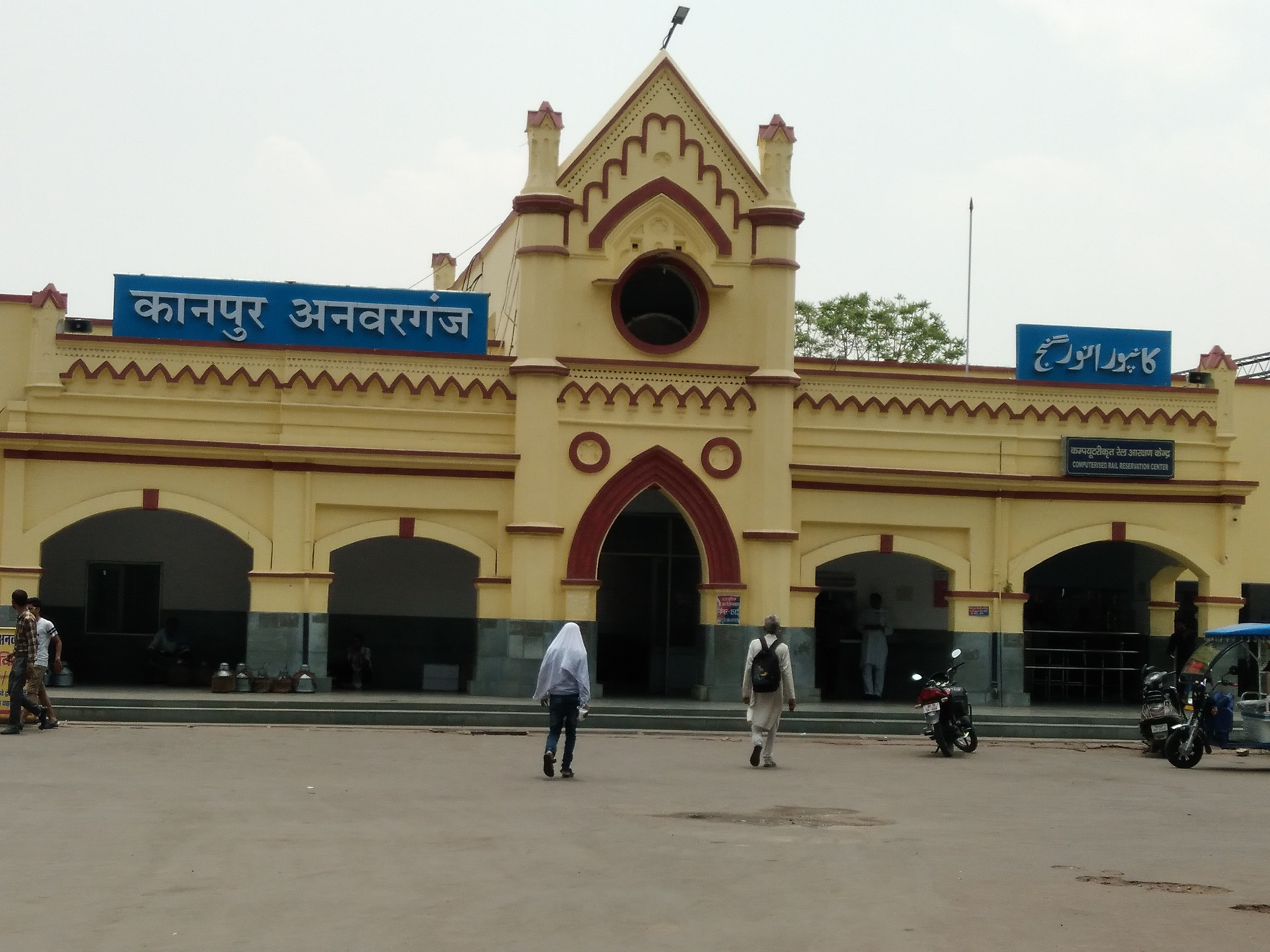

General information
- Location: NH 91, Anwarganj Station Lane, Kanpur, Kanpur Nagar district, Uttar Pradesh; India
- Elevation: 126 metres (413 ft)
- System: Indian Railways station
- Line: Kanpur–Mathura
- Platforms: 3
- Tracks: 5
- Connections: Taxi stand/Anwarganj station KMBS City Bus Stop

Construction
- Structure type: At grade
- Parking: Available

Other information
- Status: Functioning
- Station code: CPA
- Zone(s): North Central Railway
- Division(s): Allahabad

History
- Opened: 1896; 130 years ago
- Electrified: January 2009; 17 years ago
- Former names: Indian Branch Railway Company; Northern Railways

Passengers
- 50,000
Location

Kanpur Anwarganj is the second-largest railway station in Kanpur Nagar district, Uttar Pradesh, India.

== Structure and layout ==
It has three platforms. It was constructed during the British Raj. It has one big clock on its main building. It is on the Farrukhabad–Kanpur line. Until 2006 it was a metre-gauge station. In 2006 Railway Minister Lalu Prasad Yadav reopened the line as a broad-gauge railway line towards Lucknow. The first station superintendent was Mr. V.N. Pandey. In 2008 a broad-gauge line opened towards Mathura too.

== Services ==
Kanpur Anwarganj serves trains of Lucknow–Kanpur Suburban Railway to reduce pressure on Kanpur Central. Around 45 trains pass through the station. Some MEMU trains start from here. Kanpur Anwarganj is now linked with some new stations like New Delhi, Mathura, Agra, Jaipur, Gorakhpur, Chapra, Patna, Kolkata, etc. Now Kanpur Anwarganj is one of the main railway stations on the route to Rajasthan and Eastern India.

== Trains originating ==
Train number	Train name	Arrival	Departure	Destination/ Origin	Days	Platform no.
5003	Chauri Chaura Express	—	16:45	Gorakhpur	Daily	1
5004	Chauri Chaura Express	12:10	—	Gorakhpur Junction	Daily	1
8191	Utsarg Express	09:45	—	Chhapra	Daily	3
8192	Utsarg Express	—	16:25	Chhapra	Daily	3

== See also ==
- Kanpur Central
- Kanpur Bridge Left Bank
- Lucknow–Kanpur Suburban Railway
