= Farrukhabad Junction railway station =

Railway Station in Uttar Pradesh, India

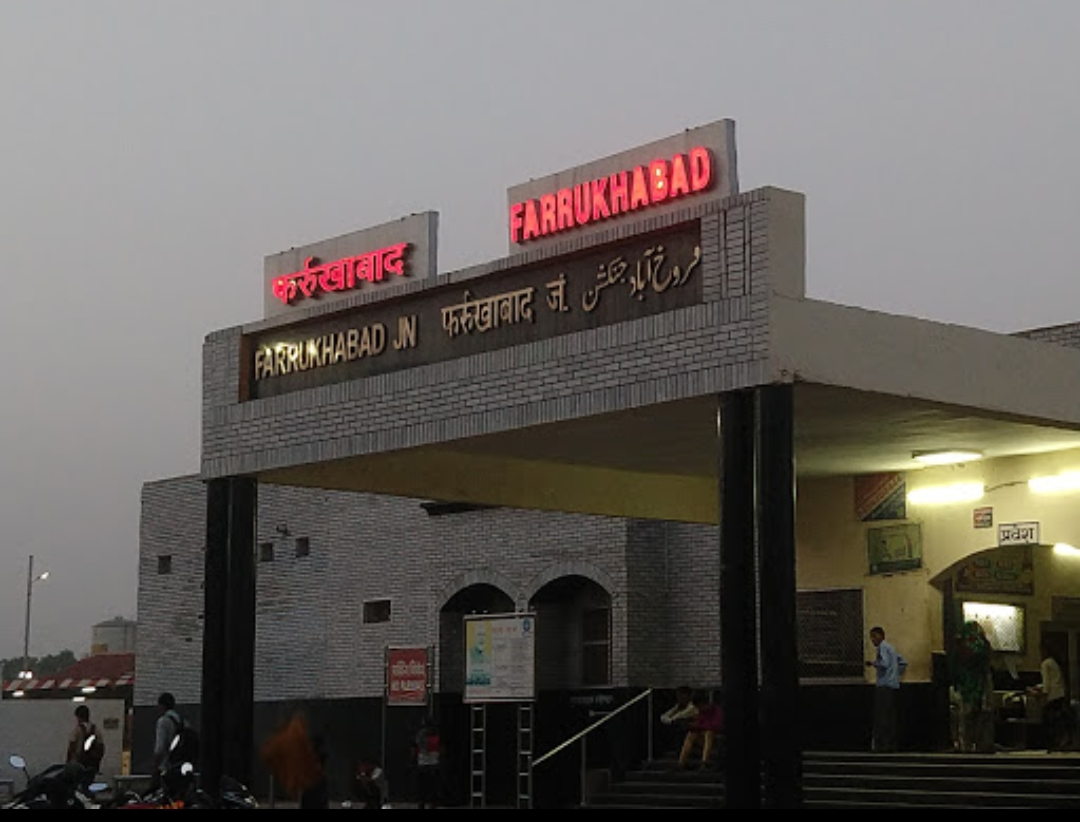
- Farrukhabad city station (FBD)

General information
- Location: Farrukhabad, Uttar Pradesh; India
- Coordinates: 27.3825°N 79.5715°E
- Elevation: 151 metres (495 ft)
- System: Indian Railways station
- Owner: Indian Railways
- Lines: Farrukhabad–Shikohabad line via Mainpuri, Farrukhabad–Kanpur line via Kannauj, Farrukhabad–Kasganj line
- Platforms: 5
- Tracks: 7 at station
- Connections: Auto stand

Construction
- Structure type: At grade
- Parking: Yes
- Cycle facilities: No

Other information
- Station code: FBD
- Zone(s): Northern Eastern Railway
- Division(s): Izzatnagar
- Fare zone: North Eastern Railway

History
- Electrified: Single electric line

Passengers
- 9000 approx daily footfalls
Location
- Location within India Location within Uttar Pradesh

Farrukhabad Junction railway station is a main railway station in Farrukhabad district, Uttar Pradesh. Its code is FBD. It serves Farrukhabad city. The station consists of 5 platforms.
