= Gorakhpur–Prayagraj Vande Bharat Express =

Mini Vande Bharat Express train route in India

Gorakhpur Jn - Prayagraj Jn Vande Bharat Express
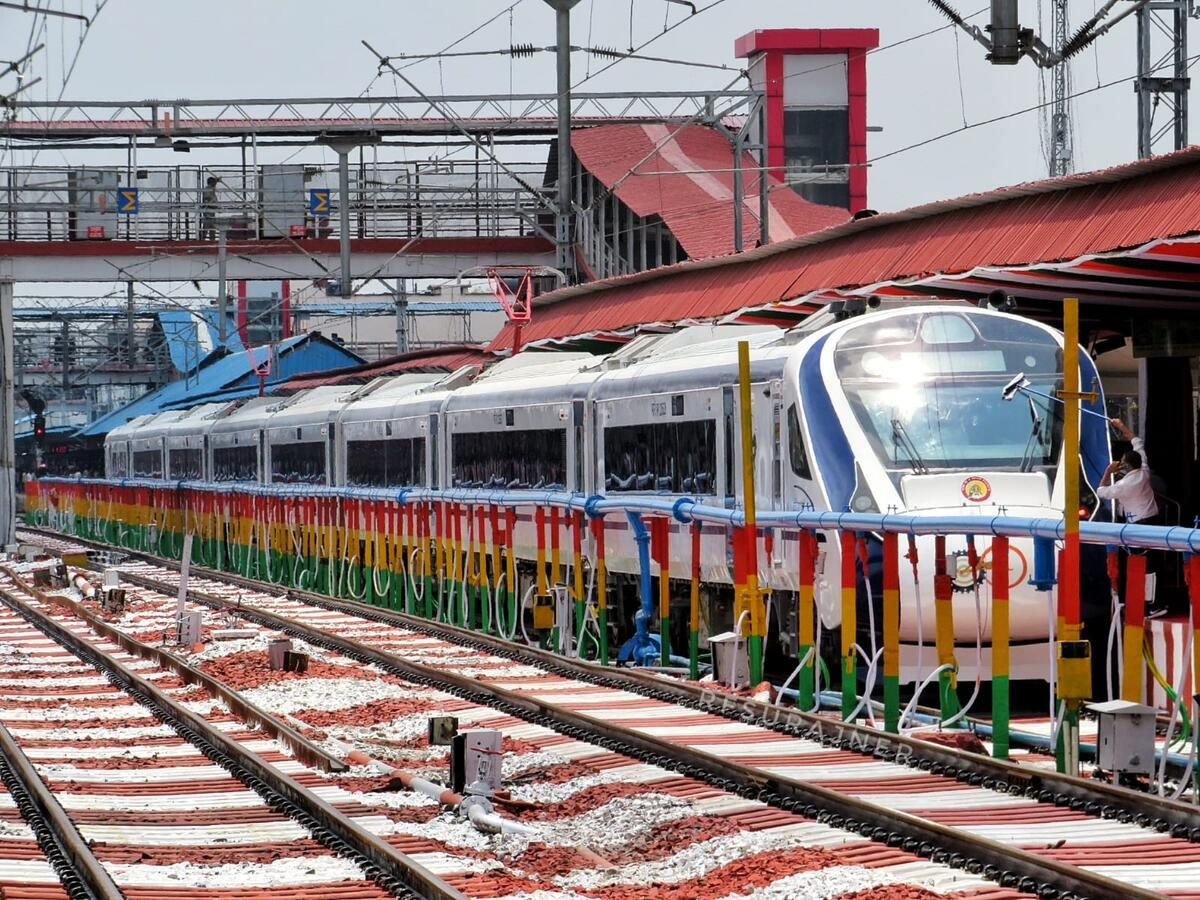
- This Mini Vande Bharat Express getting ready for inaugural run towards Prayagraj Junction

Overview
- Service type: Vande Bharat Express
- Locale: Uttar Pradesh
- First service: 7 July 2023 (Inaugural run); 9 July 2023; 3 years ago (Commercial run)
- Current operator: North Eastern Railways (NER)

Route
- Termini: Gorakhpur Junction (GKP); Prayagraj Junction (PRYJ)
- Stops: 4
- Distance travelled: 500 km (311 mi)
- Average journey time: 07 hrs 30 mins
- Service frequency: Six days a week (Note: Except Saturdays)
- Train number: 22549 / 22550
- Lines used: Gorakhpur–Lucknow line; Lucknow–Rae Bareli–Varansi line (till Rae Bareli Jn); Rae Bareli–Unchahar–Prayagraj line

On-board services
- Classes: AC Chair Car, AC Executive Chair Car
- Seating arrangements: Airline style; Rotatable seats
- Sleeping arrangements: No
- Catering facilities: On-board catering
- Observation facilities: Large windows in all coaches
- Entertainment facilities: On-board WiFi; Infotainment System; Electric outlets; Reading light; Seat Pockets; Bottle Holder; Tray Table
- Baggage facilities: Overhead racks
- Other facilities: Kavach

Technical
- Rolling stock: Vande Bharat 2.0
- Track gauge: Indian gauge 1,676 mm (5 ft 6 in) broad gauge
- Electrification: 25 kV 50 Hz AC Overhead line
- Operating speed: 110 km/h (68 mph) (Oper.)
- Average length: 384 metres (1,260 ft) (16 coaches)
- Track owner: Indian Railways
- Rake maintenance: Gorakhpur Jn (GKP)

The 22549/22550 Gorakhpur - Prayagraj Vande Bharat Express is India's 25th Vande Bharat Express train, connecting the city of Gorakhpur City via Ayodhya and terminating at the city of Prayagraj in Uttar Pradesh. This express train is a former of another service which terminated at state capital city Lucknow which was inaugurated by Prime Minister Narendra Modi on 7 July 2023.

This extension was inaugurated by Prime Minister Narendra Modi via video conferencing from Ahmedabad on March 12, 2024.

== Overview ==
This train is operated by Indian Railways, connecting Gorakhpur Jn, Basti, Ayodhya Dham Jn, Lucknow Charbagh, Rae Bareli Jn and Prayagraj Jn. It is operated with train numbers 22549/22550 on 6 days a week basis.

== Rakes ==
It is the twenty-third 2nd Generation Vande Bharat 2.0 which was designed and manufactured by the Integral Coach Factory at Perambur, Chennai under the Make in India Initiative.

== Service ==
The 22549/22550 Gorakhpur Jn - Prayagraj Jn Vande Bharat Express operates six days a week except Saturdays, covering a distance of 497 km (309 mi) in a travel time of 7 hours with an average speed of 66 km/h (41 mph). The service has 5 intermediate stops. The Maximum Permissible Speed is 130 km/h (81 mph).

== Incidents ==
After the inauguration ceremony of the newly launched Vande Bharat Express train between Gorakhpur and Lucknow, it met with a goat incident. This incident took place on 11 July 2023 when crossing Sohawal, about 15 km away from Ayodhya Cantt. Jn railway station, leading to damage of window panes at coaches C1, C3, C5 (Chair Car) and E1 (Executive Chair Car). No casualties were reported during that incident.

== See also ==
- Vande Bharat Express
- Gatimaan Express
- Tejas Express
- Gorakhpur Junction railway station
- Lucknow Charbagh railway station
- Prayagraj Junction railway station
