= Ayodhya Junction railway station =

Railway station in Uttar Pradesh, India

Ayodhya Junction
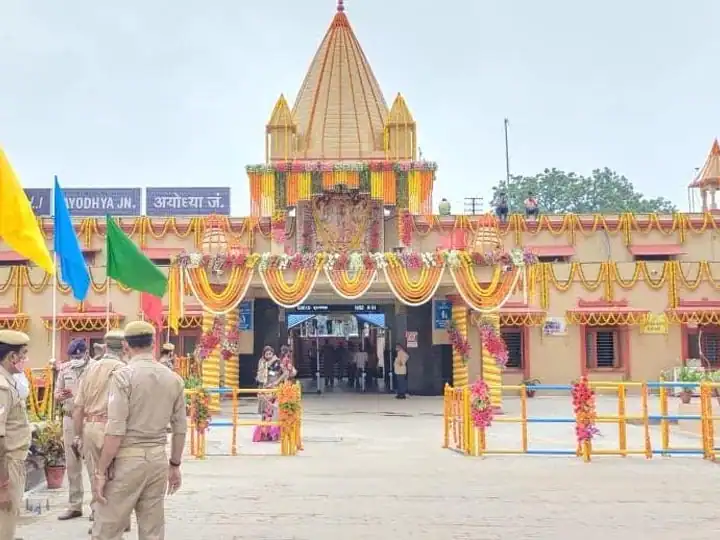
- Ayodhya Junction railway station

General information
- Other names: Ayodhya Dham Junction (official)
- Location: Dharmakata, Ayodhya, Uttar Pradesh, India
- Coordinates: 26.78777°N 82.20008°E
- System: Indian Railways station
- Owner: Ministry of Railways (India)
- Operator: Indian Railways
- Lines: Varanasi–Lucknow line Lucknow–Gorakhpur line
- Platforms: 3
- Tracks: 5
- Connections: Faizabad Bus Depot, Taxi Stand, Auto stand

Construction
- Structure type: At grade
- Parking: Available

Other information
- Status: Active
- Station code: AY
- Zone(s): Northern Railway
- Division(s): Lucknow NR
- Fare zone: Northern Railways

History
- Opened: 1874; 152 years ago
- Rebuilt: Under progress
- Computerized ticketing counters Luggage checking system Parking Disabled access Food plaza Kiosks WC Taxi stand Public transportation
Location
- Location within Uttar Pradesh Location within India
- Interactive map

Ayodhya Junction railway station, officially named as Ayodhya Dham Junction railway station, is a railway station in the city of Ayodhya in the state of Uttar Pradesh, India. It is located at Dharmakata, 1.5 km (0.93 mi) south-west from the city centre and 1.2 km (0.75 mi) south-east from Ram Mandir. It is one of two major railway stations in the twin city; the other one is Ayodhya Cantt..The station falls under the Northern Railway zone of the Indian Railways. The station's code is "AY".

== Location ==
The station is near to Ayodhya Cantonment on the Lucknow–Ayodhya–Varanasi line. Another line to Gorakhpur crosses the Saryu River to the north and then heads east from Mankapur Junction.

== Operations ==
The station was built by the British during the colonial era in 1874, as part of the Lucknow–Gorakhpur line. It is one of the oldest railway stations in India and is one of the most important and busiest stations in Uttar Pradesh. It lies under the Northern Railway zone of the Indian Railways. It is amongst the top hundred train ticket booking and train travelling stations of the Indian Railways. The total number of trains that pass through the station is 64. As of December 2023, it is a 'C' category station, based on long-distance trains running to and from the station in a week, with 46 trains. The Gorakhpur–Prayagraj Vande Bharat Express, Anand Vihar Terminal–Ayodhya Vande Bharat Express, Patna–Gomti Nagar (Lucknow) Vande Bharat Express and Meerut City–Varanasi Vande Bharat Express are some Vande Bharat Express trains that operate to and from the station. The first Amrit Bharat Express of India, the Darbhanga–Anand Vihar Terminal Amrit Bharat Express and other Amrit Bharat trains like Darbhanga-Gomti Nagar (Lucknow) Amrit Bharat Express, Dibrugarh - Gomti Nagar Amrit Bharat Express, Malda Town-Gomti Nagar (Lucknow) Amrit Bharat Express also runs with a stop at Ayodhya. In the future, as the station will expand, more operations will facilitate in the station, much more than what it is at present.

== Structure ==
The existing station building, covering an area of approximately 940 m^{2} (10,100 sq ft), has been renovated many times before reaching its present condition, since its establishment in 1874. It has all basic facilities and amenities, such as ticket and baggage counters, a waiting hall, a parking area for vehicles in its premises, restaurants, restrooms and is disabled-friendly with the facility of wheelchairs and ramps. The station has three platforms and five tracks, where the number of platforms will also be increased to five, as part the ongoing redevelopment project of the station. The platform no. 1 of the station has been extended to a length of 1.5 km, in order to handle more long-distance trains with more bogies. A new, larger station building has been constructed just west of the existing building to handle more capacity, as part of the station's redevelopment.

== Expansion ==
Due to rising traffic and congestion in the station, the existing station building will not be able to cope with the load in the near future any longer. To boost connectivity, accessibility and tourism in the state, in 2019, the station was considered to be redeveloped as a modern and advanced station by the Ministry of Railways and the Government of Uttar Pradesh, and the station was included in the Government of India's Station Redevelopment Scheme, whose name was later changed to Amrit Bharat Station Scheme in February 2023, an ambitious plan to redevelop all railway stations of India to make them ready for handling future demands. Since the laying of the foundation stone by Prime Minister Narendra Modi on 5 August 2020, the station has been undergoing expansion by adding double railway lines, alongside strengthening of electrification of the tracks to handle more high-capacity long-distance trains, construction of the new station building just beside to the existing building among many other facilities. The new design would retain the temple-like look of the existing station and would add new amenities besides increasing capacity to handle the greater passenger numbers expected due to the construction of the Ram Mandir in Ayodhya. The project is being overlooked by Rail India Technical and Economic Service (RITES). The railway station has been demarcated

=== New station building ===
The new station building has a built-up area of 100,000 sq ft (9,300 m^{2}), and measures 144 m in length, 44 m in width about 12 m in height. Its area is more than ten times the area of the existing building. It has increased the capacity of handling the number of passengers from 50,000-60,000 passengers to over 100,000 passengers daily. It has three floors–ground level, concourse level and mezzanine level. The station platforms, aprons as well as the entire circulating area are being revamped. A new four-lane approach road has been built that has connected the station with the nearby highway passing through the city as the bypass highway, along with the existing road from the city premises, for greater connectivity. The construction is being conducted in two phases, with a cost of ₹ 131.97 crore for the first phase and ₹ 307 crore for the second phase, thus taking the overall cost to around ₹430 crore (US$45 million). It is designed to portray the local culture and heritage of Ayodhya, and of Ram Mandir as the main inspiration. It has various designed structures and architecture depicting like what it is present in Hindu temples, such as Lord Ram's 'mukut' (crown), while the 'chakra' symbolizes the sun. Two shikaras on the roof take cues from the Janaki Mandir in Nepal, with seven mandapas nestled between the shikaras. Out of the three floors of the new building, the ground floor has an entrance passage, a central area for assembling of passengers before going to the platform areas, multiple passenger transit gates, ticket and baggage counters, a tourist information centre, lounges, washrooms, both AC and non-AC separate waiting rooms for gents and ladies, and one AC first-class waiting room. It also has one food plaza and four retail stores. The first floor will have both AC and non-AC general, first class, second class, and ladies waiting rooms, another food plaza and separate dormitories for men and women, out of which there is a men's dormitory with 17 beds and a women's dormitory with 10 beds. In total, 19 urinals and 20 lavatories have been developed as the washroom facilities. Outside the new building, a new, bigger parking area has been built, close to the existing building facing eastwards, in which there is a dedicated taxi booth also. To serve foreign tourists and high-ranking officials and professionals, there are VIP lounges and restrooms in both the ground and first floors of the new building.

Other passenger and disabled-friendly facilities and amenities include two escalators and lifts, ramps, wheelchair access and emergency services. It is a sustainable and eco-friendly building, as it uses entirely clean and renewable energy resources to generate electricity and other measures to protect the environment, such as solar panels on its roof for electricity, LED lights, abundant natural lighting provision through the roof, CCTV cameras, proper waste disposal measures, water management techniques like rainwater harvesting and a sewage treatment plant, and greenery in its premises for passenger facilitation. These green initiatives have earned the new building to get a Green Rating for Integrated Habitat Assessment (GRIHA) 3-star rating.

The first phase of the station's redevelopment project was expected to be completed by June 2021. However, due to the COVID-19 pandemic, which caused labour shortages and slowdowns in work, it got delayed, and the new station building was completed in 2022, while other works and interior works continued. The second phase encompasses the construction of a concourse above the tracks, which will be India's biggest concourse by area, covering 7,200 m^{2} (78,000 sq ft), whose design will be inspired by the petals of Lotus, the national flower of India, along with the addition of two new platforms, thereby increasing the total number of platforms to five, and a new station building in the southern side, which will be bigger than the new station building, and will also have a larger parking space. The first phase was fully completed and was inaugurated by Prime Minister Narendra Modi on 30 December 2023. The second phase began construction in December 2023 by starting first with the concourse, and will take around 2–3 years to complete.

== Transport ==
=== Road ===
The station has been made accessible from the city as well as from the NH-27 as Ayodhya Bypass Road, as part of its ongoing modernisation project.

=== Bus ===
The station is connected by bus to the Ayodhya Dham Bus Station, located 6 km (3.7 mi) east from it, and to the Faizabad Bus Depot, located 15 km (9.3 mi) west from Ayodhya.

=== Air ===
The nearest airport from the station is Maharishi Valmiki International Airport, located 10 km (6.2 mi) south-west from it.

== Gallery ==
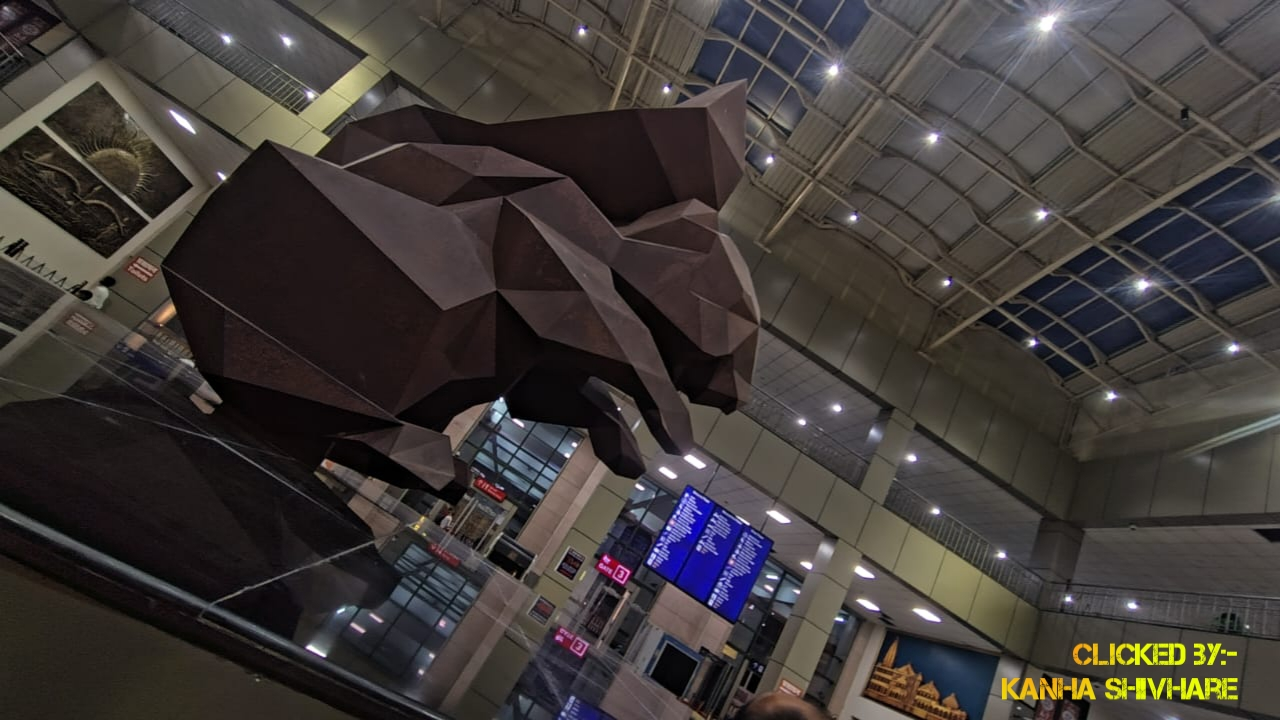
The Squirrel Monument at Ayodhya Dham Junction — a tribute to devotion, humility, and the timeless story from the Ramayana

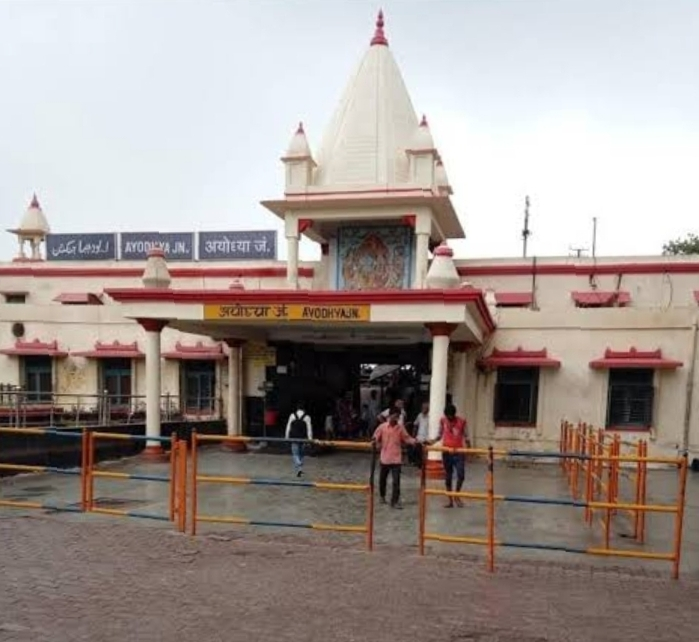
The station building in 2021, before modernisation.

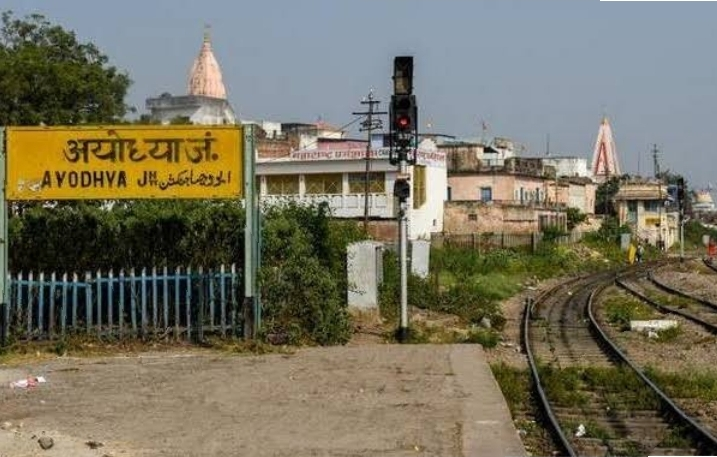
The platform area before modernisation.

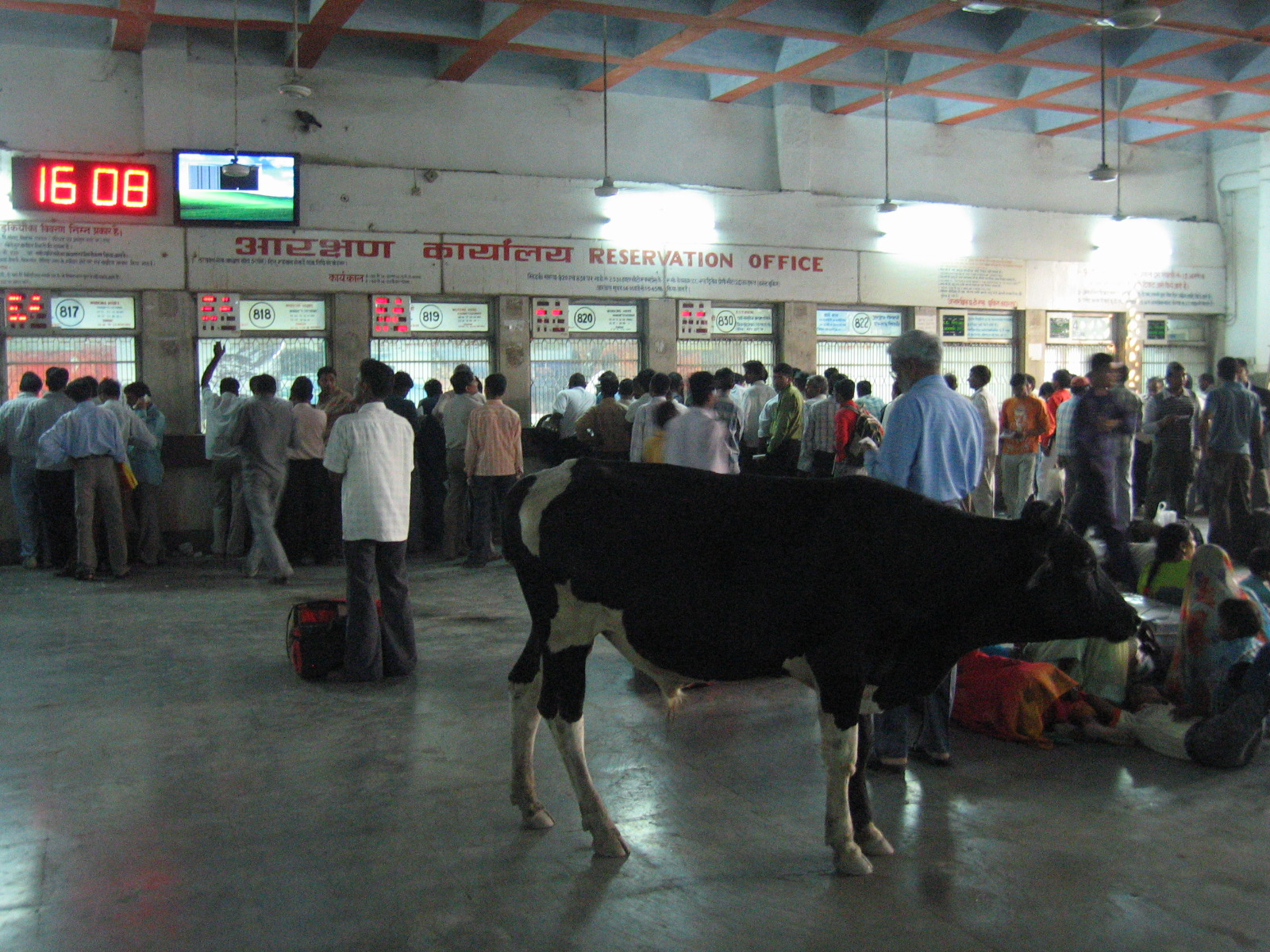
Ticket counters in the old station building before modernisation.

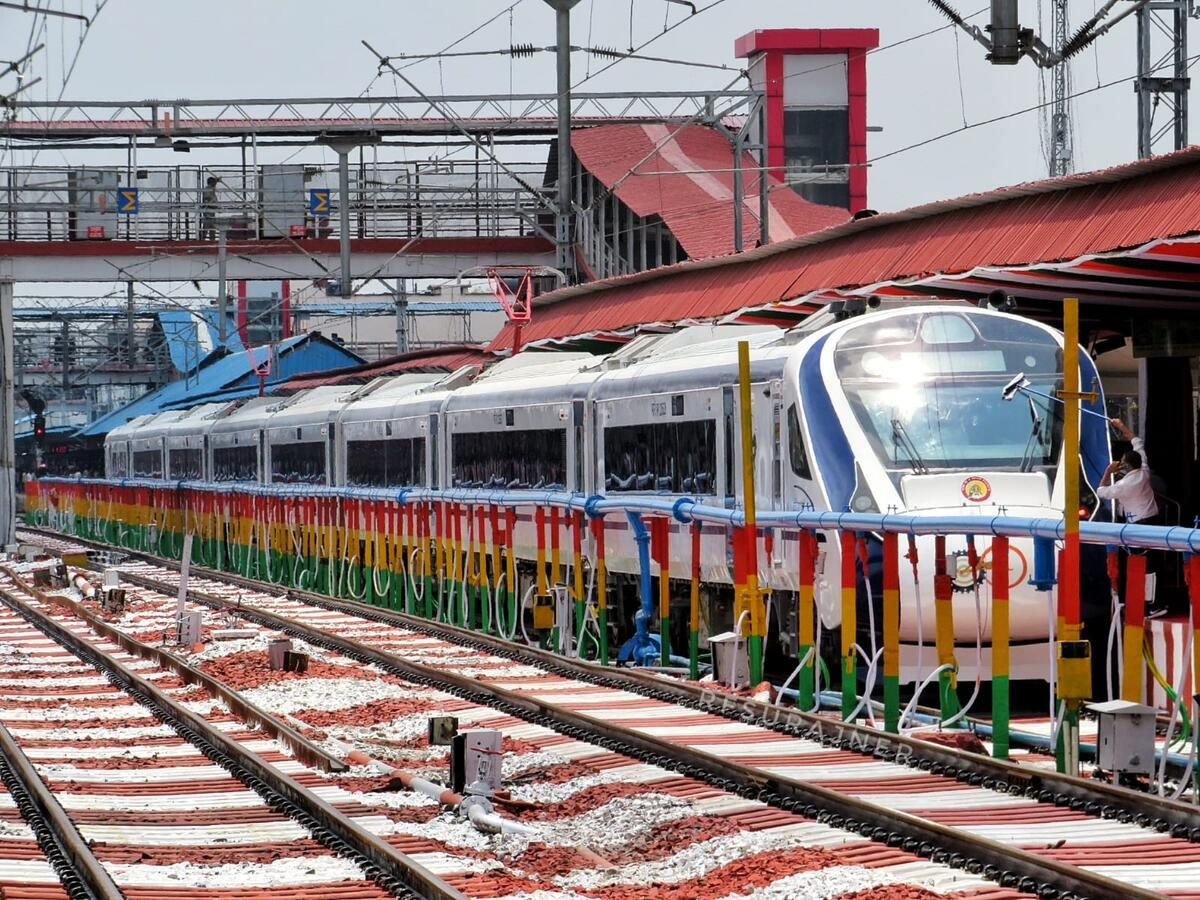
Gorakhpur–Lucknow Charbagh Vande Bharat Express is one of the two Vande Bharat Express trains that runs with a stop at Ayodhya.

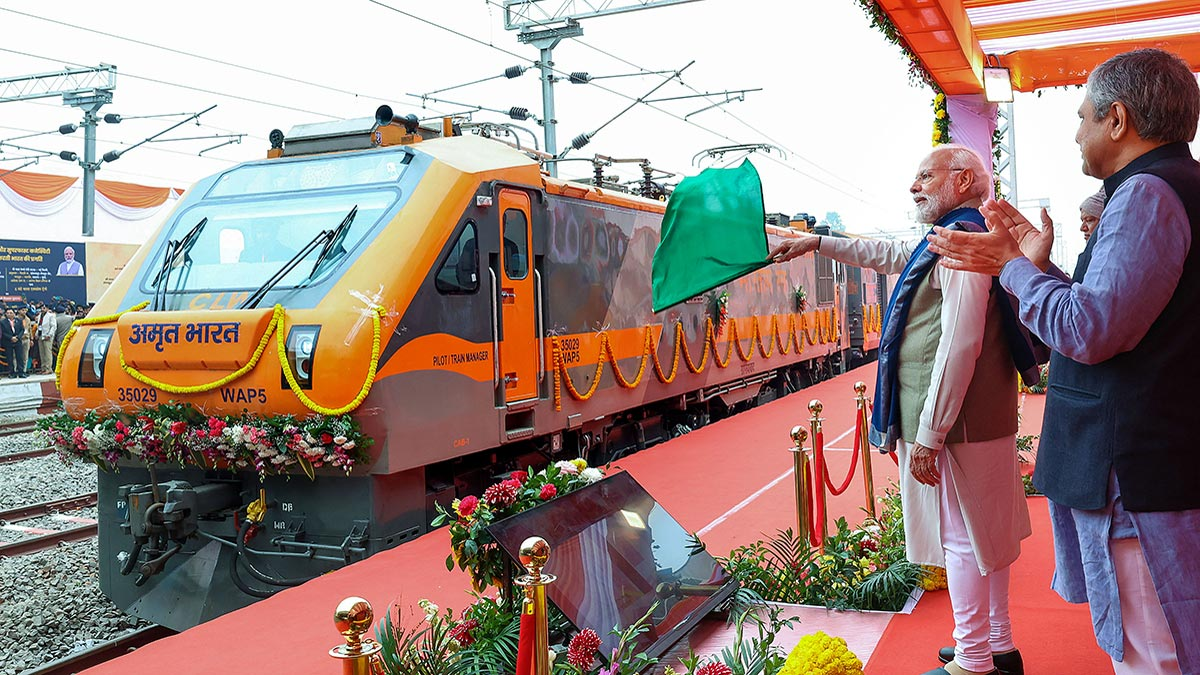
Prime Minister Narendra Modi flagging off the first Amrit Bharat Express train, the Darbhanga–Anand Vihar Terminal Amrit Bharat Express, in the presence of the Minister of Railways, Ashwini Vaishnaw, from the new station building of Ayodhya, on 30 December 2023.

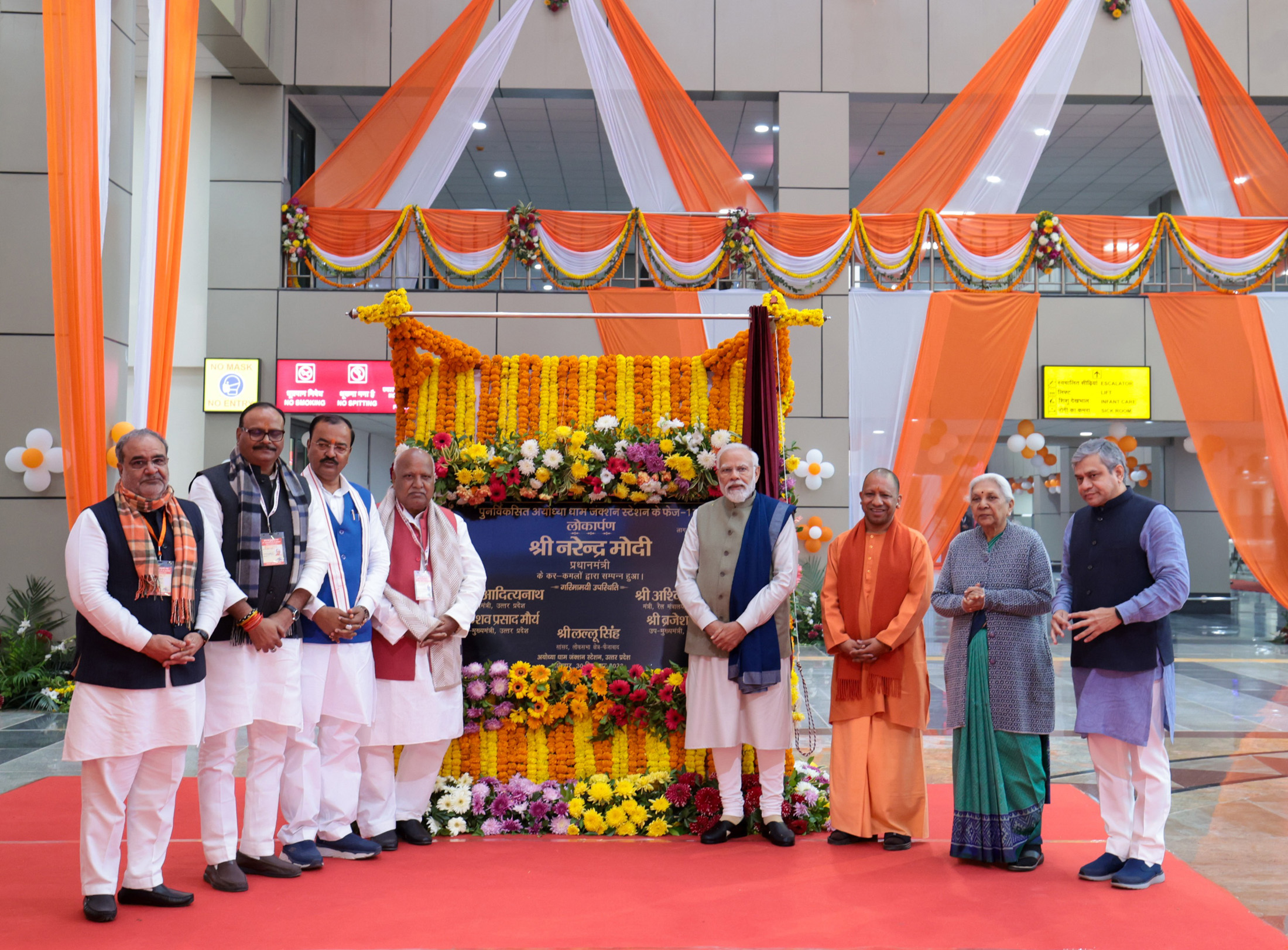
Prime Minister Narendra Modi, along with the Chief Minister of Uttar Pradesh, Yogi Adityanath, the Minister of Railways, Ashwini Vaishnaw, and other Uttar Pradesh cabinet ministers, at the inauguration ceremony of the first phase of the redevelopment of the station, on 30 December 2023.

== See also ==
- Lucknow–Gorakhpur line
- Varanasi–Lucknow line
- Lucknow Charbagh railway station
- Kanpur Central
- Ayodhya Airport
- Jaunpur Junction
- Ram Mandir
