= Meerut City–Varanasi Vande Bharat Express =

Mini Vande Bharat Express train route in India

Meerut City Jn – Varanasi Jn Vande Bharat Express
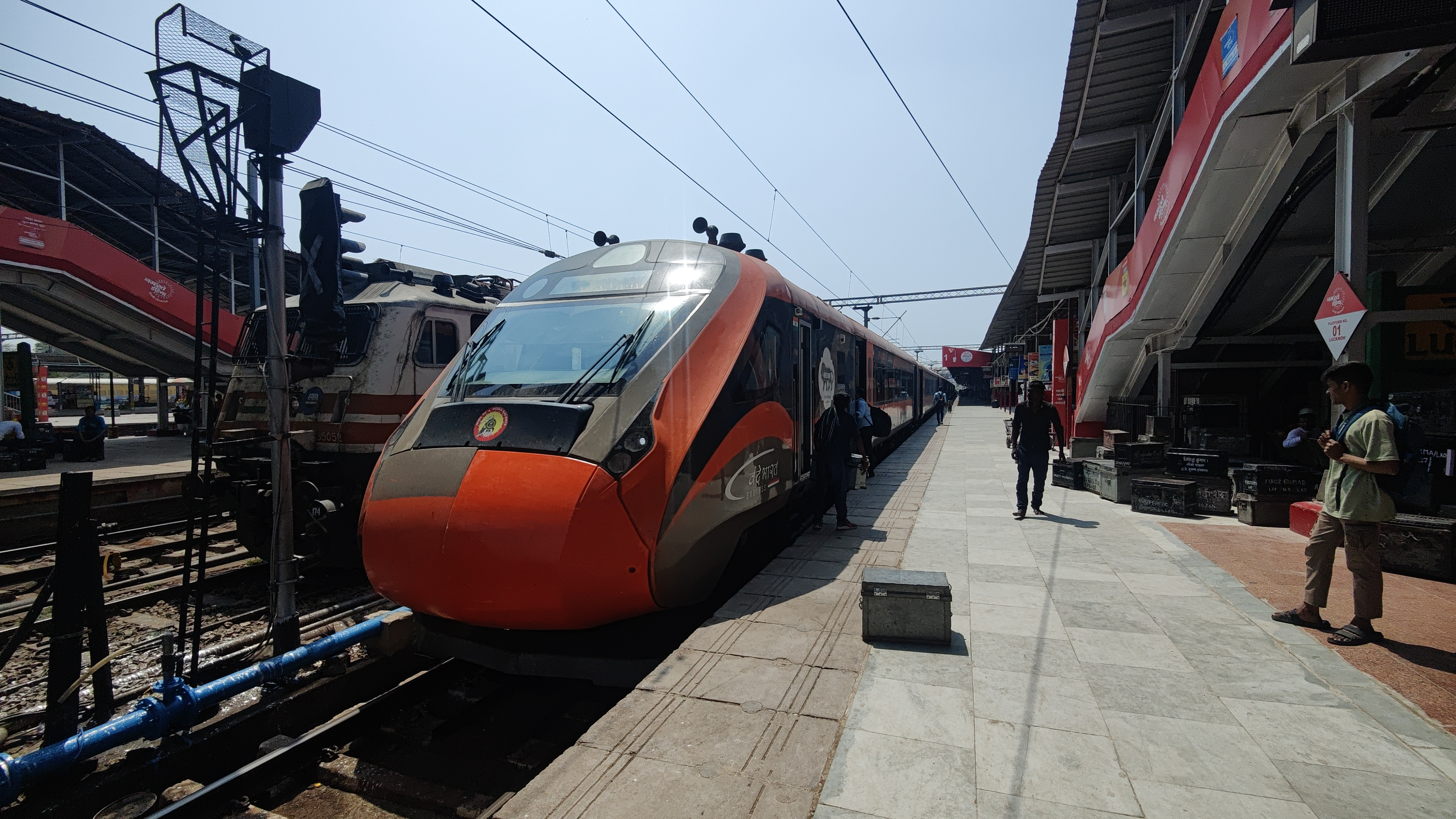
- This Mini Vande Bharat Express on standby at Meerut City Junction

Overview
- Service type: Vande Bharat Express
- Locale: Uttar Pradesh
- First service: August 31, 2024 (Inaugural); September 02 2024; 2 years ago (Commercial); August 27, 2025 (extension)
- Current operator: Northern Railways (NR)

Route
- Termini: Meerut City Junction (MTC); Varanasi Junction (BSB)
- Stops: 5
- Distance travelled: 782 km (486 mi)
- Average journey time: 11 hrs 55 mins
- Service frequency: Six days a week (Note: Except Tuesdays)
- Train number: 22490 / 22489
- Lines used: Varanasi-Lucknow line; Lucknow–Moradabad line; Moradabad–Delhi line (till Hapur Junction); Hapur–Meerut City line

On-board services
- Classes: AC Chair Car, AC Executive Chair Car
- Seating arrangements: Airline style; Rotatable seats
- Sleeping arrangements: No
- Catering facilities: On board Catering (TBC)
- Observation facilities: Large windows in all coaches
- Entertainment facilities: On-board WiFi; Infotainment System; Electric outlets; Reading light; Seat Pockets; Bottle Holder; Tray Table
- Baggage facilities: Overhead racks
- Other facilities: Kavach

Technical
- Rolling stock: Mini Vande Bharat 2.0
- Track gauge: Indian gauge 1,676 mm (5 ft 6 in) broad gauge
- Electrification: 25 kV 50 Hz AC Overhead line
- Operating speed: 64 km/h (40 mph) (Avg.)
- Average length: 192 metres (630 ft) (08 coaches)
- Track owner: Indian Railways
- Rake maintenance: Meerut City Junction (MTC)

The 22490/22489 Meerut City - Varanasi Jn Vande Bharat Express is India's 54th and 2nd longest route Vande Bharat Express train in India, connecting the capital of the kingdom of Mayasura, Meerut with the cultural and spiritual city, Varanasi in Uttar Pradesh. Initially it was started between Meerut City and Lucknow.

This express train was inaugurated on 31 August 2024 by Prime Minister Narendra Modi via video conferencing from New Delhi. On 27 August 2025, this train extended upto Varanasi Jn.

== Overview ==
This express train is operated by Indian Railways, connecting Meerut City Jn, Hapur Jn, Moradabad Jn, Bareilly Jn, Lucknow Charbagh, Ayodhya Dham Jn and Varanasi Jn. It is currently operated with train numbers 22490/22489 on 6 days a week basis.

== Rakes ==
It is the fifty-second 2nd Generation and thirty-sixth Mini Vande Bharat 2.0 Express train which was designed and manufactured by the Integral Coach Factory at Perambur, Chennai under the Make in India Initiative.

== Service ==
The 22490/22489 Meerut City - Varanasi Vande Bharat Express currently 6 days a week, covering a distance of 782 km (486 mi) in a travel time of 11 hrs 55 mins with average speed of 64 km/h. The Maximum Permissible Speed (MPS) will be 110 km/h.

== Route & Halts ==
Route and Schedule of 22489/22490 Varanasi-Meerut City Vande Bharat Express
Station	22489 Varanasi → Meerut City			22490 Meerut City → Varanasi		
Station	Arrival	Departure	Halt	Arrival	Departure	Halt
Varanasi Junction	—	09:10	—	18:25	—	—
Ayodhya Dham Junction	11:40	11:42	2m	15:53	15:55	2m
Lucknow Charbagh	13:40	13:50	10m	13:45	13:55	10m
Bareilly Junction	17:13	17:15	2m	10:04	10:06	2m
Moradabad Junction	18:50	18:55	5m	08:35	08:40	5m
Hapur Junction	20:10	20:12	2m	07:08	07:10	2m
Meerut City Junction	21:05	—	—	—	06:35	—

== See also ==
- Vande Bharat Express
- Tejas Express
- Gatimaan Express
- Meerut City Junction railway station
- Varanasi Junction railway station
