= Train warning system =

Train warning system may refer to:

- a train protection system
- Train Warning System (India)

== See also ==
- European Rail Traffic Management System
- Communications-based train control
- Train Protection & Warning System
