= Anti-collision device =

Indian automatic train protection device

The anti-collision device (ACD) is a form of automatic train protection used on Indian Railways.

== Overview ==
The ACD Network is a train-collision prevention system invented by Rajaram Bojji and patented by Konkan Railway Corporation, a public-sector undertaking of the Ministry of Railways, government of India.

Anti-collision devices were found to be effective in the Southern Railway zone after a brief trial.

== Level crossings ==
When Loco ACDs receive 'Gate Open' transmissions from Gate ACDs provided at non-interlocked level crossings, they brake to decelerate to 30 km/h or an alternative predetermined speed. Gate ACDs at staffed and unstaffed level crossings also warn passengers with the message 'Train Approach'.

If a Loco ACD receives a manual 'SOS' message from other train bound ACDs or a station ACD that is within three kilometres of its radial range, it applies brakes automatically to bring the train to a stop.

The application of this anti-collision device has been refined to not only prevent midsection collisions but also to prevent their occurrences in station yards. The newly engineered solution is integrated with the signalling systems, interlocking to react appropriately in case collision-like conditions are perceived at the time of reception and dispatch of trains from a station (e.g. while approaching a station). Loco ACDs also give 'Station Approach' alerts to train operators and regulate train speed when they receives information from Station ACDs.

== Future ==
Indian Railways have successfully piloted ACDs in the northeast frontier railway, covering 1,736 kilometres (1,079 mi) of its broad gauge route. They are now installing the ACDs on 760 kilometres (470 mi) of the Konkan Railway.

The on-board train protection device, the first device designed by Konkan Railway with their technical partner Kernex Microsystems (I) Ltd, was installed throughout the Indian Railway network.

A new ACD Version-II, now called the Train Collision Avoidance System (TCAS), is under development by The Research Designs and Standards Organisation (RDSO). Unlike ACD, which is more of a distributed system which acts independently, the TCAS will be more of a centralized system where TCAS controls communication between trains and with trains with the TDMA protocol. The TCAS under development is meant to be a vital safety system. TCAS has a deep coupling with the railway signalling system so ACD systems do not depend on the railway signalling system.

== ACD deficiencies ==
The ACD system is based on GPS based positioning and track detection. This has inherent problems as with GPS service and course acquisition, the best possible horizontal accuracy is 10 m. This is inadequate for detection of rail tracks separated by a distance of 10–15 feet (3.0–4.6 m). ACD does not even have DGPS, differential GPS that gives an accuracy close to 2.5 m, and hence had errors in track detection using their patented Deviation Count Theory that worked in block sections but failed in station sections. The result was erratic braking that disrupted train movements and proved to be ineffective.

The Railway Collision Avoidance System was patented in 2001 by an Indian inventor, Indranil Majumdar from Calcutta. He was awarded the Texas Instruments Analog Design Challenge 2001 for this design and another patent was granted in 2007.

After seven or eight years of problems with the ACD system, RDSO, Lucknow drafted the Train Collision Avoidance System (TCAS) specifications with amendments. In 2012, the Ver3.1.1 specification was released after joint consultation with companies manufacturing signaling equipment for the Indian Railways. The ACD system used in Indian Railways has inherent problems in station sections due to their design, using GPS for unfeasible track detection.

The High-Level Safety Review Committee at Mumbai on 12–13 January 2012 at the Western Railway HQ was skeptical of ACD effectiveness. They unanimously chose to develop TCAS as an open architecture system without charging royalties unlike the ACD which is proprietary.

The Indian government selected TCAS for future installation at a cost of 10 L INR per kilometre.

== See also ==
- Kavach
- Train Warning System
