= Darbhanga–Gomti Nagar (Lucknow) Amrit Bharat Express =

Amrit Bharat Express train route in India

Darbhanga – Gomti Nagar (Lucknow) Amrit Bharat Express
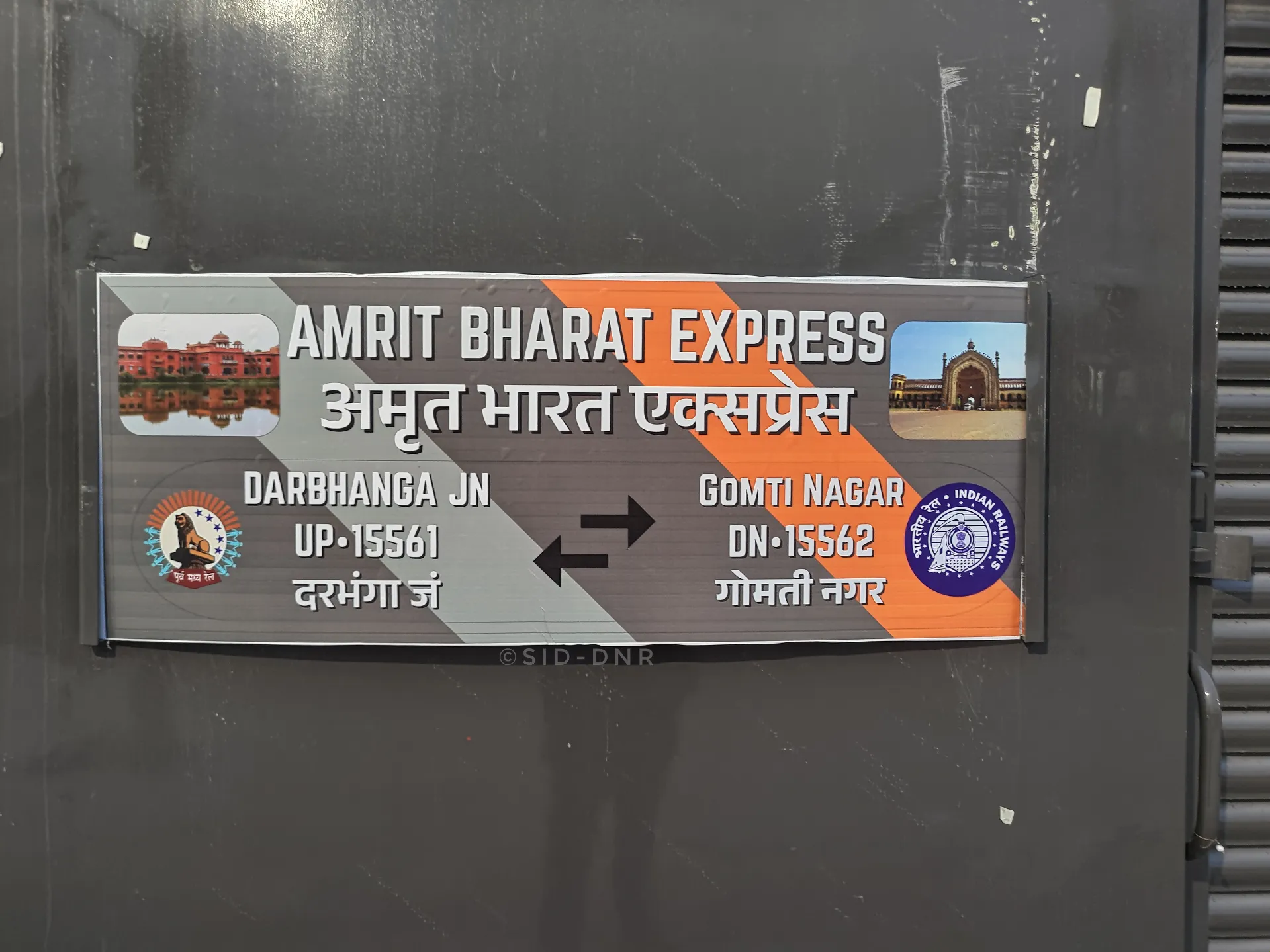

Overview
- Service type: Amrit Bharat Express, Superfast Express Train
- Locale: Bihar and Uttar Pradesh
- First service: 18 July 2025 (Inaugural); 26 July 2025; 13 months ago (Commercial)
- Current operator: East Central Railways (ECR)

Route
- Termini: Darbhanga Junction (DBG); Gomti Nagar (GTNR)
- Stops: 18
- Distance travelled: 629 km (391 mi)
- Average journey time: 14h 30m
- Service frequency: Weekly (Note: 15561 – Saturdays | 15562 – Sundays')
- Train number: 15561 / 15562
- Lines used: Darbhanga–Narkatiaganj line; Narkatiaganj–Kaptanganj–Gorakhpur line; Gorakhpur–Mankapur line; Ayodhya Dham–Ayodhya Cantt–Gomti Nagar

On-board services
- Class: Sleeper class coach (SL) General unreserved coach (GS)
- Seating arrangements: Yes (08 coaches)
- Sleeping arrangements: Yes (12 coaches)
- Observation facilities: Saffron-grey livery
- Entertainment facilities: Electric outlets; Reading lights; Bottle holder
- Other facilities: CCTV cameras; Bio-vacuum toilets; Foot-operated water taps; Passenger information system

Technical
- Rolling stock: Modified LHB coaches
- Track gauge: Indian gauge
- Electrification: 25 kV 50 Hz AC overhead line
- Operating speed: 43 km/h (27 mph) (Avg.)
- Average length: 23.54 m (77.2 ft) (each) and 22 coaches
- Track owner: Indian Railways
- Rake maintenance: Darbhanga Jn (DBG)
- Rake sharing: Darbhanga–Anand Vihar Terminal Amrit Bharat Express

The 15561/15562 Darbhanga–Gomti Nagar (Lucknow) Amrit Bharat Express is India's 5th Non-AC Superfast Amrit Bharat Express train, which currently runs across the states of Bihar and Uttar Pradesh by connecting the municipal corporation city Darbhanga with the capital city of Uttar Pradesh, Lucknow in India.

This express train was inaugurated on 18 July 2025 by Prime Minister Narendra Modi.

== Overview ==
This train currently operated by Indian Railways, connecting Darbhanga Junction and Gomti Nagar. It is currently operated with train numbers 15561/15562 on Weekly services.

== Rakes ==
It is the 3rd Amrit Bharat 2.0 Express train in which the locomotives were designed by Chittaranjan Locomotive Works (CLW) at Chittaranjan, West Bengal and the coaches were designed and manufactured by the Integral Coach Factory at Perambur, Chennai under the Make in India initiative.

== Service ==
The 15561/15562 Darbhanga – Gomti Nagar Amrit Bharat Express currently operates Weekly, covering a distance of 629 km (391 mi) in a travel time of 14hrs 35mins with average speed of 54 km/h. The Maximum Permissible Speed (MPS) is 130 km/h (81 mph).

== Routes and halts ==
The halts for this 15561/15562 Darbhanga – Gomti Nagar (Lucknow) Amrit Bharat Express are given below:-

1. Darbhanga Junction
2. Kamtaul
3. Janakpur Road
4. Sitamarhi Junction
5. Bairgania
6. Ghorasahan
7. Raxaul Junction
8. Sikta
9. Narkatiaganj Junction
10. Harinagar
11. Bagaha
12. Kaptanganj Junction
13. Gorakhpur Junction
14. Basti
15. Mankapur Junction
16. Ayodhya Dham Junction
17. Ayodhya Cantt Junction
18. Gomti Nagar

== Rake sharing ==
The train shares its rakes with 15557/58 Darbhanga–Anand Vihar Terminal Amrit Bharat Express.

== See also ==
- Amrit Bharat Express
- Darbhanga–Anand Vihar Terminal Amrit Bharat Express
- Vande Bharat Express
- Tejas Express
- Gatimaan Express
- Darbhanga Junction railway station
- Gomti Nagar railway station
