= Darbhanga–Anand Vihar Terminal Amrit Bharat Express =

Amrit Bharat train route in India

Darbhanga - Anand Vihar Terminal Amrit Bharat SF Express
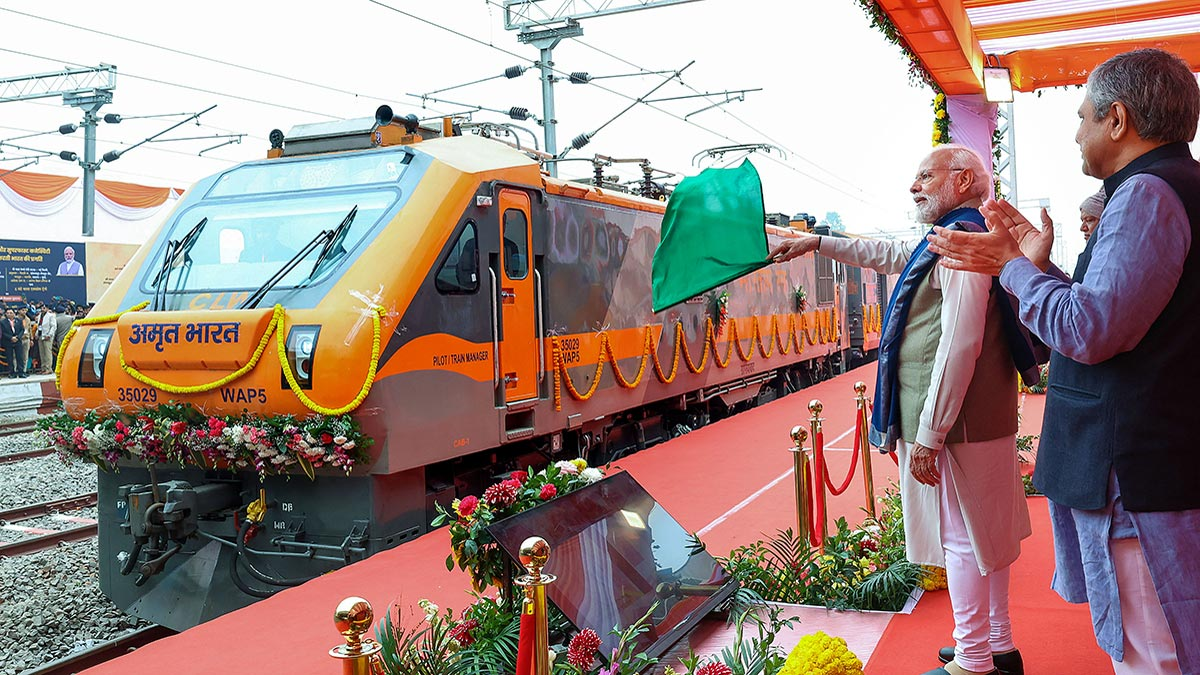
- Prime Minister Narendra Modi flagging off this first Amrit Bharat Express train, in the presence of Minister of Railways, Ashwini Vaishnaw, from Ayodhya's new station building, on 30 December 2023.

Overview
- Service type: Superfast
- Status: Operating (Active)
- Locale: Bihar, Uttar Pradesh and New Delhi
- First service: 30 December 2023 (Inaugural); 1 January 2024; 2 years ago (Commercial)
- Current operator: East Central Railways (ECR)
- Ridership: Average weekly

Route
- Termini: Darbhanga Junction (DBG); Anand Vihar Terminal (ANVT)
- Stops: 18
- Distance travelled: 1,137 km (706 mi)
- Average journey time: 21 hrs 35 mins
- Service frequency: Bi-Weekly services (Note: 15557 - Mondays and Thursdays | 15558 - Tuesdays and Fridays)
- Train number: 15557/15558
- Lines used: Darbhanga–Sitamarhi line; Raxaul–Narkatiaganj–Kaptanganj line; Gorakhpur–Ayodhya Dham–Lucknow Charbagh line; Kanpur–Anand Vihar Terminal line

On-board services
- Class: Sleeper Class Coach (SL) General Unreserved Coach (GS)
- Seating arrangements: Yes (08 Coaches)
- Sleeping arrangements: Yes (12 Coaches)
- Auto-rack arrangements: Upper
- Catering facilities: On-board Catering - Yes
- Observation facilities: Saffron-Grey
- Entertainment facilities: Electric Outlets; Reading lights; Bottle Holder
- Other facilities: CCTV cameras; Bio-Vacuum Toilets; Foot-Operated Water Taps; Passenger information system

Technical
- Rolling stock: Modified LHB Coaches
- Track gauge: Indian gauge 1,676 mm (5 ft 6 in) broad gauge
- Electrification: 25 kV 50 Hz AC Overhead line
- Operating speed: 53 km (33 mi) (Avg.)
- Average length: 23.54 m (77.2 ft) (each) and 22 coaches
- Track owner: Indian Railways
- Rake maintenance: Darbhanga Jn (DBG)
- Rake sharing: Darbhanga–Gomti Nagar (Lucknow) Amrit Bharat Express

The 15557/15558 Darbhanga - Anand Vihar Terminal Amrit Bharat Superfast Express is India's 1st Non-AC Amrit Bharat Superfast Express train, which runs across the states of Bihar, Uttar Pradesh and New Delhi connecting the cities of Darbhanga and New Delhi's Anand Vihar Terminal via Raxaul, Sitamarhi, Gorakhpur, Lucknow, and Kanpur.

This express train was inaugurated on 30 December 2023 by Prime Minister Narendra Modi from Ayodhya Dham Junction.

== Overview ==
This train is operated by Indian Railways, connecting Darbhanga Jn and Anand Vihar Terminal. It is currently operated with train numbers 15557/15558 on Bi-Weekly services.

== Rakes ==
It is the first Amrit Bharat Express train in which the locomotives were designed by Chittaranjan Locomotive Works (CLW) at Chittaranjan, West Bengal and the coaches were designed and manufactured by the Integral Coach Factory at Perambur, Chennai under the Make in India Initiative.

== Service ==
The 15557/15558 Darbhanga - Anand Vihar Terminal Amrit Bharat Express currently operates 2 days a week, covering a distance of 1,137 km (706 mi) in a travel time of 21 hrs 35 mins with an average speed of 53 km/h (33 mph). The Maximum Permissible Speed (MPS) is 130 km/h (81 mph).

== Train halts ==
The halts for this 15557/15558 Darbhanga - Anand Vihar Terminal Amrit Bharat Express are as follows:-

1. Darbhanga Junction
2. Kamtaul
3. Janakpur Road
4. Sitamarhi Junction
5. Bairgania
6. Ghorasahan
7. Raxaul Junction
8. Narkatiaganj Junction
9. Bagaha
10. Kaptanganj Junction
11. Gorakhpur Junction
12. Basti
13. Mankapur Junction
14. Ayodhya Junction
15. Lucknow Charbagh
16. Kanpur Central
17. Etawah Junction
18. Tundla Junction
19. Aligarh Junction
20. Anand Vihar Terminal

== Rake sharing ==
The train shares its rakes with 15561/62 Darbhanga–Gomti Nagar (Lucknow) Amrit Bharat Express.

== See also ==
- Amrit Bharat Express
- Vande Bharat Express
- Tejas Express
- Gatimaan Express
- Darbhanga Junction railway station
- Anand Vihar Terminal railway station
