= Automatic train protection =

System installed in trains to prevent collisions through driver error

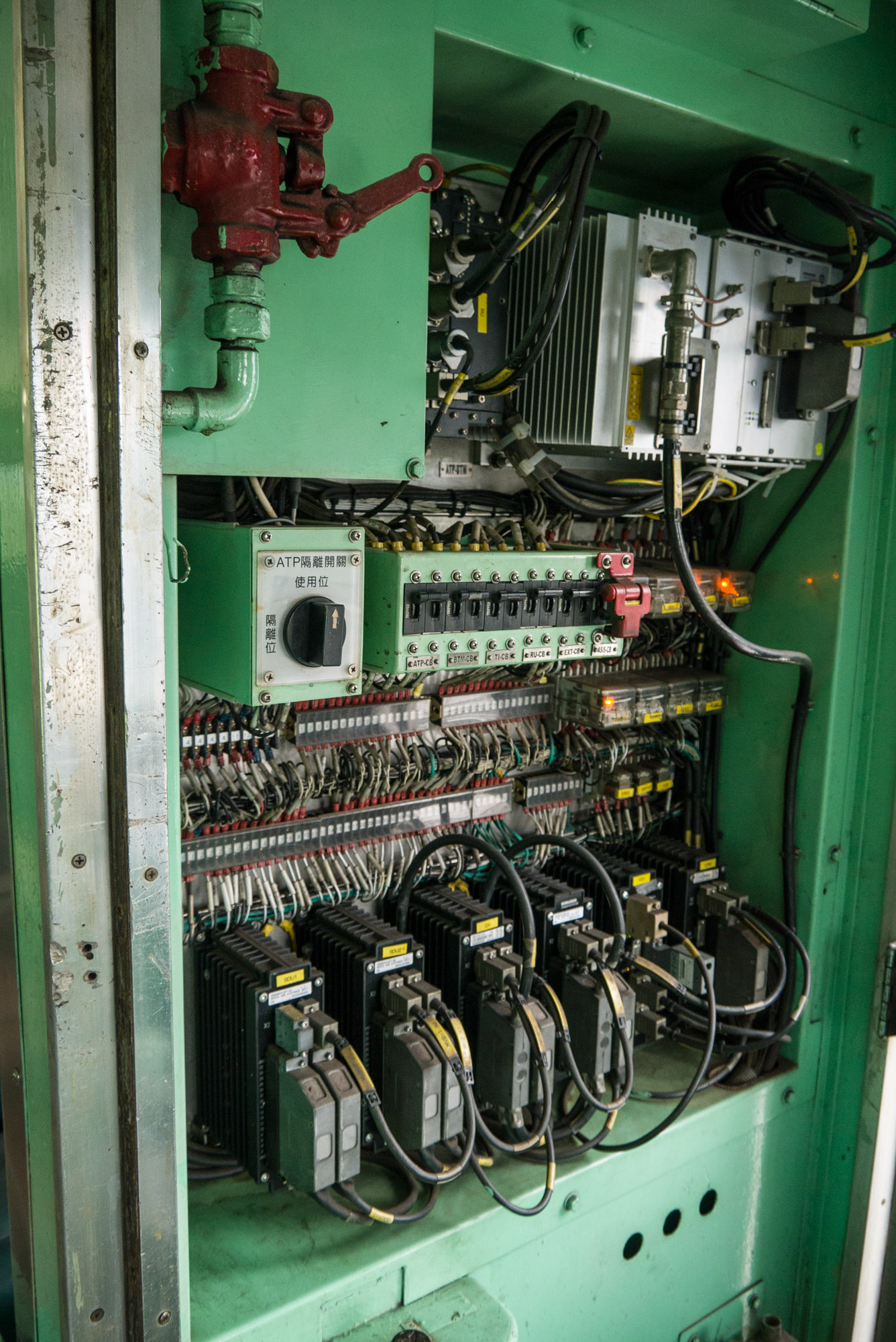
ATP switchboard in a Taiwan Railways Administration DR2700 series carriage

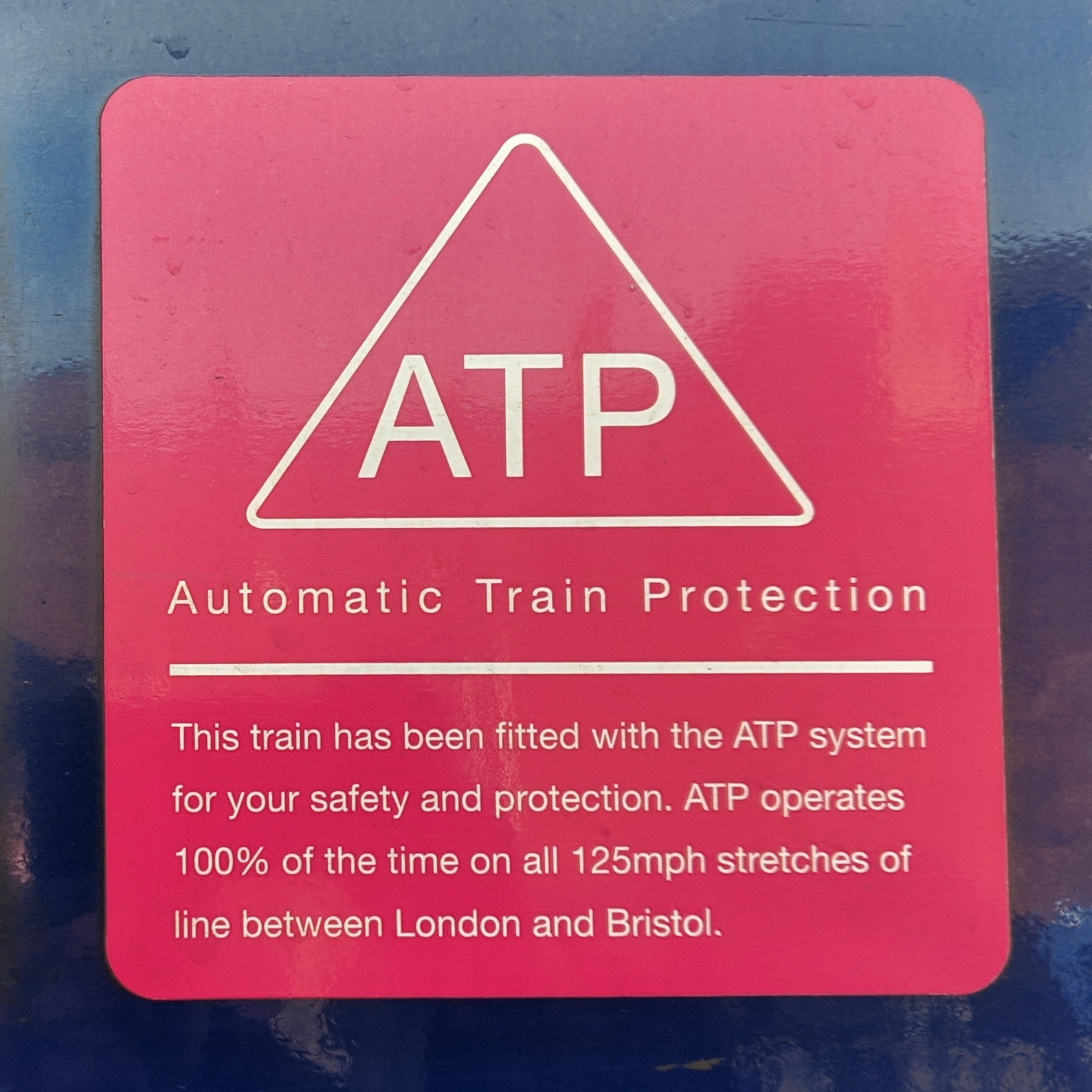
Automatic Train Protection notice on a First Great Western InterCity 125

Automatic train protection (ATP) is the generic term for train protection systems that continually check that the speed of a train is compatible with the permitted speed allowed by signalling, including automatic stop at certain signal aspects. If it is not, ATP activates an emergency brake to stop the train.

== See also ==
- Advanced Civil Speed Enforcement System
- Anti Collision Device
- Automatic Warning System
- Automatische treinbeïnvloeding (ATB)
- Automatic train control
- British Rail's ATP system
- Continuous Automatic Warning System (CAWS)
- EBICAB
- European Train Control System (ETCS)
- Kavach
- Positive Train Control (PTC)
- Punktförmige Zugbeeinflussung (PZB)
- Train Protection & Warning System
- Train Warning System
- Transmission Voie-Machine (TVM)
