= Kavach (train protection system) =

Indian railway safety technology

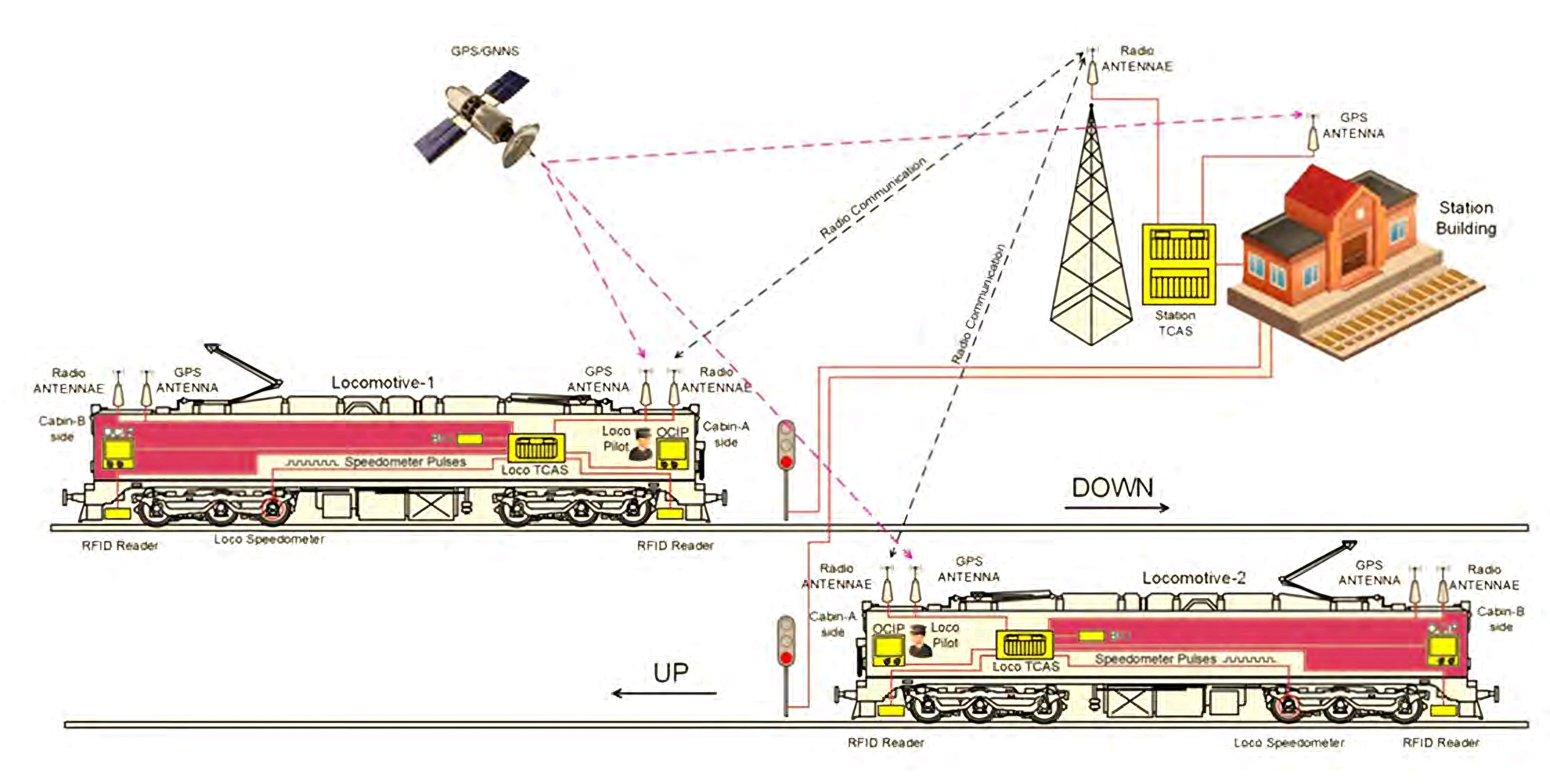
Working of KAVACH

KAVACH (transl. Armour), previously known as Train Collision Avoidance System, is an automatic train protection developed by Research Design and Standards Organisation for the Indian Railways. The components are manufactured by Medha Servo Drives, HBL Power Systems, and Kernex Microsystems. As per the Ministry of Railways, it is one of the cheapest train protection systems available worldwide.

Development of the train collision avoidance system began in 2011 as an open architecture system, with field trials commencing in 2014. The first field trials on passenger trains were conducted in February 2016. It subsequently received safety integrity level (SIL-4) certification in 2019. It was adopted by the Indian Railways for roll out across the Indian railway system in July 2020. In the 2022-23 union budget, funds were allcated for the implementation of KAVACH across 2,000 km (1,200 mi) of track during the financial year, with a target of extending the system to 34,000 km (21,000 mi) of track length 2027–28. In January 2025, a Parliamentary Standing Committee raised concerns over the slow pace of its rollout.

== Overview ==
Kavach incorporates several key characteristics of the European Train Control System (ETCS) as well as the Indian Anti-Collision Device (ACD); however, ETCS is wider in its scope, since Kavach is not intended to function as a replacement for traditional Lineside signals. While ETCS requires a centralised trackside infrastructure, Kavach is distributed, permitting piece-meal deployments. Kavach is also not intended to have interoperability with other country's systems, unlike ETCS' rigorous cross-border interoperability requirements. These aspects make it cheaper than ETCS.

To use Kavach, each train must be either built with compatible apparatus or to undergo a retrofit of such apparatus. The system consists of few core elements, out of which computer and UHF/GSM radio infrastructure (which consists of radio modems and antennas) are fitted, both at stations and onboard the locomotives; remaining are the radio-frequency identification (RFID) tags, that are placed between the running rails; and onboard the locomotives, there are RFID readers to read those RFID tags placed on the tracks along with a Brake Interface Unit (BIU) to provide Kavach, the interface to control the locomotive's braking system.

Kavach uses many data inputs to ascertain the location and direction of the train. The timing data is confirmed by a GPS satellite link, while the location and direction are measured by an odometer that resets itself whenever the train passes over an RFID tag. Loco pilots are provided with information through a DMI screen; an event recorder is present to retain a record of all interactions. Specific data exchanged includes speed, direction, location, and identifiers (individual to train and tracks). Some of the track-fitted RFID tags are used for additional purposes, such as to communicate an upcoming signal, level crossing, or the train's entry and exit from a Kavach-covered area.

All messaging between trains and the trackside infrastructure is handled through radio communication. The radio towers used by the Kavach for communication are installed alongside the tracks, aligned with the lineside signalling equipment and railway stations, and are deployed at a regular interval of 1–5 km, depending on the overall terrain. Kavach communicate with relevant signalling control stations, being interfaced with both electronic interlocking (EI) and route relay interlocking (RRI) systems, functioning in both absolute and automatic block signaling sections to retrieve information on signal aspects, permitted speeds, movement authority, and any restrictions; these criteria are continuously and automatically checked against each train's reported criteria and presented to the loco pilot on the DMI screen. The GSM-R radio link is also used to send data to the Network Monitoring System (NMS) to log all train movements, inputs, and fault messages. Appropriate fault teams are automatically contacted to address issues that arise in real time.

The initial implementation of the system harnesses ultra high frequency (UHF) radio frequencies, while the LTE-R based version of Kavach (Version 4.0) will soon be rolled out. Also, work is underway to integrate Kavach with Traffic Management System (TMS), Electronic Interlocking System (EIS).

== Functions ==
Primarily, Kavach works on the principle of continuous supervision of the movement authority, and is designed to maintain train speed within the specified limits. It can automatically apply brakes to slow down or to bring the train to a complete standstill, in case the loco pilot violates the speed restrictions or fails to act in time to prevent signal passed at danger (SPAD), thereby reducing the risks of collision in block sections and on running lines at stations. It displays upcoming signal aspects in the loco pilot's cab on the DMI screen; this feature aids in the operation of high-speed trains and assists loco pilots during low visibility weather conditions.

Additionally, Kavach offers a few non-signalling-based non-SIL features, such as providing protection from head-on, rear-end, and side collisions by estimating the length of the track that the train is occupying in a block section and identifying the track that the train is on. It can detect and stop the train in case of a rollback. It automatically blows the horn when approaching a level crossing and manual SOS function which would trigger emergency brakes of all nearby trains.

== Development ==
=== Origins ===
During the early twenty-first century, Indian Railways became increasingly interested in deploying automatic train protection (ATP) upon its existing mixed-traffic routes. An extensive evaluation of internationally available systems, such as the European Train Control System (ETCS), was conducted; it was ultimately concluded that there was no existing off the shelf ATP system that fulfilled its requirements. These requirements included the prevention of instances of signal passed at danger (SPAD), collision prevention, in-cab signalling, automatic whistling at level crossings, intelligent real-time health monitoring, and to facilitate substantial speed and capacity increases for both freight and passenger operations. A further key target to be pursued in part via the addition of ATP is the Indian Railways' ambition to achieve a zero accident rate.

Instead of procuring and installing an existing system, a project to domestically develop a suitable ATP system was pursued by Indian Railways instead. During 2011, work on what would become Kavach commenced; this project was originally titled as the Train Collision Avoidance System (TCAS). An early proof of concept was produced in 2012 while a development order for the design and manufacture of the system was issued during the following year. It is an open architecture system, as there was an explicit requirement for it to be interoperable between multiple vendors unlike in the case of anti-collision device (ACD).

During 2014, the deployment of an initial trial system along a 265 km section of line commenced, upon with the first real world evaluations of Kavach were performed.

=== Validation ===
Between 2015 and 2017, field trials of the system were carried out. Data and experiences gathered from these trials were used to refine the specification, which was formalised in March-2017. Final approval of the system was issued in 2019, permitting the training of railway employees on Kavach ahead of the formal rollout and commencement of operations. Kavach has been subjected to tests performed by an Italy based independent safety assessor (ISA) ITALCERTIFER S.p.A. to validate its performance. The Stationary Kavach achieved mean time between failures (MTBF) of 60,000 hours, MTBF of Loco Kavach is 40,000 hours while the RFID Reader, Radio modems and GPS/GSM antennas have recorded MTBF of 100,000 hours; reportedly achieved an overall availability of 99.9% during testing. Accordingly, it has been certified with Safety Integrity Level (SIL)-4 for compliance with the CENELEC/ EN standards as per EN 50126:1999 (covering specification and demonstration of RAMS), EN 50128:2011 (relating to software for railway control and protection systems), EN 50129:2003 (concerning safety related electronic systems for signalling), EN 50159:2010 (covering safety related communication in transmission systems) norms.

=== Confirmatory Trials ===
On 04-March-2022, a high-profile live demonstration of Kavach was conducted between Gullaguda and Chitgidda railway stations in Secunderabad Division. Indian Railway minister Ashwini Vaishnaw was travelling in one locomotive travelling in one direction, while Vinay Kumar Tripathi, chairman and CEO of Indian Railway was travelling in another locomotive on the opposite direction on the same track while Kavach was operational. It detected that both locomotives were on the same track and responded by automatically applying the brakes on both trains, thus averting an impending collision.

On 16-February-2024, another trial of the system was carried out in the Agra Division. At 09:30 am, the trial commenced between Mathura and Palwal. Till 2 in the afternoon, the entire exercise was repeated in both up and down directions. The trial was done on an eight-car Vande Bharat train. During the trial, the Vande Bharat was travelling at s speed of 160 kmph and the system could stop the train 10 m before the red signal without the loco pilot applying brakes. A similar test will soon be carried out with the 16-coach Vande Bharat.

In March-2024, Italian certification and inspection service provider Italcertifer S.p.A. conducted a four-day independent safety assessment trial of the Kavach system installed between Mathura and Palwal section in the Agra Division, under the supervision of Kush Gupta, Deputy Chief Signal and Telecommunication Engineer of NCR. The assessment began on 19-March and concluded on 23-March. Multiple trials were conducted using a special trial train consisting of a WAP-5 locomotive and 10 LHB coaches at speeds ranging from 130 to 160 Kmph.

In September-2024, a successful trial of KAVACH 4.0 was conducted for the first time between Kota and Sawai Madhopur of Kota Division in West Central Railway zone, in the presence of the Railway Minister Ashwini Vaishnaw onboard the locomotive cab. The train travelling at the speed of 130 km/h (81 mph) stopped just before 50 m (160 ft) before a red signal without human interference in the braking system. According to a railway official, “The train was running at 130 kmph and the moment it entered a section where there was a permanent speed restriction of 120 kmph, the Kavach brought down its speed to 120 and then after crossing it regained the 130 kmph speed.” The system has been tested for seven different emergency situations and has provided satisfactory results. In the following situation, the train entered a "loop" with a speed restriction of 30 km/h (19 mph) and the Kavach successfully brought the speed down from 130 km/h (81 mph) to the desired speed before entering the loop. During the other trials, the station master reported some kind of faults with the train when the Kavach system automatically applied its brakes to stop it, while in the other situation, the system applied the horns before a level crossing when the loco pilot failed to do so. The trial continued for half an hour.

== Versions ==
Version	Rollout year	Description
0.0	2008	ACD's early proof of concept
1.0	2008	ACD (patented by KRCL)
2.0	2009	Improved version of ACD
2.1	2011	KAVACH's early proof of concept
2.2	2011	—
2.3	2011	—
2.4	2011	—
3.0	2012	Complete specs revision
3.1	2012	—
3.1.1	2012	First ever real world field trials were done in 2014.
3.2	2017	Current version SIL-4 certified as per CENELEC standards in 2019.
4.0	2024	Specs restructured on the basis of experience from R&D and extended field trials. New features include: Incorporation of LTE-R modem with SDMA radio protocol. Integration of TSRMS, TMS & BTM (for interoperability with TPWS). Interface for connecting adjacent station Kavach(s), enabling soft handover of loco Kavach(s) communication from one to another in radio-signal overlapping zone.
T.B.A	T.B.A	Anticipated features include: Interoperability with ETCS (L1 & L2); E-Authority to pass signal at danger; cybersecurity measures; uniform braking algorithm; interface for EI; integration with EOTT, CTC & VCU.

== System Architecture ==
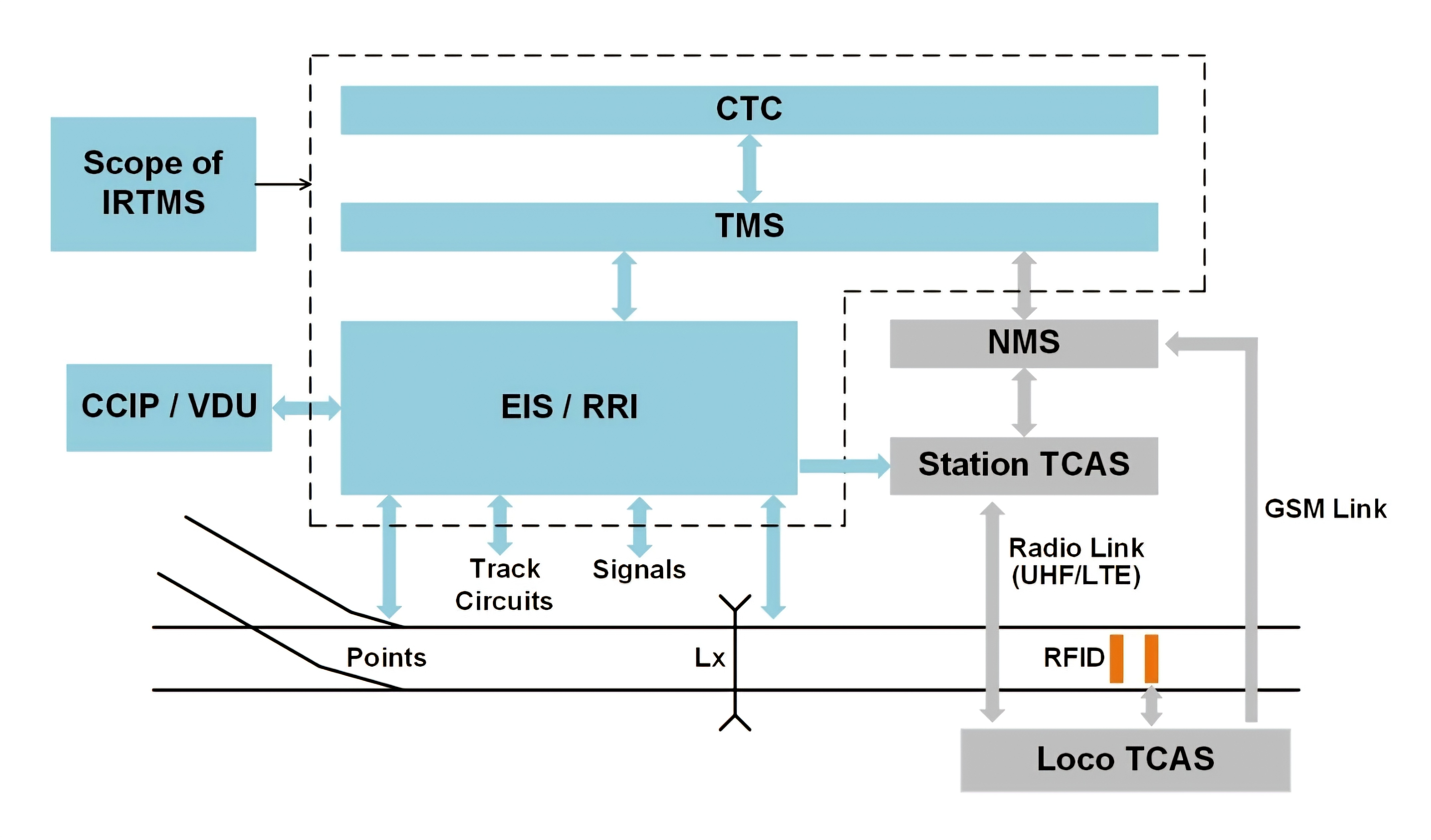
Flowchart illustrating the exchange of data between various components of KAVACH (grey) and other signalling equipment (blue)

=== Trackside and Stationary Components ===
==== RFID Tags ====
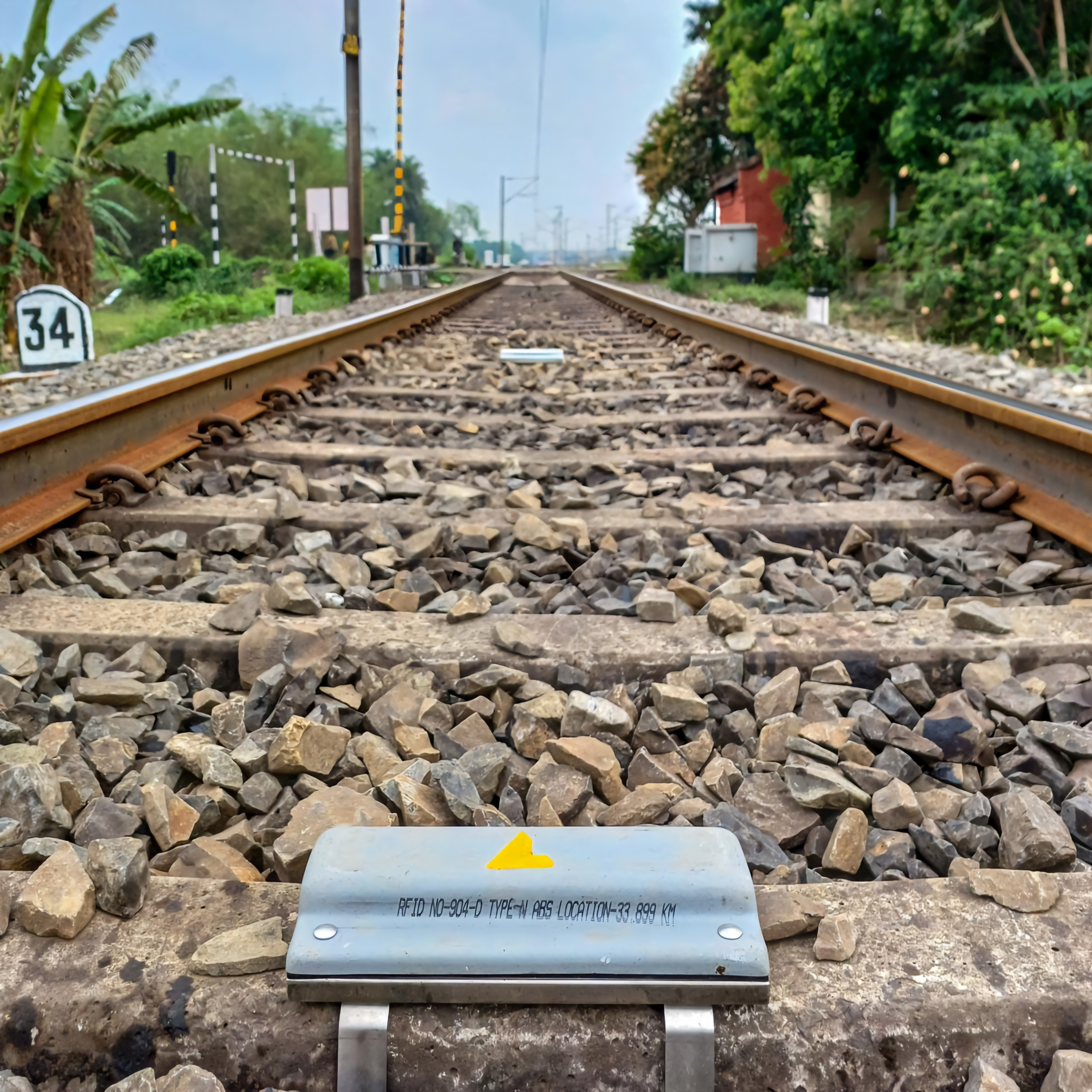
RFID tags clamped on the track sleeper near a level crossing

RFID Tags are fastened to the track sleepers at predetermined intervals. It contains pre-programmed data and a distinct track identification number (TIN). The RFID Tag transfers track information and precise location data to the onboard KAVACH computer when a locomotive passes over them and is scanned by the locomotive's RFID readers.

==== Stationary Master Computer ====
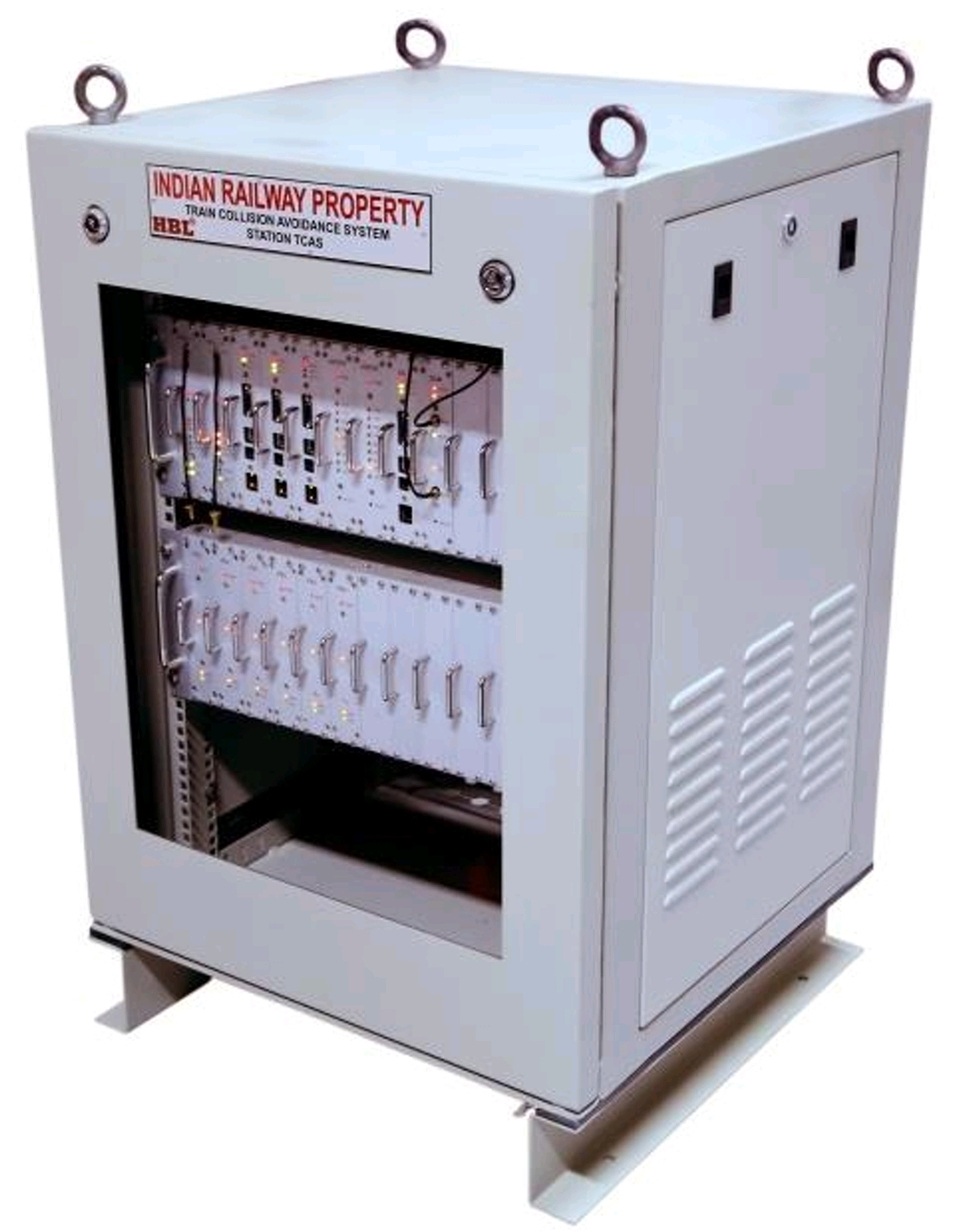
KAVACH Master Computer

The stationary Master Computer consists of a Vital Computer (electronic modules) and radio modems.

===== Vital Computer =====
The Vital Computer is the heart of stationary KAVACH units. It consists of a number of electronic modules with software that performs all the tasks. It receives information from signalling and interlocking systems and generates messages that are relayed to the locomotive by the radio unit in real-time.

===== Radio Unit and Antennas =====
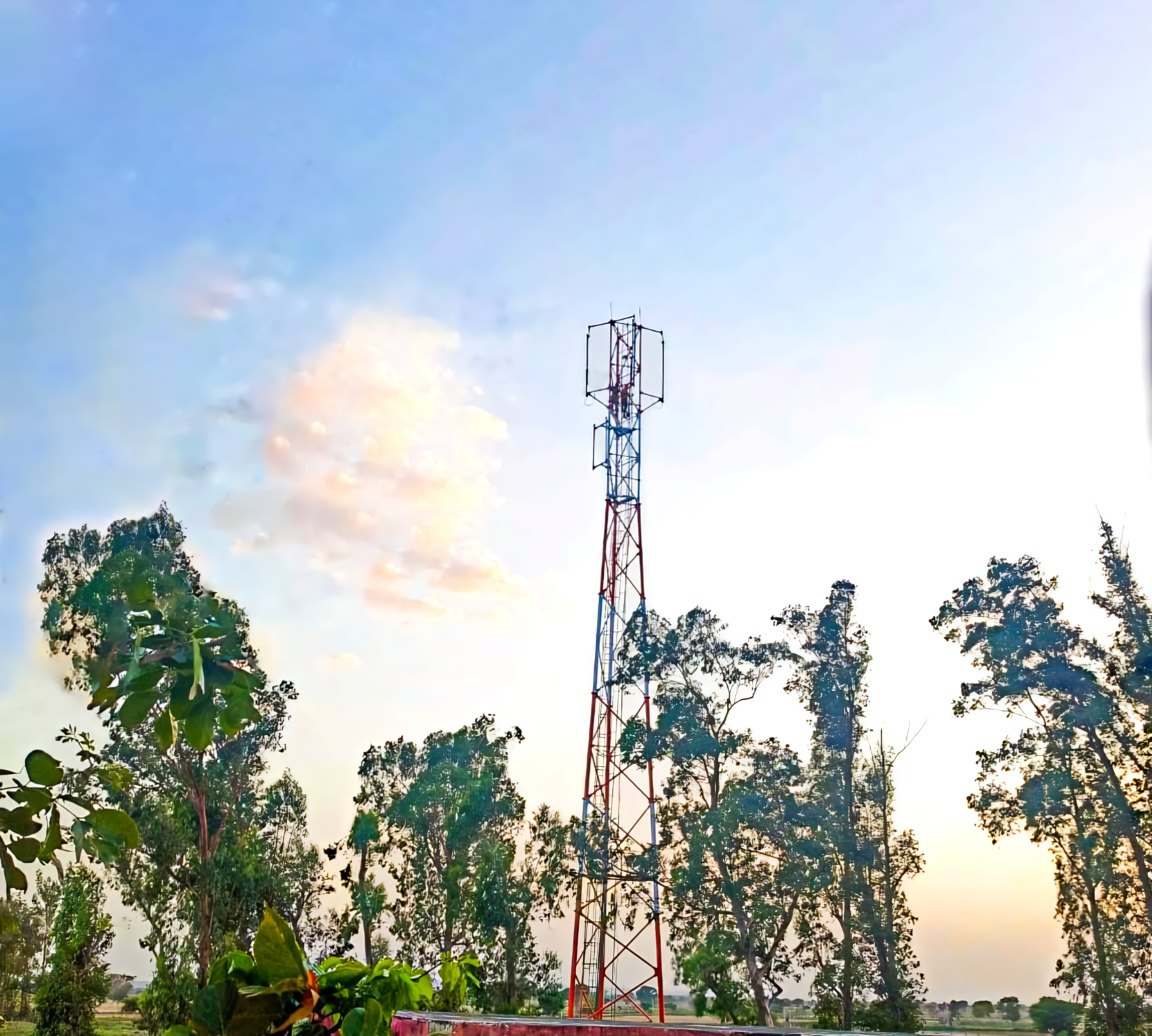
KAVACH station radio tower

KAVACH's radio unit consists of two duplex UHF radio modems having separate pair of Tx/Rx MIMO antennas. Radio modems have a channel bandwidth of 25 KHz and a working frequency range of 406–470 MHz. It uses TDMA and FDMA radio communication protocols to connect with the locomotive's onboard KAVACH unit.

==== Remote Interface Unit (RIU) ====
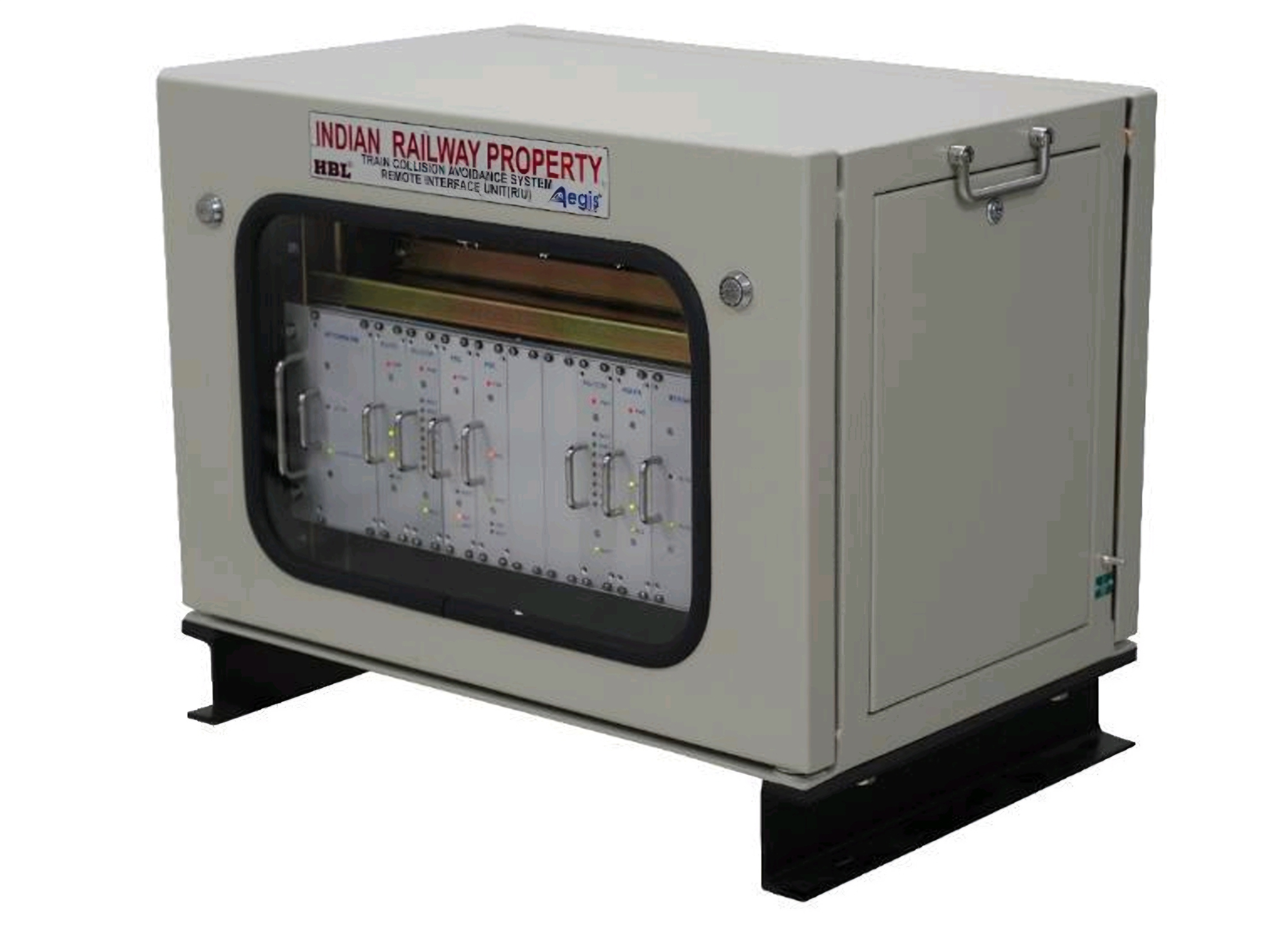
KAVACH Remote Interface Unit (RIU)

RIU is identical to the stationary master computer, without the radio unit. It is used for retrieving remote signalling functions like from the end cabins, distributed interlocking systems, level crossings, and intermediate block sections coming within the coverage area of the station's radio tower. It relays information and exchanges data with the stationary master computer over fibre-optic cables (dark fibre).

==== Station Master Operation cum Indication Panel (SMOCIP) ====
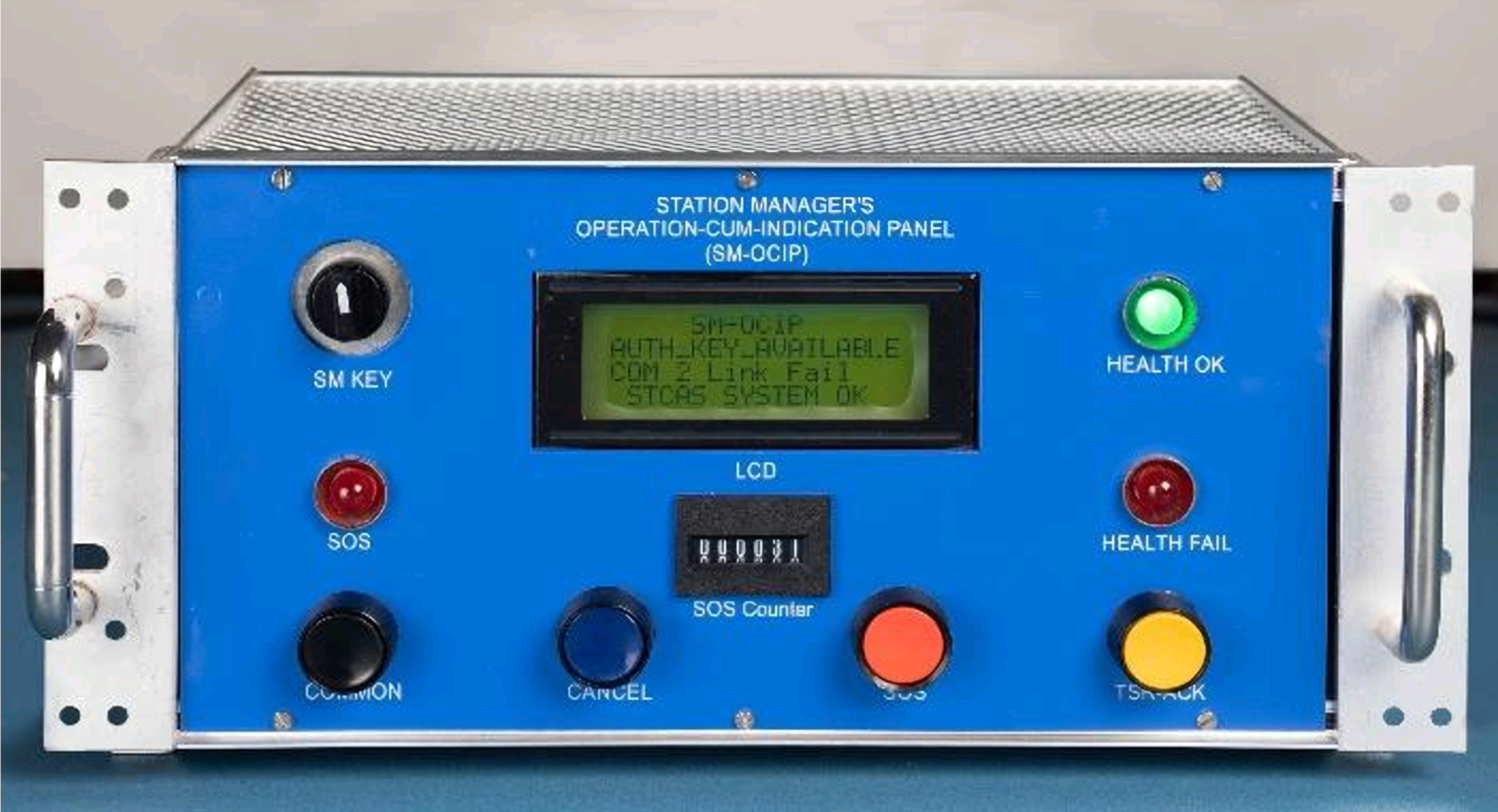
KAVACH SM-OCIP Unit

SMOCIP is installed on the station master's desk and features an LCD for reading messages, an analog SOS counter and buttons for generating SOS and acknowledging messages. It requires a physical key to operate to avoid undesired and accidental operation of buttons.

=== Locomotive on-board components ===
==== RFID reader ====
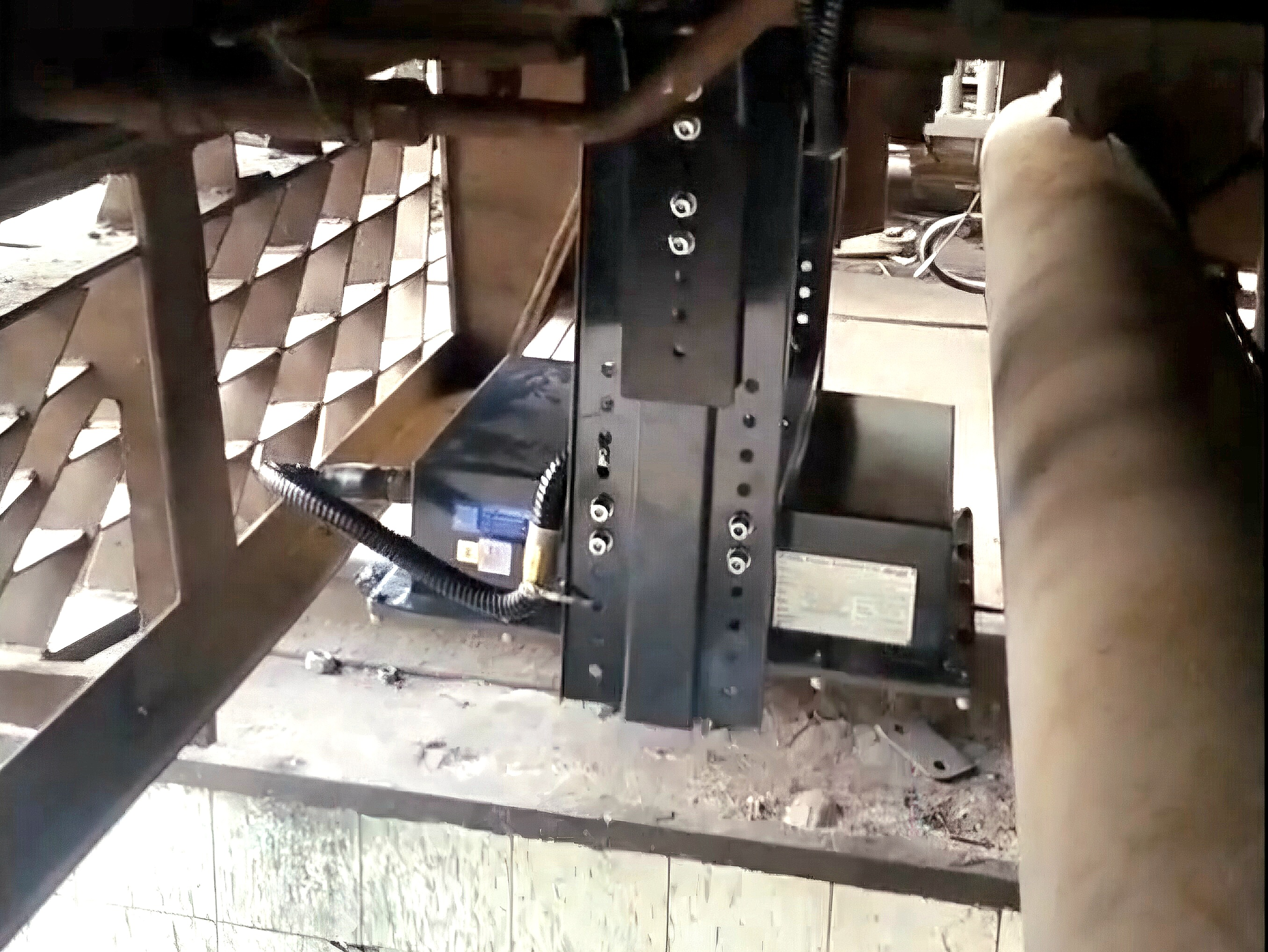
RFID reader mounted under a WAP-7 locomotive

A locomotive fitted with KAVACH has two RFID readers mounted under its underframe. It scans the RFID tags attached to the track and transmits the information to the onboard KAVACH computer for processing.

==== Onboard radio unit and antennas ====
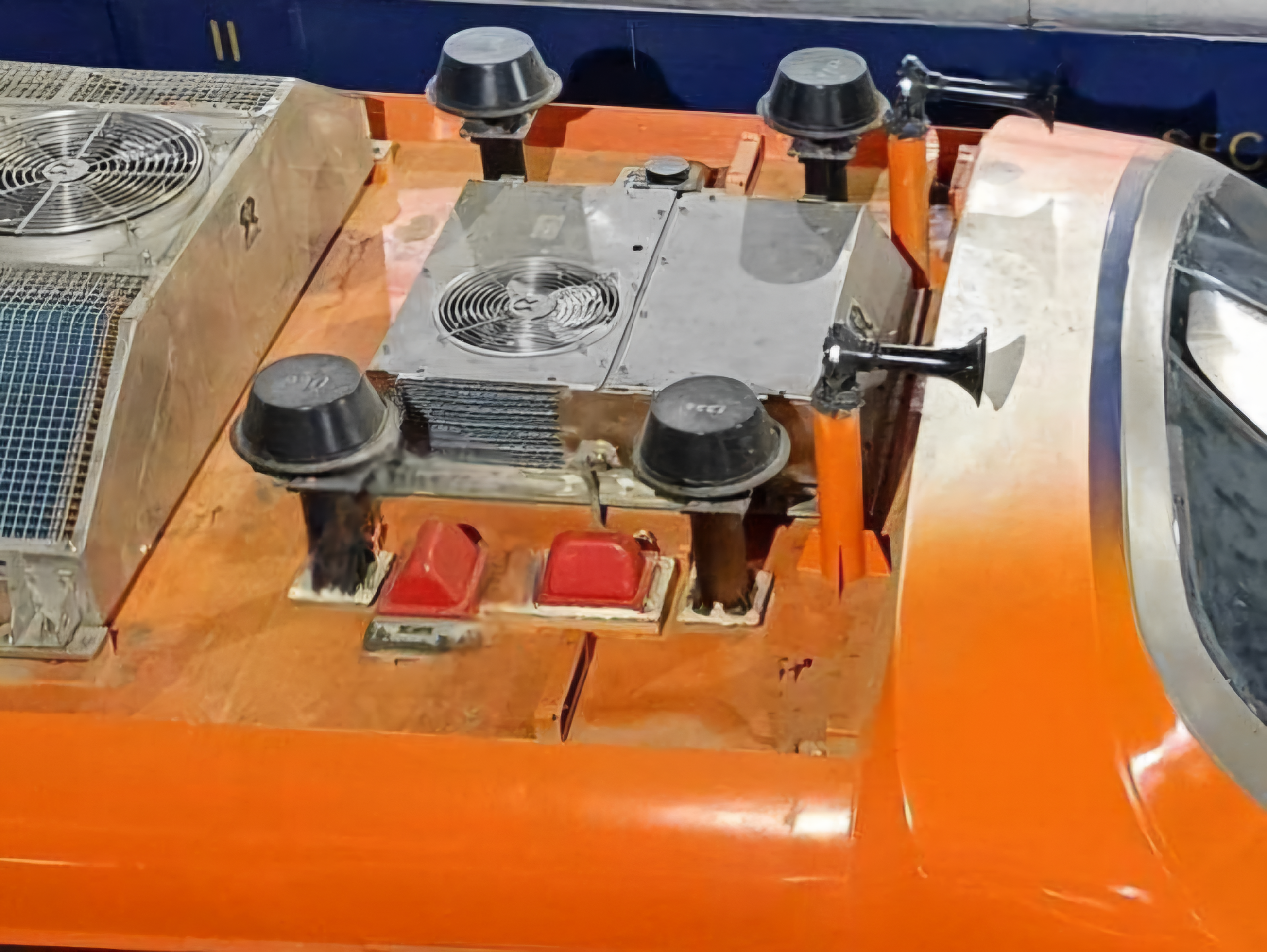
Two pairs of UHF Tx/Rx antennas (black) along with GSM and GPS antennas (red) on Vande Bharat trainset

The onboard radio unit is similar to that of the stationary KAVACH radio unit.

Along with the two pairs of Tx/Rx UHF MIMO antennas, an additional GSM/GPRS and GPS/GNSS antenna are fitted on the locomotive.

KAVACH uses GSM-R network (as of version 3.2) for communicating fault messages to Network Monitoring System (NMS) and for transferring authentication keys with the Stationary TCAS unit as well as with any nearby Loco TCAS units.

Both GPS and NavIC are used for updating live location of the locomotive and also for synchronizing GPS Time with the CPU Time of onboard KAVACH Computer.

==== Onboard KAVACH computer ====
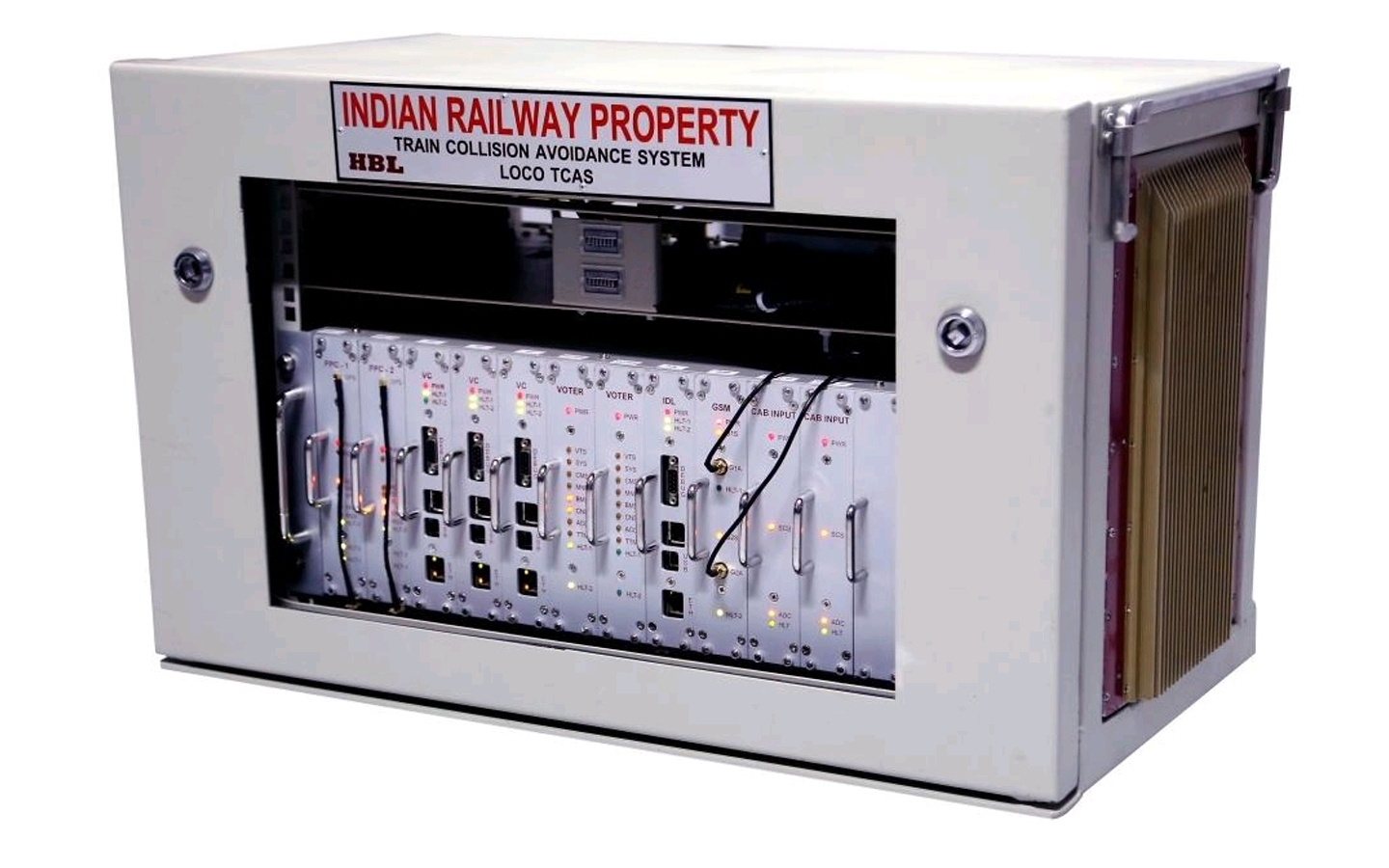
KAVACH locomotive onboard computer

Onboard computer is the main data processing centre of KAVACH system. It supervises the movement of the train by exchanging and synchronizing information collected from other onboard equipment, stationary KAVACH units and as well as from other nearby KAVACH equipped locomotives.

==== Driver Machine Interface (DMI) ====
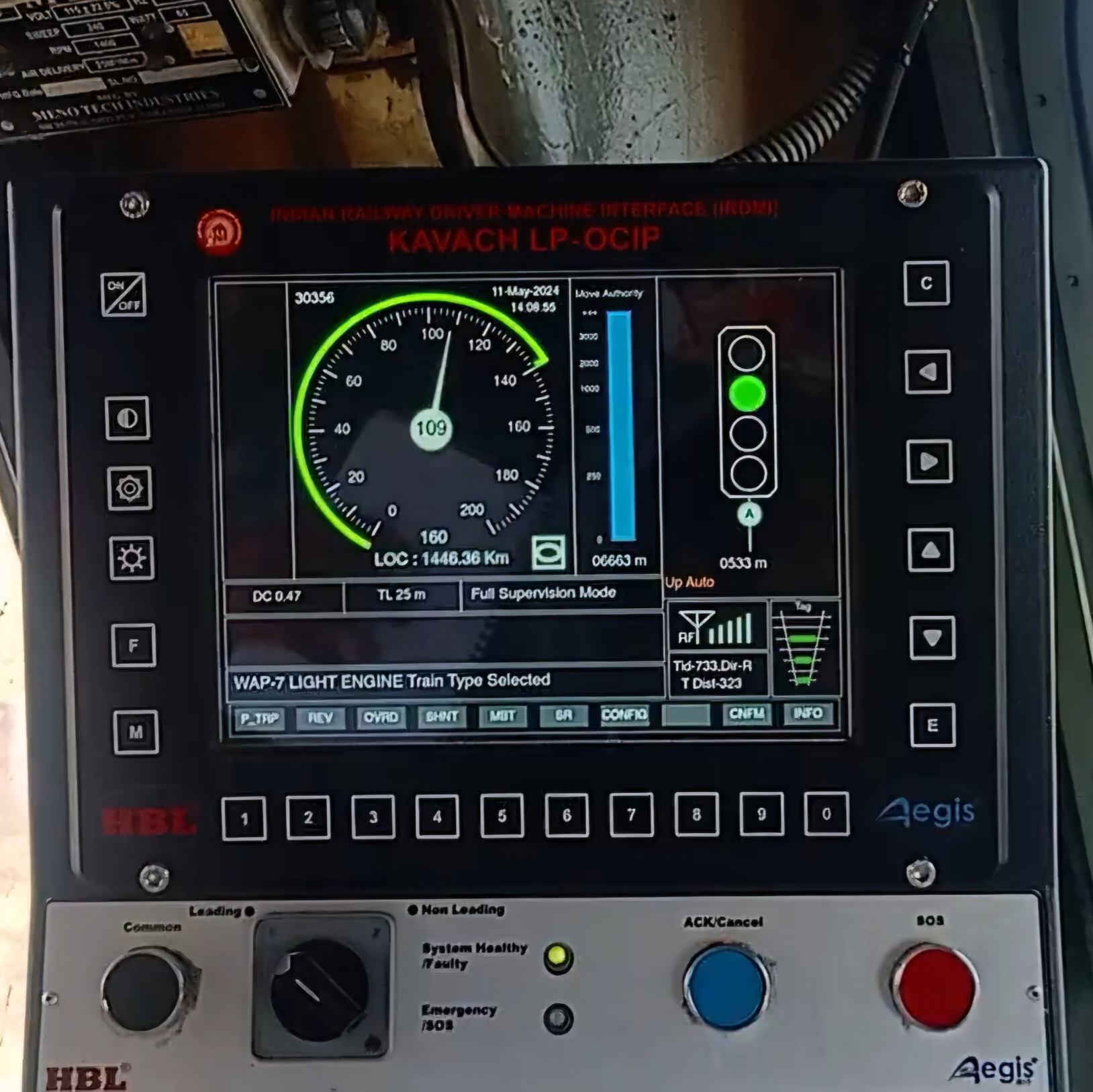
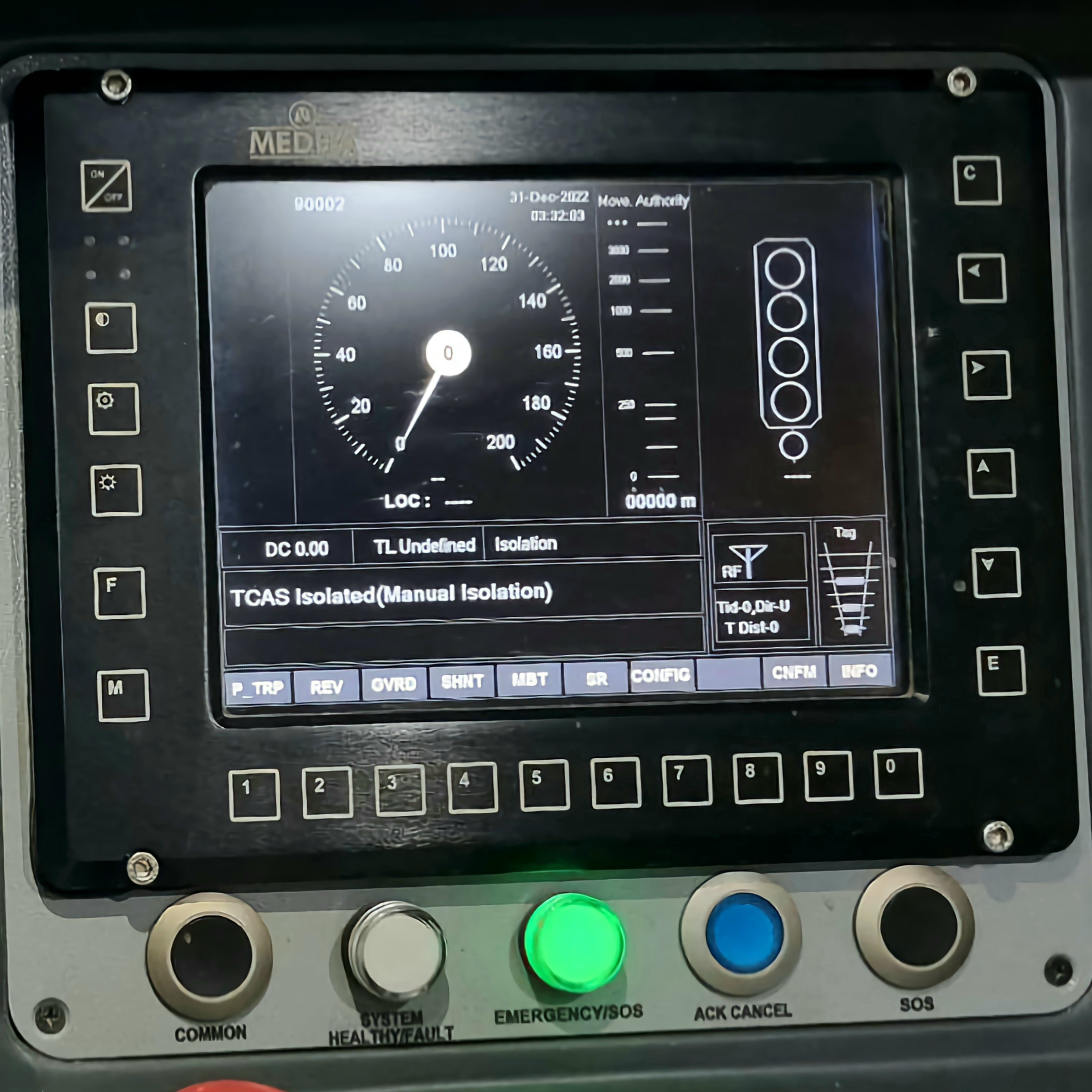
KAVACH DMI in a WAP-7 locomotive (left) and in a Vande Bharat trainset (right)

DMI, also known as the Loco Pilot-Operation Cum Indication Panel (LP-OCIP), consists of a colour TFT touchscreen display and buttons. It uses audio-visuals to display warnings and information. It features a SOS and an acknowledgement button for use of loco pilots.

==== Brake Interface Unit (BIU) ====
BIU provides KAVACH with an interface to the locomotive's braking system and monitors its overall health. It prioritises the highest brake demand between the one initiated manually by the loco pilots and the one initiated by the KAVACH and applies brakes accordingly.

=== Other components ===
==== Network Monitoring System (NMS) ====
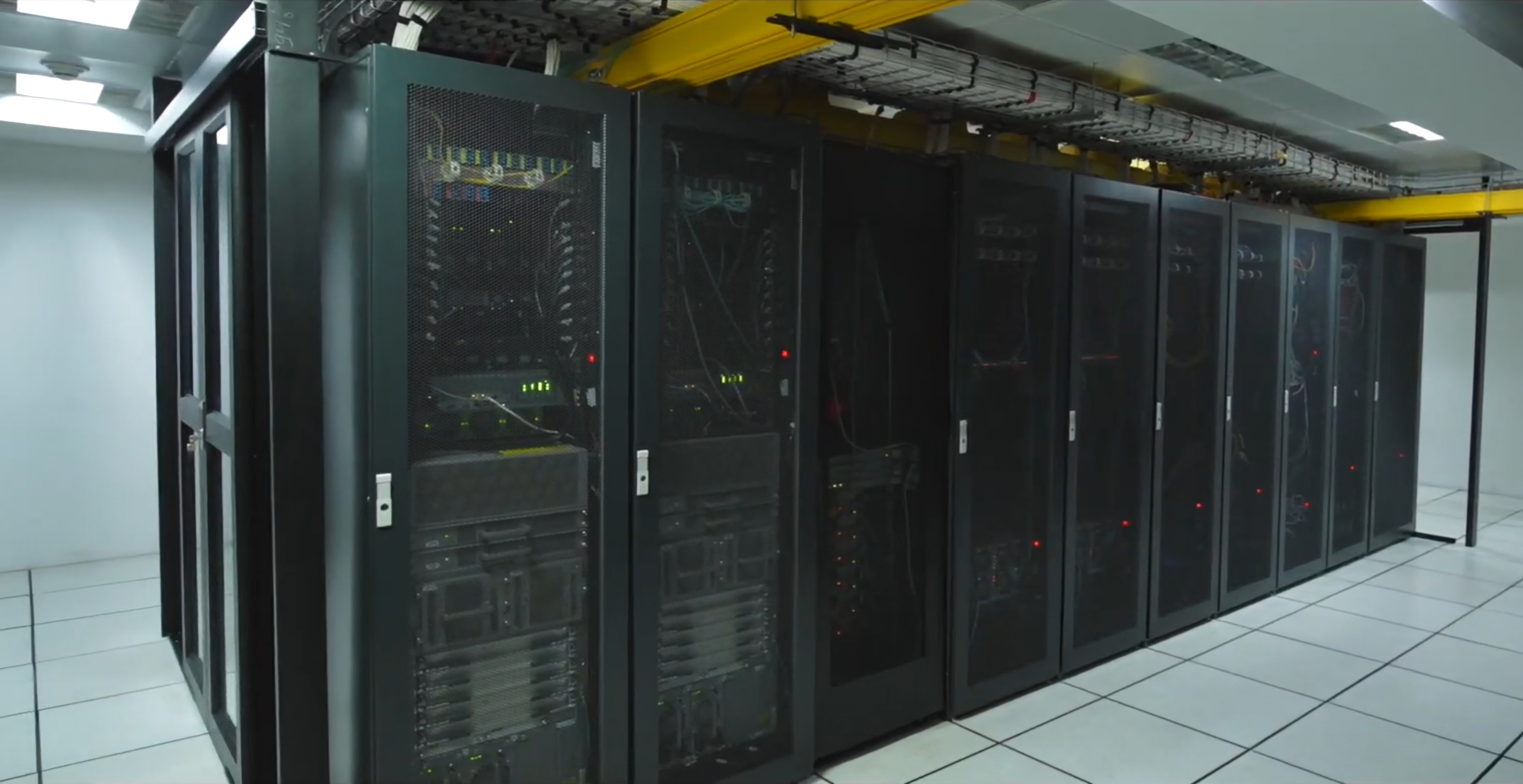
Network Monitoring System server of Kavach

NMS over the OFC network (E1 interface) centralises monitoring of Kavach-equipped trains and stations. It handles Error Troubleshooting, offline simulation and Real-time monitoring of Loco-Kavach. Both Stationary and Loco-Kavach send fault messages to the NMS; while Loco-Kavach units are exclusively connected to NMS through the GSM-R link; stationary Kavach units are connected through both Ethernet (OFC cables) and the GSM-R link. A central server in the Division Control Room logs all relayed information and radio packets exchanged between stations and locomotives, which are made accessible through the NMS.

==== Key Management System (KMS) ====
KMS is a server that shares secret Authentication Keys with Stationary and Loco-Kavach units to ensure message integrity and authenticity during Radio communication. These keys protect messages from modification and impersonation and are shared after authenticating the Loco-Kavach through One-time password. KMS is deployed on a secure internet server, and Loco-Kavach units periodically request these keys for radio communication. GSM-R modules in the Train event recorder connects Loco-Kavach to GPRS. KMS uses AES-128 encryption for communication between Stationary and Loco-Kavach units and transfers keys through GSM-R. A central KMS server at headquarters manages key distribution, with all Kavach IDs and SIM numbers provided to RailTel for updates. Communication is currently on GPRS but will shift to LTE-R with Kavach-4.0.

==== Temporary Speed Restriction Management System (TSRMS) ====
TSRMS is newly introduced on Kavach-4.0. It is a dedicated server used for feeding temporary speed restrictions to the track profile data packet. Like that of NMS, each Stationary-Kavach unit is also connected to the TSRMS OFC network through its own dedicated E1 interface. The network uses the Ethernet protocol to exchange data packets between Stationary-Kavach units and the TSRMS server and uses LTE-R for Authenticated Key Exchange with Loco-Kavach.

== Operation Modes ==
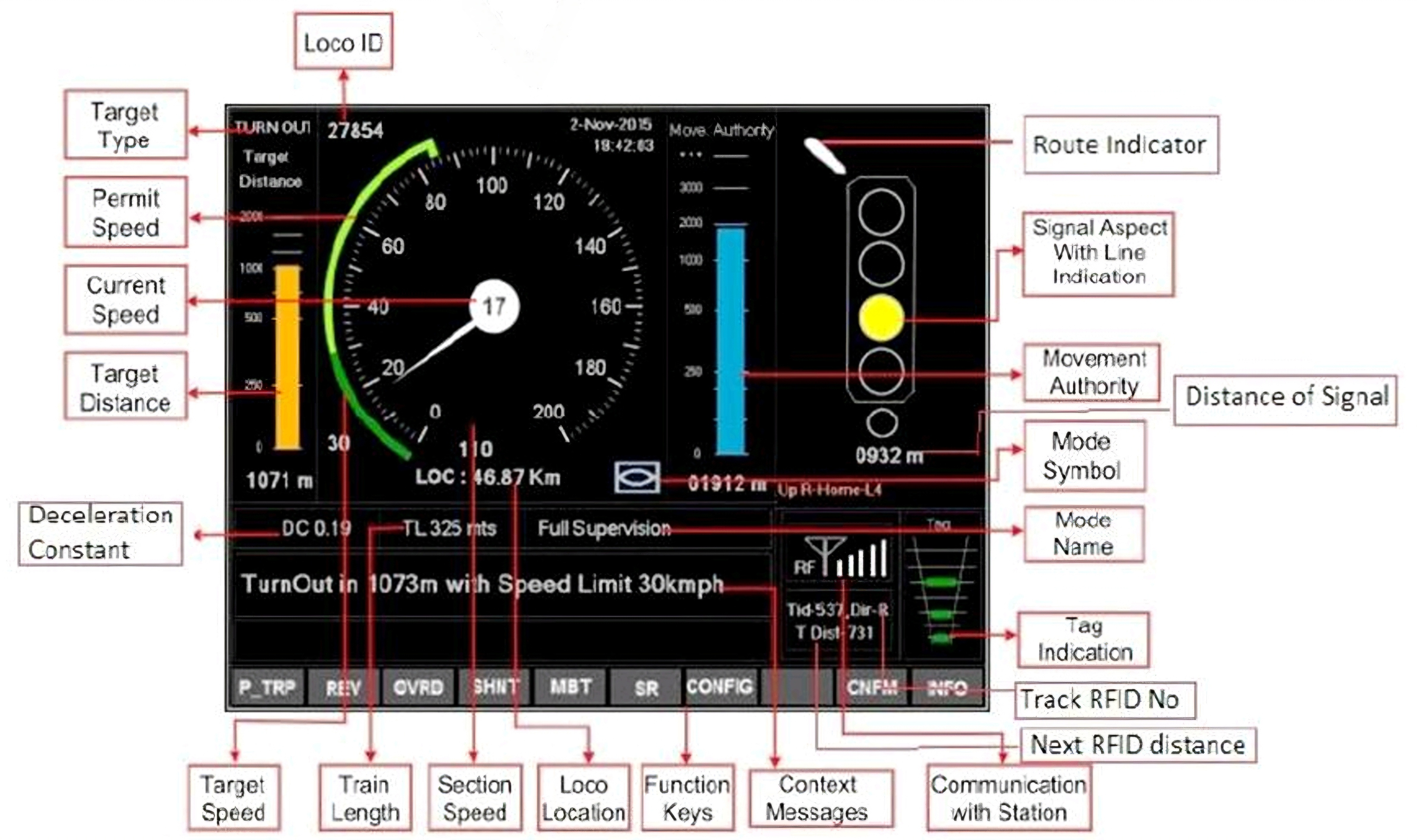
Screenshot of KAVACH DMI highlighting areas of display

The locomotive operation modes and their functions in KAVACH are comparable to those in European Train Control System (ETCS) with the exception of a few modes that were not included in KAVACH since they were not applicable to standard operating procedures of Indian Railways. The modes that are present in KAVACH are as follows:

DMI symbol	Name of mode	Description
	Full Supervision Mode	TCAS has all required information
	Limited Supervision Mode	TCAS has limited information
	On Sight Mode	Enables the train to enter a section that is already occupied by another train
	Staff Responsible Mode	Loco pilot drives the train at his own responsibility
	Shunting Mode	Enables the loco to navigate shunt signals as they are not recognized by TCAS
	Stand By Mode	Default mode, TCAS will perform standstill supervision
	Trip Mode	After the train has passed the signal at danger, this mode comes into effect and applies emergency brakes
	Post Trip Mode	After loco pilot acknowledges "Trip Mode", this mode comes into effect and releases brakes enabling the train to move at a restricted speed until next stop signal at OFF is crossed
	System Failure	On-board loco TCAS equipment detected system failure
	Non Leading Mode	Selection mode for Banker & MUed locomotives
	Reverse Mode	Enables the loco pilot to change the direction of locomotive without changing the active cab
	Override Mode	Enables the train to pass the signal at danger
(no symbol)	Isolation Mode	Loco pilot disconnected TCAS

== Commissioning ==
On July 30, 2025, Union Railway Minister Ashwini Vaishnaw announced the successful implementation of Kavach 4.0, safety system, on the Mathura-Kota stretch of the busy Delhi-Mumbai corridor. Train speeds are set to increase beyond current limits once the testing phase is successfully completed.

== Training of Personnel ==
The railway minister stated that Kavach 4.0 is expected to be deployed across the entire country within the next six years. To facilitate this large-scale implementation:

- More than 30,000 railway staff members have already received training on the Kavach system.
- IRISET (Indian Railway Institute of Signal Engineering and Telecommunications) has partnered with 17 AICTE-accredited engineering colleges, universities, and institutions through MoUs to integrate Kavach technology into B.Tech programs, helping build a future-ready talent pool.

== Deployment ==
=== Cost of Installation ===
Kavach is one of the least expensive ATP systems in the world. The cost of installing it on the tracks, including equipment, is ₹50 lakh (US$52,000) per route kilometre and ₹70 lakh (US$73,000) to fit the equipment in one locomotive.

=== Manufacturers ===
The Original Equipment Manufacturers (OEMs) that are manufacturing the Kavach equipment includes Medha Servo Drives, HBL Power Systems, and Kernex Microsystems. Other firms that have been vying for the approval to be vendors include GGTronic', Quadrant Future Tek, Areca Embedded Systems, Lotus Wireless Technologies and the state-owned Bharat Heavy Electricals Limited. MNCs like Japan's KYOSAN and Germany's Siemens are also working on Kavach.

KEC International and RailTel have partnered with Kernex Microsystems and Quadrant FutureTek respectively as 'system integrator' for rapid deployment of the Kavach system.

As of September 2024, the Kavach technology of RailTel – Quadrant FutureTek partnership has been cleared by Research Designs & Standards Organisation (RDSO).

=== Current Status ===
As of April-2022, Kavach has been implemented on 144 locomotives, 1,445 km route and 134 stations in South Central Railway zone, while implementation on 1,200 km is underway. Upgrades to Kavach will be made so that it can handle trains at speeds of up to 160 kmph prior to it being implemented across 3,000 km of track, including the majority of the New Delhi–Mumbai main line and Howrah–Delhi main line. as part of the Mission Raftar project being undertaken by Indian Railways.

The Union Budget of India for the FY 2022-23 allocated fund for the rapid implementation of Kavach along 2,000 km of track, while also sanctioning its later implementation across 34,000 km track of Golden Quadrilateral rail route. Indian commentators have claimed that had Kavach been deployed at the site of the 2023 Odisha train collision that the system would have prevented the accident from occurring.

By June-2023, two percent of all Indian trains had been outfitted with Kavach apparatus.

As per a report of The Times of India in July 2024, the tendering process to implement Kavach system for two routes of Howrah–Nagpur–Mumbai line and Howrah–Prayagraj–Mumbai line (via Itarsi) is being processed. This will be the first route with Kavach system in Central Railway zone.

In the Budget Estimation of FY2024-25, ₹1.08 lakh crore (US$11 billion) has been allotted to deploy the Kavach 4.0 system in the network. As of August 2024,

- 1,456 km or 3% of the entire rail network along with 144 locomotives of South Central Railway is equipped with Kavach.
- From FY2025-26 onwards, Kavach will be implemented on 5,000-5,500 km of the network per year.
- As for the locomotives, the rollout of the system is planned in multiple phases.
  - In the first phase, tender will be released for equipping 10,000 (50%) locomotives with Kavach. The cost of Kavach per locomotive is around ₹72 lakh (US$75,000) which translates to approximately ₹7,200 crore (US$750 million) project for the first phase. The tender for first phase is planned to be closed by October 2024. This phase will also include equipping 9,000 Route kms of network with Kavach 4.0 version. The sanction for first phase has been secured.
  - The second phase will incorporate the system for the rest of 10,000 locomotives. The newly built WAG-9HH locomotives and Vande Bharat trainsets will be equipped with Kavach 4.0 apparatus.
- The survey work for 8,000 stations is to be completed by December 2024. It will take four years to equip the entire inventory of locomotives with Kavach. As for the routes, New Delhi–Mumbai main line and Howrah–Delhi main line will be covered initially which measures 3,000 km. This will be followed by Delhi – Chennai and Mumbai – Chennai routes covering 3,300 km. Subsequently, this will be increased to all automatic signalling sections of 5,000 Rkm.

The tender for the first phase of implementation, worth ₹7,200 crore (US$750 million), is to be released on 19-September-2024.

On 12-August-2025, West Central Railway awarded HBL Power Systems a contract of ₹54.12 crore (US$5.6 million) to install Kavach in the 166 km Kota-Ruthiyai segment and the Sogaria-Kota "C" section. Along with building towers and other related tasks, it entails installation at 18 stations and level crossing gate locations.

Progress of key items comprising Kavach system on Indian Railways up to 14-July-2025
Serial no.	Items	Progress
1	Laying of optical fibre cable	5,856 km
2	Installation of telecom towers	619 Nos.
3	Provision of Kavach at Stations	708 Nos.
4	Provision of Kavach in Loco	1,107 Locos
5	Installation of track side equipment	4,001 Rkm

== See also ==
- Train Warning System
