= Faizabad Bus Depot =

Bus station in Faizabad, India

Faizabad City Bus Depot
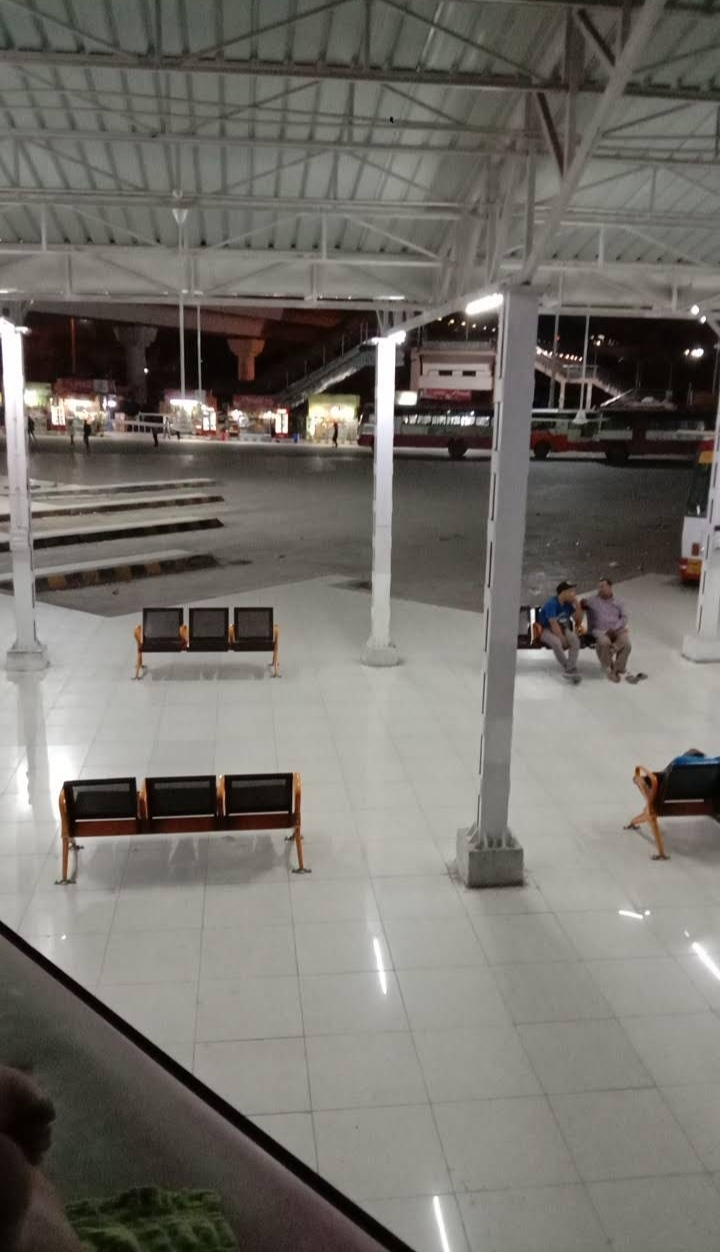
- Faizabad Bus Depot

General information
- Other names: Ayodhya Dham Bus Depot
- Location: D.R.C. Army Centre, Civil Line, Faizabad, Uttar Pradesh-224001
- System: Bus station
- Owner: UPSRTC
- Operator: UPSRTC
- Platforms: 4

Construction
- Structure type: At Grade
- Platform levels: 1st
- Parking: Yes
- Cycle facilities: Yes

Other information
- Station code: UP 42
- Fare zone: Ayodhya

History
- Opened: 1960

Passengers
- 2017: 789,456

Faizabad City Bus Depot (officially Ayodhya Dham Bus Depot) is a UP Roadways Bus Depot in Faizabad, Uttar Pradesh, India. It is the central bus stand for the Uttar Pradesh State Road Transport Corporation, and have lines running for majority of other destinations in UP and further north. Major cities connected by direct bus are Delhi, Jaipur, Etawah, Agra, Mathura, Ajmer, etc. There is Rajasthan Roadways Deluxe, Super deluxe and AC buses as well as private travels also available from the major cities.

On 14 June 2021, the Uttar Pradesh Cabinet agreed to spend ₹400 crore (about $48.5 million) building a new bus station in Ayodhya. The Uttar Pradesh culture department will provide the transport department with 9 acres (0.036 km^{2}) land to build the bus station on. Sidharth Nath Singh (an Uttar Pradesh cabinet minister) said: "A grand temple of Lord Ram is being built in Ayodhya and hence devotees from far-off places will come to visit. Keeping this in mind, a proposal to build a bus station of international standards has been approved."
