= Train Warning System (India) =

Safety system

The Train Warning System in India is a device that helps prevent trains passing signals at stop. The system is an implementation of Level 1 ERTMS.

== See also ==
- Anti-collision device
- Automatic Train Protection
- ETCS
