= Ghazipur =

- City
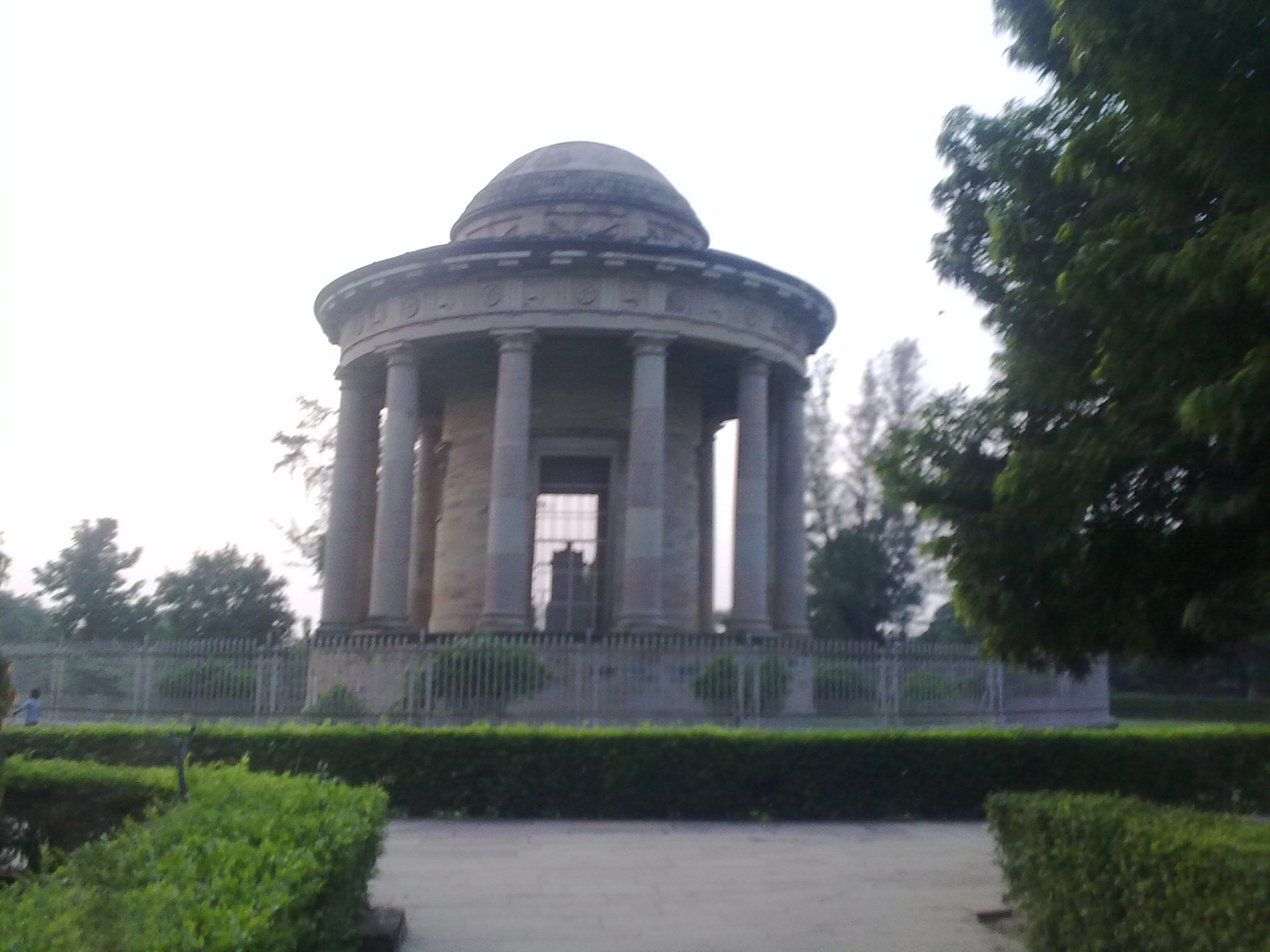
- The Tomb of Lord Cornwallis, Governor-General of Bengal
- Nickname: City of Martyrs
- Location in Uttar Pradesh, India Ghazipur (India)
- Coordinates: 25.58°N 83.57°E
- Country: India
- State: Uttar Pradesh
- District: Ghazipur
- Settled: 350-400 BCE
- Founded: 1330
- Officially Incorporated: 1820
- Founder: Sayyid Masud Ghazi

Government
  - Type: Municipal Council
  - Body: Ghazipur Municipal Council
  - Chairperson: Sarita Agarwal

Area
  - Total: 36.6 km^{2} (14.1 sq mi)

Population (2011)
  - Total: 110,587
  - Rank: 391
  - Sex ratio: 902 ♀/1,000♂
- Demonym: Ghazipuria or Ghazipuri

Languages
  - Official: Hindi & Urdu
  - Regional: Bhojpuri
- Time zone: UTC+5:30 (IST)
- PIN: 233001
- Telephone code: 91-548
- Vehicle registration: UP-61
- Website: www.ghazipur.nic.in

Ghazipur is a city in the state of Uttar Pradesh, India. Ghazipur City is the administrative headquarters of the Ghazipur district, one of the four districts that form the Varanasi division of Uttar Pradesh. It is located on the Ganges (Ganga) River near the border with Bihar state in eastern Uttar Pradesh, about 40 miles (65 km) northeast of Varanasi (Benares) and also called Lahuri Kashi. The city of Ghazipur also constitutes one of the seven distinct tehsils, or subdivisions, of the Ghazipur district.

Ghazipur is located near the eastern border with Bihar, approximately 80 km (50 mi) east of Varanasi. The city is internationally recognized for housing the world's largest legal opium factory, established in 1820 by the British East India Company. This historic facility continues to operate under government regulation and plays a significant role in the global pharmaceutical industry by producing opium-derived medicines.

== History ==
As per verbal and folk history, Ghazipur was covered with dense forest during the Vedic era and it was a place for the ashrams of saints during that period. The place is related to the Ramayana period. Jamadagni, the father of Parashurama, is said to have resided here. Gautama Maharishi and Chyavana are believed to have taught and delivered sermons here in the ancient period. Buddha gave his first sermon in Sarnath, which is not far from here. Some sources state that the original name was Gadhipur, which was renamed around 1330 after Ghazi Malik.

A 30 ft. high Ashoka Pillar is situated in Latiya, a village 30 km away from the city near Zamania Tehsil is a symbol of Mauryan Empire. It was declared a monument of national importance and protected by the archeological survey of India. In the report of tours in that area of 1871–72 Alexander Cunningham wrote, "The village receives its name from a stone lat, or monolith".

=== Prehistory and legendary founding ===
According to local tradition, Ghazipur was founded in 1330 CE, although archaeological evidence suggests the area may be significantly older. A popular but historically unverified legend claims the city was originally known as "Gadhipura," named after a mythical king, Gadhi. While this etymology is likely apocryphal, the presence of ancient architectural fragments along the riverbank and the remains of an old mound—believed to be the site of a former fort—indicate that a settlement existed in the region long before the recorded founding date.

The legend behind Ghazipur's foundation in 1330 is that Raja Mandhata, a descendant of the Chauhan Maharaj Prithviraj Chauhan III, had founded a fort at nearby Kathot and ruled a small kingdom from there. His nephew, who was the heir to the throne, abducted a local Muslim young woman, and her mother pleaded for help to the Muslim sultan of Delhi. As a result, 40 ghazis led by one Sayyid Masud set out to attack Kathot. They took the place by surprise and ended up killing Raja Mandhata. The nephew mustered an army and fought two battles against the ghazis, but was defeated in both. The first battle took place on the bank of the Besu and the other was at the site of Ghazipur. Sayyid Masud, who was now given the title Malik us-Sadat Ghazi, founded a city on the site of the second battle and called it Ghazipur.

=== Early recorded history: 1400s and 1500s ===
Legends aside, Ghazipur's first mention in contemporary sources is c. 1494, when Sikandar Lodi appointed Nasir Khan Lohani as the city's governor. Ghazipur flourished during Nasir Khan's long tenure. A new fort is said to have been built under his rule, replacing an older one at Hamzapur. A wave of immigration from Muslim settlers also began at this point and lasted until the late 1500s. New muhallas were built to house them.

After Sikandar Lodi died, there was a rival claimant named Muhammad Shah (son of Darya Khan Lodi, the former governor of Bihar). At first, Nasir Khan stayed loyal to Sikandar's son Ibrahim Lodi, but he was defeated by an army led by one Mian Mustafa, which then looted Ghazipur. At this point, Nasir Khan sided with Muhammad Shah, who restored him as governor. In 1527, Humayun led a force to Ghazipur while the main Mughal army under Babur was at Jaunpur; Nasir Khan fled, and Humayun occupied Ghazipur without resistance. He was recalled to assist Babur soon after, though, and Nasir Khan resumed control over Ghazipur. Nasir Khan submitted to Babur in person in 1528, after Babur took Gwalior, but Babur did not keep him as governor of Ghazipur. Instead, he gave the city to Muhammad Khan Lohani Ghazipuri, a relative of Nasir Khan who had joined Babur's side earlier.

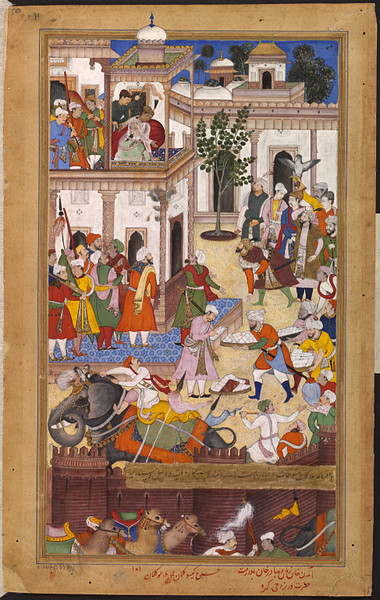
A painting of Ali Quli Khan and Bahadur Khan made in 1561, from Akbarnama

During Akbar's early rule, Ghazipur was held by Ali Quli Khan Zaman, who also founded the nearby town of Zamania. Ghazipur does not seem to have been affected by Khan Zaman's first rebellion against Akbar in 1565. During his second revolt, Mughal forces under Jafar Khan Turkman attacked Ghazipur, but Khan Zaman fled. After Khan Zaman's death in battle in 1567, Akbar put Ghazipur under Munim Khan's control. Quttul Khan a native, was made the jagirdar of large part of the sarkar taluka to Seorai, he was also a Dewan and later to his cousin Daud Khan of Dewaitha after his death, during the rule of Jahangir. Many positions were held by Raja Deendar Khan of Dildarnagar, during Aurangzeb and Alam Shah.

In the Ain-i Akbari, Ghazipur was the capital of a sarkar in Allahabad Subah.

=== Later Mughals ===
After the Mughals solidified their control over Bengal, Ghazipur lost most of its political importance, and later sources mention it less. Under Shah Jahan, as well as during Aurangzeb's early reign, Nawab Sufi Bahadur was governor of Ghazipur, he also build the jama masjid at Nawali.. He was succeeded by Nawab Atiqullah Khan, a native of Ghazipur who remained governor until Aurangzeb's death. Ghazipur does not seem to have been affected by the war between Aurangzeb and Shah Shuja in 1567, or by the civil wars following Aurangzeb's death. At some point after Farrukhsiyar's death in 1719, sarkar Ghazipur was part of a large territory granted to one Murtaza Khan as a jagir. In 1727, Murtaza Khan in turn leased this territory to Saadat Ali Khan I, the first Nawab of Awadh.

=== Nawabs of Awadh & Ghazipur ===
At first, Saadaat Ali Khan sub-leased these territories (Ghazipur, Jaunpur, Banaras, and Chunar) to his friend Rustam Ali Khan. Rustam Ali Khan had no interest in managing the territories himself, and someone named Mansa Ram ended up becoming the actual administrator. In 1738, Rustam Ali Khan retired from office. Ghazipur was given to Nawab Sheikh Abdullah, son of Muhammad Qasim a zamindar of Dharwar, while the remainder was given to Mansa Ram. Sheikh Abdullah and his son Nawab Fazal Ali Khan, both were the nawabs of Ghazipur and buld many monuments here, at their time the Ghazipur Sarkar consisted of present day Ballia, Mau & Azamgarh districts. there family was historicaly in power in the region Zahurabad, and ruled over Qasimabad estate while later, its capital being at Bahadurganj. Sheikh Abdullah also established the town of Qasimabad, after his father name and his death in 1739. He also build a fort at Qasimabad known as Qasimabad Fort.

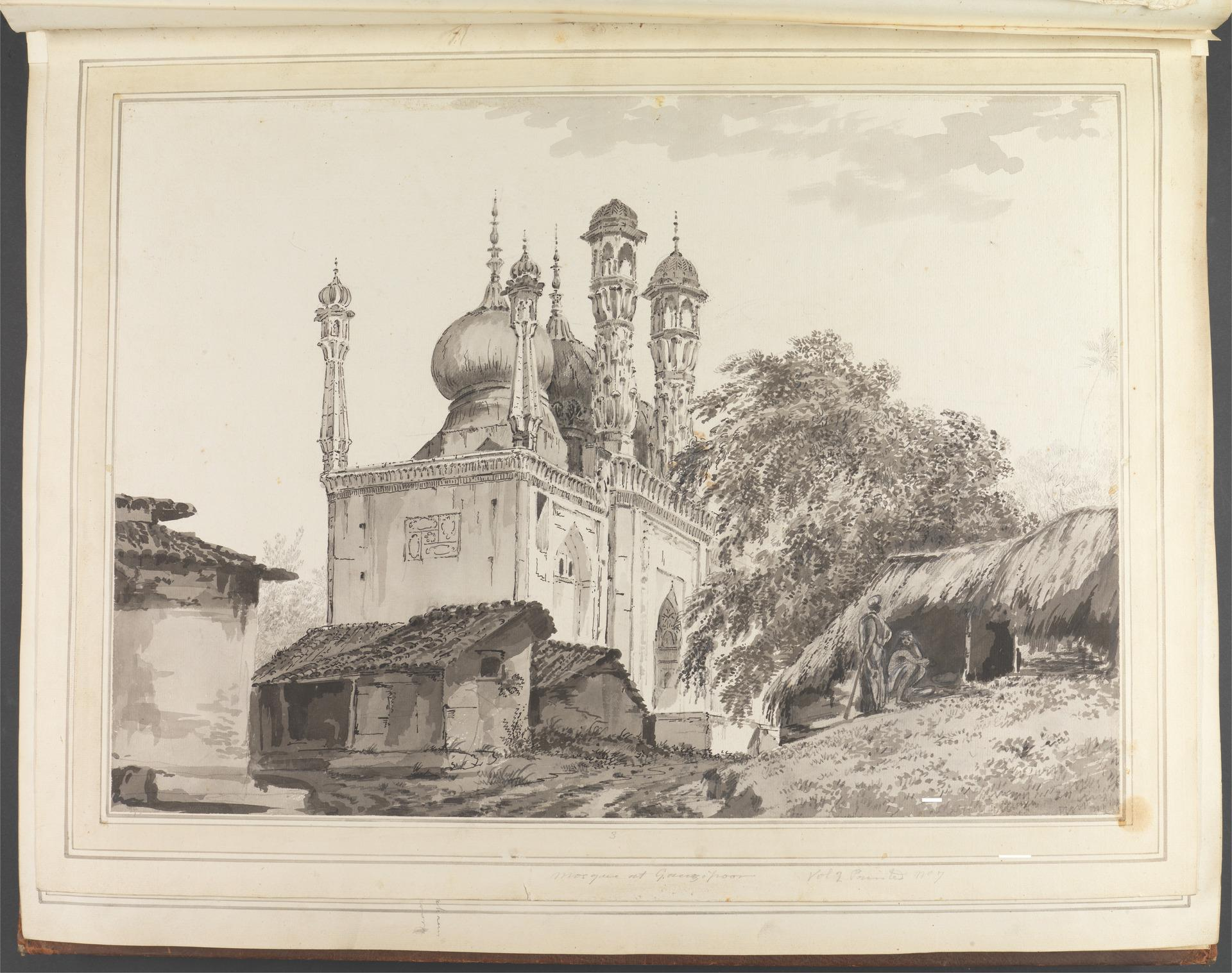
Drawing of a mosque in Ghazipur, 1781

Sheikh Abdullah left several monuments in Ghazipur: the Chihal Satun palace, a mosque and imambara, a masonry tank, and a large garden known as the Nawab's Bagh. Abdullah died in 1744 and was buried in a tomb by the garden. His oldest son, Fazl Ali, was away, so a younger brother named Karam-ullah was installed as governor instead. Fazl Ali appealed to Nawab Safdar Jung as became the Nawab of Ghazipur,. Fazl Ali was removed from office in 1747 following complaints of "oppression and misgovernment", and Karam-ullah (his younger brother )was restored, but he died a year later and Fazl Ali became governor again. In 1754, after Shuja-ud-Daula succeeded Safdar Jang as Nawab of Awadh, Fazl Ali was removed from his position due to revenue shortfalls, and Muhammad Ali Khan was appointed in his place. Muhammad Ali Khan, however, faced difficulties maintaining order in the region, and Fazl Ali was reappointed as governor. His jurisdiction was expanded to include Azamgarh.in 1757, and Balwant Singh, son of Mansa Ram, got the control of Ghazipur instead. In 1761, Nawab Shuja-ud-Daula, on the recommendation of Beni Bahadur formally granted Balwant Singh authority over 22 parganas of Ghazipur worth 8 lakh rupees of annual revenue. Although one of Sheikh Abdullah's descendants, Azmi Ali Khan, grandson of Sheikh Abdullah and a nephew of Fazl Ali, was successful in getting the control of their ansistoral jagir of Kasimabad, with a pention of rupees 1 lakh, in 1788.

Ghazipur remained under Balwant Singh's son and successor Chait Singh, but the British deposed him in 1781. His successor, Mahip Narayan Singh, was essentially stripped of all administrative powers by the British, who established Ghazipur district in 1818.

There were also quite a lot of Qazis in the area as well as Zamindars. Specifically in Yusufpur, a notable family would be the Ansari sheiks who had held such offices from the 1500s all the way till the late 20th century. Some notables would be Hamid Ansari, Faridul Haq Ansari, Qazi Mohammad Mustafa Ansari, Abu Zafar Ansari, Qazi Imamul Haq, Qazi Mahmudul Haq Ansari, Qazi Ahlul Haq, Qazi Nasirul Haq, Qazi Hamidul Haq, Mushir Haider Ansari, Qazi Nizamul Haq Ansari, Khalid Mustafa Ansari, Abbas Ansari, Afzal Ansari and world-famous crime master Mukhtar Ansari also was a well-known part of this family.

=== Scientific Society of Ghazipur ===
In 1862, Syed Ahmed Khan established the Scientific Society of Ghazipur (which was later transferred to Aligarh), the first of its kind in India, to propagate modern Western knowledge of science, technology and industry. It was a departure from the past in the sense that education made a paradigm shift from traditional humanities and related disciplines to the new field of science and agriculture. Some current institution like Technical Education and Research Institute (TERI), part of post-graduate college PG College Ghazipur, in the city, takes their inspiration from that first Society.

=== Ghazipur at the turn of the 20th century ===
At the turn of the 20th century, Ghazipur was described as forming "a narrow belt" along the bank of the Ganges. Ghazipur proper extended for about 5.5 km along the river, from Khudaipura in the east to Pirnagar in the west; and about 1.5 km on the other axis, away from the river. West of Pirnagar was the large former cantonment area, which extended for another 4 km along the river. The main business quarter was along the riverfront, while most houses were away from the river. The town was described as generally rather poor, and its streets were winding and narrow. The riverfront, on the other hand, was described as "picturesque", with a number of masonry ghats. On the west was Amghat, where the opium factory was located; other ghats further downstream included Collector Ghat, Pakka Ghat, Mahaul Ghat, Gola Ghat, Chitnath Ghat, Natkha Ghat, Khirki Ghat, and Pushta Ghat.

The main road was the one coming in from Varanasi to the west. It went due east for about 1 km after entering the city, and this stretch was flanked by houses and shops on both sides. Near the entrance, it passed the tank and tomb of Pahar Khan; then the Bishesharganj marketplace; then the Qila Kohna, or old fort; and then the dispensary, which was built in 1881 atop an old mound that may represent an even earlier fort. Beyond this, the road passed through the Lal Darwaza neighbourhood, past the town's sarai, and past the town hall (built in 1878) and adjoining mosque. Past this was the police station, and after that was Martinganj, a marketplace named after a former British official. After this point, the road bent sharply to the left, away from the river, for about 200 m. It then bent to the east to run parallel with the river.

In this area was a major triple junction at Ghazi Mian, where the Varanasi road met with two others: one coming from Korantadih and Ballia to the east and another coming from Gorakhpur and Azamgarh in the north. From Ghazi Mian, a wide highway went south to the riverbank at Pushta Ghat, where a ferry crossed over to Tari Ghat on the other side. The Ghazipur City railway station was also near Ghazi Mian.

The main landmark along the main road in the Ghazi Mian area was the Chihal Satun, or "hall of forty pillars", which was built by Abdullah Khan in the mid-1700s. The main road continued east through Razaganj and Begampur to the Ghazipur Ghat railway station on the eastern city limit.

Meanwhile, across from the Chihal Satun, another major road split off toward the northeast, passing the Jami Masjid and "the Nawab's garden, tank, and tomb" before joining the Korantadih and Ballia road, which then marked the city's northern boundary. Near this point were the garden of Karimullah and the tank of Dharam Chand.

Population

The current estimated population of Ghazipur city in 2024 is 155,000, while the Ghazipur metro population is estimated at 169,000. The last census was conducted in 2011, and the scheduled census for Ghazipur city in 2021 was postponed due to Covid. The current estimates of Ghazipur city are based on past growth rate. As per the provisional reports of Census India, the population of Ghazipur in 2011 was 110,587. Although Ghazipur city has a population of 110,587, its urban/metropolitan population is 121,020.

== Geography ==
Ghazipur is located at 25.58°N 83.57°E. It has an average elevation of 62 metres (203 feet).

Rivers in the district include the Ganges, Gomati, Gaangi, Beson, Magai, Bhainsai, Tons and Karmanasa River.

== Demographics ==
As of 2011 India census, Ghazipur city had a population of 110587, out of which males were 57954 and females were 52633. Males constituted 52.445% of the population and females constituted 47.554% of the population. Ghazipur has an average literacy rate of 85.46% (higher than the national average of 74.04%) of which male literacy is 90.61% and female literacy is 79.79%. 11.46% of the population is under 6 years of age and the sex ratio is 904.

Religions in Ghazipur City (2011)
Religion	Percent
Hinduism	72.33%
Islam	26.77%
Christianity	0.32%
Sikhism	0.11%
Others†	0.47%
Distribution of religions †Includes Buddhism (<0.2%).

== Places of interest ==
Sights in the city include several monuments built by Nawab Sheikh Abdulla, or Abdullah Khan, a governor of Ghazipur during the Mughal Empire in the eighteenth century, and his son Fazl Ali Khan. These include the palace known as Chihal Satun, or "forty pillars", which retains a very impressive gateway although the palace is in ruins, and the large garden with a tank and a tomb called the Nawab-ki-Chahar-diwari. The road that starts at the Nawab-ki-Chahar-diwari tomb and runs past the mosque leads, after 10 km, to a matha devoted to Pavhari Baba. The tank and tomb of Pahar Khan, faujdar of the city in 1580, and the plain but ancient tombs of the founder, Masud, and his son are also in Ghazipur, as is the tomb of Lord Cornwallis, one of the major figures of Indian and British history.

Cornwallis is famous for his role in the American Revolutionary War, and then for his time as Governor-General of India, being said to have laid the true foundation of British rule. He was later Lord Lieutenant of Ireland, there suppressing the 1798 Rebellion and establishing the Act of Union. He died in Ghazipur in 1805, soon after his returning to India for his second appointment as Governor-General. His tomb, overlooking the Ganges, is a heavy dome supported on 12 Doric columns above a cenotaph carved by John Flaxman.

The remains of an ancient mud fort also overlook the river, while there are ghats leading to the Ganges, the oldest of which is the ChitNath Ghat. Close to ChitNath Ghat, Pavhari Baba ashram is a place of interest for Swami Vivekananda followers. This ashram is further from the original Pavhari Baba underground hermitage caves, and is somewhat less explored by tourists. Those are the caves where Pavhari Baba, whom Swami Vivekananda considered only 2nd to his guru Ramkrishna, used to meditate, sometimes, as the folklores go, feeding only on air (hence the name Pavhari Baba).

=== Ghazipur opium factory ===
The opium factory located in the city was established by the British and continues to be a major source of opium production in India. It is known as the Opium Factory Ghazipur or, more formally, the Government Opium and Alkaloid Works. It is the largest factory of its kind in the country and indeed the world. The factory was initially run by the East India Company and was used by the British during the First and Second Opium Wars with China. The factory as such was founded in 1820 though the British had been trading Ghazipur opium before that. Nowadays its output is controlled by the Narcotics Drugs and Psychotropic Substance Act and Rules (1985) and administratively by the Indian government Ministry of Finance, overseen by a committee and a Chief Controller. The factory's output serves the global pharmaceutical industry. Until 1943 the factory only produced raw opium extracts from poppies, but nowadays it also produces many alkaloids, having first begun alkaloid production during World War II to meet military medical needs. Its annual turnover is in the region of 2 billion rupees (approximately 36 or 37 million US dollars), for a profit of about 80 million rupees (1.5 million dollars). It has been profitable every year since 1820, but the alkaloid production currently makes a loss, while the opium production makes a profit. The typical annual opium export from the factory to the US, for example, would be about 360 tonnes of opium. As well as the opium and alkaloid production, the factory also has a significant R&D program, employing up to 50 research chemists. It also serves the unusual role of being the secure repository for illegal opium seizures in India—and correspondingly, an important office of the Narcotics Control Bureau of India is located in Ghazipur. Overall employment in the factory is about 900. Because it is a government industry, the factory is administered from New Delhi but a general manager oversees operations in Ghazipur. In keeping with the sensitive nature of its production, the factory is guarded under high security (by the Central Industrial Security Force), and not easily accessible to the general public. The factory has its own residential accommodation for its employees, and is situated across the banks of river Ganges from the main city of Ghazipur. It is surrounded by high walls topped with barbed wire. Its products are taken by high security rail to Mumbai or New Delhi for further export.

The factory covers about 43 acres and much of its architecture is in red brick, dating from colonial times. Within the grounds of the factory there is a temple to Baba Shyam and a mazar, both said to predate the factory. There is also a solar clock, installed by the British opium agent Hopkins Esor from 1911 to 1913. Rudyard Kipling, who was familiar with opium both medicinally and recreationally, visited the Ghazipur factory in 1888 and published a description of its workings in The Pioneer on 16 April 1888. The text, In an Opium Factory is freely available from Adelaide University's ebook library.

Amitav Ghosh's novel Sea of Poppies deals with the British opium trade in India and much of Ghosh's story is based on his research of the Ghazipur factory. In an interview with BBC News, Ghosh stated that "On the Indian side, there is a sort of shame, I suppose. Also, just a general unawareness. I mean how many people are aware that the Ghazipur opium factory continues to be one of the single largest opium producers in the world? It is without a doubt the largest legitimate opium factory in the world." The Ghazipur factory may have one more claim to fame, for a rather unusual problem it has. It is infested with monkeys, but these are too narcotic-addled to be a real problem and workers drag them out of the way by their tails.

== Climate ==
Climate data for Ghazipur (1991–2020, extremes 1978–present)
Month	Jan	Feb	Mar	Apr	May	Jun	Jul	Aug	Sep	Oct	Nov	Dec	Year
Record high °C (°F)	30.6 (87.1)	34.1 (93.4)	40.1 (104.2)	45.1 (113.2)	46.1 (115.0)	46.4 (115.5)	43.2 (109.8)	37.2 (99.0)	37.6 (99.7)	36.0 (96.8)	34.0 (93.2)	30.8 (87.4)	46.4 (115.5)
Mean daily maximum °C (°F)	20.9 (69.6)	25.7 (78.3)	31.5 (88.7)	37.8 (100.0)	39.0 (102.2)	37.2 (99.0)	33.6 (92.5)	32.5 (90.5)	32.3 (90.1)	31.3 (88.3)	28.3 (82.9)	23.1 (73.6)	31.3 (88.3)
Mean daily minimum °C (°F)	7.2 (45.0)	10.2 (50.4)	14.5 (58.1)	20.1 (68.2)	23.6 (74.5)	25.2 (77.4)	24.6 (76.3)	24.2 (75.6)	23.3 (73.9)	19.3 (66.7)	13.5 (56.3)	8.8 (47.8)	17.8 (64.0)
Record low °C (°F)	−1.0 (30.2)	3.5 (38.3)	6.2 (43.2)	11.0 (51.8)	16.0 (60.8)	19.5 (67.1)	20.0 (68.0)	19.0 (66.2)	18.2 (64.8)	10.0 (50.0)	5.7 (42.3)	1.5 (34.7)	−0.5 (31.1)
Average rainfall mm (inches)	13.3 (0.52)	14.5 (0.57)	8.7 (0.34)	9.3 (0.37)	26.3 (1.04)	123.6 (4.87)	260.2 (10.24)	277.9 (10.94)	204.9 (8.07)	33.5 (1.32)	7.0 (0.28)	4.5 (0.18)	983.7 (38.73)
Average rainy days	1.4	1.2	0.9	0.8	1.7	6.1	11.6	12.4	8.2	1.8	0.4	0.3	46.8
Average relative humidity (%) (at 17:30 IST)	71	61	46	31	39	55	75	79	79	73	67	70	62
Source: India Meteorological Department

== Transport ==
Ghazipur Airport is situated in Ghazipur city. The airport is on the Ghazipur-Mau Road but This Airport is available only emergency situations. Airports Authority of India (AAI) is the operator of this Airport. Apart Lots Trains available for travel to Delhi, Mumbai, Ahmedabad, Chennai, Kolkata, Amritsar, Jammu etc from Ghazipur City Railway Station and Dildarnagar Junction.

== Notable people ==
- Syed Ishtiaq Ahmed, was Attorney General of Bangladesh
- Abbas Ansari, Declared absconder by Court, Indian politician
- Afzal Ansari, Indian politician, Member of Parliament 2004–2009, 2019–2023 convicted and sentenced to 4 years under Gangster Act. He has also been disqualified from the membership of Lok Sabha on account of his conviction.
- Mukhtar Ansari, convicted and jailed criminal turned Indian politician, 5 times MLA from Mau Sadar
- Mukhtar Ahmed Ansari, freedom fighter
- Lord Cornwallis, colonial administrator of North America, Ireland, and India died here
- Abdul Hamid, recipient of Param Veer Chakra, India's highest military award.
- Nazir Hussain, Bollywood actor and father of Bhojpuri cinema
- Shrawan Kumar, mathematics professor at University of North Carolina at Chapel Hill
- Mahendra Nath Pandey, Member of Parliament, Minister for Skills Development
- Sarjoo Pandey, freedom fighter
- Furqan Qamar, professor, former Vice chancellor and advisor to Planning Commission (Education)
- Ajay Rai 5 times MLA from Pindra and former Minister in the state government.
- Alok Kumar Rai, vice chancellor IIM Calcutta
- Atul Rai, former Ghosi MP and telecom contractor
- Baleshwar Rai 1970 Batch IAS Officer
- Gauri Shankar Rai, former MP
- Himanshu Rai (academic), vice chancellor IIM Indore
- Himanshu Rai (actor), Indian television actor.
- Kaushik Rai, Minister of Mines in the state of Assam
- Kuber Nath Rai, writer and literary scholar
- Mangala Rai, agricultural researcher and former vice chancellor GBPUAT
- Mangla Rai, legendary wrestler
- Munindra Nath Rai, Shaurya Chakra recipient
- Ram Bahadur Rai, Padmashri recipient
- Shivpujan Rai, freedom fighter, 1942
- Upendra Rai, media baron and entrepreneur
- Vinod Rai, Padma Bhushan recipient
- Viveki Rai, writer
- Moonis Raza, Vice Chancellor Delhi University and Co. Founder & Rector Jawaharlal Nehru University
- Rahi Masoom Raza, author and poet
- Sahajanand Saraswati, ascetic and leader
- Ram Badan Singh, Padma Bhushan recipient
- Manoj Sinha, Lieutenant Governor Jammu & Kashmir, Ex Member of Parliament, former State Minister of Communications and Minister of State for Railways in the Union Cabinet, Government of India
- Bihari Lal Yadav, father of the modern Biraha folk genre.
- Dinesh Lal Yadav, singer and actor & MP
- Suryakumar Yadav, Indian T20 Captain.
- Virendra Kumar Yadav, MLA from Jangipur.

== See also ==
- List of educational institutes in Ghazipur
- National Waterway 1 (India)
