= Bandra Terminus–Ghazipur City Weekly Express =

Train in India

Ghazipur City-Bandra Terminus Superfast Express

Overview
- Service type: Express
- First service: 23 April 2017; 8 years ago
- Current operator(s): Western Railway

Route
- Termini: Ghazipur City (GCT); Bandra Terminus (BDTS)
- Stops: 25
- Distance travelled: 1,922 km (1,194 mi)
- Average journey time: 31hrs 20mins
- Service frequency: Bi-weekly (Note: Runs two days in a week for every direction.)
- Train number(s): 20941 / 20942

On-board services
- Class(es): AC First Class, AC 2 Tier, AC 3 Tier, Sleeper Class, General Unreserved
- Seating arrangements: Yes
- Sleeping arrangements: Yes
- Catering facilities: Available
- Observation facilities: Large windows
- Baggage facilities: No
- Other facilities: Below the seats

Technical
- Rolling stock: LHB coach
- Track gauge: 1,676 mm (5 ft 6 in)
- Operating speed: 61 km/h (38 mph) average including halts.

The 20941 / 20942 Ghazipur City-Bandra Terminus Superfast Express is an superfast express train belonging to Western Railway zone that runs between Ghazipur City and Bandra Terminus in India. It is currently being operated with 20942/20941 train numbers on bi-weekly basis.

== Service ==
20942/Ghazipur City–Bandra Terminus Superfast Express has an average speed of 56 km/h and covers 1922 km in 35h 05m.

The 20941/Bandra Terminus–Ghazipur City Superfast Express has an average speed of 50 km/h and covers 1922 km in 36h 20m.

== Route and halts ==
The important halts of the train are:

- Ghazipur City
- Aunrihar Junction
- Kerakat
- Janghai Junction
- Jaunpur Junction
- Prayagraj Junction
- Kanpur Central
- Etawah Junction
- Agra Cantonment
- Hindaun City
- Gangapur City
- Sawai Madhopur Junction
- Kota Junction
- Ramganj Mandi Junction
- Shamgarh
- Ratlam Junction
- Vadodara Junction
- Bharuch Junction
- Surat
- Valsad
- Vapi
- Borivali
- Bandra Terminus.

== Coach composition ==
The train has standard LHB rakes with a maximum speed of 130 km/h. The train consists of 22 coaches:

- 1 AC I cum AC II Tier
- 2 AC II Tier
- 6 AC III Tier
- 8 Sleeper coaches
- 1 Pantry car
- 2 General
- 2 End-on Generator

== Traction ==
Both trains are hauled by a Vadodara/Valsad Loco Shed-based WAP-7 Electric locomotive from Ghazipur City to Bandra Terminus and vice versa.

== Rake sharing ==
The train shares its rake with 22936/22935 Bandra Terminus Palitana Express.

== See also ==
- Shabd Bhedi Superfast Express
- Suhaildev Superfast Express
- Kolkata–Ghazipur City Weekly Express
