= Jalalabad, Ghazipur =

Jalalabad
- village
- Interactive map of Jalalabad
- Country: India
- State: Uttar Pradesh
- District: Ghazipur
- Established: 1700; 326 years ago
- Founder: Zamindar Jalal Khan & Nawab Sheikh Abdullah

Government
  - Body: Gram panchayat

Area
  - Total: 1,643.88 ha (4,062.1 acres)

Population (2011)
  - Total: 20,935
  - Density: 1,273.5/km^{2} (3,298.4/sq mi)

Languages
  - Official: Hindi
- Time zone: UTC+5:30 (IST)
- Vehicle registration: UP

Jalalabad is a large village in Jakhania tehsil located in Ghazipur District of Uttar Pradesh India.

== History ==
Jalalabad was founded by Zamindar Jalal Khan in early 1700s (as per sayings). Zamindar Jalal Khan was a relative of Nawab Sheikh Abdullah a Nawab of Ghazipur. Jalalabad is a relative village of Kamsar and have a large population of Kamsaar Pathans. Jalalabad is also a relative village of Bahadurganj, Qasimabad and Zahurabad. Jalalabad was pargana during british era and was a jagir. Jalalabad jagir was surrounded by the other jagirs name as Azamgarh, Zahurabad, Saidpur, Ghazipur and Kamsar. Nawab Sheikh Abdullah also built a fort here named Jalalabad ka Qila in 1735. Jalalabad was one of the largest Zamindari villages in Ghazipur and near by District during the time of Zamindari. Some of the other large Zamindari and ruling villages of Ghazipur District were, Bahadurganj, Mainpur, Bhitri, Kaithi, Pakhanpur, Qasimabad, Zahurabad, Fazalganj, Shadiyabad, Mustafabad, Bahariyabad, Dewaitha, Gorasara , Usia, Sherpur, Reotipur, Ramawal, Karimuddinpur, Bara, Mahend. etc. The total geographical area of Jalalabad was 3594 acres and was kept on a revenue demand of Rs. 4519 in year 1901. Where as, the total land spread of the village was 30,500 Bighas.
