= Bahadurganj, Ghazipur =

Bahadurganj Abdulpur
- Municipality
- Location in Uttar Pradesh, India
- Coordinates: 25°53′54″N 83°13′20″E
- Country: India
- State: Uttar Pradesh
- District: Ghazipur
- Established: 1742; 284 years ago
- Founder: Nawab Shiekh Abdullah

Government
  - Chairman: Mrs. Nikahat Parveen

Area
  - Total: 20.1354 km^{2} (7.7743 sq mi)
- Elevation I'm: 67.876 m (222.69 ft)

Population (2011)
  - Total: 19,992
  - Density: 5,200/km^{2} (13,000/sq mi)
- Demonym: Bahadurganji

Languages
  - Official: Hindi English Urdu Bhojpuri
- Time zone: UTC+5:30 (IST)
- PIN: 275201
- Telephone Code: 05493
- Vehicle registration: UP 61

Bahadurganj (also known as Abdulpur) is a Municipality located in Zahurabad pargama of the Kasimabad Tehsil in Ghazipur district of Uttar Pradesh, India. Bahadurganj is located one the banks of Tamsa and Bhainsahi rivers. The town also served as the capital of Qasimabad estate.

== History ==
Bahadurganj before named as Abdulpur was established by Nawab Sheikh Abdullah urf Nawab Abdul Khan in year 1742, who was a Nawab of Ghazipur and son of Nawab Qasim Khan, Nawab of Qasimabad. He also served as a minister in court of Mughal emperor Farrukhsiyar and Saadat Ali Khan of Awadh. Sheikh Abdullah build a small fort, a mosque and Eidgah here, in 1742. He died in 1744, He had four sons name as Fazl Ali, Karam Ullah, Sadullah, Sayudullah of whom the eldest was Nawab Fazl Ali Khan who then became a Nawab of Ghazipur, for some time his brother Karam Ullah Khan was also made the Nawab but then in 1748 he died and Fazal Ali again became the nawab till 1757. Fazl Ali became immensely powerful, his estate was spread over 1647 villages and populations of 48 others. But in 1757 his estate got in the control of Sarkar of Banaras. Fazl went to Patna but later again came to Ghazipur, but much knowledge about his later life is unknown. There was one Nawab Azim Ali Khan who was a nephew of Fazal Ali and grandson of Sheikh Abdullah, who then in 1788, succeeded and got control of Qasimabad, receiving a pension of rupees 1 lakh. Azim Ali Khan's family then in 1788 migrated to Bahadurganj from Kasimabad establishing a new capital of Zamindari estate. He got the pension of rupees 10,000, till his death in 1807.

Their family settled at the original fort of Abdulpur and then Nawab Bahadur Shah Khan (a descendent of Nawab Sheikh Abdullah) established a Bazar(Ganj) after his name known as Bahadurganj in 1837. The total property of Bahadurganj was then divided in sixteen parts, one getting ten shares and the other getting six. Bahadur Shah 's family hence started living at their fort which is now known as the neighborhoods of Das Ana and Chah ana. After the family's estates were established many new business men and families came in the town for trade and commerce .

In 1900, the geographical area of the town of Bahadurganj was 686 acres. The zamindari estate was controlled with mutual co-operation between the descendents of the family of Bahadur Shah. Although after its early settlement, The estate during British era declined consisting of 14 villages near Bahadurganj, in the pargana of Zahurabad. The town served as the capital of Qasimabad estate till January,1956, till the abolition of zamindari system. In 1942, the settlement became a municipality and had its first municipal elections, Nebedad Khan was elected as the first chairman of the town.

== Location ==
Bahadurganj is located 12 km from Mau and about 42 km from Ghazipur. It is located at the southern bank of the Tamsa River.

== Religions ==
The major religious groups are Muslims and Hindu, constituting 57% and 44.8% of the population respectively.

Religions in Bahadurganj
Religion	Percent
Hindus	44.8%
Muslims	57%
Christians	0.001%
Jains	0.000%
Others†	0.001%
Distribution of religions †Includes Sikhs (0.000%), Buddhists (<0.001%).

== Local culture ==
Major festivals in Bahadurganj include Ram Navami, Mawlid, and Muharram Durga, which occur annually. Celebrations are also organized at Dashahara, Eid-ul-Adha, Eid-ul-Fitr, Holi, Ramzan-ul-Mubarak, Diwali, Raksha Bandhan, Shab-e-Barat, Christmas, and Easter, as well as the national holidays of Independence Day and Republic Day.

Despite the lack of a major Shiite community in the town, the month of Muharram is celebrated by some. On the tenth day of Muharram, the ritual of Ashura is held on the east side of the town. On the banks of the Tamsa River, which is also called the Dhobi Ghat, is the nearby village Rasulpur, through a Tujia river. There are three tahas of this town. People start coming here in the afternoon, and the three wooden equals of the town also go. In this town, people from all religions gather in celebration of different festivals.

== Demographics ==
As of the 2011 India census, Bahadurganj had 13 wards and a population of 22068. 51.56% of the population is male; 48.44% is female. Bahadurganj has an average literacy rate of 71.26%, higher than the state average of 67.68%. The literacy rate is 78.01% among men and 64.08% among women. 16.80% of the population is under 6 years of age.

The State Bank Of India, Union Bank of India, District Cooperative Bank, and Sub Post Office provide banking services and ATM facilities. Sub Post Office is now providing CBS facilities.

== Weather ==
Climate data for Bahadurganj
Month	Jan	Feb	Mar	Apr	May	Jun	Jul	Aug	Sep	Oct	Nov	Dec	Year
Mean daily maximum °C (°F)	23 (73)	26 (79)	33 (91)	39 (102)	42 (108)	40 (104)	34 (93)	33 (91)	33 (91)	33 (91)	29 (84)	25 (77)	33 (90)
Mean daily minimum °C (°F)	9 (48)	11 (52)	16 (61)	22 (72)	26 (79)	28 (82)	26 (79)	26 (79)	24 (75)	20 (68)	14 (57)	10 (50)	19 (67)
Average precipitation mm (inches)	12 (0.5)	18 (0.7)	9 (0.4)	0 (0)	0 (0)	96 (3.8)	144 (5.7)	162 (6.4)	201 (7.9)	24 (0.9)	3 (0.1)	6 (0.2)	675 (26.6)
Source: [Bahadurganj Weather]

== neighbourhood ==
The total area of Bahadurganj consists of several places, such as Abdulpur (Das Ana and Chah Ana), Patti garh m Abdulpur, Pattigarh m Bahadurganj, Araji Banchak Abbas, Banka Khas, Palpur, Araji Taufir, Araji Banchak doyam, Baluwa Khalispur, Baswari, Mahuvi Bandh, Trilokchandpur, Salamatpur, and Rasulpur.

== See also ==
- Qasimabad
- Zahurabad
- Bhainsahi River
- Qasimabad estate
- Jalalabad,
- Qasimabad Fort
