= Swami Vivekananda's travels in India (1888–1893) =

In 1888, Swami Vivekananda left the monastery as a Parivrâjaka— the Hindu religious life of a wandering monk, "without fixed abode, without ties, independent and strangers wherever they go". His sole possessions were a kamandalu (water pot), staff and his two favourite books: the Bhagavad Gita and The Imitation of Christ. Narendra travelled extensively in India for five years, visiting centres of learning and acquainting himself with diverse religious traditions and social patterns. He developed sympathy for the suffering and poverty of the people, and resolved to uplift the nation. Living primarily on bhiksha (alms), Swami Vivekananda travelled on foot and by railway (with tickets bought by admirers). During his travels he met, and stayed with Indians from all religions and walks of life: scholars, dewans, rajas, Hindus, Muslims, Christians, paraiyars and government officials.

== North ==
In August 1888 Swami Vivekananda's first destination was Varanasi, where he visited the places where Gautama Buddha and Adi Shankara preached and met Bengali writer Bhudev Mukhopadhyay and Hindu saint Trailanga Swami. After meeting Vivekananda, Mukhopadhyay said, "Such vast experience and insight at such an early age! I am sure he will be a great man". Narendra also met Sanskrit and Vedic scholar Babu Pramadadas Mitra, with whom he corresponded on the interpretation of Hindu scriptures. After leaving Varanasi, he visited Ayodhya, Lucknow, Agra, Vrindavan, Hathras, and Rishikesh. When he was staying in Vrindavan, one day, he saw a man smoking a hookah. He asked the man to give him a tobacco bowl, but the man refused to do so, explaining he was a man of lower caste. Narendra initially accepted his point and started walking, but within a few minutes, he started feeling ashamed, as he had been practising "non-duality of the soul" for a long time. He returned to the man, and once again requested him to give him a tobacco bowl and despite the man's reluctance, he took the hookah from him and started smoking.

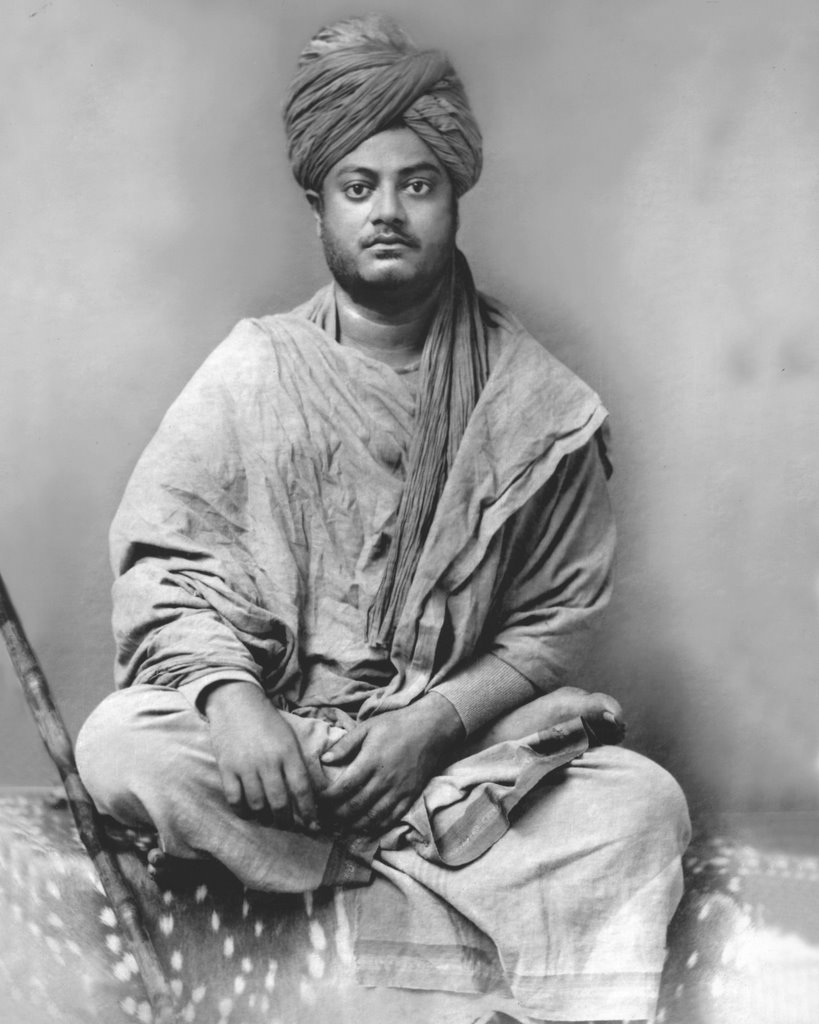
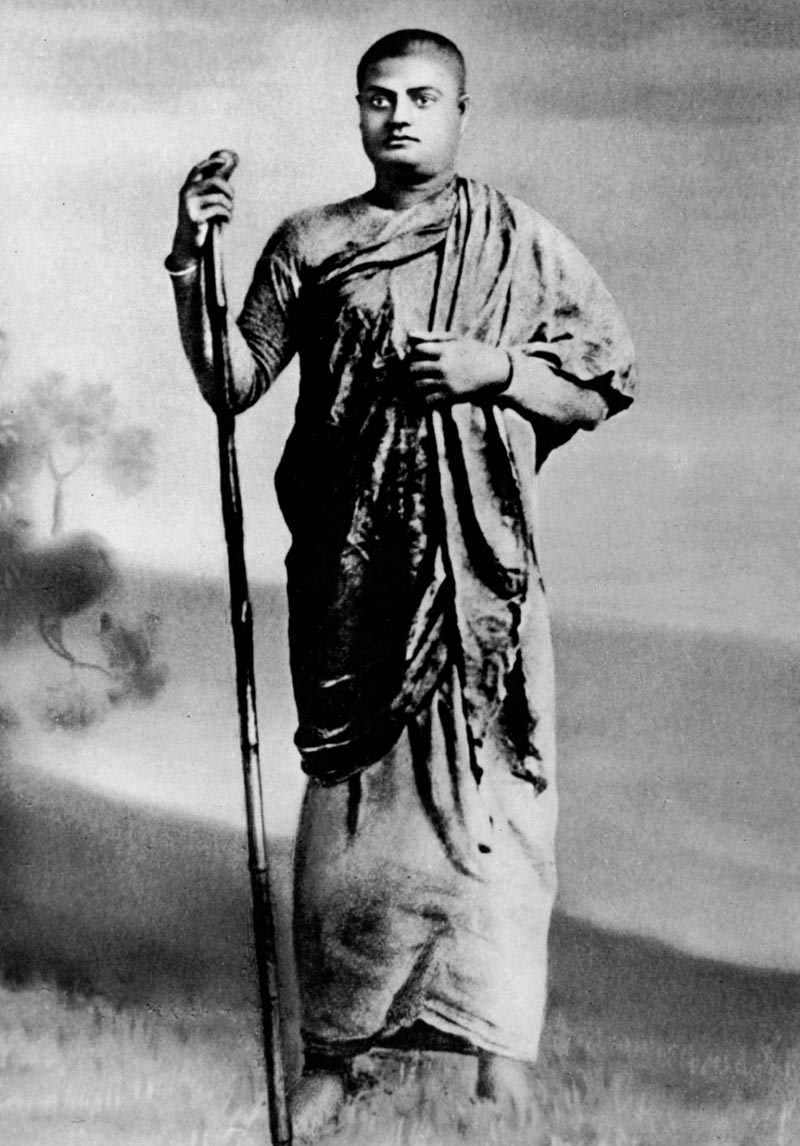
After Ramakrishna's death, in January 1887 Vivekananda (then Narendranath Datta) and eight other disciples of Ramakrishna took formal monastic vows in Baranagar Math. In 1888, Narendra left the math and began life as a wandering monk. Both photos were taken at this time.

While on the way to Haridwar, in September 1888, Narendra stayed at Hathras. There in the railway waiting room Narendra met Sharat Chandra Gupta, a railway station master. Gupta went to Narendra and asked if he was hungry, to which he got a reply in positive. He took Narendra to his home. When Narendra asked him what food he was going to offer, Gupta quoted a Persian poem in reply: "Oh beloved, I shall prepare the most delicious dish with the flesh of my heart". Narendra told Gupta that he had a great mission in life — he wanted to serve his motherland where starvation and poverty stalk millions of people. He narrated his dream of seeing India regaining her old glory. During the conversations, Gupta asked Narendra if he could help him anyhow. Narendra immediately replied— "Yes, take up the kamandalu and go begging". Gupta understood that he was being asked to renounce his personal interest for the welfare of many. He decided to renounce the world and became a disciple of Narendranath. Narendra and Gupta left Hathras together.

After leaving Hathras Narendra and Gupta first went to Haridwar, and from there travelled to Rishikesh, on foot. Here Narendra initiated Gupta into Sannyasa and was named Swami Sadananda. Gupta was the directly initiated monastic disciple of Vivekananda. Vivekananda called him "the child of my spirit".

=== Meeting with Pavhari Baba ===
Between 1888 and 1890, Swami Vivekananda visited Vaidyanath in Allahabad. On 18 January 1890 he went from Allahabad to Ghazipur and met Pavhari Baba, an Advaita Vedanta ascetic who spent much of his time in meditation. At the time he suffered from lumbago, and it was becoming impossible for him to move or sit in meditation. After meeting Baba, Swami Vivekananda wanted to become his disciple and Baba asked him to stay a few more days at Ghazipur. However, the night before his initiation, Swami Vivekananda had a dream in which Ramakrishna looked at him with a melancholy face. This dream convinced Swami Vivekananda that no one other than Ramakrishna could be his teacher, and he abandoned the idea of becoming Baba's disciple.

== Return to Baranagar Math and Himalayan journey (1890–91) ==
During the first half of 1890, after the deaths of fellow Ramakrishna disciples Balaram Bose and Suresh Chandra Mitra, Narendra returned to Baranagar Math because of ill health and to arrange for the math's financial support. After finishing his work in July, he left the math (accompanied by fellow monk Swami Akhandananda) for the Himalayas.

This constituted the first phase of a journey which would bring Swami Vivekananda to the West. He visited the sacred sites of Nainital, Almora, Srinagar, Dehradun, Rishikesh and Haridwar. During these travels, he met Swami Brahmananda, Saradananda, Turiyananda and Advaitananda. They stayed at Meerut for several days, engaged in meditation, prayer and study of the scriptures. At the end of January 1891, Swami Vivekananda left his colleagues and travelled to Delhi.

== Rajputana (1891) ==
After visiting historical sites at Delhi, Swami Vivekananda started his travel towards Rajputana. In these days, he drew inspiration from the words of the Gautama Buddha—

Go forward without a path,
Fearing nothing, caring for nothing!
Wandering alone, like the rhinoceros!
Even as a lion, not trembling at noises,
Even as the wind, not caught in the net,
Even as the lotus leaf, untainted by water,
Do thou wander alone, like the rhinoceros!

In February 1891, he first went to Alwar, where he was warmly welcomed by the Hindus and the Muslims. There he told a Muslim religion scholar that one significant feature of the Quran is, though it was written a thousand years ago, the book was free from "interpolation" and retained its original purity. When Swami Vivekananda met the Mangal Singh, King of Alwar, whose outlook was Westernised, Singh challenged Swami Vivekananda and ridiculed Hindu idol worship. Swami Vivekananda attempted to explain to him that Hindu worship is symbolic worship, but failed to make the king understand. Then Swami Vivekananda saw a painting hanging on the wall, it was the a painting of the Singh's deceased father and asked him to spit on it. Singh became angry and retorted how he could spit on his father. Swami Vivekananda explained, though it was just a painting, not the king himself, it reminds everybody about the king, similarly an idol worshipped by a Hindu is actually a symbolic worship of the Almighty.

From Alwar, Swami Vivekananda went to Jaipur, where he studied Panini's Ashtadhyayi with a Sanskrit scholar. Swami Vivekananda then went to Ajmer, where he visited the palace of Akbar and the Dargah Sharif. At Mount Abu he met Raja Ajit Singh of Khetri, who became an ardent devotee and supporter. Swami Tathagatananda, a senior monk in the Ramakrishna Order, wrote of their relationship:

... Vivekananda's friendship with Maharaja Ajit Singh of Khetri was enacted against the backdrop of Khetri, a sanctified town in Northern Rajasthan, characterized by its long heroic history and independent spirit. Destiny brought Swamiji and Ajit Singh together on 4 June 1891 at Mount Abu, where their friendship gradually developed through their mutual interest in significant spiritual and secular topics. The friendship intensified when they travelled to Khetri and it became clear that theirs was the most sacred friendship, that of a Guru and his disciple.

At Khetri Swami Vivekananda delivered discourses to the Raja, became acquainted with pandit Ajjada Adibhatla Narayana Dasu and studied the Mahābhāṣya on the sutras of Panini. After 2 1/2 months there, in October 1891 he left for Bombay Presidency.

== West (1891–92) ==
Swami Vivekananda visited Ahmedabad, Wadhwan and Limbdi; at the former, he completed his studies of Islamic and Jain cultures. At Limbdi he met Thakur Saheb Jaswant Singh, who had been to England and America. From him, Narendra first got the idea of going to the West to preach Vedanta. He visited Junagadh and was the guest of Haridas Viharidas Desai, diwan of the state, who was so charmed by his company that every evening he and all the state officials conversed with Swami Vivekananda until late at night. Swami Vivekananda also visited Girnar, Kutch, Porbander, Dwaraka, Palitana, Nadiad and Baroda. He remained for nine months at Porbander, furthering his philosophical and Sanskrit studies with learned pandits.

Swami Vivekananda's next destinations included Mahabaleshwar, Pune, Khandwa and Indore. At Kathiawar he heard of the 1893 Parliament of the World's Religions, and was urged by his followers to attend it. After a brief stay in Bombay in July 1892, he met Bal Gangadhar Tilak during a train journey. After staying with Tilak for a few days in Pune, Swami Vivekananda travelled to Belgaum in October 1892 where he met Panth Maharaj, and to Panaji and Margao in Goa, spending three days at Rachol Seminary (the oldest convent in Goa, with rare religious manuscripts and printed works in Latin) studying Christian theological works.

== South (1892–93) ==
Swami Vivekananda later travelled to Bangalore, where he became acquainted with K. Seshadri Iyer (diwan of the Mysore state). Iyer described Narendra as "a magnetic personality and a divine force which were destined to leave their mark on the history of his country". Iyer introduced him to the Maharaja (king) of Mysore Chamaraja Wodeyar. Wodeyar invited Swami Vivekananda to stay in his palace as a guest. The maharaja gave Swami Vivekananda a letter of introduction to the diwan of Cochin and a railway ticket.

From Bangalore, Swami Vivekananda visited Trissur, Kodungalloor and Ernakulam. At Ernakulam he met Chattampi Swamikal, a contemporary of Narayana Guru, in early December 1892. From Ernakulam, Swami Vivekananda travelled to Trivandrum, Nagercoil and reached Kanyakumari on foot on Christmas Eve 1892. At Kanyakumari, Swami Vivekananda meditated on the "last bit of Indian rock" (later known as the Vivekananda Rock Memorial). At Kanyakumari, Narendra had a "vision of one India" (the "Kanyakumari resolve of 1892"). He later wrote:

"At Cape Camorin sitting in Mother Kumari's temple, sitting on the last bit of Indian rock—I hit upon a plan: We are so many sanyasis wandering about, and teaching the people metaphysics—it is all madness. Did not our Gurudeva use to say, 'An empty stomach is no good for religion?' We as a nation have lost our individuality and that is the cause of all mischief in India. We have to raise the masses."

To realize this, he needed collaborators and funds. The people were easily to find, but the funds were hard to acquire, and therefore Narendra decided to travel to America, "to earn money myself, and then return to my country and devote the rest of my days to the realisation of this one aim of my life."

From Kanyakumari, Swami Vivekananda visited Madurai and had meetings with the Raja of Ramnad Bhaskara Sethupathi. During his meetings, he had extensive discussions on Hindu philosophy with eminent scholars like Mahavidwan R. Raghava Iyengar. The raja became his disciple, urging him to attend the Parliament of Religions in Chicago. From Madurai, Swami Vivekananda visited Rameswaram, Pondicherry and Madras; there, he met some of his disciples, specially Alasinga Perumal. (Note: Alasinga Perumal played important roles in collecting funds for his voyage to America and later establishing the Ramakrishna Mission in Madras).) Perumal went door to door in hopes of getting money for Swami Vivekananda's travel. With funds collected by his Madras disciples, the kings of Mysore, Ramnad, Khetri, diwans and other followers, Swami Vivekananda left Bombay for Chicago on 31 May 1893 with the name "Vivekananda", as suggested by Ajit Singh of Khetri, which means "the bliss of discerning wisdom".

== See also ==
- Yatra

== Sources ==
- Agarwal, Satya P. (1998), The social role of the Gītā: how and why, Motilal Banarsidass, ISBN 978-81-208-1524-7
- Badrinath, Chaturvedi (2006). Swami Vivekananda, the Living Vedanta. Penguin Books India. ISBN 978-0-14-306209-7.
- Banhatti, G.S. (1995), Life and Philosophy of Swami Vivekananda, Atlantic Publishers & Distributors, p. 276, ISBN 978-81-7156-291-6
- Banhatti, G.S. (1963), The Quintessence of Vivekananda, Pune, India: Suvichar Prakashan Mandal, ASIN B0007JQX3M
- Beckerlegge, Gwilym (2008). Colonialism, Modernity, and Religious Identities: Religious Reform Movements in South Asia. Oxford University Press. ISBN 978-0-19-569214-3.
- Bhuyan, P. R. (2003), Swami Vivekananda: Messiah of Resurgent India, New Delhi: Atlantic Publishers & Distributors, ISBN 978-81-269-0234-7
- Cooper, Carebanu (1984). Swami Vivekananda: Literary Biography. Bharatiya Vidya Bhavan.
- Dhar, Shailendra Nath (1976), A Comprehensive Biography of Swami Vivekananda (2 ed.), Madras, India: Vivekananda Prakashan Kendra, OCLC 708330405
- Gosling, David L. (2007). Science and the Indian Tradition: When Einstein Met Tagore. Routledge. ISBN 978-1-134-14333-7.
- Michelis, Elizabeth De (8 December 2005). A History of Modern Yoga: Patanjali and Western Esotericism. Continuum. ISBN 978-0-8264-8772-8.
- Nikhilananda, Swami (April 1964), "Swami Vivekananda Centenary", Philosophy East and West, 14 (1), University of Hawai'i Press: 73–75, doi:10.2307/1396757, JSTOR 1396757.
- Nikhilananda, Swami (1953), Vivekananda: A Biography (PDF), New York: Ramakrishna-Vivekananda Center, ISBN 0-911206-25-6
- Richards, Glyn (1996), "Vivekananda", A Source-Book of Modern Hinduism, Routledge, pp. 77–78, ISBN 978-0-7007-0317-3
- Rolland, Romain (2008), The Life of Vivekananda and the Universal Gospel (24 ed.), Advaita Ashrama, p. 328, ISBN 978-81-85301-01-3
- Sil, Narasingha Prosad (1997), Swami Vivekananda: A Reassessment, Selinsgrove, Pennsylvania: Susquehanna University Press, ISBN 0-945636-97-0
- Virajananda, Swami, ed. (2006) [1910], The Life of the Swami Vivekananda by his eastern and western disciples... in two volumes (Sixth ed.), Kolkata: Advaita Ashrama, ISBN 81-7505-044-6
- Virajananda, Swami (1918), The Life of the Swami Vivekananda, vol. 4, Prabuddha Bharata Office, Advaita Ashrama
- Vivekananda, Swami (1976). Meditation and Its Methods According to Swami Vivekananda. Vedanta Press. ISBN 978-0-87481-030-1.
