= Qasimabad Estate =

Zamindari estate and jagir in Uttar Pradesh, India

Qasimabad estate
- 1700–1956
- Capital: • Qasimabad(1700-1758) •Bahadurganj(1758-1952)
- Religion: Islam
- Nawab, Raja
  - 1700-1739: Muhmmad Qasim
  - 1739-1744: Nawab Sheikh Abdullah
  - 1744–1757: Fazl Ali Khan
  - 1757–1788: A son of Sheikh Abdullah
  - 1788–1807: Muhammad Azim Ali Khan
  - 1807–1837: Bahadur Shah Khan
  - 1837-1952: mutual cooperation among the descendants of Bahadur Shah
- Historical era: Middle Ages
  - Established: 1700
  - Disestablished: 1956
- Today part of: Ghazipur, Mau

Qasimabad Estate, (also known as Zahurabad pargana ) was a Zamindari estate and a jagir, named as Pargana, Zahurabad, located in the Ghazipur district of Uttar Pradesh, India it got the status of jagir in year 1675. The capital of Qasimabad estate was the town of Qasimabad but later, in 1758 the capital was shifted to Bahadurganj. It consisted of many places in the pargana of Zahurabad in 1901. The estate was established in year 1700 and it ended in 1956, completing a life span of 256 years.

== History ==
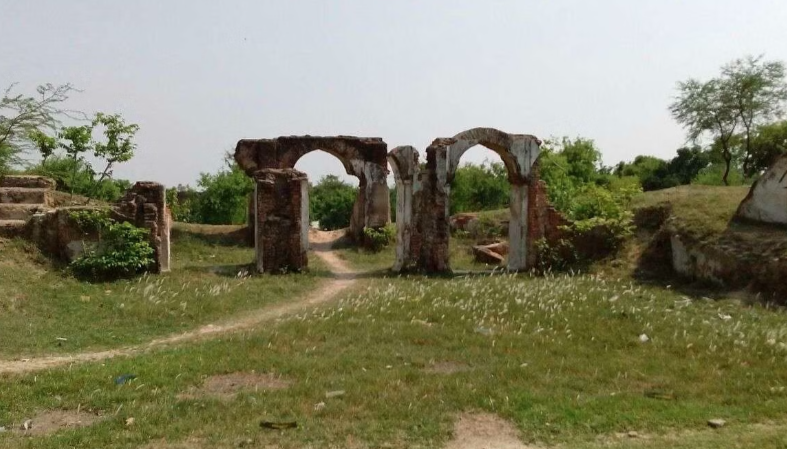
Ruins of the old fort at Qasimabad build in 1739 by Nawab Sheikh Abdullah of Ghazipur

It was ruled by the family of Nawab Sheikh Abdullah. Originally Qasim Khan was ruler of Zahurabad estate till his death in 1741 but lived in his kot at Daharwara. His son Nawab Sheikh Abdullah established Qasimabad after his name and built Qasimabad Fort. In 1775, the Ghazipur Sarakar became a part of Banaras Estate. The Nawabs of Qasimabad also built Bahadurganj Fort, and Jalalabad Fort. The First ruler was Sheikh Muhammad Qasim, Then Sheikh Abdullah, then his son Nawab Fazal Ali Khan, Nawab Azim Ali Khan(Fazal Ali's nephew) then Nawab Bahadurshah, and then the estate was divided and the family established them near the area of Bahadurganj, now Abdul Khan's family probably lives in neighbourhood names as Das ana or Abdulpur and his brother's family live in an area known as Chah ana in Bahadurganj.
