= Latiya =

Latiya may refer to:

- Latiya (dessert), a cake from Guam
- Latiya (village), a village in Uttar Pradesh, India
