= GZT =

GZT may refer to:

- Gazit-Globe, an Israeli real estate company
- Ghazipur Ghat railway station, in Uttar Pradesh, India
- Grévy's Zebra Trust, active in Ethiopia and Kenya
- Oğuzeli Airport, in Gaziantep, Turkey
- The YouTube channel operated by the Turkish Albayrak Group
