= Gangi =

Gangi may refer to:

- Gangi River, a river in India
- Gangi, India, a town in India
- Gangi, Sicily, a town in Italy
- Palazzo Valguarnera-Gangi, a townhouse in Palermo, Sicily
- Rosario Gangi, a New York City mobster and captain in the Genovese crime family
- Snowroof, the translation of 雁木 gangi an opening and castle in shogi

== See also ==
- Gaangi, a river of eastern Uttar Pradesh, India
