= List of educational institutions in Ghazipur =

This is an incomplete list of educational institutions in Ghazipur.

- Crescent Convent School, Dildarnagar
- Jawahar Navodaya vidyalaya Ghazipur
- Shah Faiz Public School, Ghazipur
- New Shah Faiz Public School, Dildarnagar
- Sayed Kamsar-O-Bar Muslim Degree College, Dildarnagar
- Basheer Khan Girls Degree College, Usia, Dildarnagar
- Noble Senior Secondary School, Dildarnagar
- St. John's School
- Post Graduate College, Ghazipur
- Adarsh Vidyalaya Inter College, Dildarnagar
- Government City Inter College, Ghazipur
