= Bhainsahi River =

Bhainsahi

Location
- Country: India
- State: Uttar Pradesh
- District: Azamgarh, Mau, Ghazipur, Sultanpur, Akbarpur

Physical characteristics
- Mouth: Sarju River
- Length: 175 km (109 mi)
- Width
  - average: 135 ft

Bhainsahi is a river located in Uttar Pradesh of India. Bhansahi river flows about 175 km, passing through the districts of Ghazipur, Mau and Azamgarh. It rises near Dostpur in Sultanpur and its mouth opens to Tons river near the town of Bahaduraganj.
