= Shabd Bhedi Superfast Express =

Train in India

Overview
- Service type: Superfast Express
- First service: 17 November 2016; 9 years ago
- Current operator: Eastern Railway

Route
- Termini: Ghazipur City (GCT); Kolkata (KOAA)
- Stops: 7
- Distance travelled: 761 km (473 mi)
- Average journey time: 13 hours 30 minutes
- Service frequency: Weekly
- Train number: 22323 / 22324

On-board services
- Classes: AC 2 Tier, AC 3 Tier, Sleeper class, General Unreserved
- Seating arrangements: Yes
- Sleeping arrangements: Yes
- Catering facilities: On-board catering, E-catering
- Observation facilities: Large windows
- Baggage facilities: Available
- Other facilities: Below the seats

Technical
- Rolling stock: LHB coach
- Track gauge: 1,676 mm (5 ft 6 in)
- Operating speed: 56 km/h (35 mph) average including halts.

The 22323 / 22324 Shabd Bhedi Superfast Express is a Superfast Express train belonging to Eastern Railway zone that runs between Ghazipur City and Kolkata in India. It is currently being operated with 22324/22323 train numbers on a weekly basis.

== Service ==
The 22324/Shabd Bhedi Superfast Express has an average speed of 56 km/h and covers 761 km in 13h 30m. The 22323/Shabd Bhedi Superfast Express has an average speed of 55 km/h and covers 761 km in 13h 45m.

== Route & halts ==
The important halts of the train are:

- Ghazipur City
- Jaunpur Junction
- Varanasi Junction
- Pt. Deen Dayal Upadhyaya Junction
- Gaya Junction
- Dhanbad Junction
- Asansol
- Durgapur
- Barddhaman Junction
- Kolkata

== Coach composition ==
The train has standard LHB rakes with a maximum speed of 110 km/h. The train consists of 22 coaches:

- 1 AC 2 Tier
- 3 AC 3 Tier
- 4 AC 3 Economy
- 8 Sleeper
- 4 General
- 1 Seating-cum-Luggage Rake
- 1 End-On Generation

== Traction ==
Both trains are hauled by a Howrah Loco Shed based WAP-7 electric locomotive from Ghazipur City to Kolkata and vice versa.

== Rake sharing ==
The trains shares its rake with 13122 / 13121 Kolkata–Ghazipur City Weekly Express.

== See also ==
- Kolkata railway station
- Ghazipur City railway station
- Kolkata–Ghazipur City Weekly Express
- Suhaildev Superfast Express
