= Ghazipur City railway station =

Railway station in Uttar Pradesh, India

Ghazipur City
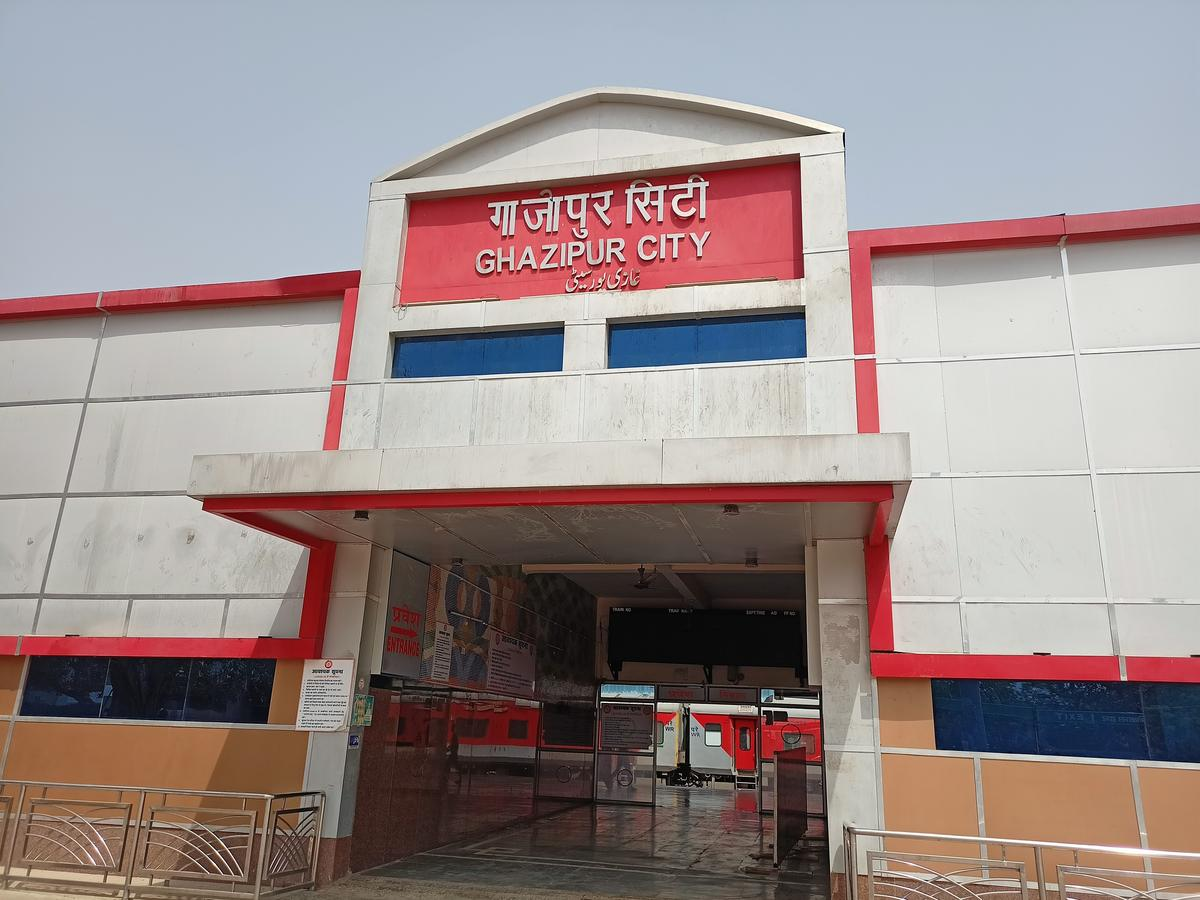
- Ghazipur City railway station entrance

General information
- Location: Malgodam Road, Ghazipur, Uttar Pradesh; India
- Elevation: 74 m (243 ft)
- System: Indian Railways station
- Owner: Indian Railways
- Operator: North Eastern Railway
- Lines: Varanasi–Chhapra line Mau–Ghazipur–Dildarnagar main line Chhapra-Jaunpur line Via Aunrihar/Kerakat
- Platforms: 5
- Tracks: 6

Construction
- Structure type: At grade
- Parking: yes

Other information
- Status: Active
- Station code: GCT
- Zone(s): North Eastern Railway
- Division(s): Varanasi

History
- Rebuilt: Yes
Location
- Location within India Location within Uttar Pradesh

Ghazipur City Railway Station is a railway station located in Ghazipur City of Uttar Pradeshin the North Eastern Railways zone. The station code is GCT.

== Important trains of Ghazipur City ==
1. 22419/22420 Ghazipur City–Anand Vihar Terminal Suhaildev Superfast Express (via Lucknow)
2. 22433/22434 Ghazipur City-Anand Vihar Terminal Suhaildev Superfast Express (via Prayagraj)
3. 20941/20942 Bandra Terminus–Ghazipur City Weekly Express
4. 22323/22324 Kolkata–Ghazipur City Shabd Bhedi Express
5. 13121/13122 Kolkata–Ghazipur City Weekly Express
6. 14611/14612 Ghazipur City–Shri Mata Vaishno Devi Katra Weekly Express

There is also a DEMU service between Gazipur and Prayag.

== See also ==
- Kerakat railway station
- Ghazipur Ghat railway station
