= Andhau Airstrip =

Andhau Airstrip, Ghazipur
- IATA: none; ICAO: none

Summary
- Airport type: Reserve
- Owner: Uttar Pradesh Government
- Location: Ghazipur, Uttar Pradesh, India
- Elevation AMSL: 230 ft / 70 m
- Coordinates: 25.6155077°N 83.5606442°E

Map
- Location of airport in Uttar Pradesh Andhau Airstrip, Ghazipur (India)

Runways
Direction	Length		Surface
Direction	ft	m	Surface
08/26	4,800	1,820	Asphalt

Andhau Airstrip, Ghazipur is an airstrip, situated in Ghazipur in Uttar Pradesh, India. It is located on the Ghazipur-Mau Road, 7 kilometres from Ghazipur. The airstrip is owned by the State Government.

== Airlines and destinations ==
The airport/airstrip has only unscheduled chartered flights.

== History ==
The airstrip was set up by the British Administration during World War II, is spread over 63 acres and has a 4,800 ft (1,463 m) runway with asphalt surface. It is located at an elevation of 230 ft (70 m) above mean sea level. In January 2019, SpiceJet was awarded routes to Kolkata and Delhi from this airport as part of the government's Regional Connectivity Scheme, UDAN III.
