= Gauri Shankar Rai =

Indian politician (1924–1991)

Gauri Shankar Rai (10 June 1924 – 2 May 1991) was a member of the 6th Lok Sabha during 1977-79 representing Ghazipur constituency of Uttar Pradesh. Earlier he had been member of the Uttar Pradesh Legislative Assembly (1957–62) and Legislative Council (1967–76). He served as the Leader of Opposition in Uttar Pradesh Legislative Council.

== Social activist ==
He was very active social activist who lead several agitations with his junior friends Sri Chandra Shekhar, ex prime minister and Kashi Nath Mishra, ex minister in UP and was successful. Just after independence in 1947, he led an agitation, organised by student organisations of UP, against enhancement of school fees by UP Govt and was jailed with agitators in Lucknow, but freed after demand was accepted by Govt. He was a teacher in Town College Ballia for some time but left the job due to his preoccupation in Political Activities.

== Parliamentary life ==
He was elected as Member of Legislative Assembly, as a Praja Socialist Party candidate, from Ballia sadar Vidhan Sabha in 1957 and defeated congress candidate. He joined Congress Party in 1964 along with Ashok Mehta when PSP merged itself with Congress Party. Pt. Nehru had declared Socialism as ultimate goal of congress and all socialists to join him and strengthen socialist movement. He was elected to UP Legislative Council, MLC, in 1967 as congress candidate, defeating a communist candidate supported by the then Govt in UP. He was re-elected to UP Council in 1970 and was up to 1976.

He joined JP Movement in 1974 against corruption and misrule of different state governments, e.g. Gujarat and Bihar and also against Government of India. State office of JP Movement was opened at his official residence as MLC in Royal Hotel, Lucknow and his residence became centre of activities.
