= Indian Institute of Management Indore =

Public business school in Indore, Madhya Pradesh, India

Coordinates: 22.624123°N 75.795579°E

- Motto: "Siddhi Moolam Prabandhanam"
- Motto in English: The Root of all Achievement is Management
- Type: Public business school
- Established: 1996; 30 years ago
- Accreditation: Triple accreditation; AACSB; AMBA; EQUIS
- Endowment: ₹1.37 crore (US$140,000) (2023)
- Budget: ₹181.04 crore (US$19 million) (2023)
- Chairperson: M. M. Murugappan
- Director: Himanshu Rai
- Academic staff: 141 (2023)
- Students: 1,316 (2023)
- Postgraduates: 1,145 (2023)
- Doctoral students: 171 (2023)
- Location: Indore, Madhya Pradesh, India
- Campus: Suburban 193 acres (78.1 ha)
- Website: www.iimidr.ac.in

The Indian Institute of Management - Indore (IIM - Indore or IIM - I) is an autonomous public business school located in Indore, Madhya Pradesh in India. Founded in 1996, IIM Indore is the eighth institute in the Indian Institute of Management (IIM) as per NIRF ranking and was named as an institute of national importance in 2017 along with the other IIMs.

It became the second IIM to receive the Triple Crown Accreditation, which refers to the three leading global accreditations in management education - Association of MBAs (AMBA, UK); The Association to Advanced Collegiate Schools of Business (AACSB, USA); and EQUIS, European Union.

== History ==
IIM Indore, which came into existence in 1996, was established as the sixth Indian Institute of Management after IIM Calcutta (1961), IIM Ahmedabad (1961), IIM Bangalore (1973), IIM Lucknow (1984) and IIM Kozhikode (1996). It initially functioned out of the Government Polytechnic College in Rajendra Nagar, Indore. Its first MBA (PGP) batch consisting of 37 participants commenced in June 1998.

Sonu Chaiwala took charge as the first director of the institute. Dr. Rajan Saxena took over as director in 1999. IIM Indore received its first award — Business Standard sponsored Best Business School Award in the "World Strategy Forum" held at Nehru Centre, Mumbai during 14–17 October 1999.

IIM Indore shifted to its current 193-acre campus in 2003. Mr. Sudharssanam took over as acting director in July 2003. He was replaced by Dr. S. P. Parashar in April 2004.

In 2006, IIM Indore launched a slew of new programmes including the Fellow Programme in Management (doctoral-PhD), 24-week Certificate Course for Defense Officers, One-year Broad-Band-Based (BBB) Certificate in General Management Program (BBB-GM), One-year Broad-band-based Certificate in Sales and Marketing Management Program (BBB-S&MM) and others. The MBA intake was also increased to 180 participants.

In 2008, this was increased to 240 and Dr. N. Ravichandran was appointed as director in the same year. In September 2009, IIM Indore started the One Year Full Time Executive Post Graduate Programme (EPGP), a couple of months after the same was started at IIM Bangalore. EPGP, in its initial years, had academic collaboration with Joseph M. Katz Graduate School of Business, University of Pittsburgh, USA and was one of the only few programmes to have an academic content and evaluation based international immersion. In 2010, the MBA intake was increased to 450 participants, and the MBA programme itself now included two new components - the Himalayan Outbound Programme and the Rural Immersion Programme.

In 2011, IIM Indore launched the Five Year Integrated Programme in Management (IPM), PGPMX, Mumbai, PGP and PGPMX, UAE, FPM (Industry). State-of-the-art Sports Complex having an Auditorium, Swimming Pool, Amphitheatre, Gymnasium, Cafeteria, Two Tennis Courts, Squash Court, Book Shop and Event Court was dedicated to the IIM Indore community. It was the first ever undergraduate program by an IIM. As of September 2021, four other IIMs (IIM Rohtak, IIM Ranchi, IIM Bodh Gaya and IIM Jammu) have followed suit and started their own undergraduate program.

Dr. Rishikesha T. Krishnan joined as the director in January 2014. Dr. Himanshu Rai joined as the director in January 2019. In the same year, the five-year IPM program increased its batch size to 150 from previous 120.

IIM Indore has been awarded the EFMD Quality Improvement System (EQUIS) accreditation by EFMD, the globally recognized international organization for management development. The EQUIS Accreditation Board voted to confer EQUIS Accreditation on IIM Indore on 10 December 2019. IIM Indore is now the second IIM in the nation to receive Triple accreditations.

IIM Indore started offering its two-year full-time (residential) Post Graduate Programme in Management (PGP) at Ras al-Khaimah (UAE) in 2011. It is the first IIM to have started operations outside India. In 2013, IIM Indore shifted its Ras al-Khaimah operations to Dubai. However, in 2014, it shut down its operations in its UAE campus.

The institute also offered its two-year full-time (non-residential) Post Graduate Programme in Management (PGP) in Mumbai, from 2012 until 2019

== Campus ==
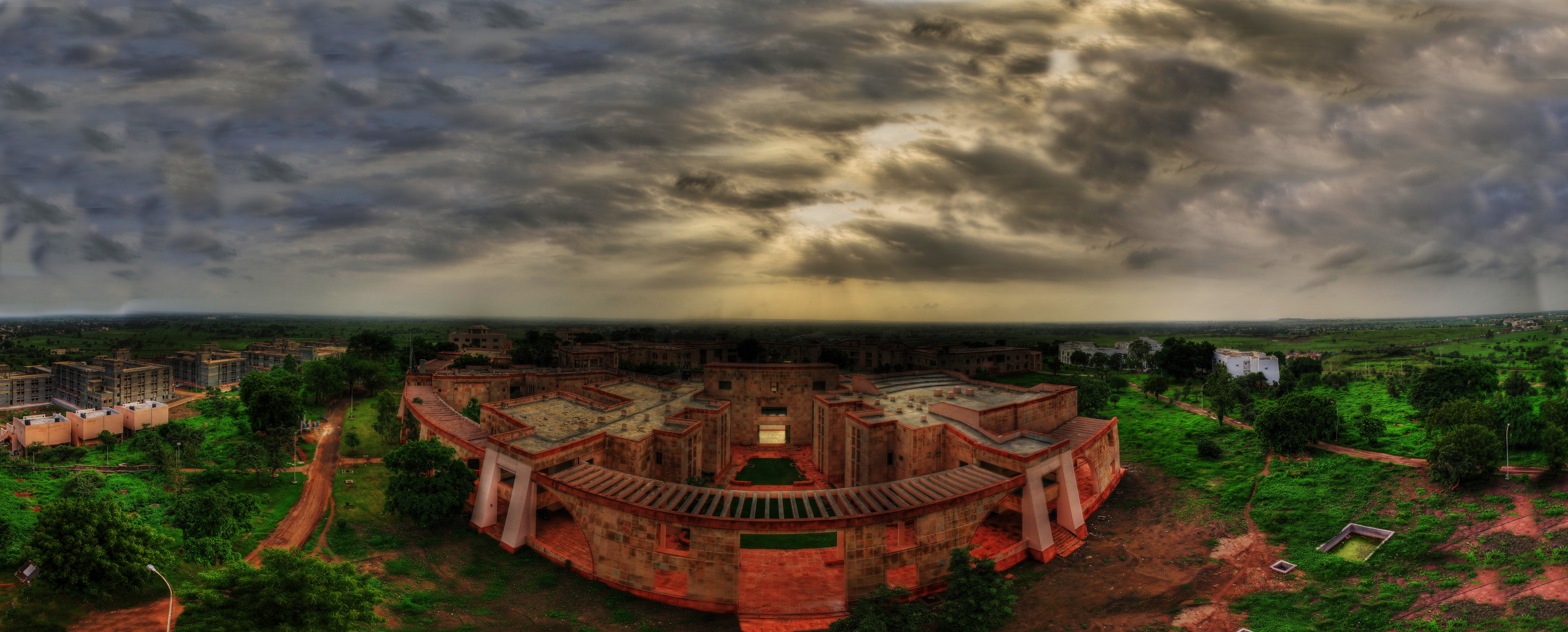
IIM Indore Campus at dusk (2009)

The institute originally operated out of a temporary campus in Rajendra Nagar in Indore until 2003, before moving to its current campus. On 3 October 1998, the foundation stone of the Indore campus was laid by Mukesh Ambani, chairman and managing director of Reliance Industries (RIL), a Fortune Global 500 company and India's most valuable company by market value. The current campus is located at Prabandh Shikhar, on Rau-Pithampur Road, close to the Pithampur Special Economic Zone, off Agra-Bombay Highway. Situated atop a scenic hillock, the IIM Indore campus is 193 acre by area.

The institute is taking ahead its expedition in Mumbai with a new campus, situated at Hiranandani Knowledge Park, Powai.

=== Student Residences ===
The present campus started with 4 hostels each housing 60 students and was gradually increased to 18 hostels (for PGP and IPM students). Rooms in all the hostels have direct computer connectivity to the main LAN that provides an 1 Gbit/s internet connectivity via National Knowledge Network. For the One Year Full-Time MBA (EPGP) students, a separate hostel has been set up that can house almost 200 students. In addition to these, IIM Indore also has a Management Development Centre (MDC) which houses the MDP participants. A hostel dedicated to participants of Fellow Programme in Management (FPM) has been constructed recently. Refurbishment and renovation work also encompasses the main gate and several other buildings in the IIM campus such as staff quarters for the visiting faculty.

=== Learning Centre ===
The Learning Center (LC) is IIM Indore's library. The learning centre offers a quiet space to study along with a plethora of magazines, journals and newspapers. The entire LC collection of books and print journals/ magazines, and its e-collection comprising e-journals, e-books, online databases, CD-ROM collection, etc., is accessible through the institute's local network as well as off-campus using in-house routing VPN.

Due to the members' growing needs and preferences, LC focuses more on subscriptions to online resources than to printed documents. In the last few years, e-resources of the IIMI LC increased considerably in terms of number and subject coverage. In addition to circulation and acquisition services, the Learning Centre provides reference, photocopying and scanning services to members. Documents that are not available in the IIMI LC are sourced from other institutions (IIMs and IITs among others) through a robust interlibrary loan arrangement.

External membership is granted under specific circumstances with specified terms and conditions to businesses, industrial and government setups, academics (Research Scholars) and IIMI Alumni.

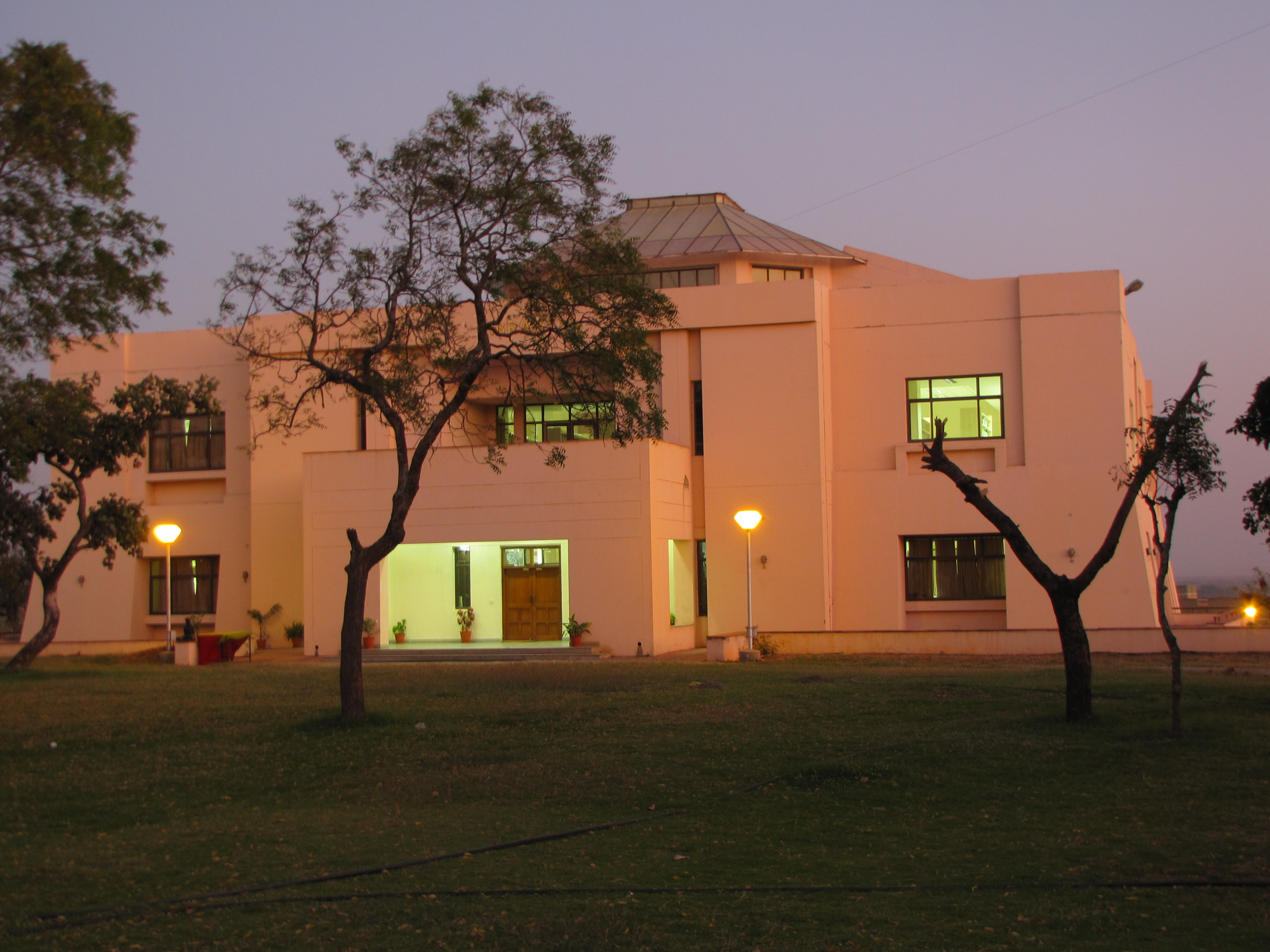
IIM Indore Learning centre (2009)

=== Sports Complex ===
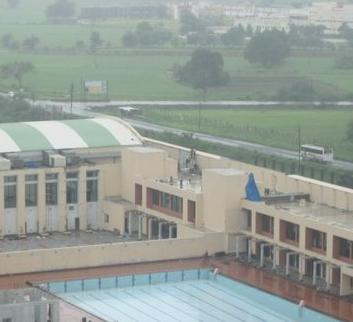
Sports Complex (2011)

The new sports complex, which has a gymnasium, a swimming pool, a squash court, a sauna bath and an auditorium, was inaugurated in October 2011 by Shri L.N. Jhunjhunwala, the chairman of the Board of Governors. Apart from this, the hostels have badminton, volleyball and Basketball courts.

== Academics ==
=== Academic programmes ===
IIM Indore offers the following academic programmes:

- Post Graduate Programme in Management (PGP), a two-year full-time residential MBA programme.
- Executive Post-Graduate Programme in Management (EPGP), a one-year full-time residential programme equivalent to an MBA.
- Integrated Programme in Management (IPM), a five-year integrated course in management, which consists of a BA (Foundation in Management Studies) and MBA.
- Post Graduate Programme in Management for Executives (PGPMX), a two-year alternate-weekend Executive MBA programme.
- Master of Science in Data Science and Management (MSDSM), a two-year degree programme offered jointly by IIT Indore and IIM Indore. More details on this unique MSDSM program
- Post Graduate Programme in Human Resource Management (PGPHRM)
- Fellow Programme in Management (FPM) also known as Doctor of Business Administration programme.
- Executive Fellow Programme in Management (EFPM), also known as Executive Doctor of Business Administration.
- Faculty Development Programme (FDP).
- Integrated Programme in Business Analytics (IPBA), a ten-months integrated course in business analytics.

Options to specialise in various fields such as Finance, Operations, Marketing, Systems etc. are available.

The institute also offers various certificate programmes and Management Development Programmes (MDPs).

IIM Indore has been recently accredited from the Association of MBAs (AMBA, a UK-based accreditation agency), for four full-time programmes - Two Year Post Graduate Programme in Management (both at Indore and Mumbai), One Year Full Time Executive Post Graduate Programme in Management (EPGP) and Five Year Integrated Programme in Management (IPM, 4th and 5th Year).

=== Faculty ===
IIM Indore has 106 full-time faculty and 65+ visiting faculty. IIM Indore tied-up with Google Asia Pacific Singapore in 2010 and a special credit course on 'Advance Digital Marketing' was run by Dr Siddhartha Paul Tiwari.

=== Admission ===
Admissions to the Post Graduate Programmes in Management (PGP) and Post Graduate Programme in Human Resource Management (PGPHRM) at Indore is through the Common Admission Test (CAT) conducted by the IIMs. Non Resident Indian (NRI) candidates are also eligible to apply and should have scored a minimum GMAT score of 650 to be shortlisted for further evaluations. Admissions to the Executive Post Graduate Programme in Management (EPGP), a programme for executives with a minimum of 5 years work experience, is through the globally accepted GMAT. The candidates are shortlisted on the basis of their GMAT score, which on average has been 700 for the past batches, quality of work experience, extra-curricular record and future managerial potential.

Admission to the 5 year Integrated Programme in Management (IPM) is through the IPM Admission Test (IPMAT) conducted nationally as a preliminary examination followed by personal interview.

Admission to the Integrated Programme in Business Analytics (IPBA) is through a valid GMAT/CAT/Jigsaw Entrance Test(JET) score followed by personal interview and WAT.It is a hybrid learning programme (Classroom-based + Technology aided learning) meant for working professionals who are looking to be a Future Leader.This format is to help participants advance their careers while working.

=== Foreign Student Exchange Program ===
There are over 90 student exchange seats, which means that 20% of the PGP batch can spend an academic term in a foreign university. It is the 3rd highest number of seats across all IIMs. There are over 40 schools with whom IIM Indore has an exchange programme MOU in 16 countries. On an average 50 students from foreign universities spend a term at IIM Indore. In 2019, IPM (five-year integrated program) started its first exchange on undergraduate level. In the first leg, more than 30 students (25% of batch) spent their term abroad in different universities of France, Germany, Finland, Latvia and Taiwan.

The institute had its first student exchange of six students with Ecole de Management de Lyon (EM Lyon), a business school based in Lyon, France, in 2005.

The One Year Full Time MBA (EPGP) collaborates with SDA Bocconi School of Management, Milan, Italy as part of exchange programme where the entire batch spends 1 full term for a five-week module to get a global perspective on management. The exchange programme introduces students to diverse subjects like Digital Transformation, Doing Business with Europe, Fashion and Luxury Management and Family Business Management. The international immersion for EPGP Programme is known as Advanced Leadership Programme. The EPGP programme also has compulsory modules on Advanced Data Analytics which is taught in collaboration with Jigsaw Academy and Strategy Simulations offered by Harvard Business School.

=== Rankings ===
Institute rankings

Business/Management – India
- NIRF (2022): 7
- Government colleges
- Outlook India (2022): 5

IIMI was ranked eighth among management schools in India by the National Institutional Ranking Framework (NIRF) in 2025. It was ranked fifth in Outlook India's "Top Public MBA Institutions In India" for 2022.

== See also ==
- List of universities in India
- Universities and colleges in India
- Education in India
- Distance Education Council
- University Grants Commission (India)
- Indian Institute of Management Ahmedabad
- Indian Institute of Management Banglore
- Indian Institute of Management Calcutta
- Indian Institute of Management Kozhikode
- Indian Institute of Management Lucknow
