= Baleshwar Rai =

Baleshwar Rai is a 1970-batch AGMUT cadre Indian Administrative Service officer who retired as a secretary in the government of India. He hails from Dhadni, Ghazipur. He has held many important positions in his tenure such as the secretary of public grievances and coordination, additional secretary in Union Labour ministry, the Chief Secretary of Goa, advisor to the governor in Chandigarh, the chairman of Delhi Jal board and NDMC He has held several important positions after retirement like the Chairman of Delhi Public Grieviences Commission, Chairman of the governing Body of UPRAS Vidyalaya, Chairman of CSRL, Chairman of the governing body of Kirori Mal College. he was also an integral part of csrl. Currently he is a member of Shri Mata Vaishno Devi shrine board.

== Controversies ==
His role as NDMC administrator came under the scanner of CBI's anti-corruption branch which started investigating him for corruption charges in 1996.

He had been alleged case of sexual harassment. A senior teacher of Upras Vidyalaya had alleged Rai of sexual misbehaviour and also filed an FIR on the same matter. The case is on trial in a local Court.
