= Ghazipur City–Anand Vihar Terminal Express =

Train in India

Ghazipur City-Anand Vihar Terminal Suhaildev Superfast Express (via Prayagraj)

Overview
- Service type: Superfast
- First service: 14 August 2017; 8 years ago
- Current operator(s): Northern Railway

Route
- Termini: Ghazipur City (GCT); Anand Vihar Terminal (ANVT)
- Stops: 9
- Distance travelled: 834 km (518 mi)
- Average journey time: 14h 35m
- Service frequency: Bi-weekly (Note: Runs bi-weekly for every direction.)
- Train number(s): 22433 /22434

On-board services
- Class(es): AC 2 Tier, AC 3 Tier, Sleeper class, General Unreserved
- Seating arrangements: No
- Sleeping arrangements: Yes
- Catering facilities: On-board catering E-catering
- Observation facilities: Large windows
- Baggage facilities: No
- Other facilities: Below the seats

Technical
- Rolling stock: LHB coach
- Track gauge: 1,676 mm (5 ft 6 in)
- Electrification: Yes
- Operating speed: 58 km/h (36 mph) average including halts

The 22433/22434 Ghazipur City-Anand Vihar Terminal Suhaildev Superfast Express (via Prayagraj) is a superfast express train belonging to Northern Railway zone that runs between Ghazipur City and Anand Vihar Terminal in India. It is currently being operated with 22433/22434 train numbers on Bi-weekly basis.

== Service ==
The 22433/Ghazipur–Anand Vihar Terminal, Suhaildev Superfast Express has an average speed of 55 km/h and covers 834 km in 15h 10m. The 22419/Suhaildev Superfast Express has an average speed of 58 km/h and covers 834 km in 14h 20m.

== Route and halts ==
The important halts of the train are:

- Ghazipur City
- Aunrihar Junction
- Kerakat
- Jaunpur Junction
- Zafarabad Junction
- Prayagraj Junction
- Kanpur Central
- Ghaziabad Junction
- Anand Vihar Terminal.

== Coach composition ==
The train has standard LHB rake with a maximum speed of 130 km/h. The train consists of 21 coaches:

- 1 AC First-class
- 1 AC II Tier
- 3 AC III Tier
- 7 Sleeper coaches
- 6 General
- 2 Head-on Generation

== Schedule ==
| Train number | Station code | Departure station | Departure time | Departure day | Arrival station | Arrival time | Arrival day |
|---|---|---|---|---|---|---|---|
| 22433 | GCT | Ghazipur City | 4:00 PM | Tue, Sat | Anand Vihar Terminal | 7:15 AM | Wednesday, Sunday |
| 22434 | ANVT | Anand Vihar Terminal | 7:10 PM | Mon, Fri | Ghazipur City | 9:35 AM | Tuesday, Saturday |

== Traction ==
It is hauled by a Ghaziabad Loco Shed based WAP-7 electric locomotive from Ghazipur City to Anand Vihar Terminal and vice versa.

== Rake sharing ==
22419/22420 Ghazipur City-Anand Vihar Terminal Suhaildev Superfast Express (via Lucknow).

== See also ==
- Anand Vihar Terminal railway station
- Ghazipur City railway station
- Suhaildev Superfast Express
