= Kolkata–Ghazipur City Weekly Express =

Train in India

Ghazipur City–Kolkata Weekly Express

Overview
- Service type: Express
- First service: 19 December 2016; 8 years ago
- Current operator(s): Eastern Railway

Route
- Termini: Ghazipur City (GCT); Kolkata (KOAA)
- Stops: 13
- Distance travelled: 743 km (462 mi)
- Average journey time: 14 hrs 20 mins
- Service frequency: Weekly (Note: Runs one day in a week for every direction.)
- Train number(s): 13121 / 13122

On-board services
- Class(es): AC 2 Tier, AC 3 Tier, Sleeper Class, General Unreserved
- Seating arrangements: No
- Sleeping arrangements: Yes
- Catering facilities: E-catering only
- Observation facilities: Large windows
- Baggage facilities: No
- Other facilities: Below the seats

Technical
- Rolling stock: LHB coach
- Track gauge: 1,676 mm (5 ft 6 in)
- Operating speed: 52 km/h (32 mph) average including halts.

The 13121 / 13122 Ghazipur City–Kolkata Weekly Express is an Express train belonging to Eastern Railway zone that runs between Ghazipur City and Kolkata in India. It is currently being operated with 13122/13121 train numbers on a weekly basis.

== Service ==
The 13122/Ghazipur City–Kolkata Express has an average speed of 52 km/h and covers 743 km in 14h 20m . The 13121/Kolkata–Ghazipur City Express has an average speed of 50 km/h and covers 743 km in 15h.

== Route & halts ==
The important halts of the train are:

- Ghazipur City
- Ballia
- Chhapra Junction
- Patliputra Junction
- Patna Junction
- Bakhtiyarpur Junction
- Hathidah Junction
- Kiul Junction
- Jhajha
- Jasidih Junction
- Madhupur Junction
- Asansol Junction
- Durgapur
- Kolkata

== Coach composition ==
The train has standard LHB rakes with a maximum speed of 110 km/h. The train consists of 18 coaches:

- 1 AC II Tier
- 3 AC III Tier
- 6 Sleeper coaches
- 6 General
- 2 Head on Generation

== Traction ==
It is hauled by a Howrah-based WAP-7 (HOG)-equipped locomotive from Ghazipur City to Kolkata and vice versa.

== Rake sharing ==
The trains shares its rake with 22324 / 22323 Shabd Bhedi Superfast Express.

== See also ==
- Kolkata railway station
- Ghazipur City railway station
- Shabd Bhedi Superfast Express
- Suhaildev Superfast Express
