= Babai, Rajasthan =

Coordinates: 19°13′35.49″N 72°50′46.96″E

Babai
- Village
- Interactive map of Babai
- Country: India
- State: Rajasthan
- District: Jhunjhunu
- Tehsil: Khetri

Population (2011)
  - Total: 2,237
- Time zone: UTC+5:30 (IST)
- PIN: 333501
- ISO 3166 code: RJ-IN

Babai is a town in the Jhunjhunu district of the state of Rajasthan, India. It is located in the foothills of the Arawali mountain range at 420 meters above sea level. It has a fort with a moat surrounding it,

The town has a population of 2237. The population speaks Hindi and Rajasthani and haryanvi.
