= Magai =

The Magai is a small river of Eastern Uttar Pradesh, India. This river originated from village Dubawan in Azamgarh Uttar Pradesh This rivers enters Mau and Ghazipur district in the north of Shadiabad and joins the Tamsa river in ballia district and Tamsa river eventually meets the Ganges near ballia district.

The Magai river touch Villages like Muhammad Pur, Hata, Silaich, Karimuddinpur, Mahend, Nasrat Pur etc.

It is famous for its pan (betel) leaves.

Meet Tamsa river Near Bhikharipur.

Originate from Dubawan, Azamgarh District Uttar Pradesh.

It connects many small village such as Hata (mohammadabad), Mahend, madhuban and malikpura.
