= Himanshu Rai (academic) =

Indian professor, speaker and writer (born 1969)

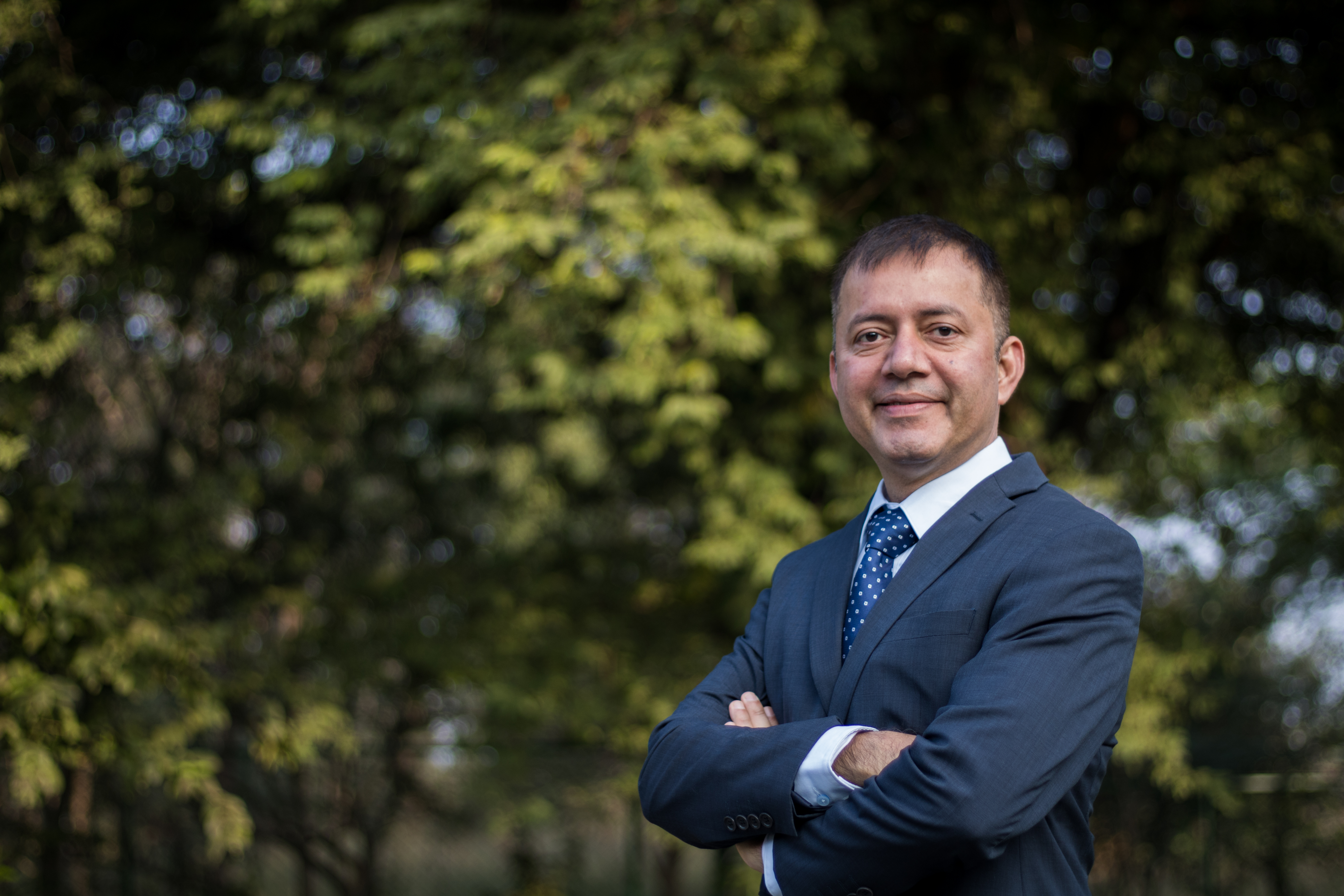
- Rai in 2019
- Born: December 25, 1969 (age 56); India
- Occupation: Director of Indian Institute of Management Indore

Himanshu Rai (born December 25, 1969) is an Indian professor, speaker and writer. He is the Director of Indian Institute of Management, Indore. He also serves as a professor of strategic business negotiations, leadership through literature and Justice, ethics and morality at the Indian Institute of Management, Lucknow.

== Early life and career ==
Himanshu Rai attended the National Institute of Technology Karnataka between 1987-1991 where he obtained a BE in Electrical and Electronics Engineering. Between 2000-2005 he obtained a PhD from the Indian Institute of Management Ahmedabad where his thesis focused on Morphology of conflict resolution and negotiation.

Rai began his career in 1991 as a Graduate Trainee at Tata Steel.

== Academic career ==
Rai began his academic career in 2005 as a faculty staff at the XLRI – Xavier School of Management. In 2006, he joined the Indian Institute of Management, Lucknow as a faculty staff in HR. He was appointed Dean at the MISB Bocconi, Mumbai branch campus business school where he served till 2016.

In December 2018, he was appointed director of the Indian Institute of Management, Indore. Rai's TEDx talk on "Ethical Leadership: Lessons from the Vedas" has won him several awards. In 2023, he was reappointed director of the Indian Institute of Management Indore.

Rai's book titled "Organizational Behaviour" is co-authored by Steven McShane and Mary Ann Von Glinow. He has trained several people in negotiations and leadership. He has also consulted for World Bank and the Government of India where he audited programs sponsored by the Planning Commission of India. He also serves as the chairperson of the board of directors, Indore Management Association and Chairperson of the Advisory Board of Durban University of Technology Business School.

== Publications ==
Rai has contributed to the academic field, with over 40 papers and chapters published in peer-reviewed journals and books. His research interests encompass a wide range of topics, including negotiation, cross-cultural issues, management, religion, spirituality, gender, influence tactics, 360-degree feedback, recruitment advertising, and proxemics.

== Books ==
- Rai H. (2022). Organizational Behaviour. McGraw Hill Education, India
- Rai, H. (2017). Negotiation. McGraw Hill Education, India
- Rai, H. (2005). The Role of Hinduism in Global India and her Business Ethics. In Capaldi, N, (Eds.), Business and Religion: A Clash of Civilizations? Salem, MA:M&M Scrivener Press. 379-389.
- Rai, H. (2005). The Emerging World Trade Regime, Social Clause and Implications for Employee Relations Management. In Chawla, K.N., (Eds.), Enhancing Global Business Competitiveness, Delhi: Wisdom Publications. 160-175.
