= Pavhari Baba =

Hindu ascetic and saint

Personal life
- Born: 1798 Jaunpur
- Died: 1898 (aged 99–100) Ghazipur (aged 99-100)
- Cause of death: burning (self-immolation)

Religious life
- Religion: Hinduism
- Philosophy: Hatha yoga

Religious career
- Influenced: Swami Vivekananda

Quotation

Remain lying at the door of your Guru like a dog.

Pavhari Baba (1798–1898) was a Hindu ascetic and saint. He was born in Premapur, Jaunpur in a Brahmin family. In his childhood he went to Ghazipur to study under the tutelage of his uncle who was a follower of Ramanuja or Shri sect . After finishing his studies he travelled to many places. At Girnar in Kathiawar he was initiated into Yoga.

He then came back to Ghazipur and built an underground hermitage in his house where he used to practise meditation and Yoga for days. He was noted for his humility, politeness and spirit of welfare. One night a thief entered his hermitage. When the thief ran away leaving the stolen things behind, as Pavhari Baba had woken up from sleep, he chased the thief and offered him the things he stole from his house. The incident had deep impact on the thief who later became a monk and a follower of Pavhari Baba.

In 1890 Swami Vivekananda went to Ghazipur and met him. According to Sister Nivedita, Baba died by burning in 1898, which is considered as self-immolation.

== Early life ==
Pavhari Baba gained popularity as a yogi, yet his life is shrouded with mystery. He was born in village Premapur, Jaunpur in a Brahmin family. In his childhood he was taken to Ghazipur to study and there he lived in his uncle's house. His uncle was a Naishthika Brahmachari (Note: The people who vow to observe lifelong celibacy.) and a follower of Ramanuja or Shri sect. (Note: Vivekananda in "Sketch of the life of Pavhari Baba" gave a brief note here: "Hindu ascetics are split up into the main divisions of Sannyâsins, Yogis, Vairâgis, and Panthis. The Sannyasins are the followers of Advaitism after Shankarâchârya; the Yogis, though following the Advaita system, are specialists in practising the different systems of Yoga; the Vairagis are the dualistic disciples of Râmânujâchârya and others; the Panthis, professing either philosophy, are orders founded during the Mohammedan rule. ") He owned a piece of land in Ghazipur which Pavhari Baba got in inheritance. He was a diligent student of Vyākaraṇa and Nyaya and had demonstrated mastery in many branches of Hindu philosophy in his youth.

== Initiation into Yoga ==
In his youth, he visited many pilgrimages as a Brahmachari. He acquired knowledge of Dravidian languages. He had also acquaintance with the Vaishnavas of Chaitanya Mahaprabhu's order. At Girnar in Kathiawar, he was first initiated into Yoga. He also became a disciple of a Sannyasi and from him he learned Advaita Vedanta.

== Ascetic life at Ghazipur ==
After finishing his studies and travels, Pavhari Baba came back to Ghazipur, the place where he was brought up. Pavhari Baba renounced the world, worldly way of life, and built an underground hermitage (cave) where he used to stay alone with his followers one Cobra and mongoose.The cobra keeps his mani on his own head which gives bright light in the caves for study the saint. Vivekananda related this act of Pavhari Baba with the practice of Hindu yogi's who choose cave or similar spots to practice yoga where temperature is even and where there is not any distracting sound.

In this cave he meditated for days. Thus he became known by the sobriquet Pavhari Baba which means pav(pawan means air, ahaari means food "air-eating holy man". People from far and wide sought to visit Baba. It is said he used to communicate with visitors from behind a wall as no one's shadow should fall on him as he was bal bramachari. Once he did not come out of his hermitage for five years and people thought he had died. But, later he came out from his place.

=== Remarkable incidents ===
Pavhari Baba was noted for his polite and kind behaviour. When he met Vivekananda he used expressions like "this servant", "my honour" etc. which surprised and pleased Vivekananda. People also used to admire his humility and spirit of welfare.

Swami Nikhilananda mentioned an incident in his book Vivekananda: a biography. Once a dog ran away with a piece of bread from Pavhari Baba's hermitage which he kept as his food. Baba chased the dog, praying: "Please wait; my Lord; let me butter the bread for you".

According to same biography of Nikhilananda, once a Cobra bit him, while he was suffering terrible pain, his remark was: "Oh, he was a messenger from my beloved."

One night when Pavhari Baba was sleeping, a thief entered his hermitage. When he had just finished stealing things, Pavhari Baba woke up. This frightened the thief, who then ran and abandoned his bundle of stolen items. Pavhari Baba chased the thief, caught him and requested him with folded hands to accept the goods which he had stolen from his hermitage saying: "All these are yours, my God". The thief was surprised by being addressed as "God" and felt remorse for the crime he had just committed. This incident changed the thief and he later became Pavhari Baba's disciple and gradually a saint himself.

== Swami Vivekananda's visit ==
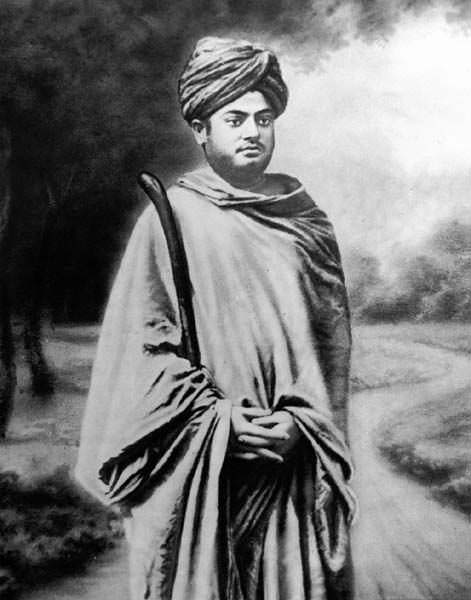
Swami Vivekananda met Pabhari Baba in Ghazipur in January–February, 1890.

In January 1890, Swami Vivekananda (Note: At that time he was known as Narendranath Datta. Narendranath Datta was named "Vivekananda" bu Ajit Singh of Khetri in 1893. See Ajit Singh of Khetri#Relationship with Swami Vivekananda for further details.) went to Ghazipur to meet Pavhari Baba. In a letter dated 21 January 1890, Vivekananda wrote—

I reached Ghazipur three days ago... I again had a great mind to go over to Kashi, but the object of my coming here, namely, an interview with the Babâji (Pavhari Baba, the great saint), has not yet been realised, and. hence the delay of a few days becomes necessary.

In the next letter dated 31 January 1890, Vivekananda wrote about Baba's unwillingness to meet people. In the very next letter written just four days later, on 4 February 1890, Vivekananda informed that he had met Baba. In that letter Vivekananda wrote:

...through supreme good fortune, I have obtained an interview with Babaji. A great sage indeed! — It is all very wonderful, and in this atheistic age, a towering representation of marvellous power born of Bhakti and Yoga!

=== Vivekananda's desire to become Baba's disciple and seeing Ramakrishna in dream ===
When Vivekananda went to Ghazipur, he was suffering from lumbago and it was becoming impossible for him to move or sit in meditation. After the meeting with Baba, Vivekananda sought his refuge and desired to become his disciple. Baba also requested him to stay for few more days at Ghazipur, which Vivekananda accepted. Vivekananda wrote on 4 February 1890's letter:

I have sought refuge in his grace; and he has given me hope — a thing very few may be fortunate enough to obtain. It is Babaji's wish that I stay on for some days here, and he would do me some good. So following this saint's bidding I shall remain here for some time.

But the night before the religious initiation by Baba, Vivekananda reportedly had a dream in which he saw his master Ramakrishna looking at him with a melancholy face. That dream made Vivekananda realize that no one other than Ramakrishna could be his teacher, and he gave up the idea of becoming Baba's disciple.

=== Influence on Vivekananda ===
Do you think that physical help is the only help possible? Is it not possible that one mind can help other minds even without the activity of the body?

— Pavhari Baba to Vivekananda

Though Vivekananda gave up the idea of becoming Pavhari Baba's disciple after seeing Ramakrishna's sad face in his dream the night before his religious initiation, Baba deeply influenced him. According to Sister Nivedita, Vivekananda always held Pavhari Baba second only to Ramakrishna. Vivekananda delivered a lecture "Sketch of the life of Pavhari Baba" which was later published as a booklet.

Once Vivekananda asked Pavhari Baba the reason for his not coming out of his hermitage and doing service for the welfare of the society. Pavharai Baba replied: "Do you think that physical help is the only help possible? Is it not possible that one mind can help other minds even without the activity of the body?"

Pavhari Baba advised Vivekananda to remain lying at the door of a teacher's house like a dog. Vivekananda interpreted this to mean staying loyal to the teacher and having patience and perseverance, which are essential to achieving success.

== Death ==
In the book The Master as I saw Him, Sister Nivedita wrote tha Pavhari Baba died by burning in 1898. He did not come out of his hermitage for several days and then one day people noticed smoke coming out of his hermitage and also got smell of burning flesh. This was described as self-immolation. According to Swami Nikhilananda:

...the saint, having come to realize the approaching end of his earthly life, had offered his body as the last oblation to the Lord, in an act of supreme sacrifice.

Vivekananda was staying at Almora when he learned of Pavhari Baba's death.

== Legacy ==
=== Pawhari Baba Ashram ===
Ex-minister Sharda Chauhan, in Kalyan Singh ministry has been actively promoting elevation of Pawhari Baba's ashram as Ghazipur tourism spot. Uttar Pradesh Government included Pawhari Baba Ashram in Uttar Pradesh Spiritual Circuit 2, which is currently run by the 5th generation of Pawhari baba's elder brother Ganga Tiwari.
