= Ali Quli Khan Zaman =

Mughal general

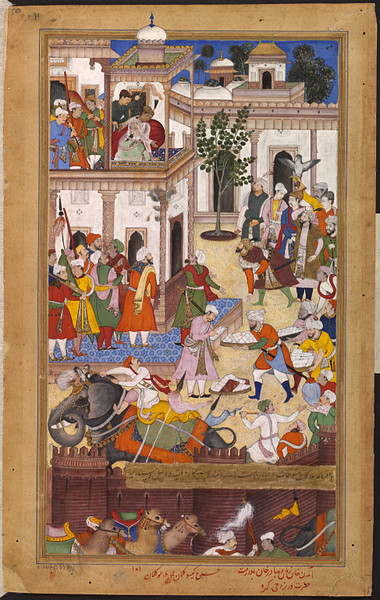
- Submission of Ali Quli Khan and Bahadur Khan.

The governor of Jaunpur.
- Monarch: Akbar

Military service
- Allegiance: Mughal Empire
- Commands: Mughal Army
- Battles/wars: Numerous battles against Afghans of East Uttar Pradesh and Bihar; Battle of Kara (1567)

Ali Quli Khan Zaman was a leading Uzbeg noble in the court of Mughal emperor Akbar. Before Akbar, he had also served under Humayun and later commanded the Mughal army to the eastern Uttar Pradesh region in battle against the rebel Afghans. Ali Quli later rebelled, supported by his Uzbeg kinsmen. His rebellion distracted the Mughal Empire for two years until 1567.

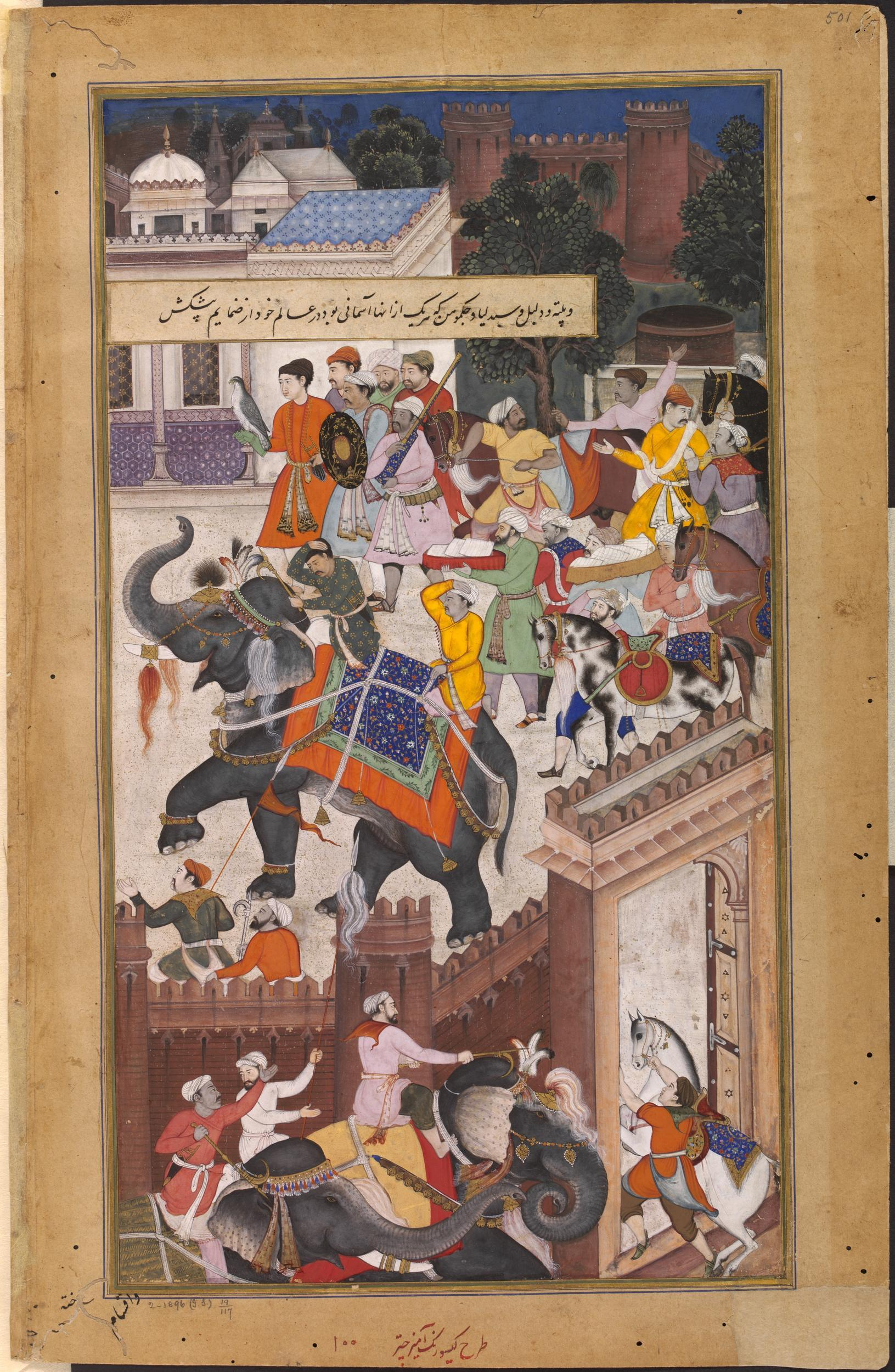
Ali Quli Khan Zaman and Bahadur Khan give gifts to Akbar

== Career ==
Ali Quli Khan had kinship ties with other leading Uzbeg nobles of the Akbar who enjoyed powerful position and prestige during the time of Humayun as well. These included Bahadur Khan, Sikandar Khan, Iskandar Khan and Abdullah Khan. These nobles served the Mughal Empire in their own capacity in various regions. Ali Quli primarily proved himself as a distinguished commander by waging wars against the Afghans of the Jaunpur region. He along with his Kinsmen controlled the regions like Banaras, Awadh and Jaunpur. When Abdullah Khan, the governor of Malwa rebelled and on being pursued by Akbar fled to Gujarat, Akbar developed a prejudice against the Uzbeg nobles.

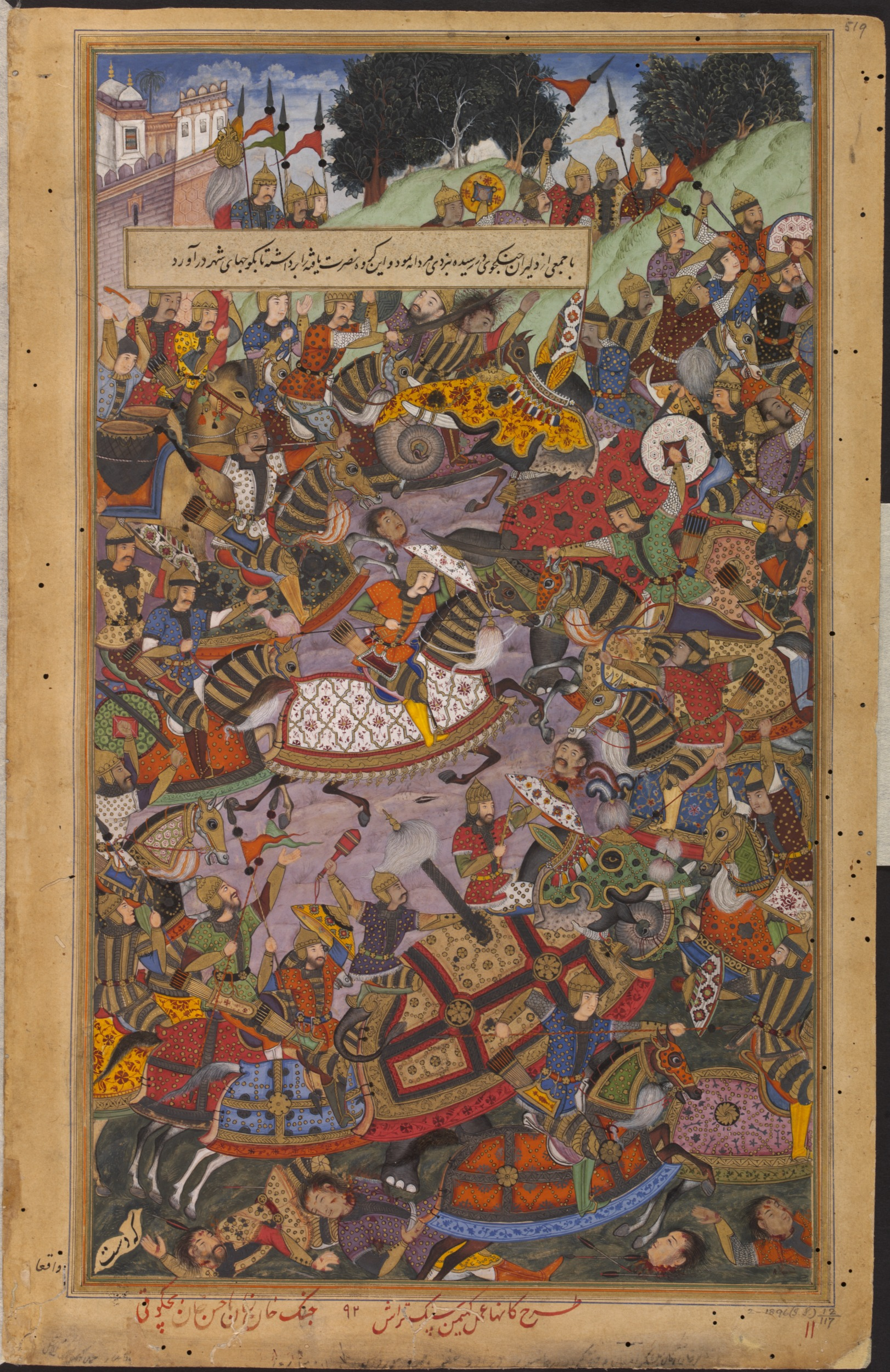
Illustration from Akbarnama showing victory of Ali Quli Khan on Afghans at Gomti, 1561

Akbar was also skeptical of the Khan Zaman's conduct, who fell in love with the son of a Camel rider whom he called "My Padshah" and bowed down to him. Being aware of the Akbar's stand regarding Uzbegs and influenced by the tribal sense of independence that was prevalent in Afghans, Ali Quli decided to declare independence from Mughals. In the meantime he also developed friendship with Afghan ruler of Bengal, Sulaiman Karrani. He recruited an army of 30,000 which contained Hindustanis, Afghans and Uzbegs in a bid to pursue his ambitions.

== Rebellion against Mughals ==
Ali Quli was joined by other disgruntled Uzbeg nobles who felt that they were not rewarded as per the service they did for the Mughals. In 1565 when Akbar ordered one of the Uzbeg noble called Iskandar Khan to appear before him at his court, the alarmed Uzbegs under Ali Quli Khan raised the banner of open rebellion. The rebels attacked Kannauj and Kara into two separate groups. In order to contain the rebellion, Akbar took diplomatic step to isolate the rebels. The letter was sent to ruler of Orrisa, who was in war of attrition with the Bengal for a long time and since Bengal was supporting Uzbegs, this step was taken to put a pressure upon the Sultan of Bengal.

Jaunpur was made the headquarter of Mughal forces and message was sent to commander of Rohtas fort to assist Mughal forces. Akbar also commanded his nobles to build houses in the Jaunpur to undertake a long run campaign against the rebels until they are crushed. In 1566; after a two-year campaign, Akbar was able to control them but given the friendship of Munim Khan, Akbar's wakil with the Uzbegs they were pardoned and their Jagir were also returned by Akbar, who was persuaded by Munim Khan to do so. In the meantime, Akbar was distracted by the activities of his half brother Mirza Muhammad Hakim, the ruler of Kabul, who after being ousted by Sulaiman Mirza was trying to foment dissatisfaction in the Punjab region against Akbar.

The Uzbegs now declared Mirza Hakim as their emperor and started reading his name in Khutba with issuance of coinage in his name. This made Akbar rush quickly to contain them for the second time after chasing Mirza Hakim out of Punjab. The attempt of the Uzbegs under Ali Quli Khan to create dissatisfaction in the empire resulted in loss of Akbar's trust upon them.

== Death ==
In 1567, Akbar defeated the Uzbegs near Kara and Khan Zaman was killed during the battle while his kinsmen Bahadur Khan was captured and executed.
