= Ram Badan Singh =

Indian academic administrator

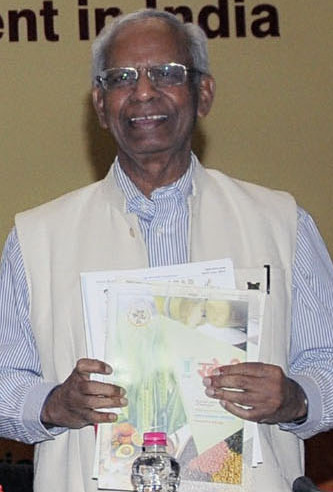
- Born: India
- Occupations: Agricultural scientist Academic
- Known for: Agricultural academics
- Awards: Padma Bhushan; BHU Distinguished Alumnus Award; Lal Bahadur Shastri Memorial International Scientist Award; Dr. Zhu Shoumin International College of Nutrition Award; CALS Distinguished Alumnus Award

Ram Badan Singh is an Indian agricultural scientist, academic and the chancellor of the Central Agricultural University.

He is the president of the National Academy of Agricultural Sciences. An alumnus of the College of Agriculture and Life Sciences of the New York State University and a holder of a doctoral degree in genetics, he is a former assistance director of the Food and Agriculture Organization and a former regional representative for Asia-Pacific region of the organization. He served as a member of the National Commission on Farmers and as the chairman of the Agricultural Scientist Recruitment Board, a Government of India agency. He is an elected fellow of the National Academy of Sciences, India and the National Academy of Agricultural Sciences and a recipients honors such as Banaras Hindu University Distinguished Alumnus Award, Lal Bahadur Shastri Memorial International Scientist Award, Dr. Zhu Shoumin International College of Nutrition Award and CALS Distinguished Alumnus Award. The Government of India awarded him the third highest civilian honour of the Padma Bhushan, in 2003, for his contributions to science.
