= Gaangi =

Gaangi is a small river of eastern Uttar Pradesh. This stream rises from village Are near Jaunpur, Uttar Pradesh and makes its way in a southeasterly direction through the clay lands along the borders of Jaunpur and Azamgarh. It forms the boundary between Karanda and Ghazipur and joins the Ganges near Mainpur. According to archaeologist A.C.L. Carlleyle, it may have been connected in antiquity by a river channel to the Gomati and Ganges rivers.
