= Basheer Khan Girls' Degree College =

Degree College for girls in Ghazipur, India

Baheer Khan Girls' Degree College
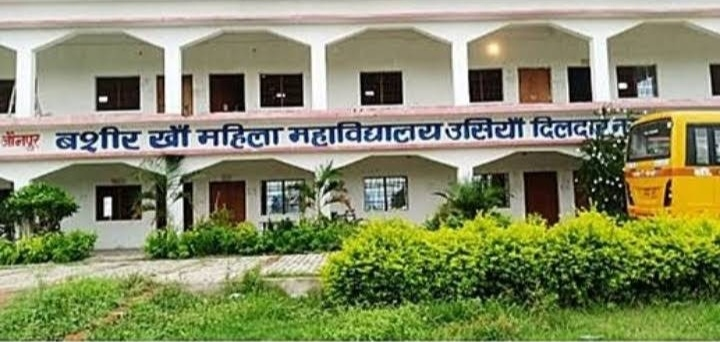
- Type: Private
- Established: 2012; 9 years ago
- Affiliations: Veer Bahadur Singh Purvanchal University (2017); University Grants Commission (India)(2017); Board of High School and Intermediate Education Uttar Pradesh(2017)
- President: Gulam Majhar Khan
- Students: 1000+
- Undergraduates: 520+
- Postgraduates: 340+
- Other students: 170+
- Location: Dildarnagar, Uttar Pradesh, India
- Campus: Rural, 3.7acres (1.497 ha)
- Website: https://bkmahilamahavidyalaya.org.in/contact-us.html

Basheer Khan Girls' Degree College is a Degree college for girls located in Usia village of Ghazipur district, Uttar Pradesh, India.

== Courses ==
- Bachelor of Arts
- Master of Arts
- Diploma
