= Ghazipur Ghat railway station =

Railway Station in Uttar Pradesh, India

General information
- Location: National Highway 31, Ghazipur, Uttar Pradesh; India
- Coordinates: 25.6000°N 83.6046°E
- Elevation: 74 m (243 ft)
- System: Indian Railways station
- Owner: Indian Railways
- Operator: North Eastern Railway
- Line: Varanasi–Chhapra line
- Platforms: 1
- Tracks: 1 BG
- Connections: Taxi stand, auto stand

Construction
- Structure type: Standard (on-ground station)
- Parking: Available
- Cycle facilities: Available
- Accessible: Disabled access

Other information
- Status: Active
- Station code: GZT
- Zone(s): North Eastern Railway
- Division(s): Varanasi
Location
- Location within India Location within Uttar Pradesh

Ghazipur Ghat railway station is a small railway station in Ghazipur district, Uttar Pradesh. Its code is GZT. It serves Ghazipur Rural Area. The station consists of 1 platform. The platform is not well sheltered. It lacks many facilities including water and sanitation.

== See also ==
- Varanasi Junction railway station
- Ghazipur City railway station
