= Qasimabad Fort =

Fort in India

Qasimabad fort
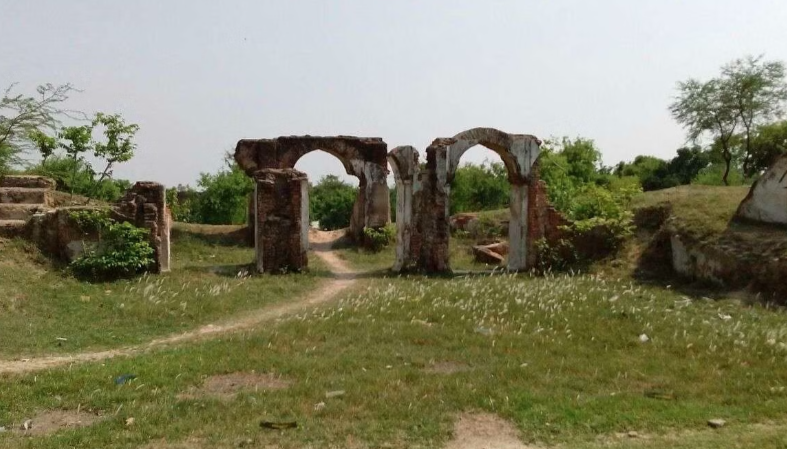
- The remains of Qasimabad fort built by Nawab Sheikh Abdullah in memory of his father Nawab Sheikh Muhammad Qasim.

- Location within Uttar Pradesh Location within India
- 25.7889647°N 83.6700072°E
- Location: Ghazipur, Uttar Pradesh

History
- Built: 1742-1743
- Built for: Nawab Sheikh Abdullah

Site notes
- Area: 17 acres (6.9 ha)
- Architectural styles: Mughal, & British
- Owner: Nawab Sheikh Abdullah and his descendants (1742-1952); Government (1952-....)

Qasimabad fort also known as Nawab Muhammad Qasim Fort. It was built by Nawab Sheikh Abdullah in 1742. The fort is located in the town of Kasimabad, of Ghazipur District, Uttar Pradesh, India.
