= Latiya (village) =

Latiya is a village in the district of Siddharth Nagar, Uttar Pradesh, India.
