= Zahurabad, Ghazipur =

Jahurabad Jahurabad
- Village
- Location in Uttar Pradesh, India
- Coordinates: 25°44′44″N 83°42′22″E
- Country: India
- State: Uttar Pradesh
- District: Ghazipur
- Established: 1526; 500 years ago
- Founder: NA

Government
  - Type: Panchayati Raj (India)
  - Body: Gram Pradhan

Area
  - Total: 630.43 ha (1,557.8 acres)
- Elevation: 70 m (230 ft)

Population (2011)
  - Total: 6,541
  - Density: 1,038/km^{2} (2,687/sq mi)
- Demonym: Jahurabadi

Languages
  - Official: Bhojpuri, Hindi
- Time zone: UTC+5:30 (IST)
- PIN: 233222
- Telephone code: 05497
- Vehicle registration: UP 61

Jahurabad is a village and a block in Kasimabad, Ghazipur tehsil of Ghazipur District, Uttar Pradesh, India. Jahurabad also gives its name to the Jahurabad Assembly Constituency. Jahurabad was a Jagir and was ruled by the family of Nawab Sheikh Abdullah, the family of Jahurabad, Bahadurganj and Qasimabad. As per 1901 Census of India Jahurabad pargana had a total population of 69589 and was spread over 79868 acres.

== History ==
During Mughals and British Jahurabad was a jagir and was also a capital of Jahurabad estate. Later, it became a pargana and had an area of 79868 acres. The Jahurabad was primarily populated by large population of Pathans. The population of Jahurabad village in year 1881 was 1502 later, in 1891 it dropped to 1463 and in year 1901 it was 1271 of whom 556 were Muslims. The total geographical area of the village in 1901 was 445 acres which consisted of Jahurabad, Mustafabad, Shakarpur Kurd and was kept on a revenue demand of rupees 721 in year 1908. Where as, the total land spread of Jahurabad Village was 24,337 acres which was one of the largest zamindari villages in Uttar Pradesh.
