= Suhaildev Superfast Express =

Train in India

Ghazipur City-Anand Vihar Terminal Suhaildev Superfast Express (via Lucknow)

Overview
- Service type: Superfast
- First service: 13 April 2016; 10 years ago
- Current operator: Northern Railway

Route
- Termini: Ghazipur City (GCT); Anand Vihar Terminal (ANVT)
- Stops: 10
- Distance travelled: 815 km (506 mi)
- Average journey time: 14h 40m
- Service frequency: 4 Days a Week
- Train number: 22419 / 22420

On-board services
- Classes: AC 2 Tier, AC 3 Tier, Sleeper Class, General Unreserved
- Seating arrangements: Yes
- Sleeping arrangements: Yes
- Catering facilities: On-board catering E-catering
- Observation facilities: Large windows
- Baggage facilities: No
- Other facilities: Below the seats

Technical
- Rolling stock: LHB coach
- Track gauge: 1,676 mm (5 ft 6 in)
- Operating speed: 56 km/h (35 mph) average including halts.

The 22419 / 22420 Ghazipur City-Anand Vihar Terminal Suhaildev Superfast Express (via Lucknow) is a Superfast Express train belonging to Northern Railway zone that runs between Ghazipur City and Anand Vihar Terminal in India. It is currently being operated with 22419/22420 train numbers on four days in a week basis.

The train is named after Suhaildev, a legendary king from Shravasti.

== Coach composition ==
The train has standard LHB rake with max speed of 130 kmph. The train consists of 21 coaches :

- 1 AC First Class
- 2 AC Second Class
- 4 AC Third Class
- 2 AC Third Economy
- 6 Sleeper
- 4 General
- 1 Seating-cum-Luggage Rake
- 1 End-On Generation

== Incidents ==
On October 31, the Suheldev Pasi Superfast Express, on the route from Ghazipur City to Anand Vihar in Delhi, suffered a derailment incident in the outer region of Prayagraj, Uttar Pradesh. No injuries were reported.

== Route & halts ==
- Ghazipur City
- Aunrihar Junction
- Jaunpur Junction
- Zafarabad Junction
- Sultanpur Junction
- Lucknow Charbagh
- Bareilly Junction
- Moradabad Junction
- Ghaziabad Junction
- Anand Vihar Terminal.

== Traction ==
It is hauled by a Ghaziabad Loco Shed-based WAP-7 electric locomotive from Ghazipur City to Anand Vihar Terminal and vice versa.

== Rake sharing ==
22433/22434 Ghazipur City-Anand Vihar Terminal Suhaildev Superfast Express (via Prayagraj).

== Direction reversal ==
The 22419/22420 reverses its direction once at:

- Zafarabad Junction.

== See also ==
- Ghazipur City railway station
- Anand Vihar Terminal railway station
- Sadbhawna Express
- Ghazipur City–Anand Vihar Terminal Express

== Notes ==
it's started in the name of maharaja suheldev vasudev pasi
