= Kasimabad, Ghazipur =

Kasimabad
- Town and Tehsil
- Location in Uttar Pradesh, India
- Coordinates: 25.787°N 83.672°E
- Country: India
- State: Uttar Pradesh
- District: Ghazipur
- Established: 1730; 296 years ago
- Founder: Sheikh Muhammad Qasim

Government
  - Type: Nagar Palika Parishad

Area
  - Total: 2,059.27 ha (5,088.6 acres)

Population (2011)
  - Total: 10,557
  - Density: 512.66/km^{2} (1,327.8/sq mi)

Languages
  - Official: Hindi
- Time zone: UTC+5:30 (IST)
- PIN: 233227
- Vehicle registration: UP-61

Kasimabad is a town and a tehsil in Ghazipur District of Uttar Pradesh, India. Qasimabad also served as the capital of Qasimabad Estate.

== See also ==
- Qasimabad Fort
