= Bareilly =

City in Uttar Pradesh, India

- City
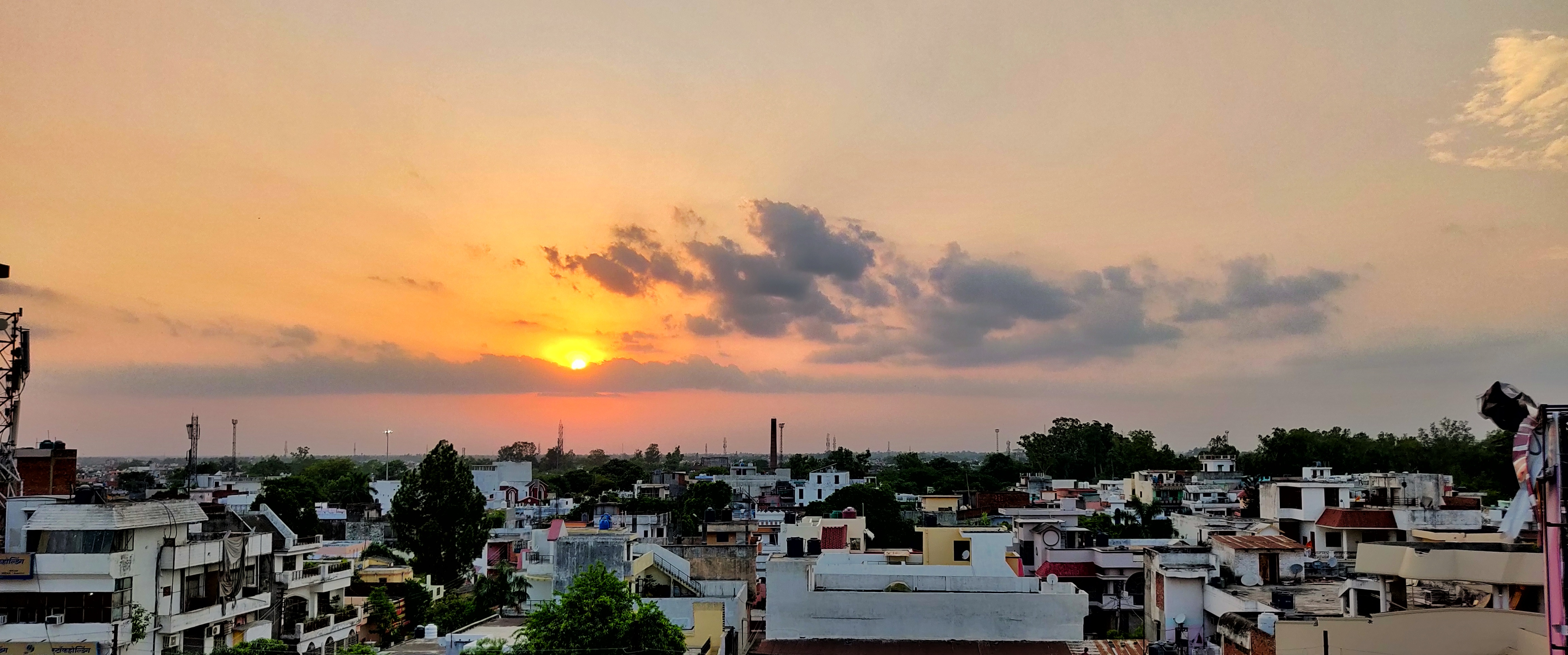
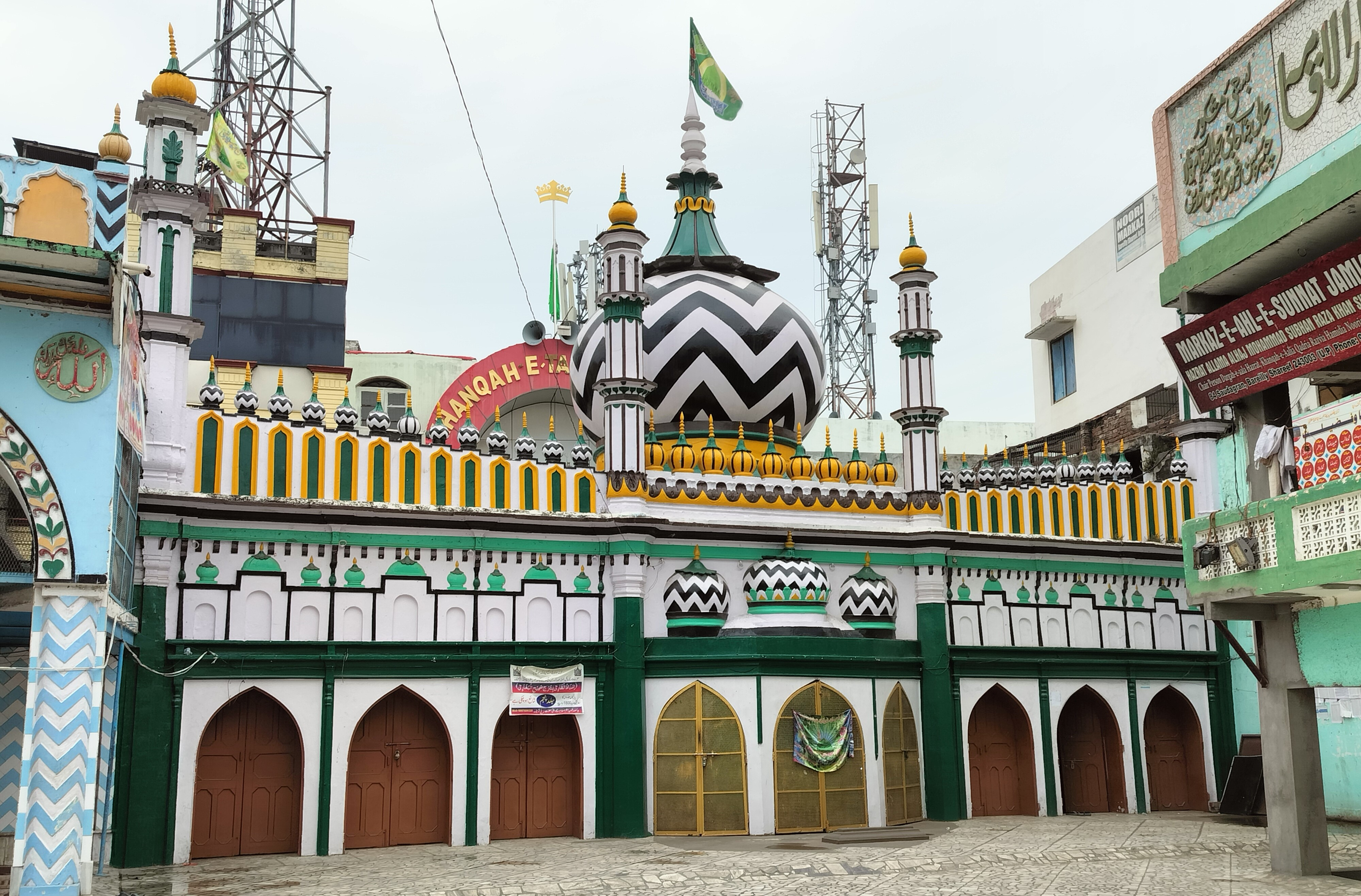
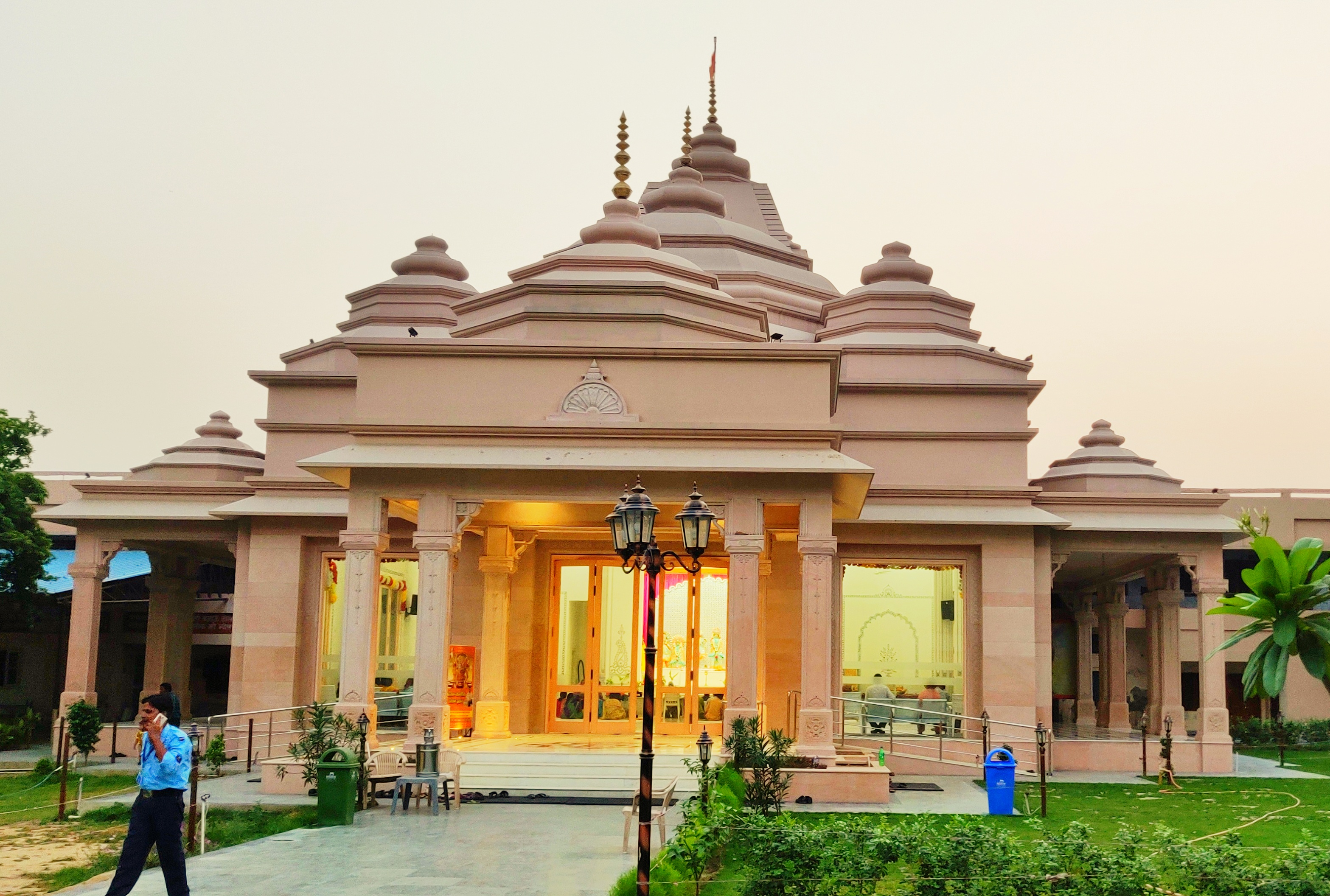
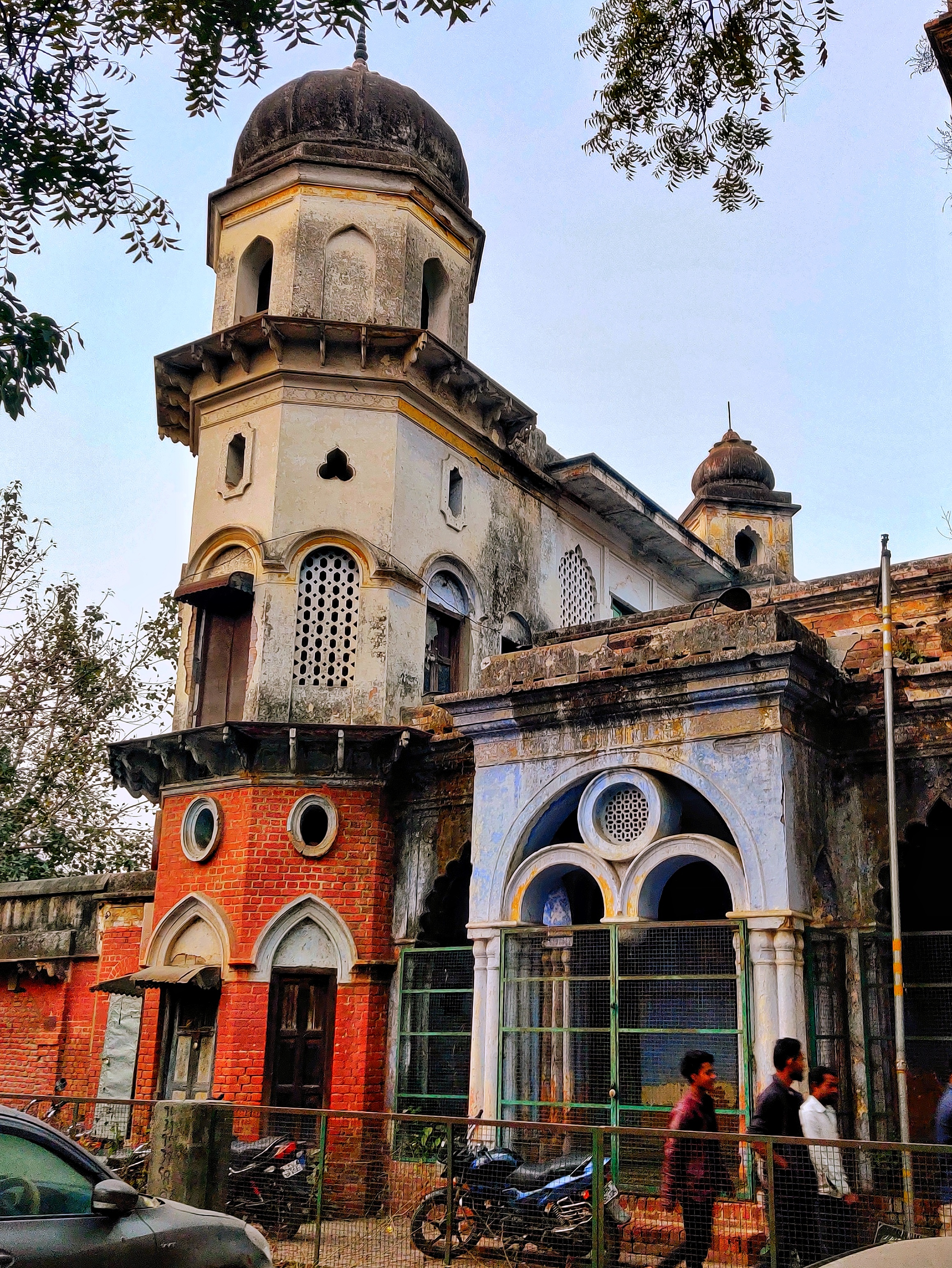
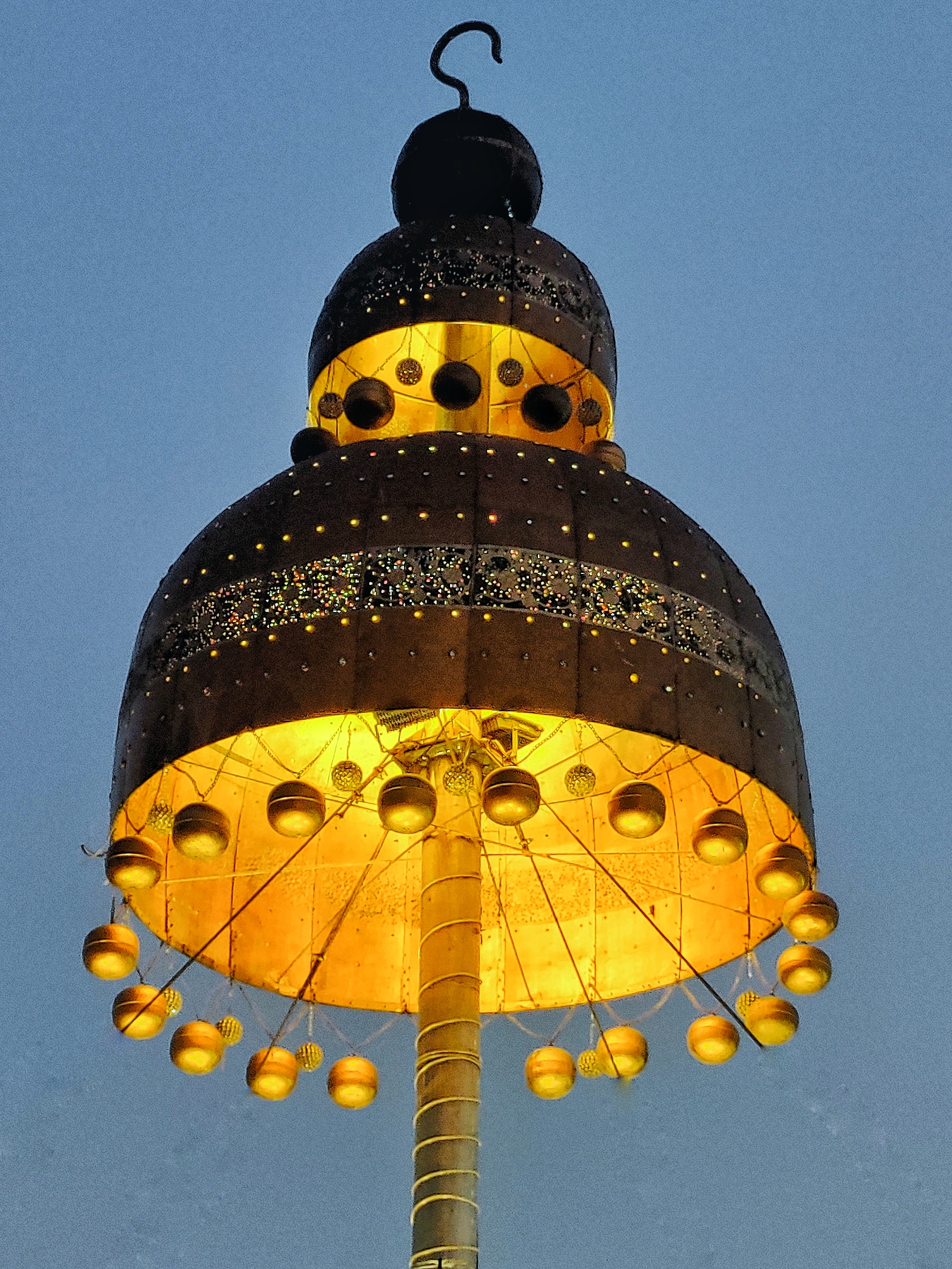
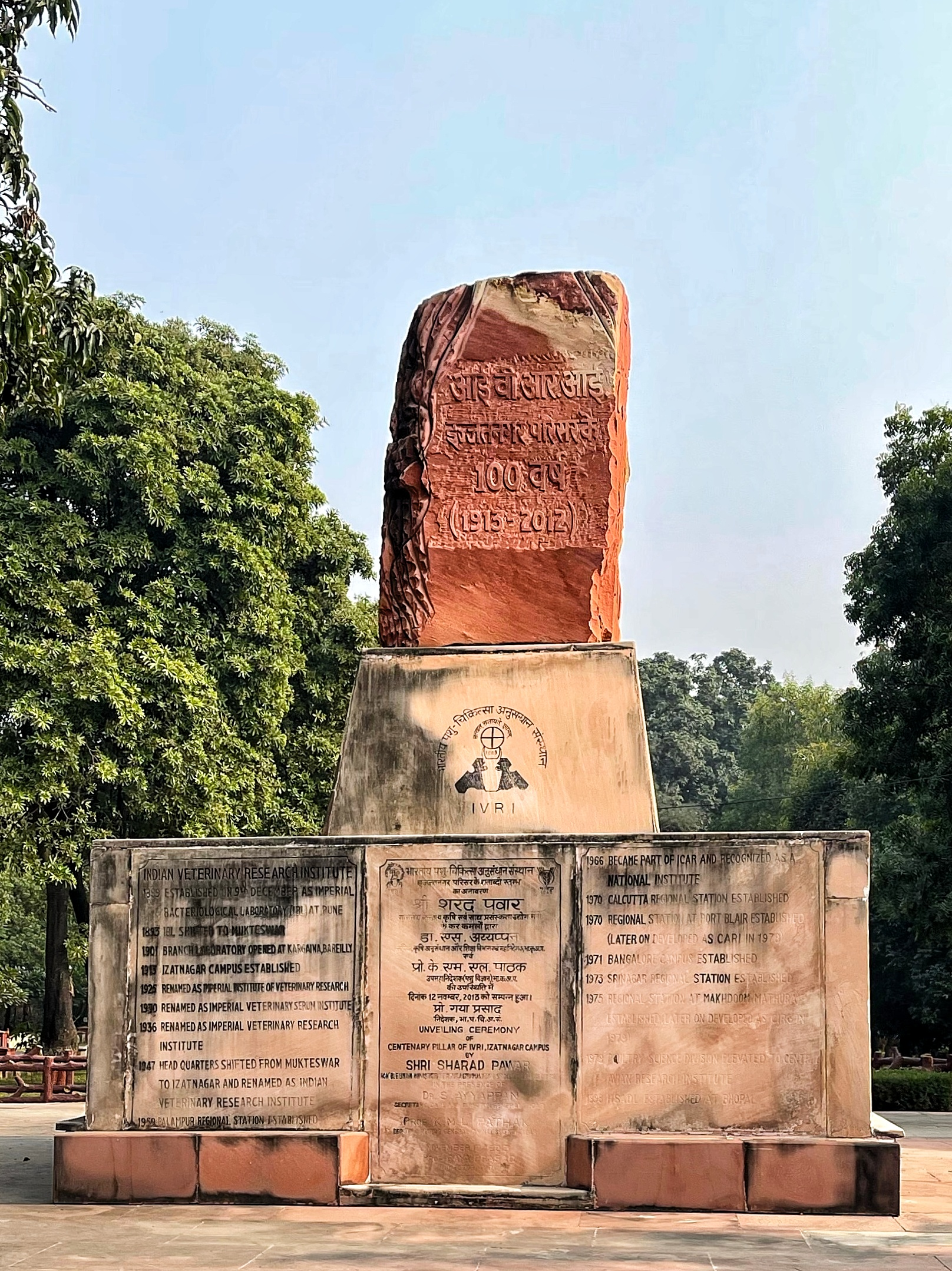
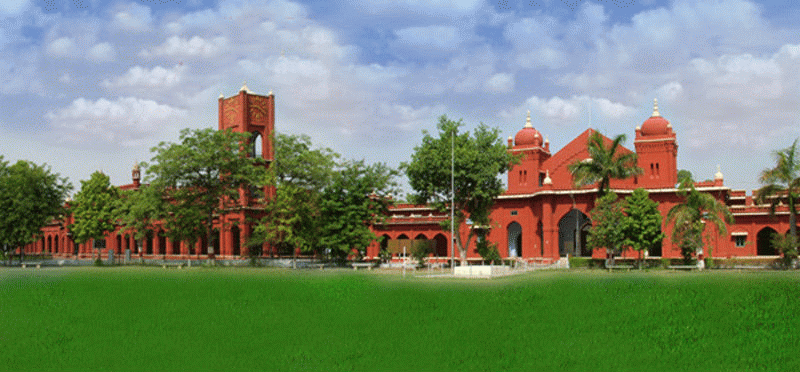
- Top to bottom; Left to right: Civil Lines cityscape, Bareilly Dargah, Anand Ashram Temple, a dharamshala near Bareilly Junction, Bareilly ka Jhumka, Memorial at IVRI Izzatnagar and Bareilly College
- Nicknames: Nath Nagri
- Interactive map of Bareilly
- Location within Uttar Pradesh Location within India
- Coordinates: 28°22′00″N 79°25′50″E
- Country: India
- State: Uttar Pradesh
- District: Bareilly
- Founded: 1537
- Founder: Jagat Singh Katehriya

Government
  - Type: Municipal Corporation
  - Body: Bareilly Municipal Corporation
  - Mayor: Umesh Gautam (BJP)
  - Lok Sabha MP: Chhatrapal Singh Gangwar (BJP)
  - MLA: Arun Kumar (City); Sanjeev Agarwal (Cantonment)

Area
  - City: 106 km^{2} (41 sq mi)
  - Metro: 123 km^{2} (47 sq mi)
- Elevation: 268 m (879 ft)

Population (2011)
  - City: 903,668
  - Density: 8,530/km^{2} (22,100/sq mi)
  - Metro: 985,752
  - Sex ratio: 895 ♀/1,000 ♂
- Demonym: Bareillite

Language
  - Official: Hindi
  - Additional official: Urdu

GDP (2021)
  - Nominal GDP (Metro): ₹46681 crore US$5.93 billion
  - Share in UP GDP: ~2.68%
  - Share in India GDP: ~0.21%
  - GDP Rank (India): 48th
- Time zone: UTC+5:30 (IST)
- PIN codes: 2430xx
- Vehicle registration: UP-25
- Website: bareilly.nic.in

Bareilly, (Note: Hindi: Barēlī, pronounced [bəɾeːliː]) also spelled Bareli, is a city in Bareilly district in the Indian state of Uttar Pradesh. It is among the largest metropolises in Western Uttar Pradesh and is the centre of the Bareilly division as well as the historical region of Rohilkhand. The city lies in the Indo-Gangetic Plains, about 252 kilometres (157 mi) northwest of the state capital, Lucknow, and 265 kilometres (165 mi) east of the national capital, New Delhi. With a population of 903,668 in 2011, it is the eighth most populous city in the state, 17th in northern India and 54th in India. It is located on the bank of Ramganga River and is the site of the Ramganga Barrage built for canal irrigation.

The earliest settlement in what is now Bareilly was established in 1537 by a local chieftain Jagat Singh Katehriya who named it 'Bans-Bareli' after his two sons Bansaldev and Bareldev. The town came under the rule of the Mughals in 1569 and had become the capital of a local pargana by 1596. The foundation of the modern city of Bareilly was laid by Mughal governor Mukrand Rai in 1657, and in 1658 it became the seat of the governor of Budaun. The weakening of Mughal Empire lead to the rise of the Kingdom of Rohilkhand, of which Bareilly was a major centre. The city came under the control of Oudh State in 1774 after the fall of Rohillas in the First Rohilla War and was then ceded to the British East India Company by the Nawab of Oudh in 1801. A Military station was established in 1811 to the south of the city, where a fort was constructed in 1816. Bareilly was freed by the rebels during the Indian Rebellion of 1857 and remained independent under the rule of Khan Bahadur Khan until it was re-annexed by the British in 1858.

Bareilly is renowned for being the place of origin of the Barelvi movement, a Sunni Islamic movement formed by Islamic scholar Ahmad Raza Khan to counter the growing influence of the Deobandi movement and Wahhabism. His shrine, located at the Bareilly Dargah, is visited by millions of his followers every year on the occasion of Urs-e-Razavi.

The city has been known as Nath Nagri due to the presence of several ancient Shiva temples, and more recently as Jumka City. It is a centre for furniture manufacturing and trade in cotton, cereal and sugar. Bareilly is one of the 100 Smart Cities being developed in India, and one of the nine counter magnet cities of the National Capital Region (NCR). The city is served by the Bareilly Airport which has direct flights to Delhi, Lucknow, Mumbai and Bangalore. The Bareilly Junction railway station located in the city is among the top 100 booking stations of Indian Railways while Izzatnagar is the divisional headquarters of one of the three divisions of North Eastern Railways.

== History ==
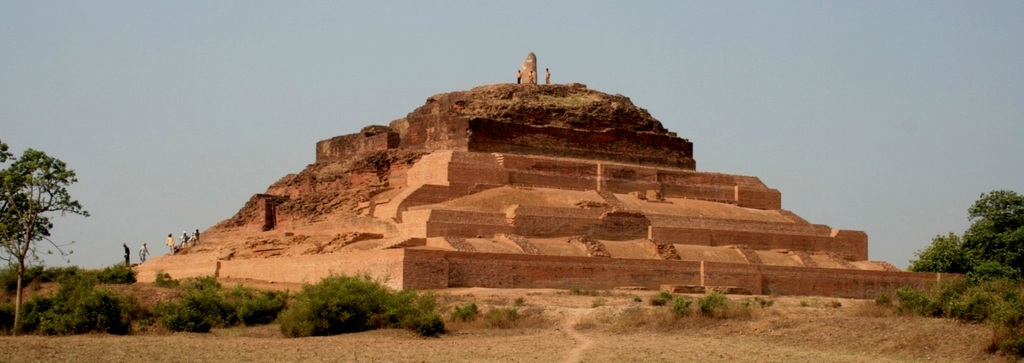
Ahichchhatra (or Ahi-Kshetra) was the ancient capital of Northern Panchala. The remains of this city have been discovered in Bareilly

According to the epic Mahābhārata, the Bareilly region (Panchala) is said to be the birthplace of Draupadi, who was also referred to as 'Panchali' (one from the kingdom of Panchāla) by Kṛṣṇā (Lord Krishna). When Yudhishthira becomes the king of Hastinapur at the end of the Mahābhārata, Draupadi becomes his queen. The folklore says that Gautama Buddha had once visited the ancient fortress city of Ahichchhatra in Bareilly. The Jain Tirthankara Parshva is said to have attained Kaivalya at Ahichchhatra.

In the 12th century, the kingdom was under the rule by different clans of Kshatriya Rajputs. Later, the region became part of the Muslim Turkic Delhi Sultanate for 325 years before getting absorbed in the emerging Mughal Empire. The foundation of the modern City of Bareilly foundation was laid by Mughal governor Mukrand Rai in 1657 during the rule of Mughal Emperor Aurangzeb. Later the region became the capital of Rohilkhand region before getting handed over to Nawab Vazir of Awadh and then to East India Company (transferred to British India) and later becoming an integral part of India. The region has also acted as a mint for a major part of its history.

From an archaeological point of view, the district of Bareilly is very rich. The extensive remains of Ahichchhatra, the Capital town of Northern Panchala have been discovered near Ramnagar village of Aonla Tehsil in the district. It was during the first excavations at Ahichchhatra (1940–44) that the painted grey ware, associated with the advent of the Aryans in the Ganges–Yamuna Valley, was recognised for the first time in the earliest levels of the site. Nearly five thousand coins belonging to periods earlier than that of the Guptas have been yielded from Ahichchhatra. It has also been one of the richest sites in India from the point of view of the total yield of terracotta. Some of the masterpieces of Indian terracotta art are from Ahichchhatra. In fact the classification made of the terracotta human figurines from Ahichchhatra on grounds of style and to some extent stratigraphy became a model for determining the stratigraphy of subsequent excavations at other sites in the Ganges Valley. On the basis of the existing material, the archaeology of the region helps us to get an idea of the cultural sequence from the beginning of the 2nd millennium BC up to the 11th century AD. Some ancient mounds in the district have also been discovered by the Deptt. of Ancient History and culture, Rohilkhand University, at Tihar-Khera (Fatehganj West), Pachaumi, Rahtuia, Kadarganj and Sainthal. Apart from this, artefacts of painted grey ware culture of the Iron Age have also been discovered near the city.

=== Establishment ===
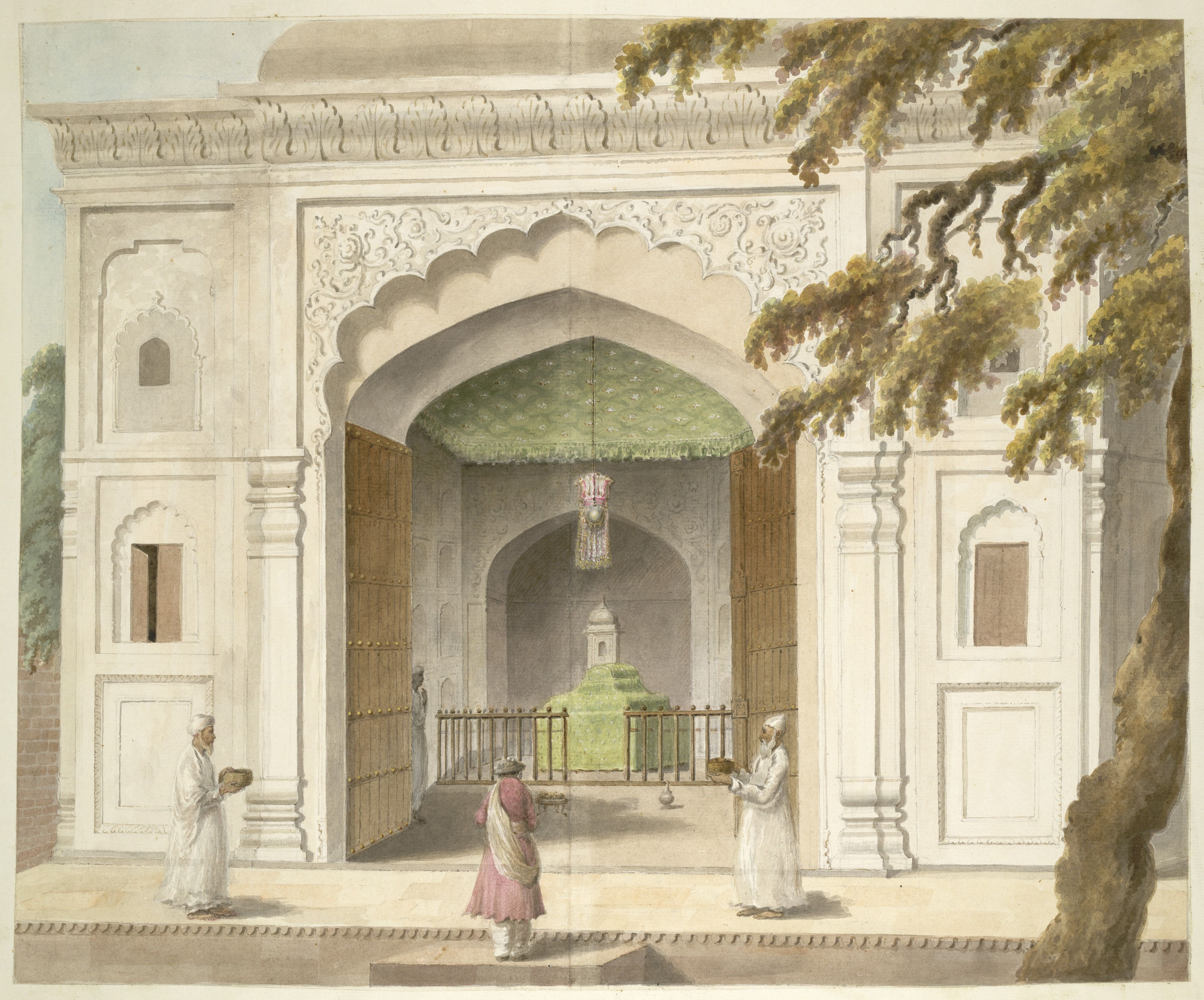
The mausoleum of Hafiz Rahmat Khan at Bareilly, 1814-15

Bareilly was founded in 1537 by Jagat Singh Katehriya, a Rajput who named it Bareilly after his two sons Bansaldev and Baraldev. The city was mentioned by the historian Budayuni. The foundation of the modern city of Bareilly was laid by Mughal governor Mukrand Rai in 1657. In 1658, Bareilly became the headquarters of the province of Budaun. The Mughals encouraged the settlements of loyal Afghans (Pathans) in the Bareilly region to control the native Katehriya Rajputs. After the death of Emperor Aurangzeb, the Afghans began to settle in the villages and assimilated with the local Muslims. These descendants of these assimilated Afghans are known as Pathans. After the fall of the Mughal Empire, created anarchy and many Pathans migrated from the Rohilkhand region. Bareilly (like other cities in Uttar Pradesh) experienced economic stagnation and poverty due to the breakdown of trade and security, leading to the migration of Rohilla Muslim Pathans to Suriname and Guyana as indentured labour.

=== British East India Company ===
Under Hafiz Rahmat Khan Barech at the 1761 Third Battle of Panipat, Rohilkhand blocked the expansion of the Maratha Empire into northern India. In 1772 it was invaded by the Marathas, repulsing the invasion with the aid of the Nawab of Awadh. After the war, Nawab Shuja-ud-Daula demanded payment for the nawabs' help from Barech. When his demand was refused, the nawab joined the East India Company (under Governor Warren Hastings and his Commander-in-Chief, Alexander Champion) to invade Rohilkhand. The combined forces of Daula and the Company defeated Barech (who was killed in battle at Miranpur Katra, ending Rohilla rule) in 1774. Rohilkhand was handed over to Daula, and from 1774 to 1800 the province was ruled by the Nawab of Awadh who surrendered Rohilkhand to the East India Company in a treaty signed on 10 November 1801. During the reign of Shah Alam II, Bareilly was the headquarters of Rohilla Sardar Hafiz Rehmat Khan and many coins were minted. The city was later in the possession of Awadh Nawab Asaf-ud-Daulah, and his coins had Bareilly, Bareilly Aasfabad and the Bareilly kite and fish as identification marks. Coins were then minted by the East India Company.

=== Modern period ===
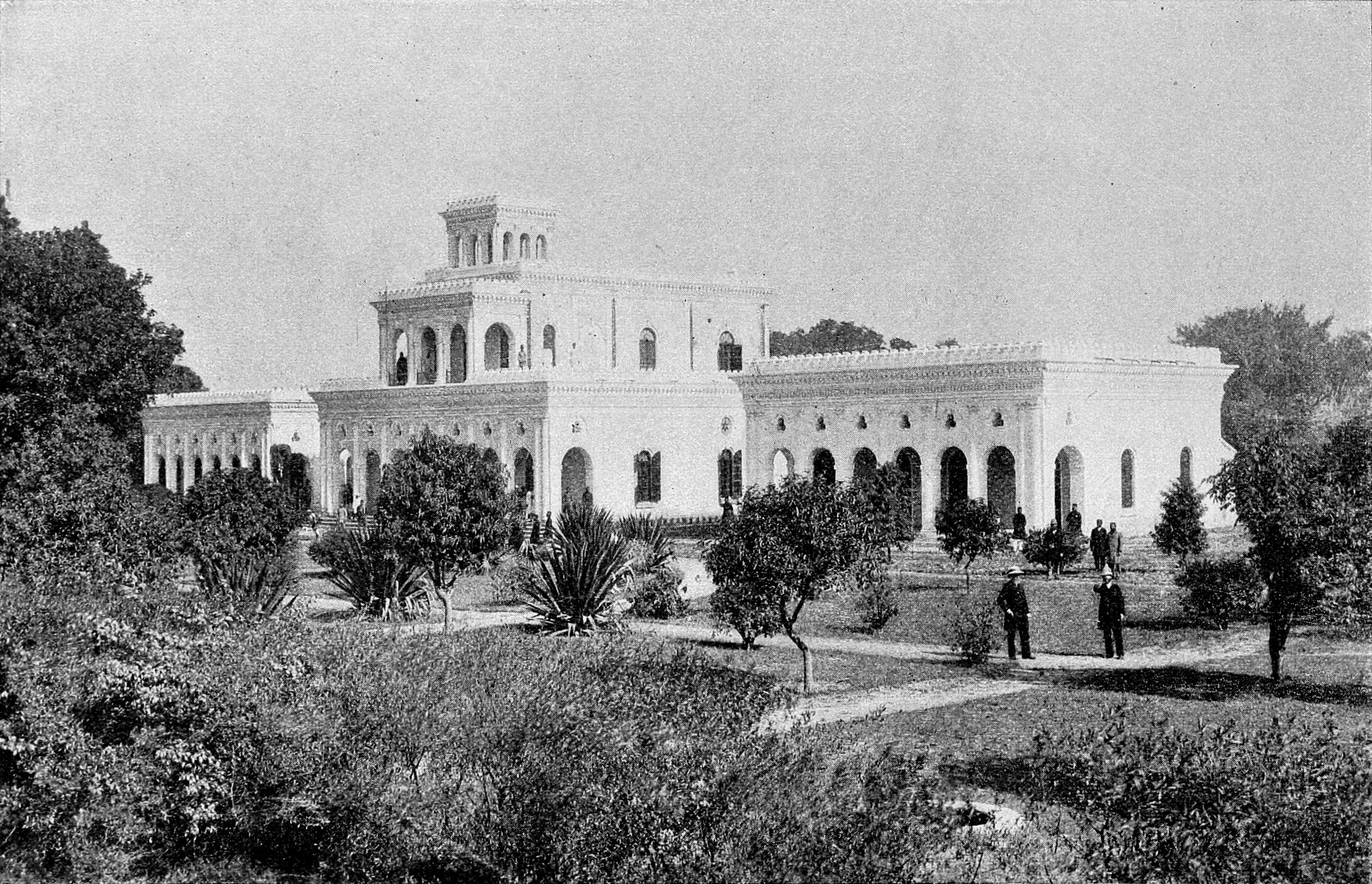
Theological Seminary at Bareilly, 1895

After the Rohilla War, the change in the power structure increased discontent throughout the district.

The most popular trades in and around Bareilly during the 1820s were manufacturing glass, jewellery, glass and lac bangles and gold and silver thread, crimping, bean drying, wire drawing, charpoy weaving, keeping a grocer's shop and selling kebabs.

==== Rebellion of 1857 ====
Bareilly was a centre of the Indian Rebellion of 1857. The rebellion began as a mutiny of Indian soldiers (sepoys), employed in the three Presidency armies, against race- and religion-based injustices and inequities on 10 May 1857 in Meerut. It expanded into other mutinies and civilian rebellions, primarily in the major north-central Indian river valleys; local episodes extended northwest to Peshawar (on the northwest frontier with Afghanistan) and southeast (beyond Delhi). There were riots in many parts of Uttar Pradesh, and Muslims in Bareilly, Bijnor and Moradabad called for the revival of a Muslim kingdom.

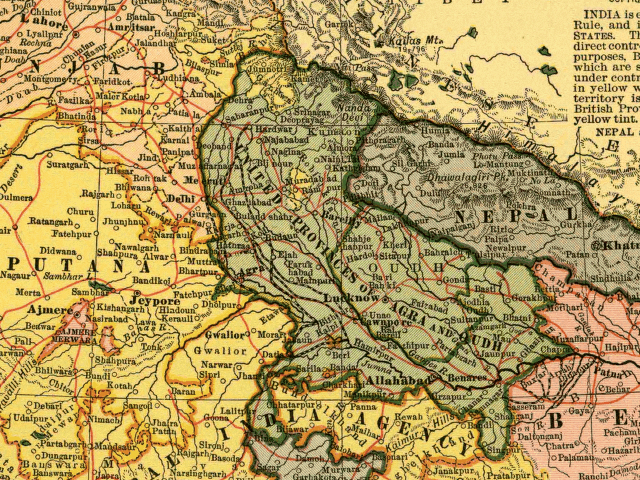
Bareilly was made part of the United Provinces of Agra and Oudh.

The Rohillas actively opposed the British, but were later disarmed. Khan Bahadur Khan Rohilla, grandson of Hafiz Rahmat Khan, formed his own government in Bareilly in 1857 and a widespread popular revolt in Awadh, Bundelkhand and Rohilkhand took place. In 1857, Khan Bhadur Khan issued silver coins from Bareilly as an independent ruler. When the rebellion failed, Bareilly was subjugated. Khan Bahadur Khan was sentenced to death, and hanged in the police station on 24 February 1860.

=== Independence ===
Bareilly Central Jail housed a number of political prisoners who supported the independence movement including Yashpal (who married while imprisoned on 7 August 1936 was the first such ceremony in an Indian jail). The rules were changed, preventing future prison marriages.

== Geography ==
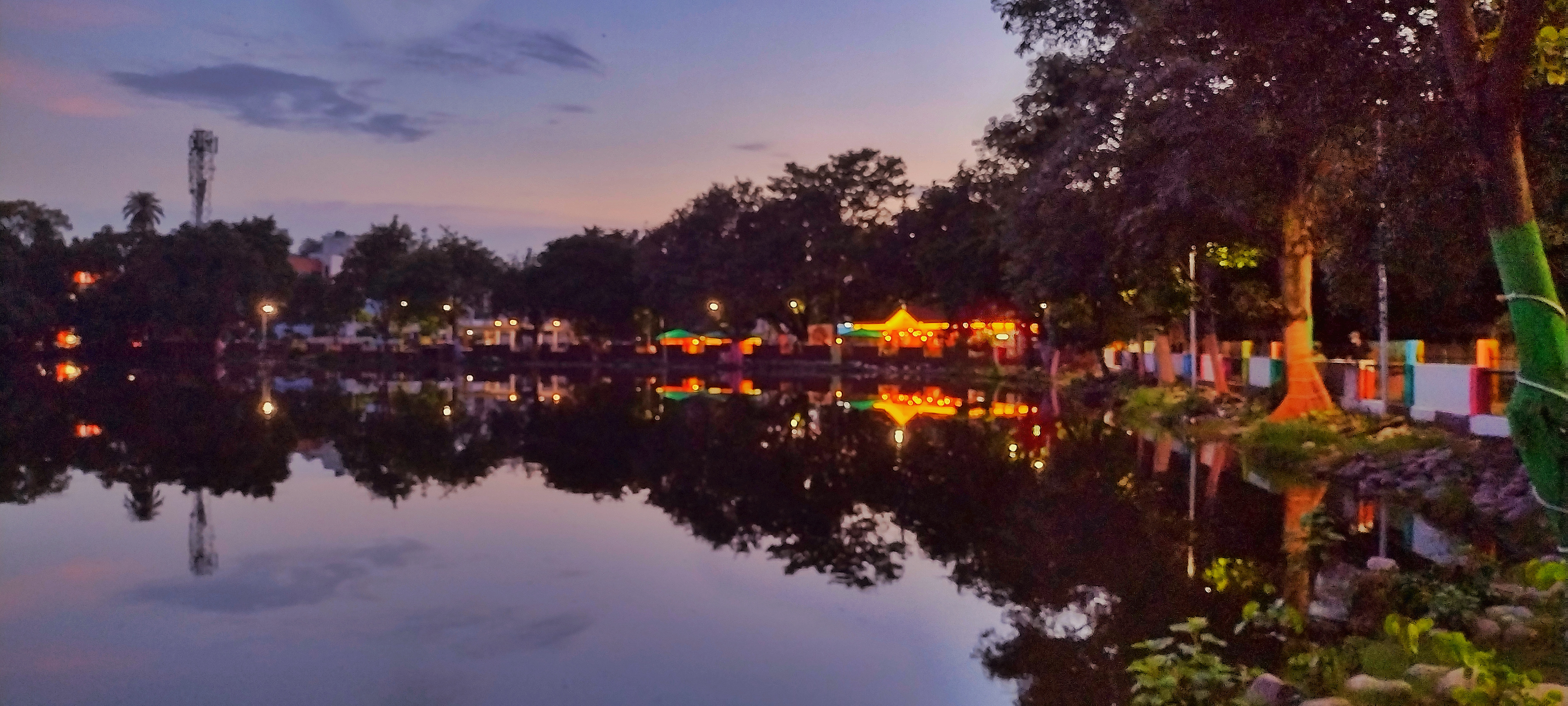
Akshar Vihar - a lake in Civil Lines, Bareilly

Bareilly is in northern India, at 28°10′N 78°23′E. On its east are Pilibhit and Shahjahanpur, Rampur on the west, Udham Singh Nagar (Uttarakhand) to the north and Badaun to the south. The city is level and well-watered, sloping towards the south. Its soil is fertile, with groves of trees. A rain forest in the north, known as the tarai, contains tigers, bears, deer and wild pigs. The river Sarda (or Gogra) forms the eastern boundary and is the principal waterway. The Ramganga receives most of the drainage from the Kumaon mountains, and the Deoha also receives many small streams. The Gomati (or Gumti) is also nearby.

Bareilly lies 252 metres (827 ft) above sea level, and is located off the left bank of Ramganga. Deoranian, Nakatiya and Shankha, all minor tributaries of Ramganga, flow through the city. The historical core of Bareilly lies approx 10 kilometres (6.2 mi) to the left of Ramganga. Since the 19th century, the city has been expanding to the south, with neighbourhoods like Civil Lines and Bareilly Cantt established during British rule; however, after the Independence of India, much of the expansion has been towards the north of the old city. Smaller industrial centres founded during British rule, like C.B. Ganj and Izzatnagar, also merged with the city. The city has an urban area of 106 square kilometres (41 sq mi), while together with its metropolitan area it covers 123 square kilometres (47 sq mi).

=== Climate ===
Bareilly has a humid subtropical climate (Köppen climate classification: Cwa) with hot summers and cool winters. The average temperature for the year is 25 °C. June, with an average temperature of 32.8 °C is the warmest month, while the coolest month of the year is January, with an average temperature of 15 °C. Bareilly receives 1038.9 mm precipitation for the year on average. The month with the most precipitation on average is July with 307.3 mm of precipitation, while November is the month with the least precipitation on average, with an average of 5.1 mm. There are an average of 37.7 days of precipitation, with the most precipitation occurring in August with 10.3 days and the least precipitation occurring in November with 0.5 days. The summer is noticeably wetter than the winter, although rain falls throughout the year.

Climate data for Bareilly (1991–2020, extremes 1901–2020)
Month	Jan	Feb	Mar	Apr	May	Jun	Jul	Aug	Sep	Oct	Nov	Dec	Year
Record high °C (°F)	29.4 (84.9)	34.0 (93.2)	41.6 (106.9)	45.5 (113.9)	46.7 (116.1)	47.3 (117.1)	46.0 (114.8)	40.6 (105.1)	38.7 (101.7)	38.3 (100.9)	36.1 (97.0)	30.0 (86.0)	47.3 (117.1)
Mean daily maximum °C (°F)	19.6 (67.3)	24.7 (76.5)	30.7 (87.3)	37.0 (98.6)	39.2 (102.6)	37.8 (100.0)	33.8 (92.8)	33.2 (91.8)	32.9 (91.2)	32.2 (90.0)	28.0 (82.4)	22.4 (72.3)	30.9 (87.6)
Daily mean °C (°F)	14.1 (57.4)	18.2 (64.8)	23.8 (74.8)	29.6 (85.3)	32.3 (90.1)	32.2 (90.0)	29.9 (85.8)	29.7 (85.5)	29.0 (84.2)	25.9 (78.6)	20.8 (69.4)	16.3 (61.3)	25.2 (77.3)
Mean daily minimum °C (°F)	8.4 (47.1)	11.6 (52.9)	16.1 (61.0)	21.6 (70.9)	25.1 (77.2)	26.7 (80.1)	26.2 (79.2)	25.9 (78.6)	24.5 (76.1)	20.0 (68.0)	14.3 (57.7)	9.7 (49.5)	19.1 (66.4)
Record low °C (°F)	−1.3 (29.7)	0.0 (32.0)	4.0 (39.2)	11.1 (52.0)	16.1 (61.0)	18.5 (65.3)	17.4 (63.3)	20.5 (68.9)	16.7 (62.1)	8.9 (48.0)	5.1 (41.2)	0.1 (32.2)	−1.3 (29.7)
Average rainfall mm (inches)	26.5 (1.04)	31.4 (1.24)	20.9 (0.82)	16.1 (0.63)	31.7 (1.25)	126.0 (4.96)	364.6 (14.35)	318.8 (12.55)	206.8 (8.14)	32.7 (1.29)	2.8 (0.11)	8.3 (0.33)	1,186.5 (46.71)
Average rainy days	1.7	2.3	1.9	1.5	2.2	5.5	12.1	11.9	7.4	1.2	0.3	0.6	48.6
Average relative humidity (%) (at 17:30 IST)	69	55	43	29	32	49	72	76	72	60	63	69	57
Source 1: India Meteorological Department
Source 2: Tokyo Climate Center (mean temperatures 1991–2020)

Bareily has been ranked 17th best "National Clean Air City" under (Category 2 3-10L Population cities) in India according to 'Swachh Vayu Survekshan 2024 Results'

=== Environment and cityscape ===
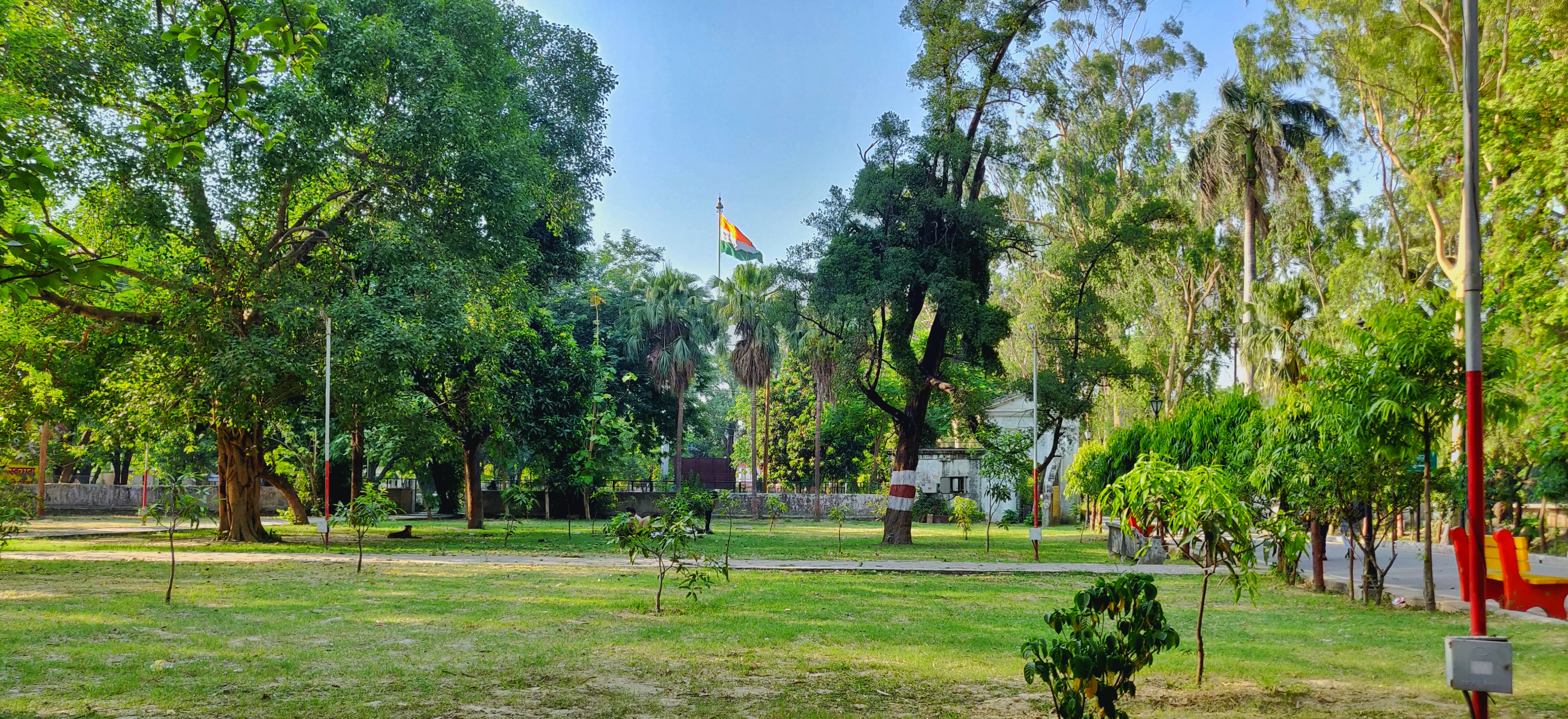
Gandhi Udyan, previously called the Company Garden was established during the British Raj in Civil Lines

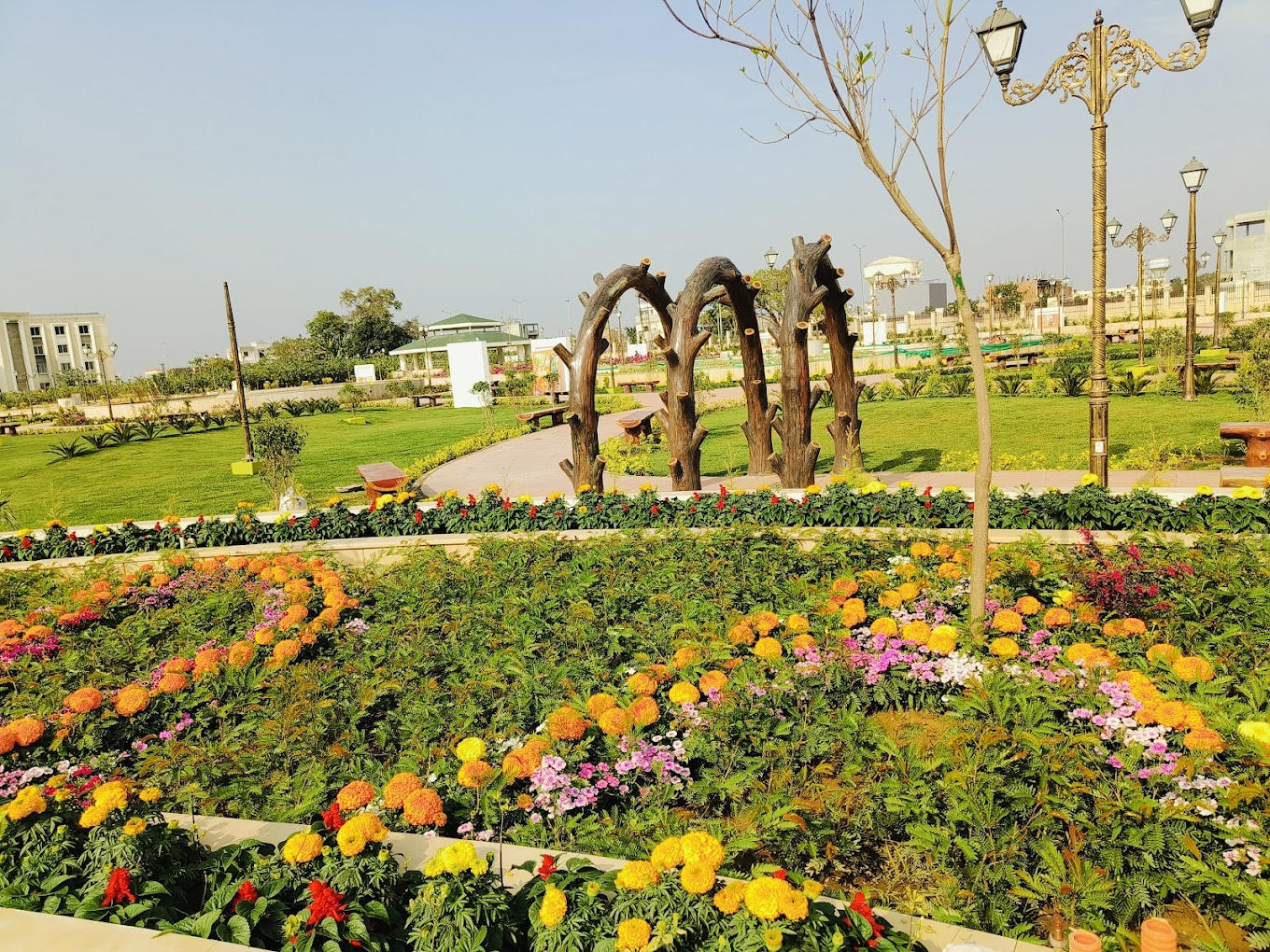
Ramayan Vatika Sector 2

The street system in Bareilly is traditional, with most roads oriented towards different cities. The city centre is the intersection of Nainital Road and Bada Bazaar–Shyam Ganj Road at a street known as Kutubkhana. It is a congested street, and the entry of cars or heavy vehicles is prohibited during the day. The Patel Chowk Choraha–Chaupla and Chowki Chauraha–Chaupla Roads run from Lucknow Road to Delhi Road (Old National Highway 24). Nainital Road (including the old National Highway 74 or Pilibhit By-pass Road) and Badaun Road began at Kutubkhana. Heavy traffic is allowed on these roads only from Koharapeer Sabji-Mandi and Chaupla Crossroads. Bareilly is on the Ganges plain, with fertile alluvial soil; however, the lower plain is flood-prone. The city is on the Ramganga, with seven other rivers passing through the district. The lower Himalayas are 40 kilometres (25 mi) north of the river.

== Demographics ==
Historical Population of Bareilly
Year	Pop.	±%
1847	92,208	—
1853	101,507	+10.1%
1865	105,649	+4.1%
1872	102,982	−2.5%
1881	113,417	+10.1%
1891	121,039	+6.7%
1901	133,167	+10.0%
1911	129,462	−2.8%
1921	129,459	−0.0%
1931	144,031	+11.3%
1941	192,688	+33.8%
1951	208,083	+8.0%
1961	272,828	+31.1%
1971	326,106	+19.5%
1981	449,425	+37.8%
1991	590,661	+31.4%
2001	720,315	+22.0%
2011	903,668	+25.5%
Source: 1847-1865 - Bareilly district Gazetteer 1911; 1872-1891 – Imperial Gazetteer of India; 1901-2011 - District Census Handbook Bareilly

According to the 2011 Indian Census, Bareilly had a population of 903,668, of which 476,927 were males and 426,741 were females. The sex ratio was 895. Population within the age group of 0 to 6 years was 107,323. The total number of literates in Bareilly was 543,515, which constituted 60.1% of the population, of which male literacy is 66.5% and female literacy is 55.7%. The effective literacy rate of 7+ population of Bareilly was 68.3%, of which male literacy rate was 72.7% and female literacy rate was 63.2%. The Scheduled Castes and Scheduled Tribes had a population of 71,215 and 2,771 respectively. In 2011, Bareilly had a total of 166222 households.

=== Religion ===
Religions in Bareilly (2011)
Religion	Followers
Hinduism	58.58%
Islam	38.80%
Sikhism	0.90%
Christianity	0.78%
Other or not stated	0.93%

Bareilly has a majority of Hindus, with 58.58% following Hinduism according to the 2011 Indian Census. Islam is the second most followed religion in the city, with about 38.80% followers. Sikhism (0.90% followers), Christianity (0.78% followers), Jainism (0.05% followers) and Buddhism (0.05% followers) are also practised in the city. Apart from that, about 0.03% people follow some other religions, while about 0.81% of the people did not state their religion.

The city lends its name to the Barelvi movement, which originated in British India to counter the influence of the Deobandi movement and Wahhabism. It follows the Sunni Hanafi school of jurisprudence, and has hundreds of millions of followers in South Asia. Seven ancient Hindu temples dedicated to Shiva are located in the city – Dhopeshwar Nath, Madhi Nath, Alakha Nath, Tapeshwar Nath, Bankhandi Nath, Pashupati Nath and Trivati Nath, due to which the city is also known by the name of Nath Nagri. There is a Roman Catholic Diocese of Bareilly.

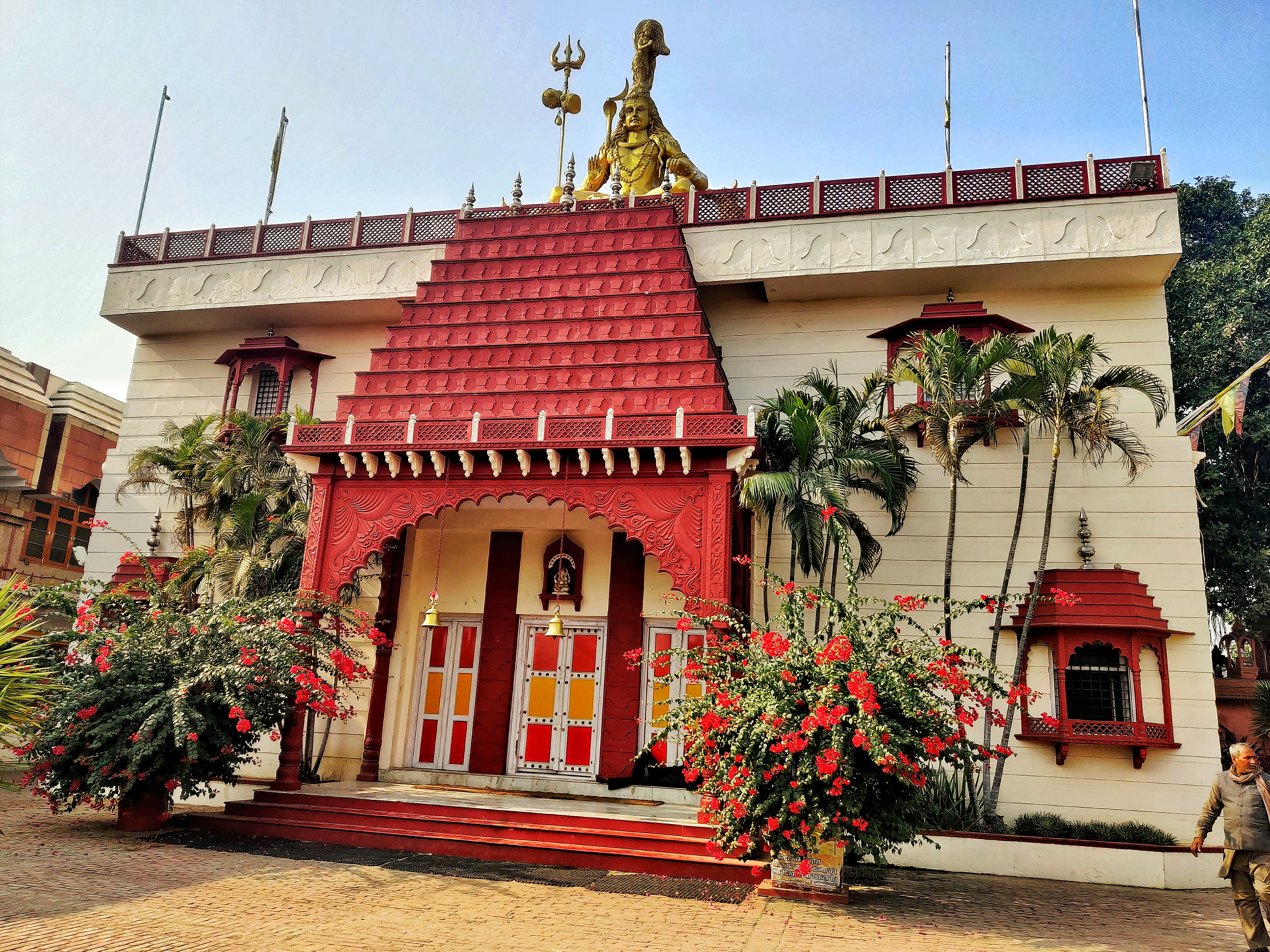
Dedicated to Lord Shiva, the Trivatinath Temple is one of the seven Nath Temples in the city.

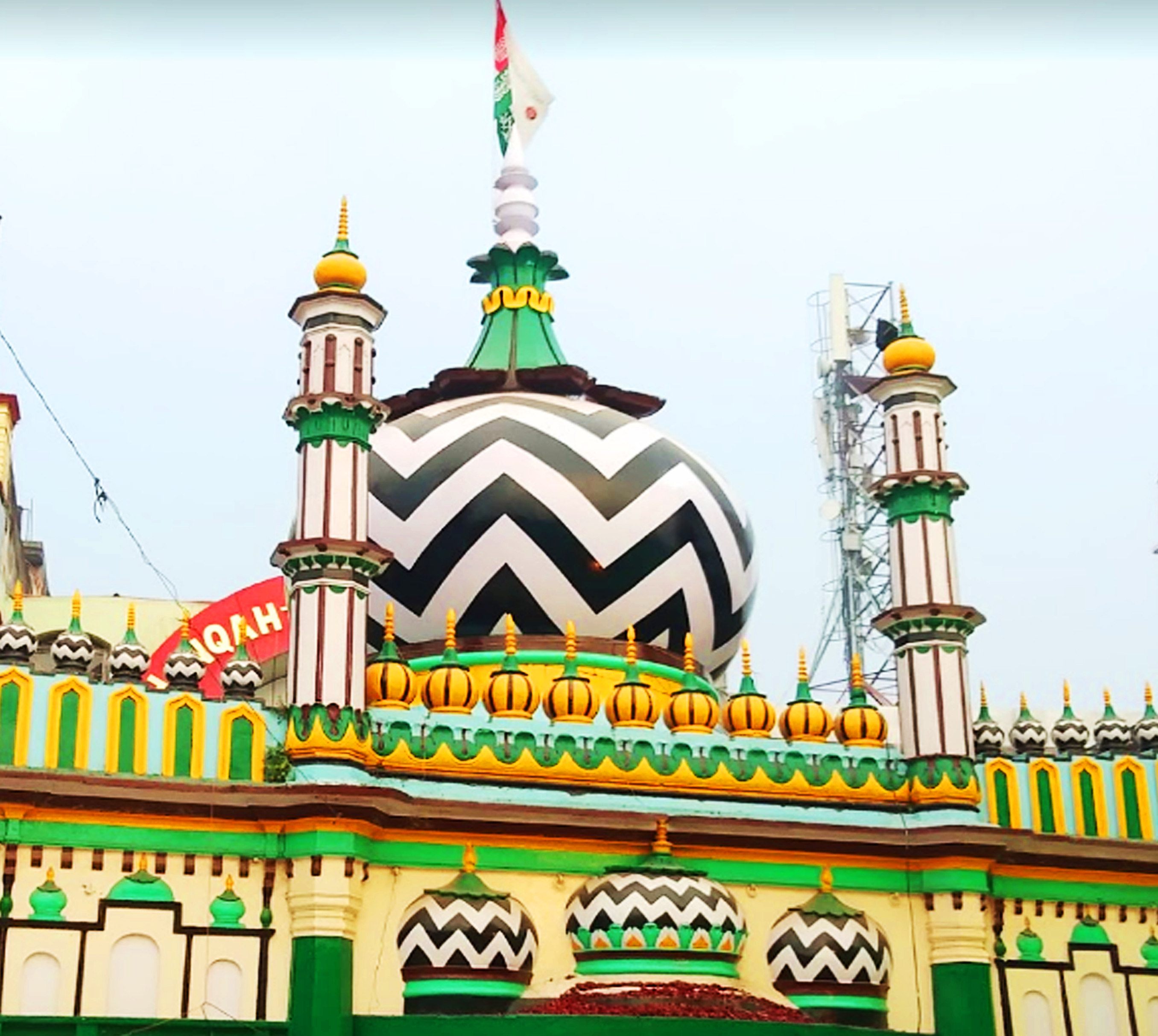
Bareilly Dargah, the tomb of Ahmad Raza Khan.

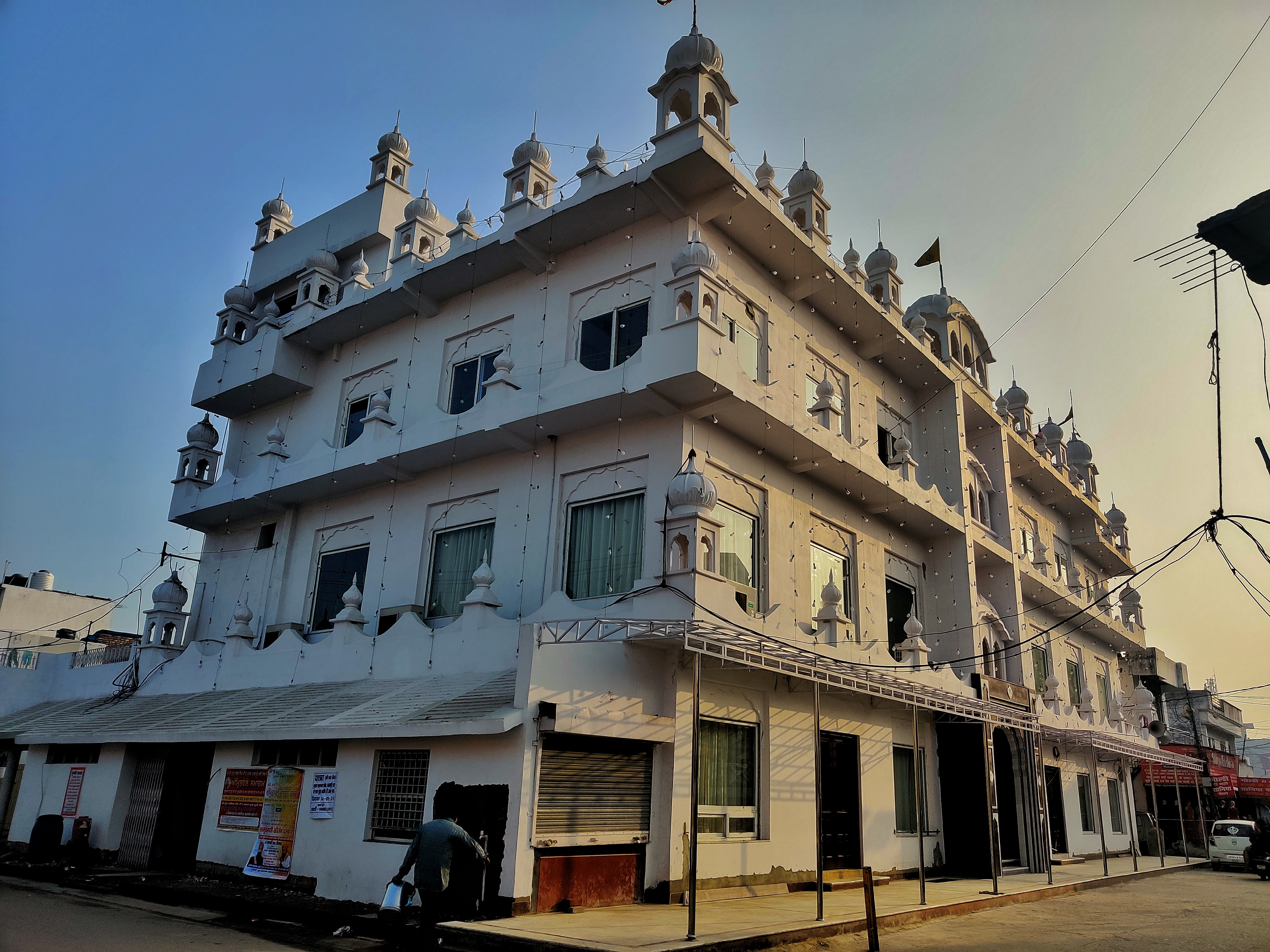
A Sikh Gurudwara in Model Town Bareilly.

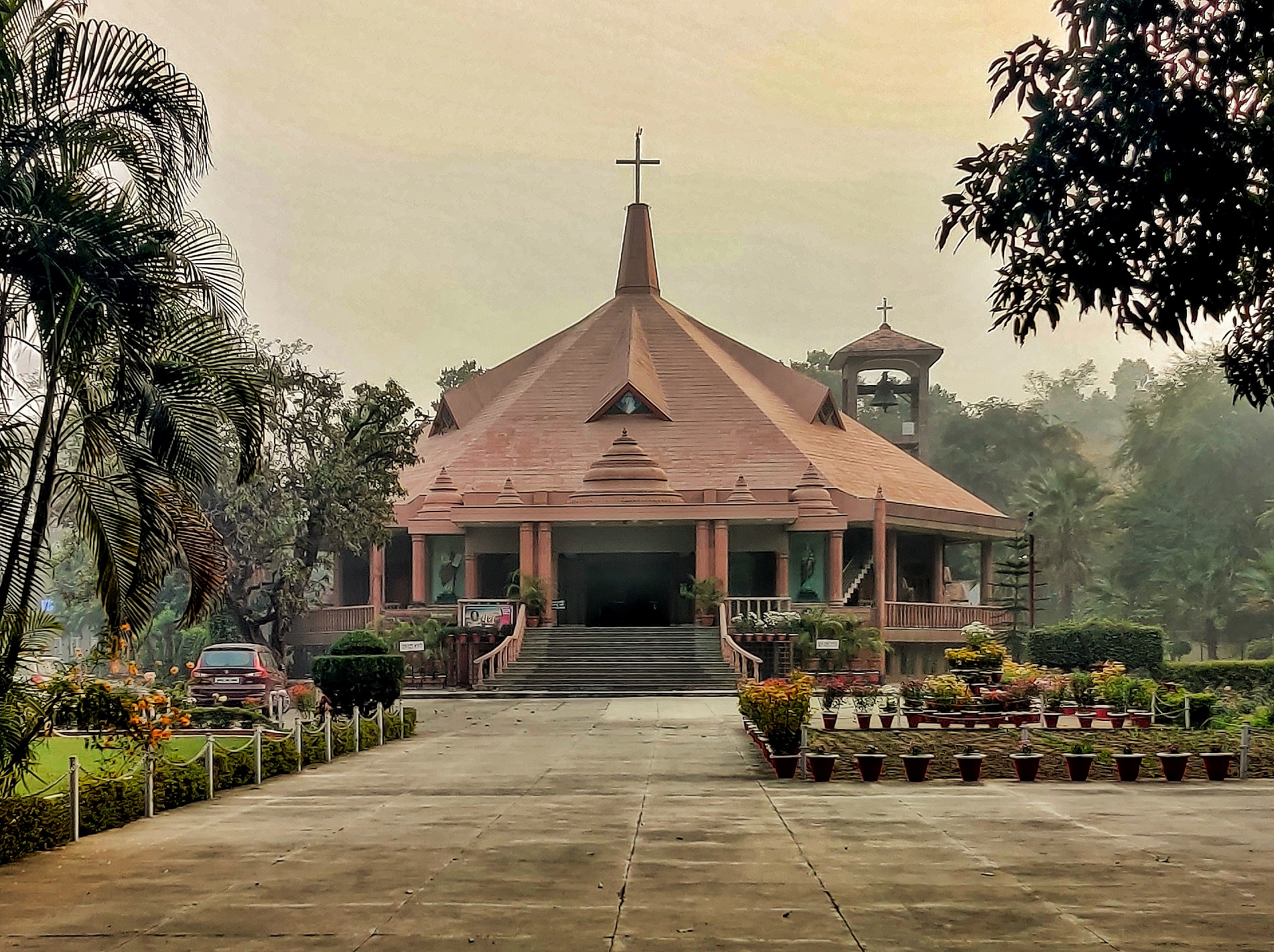
Cathedral of St. Alphonsus, the seat of the Roman Catholic Diocese of Bareilly.

=== Languages ===
Languages in Bareilly (2011)
1. Hindi (89.3%)
2. Urdu (9.90%)
3. Others (0.79%)

The official languages are Hindi and Urdu.

== Administration and politics ==
=== General Administration ===
Bareilly division consists of four districts, and is headed by the divisional commissioner of Bareilly, who is an IAS officer. The commissioner is the head of local government institutions (including municipal corporations) in the division, is in charge of infrastructure development in his division, and is also responsible for maintaining law and order in the division. The district magistrate of Bareilly reports to the divisional commissioner.

Bareilly district administration is headed by the district magistrate and collector (DM) of Bareilly, who is an IAS officer. The DM is in charge of property records and revenue collection for the central government and oversees the elections held in the city. The DM is also responsible for maintaining law and order in the city. The DM is assisted by a chief development officer; two additional district magistrates; one city magistrate; and four additional city magistrates.

=== Civic administration ===
The municipal board of Bareilly was established on 24 June 1858 under the North-West Provinces and Oudh Act XXVI of 1850. It was then a municipal committee, which was constituted by nominated members headed by the District Magistrate, who was its Ex-Officio Chairman. Seven of the nine nominated members were British including the Magistrate. Later, the North-West Provinces and Oudh Municipal Improvements Act of 1868 (Act VI of '68) recommended the elective principle, which was duly implemented. However, the District Magistrate still remained the chairman of this committee. The Members continued to be nominated by the government until the year 1868, when the elective principle was partially adopted - 27 members now came through election process, while 9 members were still nominated by the government. This system continued until 1900 when, under the Act of 1900, the number of nominated members was changed to 6 and the number of elected members became 18. Nominated members were reduced to 3 by the Municipality Act of 1916 while the number of elected members was increased to 19. Major changes were introduced in 1963; All members of the 48-member committee were now elected, and the system of nomination was abolished. The term of the board was usually 6 years.

As per the Ministry of Housing and Urban Affairs, the Bareilly Municipal Corporation reported a revenue of ₹268 crore (US$32 million) and an expenditure of ₹263 crore (US$32 million) in 2022–23. Taxes contributed to 19.4% of the revenue, while the remaining income came from non-tax sources such as grants and other municipal revenues.

=== Politics ===
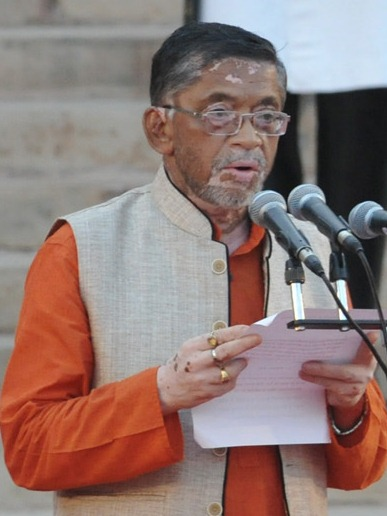
Santosh Gangwar has represented Bareilly in the Lok Sabha eight times.

The 16th Lok Sabha Election for the Bareilly MP was won by Santosh Gangwar of the Bharatiya Janata Party. He defeated Praveen Singh Aron by huge margin to retain his stronghold. Bareilly has been a traditional battleground between the INC and the saffron parties. Regional parties such as the Samajwadi Party, led by Veerpal Singh Yadav, and the Bahujan Samaj Party have a limited influence.

Santosh Gangwar was a Member of Parliament for Bareilly for 20 years (1989–2009). He was a former Minister of State for Petroleum and Natural Gas, with an additional charge of Parliament Affairs in the 13th Lok Sabha. Before this, Gangwar was Minister of State of Science and Technology with an additional charge of Parliamentary Affairs from October to November 1999 and chief whip of the BJP in the 14th Lok Sabha. He was narrowly defeated in the 15th Lok Sabha elections in 2009. He was elected again as a Member of Parliament in 2014 and was selected on 27 May 2014 onwards as the Union Minister of State (Independent Charge) Ministry of Textile; Ministry of Parliamentary Affairs; and Ministry of Water Resources, River Development and Ganga Rejuvenation[8][9]

In May 2019, Gangwar became the Minister of State (Independent Charge) for Labour and Employment. Santosh Gangwar resigned from his post on 7 July 2021, ahead of the reshuffle in the Modi cabinet. He is currently the Chaiperson of the Committee on Public Undertakings.

=== Law and order ===
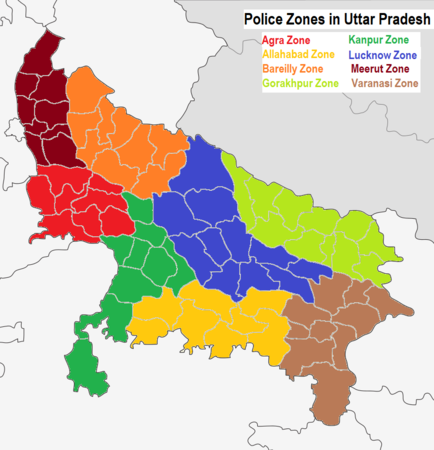
The Bareilly Zone (shown in orange), one of the 8 Zones of the UP Police, is headquartered in the city.

Bareilly city comes under the Bareilly zone and Bareilly range of the Uttar Pradesh Police; both of which are headquartered in the city. The Bareilly zone is headed by an Indian Police Service (IPS) officer of Additional Director General (ADG) rank, while the Bareilly range is headed by an Inspector General (IG) rank IPS officer. The ADG, Bareilly Zone is Avinash Chandra, and IG, Bareilly Range is Ramit Sharma.

Police force in the Bareilly district is headed by a Senior Superintendent (SSP) rank police officer, who is practically responsible for maintaining law and order in the district. The SSP is assisted in this task by four Additional Superintendent (ASP) rank officers - SP City looks after the functioning of police stations and law and order in the urban areas, while SP Rural looks after the functioning of the police stations apart from taking care of law and order in the rural areas of the district. SP traffic takes care of traffic arrangements throughout the district and SP Crime oversees criminal investigations that require in-depth analysis. Under these several officers, Circle Officers (CO) of the rank of Deputy Superintendent (DSP) take care of the responsibilities of the police stations allotted to them. Five Circle officers come under the supervision of SP Rural while Four officers come under SP City and one CO traffic comes under SP traffic. Apart from this, one CO lines is also posted in Bareilly.

There are a total of 29 police stations in Bareilly district. One SHO is stationed at the Bareilly Kotwali while other police stations in the district are headed by an SO. There are various outposts (Chowkis) under the police stations where officials of the rank of head constable and constable are stationed along with the beat officers, who are usually on rounds in the areas under them. In addition to the regular police force, reserve forces are also deployed with reserve equipments in the reserve police lines located near Choupla Bareilly. They report directly to the SSP. CO LIU takes care of the Local intelligence by giving regular inputs to the police and magistracy. Two police control rooms are situated in Bareilly - the District Control Room looks after the rural areas of Bareilly while the City Control Room takes care of the urban areas. Additionally they help in coordinating and carrying out of communication throughout the district. There is also a women's police station under CO-1st in Bareilly for action on crimes and issues related to women.

Bareilly has a District Court under the High Court of Judicature of Allahabad. The court is headed by the district judge of Bareilly, who is assisted by numerous additional district judges, civil judges (senior division) and additional civil judges. Sm. Renu Agarwal is presently posted as the District & Sessions Judge at Bareilly.

== Economy ==
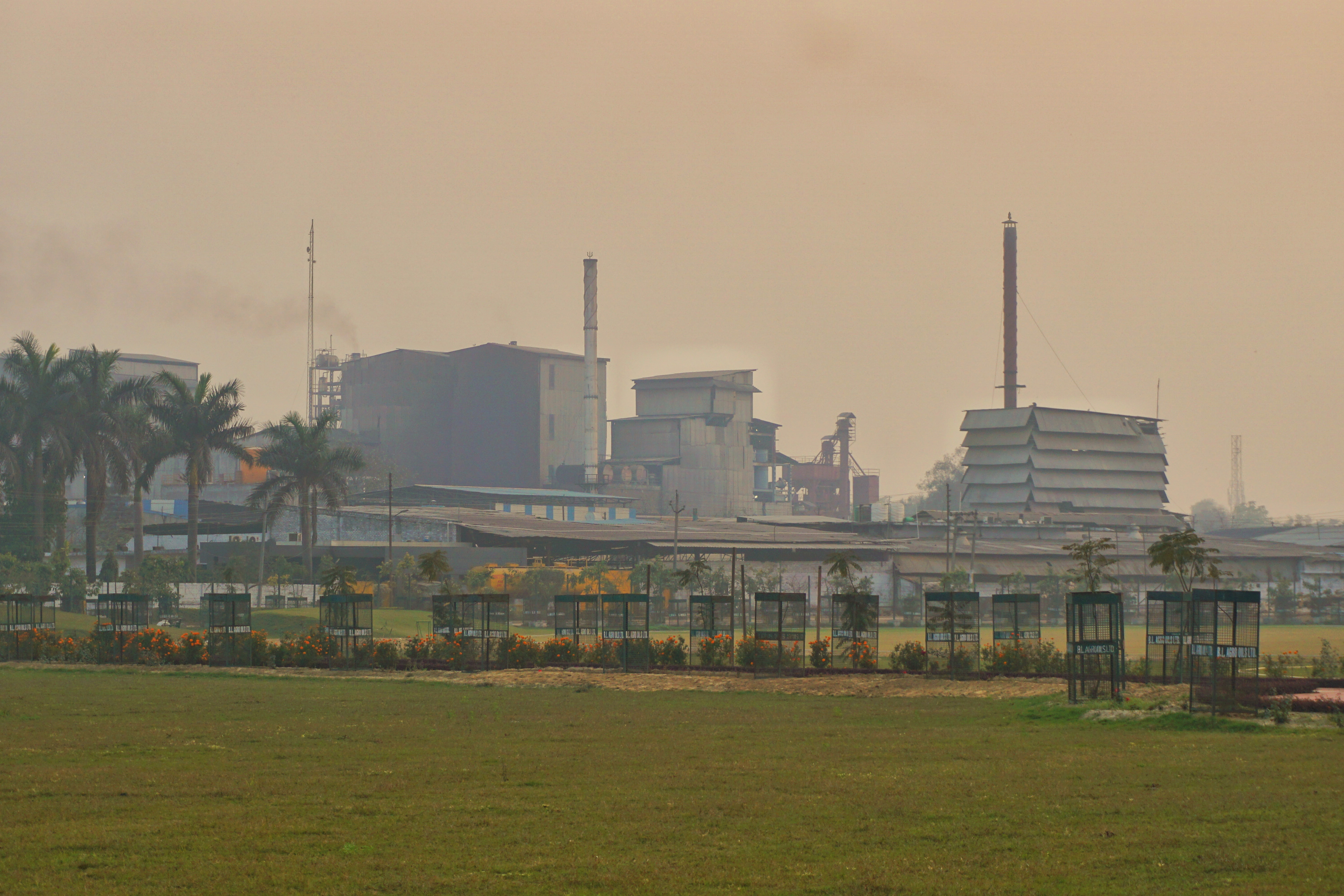
B.L. Agro Refinery at Parsakhera. The Parsakhera Industrial Estate was established by UPSIDC in 1980.

Since India began liberalising its economy, Bareilly has experienced rapid growth. Commerce has diversified with mall culture, although the area's rural economy remains agrarian, handicraft (zari-zardosi embroidery work on cloth material), bamboo and cane furniture. The city is equidistant from New Delhi (national capital) and Lucknow, the capital of Uttar Pradesh. This makes Bareilly a nodal point between two major cities of India.

Bareilly was a flourishing cotton centre in early nineteenth century. There were about 20,000 looms in the city in 1802, with a production value of Rs 30,00,000 per year. Robert Glyn, the then Magistrate of Bareilly asked Ghulam Yahya to write an account of "craftsmen, the names of tools of manufacture and production and their dress and manners". The most popular trades in and around Bareilly during the 1820s were manufacturing glass, jewellery, glass and lac bangles and gold and silver thread, crimping, bean drying, wire drawing, charpoy weaving, keeping a grocer's shop and selling kebabs.

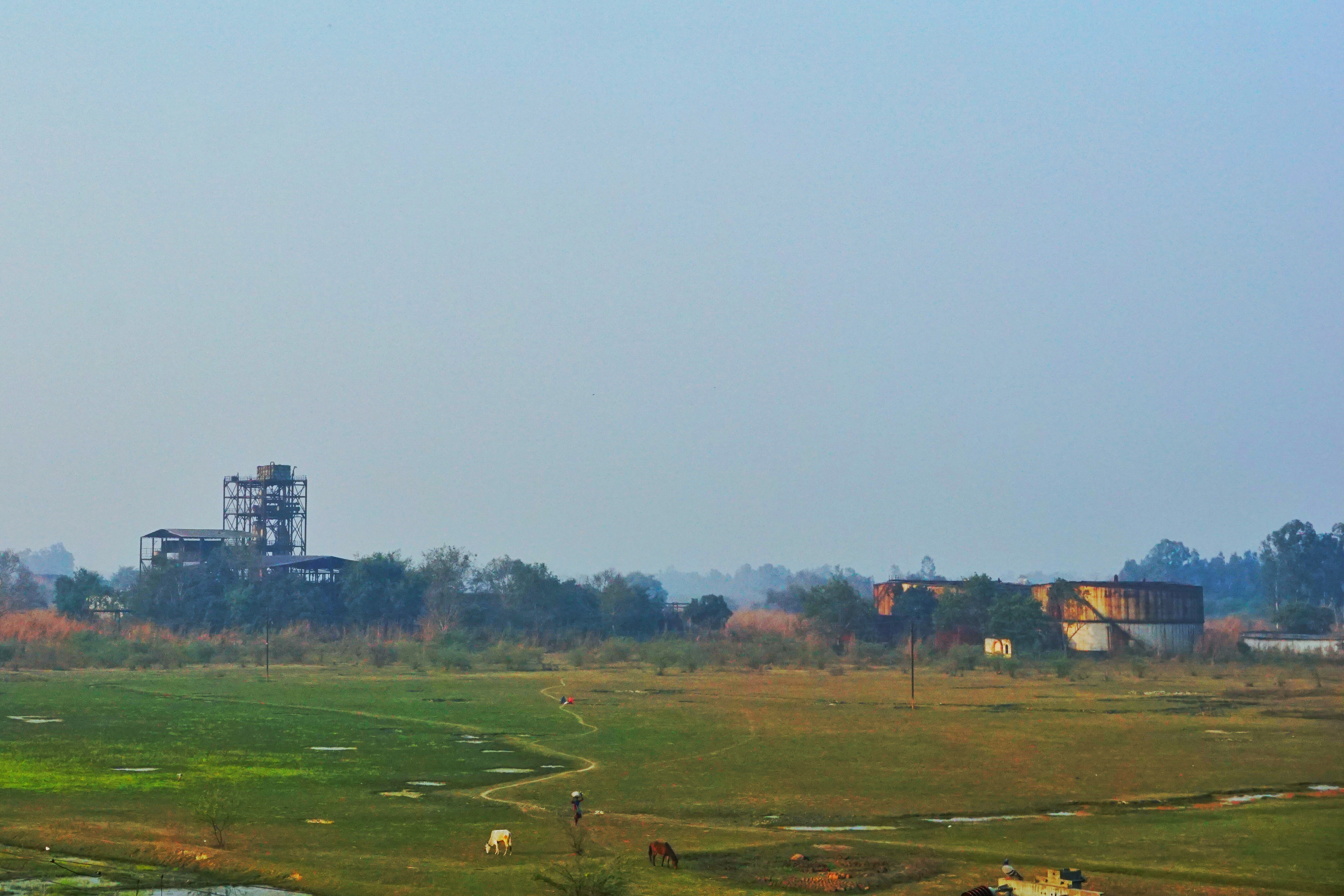
Abandoned Rubber Factory at Fatehganj. The factory closed down on 15 July 1999.

The city witnessed rapid growth in trade and commerce, transport and other socio-economic activities after the construction of Railway lines in the early twentieth century. Several factories, including the National Brewery Company, a match factory, an ice factory and a steam-powered flour mill were established in the city in first decade of the century. The Indian Wood Products Limited was established in Izzatnagar in 1919, where Catechu was produced on a large scale. A number of industries such as the Indian Turpentine & Rosin (founded in 1926) and the Western Indian Match Company (WIMCO; founded in 1937) were also established at C.B. Ganj, located at a distance of 8 km from the city center. HR Sugar Factory was established in Nekpur in 1932. As a result, Bareilly emerged as a major industrial and commercial area of the region by the 1940s, with many banks and educational institutions being established in every corner of the city.

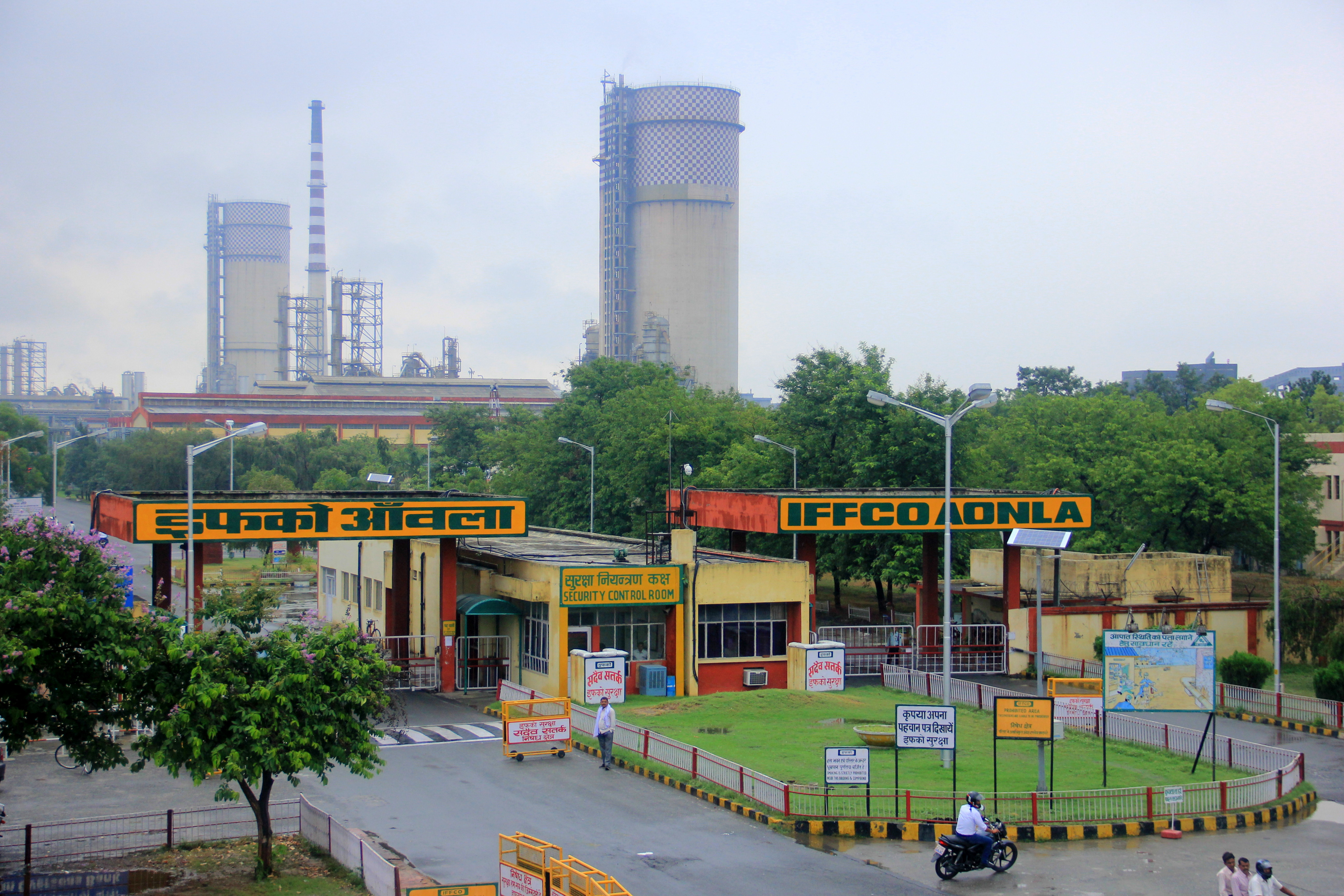
IFFCO plant at Aonla

The industrial development of the city continued after the independence of India in 1947 and small scale industries related to khandsari, furniture, engineering and oil extraction began to take shape in Shahamatganj and Nai Basti. Industrial estates were established by the UP State Industrial Development Corporation (UPSIDC) in CB Ganj in 1958, Bhojipura in 1979 and in Parsakhera in 1980. CB Ganj and Ijjat Nagar had by this time established themselves as major industrial and industrial-cum-transport centers of the city respectively, while the Shahamatganj and Qila markets were among the largest in Bareilly and surrounding areas. By the 1960s and 1980s, several markets were built around residential areas located on the Qutubkhana-railway junction road, of which Subhash Market, Chaupula, Punjabi and Kishore Markets were among the prominent ones. According to the 1971 census of India, Bareilly was a City board of Ist category, and was ranked 9th in the state by importance. The economy here relied on the industrial-cum-service sector; A large number of workers were engaged in activities that were closely related either to industry or to tertiary sectors.

By the end of the 1990s many industries in the city were shut down. The Indian Turpentine & Rosin Factory (ITR) was shut down in April 1998 and the sugar mill of Nekpur ceased production in September 1998. The mill, which was under the control of the UP Sugar Corporation had been awarded a gold medal for producing sugar more than the set target in the year 1997 itself. A rubber factory situated in Fatehganj West was also closed on 15 July 1999. The products of the factory were famous all over Asia, and about two thousand people were serving in this factory. The WIMCO factory in CB Ganj, which used to supply matches across the country, was shut down in 2015. Indian Farmers Fertiliser Cooperative (IFFCO) has a large plant at Aonla (30 km). The plant was commissioned in 1988 and expanded in 1996. It produces ammonia and urea.

Bareilly has very productive land (Tarai) for growing Sugarcane, Rice, pulses & wheat. Hindustan Unilever has begun growing rice in Bareilly and the Punjab, but the company desires legal reforms and facility construction. In 2009, Uttar Pradesh Power Corporation Limited (UPPCL) awarded pilot contracts to supply power to nine cities to companies who will collect revenue for the state government. Bareilly, Agra, Kanpur, Moradabad and Gorakhpur will be part of the first phase. The Indian government initiated a 10-percent-ethanol-blending programme on a pilot basis in Bareilly and Belgaum in Karnataka. The city also has CNG and liquid petroleum gas (LPG) outlets. Bareilly district was the first to implement India's bio-fuel standard.

== Culture ==
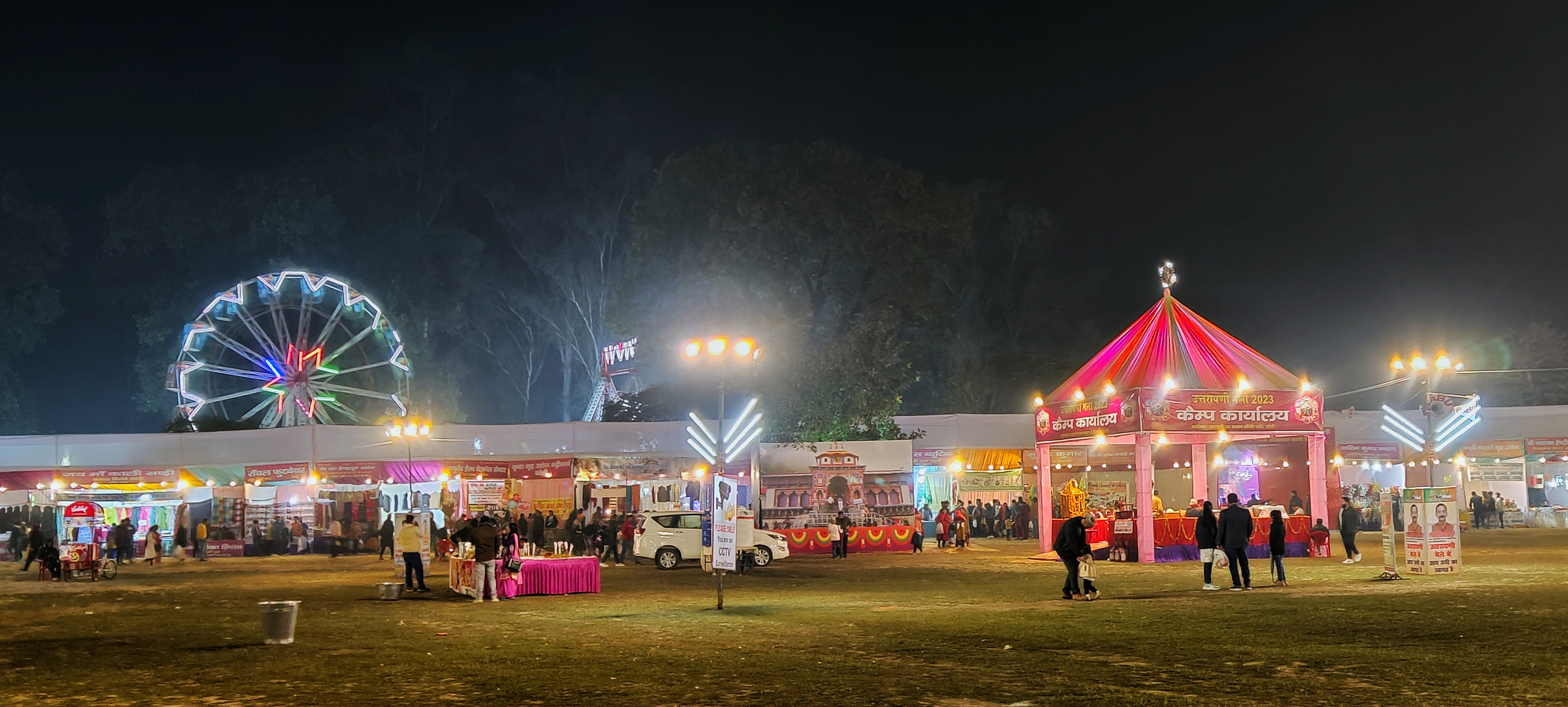
The Uttarayani fair is held annually on the occasion of Makar Sankranti.

Among the major fairs held in Bareilly are the Chaubari fair, Nariyawal fair, Uttarayani fair and Dussehra fair. The Chaubari fair is held annually on the banks of Ramganga near Chaubari village. The fair takes place on the occasion of Kartik Purnima. The biggest attraction of this fair is the market of Nakhar Horses, in which people from far off areas come to sell and buy horses. The Nariyawal fair, which lasts for about 15 days, is the second largest fair of the city. The fair takes place on the occasion of Gupt Navratri in the temple complex of Goddess Sheetla located at Nariyawal. The fair is mainly a religious affair which is attended by devotees from far-flung districts in addition to the nearby villagers. The three-day Uttarayani fair is also organised every year at the Bareilly Club ground in Civil Lines by the 'Uttarayani Janakalyan Samiti'. The fair is held from 13 to 15 January on the occasion of Makar Sankranti. Several cultural events are held in Kumaoni and Garhwali languages, in which many artists from the nearby hill region come to perform.

== Transport ==
=== Roads ===
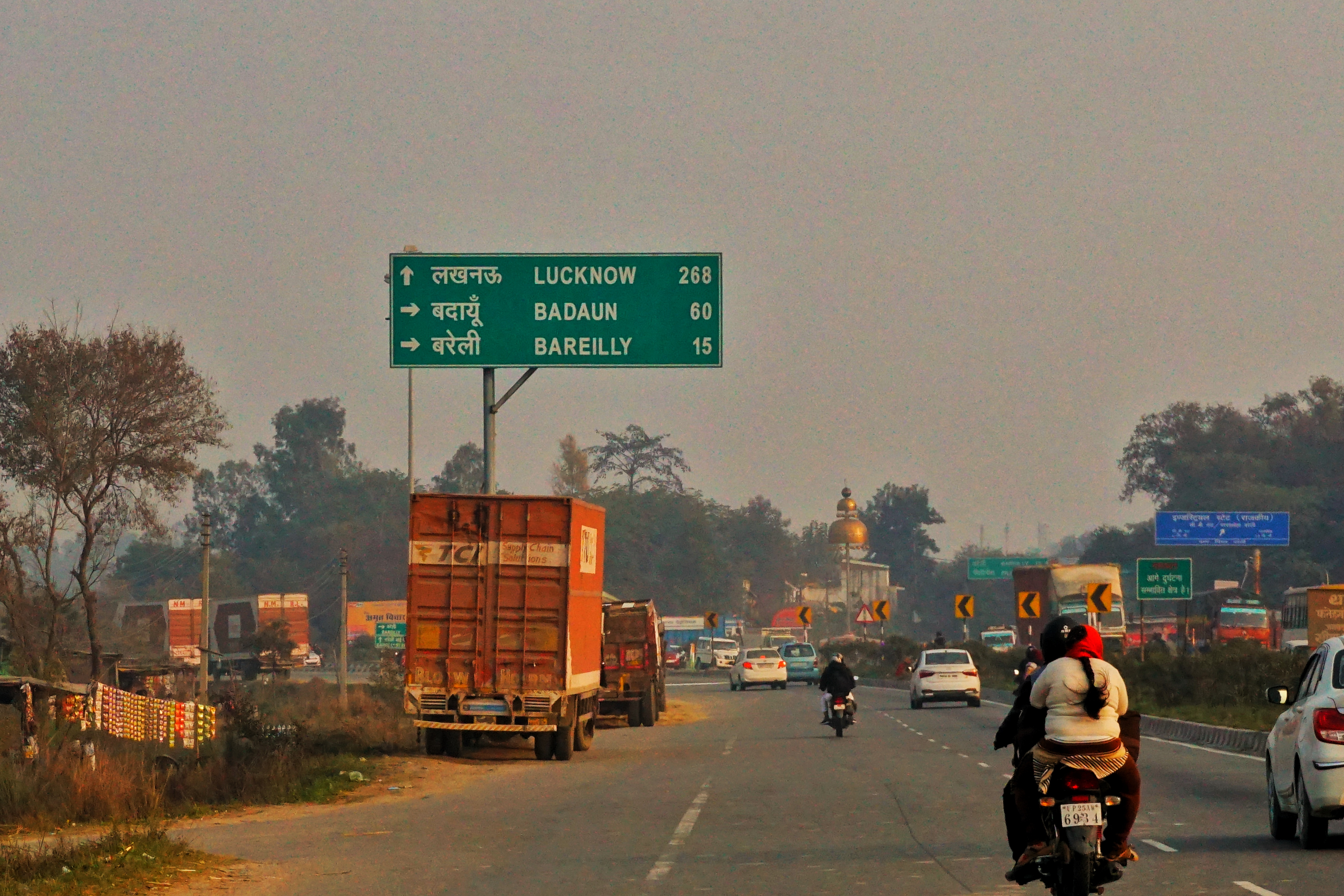
NH 530 connects Bareilly with Rampur.

Bareilly lies on the National Highway 30, which connects Sitarganj in Uttarakhand with Vijaywada in Andhra Pradesh. The 2040 km (1267.5 mi) highway starts at the junction of NH 9 at Sitarganj, and passes through Bareilly, Lucknow, Allahabad, Jabalpur and Raipur to end at the junction of NH 65 in Ibrahimpatnamm suburb of Vijaywada. Other National Highways originating in the city include NH 530 (Bareilly–Rampur Highway), NH 530B (Bareilly–Mathura Highway) and NH 730B (Bareilly–Bisalpur Highway). The UP State Highway 37 (Bareilly–Nainital Road) also originates in Bareilly; so does the MDR29 W road, which connects Bareilly to Bilaspur via Shahi and Shishgarh.

Arterial streets include:

- Stadium Road (connecting Pilibhit Road (D.D. Puram) to the ShyamGanj crossroad)
- Macnair Road (connecting Nainital Road to Stadium Road)
- Pilibhit By-pass Road, connecting Pilibhit Road to Lucknow Road (Old National Highway 24 or Delhi-Lucknow Highway)
- SH-33 Bareilly to Mathura via Subhash Nagar & ( Vishwanathpuram ), Budaun and Kasganj
- Mini By-Pass, connecting Delhi Road (Old National Highway 24 or Delhi-Lucknow Highway) to Nainital Road
- Shyam Ganj– Patel Chowk Choraha–Chaupla–Quila–C.B. Ganj Road (Old National Highway 24 or Delhi-Lucknow Highway)
- Shyam Ganj–Bareilly Cantt–Chowki Chauraha–Chaupla Road
- I.V.R.I. Road (connecting Nainital Road to Pilibhit Road)
- Civil Lines Road
- Highway connecting Delhi to Lucknow four lane via Bareilly is a 29-kilometre-long (18 mi) highway which bypasses the city crowd of Bareilly, ensuring the smooth running of local traffic.

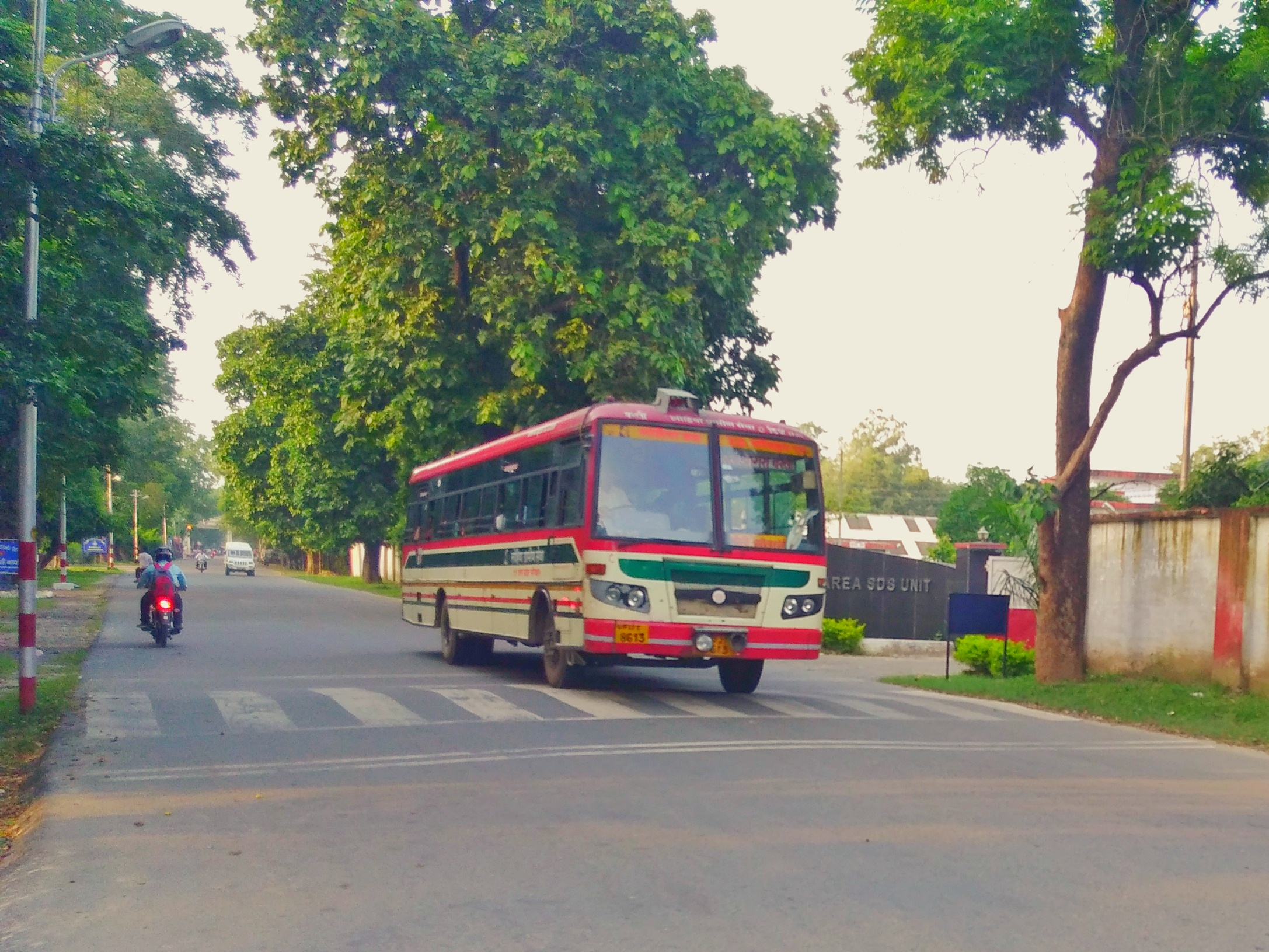
A UPSRTC Bus in Bareilly Cantt.

Bareilly is the headquarters of Bareilly region of UPSRTC, which has four depots and twelve stations under it. The city has two Bus stations, from where inter-city buses operate. The Bareilly bus station (old bus stand) located in Civil Lines caters to Buses plying on routes towards the north, west and south of city i.e. on Moradabad-Delhi, Haldwani-Nainital, Haridwar-Dehradun and Agra-Jaipur routes; while the Bareilly Satellite bus station caters to bus services eastwards of the city notably to Kanpur, Lucknow, Prayagraj and Tanakpur. Another bus station is proposed at Izzatnagar. The bus station would be built over an area of 2.285 hectares and would cater to bus services towards Delhi and Uttarakhand.

=== City buses ===
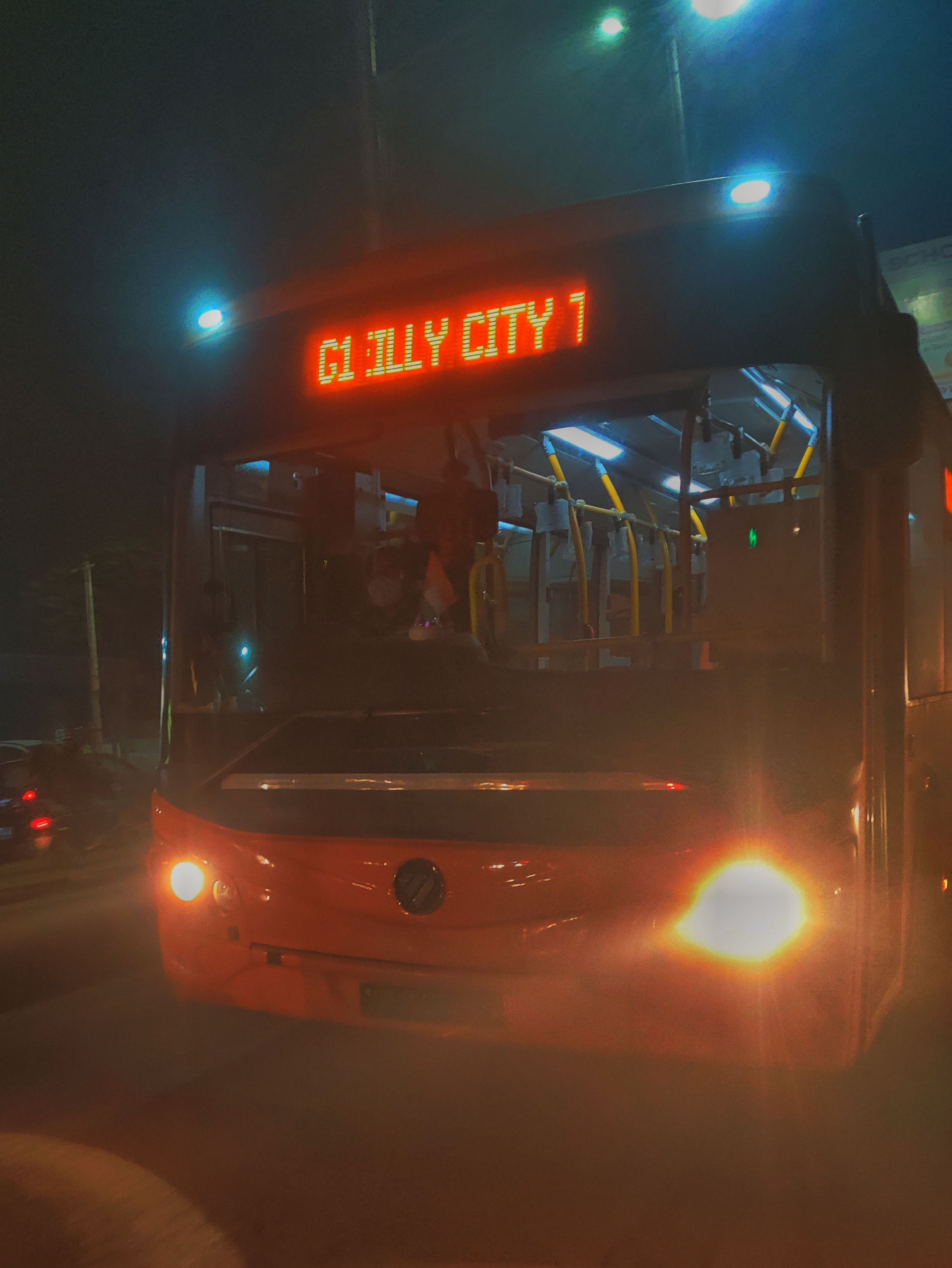
A Bareilly city bus

City buses in Bareilly are operated by the Bareilly City Transport Services Limited (BCTSL). Electric buses run on three routes in the city. A charging station-cum-depot for these buses is located in the Swale Nagar neighbourhood of the city.

City bus services in Bareilly were started initially on the Kutubkhana-Railway Junction route by the Uttar Pradesh State Road Transport Corporation. In the 1960s, a total of 4 buses used to ply on the urban routes, and in 1964, 6 new buses were introduced, increasing the number of buses to 10. By 1963–64 the bus services had been expanded from Koharapeer to Bhojipura and Fatehganj. By the late 1970s, six private buses were operating in the city under the control of the UPSRTC, with an average of 5000 daily commuters. However, gradual increase in the traffic on the city roads and the arrival of smaller vehicles resulted in the roadways bus services going into losses, and therefore the bus services were discontinued in the year 1990. At the time of their discontinuation, City buses used to operate from Kutubkhana to Railway Junction, Sadar Cantt, Sainthal, Nawabganj, Faridpur and Fatehganj.

A proposal to restart city bus services in the city was initiated by Bareilly Municipal Corporation in 2019 under the Smart Cities Mission; 25 CNG and Electric buses were proposed to ply on five routes with a depot at Ramganga Nagar. Approval to operate AC Electric buses in the city was granted by state Cabinet in December 2019. Construction of a charging station for the electric buses commenced in Swale Nagar in 2020, and was completed in September 2021. The Electric Buses were inaugurated on 4 January 2022.

=== Rail ===
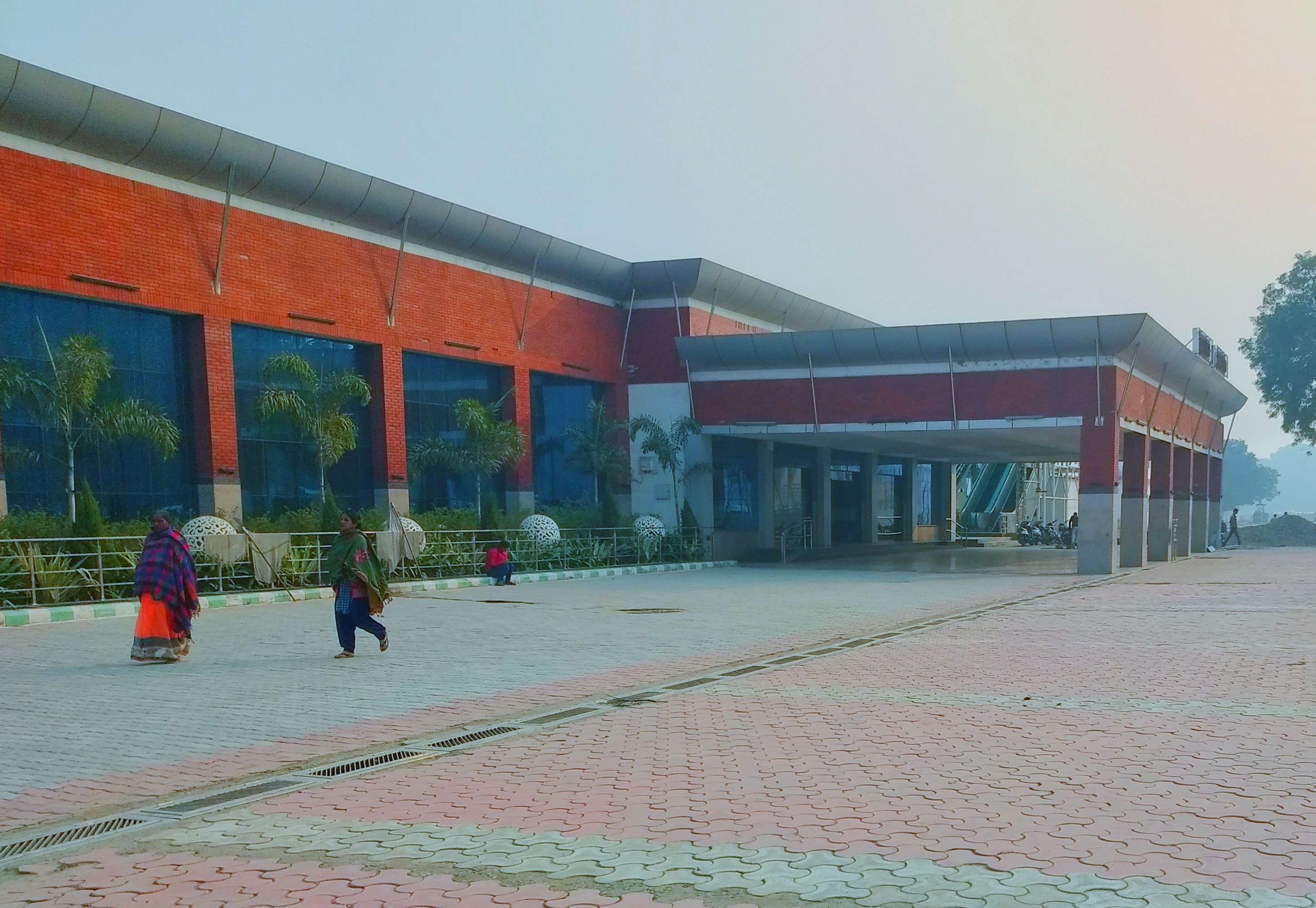
Izzatnagar is the divisional headquarters of one of the three divisions of North Eastern Railways.

After the British Indian Government purchased the Indian Branch Railway on 31 March 1872, and renamed the Lucknow–Kanpur main line as the Oudh and Rohilkhand Railway, railway services started to expand towards the west of Lucknow. The construction of a railway line from Lucknow to Sandila and then further onwards to Hardoi was completed in 1872. This line was further extended to Bareilly on 1 November 1873. Prior to that, another railway line connecting Moradabad to Chandausi had already been built in 1872; it too was extended to Bareilly, the construction completed on 22 December 1873.

A new railway line connecting Bareilly and Moradabad via Rampur, called the Bareilly–Moradabad Chord, was approved on 4 December 1891, and was completed by 8 June 1894. On 8 December 1894, the main line was officially diverted to this chord, while the older line was renamed the Chandausi loop. In 1890 the Bengal and North Western Railway leased the Tirhoot State Railway to increase the latter's revenue, and the Lucknow-Sitapur-Seramow Provincial State Railway merged with the Bareilly-Pilibheet Provincial State Railway to form the Lucknow-Bareilly Railway on 1 January 1891. The Lucknow-Bareilly Railway was owned by the Government of India, and operated by the Rohilkund and Kumaon Railway.

The Oudh and Tirhut Railway was formed on 1 January 1943 by the merger of the Bengal and North Western Railway, the Tirhut Railway (BNW operated), the Mashrak-Thawe Extension Railway (BNW operated), the Rohilkund and Kumaon Railway and the Lucknow-Bareilly Railway (R&K operated). The Oudh and Tirhut Railway was later renamed the Oudh Tirhut Railway; it merged with the Assam Railway and the Kanpur-Achnera section of the Bombay, Baroda and Central India Railway to form North Eastern Railway (headquartered in Gorakhpur, with a divisional headquarters in Izzatnagar), one of the 16 zones of the Indian Railways.

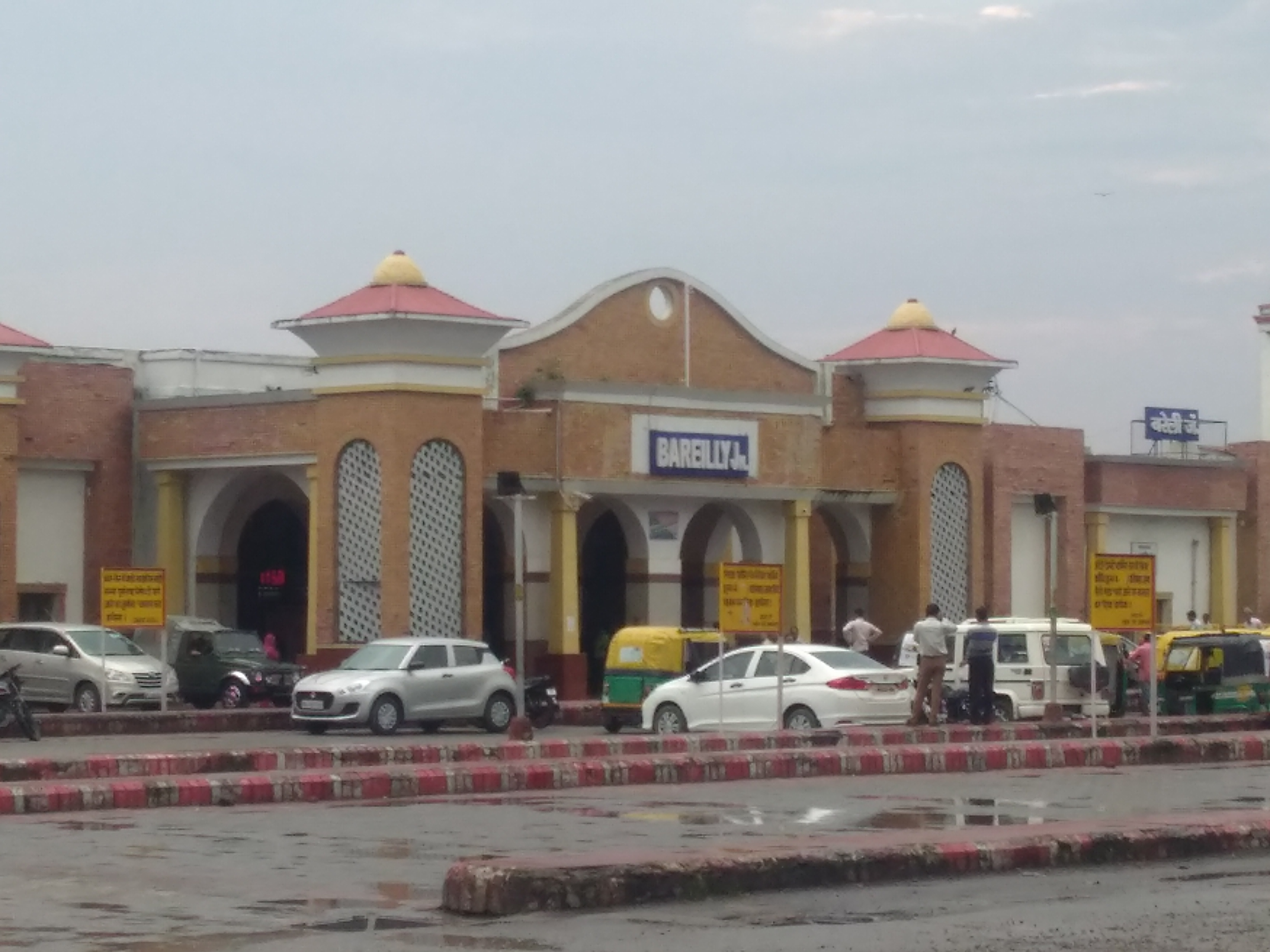
Bareilly Junction is among the Top 100 booking stations of Indian Railways

Several railway stations serve the city including:

- Bareilly Cantt (Station code: BRYC)
- Bareilly City (Station code: BC)
- Bareilly Junction (Station code: BE)
- Bhojipura Junction (Station code: BPR)
- C.B. Ganj (Station code: CBJ)
- Dohna (Station code: DOX)
- Izzatnagar (Station code: IZN)
- Parsa Khera (Station code: PKRA)
- Ramganga Bridge (Station code: RGB)

Bareilly is on the Moradabad-Lucknow route. Trains from the north (including Jammu Tawi and Amritsar) and Delhi running east and northeast (to Gorakhpur, Barauni, Howrah, Guwahati and Dibrugarh) pass through Bareilly, and the city is also on the route from Uttarakhand to Agra and Mathura via Budaun. Many trains to railway stations in Uttarakhand pass through Bareilly.

=== Metro ===
Bareilly Metro is a planned rapid metro system to decongest the traffic in the city. As of 26 April 2025, project DPR is under preparation.

=== Air ===
Bareilly city is served by the Bareilly Airport (IATA: BEK, ICAO: VIBY) – a civil enclave at the Indian Air Force's 'Trishul Air Base' in Izzatnagar, 6 kilometres (3.7 mi) north of the city centre.

The Airports Authority of India approved construction of a passenger terminal at the Bareilly civil enclave in 2016. 10 hectares (25 acres) of land was bought from local farmers by the district administration for the project. The AAI began the tender process to award construction contracts for the airport in September 2017 and expected the civil enclave to be ready by March 2018, pending Uttar Pradesh government approval. However, the IAF requested changes in the layout of the taxiway connecting the terminal to the runway. After the Ministry of Defence approved the taxiway, passenger service was hoped to begin by February 2019.

Bareilly Airport was inaugurated by state civil aviation minister Nand Gopal Nandi and Union minister Santosh Gangwar on 10 March 2019 at the civil enclave of Trishul Air Base. The terminal building can handle 75 passengers during the peak hour. Flight services from Bareilly to Delhi commenced on 8 March 2021. Currently, it serves 2 routes, Mumbai and Bengaluru.

== Education ==
The primary education in the government schools in Bareilly is taken care of by the Basic Shiksha Adhikari (BSA), who heads a team of Block Education Officers (BEO) to overlook the primary education sphere. The principal, teachers, Shiksha Mitras and the PTI teachers constitute the staff of the primary schools. There is also a School Management committee of which the village elected head is also a member. The District Inspector of Schools takes care of the secondary education in the government schools, and the government aided and government recognised institutions in Bareilly. The DIOS generally undertakes the Inspection of School/Colleges and duties of teachers and other employees of Schools and Colleges. He is also responsible for the disposal of Financial Matters and the Maintenance and Distribution of the grant received for the payment of the Salary for the Employees of Schools and Colleges. The District Institute of Education and Training, Bareilly is located in Faridpur.

Thomason's scheme of vernacular education was introduced experimentally in Bareilly in 1850.

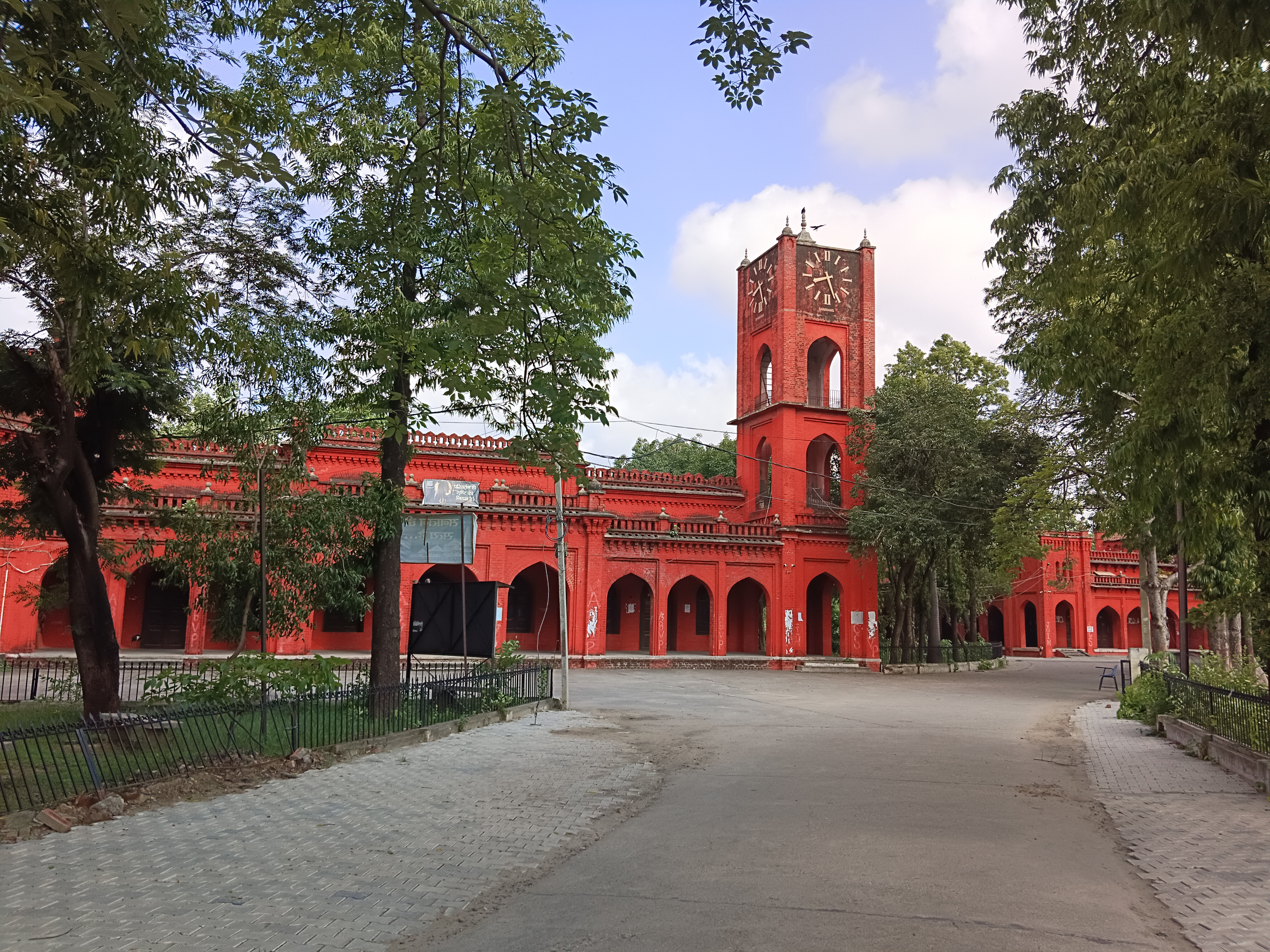
Bareilly College was established in 1837.

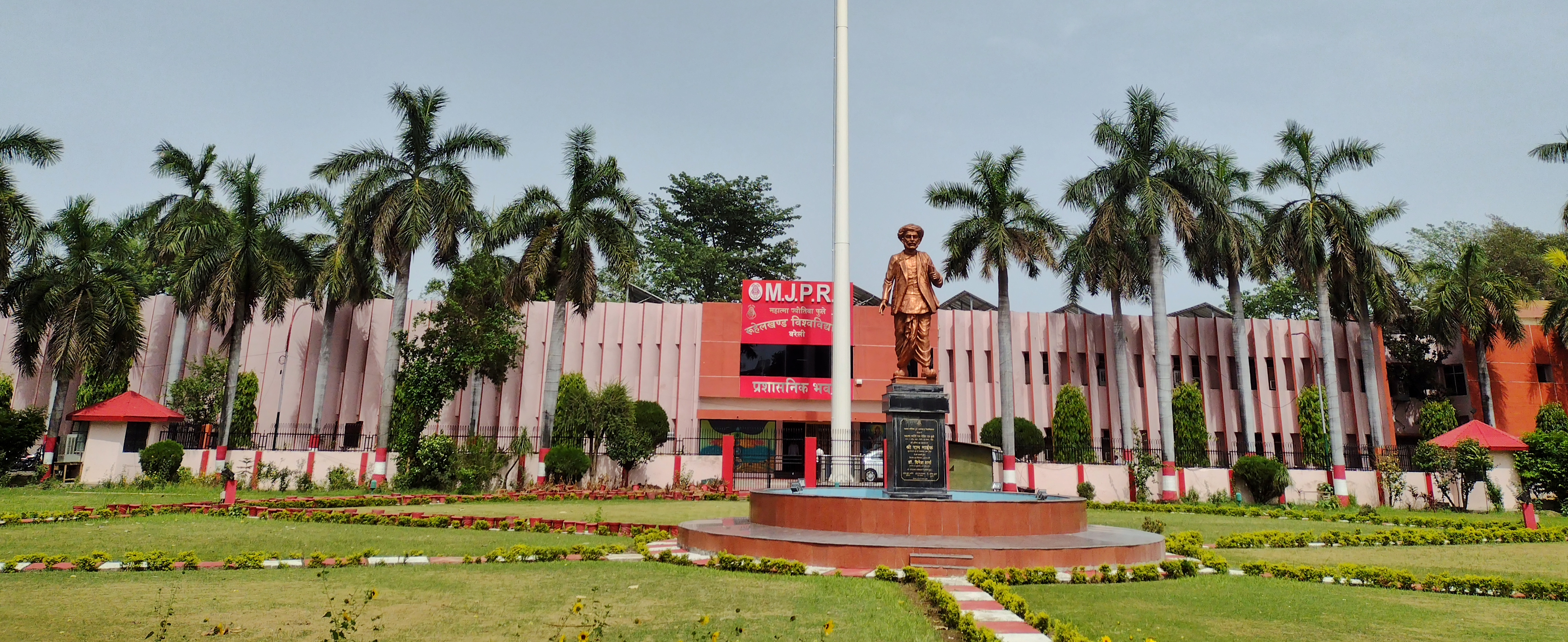
M. J. P. Rohilkhand University's jurisdiction extends over nine districts of Bareilly and Moradabad divisions.

There are several universities and institutes of higher education in Bareilly.

Universities

- Mahatma Jyotiba Phule Rohilkhand University
- Indian Veterinary Research Institute
- Central Avian Research Institute

Colleges

- Shri Ram Murti Smarak College of Engineering, Technology & Research
- Shri Ram Murti Smarak Institute of Medical Sciences
- Bareilly College
- Jamiatur Raza Islamic College
- Rohilkhand Medical College and Hospital
- Hartmann College

== Defence installations ==
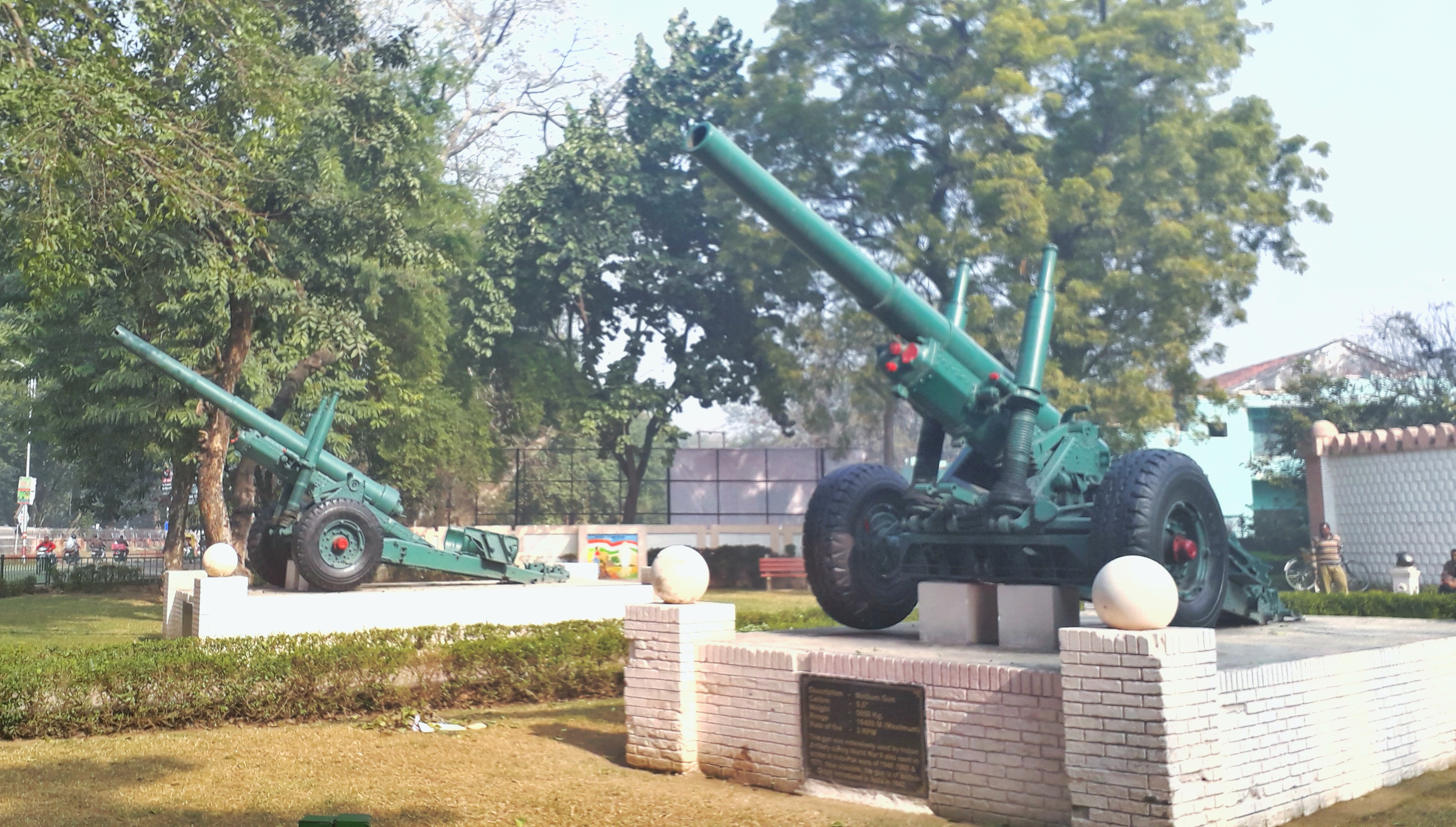
Cannons put for public display in a park at Kargil Chowk in Bareilly Cantt

In addition to the air-force base, Bareilly is the regimental centre and a major settlement of the Jat Regiment (one of the longest-serving and most-decorated infantry regiments of the Indian Army. The regiment won 19 battle honours from 1839 to 1947, and five battle honours, eight Mahavir Chakra, eight Kirti Chakra, 32 Shaurya Chakras, 39 Vir Chakras and 170 Sena Medals since independence.

== Places of interest ==
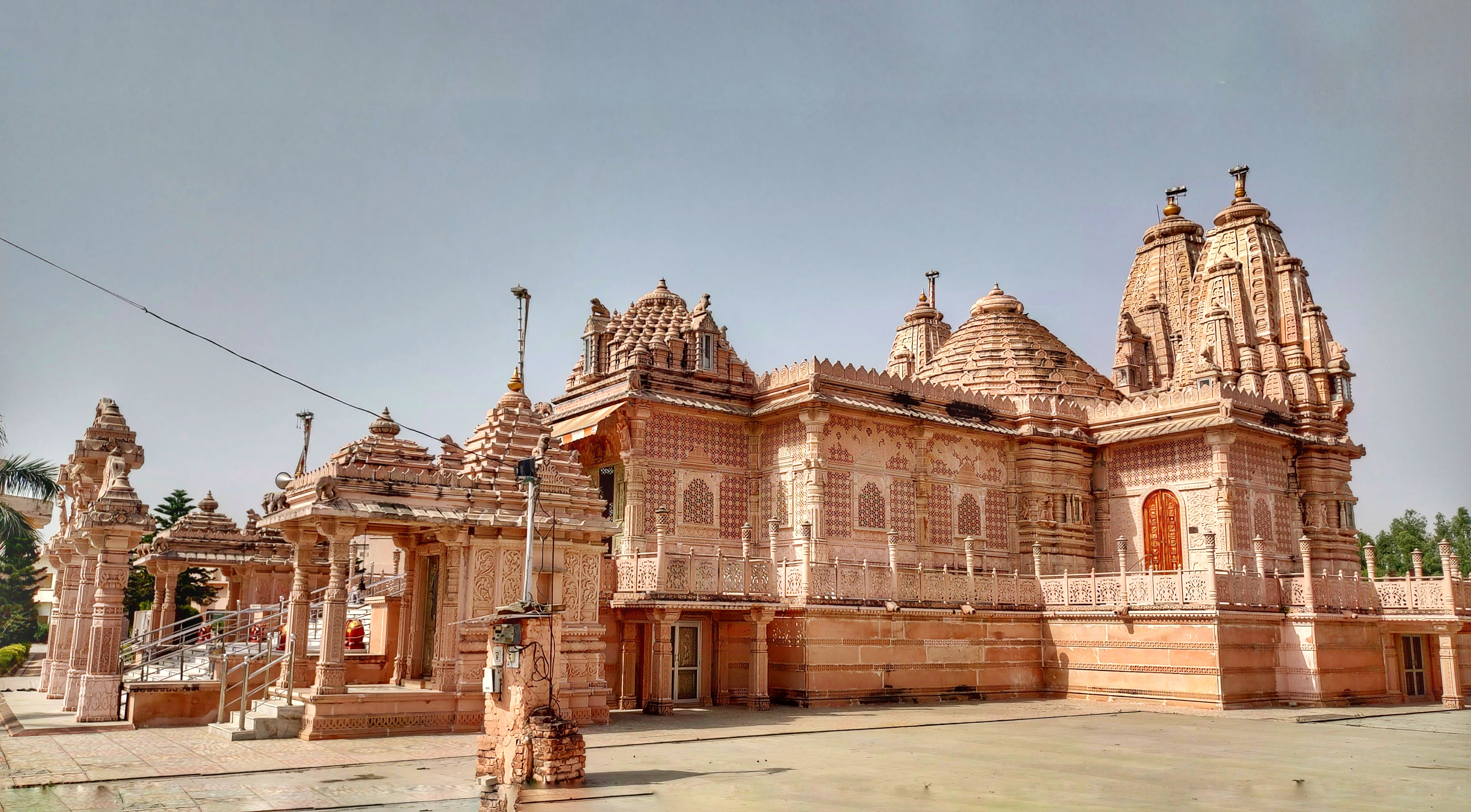
Jain Temples at Ahichchhatra

=== Islamic sites ===
- Dargah-e-Aala Hazrat

=== Churches ===
Name	Located	Year of Establishment	Architecture	Image	Ref
Christ Church, CNI	Bareilly Cantt	1838			
Christ Methodist Church	Civil Lines	1856	Protestant		
St Stephens Church	Bareilly Cantt	1861	Indo-Gothic		
St Alphonsus Church	Bareilly Cantt	1868	Roman		
St Michael and All Angels Church	Shahjahanpur Road	1862	Anglican		
Salvation Army Church	Civil Lines	1898			
Beerbhatti Methodist Church	Subhash Nagar	1983			
Life of Vision Ministry Church, Aonla Bareilly					

=== Sports ===
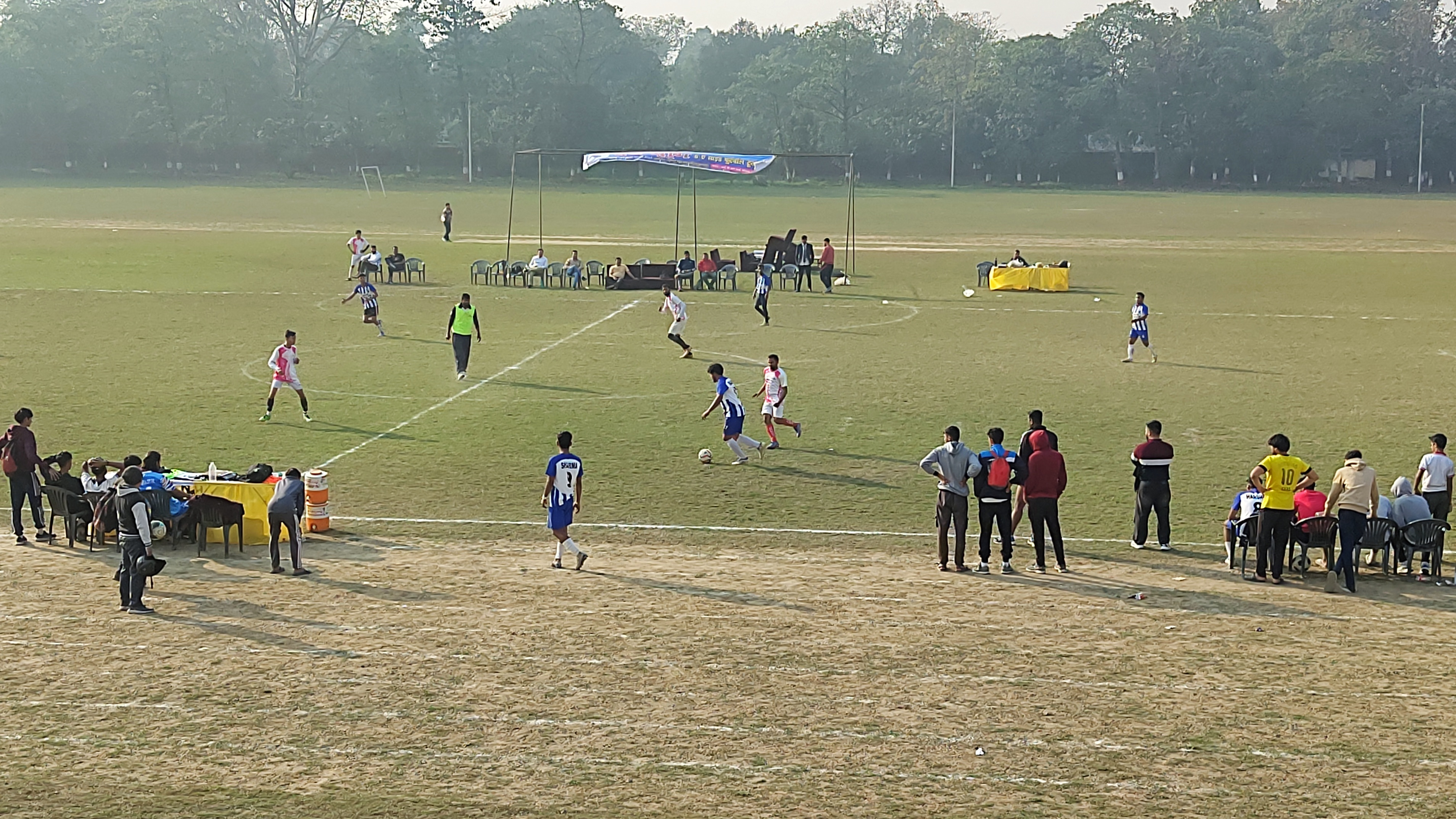
A football league match being played in IVRI Ground.

Bareilly has three sports stadiums and one cricket academy:

- Dori Lal Agarawal Sports Stadium (city area)
- Major Dhyan Chand Sports Stadium (cantonment area)
- Dr. Chandrakanta Memorial Sports Stadium (Bisalpur Road, Bhuta)
- SRMS Cricket Stadium (Bareilly-Nainital Road, Bhojipura)
- 68th under 17 volleyball national championship organised by sgfi in 2024,vidhya bharti was the winner and Seeing the hospitality of Bareilly again 69th under 17 volleyball championship organised by sgfi in nov 2025 in p m shri govt inter college bareilly ground. the manipur boys team and west bangal girls was champian of 2025 under 17.The Games were held from 11 November 2025, to 15 November 2025.

=== Recreation ===
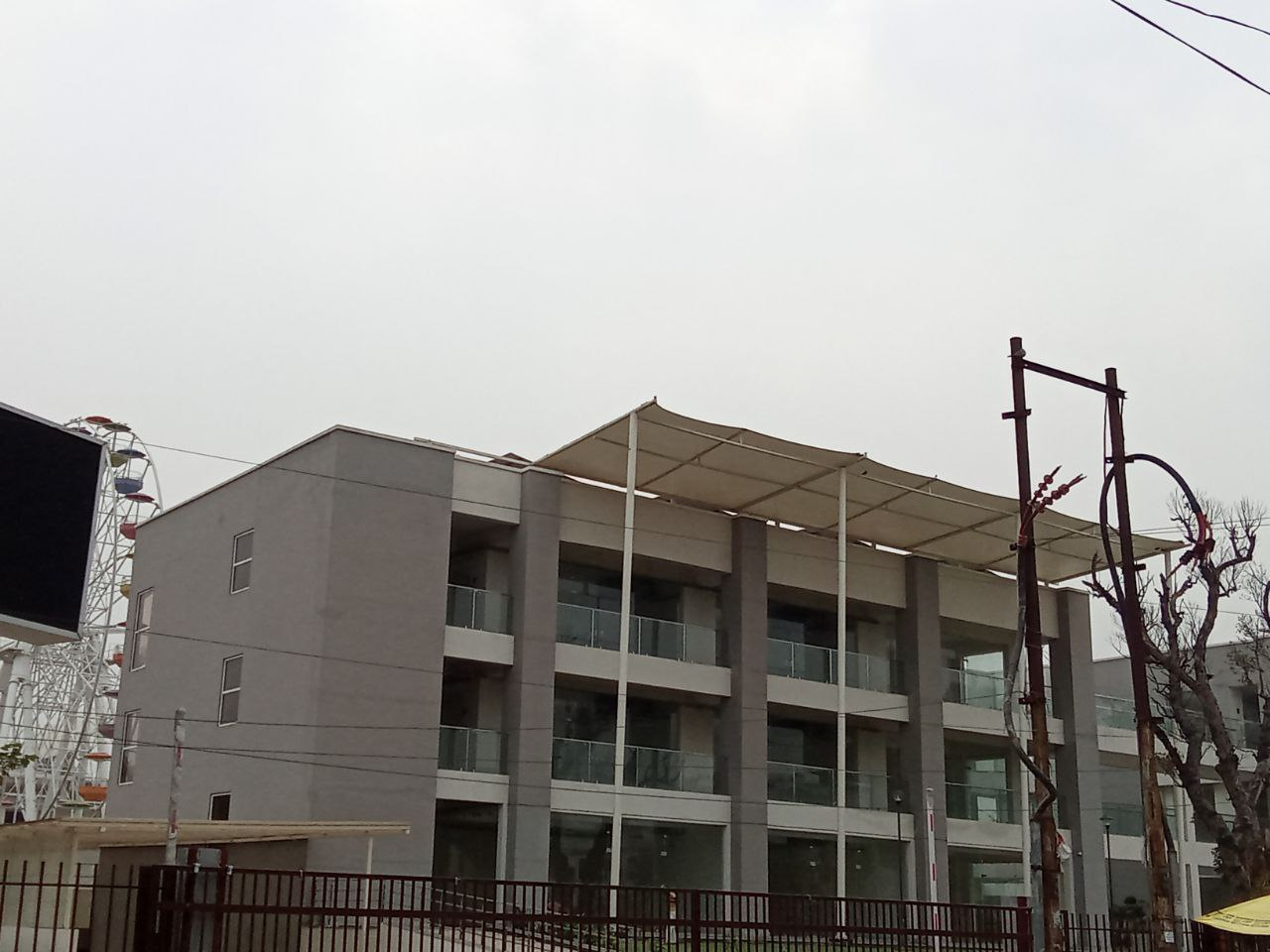
Urban Haat Complex pending inauguration, Civil Lines, Bareilly

The city has a combined amusement and water park named Fun City. Phoenix United Mall (Bareily) is another attraction of the city. It is located on Pilibhit Bypass Road near Mahanagar Colony. The city also has a huge 14 ft. tall "Jhumka" statue installed in the Parsakhera area popularly known as "Jhumka Choraha" representing the significance of song "Jhumka Gira Re" by Asha Bhosle for the film Mera Saaya.

== Notable people ==
- Ahmad Raza Khan Barelvi — Islamic scholar
- Shamsul-hasan Shams Barelvi — Pakistani Islamic scholar and translator
- Santosh Gangwar — governor of Jharkhand
- Rajesh Agarwal — treasurer, Bharatiya Janata Party
- Rati Agnihotri — actress
- Shah Niyaz Ahmad — Sufi mystic and preacher
- Paras Arora — actor
- Wasim Barelvi — Urdu poet
- Clementina Butler — evangelist and author
- Clementina Rowe Butler — missionary
- Priyanka Chopra — actress
- Kanan Gill — actor, comedian
- Mahmud al-Hasan — Sunni Deobandi Islamic scholar
- Anwar Jamal — documentary film maker
- Kritika Kamra — actress
- Akhtar Raza Khan — Islamic scholar
- Hamid Raza Khan — Islamic scholar
- Hassan Raza Khan — Indian scholar and poet
- Kaif Raza Khan — Islamic scholar and activist
- Tauqeer Raza Khan – Islamic scholar and politician
- Arun Kumar — politician, forest minister in Second Yogi Adityanath ministry
- Hiba Nawab — actress
- Disha Patani — Indian actress
- Gopal Swarup Pathak — former Vice-President of India
- Percy Pratt — first-class cricketer
- Sunita Rajwar — actress
- Mustafa Raza Khan Qadri — Islamic scholar
- Priyanka Singh Rawat — member of Parliament, Barabanki
- Clayton Robson — cricketer
- Kavita Seth — playback singer
- Dharmpal Singh — politician
- Paramahansa Yogananda - Indian-American Hindu monk, yogi, and guru

== In popular culture ==
- The 1966 song "Jhumka Gira Re" by Asha Bhosle in the Hindi film Mera Saaya
- The 2017 Hindi film Bareilly Ki Barfi takes Bareilly as its setting
- The 2023 song "What Jhumka?" by Jonita Gandhi, Arijit Singh, Ranveer Singh, Amitabh Bhattacharya and Pritam in the Hindi film Rocky Aur Rani Kii Prem Kahaani

== See also ==
- Bareilly District
- History of Bareilly
- List of Hindu temples in Bareilly
- Neighbourhoods of Bareilly
- Largest Indian cities by GDP

== Sources ==
- Husain, Iqbal (1994). The Rise and Decline of the Ruhela Chieftaincies in 18th Century India. Delhi: Oxford University Press.
- Rao, M.A. (1988). Indian Railways. New Delhi: National Book Trust. ISBN 8123725892.
- Lal, Hira (1987). City and Urban Fringe: A Case Study of Bareilly. Concept Publishing Company. ISBN 978-81-7022-190-6.
- Mohammad, Tufail (1986). Local Finance and Urban Economic Development in U. P. — A Case Study of Shahjahanpur and Bareilly (PDF). Department of Economics, Aligarh Muslim University.
