= Kumaun Express =

Passenger Train in India

Overview
- Service type: Express
- Current operator: North Eastern Railway zone

Route
- Termini: Currently Kasganj Junction railway station, Previously Agra Fort railway station Currently Bareilly City railway station, Previously Kathgodam railway station
- Stops: Currently 04, Previously 22.
- Distance travelled: Currently 108 km (67 mi), Previously 379 km (235 mi)
- Average journey time: Currently 03 hours 00 minutes by 15311 from Kasganj Junction railway station to Bareilly City railway station, Previously 10 hours 30 mins from Agra Fort railway station to Kathgodam railway station.
- Service frequency: 7 Days in a Week
- Train number: 15311 / 15312

On-board services
- Classes: Currently General, Previously First AC, AC 2 Tier, AC 3 Tier, First Class, Sleeper & General.
- Seating arrangements: No
- Sleeping arrangements: Yes
- Catering facilities: On-board Catering, E-Catering
- Observation facilities: ICF coach
- Entertainment facilities: No
- Baggage facilities: No

Technical
- Rolling stock: Standard Indian Railways coaches
- Track gauge: Meter Gauge
- Operating speed: 35.76 kilometres per hour (22.22 mph)(till 2009); 35 kilometres per hour (22 mph)(till 2016)

The Kumaun Express (15311 / 15312) is a passenger train belonging to Indian Railways - North Eastern Railway zone that used to run between Agra Fort railway station and Kathgodam railway station in India. It used to run seven days in a week. Its average speed was 36 km/h. Later it used to run in Kasganj Junction railway station and Bareilly City railway station when Bareilly to Lalkuan and Agra Fort to Kasganj was being made Broad Gauge from Metre Gauge railway line.

== Schedule ==
The 15311 Kumaun Express used to leave Agra Fort railway station on seven days in a week at 21:55 hrs IST and reached Kathgodam railway station at 08.25 hrs IST. Total journey time was of 10 hrs and 30 minutes, running at 35.76 kilometres per hour (22.22 mph) covering 376 kilometres (234 mi) . Later it used to run in Kasganj Junction railway station & Bareilly City railway station when Bareilly to Lalkuan and Agra Fort to Kasganj was being made Broad Gauge from Metre Gauge railway line. Timings were Kasganj Junction railway station departure 09.40 hrs IST and Bareilly City railway station arrival 12.40 hrs, running at 35 kilometres per hour (22 mph), covering 105 kilometres (65 mi). Now it is fully withdrawn from services.

On return, the 15312 Kumaun Express used to leave Kathgodam railway station on seven days in a week at 18.15 hrs IST and reached Agra Fort railway station at 04.45 hrs IST. Total journey time was of 10 hrs and 30 minutes, running at 35.76 kilometres per hour (22.22 mph) covering 376 kilometres (234 mi) . Later it used to run in Kasganj Junction railway station and Bareilly City railway station when Bareilly to Lalkuan and Agra Fort to Kasganj was being made Broad Gauge from Metre Gauge railway line. Timings were Bareilly City railway station departure 22.00 hrs IST and Kasganj Junction railway station arrival 01.00 hrs, running at 35 kilometres per hour (22 mph) covering 105 kilometres (65 mi). Now it is fully withdrawn from services.

But surprise for Agra Fort - Kathgodam railway station passengers as Railways are planning to restore Kumaun Express in Broad Gauge. While Agra Fort departure & Arrival may stay same as the Meter Gauge, Kathgodam railway station arrival & departure is still under planning.

== Important Route and halts ==
- Agra Fort railway station
- Achhnera Junction railway station
- Mathura Junction railway station
- Hathras City railway station
- Kasganj Junction railway station
- Soron Shukar Kshetra railway station
- Ujhani railway station
- Budaun railway station
- Ramganga railway station
- Bareilly Junction railway station
- Bareilly City railway station
- Izzatnagar railway station
- Bhojipura Junction railway station
- Baheri railway station
- Kichha railway station
- Pantnagar railway station
- Lalkuan Junction railway station
- Haldwani railway station
- Kathgodam railway station
