= KSR Bengaluru–Lalkuan Weekly Express =

Train in India

KSR Bengaluru - Lalkuan Weekly Express

Overview
- Service type: Express
- Status: Active
- Locale: Karnataka, Andhra Pradesh, Tamil Nadu, Telangana, Maharashtra, Madhya Pradesh, Uttar Pradesh and Uttarakhand
- First service: 19 September 2026; 1 day ago (Inaugural)
- Current operator: North Eastern Railway (NER)

Route
- Termini: KSR Bengaluru (SBC); Lalkuan Junction (LKU)
- Stops: 42
- Distance travelled: 2,634 km (1,637 mi)
- Average journey time: 49 hrs 50 mins
- Service frequency: Weekly
- Train number: 15301 / 15302

On-board services
- Classes: General Unreserved, Sleeper Class, AC 3 Tier Economy
- Seating arrangements: Yes
- Sleeping arrangements: Yes
- Catering facilities: Pantry Car; On-board Catering; E-Catering
- Observation facilities: Large windows
- Baggage facilities: No
- Other facilities: Below the seats

Technical
- Rolling stock: LHB coach
- Track gauge: 1,676 mm (5 ft 6 in)
- Electrification: 25 kV 50 Hz AC overhead line
- Operating speed: 130 km/h (81 mph) maximum, 53 km/h (33 mph) average including halts.
- Track owner: Indian Railways

The 15301 / 15302 KSR Bengaluru–Lalkuan Weekly Express is an express train belonging to North Eastern Railway zone that runs between the city KSR Bengaluru of Karnataka and Lalkuan Junction of Uttarakhand in India.

It operates as train number 15301 from KSR Bengaluru to Lalkuan Junction and as train number 15302 in the reverse direction, serving the states of Karnataka, Andhra Pradesh, Tamil Nadu, Telangana, Maharashtra, Madhya Pradesh, Uttar Pradesh and Uttarakhand.

== Services ==
- 15301 / KSR Bengaluru–Lalkuan Weekly Express has an average speed of 53 km/h and covers 2634 km in 49h 50m.
- 15302 / Lalkuan–KSR Bengaluru Weekly Express has an average speed of 58 km/h and covers 2634 km in 45h 40m.

== Schedule ==
- 15301 – 7:15 AM (Tuesday) [KSR Bengaluru]
- 15302 – 5:45 PM (Saturday) [Lalkuan Junction]

== Routes and halts ==
The important halts of the train are :

- KSR Bengaluru
- Bengaluru Cantonment
- Krishnarajapuram
- Bangarapet Junction
- Kuppam
- Jolarpettai Junction
- Katpadi Junction
- Renigunta Junction
- GudurJunction
- Nellore
- Ongole
- Tenali Junction
- Vijayawada Junction
- Khammam
- Mahabubabad
- Warangal
- Peddapalli Junction
- Manchiryal
- Sirpur Kaghaznagar
- Balharshah Junction
- Chandrapur
- Sevagram Junction
- Nagpur Junction
- Betul
- Itarsi Junction
- Rani Kamalapati
- Bina Junction
- Jhansi Junction
- Gwalior Junction
- Agra Cantonment
- Mathura Junction
- Mathura Cantt
- Hathras Junction
- Kasganj Junction
- Budaun
- Bareilly Junction
- Bareilly City
- Izzatnagar
- Bhojipura Junction
- Baheri
- Kichha
- Lalkuan Junction

== Coach composition ==
The train has 16 coaches are :

1. General Unreserved - 2
2. Sleeper Class - 4
3. AC 3rd Class Economy - 10

== Traction ==
As the entire route is fully electrified, it is hauled by a Royapuram Loco Shed-based WAP-7 electric locomotive from KSR Bengaluru to Lalkuan Junction and vice versa.

== Rake reversal or rake share ==
No rake reversal or rake share.

== See also ==
Trains from KSR Bengaluru :

1. KSR Bengaluru–Ernakulam Intercity Express
2. KSR Bengaluru–Dharwad Vande Bharat Express
3. Shivamogga Town–KSR Bengaluru Jan Shatabdi Express
4. Karnataka Express
5. KSR Bangalore–Bhagat Ki Kothi Express (via Ballari)

Trains from Lalkuan Junction :

1. Lalkuan–Amritsar Superfast Express
2. Howrah–Lalkuan Express
3. Lalkuan–Anand Vihar Terminal Intercity Express

== Notes ==
a. Runs a day in a week with both directions.
