= Ruhelkhand Express =

Train in India

Overview
- Service type: Express
- First service: 7 May 1984; 42 years ago
- Current operator: North Eastern Railway

Route
- Termini: Bareilly Junction; Lucknow Aishbagh
- Stops: 10
- Distance travelled: 317 km (197 mi)
- Average journey time: 7 hours 30 minutes
- Service frequency: 6 Days a Week
- Train number: 15309 / 15310

On-board services
- Class: General Unreserved
- Seating arrangements: No
- Sleeping arrangements: Yes
- Auto-rack arrangements: Overhead racks
- Catering facilities: No
- Observation facilities: Large windows
- Baggage facilities: No
- Other facilities: Below the seats

Technical
- Rolling stock: ICF coach
- Operating speed: 35 km/h (22 mph) average including halts.

The 15309 / 15310 Ruhelkhand Express is an express train belonging to Indian Railways - North Eastern Railway zone that runs between Bareilly Junction railway station and Aishbagh railway station in India. It has 13 coaches, out of 9 are General coaches, 2 Coaches are for AC and 2 for luggage. This train is currently cancelled due to gauge conversion.

== Route and halts ==
- Bhojipura Junction railway station (BPR)
- Bijauria Junction railway station (BJV)
- Pilibhit Junction railway station (PBE)
- Puranpur railway station (PP)
- Mailani Junction railway station (MLN)
- Gola Gokarannath railway station (GK)
- Lakhimpur railway station (LMP)
- Hargaon railway station (HA)
- Sitapur City Junction railway station (SPC)
- Sidhauli railway station (SD)
- Ataria railway station (AA)
- Mohibullapur railway station (MBP)
- Daliganj Junction railway station (DAL)
- Lucknow City railway station (LC)

== Coach Composition ==
- 11 General Seating Coaches
- 2 Seating cum Luggage Rake

Loco	1	2	3	4	5	6	7	8	9	10	11	12	13
	SLR	GS	GS	GS	GS	GS	GS	GS	GS	GS	GS	GS	SLR
