= Sheikhupur railway station =

Railway station in Uttar Pradesh

- Indian Railways logo

General information
- Location: State Highway 33, Sheikhupur, Uttar Pradesh; India
- Coordinates: 28.0034°N 79.0976°E
- Elevation: 175 metres (574 ft)
- System: Indian Railways station
- Owner: Indian Railways
- Operator: North Eastern Railway
- Platforms: 2
- Tracks: 3
- Connections: Auto stand

Construction
- Structure type: Standard (on-ground station)
- Parking: No
- Cycle facilities: No

Other information
- Status: Single electric line
- Station code: SKW
- Zone(s): North Eastern Railway
- Division(s): Izzatnagar
Location
- Location within India Location within Uttar Pradesh

Sheikhupur railway station is a main railway station in Badaun district, Uttar Pradesh. Its code is SKW. It serves Sheikhupur city. The station consists of two platforms. The platforms are not well sheltered. It lacks many facilities including water and sanitation.

Trains are available for Bareilly, Ramnagar, Agra, Mumbai, Vadodara, Surat, Mathura, Kota etc.

== Trains ==
Train name	Train number	Arrival	Departure	Train origin	Train destination
Kasganj–Bareilly City Passenger	55343	07:44	07:46	Kasganj Junction	Bareilly City railway station
Lalkuan–Kasganj Passenger	52202	19:15	19:20	Lalkuan Junction	Kasganj Junction
Kasganj–Tanakpur Passenger	52203	12:15	12:20	Kasganj Junction	Tanakpur railway station
Tanakpur–Bareilly Passenger	52203	14:25	14:30	Tanakpur railway station	Kasganj Junction
Kasganj–Pilibhit Passenger	52205	15:11	15:16	Kasganj Junction	Pilibhit Junction
Pilibhit–Kasganj Passenger	52206	09:06	09:11	Pilibhit Junction	Kasganj Junction
Kasganj–Bareilly Passenger	52217	22:35	22:40	Kasganj Junction	Bareilly Junction
Bareilly–Kasganj Passenger	52218	20:25	20:30	Bareilly Junction	Kasganj Junction
