= Lucknow Junction–Kathgodam Express =

Express train service in India

Overview
- Service type: Express
- First service: 7 February 2015; 11 years ago
- Current operator: North Eastern Railway zone

Route
- Termini: Lucknow Junction (LJN); Kathgodam (KGM)
- Stops: 9
- Distance travelled: 341 km (212 mi)
- Average journey time: 10h 5m
- Service frequency: Tri-weekly (Note: Runs three days in a week for every direction.)
- Train number: 15043/15044

On-board services
- Classes: AC 2 tier, AC 3 tier, Sleeper class, General Unreserved
- Seating arrangements: No
- Sleeping arrangements: Yes
- Catering facilities: On-board catering E-catering
- Observation facilities: LHB coach
- Entertainment facilities: No
- Baggage facilities: No
- Other facilities: Below the seats

Technical
- Rolling stock: 2
- Track gauge: 1,676 mm (5 ft 6 in)
- Operating speed: 34 km/h (21 mph), including halts

The Lucknow Junction–Kathgodam Express is an Express train belonging to North Eastern Railway zone that runs between Lucknow Junction and Kathgodam in India. It is currently being operated with 15043/15044 train numbers on a tri-weekly basis.

== Service ==
The 15043/Lucknow Jn.–Kathgodam Express has an average speed of 34 km/h and covers 341 km in 10h 5m. The 15044/Kathgodam–Lucknow Jn. Express has an average speed of 44 km/h and covers 341 km in 7h 50m.

== Route and halts ==
The important halts of the train are:

- Lucknow Junction
- Bareilly Junction
- Bareilly City
- Izzatnagar
- Bhojipura Junction
- Baheri
- Kichha
- Pantnagar
- Lalkuan Junction
- Haldwani
- Kathgodam

== Coach composition ==
The train has standard ICF rakes with a max speed of 110 kmph. The train consists of 17 coaches:

- 1 AC II Tier
- 3 AC Chair Car
- 2 Second Sitting
- 3 Sleeper coaches
- 6 General Unreserved
- 2 Seating cum Luggage Rake

== Traction ==
Both trains are hauled by a Gonda Loco Shed-based WAP-7 diesel locomotive from Lucknow to Kathgodam and vice versa.

== See also ==
- Lucknow Junction railway station
- Kathgodam railway station
