= Ramganga railway station =

Railway station in Uttar Pradesh

General information
- Location: Bareilly, Uttar Pradesh; India
- Coordinates: 27.9952°N 79.0151°E
- Elevation: 175 metres (574 ft)
- System: Indian Railways station
- Owner: Indian Railways
- Operator: North Eastern Railway
- Platforms: 1
- Tracks: 2

Construction
- Structure type: Standard (on ground station)
- Parking: No
- Cycle facilities: No

Other information
- Status: Single electric line
- Station code: RGB
- Zone(s): North Eastern Railway
- Division(s): Izzatnagar
Location
- Location within India Location within Uttar Pradesh

Ramganga railway station is a small railway station in Bareilly district, Uttar Pradesh. Its code is RGB.

== Passing trains ==
Train name	Train number	Source	Destination
Bareilly–Delhi Passenger	54077	Bareilly Junction	Old Delhi Railway station
Delhi–Bareilly Passenger	54078	Old Delhi Railway station	Bareilly Junction
Bandikui–Bareilly Passenger	54461	Bandikui Junction	Bareilly Junction
Bareilly–Bandikui Passenger	54462	Bareilly Junction	Bandikui Junction
Bareilly–Moradabad Passenger	54311	Bareilly Junction	Moradabad
Aligarh–Bareilly Passenger	54351	Aligarh Junction	Bareilly Junction
ALJN–BE Passenger	54353	Aligarh Junction	Bareilly Junction
BE–ALJN Passenger	54352	Bareilly Junction	Aligarh Junction
Moradabad–Bareilly Passenger	54312	Moradabad	Bareilly Junction
Bareilly–Aligarh Passenger	54352	Bareilly Junction	Moradabad
Kumaun Express	15312	Kasganj Junction	Bareilly City
Kasganj–Lalkuan Passenger	52201	Kasganj Junction	Lalkuan Junction
Lalkuan–Kasganj Passenger	52202	Lalkuan Junction	Kasganj Junction
Kasganj–Tanakpur Passenger	52203	Kasganj Junction	Tanakpur
Tanakpur–Bareilly Passenger	52204	Tanakpur	Bareilly Junction
Kasganj–Pilibhit Passenger	52205	Kasganj Junction	Pilibhit Junction
Pilibhit–Kasganj Passenger	52206	Pilibhit Junction	Kasganj Junction
