= Daliganj Junction railway station =

Railway station in Uttar Pradesh, India

General information
- Location: Daliganj, Lucknow, Uttar Pradesh, India
- Coordinates: 26°49′55″N 80°55′08″E
- Elevation: 123.500 metres (405.18 ft)
- System: Terminal, Junction
- Owner: Indian Railways
- Lines: Aishbagh-Bareilly Section (Vaya Sitapur, Pilibhit); Barabanki–Lucknow Suburban Railway
- Platforms: 4
- Tracks: 5
- Connections: Taxi stand, Auto stand

Construction
- Structure type: Standard on-ground station
- Parking: Available
- Cycle facilities: Available
- Accessible: Daliganj NER

Other information
- Status: Functioning
- Station code: DAL
- Fare zone: Northern Eastern Railway, Lucknow NER railway division

History
- Rebuilt: 2016, 2024
- Former names: Oudh and Rohilkhand Railway / East Indian Railway Company
- Computerized Ticketing Counters Luggage Checking System Parking Disabled Access Food Plaza Kiosks WC Taxi Stand Public Transportation
Location

Daliganj Junction railway station is one of the suburban railway stations in Lucknow district, Uttar Pradesh. Its code is DAL. The station serves as a terminal for Local Passenger Trains that run between Mailani, Sitapur and Lucknow. Lines coming from Aishbagh Jn. (South Bound) diverge here to Sitapur and Mailani Jn. (North Bound) & Malhaur Jn. (East Bound).

== Related projects ==
=== Amrit Bharat Station Scheme ===
Amrit Bharat Station Scheme is an ongoing Indian Railways mission launched in February 2023 by the Ministry of Railways to redevelop 1275 stations nationwide. Daliganj Jn. is one of the 1275 stations being redeveloped.

Amrit Bharat Station scheme envisages development of stations on a continuous basis with a long-term approach. It involves preparation of Master Plans and their implementation in phases to improve the amenities at the stations like improvement of station access, circulating areas, waiting halls, toilets, lift/escalators as necessary, cleanliness, free Wi-Fi, kiosks for local products through schemes like ‘One Station One Product’, better passenger information systems, Executive Lounges, nominated spaces for business meetings, landscaping etc. keeping in view the necessity at each station.

The scheme also envisages improvement of building, integrating the station with both sides of the city, multimodal integration, amenities for Divyangjans, sustainable and environment friendly solutions, provision of ballastless tracks, ‘Roof Plazas’ as per necessity, phasing and feasibility and creation of city centres at the station in the long term.

=== Aishbagh Junction terminal ===
This project was started on 1 May along with gauge conversion from metre to broad gauge from the very same station to Pilibhit. In this project North Eastern railway has develop this station as terminal and major junction. Six platforms have been constructed along with an entirely new large station building and dual entrance.

=== Gauge conversion ===
This project started on 15 May 2016. Under this project metre-gauge lines from Lucknow to Tanakpur will be converted to broad gauge under three phases, where first phase Aishbagh to Sitapur was completed by 2020. The second phase Sitapur to Mailani was completed in 2022 and the entire trackwork to Pilibhit was completed in March 2024.

=== Aishbagh–Manaknagar bypass ===
Under this project a one-kilometer rail track has been constructed from Aishbagh station to Manak nagar through RDSO area of the city so that long-distance trains for Gorakhpur can directly pass from Aishbagh to Manak Nagar without going to Lucknow Junction and thus avoiding the time loss in loco reversal.

=== Gomti Nagar Terminal ===
Under this project, NER has developed a world-class railway station at Gomti Nagar. Six platforms have been made here connected via levelled concourse. This station now also acts as terminal for a few north- and northeast-bound trains (like for Patna, Kamakhya, Godda, etc.)

=== Circular train ===
Honorable Home Minister Rajnath Singh Ji has announced that a local train just like that of Mumbai will run on Aishbagh–Lucknow city–Daliganj–Badshahnagar–Gomtinagar–Malhour–Juggaur–Malhour–Dilkusha–Gwarigaon–Charbagh route to ease the pressure on the roads. The reports are already submitted and date for starting the project will soon be announced.

=== ASH–MAL doubling and electrification ===
NER completed track doubling and electrification of the rail track from Aishbagh to Malhour via Rakabganj, Badshah Nagar and Gomti Nagar in 2023.

== Trains ==
Train no.	Train name	Train origin	Train destination
55032	Daliganj-Nakaha Jungle Passenger	Daliganj Junction	Nakaha jungle Gorakhpur
55049	Nakha Jungle–Daliganj Passenger	Nakha Jungle railway station	Daliganj Junction
15309	Ruhelkhand Express	Pilibhit Junction railway station	Aishbagh railway station
15310	Ruhelkhand Express	Aishbagh railway station	Pilibhit Junction railway station
55062	Lucknow Jn.–Sitapur Jn. Passenger	Lucknow Junction railway station	Sitapur City Junction railway station
64232	Lucknow Jn.–Barabanki MEMU	Lucknow Junction railway station	Barabanki Junction railway station
55064	DaliGanj Jn.–Sitapur Jn. Passenger	Daliganj Junction	Sitapur City Junction railway station
64271	Barabanki–Aishbagh MEMU	Barabanki Junction railway station	Aishbagh railway station
64234	Lucknow Jn.–Barabanki MEMU	Lucknow Junction railway station	Barabanki Junction railway station
55065	Sitapur–Lucknow Passenger	Sitapur City Junction railway station	Lucknow Junction railway station
64273	Barabanki–Lucknow Jn MEMU	Barabanki Junction railway station	Lucknow Junction railway station
64274	Lucknow Jn–Barabanki MEMU	Lucknow Junction railway station	Barabanki Junction railway station
55066	Lucknow Jn.–Lakhimpur Passenger	Lucknow Junction railway station	Lakhimpur railway station
55031	Nakaha Jungle–Lucknow Jn. Passenger	Nakaha Jungle railway station	Lucknow Junction railway station
64275	Barabanki–Lucknow Jn. MEMU	Barabanki Junction railway station	Lucknow Junction railway station

EMU/MEMU/DEMU services from Daliganj

STATION	SERVICE
LJN–BARABANKI	MEMU
LJN–Sitapur	MEMU (proposed)
LJN–GONDA	DEMU (proposed)
