= Lalkuan =

- Town
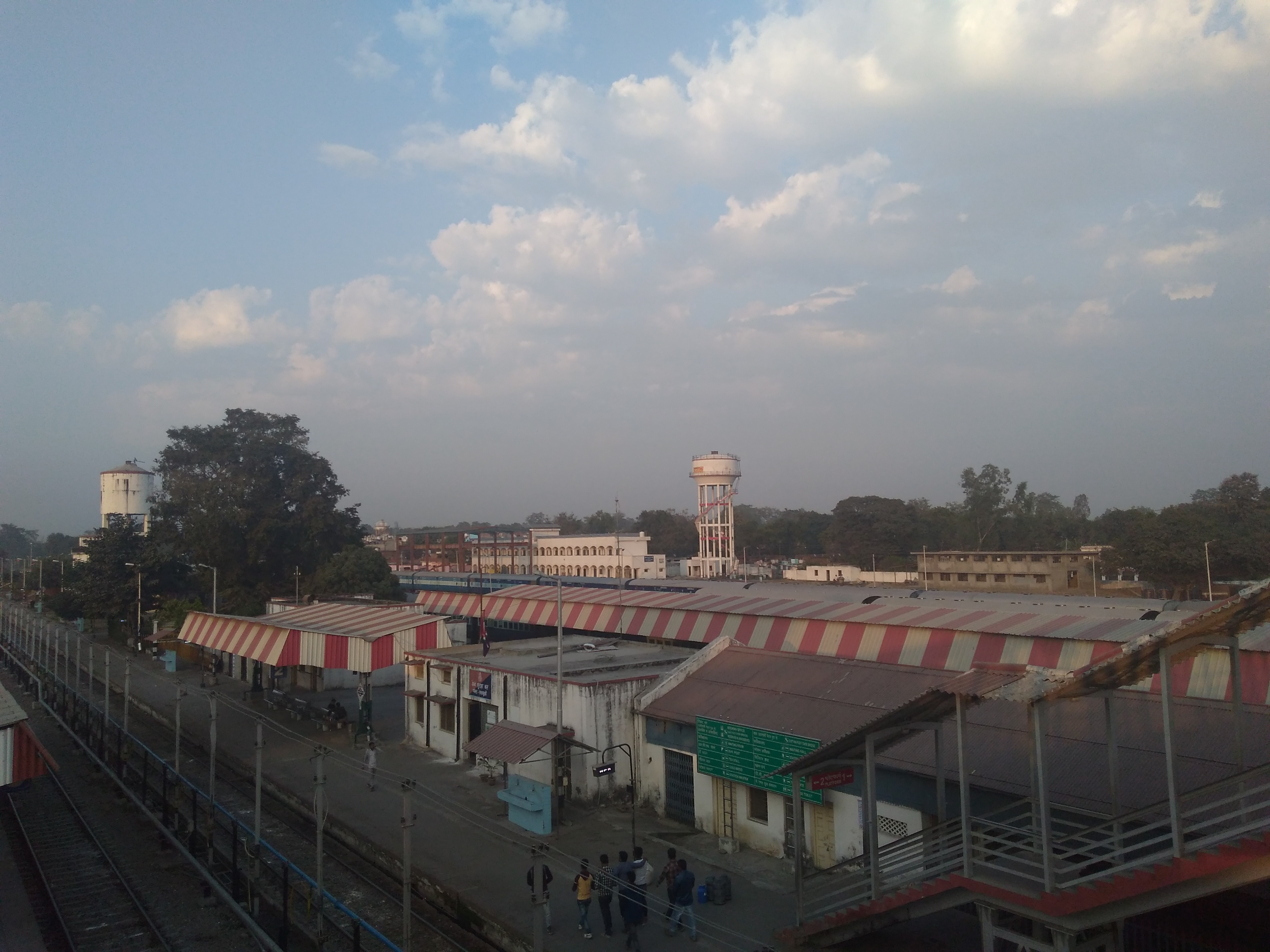
- View from Lalkuan Junction railway station

- Location in Uttarakhand, India Lalkuan (India)
- Coordinates: 29.08°N 79.52°E
- Country: India
- State: Uttarakhand
- District: Nainital
- Elevation: 371 m (1,217 ft)

Population (2011)
  - Total: 7,644

Languages
  - Official: Hindi
  - Native: Kauravi, Tharu
- Time zone: UTC+5:30 (IST)
- Vehicle registration: UK-04
- Website: uk.gov.in

Lalkuan is a Nagar Panchayat in the Nainital district of the Indian state of Uttarakhand. It is also part of the Lalkuan Assembly constituency of Uttarakhand Legislative Assembly.

== Demographics ==
In the 2011 India census, Lalkuan had a population of 7,644. Males constituted 55% of the population and females 45%. Lalkuan had an average literacy rate of 75%, higher than the national average of 59.5%: male literacy was 76% and female literacy was 74%. In Lalkuan, 12% of the population was under 6 years of age. Hindi, Kumauni and Punjabi are the main languages spoken there.

== Geography ==
It is situated 80 km from Bareilly on Nainital Road, 24 km from Rudrapur, 6 km from Pantnagar Airport, and 16 km from Haldwani.

== Transport ==
Howrah–Lalkuan Express, Lalkuan–Anand Vihar Terminal Intercity Express and Lalkuan–Amritsar Superfast Express start from the Lalkuan Junction railway station.
