= Clutterbuckganj railway station =

Railway station in Uttar Pradesh

- Indian Railways logo

General information
- Location: C.B. Ganj, Bareilly, Uttar Pradesh; India
- Coordinates: 28.396755°N 79.371593°E
- Elevation: 172 metres (564 ft)
- System: Indian Railways station
- Owner: Indian Railways
- Operator: Northern Railway
- Line: Lucknow–Moradabad line
- Platforms: 3
- Connections: Auto stand

Construction
- Structure type: Standard (on-ground station)
- Parking: No
- Cycle facilities: No

Other information
- Station code: CBJ
- Zone(s): Northern Railway
- Division(s): Moradabad
Location
- Location within Uttar Pradesh Location within India

Clutterbuckganj railway station (station code: CBJ) is a railway station on the Lucknow–Moradabad line located in the C.B. Ganj neighbourhood of Bareilly in Uttar Pradesh, India. It is under the administrative control of the Moradabad Division of the Northern Railway zone of the Indian Railways.

The station consists of three platforms, and is located at a distance of 8 kilometres (5.0 mi) from Bareilly Junction and 10 kilometres (6.2 mi) from Bareilly city. Three trains (Two Passenger / One Express) stop at the station.

== Gallery ==
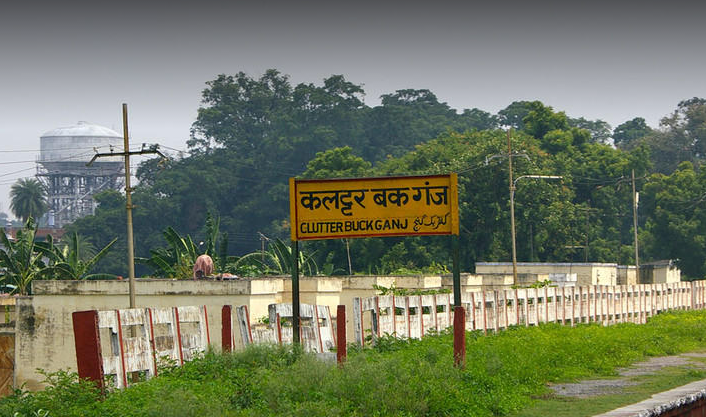
Platform Board of Clutterbuckganj station.
