= Sikandra Rao railway station =

Railway station in Uttar Pradesh

- Indian Railways logo

General information
- Location: Soron, Uttar Pradesh; India
- Coordinates: 27.499066°N 78.210794°E
- Elevation: 177 metres (581 ft)
- System: Indian Railways station
- Owner: Indian Railways
- Operator: North Eastern Railway
- Platforms: 2
- Connections: Auto stand

Construction
- Structure type: At grade
- Parking: No
- Cycle facilities: No

Other information
- Status: Single diesel line
- Station code: SKA
- Zone(s): North Eastern Railway
- Division(s): Izzatnagar
Location
- Location within India Location within Uttar Pradesh

Sikandra Rao railway station is a small railway station in Hathras district, Uttar Pradesh. Its code is SKA and serves the town of Sikandra Rao. The station consists of two platforms, and falls under Izzatnagar railway division.

== Trains ==
Train name	Train number	Arrival	Departure	Train origin	Train destination
AF RMR EXP	15055	16:07	16:09	Agra Fort	Ramnagar
RMR AF EXP	15056	00:55	00:57	Ramnagar	Agra Fort
Kasganj Achhnera Fast Passenger	55337	06:01	06:02	Kasganj Junction	Achhnera Junction
Achhnera Kasganj Fast Passenger	55338	13:43	13:44	Achhnera Junction	Kasganj Junction
Ahmedabad–Gorakhpur Express	19409	05:36	05:38	Ahmedabad Junction	Gorakhpur Junction
Gorakhpur–Ahmedabad Express	19410	17:26	17:28	Gorakhpur Junction	Ahmedabad Junction
Kasganj–Mathura Passenger	55353	21:45	21:47	Kasganj Junction	Mathura Junction
Mathura–Kasganj Passenger	55354	07:41	07:43	Mathura Junction	Kasganj Junction
