= Ujhani railway station =

Railway station in Uttar Pradesh

Ujhani railway station, Ujhani
- Indian Railways logo

General information
- Location: Ujhani Budaun, Uttar Pradesh; India
- Coordinates: 27.9952°N 79.0151°E
- Elevation: 175 metres (574 ft)
- System: Indian Railways station
- Owner: Indian Railways
- Operator: North Eastern Railway
- Platforms: 1
- Tracks: 2
- Connections: Auto stand

Construction
- Structure type: At grade
- Parking: No
- Cycle facilities: No

Other information
- Status: Single electric line
- Station code: UJH
- Zone(s): North Eastern Railway
- Division(s): Izzatnagar
Location
- Location within India Location within Uttar Pradesh

Ujhani railway station is a small railway station in Budaun district, Uttar Pradesh, Northern India. Its code is UJH. It serves Ujhani city. The station consists of one platform. The platforms are not well sheltered. It lacks many facilities including water and sanitation.

== Passing trains ==
Train name	Train number	Arrival	Departure	Train origin	Train destination
Kasganj–Bareilly City Fast Passenger	55359	22:37	22:39	Kasganj Junction	Bareilly City
Bareilly City–Kasganj Fast Passenger	55360	22:08	22:10	Bareilly City	Kasganj Junction
Kasganj–Bareilly City Passenger	55343	07:34	07:36	Kasganj Junction	Bareilly City
Bareilly City–Kasganj Passenger	55344	09:22	09:24	Bareilly City	Kasganj Junction
Kasganj–Bareilly City Passenger	55345	10:39	10:41	Kasganj Junction	Bareilly City
Bareilly City–Kasganj Passenger	55346	11:55	11:57	Bareilly City	Kasganj Junction
Kasganj–Bareilly City Passenger	55355	14:06	14:08	Kasganj Junction	Bareilly City
Bareilly City–Kasganj Passenger	55356	14:53	14:55	Bareilly City	Kasganj Junction
Agra Fort–Ramnagar Weekly Express	15055	17:41	17:43	Agra Fort	Ramnagar
Agra Fort–Ramnagar Weekly Express	15056	23:06	23:08	Ramnagar	Agra Fort
Kasganj–Bareilly City Passenger	55357	18:20	18:22	Kasganj Junction	Bareilly City
Bareilly City–Kasganj Passenger	55358	18:54	18:56	Bareilly City	Kasganj Junction
