= Soron Shukar Kshetra railway station =

Railway station in Uttar Pradesh

General information
- Location: Soron, Uttar Pradesh; India
- Coordinates: 27.884097°N 78.749190°E
- Elevation: 178 metres (584 ft)
- System: Indian Railways station
- Owner: Indian Railways
- Operator: North Eastern Railway
- Platforms: 2
- Connections: Auto stand

Construction
- Structure type: At grade
- Parking: No
- Cycle facilities: No

Other information
- Status: Single electric line
- Station code: SRNK
- Zone(s): North Eastern Railway
- Division(s): Izzatnagar
Location
- Location within India Location within Uttar Pradesh

Soron Shukar Kshetra railway station is a small railway station in Kasganj district, Uttar Pradesh. Its code is SRNK. It serves Soron city. The station consists of two platforms. The platforms are not well sheltered. This railway station looks like a religious place. The station is designed like a temple. Two statues of God Varaha are placed at the main gate.

== Passing trains ==
| Train name | Train number | Arrival | Departure | Train origin | Train destination |
|---|---|---|---|---|---|
| Kasganj–Bareilly City Fast Passenger | 55359 | 22:03 | 22:05 | Kasganj Junction | Bareilly City |
| Bareilly City–Kasganj Fast Passenger | 55360 | 22:58 | 23:00 | Bareilly City | Kasganj Junction |
| Kasganj–Bareilly City Passenger | 55343 | 06:50 | 06:52 | Kasganj Junction | Bareilly City |
| Bareilly City–Kasganj Passenger | 55344 | 10:16 | 10:18 | Bareilly City | Kasganj Junction |
| Kasganj–Bareilly City Passenger | 55345 | 09:55 | 09:57 | Kasganj Junction | Bareilly City |
| Bareilly City–Kasganj Passenger | 55346 | 12:41 | 12:43 | Bareilly City | Kasganj Junction |
| Kasganj–Bareilly City Passenger | 55355 | 13:21 | 13:23 | Kasganj Junction | Bareilly City |
| Bareilly City–Kasganj Passenger | 55356 | 15:48 | 15:50 | Bareilly City | Kasganj Junction |
| AF RMR EXP | 15055 | 17:11 | 17:13 | Agra Fort | Ramnagar |
| RMR AF EXP | 15056 | 23:36 | 23:38 | Ramnagar | Agra Fort |
| Kasganj–Bareilly City Passenger | 55357 | 17:36 | 17:38 | Kasganj Junction | Bareilly City |
| Bareilly City–Kasganj Passenger | 55358 | 19:48 | 19:50 | Bareilly City | Kasganj Junction |
