= Parsa Khera railway station =

Railway station in Uttar Pradesh

- Indian Railways logo

General information
- Location: Parsa Khera, Bareilly, Uttar Pradesh; India
- Coordinates: 28.4290654°N 79.3444705°E
- Elevation: 170 metres (560 ft)
- System: Indian Railways station
- Owner: Indian Railways
- Operator: Northern Railway
- Line: Lucknow–Moradabad line
- Platforms: 2
- Connections: Auto stand

Construction
- Structure type: Standard (on-ground station)
- Parking: No
- Cycle facilities: No

Other information
- Station code: PKRA
- Zone(s): Northern Railway
- Division(s): Moradabad
Location
- Location within Uttar Pradesh Location within India

Parsa Khera railway station (station code: PKRA) is a railway station on the Lucknow–Moradabad line located in village Parsa Khera of Bareilly district in Uttar Pradesh, India. It is under the administrative control of the Moradabad Division of the Northern Railway zone of the Indian Railways.

The station consists of two platforms, and is located at a distance of 13 kilometres (8.1 mi) from Bareilly Junction. Two Passenger trains stop at the station.
