= Gokul Express =

Express Train in India

Overview
- Service type: Express
- Current operator: North Eastern Railway zone

Route
- Termini: Currently during last run Gonda Junction railway station Currently during last run Mailani Junction railway station
- Stops: 10
- Distance travelled: 266 km (165 mi)
- Average journey time: 06 hours 40 minutes by 15315/15316 between Gonda Junction railway station to Mailani Junction railway station
- Service frequency: 6 Days in a Week
- Train number: 15315 / 15316

On-board services
- Class: General
- Seating arrangements: No
- Sleeping arrangements: Yes
- Catering facilities: On-board Catering, E-Catering
- Observation facilities: ICF coach
- Entertainment facilities: No
- Baggage facilities: No

Technical
- Rolling stock: Standard Indian Railways coaches
- Operating speed: 39.90 kilometres per hour (24.79 mph)

The Gokul Express (15315 / 15316) was an express train belonging to Indian Railways - North Eastern Railway zone that used to runs between Gonda Junction railway station and Mailani Junction railway station in India. The train last ran on 2016 & was permanently withdrawn due to gauge conversion of Gonda Junction - Nanpara Junction Meter Gauge Line in Broad Gauge Line.

== History ==
Gokul Express started its journey from 1966 between Lucknow Junction railway station to Sitapur Junction railway station. The train was extended to Mailani in 1980s & then to Mathura via Pilibhit, Bareilly & hence Lucknow-Mathura Exp. was named Mathura-Lucknow Jn. Gokul Express & then it was terminated till Bareilly as Mathura Bareilly Gokul Express. In 1995-96 rail budget, it was announced that Mathura-Bareilly Gokul Exp. was extended on both ends to Gonda & Agra fort. Stopping at Achhnera Junction, Mathura Junction, Kasganj Junction, Budaun, Bareilly Junction, Izzatnagar, Pilibhit Junction, Mailani Junction railway station, Paliakalan, Dudhwa Junction, Nanpara Junction, Bahraich, Gonda Junction railway station, this train used to cover the distance in 20 hours 15 minutes with average speed of 40.3 kilometres per hour (25.0 mph). It was one of the fastest Meter Gauge train in India. After Agra Fort-Achhnera Junction-Mathura Junction-Kasganj Junction-Bareilly Junction-Pilibhit Junction-Mailani Junction railway station-Sitapur-Lucknow Jn. line became Broad gauge, the service was confined between Gonda Junction railway station and Mailani Junction railway station until 2016.

== Timings & Schedule ==
Timings Before Gauge conversion was: (As MG316 Down) Agra Fort 13.30; Mathura Junction 15.15; Kasganj Junction 17.35; Bareilly Junction 19.55; Pilibhit Junction 21.20; Mailani Junction railway station 22.45/23.15(reversal); Nanpara Junction 03.45; Gonda Junction railway station 06.20;|| (As MG315 Up) Gonda Junction railway station 19.50; Nanpara Junction 22.20; Mailani Junction railway station 02.50/03.20(reversal); Pilibhit Junction 04.50; Bareilly Junction 06.20; Kasganj Junction 08.40; Mathura Junction 11.10; Agra Fort 12.45. Covering 816 kilometres (507 mi) in 20 hrs 15 mins with average speed of 40.3 kilometres per hour (25.0 mph) Timings during 2009 was: (As 5316 Down) Mathura Junction 15.15; Kasganj Junction 17.35; Bareilly Junction 19.55; Pilibhit Junction 21.20; Mailani Junction railway station 22.45/23.15(reversal); Nanpara Junction 03.45; Gonda Junction railway station 06.15; (As 5315 Up) Gonda Junction railway station 19.45; Nanpara Junction 22.15; Mailani Junction railway station 02.45/03.15(reversal); Pilibhit Junction 04.45; Bareilly Junction 06.15; Kasganj Junction 08.40; Mathura Junction 11.00. Covering 601 kilometres (373 mi) in 15 hrs 15 mins with average speed of 39.40 kilometres per hour (24.48 mph). Timings during 2016 was:- (As 15316 Down) Mailani Junction railway station 00.20; Nanpara Junction 04.40; Gonda Junction railway station 07.00; (As 15315 Up) Gonda Junction railway station 19.50; Nanpara Junction 22.15; Mailani Junction railway station 02.30. Covering 266 kilometres (165 mi) in 6 hrs 40 mins with average speed of 39.90 kilometres per hour (24.79 mph)
