= Tisua railway station =

Railway station in Uttar Pradesh

- Indian Railways logo

General information
- Location: Tisua, Bareilly, Uttar Pradesh; India
- Coordinates: 28.1514882°N 79.5505518°E
- Elevation: 165 metres (541 ft)
- System: Indian Railways station
- Owner: Indian Railways
- Operator: Northern Railway
- Line: Lucknow–Moradabad line
- Platforms: 1
- Connections: Auto stand

Construction
- Structure type: Standard (on-ground station)

Other information
- Station code: TSA
- Zone(s): Northern Railway
- Division(s): Moradabad
Location
- Location within Uttar Pradesh Location within India

Tisua railway station (station code: TSA) is a railway station on the Lucknow–Moradabad line located in village Tisua of Bareilly district in Uttar Pradesh, India. It is under the administrative control of the Moradabad Division of the Northern Railway zone of the Indian Railways.

The station consists of one platform, and is located at a distance of 28 kilometres (17 mi) from Bareilly Junction. Five trains (Four Passenger / One Express) stop at the station.
