= Howrah–Lalkuan Express =

Passenger train in India

Howrah-Lalkuan Superfast Express
Overview
- Service type: Express
- Locale: 30 June 2012; 13 years ago
- First service: 30 June 2012; 13 years ago
- Current operator: Eastern Railway

Route
- Termini: Howrah Junction (HWH); Lalkuan Junction (LKU)
- Stops: 17
- Distance travelled: 1,303 km (810 mi)
- Average journey time: 22 hours 40 minutes
- Service frequency: Weekly (Note: Runs one days in a week for every direction.)
- Train number: 12351 / 12352

On-board services
- Classes: AC 2 tier, AC 3 tier, Sleeper Class, General Unreserved
- Seating arrangements: No
- Sleeping arrangements: Yes
- Catering facilities: On-board catering, E-catering
- Observation facilities: Large windows
- Baggage facilities: Available
- Other facilities: Below the seats

Technical
- Rolling stock: LHB coach
- Track gauge: 1,676 mm (5 ft 6 in)
- Operating speed: 57 km/h (35 mph) average including halts.

The 12351 / 12352 Howrah-Lalkuan Superfast Express is an express train of the Indian Railways connecting Howrah Junction in West Bengal and Lalkuan Junction of Uttarakhand. It is currently being operated with 12353/12354 train numbers on a weekly basis.

== Service ==
The 12353/Howrah - Lal Kuan Weekly SF Express has an average speed of 55 km/h and covers 1348 km in 24 hrs 25 mins. The 12354/Lal Kuan - Howrah Weekly SF Express has an average speed of 55 km/h and covers 1348 km in 24 hrs 25 mins.

== Route and halts ==
The important halts of the train are:

- Howrah Junction
- Barddhaman Junction
- Asansol Junction
- Dhanbad Junction
- Gaya Junction
- Dehri-on-Sone
- Sasaram Junction
- Pt. Deen Dayal Upadhyaya Jn.
- Varanasi Junction
- Pratapgarh Junction
- Rae Bareli Junction
- Lucknow Charbagh
- Bareilly Junction
- Bareilly City
- Izzatnagar
- Lalkuan Junction

== Coach composite ==
Earlier was ICF coaches. now The train has standard LHB rakes with max speed of 130 kmph. The train consists of 16 coaches :

- 2 AC II Tier
- 3 AC III Tier
- 8 Sleeper Coaches
- 2 General
- 2 Second-class Luggage/parcel van

== Traction ==
earlier was used to run with WDP-4. Both trains are hauled by a Howrah Loco Shed-based WAP-7 or WAP-4 electric locomotive from end to end.

== Rake sharing ==
The train shares its rake with 13025/13026 Howrah - Bhopal Express

== See also ==
- Lalkuan Junction railway station
- Howrah Junction railway station
- Howrah - Bhopal Express
