= Haridwar–Ramnagar Intercity Express =

Train in India

Haridwar – Ramnagar Intercity Express

Overview
- Service type: Express
- First service: 17 March 2012; 14 years ago
- Current operator: North Eastern Railway zone

Route
- Termini: Haridwar; Ramnagar
- Stops: 5
- Distance travelled: 245 km (152 mi)
- Average journey time: 5 hours 10 mins
- Service frequency: Triweekly
- Train number: 15033 / 15034

On-board services
- Classes: AC Chair car, general unreserved, Chair car
- Seating arrangements: Yes
- Sleeping arrangements: No
- Catering facilities: No

Technical
- Rolling stock: Standard Indian Railways Coaches
- Track gauge: 1,676 mm (5 ft 6 in)
- Operating speed: 47.5 km/h (30 mph)

The 15033 / 34 Haridwar – Ramnagar Intercity Express is an Express train belonging to Indian Railways North Eastern Railway zone that runs between Haridwar and Ramnagar in India.

It operates as train number 15033 from Haridwar to Ramnagar and as train number 15034 in the reverse direction serving the states of Uttrakhand & Uttar Pradesh.

== Coaches ==
The 15033 / 34 Haridwar – Ramnagar Intercity Express has two AC Chair Car, ten Non AC chair car, six general unreserved & two SLR (seating with luggage rake) coaches . It does not carry a pantry car coach.

As is customary with most train services in India, coach composition may be amended at the discretion of Indian Railways depending on demand.

== Service ==
The 15033 Haridwar – Ramnagar Intercity Express covers the distance of 245 km (152 mi) in 5 hours 05 mins (48 km/h) and in 5 hours 15 mins as the 15034 Ramnagar – Haridwar Intercity Express (47 km/h).

As the average speed of the train is less than 55 km/h (34 mph), as per railway rules, its fare doesn't includes a Superfast surcharge.

== Routing ==
The 15033 / 34 Haridwar – Ramnagar Intercity Express runs from Haridwar via Laksar Junction, Najibabad Junction, Moradabad Junction, Kashipur Junction to Ramnagar.

== Traction ==
As the route is going to be electrified, a Izzatnagar based WDM-3A diesel locomotive pulls the train to its destination.
