= C.B. Ganj =

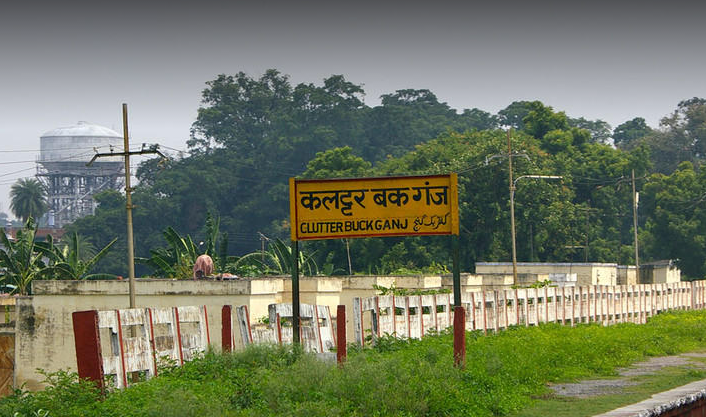
C.B. Ganj Railway Station

C.B. Ganj is a locality in the city of Bareilly in Uttar Pradesh state, India. It is a part of Bareilly Division. C.B. Ganj is an acronym of Clutter Buck Ganj and the area is named after Lt Col Peter Clutterbuck, a British administrator and forest conservator.

The vernacular language is Hindi.

== History ==
C.B. Ganj came into existence when a "Utilization Circle" was established in 1918 at Maheshpur Utaria near Bareilly, United Provinces. It was established by the Chief Conservator of forests, Sir Peter Clutterbuck, and the area was later named Clutterbuckgunj after him. A number of industries such as the Indian Turpentine & Rosin (founded in 1926) and the Western Indian Match Company (WIMCO; founded in 1937) were established here in later years, which resulted in C.B. Ganj becoming a major industrial centre of the city. After the independence of India in 1947, an industrial estate was established in CB Ganj by the UP State Industrial Development Corporation (UPSIDC) in 1958. However, the Indian Turpentine & Rosin Factory ceased production in April 1998 and the WIMCO factory, which used to supply matches across the country, was shut down in 2014.

== Reaching C.B. Ganj ==
The Clutterbuckganj railway station and the Izzatnagar railway station are nearby railway station to C.B. Ganj. However, Bareilly Junction railway station is a major railway station 8 km near to C.B. Ganj. The nearest hotel is radhika palace and hotel

== Pincodes ==
243502 (C.B. Ganj), 243005 (Shahamat Ganj), 243003 (Surkha)

== Colleges ==
- C B Ganj Inter College
- Shiv Gyan Inter College
- Govt. Polytechnic C.B. Ganj Bareilly
- Government Girls Polytechnic C.B.Ganj Bareilly
- Shiv Gyan Degree College Mang. And Technology Khadaua C.B.Ganj Bareilly
- Khushro Memorial Degree College Sanaiya Rani C.B. Ganj Bareilly
- Bal Gyan Peth School
- Govt.ITI C.B. Ganj Bareilly
- DOLPHIN PUBLIC SCHOOL, Khalilpur Road, C.B.Ganj, Bareilly-243502 UP

Mob. 94112-85571

  1. Gautam Chemistry Class house number 241, camphor estate colony c.b.ganj Bareilly 243502

Mobile number +918077715380
