= Baker Nagar Sundrasi =

Village in Uttar Pradesh, India

Baker Nagar Sundrasi, or simply Sundrasi, is a village near C.B. Ganj in the Bareilly district of Uttar Pradesh, India.
