= SKW =

SKW may refer to:

== Transportation ==
=== Airlines ===
- SkyWest Airlines (US Airline)
- Skwentna Airport (IATA: SKW), Alaska, U.S.

=== Rail ===
- Shau Kei Wan station (station code SKW), Hong Kong
- Stoke Newington railway station (station code SKW), London, U.K.
- Sheikhupur railway station (station code SKW), Uttar Pradesh, India

== Other uses ==
- Military Counterintelligence Service (Poland) (Polish: Służba Kontrwywiadu Wojskowego)
- SK Windhoek, Namibian sports club
- SKW (group), an American girl group formed in 2001
- South Korean won (KRW)
- Shane Warne, an Australian cricketer, whose initials are SKW
