= Ramnagar–Chandigarh Intercity Express =

Express Train of Indian Railway North Eastern Railway zone

Ramnagar - Chandigarh Junction Intercity Express
Overview
- Service type: Express
- First service: 16 February 2015; 11 years ago
- Current operator: North Eastern Railway zone

Route
- Termini: Ramnagar; Chandigarh Junction
- Stops: 10
- Distance travelled: 420 km (261 mi)
- Average journey time: 8 hours 05 mins
- Service frequency: Weekly
- Train number: 12527 / 12528

On-board services
- Classes: AC Chair car, general unreserved, Chair car
- Seating arrangements: Yes
- Sleeping arrangements: No
- Catering facilities: No

Technical
- Rolling stock: Standard Indian Railways Coaches
- Track gauge: 1,676 mm (5 ft 6 in)
- Operating speed: 51 km/h (32 mph)

The 12527 / 28 Ramnagar - Chandigarh Junction Intercity Express is an express train belonging to Indian Railways North Eastern Railway zone that runs between Ramnagar and Chandigarh Junction in India.

It operates as train number 12527 from Ramnagar to Chandigarh Junction and as train number 12528 in the reverse direction serving the states of Uttrakhand, Uttar Pradesh, Haryana & Chandigarh.

== Coaches ==
The 12527 / 28 Ramnagar - Chandigarh Junction Intercity Express has one AC Chair Car, five Non AC chair car, two general unreserved & two SLR (seating with luggage rake) coaches . It does not carry a pantry car coach.

As is customary with most train services in India, coach composition may be amended at the discretion of Indian Railways depending on demand.

== Service ==
The 12527 Ramnagar - Chandigarh Junction Intercity Express covers the distance of 420 km (261 mi) in 7 hours 55 mins (50 km/h) and in 7 hours 35 mins as the 12528 Chandigarh Junction - Ramnagar Intercity Express (52 km/h).

As the average speed of the train is less than 55 km/h (34 mph), as per railway rules, its fare doesn't includes a Superfast surcharge.

== Routing ==
The 12527 / 28 Ramnagar - Chandigarh Junction Intercity Express runs from Ramnagar via Kashipur Junction, Moradabad Junction, Laksar Junction, Saharanpur Junction, Ambala Cantonment Junction to Chandigarh Junction.

== Traction ==
As the route is going to be electrified, a Izzatnagar based WDM-3A diesel locomotive pulls the train to its destination.
