= KHH =

KHH may refer to:

- Kaohsiung International Airport, Siaogang District, Taiwan, IATA code KHH
- Kichha railway station, Uttarakhand, India, Indian Railways station code KHH
- Keuw language, in New Guinea, ISO 639-3 language code khh
