= Lalkuan–Amritsar Superfast Express =

Train in India

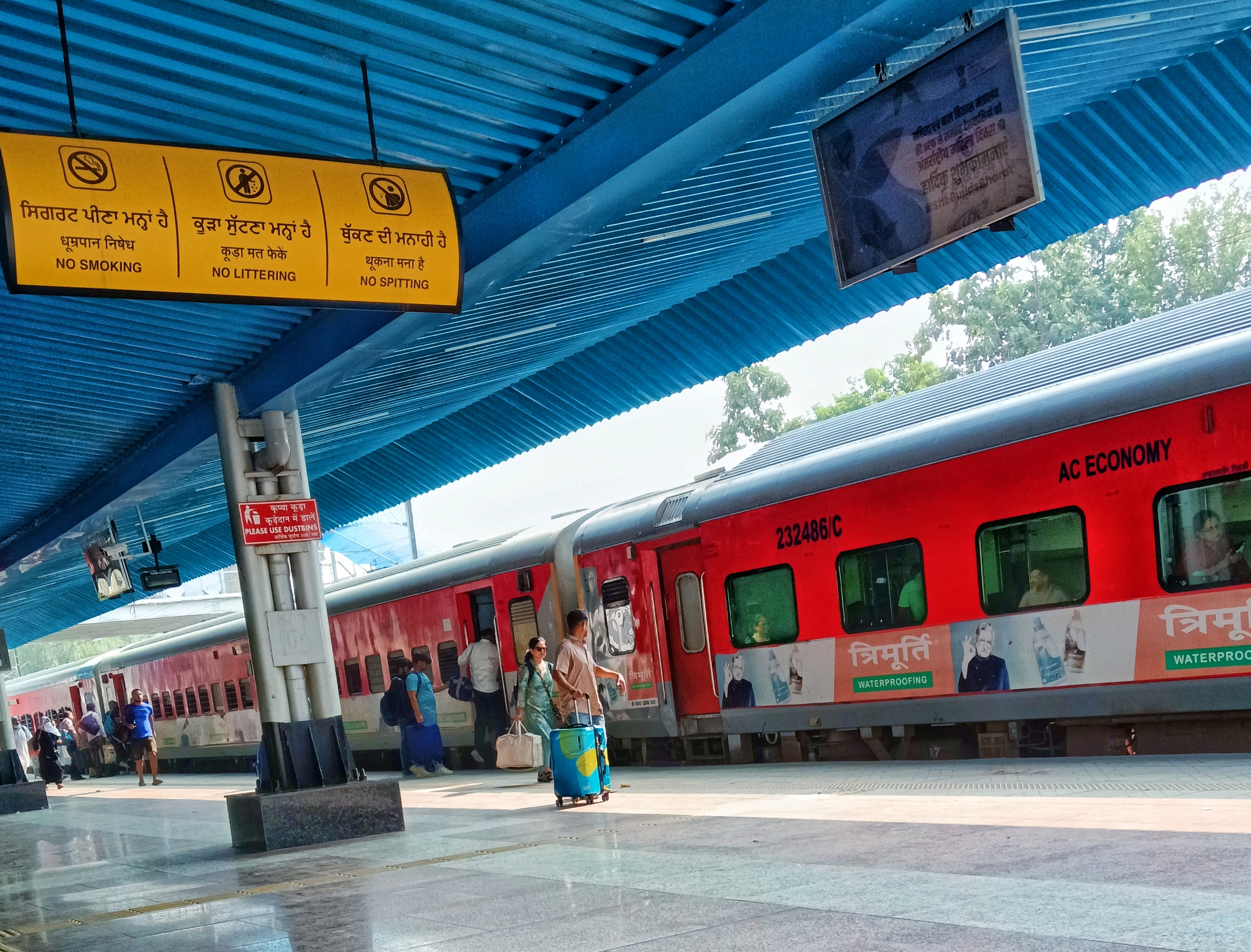
- Lalkuan–Amritsar Express At SAS Nagar Mohali

Overview
- Service type: Superfast
- Locale: Uttarakhand, Uttar Pradesh, Haryana & Punjab
- First service: 15 August 2015; 10 years ago
- Current operator: Northern Railway

Route
- Termini: Lalkuan Junction (LKU); Amritsar Junction (ASR)
- Stops: 16
- Distance travelled: 675 km (419 mi)
- Average journey time: 15 hours 15 minutes
- Service frequency: Weekly (Note: Runs one day in a week for every direction.)
- Train number: 14615 / 14616

On-board services
- Classes: AC 2 Tier, AC 3 Tier, Sleeper Class, General Unreserved
- Seating arrangements: No
- Sleeping arrangements: Yes
- Catering facilities: On-board catering, E-catering
- Observation facilities: Large windows
- Baggage facilities: Available
- Other facilities: Below the seats

Technical
- Rolling stock: LHB coach
- Track gauge: 1,676 mm (5 ft 6 in)
- Operating speed: 44 km/h (27 mph) average including halts.

The 14615 / 14616 Lalkuan-Amritsar Superfast Express is an Express train belonging to Northern Railway zone that runs between Lalkuan Junction and Amritsar Junction in India. It is currently being operated with 14615/14616 train numbers on a weekly basis.

== Service ==
The 14615/Lalkuan–Amritsar Express has an average speed of 59 km/h and covers 675 km in 16h. The 14616/Amritsar–Lalkuan Express has an average speed of 59 km/h and covers 675 km in 15h.

14615-Maximum permissible speed from Lalkuan Junction to Ambala Cantonment Junction is 130 km/h and from Ambala Cantonment Junction to Amritsar Junction its speed ranges between 110 and 120 km/h depending upon track conditions.

14616-From Amritsar Junction to Ambala Cantonment Junction Its speed ranges between 110 and 120 depends on track conditions. And from Ambala Cantonment Junction to Lalkuan Junction its speed is 130 km/h.

== Route and halts ==
The halts of the train are:

- Lalkuan Junction
- Bazpur
- Kashipur Junction
- Moradabad Junction
- Najibabad Junction
- Laksar Junction
- Roorkee
- Saharanpur Junction
- Yamunanagar-Jagadhri
- Ambala Cantonment Junction
- Chandigarh Junction
- SAS Nagar Mohali
- New Morinda
- Ludhiana Junction
- Phagwara Junction
- Jalandhar City Junction
- Beas Junction
- Amritsar Junction

== Coach composition ==
The train has standard LHB rakes with a maximum speed of 130 km/h. The train consists of 18 coaches:

- 1 AC II Tier
- 3 AC III Tier
- 6 Sleeper coaches
- 6 General
- 2 EOGs

== Traction ==
Both trains are hauled by a Ludhiana Loco Shed or Ghaziabad Loco Shed-based WAP-7 electric locomotive from Lalkuan to Amritsar and vice versa.

== Direction reversal ==
The train reverses its direction once:

- Kashipur Junction

== Rake sharing ==
The train shares its rake with 12421/12422 Hazur Sahib Nanded–Amritsar Superfast Express.

== See also ==
- Lalkuan Junction railway station
- Amritsar Junction railway station
- Hazur Sahib Nanded–Amritsar Superfast Express
