= Peter Clutterbuck =

Lieutenant-Colonel Sir Peter Henry Clutterbuck (28 September 1868 – 20 December 1951) was a British colonial civil servant and expert in forestry conservation, who worked as the Inspector General of Forests to the Government of India.

== Early life ==
Clutterbuck was born in Great Stanmore, Middlesex. He was educated at Clifton College and Bloxham School, followed by the Royal Indian Engineering College.

== India ==
He was an officer in the Indian Auxiliary Force between 1887 and 1919. He became a civil servant in the Imperial Forestry Service, and worked in the Central Provinces (1889) and United Provinces (1890). From 1897 he was Deputy-Conservator of Forests, Eastern Circle, Upper Provinces. Awarded Kaisar-i-Hind Medal in 1911, Volunteer Officers' Decoration in 1912. Clutterbuck became Conservator of Forests of Eastern Provinces in 1913 and Upper Provinces in 1915. Commanded 8th Northern United Provinces Horse from 1917 to 1918. He was invested as a Companion of the Order of the Indian Empire in 1918 and as a Commander of the Order of the British Empire in 1919. From 1919 to 1920 he was a Member of Upper Provinces Legislative Council. Clutterbuck was made a knight bachelor in the 1924 Birthday Honours. He was Inspector General of Forests to the Government of India. In 1926 Clutterbuck retired from IFS. From 1927-1932 he remained Chairman of Empire Forestry Association. He was delegate to 1928 Empire Forestry Conference in Australia and New Zealand. From 1933-1944 he served as Chief Conservator of Forests Jammu & Kashmir Forest Department-cum-Development Minister Jammu & Kashmir during Hari Singh's regime.

== Family life ==
On 7 April 1896, he married Winifred Rose, daughter of Alfred Barrow Wilson Marriott. He died in the Bournemouth area on 20 December 1951, aged 83.

His son was Sir Alexander Clutterbuck, a British diplomat who was high commissioner to Canada and India and ambassador to Ireland.

== Tributes ==
The processing of resin from Himalayan pine plantations was initially made in Bhowali and later a factory was set up near Bareilly by Clutterbuck. This area was named as Clutterbuckganj in his honour. It is often abbreviated to C.B. Ganj. It has a railway station.
