= Bijauria =

Village in Bareilly, Uttar Pradesh

- Village
- Location within Uttar Pradesh
- Coordinates: 28.77°N 79.54°E
- Country: India
- State: Uttar Pradesh
- District: Bareilly

Population (Census 2011 India)
  - Total: 1,532

Languages
  - Official: Hindi
- Time zone: UTC+5:30 (IST)
- PIN: 243201
- Nearest city: Baheri
- cold: cold (Köppen)

Bijauria is a village in Baheri block of Bareilly district, in Uttar Pradesh, India. The nearest railway station is Bijauria Junction railway station. Bareilly city is 32 km away from the village. According to Census 2011 India the village population is 1532, out of 823 are males and 709 are females.
