= Hazur Sahib Nanded–Amritsar Superfast Express =

Train in India

Overview
- Service type: Express
- First service: 15 March 2013; 13 years ago
- Current operator: Northern Railway zone

Route
- Termini: Hazur Sahib Nanded (NED); Amritsar Junction (ASR)
- Stops: 22
- Distance travelled: 1,936 km (1,203 mi)
- Average journey time: 35h 5m
- Service frequency: Weekly (Note: Runs one day in a week for every direction.)
- Train number: 12421/12422

On-board services
- Classes: AC 2 tier, AC 3 tier, Sleeper Class, General Unreserved
- Seating arrangements: No
- Sleeping arrangements: Yes
- Catering facilities: On-board catering E-catering
- Observation facilities: LHB coach
- Entertainment facilities: No
- Baggage facilities: No
- Other facilities: Below the seats

Technical
- Rolling stock: 2
- Track gauge: 1,676 mm (5 ft 6 in)
- Operating speed: 55 km/h (34 mph), including halts

The Hazur Sahib Nanded–Amritsar Superfast Express is an express train belonging to Northern Railway zone that runs between Hazur Sahib Nanded and Amritsar Junction in India. It is currently being operated with 12421/12422 train numbers on a weekly basis.

== Service ==
The 12421/Hazur Sahib Nanded–Amritsar SuperFast Express has an average speed of 55 km/h and covers 1936 km in 35h 5m. The 12422/Amritsar–Hazur Sahib Nanded SuperFast Express has an average speed of 58 km/h and covers 1936 km in 33h 15m .

== Route and halts ==
The important halts of the train are:

- Hazur Sahib Nanded
- Purna Junction
- Akola Junction
- Khandwa Junction
- Itarsi Junction
- Bhopal Junction
- Bina Junction
- Jhansi Junction
- Gwalior Junction
- Agra Cantonment
- New Delhi
- Rohtak Junction
- Narwana junction
- Sangrur
- Ludhiana Junction
- Phagwara Junction
- Jalandhar City Junction
- Beas Junction
- Amritsar Junction

== Coach composition ==
The train has standard ICF rakes with a maximum speed of 110 km/h. The train consists of 18 coaches:

- 1 AC II Tier
- 2 AC III Tier
- 7 Sleeper coaches
- 6 General
- 2 Seating cum Luggage Rake

== Traction ==
Both trains are hauled by a Itarsi Loco Shed based WAP-4 electric locomotive from Nanded to Amritsar and vice versa.

== Direction reversal ==
The train reverses its direction once:

- Purna Junction

== Rake sharing ==
The train shares its rake with 14615/14616 Lalkuan–Amritsar Express.

== See also ==
- Hazur Sahib Nanded railway station
- Amritsar Junction railway station
- Lalkuan–Amritsar Express
