= Lalkuan–Anand Vihar Terminal Intercity Express =

Train in India

Lalkuan-Anand Vihar Terminal Intercity Express
Overview
- Service type: Intercity Express
- First service: 13 August 2016; 8 years ago
- Current operator(s): North Eastern Railway

Route
- Termini: Lalkuan Junction (LKU); Anand Vihar Terminal (ANVT)
- Stops: 10
- Distance travelled: 262 km (163 mi)
- Average journey time: 6 hours 15 minutes
- Service frequency: Bi-weekly
- Train number(s): 15059 / 15060

On-board services
- Class(es): AC Chair car, General Unreserved, Chair car, Sleeper
- Seating arrangements: Yes
- Sleeping arrangements: No
- Auto-rack arrangements: Overhead racks
- Catering facilities: On-board catering, E-catering
- Observation facilities: Large windows
- Baggage facilities: No
- Other facilities: Below the seats

Technical
- Rolling stock: ICF coach
- Track gauge: 1,676 mm (5 ft 6 in)
- Operating speed: 42 km/h (26 mph) average including halts.

The 15059 / 15060 Lalkuan–Anand Vihar Terminal Intercity Express is an Intercity Express train belonging to Indian Railways North Eastern Railway zone that runs between Lalkuan Junction and Anand Vihar Terminal in India.

It operates as train number 15059 from Lalkuan Junction to Anand Vihar Terminal and as train number 15060 in the reverse direction serving the states of Uttrakhand, Uttar Pradesh and Delhi.

== Coaches ==
The 15059 / 60 Lalkuan Junction – Anand Vihar Terminal Intercity Express has one AC Chair Car, six Non AC chair car, five general unreserved and two SLR (seating with luggage rake) coaches . It does not carry a pantry car coach.

As is customary with most train services in India, coach composition may be amended at the discretion of Indian Railways depending on demand.

== Service ==
The 15059 Lalkuan Junction – Anand Vihar Terminal Intercity Express covers the distance of 262 km (163 mi) in 6 hours 30 mins (40 km/h) and in 6 hours 50 mins as the 15060 Anand Vihar Terminal – Lalkuan Junction Intercity Express (38 km/h).

As the average speed of the train is less than 55 km/h (34 mph), as per railway rules, its fare doesn't include a Superfast surcharge.

== Routing ==
The 15059 / 60 Lalkuan Junction – Anand Vihar Terminal Intercity Express runs from Lalkuan Junction via Kashipur Junction, Moradabad Junction, Hapur Junction, Ghaziabad Junction to Anand Vihar Terminal.

== Traction ==
As the route is fully electrified, a Izzatnagar Loco Shed based WAP-4 electric locomotive pulls the train to its destination.
