= Bajpur railway station =

Railway station in Uttarakhand, India

Bajpur Railway Station
- Indian Railways logo

General information
- Location: Bajpur, Uttarakhand; India
- Coordinates: 29.1579°N 79.1465°E
- Elevation: 231 metres (758 ft)
- System: Indian Railways station
- Owner: Indian Railways
- Operator: Izzatnagar railway division
- Platforms: 2
- Tracks: Single diesel broad gauge
- Connections: Auto stand

Construction
- Structure type: At grade
- Parking: No
- Cycle facilities: No

Other information
- Status: Functioning
- Station code: BPZ
- Zone(s): Northern Eastern Railway
- Division(s): Izzatnagar
- Fare zone: North Eastern Railway

History
- Electrified: Under construction
Location

Bajpur Railway Station is a small railway station in Udham Singh Nagar district, Uttarakhand. Its code is BPZ. It serves Bajpur city. The station consists of 2 platforms. The platform is not well sheltered. It lacks many facilities including water and sanitation.

== Major trains ==
- Kashipur–Lalkuan Passenger (unreserved)
- Lalkuan–Amritsar Express
- Moradabad–Kathgodam Passenger (via Kashipur) (unreserved)
