= Bijauria Junction railway station =

Railway Station in Uttar Pradesh

Bijauria railway station

General information
- Location: Bareilly, Uttar Pradesh; India
- Coordinates: 28.3562°N 79.4033°E
- Elevation: 172 metres (564 ft)
- System: Indian Railways station
- Owner: Indian Railways
- Operator: North Eastern Railway
- Platforms: 3
- Tracks: 5
- Connections: Auto stand

Construction
- Structure type: Standard (on ground station)
- Parking: Yes
- Cycle facilities: No

Other information
- Status: Single diesel line
- Station code: BJV
- Zone(s): North Eastern Railway
- Division(s): Izzatnagar

Services
Location
- Location within India Location within Uttar Pradesh

Bijauria railway station is a small railway station in Izzatnagar railway division. Its code is BJV. It serves Bijauria and nearby villages in Bareilly district. The station consists of three platforms.

== Passing trains ==
- Pilibhit–Bareilly City Passenger (55362)
- Bareilly City–Pilibhit Passenger (55361)
- Pilibhit–Bareilly City Passenger (55364)
- Bareilly City–Pilibhit BG Passenger (55363)
- Tanakpur–Delhi Express (14555)
- Delhi–Tanakpur Express (14556)
- Pilibhit–Bareilly City Passenger (55366)
- Bareilly City–Pilibhit Passenger (55365)
- Pilibhit–Bareilly City Passenger (55368)
- Bareilly City–Pilibhit DEMU (75305)
- Pilibhit–Bareilly City DEMU (75306)
- Bareilly City–Pilibhit Passenger (55369)
