= Aishbagh =

- Neighbourhood
- Location in India
- Coordinates: 26°50′20″N 80°54′21″E
- Country: India
- State: Uttar Pradesh
- City: Lucknow

Languages
  - Official: Hindi
- Time zone: UTC+5:30 (IST)
- PIN: 226004

Aishbagh (Hindi: ऐशबाग़, Urdu: عیش باغ) is a locality in Lucknow, India. Basically it was an industrial area and there were lot of industries and factories available here namely Milkmade factory, PTC Industries LTD, and many more but in recent years it is also developing as a residential area and a number of residential projects are being run by LDA. There are lot of places for which Aishbagh is famous, mainly Ramleela Ground, Eidgah. One of the biggest kabristan of Lucknow is also found in Aishbagh. One of the roads in Aishbagh called Goods Shed Road has number of plywood factories. The office of Uttar Pradesh State Bridge Corporation is also situated in Aisbagh.

The garden pavilions at Aishbagh were built by Asaf-Ud-Dowlah.

Aishbagh railway station is an important Railway Station of Lucknow that lies in the Aishbagh Area.
