= Bhojipura Junction railway station =

Railway Station in Uttar Pradesh

General information
- Location: India
- Coordinates: 28.4934°N 79.4472°E
- Elevation: 179 metres (587 ft)
- System: Indian Railways station
- Owner: Indian Railways
- Operator: North Eastern Railway
- Platforms: 3
- Tracks: 5
- Connections: Auto stand

Construction
- Structure type: Standard (on ground station)
- Parking: No
- Cycle facilities: No

Other information
- Status: Single electric line
- Station code: BPR
- Zone(s): Northern Eastern Railway
- Division(s): Izzatnagar

History
- Electrified: Yes in 2021

Services
Location
- Location within India Location within Uttar Pradesh

Bhojipura Junction railway station is a railway station in Bareilly district, Uttar Pradesh. Its code is BPR. It serves Bhojipura assembly constituency. The station consists of 3 platforms.

== Trains ==
Train name	Train number	Arrival	Departure	Train origin	Train destination
Lucknow Jn.–Kathgodam Express	153043	05:06	05:08	Lucknow Junction	Kathgodam
Bareilly City–Lal Kuan DEMU	75301	06:32	06:34	Bareilly City	Lalkuan Junction
Bareilly City–Pilibhit Passenger	55361	07:43	07:45	Bareilly City	Pilibhit Junction
Bareilly City–Lal Kuan DEMU	75301	06:32	06:34	Bareilly City	Lalkuan Junction
Pilibhit–Bareilly City Passenger	55362	08:29	08:31	Pilibhit Junction	Bareilly City
Lal Kuan–Bareilly City Passenger	55348	08:50	08:52	Lalkuan Junction	Bareilly City
Pilibhit–Bareilly City Passenger	55364	10:18	10:20	Pilibhit Junction	Bareilly City
Bareilly City–Lal Kuan Passenger	55347	10:44	10:49	Bareilly City	Lalkuan Junction
Lalkuan–Bareilly City Passenger	55352	11:41	11:43	Lalkuan Junction	Bareilly City
Bareilly City–Pilibhit BG Passenger	55363	11:42	11:47	Bareilly City	Pilibhit Junction
Kanpur Central–Kathgodam Garib Rath Express	12209	12:27	12:29	Kanpur Central	Kathgodam
Tanakpur–Delhi Express	14555	12:53	12:55	Tanakpur	Delhi Junction
Bareilly City–Lalkuan Passenger	55351	13:46	13:48	Bareilly City	Lalkuan Junction
Kathgodam–Lucknow Jn. Express	15044	13:48	13:50	Kathgodam	Lucknow Junction
Delhi–Tanakpur Express	14556	14:19	14:21	Delhi Junction	Tanakpur
Bareilly City–Pilibhit Passenger	55365	15:08	15:10	Bareilly City	Pilibhit Junction
Lal Kuan–Bareilly City DEMU	75302	15:10	15:12	Lalkuan Junction	Bareilly City
Pilibhit–Bareilly City Passenger	55366	15:59	16:01	Pilibhit Junction	Bareilly City
Bareilly City–Lal Kuan Passenger	55349	17:58	18:00	Bareilly City	Lalkuan Junction
Bareilly City–Pilibhit DEMU	75305	18:40	18:42	Bareilly City	Pilibhit Junction
Lal Kuan–Bareilly City Passenger	55336	18:42	18:44	Lalkuan Junction	Bareilly City
Pilibhit–Bareilly City Passenger	55368	19:26	19:28	Pilibhit Junction	Bareilly City
Kanpur Central–Kathgodam Garib Rath Express	12210	21:19	21:21	Kathgodam	Kanpur Central
