= Sheikhupur =

- Village
- Location in Punjab, India Sheikhupur (India)
- Coordinates: 31.355130°N 75.361404°E
- Country: India
- State: Punjab
- District: Kapurthala
- Time zone: UTC+5:30 (IST)
- PIN: 144620
- Telephone code: 1822
- Vehicle registration: PB-09

Sheikhupur is a village in Kapurthala. Kapurthala is a district of Punjab in India. ਪੁਰਾਤਨ ਮਾਤਾ ਭੱਦਰਕਾਲੀ ਮੰਦਰ ਪੁਰਾਤਨ ਸ਼ਿਵ ਮੰਦਰ
