= Puranpur railway station =

Railway station in Uttar Pradesh

General information
- Location: National Highway 730 (India), Puranpur, Pilibhit, Uttar Pradesh; India
- Coordinates: 28.515551°N 80.150382°E
- Elevation: 184 metres (604 ft)
- System: Indian Railways station
- Owner: Indian Railways
- Operator: North Eastern Railway
- Line: Daliganj-Bareilly-Kasganj Line
- Platforms: 3
- Tracks: 5
- Connections: Auto stand

Construction
- Structure type: At grade
- Parking: Yes
- Cycle facilities: Yes

Other information
- Status: Single Electric line
- Station code: PP
- Zone(s): Northern Eastern Railway
- Division(s): Izzatnagar

History
- Opened: Yes
- Rebuilt: Yes

Services
Location
- Location within India Location within Uttar Pradesh

Puranpur railway station is one of the suburban railway stations in Puranpur City, Pilibhit district, Uttar Pradesh. Its code is PP. It serves Puranpur town. The station consists of 3 Platforms.
