= Baheri railway station =

Railway station in Uttar Pradesh, India

Baheri
- Indian Railways logo

General information
- Location: Baheri, Bareilly, Uttar Pradesh; India
- Coordinates: 28.778122°N 79.500599°E
- Elevation: 195 metres (640 ft)
- System: Indian Railways station
- Owner: Indian Railways
- Operator: North Eastern Railway
- Platforms: 2
- Tracks: 3

Construction
- Structure type: At grade
- Parking: Yes
- Cycle facilities: No

Other information
- Status: Single diesel line
- Station code: BHI
- Zone(s): Northern Eastern Railway
- Division(s): Izzatnagar
Location
- Location within India Location within Uttar Pradesh

Baheri railway station is a railway station in Bareilly district, Uttar Pradesh. Its code is BHI. It serves Baheri city. The station consists of two platforms. Passenger and Express trains halt here. All passenger and express trains halt here. It is biggest station between Bareilly and Lalkuan.

== Trains ==
The following trains halt at Baheri railway station in both directions:

- Lucknow Junction–Kathgodam Express
- Kanpur Central–Kathgodam Garib Rath Express
