= Lakhimpur railway station =

Railway station in Uttar Pradesh, India

General information
- Location: Sankata Devi MANDIR- LRP chowk road, Near Heera Lal Dharamshala Lakhimpur, Uttar Pradesh; India
- Coordinates: 27.9473°N 80.7775°E
- Elevation: 150 metres (490 ft)
- System: train station
- Owner: Indian Railways
- Operator: North Eastern Railway zone
- Lines: Aishbagh-Bareilly Section (Vaya Sitapur, Pilibhit)
- Platforms: 3
- Tracks: 4
- Connections: Auto stand

Construction
- Structure type: At grade
- Parking: Yes
- Cycle facilities: Yes
- Accessible: Yes

Other information
- Status: Functioning
- Station code: LMP
- Fare zone: NER

History
- Opened: 1885; 141 years ago
- Rebuilt: Yes
- Computerized ticketing counters Luggage checking system Parking Disabled access Food plaza Kiosks WC Taxi stand Public transportation
Location
- Location within Uttar Pradesh Location within India

Lakhimpur railway station is the main railway station in Lakhimpur Kheri district, Uttar Pradesh. Its code is LMP. It serves Lakhimpur city. The station has three platforms, all well sheltered. It is a beneficiary of the Amrit Bharat Station Yojna Scheme, which involves the upgrading of facilities such as escalators.

In February 2010, Railway Minister of India Mamata Banerjee declared the gauge conversion in Lucknow–Sitapur–Pilibhit metre-gauge line. the work on the rail line started in May 2016. CRS inspection for this railway line was held on 18 March 2019. On 28 August, the minister of state railway inaugurated the train. Now trains are running from Lucknow to Lakhimpur. There are just two trains right now which are running between Lucknow and Lakhimpur. The Gomti Express which runs from Gorakhpur to Lakhimpur via Lucknow and Sitapur and another train is a passenger running between Lakhimpur–Sitapur and Lucknow, after the Minister of State for Railway inaugurated this Sitapur and Lakhimpur section. Now the next section is Gola–Mailani and then from Mailani to Pilibhit and after this, the complete route will be opened for railways operation.

== Trains ==
- Lucknow Jn - Shahgarh Passenger
- Lal Kuan - Varanasi City Junction Summer Special Express
- Malani Jn - Daliganj Jn Passenger
- Gorakhpur-Mailani Express
- Lal Kuan - Howrah junction Summer Special Express
- Ramnagar - Aishbagh Junction Summer Special Express
- Sitapur Jn - Malani Jn Passenger
