= Kichha railway station =

Rail station in Uttarakhand, India

Kichha
- Indian Railways logo

General information
- Location: Kichha, Udham Singh Nagar district, Uttarakhand; India
- Coordinates: 28.915326°N 79.519742°E
- Elevation: 208 metres (682 ft)
- System: Indian Railways station
- Owner: Indian Railways
- Operator: North Eastern Railway
- Platforms: 2
- Tracks: 2

Construction
- Structure type: At grade
- Parking: No
- Cycle facilities: No

Other information
- Status: Single electric line
- Station code: KHH
- Zone(s): Northern Eastern Railway
- Division(s): Izzatnagar
Location
- Location within India Location within Uttarakhand

Kichha Railway Station is a railway station in Udham Singh Nagar district, Uttarakhand. Its code is KHH. It serves Kichha city. The station consists of two platforms. Passenger and Express trains halt here.

== Trains ==
The following trains halt at Kichha railway station in both directions:

- Lucknow Junction–Kathgodam Express
- Kanpur Central–Kathgodam Garib Rath Express
- Howrah–Lalkuan Express
