= Mailani Junction railway station =

Railway station in Uttar Pradesh, India

Mailani junction

General information
- Location: Mailani, Lakhimpur, Uttar Pradesh; India
- Coordinates: 28.2840°N 80.3482°E
- Elevation: 160 m (520 ft)
- System: Train Station
- Owner: Indian Railways
- Operator: North Eastern Railway
- Lines: Aishbagh-Bareilly Section (Via Sitapur, Pilibhit); Mailani Jn.-Nanpara Jn. MG Section
- Platforms: 3 BG and 4 MG
- Tracks: 7 BG Tracks (4 Terminated) and 9 MG Tracks
- Connections: Auto stand

Construction
- Structure type: Standard (on-ground station)
- Platform levels: High Level BG Platforms
- Parking: Available
- Cycle facilities: Yes

Other information
- Status: Functioning
- Station code: MLN
- Zone(s): North Eastern Railway
- Division(s): Lucknow NER
- Fare zone: North Eastern Railway zone

History
- Opened: 1885; 141 years ago
- Closed: No
- Rebuilt: Yes
- Former names: Mailani
- Computerized ticketing counters Luggage checking system Parking Disabled access Food plaza Kiosks WC Taxi stand Public transportation
Location
- Location within Uttar Pradesh Location within India

Mailani Junction railway station is an important railway station in Lucknow NER Division Of Indian Railways.

This junction is an important station of Aishbagh-Bareilly Section (Vaya Sitapur, Pilibhit) and Mailani Junction-Nanpara Junction MG Section.

Its code is MLN. It serves Mailani. This junction has both BG and MG tracks. The BG station has 3 platforms and 7 tracks out of which 4 tracks are terminated tracks. The MG station has 4 platforms and 9 tracks. The platforms are well sheltered with many facilities, including water and sanitation.

== Trains ==
- Mailani Jn- Bahraich Passenger
- Lucknow-Mailani Unreserved Express
- Mailani-Gorakhpur Gomtinagar Express
- Gorakhpur–Mailani Express
