= Aishbagh railway station =

Railway station in Uttar Pradesh, India

Aishbagh Railway Station
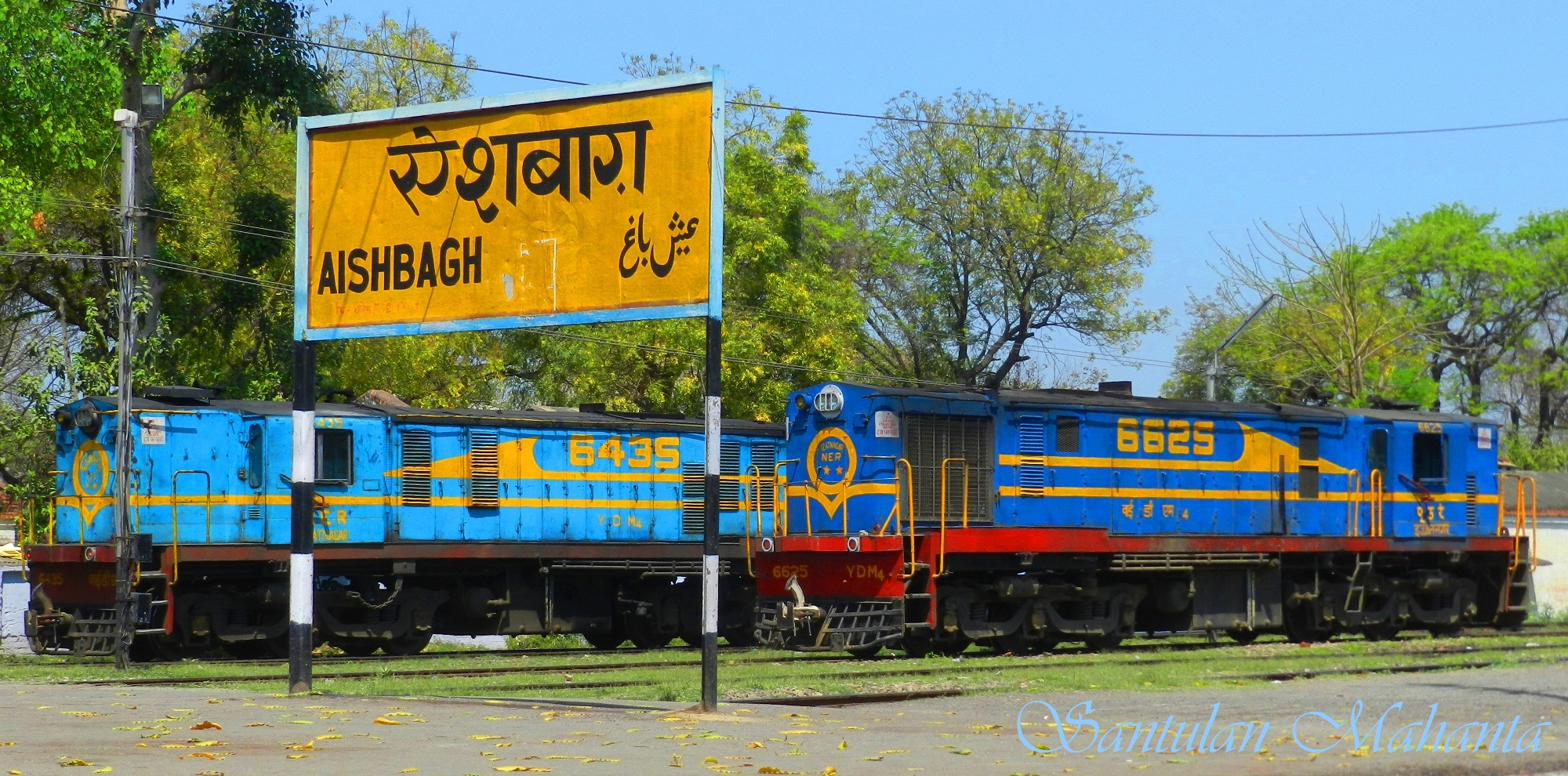
- Two metre gauge YDM4 diesel locomotives rest in Aishbagh station in Lucknow, India

General information
- Location: Aishbagh, Lucknow, Uttar Pradesh 226004; India
- Coordinates: 26°49′55″N 80°55′08″E
- Elevation: 126 metres (413 ft)
- System: Express train and Passenger train station
- Owner: Indian Railways
- Lines: Aishbagh-Bareilly Section (Vaya Sitapur, Pilibhit); Lucknow–Barabanki line via Gomtinagar; Aishbagh-Manaknagar-Kanpur Line
- Platforms: 6
- Tracks: 9

Construction
- Structure type: Standard on-ground station
- Parking: Yes
- Cycle facilities: Available
- Accessible: Disabled access

Other information
- Status: Functioning
- Station code: ASH
- Fare zone: North Eastern Railway zone

History
- Rebuilt: 2016
- Former names: Oudh and Rohilkhand Railway / East Indian Railway Company
Location
- Location within Uttar Pradesh

Aishbagh railway station used to serve the 130 years old metre-gauge railway network, and used to act as a terminal for it. On 15 May 2016 the gauge conversion process started in which the Aishbagh - Sitapur-Lakhimpur - Mailani - Pilibhit section has been completely upgraded to broad gauge as of March 2024 along with Track Electrification.

Before the gauge conversion Aishbagh Junction had five platforms. This was increased to six after Gauge Conversion along with a new entrance from the new platform side. Aishbagh Railway Station has also been provided with a chord line connecting Aishbagh to Manak Nagar; to bypass Lucknow Jn. NER. This chord line is under the process of track doubling. Many trains which used to undergo loco reversal at Lucknow Jn. NER now pass through Aishbagh - Manak Nagar without needing loco reversal thus saving time. 60 trains halt/originate at Aishbagh Jn.

Other than Aishbagh, Alam Nagar, Gomti Nagar, Utrahtia Jn. and Daliganj Jn have been developed as satellite stations to pick the traffic pressure off Charbagh, Lucknow Junction and Badshah Nagar railway stations. Right now Lucknow Charbagh NR, Lucknow Junction NER, Daliganj Junction, Gomti Nagar, Utrahtia Jn. – railway stations are originating/terminating railway stations in Lucknow.

== Lines ==
- Lucknow Jn. -Mailani Jn. - Kasganj Main Line
- Lucknow Jn. - Barabanki Jn. Line
- Aishbagh Jn. –Mailani Jn. (metre-gauge trains withdrawn in 2016)
