= Sitapur City Junction railway station =

Railway station in Uttar Pradesh, India

Sitapur City railway station

General information
- Location: National Highway 24, Sitapur, Uttar Pradesh; India
- Coordinates: 27.5839°N 80.6801°E
- Elevation: 140 metres (460 ft)
- System: Indian Railways station
- Owner: Indian Railways
- Operator: Northern Railway
- Lines: Roza-Burhwal Line, Sitapur City-Balamau-Unnao Line,
- Platforms: 3
- Tracks: 5
- Connections: Auto stand

Construction
- Structure type: Standard (on-ground station)
- Parking: No
- Cycle facilities: No

Other information
- Status: Functioning
- Station code: SPC
- Zone(s): Northern Railway
- Division(s): Moradabad

Services
Location
- Location within India Location within Uttar Pradesh

Sitapur City railway station is a railway station in Sitapur district, Uttar Pradesh, India. Its code is SPC. It serves Sitapur old city. The station consists of three platforms. The platforms are not well sheltered. It lacks many facilities including water and sanitation.
