= Pantnagar railway station =

Indian railway station

Pantnagar Railway Station
- Indian Railways logo

General information
- Location: NH 87, Pantnagar, Uttarakhand; India
- Coordinates: 29.0176°N 79.5180°E
- Elevation: 236 metres (774 ft)
- System: Indian Railways station
- Owner: Indian Railways
- Operator: North Eastern Railway
- Platforms: 1
- Tracks: 4
- Connections: Auto stand

Construction
- Structure type: At grade
- Parking: No
- Cycle facilities: No

Other information
- Status: Functioning
- Station code: PBW
- Zone(s): Northern Eastern Railway
- Division(s): Izzatnagar
Location

Pantnagar Railway Station is a small railway station in Udham Singh Nagar district, Uttarakhand. Its code is PBW. It serves Pantnagar city. The station consists of a single platform. The platform is not well sheltered. It lacks many facilities including water and sanitation.

== Major trains ==
The following trains run from Pantnagar railway station:

- Lal Kuan–Bareilly City Passenger (unreserved)
- Agra Fort–Ramnagar Weekly Express
- Bareilly City–Lalkuan Passenger (unreserved)
- Kathgodam–Lucknow Jn. InterCity Express
