= Izzatnagar railway division =

Railway division of India

Izzatnagar railway division is one of the three railway divisions under the jurisdiction of North Eastern Railway zone of the Indian Railways. It is located in Bareilly is a railway division under North Eastern Railway zone of Indian Railways. This railway division was formed on 14 April 1952.

Varanasi railway division and Lucknow NER railway division are the other two railway divisions under NER Zone headquartered at Gorakhpur.

== List of railway stations and towns ==
The list includes the stations under the Izzatnagar railway division and their station category.

| Category of station | No. of stations | Names of stations |
|---|---|---|
| A-1 | - | Pilibhit Junction Bareilly Junction Lalkuan Junction Kasganj Junction |
| A | - | Kathgodam, Tanakpur,Bhojipura Junction,Izzatnagar, Bareilly City, Farrukhabad Junction, Kashipur Junction, Ramnagar |
| B | - | ,, Puranpur, Haldwani,Pantnagar |
| C suburban station | - | Bajpur, Baheri, Budaun, Fatehgarh, Hathras City, Kalyanpur,Kannauj, Kiccha , Khatima,Kaimganj,Sikandra Rao, Soron, Ujhani,Shahjahanpur |
| D | - | |
| E | - | Araul Makanpur, Darioganj, Roshanpur, Ganj Dundwara, Gursahaiganj, Dudhia Khurd, Ghatpuri, Gularbhoj, Kampil Road, Kamalganj, Kurraiya, Nigohi, Bisalpur, Patiali, Peepalsana, Shamshabad |
| F halt station | 53 | - |
| Total | - | - |

Stations closed for Passengers -
