= Ramnagar railway station =

Railway station in Nainital, Uttarakhand, India

Ramnagar Railway Station
- Indian Railways logo

General information
- Location: National Highway 309, Ramnagar, Nainital; India
- Coordinates: 29.3898°N 79.1220°E
- Elevation: 344 metres (1,129 ft)
- System: Indian Railways station
- Owner: Indian Railways
- Operator: Izzatnagar railway division
- Platforms: 4
- Tracks: 4
- Connections: Auto stand

Construction
- Structure type: At grade
- Parking: Yes
- Cycle facilities: No

Other information
- Status: Functioning
- Station code: RMR
- Zone(s): North Eastern Railway
- Division(s): Izzatnagar
- Fare zone: North Eastern Railway

History
- Electrified: Under progress
Location

Ramnagar railway station is a small railway station in Nainital district, Uttarakhand. Its code is RMR. It serves Ramnagar city. The station consists of four platforms. The nearest airport is Pantnagar Airport at the distance of 55 km.

In 1907, during the British Raj the railway line in Uttarakhand was extended from Moradabad to Ramnagar. Ramnagar railway station is under the administrative control of the Izzatnagar division of the North Eastern Railway zone of the Indian Railways. The station is located about 65 km from Nainital. It has direct rail links to Kashipur, Moradabad, Delhi, Bareilly, Budaun, Lucknow, Haridwar, Chandigarh, Gurgaon, Mumbai, Agra, Jaisalmer and Varanasi.

== Major trains ==
Some important trains that originate or terminate here:

Train no.	Train name	Train type	Arrivals	Arrival time	Departures	Departure time
15035-Slip	Uttarakhand Sampark Kranti Express	Sampark Kranti	Daily	20:45	Daily	9:50
12528	Ramnagar–Chandigarh Intercity Express	Superfast	Mon	23:35	Mon	5:35

- Varanasi–Ramnagar Express
- Haridwar–Ramnagar Intercity Express
- Kashipur–Ramnagar Special
- Corbett Park Link Express
- Moradabad–Ramnagar Fast Passenger
- Moradabad–Ramnagar Passenger
- Kashipur–Ramnagar Passenger
