= Izzatnagar railway station =

Railway station in Uttar Pradesh, India

- Indian Railways logo

General information
- Location: SH 37, Izzatnagar, Bareilly, Uttar Pradesh; India
- Coordinates: 28.3888°N 79.4211°E
- Elevation: 179 metres (587 ft)
- System: Indian railway station
- Owner: Indian Railways
- Operator: North Eastern Railway
- Lines: Aishbagh–Bareilly section (Vaya Sitapur, Pilibhit); Bareilly–Kathgodam section (via Lalkuan); Bareilly–Ramnagar section (via Lalkuan Kashipur); Bareilly–Tanakpur section (via Pilibhit); Bareilly–Mathura section (via Kasganj)
- Platforms: 4
- Tracks: 5
- Connections: Auto stand

Construction
- Structure type: At grade
- Parking: Yes

Other information
- Station code: IZN
- Zone(s): North Eastern Railway
- Division(s): Izzatnagar

History
- Opened: 1875
- Rebuilt: 1952
- Electrified: 2021
Location
- Location within India Location within Uttar Pradesh

Izzatnagar railway station is main railway station in Izzatnagar, Bareilly district, Uttar Pradesh. Its code is IZN. It serves Izzatnagar area in Bareilly city. The station consists of 4 platforms.

Izzatnagar railway division is a part of North Eastern Railway zone of Indian Railways. The Izzatnagar railway station in Bareilly has its roots in the year 1875, when the British planned to connect the hilly regions of Nainital with the plains. The project was led by Alexander Izzat, a British railway officer. In honor of his work, the station was originally named Izzat Railway Station. Over time, locals began pronouncing it as Izzatnagar and the name stuck. Alexander’s son and grandson – Lieutenant Colonel W. R. Izzat and Sir J. R. Izzat – also contributed to the station's development. This railway division was founded on 14 April 1952.

== Trains ==
- 2 Janshatabdi
- 6 Superfast
- 20 Mail /Express
- 12 Passenger trains
- 2 MEMU
- 2 DEMU
- Lucknow Junction–Kathgodam Express
- Daurai–Tanakpur Express
- Shaktinagar Terminal–Tanakpur Express
- Ramnagar–Chandigarh Intercity Express
- Uttarakhand Sampark Kranti Express
- Corbett Park Link Express
- Ranikhet Express
- Haridwar–Ramnagar Intercity Express
- Lalkuan–Anand Vihar Terminal Intercity Express
- Gorakhpur–Mailani Express
- Triveni Express
- Naini Doon Jan Shatabdi Express
- Utsarg Express
- Purnagiri Jan Shatabdi Express

== Loco Shed, Izzatnagar ==
Serial no.	Locomotive class	Horsepower	Quantity
1.	WAP-1	3800	15
2.	WAP-4	5050	45
3.	WAP-7	6350	11
4.	WAG-9	6120	79
5.	WDG-3A	3100	1
6.	WDM-3A	3100	7
7.	WDM-3D	3300	15
8.	WDG-4/4D	4000	14
9.	WDP-4/4D	4500	11
10.	YDM-4	1400	10
11.	WDS-6	1400	2
Total locomotives active as of February 2026			205

== Gallery ==
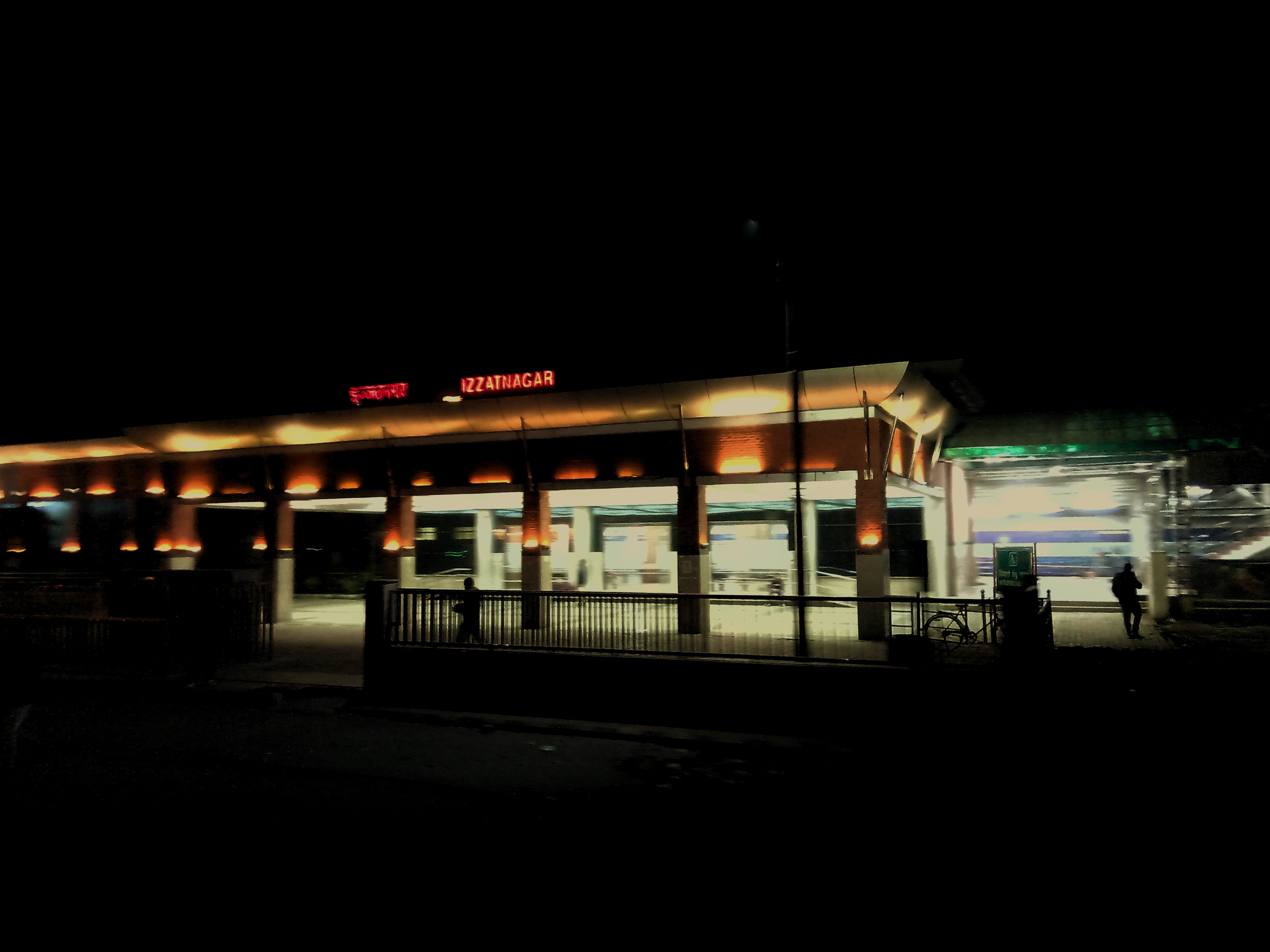
Izzatnagar railway station, Bareilly

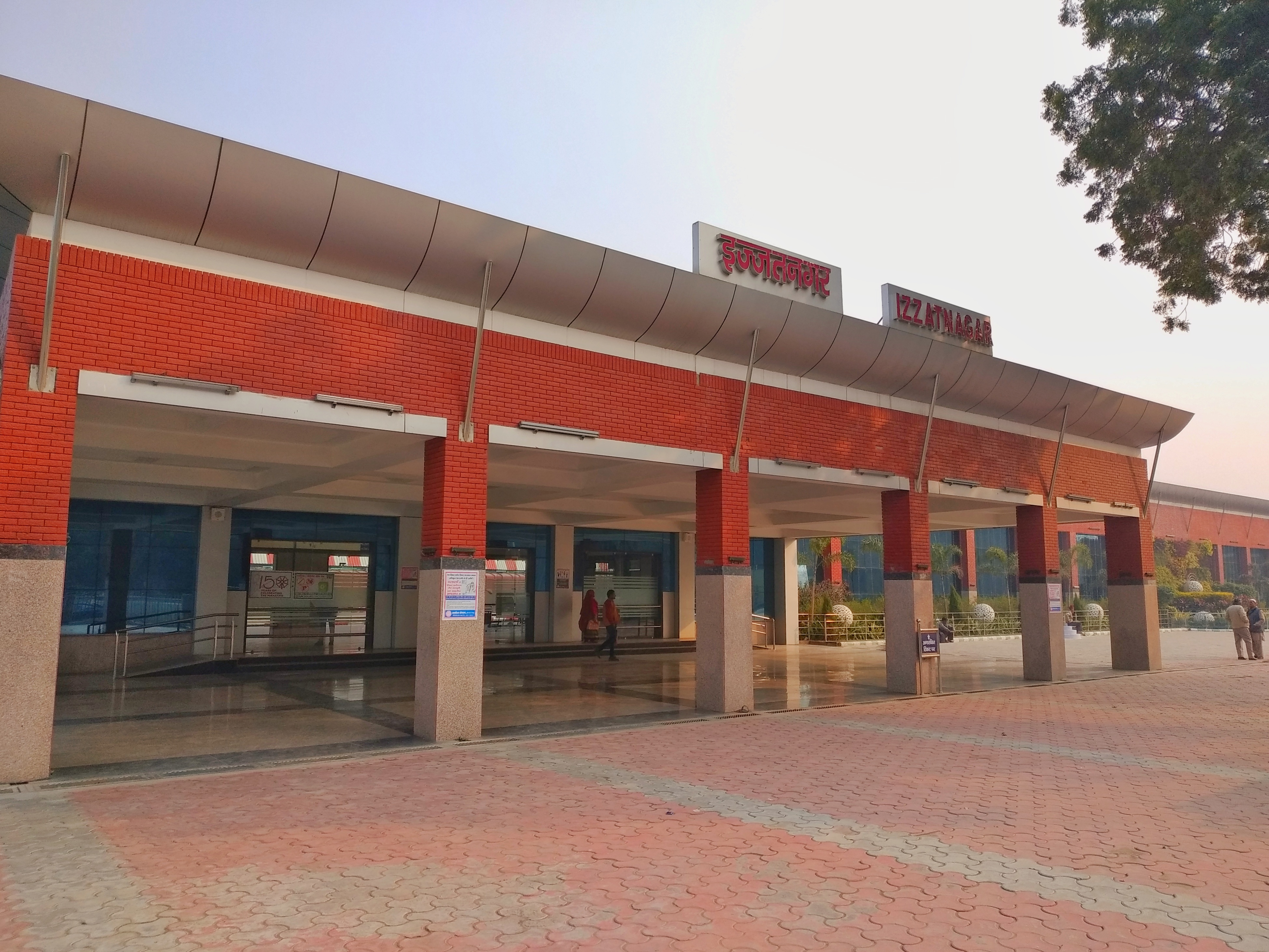
Izzatnagar station in daylight

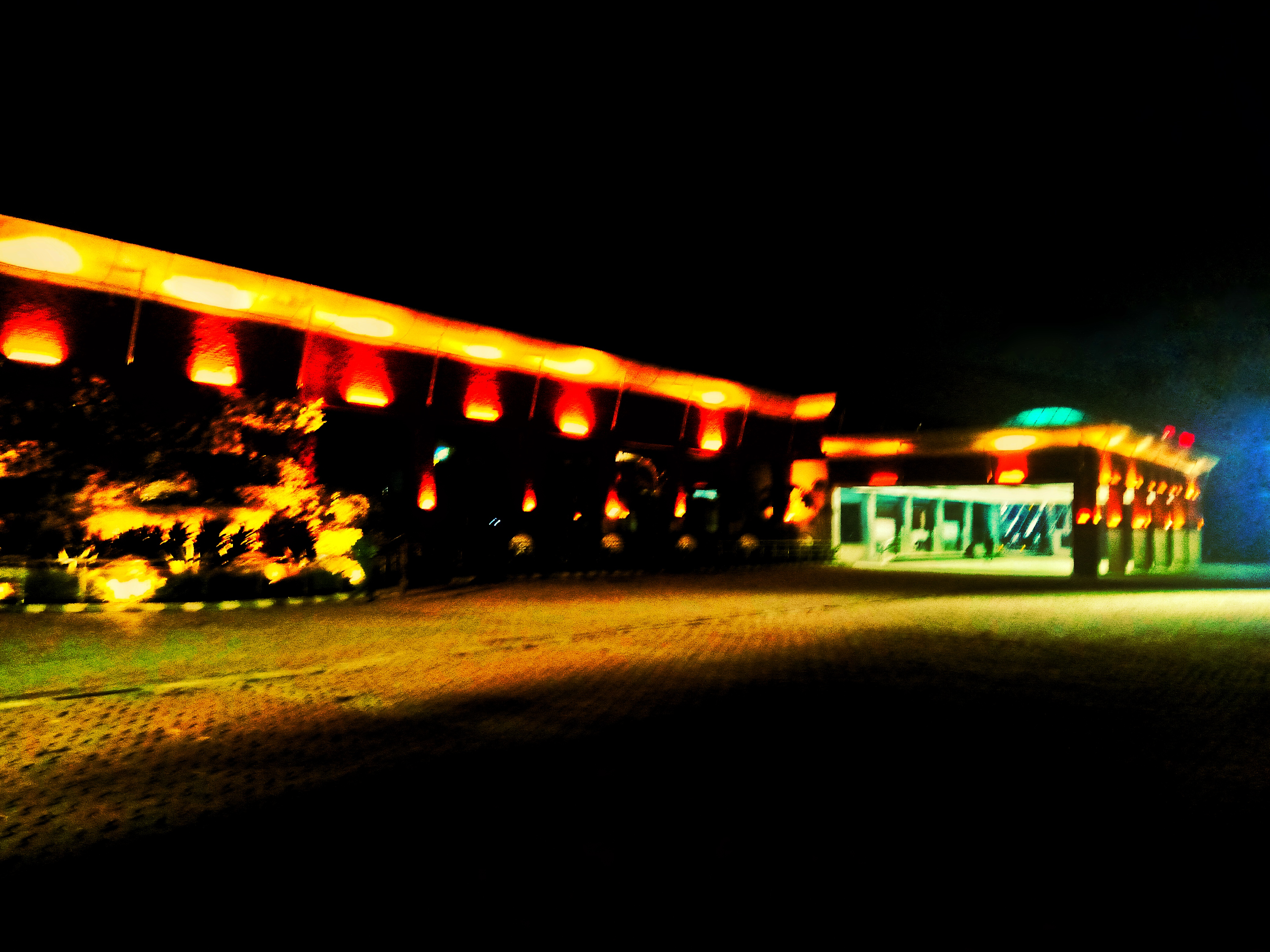
Izzatnagar railway station at night
