= Kashipur Junction railway station =

Railway station in Udham Singh Nagar district, Uttarakhand, India

Kashipur Junction
- Indian Railways logo

General information
- Location: Station Road, Kashipur, Uttarakhand; India
- Coordinates: 29.2052°N 78.9614°E
- Elevation: 237 metres (778 ft)
- System: Indian Railways station
- Owner: Indian Railways
- Operator: North Eastern Railway zone
- Platforms: 3
- Tracks: 4
- Connections: Auto stand

Construction
- Structure type: At grade
- Parking: Yes
- Cycle facilities: Yes

Other information
- Status: Functioning
- Station code: KPV
- Zone(s): Northern Eastern Railway
- Division(s): Izzatnagar
Location
- Location within India Location within Uttarakhand
- Interactive map

Kashipur Junction Railway Station is a small railway station in Udham Singh Nagar district, Uttarakhand. Its code is KPV. It serves Kashipur town. The station consists of three platforms. The platform is well sheltered. The platform is well sheltered. It is beautiful and has good sanitation and water facilities, which many Indian railway stations lack.
