= Pilibhit Junction railway station =

Railway Station in Uttar Pradesh, India

Pilibhit Junction Railways Station
- Pilibhit Junction Railway Station

General information
- Location: Near Maal Godam Rd, Ballabh Nagar Colony, Pilibhit, Uttar Pradesh; India
- Coordinates: 28.6156°N 79.8141°E
- Elevation: 189 metres (620 ft)
- Owner: Indian Railways
- Operator: North Eastern Railway
- Lines: Lucknow-Aishbagh-Sitapur-Mailani-Pilibhit-Bhojipura-Bareilly Line; Pilibhit–Khatima–Tanakpur Line; Pilibhit–Bisalpur–Shahjahanpur Line
- Platforms: 5
- Tracks: 9
- Connections: Auto stand

Construction
- Structure type: At grade
- Parking: Yes
- Cycle facilities: Yes

Other information
- Status: Active
- Station code: PBE
- Zone(s): North Eastern Railway
- Division(s): Izzatnagar

History
- Opened: 1885 Metre Gauge Line And 2016 Broad Gauge Line
- Electrified: Yes 21 Feb 2021

Passengers
- 2024: 23,37,762

Services
Location
- Location within India Location within Uttar Pradesh

Pilibhit Junction is important railway station in Izzatnagar railway division. The station code is PBE. The station consists of 5 platform .It lacks many facilities Including Escalator Coach Indicator System and Basic Amenities Of Passenger.

The length of platform is 900 m (2953 ft) which is 4th longest platform in India. The station is under the administrative control of the North Eastern Railways. Computerized reservation facility is provided.

== Trains ==
Pilibhit Junction railway station is well connected with rest of the country via Bareilly, Tanakpur, Shahjahanpur, and Mailani.
