= Kasganj Junction railway station =

Railway Station in Uttar Pradesh, India

- Indian Railways logo

General information
- Location: State Highway 33, Kasganj, Uttar Pradesh; India
- Coordinates: 27.8016°N 78.6453°E
- Elevation: 174 metres (571 ft)
- System: Indian Railways station
- Owner: Indian Railways
- Operator: North Eastern Railway
- Platforms: 5
- Tracks: 8
- Connections: Auto stand

Construction
- Structure type: At grade
- Parking: Yes
- Cycle facilities: No

Other information
- Status: Single electric line
- Station code: KSJ
- Zone(s): Northern Eastern Railway
- Division(s): Izzatnagar

History
- Opened: 1884
- Electrified: In April 2019
Location
- Location within India Location within Uttar Pradesh

The Rohilkhand and Kumaon Railway started construction of railway line from Bhojipura to Kathgodam under a contract dated 12 October 1882. This was the main line, 53.92 miles in length sanctioned in 1882 and opened on 12 October 1884. Later this line was extended from Bareilly to Soron in 1906.

The railway line Kasganj–Soron section was constructed by the Rajputana and Malwa Railways in 1885 when it was constructing the Kanpur–Achnera section. Later on, when the R&KR constructed the Bareilly–Soron line in 1906 the short section Soron–Kasganj was given over to it. The MG extensions from Moradabad to Kashipur, from Kashipur to Ramnagar and Lalkuan to Kashipur were completed by 1908. Kasganj Junction railway station is a main railway station in Kasganj district, Uttar Pradesh. Its code is KSJ. It serves Kasganj city. The station consists of five platforms. The Bharatpur to Kasganj rail route caters to 16 express and passenger trains.
