= Lucknow–Moradabad main line =

Railway line in Uttar Pradesh, India

Lucknow–Moradabad main line including Chandausi loop
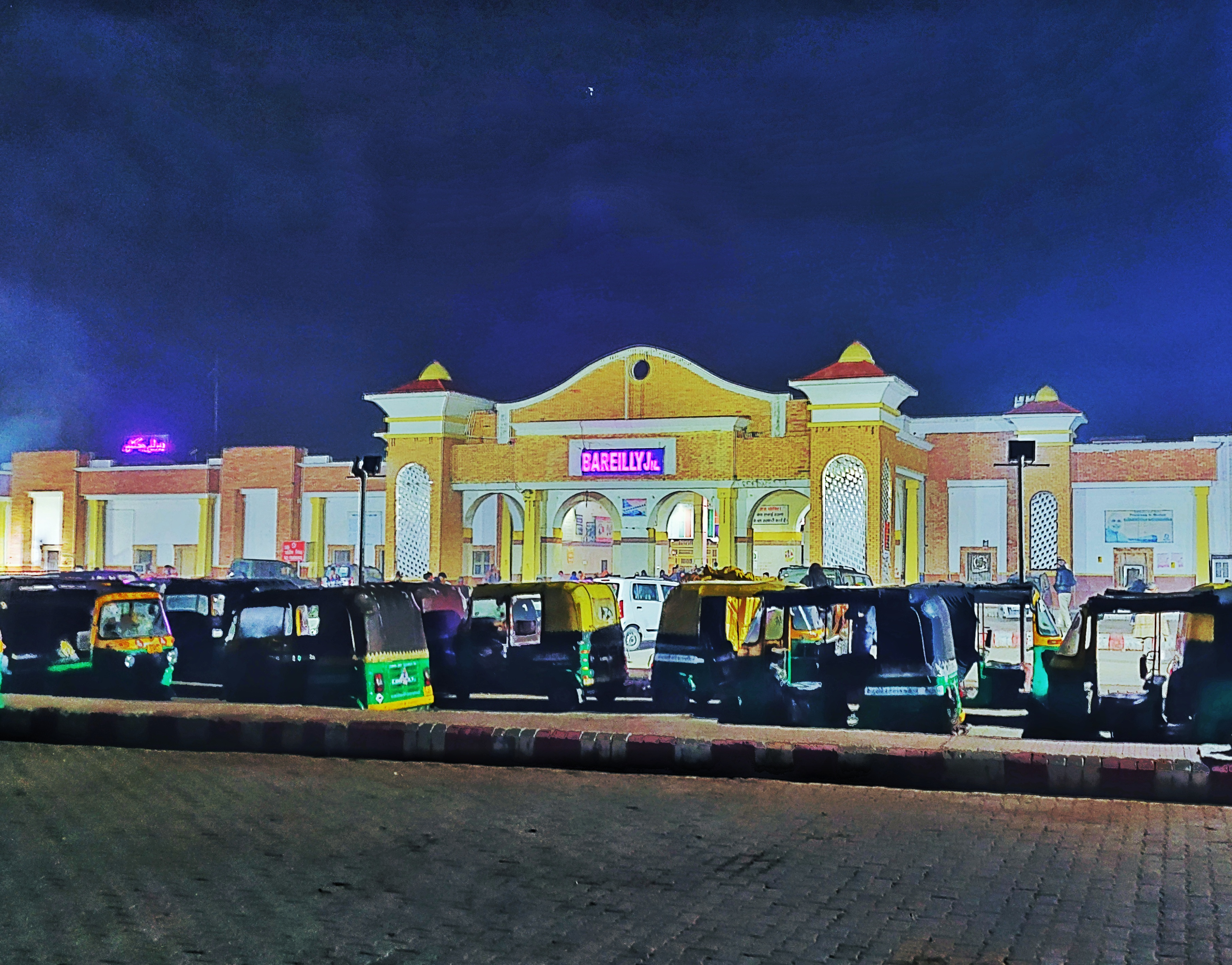
- Bareilly Junction, an important railway station on Lucknow–Moradabad line

Overview
- Status: Operational
- Owner: Indian Railways
- Locale: Gangetic Plain in Uttar Pradesh
- Termini: Lucknow; Moradabad

Service
- Operator: Northern Railway for main line
- Depot: Lucknow Alambagh

History
- Opened: 1873

Technical
- Track length: Mainline: 326 km (203 mi); Chandausi loop: 113 km (70 mi)
- Number of tracks: 2
- Track gauge: 5 ft 6 in (1,676 mm) broad gauge
- Electrification: Yes
- Highest elevation: Lucknow 123 metres (404 ft); Moradabad 201 metres (659 ft)

The Lucknow–Moradabad main line (also known as Lucknow–Moradabad main line) is a railway line connecting Lucknow and Moradabad railway stations, both in the Indian state of Uttar Pradesh. The line is under the administrative jurisdiction of Northern Railway.

== History ==
After connecting Varanasi with Lucknow, the Oudh and Rohilkhand Railway started working west of Lucknow. Construction of railway line from Lucknow to Sandila and then on to Hardoi was completed in 1872. The line up to Bareilly was completed in 1873. A line connecting Moradabad to Chandausi was also built in 1872 and it was continued up to Bareilly in 1873. The Bareilly–Moradabad chord was completed in 1894. The former main line became Chandausi loop and the one via Rampur became main line. A branch line linked Chandausi to Aligarh in 1894.

A short 24 km (15 mi)-long line linked Raja ka Sahaspur to Sambhal Hatim Sarai.

== Electrification ==
The 326 km (203 mi)-long Moradabad–Shahjahanpur–Lucknow line is an electrified double line.

Electrification of the 636 km (395 mi)-long Mughalsarai–Moradabad line was completed in 2013. The survey for railway electrification of the Moradabad–Aligarh line, including the Chandausi–Bareilly sector, was sanctioned in the budget for 2012–13.

== Sheds ==
Lucknow diesel loco shed or Alambagh diesel shed is home to 160+ locomotives, including WDM-2, WDM-3A, WDM-3D, WDG-3A, WDG-4 & WDP-4D varieties. Charbagh locomotive workshops handle periodical overhaul jobs.

== Speed limit ==
Moradabad–Lucknow line is classified as a "Group C" line and can take speeds up to 100 to 110 km / h.

== Passenger movement ==
Lucknow Charbagh, Bareilly and Moradabad on this line, are amongst the top hundred booking stations of Indian Railway.

== Railway reorganisation ==
Around 1872, the Indian Branch Railway Company was transformed into Oudh and Rohilkhand Railway. Oudh and Rohilkhand Railway was merged with East Indian Railway Company in 1925.

The Government of India took over the Bengal and North-Western Railway and merged it with the Rohilkhand and Kumaon Railway to form the Oudh and Tirhut Railway in 1943.

In 1952, Eastern Railway, Northern Railway and North Eastern Railway were formed. Eastern Railway was formed with a portion of East Indian Railway Company, east of Mughalsarai and Bengal Nagpur Railway. Northern Railway was formed with a portion of East Indian Railway Company west of Mughal Sarai, Jodhpur Railway, Bikaner Railway and Eastern Punjab Railway. North Eastern Railway was formed with Oudh and Tirhut Railway, Assam Railway and a portion of Bombay, Baroda and Central India Railway. East Central Railway was created in 1996–97. North Central Railway was formed in 2003.
