= Lalkuan Junction railway station =

Indian railway station

Lalkuan Junction
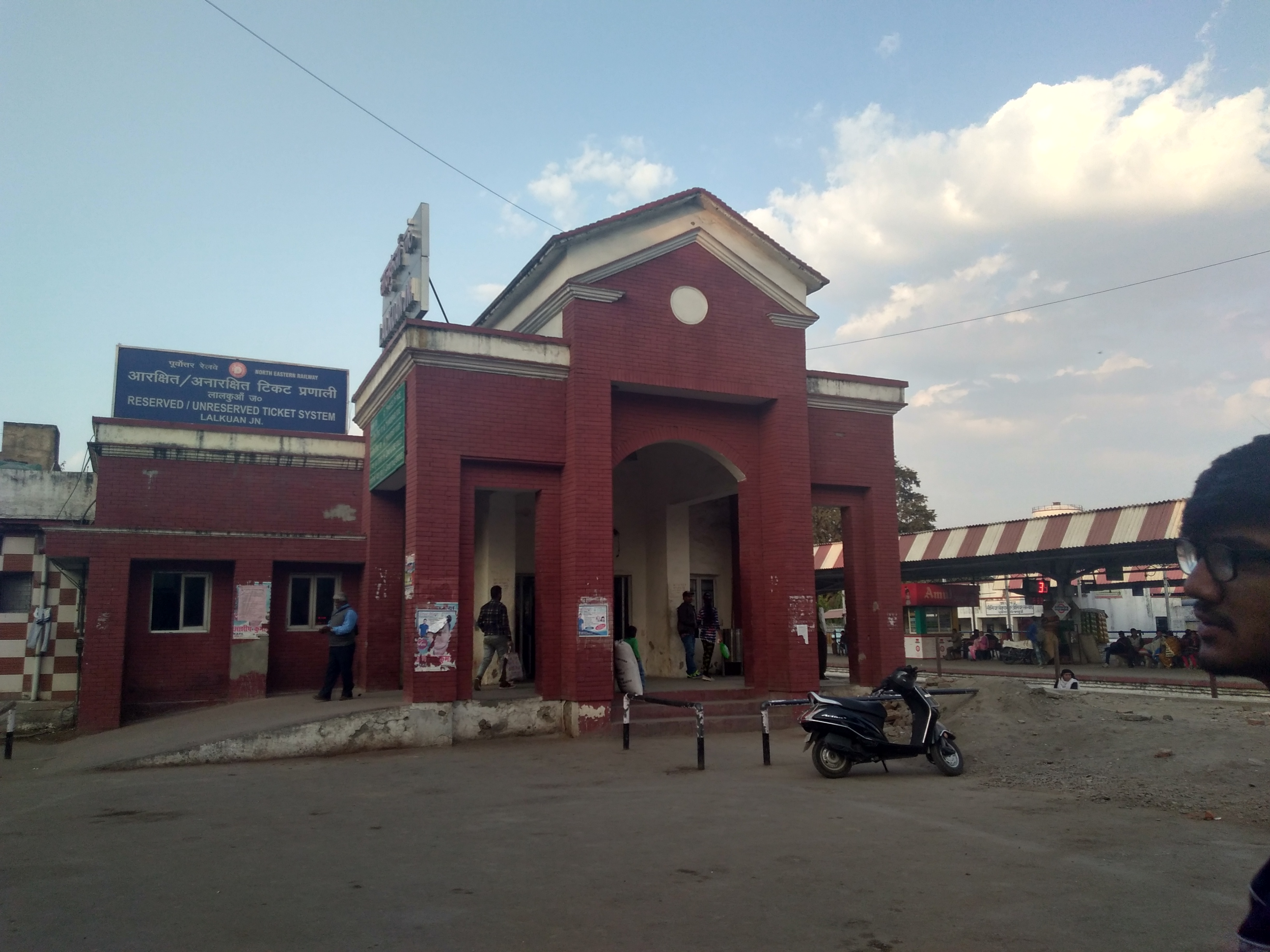
- Main building of the Lalkuan Junction railway station

General information
- Location: NH 87, Lalkuan, Haldwani, Uttarakhand; India
- Coordinates: 29.0712°N 79.5172°E
- Elevation: 443 metres (1,453 ft)
- System: Regional rail and Light rail stations
- Owner: Indian Railways
- Operator: Izzatnagar railway division
- Platforms: 5
- Tracks: 9
- Connections: Auto stand

Construction
- Structure type: At grade
- Parking: No
- Cycle facilities: No

Other information
- Status: Functioning
- Station code: LKU
- Zone(s): North Eastern Railway
- Division(s): Izzatnagar
- Fare zone: North Eastern Railway

History
- Opened: Yes
- Electrified: Yess
Location
- Location within India Location within Uttarakhand

Lalkuan Junction railway station is the main railway station located in Lalkuan in Nainital district, Uttarakhand.

== Background ==
Its code is LKU. It serves Lalkuan city.

== Lines ==
The station was first connected with city of Haridwar through a branch line in 1886, when the Awadh and Rohilakhand Railway line was extended through Roorkee to Saharanpur which was later extended to Dehradun in 1900.
