= Bareilly City railway station =

Medium-size railway station in Uttar Pradesh

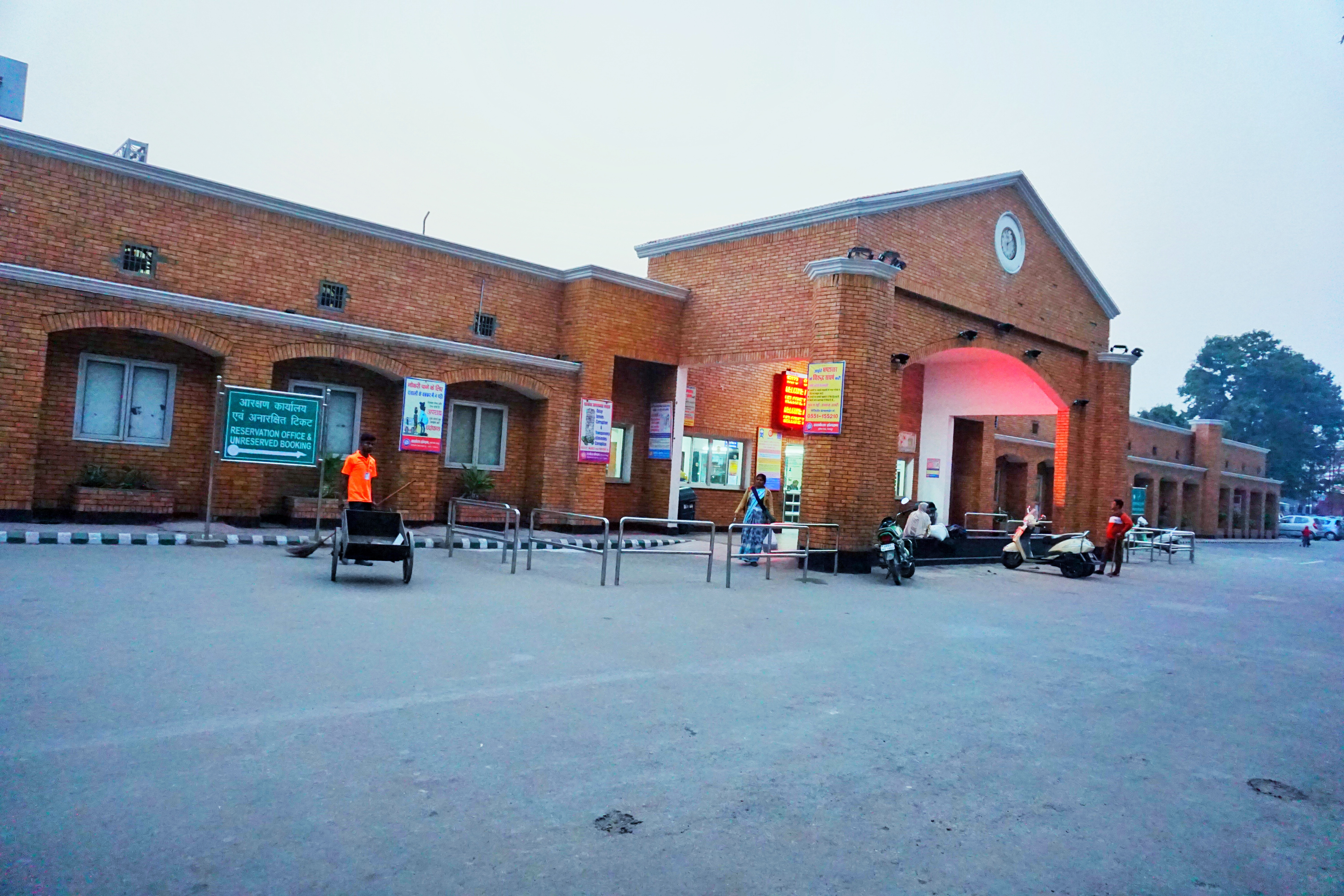
- Bareilly City railway station

General information
- Location: Bareilly, Uttar Pradesh; India
- Coordinates: 28.3562°N 79.4033°E
- Elevation: 172 metres (564 ft)
- System: Indian Railways station
- Owner: Indian Railways
- Operator: North Eastern Railway
- Lines: Aishbagh-Bareilly Section (Vaya Sitapur, Pilibhit)
- Platforms: 4 + 2( Approved)
- Tracks: 7
- Connections: Auto stand

Construction
- Structure type: At grade
- Parking: Yes
- Cycle facilities: No

Other information
- Status: Active
- Station code: BC
- Zone(s): North Eastern Railway
- Division(s): Izzatnagar

History
- Opened: Yes
- Closed: No
- Rebuilt: Yes
Location
- Location within India Location within Uttar Pradesh

Bareilly City railway station is a medium size railway station in Bareilly district, Uttar Pradesh. Its code is BC. It serves Bareilly city. The station consists of four platforms. The platform is well sheltered. It includes facilities including water and sanitation.
