= Bareilly Junction railway station =

Railway station in Uttar Pradesh, India

Bareilly Junction
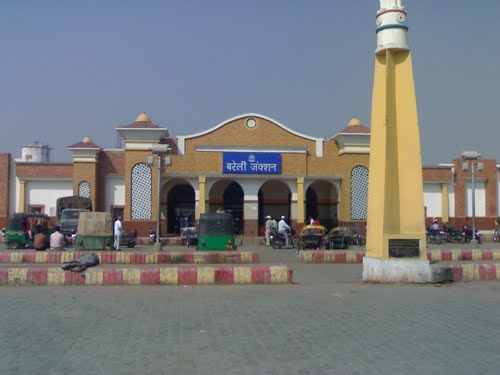
- Main entrance of Bareilly Junction

General information
- Location: Civil Lines, Bareilly, Uttar Pradesh, India
- Coordinates: 28°20′13″N 79°24′39″E
- Elevation: 174 metres (571 ft)
- System: Commuter rail, Regional rail
- Owner: Indian Railways
- Operator: Northern Railways, North Eastern Railways
- Line: Lucknow–Moradabad line
- Platforms: 6 (Proposed 4 More)
- Tracks: 15
- Connections: Central Bus Station, Taxi stand, Auto stand

Construction
- Structure type: At grade
- Parking: Yes
- Cycle facilities: Yes
- Accessible: Available

Other information
- Status: Functioning
- Station code: BE, BRY
- Zone(s): Northern Railway zone, North Eastern Railway zone
- Division(s): Moradabad, Izzatnagar

History
- Opened: 1872; 154 years ago
- Rebuilt: 2007

Passengers
- 2024: 66,27,598
Location
- Location within Uttar Pradesh

Bareilly Junction railway station (station code:- BE, BRY) is a railway station serving Bareilly city in Uttar Pradesh. It is an important station as well as the headquarters of Izzatnagar railway division of the North Eastern Railway zone & Moradabad railway division of the Northern Railway zone. It lies on Lucknow–Moradabad line and Lucknow-Sitapur-Lakhimpur-Pilibhit-Bareilly-Kasganj Line provides a stop for almost all Important and VIP trains passing through that Like Dibrugarh Rajdhani Express , Garib Rath Express , Vande Bharat Express , Jan Shatabdi Express , Shatabdi Express , Humsafar Express , Double Decker Express , Sampark Kranti Express ,Bareilly Junction used to serve both broad and metre gauge, Bareilly Junction was connected to Lucknow by both Broad Gauge and Meter Gauge, Broad Gauge was connected to Lucknow via Tilhar, Shahjahanpur, Hardoi. On the other hand Meter Gauge was connected to Lucknow via Pilibhit-Mailani-Lakhimpur-Sitapur, but now the metre gauge is converted into broad gauge.After Gauge converstion Bareilly Junction provides the better connectivity than Moradabad toward South India and Central India

== History ==
After the British Indian Government purchased the Indian Branch Railway on 31 March 1872, and renamed the Lucknow–Kanpur main line as the Oudh and Rohilkhand Railway, railway services started to expand towards the west of Lucknow. The construction of a railway line from Lucknow to Sandila and then further onwards to Hardoi was completed in 1872. This line was further extended to Bareilly on 1 November 1873. Prior to that, another railway line connecting Moradabad to Chandausi had already been built in 1872; it too was extended to Bareilly, the construction completed on 22 December 1873.

A new railway line connecting Bareilly and Moradabad via Rampur, called the Bareilly–Moradabad Chord, was approved on 4 December 1891, and was completed by 8 June 1894. On 8 December 1894, the main line was officially diverted to this chord, while the older line was renamed the Chandausi loop.

== Connectivity ==
Bareilly railway station is well connected to Lucknow, Delhi, Jammu, Amritsar, Ambala, Jalandhar, Pathankot, Ludhiana, Gorakhpur, Varanasi, Dhanbad, Mau, Ghazipur, Howrah, Guwahati, Patna, Agra, Aligarh, Moradabad, Badaun, Dehradun, Allahabad, Kathgodam, Mumbai,Ahmedabad,Surat,Indore,Bhopal,Bengaluru,Rajkot,Ranchi,Sealdah,kathgodam ,Tanakpur,Ramnagar,Vijayawada,Kanpur,Jhansi ,Gandhidham,Bhuj,Ratlam,Vadodara

=== Electric Bus ===
City Electric buses are also started in the city. Initially 6 buses started on 3 Major routs on 6 Feb, 2022. Now 13 buses out of 25 buses are in operation on 5 routs. Faridpur and Bhojipura are connected with this service.

=== Metro ===
The station is also proposed as an intersection for the planned Bareilly Metro routes and a terminal station for Yellow line.

Line	First operational	Stations	Length (km)	Terminals	
Yellow line	Planned	20	21.54	Bareilly Junction	Bhojipura Central

=== Industry ===
Bareilly is the 50th Major city in India and 8th in Uttar Pradesh. It has many large industries, which are providing jobs in large scale in the city. B.L.Agro Industries Ltd., Raama Shyama Paper Industries, Amar Alum & Allied Chemicals Pvt. Ltd., Amar Narayan Industries Pvt. Ltd. are the major industries of the city. In which Amar Alum & Allied Chemicals Pvt. Ltd. is India's largest Alum Manufacturer.

== Gallery ==
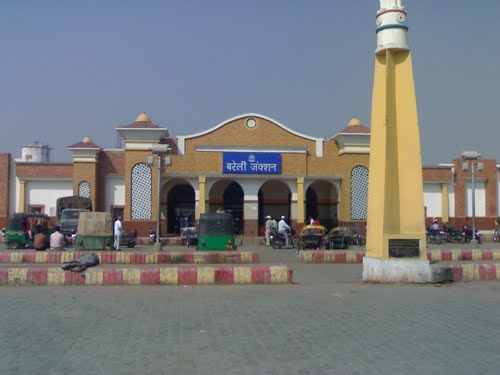
Bareilly Junction front view

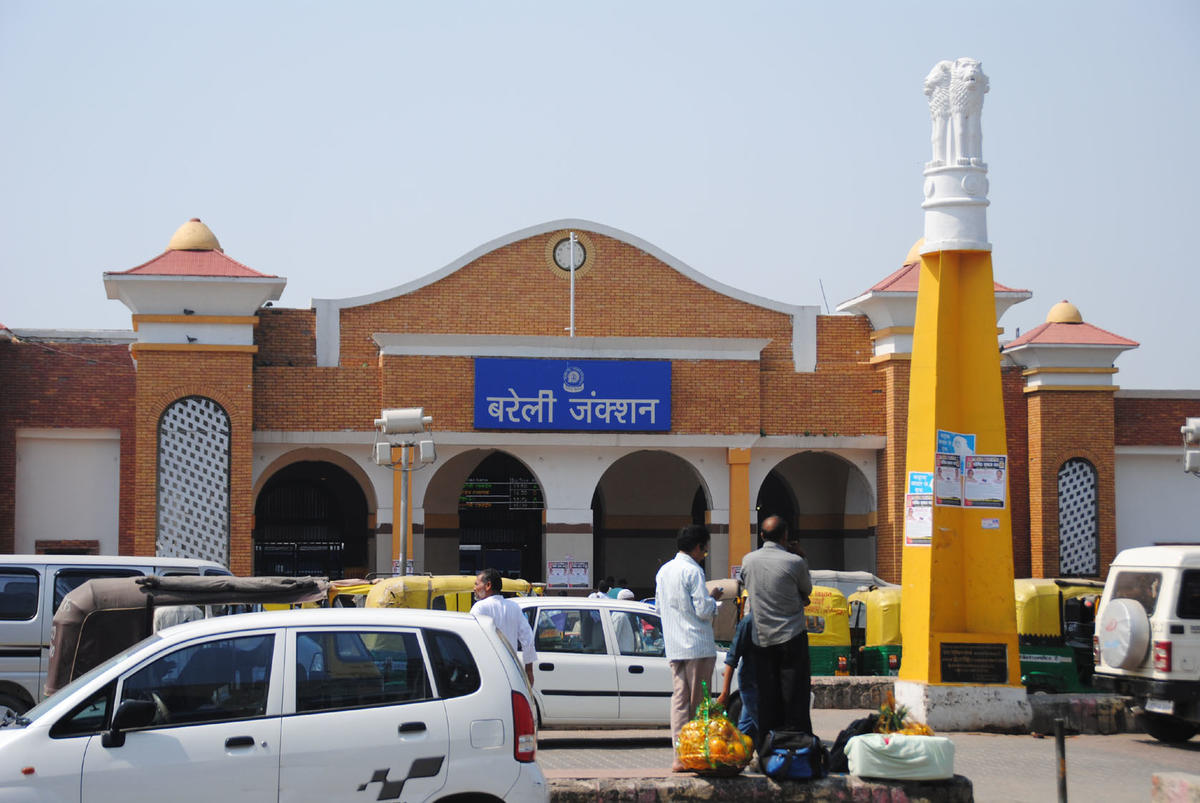
Bareilly Junction

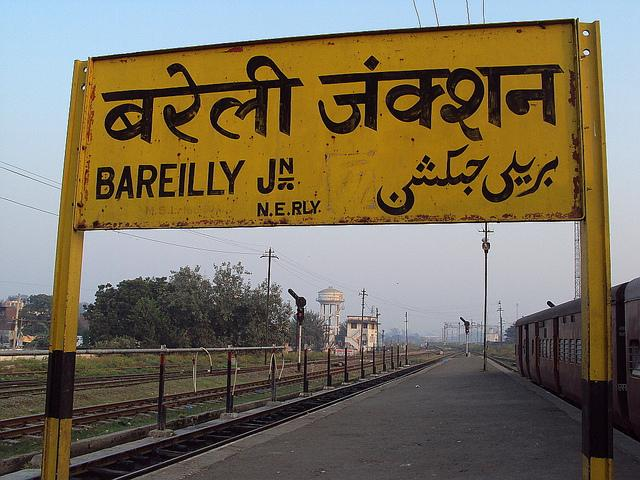
Bareilly Junction platform

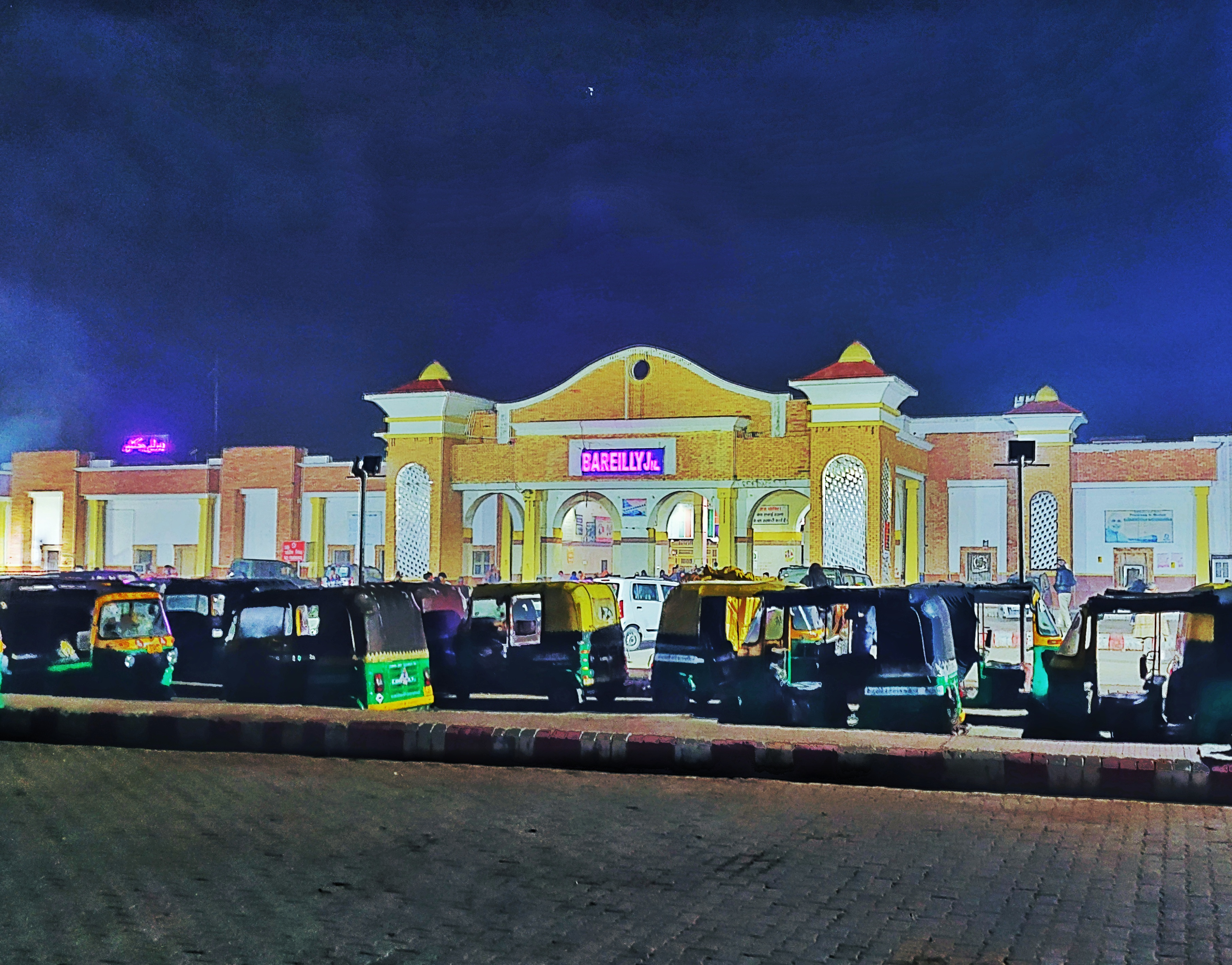
Bareilly Junction taxi stand at night

== See also ==
- List of railway stations in India
- Kerakat railway station
