= Kathgodam – Jammu Tawi Garib Rath Express =

Train in India

Jammu Tawi – Kathgodam Garib Rath Express
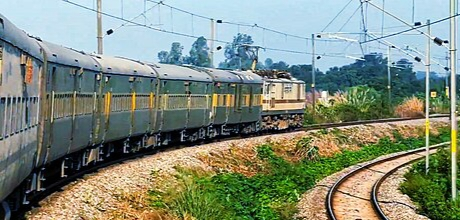
- Jammu Tawi - Kathgodam Garib Rath Express At Pathankot Cantt

Overview
- Service type: Superfast Express, Garib Rath Express
- First service: 8 April 2008
- Current operator: Northern Railways

Route
- Termini: Jammu Tawi; Kathgodam
- Stops: 15
- Distance travelled: 769 km (478 mi)
- Average journey time: 15 hours 10 minutes in both directions
- Service frequency: 12208 Jammu Tawi Kathgodam Garib Rath Express – Sunday, 12207 Kathgodam Jammu Tawi Garib Rath Express – Tuesday.
- Train number: 12207 / 12208

On-board services
- Class: AC 3 tier
- Seating arrangements: No
- Sleeping arrangements: Yes
- Catering facilities: No Pantry car attached
- Observation facilities: LHB coach
- Entertainment facilities: Big windows
- Baggage facilities: Storage space under berth

Technical
- Rolling stock: Standard Indian Railways, AC 3 tier economy coaches
- Track gauge: 1,676 mm (5 ft 6 in)
- Electrification: Yes
- Operating speed: 130 km/h (81 mph) maximum,50.10 km/h (31 mph), including halts

The 12208 / 07 Jammu Tawi – Kathgodam Garib Rath Express is a Superfast Express train of the Garib Rath series belonging to Indian Railways - Northern Railway zone that runs between Jammu Tawi and Kathgodam in India. It operates as train number 12208 from Jammu Tawi to Kathgodam and as train number 12207 in the reverse direction serving the states of Uttarakhand, Uttar Pradesh, Haryana, Punjab and Jammu and Kashmir.

== Coaches ==
The 12208 / 07 Jammu Tawi Kathgodam Garib Rath Express has 13 AC 3 tier & 2 EOG Coaches.

It does not carry a Pantry car coach. As is customary with most train services in India, Coach Composition may be amended at the discretion of Indian Railways depending on demand.

== Service ==
The 12208 / 07 Jammu Tawi Kathgodam Garib Rath Express covers the distance of 769 km (478 mi) in 15 hours 10 mins averaging 50.10 km/h (31 mph) in both directions.

Despite the average speed of the train being below 55 km/h (34 mph), as per Indian Railways rules, its fare includes a Superfast surcharge.

== Routing ==
The 12208 / 07 Jammu Tawi Kathgodam Garib Rath Express runs from Jammu Tawi via pathankot cantonment, Jalandahr cantonment junction, Ludhiana Junction, Ambala Cantt Junction, Yamunanagar Jaghdari, Saharanpur Junction, Laksar Junction, Moradabad, Rampur Junction, Bilaspur Road, Rudrapur City, Lalkuan, Haldwani and Kathgodam

It is the only train of Indian Railways that runs between Jammu Tawi and Kathgodam.

== Tarction ==
A Ludhiana or Ghaziabad based WAP-7 locomotive powers the train for its entire journey.

== Rake sharing ==
The 12208 / 07 Jammu Tawi Kathgodam Garib Rath Express shares its rake with 12209 / 10 Kathgodam Kanpur Central Garib Rath Express as follows:

12208 Jammu Tawi Kathgodam Garib Rath Express leaves Jammu Tawi on Sunday arriving Kathgodam on Monday then

12210 Kathgodam Kanpur Central Garib Rath Express leaves Kathgodam on Monday arriving Kanpur Central on Tuesday then

12209 Kanpur Central Kathgodam Garib Rath Express leaves Kanpur Central on Tuesday arriving Kathgodam the same day then

12207 Kathgodam Jammu Tawi Garib Rath Express leaves Kathgodam on Tuesday arriving back at Jammu Tawi on Wednesday.

== Operation ==
12208 Jammu Tawi Kathgodam Garib Rath Express leaves Jammu Tawi every Sunday and reaches Kathgodam the next day.

12207 Kathgodam Jammu Tawi Garib Rath Express leaves Kathgodam every Tuesday and reaches Jammu Tawi the next day.
