= Uttarakhand Sampark Kranti Express =

Train service in India

Uttaranchal Sampark Kranti Express
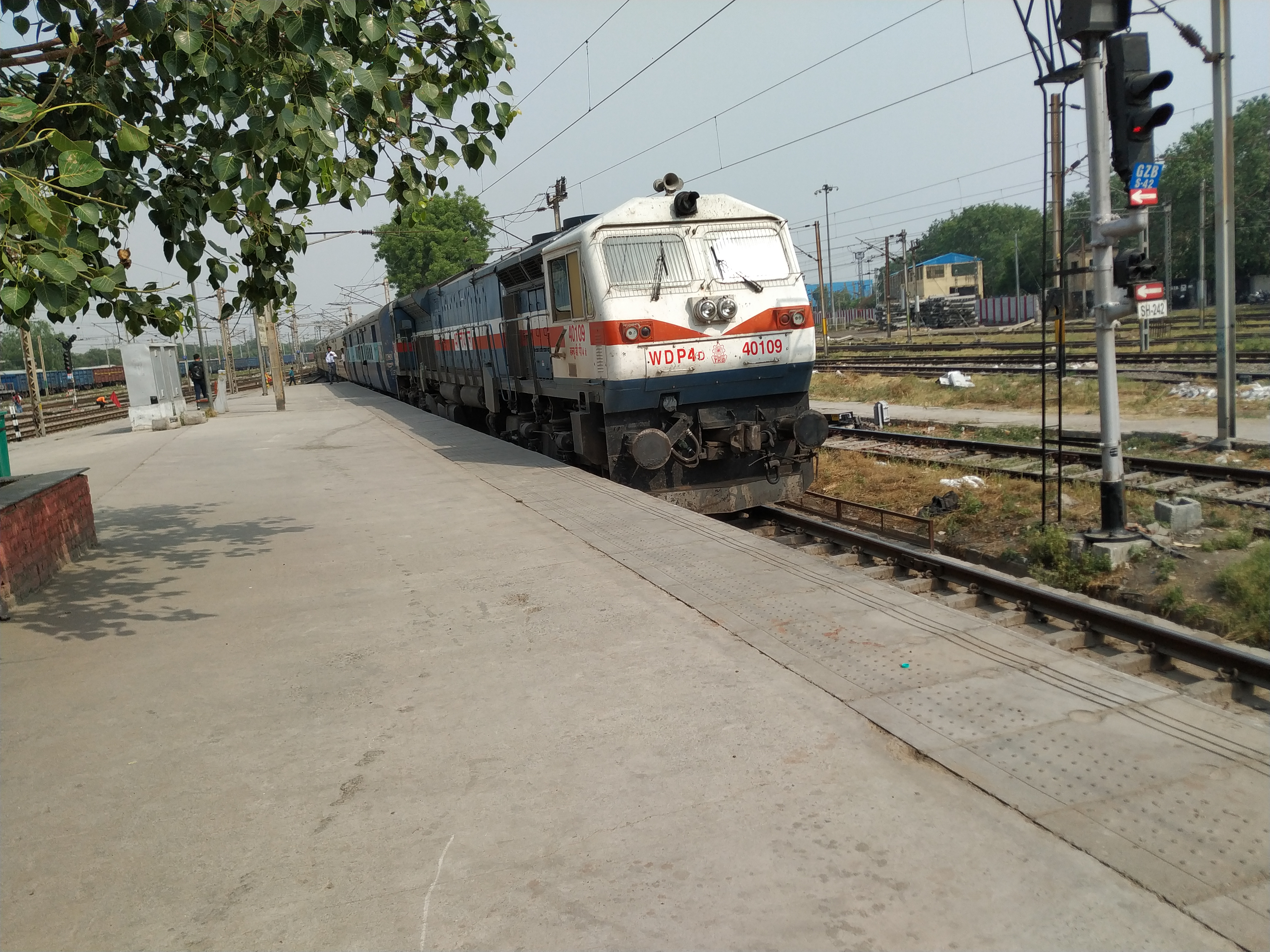

Overview
- Service type: Sampark Kranti Express
- Locale: Delhi, Uttar Pradesh & Uttarakhand
- First service: 20 October 2004; 21 years ago
- Current operator: North Eastern Railways

Route
- Termini: Old Delhi (DLI); Ramnagar (RMR) / Kathgodam (KGM)
- Stops: 8
- Distance travelled: 239 km (149 mi); 277 km (172 mi)
- Average journey time: 4h 40m 6h 40m
- Service frequency: Sunday, Monday, Wednesday, Friday and Saturday.
- Train numbers: 15035 / 15036; 25035 / 25036

On-board services
- Classes: AC Chair Car, Chair Car, General Unreserved
- Seating arrangements: Yes
- Sleeping arrangements: No
- Catering facilities: On-board catering E-catering
- Baggage facilities: Available

Technical
- Rolling stock: ICF coach
- Track gauge: 1,676 mm (5 ft 6 in)
- Operating speed: 110 km/h (68 mph) average including halts
Route map
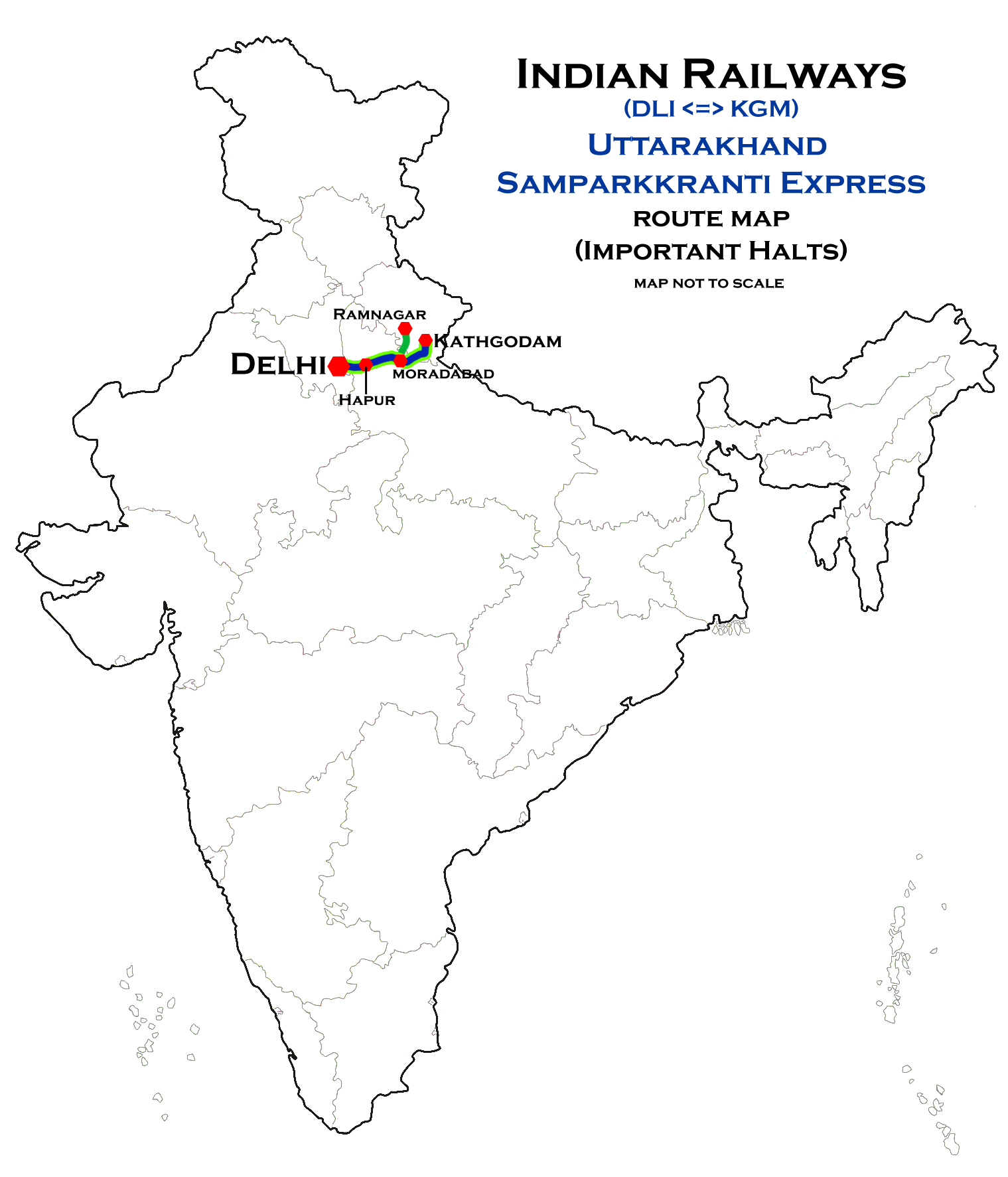

Uttaranchal Sampark Kranti Express is a Sampark Kranti Express train which connects Delhi to Ramnagar and Kathgodam of Uttarakhand state in India. The train runs daily via Moradabad, then split into two trains, one is for Ramnagar and another for Kathgodam. It is the shortest-running Sampark Kranti Express of Indian Railways.

== Detail ==
Departure from Delhi: Train splits for two destination, Ramnagar and Kathgodam at Moradabad railway station junction.

Arrival to Delhi: Train start from Kathgodam station and connect to Ramnagar Delhi Link Express for Delhi railway station.

== Locomotive ==
It is hauled by a Tughlakabad-based WDM-3A / WDP-4B / WDP-4D locomotive on its entire journey.

== Stoppage ==
- Main Route;

Old Delhi, Ghaziabad, Amroha, Moradabad, Rampur, Bilaspur Road, Rudrapur, Lalkuan Junction, Haldwani and Kathgodam.

- Slip Route;

Old Delhi, Ghaziabad, Amroha, Moradabad, Kashipur Junction and Ramnagar.

== Time table ==
Train Number	Source	Destination	Departure	Arrival
15035,25035	Old Delhi	Kathgodam & Ramnagar	16:00	22:40,20:40
15036,25036	Kathgodam & Ramnagar	Old Delhi	08:50,09:50	15:20
