= Bagh Express =

Train in India

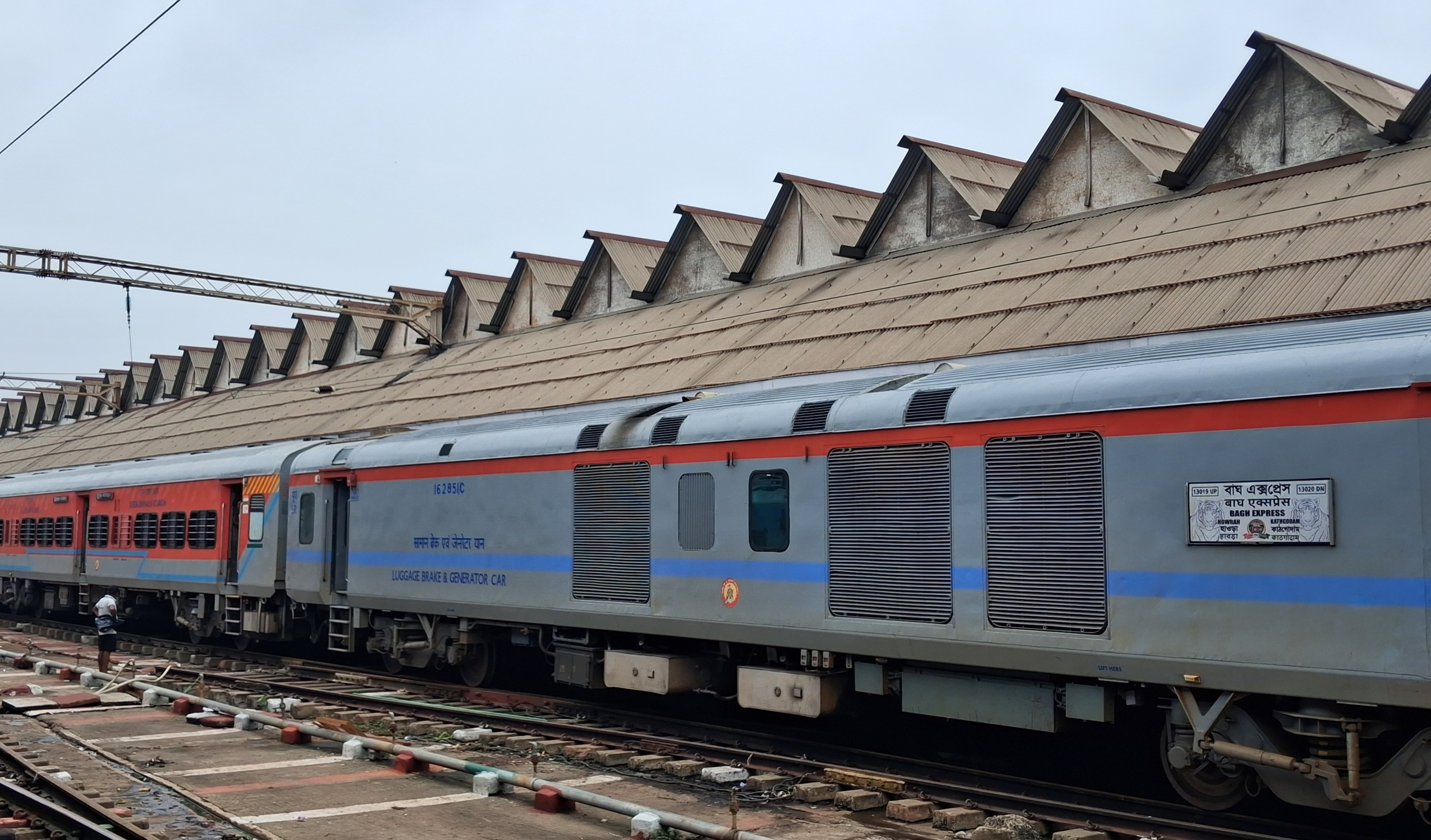
- Bagh Express standing at Howrah.

Overview
- Service type: Express
- Locale: West Bengal, Jharkhand, Bihar, Uttar Pradesh & Uttarakhand
- Current operator: Eastern Railway

Route
- Termini: Howrah (HWH); Kathgodam (KGM)
- Stops: 69
- Distance travelled: 1,514 km (941 mi)
- Average journey time: 36 hours
- Service frequency: Daily
- Train number: 13019 / 13020

On-board services
- Classes: AC 2 Tier, AC 3 Tier, Sleeper Class, General Unreserved
- Seating arrangements: Yes
- Sleeping arrangements: Yes
- Catering facilities: On-board catering, E-catering
- Observation facilities: Large windows
- Baggage facilities: Available
- Other facilities: Below the seats

Technical
- Rolling stock: LHB coach
- Track gauge: 1,676 mm (5 ft 6 in); Broad Gauge
- Operating speed: 49 km/h (30 mph) average including halts.130 km/(maximum speed),
Route map
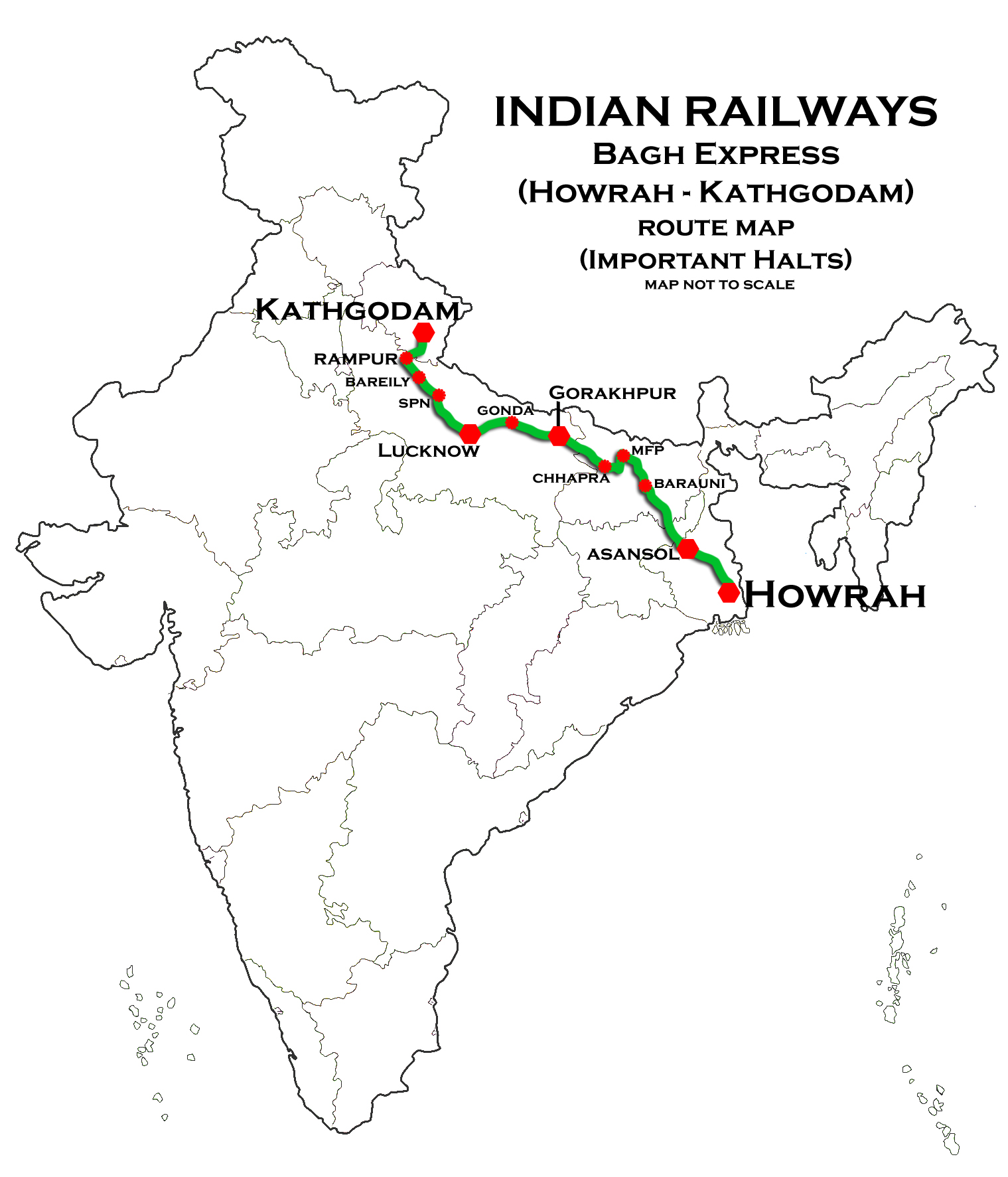

The 13019 / 13020 Bagh Express is an express train of Indian Railways connecting Kolkata (Howrah) with northern Indian town of Kathgodam (Uttarakhand). It is a very popular train among tourists of Eastern India, who are going for the Uttarakhand and Jim Corbett National Park trip. It travels through Indian states of West Bengal, Jharkhand, Bihar, Uttar Pradesh, and Uttarakhand.

== Schedule ==
13019 / 13020 Bagh Express Schedule
Train Type	Express
Distance	1513 km
Average Speed	42 km/h (13019) / 40 km/h (13020)
Journey Time (Howrah - Kathgodam)	35 hrs 50 min
Journey Time (Kathgodam - Howrah)	37 hrs 25 min
Classes Available	AC 2 Tier, AC 3 Tier, Sleeper Class, General Unreserved
Operating Days	Daily
Operator	Eastern Railway

== Route and Halts ==
Bagh Express (13019/13020) Timings
13020 KGM–HWH	Station	13019 HWH–KGM
21:50	Kathgodam	09:30
22:03/22:08	Haldwani	08:55/09:00
22:41/22:46	Lalkuan Junction	08:05/08:10
23:15/23:20	Rudrapur City	07:25/07:30
23:37/23:39	Bilaspur Road	07:03/07:05
00:25/01:00	Rampur Junction	06:05/06:35
01:47/01:57	Bareilly Junction	04:50/05:00
02:55/02:57	Shahjahanpur	03:50/03:52
03:48/03:50	Hardoi	02:12/02:14
06:10/06:20	Lucknow Charbagh	00:20/00:30
07:48/07:50	Barabanki Junction	23:18/23:20
09:20/09:30	Gonda Junction	21:20/21:30
10:18/10:20	Babhnan	19:44/19:46
10:47/10:50	Basti	19:17/19:20
12:27/12:37	Gorakhpur Junction	17:55/18:05
13:40/13:45	Deoria Sadar	16:25/16:30
14:05/14:10	Bhatni Junction	15:50/15:55
15:15/15:20	Siwan Junction	14:43/14:48
15:45/15:47	Duraundha Junction	14:18/14:20
17:15/17:25	Chhapra Junction	13:05/13:15
18:50/18:55	Hajipur Junction	11:05/11:10
20:00/20:05	Muzaffarpur Junction	10:05/10:15
21:40/21:45	Samastipur Junction	08:35/08:45
23:20/23:30	Barauni Junction	07:20/07:30
00:40/00:45	Kiul Junction	05:20/05:25
02:35/02:40	Jhajha	04:10/04:15
03:18/03:23	Jasidih Junction	02:47/02:52
03:46/03:48	Madhupur Junction	02:19/02:24
05:24/05:34	Asansol Junction	01:11/01:16
06:08/06:10	Andal Junction	00:40/00:42
08:03/08:05	Barddhaman Junction	23:21/23:23
11:15	Howrah Junction	21:40

== Coach composition ==
- 1 Luggage-cum-Brake Van (LPR)
- 1 AC 2 Tier coach
- 4 AC 3 Tier coaches
- 6 Sleeper Class coaches
- 4 General Unreserved coaches
- 1 Divyangjan coach
- 1 Guard-cum-Luggage Van (SLRD)

== Traction ==
Both trains are hauled by a Howrah Loco Shed-based WAP-7 electric locomotive from Howrah to Kathgodam and vice versa.
