= Kanpur Central–Kathgodam Garib Rath Express =

Train in India

Kathgodam - Kanpur Central Garib Rath Express

Overview
- Service type: Superfast Express, Garib Rath Express
- First service: 16 September 2008
- Current operator: Northern Railways

Route
- Termini: Kathgodam; Kanpur Central
- Stops: 10
- Distance travelled: 460 km (286 mi)
- Average journey time: 10 hours 05 minutes as 12210 Kathgodam Kanpur Central Garib Rath Express, 8 hours 50 minutes as 12209 Kanpur Central Kathgodam Garib Rath Express.
- Service frequency: 12210 Kathgodam Kanpur Central Garib Rath Express – Monday, 12209 Kanpur Central Kathgodam Garib Rath Express – Tuesday.
- Train number: 12209 / 12210

On-board services
- Class: AC 3 tier
- Seating arrangements: No
- Sleeping arrangements: Yes
- Auto-rack arrangements: No
- Catering facilities: No Pantry car attached
- Baggage facilities: Storage space under berth

Technical
- Rolling stock: Standard Indian Railways Garib Rath ICF coach
- Track gauge: 1,676 mm (5 ft 6 in)
- Electrification: No
- Operating speed: 130 km/h (81 mph) maximum,48.53 km/h (30 mph), including halts
Route map
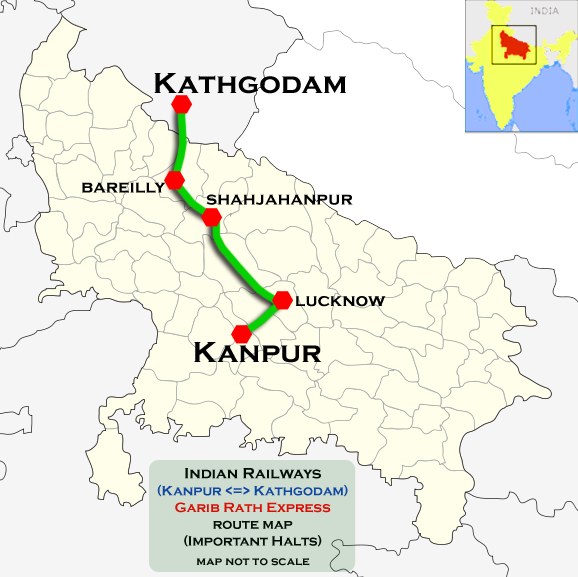

The 12210 / 09 Kathgodam Kanpur Central Garib Rath Express is a Superfast Express train of the Garib Rath series belonging to Indian Railways - Northern Railway zone that runs between Kathgodam and Kanpur Central in India.

It operates as train number 12210 from Kathgodam to Kanpur Central and as train number 12209 in the reverse direction serving the states of Uttarakhand & Uttar Pradesh.

== Coaches ==
The 12210 / 09 Kathgodam Kanpur Central Garib Rath Express has 13 AC 3 tier & 2 EOG Coaches. It does not carry a Pantry car coach.

As is customary with most train services in India, Coach Composition may be amended at the discretion of Indian Railways depending on demand.

== Service ==
The 12210 Kathgodam Kanpur Central Garib Rath Express covers the distance of 460 km (286 mi) in 10 hours 05 mins (45.52 km/h) and in 8 hours 50 mins as 12209 Kanpur Central Kathgodam Garib Rath Express (51.96 km/h).

Despite the average speed of the train being below 55 km/h (34 mph), as per Indian Railways rules, its fare includes a Superfast surcharge.

== Routing ==
The 12210 / 09 Kathgodam Kanpur Central Garib Rath Express runs from Kathgodam via Haldwani, Baheri, Izzatnagar, Bareilly, Shahjehanpur, Lucknow NE to Kanpur Central.

It reverses direction of travel during its journey at Lucknow NE.

== Traction ==
As large sections of the route are yet to be fully electrified, a Ludhiana based WDM 3A or WDP-4D locomotive powers the train for its entire journey.

== Rake sharing ==
The 12210 / 09 Kathgodam Kanpur Central Garib Rath Express shares its rake with 12208 / 07 Jammu Tawi Kathgodam Garib Rath Express as follows:

12208 Jammu Tawi Kathgodam Garib Rath Express leaves Jammu Tawi on Sunday arriving Kathgodam on Monday then

12210 Kathgodam Kanpur Central Garib Rath Express leaves Kathgodam on Monday arriving Kanpur Central on Tuesday then

12209 Kanpur Central Kathgodam Garib Rath Express leaves Kanpur Central on Tuesday arriving Kathgodam the same day then

12207 Kathgodam Jammu Tawi Garib Rath Express leaves Kathgodam on Tuesday arriving back at Jammu Tawi on Wednesday.

== Operation ==
12210 Kathgodam Kanpur Central Garib Rath Express leaves Kathgodam on Monday arriving Kanpur Central on Tuesday.

12209 Kanpur Central Kathgodam Garib Rath Express leaves Kanpur Central on Tuesday arriving Kathgodam the same day.
