= Naini Doon Jan Shatabdi Express =

Jan Shatabdi Express train in India

Kathgodam - Dehradun Naini Doon Jan Shatabdi Express
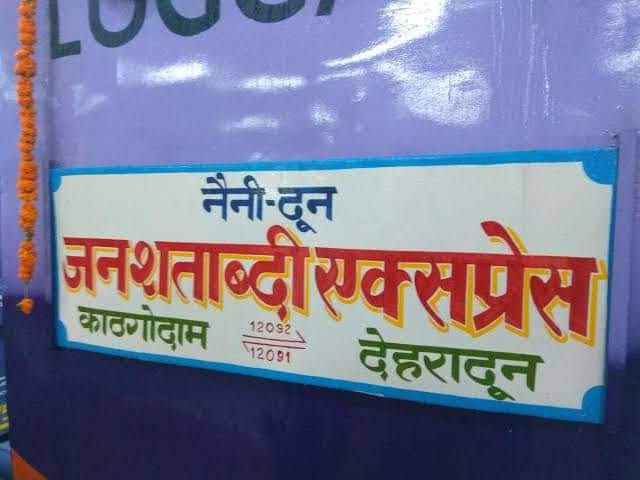

Overview
- Service type: Superfast, Jan Shatabdi Express
- First service: 23 August 2018; 8 years ago
- Current operator: North Eastern Railways (NER)

Route
- Termini: Kathgodam (KGM); Dehradun (DDN)
- Stops: 7
- Distance travelled: 336 km (209 mi)
- Average journey time: 7 hours 35 mins (12091 Dehradun to Kathgodam); 7 hours 5 mins (12092 Kathgodam to Dehradun)
- Service frequency: Five days a week (except Tuesdays and Thursdays)
- Train number: 12091/12092

On-board services
- Classes: AC Chair Car, 2nd Class seating, Unreserved/General
- Seating arrangements: Yes
- Sleeping arrangements: No
- Catering facilities: On-board catering E-catering
- Baggage facilities: Overhead racks

Technical
- Rolling stock: ICF coach
- Track gauge: 1,676 mm (5 ft 6 in)
- Electrification: Yes
- Operating speed: 105 km/h (65 mph) maximum, 45 km/h (30 mph) average including halts

The 12091/12092 Kathgodam–Dehradun Naini Doon Jan Shatabdi Express is a Superfast Express train of the Jan Shatabdi Express series belonging to Indian Railways – North Eastern Railway zone that runs between Kathgodam and Dehradun in India.

It operates as train number 12092 from Kathgodam to Dehradun and as train number 12091 in the reverse direction, serving the states of Uttar Pradesh and Uttarakhand.

It is among the latest trains introduced in the Jan Shatabdi Express series which were originally started by the then railway minister of India Mr. Nitish Kumar during the 2002–03 railway budget.

== Coaches ==
The 12092/91 Kathgodam–Dehradun Naini Doon Jan Shatabdi Express has two AC Chair Car, five 2nd Class seating, three Unreserved/General and two Seating cum Luggage Rake coaches. It does not carry a pantry car.

As is customary with most train services in India, coach composition may be amended at the discretion of Indian Railways depending on demand.

== Service ==
The 12092 Kathgodam–Dehradun Naini Doon Jan Shatabdi Express covers the distance of 336 km (209 mi) in 7 hours 15 mins averaging 46.34 km/h (28.79 mph) and in 7 hours 35 mins as 12091 Dehradun–Kathgodam Naini Doon Jan Shatabdi Express averaging 44.31 km/h (27.53 mph)

Despite the average speed of the train being below 55 km/h (35 mph), as per Indian Railways rules, its fare includes a Superfast surcharge

.

== Routeing ==
The 12091/12092 Kathgodam–Dehradun Naini Doon Jan Shatabdi Express runs from Kathgodam via Haldwani Lalkuan Junction, Rampur Junction, Moradabad, Najibabad Junction, Haridwar Junction to Dehradun

== Traction ==
As the route is fully electrified, Ghaziabad-based WAP-5 and WAP-7(HOG Equipped) locomotive powers the train for its entire journey.

== Operation ==
The 12091 / 12092 Kathgodam–Dehradun Naini Doon Jan Shatabdi Express runs five days a week (excluding Monday and Thursday).
