= Vibha Dadheech =

Indian classical dancer (born 1954)

Dr Vibha Dadheech
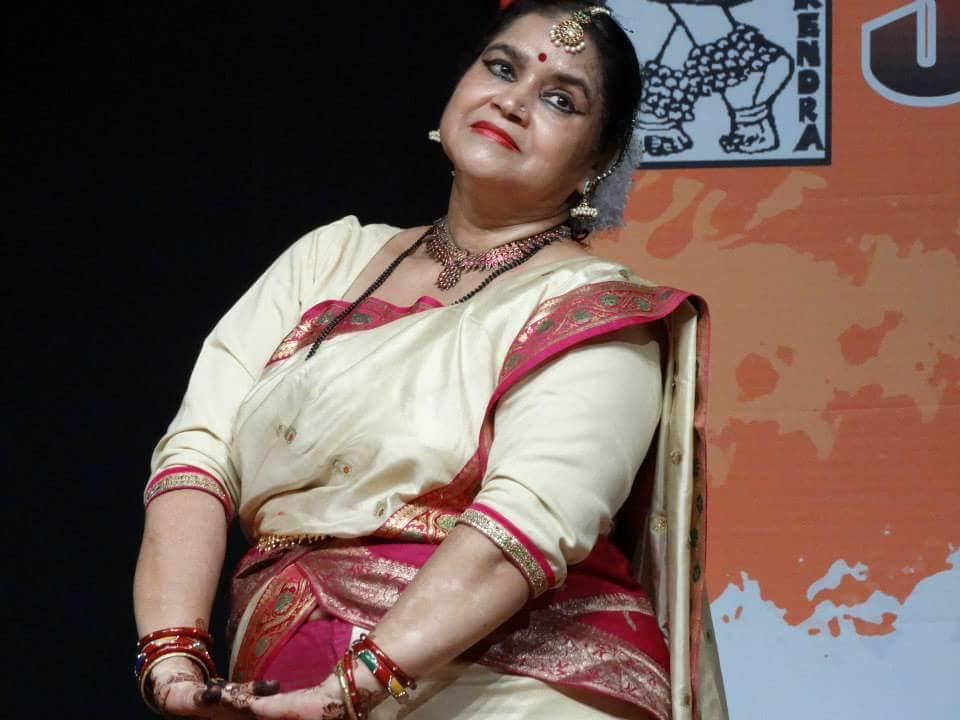
- Vibha Dadheech performing ‘Khandita Nayak’ at Jaipur Kathak Kendra, Kathak Mahotsav 2014
- Born: Vibha Rani Gupta; 12 March 1954 (age 72)
- Occupations: Kathak Dancer, Kathak Scholar, Author, Educationist
- Years active: since 1963
- Dancing career
- Dances: Kathak

Vibha Dadheech (born 12 March 1954) is an Indian classical dancer in the Kathak dance form. She began learning Kathak from Raigarh Court dancer Pt. Firtu Maharaj, and later in Guru Shishya Parampara from Pt. Shambhu Maharaj as a ganda bandh shagird, living and learning at her guru’s home. She is also the senior-most disciple and wife of Puru Dadheech. Together they founded the Natavari Kathak Nritya Academy, Indore. Currently, Vibha Dadheech is serving as Professor Emeritus at world’s first dedicated Kathak Research centre at the Sri Sri University, The Sri Sri Centre for Advanced Research in Kathak.

Vibha graduated in 1988 with a doctorate PhD in Kathak from Indira Kala Sangeet Vishwavidyalaya Khairagarh. Her topic for research was Dance Hand Gestures - Bharatiya Nritya ki Varnamala: Hast Mudrayen. Which include more than 1100 hand gestures with their definitions from approximately 23 shastra granthas. The research is also a published book by the same title.

Dadheech has been felicitated with India’s highest award to a performing artist, the Sangeet Natak Akademi Award and Madhya Pradesh's highest Civilian Award The Shikhar Samman.

She was awarded the Senior Fellowship from the Ministry of Culture, Govt. of India in Kathak for the year 2011–12.

She is an author and published her research book Bharatiya Nritya ki Varnamala: Hast Mudrayen (ABC of Indian Dance Gestures) in Hindi language. Hardcover - 2003 ISBN 978-8190105712 Her book has also been prescribed as reference book for the Bachelor level of Dance syllabus at Devi Ahilya University, Indore.

Vibha has received the Life-time Achievement Award 2015 at the 25th Gopi Krishna Mahotsav, Mumbai for serving Kathak for over 50 years. She collaborated with 40 other artists to create Kala Arpan that was launched by Sri Ravi Shankar.

== Family ==
Vibha was born to noted Gandhian freedom fighter Shri Bhramarji Gupta and Purna Gupta at Bilaspur (then Madhya Pradesh). She is the youngest of four siblings and is married to the Kathak dancer and educationist Puru Dadheech. She has two sons and a daughter.

== Education ==
- Doctorate in Kathak 1988 from Indira Kala Sangeet Vishwavidyalaya Khairagarh
- Kathak under Guru Shishya Parampara from Pt. Firtu Maharaj and Pt. Shambhu Maharaj

== Awards ==
- Sangeet Natak Akademi Award Akademi Puraskar for 2021 (SNA)
- Shikhar Samman 2018 - Madhya Pradesh's highest civilian award (for excellence in Kathak dance)
- Senior Fellowship 2011 by Ministry of Culture, Govt. of India
- Lifetime Achievement Award 2015 for serving Kathak for over 50 years, at 25th Gopi Krishna Mahotsav

== Books ==
- BHARTIYA NRITYA KI VARNMAALA HAST MUDRAYEN (The ABC of Indian Dance Hand Gestures) ISBN 978-8190105712
- NRITYA NIBANDH, Bindu Prakashan 2009 ISBN 81-901057-6-0
- GAT NIKAS - KATHAK NRITYA KA APARIHARYA ANG, Bindu Prakashan. Researched under Senior Fellowship by Ministry of Culture (India), 2019.
