= New Delhi–Kathgodam Shatabdi Express =

Shatabdi Express train in India

New Delhi – Kathgodam Shatabdi Express
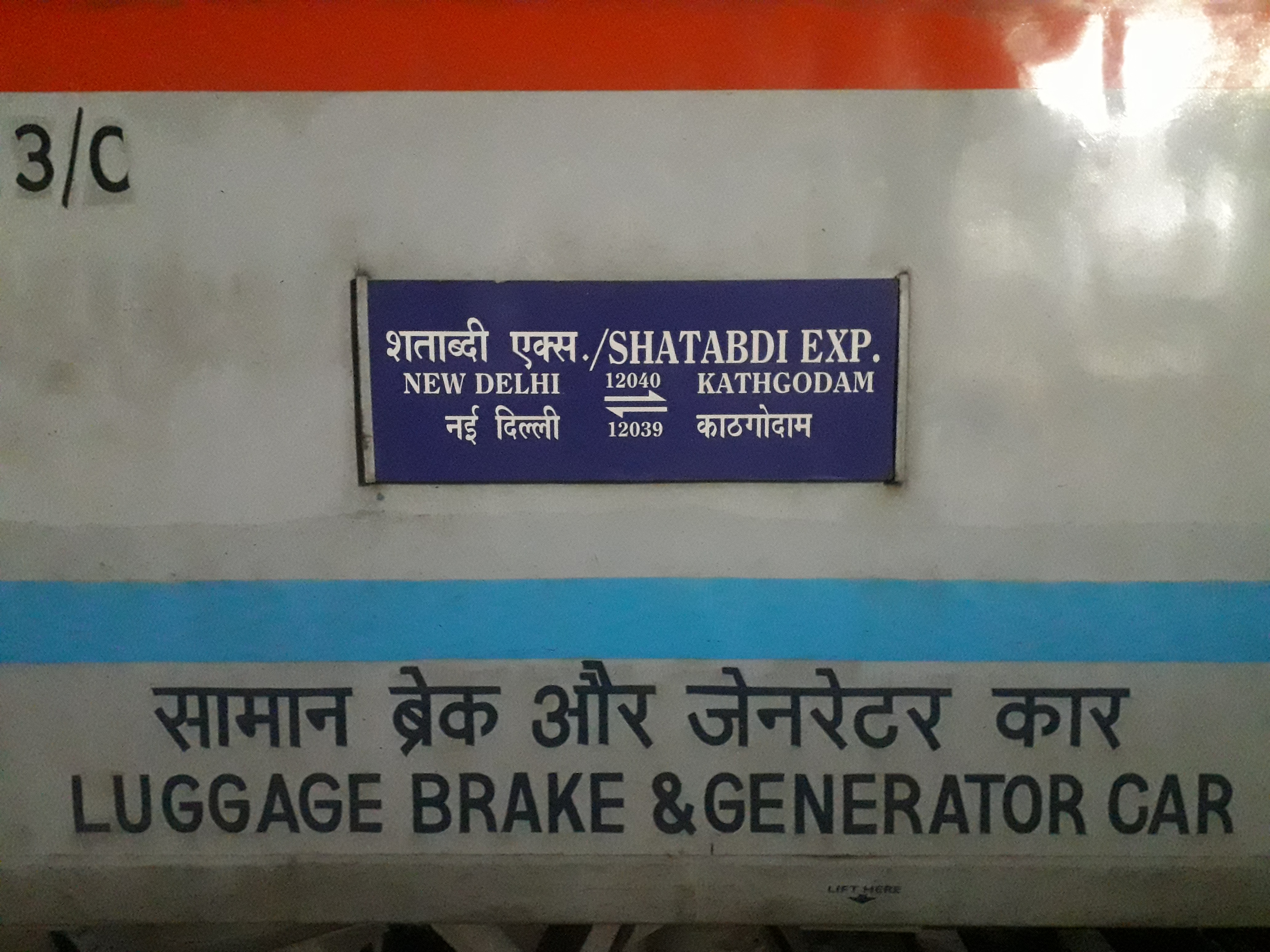

Overview
- Service type: Shatabdi Express
- First service: 17 March 2012
- Current operator(s): Northern Railways

Route
- Termini: New Delhi (NDLS); Kathgodam (KGM)
- Stops: 9
- Distance travelled: 282 km (175 mi)
- Average journey time: 05 hours 30 minutes as 12039 from New Delhi to Kathgodam, 05 hours 40 minutes as 12040 from Kathgodam to New Delhi
- Service frequency: 7 days a week
- Train number(s): 12039 / 12040
- Line(s) used: New Delhi–Moradabad; Moradabad–Kathgodam line

On-board services
- Class(es): Executive Class, AC Chair Car
- Seating arrangements: Yes
- Sleeping arrangements: No
- Catering facilities: On-board catering E-catering
- Baggage facilities: Overhead racks

Technical
- Rolling stock: LHB coach
- Track gauge: 1,676 mm (5 ft 6 in)
- Electrification: Yes
- Operating speed: 110 km/h (68 mph) maximum, 50 km/h (31 mph) average including halts

The 12040 / 12039 New Delhi–Kathgodam Shatabdi Express is an Indian train of the Shatabdi Express category belonging to Northern Railway zone that runs between New Delhi and Kathgodam, the nearest rail-head to many tourist destinations in Uttarakhand like Nainital, Ranikhet etc.

It currently operates as train number 12040 from New Delhi to Kathgodam and as train number 12039 in the reverse direction, serving the states of Delhi, Uttar Pradesh and Uttarakhand.

== Inception of the service ==
As the need of a fast, air conditioned train to Haldwani, Lalkuan and Kathgodam was raised by several political leaders and citizens, Northern Railways decided to run an "AC Superfast" special service on temporary basis in late 2011. The train used to run on Wednesdays, Fridays and Sundays from both ends and on a time-table similar to today's Shatabdi Express. On receiving a satisfactory response, the 12039/40 Shatabdi Express was introduced on the same slot on other four days. The first run was made on 17 March 2012. Later by May 2012, the frequency of the Shatabdi Express was increased to six days a week and the AC Special was done away with.

== Service ==
The Kathgodam-bound train covers the distance of 282 kilometres in 05 hours 35 mins (49 km/h) while in the return direction it takes in 05 hours 35 mins (50 km/h). The service was initially slower but speeded up by 5 minutes and 20 minutes respectively in the time-table revision of 2014 but again slowed down by 10 minutes and 20 minutes respectively in the time-table revision of 2022.

The train is the slowest member of the Shatabdi category of trains owing to the steep gradients in the Lalkuan-Kathgodam section, and single-line operation after Rampur Junction.

== Journey ==
The schedule of this 12039/12040 New Delhi - Kathgodam Shatabdi Express is given below:-

NDLS - KGM - NDLS Shatabdi Express
12040		Stations	12039	
Arrival	Departure	Stations	Arrival	Departure
----	06:20	New Delhi	20:55	----
06:53	06:55	Ghaziabad Junction	20:08	20:10
08:51	08:56	Moradabad Junction	18:10	18:15
09:26	09:28	Rampur Junction	17:35	17:37
09:48	09:50	Bilaspur Road	16:55	16:57
10:01	10:03	Rudrapur City	16:41	16:43
10:45	10:48	Lal Kuan Junction	16:08	16:10
11:24	11:26	Haldwani	15:33	15:35
11:55	----	Kathgodam	----	15:20

The 12040 / 39 New Delhi–Kathgodam Shatabdi Express runs from New Delhi via Ghaziabad Junction, Moradabad, Rudrapur City to Kathgodam.

Being a Shatabdi class train, it returns to its originating station New Delhi at the end of the day.

== Loco link ==
As the route is fully electrified, a WAP-7 locomotive powers the train for its entire journey.

== Gallery ==
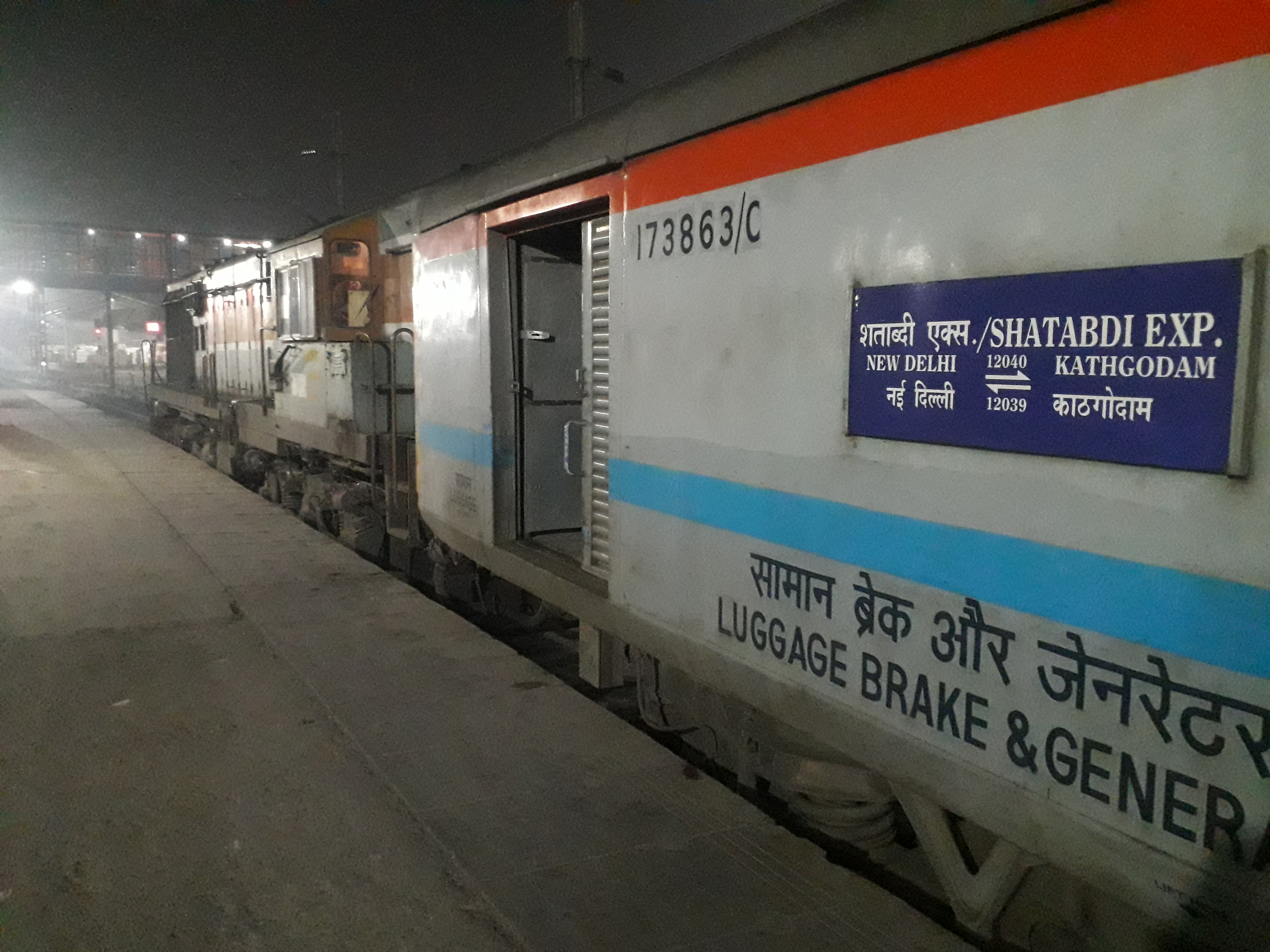
12039 New Delhi–Kathgodam Shatabdi Express with Ludhiana-based WDM-3A

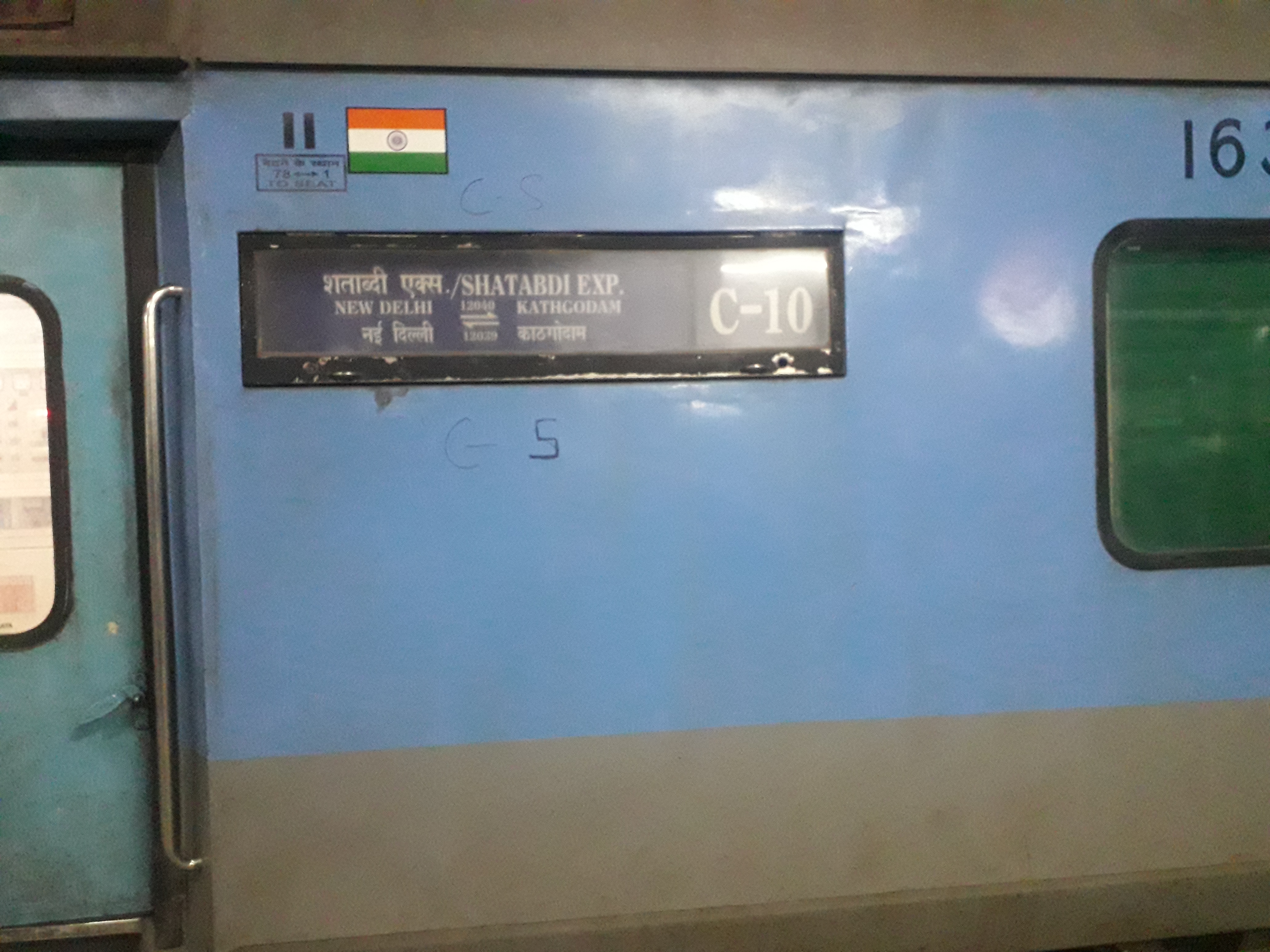
12039 New Delhi–Kathgodam Shatabdi Express – Chair Car coach C10

== Change in terminal ==
With effect from 11 December 2015, the Kathgodam-bound Shatabdi has been operating from the New Delhi railway station. Accordingly, the departure time of 12040 has been changed to 06:20 hrs instead of 06:00hrs. The revised arrival time of 12039 at New Delhi railway station is 20:50. The change in terminal will hugely benefit tourists as the New Delhi railway station is connected to the Airport Express (Orange Line) of Delhi Metro and is also closer to the Main Bazar in Paharganj, a popular destination for tourists.
