= HDW (disambiguation) =

HDW may refer to:

- Howaldtswerke-Deutsche Werft, a German shipbuilder
- Hadley Wood railway station, in London
- Haldwani railway station, in Uttarakhand, India
