= Bilaspur Road railway station =

Railway station in Uttar Pradesh, India

General information
- Location: Bilaspur Road, Rampur district, Uttar Pradesh; India
- Coordinates: 28°51′54″N 79°15′13″E
- Elevation: 108 metres (354 ft)
- System: Indian Railways station
- Owner: Indian Railways
- Operator: Izzatnagar railway division
- Platforms: 1
- Tracks: 3
- Connections: Auto stand

Construction
- Structure type: Standard (on-ground station)
- Parking: No
- Cycle facilities: No

Other information
- Status: Functioning
- Station code: BLQR
- Fare zone: North Eastern Railway
Location
- Location within India Location within Uttar Pradesh

Bilaspur Road railway station is a small railway station in Rampur district, Uttar Pradesh. Its code is BLQR. It serves Bilaspur city. The station consists of a single platform. The platform is not well sheltered. It lacks many facilities including water and sanitation.

== Trains ==
- Ranikhet Express
- Kathgodam Express
- Bagh Express
- Kathgodam–Moradabad Passenger
- Uttarakhand Sampark Kranti Express
- Kathgodam–Jammu Tawi Garib Rath Express
- New Delhi–Kathgodam Shatabdi Express
