= Rudrapur City railway station =

Indian railway station

Rudrapur Railway Station
- Indian Railways logo

General information
- Location: Railway Mal Godown Road, Udham Singh Nagar, Uttarakhand; India
- Coordinates: 28.9695°N 79.3798°E
- Elevation: 208 metres (682 ft)
- System: Indian Railways station
- Owner: Indian Railways
- Platforms: 2
- Tracks: 4
- Connections: Auto stand

Construction
- Structure type: At grade
- Platform levels: Single
- Parking: Yes
- Cycle facilities: No

Other information
- Status: Functioning
- Station code: RUPC
- Zone(s): Northern Eastern Railway
- Division(s): Izzatnagar
Location

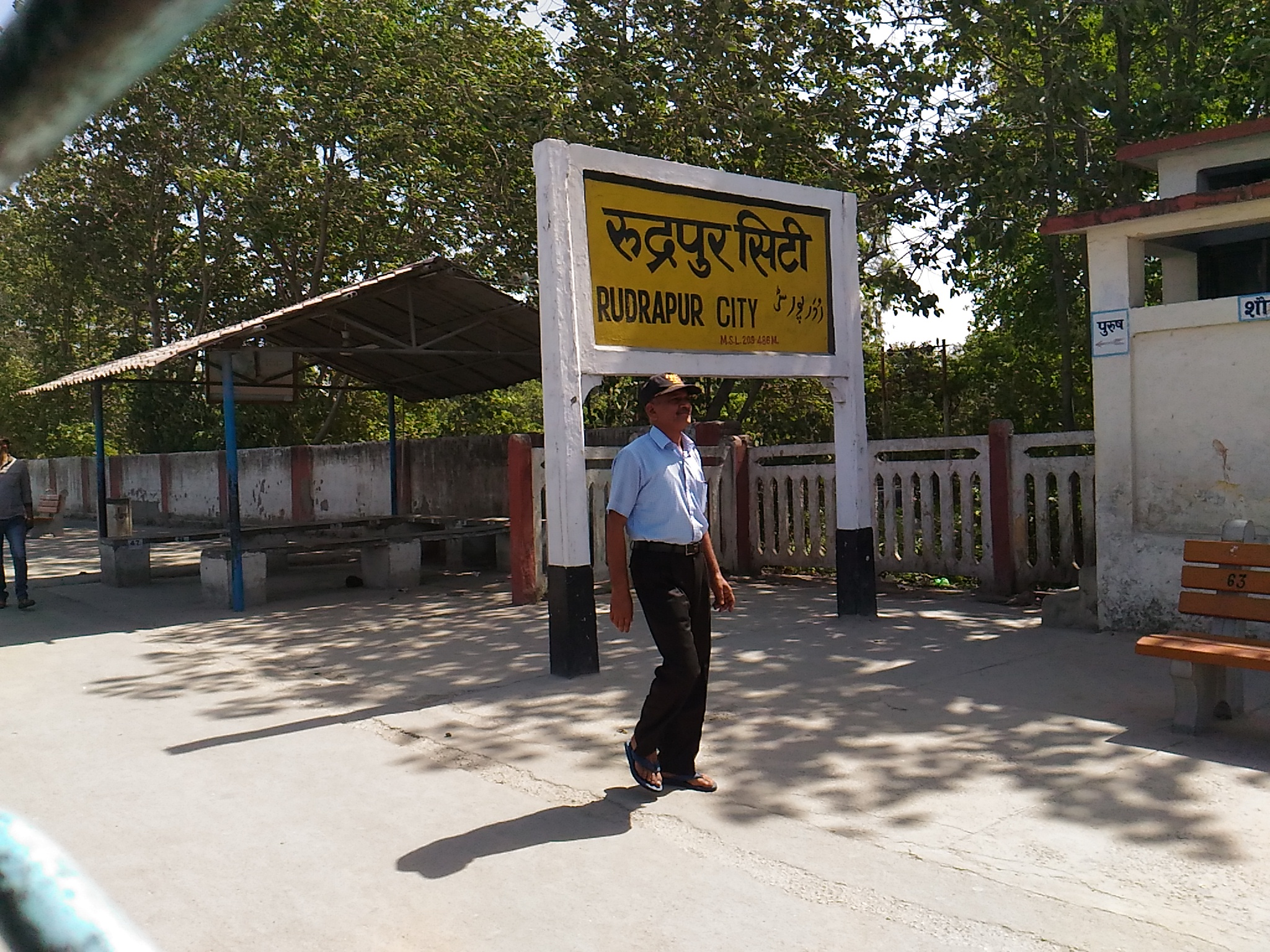
Rudrapur City Railway Station signboard

Rudrapur City Railway Station is a small railway station in Udham Singh Nagar district, Uttarakhand. Its code is RUPC. It serves Rudrapur city. The station consists of two platforms. The platforms are not well sheltered. It lacks many facilities including water and sanitation. It links to delhi railway.

== Major trains ==
- Bagh Express
- Naini Doon Jan Shatabdi Express
- Kathgodam Express
- Uttarakhand Sampark Kranti Express
- Ranikhet Express
- Kathgodam–Moradabad Passenger
- Kathgodam–Jammu Tawi Garib Rath Express
- New Delhi–Kathgodam Shatabdi Express
