= Shahi, Uttar Pradesh =

- Town
- Location in Uttar Pradesh, India Shahi, Uttar Pradesh (India)
- Coordinates: 28.55°N 79.32°E
- Country: India
- State: Uttar Pradesh
- District: Bareilly
- Elevation: 171 m (561 ft)

Population (2001)
  - Total: 13,898

Languages
  - Official: Hindi
- Time zone: UTC+5:30 (IST)
- Vehicle registration: UP, 25
- Website: up.gov.in

Shahi is a town and a Nagar Panchayat in Bareilly district in the Indian state of Uttar Pradesh. Shahi is one of the oldest British town areas, the first Chairman was Haji Nadir Shah khan in 1868. The current Chairman is Veer Pal Mourya from the year 2023.

== History ==
Shahi is an old town, Shahi is named by Shershah Suri, serving as a stronghold of the Katehria Rajputs before coming under Islamic rule. It was the seat of a pargana at least from the time of Akbar, and probably earlier. It is mentioned in the Ain-i-Akbarias a pargana in the sarkar of Sambhal, producing a revenue of 900,496 dams for the imperial treasury and a force of 200 infantry and 20 cavalry to the Mughal army. Parts of the pargana were later transferred to Karor. Shahi also formed the seat of a tehsil from 1813 until 1824 or 1825, when it was merged with Ajaon with the headquarters at Dunka. Then in 1863 it was put under Mirganj tehsil.

Around the turn of the 20th century, Shahi was described as a small market town, with markets held twice a week Tuesday & Saturday and a small fair held every Thursday. There was a police station, a post office, a cattle-pound, a middle school, a girls' school, and a canal inspection office. The population in 2011 was 16,950, with 5,532 being Hindu, 11,380, being Muslim, and 38 belonging to other religious groups.

== Geography ==
Shahi is located at 28.55°N 79.32°E. It has an average elevation of 171 metres (561 feet). The town is on the banks of the Gaula River.

== Demographics ==
As of the 2011 Census of India, Shahi had a population of 16,950. Males constitute 52% of the population and females 47.8%. Shahi has an average literacy rate of 35.85%, lower than the national average of 59.5%: male literacy is 42.80%, and female literacy is 28.28%. In Shahi, 22% of the population is under six years of age.
