= Gaula River (India) =

Coordinates: 28.4175°N 79.2579°E

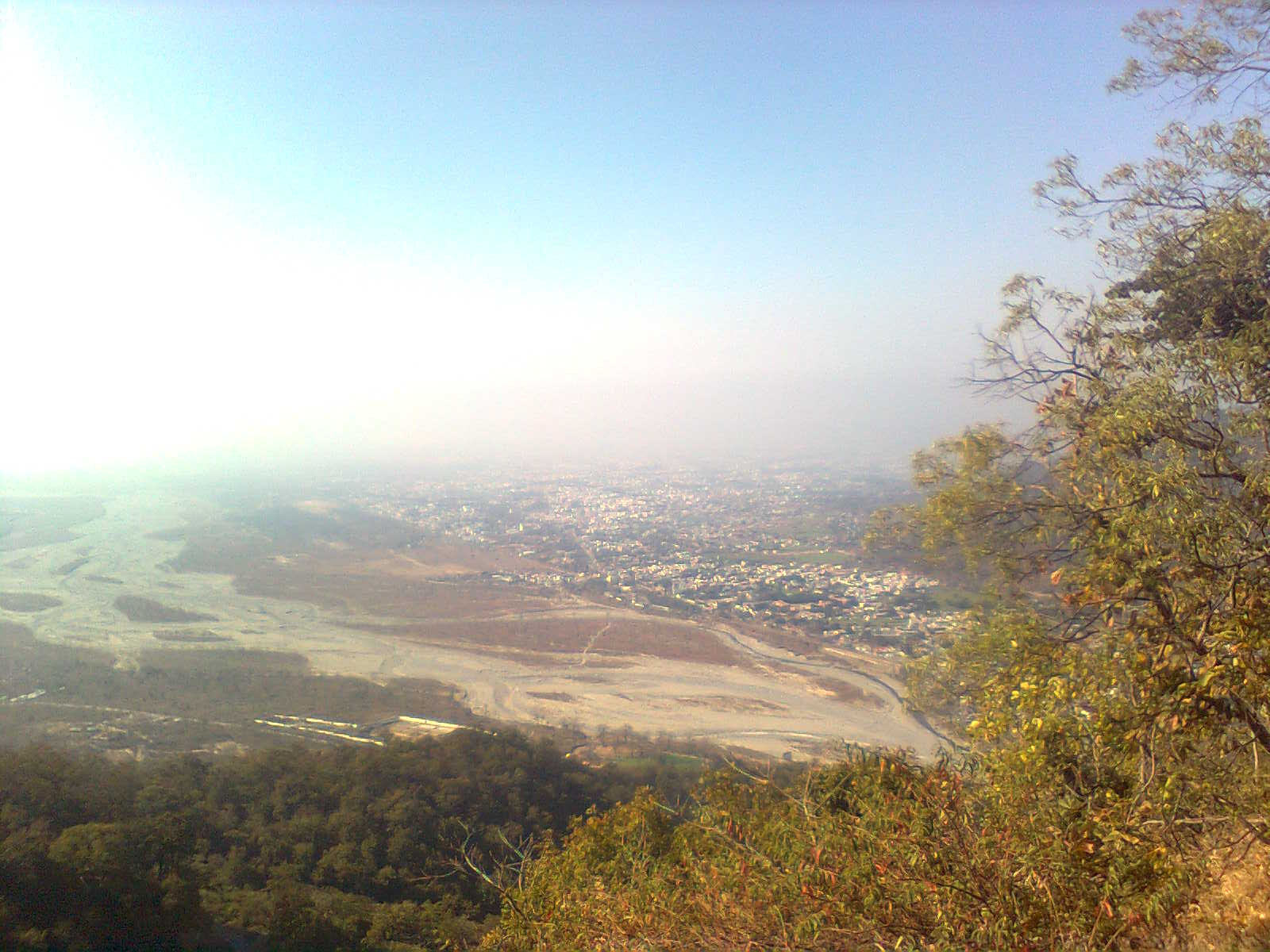
- Gaula River flowing by Haldwani-Kathgodam

Location
- Country: India
- State: Uttarakhand
- City: Haldwani

Physical characteristics
- Source: Paharpani
- Length: 578 km (359 mi)

The Gaula River, or Gola River, is a river in India originating in the Lesser Himalayas. It is approximately 500 km (310 mi) long. The river is also known by the names of Kichha and Baigul (or more specifically Baigul West) in its lower course. It originates in the Paharpani Village of Uttarakhand state, and flows south past Kathgodam, Haldwani, Kichha and Shahi, finally joining the Ramganga River about 15 km (9.3 mi) northwest of Bareilly in Uttar Pradesh, Ramganga in turn is a tributary of the river Ganges. It is mainly a spring fed river; this river is source of water for Haldwani and Kathgodam. A beautiful dam exists over this river in Kathgodam.

== Mining ==
This is also controversial due to illegal mining. The government plans to install remote sensor anti-theft devices.

== Ecology ==
Over the years, due erosion and deforestation the Gaula catchment has become prone to landslides and the springs in it and overall rainfall have declined leading to reduction in its flow. The Gaula riverbed after it hits the plain near Haldwani has also been facing erosion to excessive quarrying. When despite Supreme Court's directive which effectively banned quarrying while only allowing silt deposit removal, has led to public protests in the regions and a bandh (mass strike) in Haldwani in December 2009 by activists, alleging nexus between stone crushing and mining industry and the administration.

The steady erosion of the Gola river forest corridor threatens the survival of tigers and elephants in the Terai region.

== Gaula Dam ==
A barrage on this river, known as the Gaula Barrage, is located at Kathgodam. The barrage is a landmark for the local residents. It provides irrigation water for the bhabar fields.

== Bridge near Haldwani-Kathgodam ==
Development of bridge over this river in Haldwani-Kathgodam area has been controversial for long.

== Image Gallery ==
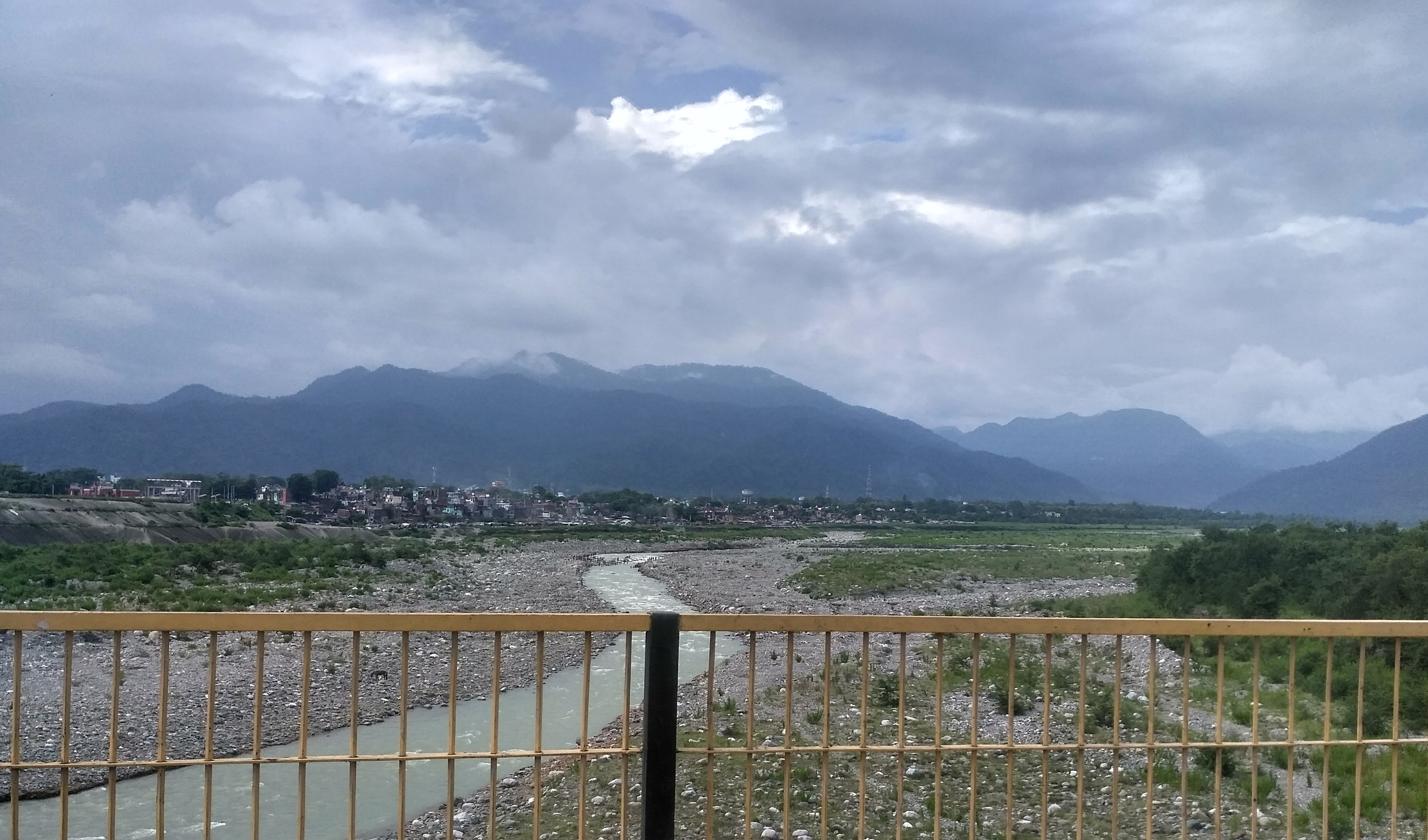
Gaula in Haldwani

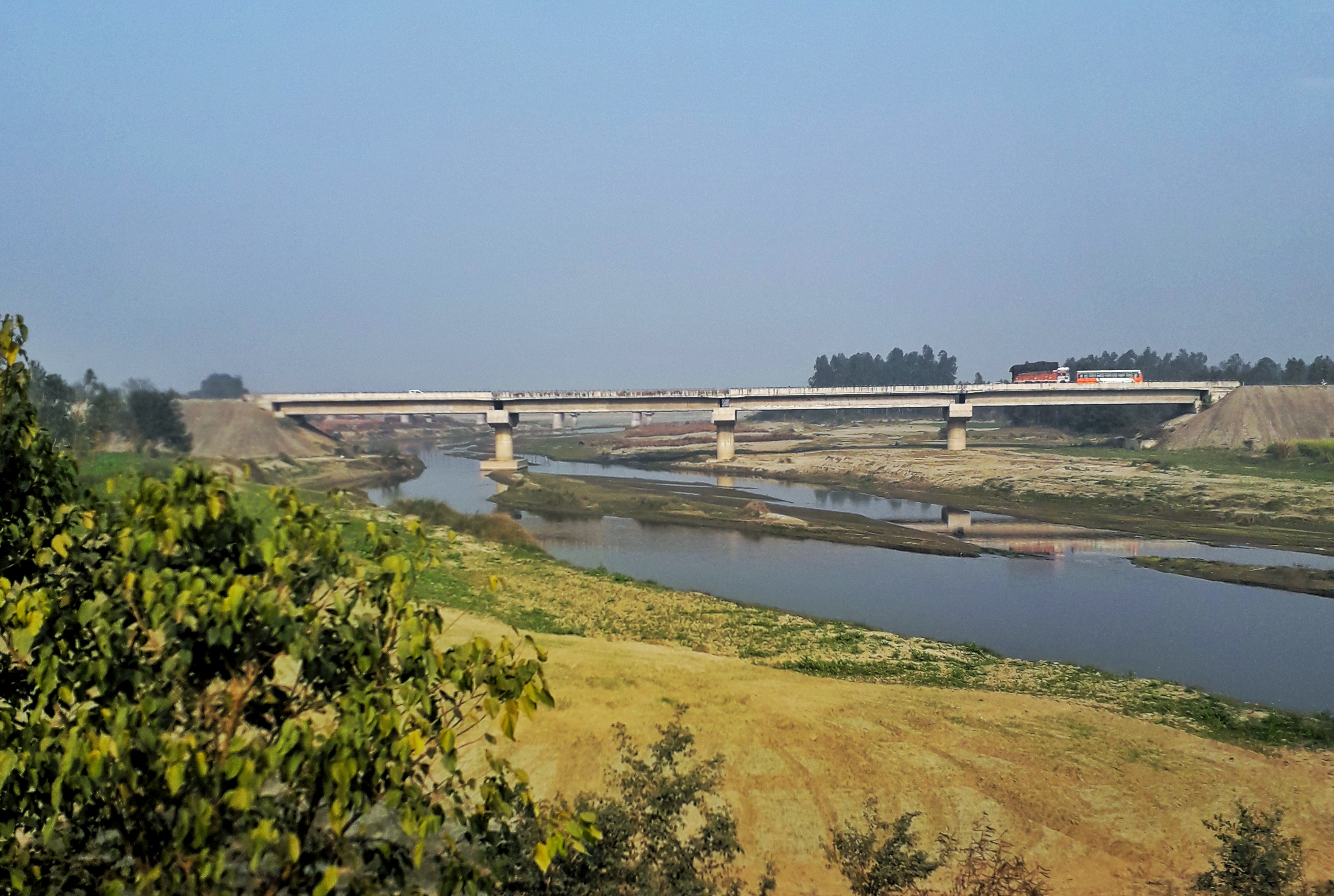
Gaula crossing NH 24 near Bareilly
