= Bilaspur, Madhya Pradesh =

Village in Madhya Pradesh, India

Coordinates: 22°48′08″N 81°32′33″E

Bilaspur is a village in Umaria district, Madhya Pradesh, India. Bilaspur is covered under Anuppur Assembly constituency at state level and Shahdol parliamentary constituency at national level. Bilaspur village is a gram panchayat as per the 2011 Census of India. The village has 250 houses with a population of 1,118 members consisting of 561 males and 557 females. Male literacy is 57.4% and female literacy is 40.04% making an average of 48.75%. Bilaspur is headed by a sarpanch who is elected through local elections.

== Geography ==
Bilaspur is in Umaria District and is 539.45 hectares (1,333.0 acres). It is about 164 km (102 mi) north of Bilaspur, Chhattisgarh.

== Economy ==
Bilaspur is dependent on the nearest town Anuppur located 42 km (26 mi) away for major economic activities.

== Transportation ==
Bilaspur is well connected by public and private buses from nearest towns and the nearest railway station is 10 km (6.2 mi) away.

== See also ==
- Dindori
