= Haldwani railway station =

Indian railway station

Haldwani Railway Station
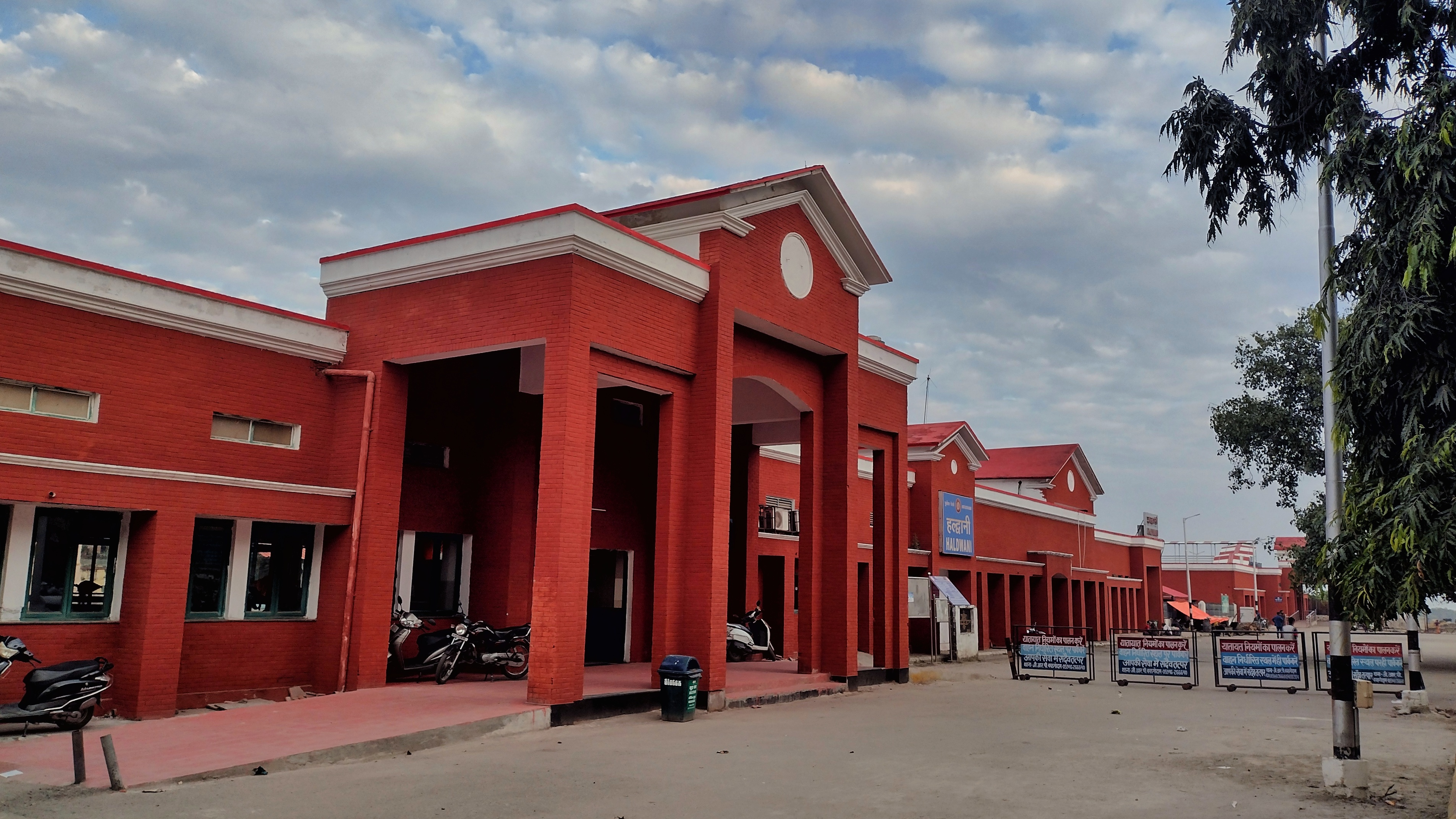
- Haldwani railway station

General information
- Location: NH 87, Haldwani, Uttarakhand; India
- Coordinates: 29.2156°N 79.5333°E
- Elevation: 443 metres (1,453 ft)
- System: Indian Railways station
- Owner: Indian Railways
- Operator: Izzatnagar railway division
- Platforms: 3
- Connections: Auto stand

Construction
- Structure type: At grade
- Parking: yes
- Cycle facilities: yes

Other information
- Status: Functioning
- Station code: HDW
- Zone(s): Northern Eastern Railway
- Division(s): Izzatnagar
- Fare zone: North Eastern Railway
Location

Haldwani railway station is a main railway station located in Haldwani in Nainital district of Uttarakhand State of India.

The station code is HDW and is 99 km from the headquarter of the Izzatnagar railway division of North Eastern Railway Zone of Indian Railways. There are three platforms. The single broad-gauge railway line uses the diesel engines.

It is located at 443m above mean sea level. The nearest airport is Pantnagar Airport at a distance of 28 km.

== Major trains ==
- Uttarakhand Sampark Kranti Express
- New Delhi–Kathgodam Shatabdi Express
- Jammu Tawi–Kathgodam Garib Rath Express
- Kanpur Central–Kathgodam Garib Rath Express
- Lucknow Junction–Kathgodam Express
- Kathgodam Express
- Ranikhet Express
- Bagh Express
- Kathgodam–Moradabad Passenger (via Kashipur)
- Kathgodam–Moradabad Passenger
- Naini–Dun Jan Shatabdi Express Deharadun
