= Kathgodam Express =

Train in India

Overview
- Service type: Express
- Locale: Uttarakhand
- First service: 9 January 2001; 25 years ago
- Current operator: North Central Railway

Route
- Termini: Kathgodam (KGM); Dehradun (DDN)
- Stops: 9
- Distance travelled: 335 km (208 mi)
- Average journey time: 8 hours 25 minutes
- Service frequency: Daily
- Train number: 14119 / 14120

On-board services
- Classes: AC first, AC 2 tier AC 3 tier, Sleeper Class, General Unreserved
- Seating arrangements: Yes
- Sleeping arrangements: Yes
- Catering facilities: E-catering only
- Observation facilities: Large windows
- Baggage facilities: Available
- Other facilities: Below the seats

Technical
- Rolling stock: LHB coach
- Track gauge: 1,676 mm (5 ft 6 in)
- Operating speed: 130 km/h (81 mph) maximum, 40 km/h (25 mph) average including halts.
- Rake sharing: Rake sharing with 14113/14114 Subedarganj-Dehradun Express.

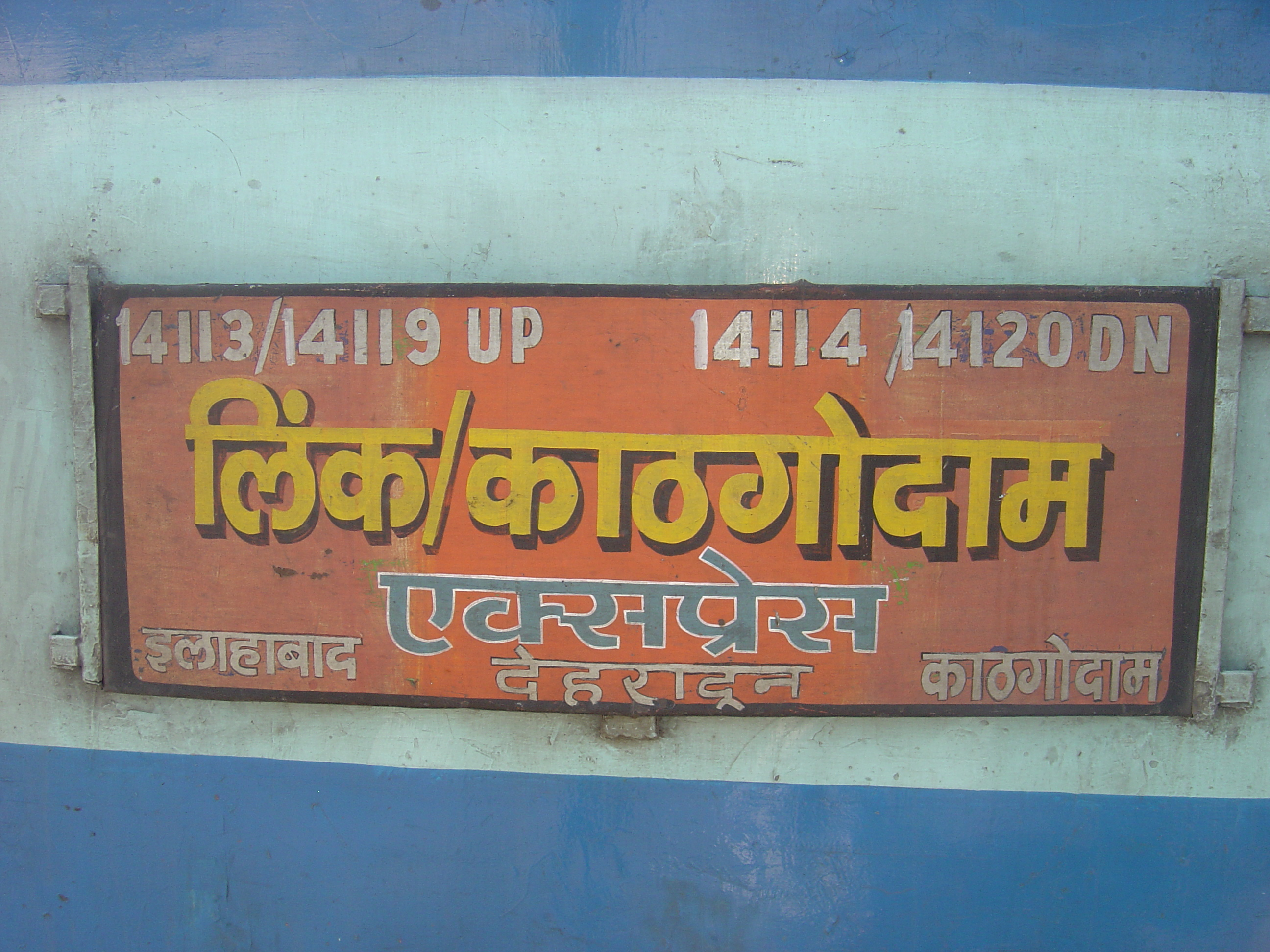
The nameplate of the 14119 Kathgodam Express

The 14119 / 14120 Kathgodam Express is an Express train belonging to Indian Railways that runs between Kathgodam and Dehradun in India. It operates as train number 14119 from Kathgodam and Dehradun and as train number 14120 in the reverse direction.

== Timetable ==
- 14119 Kathgodam Express leaves Kathgodam every day at 19:45 hrs IST and reaches Dehradun at 04:20 hrs IST the next day.
- 14120 Kathgodam Express leaves Dehradun every day at 23:30 hrs IST and reaches Kathgodam at 07:10 hrs IST the next day.

Station code	Station name	14119 – Kathgodam to Dehradun		Distance from source in km	Day	14120 – Dehradun to Kathgodam		Distance from source in km	Day
Station code	Station name	Arrival	Departure	Distance from source in km	Day	Arrival	Departure	Distance from source in km	Day
KGM	Kathgodam	Source	19:45	0	1	07:10	Destination	335	2
HDW	Haldwani	20:01	20:03	7	1	06:48	06:50	329	2
LKU	Lalkuan Junction	20:35	20:40	23	1	06:00	06:10	313	2
HLDD	Haldi Road	20:46	20:48	30	1	05:41	05:43	305	2
RUPC	Rudrapur City	21:02	21:04	45	1	05:03	05:05	291	2
BLQR	Bilaspur Road	21:25	21:27	63	1	04:36	04:38	273	2
RMU	Rampur	22:33	22:38	90	1	04:10	04:15	246	2
MB	Moradabad	23:20	23:30	117	1	03:25	03:35	219	2
NBD	Najibabad Junction	01:10	01:15	215	2	01:35	01:40	121	2
LRJ	Laksar Junction	01:55	02:00	257	2	00:53	00:58	79	2
HW	Haridwar Junction	02:28	02:38	284	2	00:15	00:25	52	2
DDN	Dehradun	04:20	Destination	335	2	Source	23:30	0	1
