= Rampur Junction railway station =

Railway station in Uttar Pradesh, India

Rampur Junction
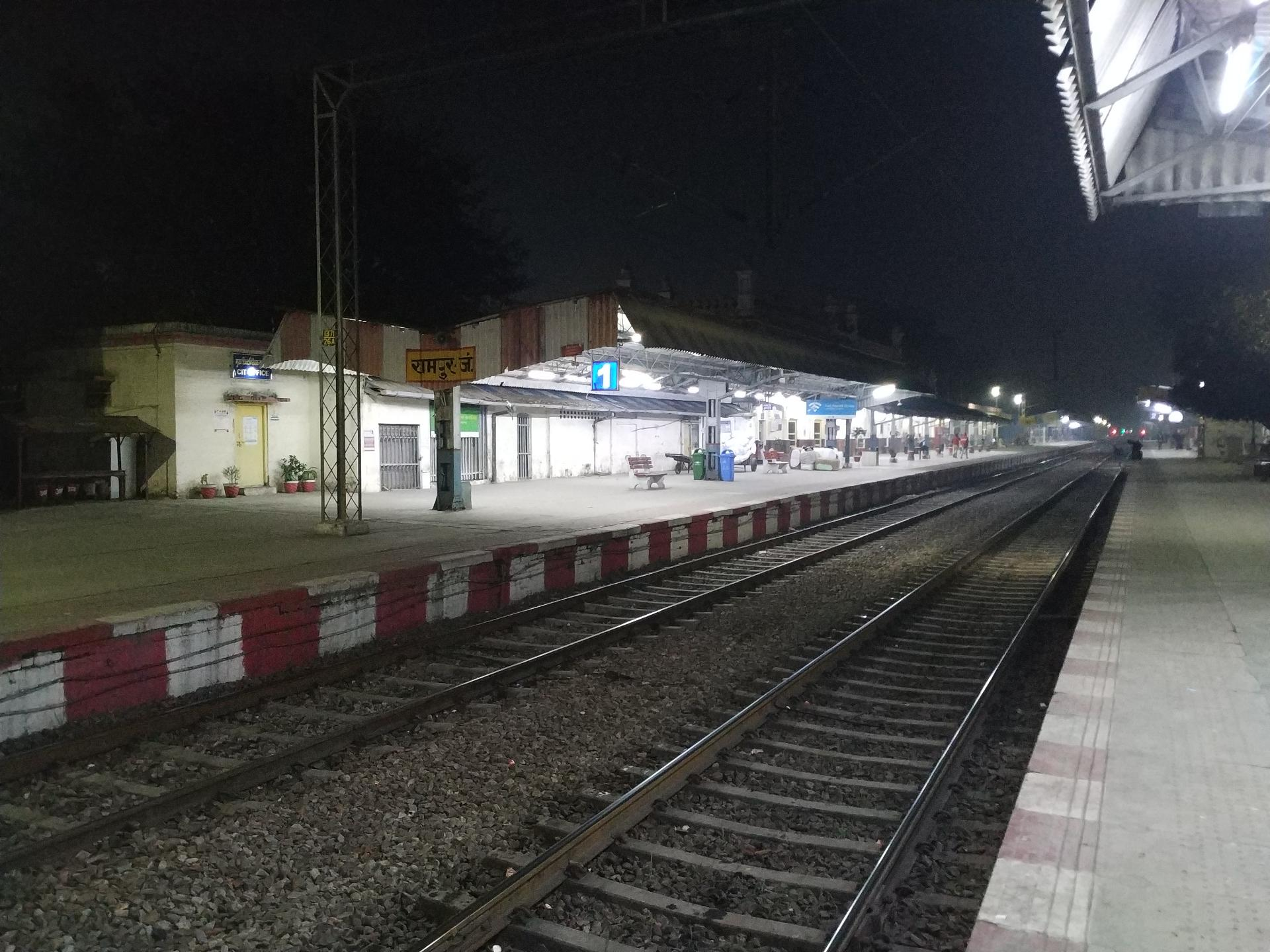
- Rampur Junction railway station

General information
- Location: Rampur, Uttar Pradesh, India
- Coordinates: 28°46′12″N 79°01′23″E
- Elevation: 191 metres (627 ft)
- System: Express train and Passenger train station
- Owner: Indian Railways
- Operator: Northern Railways
- Lines: Lucknow–Moradabad line Rampur–Delhi line Rampur–Kathgodam line
- Platforms: 3
- Tracks: 3
- Connections: Central Bus Station, Taxi Stand, Auto Stand

Construction
- Structure type: At grade
- Parking: Yes
- Cycle facilities: Yes
- Architect: J.H. Hornimen

Other information
- Status: Functioning
- Station code: RMU
- Zone(s): Northern Railway
- Division(s): Moradabad

History
- Opened: 8 June 1894; 132 years ago
- Former names: Oudh and Rohilkhand Railway / East Indian Railway Company

Passengers
- 1,00,000
Location
- Location within Uttar Pradesh Location within India

Rampur Junction railway station (station code RMU) is located in Rampur in Uttar Pradesh.

== History ==
After connecting Varanasi with Lucknow, the Oudh and Rohilkhand Railway started working west of Lucknow. Construction of railway line from Lucknow to Sandila and then on to Hardoi was completed in 1872. The line up to Bareilly was completed in 1873. A line connecting Moradabad to Chandausi was also built in 1872 and it was continued up to Bareilly in 1873. The Bareilly–Moradabad chord was completed in 1894. The former main line became Chandausi loop and the one via Rampur became main line. A branch line linked Chandausi to Aligarh in 1894.

The previous Oudh & Rohilkhand Railway's main line ran from Lucknow to Saharanpur via Shahjahanpur, Bareilly, Chandausi and Moradabad. The Bareilly–Moradabad Chord via Rampur, approved on 4 December 1891, was opened on 8 June 1894. On 1 December the main line was officially diverted to the Chord shortening the overall distance from Lucknow to Saharanpur by 14.42 miles. The former main line became the Chandausi Loop with a branch line to Aligarh Junction and a local branch line.

== Line and location ==
It lies on the Lucknow–Moradabad line and junction point of Kathgodam railway line which work under NER. The station is served by the Northern Railways. Moradabad railway station is 30 km (19 mi) to the west of Rampur. Going south-east, Bareilly railway station is the nearest major station. The electrification of railway lines of Rampur junction is completed.

== Gallery ==
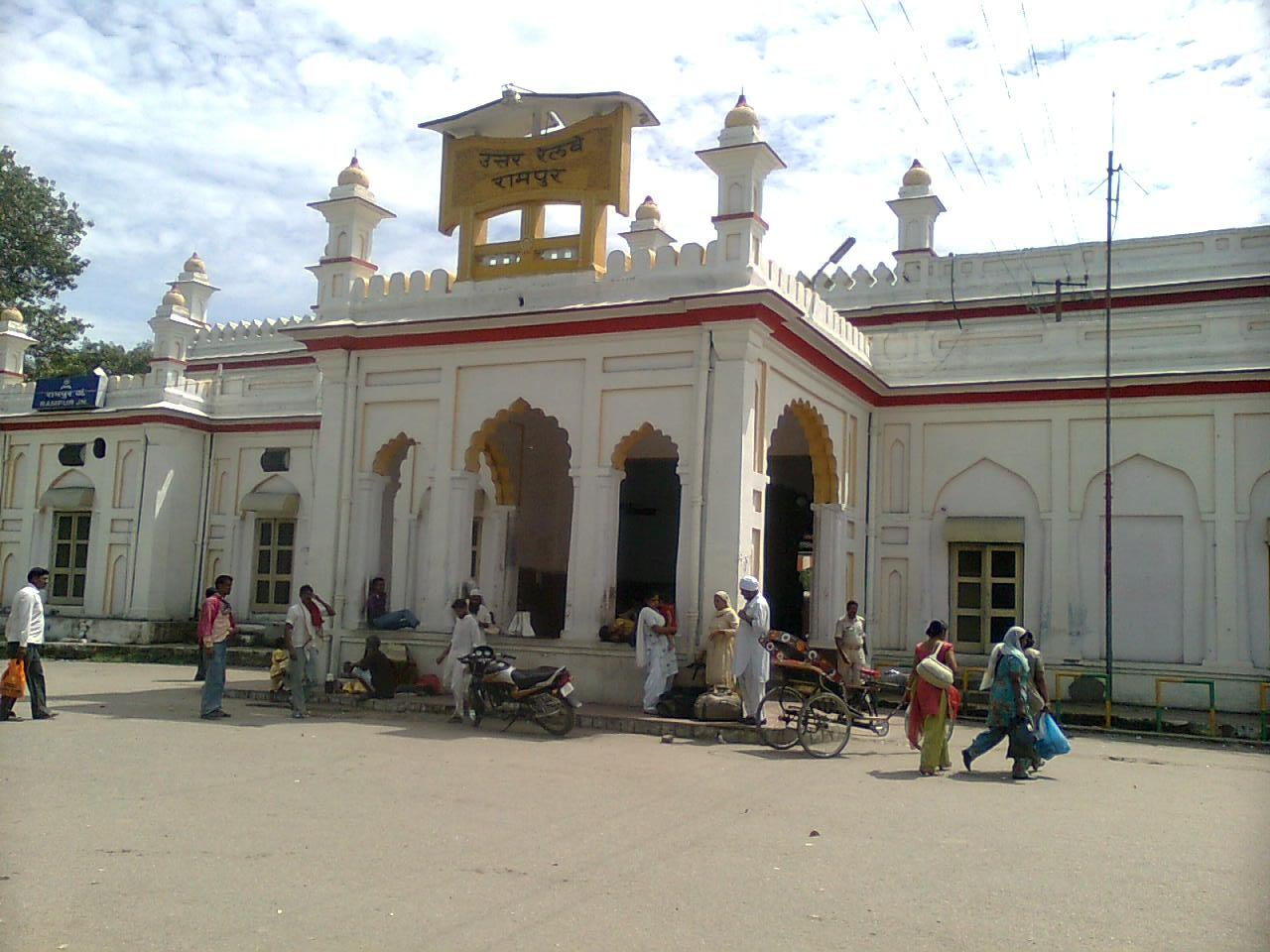
Rampur Railway Station front view
