= Kathgodam railway station =

Railway station in Uttarakhand, India

Kathgodam Railway Station
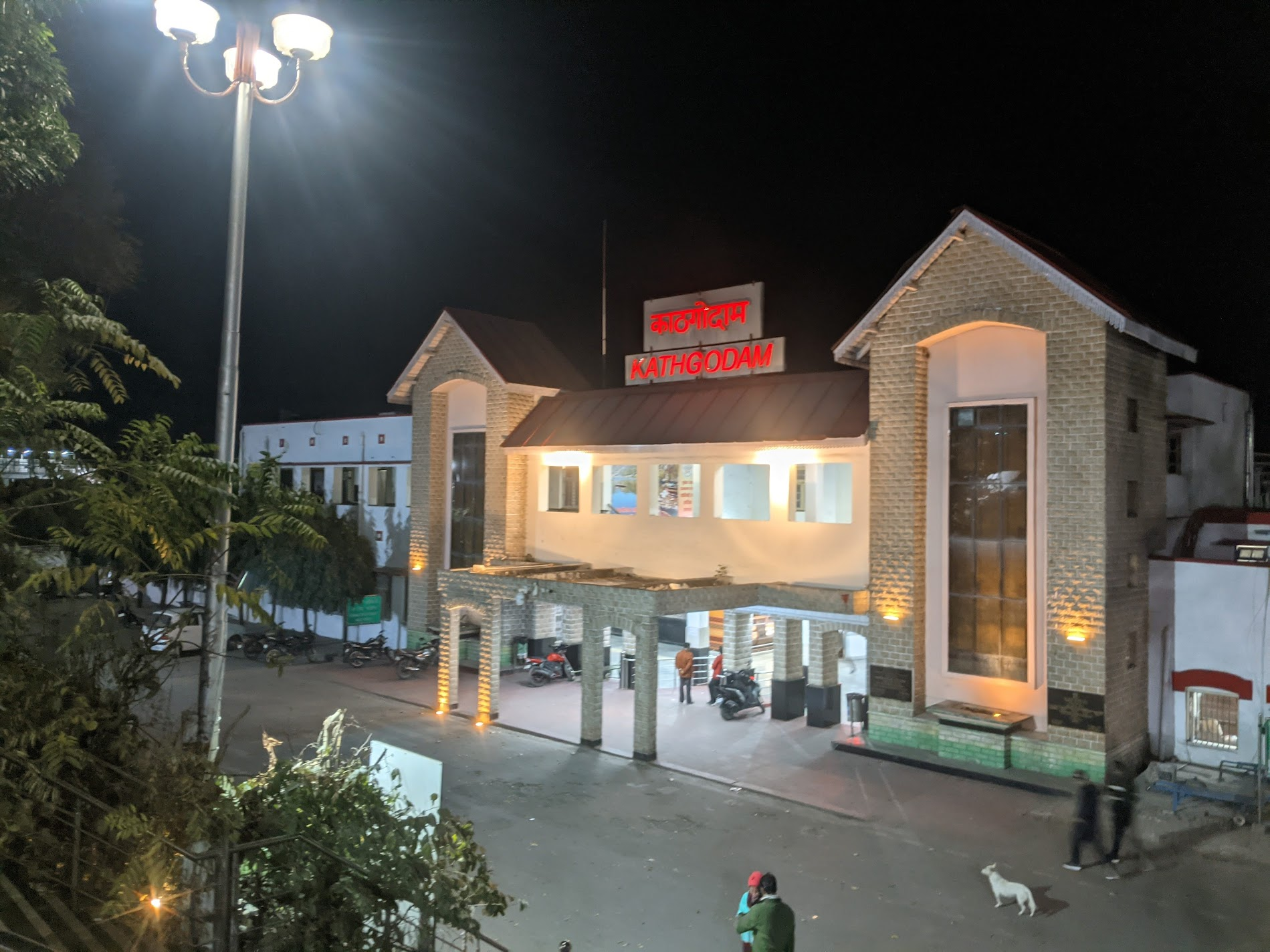
- Kathgodam railway station in night view.

General information
- Location: NH 87, Kathgodam, Nainital district, Uttarakhand; India
- Coordinates: 29.2666°N 79.5467°E
- Elevation: 518 metres (1,699 ft)
- System: Indian Railways station
- Owner: Indian Railways
- Operator: North Eastern Railways
- Platforms: 3
- Tracks: 6
- Connections: Auto stand

Construction
- Structure type: At grade
- Parking: Yes
- Cycle facilities: Yes
- Architectural style: British

Other information
- Status: Functioning
- Station code: KGM
- Zone(s): North Eastern Railway
- Division(s): Izzatnagar

History
- Opened: 1884; 142 years ago
Location
- Location within Uttarakhand Location within India

Kathgodam railway station (station code: KGM) is railway station located in Kathgodam town near Haldwani, just 35 km from Nainital Town in Nainital district of Uttarakhand State of India.

The station code is KGM and is 101 km from the headquarters of the Izzatnagar railway division of North Eastern Railway zone of Indian Railways. There are four platforms. A single broad-gauge railway line serves diesel trains.

== Location ==
The railway station is located in Kathgodam city at the foot of Sivalik Hills at a distance of 35 km from Nainital. It is located at 625 m above mean sea level. The nearest airport is Pantnagar Airport at the distance of 33 km.

Kathgodam railway station is linked by roads to inner Himalayan region of Kumaon. It is connected to Nainital via Jeolikote, which is connected to Almora, Ranikhet, Baijnath, Gwaldam, Bageshwar and further eastwards to Pithoragarh.

== History ==
By the end of 19th century, Kathgodam formed one end of the 66-mile-long Rohilkund and Kumaon Railway, a private line that connected Kathgodam to Bareilly. The Rohilkund and Kumaon Railway was transferred to the Government of India and merged into the Oudh and Tirhut Railway on 1 January 1943. On 14 April 1952, the Oudh and Tirhut Railway was amalgamated with the Assam Railway and the Kanpur–Achnera section of the Bombay, Baroda and Central India Railway to form North Eastern Railway, one of the 16 zones of the current Indian Railways.

== Services ==
Trains that ply for Kathgodam are New Delhi–Kathgodam Shatabdi Express, Lucknow Junction–Kathgodam Express, Kathgodam Express, Ranikhet Express, Uttarakhand Sampark Kranti Express, Bagh Express. Metre-gauge trains like the Kumaon Express from Kathgodam to Agra Fort & Nainital Express from Kathgodam to Lucknow Junction are now permanently withdrawn & are slated to start once gauge conversion is fully completed.

== Accident ==
On 29 April 1953, at about 21:40 hours, 307 Dn. NainiTal Express from Kathgodam derailed between Kichcha and Baheri stations on the Kathgodam–Bareilly single line section of the North Eastern Railway. The train engine and the four coaches behind it capsized and the following three coaches derailed and the last four coaches remained on the line.

== Gallery ==
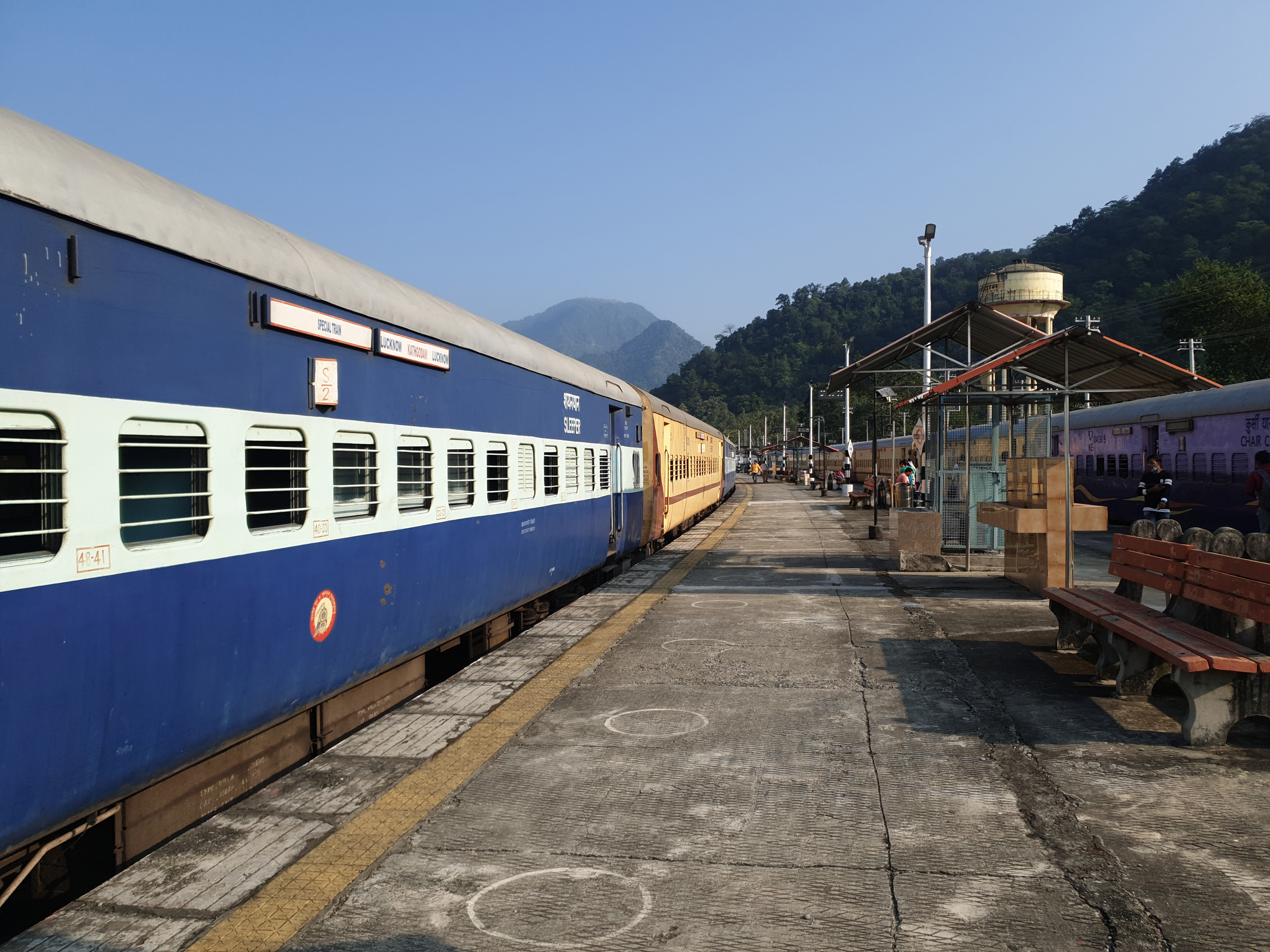
Kathgodam Railway Station Platform 2 and 3

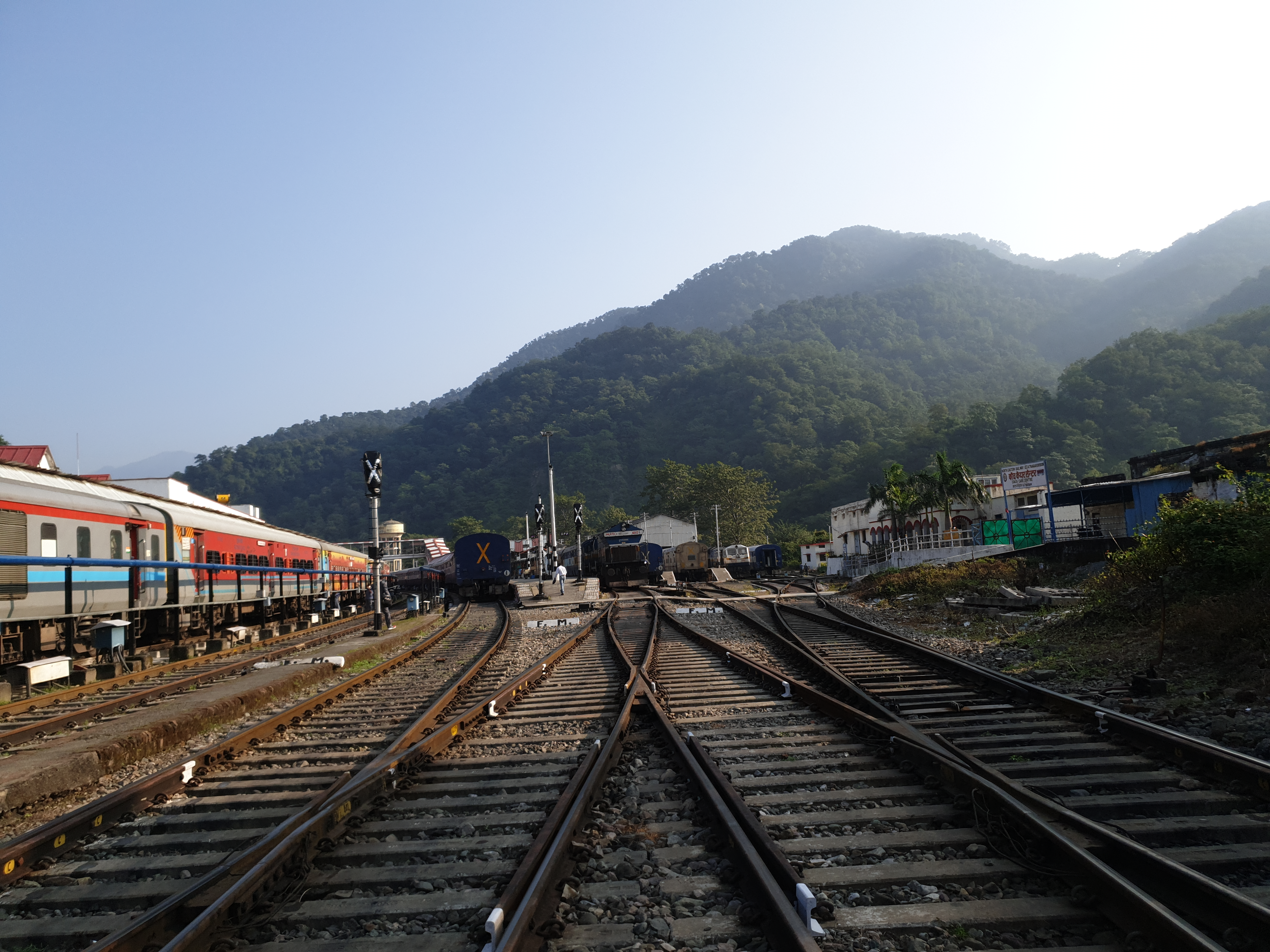
Kathgodam Railway Station

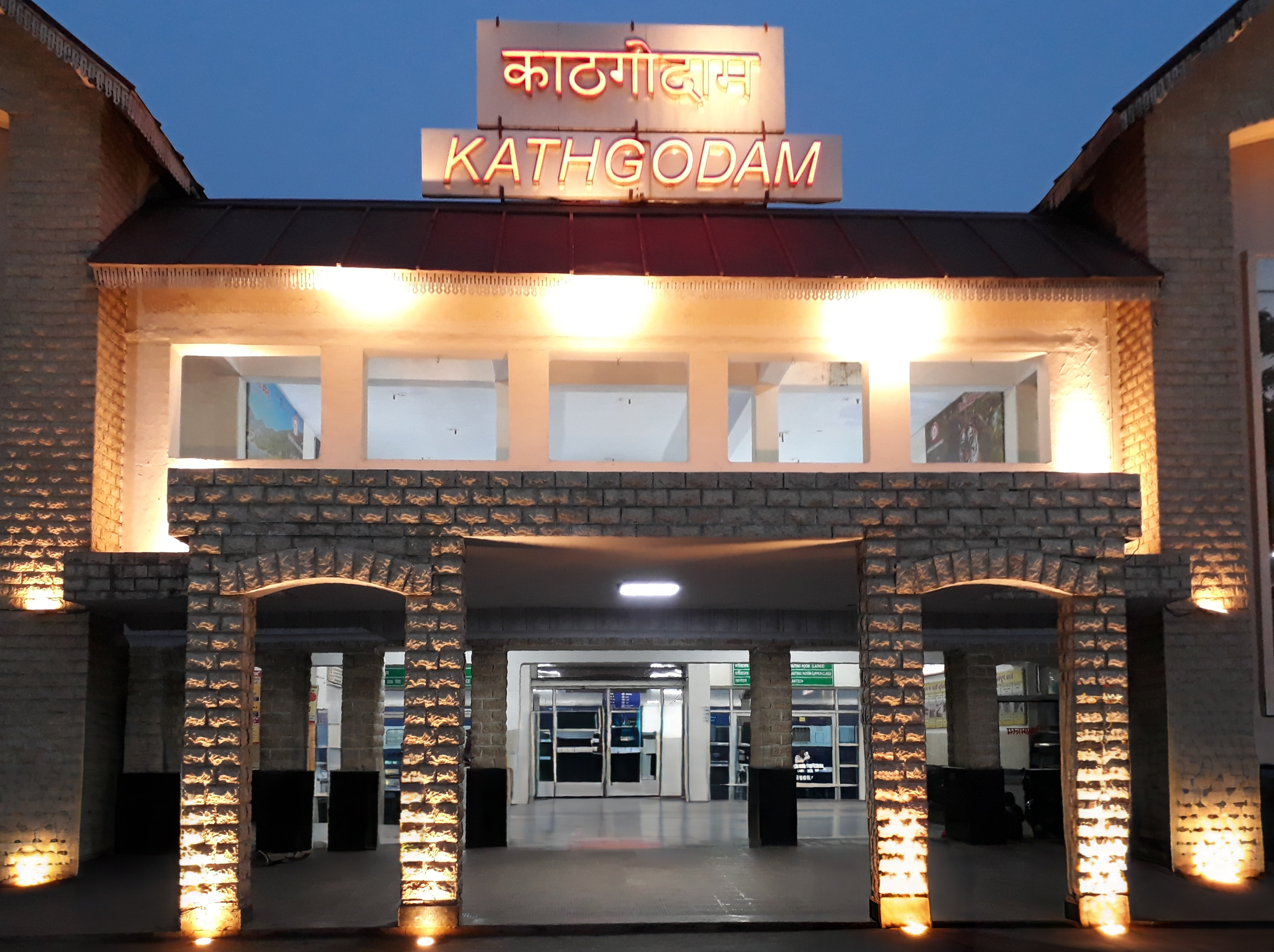
Kathgodam (KGM) railway station

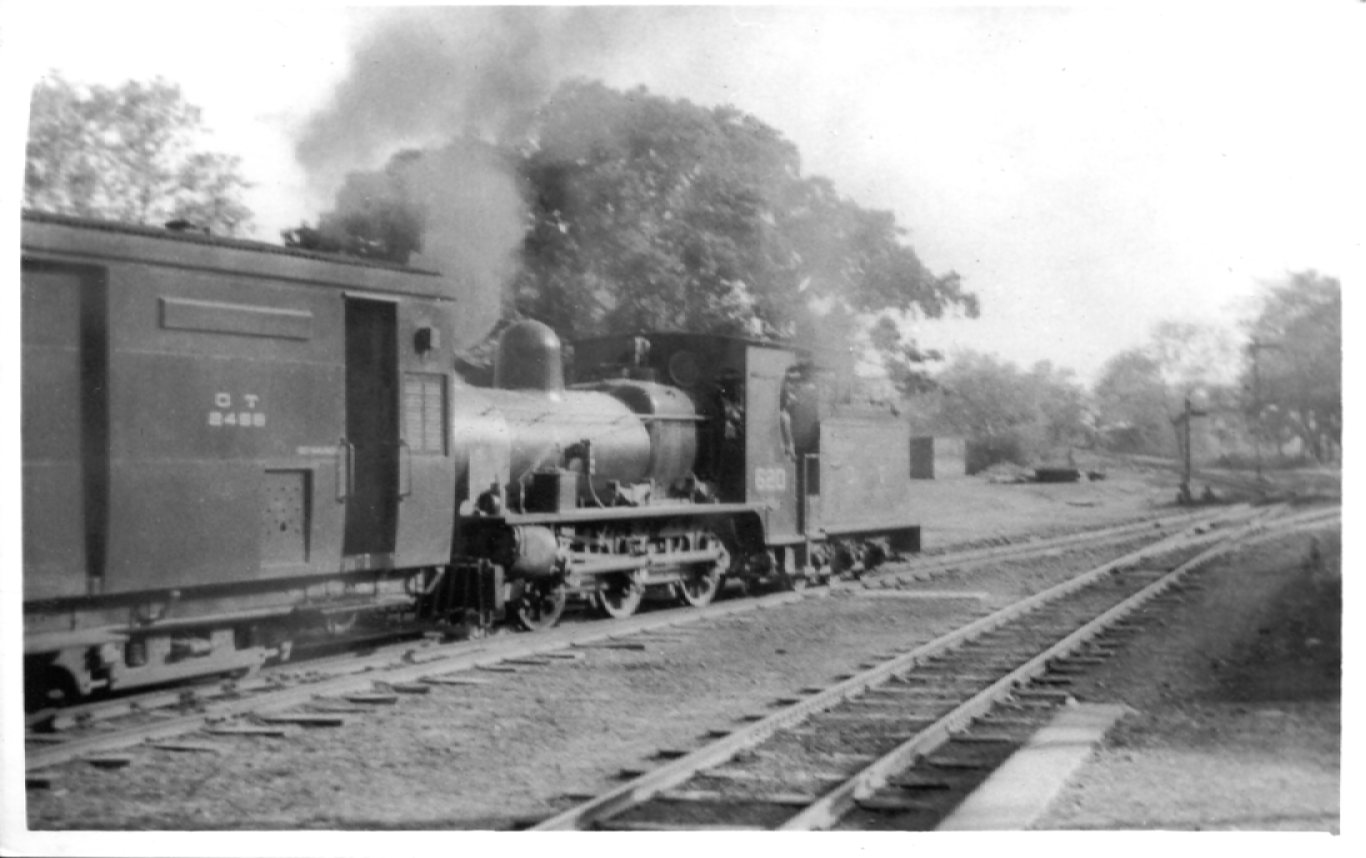
Oudh-Tirhut Railway locomotive at Kathgodam station, 1947.
