= Kathgodam =

- Town
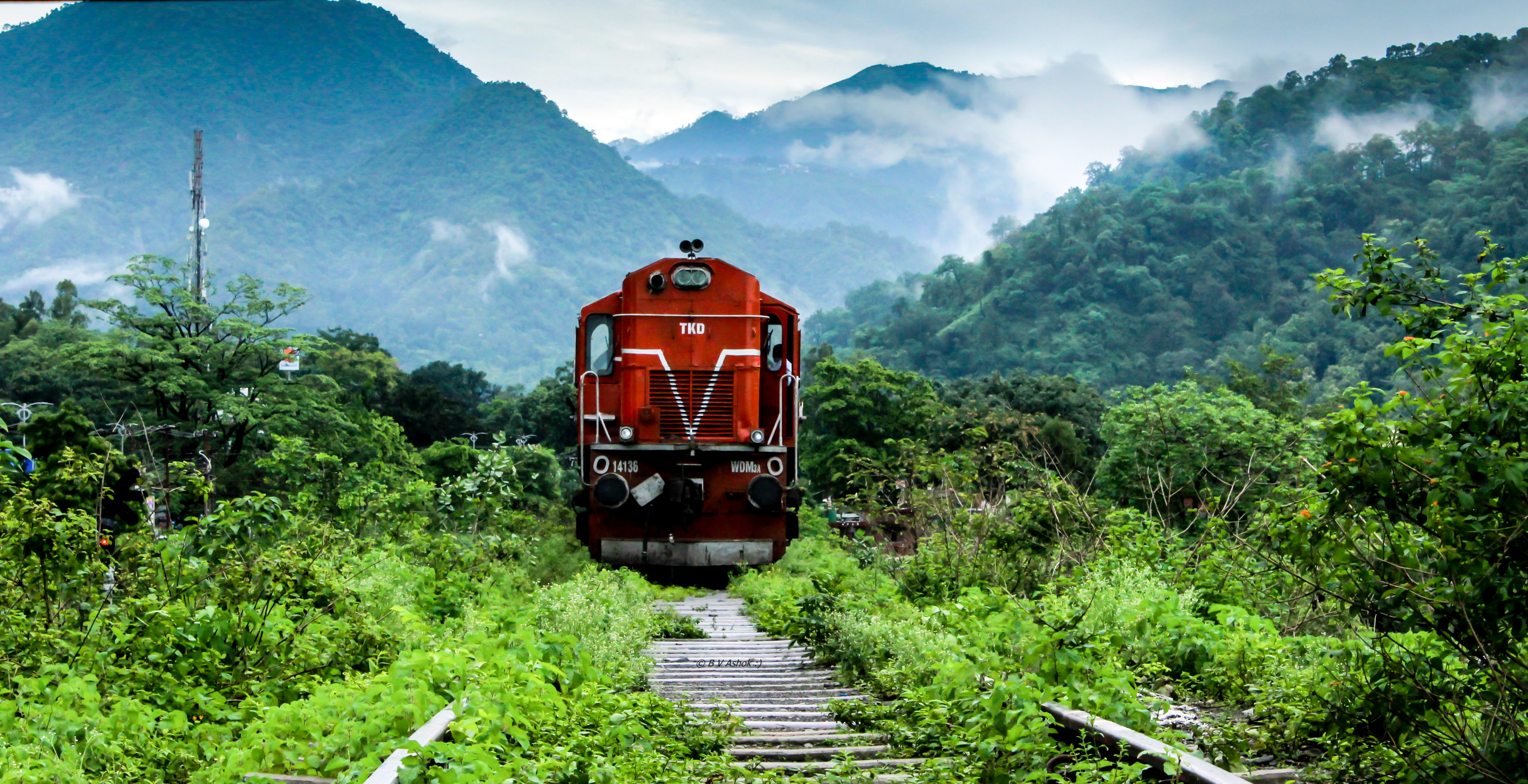
- Kathgodam Express near Kathgodam Railway Station

- Location in Uttarakhand, India Kathgodam (India)
- Coordinates: 29.268°N 79.545°E
- Country: India
- State: Uttarakhand
- District: Nainital
- Elevation: 554 m (1,818 ft)

Population (2011)
  - Total: 129,140
- Vehicle registration: UK-04

Kathgodam is a suburb of Haldwani urban area of Nainital district in the Indian state of Uttarakhand. Situated on the banks of the Gaula river at the foothills of the Kumaon Himalayas, it forms part of the Haldwani–Kathgodam urban area. It is administered by the Haldwani–Kathgodam Municipal Corporation.

The name Kathgodam literally means "timber depot", reflecting its historical role in the forest economy of the Kumaon hills. Its development accelerated after the Rohilkund and Kumaon Railway was extended from Haldwani to Kathgodam in 1884. Located at the transition between the Indo-Gangetic Plain and the Kumaon hills, Kathgodam subsequently developed as an important transport interchange and serves as the "Gateway to Kumaon". Kathgodam railway station, a railway terminus, serves as a major railhead for destinations in Kumaon, including Nainital, Ranikhet and Almora.

== History ==
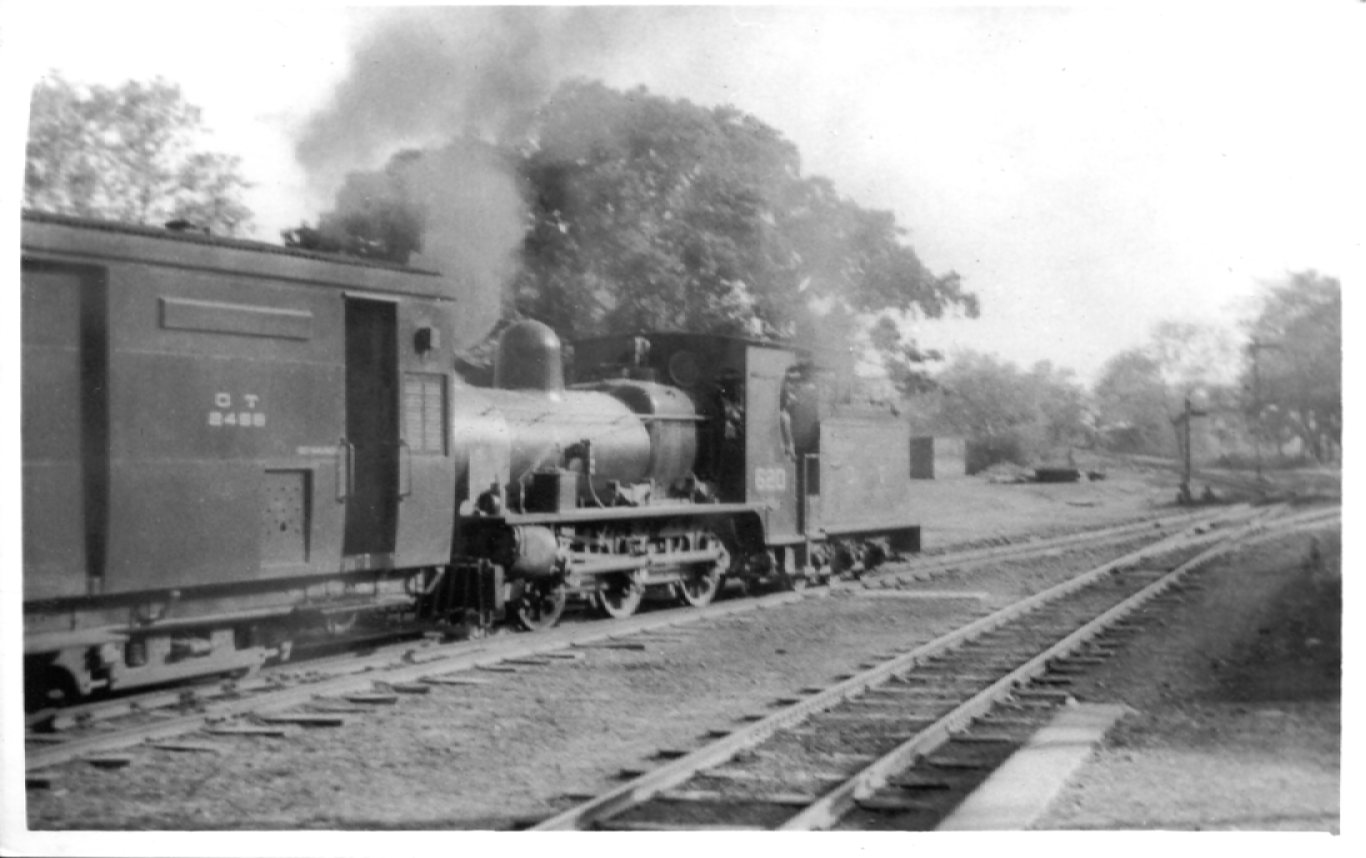
A Oudh and Tirhut Railway locomotive, at Kathgodam station, 1947

The name Kathgodam literally means "timber depot" (Kath-Godam), it has long been associated with forest economy of Kumaon hills, as it was one of the points from where forest products like tibre, catechu, resin and fibre, were exported from hills. It remained a small settlement of the left bank of Gaula River, till the end of 19th century. The 1901 census recorded it as a village with only 375 inhabitants.

During British Raj, Kathgodam was situated of the main road connecting Nainital, then summer capital of the United Province, with Haldwani and Bareilly. However its development started after the arrival railways, when the Rohilkund and Kumaon Railway was extended from Haldwani to Kathgodam on 29 October 1884, and with this Kathgodam railway station became a terminus station on its Indian Railways line. This transformed Kathgodam into an interchange between rail transport from the Indo-Gangetic Plains of North India and road transport into the Kumaon hills towards Nainital, Ranikhet and Almora. It now also served as an important junction in the regional postal network, as Imperial mail routes ran from Kathgodam to Almora and Ranikhet, while mail between Kathgodam, Bareilly and the plains was carried by railway; most other postal transmission in the district was then undertaken by foot-runners.

== Administration ==
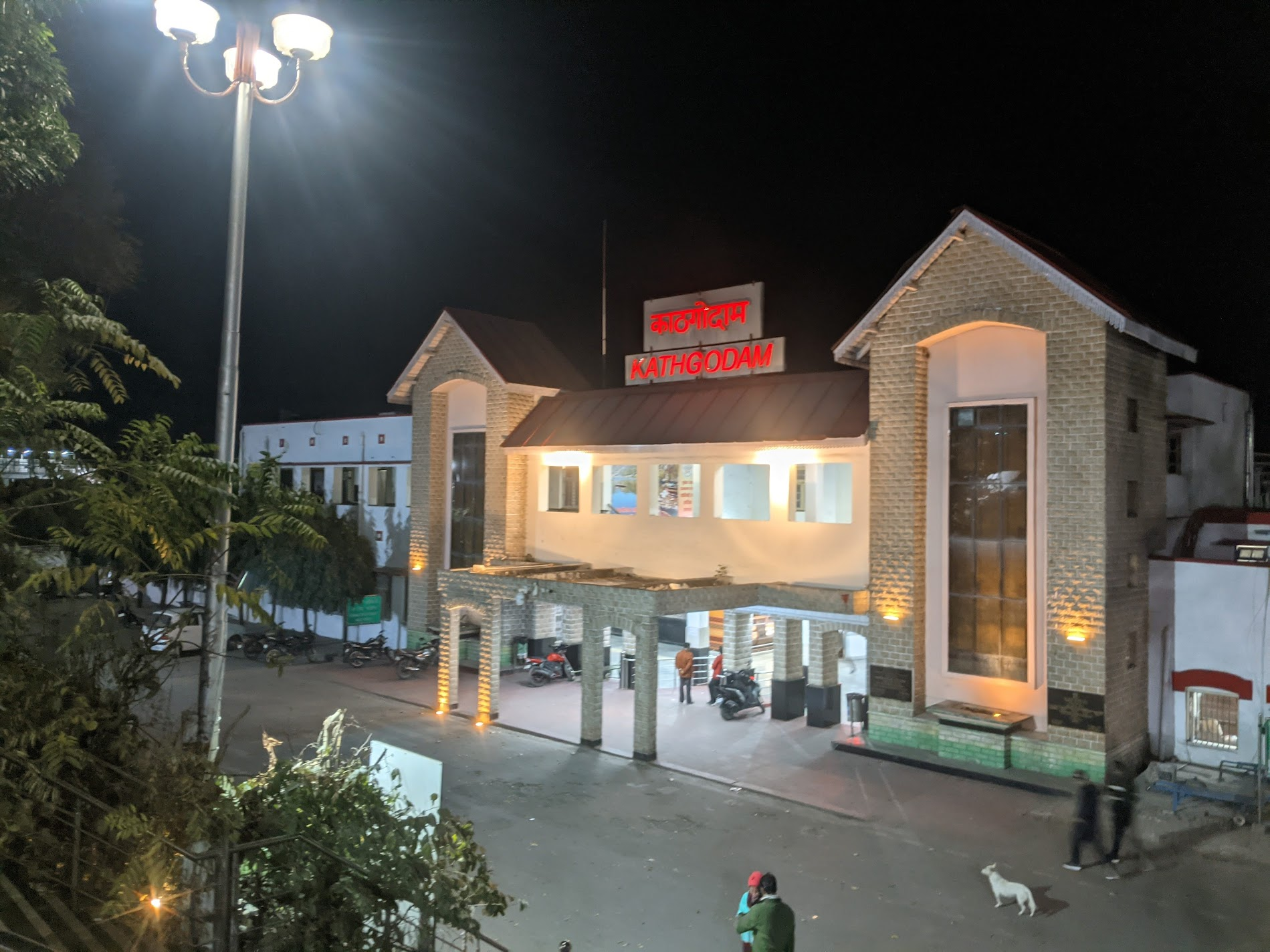
Kathgodam railway station.

At the beginning of the twentieth century, Kathgodam and neighbouring Ranibagh were administered together as a single township under Act XX of 1856. Subsequently, due urban expansion, Kathgodam was administratively incorporated with neighbouring town Haldwani, and the Haldwani–Kathgodam Municipal Council was established on 21 September 1942. They are now together administered by the Haldwani Municipal Corporation.

== Geography ==
Kathgodam is located at 29.27°N 79.53°E. It has an average elevation of 554 metres (1,483 feet). It is situated on the banks of the Gaula river.

== Demographics ==
Religions in kathgodam
Religion	Percent
Hindus	70%
Muslims	27%
Jains	0.7%
Others†	2.3%
Distribution of religions †Includes Sikhs (0.2%), Buddhists (<0.2%).

As per provisional data of 2011 census Haldwani-cum-Kathgodam urban agglomeration had a population of 252,060, out of which males were 121,363 and females were 110,697. The literacy rate was 85.17 per cent.

== Education ==
Kumaun Institute of Information Technology, which is approved by the state government and is affiliated with Kumaun University, is located in the suburbs.

== See also ==
- Bhimtal
- Kainchi Dham
- List of cities in Uttarakhand by population
