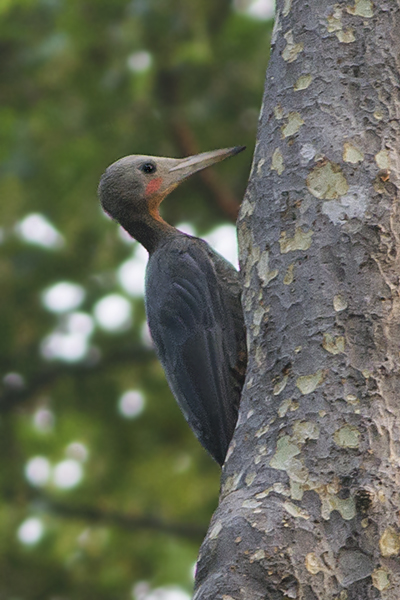
- Mulleripicus pulverulentus mohun (♂) from the lower Himalayas of Kaladhungi, Uttarakhand, India

Conservation status
- Vulnerable (IUCN 3.1)

Scientific classification
- Kingdom: Animalia
- Phylum: Chordata
- Class: Aves
- Order: Piciformes
- Family: Picidae
- Genus: Mulleripicus
- Species: M. pulverulentus

Binomial name
- Mulleripicus pulverulentus (Temminck, 1826)
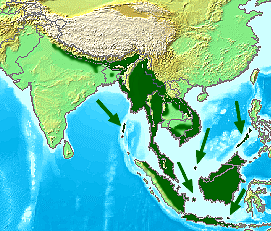

= Great slaty woodpecker =

Species of bird

The great slaty woodpecker (Mulleripicus pulverulentus) is a species of bird in the family Picidae. It is found across the Indian subcontinent and Southeast Asia. A unique and basically unmistakable bird, it is the largest confirmed living woodpecker species, behind the likely extinct imperial woodpecker and ivory-billed woodpecker.

== Range ==
It is found in the Indian subcontinent and Southeast Asia, ranging across Bangladesh, Bhutan, Brunei, Cambodia, India, Indonesia, Laos, Malaysia, Myanmar, Nepal, the Philippines, Singapore, Thailand and Vietnam. It is found in the Greater Sundas, but it does not inhabit Bali.

== Habitat ==
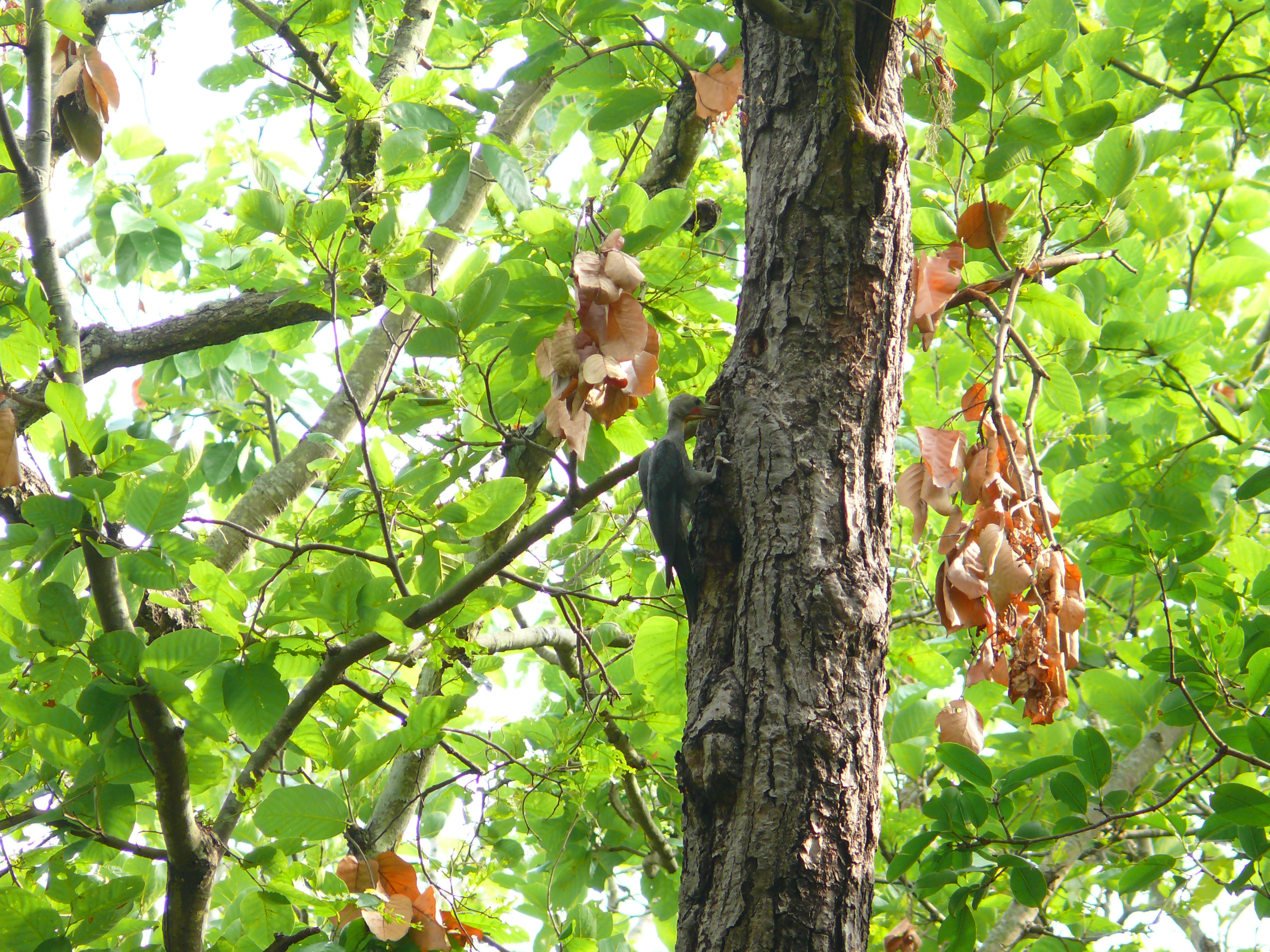
The great slaty woodpecker is dependent on dense, old-growth forest, particularly broadleaf forests.

This species prefers to inhabit areas of primary semi-open, moist deciduous and tropical evergreen forest though can on occasion range into adjacent secondary forests, clearings with scattered tall trees and similar almost park-like areas but do not generally visit heavily disturbed areas. Locally, the great slaty woodpecker prefers sprawling stands of dipterocarp and teak trees. Also found in mature sal forests, swamp forest and mangroves with tall, mature trees. The species usually occurs below an elevation of 600 m (2,000 ft), but also locally in montane areas of up to 1,100 m (3,600 ft), occasionally ranging up to 2,000 m (6,600 ft).

== Description ==
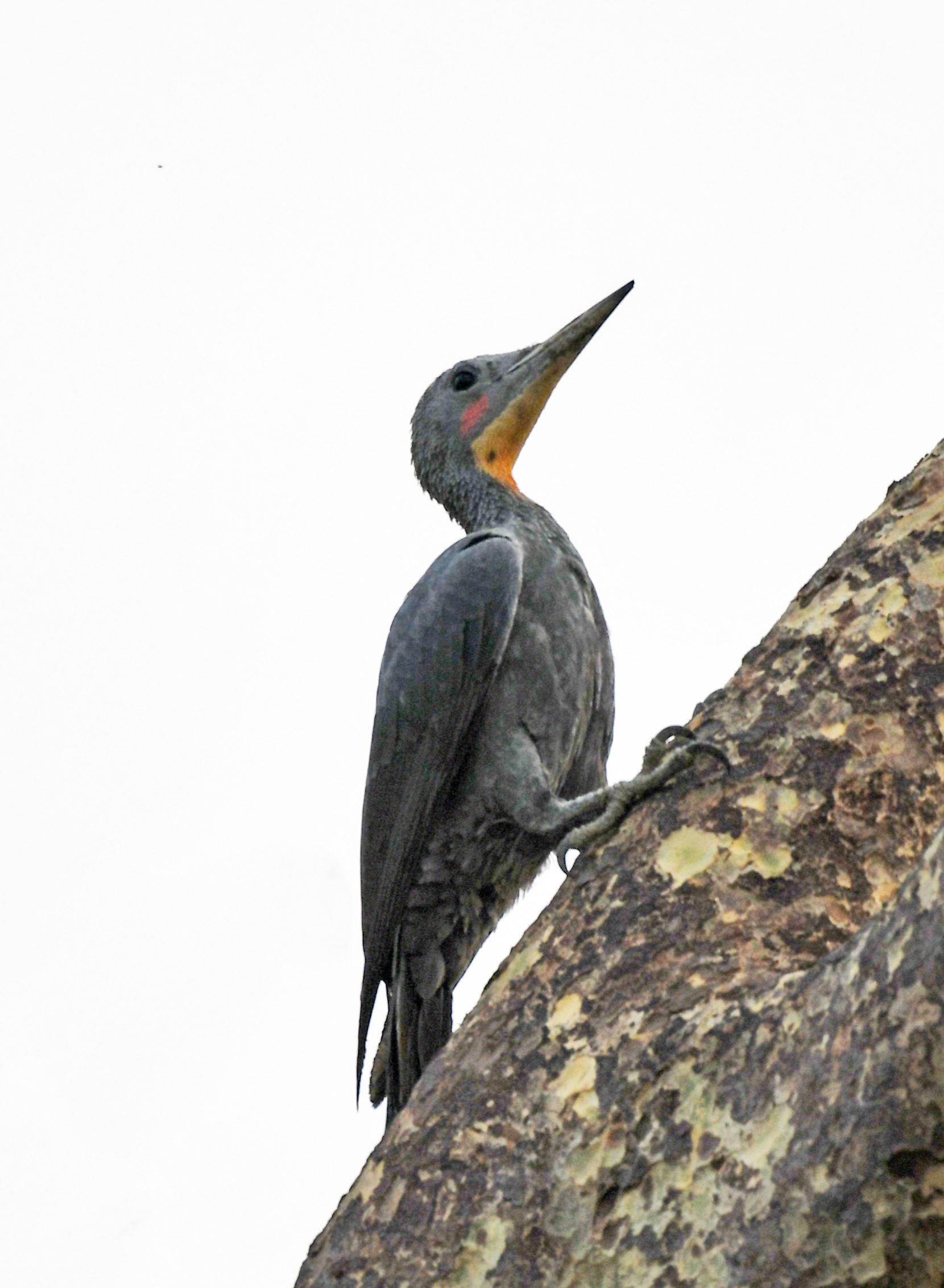
Great slaty woodpeckers are one of the largest woodpeckers and the largest species certain to exist.

With the probable extinctions of the imperial and ivory-billed woodpeckers, this species, at 45–55 cm (18–22 in) long and a weight of 360–563 g (0.794–1.241 lb), is the largest woodpecker in the world, though the northern Eurasian black woodpecker is nearly as large with some overlap in size. The average weight was claimed in one study as 430 g (15 oz). Among standard measurements, the wing chord is 21.5 to 25 cm (8.5 to 9.8 in), the tail is 13.4 to 16.2 cm (5.3 to 6.4 in), the bill is 6 to 6.5 cm (2.4 to 2.6 in) and the tarsus is 3.6 to 4.1 cm (1.4 to 1.6 in). This unique-looking woodpecker has several obvious distinctive features, with a very long, strong chisel-tipped bill, an elongated neck, and a long tail. A slight crest may occasionally be evident. The plumage is almost entirely dark grey or blackish slate-grey, overlaid with small white spots on the head and neck. The throat is paler grey to yellowish, and males have small red moustache. The size and structure readily distinguish this bird from almost any other species, including other woodpeckers. Occasionally, at first glance, the great slaty woodpecker is mistaken for a hornbill but, obviously, such a resemblance is slight at best.

For a bird of such great size, the great slaty woodpecker has a weak, quiet voice, especially compared to other large woodpeckers, which tend to have loud, booming voices. The species call is a whinnying cackle of 2 to 5, usually 4 notes, woikwoikwoikwoik, the initial being higher in pitched and the middle note being distinctly lower. Single dwot calls, variable in sound, strength and duration, are sometimes given while perched or in flight. Breeding pairs of these woodpeckers have been heard to softly mew at each other. In more antagonistic situations, sharp taw-whit or dew-it calls are uttered while the birds swing their heads back and forth.

=== Subspecies ===
Three subspecies are accepted:

- Mulleripicus pulverulentus mohun Ripley, SD, 1950 — northern India and Nepal to northern Arunachal Pradesh
- Mulleripicus pulverulentus harterti Hesse, E, 1911 — northeastern India south of the Brahmaputra River, to northern Myanmar, southwestern China, and Indochina
- Mulleripicus pulverulentus pulverulentus (Temminck, CJ, 1826) — Malay Peninsula to Sumatra, Java, Borneo, and Palawan group

Normally, the nominate subspecies is the darkest, most slaty grey race. M. p. harterti has a more pale throat with a greater amount of whitish feather tips forming small spot and is slightly paler below than the nominate, sometimes appearing almost whitish on the belly.

== Ecology ==
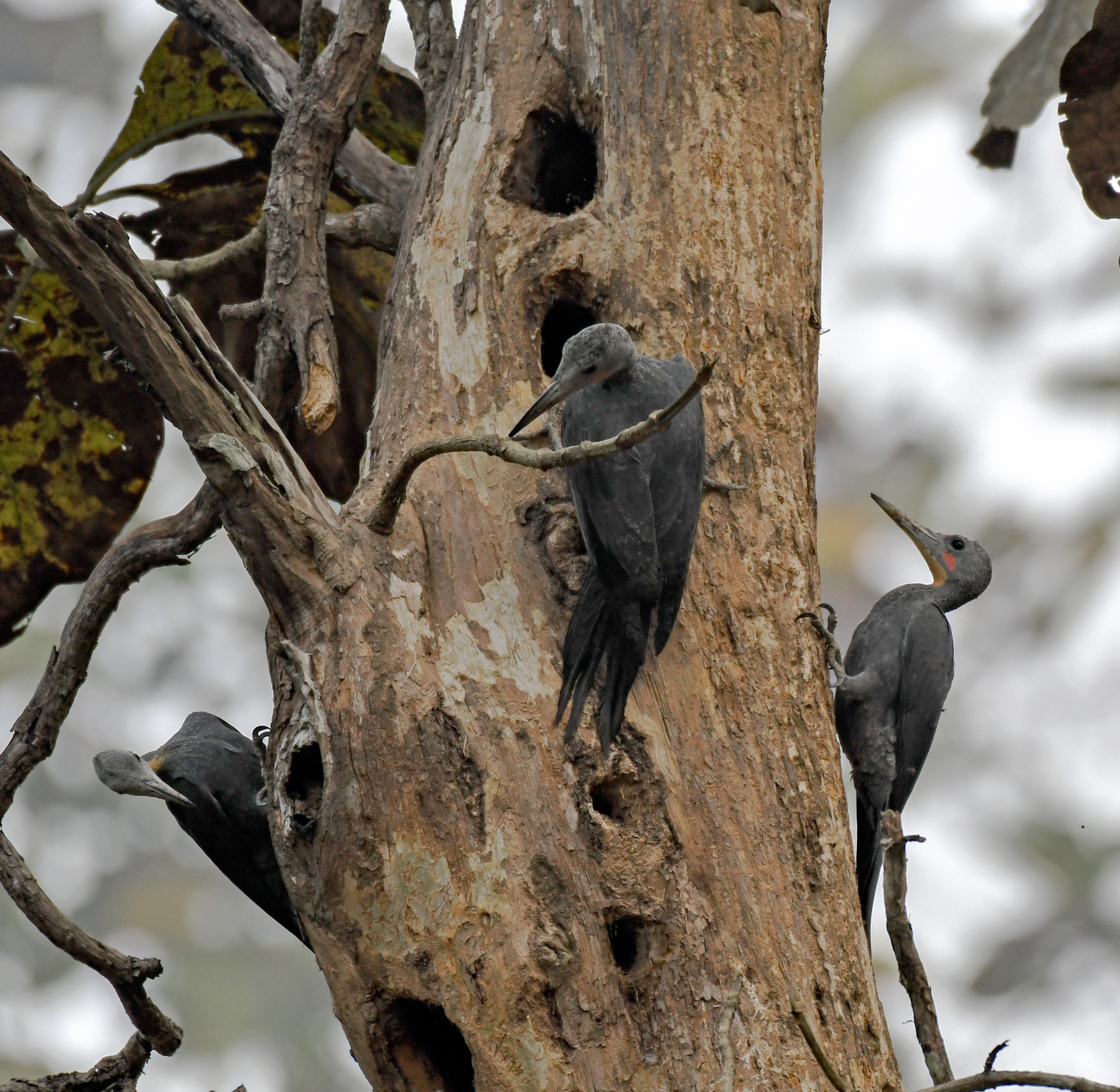
The great slaty woodpecker is somewhat unusual for its habit of traveling in foraging groups.

Great slaty woodpeckers are mostly seen in groups consisting of 3 to 6 individuals, which consist of a breeding pair and their young from prior years. Groups often forage on shared feeding sites in the form of nests of social insects such as ants, termites, wood-boring beetles and stingless bees. Ants seem to be generally favoured in the diet, though larvae of other species may be eaten quite regularly as well. Occasionally, small fruit may supplement the diet. Females spend more time searching for feeding sources and males, which have slightly larger bills, spend more time opening the sources. Preferred feeding sources are mostly found in large branches or trunks of large, living trees. The groups will travel considerable distance to access these trees and, as such, the home ranges of the species are quite large. Occasionally, though, they will feed at lower levels in trees and even amongst saplings. Usually, feeding groups of these woodpeckers do not linger in any given area for long. Sometimes this species associates with slightly smaller white-bellied woodpeckers and considerably smaller greater flamebacks; the foraging methods of these very different woodpeckers minimise competition between the species. Perhaps more marked competition for food sources generally comes in the form of hornbills and arboreal (or tree-dwelling) mammals. The great slaty woodpecker usually works a tree upwards and, though capable of swifter movements, has been described while foraging as if moving in "slow motion". It forages by gleaning, probing, pecking, prising off bark and hammering with powerful and loud blows to excavate the wood. Gleaning is the most important foraging method for the species, with the long neck and bill allowing it to reach out over a considerable distance into the cracks and crevices of trees. This species often flies high over the trees for long distances between successful foraging patches. In flight, its feather rustle noisily. The great slaty woodpecker usually engages in less dipping than other woodpeckers and flies in a mixed flying style described as quite crow-like.

Like all woodpeckers, breeding pairs roost in separate tree holes but regularly call to stay in contact. The pair bond appears to be lifelong. These woodpeckers engage in displays, largely for territorial purposes. Displays include head-swinging, where the appears to lag behind the body in swinging movements, whinnying calls and widen their wings and tail considerably. Few nests of the species have been described in detail, but at least occasionally nests are raised cooperatively by groups. Known nests, at anywhere from 9 to 45 m (30 to 148 ft) in height in the trees, are located in very large trees. When excavating the nest hole, both parents participate but reportedly the male does the majority of the work. The nest hole entrance will be around 10 cm (3.9 in) across, but much wider inside the tree. The pair will only use a nest from a prior year if competition is too overbearing for a newly constructed hole. The nesting season, in Malaysia at least, appears to be from March to August. The clutch reportedly consists of two to four eggs, which are incubated by both parents. Both parents also feed and generally brood the young. The young great slaty woodpeckers probably stay with their parents until the next breeding season.

== Status ==
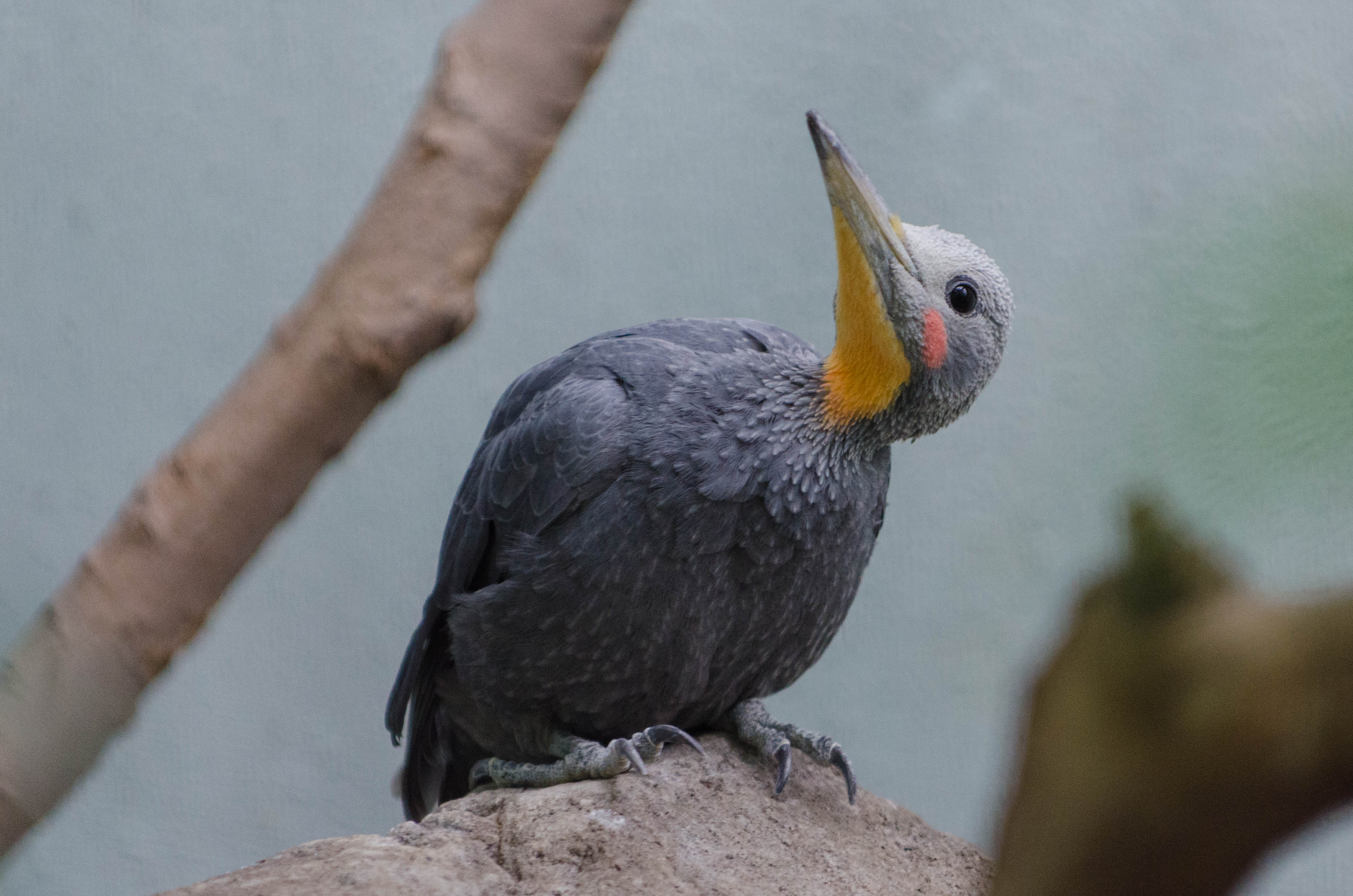
Like many forest birds of South and Southeast Asia, the great slaty woodpecker is declining due to deforestation and is thus now considered Vulnerable to extinction by IUCN.

Probably because of their feeding and breeding dependence on large old trees, great slaty woodpeckers are most common in primary forests and show density reductions of over 80% in logged forests. The global population is in decline because of the loss of forest cover and logging of old-growth forest throughout its range, with habitat loss being particularly rapid in Myanmar, Cambodia and Indonesia which are the countries that still hold the majority of the global population. In 2010, the great slaty woodpecker was included in the IUCN Red List in the Vulnerable category.
