= UOU =

UOU may refer to:

- Underwater Operations Unit, Naval Special Operations Command
- University of Ulsan, South Korea
- University of Utah, U.S.
- Uttarakhand Open University, India
