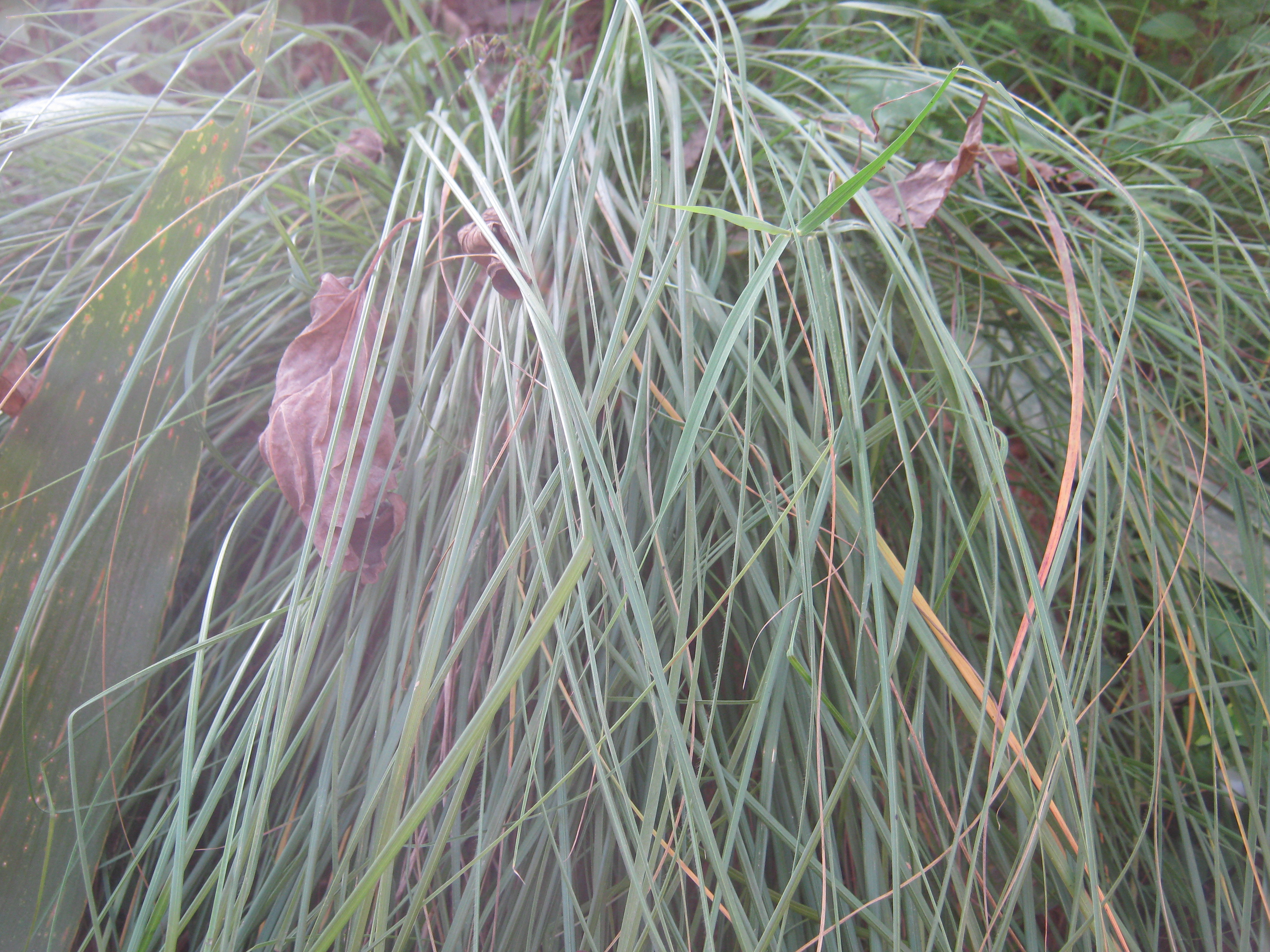
- Long leaves of Eulaliopsis binata used to make rope in Nepal

Scientific classification
- Kingdom: Plantae
- Clade: Tracheophytes
- Clade: Angiosperms
- Clade: Monocots
- Clade: Commelinids
- Order: Poales
- Family: Poaceae
- Subfamily: Panicoideae
- Genus: Eulaliopsis
- Species: E. binata

Binomial name
- Eulaliopsis binata (Retz.) C.E. Hubb.

Synonyms
- Andropogon binatus Retz.; Ischaemum binatum (Retz.) Buse; Pollinidium binatum (Retz.) C.E.Hubb.; Spodiopogon binatus (Retz.) Roberty; Spodiopogon angustifolius Trin.; Andropogon involutus Steud.; Andropogon notopogon Steud.; Andropogon obvallatus Steud.; Spodiopogon laniger Nees ex Steud.; Spodiopogon notopogon Nees ex Steud.; Pollinia eriopoda Hance; Spodiopogon involutus (Steud.) W.Watson; Ischaemum angustifolium (Trin.) Hack.; Eulaliopsis angustifolia (Trin.) Honda; Pollinidium angustifolium (Trin.) Haines; Eulaliopsis duthiei Sur

= Eulaliopsis binata =

Species of grass

Eulaliopsis binata, the sabaigrass or Chinese alpine rush, is a perennial plant belonging to the grass family that is grown in many Asian countries like China, Nepal, India, Pakistan, Bhutan, Myanmar, Thailand, Malaysia and Philippines.

It is called bhabhar in India and lends the name to the region south of Himalayas where it grows. It is called Babiyo in Nepal.

It is mainly used for the manufacture of writing and printing paper. Pulping is done using soda and sulfate processes. In Nepal, it is used to make rope for swing for Dashain festival, one of the greatest festivals of Hindu people.
