= Motahaldu =

- town
- Interactive map of Motahaldu
- Coordinates: 29.1404179°N 79.5209279°E
- Country: India
- State: Uttarakhand
- District: Nainital

Population (2011)
  - Total: 424

Languages
  - Official: Hindi
  - Native: Kauravi
- Time zone: UTC+5:30 (IST)
- PIN: 263139
- Vehicle registration: UK
- Website: uk.gov.in

Motahaldu or Himmatpur Motahaldu is a village in Lalkuan sub-district, Nainital district, in the Indian state of Uttarakhand. It sits on National Highway 109, and is c. 8 kilometres (5.0 mi) south of Haldwani. The nearest railway station is Lalkuan Junction (LKU) and the nearest airport is Pantnagar Airport (PGH).

== Demographics ==
As of the 2011 census, Motahaldu had 77 households and 424 inhabitants.

== Economy ==
Motahaldu has several stone factories, dairy and agricultural farms.

Mahaveer Audyogik Aasthan (AOP) private industrial estate is in Padlipur village. A number of industries operate in the estate.

A temple and a government medical centre are also present.

== Villages ==
Motahldu has many villages, including Kishanpur Sakuliya, Sufi Bhagwanpur, Padampur Devalia, Jaypurbisa, and Bhawanipur Harsing.
