= Bhabar =

Region of the Himalayas

Bhabar or Bhabhar is a region south of the Lower Himalayas and the Sivalik Hills in Garhwal and Kumaon, India. The Bhabhar region contains some of the largest cities of Kumaon and Garhwal: Dehradun, Haridwar, Haldwani, Rishikesh, Ramnagar, Tanakpur and Kotdwar. It is the alluvial apron of sediments washed down from the Sivaliks along the northern edge of the Indo-Gangetic Plain.

The Indo-Gangetic Plains are generally thought of as a flat region with no variations, although this is not true. The plains can be classified into four regions on the basis of relief features. The Bhabar is a belt of 8–16 km lying parallel to the slopes of the Sivaliks, where the river descending from the mountains deposit pebbles. The streams flow through the pebbles the region, hence disappearing from sight. They re-emerge only after some distance south, in the relief feature Terai.

== Etymology ==
The name Bhabar refers to a local tall-growing grass, Eulaliopsis binata, used for the manufacture of paper and rope.

== Overview ==
Bhabar plains are located in Kumaon and Garhwal. The Ganges River lies to the west and Sharda to the east. Bhabar is the gently-sloping coarse alluvial zone below the Shivalik Hills (outermost foothills of the Himalayas) where streams disappear into permeable sediments. The underground water level is deep in this region, then rises to the surface in the Terai below where coarse alluvium gives way to less permeable silt and clay. Due to the top-soil replenishment every monsoon, It is also a fertile area with large yields per unit area.

Being at the junction of Himalayas and the Indo-Gangetic Plain, Bhabar contains almost all the important trade and commerce hubs of Kumaon, including its largest city Haldwani.

== History ==
In 1901 Bhabar was also one of four division of Nainital district. It included 4 towns and 511 villages with a combined population of 93,445 (1901), spread over 1,279 square miles (3,310 km^{2}). It corresponded to the current subdivision of Haldwani. Bhabar lands were used by Van Gurjars cattle herders of Kumaon and Garhwal. They spend their winters in bhabars.
