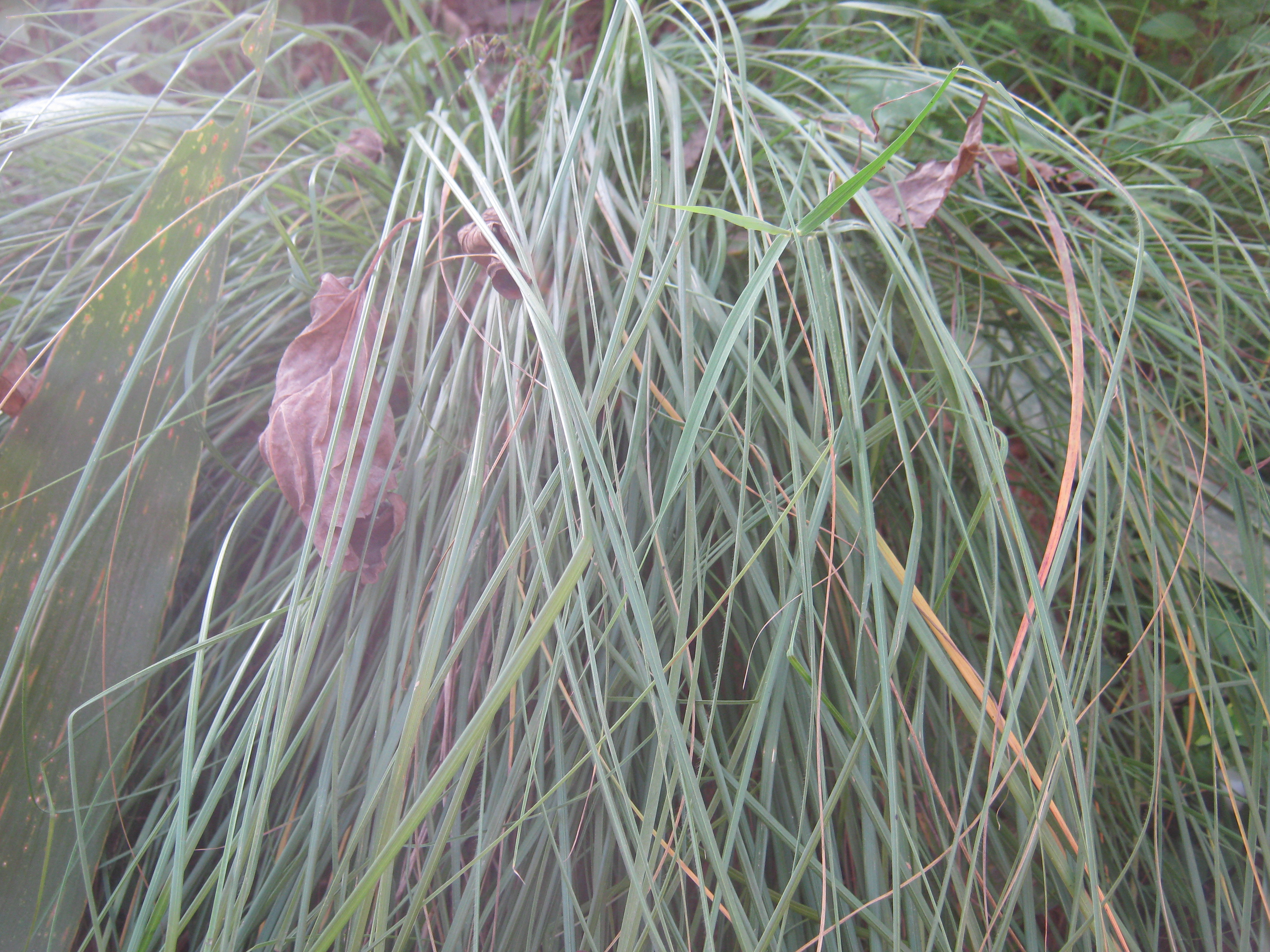
- Eulaliopsis binata

Scientific classification
- Kingdom: Plantae
- Clade: Tracheophytes
- Clade: Angiosperms
- Clade: Monocots
- Clade: Commelinids
- Order: Poales
- Family: Poaceae
- Subfamily: Panicoideae
- Supertribe: Andropogonodae
- Tribe: Andropogoneae
- Genus: Eulaliopsis; Honda

Type species
- Eulaliopsis angustifolia (syn of E. binata) (Trin.) Honda

Synonyms
- Pollinidium Stapf ex Haines

= Eulaliopsis =

Genus of grasses

Eulaliopsis is a genus of Asian plants in the grass family.

== Species ==
- Eulaliopsis binata (Retz.) C.E.Hubb. - Guangdong, Guangxi, Guizhou, Henan, Hubei, Shaanxi, Sichuan, Taiwan, Yunnan, Afghanistan, Arunachal Pradesh, Bhutan, Assam, Sikkim, Uttarakhand, Himachal Pradesh, Jammu & Kashmir, Japan, Myanmar, Nepal, Pakistan, Philippines, Thailand
- Eulaliopsis sykesii Bor - Nepal, Sikkim
