= Eulaliopsis sykesii =

Scientific classification
- Kingdom: Plantae
- Clade: Tracheophytes
- Clade: Angiosperms
- Clade: Monocots
- Clade: Commelinids
- Order: Poales
- Family: Poaceae
- Subfamily: Panicoideae
- Genus: Eulaliopsis
- Species: E. sykesii

Binomial name
- Eulaliopsis sykesii Bor

Species of grass

Eulaliopsis sykesii is a perennial plant belonging to the grass family. It is found in Nepal and the Eastern Himalayas. It was first scientifically described by Bor in 1957.
