= Haldwani =

- City
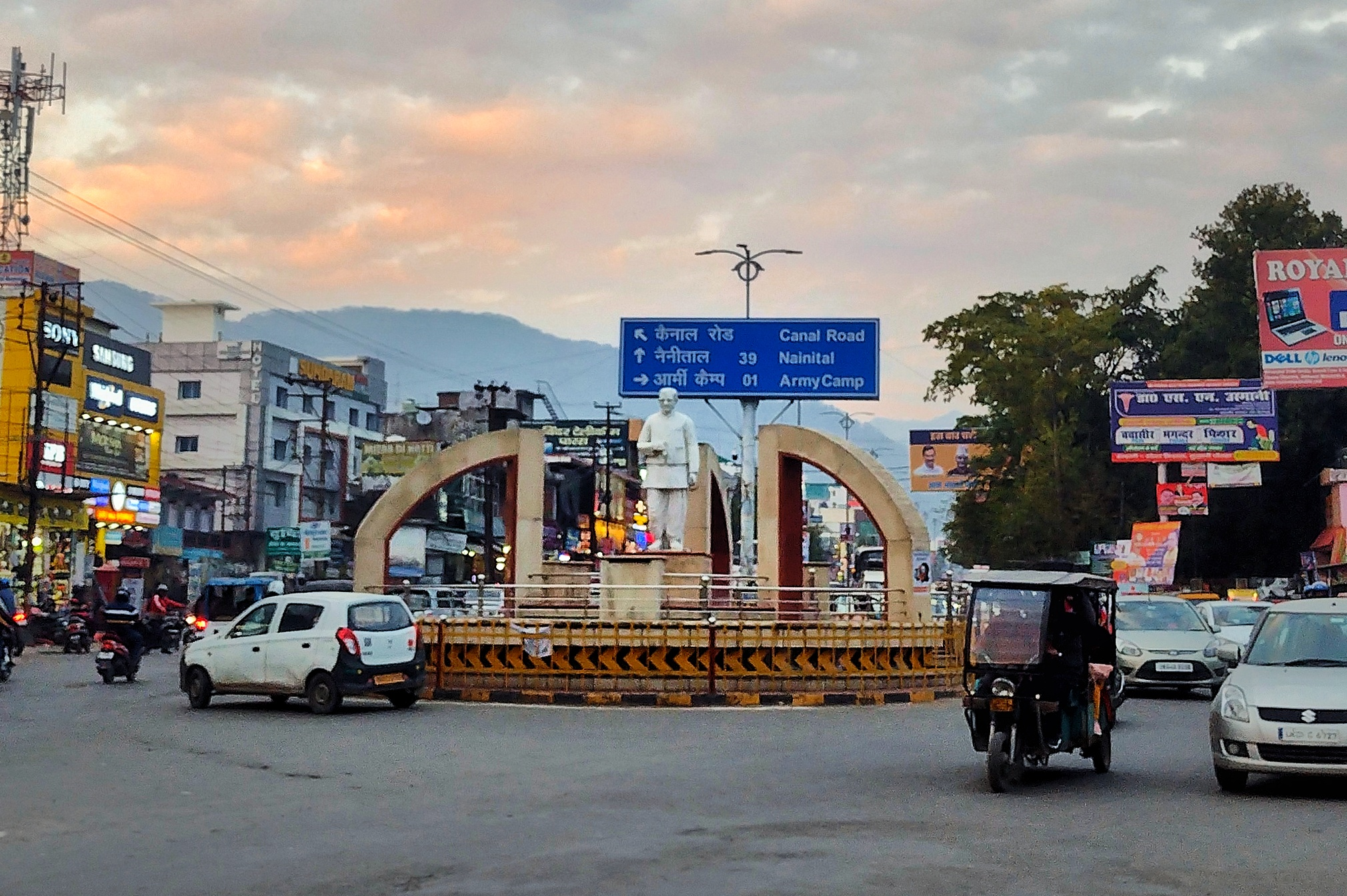
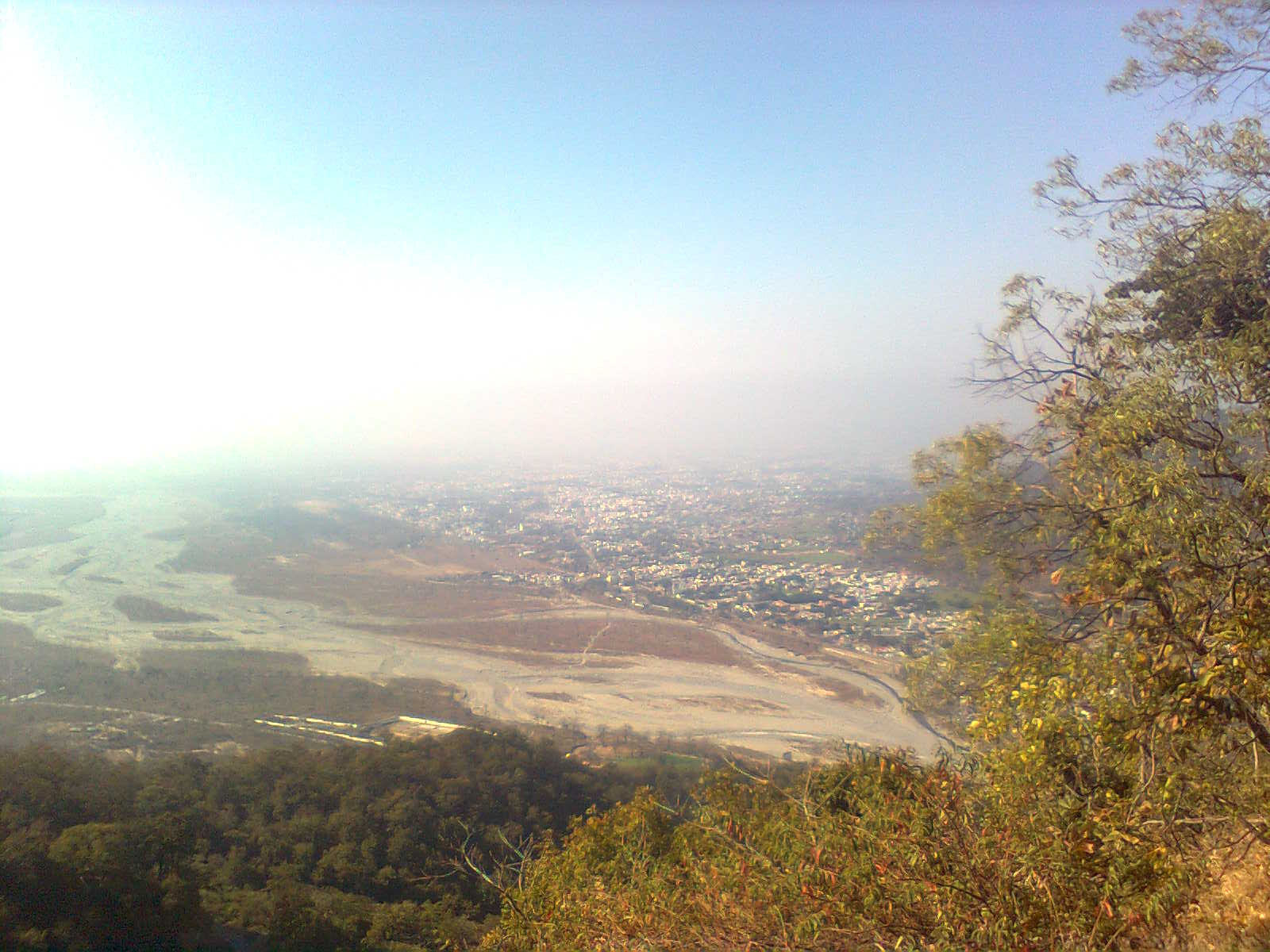
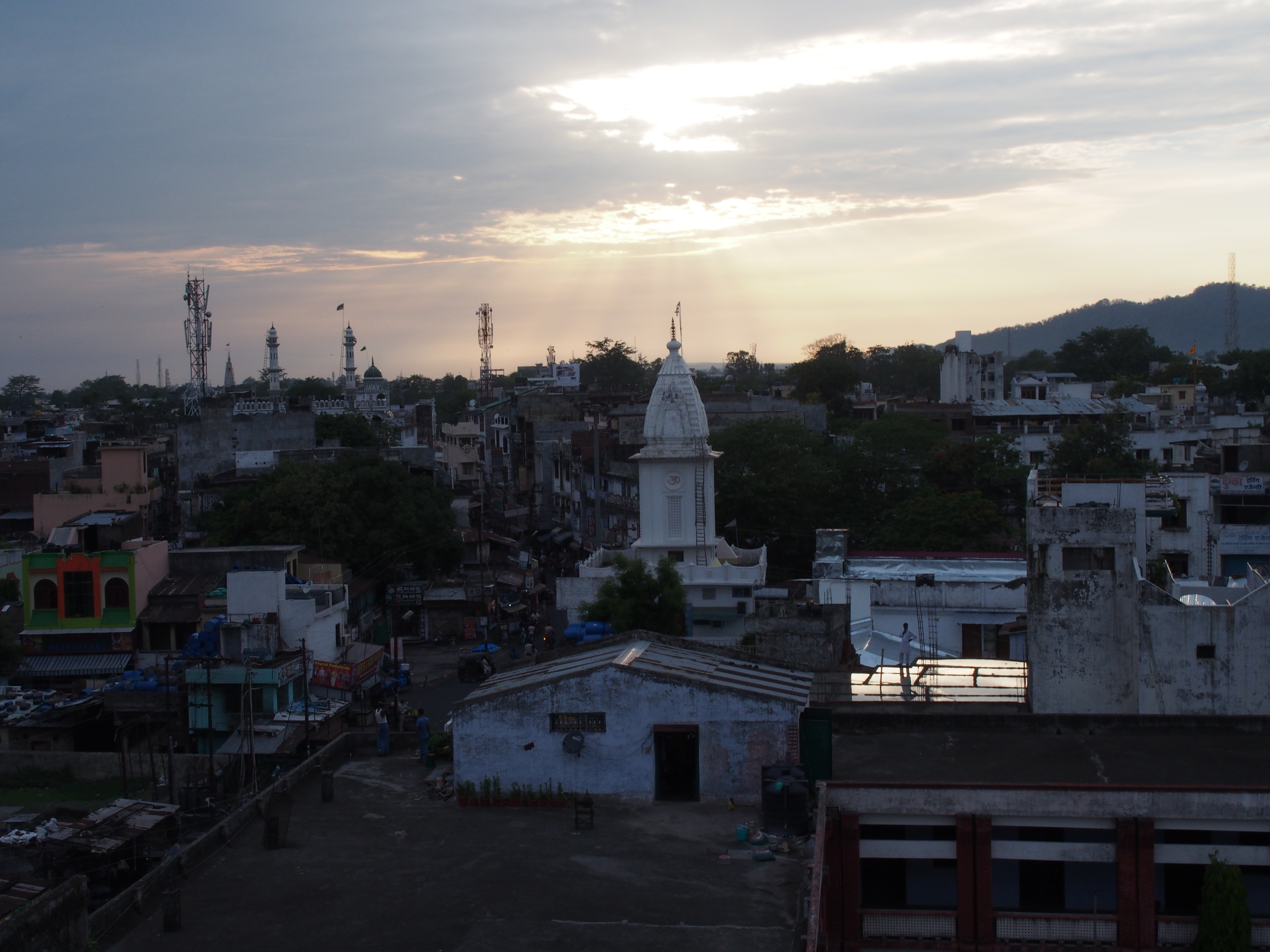
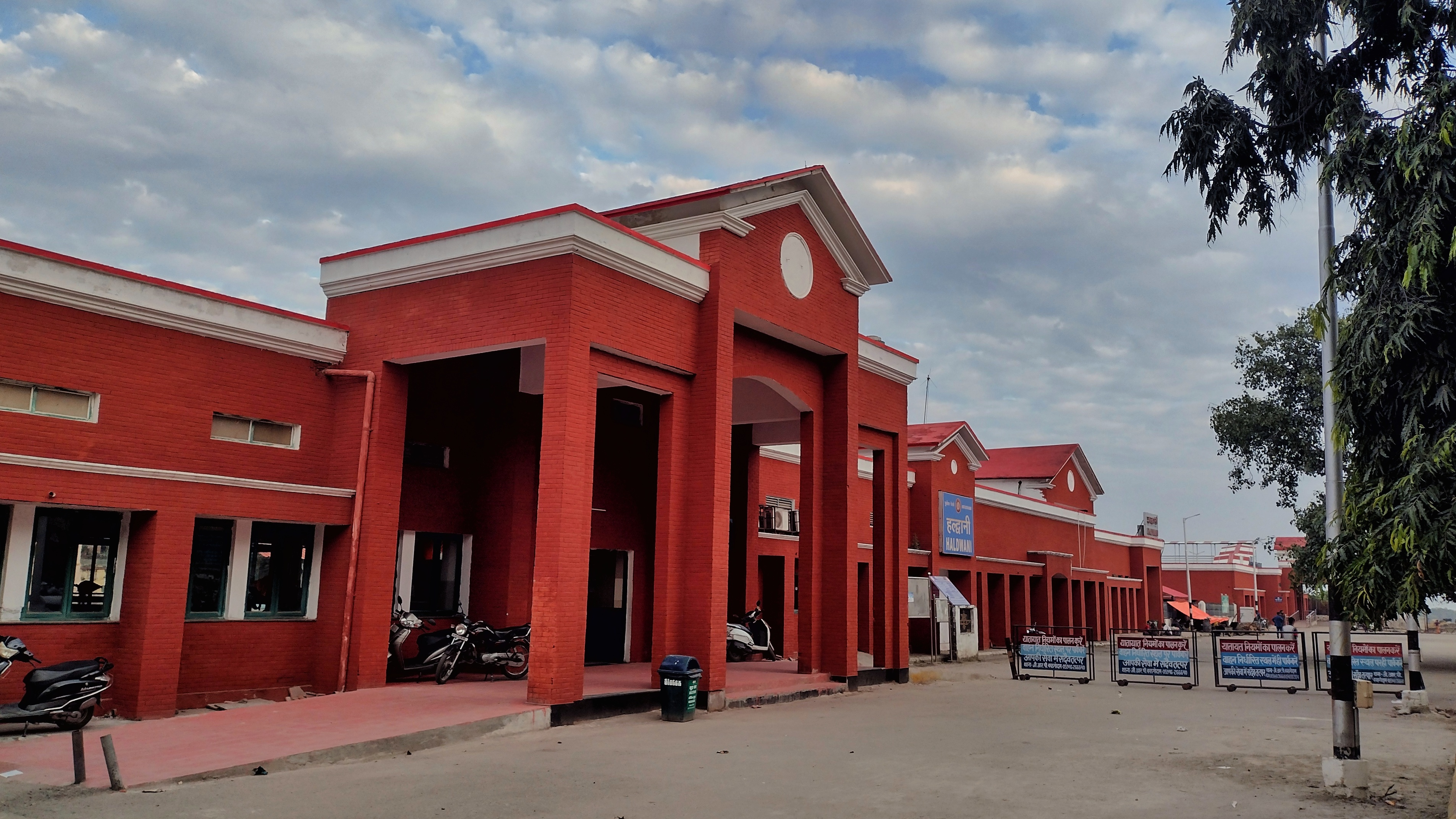
- Nicknames: Gateway of Kumaon
- Location in Uttarakhand, India
- Coordinates: 29.22°N 79.52°E
- Country: India
- State: Uttarakhand
- Division: Kumaon
- District: Nainital
- Founded: 1834
- Municipality: 1942
- Founder: George William Traill
- Named for: Haldu

Government
  - Type: Municipal Corporation
  - Body: Haldwani Municipal Corporation
  - Mayor: Gajraj Singh Bisht (BJP)
  - Lok Sabha MP: Ajay Bhatt (BJP)
  - Municipal Commissioner: Paritosh Verma, IAS

Area (Including Kathgodam)
  - City: 40 km^{2} (15 sq mi)
- Elevation: 424 m (1,391 ft)

Population (2011) (Including Kathgodam)
  - City: 201,461
  - Density: 5,000/km^{2} (13,000/sq mi)
  - Metro: 232,095

Languages
  - Official: Hindi
  - Native: Kumaoni; Khariboli
- Time zone: UTC+5:30 (IST)
- PIN: 263139,263141
- Telephone code: +91-5946
- Vehicle registration: UK-04
- Website: nagarnigamhaldwani.com

Haldwani (Kumaoni: Haldvānī) is the largest city of Kumaon, and the third most populous city in the Indian state of Uttarakhand. Haldwani is said to be the financial nexus of Uttarakhand, having the most commercial, economic and industrial activities of the state. Haldwani is located in the Nainital District, and is one of its thirteen subdivisions. Being situated in the immediate foothills of Kumaon Himalayas, the Kathgodam neighbourhood of Haldwani is known as the Gateway to Kumaon.

Located in the Bhabhar region in the Himalayan foothills on the banks of the Gaula River, the town of Haldwani was established in 1834, as a mart for hill people who visited Bhabar during the cold season. The establishment of the Bareilly–Nainital provincial road in 1882 and the Bhojeepura–Kathgodam railway line by Rohilkund and Kumaon Railway in 1884 helped develop the town into a major trading post and then a hub between the hilly regions of Kumaon and the Indo-Gangetic Plains.

Haldwani hosted National Games 2025 (Gaulapar).

== Etymology ==
The toponym "Haldwani" is an anglicised derivative of the Kumaoni term Haldu-vani, which translates literally to the "forest of Haldu". The settlement was named after the Haldu tree (botanically classified as Haldina cordifolia), a deciduous species that grew in massive abundance across the local Bhabar foothills.

Historically, these forests dominated the landscape prior to the heavy deforestation of the region, which was carried out to clear land for agricultural expansion and human settlement. The local hill populations regionally referred to the resting place as Halduvani until 1834. In that year, George William Traill, the British Commissioner of Kumaon, officially anglicised the name to Haldwani after taking over the administration and developing the clearing into a structured trading markets for merchants.

== History of haldwani ==
Haldwani developed in the Bhabar region at the southern foot of the Kumaon Himalayas. Before the establishment of the modern town, several older villages in the Chhakhata Bhabar were inhabited since the period of the Chand dynasty of the Kingdom of Kumaon. Subsequently there was migration of people from the Ramgarh hills into the plains and led to the establishment of the settlements like Mukhani, "the two Haldwanis" (Choti Haldwani and Main Haldwani) and Kusumkhera. The region came under the dominion of Kumaon, when King Gyan Chand of Chand Dynasty visited Delhi Sultanate in the 14th century. Later, the Mughals tried to take over the hills, but their attempts received a setback due to the difficult terrain.

In the early 1600s, the Haldwani region was sparsely populated. It was inhabited by people of a Native tribe known as the Buksa.

=== Founding and 19th century ===
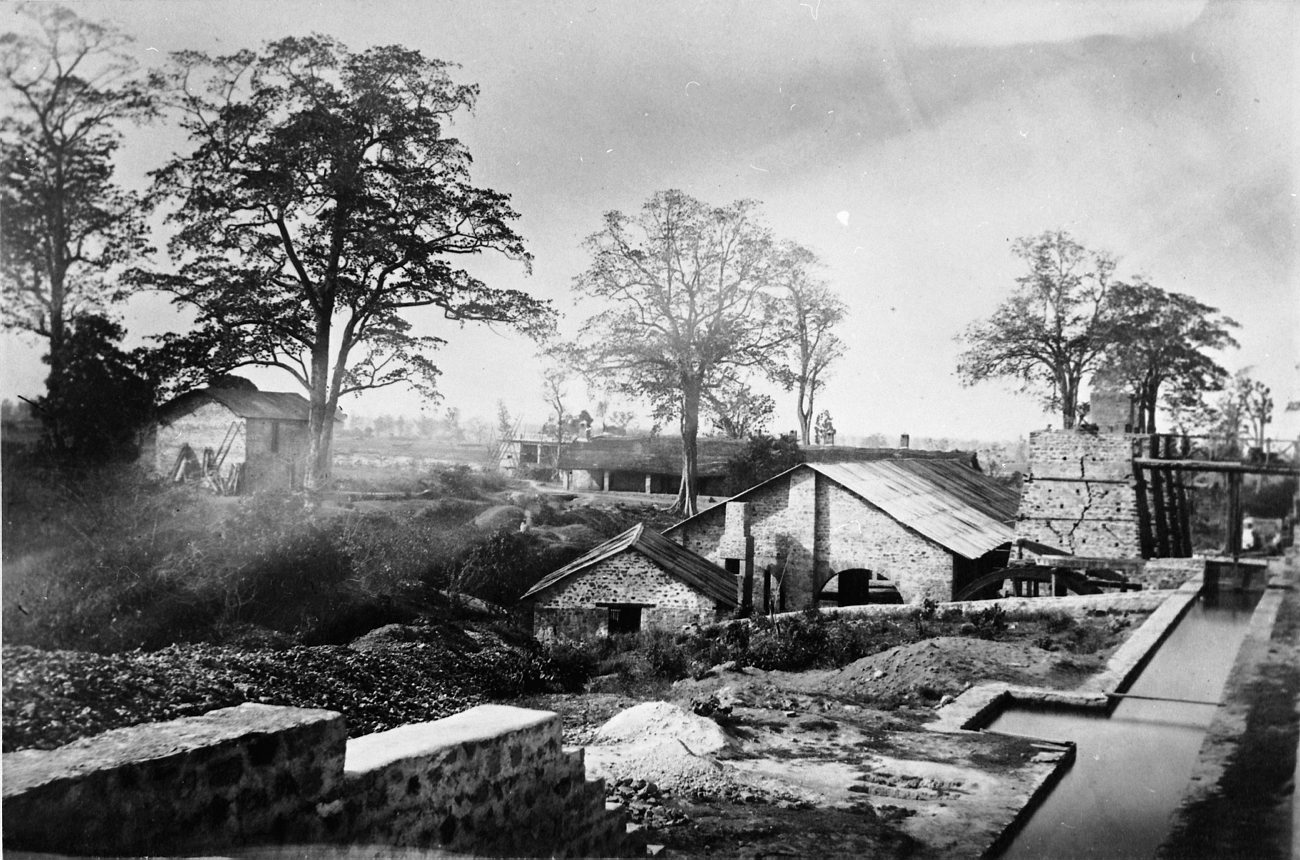
Ironworks in Kaladhungi at the turn of 1862/1863.

In 1816, after the British defeated Gorkhas, and gained control of Kumaon by the Treaty of Sugauli, Gardner was appointed the Commissioner of Kumaon. Later George William Traill took over as Commissioner and renamed Halduvani as Haldwani in the year 1834. Though British records suggest that the place was established in the year 1834, as a mart for hill people who visited the Bhabhar (Himalayan foothills) region, during the winter season. The township, formerly located in Mota Haldu, had only thatched houses. Brick-houses began to be built only after the year 1850. The first English middle school was established in the year 1831.

During the Indian Rebellion of 1857, Haldwani was briefly seized by the rebels of Rohilkhand, soon martial law was declared in the region by Sir Henry Ramsay (the Commissioner of Kumaon), and by 1858, the region was cleared of the rebels. The Rohillas, who were accused of attacking Haldwani, were hanged by the British at Phansi Gadhera in Nainital. Later, Ramsay connected Nainital with Kathgodam by road in 1882. In 1883–84, the railway track was laid between Bareilly and Kathgodam. The first train arrived at Haldwani from Lucknow on 24 April 1884.

Before the formation of Nainital district in 1891, it was part of the Kumaon district, which was later renamed Almora district. The Town Act was implemented here in 1885 and Haldwani was declared a municipality on 1 February 1897. The Tehsil office was opened here in 1899, when it became the tehsil headquarters of the Bhabar, one of four divisions of the Nainital district, and included 4 towns and 511 villages; and had a combined population of 93,445 (1901), spread over 1,279 sq. miles.

=== 20th and 21st centuries ===
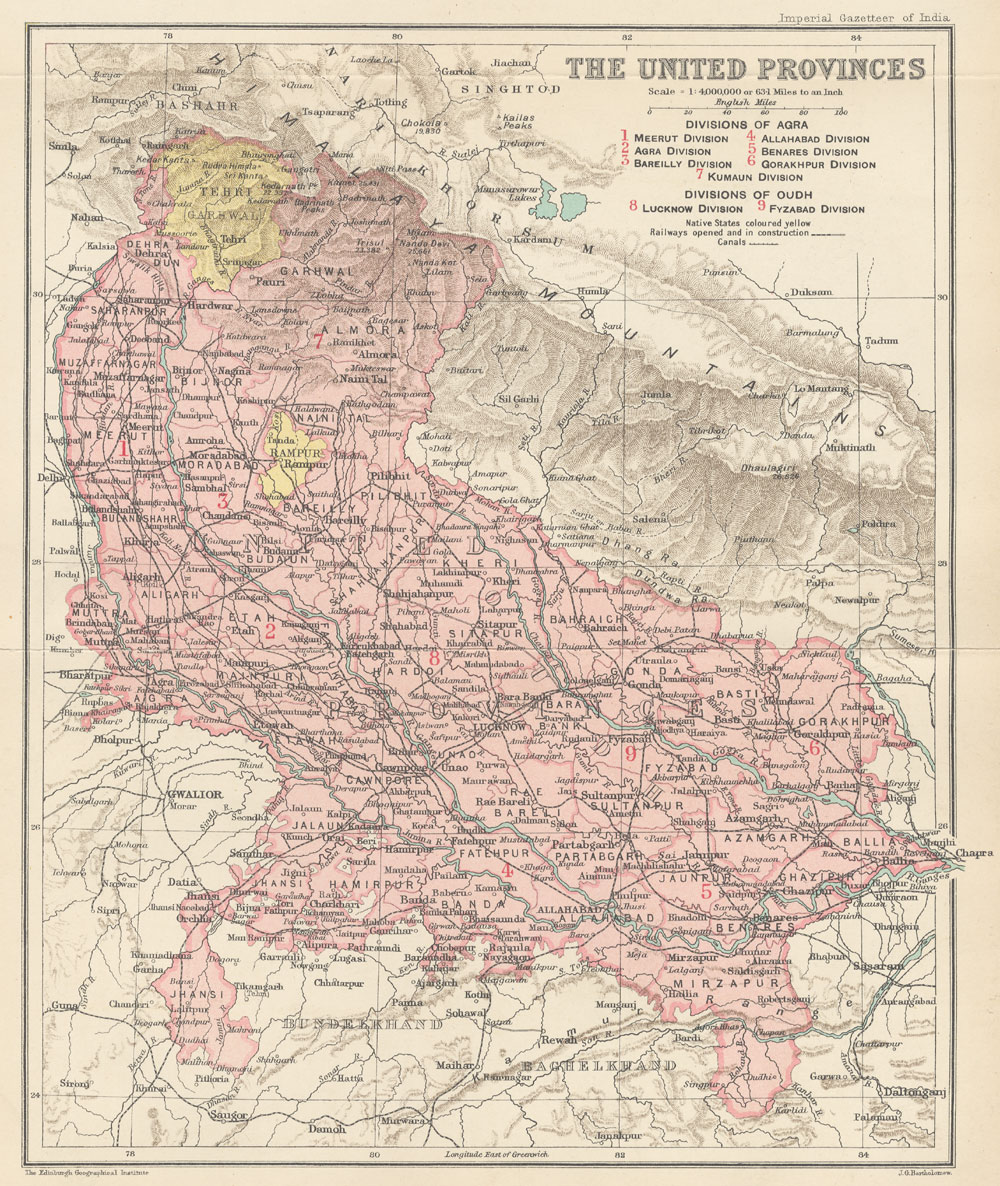
Haldwani as a part of the United Province, 1907–1909

In 1901, with a population of 6,624, Haldwani was the headquarters of the Bhabhar region of Nainital District, in the United Provinces of Agra and Oudh, and it also used to become the winter headquarters of the officers of the Kumaon Division and the Nainital District. The Arya Samaj Bhavan was built in 1901 and Sanatan Dharm Sabha in 1902. The Municipality of Haldwani was disestablished in 1904, and Haldwani was constituted as a Notified area. The first Hospital of the city was opened in 1912.

Haldwani hosted the second session of the Kumaon Parishad in 1918. Protests against the Rowlatt Act and for Coolie-Begar Abolition were held all over the city in 1920 under the leadership of Pt. Tara Datt Gairola Raibahadur. Many processions were carried out in the city between 1930 and 1934 during the Civil disobedience movement. In 1940, at the Haldwani conference, Badri Datt Pandey voiced for granting special status to the mountainous regions of Kumaon in the United Provinces, thus, giving a way to the future Uttarakhand movement.

Haldwani was a mid-sized town, with a population of about 25,000, in 1947, when India became Independent from the British Rule. Haldwani became a part of the Indian state of Uttar Pradesh. The city was electrified in 1950. The 2nd battalion of the Naga Regiment, affectionately known as Head Hunters, was raised at Haldwani on 11 February 1985. Haldwani played a major role in the Uttarakhand movement. The town was spearheading the agitation, which often ended up in violence and also in police firing and brutality.

Forty human skeletons and 300 "grave-like structures" were discovered in Haldwani's Golapar area on 9 May 2017 during the construction of the Haldwani ISBT. The skeletons were speculated to be the remains of the Rohilla chieftains from Bareilly who fought against the British in 1857 and were killed by the British army or of those who died of epidemics, malaria or famine. However, forensic tests later revealed the skeletons to be only two years old.

== Geography ==
=== Topography and city layout ===
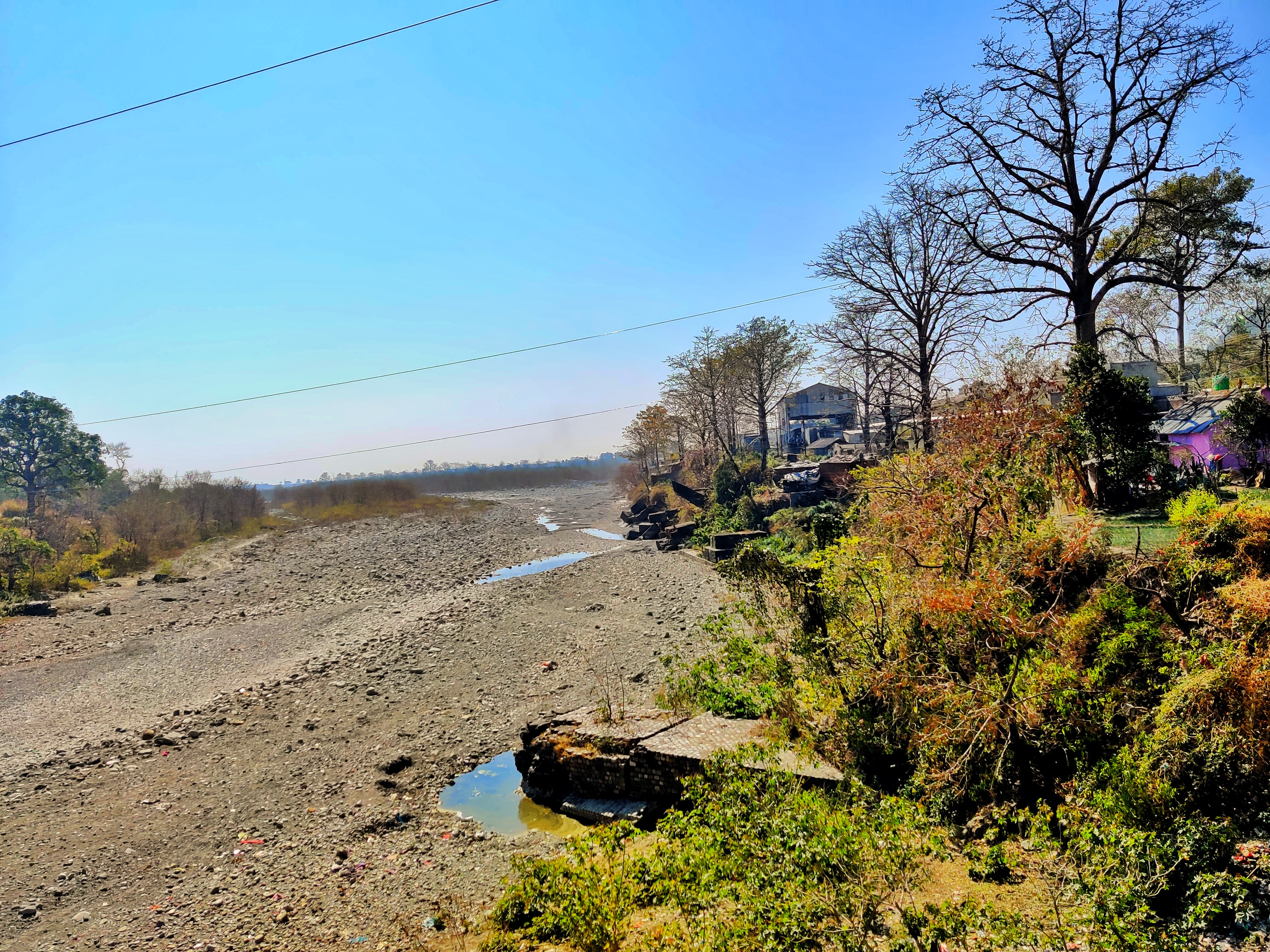
Dry bed of the Gaula River near Kathgodam, highlighting the porous geology characteristic of the Bhabar region in which Haldwani is situated.

Haldwani is located in the Nainital district on the right bank of the Gaula River, with its geographical coordinates at 29.22°N 79.52°E. Geologically, the city rests on a piedmont grade known as the Bhabar, a porous, sloping landscape where mountain rivers transition underground before re-emerging in the Indo-Gangetic Plain. The Haldwani Bhabar region stretches horizontally across the state, bounded by the Shivalik Hills to the north and the marshy Terai plains of Rudrapur to the south.

The city has an average elevation of 424 m (1,391 ft) above sea level. In terms of geological stability, Haldwani falls under seismic zone IV on the national earthquake hazard zoning map, indicating a high vulnerability to seismic activity.

The municipal and tehsil area encompasses approximately 958 square kilometres of flat and undulating terrain. Originally concentrated around Mota Haldu when founded in the 1830s, the urban footprint gradually expanded northwards toward the modern bazaar and the Haldwani railway station. Due to rapid population influxes in the early 21st century and a historical lack of centralized urban planning, the city has experienced largely unregulated expansion. This has resulted in the proliferation of high-density residential colonies with narrow road networks, which places heavy strain on local infrastructure. In municipal evaluations, the city ranked 395th out of 434 cities in the 2017 Swachh Survekshan national cleanliness survey.

=== Metropolitan area ===
Haldwani serves as the principal urban centre within the Haldwani Urban Agglomeration. Beyond the primary municipal boundaries of Haldwani and Kathgodam, the agglomeration encompasses two census towns, Mukhani and Haldwani Talli, alongside eleven continuous urban outgrowths including Kusumkhera, Bamori, Damua Dhunga, and Haripur Sukha.

Administratively, Haldwani is designated as one of the constituent tehsils of the Nainital district. The tehsil is situated in the southern periphery of the district, sharing its borders with the tehsils of Nainital, Kaladhungi, and Lalkuan. It also bounds the Udham Singh Nagar district to the south and the Champawat district to the east, collectively comprising four towns and 202 villages under its administrative jurisdiction.

=== Climate ===
Haldwani features a humid subtropical climate (Köppen: Cwa), heavily influenced by its location at the immediate foothills of the Himalayas. The city experiences distinct seasonal variations marked by hot, humid summers and cool winters, with the vast majority of its annual rainfall occurring during the southwest monsoon season from July to September.

Climate data for Haldwani
Month	Jan	Feb	Mar	Apr	May	Jun	Jul	Aug	Sep	Oct	Nov	Dec	Year
Mean daily maximum °C (°F)	20.0 (68.0)	22.9 (73.2)	28.4 (83.1)	34.3 (93.7)	37.0 (98.6)	35.5 (95.9)	31.2 (88.2)	30.4 (86.7)	30.5 (86.9)	29.5 (85.1)	25.2 (77.4)	21.1 (70.0)	28.8 (83.9)
Daily mean °C (°F)	13.9 (57.0)	16.0 (60.8)	21.1 (70.0)	26.2 (79.2)	29.5 (85.1)	29.6 (85.3)	27.3 (81.1)	26.7 (80.1)	26.4 (79.5)	23.6 (74.5)	18.5 (65.3)	14.7 (58.5)	22.8 (73.0)
Mean daily minimum °C (°F)	7.8 (46.0)	9.2 (48.6)	13.9 (57.0)	18.2 (64.8)	22.0 (71.6)	23.7 (74.7)	23.4 (74.1)	23.1 (73.6)	22.4 (72.3)	17.7 (63.9)	11.8 (53.2)	8.3 (46.9)	16.8 (62.2)
Average rainfall mm (inches)	57 (2.2)	33 (1.3)	35 (1.4)	8 (0.3)	40 (1.6)	256 (10.1)	649 (25.6)	587 (23.1)	301 (11.9)	110 (4.3)	5 (0.2)	14 (0.6)	2,095 (82.6)

== Demographics ==
=== Population and growth ===
According to the 2011 Census of India, the Haldwani municipal area recorded a population of 201,461, while the broader Haldwani-cum-Kathgodam urban agglomeration registered a total population of 232,095. This demographic footprint established Haldwani as the third most populous urban center in Uttarakhand, trailing only Dehradun and Haridwar.

Driven by high inward migration from both the surrounding rural hills and neighboring states, the city's municipal boundary was significantly expanded in 2018. This expansion incorporated dozens of densely populated peri-urban villages, increasing the number of municipal wards from 33 to 60. Following this restructuring, official appraisal reports by the Asian Development Bank (ADB) estimated Haldwani's contemporary population to have reached approximately 370,810 by 2022. Situated in the Bhabar region, the city functions as the primary commercial transit corridor between the Indo-Gangetic Plain and the Kumaon division, resulting in a population growth rate that historically outpaces both state and national averages.

Historical population of Haldwani (1901 to 2011) Includes population figures of Haldwani and its Outgrowths.
Year	1901	1911	1921	1931	1941	1951	1961	1971	1981	1991	2001	2011
Pop.	7,498	7,605	8,536	11,288	17,976	25,065	38,035	52,205	77,300	104,195	158,896	201,461

A notable portion of this demographic growth has been absorbed by informal settlements, largely driven by labor migration. In 2011, the official slum population of the Haldwani and Kathgodam area was recorded at 24,991 individuals across 4,535 households, accounting for approximately 12.4% of the total municipal population.

=== Literacy and sex ratio ===
The urban agglomeration maintains an average literacy rate of 84.29%, which sits significantly higher than the 2011 national average of 74.04%. Disaggregated by gender, male literacy in Haldwani stands at 87.45%, while female literacy is recorded at 80.83%.

The sex ratio of the Haldwani-cum-Kathgodam area is 912 females for every 1,000 males. This ratio is heavily influenced by regional socio-economic migration patterns, wherein male workers frequently relocate from the rural hill districts of Kumaon to the commercial plains in search of employment, often leaving their families in their native villages. The child sex ratio (tracking ages 0 to 6 years) is recorded slightly lower at 889 girls per 1,000 boys.

=== Religion and languages ===
The religious composition of Haldwani is predominantly Hindu, accounting for 64.84% of the urban population (150,477 residents). Islam forms the second-largest religious community, adhered to by 31.89% of the residents (74,013 residents), making Haldwani one of the most religiously diverse urban centers within the Nainital district. Minority religious communities include Sikhs at 2.19% and Christians at 0.90%.

Linguistically, the city serves as a cultural melting pot for the region. Hindi acts as the primary lingua franca for business, education, communication, and local administration, spoken as a first language by 56.45% of the population. The native Kumaoni language is the second most widely spoken language at 19.86%, underscoring the city's indigenous cultural roots and its continuous influx of migrants from the upper Kumaon hills.

Reflecting the large Muslim demographic and the city's historical trade connections to the plains of Rohilkhand, Urdu is spoken by 18.92% of the residents. A distinct Punjabi-speaking community accounts for 2.60% of the city, primarily tracing their settlement in the Terai-Bhabar region to the post-partition era of 1947. Smaller linguistic groups speaking Bengali, Garhwali, and Bhojpuri comprise the remaining 2.17% of the population.

Religion in Haldwani-Kathgodam (2011)
Hinduism	64.84%
Islam	31.89%
Sikhism	2.19%
Christianity	0.90%
Others	0.18%

Languages in Haldwani-Kathgodam (2011)
Hindi	56.45%
Kumaoni	19.86%
Urdu	18.92%
Punjabi	2.60%
Others	2.17%

== Education ==
Haldwani serves as a primary educational capital for the Kumaon region, housing a diverse range of higher education institutions, research centres, schools and other education grounds.

Universities and colleges Haldwani is home to the Uttarakhand Open University (UOU), the only open university in the state. It was established by an act of the Uttarakhand Legislative Assembly on 31 October 2005. Headquartered in the Teenpani neighbourhood, the university provides distance education across Uttarakhand, offering over 140 undergraduate, postgraduate, and diploma programmes.

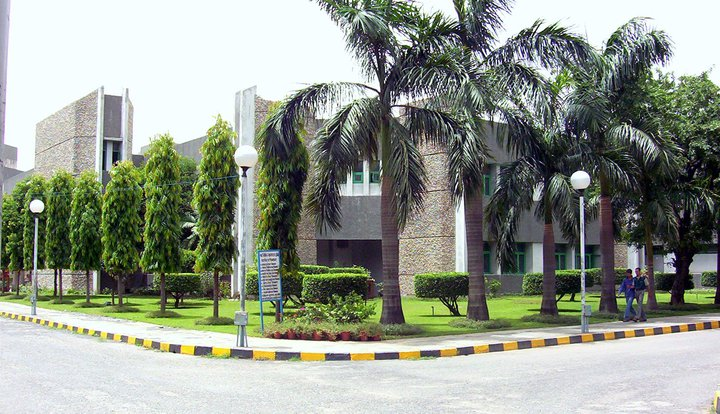
Government Medical College (GMC), Haldwani

The Government Medical College, Haldwani is the first government postgraduate medical college in Uttarakhand. The institution was originally established in 1997 as the Uttarakhand Forest Hospital Trust Medical College. In May 2010, the Government of Uttarakhand formally took over the trust and renamed the institution. The college is recognised by the National Medical Commission (NMC) and is affiliated with the Hemwati Nandan Bahuguna Uttarakhand Medical Education University in Dehradun. It serves as a major medical training centre alongside its affiliated teaching hospital, the Dr. Susheela Tiwari Memorial Hospital.

The city hosts several prominent degree colleges. Motiram Baburam Government Post Graduate College (MBGPG College) was established in July 1960 as a private institution by the Moti Ram Babu Ram Educational Trust. It was taken over by the state government in 1982 and is currently affiliated with Kumaun University. In 2004, the Government of Uttarakhand designated it as a Vishista Mahavidyalaya (Distinguished College). The Indira Priyadarshini Government Girls Post Graduate College of Commerce, established on 31 March 1996, is the first and only dedicated government girls' postgraduate college in Uttarakhand.

Among private institutions, the Amrapali Group of Institutes (now Amrapali University), established in 1999, is a major higher education provider in the foothills, offering degrees in engineering, computer applications, hospitality management, pharmacy, and commerce. Graphic Era Hill University also operates a regional campus in Haldwani.

Research institutions Haldwani is the location of the Defence Institute of Bio-Energy Research (DIBER), a specialised defence laboratory operating under the Defence Research and Development Organisation (DRDO). Originally tracing its roots to 1967 and relocated/renamed in 2008, the institute focuses on the research and development of bio-energy, biofuels, and sustainable high-altitude agro-technologies for use by the Indian Armed Forces.

Schools Haldwani's primary and secondary educational needs are served by a mix of government-funded and private schools. According to the 2011 District Census Handbook for Nainital, Haldwani had 198 government-financed educational institutions, comprising 73 primary schools, 25 middle schools, 25 secondary schools, and 25 senior secondary schools. Notable private senior secondary schools catering to the region include DAV Centenary Public School, Inspiration Public School, and St. Theresa Senior Secondary School.

== Economy ==
Haldwani is an important commercial and distribution centre in the Kumaon division of Uttarakhand. Its location at the foothills of the Himalayas contributes to its role in the movement of goods between the Indo-Gangetic Plain and the hill districts of Kumaon. The city functions as a major market and transport centre for nearby areas, including Nainital, Almora, Bageshwar, and Pithoragarh.

Trade and commercial activity form an important part of Haldwani's economy. Goods arriving from the plains, including textiles, consumer products, and construction materials, are distributed through the city to settlements in Kumaon and other parts of the region. Haldwani is connected by road with several major cities in northern India, while Kathgodam railway station, located nearby, provides rail connectivity with the Delhi region and other parts of the country. The concentration of wholesale markets, transport services, storage facilities, and related businesses has supported the city's role as a commercial centre for the Kumaon region.

Haldwani is also an important market for agricultural produce from Kumaon and the adjoining plains. The city's Naveen Mandi serves as a wholesale market for fruits, vegetables, and food grains. Agricultural products from the hill districts, including apples, peaches, plums, and vegetables, are brought to Haldwani for sale and distribution. The market also receives food grains and other agricultural products from the plains for supply to the hill districts. The city's position between the agricultural areas of the Kumaon hills and the larger markets of the plains has contributed to its role in the regional trade of agricultural produce.

The Gaula River, which flows along the eastern side of Haldwani, is a source of riverbed materials such as sand, gravel, and boulders. These materials, commonly referred to as riverbed material, are used primarily in the construction sector. Mining activities in the river are regulated by the Uttarakhand government and associated agencies, including the Uttarakhand Forest Development Corporation.

Revenue generated from Gaula riverbed mining has been a source of income for the state government. Reports have also noted contributions to the District Mineral Foundation, which supports development and welfare activities in areas affected by mining. Mining and the transport of riverbed materials also support associated activities, including vehicle transport, loading and labour services, and businesses involved in stone crushing and construction materials in the wider Nainital district.

== Government and politics ==
=== Civic Administration ===
Haldwani is a municipal corporation governed by a mayor–council system. The municipal area is divided into 60 territorial constituencies known as wards. The Municipal Corporation is made up of a Wards Committee, where each ward has one seat. Members, known as Councillors, are elected to the Wards Committee on the basis of adult franchise for a term of five years, as provisioned by the 74th Amendment of the Indian Constitution relating to urban local governments. The 'Nagar Nigam Haldwani' is a unicameral legislative body, comprising sixty Councillors, and the Mayor. In addition to the elected Councillors, the committee also includes fifteen councillors nominated by the state government and four additional members; the three MLAs and MP from the city.

The Town Act was implemented in Haldwani in 1885 after which, it was declared a municipality on 1 February 1897. The Municipality of Haldwani was soon disestablished and Haldwani was constituted as a 'notified area' in 1904. In 1907, it got the status of town area. The Haldwani-Kathgodam Municipal Council was established on 21 September 1942, and was upgraded to a Municipal corporation on 21 May 2011. Currently it is the third largest Municipal Corporation in the state of Uttarakhand just after Dehradun and Haridwar respectively.

=== Politics ===
The city is represented in the Lok Sabha by a representative elected from the Nainital-Udhamsingh Nagar Constituency. Ajay Bhatt, from BJP, is the current Member of Parliament from Nainital-Udhamsingh Nagar. He won the 2024 Lok Sabha elections by 3,34,458 votes against Prakash Joshi from the Congress. The city's first 33 wards are part of Haldwani Assembly constituency whose current MLA is Sumit Hridayesh. A lot of area is a part of the Kaladhungi (ward no. 34 to 55) and Lalkuan (ward no. 56 to 60) constituencies which are represented by Banshidhar Bhagat and Mohan Singh Bisht, both from the Bharatiya Janata Party, respectively.

== Transport ==
Haldwani serves as a critical transit node for the region, widely known as the Gateway to Kumaon. The city relies on a combination of government-owned railways and road networks, alongside state buses and private transport systems, to connect the Himalayan foothills to the Indo-Gangetic Plain.

=== Road ===
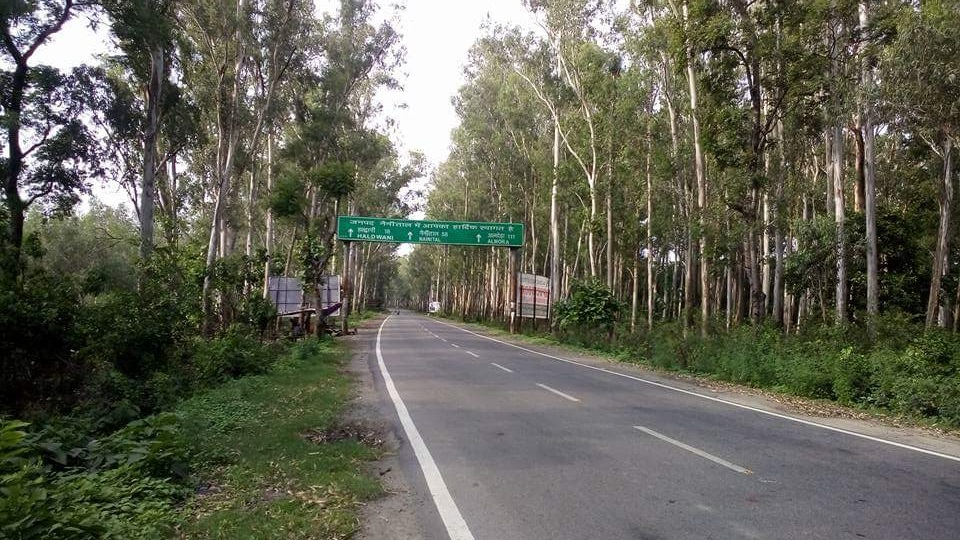
Rampur Road connects Haldwani to Rampur via Rudrapur and Bilaspur

National Highway 109 cuts through Haldwani, connecting it to the broader national road network. Other major roads facilitating trade and travel include the Bareilly–Bageshwar highway, Rampur Road, Haldwani–Kaladhungi–Ramnagar Road, and the Kathgodam–Sitarganj Road.

The Uttarakhand Transport Corporation (UTC) operates regular bus services from the Haldwani Bus Station to major cities, including New Delhi (Anand Vihar ISBT), Dehradun, and Lucknow. Complementing the state-run services are routes operated by the Kumaon Motor Owners Union (KMOU), which provides extensive connectivity to interior hill towns like Nainital, Almora, Ranikhet, and Pithoragarh.

New ISBT Project To decongest the city, a new 8-acre Inter State Bus Terminal (ISBT) was proposed in the Gaulapar region. Construction originally began in 2014 but was abruptly halted in May 2017 when workers discovered a large number of human skeletons at the site. Following years of political delays and proposals to shift the terminal to Teenpani, the transport department and land selection committee finally approved the original Gaulapar site in mid-2026 due to better road width and environmental clearance parameters.

=== Rail ===
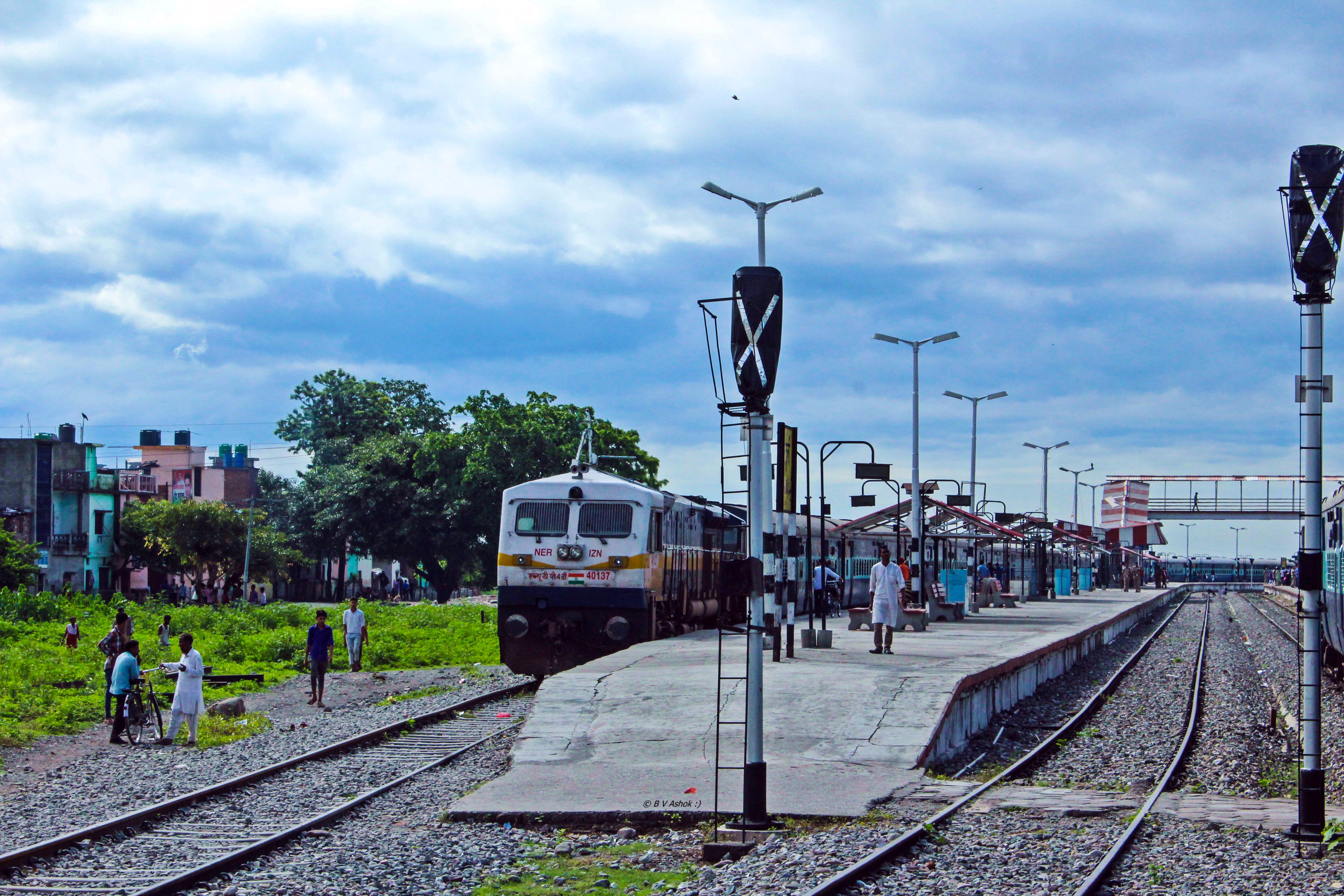
13019 Howrah – Kathgodam Bagh Express at Haldwani

Haldwani is heavily reliant on rail transport for interstate connectivity. Haldwani railway station, along with the adjacent Kathgodam terminal station, falls under the Izzatnagar Division of the North Eastern Railway (NER).

Historically, the railway track between Bareilly and Kathgodam was laid in 1883–84, with the first train arriving in Haldwani from Lucknow on 24 April 1884. Today, the stations serve as the primary railhead for Kumaon, providing direct trains to major Indian cities. Prominent trains operating from here include the New Delhi–Kathgodam Shatabdi Express, the Howrah-bound Bagh Express, and the Ranikhet Express.

=== Air ===
The nearest air gateway to Haldwani is the Pantnagar Airport (IATA: PGH), located approximately 28 km (17 mi) south of the city in Udham Singh Nagar district. The airport primarily operates under the government's UDAN regional connectivity scheme, handling domestic flights with direct connections to Indira Gandhi International Airport in New Delhi, operated by regional carriers. For international connectivity, residents rely on the airports in New Delhi and Lucknow.

== Sports ==
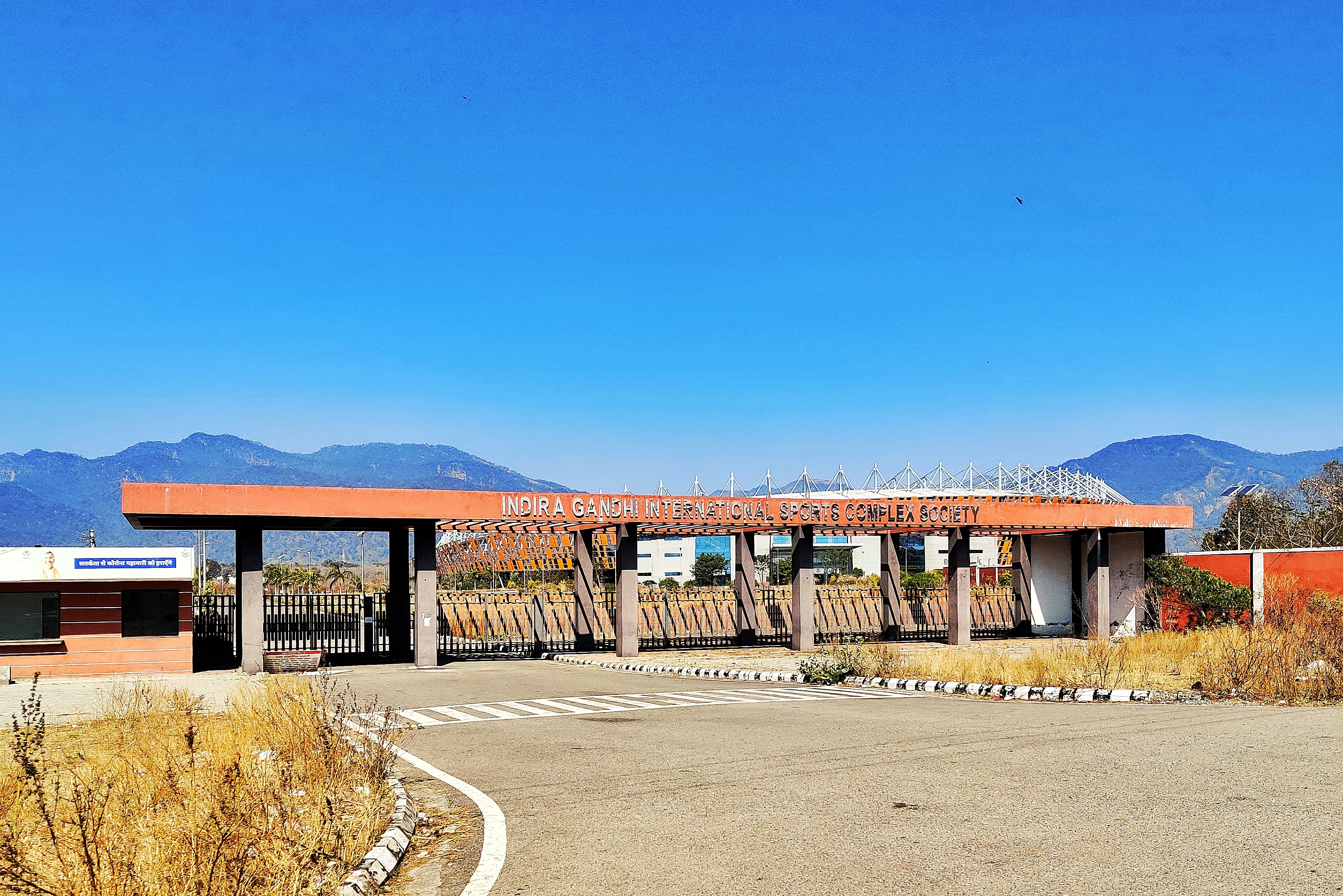
Indira Gandhi International Sports Stadium

Indira Gandhi International Sports Stadium is located in Haldwani. The stadium, having a capacity of 25000 people, was inaugurated on 18 December 2016 by Harish Rawat, the then Chief Minister of Uttarakhand. It is spread over an area of 70 acres and has cricket and football grounds, a track for 800-metre race, a hockey field, badminton courts, a lawn tennis court, a boxing ring, and a swimming pool.

Haldwani hosted a state-level football championship, and the first edition of CWE (Continental Wrestling Entertainment) pro-wrestling series, in 2016. Haldwani will be the second city after Delhi in northern India to have more than one international stadium. The Uttarakhand State Football Association has its headquarters in Haldwani.

== Media and communications ==
Haldwani, along with other areas of the Kumaon division, is served by the Almora station of the All India Radio. The first relay centre of Akashwani FM will be set up in Haldwani city on 1,560 sqm of land. The relay centre will broadcast FM radio programmes of the All India Radio round the clock within a range of 70 km. Internet Services are provided by BSNL, Vodafone, Bharti Airtel, Idea Cellular and Reliance jio. Hello Haldwani community radio broadcasts programmes on education, agriculture, health and local traditions from the campus of Uttarakhand Open University, Haldwani.

== Local attractions ==
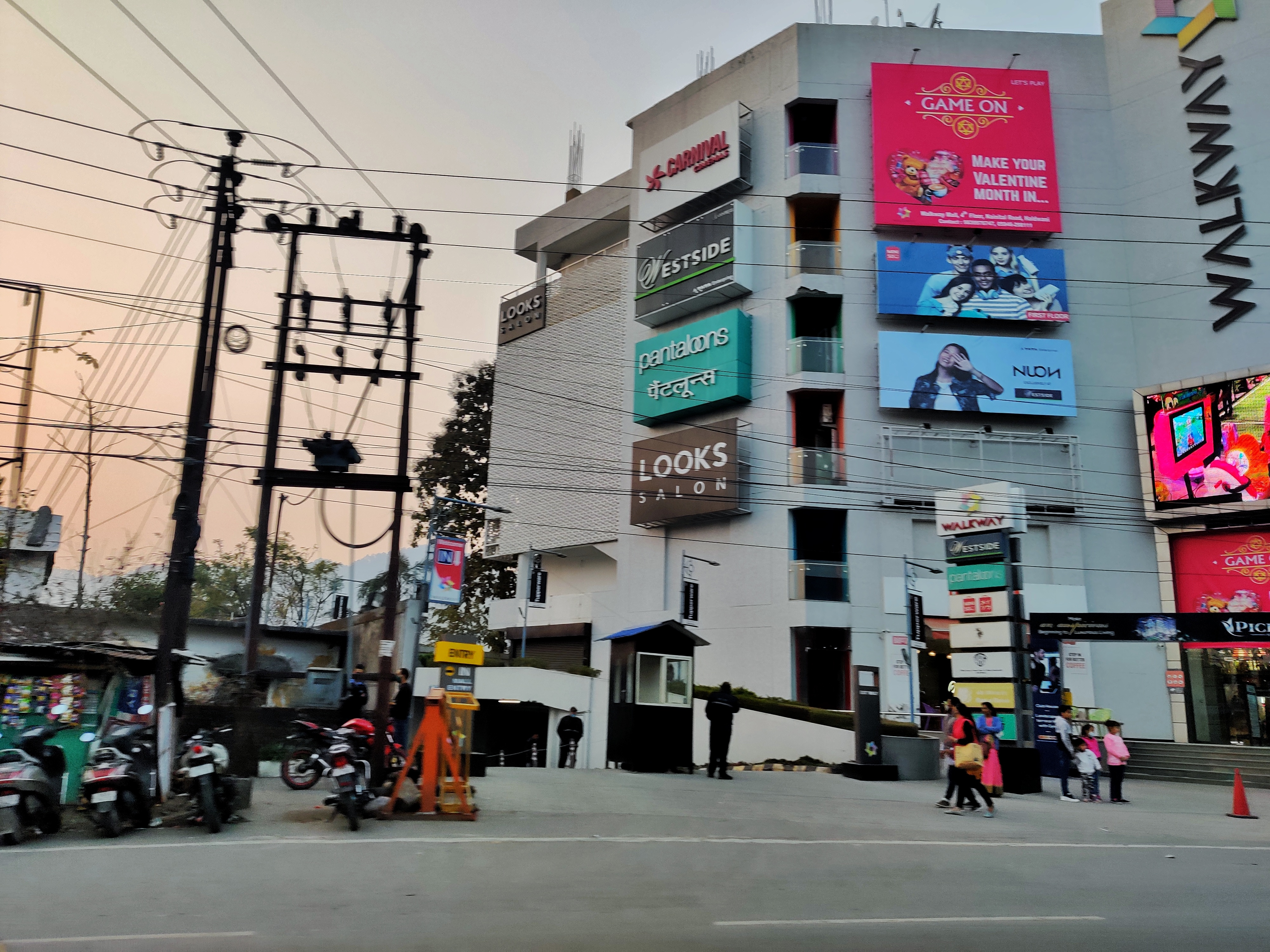
Walkway Mall on the Bareilly–Nainital Highway

Haldwani and its adjoining neighbourhood of Kathgodam host a variety of cultural, religious, and natural landmarks, functioning as the primary gateway for visitors entering the Kumaon region.

Among the major religious sites is the Sheetla Devi Temple, located on a hill near Ranibagh on the outskirts of the city. Dedicated to Goddess Durga, the shrine is a prominent local pilgrimage centre that draws large gatherings during the Navratri festival and provides panoramic views across the Shivalik foothills. Another historic site is the Kali Chaur Temple, situated in the forested area of Golapar. It serves as a traditional religious spot dedicated to Goddess Kali and is noted for its secluded natural environment. Near the central railway station, the Ashta Dasha Bhuja Lakshmi Temple features a large idol of Goddess Lakshmi depicted with eighteen hands, alongside subsidiary shrines dedicated to Ganesha, Shiva, and Hanuman.

Along the banks of the Gaula River in Kathgodam lies the Haidakhan Ashram. Established by the spiritual leader Haidakhan Babaji, the ashram functions as a retreat for meditation and spiritual learning, attracting both domestic and international visitors seeking isolation. Additionally, the Kathgodam railway station itself serves as a historical landmark. Constructed in 1884 by the Rohilkund and Kumaon Railway, the station retains its colonial-era architectural elements and remains a central transit point for tourists travelling to hill stations like Nainital and Almora.

The natural environment surrounding the city provides several ecological and recreational zones. The Gaula Barrage, constructed across the Gaula River in Kathgodam, was built primarily to regulate regional irrigation and municipal drinking water supplies. Over the years, the reservoir area has developed into a local open space frequented for birdwatching. On the southern periphery along the Tanda forest range toward Pantnagar, Sanjay Van provides a protected green space used for nature walks and the observation of the Terai ecosystem's flora and fauna. Furthermore, the Uttarakhand forest department is developing the Haldwani Zoo and Botanical Garden in the Gaulapar region. Designed to be a carbon-neutral wildlife habitat, the project aims to showcase regional biodiversity and promote eco-tourism in the Himalayan foothills.

Urban and modern infrastructural landmarks in Haldwani include the Indira Gandhi International Sports Stadium in Gaulapar. Spread over a 70-acre complex, it is one of the premier sports facilities in Uttarakhand, designed with modern infrastructure to host national-level sporting events. For commercial and retail recreation, the Walkway Mall situated on the Bareilly–Nainital highway operates as a central entertainment hub, housing multiplex cinemas, retail outlets, and restaurants for the local population and transit travellers.

== Notable people ==
The city has been associated with several prominent figures across politics, administration, and entertainment. George William Traill, the British Commissioner of Kumaon, played a foundational role in the city's history when he renamed the settlement to Haldwani in 1834 and developed it into a major regional trading mart.

In state and national politics, the city has been represented by various senior leaders. Indira Hridayesh, a prominent Indian National Congress politician, served as Uttarakhand's Finance Minister and Leader of the Opposition, representing the Haldwani assembly constituency for multiple terms until her death in 2021. She was succeeded by her son, Sumit Hridayesh, who won the Haldwani legislative assembly seat in the 2022 state elections. Other notable political figures from the region include Banshidhar Bhagat, a former cabinet minister and state president of the Bharatiya Janata Party, who represented Haldwani before shifting to the Kaladhungi constituency, and Tilak Raj Behar, who won the Haldwani seat in the 1990s and later served as the state Health Minister. Akbar Ahmad Dumpy, a former Member of Parliament from Azamgarh, also began his legislative career here after winning the Haldwani assembly seat in 1980.

In the entertainment industry, several film personalities trace their roots to the city. Saurabh Sachdeva, a Bollywood actor and prominent acting coach recognized for his performances in projects such as Sacred Games and Animal, was born in Haldwani. Similarly, actress and model Sonia Mann, known for her work in Punjabi cinema and Hindi cinema, was born in the city before her family relocated to Punjab.
