= Kaladhungi =

Kaladhungi (कालाढूंगी)
- Town
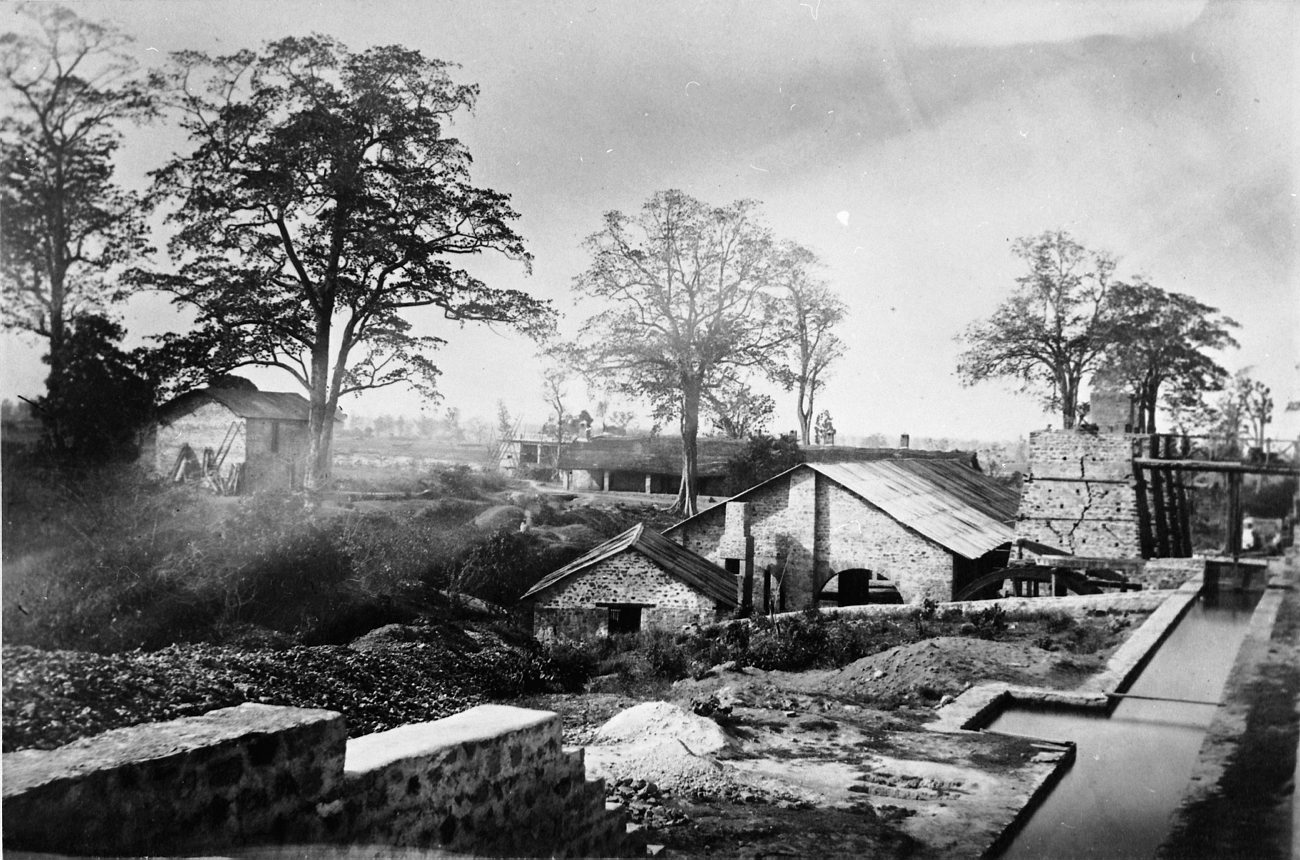
- Ironworks in Kaladhungi at the turn of 1862/1863.

- Location in Uttarakhand, India Kaladhungi (कालाढूंगी) (India) Kaladhungi (कालाढूंगी) (Asia)
- Coordinates: 29.28°N 79.35°E
- Country: India
- State: Uttarakhand
- District: Nainital
- Elevation: 393 m (1,289 ft)

Population (2024)
  - Total: 10,600

Languages
  - Official: Hindi
  - Native: Kauravi
- Time zone: UTC+7:00 (IST)
- PIN: 263140
- Vehicle registration: UK 04
- Website: udd.uk.gov.in/contents/view/5/105/

Kaladhungi is a town and a nagar palika in Nainital district in the Indian state of Uttarakhand.

The town is located just on the foothill, a good climate but summers are hot, located 21 km west of Haldwani on the Haldwani-Ramanagar road. Nainital is at distance of only 35 km to the north, Bajpur at about 26 km to south-west and Ramnagar 30 km to north-west. It has a road connecting to Delhi via Bajpur, Tanda, and Moradabad.

== Etymology ==
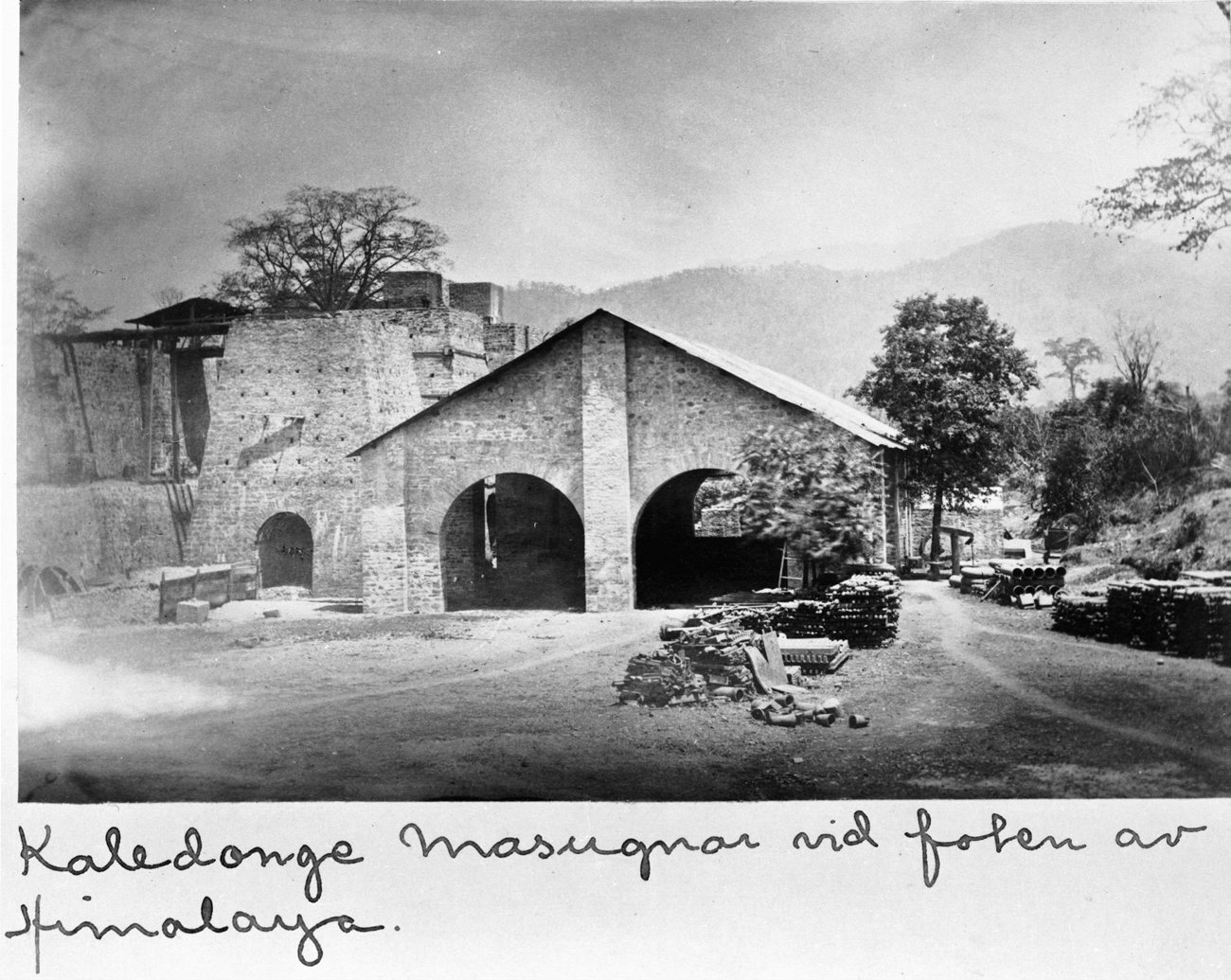
The blast in Caledonge (Kaladhungi) near the foot of Himalaya.

The name Kaladhungi comprises two words - kala meaning black and dhung meaning stone. Kaladhungi literally means black stone. In this region, black stones rich in iron content are found. The town used to be the center of booming iron factory based on local ore and forest charcoal.

== Geography ==
Kaladhungi is located at 29.28°N 79.35°E. It has an average elevation of 393 metres (1,289 feet) from the sea level.

== Demographics ==
As of 2001 India census, Kaladhungi had a population of 6,126. Males constitute 53% of the population and females 47%. Kaladhungi has an average literacy rate of 62%, higher than the national average of 59.5%: male literacy is 70%, and female literacy is 53%. In Kaladhungi, 16% of the population is under 6 years of age.

== Local attractions ==
Jim Corbett, the famous hunter and environmentalist, lived at Choti Haldwani, 2 km west of Kaladhungi on Ramnagar road for most of his life. His house has now been converted into a museum in his memory by the government, known as 'Jim Corbett Museum'. There are also the graves of his two dogs in the compound of the museum.

== Gallery ==
Various pictures of Kaladhungi
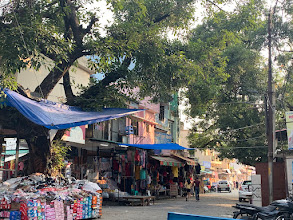
Kaladhungi Market

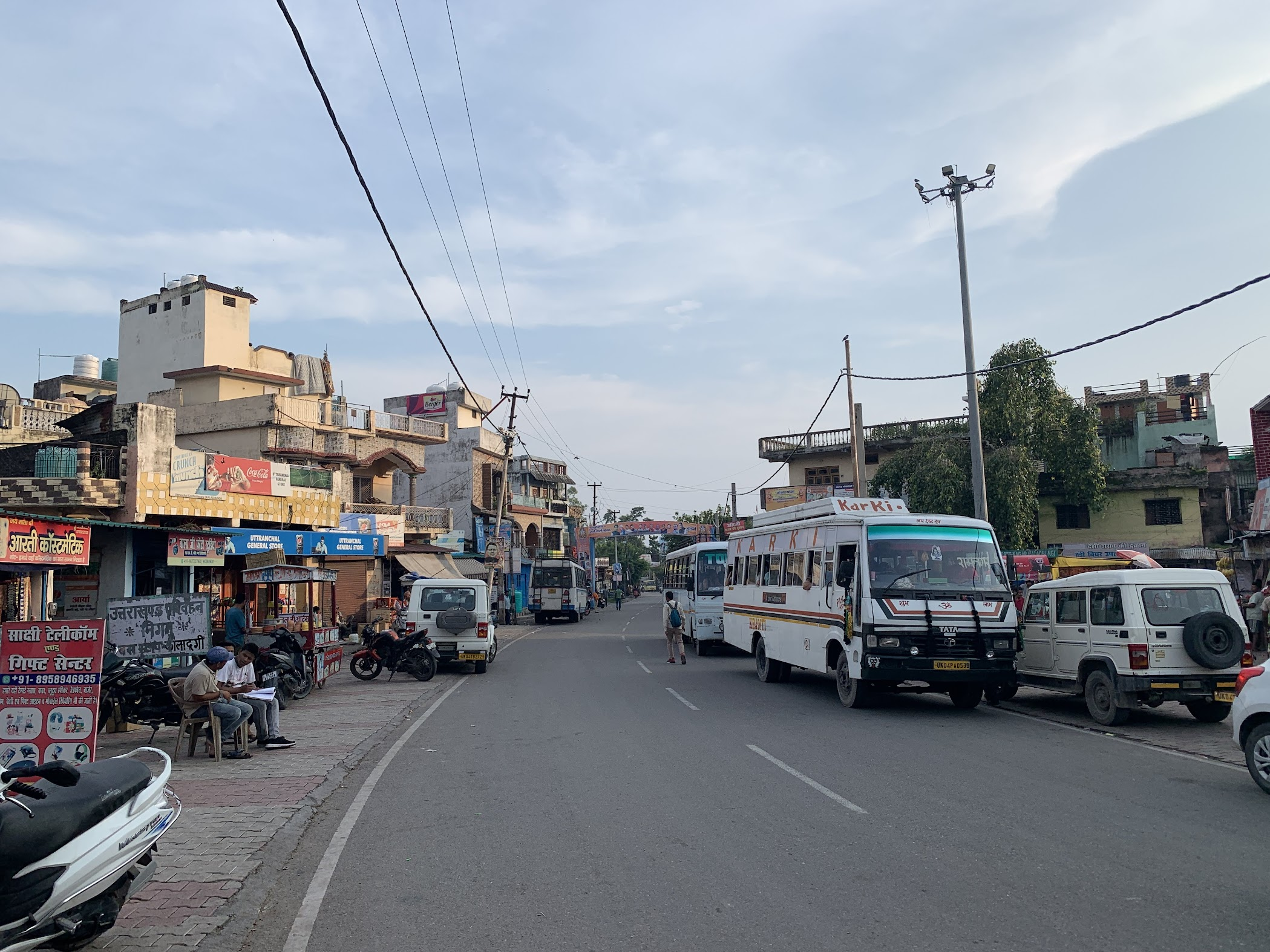
Kaladhungi Main Market

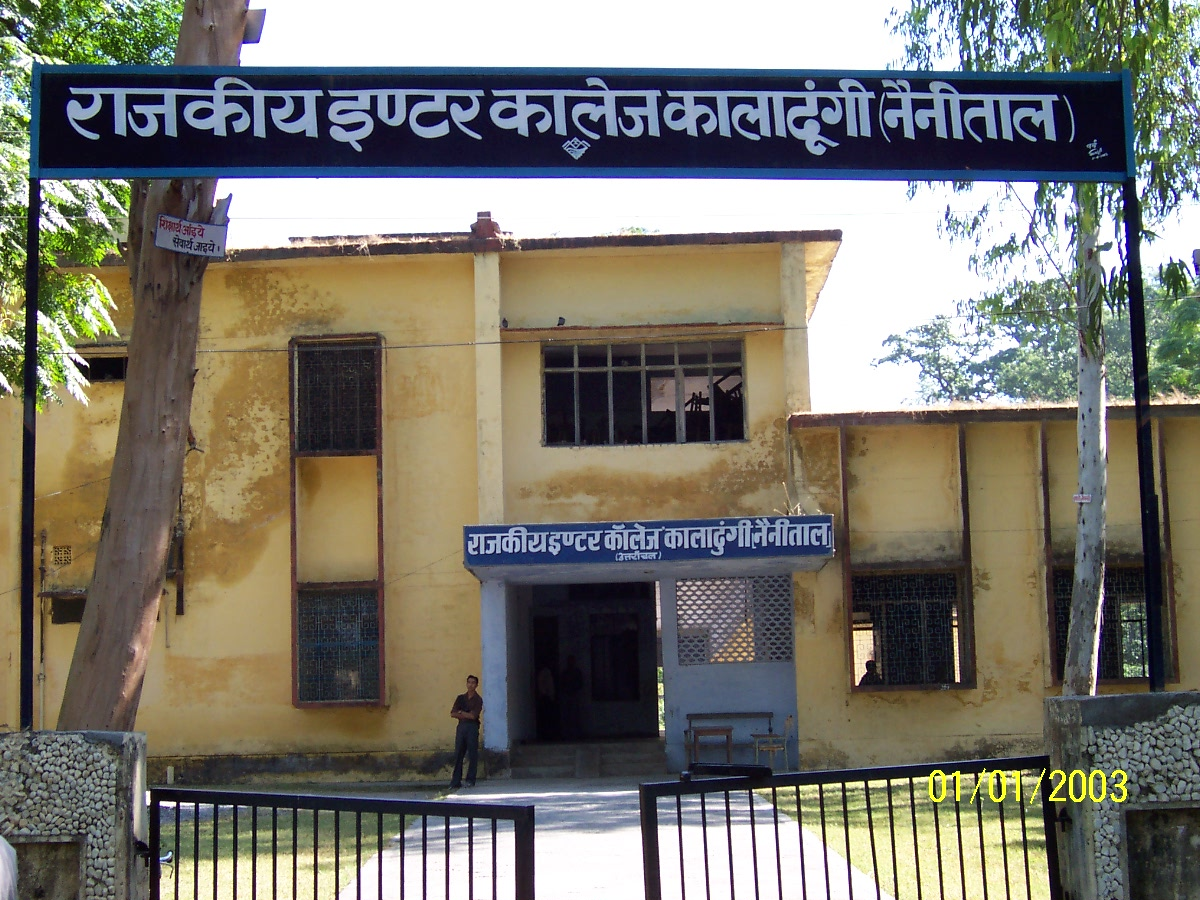
Picture of Government Inter College Kaladhungi taken in year 2003

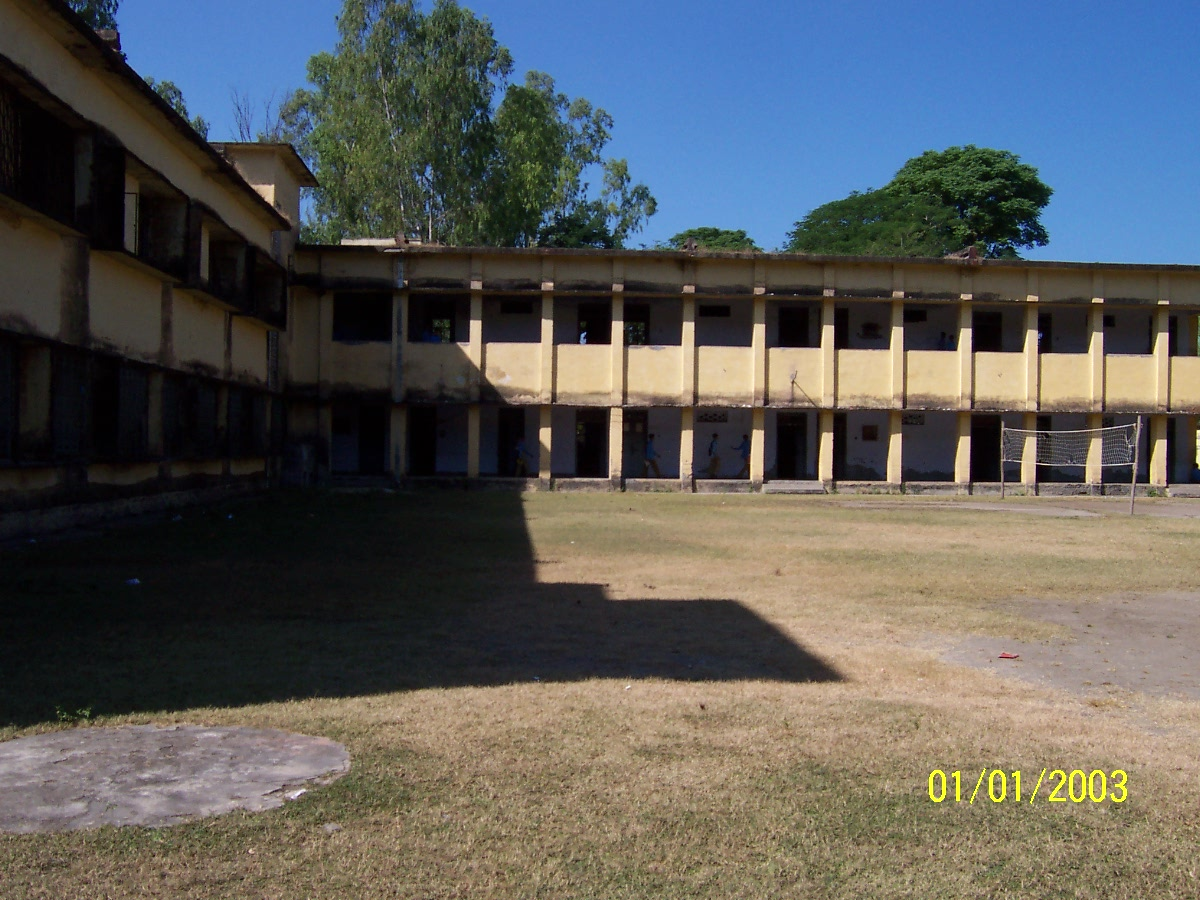
Main Ground of Government Inter College Kaladhungi taken in year 2003

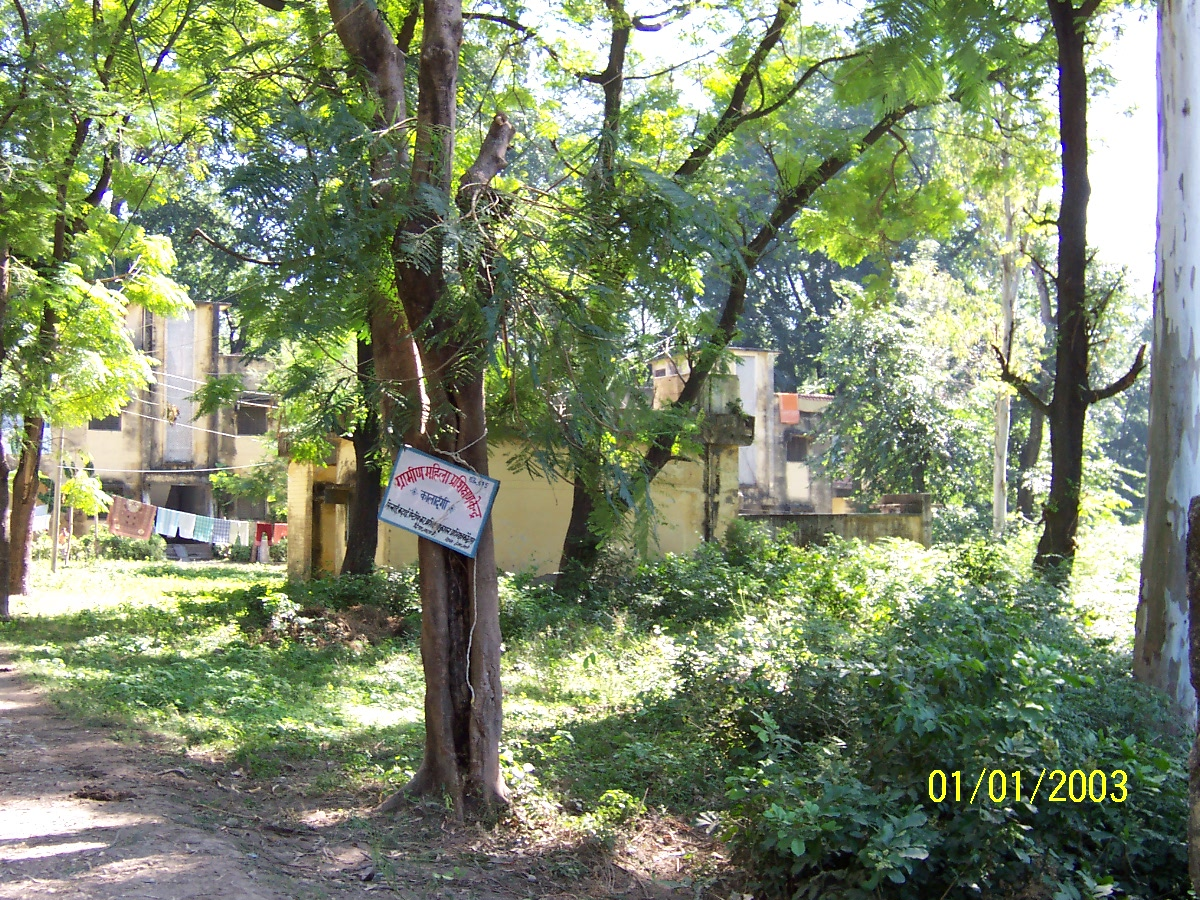
Teacher's Houses

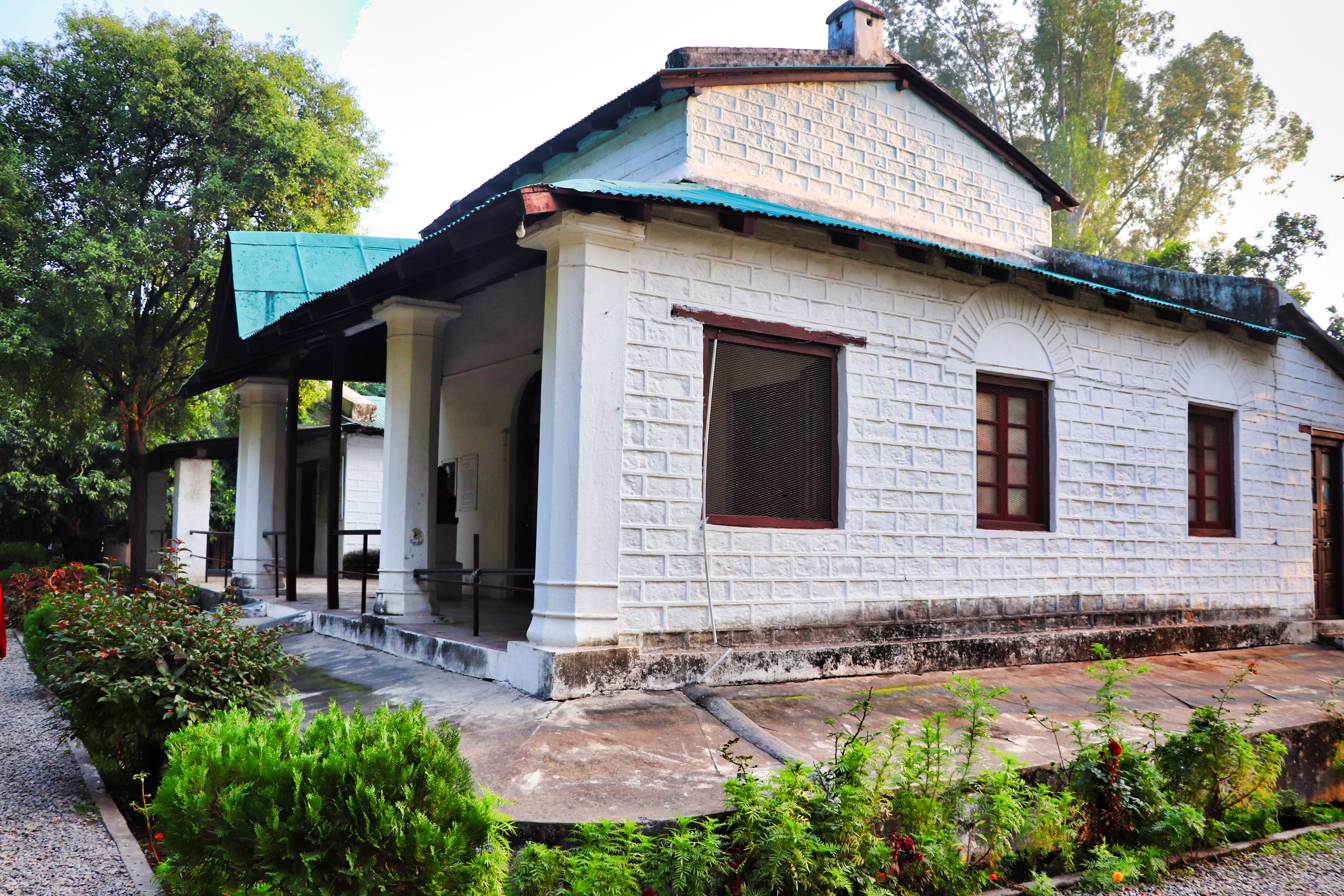
Corbett House at Corbett Museum, Kaladhungi
