= Uttarakhand Open University =

State Open University in Uttarakhand, Inda

- Other name: UOU
- Type: State university
- Established: 31 October 2005; 20 years ago
- Affiliations: DEB, UGC AIU
- Chancellor: Governor of Uttarakhand
- Vice-Chancellor: Naveen Chandra Lohani
- Location: University Bypass Road, Haldwani, Uttarakhand, 263139, India; 29.1863°N 79.5120°E
- Campus: rural
- Website: uou.ac.in

Uttarakhand Open University (Hindi: उत्तराखण्ड मुक्त विश्वविद्यालय) is a public state open University located in the city of Haldwani in the Indian state of Uttarakhand.

The university was established by an Act of Uttarakhand Legislative Assembly on 31 October 2005. UOU is recognized by Distance Education Bureau, University Grants Commission and listed in Association of Indian Universities.

University offers undergraduate and postgraduate programs. It also offers Phd Degrees but on a full-time basis as directed by UGC.

== MoU ==
The University has signed Memorandum of Understanding, or MoUs with Abhinav Knowledge Services, Tata Motors, Hiltron Calc, University18, IETS, IKC India and various others.

== Hello Haldwani community radio ==
Hello Haldwani is the Hindi language community radio station of the Uttarakhand Open University, accompanied by its website, which serves as an information portal and provides online access to radio broadcasts. The radio service is broadcast from Uttarakhand open university in Haldwani. The target audience are communities of Uttarakhand. The station began transmission on 2 November 2012. It airs its programmes in FM 91.2 MHz.
