= Dori Lal Agarawal Sports Stadium =

Multi-purpose stadium in Bareilly, India

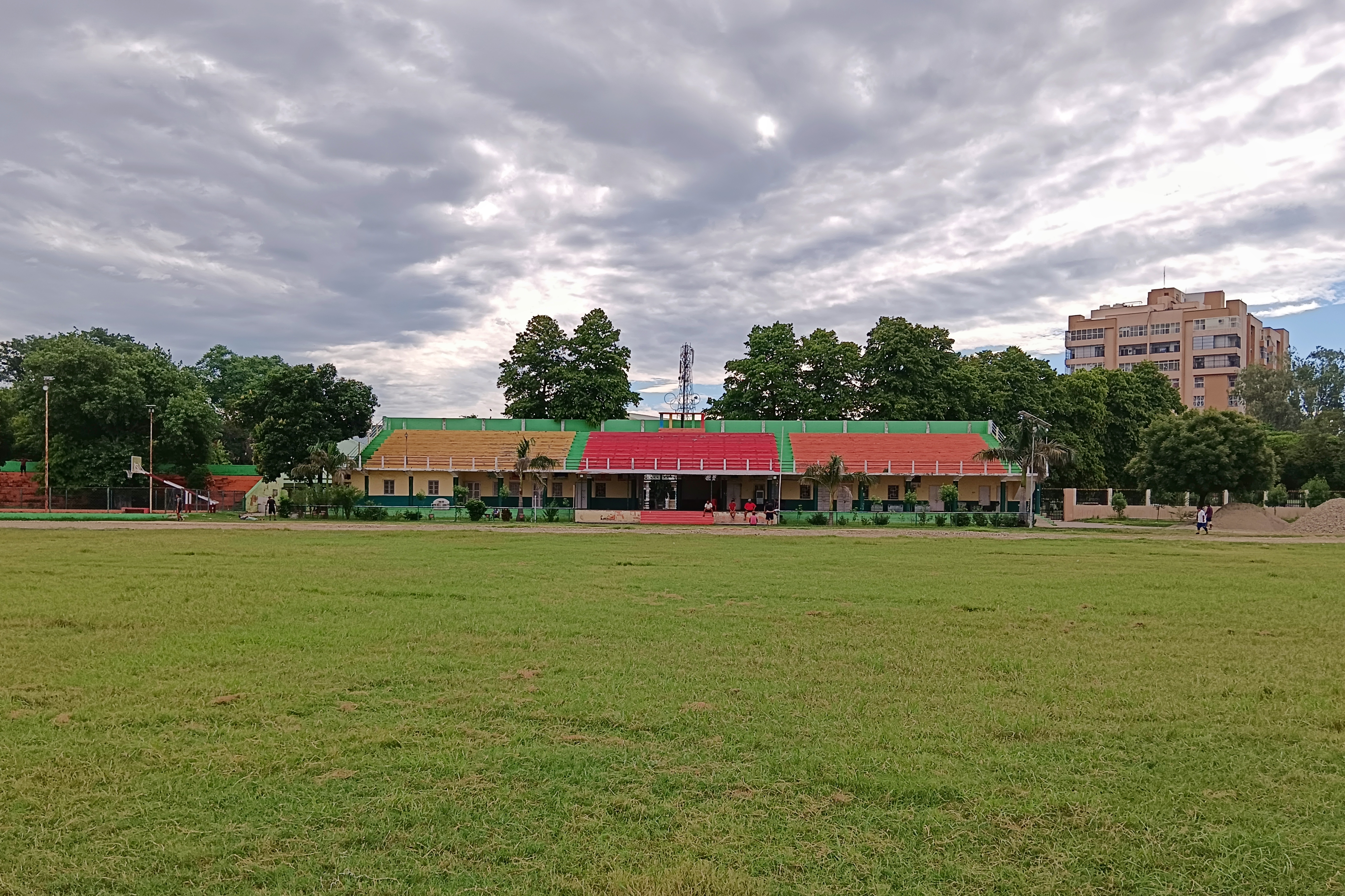
- Stadium Ground
- Interactive map of Dori Lal Agarawal Sports Stadium
- Full name: Dori Lal Agarawal Sports Stadium
- Former names: Regional Sports Stadium
- Location: Bareilly, Uttar Pradesh
- Coordinates: 28.37747°N 79.43171°E
- Owner: Government of Uttar Pradesh
- Operator: Government of Uttar Pradesh
- Capacity: 5,000

Construction
- Groundbreaking: 1960
- Opened: 1998 (First cricket match recorded)
- Renovated: 2015

Website
- ESPNcricinfo

Dori Lal Agarawal Sports Stadium or Regional Sports Stadium is a multi-purpose stadium in Bareilly, Uttar Pradesh. The ground is mainly used for organizing matches of football, cricket, netball, handball, basketball and other sports. The stadium was established in 1960 and has hosted international matches between India women's cricket team and Sri Lanka women's cricket team.

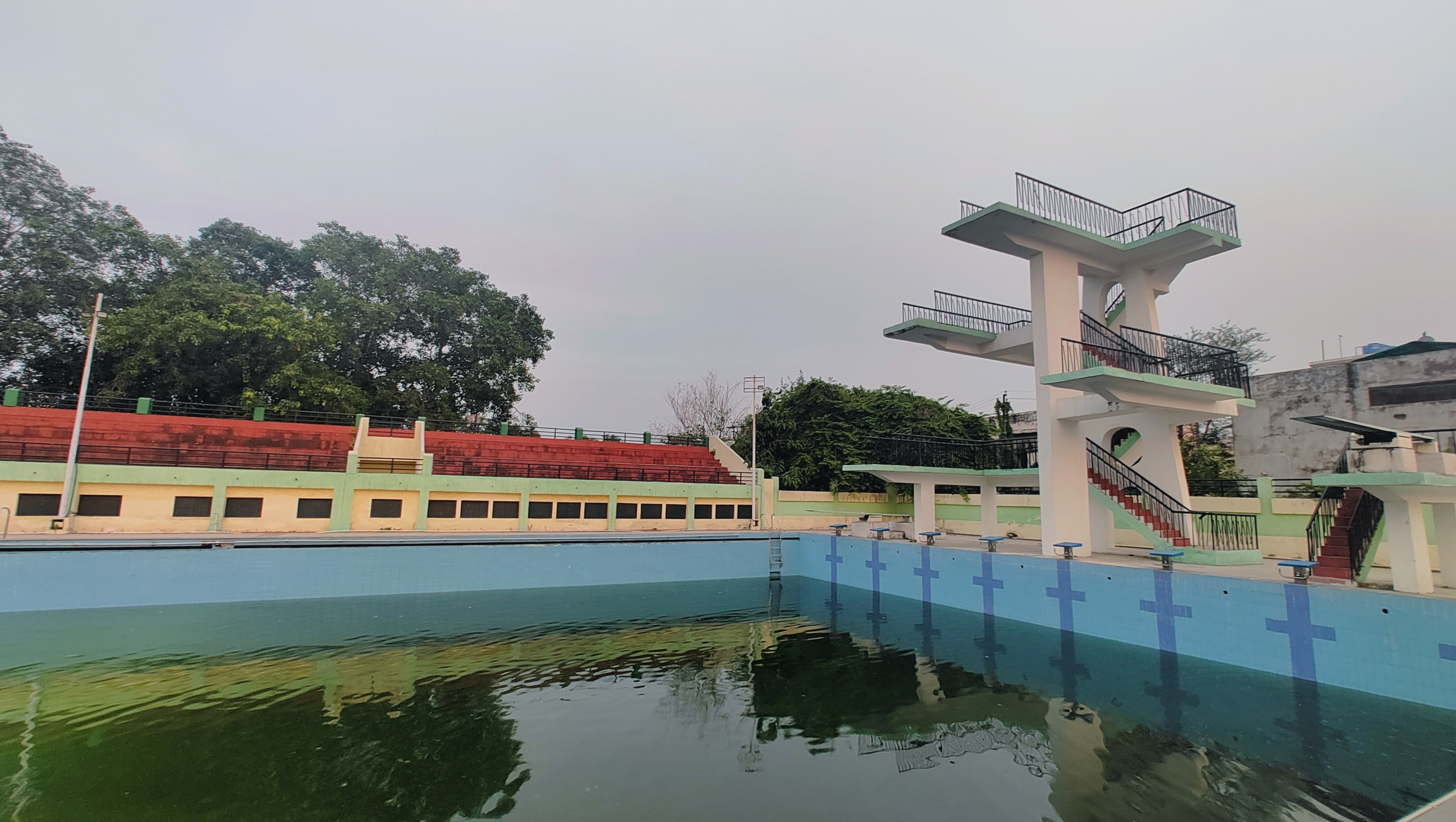
Swimming Pool

In 2015, the Government of Uttar Pradesh decided to upgrade the stadium's core via construction of a dormitory with 400 beds for both male and female players, as well as staircases.

In August 2015, the stadium hosted the Indian Gramin Cricket League, a local Twenty20 tournament for rural areas.

== Images ==
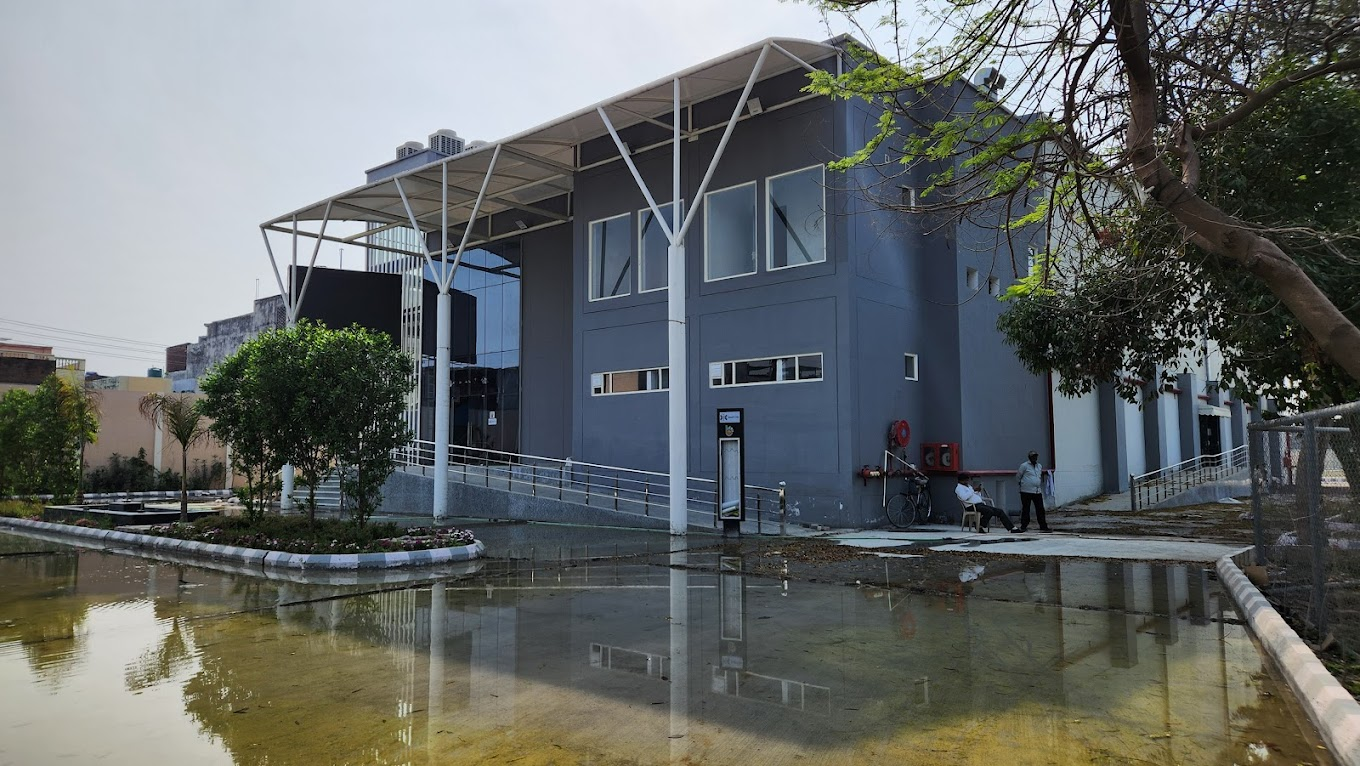
