= Manduadih–Jabalpur Express =

Express train

Overview
- Service type: Express
- First service: 6 December 2014; 10 years ago
- Current operator: North Eastern Railway zone

Route
- Termini: Manduadih (MUV); Jabalpur Junction (JBP)
- Stops: 8
- Distance travelled: 487 km (303 mi)
- Average journey time: 10h 15m
- Service frequency: Weekly (Note: Runs one day in a week for every direction.)
- Train number: 15117/15118

On-board services
- Classes: AC 2 tier, AC 3 tier, Sleeper class, General Unreserved
- Seating arrangements: No
- Sleeping arrangements: Yes
- Catering facilities: On-board catering E-catering
- Observation facilities: LHB coach
- Entertainment facilities: No
- Baggage facilities: No
- Other facilities: Below the seats

Technical
- Rolling stock: 2
- Track gauge: 1,676 mm (5 ft 6 in)
- Operating speed: 48 km/h (30 mph), including halts

The Manduadih–Jabalpur Express is an Express train belonging to North Eastern Railway zone that runs between Manduadih and Jabalpur Junction in India. It is currently being operated with 15117/15118 train numbers on a weekly basis.

== Service ==
The 15117/Manduadih–Jabalpur Express has an average speed of 48 km/h and covers 487 km in 10h 15m. The 15118/Jabalpur–Manduadih Express has an average speed of 46 km/h and covers 487 km in 10h 35m.

== Route and halts ==
The important halts of the train are:

- Manduadih
- Madhosingh
- Gyanpur Road
- Allahabad City
- Allahabad Junction
- Satna Junction
- Bhojipura Junction
- Maihar
- Katni Junction
- Sihora Road
- Jabalpur Junction

== Coach composition ==
The train has standard ICF rakes with a maximum speed of 110 km/h. The train consists of 13 coaches:

- 1 AC III Tier
- 4 Sleeper coaches
- 6 General Unreserved
- 2 Seating cum Luggage Rake

== Schedule ==
- Train runs ones in a week for either side.

Train number	Station code	Departure station	Departure time	Departure day	Arrival station	Arrival time	Arrival day
15117	MUV	Manduadih (Varanasi)	8:25 AM	Saturday	Jabalpur Junction	6:50 AM	Saturday
15118	JBP	Jabalpur Junction	10:00 AM	Sunday	Manduadih (Varanasi)	8:35 AM	Sunday

== Reversals ==
- Allahabad Junction

== Traction ==
Both trains are hauled by a Gonda Loco Shed-based WDM-3A or Itarsi Loco Shed-based WDP-4D diesel locomotive from Varanasi to Jabalpur and vice versa.

== Rake sharing ==
The train shares its rake with 12537/12538 Bapu Dham Superfast Express

== See also ==
- Jabalpur Junction railway station
- Manduadih railway station
