= Kashi Vishwanath Express =

Train in India

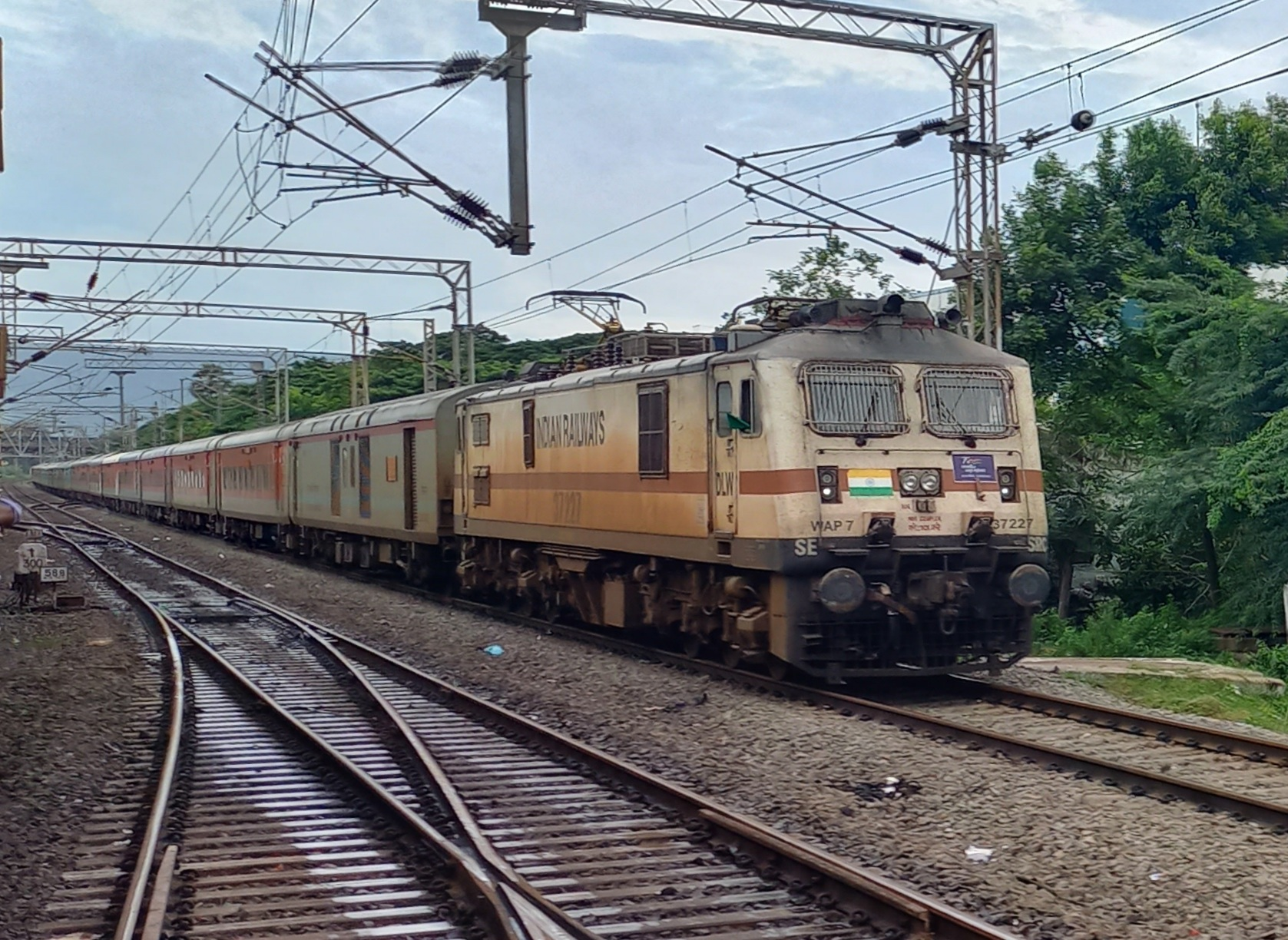
- Kashi Vishwanath Express at Raebareli.

Overview
- Service type: Express
- Locale: Delhi & Uttar Pradesh
- First service: 30 March 1975; 51 years ago
- Current operator: North Eastern Railway

Route
- Termini: New Delhi (NDLS); Banaras (BSBS)
- Stops: 33
- Distance travelled: 794 km (493 mi)
- Average journey time: 17 hours 05 minutes
- Service frequency: Daily
- Train number: 15127 / 15128

On-board services
- Classes: AC First Class, AC 2 Tier, AC 3 Tier, Sleeper class, General Unreserved
- Seating arrangements: Yes
- Sleeping arrangements: Yes
- Catering facilities: On-board catering, E-catering
- Observation facilities: Large windows
- Baggage facilities: Available
- Other facilities: Below the seats

Technical
- Rolling stock: LHB coach
- Track gauge: 1,676 mm (5 ft 6 in)
- Operating speed: 46 km/h (29 mph) average including halts.
Route map
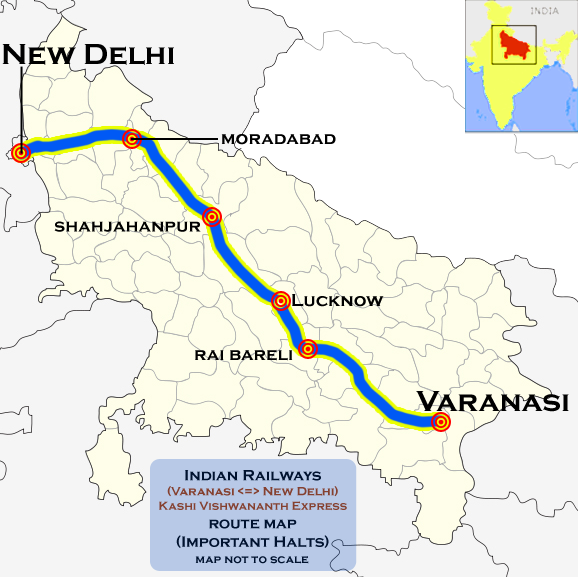

The 15127 / 15128 Kashi Vishwanath Express is an express train that runs between Banaras in Uttar Pradesh and New Delhi in Delhi. The train is named after the Kashi Vishwanath Temple in Varanasi.

== Time table ==
| Station | Sch. Arrival | Sch. Departure |
|---|---|---|
| New Delhi (NDLS) | Source | 11:35 |
| Ghaziabad (GZB) | 12:15 | 12:17 |
| Pilkhua (PKW) | 12:44 | 12:46 |
| Hapur (HPU) | 13:02 | 13:04 |
| Garhmuktesar (GMS) | 13:30 | 13:32 |
| Gajraula Jn (GJL) | 13:58 | 14:00 |
| Amroha (AMRO) | 14:28 | 14:30 |
| Moradabad (MB) | 15:07 | 15:15 |
| Rampur (RMU) | 15:43 | 15:45 |
| Bareilly (BE) | 16:44 | 16:46 |
| Tilhar (TLH) | 17:41 | 17:43 |
| Shahjehanpur (SPN) | 18:08 | 18:10 |
| Anjhi Shahabad (AJI) | 18:37 | 18:39 |
| Hardoi (HRI) | 19:04 | 19:06 |
| Balamu Jn (BLM) | 19:33 | 19:35 |
| Sandila (SAN) | 19:56 | 19:58 |
| Lucknow NR (LKO) | 21:05 | 21:20 |
| Bachhrawan (BCN) | 22:13 | 22:15 |
| Rae Bareli Jn (RBL) | 22:50 | 22:55 |
| Jais (JAIS) | 23:21 | 23:23 |
| Gauriganj (GNG) | 23:39 | 23:41 |
| Amethi (AME) | 23:55 | 23:57 |
| Antu (ANTU) | 00:12 | 00:13 |
| Partapgarh Jn (PBH) | 00:55 | 01:00 |
| Maa Barahi Devi Dham (MBDD) | 01:24 | 01:25 |
| Badshahpur (BSE) | 01:50 | 01:52 |
| Janghai Jn (JNH) | 02:09 | 02:11 |
| Suriawan (SAW) | 02:28 | 02:30 |
| Bhadohi (BOY) | 02:46 | 02:48 |
| Parsipur (PRF) | 02:59 | 03:00 |
| Sewapuri (SWPR) | 03:36 | 03:38 |
| Chaukhandi (CHH) | 03:57 | 03:58 |
| Banaras (BSBS) | 04:50 | Destination |

== Stops ==
- New Delhi
- Ghaziabad
- Pilkhuwa
- Hapur
- Gajraula Junction
- Amroha
- Moradabad
- Rampur
- Bareilly
- Pitambarpur
- Tilhar
- Shahjahanpur
- Anjhi Shahabad
- Hardoi
- Balamau
- Sandila
- Lucknow Junction
- Bachhrawan
- Rae Bareli Junction
- Gauriganj
- Amethi
- Antu
- Pratapgarh Junction
- Dandupur
- Badshahpur
- Janghai Junction
- Suriawan
- Bhadohi
- Parasipur
- Sewapuri
- Chaukhandi
- Banaras

Get Your Current pnr status

== Gallery ==
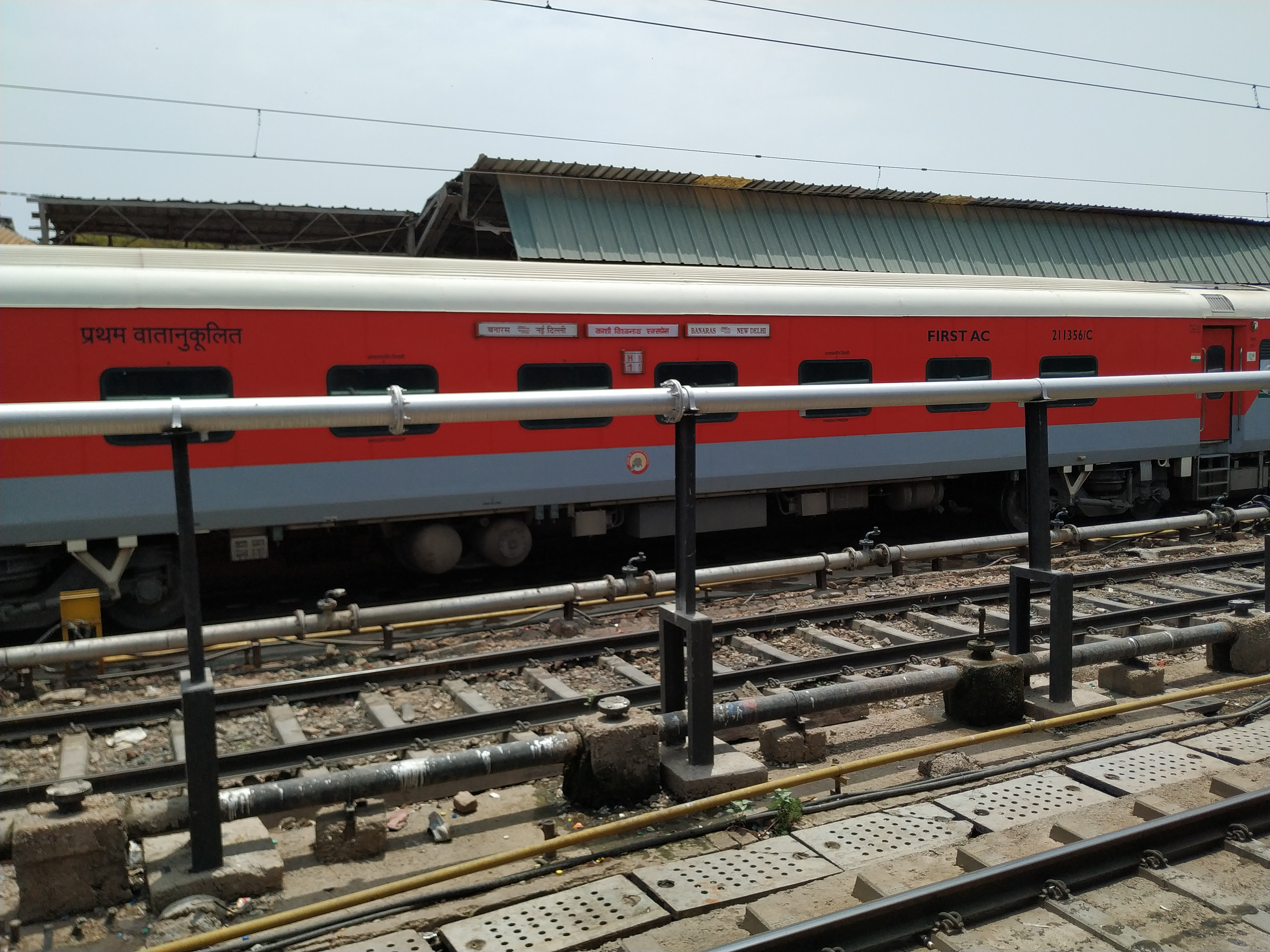
LHB coaches of 15128 Kashi Vishwanath Express

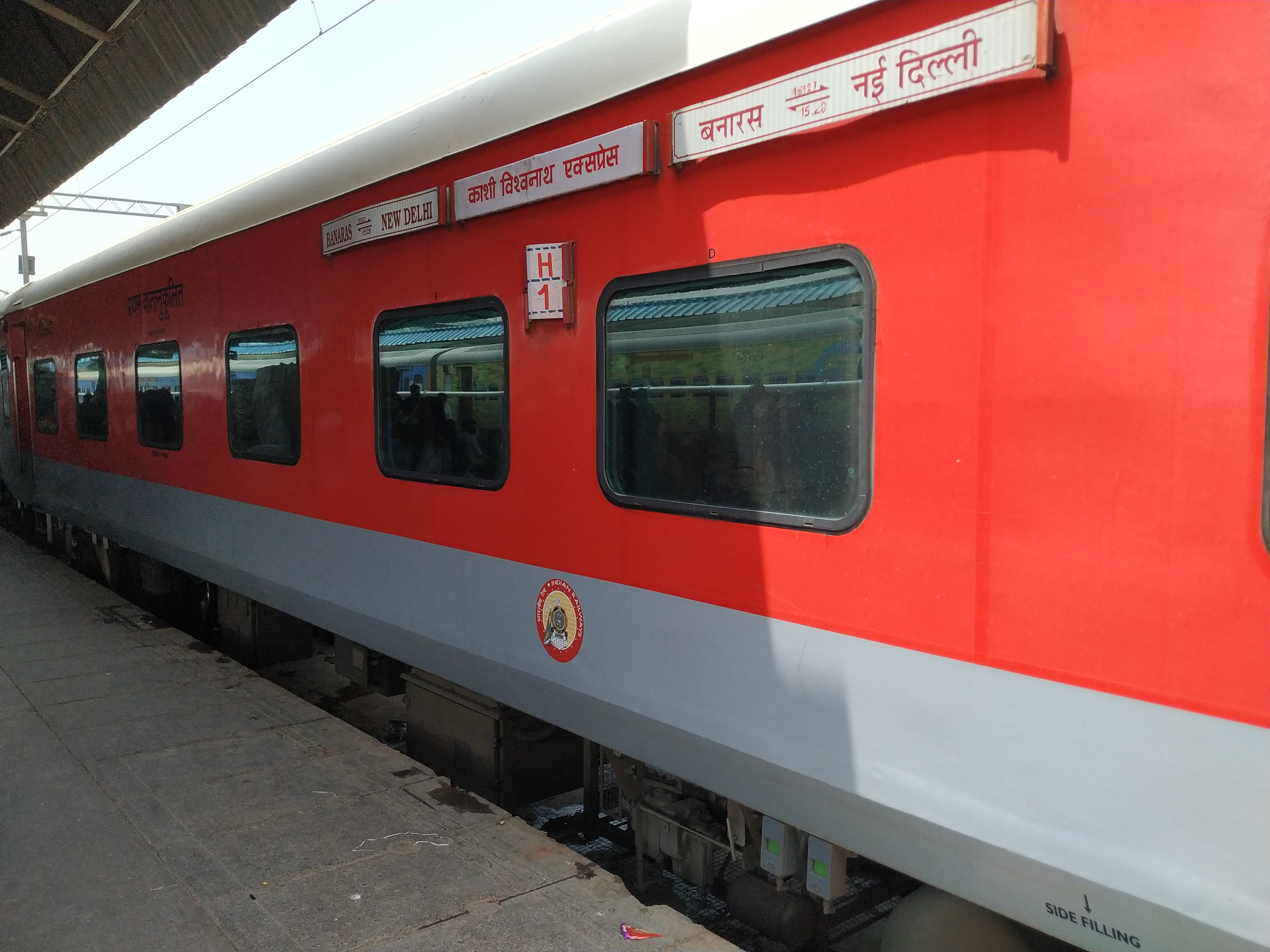
First class AC coach of Kashi Vishwanath Express

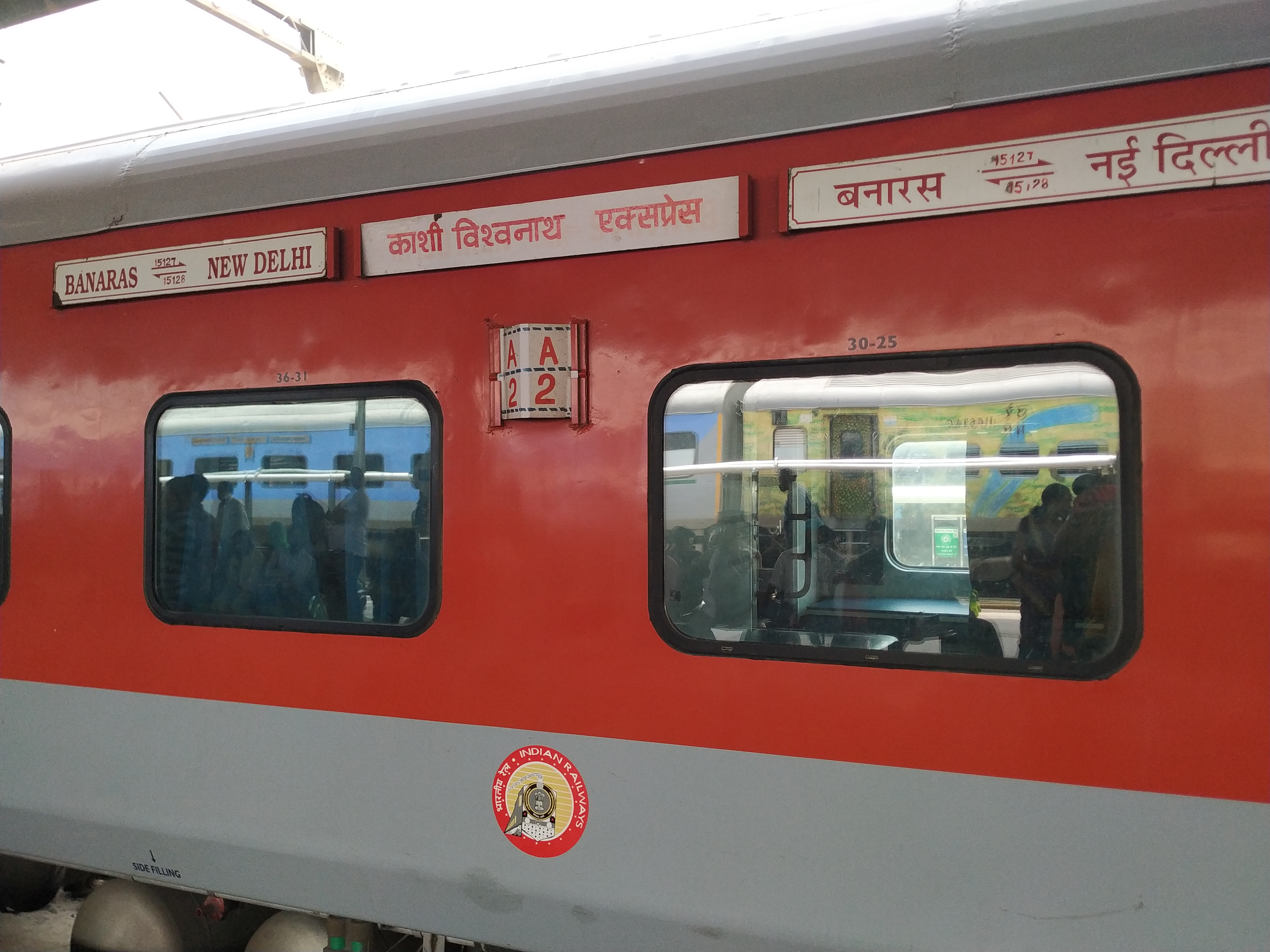
AC two tier coach of Kashi Vishwanath Express

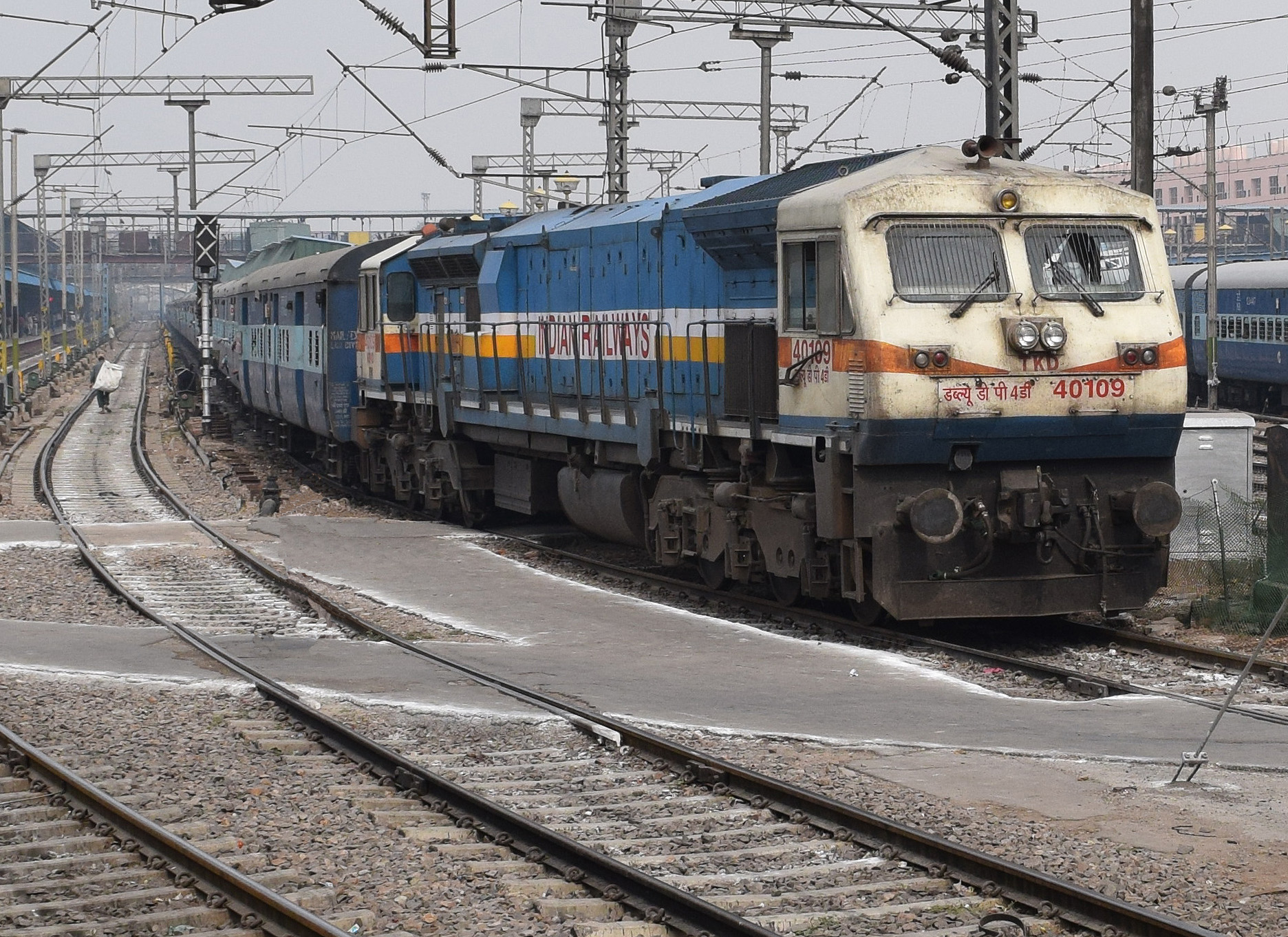
Earlier, Kashi Vishwanath Express used ICF coaches.

== See also ==
- Banaras railway station
