= Bhagalpur–New Delhi Weekly Superfast Express =

Train in India

Overview
- Service type: Superfast
- First service: 1 July 2007
- Current operator: Eastern Railways

Route
- Termini: Bhagalpur Junction (BGP); New Delhi (NDLS)
- Stops: 12
- Distance travelled: 1,220 km (758 mi)
- Average journey time: 21 hours 30 minutes
- Service frequency: Weekly (Note: Runs one day in a week for every direction.)
- Train number: 12349 / 12350

On-board services
- Classes: AC 2 tier, AC 3 tier, Sleeper Class, General Unreserved
- Seating arrangements: No
- Sleeping arrangements: Yes
- Catering facilities: On-board catering E-catering
- Observation facilities: Rake sharing with 13423/13424 Bhagalpur–Ajmer Express
- Baggage facilities: Below the seats

Technical
- Rolling stock: LHB coach
- Track gauge: 1,676 mm (5 ft 6 in)
- Operating speed: 56 km/h (35 mph) Avg. Speed
Route map
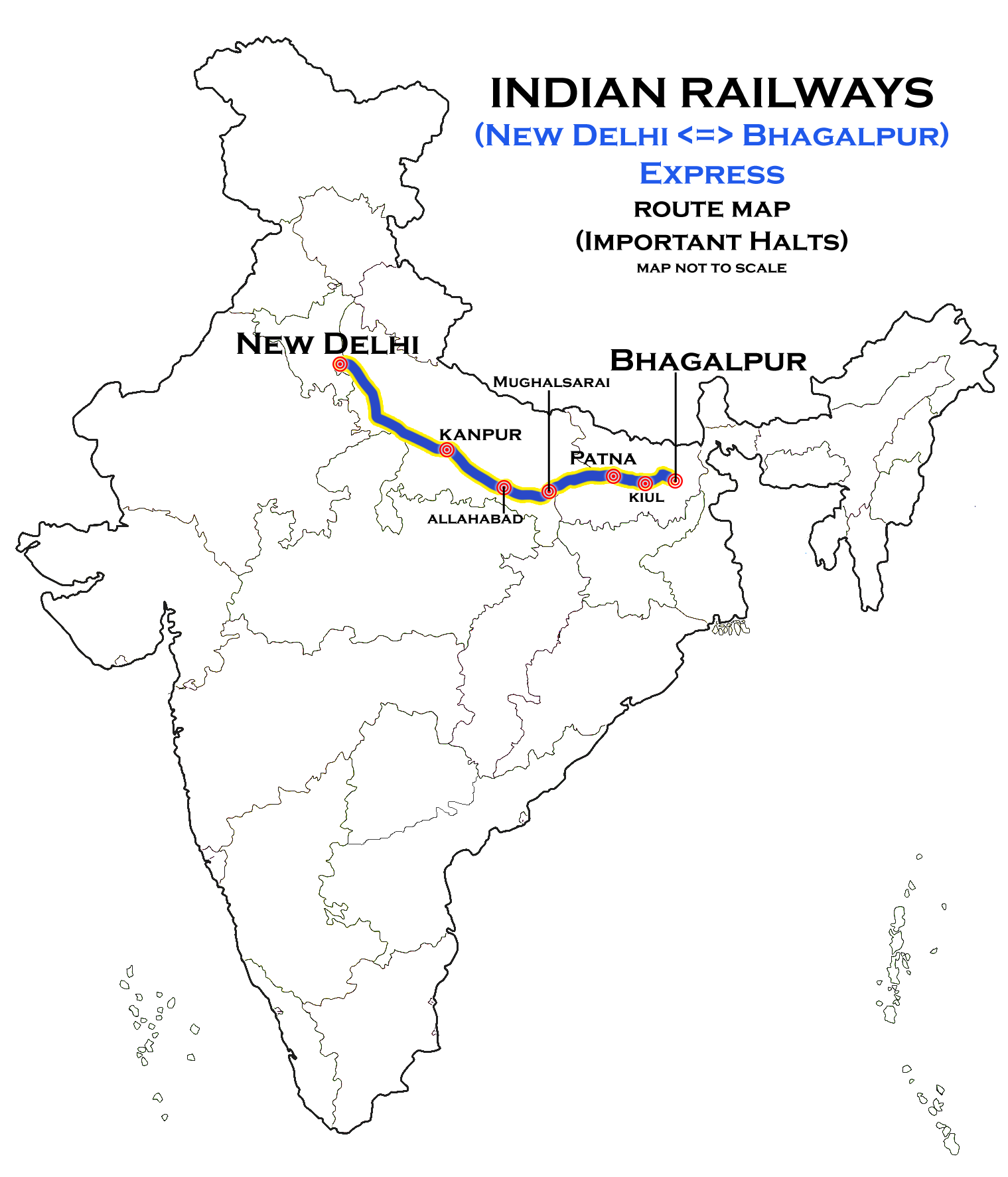

The 12349 / 12350 Bhagalpur–New Delhi Weekly Superfast Express is a Superfast train of the Indian Railways connecting Bhagalpur Junction in Bihar and New Delhi of Delhi. It is currently being operated with 12349/12350 train numbers on a weekly basis.

== Service ==
12349/Bhagalpur–New Delhi Weekly Superfast Express has average speed of 76 km/h and covers 1220 km in 21 hours 30 minutes. 12350/New Delhi–Bhagalpur Weekly Superfast Express has average speed of 73 km/h and covers 1220 km in 21 hrs 55 minutes. Previously this train was running via Patna Junction but from 18 March 2019 it is running via Gaya Junction. Instead of 17:30 hrs the train departed Bhagalpur junction at 15:30 hrs because time table of this train is changed from Bhagalpur Junction to Pandit Deen Dayal Upadhyay Junction. Also, it is running with LHB coach from 18 March from Bhagalpur Junction to New Delhi.

== Route and halts ==
The important halts of this train are:

- Bhagalpur Junction
- Sultanganj
- Jamalpur Junction
- Kiul Junction
- Nawada
- Gaya Junction
- Sasaram Junction
- Pandit Deen Dayal upadhyay Junction
- Allahabad Junction
- Kanpur Central
- New Delhi
- Note:- 12350 has no stop at Sultanganj.

== Coach composition ==
The train has Advanced LHB rakes with a maximum speed of 160 km/h. The train consists of 22 LHB coach:

- 2 AC II Tier
- 3 AC III Tier
- 11 sleeper coaches
- 4 general
- 2 EOGs

== Traction ==
Both trains are hauled by a Howrah-based WAP-7 electric locomotive from Bhagalpur to New Delhi and vice versa.

== Rake sharing ==
The train shares its rake with 13423/13424 Bhagalpur–Ajmer Express.

== See also ==
- Bhagalpur Junction railway station
- New Delhi railway station
- Bhagalpur–Ajmer Express
