= Bhrigu Superfast Express =

Train in India

Overview
- Service type: Superfast
- First service: 28 October 2016; 9 years ago
- Current operator: Northern Railway

Route
- Termini: Ballia (BUI); Anand Vihar Terminal (ANVT)
- Stops: 8
- Distance travelled: 886 km (551 mi)
- Average journey time: 14 hrs 15 mins
- Service frequency: Weekly (Note: Runs one day in a week for every direction.)
- Train number: 22427 / 22428

On-board services
- Classes: AC 2 Tier, AC 3 Tier, Sleeper Class, General Unreserved
- Seating arrangements: No
- Sleeping arrangements: Yes
- Catering facilities: On-board catering E-catering
- Observation facilities: Large windows
- Baggage facilities: No
- Other facilities: Below the seats

Technical
- Rolling stock: LHB coach
- Track gauge: 1,676 mm (5 ft 6 in)
- Operating speed: 62 km/h (39 mph) average including halts.

The 22427 / 22428 Bhrigu Superfast Express is a superfast express train belonging to Northern Railway zone that runs between Ballia and Anand Vihar Terminal in India. It is currently being operated with 22427/22428 Train numbers on a weekly basis.

The train is named after Bhrigu who was one of the seven great sages, the Saptarishi, one of the many Prajapatis created by Brahma.

== Service ==
The 22427/04049 Bhrigu Superfast Express has an average speed of 62 km/h and covers 886 km in 14h 15m. The 22428/04050 Bhrigu Superfast Express has an average speed of 63 km/h and covers 886 km in 14h 10m.

== Route and halts ==
The important halts of the train are :

- Ballia
- Ghazipur City
- Varanasi Junction
- Banaras
- Gyanpur Road
- Allahabad Junction
- Kanpur Central
- Aligarh Junction
- Anand Vihar Terminal

== Coach composition ==
The train has LHB rakes with a maximum speed of 130 km/h. The train consists of 21 coaches:

- 1 AC II Tier
- 4 AC III Tier
- 9 Sleeper coaches
- 5 General Unreserved
- 1 Sitting Cum Liggage Car
- 1 Generator Power Car

== Traction ==
It is hauled by a Ghaziabad Loco Shed-based WAP-7 electric locomotive from Ballia to Anand Vihar Terminal and vice versa.

== See also ==
- Ballia railway station
- Anand Vihar Terminal railway station
