= Pune–Manduadih Gyan Ganga Express =

Train in India

Pune–Banaras Gyan Ganga Express
Overview
- Service type: Superfast
- First service: 5 March 1996; 30 years ago
- Current operator: Central Railway

Route
- Termini: Pune (PUNE); Banaras (BSBS)
- Stops: 19
- Distance travelled: 1,538 km (956 mi)
- Average journey time: 27 hrs 5 mins
- Service frequency: Weekly
- Train number: 22131 / 22132

On-board services
- Classes: AC 2 Tier, AC 3 Tier, Sleeper Class, General Unreserved
- Seating arrangements: Yes
- Sleeping arrangements: Yes
- Catering facilities: Available
- Observation facilities: Large windows
- Baggage facilities: Available
- Other facilities: Below the seats

Technical
- Rolling stock: ICF coach
- Track gauge: 1,676 mm (5 ft 6 in)
- Operating speed: 57 km/h (35 mph) average including halts.
Route map
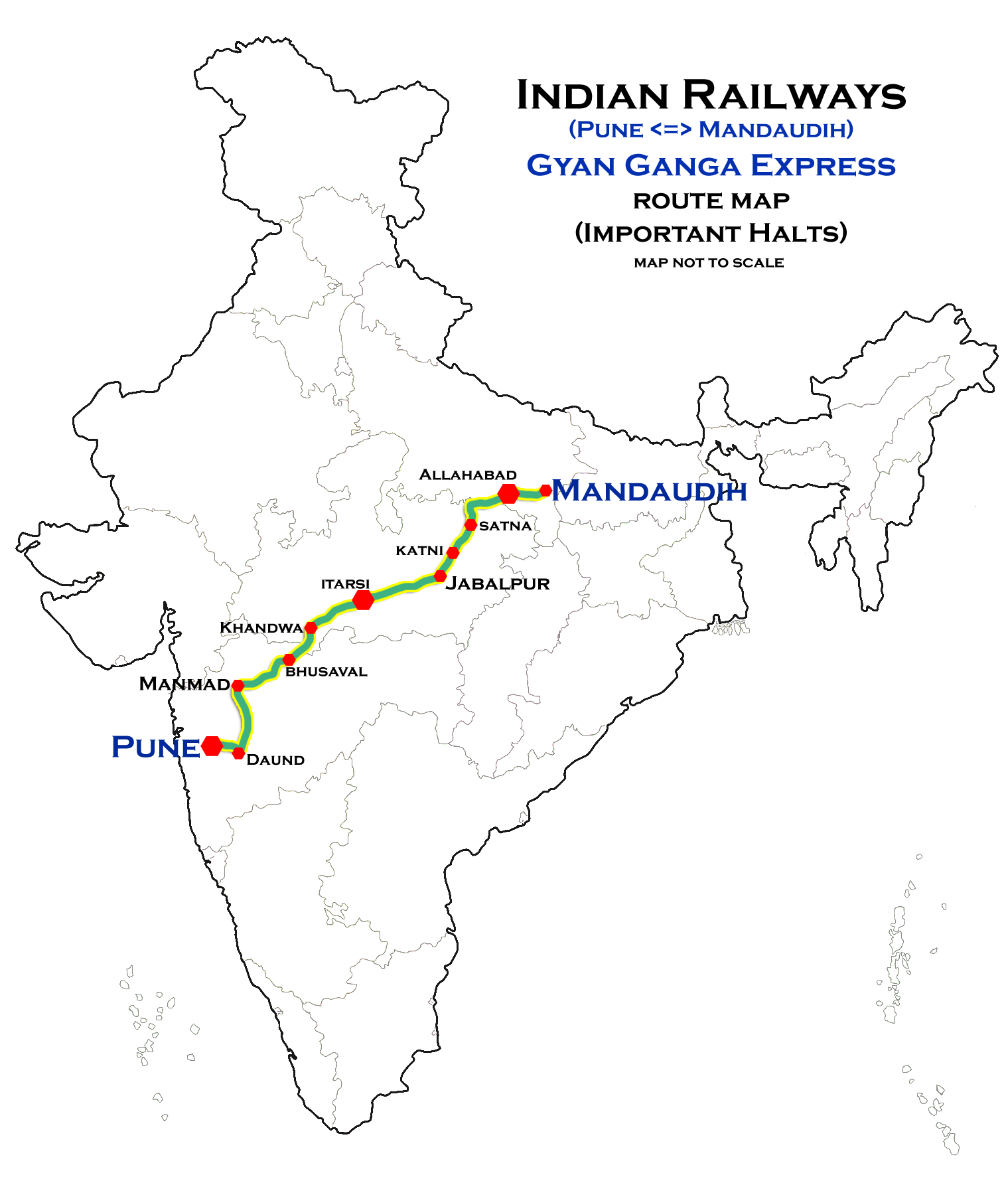

The 22131 / 22132 Pune–Banaras Gyan Ganga Express is the superfast express train which connect Pune in Maharashtra and Banaras in Varanasi, Uttar Pradesh, India. During its travel it covers a distance of 1,538 kilometres (956 mi), for that it takes 27 hrs 5 mins. It runs with an average speed of 56 km/h (35 mph). During its journey it covers 17 halts and passes 192 intermediate stations.

== Coaches ==
The train has standard ICF rakes with Max Permissible Speed of 110 kilometres per hour (68 mph).

- 1 AC I Tier
- 3 AC III Tier
- 13 Sleeper coaches
- 2 General
- 2 Second-class Luggage/parcel van
- 1 PC

Loco	1	2	3	4	5	6	7	8	9	10	11	12	13	14	15	16	17	18	19	20	21	22
	SLR	GEN	S13	S12	S11	S10	S9	S8	S7	S6	S5	S4	S3	S2	PC	S1	B3	B2	B1	A1	GEN	SLR

== Schedule ==
Runs only one day from either side.

Train number	Station code	Departure station	Departure time	Departure day	Arrival station	Arrival time	Arrival day
22131	PUNE	Pune	4:15 PM	Monday	Banaras	7:20 PM	Tuesday
22132	BSBS	Banaras	4:15 AM	Wednesday	Pune	8:05 AM	Thursday

== Route and halts ==
- Pune
- Daund Junction
- Manmad
- Bhusaval
- Khandwa
- Itarsi Junction
- Narsinghpur
- Jabalpur Junction
- Katni Junction
- Satna
- Prayagraj Junction
- Gyanpur Road
- Banaras

== Reversals ==
The train reverses its direction 1 times at;

- PRYJ – Prayagraj Junction

== TRACTION ==
1. As the route is fully electrified the train runs fully with Indian locomotive class WAP-4 without any change

== RSA – Rake sharing ==
11037/11038 – Pune–Gorakhpur Express

== Features ==
Initially it uses train No. 22131 for its journey from Pune Junction to Banaras, and train no. 22132 for its journey from Banaras to Pune Junction.

On 3 August 2011 the train numbers for Gyan Ganga Express changed to #22131 for Train #11031 and to 22132 from Train #11032.
