= Kashi Tamil Sangam Express =

Train in India

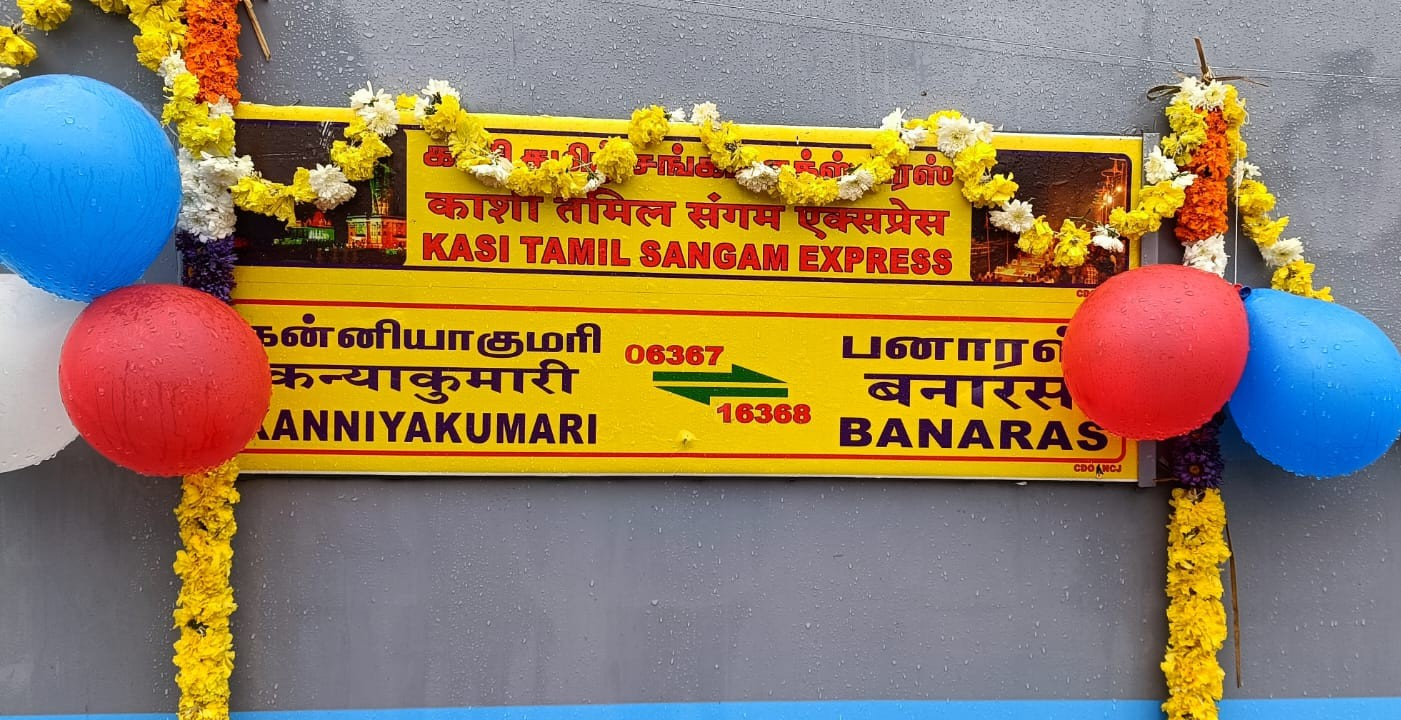
- Kashi Tamil Sangam Express train board.

Overview
- Service type: Express
- First service: 17 December 2023; 2 years ago
- Current operator: Southern Railway

Route
- Termini: Kanyakumari (CAPE); Banaras (BNRS)
- Stops: 36
- Distance travelled: 2,766 km (1,719 mi)
- Average journey time: 51 hours 05 minutes
- Service frequency: Weekly
- Train number: 16367 / 16368

On-board services
- Classes: AC First Class, AC 2 Tier, AC 3 Tier, AC 3 Tier Economy, Sleeper Class, General Unreserved
- Seating arrangements: Yes
- Sleeping arrangements: Yes
- Catering facilities: Available
- Observation facilities: Large Windows
- Baggage facilities: Available
- Other facilities: Below the seats

Technical
- Rolling stock: LHB coach
- Track gauge: 1,676 mm (5 ft 6 in)
- Operating speed: 54 km/h (34 mph) average including halts.

The 16367 / 16368 Kashi Tamil Sangam Express is an express train belonging to Indian Railways – Southern Railway zone that runs between Kanniyakumari and Banaras in India.

== Background ==
On account of Kashi Tamil Sangamam Event, this train service is announced by the Railway Minister Ashwini Vaishaw on 22 December 2022 and followed by this train has been Inaugurated by Prime Minister of India Narendra Modi on 17 December 2023.

It operates as train number 16367 from Kanyakumari to Banaras and as train number 16368 in the reverse direction, serving the states of Tamil Nadu, Andhra Pradesh, Telangana, Maharashtra, Madhya Pradesh & Uttar Pradesh.

== Coaches ==
The 16367 / 16368 Kashi Tamil Sangam Express has one AC 1 tier, two AC 2 tier, Three AC 3 tier, Three AC 3 tier Economy, six Sleeper Class, four General Unreserved, one Pantry car and 2 EOG coaches.

== Route & halts ==
- Kanyakumari
- Nagercoil Junction
- Tirunelveli Junction
- Madurai Junction
- Tiruchirappalli Junction
- Thanjavur Junction
- Viluppuram Junction
- Chengalpattu Junction
- Arakkonam Junction
- Chennai Perambur
- Vijayawada Junction
- Warangal
- Balharshah Junction
- Gondia Junction
- Balaghat
- Nainpur
- Jabalpur Junction
- Katni Junction
- Satna
- Manikpur
- Prayagraj Chheoki
- Varanasi Junction
- Banaras.

== Traction ==
It is hauled by a Royapuram Loco Shed based WAP-7 electric locomotive on its entire journey.
