= GKC =

GKC may refer to:

- Greater Kansas City, a metropolitan area at the Missouri/Kansas Border in the United States of America
- G. K. Chesterton (1874–1936), English writer
- Gesenius–Kautsch–Cowley, a Hebrew lexicon
- Gorakhpur Cantonment railway station, in Uttar Pradesh, India
- Govinda K.C., Nepalese physician
- Greenock Central railway station, in Scotland
- Gunnerkrigg Court, a science-fantasy webcomic
