= Bhagalpur–Ajmer Express =

Train in India

Bhagalpur–Ajmer Humsafar Express
Overview
- Service type: Humsafar Express
- First service: 15 March 2012; 14 years ago
- Current operator: Eastern Railway

Route
- Termini: Bhagalpur (BGP); Ajmer Junction (ALL)
- Stops: 19
- Distance travelled: 1,749 km (1,087 mi)
- Average journey time: 33 hours 30 minutes
- Service frequency: Weekly
- Train number: 13423 / 13424

On-board services
- Classes: AC 2 tier, AC 3 tier, Sleeper class, General Unreserved
- Seating arrangements: No
- Sleeping arrangements: Yes
- Catering facilities: On-board catering, E-catering
- Observation facilities: Rake sharing with 12349/12350 Bhagalpur–New Delhi Weekly Superfast Express
- Baggage facilities: No
- Other facilities: Below the seats

Technical
- Rolling stock: LHB coach
- Track gauge: 1,676 mm (5 ft 6 in)
- Operating speed: 52 km/h (32 mph) average including halts.
Route map
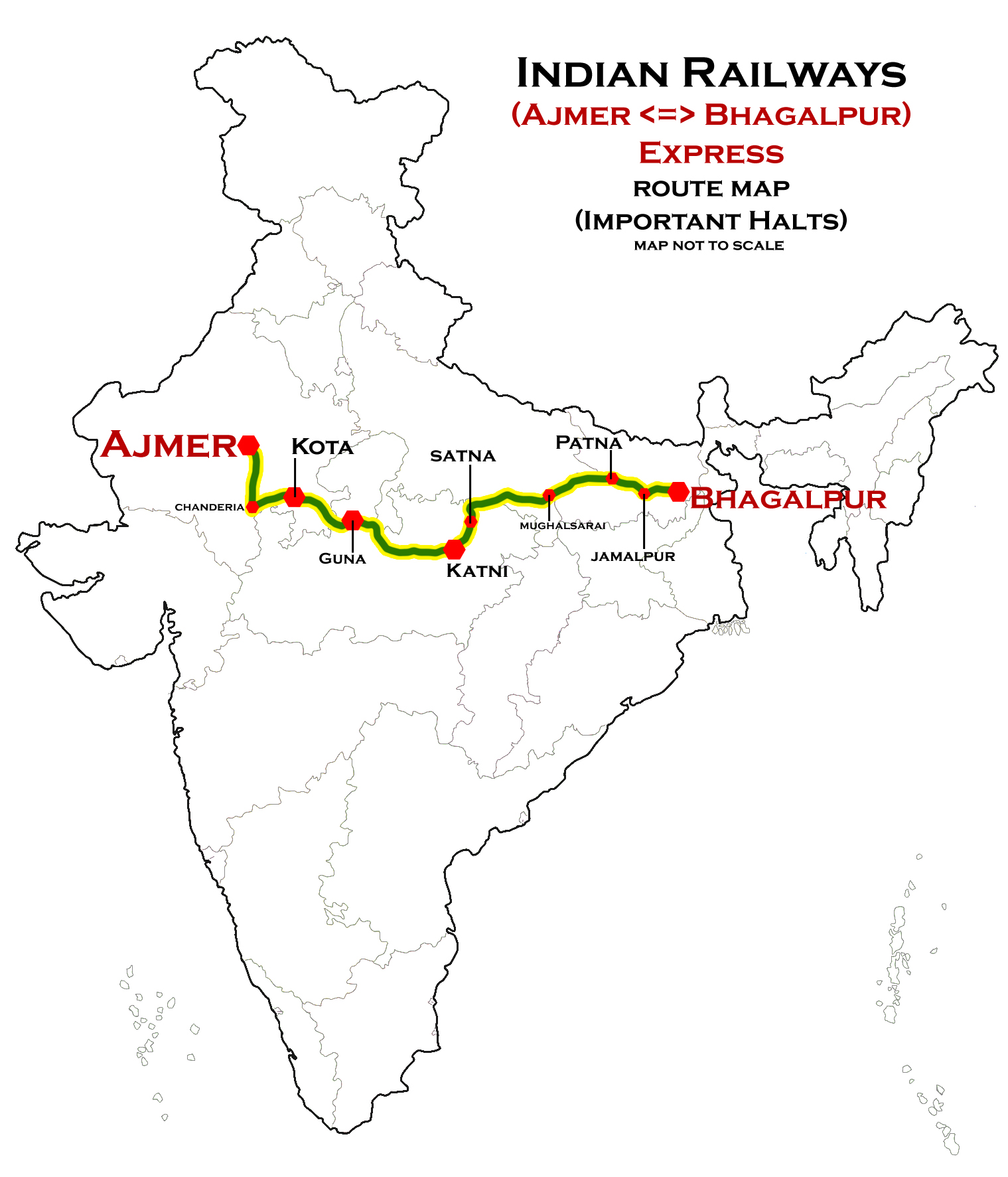

The 13423 / 13424 Bhagalpur–Ajmer Humsafar Express is a Humsafar Express train belonging to Eastern Railway zone that runs between Bhagalpur Junction and Ajmer Junction in India. It is currently being operated with 13423/13424 train numbers on a weekly basis.

== Service ==
The 13423/Bhagalpur–Ajmer Express has an average speed of 50 km/h and covers 1749 km in 34h 50m. The 13424/Ajmer–Bhagalpur Weekly Express has an average speed of 49 km/h and covers 1749 km in 35h 35m.

== Route & halts ==
The important halts of the train are:

- Bhagalpur Junction
- Jamalpur Junction
- Kiul Junction
- Mokama Junction
- Patna Junction
- Pandit Deen Dayal upadhyay Junction
- Allahabad Chheoki Junction
- Satna Junction
- Katni Junction
- Damoh
- Saugor
- Guna Junction
- Kota Junction
- Chanderiya
- Bhilwara
- Bijainagar
- Nasirabad
- Ajmer Junction

== Coach composition ==
The train has advanced LHB rakes with max speed of 130 kmph. The train consists of 22 coaches:

- 19 AC III Tier
- 1 Pantry car
- 2 EOGs

== Traction ==
earlier they hauled by a WDM-3A. Both trains are hauled by a Howrah Loco Shed-based WAP-7 locomotive from Bhagalpur to Ajmer Junction and vice versa.

== Direction reversal ==
Train reverses its direction 2 times:

- Chanderiya
- Kota Junction

== Rake sharing ==
The train shares its rake with 12349/12350 Godda–New Delhi Humsafar Express

== Notes ==
https://indiarailinfo.com/train/-train-bhagalpur-ajmer-weekly-humsafar-express-13423/17079/1156/280
