= Veraval–Banaras Weekly Superfast Express =

Train in India

Veraval – Banaras Superfast Express
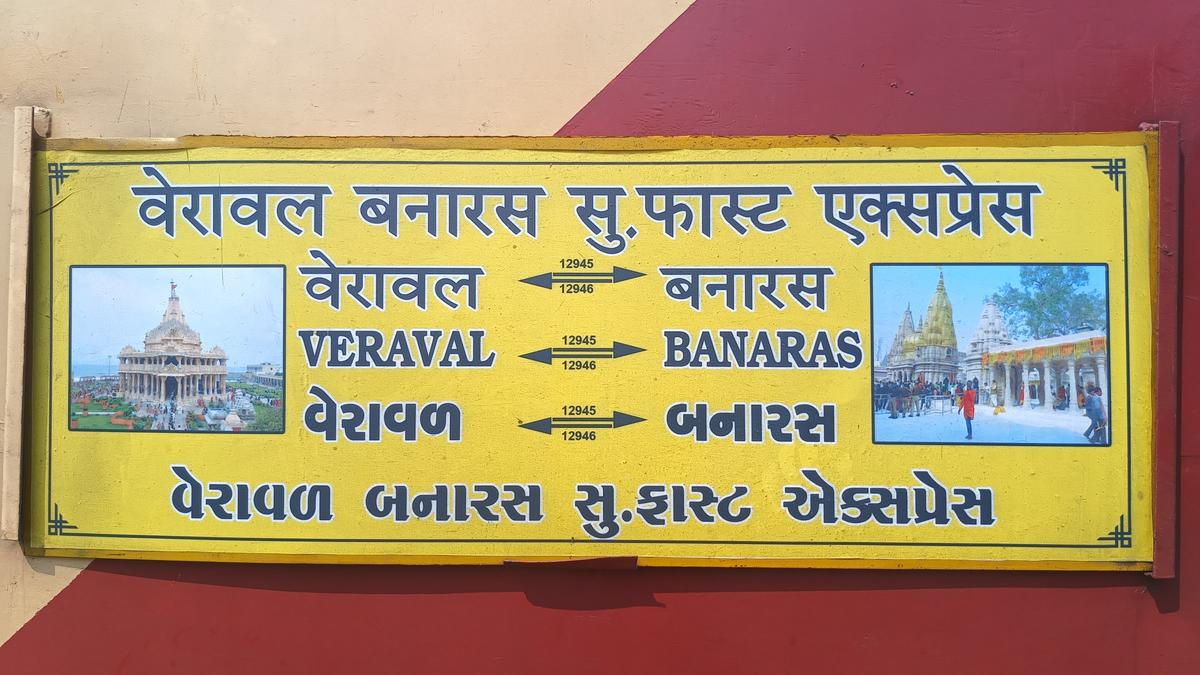

Overview
- Service type: Superfast
- First service: September 2023; 2 years ago
- Current operator: Western Railway

Route
- Termini: Veraval Junction (VRL); Banaras (BSBS)
- Stops: 27
- Distance travelled: 1,972 km (1,225 mi)
- Average journey time: 34 hrs 05 mins
- Service frequency: Weekly (Note: Runs one day in a week for every direction.)
- Train number: 12945 / 12946

On-board services
- Classes: AC First, AC 2 tier, AC 3 tier, Sleeper class, General Unreserved
- Seating arrangements: Yes
- Sleeping arrangements: Yes
- Catering facilities: Pantry car, On-board catering, E-catering
- Observation facilities: Large windows
- Baggage facilities: No
- Other facilities: Below the seats

Technical
- Rolling stock: LHB coach
- Track gauge: 1,676 mm (5 ft 6 in)
- Operating speed: 57 km/h (35 mph) average including halts.

The 12945 / 12946 Veraval–Banaras Superfast Express is an Superfast Express train belonging to Western Railway zone that runs between Veraval Junction and Banaras in India.

== Route and halts ==
The important stops of the train are:

- Veraval Junction
- Junagadh Junction
- Jetalsar Junction
- Botad Junction
- Sarkhej
- Ahmedabad Junction
- Nadiad Junction
- Anand Junction
- Chhayapuri
- Godhra Junction
- Ratlam Junction
- Nagda Junction
- Shamgarh
- Kota Junction
- Gangapur City
- Agra Fort
- Tundla Junction
- Etawah Junction
- Govindpuri
- Prayagraj Junction
- Banaras

== Schedule ==
Train number	Station code	Departure station	Departure time	Departure day	Arrival station	Arrival time	Arrival day
12945	VRL	Veraval Junction	04:30 AM	Monday	Banaras	14:35 PM	Tuesday
12946	BSBS	Banaras	07:30 AM	Wednesday	Veraval Junction	18:45 PM	Thursday

== Rake sharing ==
The train shares its rake with 19203/19204 Bandra Terminus–Veraval Weekly Superfast Express.

== See also ==
- Veraval Junction
- Banaras
- Superfast trains in India
