= Manduadih–New Delhi Superfast Express =

Banaras-New Delhi Superfast Express train

Banaras - New Delhi Superfast Express
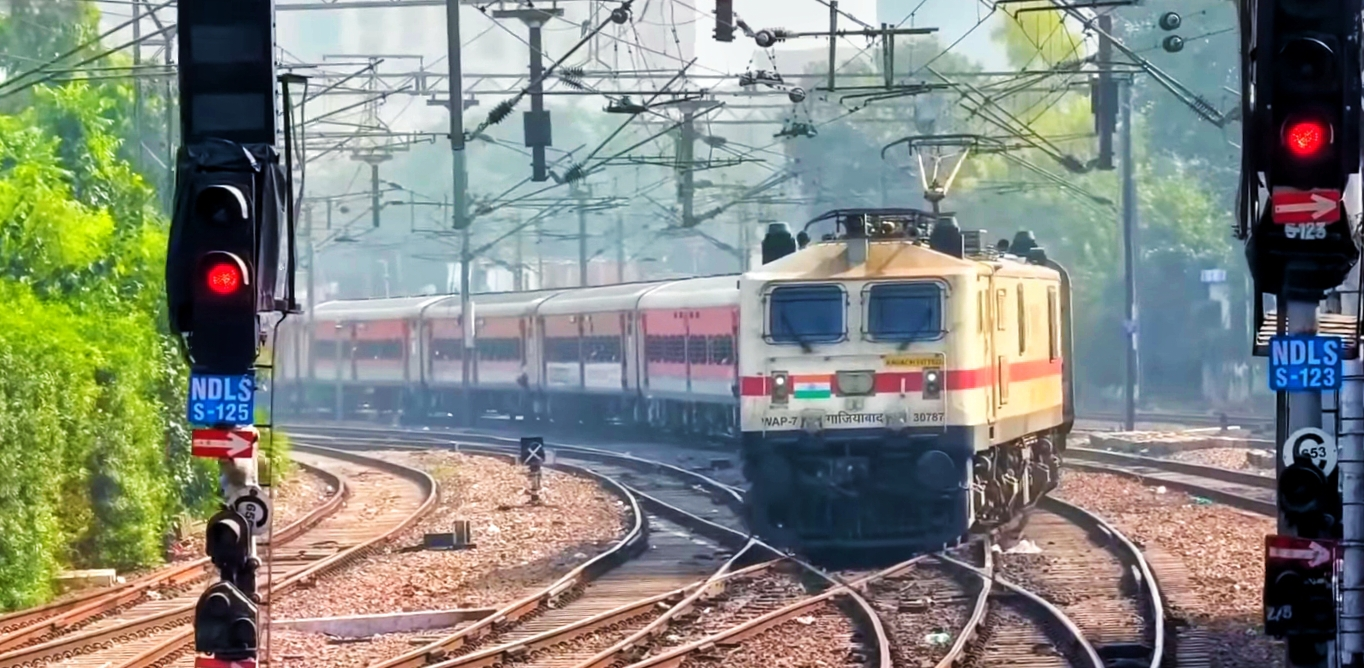
- Banaras - New Delhi Superfast Express Arriving At New Delhi

Overview
- Service type: Superfast Express
- Locale: Delhi & Uttar Pradesh
- First service: 1 March 2015; 11 years ago
- Current operator: North Eastern Railways

Route
- Termini: Banaras (BNRS); New Delhi (NDLS)
- Stops: 5
- Distance travelled: 755 km (469 mi)
- Average journey time: 10 hours 52 minutes
- Service frequency: Daily
- Train number: 12581 / 12582

On-board services
- Classes: AC-I Tier, AC-II Tier, AC-III Tier, Sleeper Class, General Unreserved
- Seating arrangements: Yes
- Sleeping arrangements: Yes
- Catering facilities: E-catering
- Observation facilities: Large windows
- Baggage facilities: Yes

Technical
- Rolling stock: LHB coach
- Track gauge: 1,676 mm (5 ft 6 in)
- Operating speed: 130 km/h (Avg. Speed = 66 km/h)

The Banaras- New Delhi Superfast Express is a Superfast Express train belonging to North Eastern Railway zone that runs between Banaras and New Delhi in India. It is currently being operated with 12581/12582 train numbers on a daily basis.

== Service ==
The 12581/Banaras - New Delhi SF Express has an average speed of 71 kilometres per hour (44 mph) and covers 755 kilometres (469 mi) in 10 hours and 35 minutes. The 12582/New Delhi - Banaras SF Express has an average speed of 68 kilometres per hour (42 mph) and covers 755 kilometres (469 mi) in 11 hours and 10 minutes.

== Route and halts ==
The important halts of the train are:

- Banaras
- Gyanpur Road
- Prayagraj Junction
- Kanpur Central
- Tundla Junction
- Ghaziabad Junction
- New Delhi

== Traction ==
Both trains are hauled by a Ghaziabad Loco Shed based WAP 7 or WAP 5 electric locomotive from Banaras to New Delhi.

== Time table ==
'From Banaras to New Delhi it starts with Number 12581 and time table is as:

S.No.	Station	Arrival	Departure	Halt (Min.)	Day	Elevation
1	Banaras	Starting Station	23:10	-	1	80m
2	Gyanpur Road	23:53	23:55	2	1	80m
3	Prayagraj	01:20	01:25	5	2	100m
4	Kanpur Central	03:45	03:50	5	2	129m
5	Tundla Junction	06:28	06:30	2	2	129m
6	Ghaziabad	08:53	08:55	2	2	216m
7	New Delhi	09:45	Destination	-	2	216m

'From New Delhi to Banaras it starts with Number 12582 and time table is as:

S.No.	Station	Arrival	Departure	Halt (Min.)	Day	Elevation
1	New Delhi	Starting Station	22:50	-	1	216m
2	Ghaziabad	23:20	23:22	1	2	216m
3	Tundla Junction	01:23	01:25	2	2	129m
4	Kanpur Central	04:25	04:30	5	2	129m
5	Prayagraj	07:30	07:40	10	2	100m
6	Gyanpur Road	08:41	08:43	2	2	80m
7	Banaras	10:00	Destination	-	2	80m

== Coach composition ==
This train has 23 coaches between Banaras Station to New Delhi station.

- 1 AC 1 Tier Coach (H1)
- 2 AC 2 Tier Coach (A1-A2)
- 8 AC 3 Tier Coach (B1-B6 & BE1-BE2)
- 5 Sleeper class Coach (S1-S5)
- 4 General compartments (unreserved)
- 1 SLR
- 1 EOG
- 1 HCP

Coach composition for 12581 BSBS-NDLS Superfast Express:

Loco	1	2	3	4	5	6	7	8	9	10	11	12	13	14	15	16	17	18	19	20	21	22	23
	HCP	EOG	H1	A1	A2	B1	B2	B3	B4	B5	B6	BE1	BE2	S1	S2	S3	S4	S5	GEN	GEN	GEN	GEN	SLR

Coach composition for 12582 NDLS-BSBS Superfast Express:

Loco	1	2	3	4	5	6	7	8	9	10	11	12	13	14	15	16	17	18	19	20	21	22	23
	SLR	GEN	GEN	GEN	GEN	S5	S4	S3	S2	S1	BE2	BE1	B6	B5	B4	B3	B2	B1	A2	A1	H1	EOG	HCP

== See also ==
- New Delhi railway station
- Banaras railway station
- Shiv Ganga Express
