= Agra Cantonment–Banaras Vande Bharat Express =

Mini Vande Bharat Express train route in India

Agra Cantonment – Banaras Vande Bharat Express
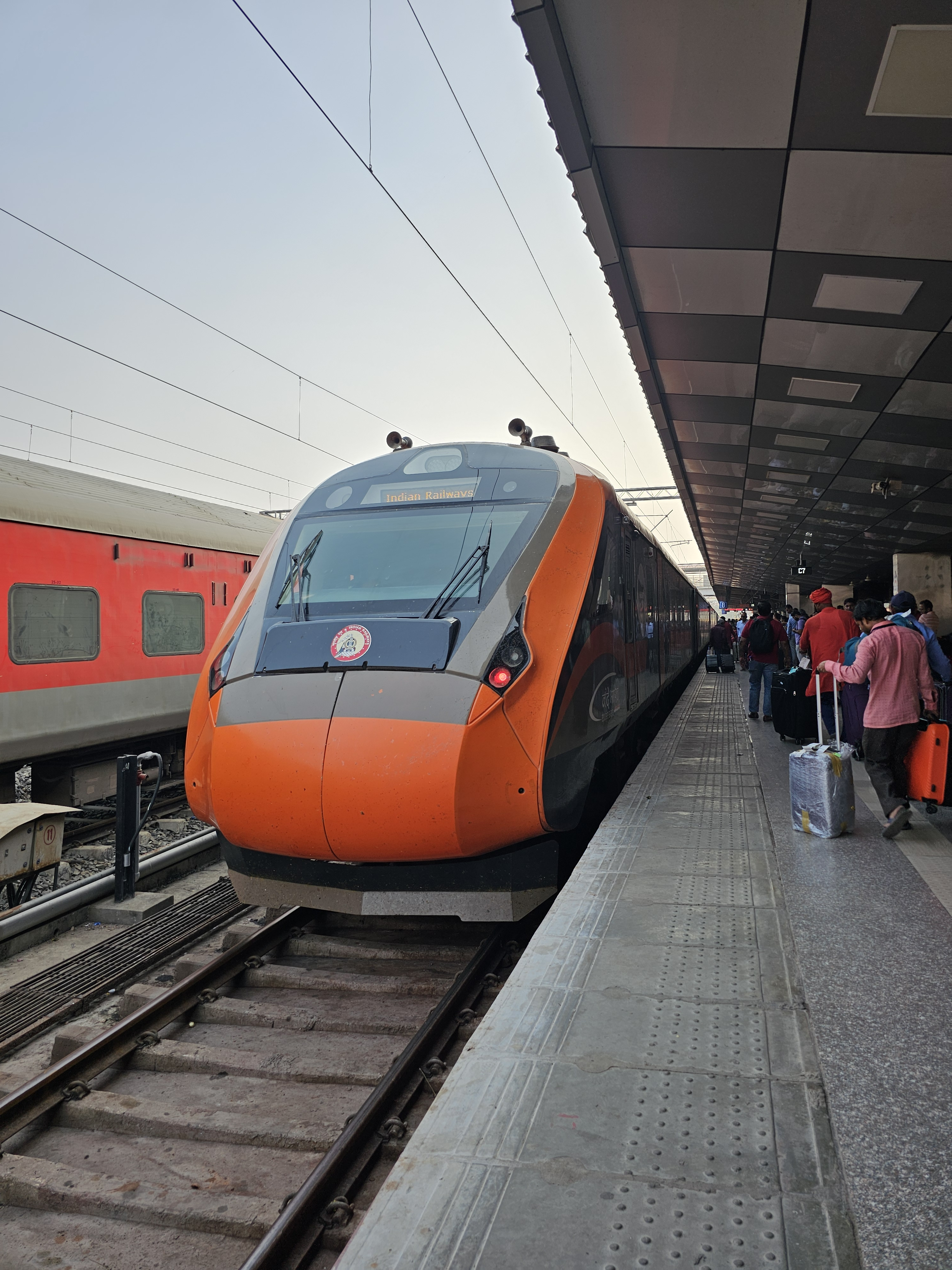
- Mini Vande Bharat Express on standby at Banaras railway station

Overview
- Service type: Vande Bharat Express
- Locale: Uttar Pradesh
- First service: September 16, 2024 (Inaugural); 23 September 2024; 2 years ago (Commercial)
- Current operator: North Central Railways (NCR)

Route
- Termini: Agra Cantonment (AGC); Banaras (BSBS)
- Stops: 04
- Distance travelled: 573 km (356 mi)
- Average journey time: 07 hrs
- Service frequency: Six days a week (Note: Except Wednesdays)
- Train number: 20176 / 20175
- Lines used: Agra Cantonment–Tundla Jn line; New Delhi–Kanpur section (till Kanpur Central); Kanpur–DDU section (till Prayagraj Jn); Prayagraj Jn–Banaras

On-board services
- Classes: AC Chair Car, AC Executive Chair Car
- Seating arrangements: Airline style; Rotatable seats
- Sleeping arrangements: No
- Catering facilities: On-board catering
- Observation facilities: Large windows in all coaches
- Entertainment facilities: On-board WiFi; Infotainment system; Electric outlets; Reading light; Seat pockets; Bottle holder; Tray table
- Baggage facilities: Overhead racks
- Other facilities: Kavach

Technical
- Rolling stock: Mini Vande Bharat 2.0 (Last service: May 28, 2025); Vande Bharat 2.0 (First service: May 29, 2025)
- Track gauge: Indian gauge
- Electrification: 25 kV 50 Hz AC overhead line
- Operating speed: 82 km/h (51 mph) (Avg.)
- Average length: 384 metres (1,260 ft) (16 coaches)
- Track owner: Indian Railways
- Rake maintenance: (TBC)

The 20176/20175 Agra Cantonment – Banaras Vande Bharat Express is India's 64th Vande Bharat Express train, connecting the riverside city of Agra, located on the banks of the Yamuna River, with the Ganges city of Varanasi in Uttar Pradesh.

This express train was inaugurated on September 16, 2024, by Prime Minister Narendra Modi via video conferencing from Ahmedabad, Gujarat.

== Overview ==
This train is currently operated by Indian Railways, connecting Agra Cantt., Tundla Junction, Etawah Junction, Kanpur Central, Prayagraj Junction, and Banaras. It operates with train numbers 20176/20175, running six days a week.

== Rakes ==
It was the 60th 2nd generation and 43rd Mini Vande Bharat 2.0 Express train, designed and manufactured by the Integral Coach Factory at Perambur, Chennai under the Make in India initiative.

=== Coach augmentation ===
As of 2025, this express train was augmented with 8 additional AC coaches and has been running with Vande Bharat 2.0 trainset W.E.F. 29 May 2025, in order to enhance passenger capacity on this popular route.

== Service ==
The 20176/20175 Agra Cantonment – Banaras Vande Bharat Express currently operates 6 days a week, covering a distance of 573 km (356 mi) in a travel time of 7 hrs with average speed of 82 km/h. The Maximum Permissible Speed (MPS) is 130 km/h (81 mph).

== See also ==
- Vande Bharat Express
- Tejas Express
- Gatiman Express
- Agra Cantonment railway station
- Banaras railway station
