= Ranchi–Godda Intercity Express =

Train in India

Overview
- Service type: Express
- First service: 25 December 2012; 13 years ago
- Current operator: South Eastern Railway zone

Route
- Termini: Ranchi Junction; Godda
- Stops: 20
- Distance travelled: 455 km (283 mi)
- Average journey time: 9 hours 47 mins
- Service frequency: Daily
- Train number: 18619 / 18620

On-board services
- Classes: 1 AC, AC 2 Tier, AC 3 Tier, Sleeper class, General unreserved
- Seating arrangements: Yes
- Sleeping arrangements: Yes
- Catering facilities: No

Technical
- Rolling stock: Standard Indian Railways Coaches
- Track gauge: 1,676 mm (5 ft 6 in)
- Operating speed: 42 km/h (26 mph)

The 18619 / 20 Ranchi–Godda Intercity Express is a Express train belonging to Indian Railways South Eastern Railway zone that runs between Ranchi and Godda in India.

It operates as train number 18619 from Ranchi to Godda and as train number 18620 in the reverse direction serving the states of Jharkhand & West Bengal.

== Coaches ==
The 18619 / 20 Ranchi–Godda Intercity Express has one AC 3 Tier, four Sleeper Class, three general unreserved & two SLR (seating with luggage rake) coaches. It does not carry a pantry car.

As is customary with most train services in India, coach composition may be amended at the discretion of Indian Railways depending on demand.

The train has been allotted a 10-coach rake of ICF coach.

Loco	1	2	3	4	5	6	7	8	9	10
	SLR	GS	GS	B1	S1	S2	S3	S4	GS	SLR

== Service ==
The 18619 Ranchi–Godda Intercity Express covers the distance of 410 km (255 mi) in 9 hours 50 mins (42 km/h) and in 9 hours 45 mins as the 18620 Godda–Ranchi Junction Intercity Express (42 km/h).

As the average speed of the train is slightly more than 55 km/h (34 mph), as per railway rules, its fare doesn't includes a Superfast surcharge.

== Schedule ==
Running days : Daily from both the sides.

Train number	Station code	Departure station	Departure time (IST)	Arrival station	Arrival time
18619	RNC	Ranchi	9:25 PM	Godda	Next day 9:35 AM
18620	GODA	Godda	4:30 PM	Ranchi	Next day 4:35 AM

== Routing ==
The 18619 / 20 Ranchi–Godda Intercity Express runs from Ranchi via Bokaro Steel City, Dhanbad, Jasidih, Dumka to Godda.

== Traction ==
As the route is not fully electrified, a Satragachi-based WDM-3A diesel locomotive pulls the train to Jasidih and from there it runs with a Howrah-based WAP- 4 electric locomotive pulls to its entire destination.

== See also ==
- Godda
- Indian Railways
- Dumka
- Jasidih Junction
- Jasidih–Dumka–Rampurhat line
- Ranchi Junction
- List of railway stations in India
- South Eastern Railway zone
