= Antu =

Antu may refer to:

== Mythology ==
- Antu (goddess), a goddess, in Akkadian mythology
- Antu (Mapuche mythology), the Pillan spirit in the Mapuche mythology

== Astronomy ==
- Antum (crater), a crater on Ganymede, the largest moon of Jupiter

== Locations ==
- Antu, India, a town in Pratapgarh District, Uttar Pradesh, India
- Antu County, in Jilin, China
- Äntu, village in Väike-Maarja Parish, Lääne-Viru County, Estonia

== Chemistry ==
- α-Naphthylthiourea, a thiourea derivative used as a rodenticide
