= Banaras railway station =

Railway station in Uttar Pradesh, India

BANARAS Manduadih

General information
- Location: Varanasi, Uttar Pradesh; India
- Coordinates: 25°17′5″N 82°58′20″E
- Elevation: 80.71 m (264.8 ft)
- System: Indian Railways station
- Owner: Indian Railways
- Operator: North Eastern Railways
- Line: Pandit Deen Dayal Upadhyaya Junction – Kanpur section. Prayagraj-Mau-Gorakhpur main line
- Platforms: 8
- Tracks: 11

Construction
- Structure type: At grade
- Parking: Yes
- Accessible: Available

Other information
- Status: Functioning
- Station code: BNRS
- Zone(s): North Eastern Railway
- Division(s): Varanasi

History
- Former names: Manduadih railway station

Services
Location
- Location within Varanasi district Location within Uttar Pradesh Location within India
- Interactive map

Banaras railway station (station code: BNRS), formerly known as Manduadih railway station, is situated in Varanasi in the Indian state of Uttar Pradesh. It is a major station of Varanasi. The new sign boards have the name of the station in Hindi, English, Urdu and Sanskrit. Due to heavy rush at Varanasi Junction, it has been developed as a high facilitated station

== History ==
The Prayagraj–Mau–Gorakhpur main line was constructed as a 1,000 mm (3 ft 3 3/8 in)-wide metre-gauge line by the Bengal and North Western Railway between 1899 and 1913. It was opened as MG (metre-gauge) railway station in 1906. It is now, NSG-3 Class and Adarsh station. It was converted to 5 ft 6 in (1,676 mm) broad gauge in 1993–94.

== Express trains originating from Banaras ==
Train number	Train name	Origin	Destination
12559	Shiv Ganga Express	Banaras	New Delhi
12581	Banaras–New Delhi Superfast Express	Banaras	New Delhi
15103	Gorakhpur–Banaras Intercity Express	Banaras	Gorakhpur Junction
22132	Pune–Banaras Gyan Ganga Express	Banaras	Pune Junction
12946	Banaras Veraval Weekly SF Express	Banaras	Veraval Jn
22535	Rameswaram–Banaras Weekly Express	Banaras	Rameswaram railway station
12168	Banaras–Lokmanya Tilak Terminus SF Express	Banaras	Lokmanya Tilak Terminus
15125	Kashi Patna Jan Shatabdi Express	Banaras	Patna Junction
18524	Banaras Vishakapatnam Express	Banaras	Vishakapatnam
18612	Banaras–Ranchi Express	Banaras	Ranchi Junction
14257	Kashi Vishwanath Express	Banaras	New Delhi
11108	Bundelkhand Express	Banaras	Gwalior Junction
12946	Banaras-Veraval Weekly SF Express	Banaras	Veraval Junction
16368	Kashi Tamil Sangam Express	Banaras	Kanyakumari
17324	Banaras–Hubballi Express	Banaras	Hubballi
14219	Banaras Agra Cantt Vande Bharat Express	Banaras	Agra Cantonment
22541	Banaras-Anand Vihar Terminal Garib Rath Express	Banaras	Anand Vihar

== Passenger trains originating from Banaras ==
Train number	Train name	Origin	Destination
55122	Passenger	Banaras	Bhatni
55150	Passenger	Banaras	Gorakhpur
55125	Passenger	Banaras	Prayagraj Rambag
55127	Passenger	Banaras	Prayagraj Rambag
55129	Passenger	Banaras	Prayagraj Rambag
63230	Passenger (MEMU)	Banaras	Buxar
75107	Passenger (DEMU)	Banaras	Prayagraj Rambag

== See also ==
- Varanasi Junction railway station
- Varanasi City railway station
- Pt. Deen Dayal Upadhyaya Junction railway station
- Kashi railway station
- Kerakat railway station

Preceding station	Indian Railways	Following station
Varanasi Junction towards ?	North Eastern Railway zone Varanasi–Allahabad link	Bhulanpur towards ?
