= Gorakhpur–Manduadih Intercity Express =

Gorakhpur–Banaras Intercity Express
Overview
- Service type: Intercity
- Current operator: Northern Eastern Railway

Route
- Termini: Gorakhpur Junction (GKP); Banaras (BSBS)
- Stops: 14
- Distance travelled: 234 km (145 mi)
- Average journey time: 5h 45m
- Service frequency: Daily (Note: Runs seven days in a week for every direction.)
- Train number: 15103/15104

On-board services
- Classes: CC, UR/GEN
- Seating arrangements: Yes
- Sleeping arrangements: No
- Catering facilities: On-board catering E-catering
- Entertainment facilities: No
- Baggage facilities: No
- Other facilities: Below the seats

Technical
- Rolling stock: LHB coach
- Track gauge: 1,676 mm (5 ft 6 in)
- Operating speed: 110 km/h (68 mph), including halts

The Gorakhpur–Banaras Intercity Express is an Intercity train belonging to North Eastern Railway zone that runs between Gorakhpur Cantonment and Banaras railway station in India. It is currently being operated with 15103/15104 train numbers on a daily basis.

== Service ==
The 15103/Gorakhpur–Banaras Intercity Express has an average speed of 41 kilometres per hour (25 mph) and covers 234 kilometres (145 mi) in 5 hours and 45 minutes. The 15104/Banaras–Gorakhpur InterCity Express has an average speed of 41 kilometres per hour (25 mph) and covers 234 kilometres (145 mi) in 5 hours and 45 minutes.

== Route and halts ==
The important halts of the train are:

- Gorakhpur Junction
- Deoria Sadar
- Bhatni Junction
- Salempur Junction
- Lar Road
- Belthara Road
- Indara Junction
- Mau Junction
- Dullahapur
- Jakhanian
- Sadat
- Aunrihar Junction
- Varanasi City
- Varanasi Junction
- Banaras

== Coach composition ==
The train has standard LHB rakes with a max speed of 110 kilometres per hour (68 mph). The train consists of 18 coaches:

- 2 × air-conditioned Chair Car
- 6 × non-air-conditioned Chair Car
- 8 × general unreserved coach
- 2 × EOGs

== Traction ==
Both trains are hauled by WAP-7 electric locomotive from Varanasi to Gorakhpur and vice versa.

== See also ==
- Gorakhpur Junction railway station
- Banaras railway station
