= Kamakhya–Anand Vihar Weekly Express =

Train in India

Overview
- Service type: Express
- First service: 18 June 2013; 12 years ago
- Current operator: Northeast Frontier Railway

Route
- Termini: Kamakhya Junction (KYQ); Anand Vihar Terminal (ANVT)
- Stops: 23
- Distance travelled: 1,879 km (1,168 mi)
- Average journey time: 36h 40m
- Service frequency: Once a week
- Train number: 15621/15622

On-board services
- Classes: AC 2 Tier, AC 3 Tier, Sleeper 3 Tier, Unreserved
- Seating arrangements: No
- Sleeping arrangements: Yes
- Catering facilities: Yes
- Observation facilities: LHB coach
- Entertainment facilities: No

Technical
- Rolling stock: 2
- Track gauge: 1,676 mm (5 ft 6 in)
- Operating speed: 51 km/h (32 mph)

Kamakhya–Anand Vihar Weekly Express is an Express train of the Indian Railways connecting Anand Vihar Terminal in Delhi and Kamakhya Junction in Guwahati, Assam. It is currently being operated with 15621/15622 train numbers on once in week basis.

== Service ==
The 15621/Kamakhya–Anand Vihar Weekly Express has an average speed of 53 km/h and covers 1878 km in 36 hrs 5 mins. 15622/Anand Vihar–Kamakhya Weekly Express has an average speed of 48 km/h and covers 1878 km in 39 hrs 40 mins.

== Route and halts ==
The important halts of the train are:

- Assam:
1. Kamakhya Junction (Starts)
2. Goalpara Town
3. New Bongaigaon Junction
4. Kokrajhar
- West Bengal:
1. Alipurduar Junction
2. Binnaguri Junction
3. New Mal Junction
4. New Jalpaiguri (Siliguri)
- Bihar:
1. Katihar Junction
2. Barauni Junction
3. Chhapra Junction
4. Siwan Junction
- Uttar Pradesh :
1. Gorakhpur Junction
2. Basti
3. Gonda Junction
4. Sitapur Cantonment
5. Chandausi Junction
6. Moradabad Junction
7. Hapur Junction
8. Ghaziabad Junction
- Delhi:
1. Anand Vihar Terminal (Ends)

== Schedule ==
Train number	Station code	Departure station	Departure time	Departure day	Arrival station	Arrival time	Arrival day
15621	KYQ	Kamakhya Junction	5:35 AM	Thursday	Anand Vihar Terminal	6:15 PM	Friday
15622	ANVT	Anand Vihar Terminal	11:45 PM	Friday	Kamakhya Junction	3:25 PM	Sunday

== Rake sharing ==
15619/15620 – Kamakhya–Gaya Weekly Express

== Traction ==
Kamakhya Anand Vihar Terminal Weekly Express is hauled by a Diesel Loco Shed, Siliguri-based WDP-4B/ WDP-4D/WDP-4 Locomotive from Kamakhya up to New Jalpaiguri. And from New Jalpaiguri to Anand Vihar Terminal, the train is hauled by WAP-5/ WAP-7 Locomotive of Electric Loco Shed, Ghaziabad and vice versa.

== Rake maintenance ==
The train is maintained by the Guwahati Coaching Depot. The same rake is used for Kamakhya–Gaya Weekly Express for one way which is altered by the second rake on the other way.

== Coach composition ==
The train consists of 24 LHB coach:

- 1 AC III Tier
- 6 Sleeper coaches
- 7 General
- 2 Second-class Luggage/parcel van
