= Kashi Patna Jan Shatabdi Express =

Jan Shatabdi Express train in India

Kashi - Patna Junction Jan Shatabdi Express

Overview
- Service type: Superfast, Jan Shatabdi Express
- First service: 12 March 2018; 8 years ago
- Current operator: North Eastern Railways (NER)

Route
- Termini: Banaras (BSBS); Patna Junction (PNBE)
- Stops: 6
- Distance travelled: 233 km (145 mi)
- Average journey time: 4 hours 40 mins as 15125 Banaras Patna Kashi Patna Jan Shatabdi Express, 5 hours 00 mins as 15126 Patna Banaras Kashi Patna Jan Shatabdi Express.
- Service frequency: Daily service
- Train number: 15125/26

On-board services
- Classes: AC Chair Car, 2nd Class seating, Unreserved/General
- Seating arrangements: Yes
- Sleeping arrangements: No
- Catering facilities: No Pantry car attached
- Observation facilities: Mahamana Express rake
- Baggage facilities: Overhead racks

Technical
- Rolling stock: LHB coach
- Track gauge: 1,676 mm (5 ft 6 in)
- Electrification: Yes
- Operating speed: 130 km/h (80 mph) maximum 48.26 km/h (29.99 mph) including halts

The 15125/26 Kashi Patna Jan Shatabdi Express is a Superfast express train of the Jan Shatabdi Express series belonging to Indian Railways - North Eastern Railway zone that runs between Banaras and Patna Junction in India.

It operates as train number 15125 from Banaras to Patna Junction and as train number 15126 in the reverse direction serving the states of Uttar Pradesh and Bihar.

It is among the latest trains introduced in the Jan Shatabdi Express series which were originally started by the then railway minister of India Mr. Nitish Kumar during the 2002–03 railway budget

== Coaches ==
The 15125/26 Banaras Patna Kashi Patna Jan Shatabdi Express has one AC Chair Car, 11 2nd Class seating, two Unreserved/General and two Seating cum Luggage Rake Coaches. It does not carry a Pantry car coach

As is customary with most train services in India, Coach Composition may be amended at the discretion of Indian Railways depending on demand.

== Service ==
The 15125 Banaras Patna Kashi Patna Jan Shatabdi Express covers the distance of 233 km (145 mi) in 4 hours 40 mins averaging 49.93 km/h (31.03 mph) and in 5 hours 00 mins as 15126 Patna Banaras Kashi Patna Jan Shatabdi Express averaging 46.60 km/h (28.96 mph) .

Despite the average speed of the train being below 55 km/h (35 mph), as per Indian Railways rules, its fare includes a Superfast surcharge.

== Routeing ==
The 15125/26 Banaras Patna Kashi Patna Jan Shatabdi Express runs from Banaras via Varanasi Junction, Pandit Deen Dayal Upadhyaya Junction, Buxar, Ara Junction, Bihta Junction to Patna Junction .

== Traction ==
earlier was WDP-4B or WDM-3D. It is hauled by a Pandit Deen Dayal Upadhyaya (Mughalsarai) based WAP 4.

== Operation ==
The 15125/26 Banaras Patna Kashi Patna Jan Shatabdi Express runs on a daily basis in both directions.
