= Godda–New Delhi Humsafar Express =

Train in India

Godda-New Delhi Humsafar Express

Overview
- Service type: Humsafar Express
- First service: 8 April 2021; 5 years ago
- Current operator: East Central Railway

Route
- Termini: Godda (GODA); New Delhi (NDLS)
- Stops: 15
- Distance travelled: 1,323 km (822 mi)
- Average journey time: 22 hrs 45 mins
- Service frequency: Weekly (Note: Runs once in a week for every direction.)
- Train number: 12349 / 12350

On-board services
- Class: AC 3 tier
- Seating arrangements: Yes
- Sleeping arrangements: Yes
- Catering facilities: Available
- Observation facilities: Large windows
- Baggage facilities: No
- Other facilities: Below the seats

Technical
- Rolling stock: LHB Humsafar
- Track gauge: 1,676 mm (5 ft 6 in)
- Operating speed: 58 km/h (36 mph) average including halts.

The 12349 / 12350 Godda–New Delhi Humsafar Express is a superfast train belonging to East Central Railway zone that runs between Godda and New Delhi Railway Station. It is currently being operated with 12349/12350 train numbers on weekly basis.

== Coach composition ==
The trains are completely 3-tier AC sleeper trains designed by Indian Railways with features of LED screen display to show information about stations, train speed etc. and will have announcement system as well, Vending machines for tea, coffee and milk, Bio toilets in compartments as well as CCTV cameras.

== Service ==
The 12349/Godda - New Delhi Weekly Humsafar Express has an average speed of 58 km/h, and covers 1323 km in 22 hrs. 45 minutes

The 12350/New Delhi - Godda Weekly Humsafar Express has an average speed of 58 km/h, and covers 1323 km in 22 hrs 45 minutes.

== Route and halts ==
The important halts of the train are :

- Godda
- Hansdiha
- Mandar Hill
- Bhagalpur
- Sultanganj
- Jamalpur Junction
- Abhaipur
- Kiul Junction
- Nawadah
- Gaya Junction
- Sasaram
- Pandit Deen Dayal Upadhyaya Junction
- Prayagraj Junction
- Kanpur Central
- New Delhi

== Schedule ==
Train Number	Station Code	Departure Station	Departure Time	Departure Day	Arrival Station	Arrival Time	Arrival Day
12349	GODA	Godda	02:00 PM	Mon	New Delhi	12:45 PM	Tue
12350	NDLS	New Delhi	23:45 PM	Tue	Godda	22:30 PM	Wed

== Traction ==
earlier was WDM-3D. Both trains are hauled by a Kanpur Loco Shed or Ghaziabad Loco Shed-based WAP-7 electric locomotive from Godda to New Delhi and vice versa.

== See also ==
- Humsafar Express
- Godda
- New Delhi Railway Station
