= Gyanpur Road railway station =

Railway station in Uttar Pradesh

General information
- Location: Gyanpur, Bhadohi District; India
- Coordinates: 25°16′48″N 82°25′40″E
- Elevation: 92 metres (302 ft)
- System: Indian Railways station
- Owner: Indian Railways
- Line: Allahabad–Mau–Gorakhpur line
- Platforms: 2
- Tracks: 2

Construction
- Structure type: Standard (on-ground station)
- Parking: No
- Cycle facilities: No

Other information
- Status: Functioning
- Station code: GYN
- Zone(s): North Eastern Railway
- Division(s): Varanasi
- Fare zone: North Eastern Railway
Location
- Location within India Location within Uttar Pradesh

Gyanpur Road railway station is a small railway station in Gyanpur town of Bhadohi district in Uttar Pradesh. Its code is GYN. It serves Gyanpur town. The station consists of two platforms. The platforms are not well sheltered. It lacks many facilities including water and sanitation.

== Trains ==
- Lokmanya Tilak Terminus–Darbhanga Pawan Express
- Swatantra Senani Superfast Express
- Bhrigu Superfast Express
- Kamakhya–Rohtak Amrit Bharat Express
- Ernakulam–Patna Express (via Tirupati)
- Deekshabhoomi Express
- Rameswaram–Manduadih Express
- Lichchavi Express
- Raxaul–Lokmanya Tilak Terminus Antyodaya Express
- Pune–Manduadih Gyan Ganga Express
- Shiv Ganga Express
- Pune–Darbhanga Gyan Ganga Express
- Chauri Chaura Express
- Udhna–Danapur Express
- Manduadih–New Delhi Superfast Express
- Manduadih–Jabalpur Express
- Vibhuti Express
- Secunderabad–Danapur Express
