= Kamakhya–Gaya Weekly Express =

Train in India

Gaya–Kamakhya Weekly Express
Overview
- Service type: Express
- Locale: Assam, West Bengal and Bihar
- First service: 27 February 2009; 17 years ago
- Current operator: North East Frontier Railway

Route
- Termini: Gaya Junction (GAYA); Kamakhya Junction (KYQ)
- Stops: 19
- Distance travelled: 1,070 km (660 mi)
- Average journey time: 22 hours 45 mins
- Service frequency: once a Week
- Train number: 15619/15620

On-board services
- Classes: AC 2 Tier, AC 3 Tier, Sleeper 3 Tier, Unreserved
- Seating arrangements: No
- Sleeping arrangements: Yes
- Catering facilities: Yes
- Entertainment facilities: No
- Baggage facilities: Available

Technical
- Rolling stock: LHB coach
- Track gauge: 1,676 mm (5 ft 6 in)
- Operating speed: 47 km/h (29 mph)

Gaya–Kamakhya Weekly Express is an Express train of the Indian Railways connecting Gaya Junction in Bihar and Kamakhya Junction in Assam. It is currently being operated with 15619/15620 train numbers on once in week basis.

== Service ==
The 15619/Gaya–Kamakhya Weekly Express has an average speed of 46 km/h and covers 1071 km in 23 hrs 20 mins. 15620/Kamakhya–Gaya Weekly Express has an average speed of 47 km/h and covers 1071 km in 22 hrs 40 mins.

== Route and halts ==
The important halts of the train are :

BIHAR

1. Gaya Junction
2. Nawada
3. Warisaliganj
4. Sheikhpura
5. Kiul Junction
6. Jamalpur Junction
7. Bhagalpur Junction
8. Kishanganj
9. Barsoi

JHARKHAND

1. Sahibganj Junction
2. Barharwa Junction

WEST BENGAL

1. New Farakka Junction
2. Malda Town
3. New Jalpaiguri (Siliguri)
4. New Cooch Behar
5. New Alipurduar

ASSAM

1. Kokrajhar
2. New Bongaigaon Junction
3. Goalpara Town
4. Kamakhya Junction

== Schedule ==
Train number	Station code	Departure station	Departure time	Departure day	Arrival station	Arrival time	Arrival day
15619	GAYA	Gaya Junction	12:55 PM (Afternoon)	Tuesday	Kamakhya Junction	12:30 PM (Afternoon)	Wednesday
15620	KYQ	Kamakhya Junction	7:00 AM	Monday	Gaya Junction	5:40 AM	Tuesday

== Rake sharing ==
15621/15622 – Kamakhya–Anand Vihar Weekly Express

== Traction ==
Kamakhya - Gaya Express is hauled by a Diesel Loco Shed, Siliguri-based WDM-3A or WDM-3D Locomotive from Kamakhya to New Cooch Behar and then from New Cooch Behar to Gaya it is hauled by WAP-7 locomotive of Electric Loco Shed, Howrah.

== Rake maintenance ==
The train is maintained by the Guwahati Coaching Depot. The same rake is used for Kamakhya–Anand Vihar Weekly Express for one way which is altered by the second rake on the other way.

== Coach composition ==
The train consists of 21 coaches:

- 5 AC III Tier
- 1 AC II Tier
- 10 Sleeper coaches
- 3 General
- 2 EOG
