= Pune–Gorakhpur Express =

Express Train in India

Gorakhpur Pune Express
Overview
- Service type: Mail/Express
- Last service: Operating
- Current operator: Central Railway zone

Route
- Termini: Pune Junction; Gorakhpur Junction
- Stops: 15
- Distance travelled: 1,771 kilometres (1,100 miles)
- Average journey time: 33 hours 50 minutes
- Service frequency: Weekly
- Train number: 11037 / 11038

On-board services
- Classes: AC-II, AC-III, SL, GEN
- Seating arrangements: Yes
- Sleeping arrangements: Yes
- Catering facilities: Available (paid)

Technical
- Track gauge: 1,676 mm (5 ft 6 in)
- Operating speed: Maximum: 110 kilometres per hour (68 mph); Average: 59.1 kilometres per hour (36.7 mph) (including halts); 60 kilometres per hour (37 mph) (excluding halts)
Route map
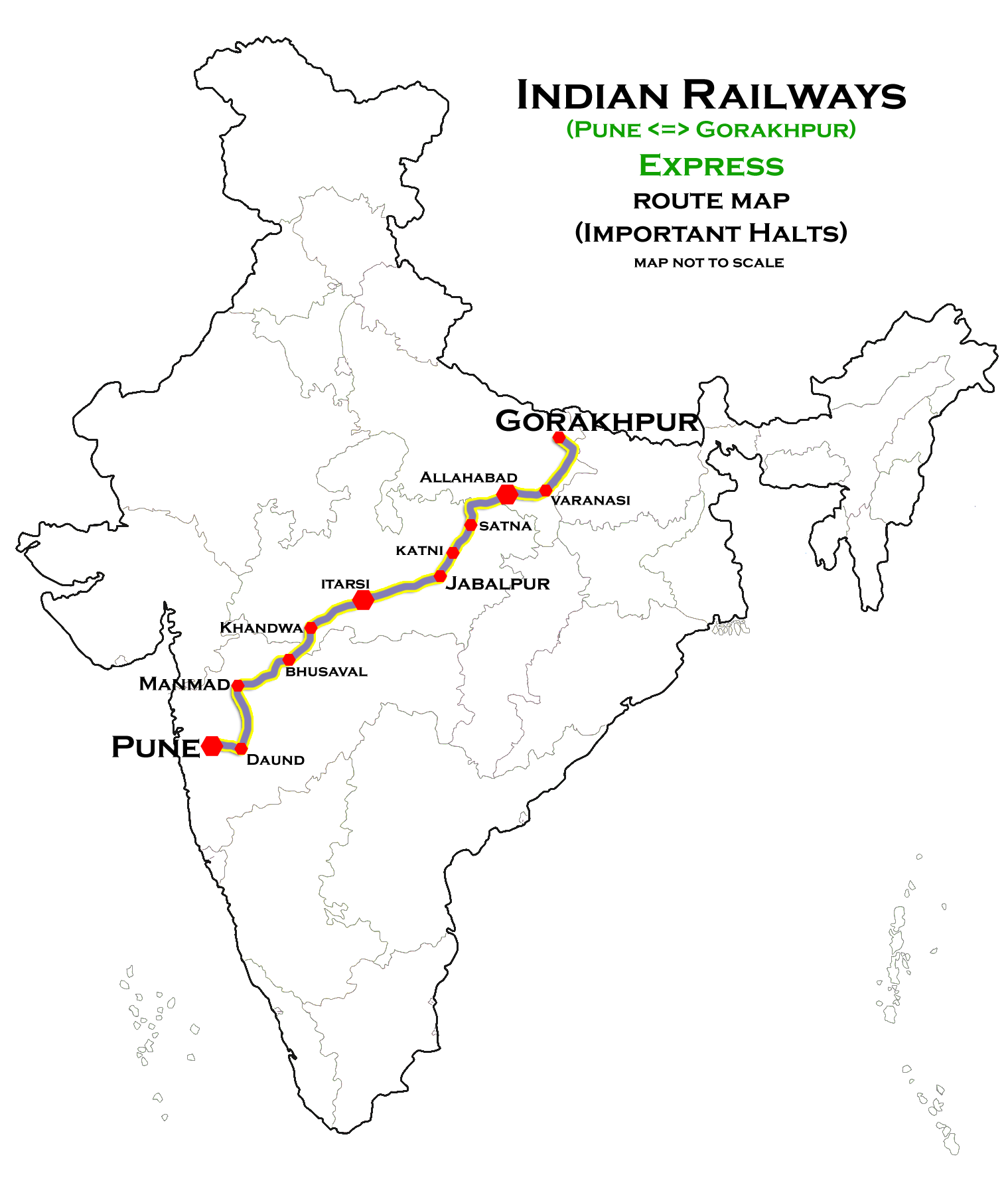

Gorakhpur–Pune Express is a weekly Mail/Express train of the Indian Railways. It runs between Pune Junction of Pune, the important city of Maharashtra and Gorakhpur Junction of Gorakhpur, the prominent city of Uttar Pradesh.

Gorakhpur–Pune Express shares its rake with Gyan Ganga Express. 11037 Gorakhpur–Pune Express leaves Pune Junction on Thursday at 16:15. 11038 Gorakhpur–Pune Express leaves Gorakhpur Junction on Saturday at 15:30. Gorakhpur–Pune Express consists of 23 coaches – one AC-II coach, two AC-III coaches, 13 sleeper class coaches, one pantry coach, four general (unreserved) coaches and two SLR.

In 2019, the train was diverted and ran in a different route off Jabalpur for a short period to facilitate works.

== Coach composition ==
Loco	1	2	3	4	5	6	7	8	9	10	11	12	13	14	15	16	17	18	19	20	21	22	23
	SLR	GEN	GEN	S13	S12	S11	S10	S9	S8	S7	S6	S5	S4	S3	S2	PC	S1	B2	B1	A1	GEN	GEN	SLR

== Route ==
Train is passing through Gorakhpur, Mau, Varanasi, Prayagraj, Manikpur, Satna, Katni, Jabalpur, Itarsi, Khandwa, Bhusawal, Manmad, Daund, and Pune.

== Journey ==
It takes around 36 hours 45 minutes to cover its journey of 1,771 kilometres (1,100 mi) with an average speed of 61 kilometres per hour (38 mph).

== See also ==
- Mau Express
- Kanpur Shatabdi
- Gyan Ganga Express
- Muzaffarpur - Hadapsar (Pune) AC Express
