= Kashi Tamil Sangamam =

Indian government programme

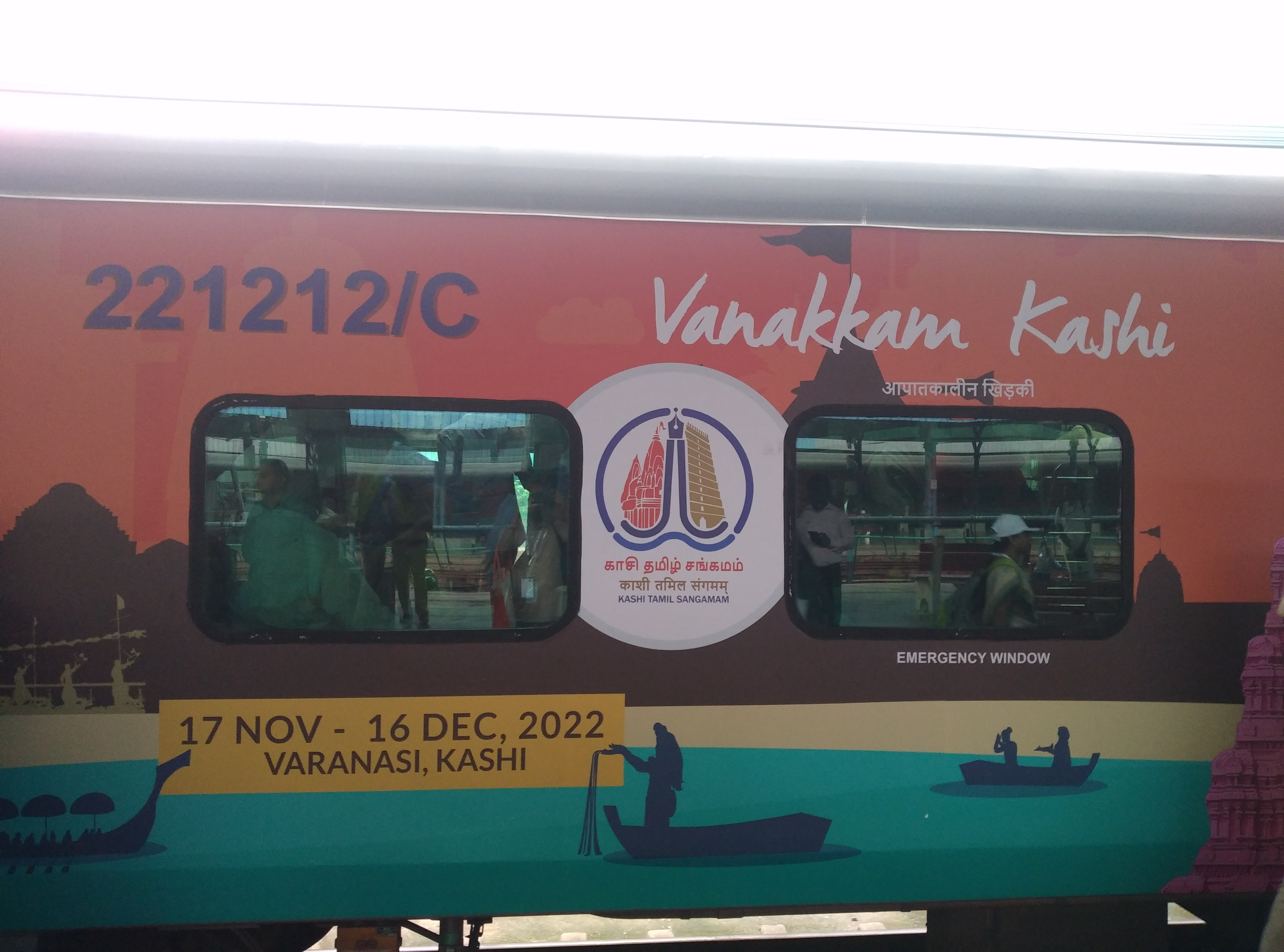
- An advertisement of the event on a train coach
- Date: November 19, 2022
- Duration: 1 Month
- Location: Varanasi, Uttar Pradesh, India
- Type: Government Sponsored Cultural Exchange Event
- Motive: To celebrate and rediscover the age-old cultural links between Tamil Nadu and Kashi
- Budget: ₹15 Crores ($1.8 Million)
- Organised by: Ministry of Education, Government of India
- Participants: 2500
- Outcome: Increased Focus on Tamil Nadu
- Website: kashitamil.iitm.ac.in

Kashi Tamil Sangamam is an annual month-long programme started in 2022 organized by the Ministry of Education, Government of India to celebrate, reaffirm and rediscover the age-old links between Tamil Nadu and Varanasi. It was inaugurated by Prime Minister Narendra Modi on November 19, 2022.

== Background ==
As a part of "Azadi Ka Amrit Mahotsav" to uphold the Spirit of "Ek Bharat Shrestha Bharat", and to expand the relevancy of National Education Policy 2020, a proposal was made before the Ministry of Education, Government of India aiming to rediscover the age-old links of knowledge and civilization between the South Indian state of Tamil Nadu and the Holy City Varanasi (also known as Kashi). The Program was sponsored by IIT Madras in association with Banaras Hindu University. Ministry of Railways had also announced special trains for Sangamam.

== Delegation ==
The Event was attended by Chief Minister of Uttar Pradesh Yogi Adityanath and most of the Cabinet Ministers of Government of India including Home Minister Amit Shah, Defence Minister Rajnath Singh, Education Minister Dharmendra Pradhan, Piyush Goyal, Kiren Rijiju and I&B Minister Anurag Thakur . It was also attended by prominent spiritual leaders including Sadguru, Swami Ramdev and Sri Sri Ravishankar.

== Controversy ==
The Center government wrote to Tamil Nadu Chief Minister MK Stalin a month prior to the event seeking his support and participation in the ongoing Kashi Tamil Sangamam but hasn't received a response. The Central government accused Stalin for not supporting the initiative while the DMK leaders accused that the government didn't invite them.

== Reception ==
The event received some appreciation and compliments from Tamil scholars and some derision but was marked as a success while the political pundits termed it as a masterstroke of Prime Minister Modi for increasing the focus of Tamil People towards him which could politically benefit him in future. Others pointed out it was obviously a shameless political ploy for Tamil votes that most Tamils didn't even know was going on
