= Nawada railway station =

Railway station in Nawada, Bihar, India

Nawadah (Nawada Railway Station)
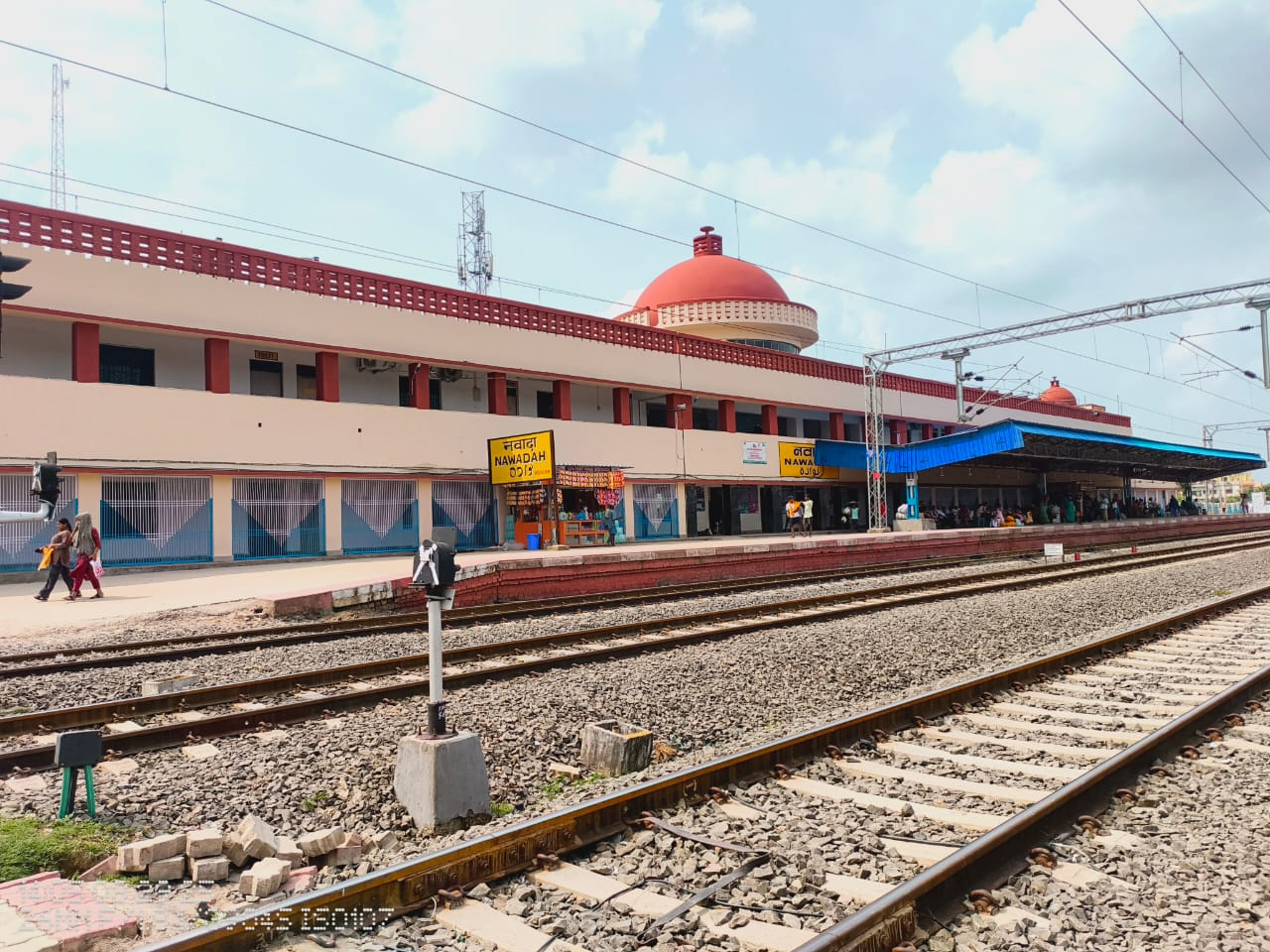

General information
- Location: Platform 1 Side Station Road, Platform 2 side Line Par Mirzapur Nawada, Bihar; India
- Coordinates: 24.8865°N 85.5483°E
- Elevation: 93 metres (305 ft)
- System: Indian Railways Station
- Owner: Indian Railways
- Operator: East Central Railway
- Line: Gaya–Kiul line
- Platforms: 2
- Tracks: 4 (Double Electric)
- Connections: Auto/Toto/Rickshaw/Vehicle

Construction
- Structure type: Standard (on-ground station)
- Parking: Available
- Cycle facilities: No

Other information
- Status: Functioning
- Station code: NWD
- Zone(s): East Central Railway
- Division(s): Danapur

History
- Opened: Opened 1879; 139 years ago
- Rebuilt: Currently New building is in under-construction
- Electrified: Completed from 30 March 2018 25 kV 50 Hz AC OHLE
Location

Nawada Railway Station or Nawadah (station code: NWD), is the main railway station of Nawada in Nawada District, Bihar. It serves Nawada city. The station has two platforms. The platform is well sheltered. Although it is a category C station, it lacks many facilities like most good C class stations. The station lies on Gaya–Kiul line of East Central Railway. Its new building is currently under construction at just 500m away from old building in Kiul direction.

== Major trains ==
The following trains run from Nawada railway station:

TRAIN SCHEDULE
Train No.	Train Name	Arrival Time	Departure Time	Running Days						
03394	Gaya - Kiul Passenger Special (UnReserved)	00:20	00:25	S	M	T	W	T	F	S
15620	Kamakhya - Gaya Weekly Express	03:52	03:54			T				
75272	Nawada - Patna - Nawada DEMU Passenger	-	05:15		M	T	W	T	F	S
03389	Kiul - Gaya Passenger Special (UnReserved)	06:50	06:55	S	M	T	W	T	F	S
03386	Gaya - Jhajha Passenger Special (UnReserved)	06:55	07:00	S	M	T	W	T	F	S
05404	Gaya - Jamalpur Express Special (UnReserved)	07:55	08:00	S	M	T	W	T	F	S
03627	Kiul - Gaya Passenger Special (UnReserved)	07:55	08:00	S	M	T	W	T	F	S
13023	Howrah - Gaya Express	09:00	09:02	S	M	T	W	T	F	S
03356	Gaya - Kiul MEMU Special	08:55	09:00	S	M	T	W	T	F	S
03615	Jamalpur - Gaya Passenger Special (UnReserved)	11:45	11:50	S	M	T	W	T	F	S
03390	Gaya - Kiul Passenger Special (UnReserved)	13:07	13:12	S	M	T	W	T	F	S
19604	Godda-Daurai(Ajmer)Express				T					
19603	Daurai(Ajmer)-Godda Express			M						
13024	Gaya - Howrah Express	13:22	130:24	S	M	T	W	T	F	S
15619	Gaya - Kamakhya Weekly Express	14:01	14:03			T				
12350	New Delhi - Godda Weekly Humsafar Express	15:00	15:02				W			
03616	Gaya - Jamalpur Passenger Special (UnReserved)	17:00	17:05	S	M	T	W	T	F	S
03355	Kiul - Gaya MEMU Special	17:00	17:05	S	M	T	W	T	F	S
03385	Jhajha - Gaya Passenger Special (UnReserved)	18:00	18:05	S	M	T	W	T	F	S
75271	Nawada - Patna - Nawada DEMU Passenger	21:00	-		M	T	W	T	F	S
05407	Rampurhat - Gaya Express Special (UnReserved)	21:30	21:35	S	M	T	W	T	F	S
12349	Godda - New Delhi Weekly Humsafar Express	21:18	21:20		M					
03628	Gaya - Kiul Passenger Special (UnReserved)	21:15	21:20	S	M	T	W	T	F	S
03393	Kiul - Gaya Passenger Special (UnReserved)	22:15	22:20	S	M	T	W	T	F	S

== Proposed Routes Through This Station ==
- Nawada - Banka line (via. Jamui) - 149 Km.
- Nawada - Giridih line (via. Satgawan) - 130 Km.
- Nawada - Pawapuri line - 35 Km.
- Nawada - Lakshmipur line - 137 Km.

== Images ==
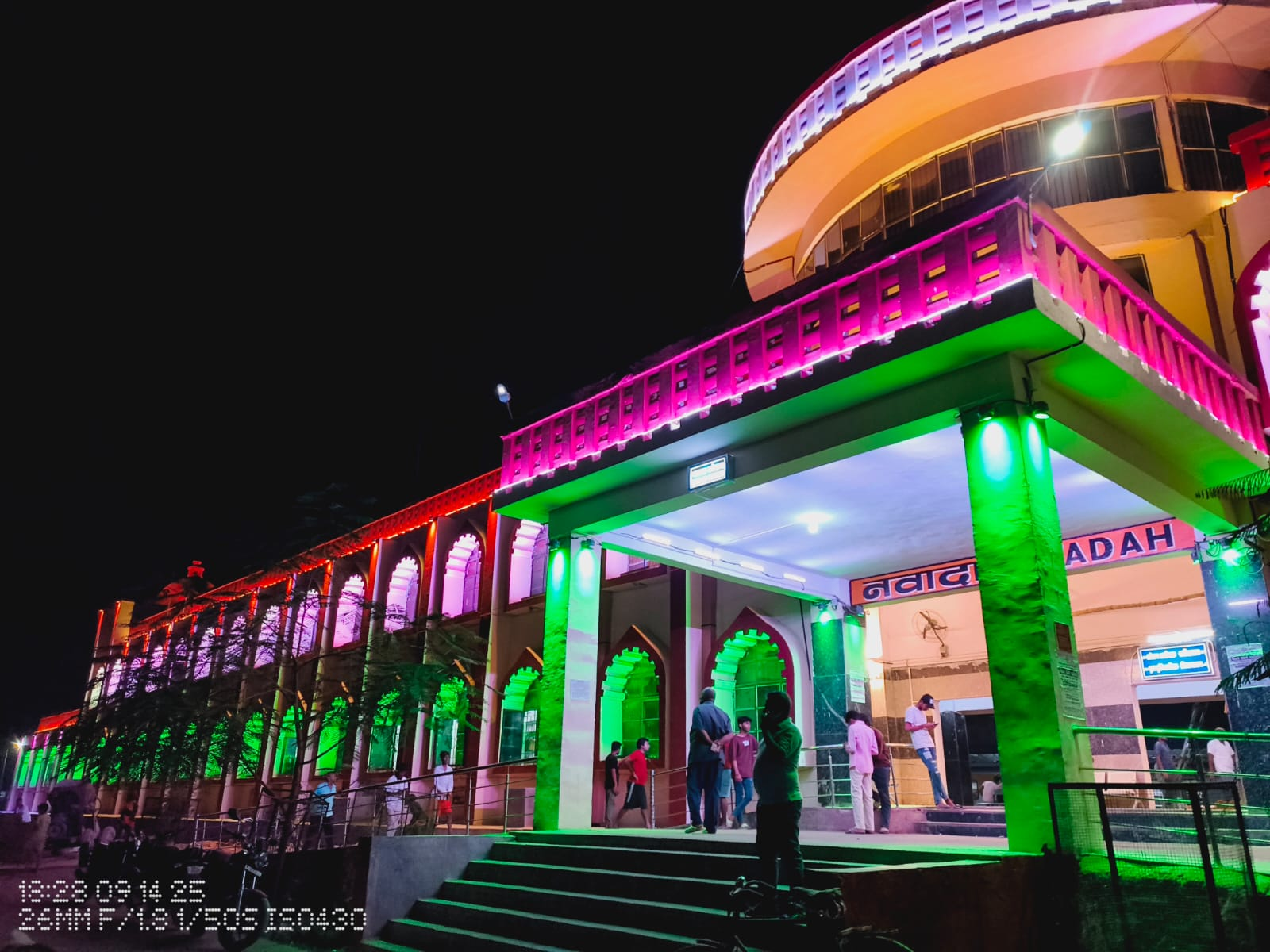
Nawada Station at night

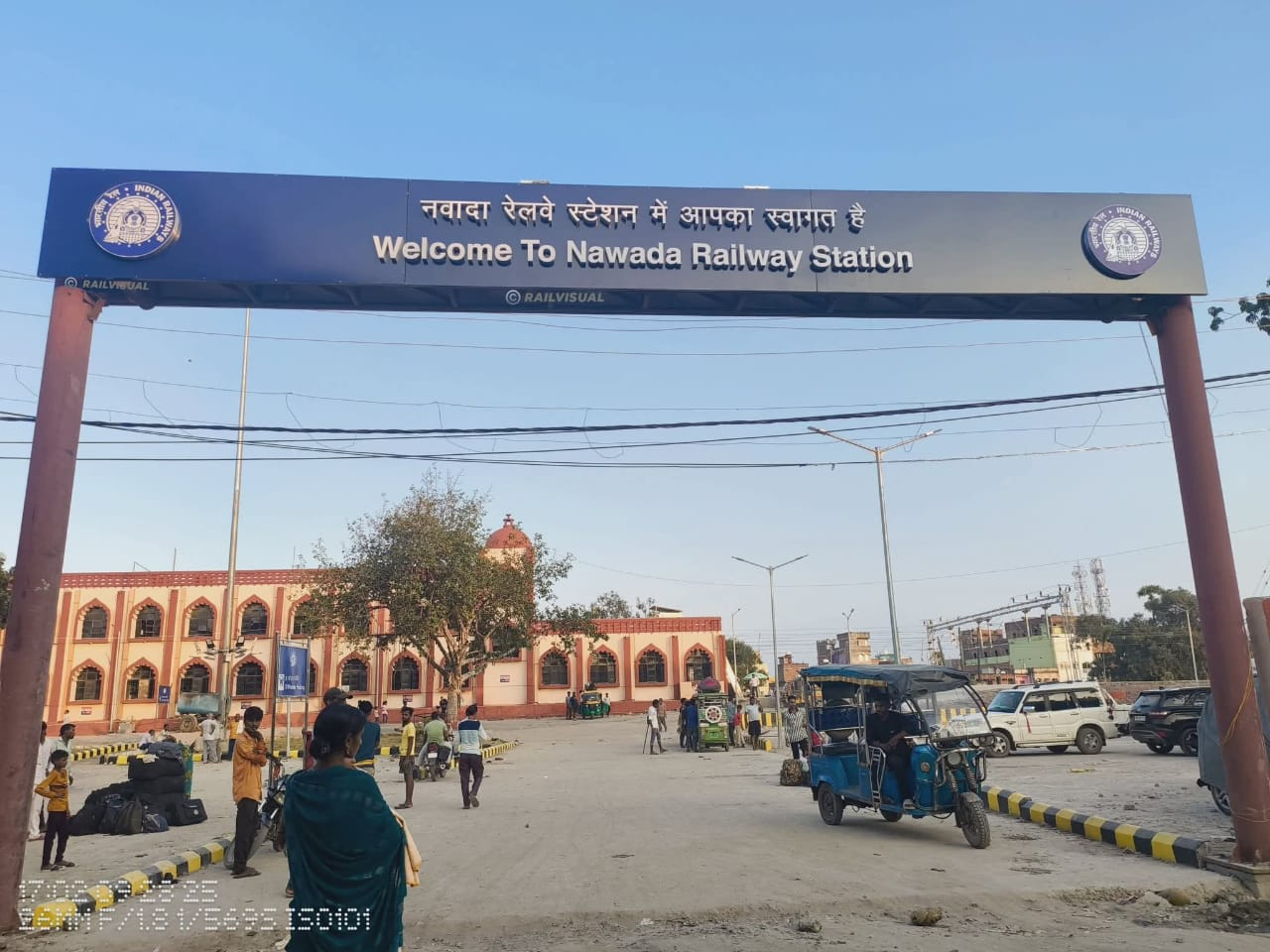
Nawada Station's entrance
