= Chaukhandi =

- Village
- Location in Kanpur, Uttar Pradesh, India Chaukhandi (India)
- Coordinates: 26.84°N 80.03°E
- Country: India
- State: Uttar Pradesh
- District: Kanpur Nagar

Population (2011 Census of India)
  - Total: 590

Languages
  - Official: Hindi
- Time zone: UTC+5:30 (IST)
- PIN: 209202
- Vehicle registration: UP-78

Chaukhandi is a village in Barauli Gram panchayat in Bilhaur Tehsil, Kanpur Nagar district, Uttar Pradesh, India. Its village code is 149943.
