= Prayagraj Rambagh railway station =

Railway Station in Uttar Pradesh, India

Prayagraj Rambagh

General information
- Location: Rambag, Prayagraj district, Uttar Pradesh; India
- Coordinates: 25°26′46″N 81°49′44″E
- Elevation: 316.804 metres (1,039.4 ft)
- System: Regional rail and Light rail station
- Owner: Indian Railways
- Operator: North Eastern Railway
- Lines: Prayagraj-Mau-Gorakhpur main line Prayagraj City–Howrah line
- Platforms: 7
- Tracks: 9

Construction
- Structure type: Standard (on-ground station)
- Parking: Available

Other information
- Status: Active
- Station code: PRRB
- Zone(s): North Eastern Railway Zone
- Division(s): Varanasi
Location
- Location within India Location within Uttar Pradesh

Prayagraj Rambagh railway station is situated in the Rambagh area of Prayagraj in the Indian state of Uttar Pradesh. It also serves as a Terminal station of Prayagraj serving alongside the main Howrah–Prayagraj–Mumbai line. Due to huge rush at Prayagraj Junction the railway will develop as a high facilitated terminal.

== History ==
The Prayagraj-Mau-Gorakhpur main line was constructed as a 1,000 mm (3 ft 3 3/8 in)-wide metre-gauge line by the Bengal and North Western Railway between 1899 and 1913. It was converted to 1,676 mm (5 ft 6 in)-wide 5 ft 6 in (1,676 mm) broad gauge in 1993–94.
