= Bhulanpur railway station =

Railway station in Uttar Pradesh, India

- Indian Railways logo

General information
- Location: BLW, Colony, Varanasi, Uttar Pradesh; India
- Coordinates: 25.2874°N 82.9569°E
- Elevation: 86 metres (282 ft)
- System: Indian Railways station
- Owner: Indian Railways
- Line: Varanasi–Allahabad line
- Platforms: 2
- Tracks: 2
- Connections: Auto stand

Construction
- Structure type: Standard (on-ground station)
- Parking: No
- Cycle facilities: No

Other information
- Status: Functioning
- Station code: BHLP
- Fare zone: Northern Railway & North Eastern Railway

History
- Former names: Oudh & Rohilkund Railway
Location
- Location within India Location within Uttar Pradesh

Bhulanpur railway station is a small railway station in Varanasi, Uttar Pradesh. The code for the station is BHLP. With selective train stoppages, the station caters the local population.
