= Dandupur =

Village in India

Dandupur is a village in the Chaka Mandal of Prayagraj district, India. At a distance of 10 kilometres from Prayagraj, the village almost finds itself in the main city. Very soon, this once village shall witness municipal corporation elections, thereby redefining the limits of the city of Prayagraj and bringing the place within the limits of the main city.

== History ==
The name Dandupur is based on "Dandu" who was the elder son of a zamindar who is believed to be the forefather of the villagers. Dandupur belongs to the Shia Muslim Community and holds up a mixed cultural fabric. It has old mosques and Imambaras that have great historic value. After independence, the ending of the zamindari system and the issuing of the Privy Purse to the zamindars and talukdars from the India Government, last Zamindar of Dandupur Late Mr Inamul Hussain, son of Late Zamindar Mr Ali Jawad was elected the first Pradhan of Dandupur village. At present it is counted as a developed village.

== Economy ==
During the British period Dandupur used to be a rich village with most of the inhabitants owning large pieces of land. However, this has changed after independence as owning lands or the feudal system was abolished. The following generation of the village excelled in the field of education and reached to high ranks in India and abroad thus uplifting the economic position of the village. Nowadays as the economy of Prayagraj has been improving with the influence of that economy of Dandupur has been flourishing. In the new master plan Dandupur will come under Prayagraj city.
