= Godda railway station =

Railway station in Jharkhand, India

GODDA
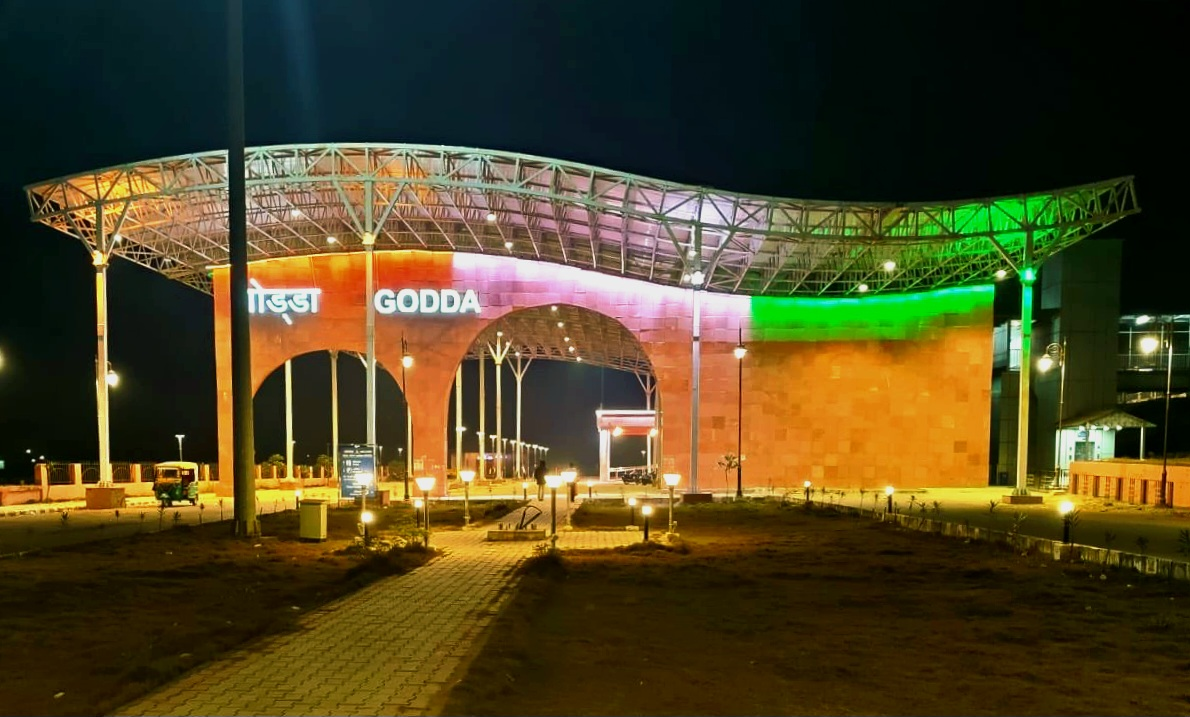
- Godda railway station

General information
- Location: Panjwara Road, Godda, Jharkhand; India
- Coordinates: 24.83°N 87.22°E
- Elevation: 88
- System: Indian Railways station
- Owner: Indian Railways
- Operator: Eastern Railway
- Line: Dumka–Bhagalpur line
- Platforms: 4
- Tracks: 4

Construction
- Structure type: At-grade
- Parking: Available

Other information
- Status: Active
- Station code: GODA
- Zone(s): Eastern Railway
- Division(s): Malda
- Classification: NSG-5
Route map
Location
- Location within India Location within Jharkhand
- Interactive map of Godda

Godda railway station (station code: GODA) is a railway station located in Godda in the Indian state of Jharkhand. It serves under Dumka-Bhagalpur line of Eastern Railway (ER) under Malda Railway Division.

== Trains ==
Godda station has 6 origin trains - 5 Mail Express and 1 Humsafar Express.

- Ranchi Express (RNC - GODA) (Note: runs only on Sunday, Wednesday and Friday)
- Tatanagar Weekly Express (TATA - GODA) (Note: runs only on Tuesday)
- Rajendra Nagar Terminus Express (RJPB - GODA) (Note: runs only on Saturday)
- Gomtinagar Express (GTNR - GODA) (Note: runs only on Saturday)
- Godda-New Delhi Humsafar Express (NDLS - GODA) (Note: runs on Wednesday only.)

== Station layout ==
G	Street level	Exit/Entrance & ticket counter
P	FOB, Side platform, No-1 doors will open on the left/right
P	Track 1
P	Track 2	→
P	FOB, Island platform, No- 2 doors will open on the left/right
P	Island platform, No- 3 doors will open on the left/right
P	Track 3
P	Track 4
	Side platform (Under construction)

== Further expansion ==
As of 2025, work is under progress on Godda–Mahgama section, tender for which is released. The 32-kilometre (20 mi) Hansdiha–Godda section was inaugurated on 8 April 2021 and a Humsafar Express runs weekly from Godda to New Delhi. This line is considered important to connect the Godda district in the Santhal Pargana division of Jharkhand with the rest of India. The 80-kilometre (50 mi) Godda–Pakur line is also planned.

== Redevelopment ==
In 2023, Prime Minister Narendra Modi launched the Amrit Bharat Station Scheme. According to the scheme, the Ministry of Railways will redevelop railway stations across the country. It has been decided to transform 1309 stations to enhance the overall passenger experience including Godda.

== See also ==
- Malda railway division
- Godda

Preceding station	Indian Railways	Following station
Kathoun towards Hansdiha	Eastern Railway zone Dumka–Bhagalpur line	Terminus
