= Antu, India =

Antu, India Antu
- Town
- Location in Uttar Pradesh, India Antu, India (India)
- Coordinates: 26.03°N 81.90°E
- Country: India
- State: Uttar Pradesh
- District: Pratapgarh
- Established: 11-08-1977
- Founder: Babu Shri Bankatesh Prasad Singh

Government
  - Body: Local Body

Area
  - Total: 2 km^{2} (0.77 sq mi)
- Elevation: 93 m (305 ft)

Population (2011)
  - Total: 8,504
  - Density: 4,300/km^{2} (11,000/sq mi)

Languages
  - Official: Hindi
- Time zone: UTC+5:30 (IST)
- Postal code: 230501
- Vehicle registration: UP 72
- Website: up.gov.in

Antu is a town and a nagar panchayat in the Community Development Block Sandwa Chandrika, Pratapgarh tehsil, Pratapgarh district in the state of Uttar Pradesh, India, located 20.6 km northwest of the district administrative headquarters Bela Pratapgarh and 4.7 km northeast of Sandwa Chandrika. The territory of the town covers 2 square kilometers. It is divided into 10 wards. The postal Zip Code is 230501.

Antu belongs to the Pratapgarh Lok Sabha Constituency and the Pratapgarh Vidhan Sabha (Uttar Pradesh Legislative assembly) constituency. Babu Bankatesh Prasad Singh son of Babu Shri Surya Pal Singh had talk with the english government and established railway station in Antu. King of Pratapgarh Shri Pratap Bahadur Singh was relative (Fufaji) of Babu Bankatesh Prasad Singh. He (Babu Bankatesh Prasad Singh) provided water supply by creating water tank in Antu. He made sure that road connectivity should be there with main district in Antu. He also made sure the electricity connectivity in antu.

After the unfortunate death of grandfather of Babu Sahab (Shri Banktesh Prasad Singh) of Antu, his wife (grandmother of Babu Sahab) maharani followed the tradition of Sati. Since then there is a temple of Devi Sati beside Antu Railway Station.

Babu Lalta Prasad Singh, named successor (brother in law of Babu Sahab) of Babu Sahab Shri Bankatesh Bahadur Singh inherited the authority and colonized more people in antu by giving them land. The palace of Babu Sahab is still called purana court. Gate of palace is still there in antu but the rest of palace got demolished naturally. The successor of Babu Lalta Prasad Singh are still there in purana court by building new house beside it.

Antu has become a town now. A vegetable market operatea two days a week at Purani bazaar. Door-to-door garbage collection is made by the government.

The famous temple of Maa Chandika is 4.7 km away from Antu.

== Geography ==
Antu is located at 26.03°N 81.90°E. It has an average elevation of 93 metres (305 feet).

== Demographics ==
According to the 2011 census Antu has 8,504 inhabitants, 4,333 males and 4,171 females, which is a sex ratio of 998 females for every 1,000 males. Its population growth rate over the decade 2001-2011 was 9.9%, much lower than the state average of 20.2%. The literacy rate is 76.9% (males: 88.2%, females. 65.1%), which is higher than the state average of 67.7%. 988 (11.6%) of the population belongs to one of the scheduled castes. There are 1,346 households in this town. The number of all working people is 2,276 including 419 marginal workers

As of 2001 India census, Antu had a population of 7,740. Males constitute 52% of the population and females 48%. Antu has an average literacy rate of 59%, lower than the national average of 59.5%; with 62% of the males and 38% of females literate. 16% of the population is under 6 years of age.

== Transportation ==
Antu is located at the Antu-Bhadar Road, 2.3 northeast of the National Highway 931 (Pratapgarh-Jagdishpur).

Antu has a two platform railway station (code: ANTU) at the railway between Bela Pratapgarh and Raebareli with 20 halting trains per day, including express trains.

== Places of Interest ==
- Purani Bazar of Antu is a very old bazaar of India.
- Maa Jalipa Devi Mandir and Maa Sati Devi Temple (situated from 500 m from Purani Bazar) are famous temples in this town.
