= Gorakhpur Cantonment railway station =

Railway station in Uttar Pradesh, India

General information
- Location: Kuraghat, Gorakhpur, Uttar Pradesh; India
- Coordinates: 26.7510°N 83.4184°E
- System: Indian Railway Station
- Owner: Indian Railways
- Lines: Gorakhpur–Varanasi; Gorakhpur–Narkatiaganj; Gorakhpur–Kolkata
- Platforms: 5
- Tracks: 9

Construction
- Structure type: Standard on-ground station
- Parking: Available
- Cycle facilities: Not available

Other information
- Status: Functioning
- Station code: GKC

History
- Opened: 1914
Location
- Location within India Location within Uttar Pradesh

Gorakhpur Cantonment (also known as GKC or Gorakhpur Cantt.) is a railway station in Gorakhpur, Uttar Pradesh, India. It was originally constructed in 1914. It is currently electrified, with a double electric line track. It is classified as a regular station type. It has 3 platforms with 32 halting trains. It is located in north-eastern India, close to the border of Nepal. It forms part of the North Eastern Zone and part of the Lucknow NER division.

Gorakhpur Cantonment station, along with Gorakhpur Junction forms part of the Gonda Loop, built by the Bengal and North Western Railway from 1886 to 1905. Along with Gorakhpur Junction, Domingarh, Kushmi, Nakaha jungle, Maniram, Sahjanwa, Unaula, Sihapar, and Jagatbela are other stations within the city limits of Gorahkpur.
