= Prayagraj–Mau–Gorakhpur main line =

Indian rail line

Prayagraj–Mau–Gorakhpur Main line

Overview
- Status: Operational
- Owner: Indian Railways
- Locale: Uttar Pradesh
- Termini: Prayagraj Junction; Gorakhpur Junction
- Stations: 51

Service
- Type: Passenger and freight train line
- Operator(s): North Eastern Railway, North Central Railway
- Rolling stock: Diesel locos: WDM-2, WDM-3A, WDP 4 and WDG 4

History
- Opened: 1930; 96 years ago

Technical
- Line length: 330.720 km (205 mi)
- Track length: 356 km (221 mi)
- Track gauge: 5 ft 6 in (1,676 mm) broad gauge
- Operating speed: up to 110 km/h

Prayagraj–Mau–Gorakhpur Main line is a passenger and freight train line operating in the Uttar Pradesh state of India. The line has 51 stations, between its start at Prayagraj Junction to its point of termination at Gorakhpur Junction.

== Operation ==
The Allahabad–Mau–Gorakhpur mainline is owned by Indian Railways, and operated by North Eastern Railway and North Central Railway respectively.

== Technical information ==
The length of the line is 330.720 km (205 mi), with the length of the track being 356 km (221 mi). Using 5 ft 6 in (1,676 mm) broad gauge1,676 mm (5 ft 6 in) track, the rolling stock on the line includes the diesel locomotives; WDM-2, WDM-3A, WDP 4 and WDG 4. The main line is now electrified. There is a max operating speed of up to 110 km/h.
