= Prayagraj Junction railway station =

Railway station in Prayagraj, Uttar Pradesh, India

Prayagraj Junction railway station Allahabad Junction

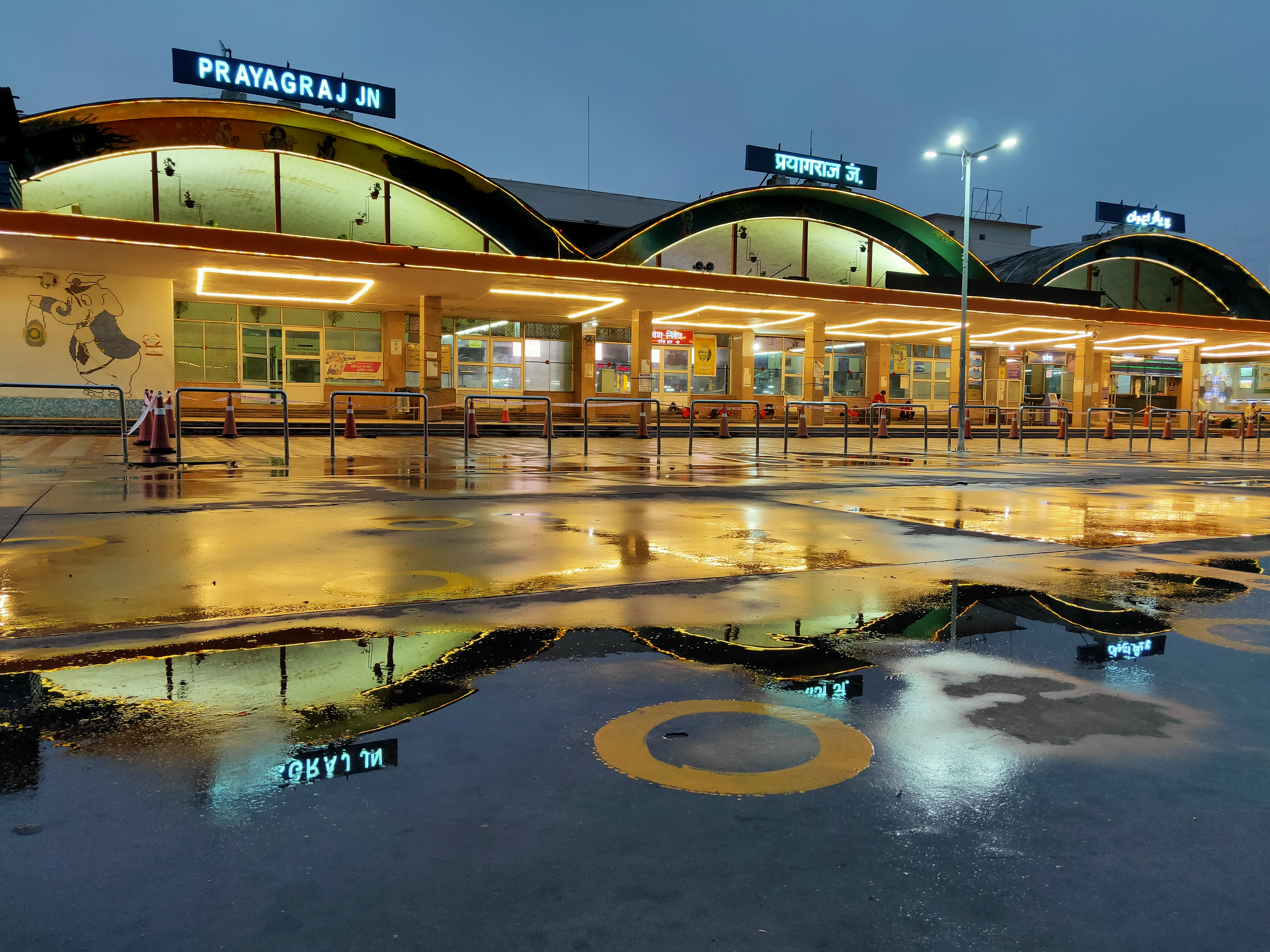

General information
- Location: Leader Road, Prayagraj, Uttar Pradesh; India
- Coordinates: 25°26′46″N 81°49′44″E
- Elevation: 316.804 metres (1,039.38 ft)
- System: Indian Railways station
- Owner: Indian Railways
- Operator: North Central Railway zone
- Lines: Howrah–Delhi main line; Howrah–Gaya–Delhi line; Howrah-Prayagraj–Mumbai line; Prayagraj–Jabalpur section; Mughalsarai-Kanpur section; Mughalsarai-Varanasi line; Mughalsarai–Ayodhya line
- Platforms: 10
- Tracks: 20

Construction
- Structure type: At grade
- Parking: Yes
- Cycle facilities: Yes

Other information
- Status: Functioning
- Station code: PRYJ
- Division(s): Prayagraj

History
- Opened: 1859; 167 years ago
- Electrified: 1965–66
- Former names: East Indian Railway Company
Location
- Location within Uttar Pradesh Location within India
- Interactive map of Prayagraj Junction

Prayagraj Junction (station code: PRYJ), formerly and colloquially known as Allahabad Junction, is a major junction and railway station on the Howrah-Gaya-Delhi line, Howrah–Delhi main line, Prayagraj–Mau–Gorakhpur main line and Howrah–Prayagraj–Mumbai line. It is the headquarters of the North Central Railway zone. It is located in Prayagraj in the Indian state of Uttar Pradesh. It serves Prayagraj and the surrounding areas.

== History ==
The East Indian Railway Company initiated efforts to develop a railway line from Howrah to Delhi in the mid nineteenth century. Even when the line to Mughalsarai was being constructed and only the lines near Howrah were put in operation, the first train ran from Prayagraj to Kanpur in 1859. For the first through train from Howrah to Delhi in 1864, coaches were ferried on boats across the Yamuna at Prayagraj. With the completion of the Old Naini Bridge across the Yamuna through trains started running in 1865–66.

The opening of the Curzon Bridge, across the Ganges, in 1902, linked Prayagraj to regions north of or beyond the Ganges.

The Varanasi–Prayagraj City (now called as Prayagraj Rambagh railway station) line was constructed as a metre-gauge line by the Bengal and North Western Railway between 1899 and 1913. It was converted to broad gauge in 1993–94.

The state government changed the name of the station from Allahabad Junction to Prayagraj Junction in February 2020.

== Electrification ==
The Cheoki–Subedarganj section was electrified in 1965–66.

== Workshops ==
There are engineering workshops of Indian Railways at the railway station.

== Passenger movement ==
Prayagraj is amongst the top hundred booking stations of Indian Railway. The station has two entry sides i.e. City Side to the south and Civil Lines Side to the north.

=== Kumbh Mela ===
The railways make special arrangements for the huge influx of pilgrims for the Kumbh Mela at Prayagraj.

== Amenities ==
Prayagraj Junction is an 'A' grade railway station. It furnishes 3 double-bedded AC retiring rooms, 9 double-bedded non-AC retiring rooms, a 20-bedded dormitory and Wi-Fi for the comfort of passengers. The North Central Railways (NCR) have introduced airport like boarding facility so that the passengers will be issued boarding pass to avail facilities at the junction from new state of the art check-in counters.

== Gallery ==
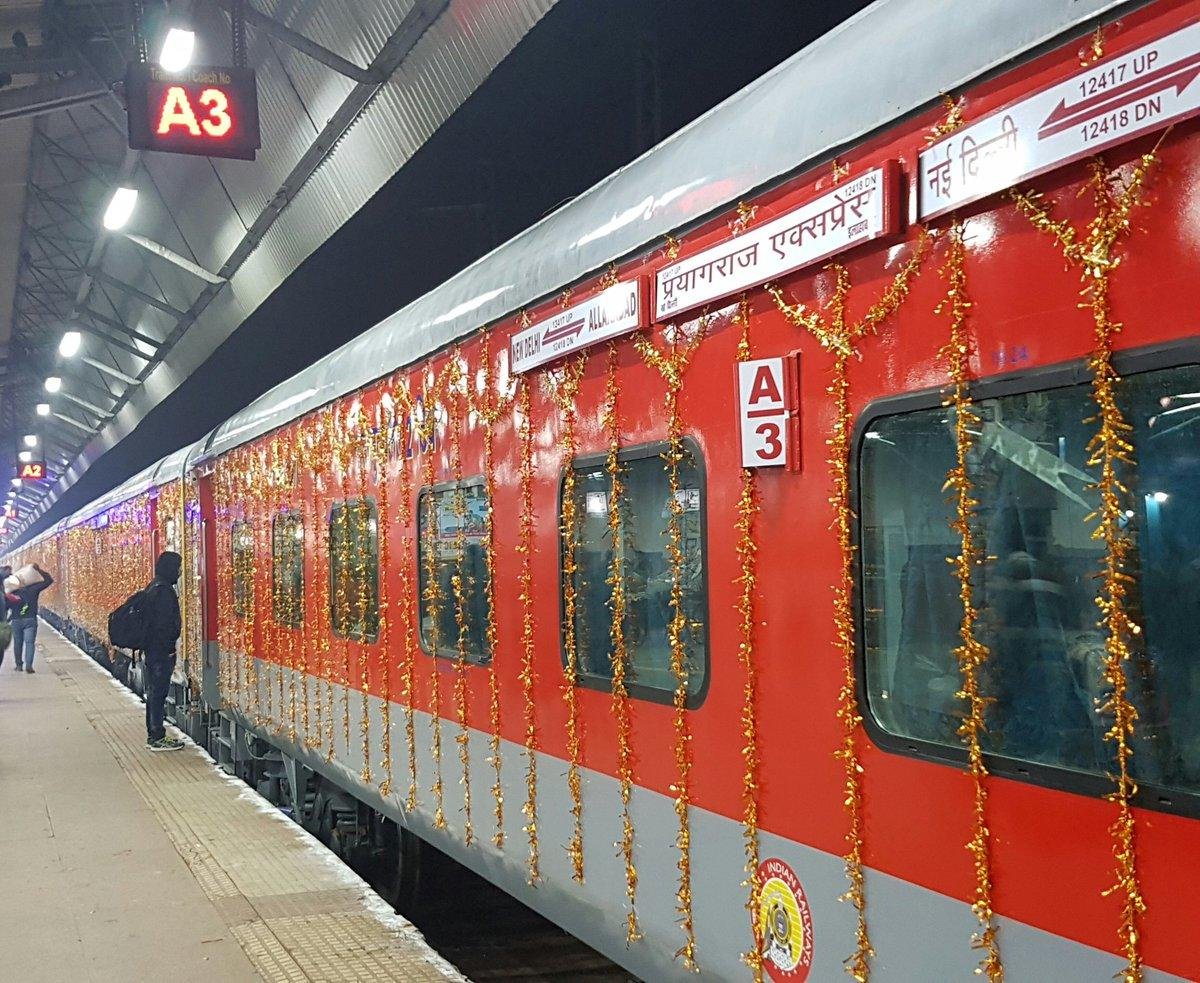
Prayag Raj Express at Prayagraj Jn.

Preceding station	Indian Railways	Following station
Naini towards ?	North Central Railway zone Howrah–Delhi main line	Subedarganj towards ?
Naini towards ?	North Central Railway zone Howrah–Allahabad–Mumbai line	Naini towards ?
Daraganj towards ?	North Eastern Railway zone Varanasi–Allahabad link	Terminus
Prayag towards ?	Northern Railway zone Kanpur–Allahabad link	Terminus
