= Dibiyapur =

Town in Auraiya district of Uttar Pradesh

Dibiyapur Divyapuri, Devipur
- City
- Nickname: Audyogik Nagari
- Location within Uttar Pradesh Location within India
- Coordinates: 26°38′09″N 79°34′24″E
- Country: India
- State: Uttar Pradesh
- District: Auraiya
- Named for: Earlier name Devipur & Divyapuri

Government
  - Type: Urban Local Body
  - Body: Nagar Panchayat Dibiyapur
  - Chairman: Arvind Porwal (BJP)
  - District Magistrate and Collector: Sunil Kumar Verma, IAS
  - Senior Superintendent of Police: Aparna Gautam IPS
  - Member of the Legislative Assembly: Kuldeep Yadav Arjun (SP)
  - Member of Parliament: Prof. Ram Shankar Katheria (BJP)

Area
  - Total: 15 km^{2} (5.8 sq mi)
- Elevation: 145 m (476 ft)

Population (2011)
  - Total: 27,237
  - Density: 1,800/km^{2} (4,700/sq mi)
- Demonym(s): Dibyapur vasi, Dibiyapur vale

Language
  - Official: Hindi
  - Local: Braj Boli (Hindi dialect)

Sex ratio & literacy
  - Sex ratio: 0.864 ♂/♀
  - Literacy rate: 78.65% (Ranks third in Uttar Pradesh)
- Time zone: UTC+5:30 (IST)
- Postal code: 206244
- Vehicle registration: UP 79
- Coastline: 0 kilometres (0 mi)
- Major highways: SH-21
- Climate: Cwa (Köppen)
- Website: auraiya.nic.in
- Main educational and industrial hub of Auraiya district and Kanpur–Agra zone.

Dibiyapur is a municipality-based city in Auraiya district in the most populous state of Uttar Pradesh in India. It is situated on State Highway 21. It is linked to Phaphund railway station on Kanpur–Delhi section of Howrah–Delhi main line and Howrah–Gaya–Delhi line which is operated by North Central Railway. The district administrative headquarter of the city is Auraiya. The city is situated between Agra and Kanpur. Lower Ganga Canal passes through mid of the city.

Many industries including GAIL and NTPC are located in the town. As an initiative, the Government of Uttar Pradesh is constructing Plastic City in the city. Due to industrial settlements, the city has got the name of Audyogik Nagari.

== Location ==
Dibiyapur city is located on State Highway 21 between Auraiya and Kannauj. It is served by Phaphund railway station which is on Kanpur–Delhi section of Howrah–Delhi main line and Howrah–Gaya–Delhi line operated by North Central Railway at a distance 82 kilometer from Kanpur Central railway station and 148 km from Tundla Junction.Lower Ganga Canal passes through the mid of the city.

=== General facts ===
- Coordinates: 26°38′09″N 79°34′24″E
- District: Auraiya
- District Headquarters: Kakor (Auraiya) Mukhyalaya
- State: Uttar Pradesh
- Main highways: State Highway 21
- Main railway line: Howrah–Delhi main line & Howrah–Gaya–Delhi line.
- Serving railway station: Phaphund railway station (PHD)
- Serving bus station: Under construction

=== Surrounding areas ===
- North: Kannauj, Rasulabad
- West: Etawah, Mainpuri
- East: Kanpur, Sahayal
- South: Auraiya, Jhansi

== Transport ==
=== Rail ===
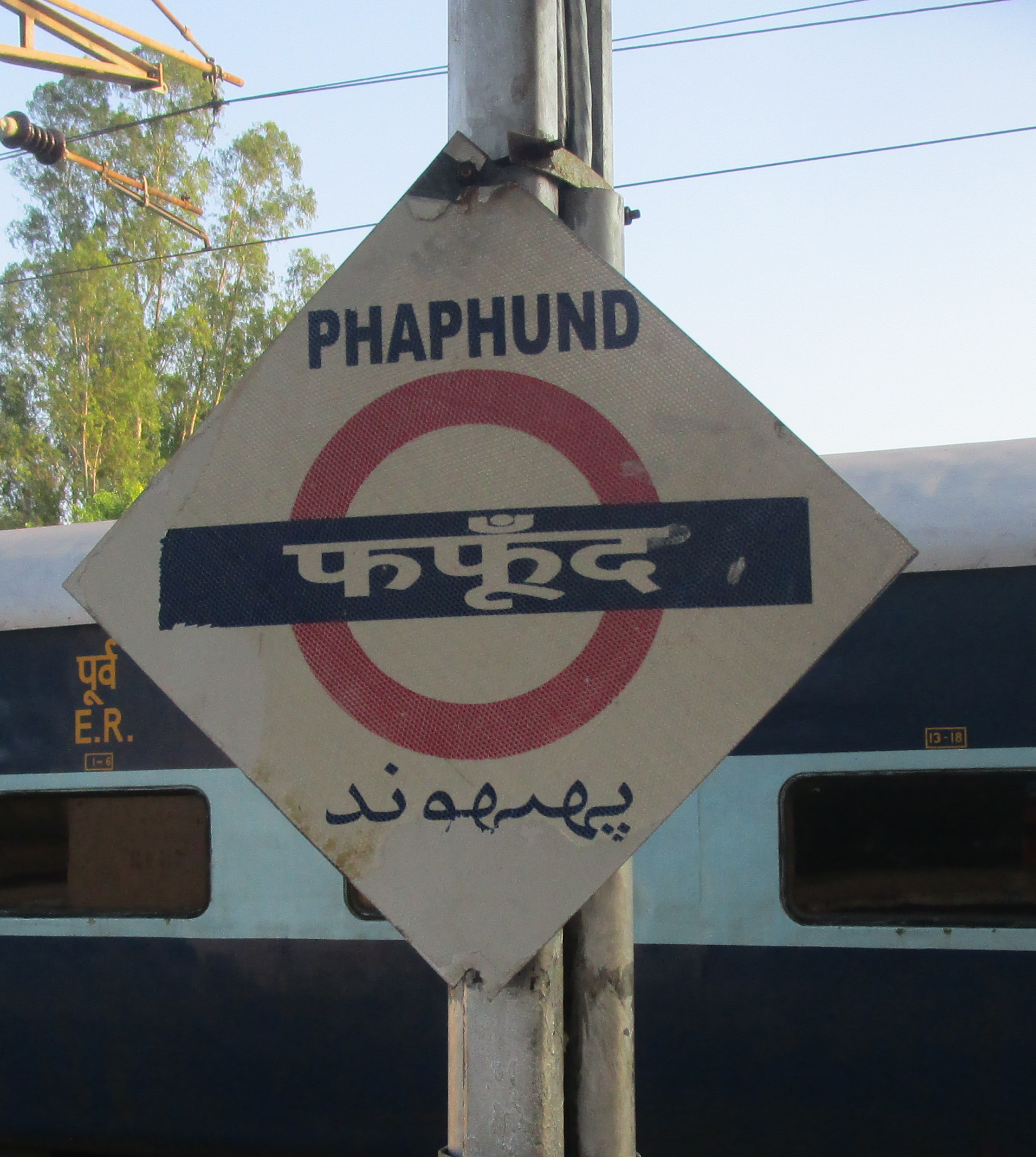
Phaphund (local station of Dibiyapur)

Dibiyapur is served by its local "A" graded Phaphund railway station (PHD) which is located on Kanpur–Delhi section of Howrah–Delhi main line and Howrah–Gaya–Delhi line.

Preceding station	Indian Railways	Following station
Kanchausi towards ?	North Central Railway zone Kanpur–Delhi section	Pata towards ?

==== Train statistics at Phaphund railway station ====
- Number of halting trains: 30
- Number of terminating trains: 3
- Number of departing trains: 3

==== Major trains at Phaphund railway station ====
Some of the trains that are available at Phaphund railway station are below tabulated-

Train no.	Train name	Train type
12179	Lucknow Jn.–Agra Cantt. Intercity	Superfast Express
12180	Agra Cantt.–Lucknow Jn. Intercity Express	Superfast Express
12311	Howrah–Delhi Kalka Mail	Superfast Mail Express
12312	Kalka Mail	Superfast Mail Express
12419	Gomti Express	Superfast Express
12420	Gomti Express	Superfast Express
13007	Udyan Abha Toofan Express	Mail Express
13008	Udyan Abha Toofan Express	Mail Express
14163	Sangam Express	Mail Express
14164	Sangam Express	Mail Express
14217	Unchahar Express	Mail Express
14218	Unchahar Express	Mail Express
15483	Sikkim Mahananda Express	Mail Express
15484	Sikkim Mahananda Express	Mail Express
18101	TATA MURI–HTE–JAT EXPRESS	Mail Express
18102	Jat Muri Tata Express	Mail Express
19037	Avadh Express	Mail Express
19038	Avadh Express	Mail Express
19039	Avadh Express	Mail Express
19040	Avadh Express	Mail Express
64153	CNB–ETW MEMU	MEMU
64156	ETW–CNB MEMU	MEMU
64161	PHD–SKB MEMU	MEMU
64162	PHD–CNB MEMU	MEMU
64587	CNB–TDL MEMU	MEMU
64588	TDL–CNB MEMU	MEMU
64590	PHD–CNB MEMU	MEMU
64159	CNB–PHD MEMU	MEMU
64589	CNB–PHD MEMU	MEMU
64164	SKB–PHD MEMU	MEMU

=== Road ===
Town is well connected by roads. It is connected to major cities like Agra, Mathura, Firozabad, Etawah, Kannauj, Hardoi, Shahjahanpur, Aligarh, Hathras, Kanpur, Allahabad etc. by bus network. It is located on State Highway 21. It is about 25 km from National Highway 19 (earlier, National Highway 2). Also it is connected to Kannauj (distance 60 km), which is located on the historical Grand Trunk Road.

==== Facts at a glance ====
- Local bus station: (under construction)
- Nearest bus station: Auraiya (located 22 km away)
- Main highways: State Highway 21
- Nearest National Highway: National Highway 19 (earlier, National Highway 2)
- Nearest railway station – Phaphund railway station
- Large-scale industries in vicinity – GAIL & NTPC Limited (NTPC).

==== Major places and their distance from Dibiyapur ====
Place	Distance (in km)
Kannauj	64.2 km (via SH 21)
Etawah	70.3 km (via NH-19)
Kanpur	100 km (via SH 68 and NH 34), 112.5 km (via NH 19) and 128.9 km (via NH 27)
Jhansi	223.8 km (via NH 27) and 219.7 km (via MP SH 19)
Auraiya	20.4 km (via SH 21)
Mainpuri	95.7 km (via MDR 134W and Mainpuri–Kishni Rd)
Agra	186.5 km (via NH19 and Agra–Lucknow Expy.) 183.0 km (via Dibiyapur–Kishni–Firozabad Rd.)
Firozabad	146.7 km (via NH19)
Lucknow	200.1 km (via NH19 and Kanpur–Lucknow Rd)
Source:	Google Maps

=== Air ===
The nearest airport is Kanpur Airport located in Chakeri, Kanpur. Its distance from the town is approximately 127 kilometres (79 mi) and is around 2 hours drive from the town.

Nearest international airport is Chaudhary Charan Singh International Airport, Lucknow which is at 170 km from town.

== Administration ==
=== General administration ===
- District Magistrate – Neha Prakash

Dibiyapur comes under the administration of Auraiya district which is headed by the district magistrate and collector (DM) of Auraiya, who is an IAS officer. The DM is in charge of property records and revenue collection for the central government and oversees the elections held in the city. The DM is also responsible for maintaining law and order in the city.

- Superintendent of Police – Charu Nigam

The district police is headed by a senior superintendent of police (SSP), who is an IPS officer.

=== Political administration ===
- Member of Parliament – Prof. Ram Shankar Katheria

Dibiyapur comes under Etawah Lok Sabha constituency.

Prof. Ramshankar Katheria, (BJP) is the current Member of Parliament.

- Member of Legislative Assembly – pradeep kumar singh

Dibiyapur is a constituency of the Uttar Pradesh Legislative Assembly covering the city of Dibiyapur.

Lakhan Singh contested Uttar Pradesh Assembly Election in 2017 as Bharatiya Janata Party candidate and defeated his close contestant Pradeep Kumar Yadav from Samajwadi Party with a margin of 12,094 votes.

He was appointed as Minister of State in a Yogi Adityanath cabinet on 21 August 2019.

- Chairman of Municipality (Nagar Panchayat) – Raghav Mishra

The local-government body is Nagar Panchayat Dibiyapur, which is headed by a chairman.

== Education ==
Dibiyapur is an educational hub in the Kanpur–Agra zone.

=== Notable schools and colleges ===
==== CBSE-affiliated schools and colleges ====
- GAIL D.A.V. Public School
- Kendriya Vidyalaya, NTPC Dibiyapur
- St. Joseph's Senior Secondary School, NTPC, Dibiyapur

==== U.P. State Board colleges ====
- Saraswati Vidya Mandir Inter College, Dibiyapur,

==== Other schools and colleges ====
- Saraswati Shishu Mandir
- Gail D.A.V. Model School
- Vivekanand Gramodyog Mahavidyalaya

== Demographics ==
As of the 2011 Indian census, there were 27,237 people living in Dibiyapur. The male population was 14,323 and females 12,914. Scheduled Castes constituted 4,915 of the population.

GROUP	TOTAL	Male	Female
Total	27,237	14,323	12,914
Children	3,135	1,689	1,446
Literacy	90.3%	82.8%	76.8%
Scheduled Caste	4,915	2,604	2,311
Scheduled Tribe	1	0	1
Illiterate	5,463	2,464	2,999
Workers	25.6%	44.1%	5.1%
Non-workers	74.4%	55.9%	94.9%
Source:	censusindia.co.in		

=== Religion demographics ===
Religion demographics in Dibiyapur
Religion	Percent
Hindus	91.78%
Muslims	7.77%
Christians	0.11%
Sikhs	0.02%
Buddhists	0.04%
Jains	0.28%
Others	0.00%
Not stated	0.01%

=== Working profile ===
Workers in Dibiyapur
Type	Percent
Workers	25.6%
Non-workers	74.4%

Type of working conditions (among working population)
Working type	Percent
Main worker	23.1%
Marginal	2.5%

== Climate ==
The town features mild winters, hot and dry summers and a monsoon season. However, the monsoons, though substantial in Dibiyapur, are not quite as heavy as the monsoon in other parts of India. This is a primary factor in Dibiyapur featuring a semi-arid climate as opposed to a humid subtropical climate.

The lowest recorded temperature in Dibiyapur was 1 °C; the highest was 45 °C.

Climate data for Dibiyapur
Month	Jan	Feb	Mar	Apr	May	Jun	Jul	Aug	Sep	Oct	Nov	Dec	Year
Mean daily maximum °C (°F)	28 (82)	30 (86)	39 (102)	45 (113)	45 (113)	45 (113)	38 (100)	36 (97)	37 (99)	36 (97)	30 (86)	27 (81)	36 (97)
Mean daily minimum °C (°F)	5 (41)	8 (46)	9 (48)	17 (63)	23 (73)	23 (73)	21 (70)	24 (75)	22 (72)	17 (63)	13 (55)	1 (34)	15 (59)
Source: https://www.accuweather.com/en/in/dibiyapur/201419/december-weather/201419?year=2019

== Healthcare ==
Although Dibiyapur does not house plenty of health centers, it still has local hospitals, dispensaries, and clinic services which serve to the health standards. Many medical centers, pathology centers, sample collection centers are located in the town. The town has its local community health center (CHC Dibiyapur), along with many other private hospitals. Residents of the town generally prefer to visit nearby cities like Kanpur and Agra.

The town has its local community health center (CHC Dibiyapur) along with many other private hospitals.

In early period of COVID-19 pandemic when first 4 COVID-19 patients were found in Auraiya district, they were all admitted to isolation centers made in Community Health Center (CHC Dibiyapur).

=== Hospitals and dispensaries in the town ===
- Community health center (CHC Dibiyapur)
- Dr. G. P. Chaudhary clinic
- Krishna Medical Center
- Dhanvantari Hospital
- GAIL Vihar Dispensary
- NTPC Health Center
- Radhey Pediatrics Centers

== Economy ==
Dibiyapur is a notable industrial town in the Kanpur–Agra region. The town is well equipped with industries. Many small scale industries also operate in the town. Agriculture being the most popular occupation in the rural sides of the town, shops, and organised retail outlets also serve as "money raisers in the town".

=== Large-scale industries ===
Dibiyapur is a notable industrial town of Auraiya district which has installations of India's leading public sector enterprises viz.

1. Cycle power plant of NTPC.
2. Pata Petrochemical plant
3. Gas compressor station of GAIL (previously known as Gas Authority of India Limited).

=== Small-scale industries ===
The Rice-mills and Dal-mills are working well. Other than these mills some steel furniture and cement products small scale industries are there in town located at different places. The raw material for these small-scale industries is imported from Agra and Kanpur. Mainly, the rice, pulses and desi ghee is transported at large scale to the other districts and states. In the Dibiyapur town itself the wooden furniture work is on large scale and due to its cost and quality factor, the furniture has made a good place in the market of nearby districts.

== Market places ==
Bhagwatiganj Market located in heart of town, is a main shopping market in Dibiyapur where you can get all sorts of items. Sahayal Road Market and Vedic Market are also prominent marketplaces in the town. Shalimar Shopping Complex located in Gail Gaon is modern marketplace equipped with all types of modern facilities and caters for all needs related to market.

The town also houses a Naveen Mandi Samiti popular in nearby districts and town for being a space of selling and buying wholegrains, vegetables, fruits, and other agricultural-based products. The town houses other three small vegetable and fruit markets i.e. Badi Sabzi Mandi, Choti Sabji Mandi, Vimal Dwar Mandi. Moreover, the town has a good market for milk products like desi ghee, panner, etc. and sweets.

== Modern townships ==
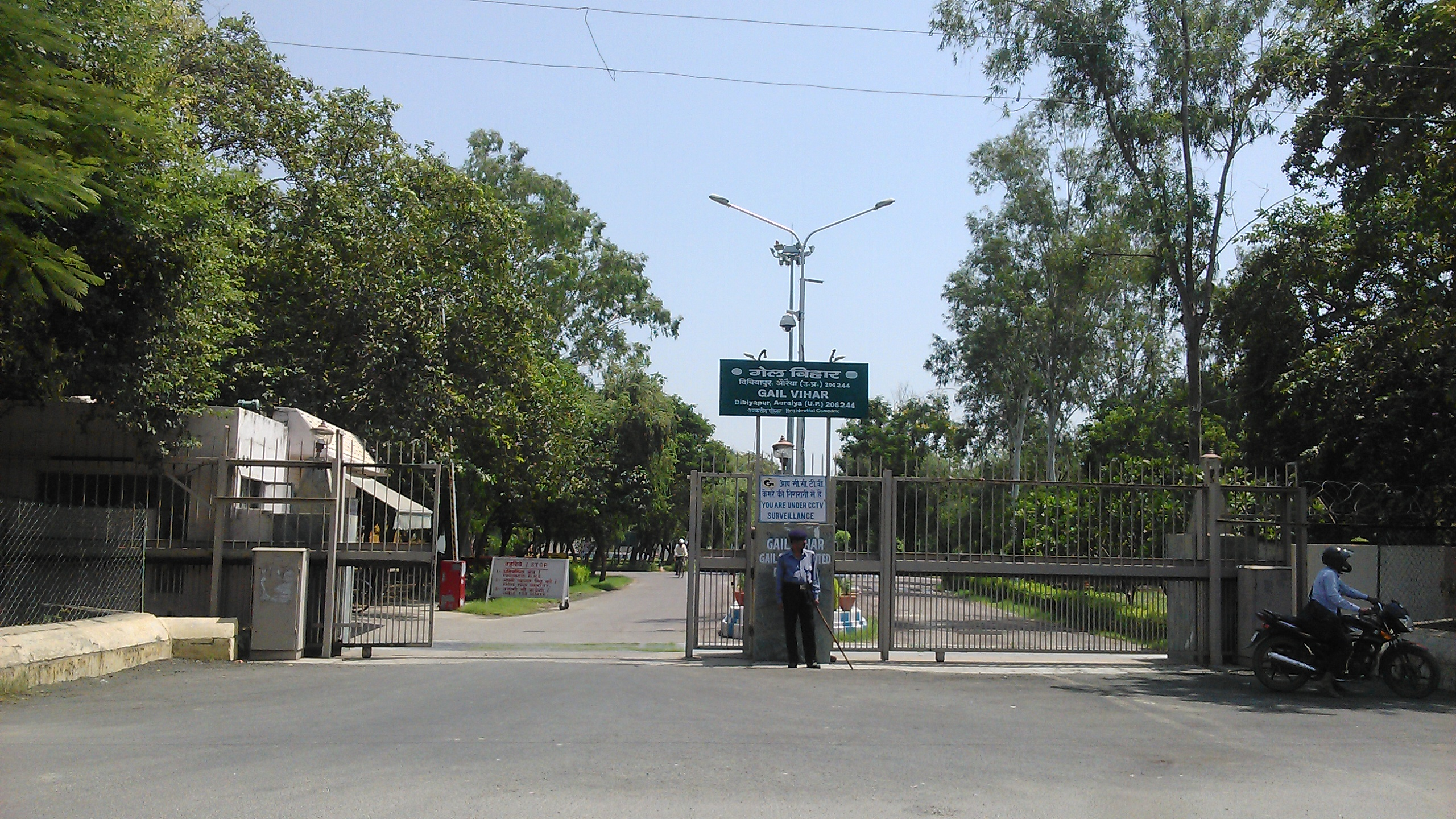
GAIL Vihar

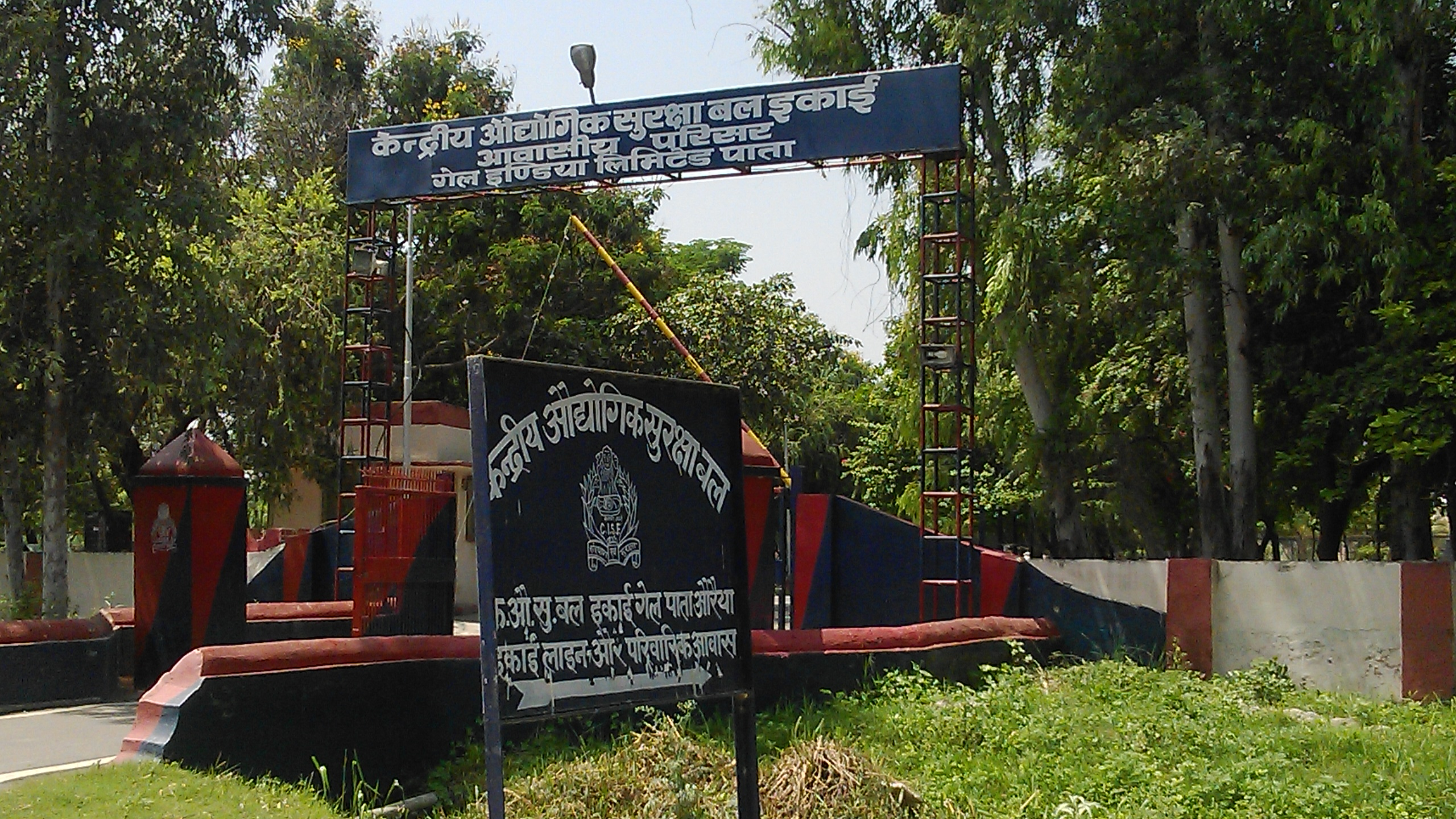
Residential quarters for CISF employees

Gail Gaon is a small township in the outskirts of the city.

GAIL has also established a compressor station near Gail Gaon which has one more residential society named as GAIL Vihar, just like as Gail Gaon, a small, well-facilitated colony.

A residential township is also built named as NTPC Township.

A residential township is also built for Central Industrial Security Force employees at Auraiya Road, known as CISF Township.

The town has a big market named Bhagwatiganj Market in the heart of main town.

== Notable buildings ==
=== Religious attractions ===
- Devi Mahamai Mandir, Gahesar
- Sehud Hanuman Mandir, Sehud
- Sarveshwar Mandir, Gail Gaon
- Panchmukhi Shiv Mandir, Sahayal Tiraha

=== Historical attractions ===
- Pani Ki Chakki, Nahar Bazaar

=== Civic and public buildings ===
- Indradhanush Club, Gail Gaon
- Samudayik Kendra, Alok Nagar (NTPC)
- Sargam Auditorium
- Open Gymnasium, Gail Gaon
- Shalimar Shopping Complex

== Festivals and Carnivals ==
=== Hindu Festivals ===
According to Hindu calendar Vikram Samvat lunar calendar chaitra is considered as first month.

Navaratri & Rama Navami

Festivals of Hindus starts from very first day as chaitra navratri. In the period of nine days festival the forms of Shakti are worshipped. On ninth day birthday of God Rama is celebrated and jhanki of lord Rama passes from the heart of the town.

Rakshabandhan

Raksha Bandhan is also known as Rakhi. On this day sisters tie rakhi on the right hand of their brothers and according to rituals brothers give gift to their sisters and give assurance of protection in any mishap or calamity.

Deepawali

Deepawali or Diwali is one of the biggest and most important Hindu festivals. It is celebrated with great enthusiasm throughout town. It is a festival of lights that it falls on the Amavasya of the month of Kartik every year according to Hindu calendar.

Holi

Holi is a festival of colours. It is celebrated every year on the purnima in the month of Falgun. The festival starts with lighting a bonfire in the mid night. On next day morning colours are spread out by the people over each other.

=== Muslim Festivals ===
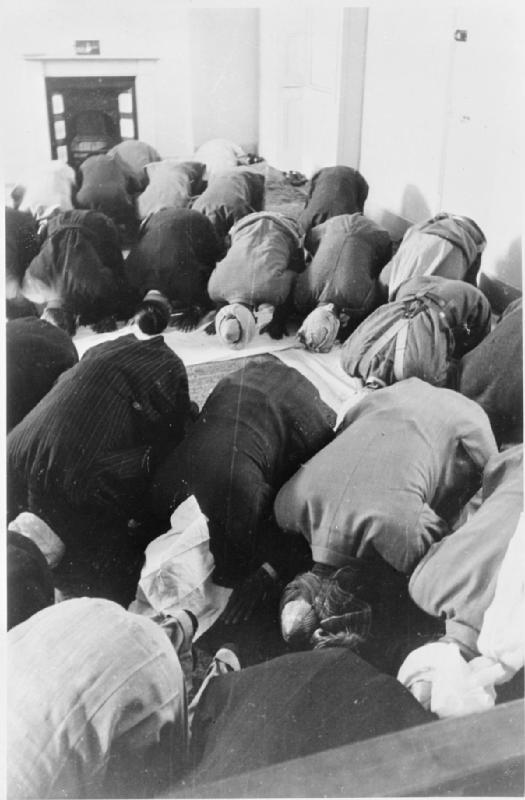
Muslims performing the Eid prayers

The Muslim calendar begins with the month of Muharram.

Muharram The tenth day of this month is spent in great mourning, as it was on this day that Muhammad's grandson Hussain, was killed.

Mawlid (Barah Wafat Celebration)

Id-e-Milad is a festival of both rejoicing and mourning. The festival of Id-e-Milad popularly known as Barah Wafat the twelfth day is one of the important festival in the Muslim calendar. The day commemorates the birth and also the death anniversary of Muhammad. It falls on the twelfth day of the third month Rabi-ul-Awwal of the Muslim calendar. The word 'barah' signifies the twelve days of Muhammad's sickness.

Eid-ul-Fitr

Eid ul-Fitr was originated by the Islamic prophet Muhammad. It is observed on the first of the month of Shawwal at the end of the month of Ramadan, during which Muslims undergo a period of fasting. Thus, Eid ul-Fitr is also known as the Feast of Breaking the Fast and the Lesser Eid. As per the Hijiri calendar Eid ul-Fitr is celebrated on the first day of the month known as Shawwal, it is the tenth month of the Islamic calendar.

Bakra Eid

Eid al-Adha 'Feast of the Sacrifice' also called the Sacrifice Feast. It honors the willingness of Ibrahim (Abraham) to sacrifice his son, as an act of obedience to God's command. Before Abraham sacrificed his son, God provided a male goat to sacrifice instead. In commemoration of this, an animal is sacrificed and divided into three parts: one third of the share is given to the poor and needy; another third is given to relatives, friends and neighbors; and the remaining third is retained by the family.

=== Sikh Festivals ===
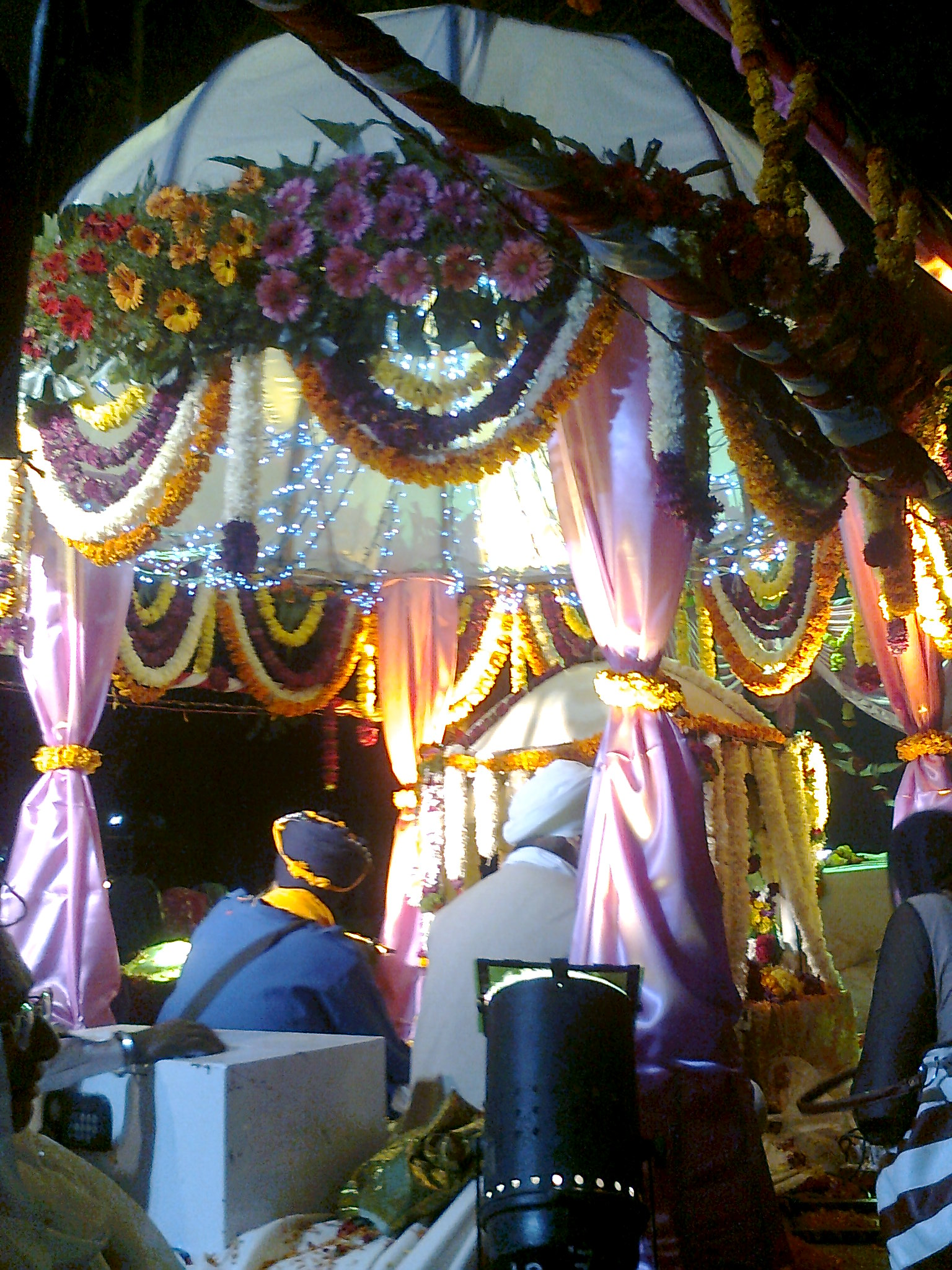
Guru Nanak Jayanti celebration in India

The festivities in the Sikh religion revolve around the anniversaries of the 10 Sikh Gurus. These Gurus were responsible for shaping the beliefs of the Sikhs. Their birthdays, known as Gurpurab, are occasions for celebration and prayer among the Sikhs.

The birth of the Guru Gobind Singh Ji is celebrated as Prakash Utsav in the town as it is celebrated in other parts of country by the Sikh Community.

== Culture ==
=== Fairs & exhibitions ===
- Dibiyapur Pradarshni (Numaish Maidan)
- Navratri Mela (Devi Mahamai Mandir, Gahesar)
- Budhwa Mangal Mela (Sehud Hanuman Mandir)
- Dussehra Mela (Vivekanand Sports Complex)
- Deepawali Mela (Gail Gaon)

== Sports ==
Cricket and football are the most popular sports in the town. Vivekanand Sports Complex at Gail Gaon and Ambedkar Stadium in NTPC Township serve for the outdoor games. Indradhanush Club at Gail Gaon provides facilities of Indoor games and spaces a good Gymnasium and Swimming Pool.

There are several other grounds, or maidans like Vaidik ground, VGM ground, Mandi Samiti ground located in the town. The school grounds of the town have also organised many Zonal level sports tournament like DAV National Sports.

== See also ==
- Auraiya District
- Sahayal
- Phaphund railway station
