= Sahayal =

Rural-based town in Auraiya district of Uttar Pradesh

Sahayal Sahil
- Rural-based town

Government
  - Type: Rural Local Body
  - Body: Gram Panchayat Sahayak
  - Gram Pradhan(Village Head): Lal Singh Kushwaha
  - District Magistrate and Collector: Sunil Kumar Verma, IAS
  - Senior Superintendent of Police: Aparna Gautam IPS
  - Member of the Legislative Assembly: Vinay Shakya
  - Member of Parliament: Subrat Pathak (BJP)

Area
  - Total: 10 km^{2} (3.9 sq mi)
- Elevation: 139 m (456 ft)

Population (2011)
  - Total: 9,825
  - Density: 980/km^{2} (2,500/sq mi)
- Demonym(s): Sahayal vasi, Sahayal vale

Language
  - Official: Hindi
  - Local: Braj Boli (Hindi dialect) with Kanpuriya influence

Sex ratio & literacy
  - Sex ratio: 0.472 ♂/♀
  - Literacy rate: 65.1%
- Time zone: UTC+5:30 (IST)
- Postal code: 206244
- Vehicle registration: UP 79
- Coastline: 0 kilometres (0 mi)
- Climate: Cwa (Köppen)
- Website: auraiya.nic.in

Sahayal is a rural-based town in Auraiya district in the state of Uttar Pradesh, India.

The nearest railway station to the town is Phaphund railway station, on the Kanpur–Delhi section of Howrah–Delhi mainline and Howrah–Gaya–Delhi line operated by North Central Railway. The district administrative headquarters of the town is Auraiya. Sahayal is known for a raw fruit used in the making of Petha, a popular Indian sweet.

== Geography ==
Sahaval is situated near Dibiyapur, a famous industrial city, and Kanpur, the largest city in the state of Uttar Pradesh. It lies 16 kilometres (9.9 mi) from Tehsil, Bidhuna, and 35 kilometres (22 mi) from its district headquarters at Auraiya. Dibiyapur is 9.5 kilometres (5.9 mi) away. Rasulabad is around 18 km east.

The Rind river (also Arind, which shares its name with another river further northwest) borders the southwest region of the town. Sahayal includes a non-agricultural area of 22 hectares (54 acres) and an irrigated area of 790 hectares (2,000 acres).

== Climate ==
Sahayal features an atypical version of the humid subtropical climate. Summers are long, and the weather is extremely hot from early April to mid-October, with the monsoon season in between. Average annual rainfall is about 792 mm. About 85% of the normal rainfall in the town is received during the southwest monsoon months from June to September. August is the rainiest month. The brief, mild winter starts in late November, peaks in January, often accompanied by heavy fog.

Temperatures in the town range from 3 °C (37 °F; 276 K) low to 46 °C (115 °F; 319 K) high. May is the hottest and January the coolest. During the rainy season, relative humidity is generally over 70%. Post monsoons, the humidity decreases, and in summer, the driest season, the relative humidity reaches below 30%.

== Transport ==
Sahayal is mainly connected to nearby cities and towns by roads. It has no direct access to the railway station. The nearest railway station is Phaphund railway station, around 9 kilometres (5.6 mi) away. This station is in the Kanpur-Phaphund-Tundla Sub-section.

The nearest airport is the Chakeri Airport located in Kanpur, 120 kilometres (75 mi) from Sahayal.

== Education ==
Sahayal mostly has state-affiliated schools and colleges. Proper schooling facilities are limited. Some of the schools located in the town are:

- Government Pre-primary School
- Government Primary School
- Government Composite Junior High School, Mandhawan
- Swatantra Bharat Inter College
- Chacha Murlidhar Residential School
- Shyam Sakhi Smarak Vidyalaya Inter College
- Jawahar Navodaya Vidyalaya, Tarapur

== Healthcare ==
Sahayal lacks proper health care facilities. People must travel to nearby cities Dibiyapur or Kanpur for treatment.

Although Sahayal has a primary health care centre, it lacks proper management and treatment. No pathologists or sample collection centres are available. Available health care centres are:

- Primary Health care centre
- Primary Health Sub-Centre
- Veterinary Hospitals are available in this village.

== Administration ==
Sayahal has its own Gram Panchayat, headed by Gram Pradhan. The Gram Panchayat comes under the Block Panchayat Samiti that is located in Sahar.

Sayahal has its own police station

== Economy ==
The main export is agricultural and dairy products. The town has many shops and businesses.

=== Agriculture ===
Wheat, maize, bajra, paddy, and vegetables are some of the many agricultural products grown in the Sahayal. The irrigated area of the village is 791.13 hectares, and from it, boreholes/tube wells occupy 189.89 hectares. Lakes (or tanks) occupy 601.24 hectares and they both are common sources of irrigation.

== Drinking water and sanitation ==
Tap water is available 24/7. A municipal hand pump is another source of potable water. A drainage system is available. Drain water is discharged into the sewer system. Municipal garbage collection is provided.

== Demographics ==
GROUP	TOTAL	Male	Female
Total	9,825	5,185	4,640
Children	1,433	718	715
Literacy	90.3%	72.9%	27.1%
Scheduled Caste	2,956		
Scheduled Tribe	0	0	0
Workers	30.2%		
