= Etah railway station =

Railway station in Uttar Pradesh, India

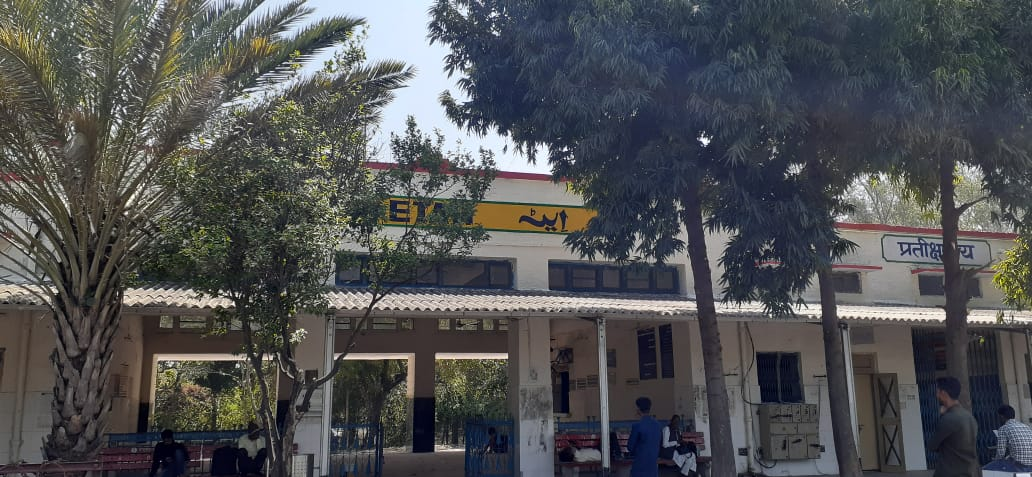
- Etah railway station

General information
- Location: Near Arsh Gurukul, Kasganj Road, Etah, Uttar Pradesh; India
- Coordinates: 25°34′19″N 78°39′15″E
- Elevation: 174 metres (571 ft)
- System: Indian Railways station
- Owner: Indian Railways
- Operator: North Central Railway
- Line: Barhan–Etah branch line
- Platforms: 1
- Tracks: 3

Construction
- Structure type: At grade
- Parking: No
- Cycle facilities: YES

Other information
- Status: Functioning
- Station code: ETAH
- Division(s): Agra

History
- Opened: 1959
- Rebuilt: 2019
- Electrified: 2020–2021

Passengers
- Present 500
Location
- Location within India Location within Uttar Pradesh

Etah railway station is on the Barhan–Etah branch line. It is located in Etah district in the Indian state of Uttar Pradesh. This Railway Station comes under the Agra Railway Division. It serves Etah and the surrounding areas.

== History ==
Trains started running on the Howrah–Delhi main line of East Indian Railway Company in 1865–66. After independence, Etah railway station was established in 1949 by the State Railways minister Mr. Rohanlal Chaturvedi! Etah railway station was inaugurated by the first President of India Dr Rajendra Prasad. After this time passed but the railway resources remained there. From 2000 onwards, the demand for railway line expansion started gaining momentum, which became the major demand of every section since 2005. All the movements took place from Etah to the capital Delhi. How many memoranda and signatures have been sent to the President Prime Minister and the Ministry of Railways, but till now the railway line expansion remains the hope.

== Train ==
Etah - Tundla passenger train started. Which used to take two rounds daily. After that, for the first time in 2019, the Etah-Agra Fort train ran. Which was closed after just 6 months. The Etah-Tundla passenger was also discontinued at lockdown, but restarted in 2021. There are no long distance trains.

== Development ==
- Etah–Kasganj new line work has been sanctioned in the Budget 2017–2018.
- New passenger train service started from Etah to Agra Fort railway station.
- Work is underway on the new railway line between Etah to Malawan for the ultra mega power plant being built in Etah.
- A New route has been surveyed from Etah to Aligarh and there is a demand for connecting it to Mainpuri and Gursahaiganj(kannuj).
- Work is also underway to electrify the track on Barhan–Etah line.
- Work is currently underway at its station to make Etah a big junction and to increase the number of train and freight train.the goal is to connect Etah to Dedicated Freight Corridor.

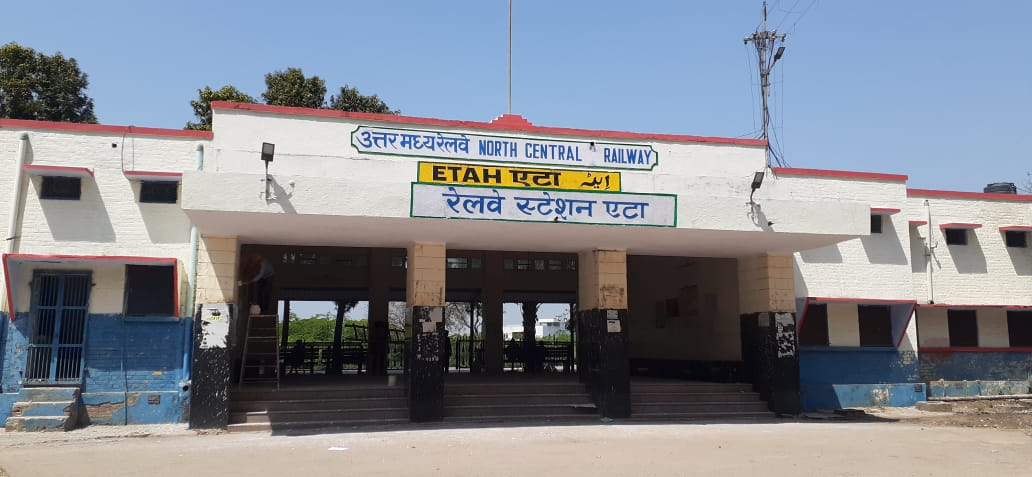

The railway is now going to make Etah railway station a hub for goods trains. So far, only one track has been laid from Barhan to Agra. Its electrification work is on the verge of ending. At the same time, a new track will be laid to erect goods trains on the south side of the railway station. Two tracks will be laid here, so that freight trains can be easily erected. At the same time, the length of the platform will be increased and the signals will be repaired.

== See also ==
- Jaleswar railway station
- Awagarh Railway Station
- Agra Fort railway station
- Barhan Junction railway station
- Tundla Junction railway station
- Hathras Junction railway station
- Aligarh Junction railway station
- Mainpuri railway station
- Etawah Junction railway station
- Agra Cantonment railway station
- Mathura Junction railway station
- New Delhi railway station
- Kanpur Central railway station

Preceding station	Indian Railways	Following station
Terminus	North Central Railway zone Barhan–Etah branch line	Jalesar city towards ?
