= Barhan Junction railway station =

Railway station in Uttar Pradesh, India

Barhan Junction
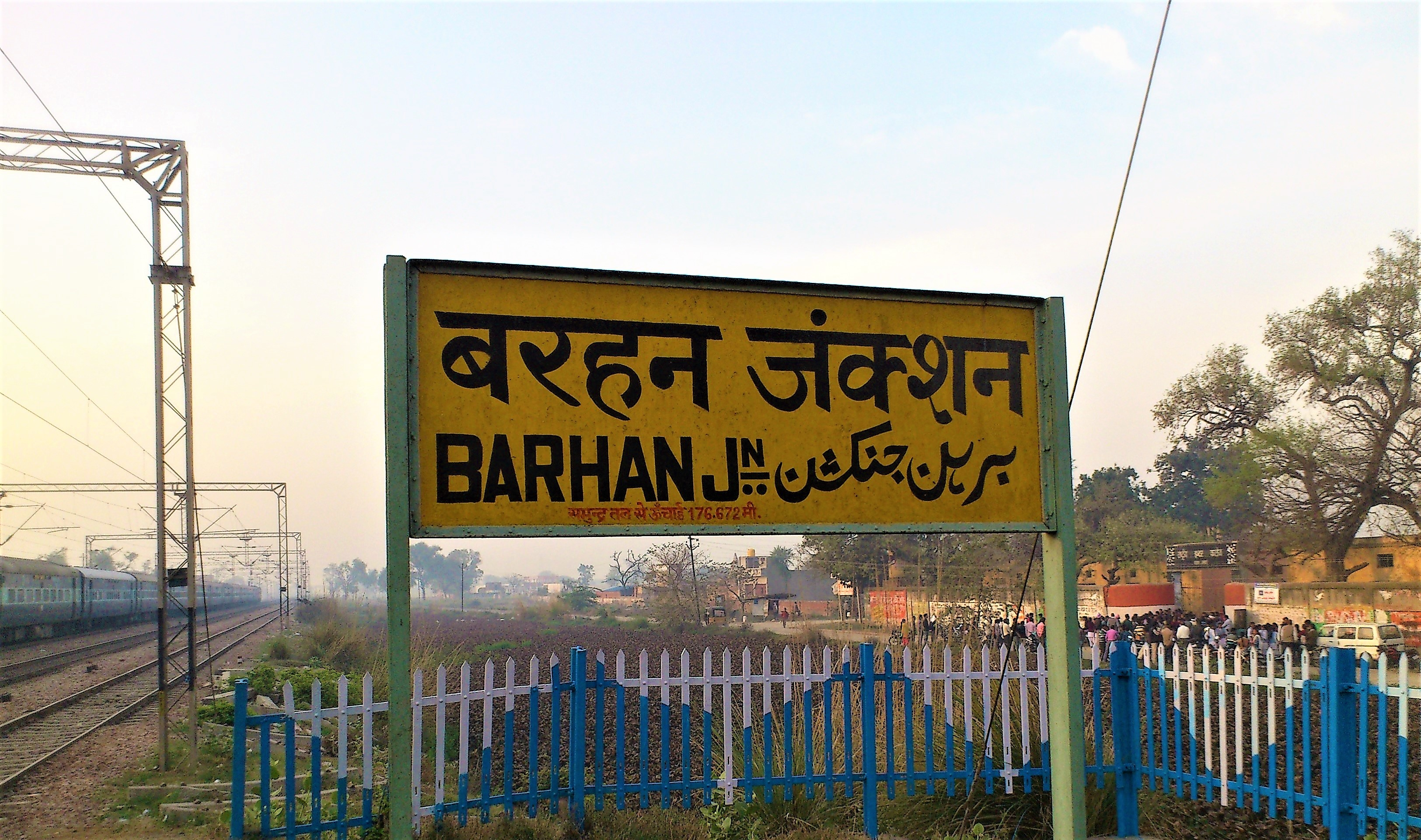
- Barhan Junction station

General information
- Location: Barhan, Agra, Uttar Pradesh; India
- Coordinates: 27°19′45″N 78°11′30″E
- Elevation: 176.67 metres (579.6 ft)
- System: Indian Railways junction station
- Owner: Indian Railways
- Operator: North Central Railway zone
- Lines: Kanpur–Delhi section of Howrah–Delhi main line and Howrah–Gaya–Delhi line
- Platforms: 2
- Tracks: 4

Construction
- Structure type: Standard on ground
- Parking: Yes
- Cycle facilities: No

Other information
- Status: Functioning
- Station code: BRN
- Division(s): Prayagraj

History
- Opened: 1865–66
- Electrified: 1975–76
- Former names: East Indian Railway Company

Passengers
- 5,00 daily
Location
- Location within India Location within Uttar Pradesh

Barhan railway station is a junction station on the Kanpur–Delhi section of Howrah–Delhi main line and Howrah–Gaya–Delhi line. It is located just 38 km from Agra City. The station was built by the British and remains essentially unchanged. The railway station is a site in itself and takes one back to the pre Independence era.

== History ==
Through trains started running on the East Indian Railway Company's Howrah–Delhi line in 1866.

Barhan offers a branch railway Line to Etah.

== Development ==
Etah–Kasganj new line work has been sanctioned in the Budget 2017–2018.

New passenger train service started from Agra Fort–Etah on 10 April 2017.

Barhan–Etah Railway Track Electrification Process Begins

== Media ==
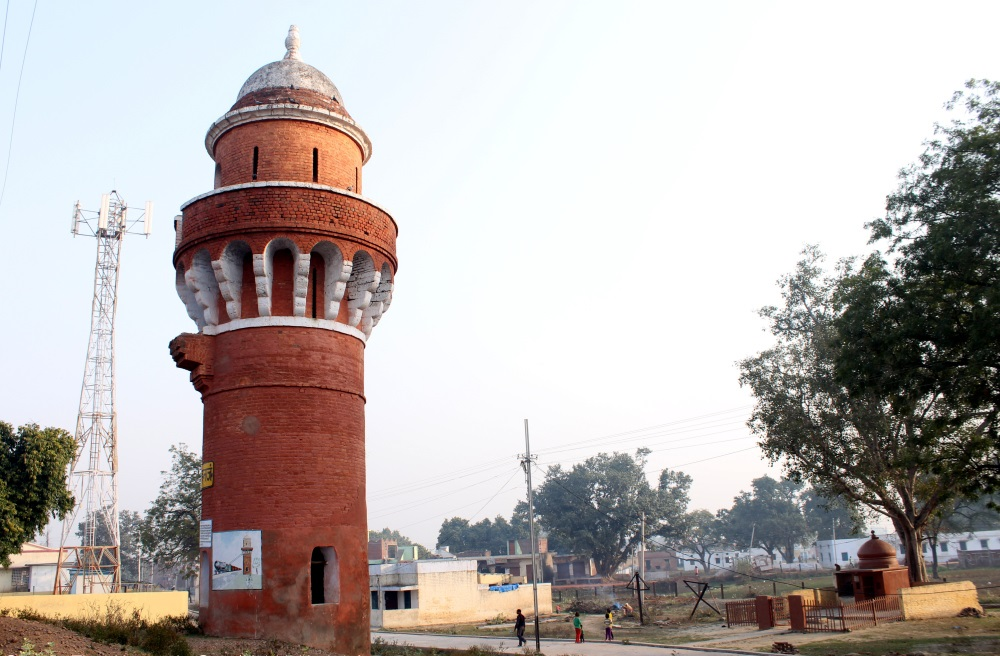
An antique well near the station, used to supply water to steam engines years ago. Barhan Junction (Agra)2

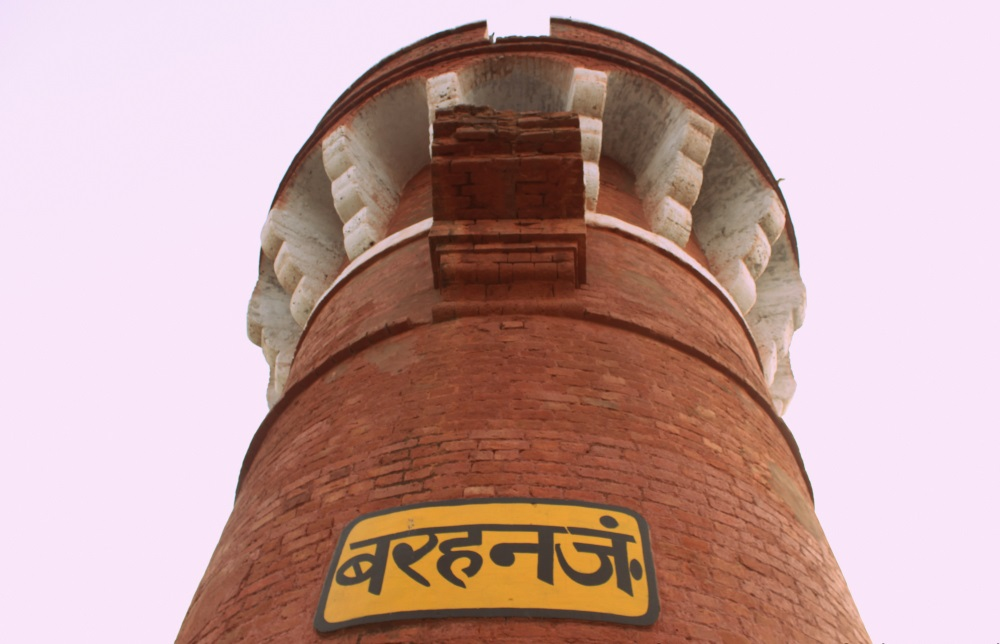
An antique well near the station, used to supply water to steam engines years ago. Barhan Junction

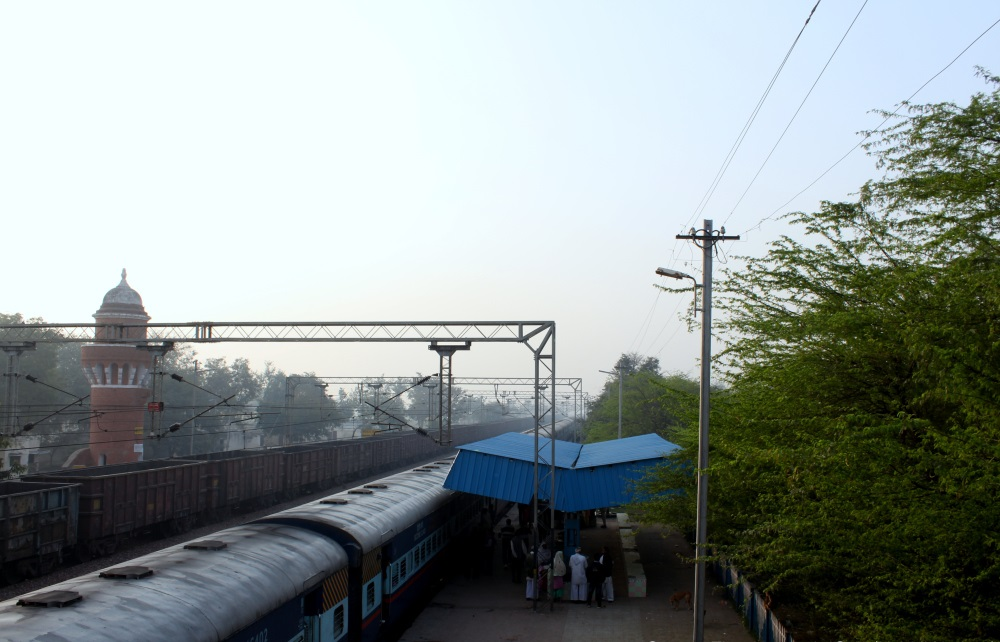
Platform No.1, Barhan Junction

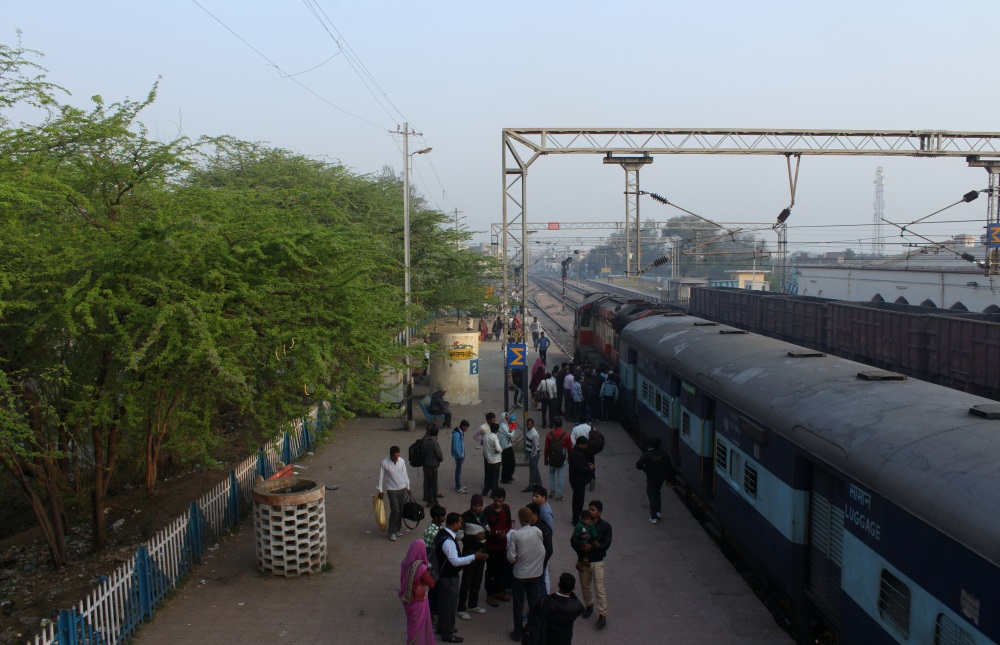
Platform No.1

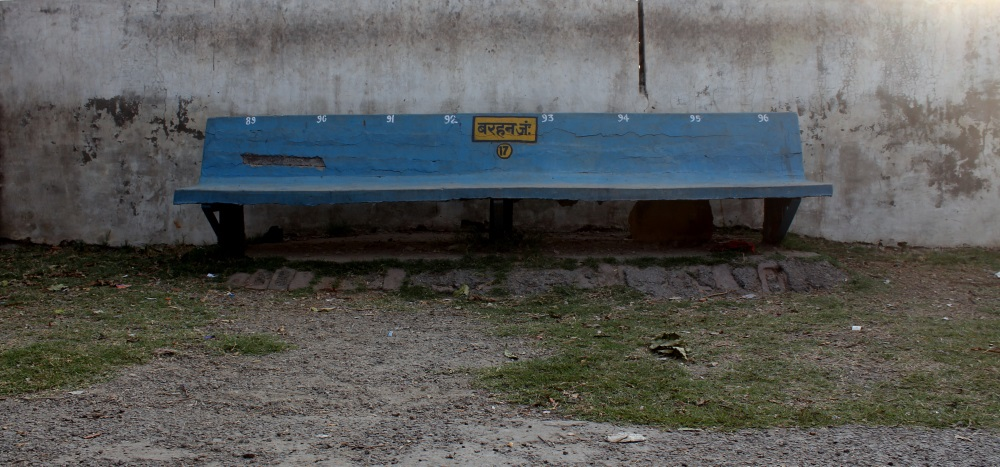
A derelict cement bench at the Barhan station platform

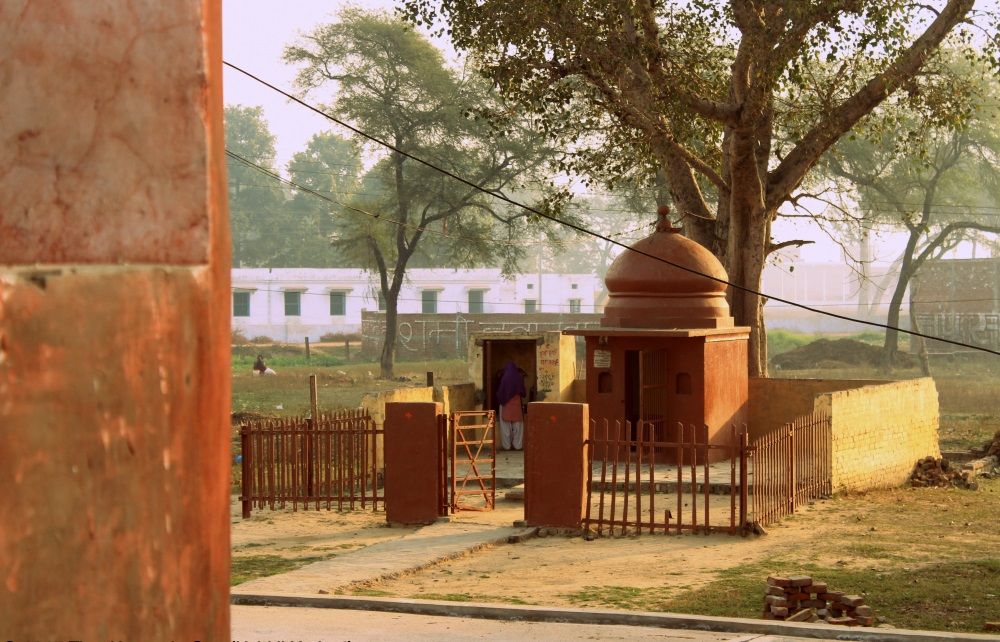
A woman worshipping at a Hindu temple nearby Platform No. 2

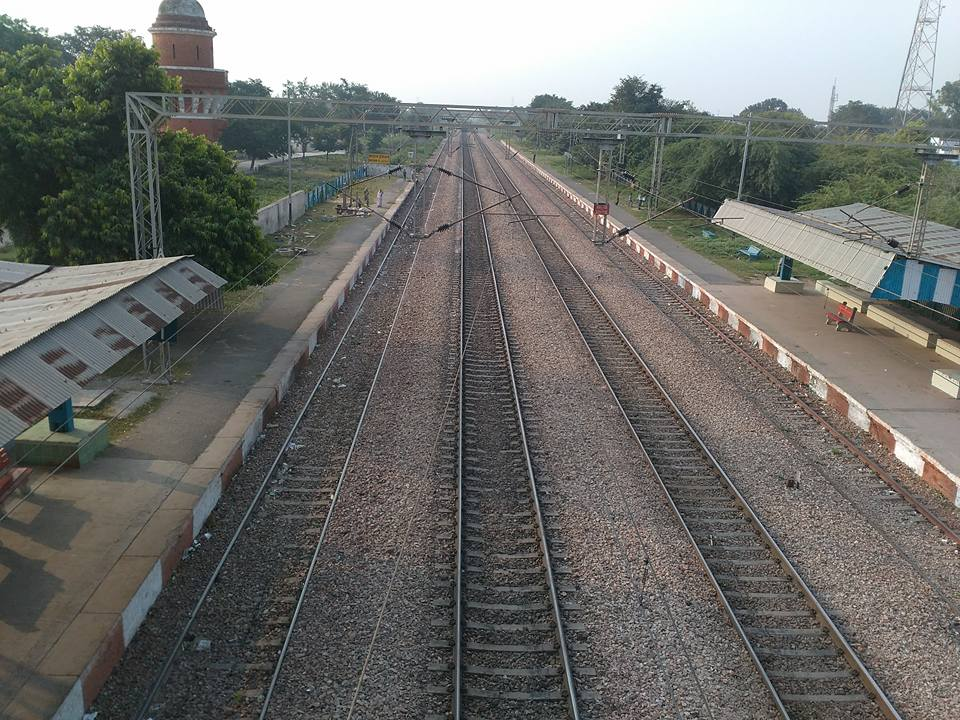
Click from railway foot overbridge Barhan Junction

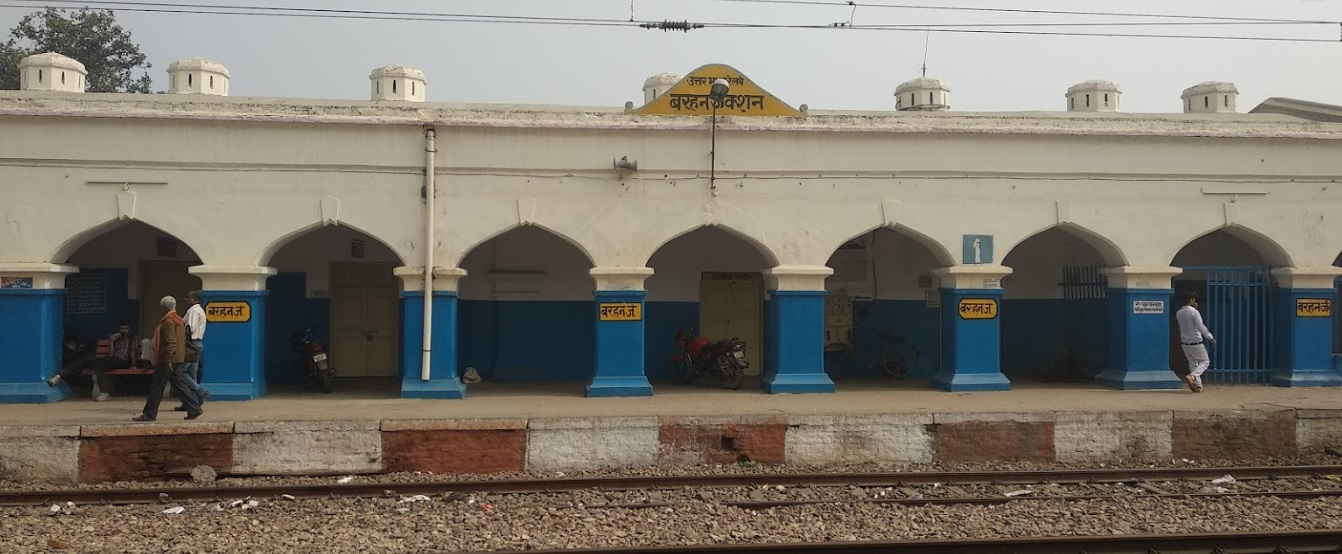
Barhan Junction railway main structure

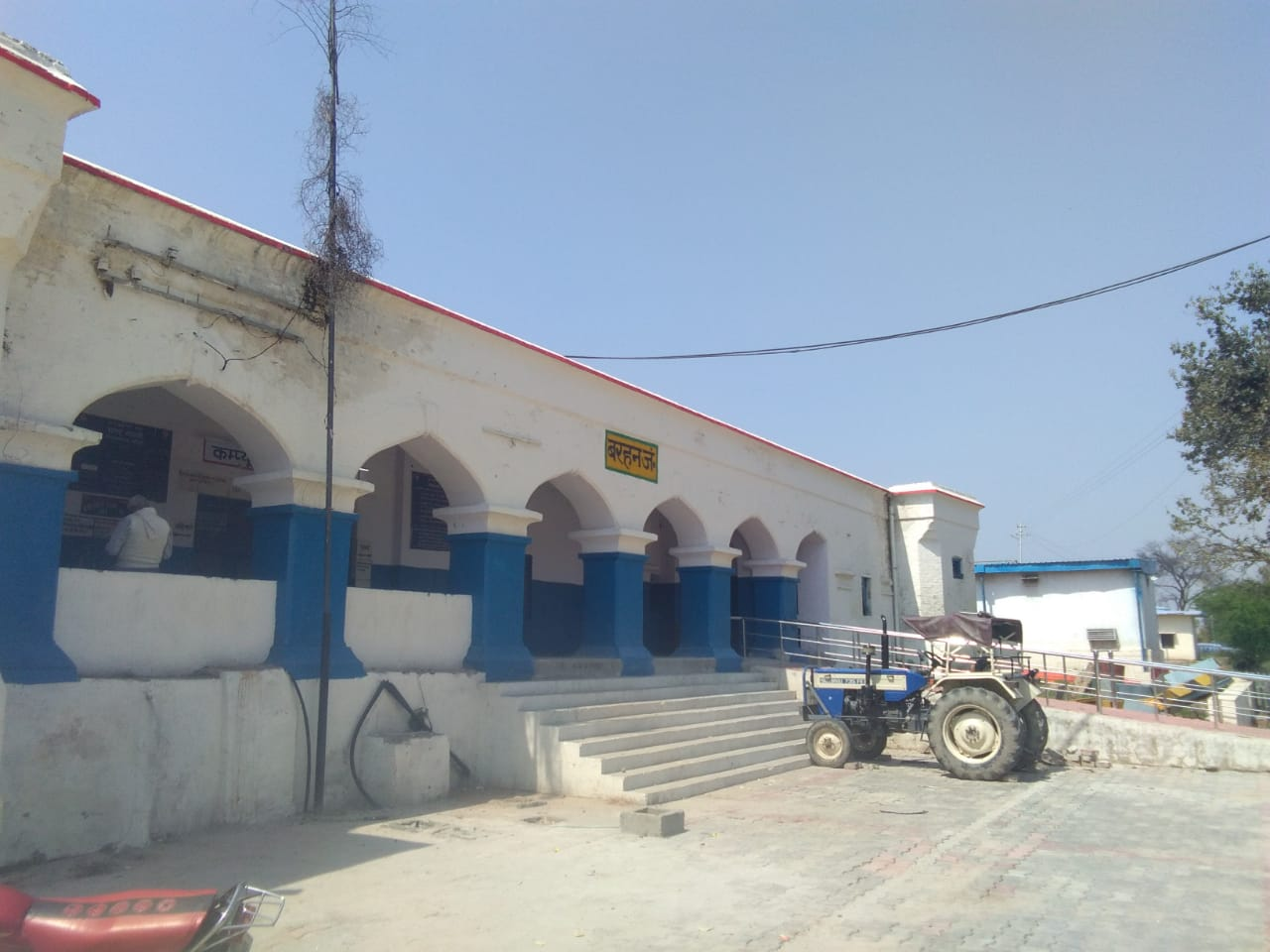
Circulation area

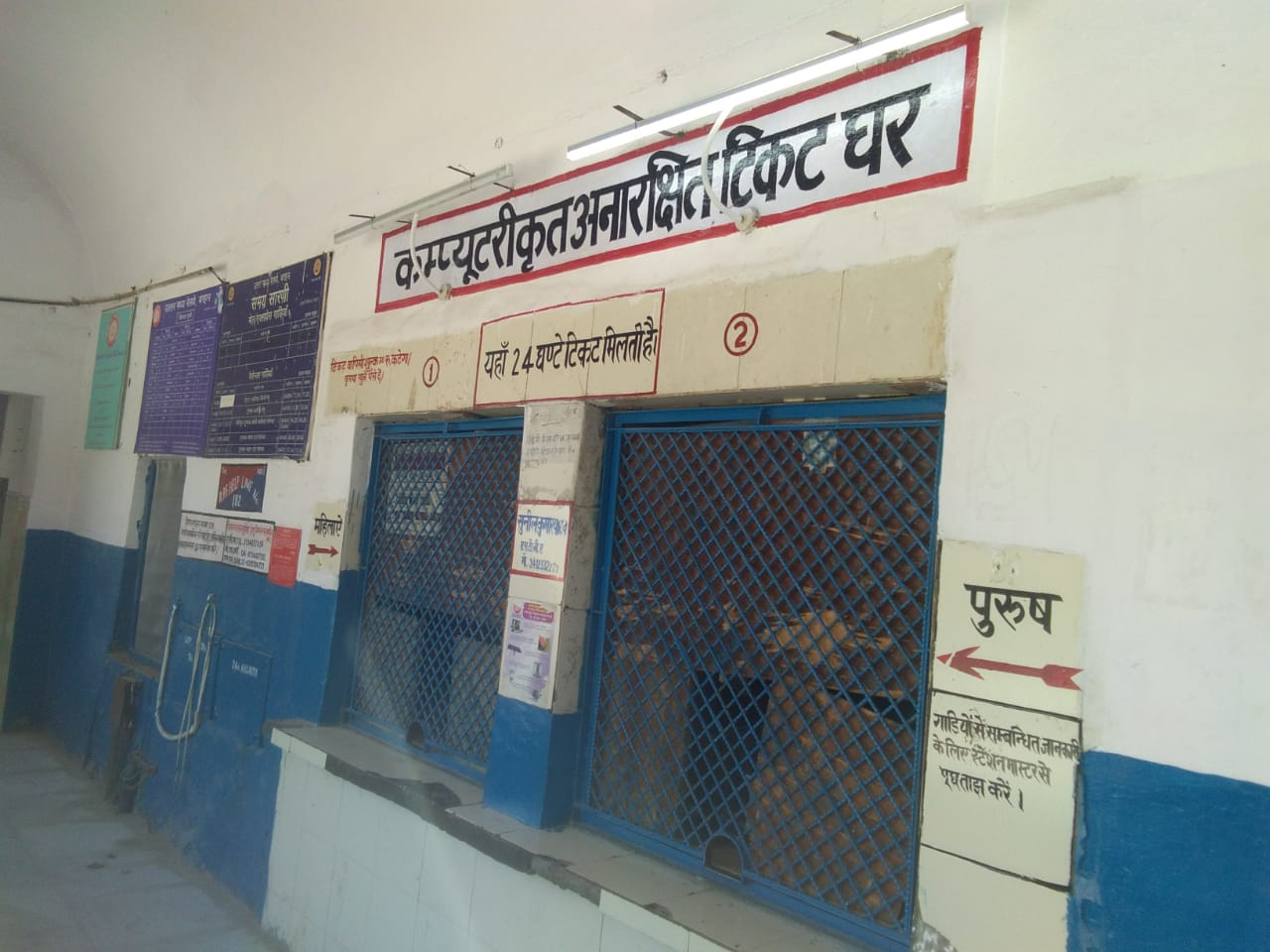
Reservation counter

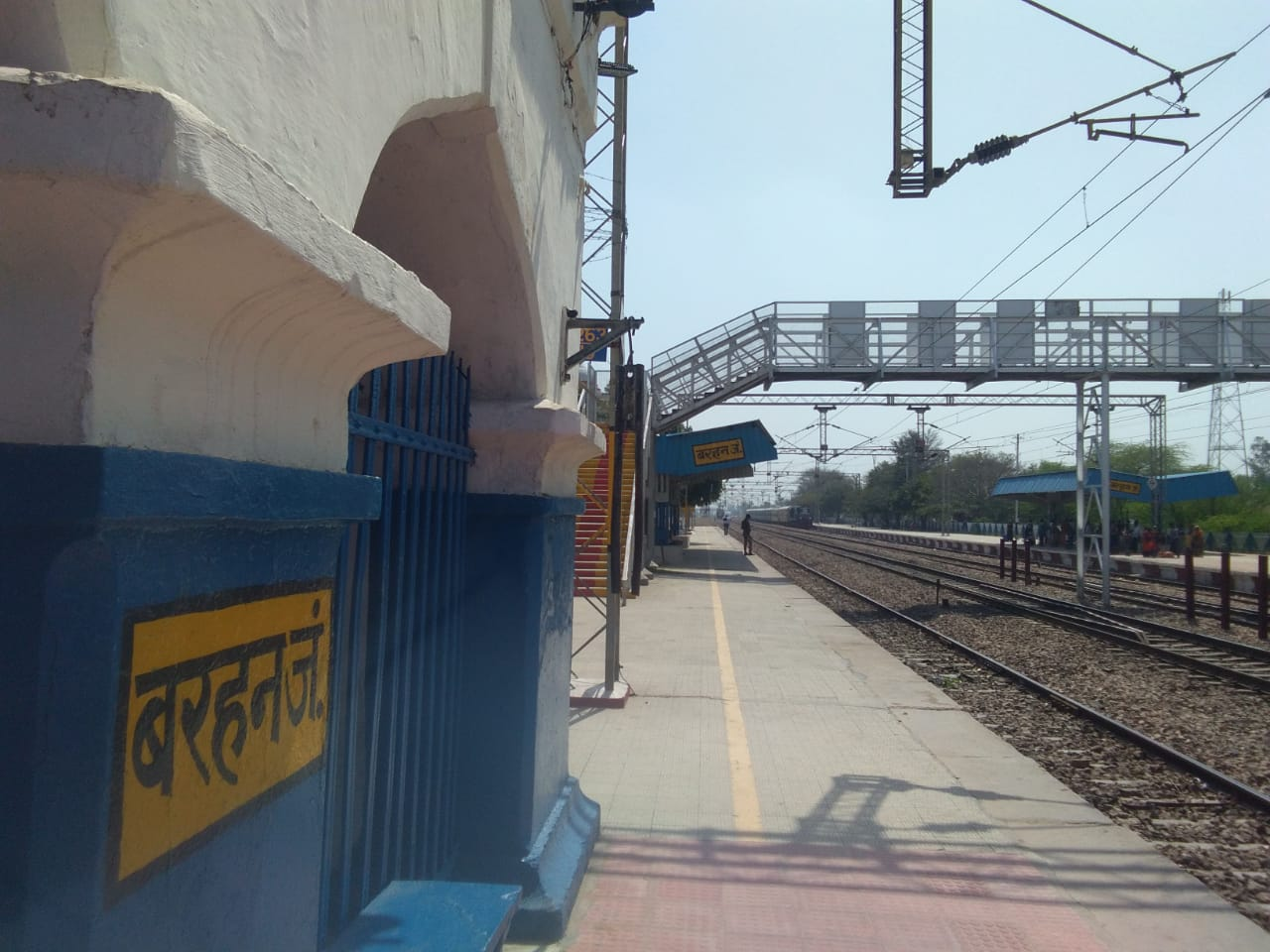
Platform

== See also ==
- Etah railway station
- Tundla Junction railway station
- Agra Fort railway station
- Hathras Junction railway station
- Aligarh Junction railway station

Preceding station	Indian Railways	Following station
Mitawali towards ?	North Central Railway zone Kanpur–Delhi section	Chamrola towards ?
Terminus	North Central Railway zone Barhan–Etah branch line	Shivwala Tehu towards ?
