= Jammu Mail =

Train in India

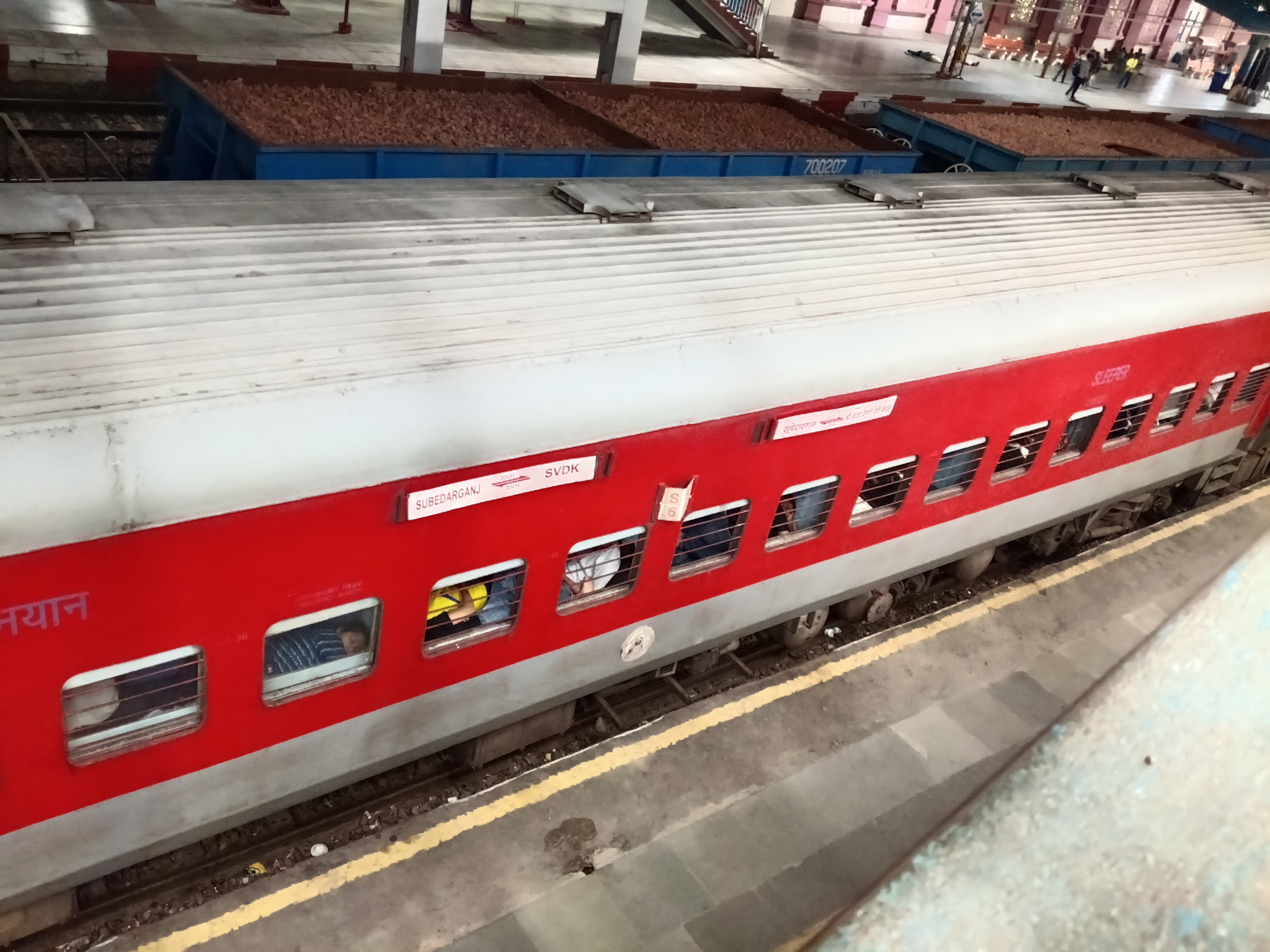
- Jammu Mail At Kurukshetra Junction

Overview
- Service type: Superfast
- Locale: Uttar Pradesh, Delhi, Haryana, Punjab, Jammu and Kashmir
- First service: 29 January 1950; 76 years ago
- Current operator: North Central Railway

Route
- Termini: Subedarganj (SFG); SMVD Katra (SVDK)
- Stops: 29
- Distance travelled: 1,277 km (793 mi)
- Average journey time: 21 hours 15 minutes
- Service frequency: Daily
- Train number: 20433 / 20434

On-board services
- Classes: AC First Class, AC 2 Tier, AC 3 Tier, Sleeper Class, General Unreserved
- Seating arrangements: Yes
- Sleeping arrangements: Yes
- Catering facilities: On-board catering, E-catering
- Observation facilities: Large windows
- Baggage facilities: Available
- Other facilities: Below the seats

Technical
- Rolling stock: LHB coach
- Track gauge: Broad Gauge (1676mm)
- Operating speed: 60 km/h (37 mph) average including halts.

The 20433 / 20434 Jammu Mail is a mail/superfast train which goes from Subedarganj (Prayagraj) in Uttar Pradesh to Shri Mata Vaishno Devi Katra in Jammu and Kashmir. The train was extended up to Katra from Jammu on 1 September 2015. This train was extended from New Delhi to Suberdarganj on 5 September 2024.

A likely accident was prevented by an alert pointsman at Prempur station in September 2024.

== Route & halts ==
- Subedarganj
- Govindpuri
- Tundla Junction
- Aligarh Junction
- Old Delhi Junction
- Sonipat Junction
- Panipat Junction
- Kurukshetra Junction
- Ambala Cantonment
- Rajpura Junction
- Ludhiana Junction
- Phagwara Junction
- Jalandhar Cantonment
- Pathankot Cantonment
- Kathua
- Vijaypur Jammu
- Jammu Tawi
- MCTM Udhampur
- SMVD Katra

== Traction ==
Both trains are hauled by a Kanpur Loco Shed-based WAP-7 electric locomotive from Subedarganj to SMVD Katra and vice versa.

== Schedule ==
Train Number	Station Code	Departure Station	Departure Time	Arrival Station	Arrival Time
20433	SFG	Subedarganj	10:35 AM	SMVD Katra	09:15 AM
20434	SVDK	SMVD Katra	15:15 PM	Subedarganj	12:35 PM

== Coach composition ==
Loco-EOG-GEN-GEN-S1-S2-S3-S4-S5-S6-S7-B1-B2-B3-B4-B5-B6-A1-A2-H1-GEN-GEN-SLR
