= Dhirpura =

Village in Uttar Pradesh, India

- Village
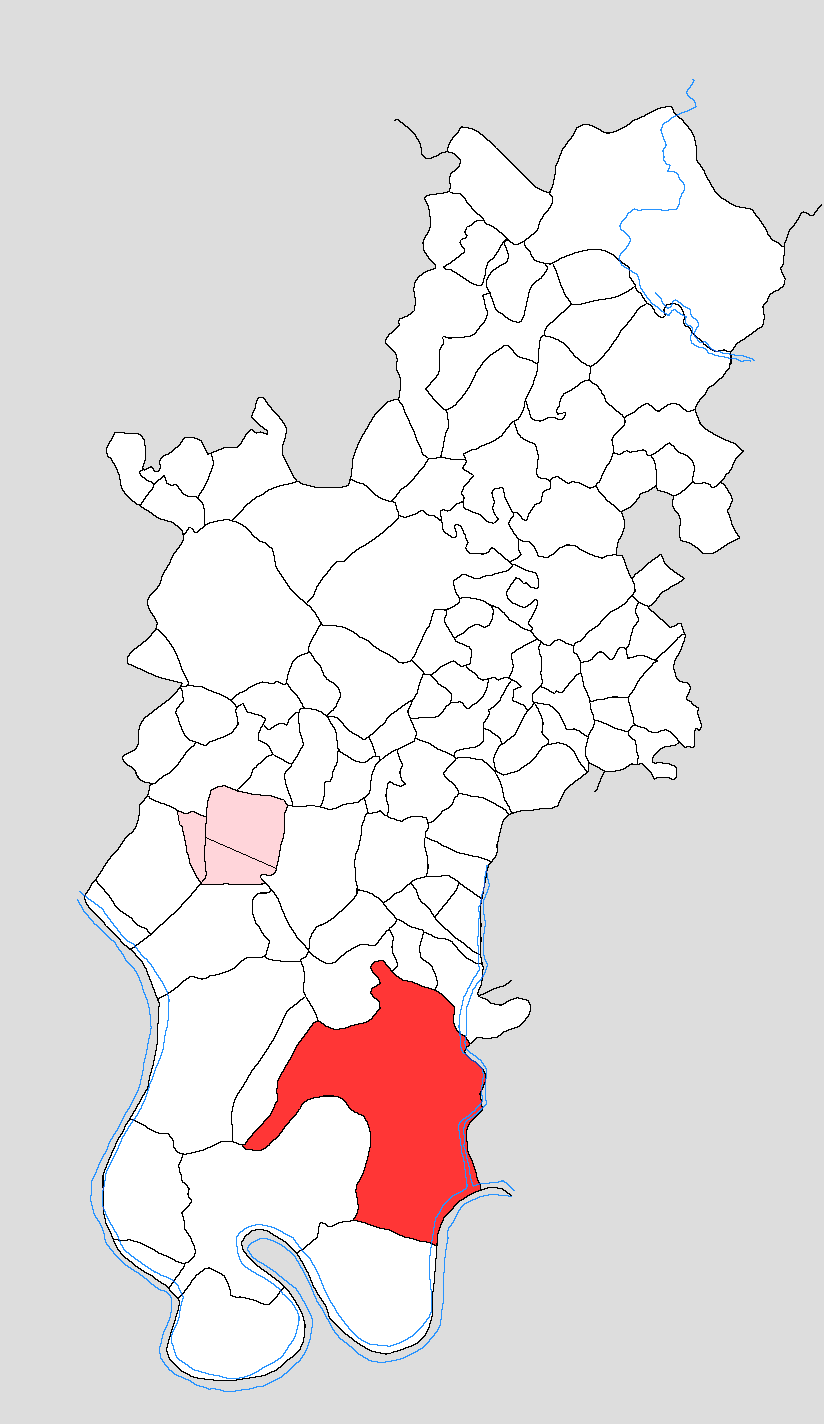
- Map showing Dhirpura in Tundla block

- Location in Uttar Pradesh, India
- Coordinates: 27.14352°N 78.28124°E
- Country: India
- State: Uttar Pradesh
- District: Firozabad
- Tehsil: Tundla

Area
  - Total: 24.641 km^{2} (9.514 sq mi)

Population (2011)
  - Total: 14,478
  - Density: 587.56/km^{2} (1,521.8/sq mi)
- Time zone: UTC+5:30 (IST)
- PIN: 283204

Dhirpura (Dhīrpurā) is a large village in Tundla block and tehsil of Firozabad district, Uttar Pradesh. It is located in the southeastern corner of the tehsil, on the north bank of the Yamuna river. Besides the main site, there are also numerous outlying hamlets. As of 2011, Dhirpura has a population of 14,478, in 2,210 households.

== Geography ==
Dhirpura is a large and spread out village, with over a dozen outlying hamlets besides the main site. The main site is located about 10 km southeast of Tundla. The village lands extend to the bank of the Yamuna on the south, while the eastern border is formed by a small stream called the Jhirna. The Jhirna also marks the tehsil boundary, with Firozabad on the other side. The southern half of Dhirpura's village lands consists of the rugged high ground above the steep slopes down to the bank of the Yamuna; this area is cut up by numerous ravines. The soil in this area is tough and poor for agriculture.

== History ==
According to tradition, Dhirpura was founded by a Chauhan named Dhir Singh; it later came into the possession of one Mahajit Singh of Barhan. His heirs still held half the village in the early 20th century. The other half had previously belonged to one Har Lal Singh, who in December 1857 had begun a series of raids on the surrounding countryside (whether this had any connection to the ongoing uprising of 1857 is not stated). After he was defeated in February 1858, his lands were confiscated by the British and granted to a contractor from Agra named Joti Parshad, who had previously been leasing the lands from Har Lal Singh. When Joti Parshad died, Dhirpura was auctioned off and bought by one Seth Chunni Lal of Belanganj near Agra. A village bank was opened at Dhirpura in 1901, as one of the first five in what was then Agra district. Besides the bank, it also had a lower primary school and a small market at that point. One of Dhirpura's main products at the time was tobacco, which was sold to merchants at the local market. As of 1901, the village's population was 3,671; besides the main site, there were also 16 outlying hamlets.

== Demographics ==
As of 2011, Dhirpura had a population of 14,478, in 2,210 households. This population was 53.9% male (7,797) and 46.1% female (6,681). The 0-6 age group numbered 2,350 (1,259 male and 1,091 female), making up 16.2% of the total population. 1,614 residents were members of Scheduled Castes, or 11.1% of the total.

The 1981 census recorded Dhirpura (as "Dhirpur") as having a population of 9,161 people (4,976 male and 4,185 female), in 1,412 households and 1,393 physical houses.

The 1961 census recorded Dhirpura as comprising 18 hamlets, with a total population of 6,179 people (3,291 male and 2,888 female), in 989 households and 823 physical houses. The area of the village was given as 6,044 acres and it had a post office at that point.

The 1951 census recorded Dhirpura as comprising 17 hamlets, with a total population of 4,862 people (2,581 male and 2,281 female), in 586 households and 577 physical houses. It had a primary school which had 92 students in attendance on 1 January of that year.

== Culture ==
Dhirpura is (or was) the site of a large wrestling fair, during the month of Chait. At the turn of the 20th century, its attendance was about 10,000 people. The 1961 census handbook for Agra district, however, did not list this as one of the fairs in the district at the time.

== Infrastructure ==
As of 2011, Dhirpura had 5 primary schools and 1 veterinary hospital but no healthcare facilities for humans. Drinking water was provided by hand pump and tube well/borehole; there were no public toilets. The village had a sub post office and public library, as well as at least some access to electricity for all purposes. Streets were made of both kachcha and pakka materials.
