= Sangam Express =

Train in India

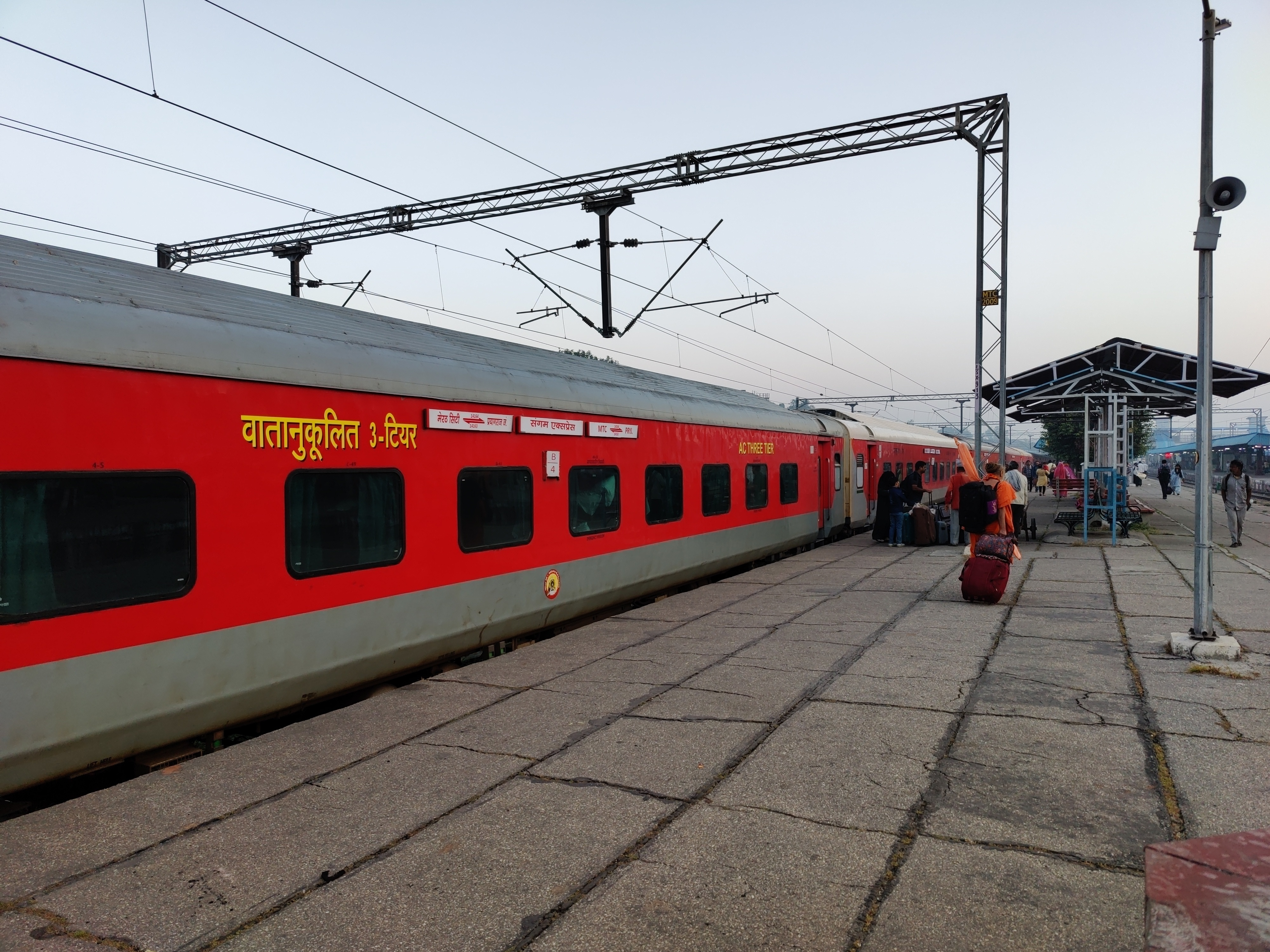
- Sangam Express standing at Meerut City.

Overview
- Service type: Express
- First service: 1 May 1976; 49 years ago
- Current operator(s): North Central Railway

Route
- Termini: Subedarganj (SFG); Meerut City (MTC)
- Stops: 21
- Distance travelled: 637 km (396 mi)
- Average journey time: 12 hours 35 minutes
- Service frequency: Daily
- Train number(s): 14163 / 14164

On-board services
- Class(es): Ac First Class, Ac 2 Tier, AC 3 Tier, Sleeper Class, General Unreserved
- Seating arrangements: Yes
- Sleeping arrangements: Yes
- Catering facilities: On-board catering, E-catering
- Observation facilities: Large windows
- Baggage facilities: Available
- Other facilities: Below the seats

Technical
- Rolling stock: LHB coach
- Track gauge: 1,676 mm (5 ft 6 in)
- Operating speed: 51 km/h (32 mph) average including halts.

The 14163 / 14164 Sangam Express is an express train belonging to Indian Railways – North Central Railway zone that runs between Subedarganj and Meerut City in India.

It operates as train number 14163 from Subedarganj to Meerut City and as train number 14164 in the reverse direction, serving the state of Uttar Pradesh.

== Coaches ==
The 14163 / 14164 Sangam Express has one AC 2 tier, one AC 3 tier, four Sleeper Class, four General Unreserved and one SLR (Seating cum Luggage Rake) coaches. It does not carry a pantry car.

As is customary with most train services in India, coach composition may be amended at the discretion of Indian Railways depending on demand.

== Service ==
The 14163 Sangam Express covers the distance of 637 kilometres in 12 hours 35 minutes (51 km/h) and in 12 hours 35 minutes as 14164 Sangam Express (51 km/h).

As the average speed of the train is below 55 km/h (34 mph), as per Indian Railways rules, its fare does not include a superfast surcharge.

== Routeing ==
The 14163 / 14164 Sangam Express runs from Subedarganj via Bamrauli, Manauri, Kanpur Central, Etawah, Tundla Junction, Aligarh Junction, Khurja Junction, Bulandshahr to Meerut City.

== Traction ==
It is now hauled by a Kanpur Loco Shed-based WAP-7 electric locomotive on its entire journey.

== Timings ==
14163 Sangam Express leaves Prayagraj Junction on a daily basis at 17:45 hrs IST and reaches Meerut City at 06:40 hrs IST the next day.

14164 Sangam Express leaves Meerut City on a daily basis at 19:00 hrs IST and reaches Prayagraj Junction at 08:10 hrs IST the next day.
