= Vijaypur Jammu railway station =

Railway station in Jammu and Kashmir, India

General information
- Location: Vijaypur, Samba district, Jammu and Kashmir; India
- Coordinates: 32.5720°N 75.0214°E
- Elevation: 108 metres (354 ft)
- System: Indian Railways station
- Owner: Indian Railways
- Platforms: 2
- Tracks: 4 (double electrified BG)
- Connections: Auto stand

Construction
- Structure type: Standard (on-ground station)
- Parking: No
- Cycle facilities: No

Other information
- Status: Functioning
- Station code: VJPJ
- Zone(s): Northern Railway
- Division(s): Firozpur
Location

Vijaypur Jammu railway station is a small railway station in Samba district, Jammu and Kashmir. Its code is VJPJ. It serves Vijaypur city. The station consists of two platforms. The platform is not well sheltered. It lacks many facilities including water and sanitation.

== Major trains ==
- Jhelum Express
- Kolkata–Jammu Tawi Express
- Pathankot–Jammu Tawi DEMU Special
- Jammu Mail
- Pathankot Jn–Udhampur DMU
- Tatanagar–Jammu Tawi Express
- Jammu Tawi–Bathinda Express
- Ahmedabad–Jammu Tawi Express
