= Phaphund railway station =

Railway station in Uttar Pradesh

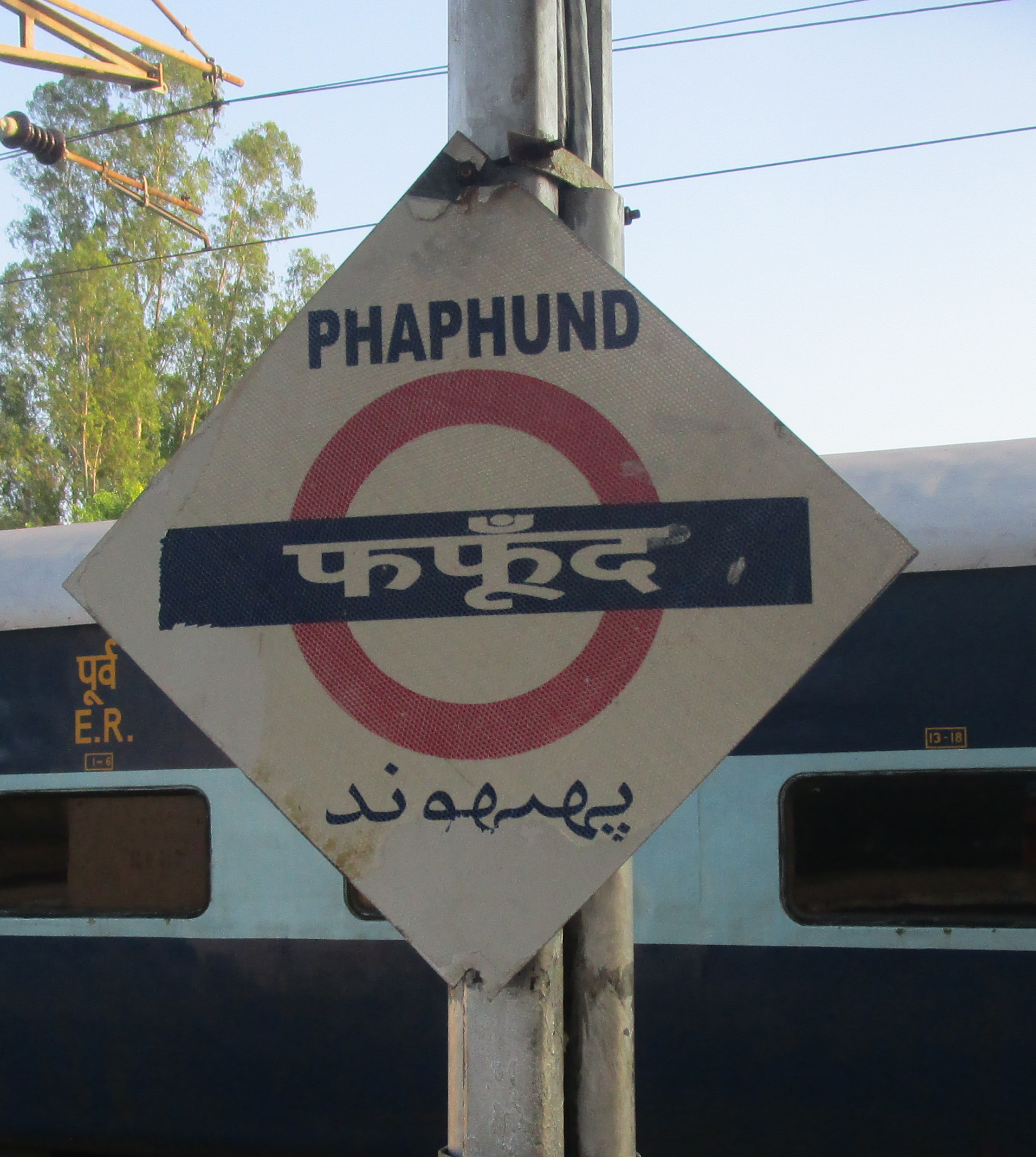
- Phaphund (Dibiyapur) railway station

General information
- Location: Near Baba Paramhansh Ashram, Railway ground, Station Road, Dibiyapur, Uttar Pradesh; India
- Coordinates: 26.6324°N 79.5544°E
- Elevation: 145 metres (476 ft)
- System: Indian Railways station
- Owner: Indian Railways
- Operator: North Central Railway zone
- Lines: Kanpur–Delhi section of Howrah–Delhi main line and Howrah–Gaya–Delhi line
- Platforms: 4
- Tracks: 5 (double electrified BG)
- Connections: Auto and Bus stand

Construction
- Structure type: At grade
- Parking: Yes
- Cycle facilities: Yes

Other information
- Status: Functioning
- Station code: PHD
- Zone(s): North Central Railway zone
- Division(s): Prayagraj

History
- Opened: 1886; 140 years ago
- Electrified: 1961–63

Services
| Preceding station | Indian Railways | Following station |
|---|---|---|
| Kanchausi towards ? | Northern Railway zone Kanpur–Delhi section | Pata towards ? |
- Computerized Ticketing Counters Parking Food Plaza Public Transportation
Location
- Location within Uttar Pradesh

Phaphund railway station (proposed to be renamed as Dibiyapur railway station) is an "A" graded railway station in Auraiya district, Uttar Pradesh, India. Its code is PHD. It serves Auraiya district and Dibiyapur city. It is located on the Kanpur–Delhi section of Howrah–Delhi main line and Howrah–Gaya–Delhi line. It is one of the main serving railway stations on the Kanpur–Delhi section of the Prayagraj railway division. Built during British rule, the station is owned by Indian Railways and operated by North Central Railway and consists of five tracks and four platforms.

== Location ==
Phaphund railway station is located on Kanpur–Phaphund–Tundla sub-section of the Kanpur–Delhi section of Howrah–Delhi main line and Howrah–Gaya–Delhi line. It is located 83 kilometers (52 mi) from the Kanpur Central railway station and 148 kilometers (92 mi) from Tundla Junction railway station.

== History ==
The East Indian Railway Company initiated efforts to develop a railway line from Howrah to Delhi in the mid-nineteenth century. Even when the line to Mughalsarai was being constructed and only the lines near Howrah were put in operation, the first train ran from Allahabad to Kanpur in 1859 and the Kanpur–Etawah section was opened to traffic in the 1860s. For the first through train from Howrah to Delhi in 1864, coaches were ferried on boats across the Yamuna at Allahabad. With the completion of the Old Naini Bridge across the Yamuna, through trains started running in 1865–66.

== Connectivity ==
It provides connectivity to the cities of Kota, Agra, Lucknow, Aligarh, Prayagraj, Varanasi, Kolkata, Guwahati, Patna, New Delhi and more.

== Electrification ==
The Kanpur–Panki sector was electrified in 1968–69, Panki–Tundla in 1971–72.

== Facilities ==
The platforms are well sheltered. The station is well connected by auto and bus stands. It provides free Wi-Fi in the station campus, parking and bicycle facilities. Smart card based booking machines are also installed in the station campus. A booking office also sits beside the railway overbridge. Modern cleaning machines are also operating in the campus thrice a day to maintain cleanliness standards in the station campus. Closed-circuit television cameras have been installed and are operating soundly in the station campus.

Recently coach indicator display boards have been installed on Platforms 2 and 3. Also new train display boards have been installed throughout railway station.

== Infrastructure ==
The station consists of four platforms and five tracks. A new railway overbridge has been built. This new overbridge has been made more favourable by providing and iron ceiling to facilitate shelter in the rainy and humid season. CCTV cameras have been also installed in the campus recently for better security of passengers.

Platforms have coach indicator display system for facilitating passengers along with train display boards throughout.

== Construction ==
Two waiting halls on the platforms 1, 2, 3, and 4 are under construction. (Expected:the end of April 2022), they will be constructed to provide passengers with more comfort. The increment in length of platforms is under construction. The Eastern Dedicated Freight Corridor has been constructed which will facilitate movement of goods train.

- Creation of more friendly and secure environment for passengers is under construction.

== Dedicated freight corridor ==
The Eastern Dedicated Freight Corridor has been constructed which will facilitate movement of goods train. Under construction two more railway lines have been constructed towards Platform 4 end side which facilitates goods train.

== Local movements and criticism ==
Several movements have been repeatedly launched by the local civilians of Dibiyapur to rename the station Dibiyapur as it is situated in the heart of city instead of Phaphund which is 9 km from Dibiyapur. People reasoned their demand by presenting that passengers most often get confused with the current name while booking train tickets. Also current name harms the identity of Dibiyapur.They repeatedly launched their movement on social media by the handle "Dibiyapur-Hamara swabhiman" recently.

Moreover, many a times the station suffered a criticism for not having efficient management for train halting on Platform 3.

== Gallery ==
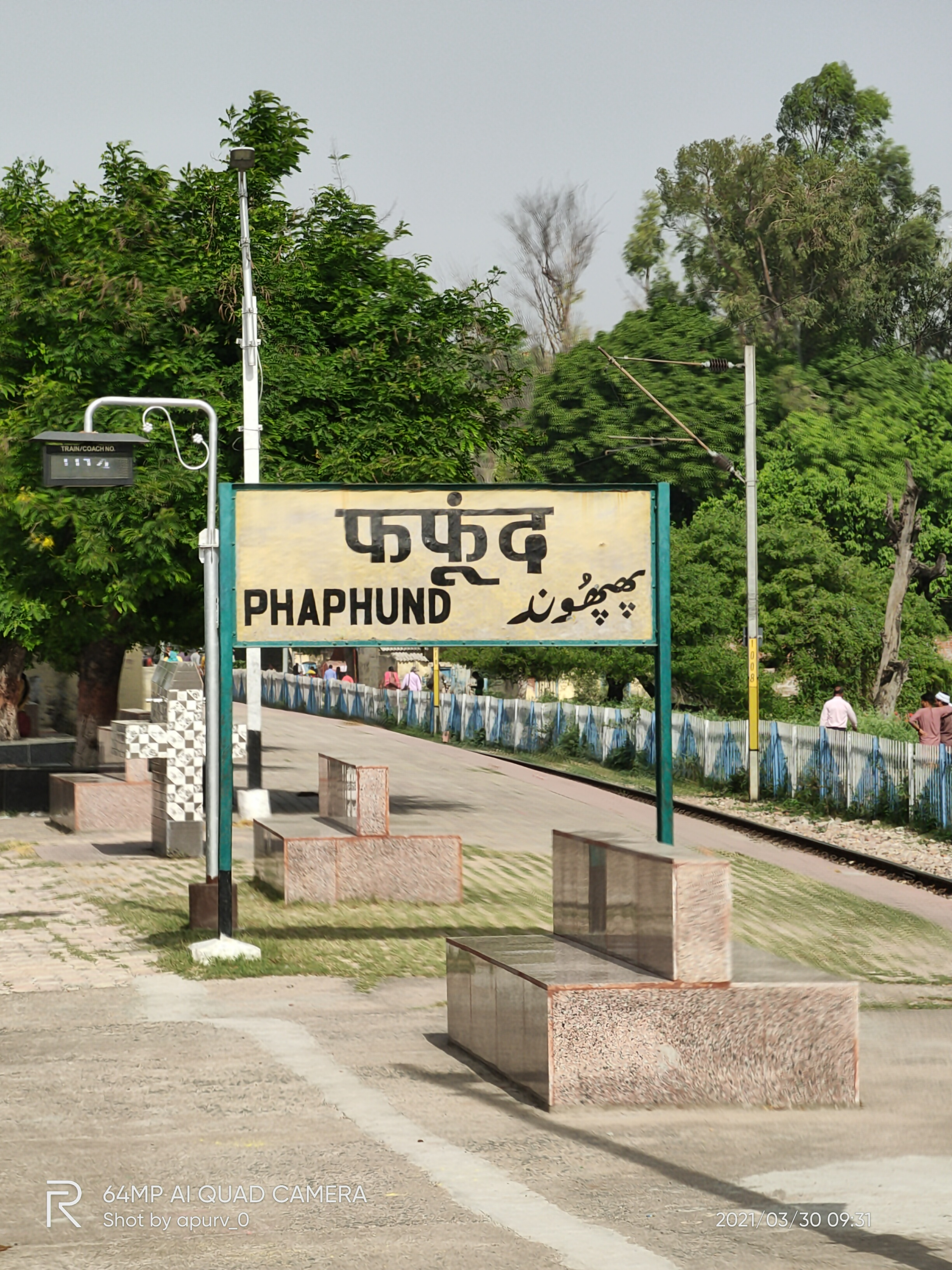
Sign board

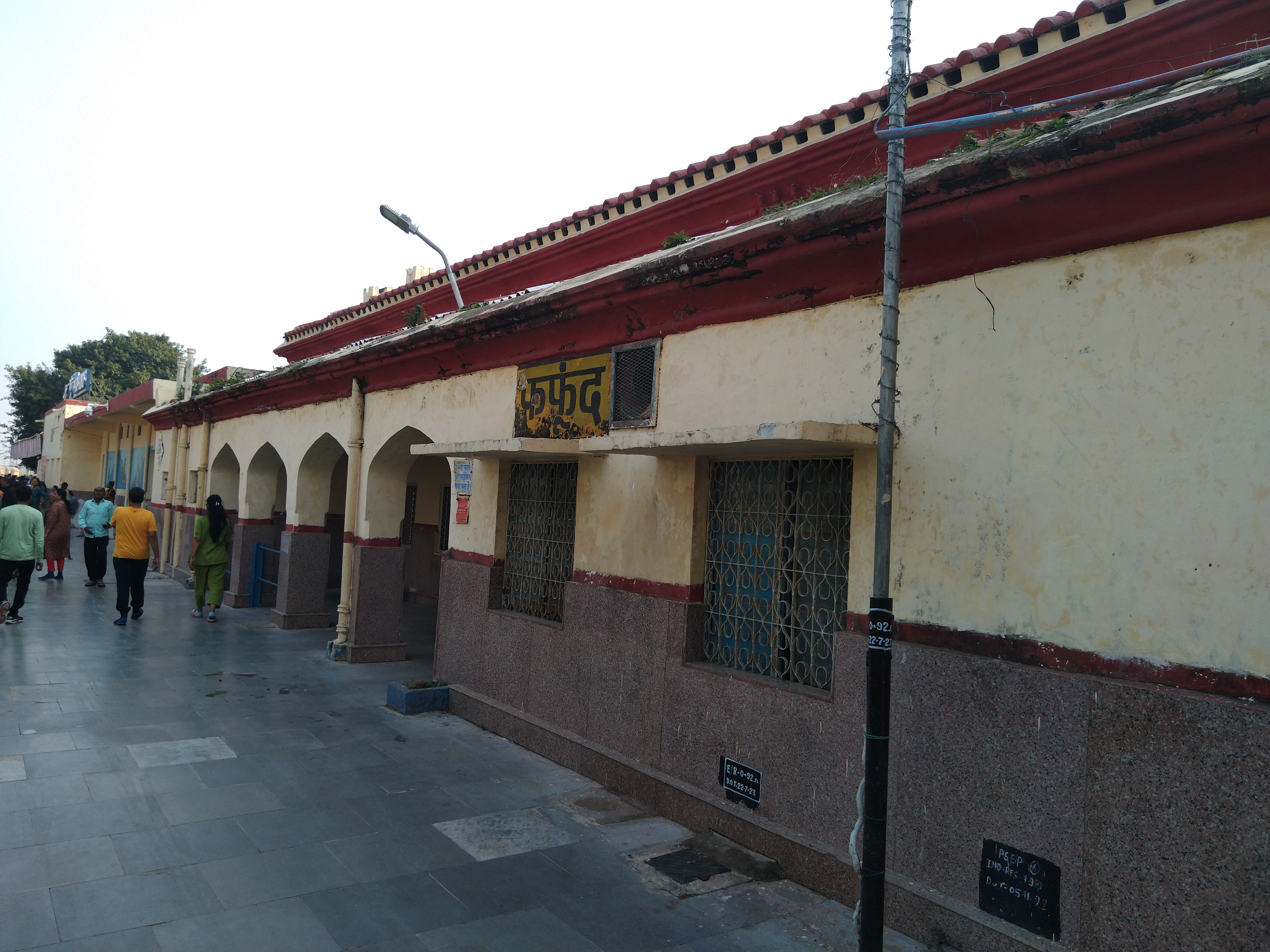
Old building of station

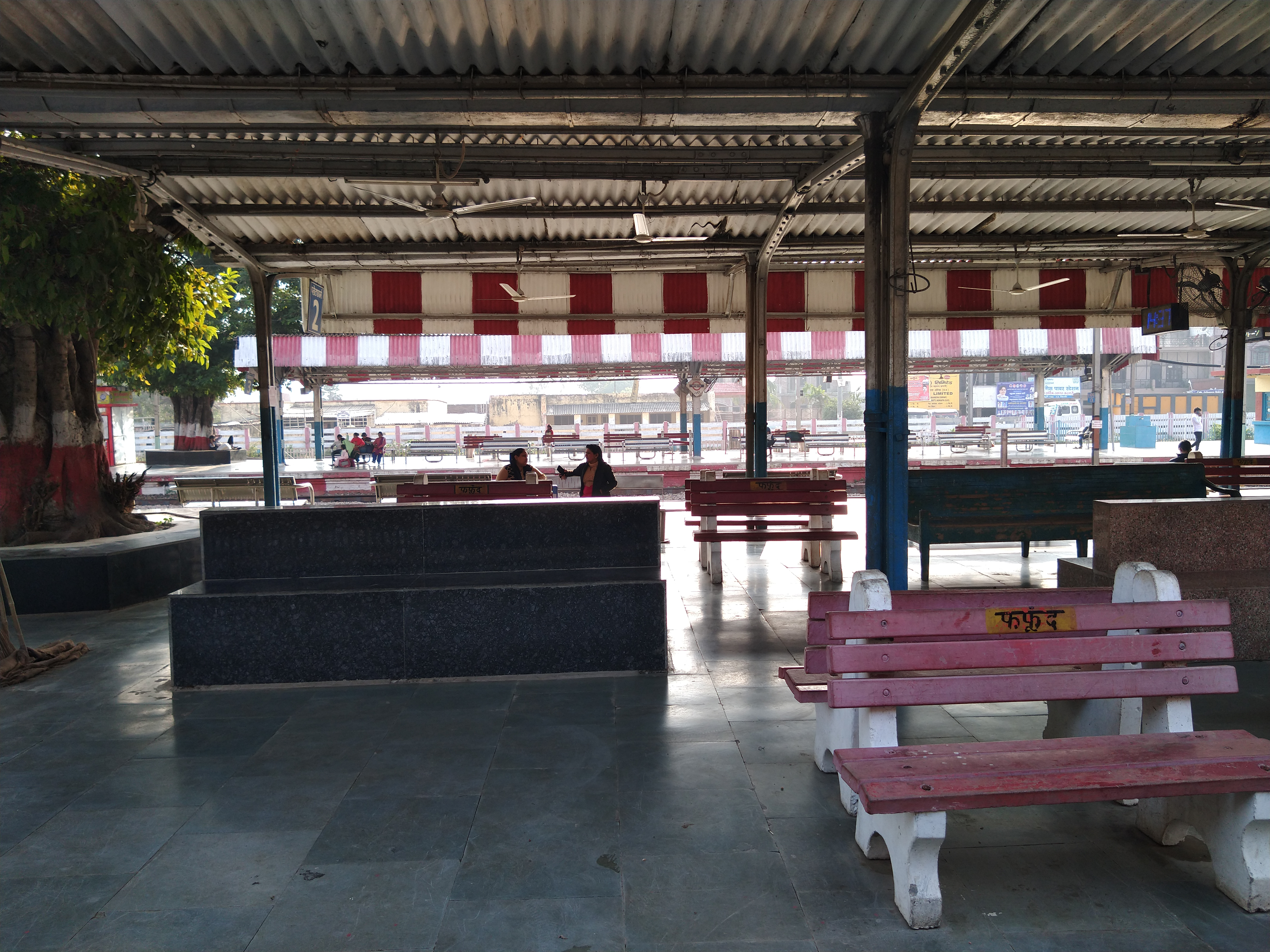
Platform

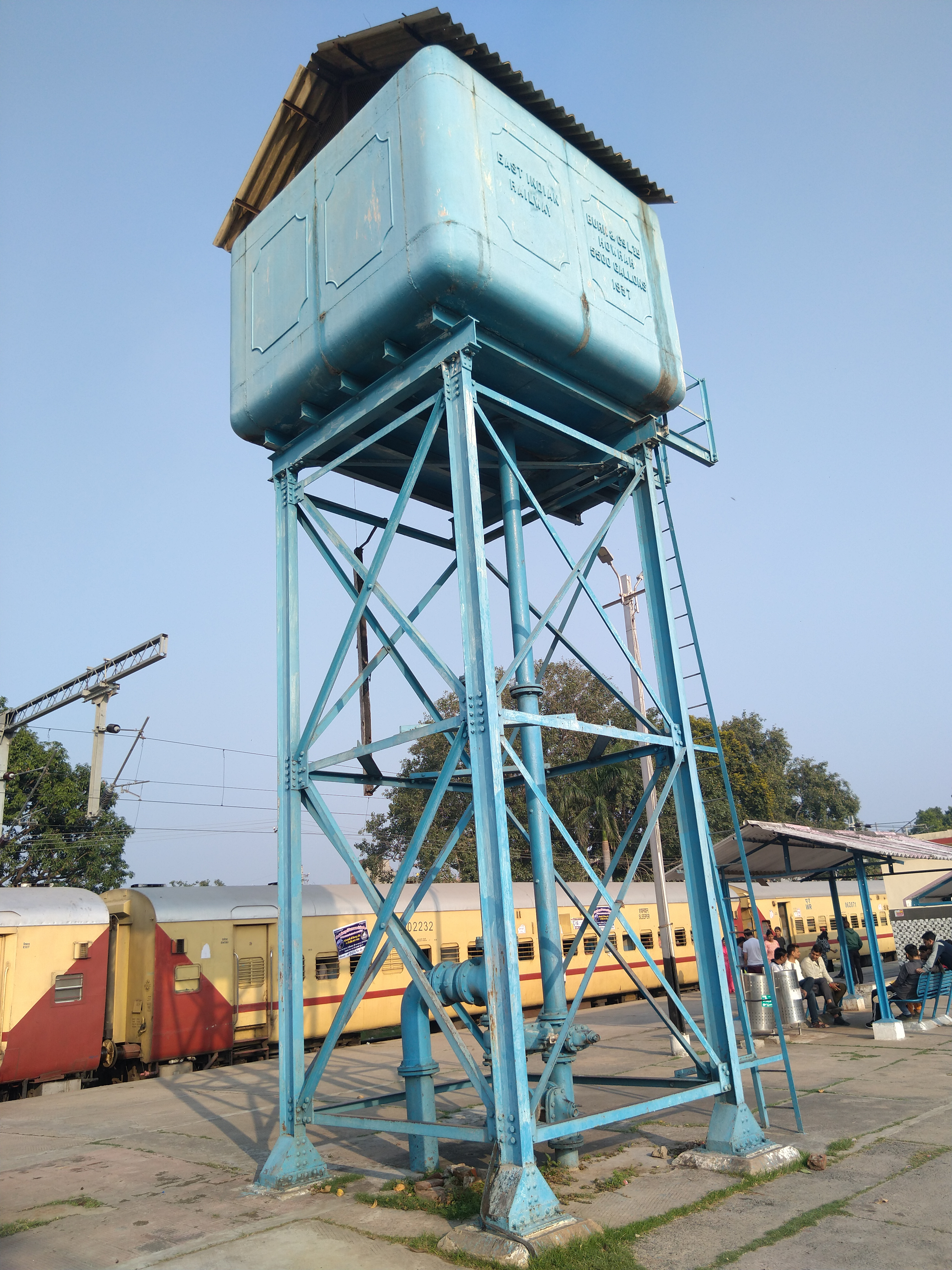
Water tank built by Burn & Co in 1937 for East Indian Railway at station
