= Subedarganj railway station =

Railway station in Uttar Pradesh, India

General information
- Location: Railway Colony, Subedarganj, Prayagraj, Uttar Pradesh; India
- Coordinates: 25°26′25″N 81°47′24″E
- Elevation: 99 m (325 ft)
- System: Indian Railways station
- Owner: Indian Railways
- Operator: North Central Railway
- Platforms: 6 BG
- Tracks: 7 BG
- Connections: Taxi stand, auto stand

Construction
- Structure type: Standard (on-ground station)
- Parking: Available
- Cycle facilities: Available
- Accessible: Disabled access

Other information
- Status: Active
- Station code: SFG
- Zone(s): North Central Railway
- Division(s): Prayagraj
Location
- Location within India Location within Uttar Pradesh
- Interactive map

Subedarganj railway station is an important railway station in Prayagraj district, Uttar Pradesh. Its code is SFG. It serves Prayagraj city. Railways has sanctioned a budget of ₹26 crore as part of its plan to develop the Subedarganj station, situated close to the North Central Railway headquarters in Prayagraj, as a full-fledged terminal, Minister of State, Manoj Sinha said. A new FOB will be completed by November. Prayagraj's neighbouring Subedarganj is being developed as terminal station with a provision of a new platform, new FOB, and extension of the existing platform.

== Electrification ==
The Cheoki–Subedarganj section was electrified in 1965–66.

== Trains ==
Some of the trains that runs from Subedarganj are:

- Subedarganj–Dehradun Express
- Subedarganj–Meerut City Sangam Express
- Subedarganj–Kanpur Central MEMU
- Subedarganj–Pt. Deen Dayal Upadhyaya Jn. MEMU
- Subedarganj–MCTM SF Express
- Subedarganj–Shri Mata Vaishno Devi Katra Jammu Mail

== See also ==
- Prayagraj Junction railway station
- Prayagraj Rambagh railway station
- Prayagraj Chheoki Junction railway station
- Prayag Junction railway station
