= Barhan, Agra =

Barhan
- Town
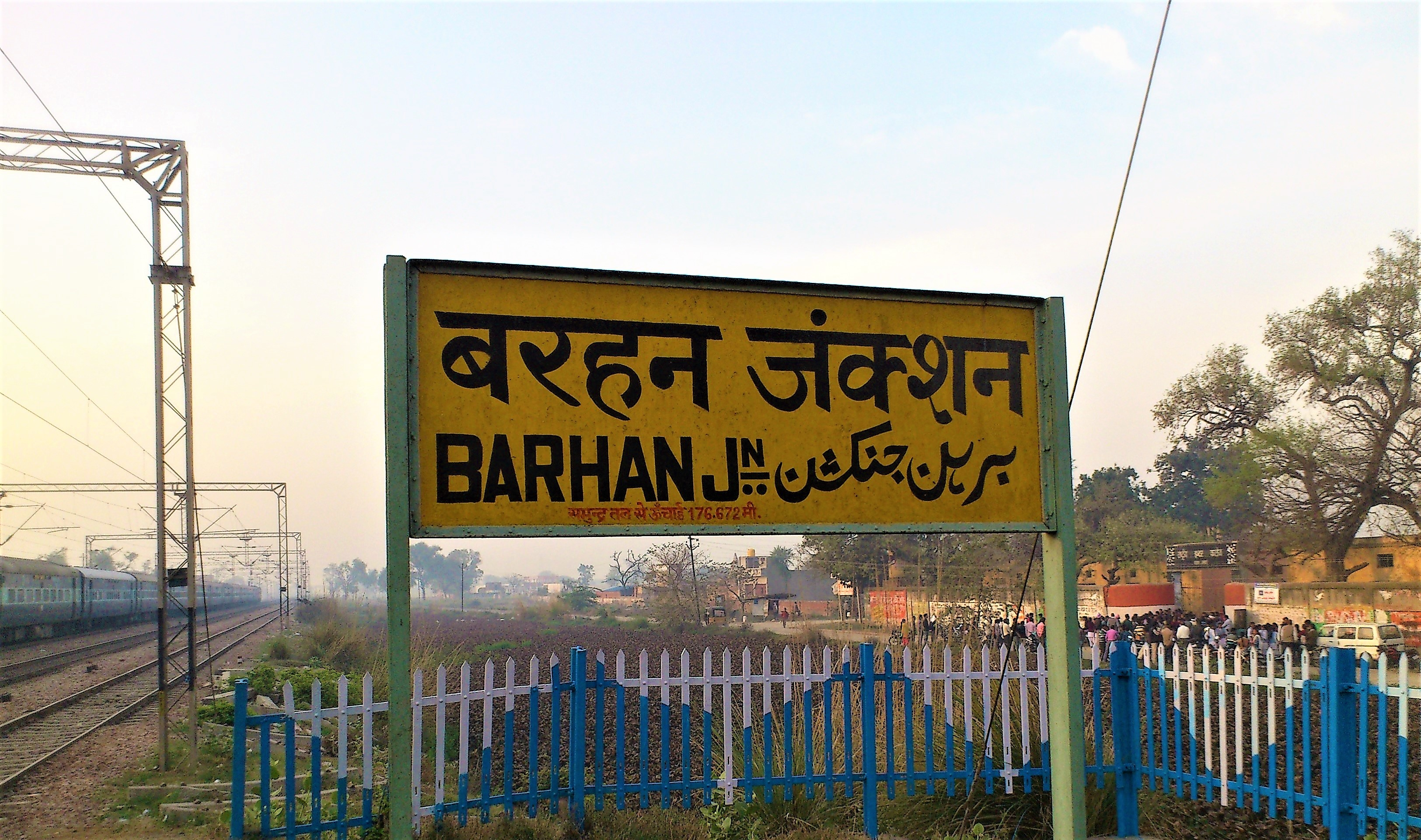
- Barhan

- Location within Uttar Pradesh Location within India
- Coordinates: 27.3299109°N 78.1896490°E
- Country: India
- State: Uttar Pradesh
- District: Agra

Government
  - Type: Gram Panchayat
  - Body: Gram Pradhan
- Elevation: 176.67 m (579.6 ft)

Population
  - Total: 17,365 (As per Census 2,011 record)
  - Rank: First in Tehsil (Etmadpur)
- Time zone: UTC+5:30 (IST)
- PIN: 283201
- Telephone code: 0562
- Vehicle registration: UP-80
- Website: agra.nic.in

Barhan is a town in Etmadpur tehsil, Agra district, Uttar Pradesh, India, located at 30 km from the city of Agra. It's primarily populated by Brahmins, Thakurs, Jain, Gautam, Baghel, Barbar, Kushwaha, Ahirs, Scheduled Castes and a few other communities.

== Population ==
Barhan's population is 17365. Out of this, 9322 are males while the females count 8043 here. This village has 2554 kids in the age group of 0–6 years. Out of this 1393 are boys and 1161 are girls.

== Education ==
There are many educational institutes in the Town.

The main colleges of Barhan is:

- Dev Education Degree College
- Rastriya Inter College
- Kishori Devi Kanya Inter College
- Sarswati Gyan Mandir High School
- Maa Bhagwati Public School
- R B Public School
- Mother Public School
- Adarsh vidhya niketan
- Dev public school

== Literacy rate ==
Literacy ratio in Barhan village is 66%. 11604 out of total 17365 population is literate here. In males the literacy ratio is 74% as 6971 males out of total 9322 are educated whereas female literacy ratio is 57% as 4633 out of total 8043 females are educated in this Village.

== Transport ==
=== Air ===
It is located just 28 km from Agra airport.

=== Road ===
Barhan is well connected with road transport. There are two ways to connect Agra city, first one via NH2 (Delhi to Kolkata ) at Etmadpur and second one is via Agra Jalesar Road at Anwalkheda.

=== Rail ===
Barhan Railway Station is on the North Central Railway zone line between Delhi and Howrah and Junction ( Etah Railway station line start from here)

Agra cant railway station and Agra fort railway station are about 30km from Barhan Railway Station

Tundla Junction railway station is 16 km from Barhan

== Worship Place ==
Barhan has worship places for all community such as jain, Hindus and Muslims

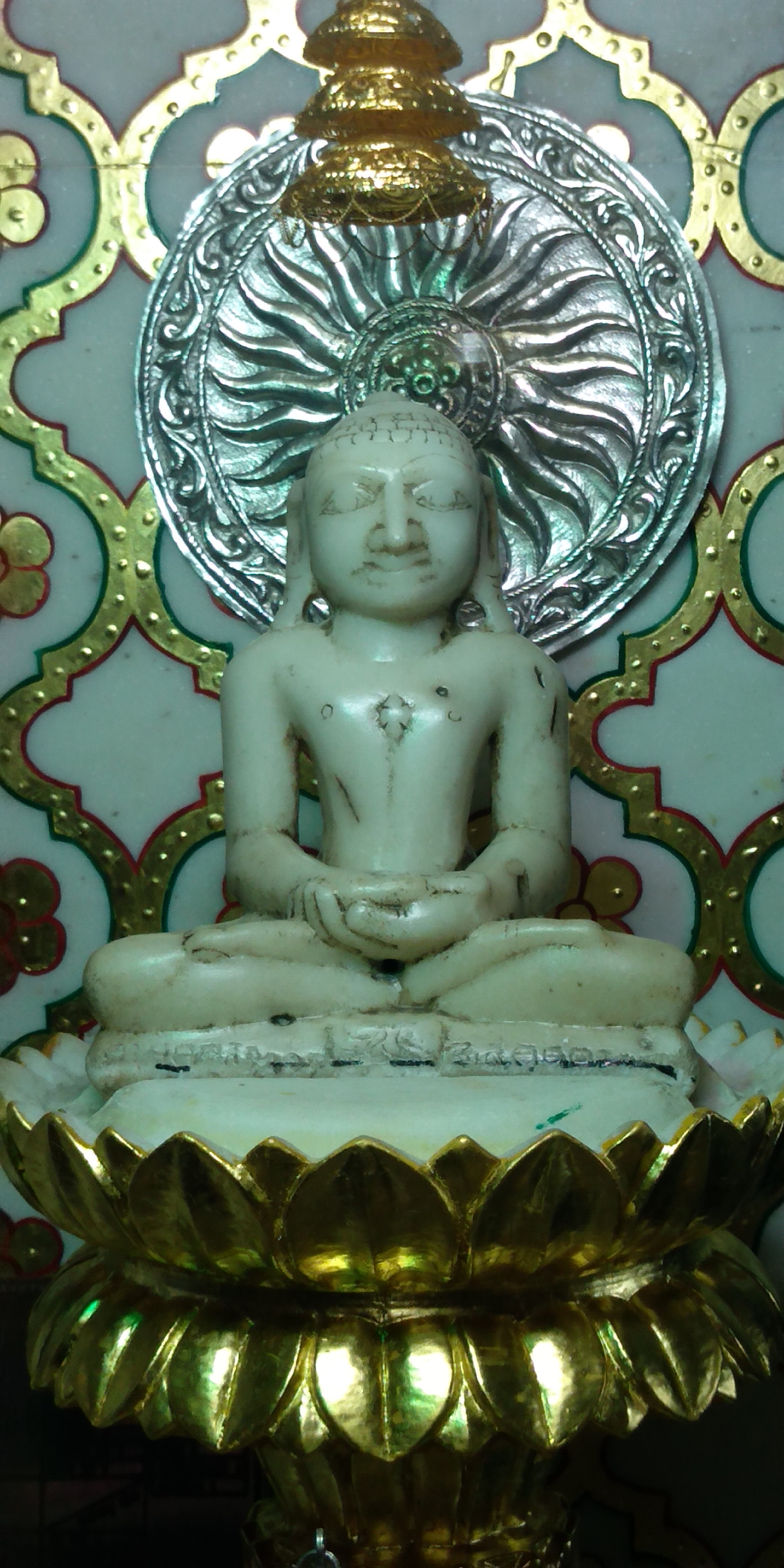
500 Year Old Statue of Bhagwan Adinath In Jain Temple Barhan

- Shri Bankey Bihari Mandir is a Hindu temple dedicated to Lord Krishna
- Shree Adinath Digambar Jain Mandir
- Shree Digambar Jain Parashnath Mandir
- Hanuman Mandir
- Devi Mata madir
- Jama majid

== Police Station ==
Barhan has its own Police station

- Police station Near moon light market opp. Ram leela ground Barhan Agra

== Fire Station ==
Barhan has its own Fire Station

- Fire Station Near tyagi market Barhan Agra

== Post Station ==
Barhan has its own Post Office

- Sub Post Office Moon Light Market Barhan Agra
