= Agra railway division =

Railway division of India

Agra Railway Division

Overview
- Owner: North Central Railway zone
- Locale: Agra, Uttar Pradesh, India

Service
- Type: Railway division
- System: Indian Railways

History
- Opened: 1 April 2003

Agra railway division is one of the three railway divisions under the jurisdiction of North Central Railway zone of the Indian Railways. This railway division was formed on 1 April 2003 and its headquarter is located at Agra in the state of Uttar Pradesh of India.

Prayagraj railway division and Jhansi railway division are the other two railway divisions under NCR Zone headquartered at Prayagraj.

Gatimaan Express, which is the fastest train in India also run across the Agra division. Vande Bharat also has stoppages at Mathura and Agra Cantt railway station of North Central Railway.

== List of railway stations under Amrit Bharat Station Scheme ==
1. Agra Fort Railway Station
2. Raja Ki Mandi Railway Station
3. Kosi kalan Railway Station
4. Idgah Railway Station
5. Dholpur Railway Station
6. Acchnera Railway Station
7. Kherli Railway Station
8. Mandawar Nahwa Road Railway Station
9. Hodal Railway Station
10. Bhuteshwar Railway Station
11. Govardhan Railway Station
12. Deeg Railway Station
13. Fatehpur Sikri Railway Station
14. Govind Garh Railway Station
15. Fatehabad Railway Station
16. Yamuna Bridge Railway Station
17. Chalesar Railway Station
18. Kuberpur Railway Station
19. Etmadpur Railway Station
20. Barhan Junction Railway Station
21. Jalesar City Railway Station
22. Awagarh Railway Station
23. Etah Railway Station

== List of railway stations and towns ==
The list includes the stations under the Agra railway division and their station category.

Category of station	No. of stations	Names of stations
A-1 Category	2	Mathura Junction , Agra Cantonment
A Category	3	Agra Fort, Raja ki Mandi , Mathura Cantt
B Category	-	-
C Category (Suburban station)	-	Etah Railway Station
D Category	-	
E Category	-	GovindGarh, Goverdhan, Etamadpur, Barhan, Jalesar, Awagarh,
F Category; Halt Station	-	-
Total	-	-

== See also ==
- Express trains in India
- Bhopal Shatabdi
- Agra
- North Central Railway
