= State Highway 21 (Uttar Pradesh) =

Highway in Uttar Pradesh, India

State Highway 21

Route information
- Length: 385 km (239 mi)

Location
- Country: India
- States: Uttar Pradesh: 8,432 km (5,239 mi)
- Primary destinations: Bilaraya, Lakhimpur - Sitapur - Panwari

Highway system
- Roads in India; Expressways; National; State; Asian

Uttar Pradesh State Highway 21 (UP SH 21) passes through Bilaraya - Lakhimpur - Sitapur - Panwari and covers a distance of 385.46 km.

Uttar Pradesh state in India has a series of road networks. There are 35 national highways with total length of 4635 km and 83 state highways with total length of 8,432 km (5,239 mi).

== See also ==
- State highway
- State Highway (India)
- Lakhimpur Kheri district
- Dudhwa National Park
