= New Delhi–Kanpur section =

Railway line in India

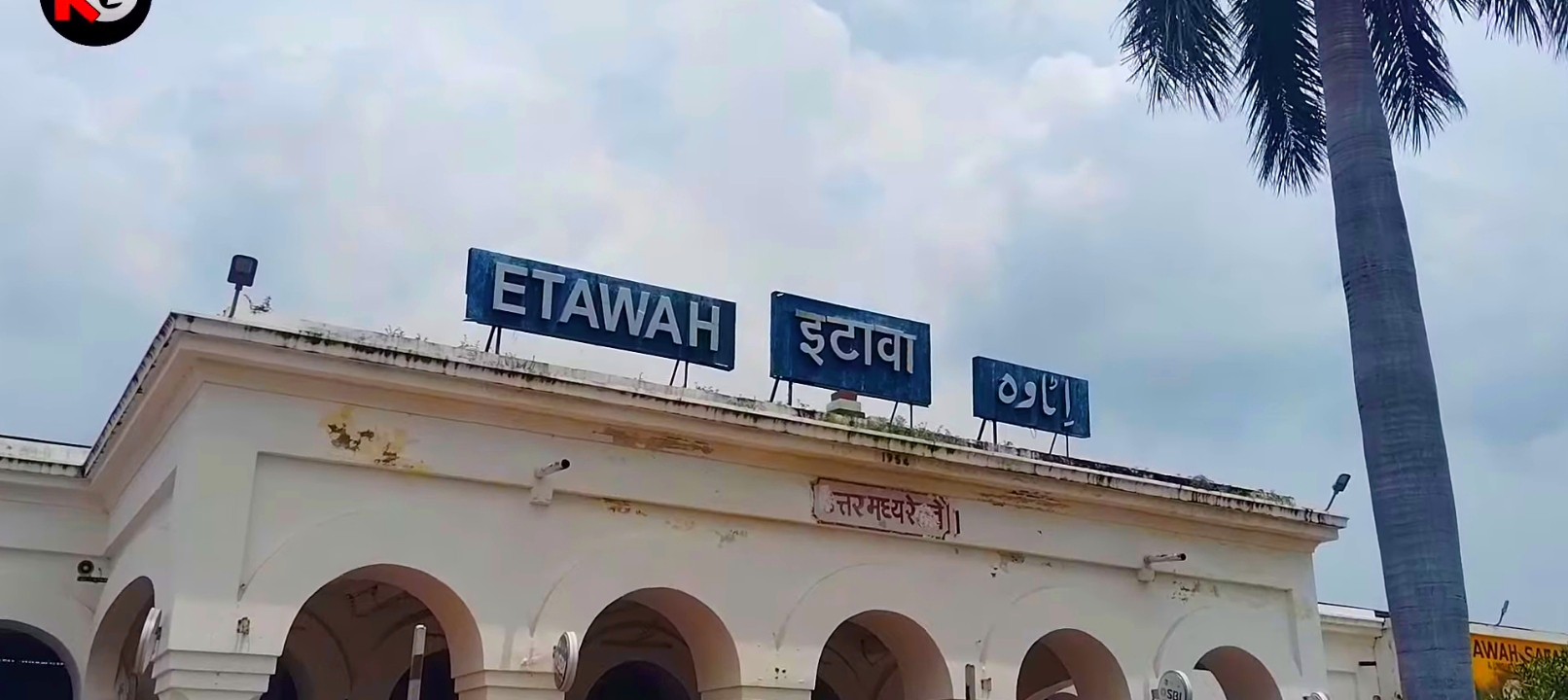
- Etawah Junction railway station is an important Railway Station on New Delhi - Kanpur Section

Overview
- Status: Operational
- Owner: Indian Railways
- Termini: New Delhi; Kanpur Central

Service
- Operator(s): North Central Railway and Northern Railway
- Depot: Kanpur
- Rolling stock: WAP-5, WAP-7 and WAG-9

History
- Opened: 1866

Technical
- Line length: 441 km
- Track length: 441 Km
- Track gauge: 1,676 mm (5 ft 6 in) broad gauge
- Electrification: 25 kV 50 Hz AC OHLE
- Operating speed: Main line: up to 160 km/h

The Kanpur–Delhi section is a railway line connecting Kanpur Central and Delhi. This section includes Agra Chord and Etah link. The main line is part of Howrah–Delhi main line and Howrah–Gaya–Delhi line. The Agra–Delhi chord is part of Delhi–Mumbai line and Delhi–Chennai line.

== History ==
The East Indian Railway Company initiated efforts to develop a railway line from Howrah to Delhi in the mid nineteenth century. Even when the line to Mughalsarai was being constructed and only the lines near Howrah were put in operation, the first train ran from Allahabad to Kanpur in 1859 and the Kanpur–Etawah section was opened to traffic in the 1860s. For the first through train from Howrah to Delhi in 1864, coaches were ferried on boats across the Yamuna at Allahabad. With the completion of the Old Naini Bridge across the Yamuna through trains started running in 1865–66.

The 1,000 mm (3 ft 3 3/8 in)-wide metre-gauge Delhi–Bandikui and Bandikui–Agra lines of Rajputana State Railway were opened in 1874. The lines were converted to broad gauge in early 2000s.

The Hathras Road–Mathura Cantt broad-gauge line was opened in 1875 and the Agra–Gwalior broad-gauge line was opened in 1881.

The broad-gauge Agra–Delhi chord was opened in 1904. Some parts of it were relaid during the construction of New Delhi (inaugurated in 1927–28).

The 61.80 km (38 mi) long 5 ft 6 in (1,676 mm) broad gauge Barhan–Etah line was constructed in 1959.

The 54.3 km (34 mi) long 5 ft 6 in (1,676 mm) broad gauge Ghaziabad–Tughlakabad line, including bridge across Yamuna, was completed in 1966.

== Electrification ==
The Kanpur–Panki section was electrified in 1968–69, Panki–Tundla in 1971–72, Tundla–Hathras-Aligarh–Ghaziabad in 1975–76, Ghaziabad–Nizamuddin–New Delhi–Delhi in 1976–77, Tilak Bridge-Fairdabad in 1982–83, Raja ki Mandi-Agra–Dhoulpur in 1984–85, Tundla–Yamuna Bridge in 1998–99 and Yamuna Bridge-Agra in 1990–91.

== Loco sheds ==
Kanpur Central electric loco shed accommodates WAP-4 and WAG-7 electric locos. Agra diesel loco shed houses WDS-4 locomotives. The shed serves the requirement of shunting locos at different stations and Jhansi Workshop. Ghaziabad electric loco shed serves the Delhi area. It housed 47 WAP-1 locos in 2008. It also has WAM-4, WAP-4, WAP-5, WAP-7 and WAG-5HA locos.

== Speed limits ==
The entire Howrah–Delhi line, via Howrah–Bardhaman chord and Grand Chord is classified as a "Group A" line which can take speeds up to 160 km/h (99 mph).

== Passenger movement ==
Kanpur Central and Delhi on the main line, and Agra Cantonment and Mathura Junction on the Agra–Delhi chord are amongst the top hundred booking stations of Indian Railway.

== Major railway stations ==
Some of the important railway stations that lie in this section are-

- New Delhi
- Ghaziabad Junction
- Bulandshahr Junction (Currently Chola Station)
- Aligarh Junction
- Tundla Junction
- Etawah Junction
- Kanpur Central
