= Tundla Junction railway station =

Railway station in Uttar Pradesh, India

Tundla Junction Railway Station
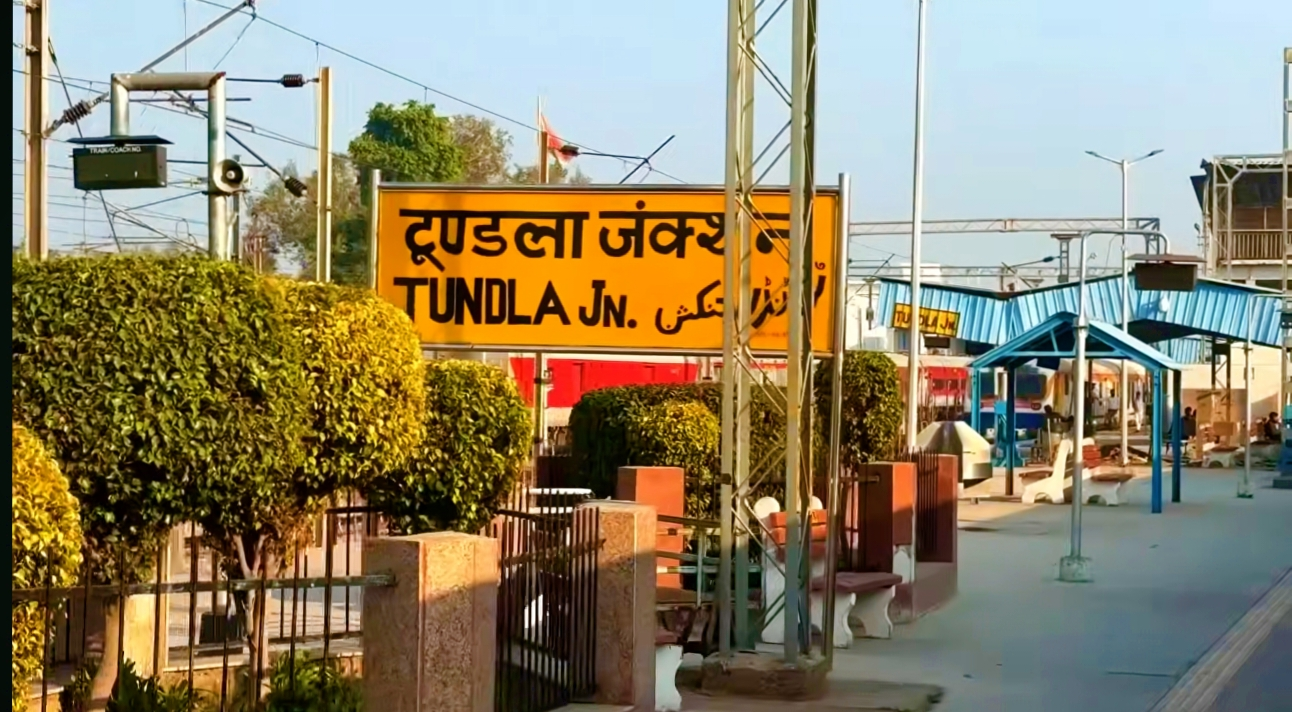

General information
- Location: Junction Point, Tundla, Uttar Pradesh; India
- Coordinates: 27°12′28″N 78°14′01″E
- Elevation: 166.878 metres (547.50 ft)
- System: Indian Railway Station
- Owner: Indian Railways
- Operator: North Central Railway
- Lines: New Delhi–Kanpur section, New Delhi–Howrah main line, Tundla-Agra line
- Platforms: 7

Construction
- Structure type: Standard on ground
- Parking: Yes
- Cycle facilities: yes

Other information
- Status: Functioning
- Station code: TDL
- Division(s): Prayagraj

History
- Opened: 1866
- Former names: East Indian Railway Company
Location
- Location within Uttar Pradesh Location within India

Tundla Junction is an important station in the North Central Railway zone, in Firozabad district, Uttar Pradesh. The station code is TDL.

It is located on the Delhi–Howrah main line 25 km from Agra City. Tundla is a technical halt for changing drivers and guards for almost all of the trains on the New Delhi–Pandit Deen Dayal Upadhyaya Nagar / Lucknow sections. The station was built by the British and remains essentially unchanged. The railway station is a site in itself and takes one back to the pre-independence era.

Tundla Junction is important for the people of Agra and for tourists providing connections to the east of the country, i.e. Kolkata, Guwahati, Patna etc., and especially to the northern state of Uttar Pradesh. It has connections to Agra Cantonment, Firozabad railway station, Badaun, Bareilly Junction, Etawah, Aligarh Junction, Phaphund, Kanpur Central railway station etc.

== History ==
- 1972: Electrification from Howrah reaches Tundla.
- 29 December 2002: Konkan Railway conducts a trial run of the Madgaon–Roha Express at 150 km/h (briefly touching 165 km/h at times) using a WDP-4 loco. In December, NR is said to have run trials with a WDP-4 hauling at train at up to 180 km/h on the Ghaziabad–Tundla section.
- 13–21 December 2003: Trials with weak field arrangement for MEMUs on the Tundla–Kanpur section of NCR. With a "dense crush load" and stopping at all stations, a 4-car MEMU rake could reduce its total running time by 7% with a maximum speed of 90 km/h and 10% with a maximum speed of 100 km/h on the 228 km section, because of the improved acceleration.
