= Lucknow–Agra Fort Intercity Express =

Train route in India

Overview
- Service type: Intercity Express
- Current operator: North Central Railway Zone

Route
- Termini: Agra Fort (AF); Lucknow Junction (LJN)
- Stops: 12
- Distance travelled: 331 km (206 mi)
- Average journey time: 6 hours
- Service frequency: Daily
- Train number: 12179/12180

On-board services
- Classes: Second Class sitting, AC chair, Unreserved
- Seating arrangements: Yes
- Sleeping arrangements: No
- Catering facilities: No
- Entertainment facilities: No

Technical
- Rolling stock: 2
- Track gauge: 1,676 mm (5 ft 6 in)
- Operating speed: 55 km/h (34 mph)
Route map
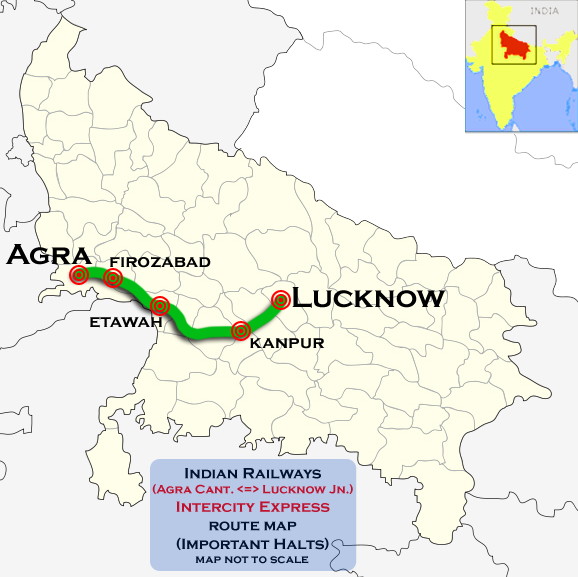

Lucknow–Agra Fort Intercity Express is an Intercity Express train of the Indian Railways connecting Agra Fort and Lucknow Junction in Uttar Pradesh. It is currently being operated with 12179/12180 train numbers on a daily basis.

It was running up to Agra Cantonment and thereafter the destination station changed to Agra Fort on 1 July 2019.

== Service speeds ==
- The 12179/Lucknow Jn.–Agra Fort Intercity Express has an average speed of 55 km/h and covers 326 km in 6 hours.
- The 12180/Agra Fort–Lucknow Jn. Intercity Express has an average speed of 55 km/h and covers 331 km in 5 hours, 55 mins.

== Route and halts ==
- Lucknow Junction
- Unnao Junction
- Kanpur Central
- Panki
- Rura
- Jhinjhak
- Phaphund
- Bharthana
- Etawah Junction
- Shikohabad Junction
- Firozabad
- Tundla Junction
- Agra Fort

== Coach composite ==
The train consists of 13 coaches :

- 2 AC III Chair Car
- 9 Second Class sitting
- 4 General
- 2 Second-class Luggage/parcel van

== Traction ==
Both trains are hauled by a Ghaziabad Loco Shed based WAP-7 or WAP-4 electric locomotive.

== See also ==
- Gatimaan Express
- Agra Cantt New Delhi Intercity Express
- Gomti Express
