= Unchahar Express =

Train in India

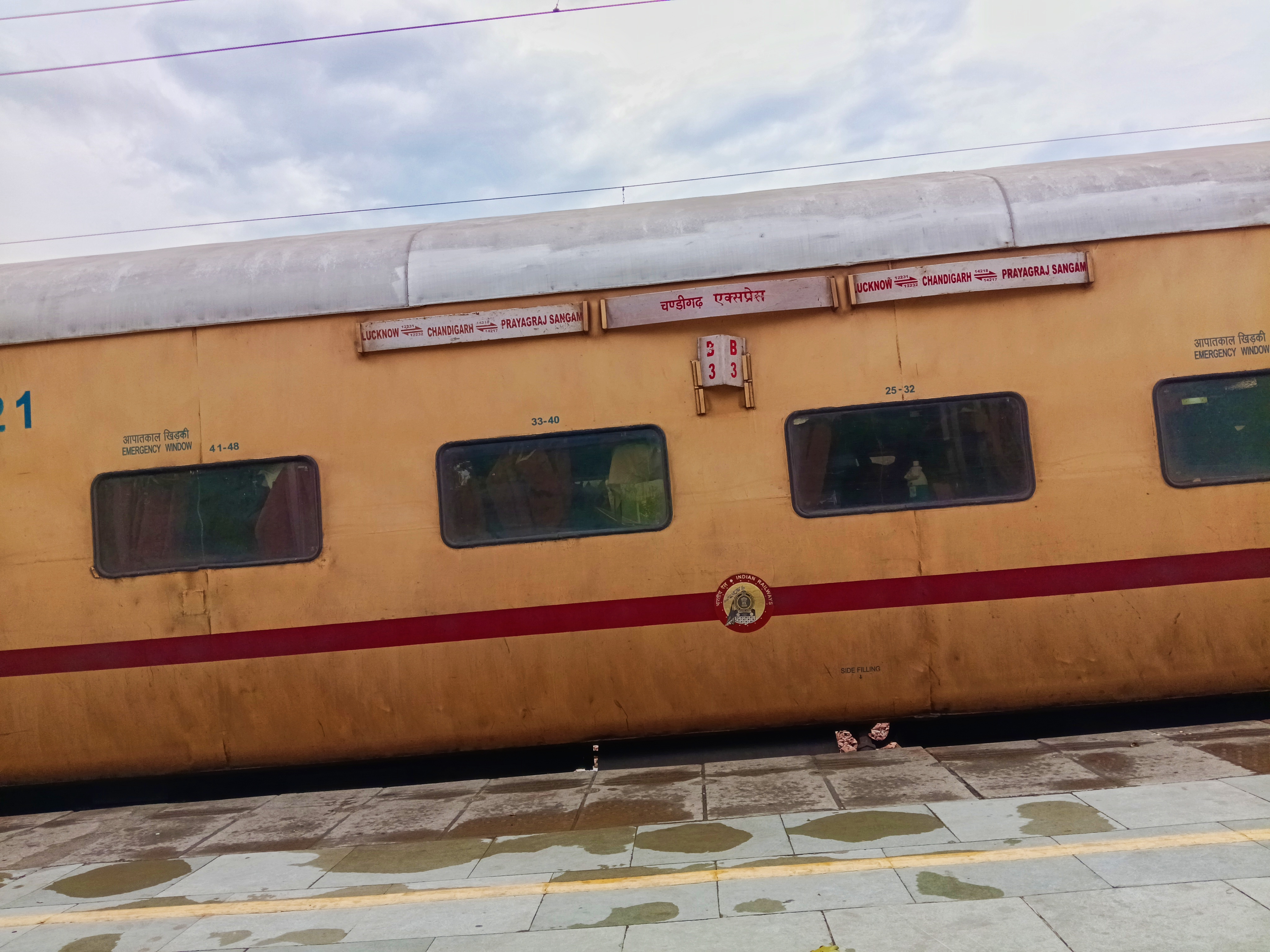

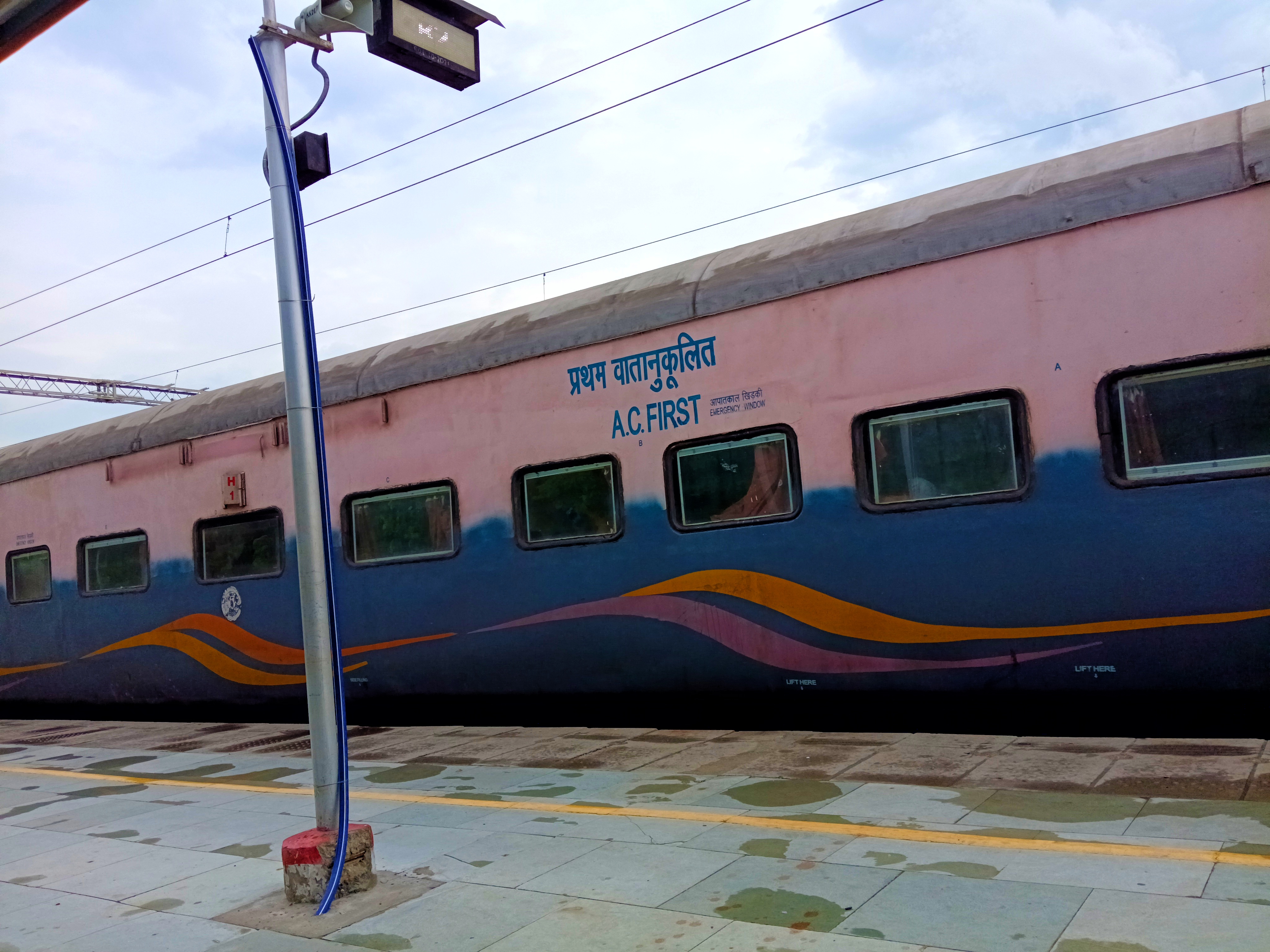
- Unchahar Express At Kurukshetra Junction railway station

Overview
- Service type: Express
- Locale: Uttar Pradesh, Delhi, Haryana & Chandigarh
- Current operator: Northern Railway

Route
- Termini: Prayagraj Sangam (PYGS); Chandigarh Junction (CDG)
- Stops: 39
- Distance travelled: 890 km (553 mi)
- Average journey time: 19 hours 20 minutes
- Service frequency: Daily
- Train number: 14217 / 14218

On-board services
- Classes: AC 2 Tier, AC 3 Tier, Sleeper Class, Second Class Seating, General Unreserved
- Seating arrangements: Yes
- Sleeping arrangements: Yes
- Catering facilities: E-catering
- Observation facilities: Rake sharing with 12231/12232 Lucknow–Chandigarh Express
- Baggage facilities: Available

Technical
- Rolling stock: LHB coach
- Track gauge: 1,676 mm (5 ft 6 in)
- Operating speed: 46 km/h (29 mph) average including halts.

The 14217 / 14218 Unchahar Express is an express train belonging to Indian Railways – Northern Railways zone that runs between Prayagraj sangam Junction and Chandigarh in India. First run on track on 1986.

It operates as train number 14217 from Prayag Junction to Chandigarh and as train number 14218 in the reverse direction. Earlier it used to start from Prayag Junction.

== Coaches ==
The 14217/18 Unchahar Express presently has 2 AC II Tier, 3 AC III Tier, 6 Sleeper Class, 6 Second Class Seating & 2 SLR (Seating cum Luggage Rake) LHB coaches.

As with most train services in India, coach composition may be amended at the discretion of Indian Railways depending on demand.

== Service ==
The 14217/18 Prayag–Chandigarh Unchahar Express covers the distance of 913 kilometers in 19 hours 20 mins as 14217 Prayag–Chandigarh Unchahar Express (47.22 km/h) and in 18 hrs 15 mins as 14218 Chandigarh–Prayag Unchahar Express (48.48 km/h).

As the average speed of the train is below 55 km/h, as per Indian Railways rules, its fare does not include a Superfast surcharge.

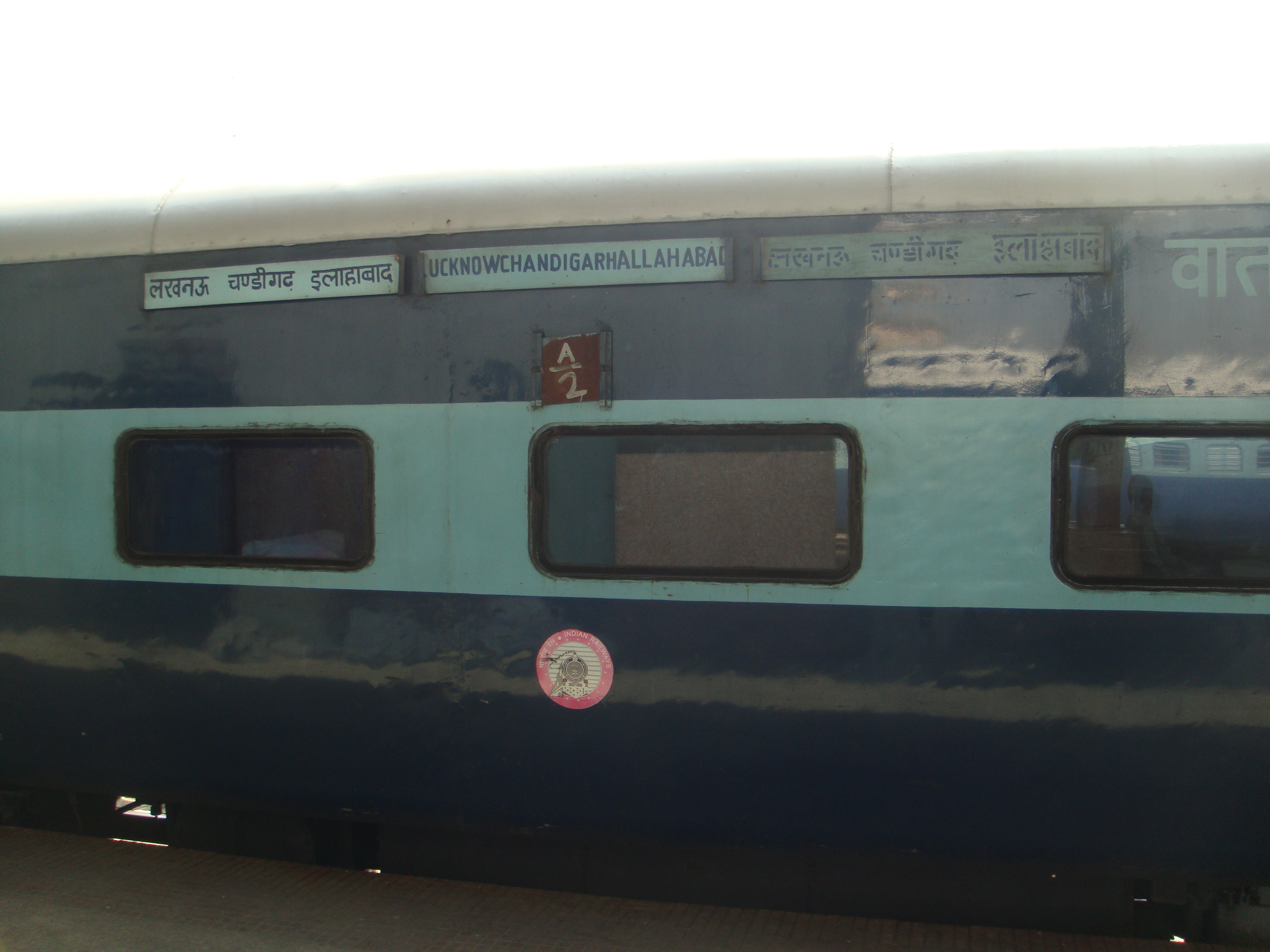
Unchahar Express – AC 2 tier coach

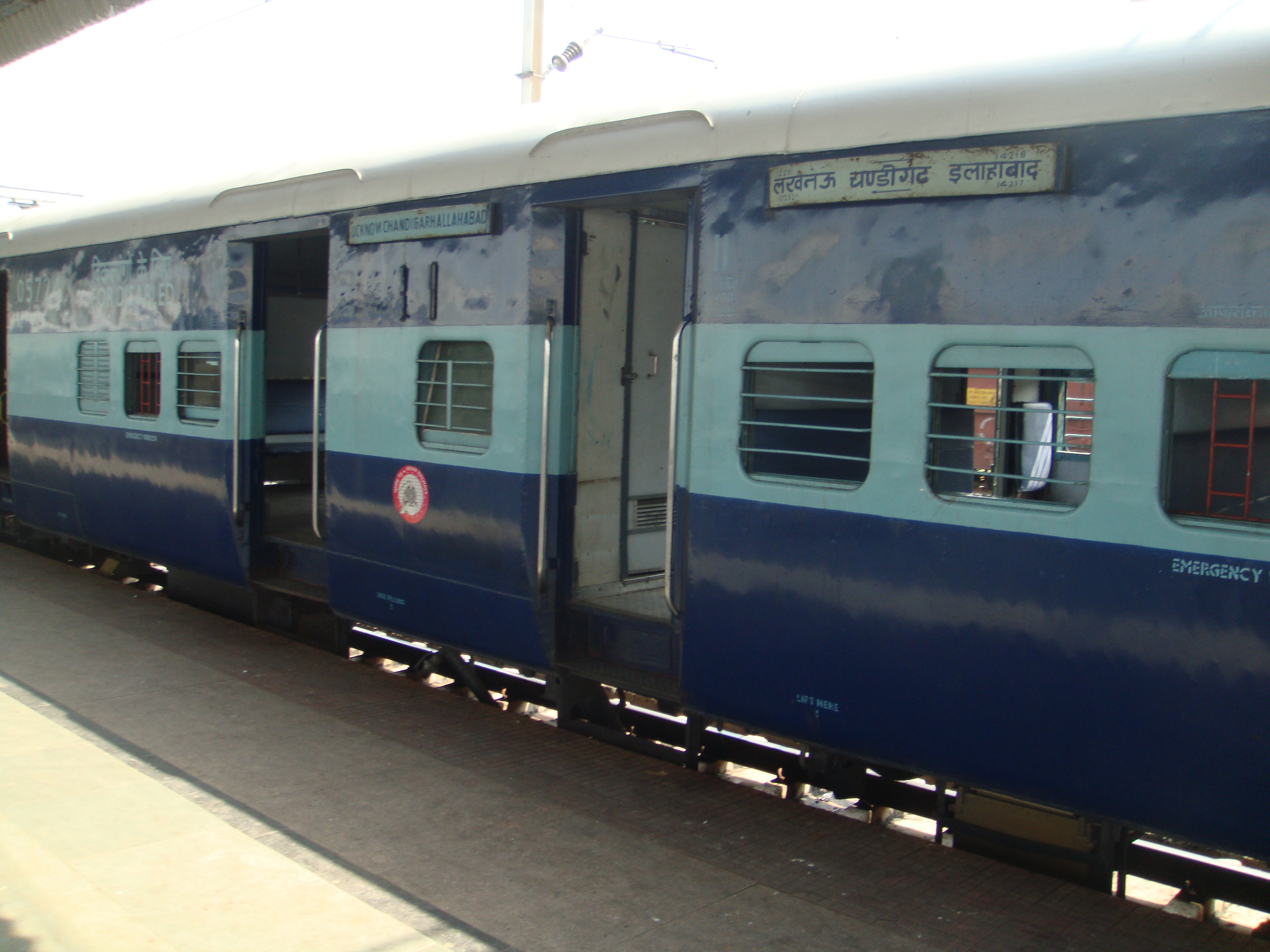
Unchahar Express – SLR coach

== Routeing ==
The 14217/14218 Unchahar Express runs from Prayag Junction via Kunda, Unchahar Junction, Unnao Junction, Kanpur Central, Jhinjhak,Phaphund, Etawah Junction, Shikohabad, Firozabad, Tundla, Aligarh, Ghaziabad, Old Delhi, Narela, Sonipat Junction, Panipat, Karnal, Kurukshetra, Ambala Cantonment to Chandigarh.

== Traction ==
A WAP-5 or WAP-7 electric locomotive from the Ghaziabad Loco Shed hauls the train from Prayagraj Sangam till Chandigarh Junction.
