= Lokmanya Tilak Terminus–Bareilly Weekly Express =

Overview
- Service type: Express
- First service: 15 January 1996
- Current operator: Northern Railway zone

Route
- Termini: Lokmanya Tilak Terminus (LTT); Bareilly Junction (BE)
- Stops: 25
- Distance travelled: 1,604 km (997 mi)
- Average journey time: 31h 35m
- Service frequency: Weekly (Note: Runs one day in a week for every direction.)
- Train number: 14313/14314

On-board services
- Classes: AC 2 tier, AC 3 tier, Sleeper class, General Unreserved
- Seating arrangements: No
- Sleeping arrangements: Yes
- Catering facilities: On-board catering E-catering
- Observation facilities: LHB coach
- Entertainment facilities: No
- Baggage facilities: No
- Other facilities: Below the seats

Technical
- Rolling stock: 2
- Track gauge: 1,676 mm (5 ft 6 in)
- Operating speed: 51 km/h (32 mph), including halts

The Lokmanya Tilak Terminus–Bareilly Weekly Express is an Express train belonging to Northern Railway zone that runs between Lokmanya Tilak Terminus and Bareilly Junction in India. It is currently being operated with 14313/14314 train numbers on a weekly basis. It is the first train to run between Mumbai and Bareilly. Inaugural run of this train was on 15 January 1996 between Dadar Railway station to Bareilly Junction, Mr Siraj Ansari was instrumental force behind starting this service .later originating station changed to Lokmanya Tilak Terminus ( Kurla )

== Service ==
The 14313/Mumbai LTT–Bareilly Weekly Express has an average speed of 51 km/h and covers 1604 km in 31h 35m. The 14314/Bareilly–Mumbai LTT Weekly Express Express has an average speed of 57 km/h and covers 1604 km in 28h 45m.

== Route and halts ==
The important halts of the train are:

- Lokmanya Tilak Terminus
- Kalyan Junction
- Kasara
- Igatpuri
- Nasik Road
- Manmad Junction
- Jalgaon
- Bhusaval Junction
- Burhanpur
- Khandwa Junction
- Harda
- Itarsi Junction
- Rani Kamalapati
- Bhopal Junction
- Bina Junction
- Virangana Lakshmibai Junction
- Gwalior Junction
- Morena
- Agra Cantonment
- Agra Fort
- Aligarh Junction
- Babrala
- Chandausi Junction
- Dabtara
- Aonla
- Bareilly Junction

== Coach composition ==
The train has LHB rakes with a maximum speed of 130 km/h. The train consists of 17 coaches:

- 1 AC II Tier
- 3 AC III Tier
- 7 Sleeper coaches
- 4 General
- 2 Generator cum Luggage Rake

== Traction ==
Both trains are hauled by an WAG-9 Izzatnagar electric locomotive or WAP-4 kalyan or WAP-7 Izzatnagar from Mumbai to Bareilly

Banker locomotive is attached at Kasara and are detached at Igatpuri.

== Rake sharing ==
The train shares its rake with 14319/14320 Indore–Bareilly Weekly Express.

== See also ==
- Indore–Bareilly Weekly Express
- Kanpur Central–Amritsar Weekly Express
