= Aligarh Junction railway station =

Railway station in Aligarh district, Uttar Pradesh, India

Aligarh Junction.

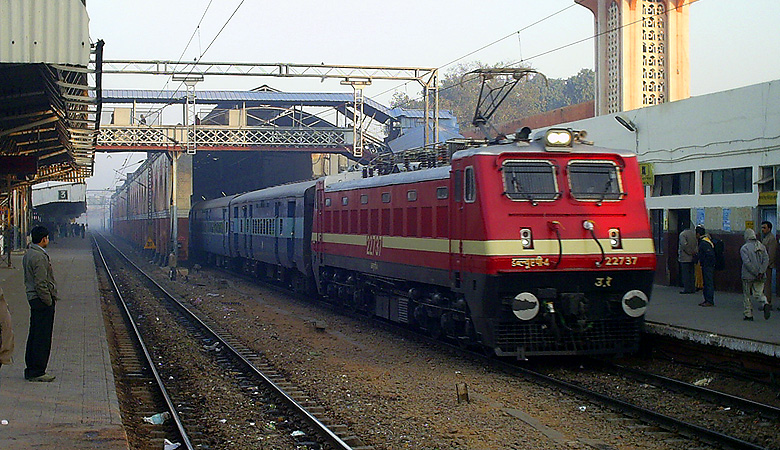
- Aligarh Junction Railway Station

General information
- Location: NH 91, Church compound, Aligarh, Uttar Pradesh, India
- Coordinates: 27°53′22″N 78°04′28″E
- Elevation: 193 metres (633 ft)
- System: Express train and Passenger train station
- Owner: Indian Railways
- Operator: North Central Railway zone
- Lines: Kanpur–Delhi section of Howrah–Delhi main line, Aligarh–Bareilly Branch line and Howrah–Gaya–Delhi line
- Platforms: 7
- Connections: Cabs, City Bus, Auto-rickshaw

Construction
- Structure type: At grade
- Parking: Yes
- Cycle facilities: No

Other information
- Status: Functioning
- Station code: ALJN
- Division(s): Prayagraj

History
- Opened: 1865-66
- Electrified: 1975–76

Passengers
- 205,000 daily

Services
Location
- Location within Uttar Pradesh

Aligarh Junction railway station is an 'NSG 3 category' junction station on the Kanpur–Delhi section of Howrah–Delhi main line and Howrah–Gaya–Delhi line. It is located in Aligarh district in the Indian state of Uttar Pradesh. It serves Aligarh.

== History ==
Trains started running on the East Indian Railway Company's Howrah–Delhi line in 1866.

The Bareilly–Moradabad Chord via Rampur, with a branch line to Aligarh, was built by Oudh and Rohilkhand Railway in 1894.

== Electrification ==
The Tundla–Hathras—Aligarh–Ghaziabad and Aligarh–Harduaganj sectors were electrified in 1975–76.

== Infrastructure ==
There are Seven platforms with three foot bridges. Lift facility is available at platform numbers 1&2,3&4,5&6. Escalators also available at platform 2 and 7. A new terminal at city side is now also in working.

It also has two double-bedded non-AC retiring rooms.

== Accident ==
Five people were killed and many others injured in an accident at Aligarh railway station on the evening of Sunday 19 June 2011. The accident took place when a goods train was passing a crowded platform. According to officials, a brake lever snapped from the train, and the projecting wheel ploughed into passengers waiting at the platform. There were many people waiting for the Delhi–Tundla passenger train on the platform. The hand brake and the connecting rod had come loose and the protruding object turned deadly for the victims. While two people died on the spot, three others succumbed to their injuries in hospital. At least six other injured people were admitted to Jawahar Lal Nehru Medical College Hospital at Aligarh Muslim University.

== Major trains ==
- Anand Vihar Terminal–Ayodhya Cantonment Vande Bharat Express
- Mau–Anand Vihar Terminal Express
- Neelachal Express
- Nandan Kanan Express
- Lucknow–New Delhi Swarna Shatabdi Express
- Kanpur–New Delhi Shatabdi Express
- Darbhanga–Anand Vihar Terminal Amrit Bharat Express
- Champaran Humsafar Express
- Kaifiyat Express
- Brahmaputra Mail
- Farakka Express (via Sultanpur)
- Farakka Express (via Ayodhya Cantt)
- Bhagalpur–Anand Vihar Terminal Garib Rath Express
- Rewa–Anand Vihar Superfast Express
- Jaynagar–Anand Vihar Garib Rath Express
- North East Express
- Lichchavi Express
- Magadh Express
- Amrapali Express
- Sangam Express
- Lokmanya Tilak Terminus–Bareilly Weekly Express
- Indore–Bareilly Weekly Express
- Sambalpur–Jammu Tawi Express
- Muri Express
- Gomti Express
- Swatantra Senani Superfast Express
- Mahabodhi Express
- Sikkim Mahananda Express
- Netaji Express
- Seemanchal Express
- Poorva Express (via Patna)
- Poorva Express (via Gaya)
- Unchahar Express
- Kalindi Express
- Bhrigu Superfast Express
- Vaishali Express
- Prayagraj Express
- Santragachi–Anand Vihar Superfast Express

== See also ==
- Tundla Junction railway station
- Hathras Junction railway station
- Khurja Junction railway station
- Ghaziabad Junction railway station
- Bareilly Junction railway station

Preceding station	Indian Railways	Following station
Daud Khan towards ?	North Central Railway zone Kanpur–Delhi section	Maharwal towards ?
Terminus	North Central Railway zone Aligarh–Moradabad branch line	Manzurgarhi towards ?
