= Gaini, Uttar Pradesh =

Village in Uttar Pradesh, India

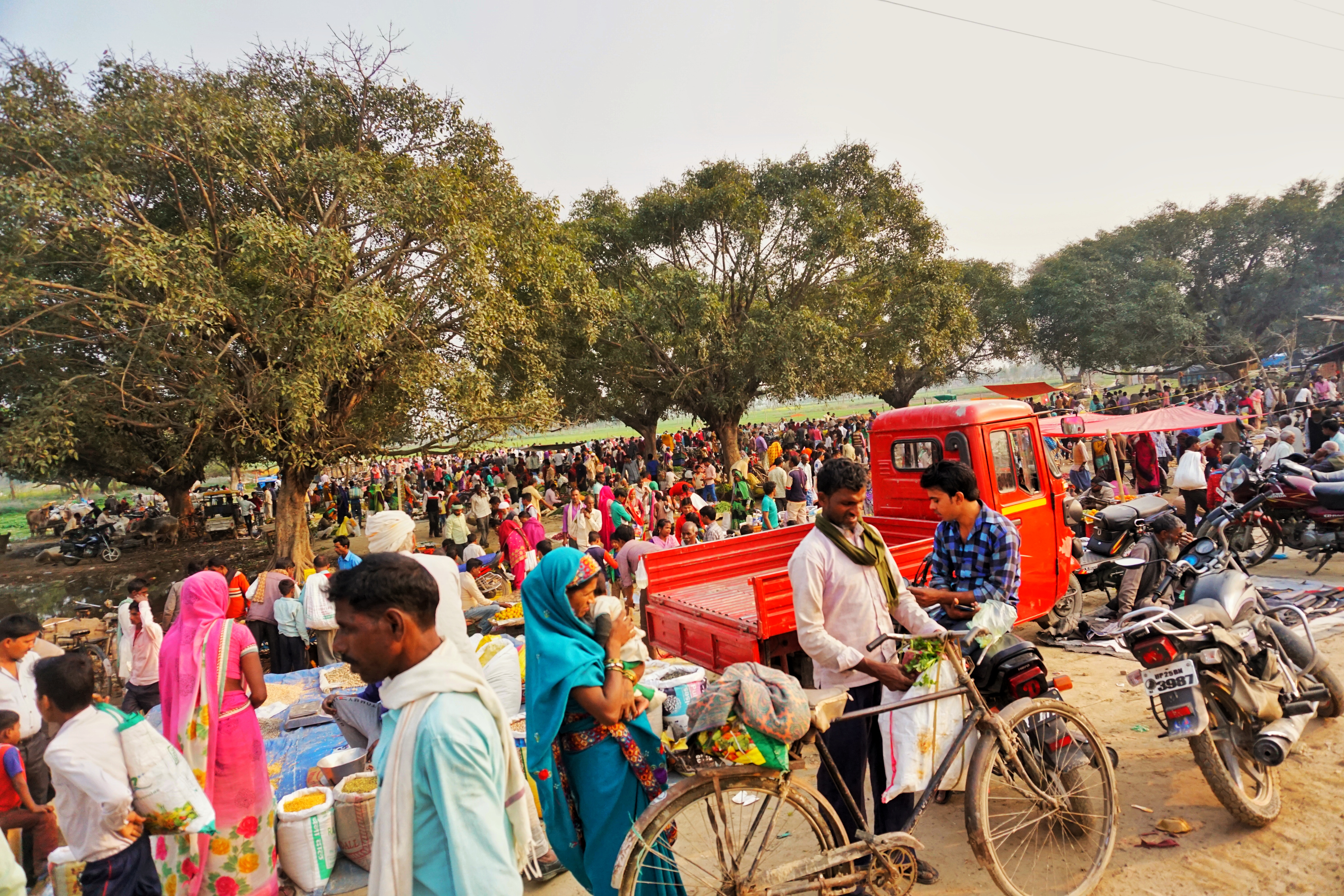
A Hat (Market) in the village

Gaini is a village in Aonla tehsil, Bareilly district, Uttar Pradesh, India. Gaini is located at 28.21°N 79.16°E. Gaini is 22 kilometer (13.6 mi) west from the bareilly railway junction.

== Geography ==
Gaini is located near the RamGanga River.

== Transport ==
=== Road ===
Gaini is well connected by road to all of its surrounding cities. Gaini is connected to Bareilly by a newly built two-lane highway. Gaini has a direct road connection to SH333, Aonla, and Sirouli.

=== Rail ===
Northern Railway: The nearest railway stations are Bisharatganj, 7 kilometres (4.3 mi) away, and Aonla, 13 kilometres (8.1 mi) away. They're both on the Bareilly-Chanduasi-Aligarh railway line. Rail lines include Aligarh Passenger, Sadbhawana Express, Punjab mail Duplicate, Bareilly Delhi Passenger and Bareilly-Una Himachal Express.

North Eastern Railway: The nearest Railway station is Bamiyana. This route is recently undergone gauge conversion, so many long distance services have started again. The lines include Rohilkhand Express and Bareilly Kasganj Passenger. Also trains which are going from Bareilly to Mathura via Lucknow like Ramnagar Bandra Exp also pass through this route.

== Education ==
Chandr Shekhar Azad Inter College is the main college in the area, teaching up to 12th Standard. Sri Sai Munna Lal Saraswati Shishu Mandir is a main source of education for up to 8th standard. This school named after Shri Munna Lal father of Ramesh Bhai Gupta, a well known doctor & social worker. There are 3 to 4 private schools for primary education. There is a government-approved school Gaytri Devi Junior High School named after Shri Gaytri devi.

== Economy ==
=== Agriculture ===
The occupation of 90% of Gaini is agriculture. Apart from the region's main wheat and rice crops, sugarcane, mentha and potato are other cash crops. The climate is suitable for growing sugarcane in the summer and cauliflower, carrot and cabbage in winter.

=== Industry ===
An IFFCO Fertilizer plant is located in Aonla, 13 kilometers away. Mantha Oil Extraction units are now working in Aonla.

== Demographics ==
As of 2001, Gaini had a population of 12,510. Males constitute 53% of the population and females 47%. Gaini has an average literacy rate of 52%, lower than the national average of 59.5%: male literacy is 56% and, female literacy is 44%. In Gaini, 23% of the population is under 5 years of age.

== Politics ==
Gaini Elects Gram Pradhan for local administration. Gaini falls under Aonla parliamentary constituency and West Aonla legislative assembly. Mr. Dharmendra Kashyap is the MP of this area and Mr. Dharmpal is the MLA of this area.

== Facilities ==
Gaini village is equipped with basic facilities such as Punjab National Bank, Post office-India Post, Police Station - Reporting Police chowki.
