= FZD =

FZD may refer to:

- Firozabad railway station, in Uttar Pradesh, India
- Forschungszentrum Dresden-Rossendorf
- Frizzled, a protein family
