= Gomti Express =

Train in India

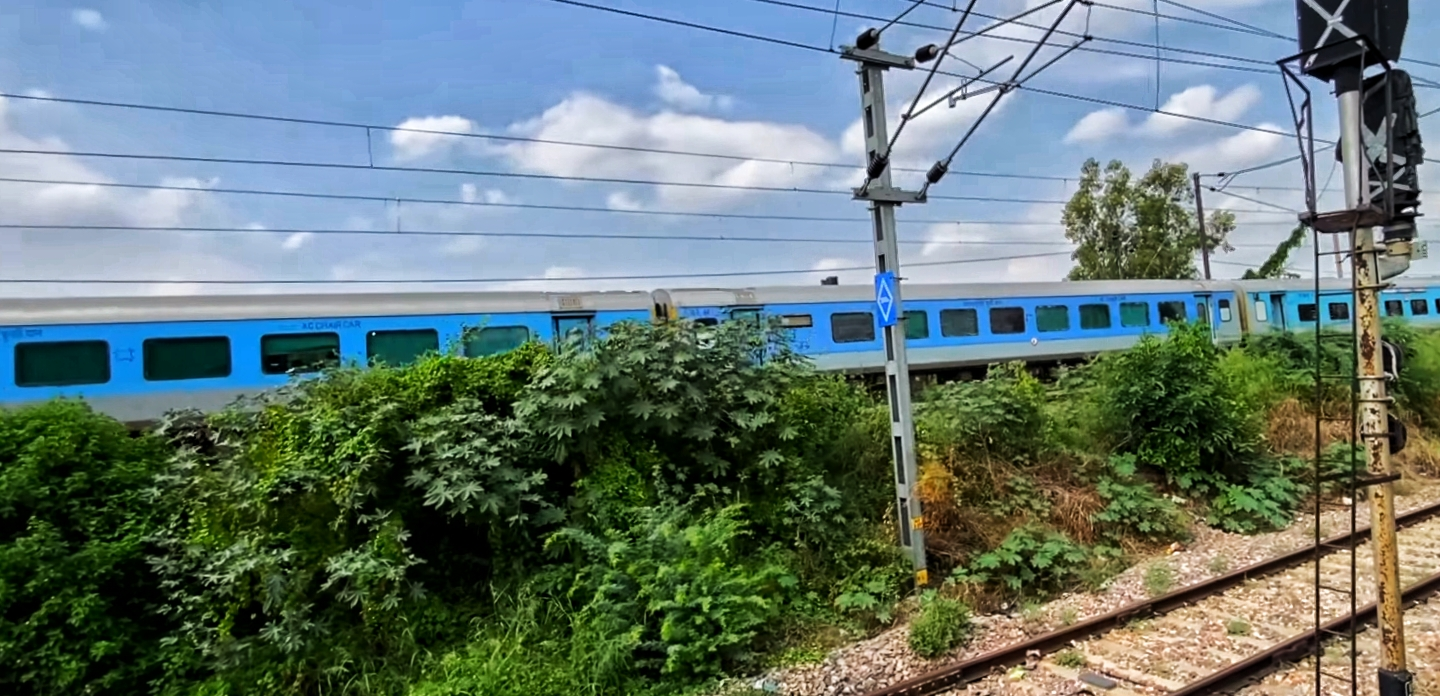
- Gomti Express At New Delhi

Overview
- Service type: Superfast
- First service: 1977; 49 years ago
- Current operator: Northern Railways

Route
- Termini: Lucknow NR (LKO); New Delhi (NDLS)
- Stops: 17
- Distance travelled: 512 km (318 mi)
- Average journey time: 9 hours 13 minutes
- Service frequency: Daily
- Train number: 12419 / 12420

On-board services
- Classes: AC 1st Class, AC 2 tier, AC Chair Car, 2nd Class seating, General Unreserved
- Seating arrangements: Yes
- Sleeping arrangements: Yes
- Catering facilities: Yes
- Observation facilities: Rake Sharing with 14211/14212 Agra Cantt–New Delhi Intercity Express
- Other facilities: WiFi

Technical
- Rolling stock: LHB coach
- Track gauge: 1,676 mm (5 ft 6 in)
- Operating speed: 130 km/h (81 mph) maximum, 55.5 km/h (34 mph) average including halts
Route map
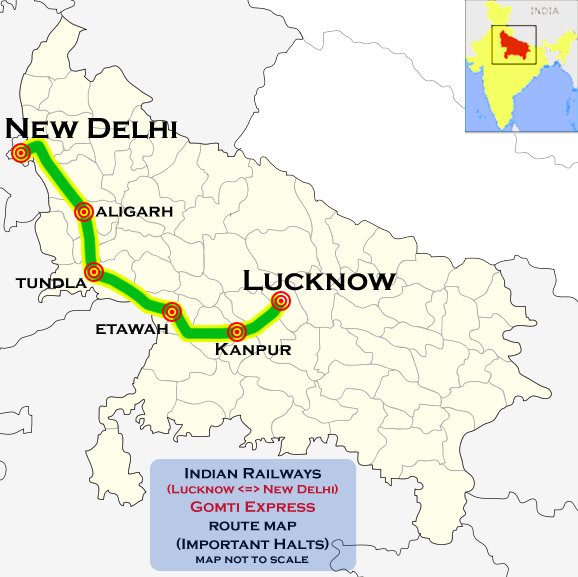

The 12419 / 12420 Gomti Express is a Superfast Express train belonging to Indian Railways – Northern Railway zone that runs between Lucknow NR and New Delhi in India.

It operates as train number 12419 from Lucknow NR to New Delhi and as train number 12420 in the reverse direction serving the states of Delhi and Uttar Pradesh.

It is named after the Gomti River which flows through Lucknow.

== Coaches ==
The 12419 / 20 Lucknow–New Delhi Gomti Express has 1 AC First Class cum AC 2 tier, 2 AC Chair Car, 12 Second Class seating, 5 General Unreserved and 2 EOG (GENERATOR CAR) coaches. It does not carry a pantry car. This train is running with modern German LHB coaches from 8 June 2018 like a Shatabdi Express.

As is customary with most train services in India, coach composition may be amended at the discretion of Indian Railways depending on demand.

== Service ==
The 12419 Lucknow–New Delhi Gomti Express covers the distance of 513 kilometres in 9 hours 5 mins (59.77 km/h) and in 9 hours 5 mins as 12420 New Delhi–Lucknow Gomti Express (57.53 km/h).

As the average speed of the train is above 55 km/h (34 mph), as per Indian Railways rules, its fare includes a Superfast surcharge.

== Route and halts ==
- Lucknow NR
- Unnao Junction
- Kanpur Central
- Panki Dham
- Rura
- Jhinjhak
- Phaphund
- Bharthana
- Etawah Junction
- Shikohabad Junction
- Firozabad
- Tundla Junction
- Hathras Junction
- Aligarh Junction
- Khurja Junction
- Ghaziabad Junction
- New Delhi

== Traction ==
As the entire route is fully electrified, a Kanpur-based WAP-7 or WAP-4 powers the train for its entire journey.

== Timings ==
12419 Lucknow–New Delhi Gomti Express leaves Lucknow NR on a daily basis at 05:45 hrs IST and reaches New Delhi at 15:00 hrs IST the same day.

12420 New Delhi–Lucknow Gomti Express leaves New Delhi on a daily basis at 12:20 hrs IST and reaches Lucknow NR at 21:30 hrs IST the same day.

== Gallery ==
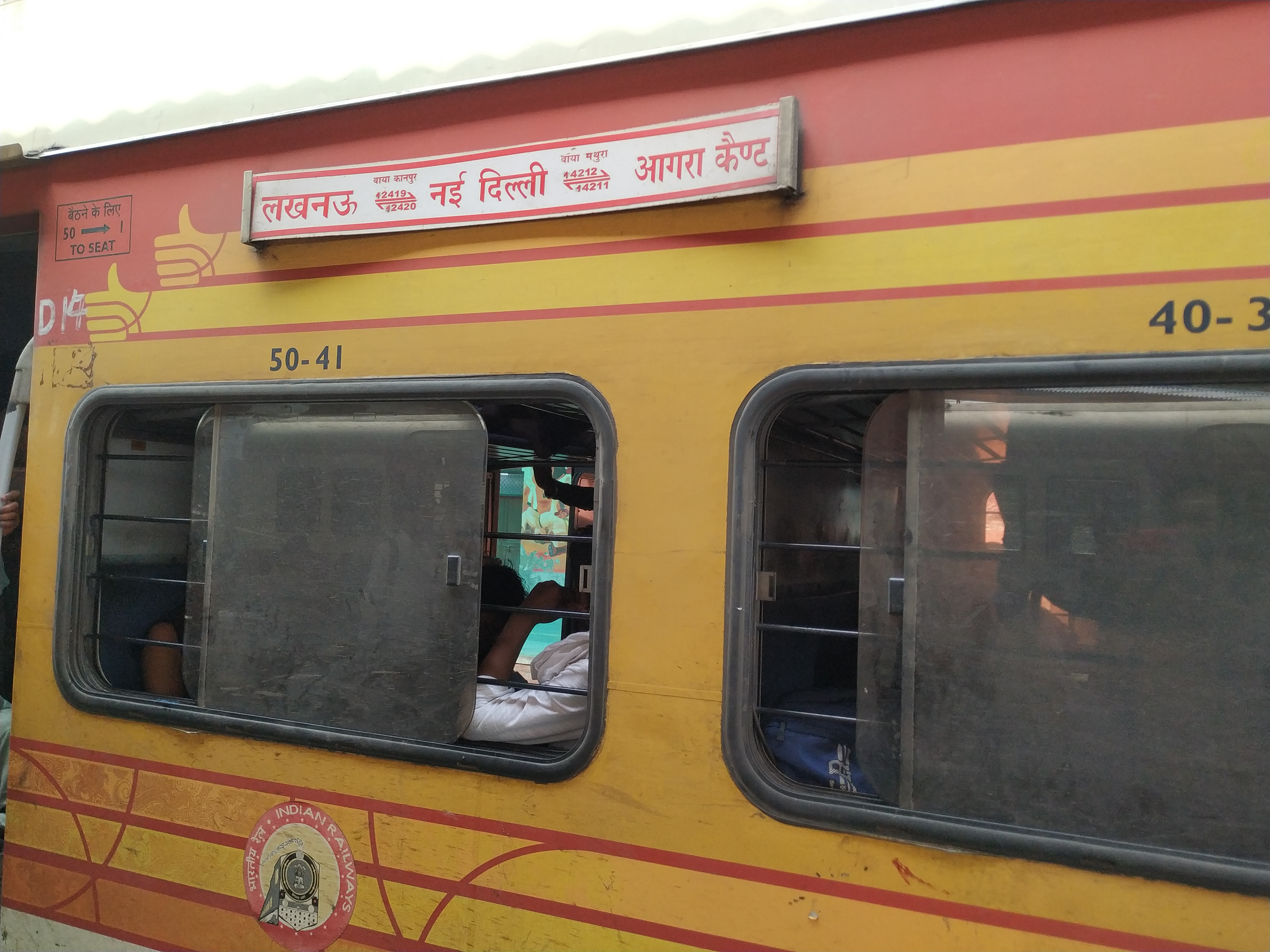
Gomti Express with LHB coach in Ghaziabad Junction.

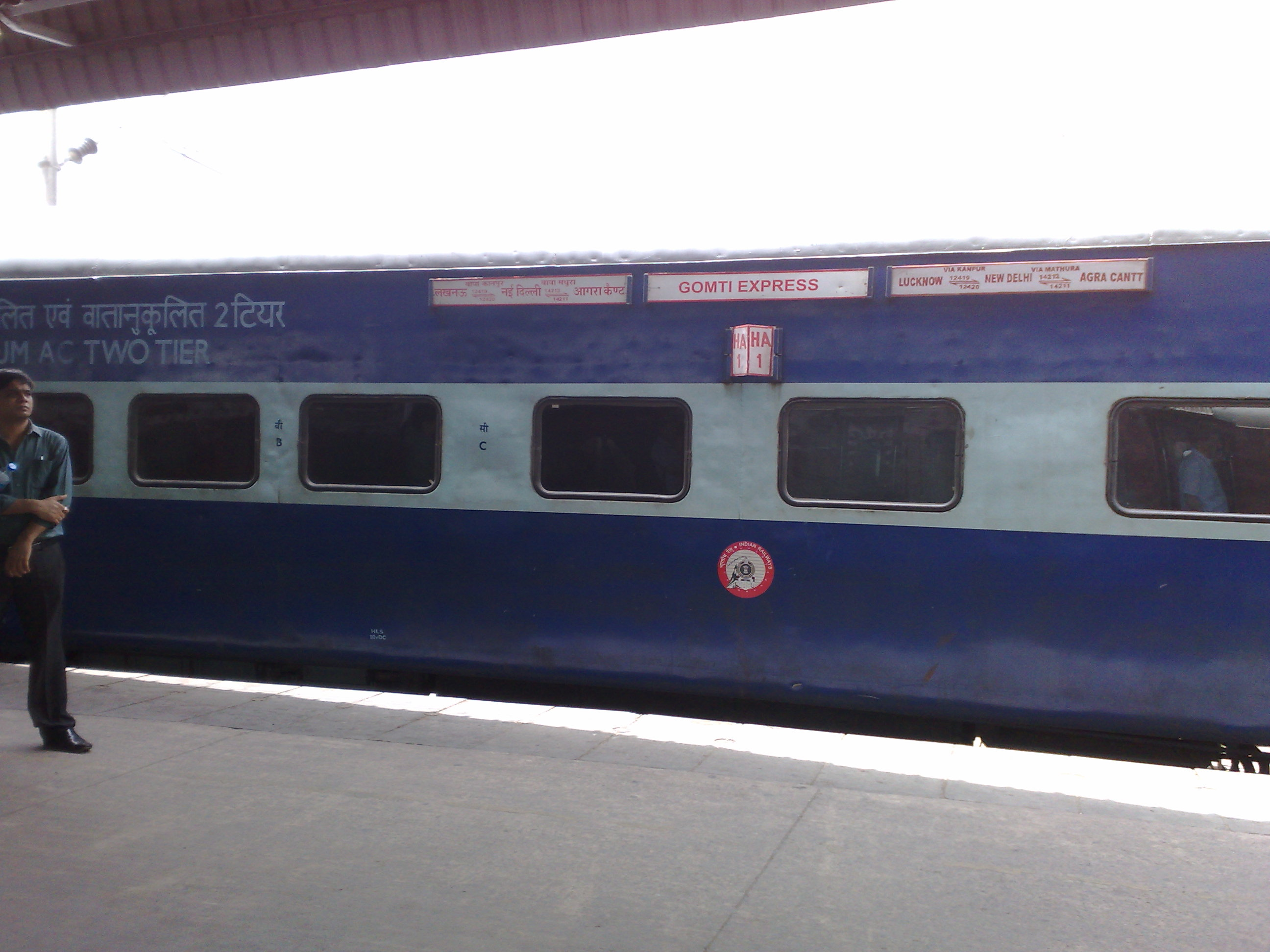
Gomti Express – AC First cum AC 2 tier coach

Gomti Express at New Delhi with its Kanpur-based WAP-4 engine

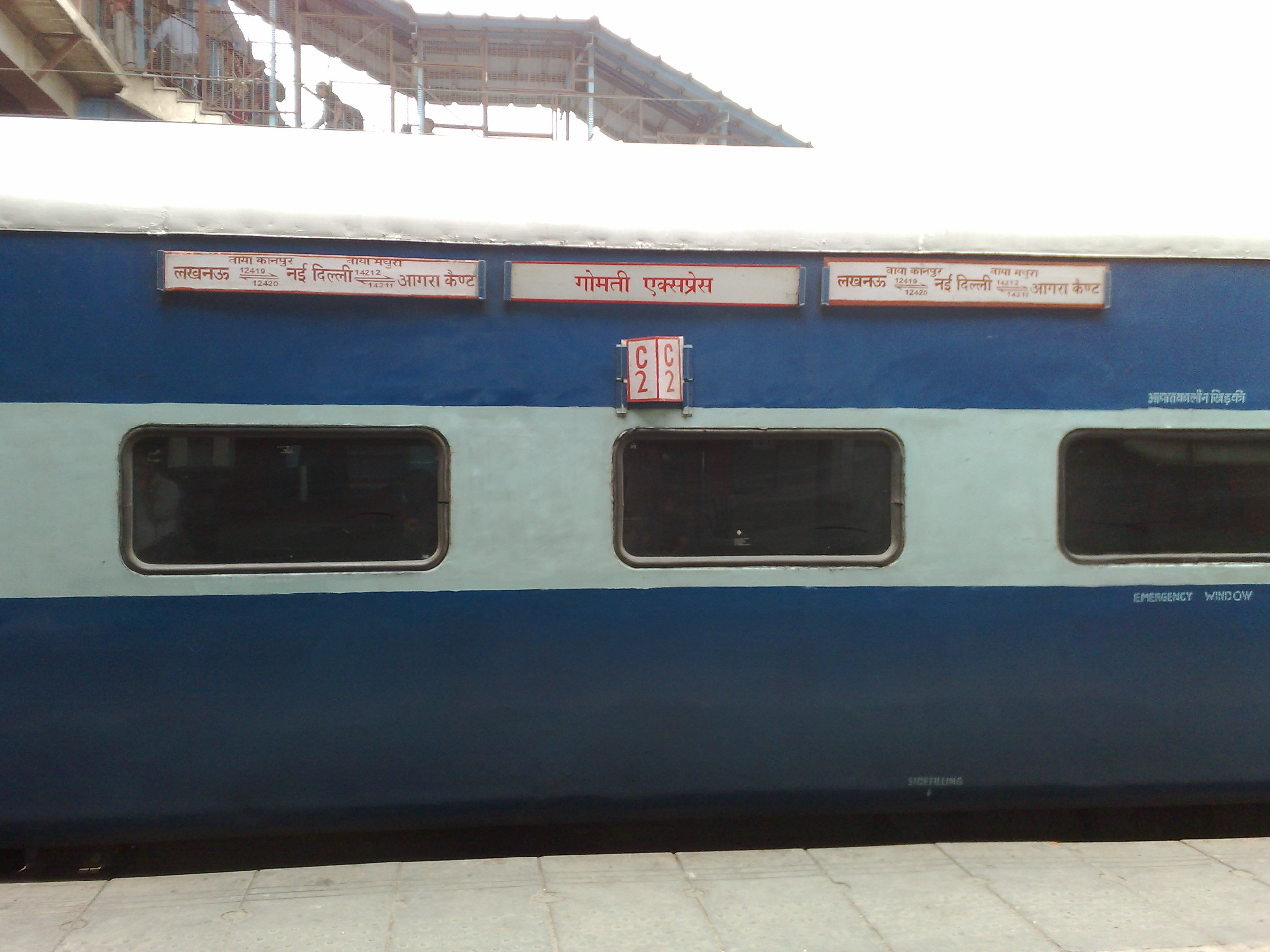
Gomti Express – AC Chair Car coach

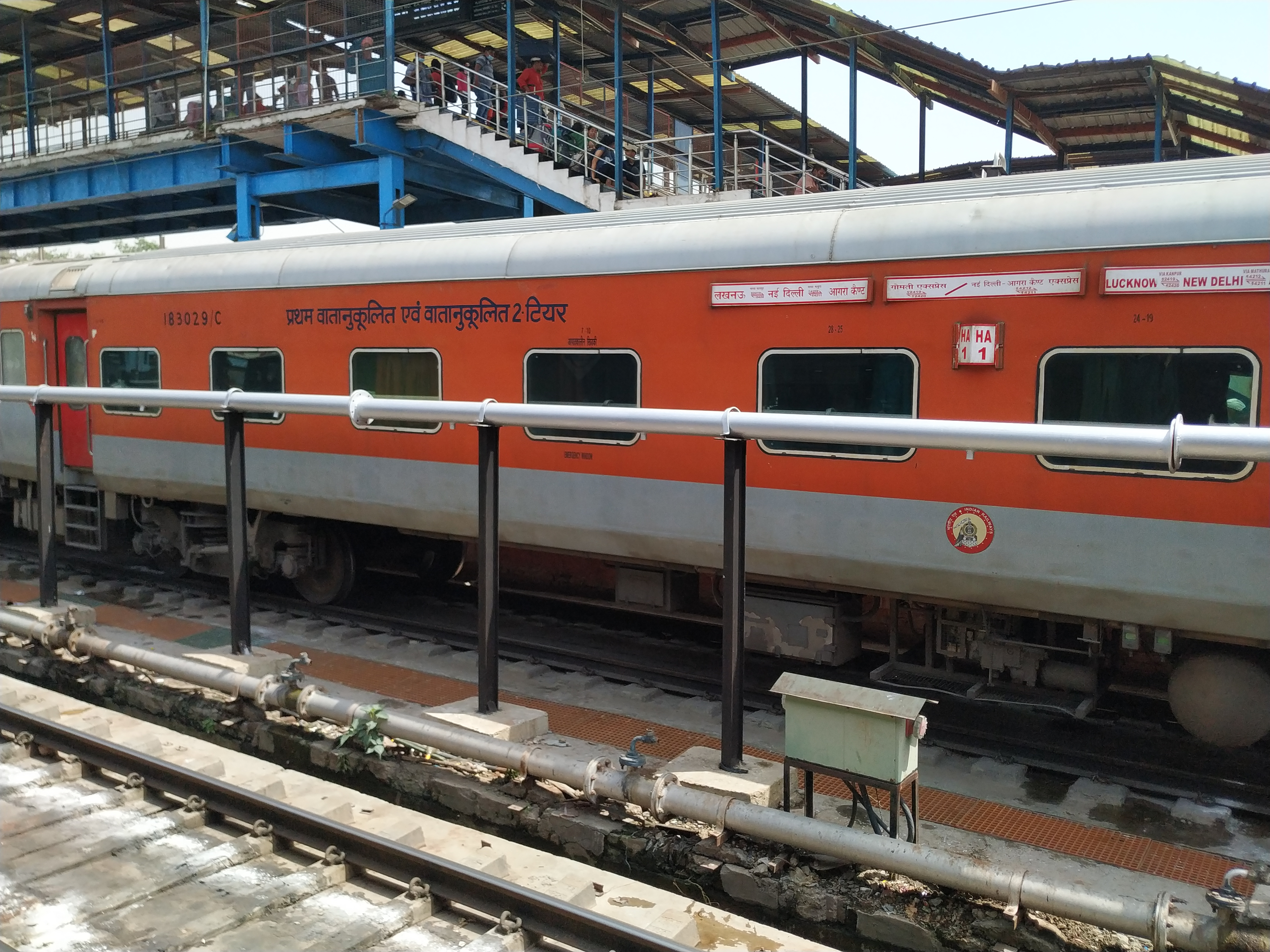
Gomti Express with LHB rakes in New Delhi.

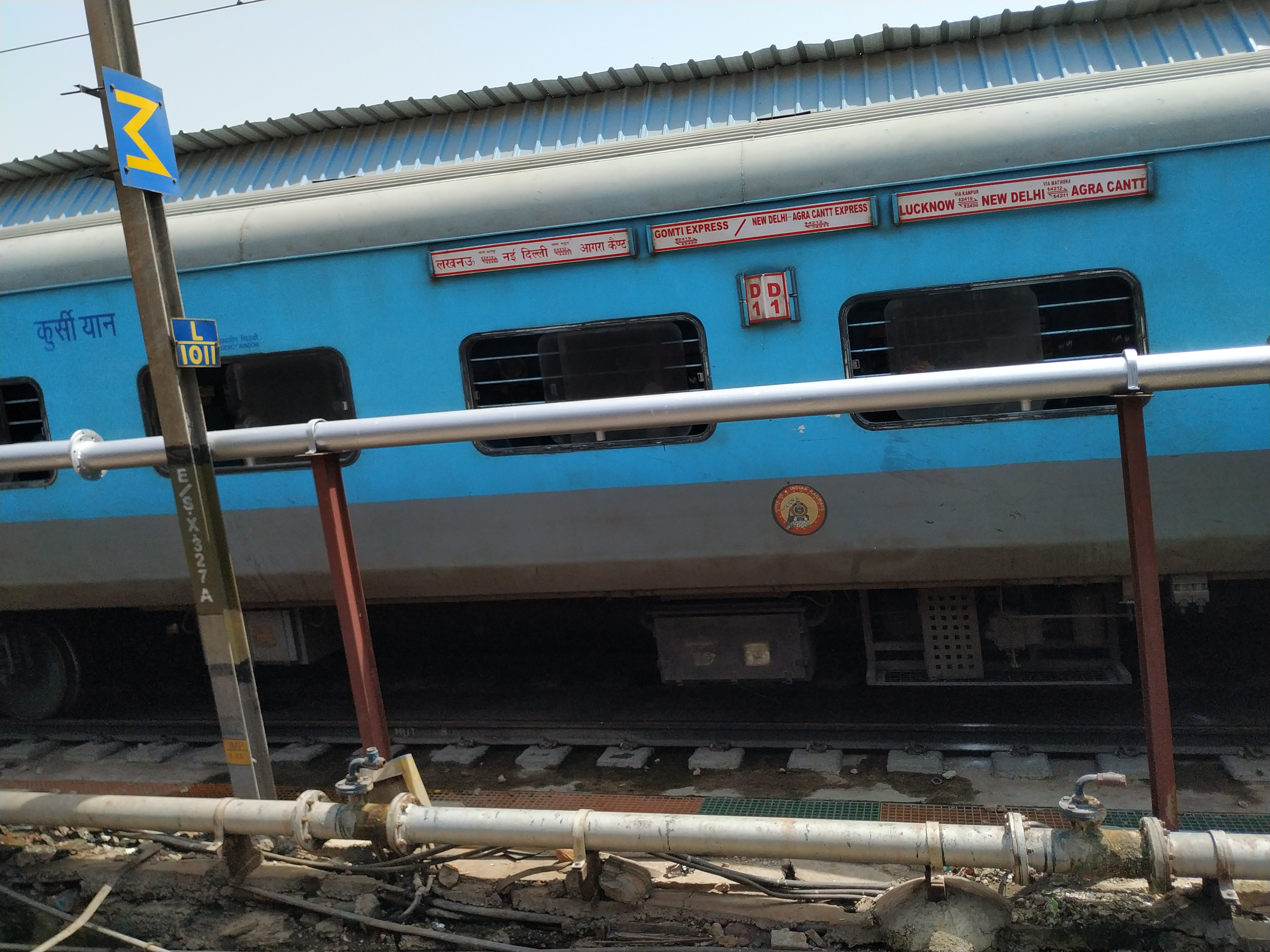
12420 New Delhi-Lucknow Gomti Express in New Delhi railway station
