= Indore–Bareilly Weekly Express =

Train in India

Overview
- Service type: Express
- First service: 1 October 2014; 11 years ago
- Current operator: Northern Railway

Route
- Termini: Indore Junction (INDB); Bareilly Junction (BE)
- Stops: 17
- Distance travelled: 1,038 km (645 mi)
- Average journey time: 23 hrs 10 mins
- Service frequency: Weekly
- Train number: 14319 / 14320

On-board services
- Classes: AC 2 tier, AC 3 tier, Sleeper class, General Unreserved
- Seating arrangements: Yes
- Sleeping arrangements: Yes
- Catering facilities: On-board catering, E-catering
- Entertainment facilities: No
- Baggage facilities: No
- Other facilities: Below the seats

Technical
- Rolling stock: LHB coach
- Track gauge: 1,676 mm (5 ft 6 in)
- Operating speed: 45 km/h (28 mph) average including halts

The 14319 / 14320 Indore–Bareilly Weekly Express is an express train service which runs between Indore, the largest city and commercial capital of central Indian state of Madhya Pradesh and Bareilly, the important city of the Uttar Pradesh.

== Coach composition ==
The train consists of 23 coaches:

- 1 AC II Tier
- 5 AC III Tier
- 12 Sleeper class
- 3 General Unreserved
- 2 Seating cum Luggage Rake

== Service ==
- 14319/ Indore–Bareilly Weekly Express has an average speed of 45 km/h and covers 1038 km in 23 hrs 10 mins.
- 14320/ Bareilly–Indore Weekly Express has an average speed of 43 km/h and covers 1038 km in 23 hrs 55 mins.

== Route and halts ==
The important halts of the train are:

- Indore Junction
- Dewas Junction
- Ujjain Junction
- Shujalpur
- Sehore
- Sant Hirdaram Nagar
- Vidisha
- Bina Junction
- Jhansi Junction
- Gwalior Junction
- Agra Cantonment
- Agra Fort
- Aligarh Junction
- Chandausi Junction
- Aonla
- Bareilly Junction

== Schedule ==
Train number	Station code	Departure station	Departure time	Departure day	Arrival station	Arrival time	Arrival day
14319	INDB	Indore Junction	16:45 PM	Thu	Bareilly Junction	15:20 PM	Fri
14320	BE	Bareilly Junction	11:25 AM	Wed	Indore Junction	08:55 AM	Thu

== Direction reversal ==
Train reverses its direction 1 time at:

- Ujjain Junction

== Traction ==
Both trains are hauled by an Izzatnagar Loco Shed-based WAP-7 electric locomotive from Indore to Bareilly and vice versa.

== See also ==
- Indore Junction
- Bareilly Junction railway station
- Lokmanya Tilak Terminus–Bareilly Weekly Express
