= Gorakhpur–Anand Vihar Express =

Express train

Gorakhpur - Anand Vihar Express
Overview
- Service type: Express
- First service: 25 March 2015; 11 years ago
- Current operator: North Eastern Railway zone

Route
- Termini: Gorakhpur Junction (GKP); Anand Vihar Terminal (ANVT)
- Stops: 6
- Distance travelled: 749 km (465 mi)
- Average journey time: 14 hours 15 mins
- Service frequency: Weekly (Note: Runs twice in a week for every direction.)
- Train number: 12595/12596

On-board services
- Class: AC 3 tier
- Seating arrangements: No
- Sleeping arrangements: Yes
- Catering facilities: No
- Entertainment facilities: No

Technical
- Rolling stock: 1
- Track gauge: 1,676 mm (5 ft 6 in)
- Operating speed: 53 km/h (33 mph)

The Gorakhpur - Anand Vihar Express is an express train of the Indian Railways connecting Gorakhpur in Uttar Pradesh and Anand Vihar Terminal in Delhi via Basti. It is currently being operated with 15057/15058 train numbers on a weekly basis.

== Service ==
It averages 53 km/h as 150575 Gorakhpur - Anand Vihar Express starts on Thursday and covering 749 km in 14 hrs 15 mins and 49 km/h as 12596 Anand Vihar - Gorakhpur - Express starts on Friday covering 7490 km in 15 hrs 10 mins.

== Route and halts ==
- Gorakhpur Junction
- Khalilabad
- Basti
- Gonda Junction
- Lucknow Charbagh
- Moradabad Junction
- Ghaziabad Junction
- Anand Vihar Terminal

== Coach composite ==
The train consists of 21 coaches :

- 1 AC II Tier
- 4 AC III Tier
- 7 Sleeper Coaches
- 8 General
- 2 Second-class Luggage/parcel van

== Rake maintenance ==
The train is maintained by the Anand Vihar Coaching Depot. The same rake is used for Mau - Anand Vihar Terminal Express for one way which is altered by the second rake on the other way.

== Traction ==
Both trains are hauled by a Ghaziabad Loco Shed based WAP-5 or WAP-4 electric locomotives. Occasionally, it has also been hauled by a WAP-7 locomotive.
