= Manauna =

Village in Uttar Pradesh, India

- Village
- Interactive map of Manauna
- Coordinates: 28°16′45″N 79°07′58″E
- Country: India
- State: Uttar Pradesh
- District: Bareilly

Government
  - Body: Gram Panchayat

Population (2011 Census of India)
  - Total: 10,925

Languages
  - Official: Hindi
- Time zone: UTC+5:30 (IST)

Manauna is a village at Aonla tehsil in Bareilly district in the state of Uttar Pradesh, India. Manauna is 1 km from Aonla. It is one of the more populated villages in Aonla tehsil. It has a number of temples, including Brahma Dev Maharaj temple, which devotees from nearby places visit daily. There is also an industrial training institute. According to the 2011 census, this village has a total population of 10925 of which 5770 are males while 5155 are females.
