= Agra Cantt–New Delhi Intercity Express =

Train in India

Agra Cantt - New Delhi Intercity Express
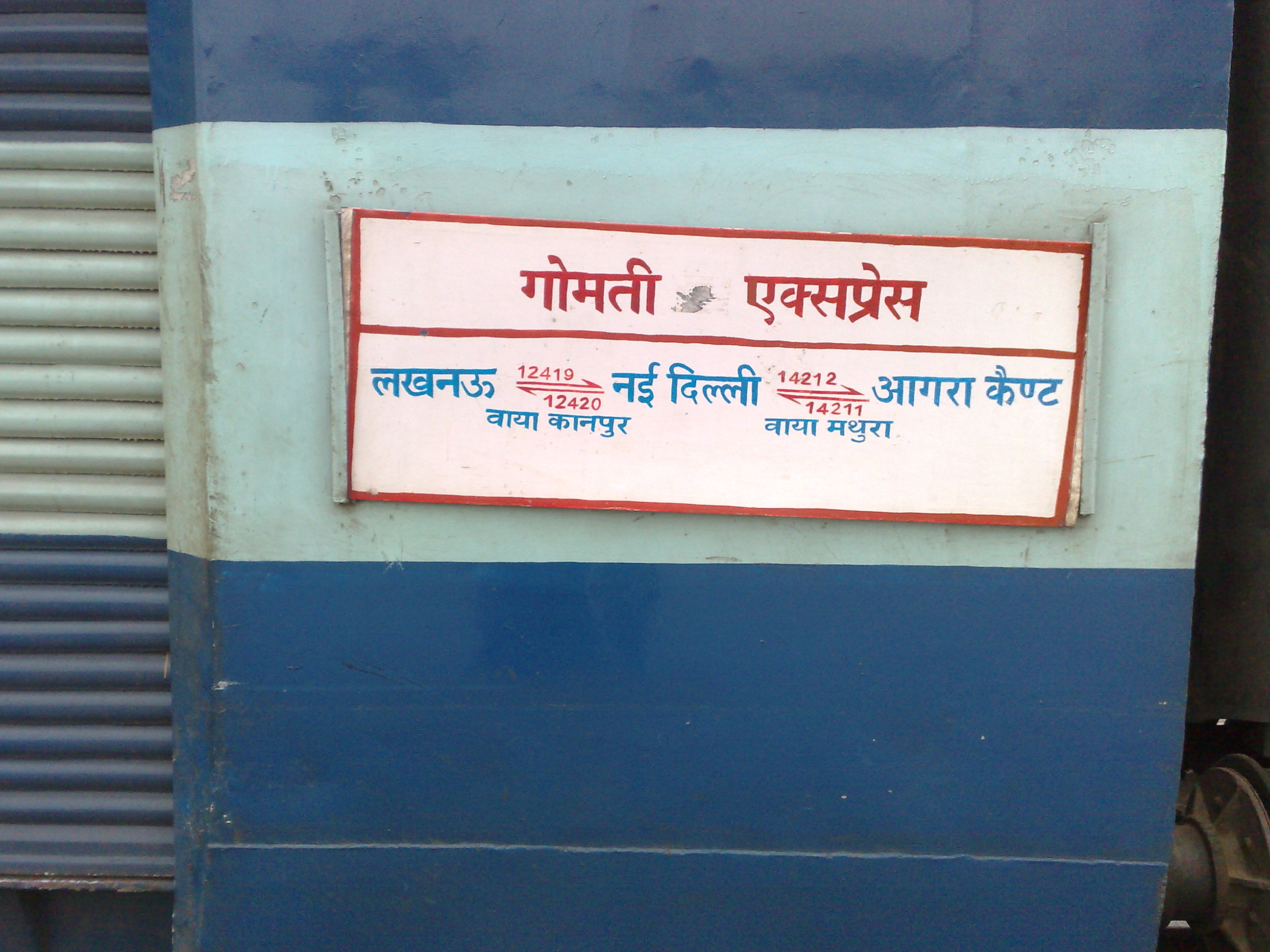

Overview
- Service type: Intercity
- Current operator: North Central Railways

Route
- Termini: Agra Cantt; New Delhi
- Stops: 14
- Distance travelled: 195 km (121 mi)
- Average journey time: 4 hours 20 minutes as 14211 Agra Cantt New Delhi Intercity Express, 4 hours 25 minutes as 14212 New Delhi Agra Cantt Intercity Express
- Service frequency: Daily
- Train number: 14211 / 14212

On-board services
- Classes: AC 1st Class, AC 2 tier, AC Chair Car, 2nd Class seating, General Unreserved
- Seating arrangements: Yes
- Sleeping arrangements: Yes
- Catering facilities: No Pantry Car Coach attached
- Observation facilities: Rake Sharing with 12419 / 20 Gomti Express

Technical
- Rolling stock: LHB coach
- Track gauge: 1,676 mm (5 ft 6 in)
- Operating speed: 110 km/h (68 mph) Maximum Speed; 44.57 km/h (28 mph), including halts
Route map
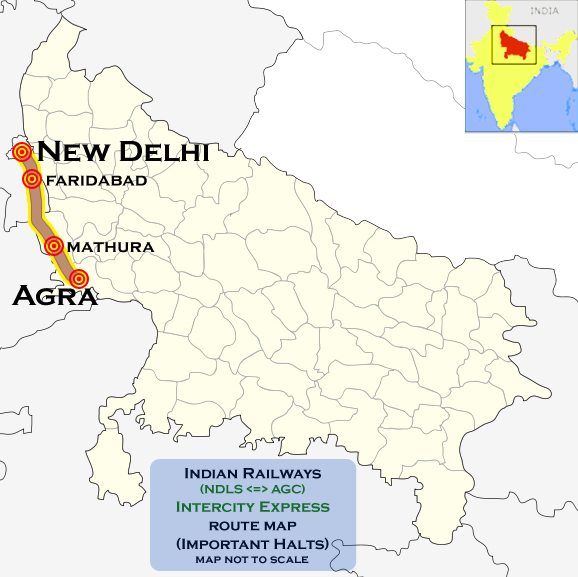

The 14211 / 12 Agra Cantt New Delhi Intercity Express is an Express train belonging to Indian Railways - North Central Railway zone, which runs between Agra Cantt and New Delhi in India, serving the states of Uttar Pradesh, Haryana and Delhi.

It operates as train number 14211 from Agra Cantt to New Delhi railway station and as train number 14212 in the reverse direction.

== Coaches ==
The 14211 / 12 Agra Cantt New Delhi Intercity Express has 1 AC First Class cum AC 2 tier, 2 AC Chair Car, 15 Second Class seating, 4 General Unreserved and 2 EOG (End of Generating car) coaches. It does not carry a Pantry car coach.

As is customary with most train services in India, coach composition may be amended at the discretion of Indian Railways depending on demand.

== Services ==
The 14211 Agra Cantt–New Delhi Intercity Express covers the distance of 195 kilometres in 4 hours 20 mins (45.00 km/h) and in 4 hours 25 mins as the 14212 New Delhi–Agra Cantt Intercity Express (44.15 km/h).

As the average speed of the train is below 55 km/h (34 mph), as per Indian Railways rules, its fare does not include a Superfast surcharge.

== Route ==
The 14211 / 12 Agra Cantt New Delhi Intercity Express runs from Agra Cantt via Mathura Junction, Ballabgarh, Faridabad, Tughlakabad, Hazrat Nizamuddin to New Delhi.

== Traction ==
As the entire route is fully electrified, a Kanpur-based WAP 7 powers the train for its entire journey.

== Timings ==
14211 Agra Cantt–New Delhi Intercity Express leaves Agra Cantt on a daily basis at 06:00 hrs IST and reaches New Delhi at 10:20 hrs IST the same day.

14212 New Delhi–Agra Cantt Intercity Express leaves New Delhi on a daily basis at 17:35 hrs IST and reaches Agra Cantt at 22:05 hrs IST the same day.

== Gallery ==
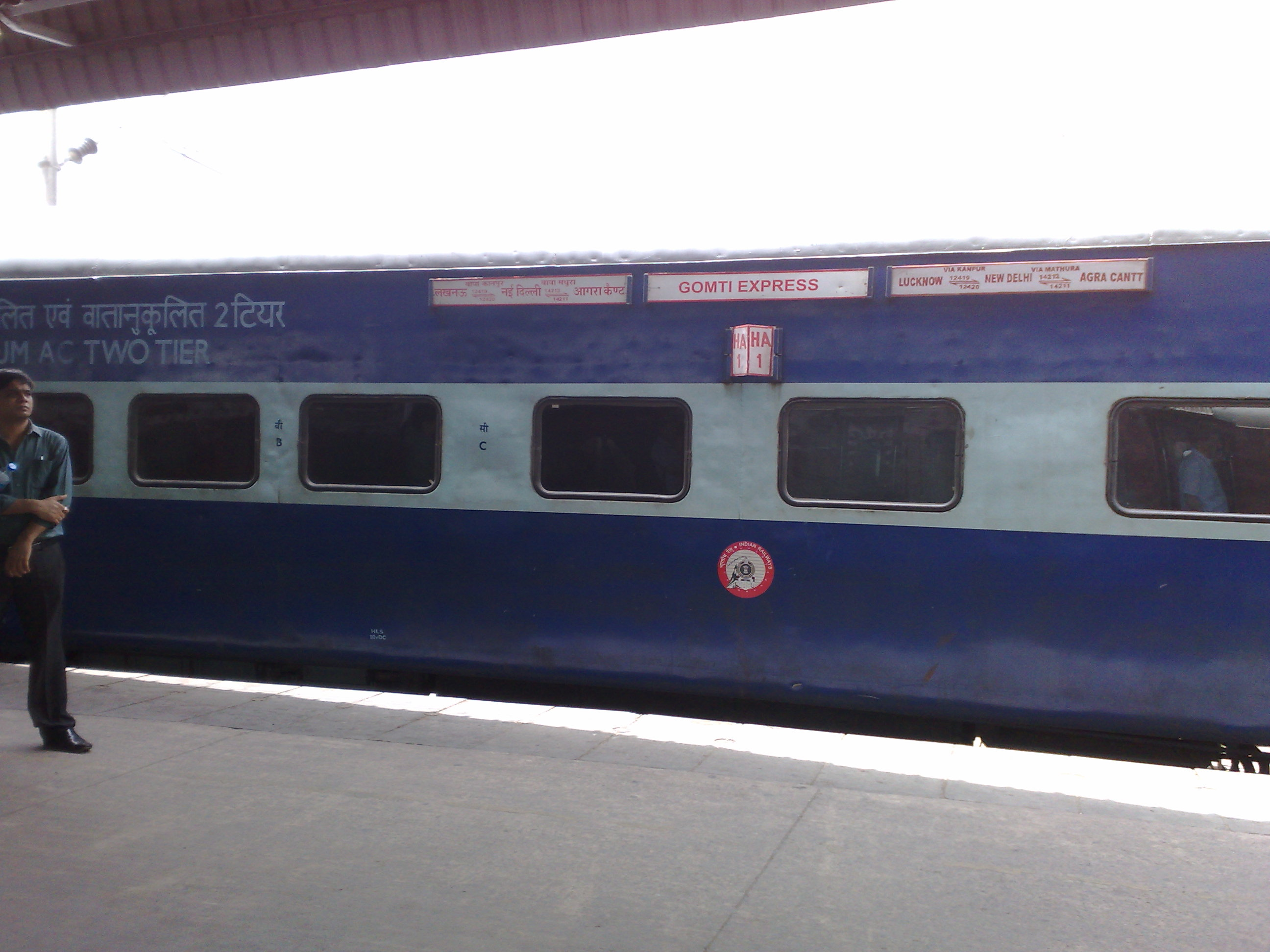
Intercity Express - AC First cum AC 2 tier coach

Intercity Express at New Delhi with its Kanpur based WAP 4 engine

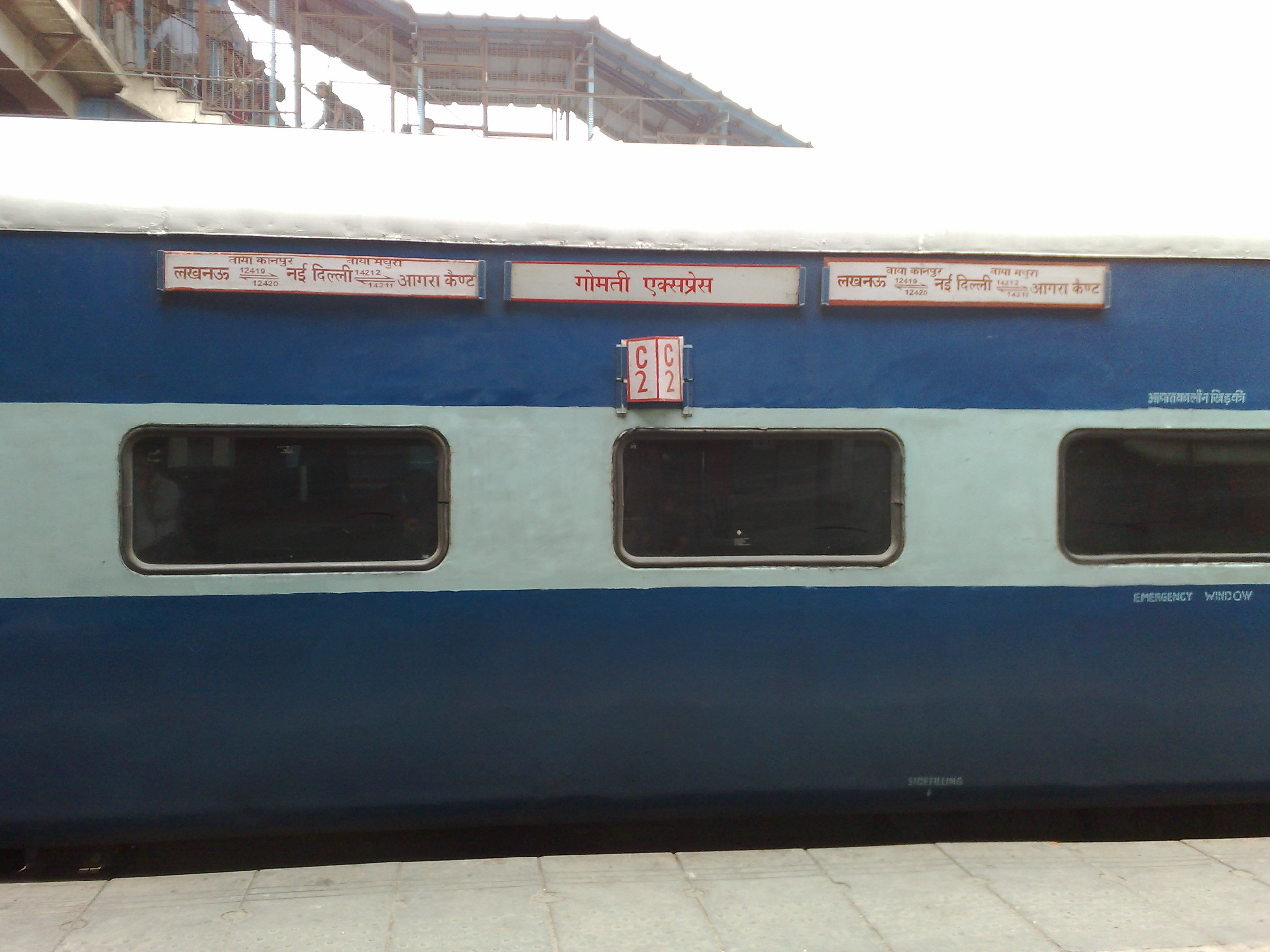
Intercity Express - AC Chair Car coach

== See also ==
- Gatimaan Express
- Lucknow - Agra Cantt. Superfast Intercity Express
