= Anand Vihar Terminal–Ayodhya Cantonment Vande Bharat Express =

Vande Bharat Express train route in India

Anand Vihar Terminal - Ayodhya Cantt Vande Bharat Express
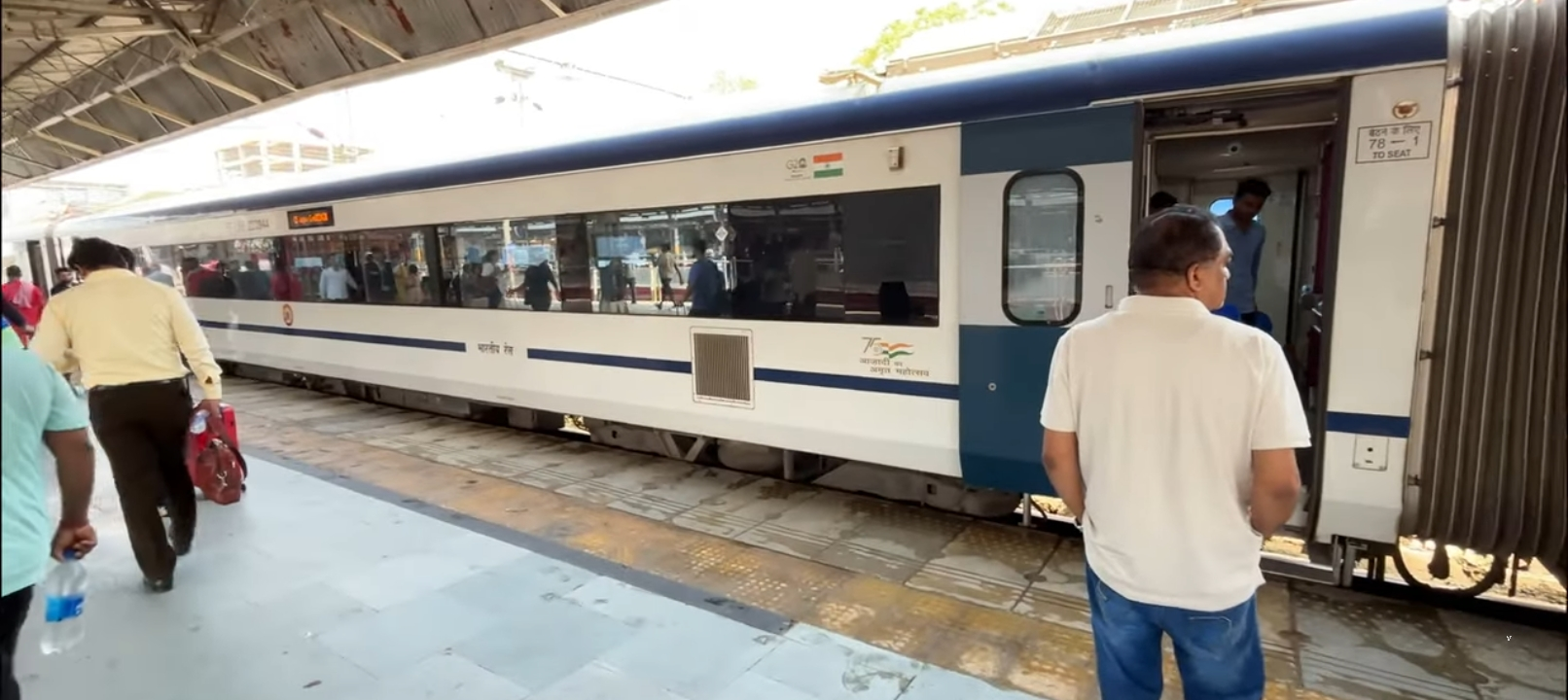
- Anand Vihar Terminal - Ayodhya Cantt Vande Bharat Express At Kanpur Central

Overview
- Service type: Vande Bharat Express
- Locale: New Delhi and Uttar Pradesh
- First service: 30 December 2023 (Inaugural); 4 January 2024; 2 years ago (Commercial)
- Current operator: Northern Railways (NR)

Route
- Termini: Anand Vihar Terminal (ANVT); Ayodhya Cantt (AYC)
- Stops: 04
- Distance travelled: 628 km (390 mi)
- Average journey time: 08 hrs 20 mins
- Service frequency: Six days a week (Note: Except Wednesdays)
- Train number: 22426 / 22425
- Lines used: Delhi–Kanpur line (from Anand Vihar Terminal); Kanpur–Lucknow line; Lucknow–Varanasi line (till Ayodhya Cantt. Jn.)

On-board services
- Classes: AC Chair Car, AC Executive Chair Car
- Seating arrangements: Airline style; Rotatable seats
- Sleeping arrangements: No
- Catering facilities: On board Catering
- Observation facilities: Large windows in all coaches
- Entertainment facilities: On-board WiFi; Infotainment System; Electric outlets; Reading light; Seat Pockets; Bottle Holder; Tray Table
- Baggage facilities: Overhead racks
- Other facilities: Kavach

Technical
- Rolling stock: Mini Vande Bharat 2.0 (Last service: 7 Jan 2024); Vande Bharat 2.0 (Last service: 7 July 2025); Vande Bharat 3.0 (First service: 8 July 2025)
- Track gauge: Indian gauge 1,676 mm (5 ft 6 in) broad gauge
- Electrification: 25 kV 50 Hz AC Overhead line
- Operating speed: 75 km/h (47 mph) (Avg.)
- Average length: 480 metres (1,570 ft) (20 coaches)
- Track owner: Indian Railways
- Rake maintenance: Anand Vihar Terminal (ANVT)

The 22426/22425 Anand Vihar Terminal - Ayodhya Cantonment Vande Bharat Express is India's 36th Vande Bharat Express train, connecting the capital city of New Delhi's Anand Vihar Terminal with Ayodhya, the birthplace of the deity Rama of Kosala in Uttar Pradesh.

This express train was inaugurated on 30 December 2023 by Prime Minister Narendra Modi from Ayodhya Dham Junction.

== Overview ==
This train is operated by Indian Railways, connecting Anand Vihar Terminal, Khurja Junction, Aligarh Junction, Kanpur Central, Lucknow Charbagh and Ayodhya Cantt. It is currently operated with train numbers 22426/22425 on 6 days a week basis. From 16 August 2024, Aligarh Junction has also been added as experimental stoppage.

== Rakes ==
It was the thirty-fourth 2nd Generation and twenty-first Mini Vande Bharat 2.0 Express train which was designed and manufactured by the Integral Coach Factory at Perambur, Chennai under the Make in India Initiative.

This conversion of 8 coaches to 16 coaches commenced on 9 January 2025, as this would benefit the passengers heading towards the Skandagupta's Ayodhya tourist destination via the capital city of Lucknow in Uttar Pradesh. Further the conversion of 16 coaches to 20 coaches commenced on 8 July 2025, thereby favouring many passengers to reach the divine Ram Mandir in Ayodhya.

== Service ==
The 22426/22425 Anand Vihar Terminal - Ayodhya Cantt Jn Vande Bharat Express operates six days a week except Wednesdays, covering a distance of 628 km (390 mi) in a travel time of 8 hours with an average speed of 75 km/h (47 mph). The service has 4 intermediate stops. The Maximum Permissible Speed is 130 km/h (81 mph).

== See also ==
- Vande Bharat Express
- Tejas Express
- Gatimaan Express
- Anand Vihar Terminal
- Ayodhya Cantt. Junction railway station
