= Aonla, Uttar Pradesh =

Aonla
- Town
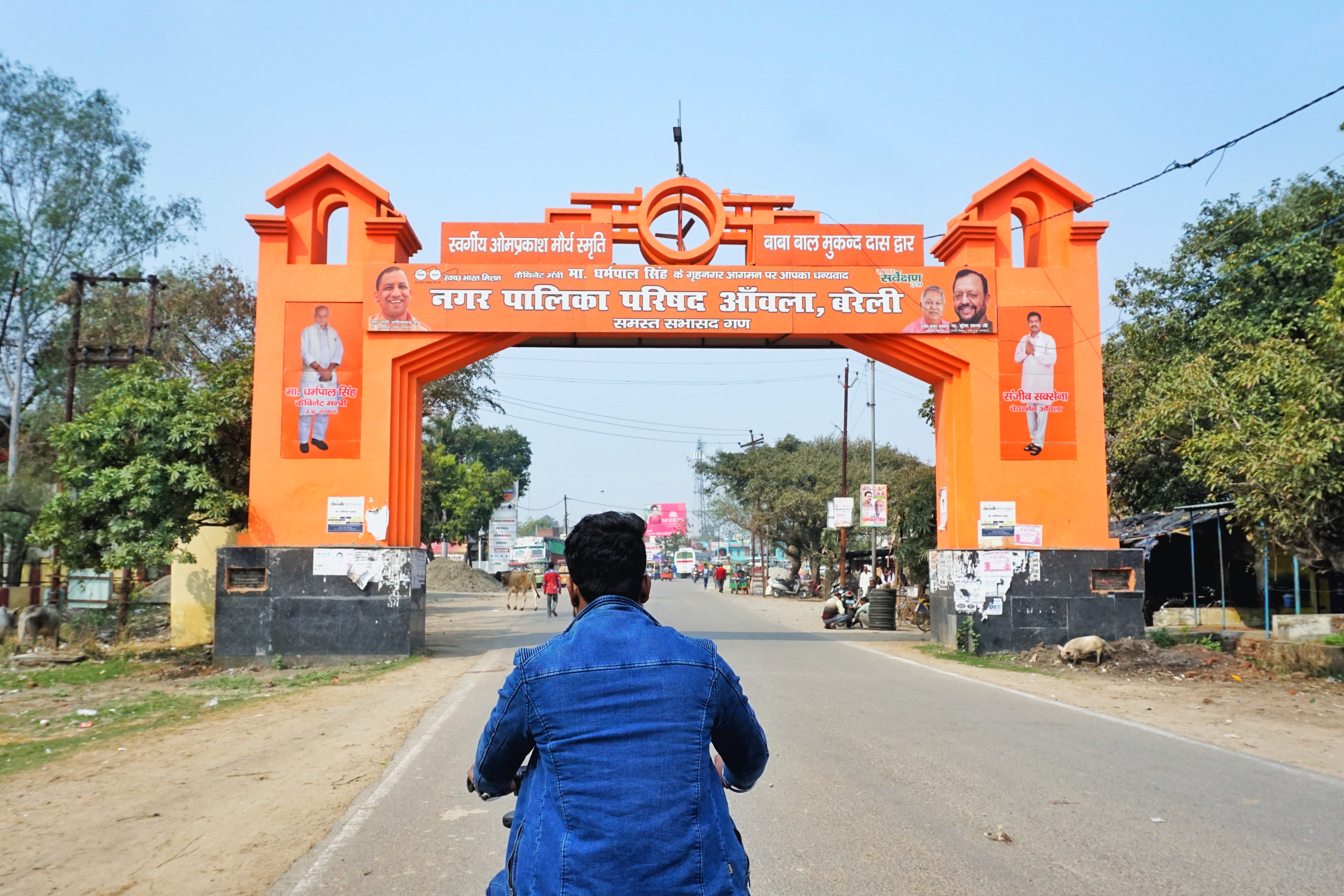
- Entry gate to the town

- Location in Uttar Pradesh, India Aonla (India)
- Coordinates: 28.28°N 79.15°E
- Country: India
- State: Uttar Pradesh
- District: Bareilly

Government
  - Type: District Magistrate-Shri Nitish Kumar (IAS) Sub Divisional Magistrate-Shri Vishu Raja (IAS) Judicial Magistrate-Shri Ravi Kumar Sagar (PCS-J) Tehsildar- Archi Gupta (PCS)
- Elevation: 237 m (778 ft)

Population (2011)
  - Total: 55,629

Languages
  - Official: Hindi
- Time zone: UTC+5:30 (IST)
- PIN: 243301
- Telephone code: 05823
- Vehicle registration: UP-25
- Website: up.gov.in

Aonla is a town, also a proposed district and a municipal board in Bareilly district in the state of Uttar Pradesh, India.

Proposed district consists of three tehsils:

1. Aonla,
2. Bisauli,
3. Dataganj

== Name ==
The name Aonla may be derived from the aonla tree, Phyllanthus emblica.

== History ==
Aonla was a stronghold of the Kateharia Rajputs by at least the 14th century. By the time of Akbar it was the seat of a pargana. It is mentioned in the Ain-i-Akbari as a pargana in the sarkar of Budaun, producing a revenue of 690,620 dams for the imperial treasury and a force of 400 infantry and 50 cavalry to the Mughal army. The pargana of Aonla survived almost completely unchanged until the 20th century, although c. 1835 it was expanded by the addition of 14 villages from the Ajaun pargana, including Ajaon itself.

Aonla's period of greatest importance, however, was during the 1700s. In 1730, the Rohilla leader Ali Muhammad Khan had the local Katehria king, Durjan Singh, assassinated;(The remains of the palace of Raja Durjan Singh still can be seen in Mohalla लठैता) then took over Aonla and made it his capital. Aonla served as the capital of the Rohilla confederation for more than a quarter of a century, and many Rohilla leaders were buried here. According to local tradition, the city had no fewer than 1,700 mosques at its height. After the Rohillas moved their capital to Bareilly, Aonla quickly lost its importance, and its many monuments fell into ruin. In 1813 it was made the seat of a tehsil, and it grew to become an important town again, with thriving commerce and a large export of grain.

Around the 20th century, Aonla was described as a very dispersed town with four distinct quarters, separated by cemetery fields and old ruined mosques. The first quarter was Aonla Khas, also called Ganj or Qila. The name "Qila" was derived from the eponymous brick fort where the Rohillas had held court. The qila, entered from the street by a plain and unimposing gate, consisted of two separate yards. In the outer yard was the open-pillared diwan-khana or audience hall, and in the inner yard were several buildings which had previously served as the tehsil office and police station but, by the early 20th century, had fallen into decay. Across the street from the qila was the mosque of Bakhshi Sardar Khan. Another mosque was that of Fateh Khan Khansaman, which had 12 domes but was in disrepair at the time. The largest mosque in the quarter was called the Begam's mosque. The Aonla Khas quarter had two main streets, each lined with brick houses; the largest house belonged to the respected family known as the Aonla Hakims.

The second quarter was called Pakka Katra, after the high brick wall that surrounded it. Pakka Katra was densely populated and served as the main business center of the town. On the south side of this quarter was a large walled enclosure containing the tomb of Ali Muhammad Khan, maintained by his descendant, the Nawab of Rampur State. Outside the enclosure there was an ornate masonry tank with steps leading down to the water, surrounded by many more Rohilla tombs. The last two quarters were Sarai (to the east of Pakka Katra, near the road to Budaun) and Kachcha Katra (extending to the west towards Manauna).

Aonla was made a notified area in 1908. Markets were held twice a week in two marketplaces, one called the Maharaj Datt Ram and the other called the Deputy Sahib. Its streets were narrow and largely unpaved, and there was a railway station on the north side of town, closest to the Aonla Khas quarter. The tehsil offices were located to the northeast, and there was a police station, two post offices, a cattle-pound, a dispensary, a middle vernacular school, and a girls' school.

== Demographics ==
According to the 2011 census of India, Aonla has a population of 55,629, including 29,231 males and 26,398 females. Schedule Castes (SC) constitute 7.56% of the total population; there are no Schedule Tribes in the area and a majority of Thakur's and Muslims.

== Administration ==
Aonla is administered by a Nagar Palika Parishad (municipal body), for which elections are held every 5 years. The Parishad is divided into 26 wards. Aonla is also a tehsil headquarter. It is headed by a Sub Divisional Magistrate incharge of revenue and criminal administration. Aonla has total 369 revenue villages.

== Industry ==
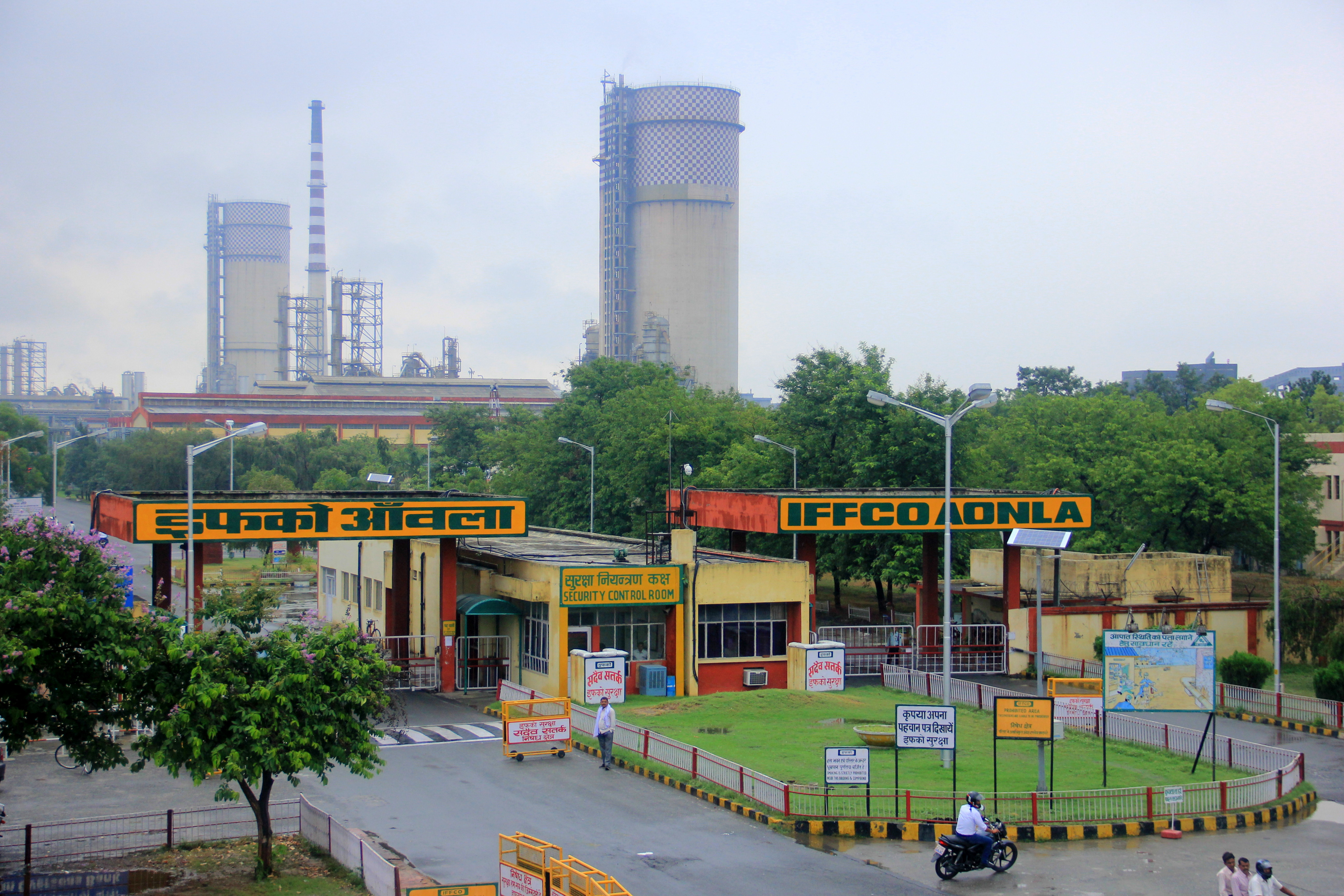
iffco aonla plant

- Fertilizer Industry - IFFCO Plant
- Oil Industry - HPCL Depot

Places to Visit

- Shri Ahichchhatra Parshvanath Atishaya Teerth Kshetra Digambar Jain Mandir, Ramnagar
- Begum's Masjid jor three lofty domes
- Ramnagar Fort
- Bhim's Gada, Ramnagar
- Ancient Site, Ramnagar
- Puraina Mandir, Aonla
- Tedeshwar Mandir, Aonla

== Transport ==
Kanpur - Laknaow - Muradabad railway line passing through Aonla, The city is served by the Aonla railway station. Many passenger and express train halting in Aonla.
