= Babrala railway station =

Railway station in Uttar Pradesh, India

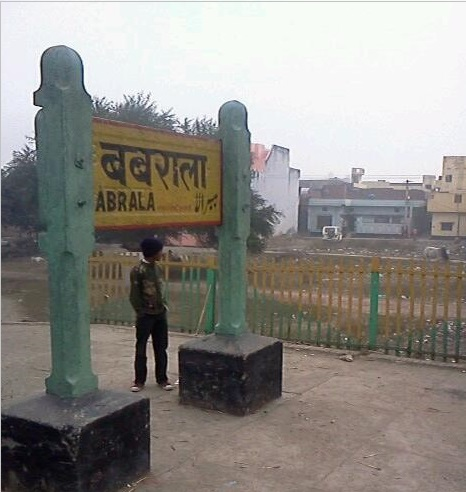

General information
- Location: Sambhal district, Uttar Pradesh; India
- Coordinates: 28.27°N 78.4°E
- Elevation: 185 metres (607 ft)
- Operator: North Central Railway

Construction
- Structure type: Standard (on-ground station)
- Parking: Yes

Other information
- Status: Functioning
- Station code: BBA
- Zone(s): North Central Railway
- Division(s): Agra
Location
- Location within India Location within Uttar Pradesh

Babrala railway station (station code BBA) is a small railway station located in Sambhal district in the Indian state of Uttar Pradesh. Babrala railway station belongs to Northern Railway, Moradabad. Nearby stations are Rajghat Narora and Bhakrauli and Moradabad railway station is a major station.

== Major trains ==
- Aligarh–Moradabad Passenger
- Bandikui–Bareilly Passenger
- Bandikui–Rishikesh Passenger
- Bareilly–Bandikui Passenger
- Aligarh–Bareilly Passenger
- Farrukhabad–Bareilly Passenger
- Link Express
- Mumbai LLT Weekly Express (Bareilly–Babrala–Mumbai)

== See also ==
- Northern Railway zone
- Babrala
