= Mau–Anand Vihar Terminal Express =

Indian Railways train

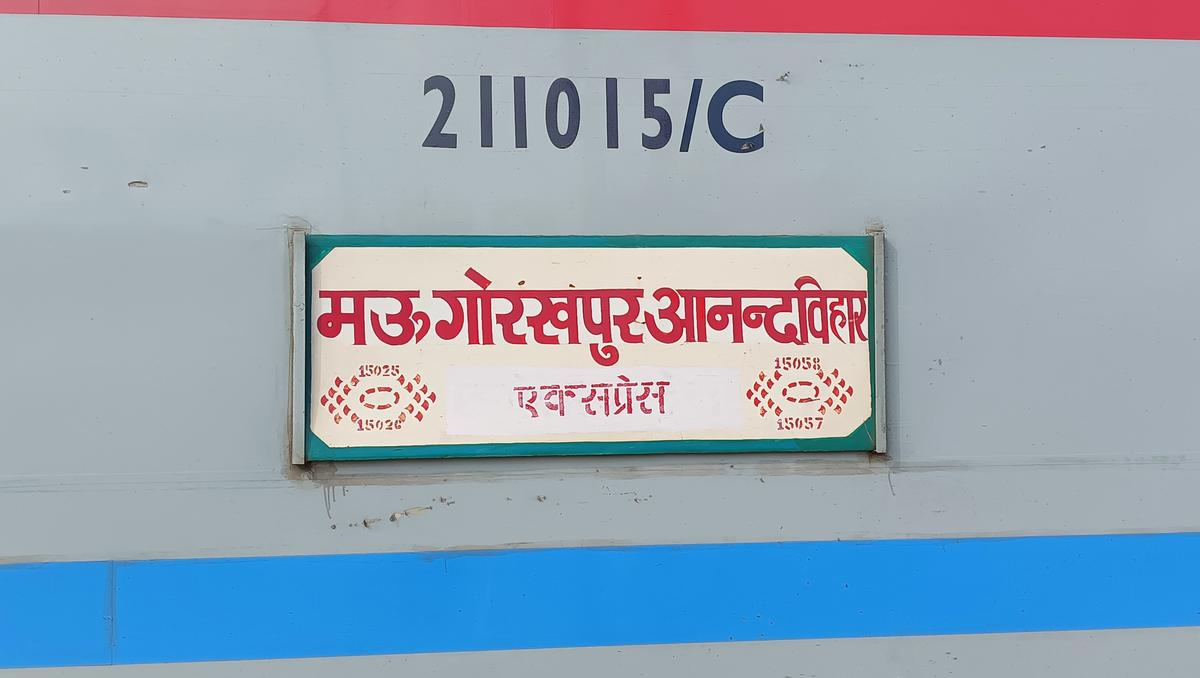

Overview
- Service type: Express
- First service: 1 October 2013
- Current operator: North Eastern Railway zone

Route
- Termini: Mau Junction; Anand Vihar Terminal
- Stops: 10
- Distance travelled: 832 kilometres (517 miles)
- Average journey time: 16 hours 15 minutes
- Service frequency: Bi-weekly (Note: Runs twice in a week for every direction.)
- Train number: 15025 / 15026

On-board services
- Classes: AC-II, AC-III, Sleeper, General
- Seating arrangements: Yes
- Sleeping arrangements: Yes
- Catering facilities: Not available

Technical
- Track gauge: 1,676 mm (5 ft 6 in)
- Operating speed: Maximum: 130 km/h (81 mph) on Kanpur to Ghaziabad section Average: 50 km/h (31 mph) (including halts), 53 km/h (33 mph) (excluding halts)

Mau–Anand Vihar Terminal Express, is an Indian Railways train of North Eastern Railway Zone Varanasi Division. It was introduced in 2013's Railway Budget and hence initiated its journey from November 2013. It operates bi-weekly and covers a distance of 833 kilometres (518 mi) from Mau Junction to Anand Vihar Terminal. Mau Express consists of 23 coaches which includes one AC-II coach, four AC-III coaches, seven sleeper class coaches, nine general (unreserved) coaches and two SLR coaches.

== Reservation ==
People have to take an advanced reservation ticket to travel in the train except for the General class. Tatkal Ticket facility also available in this train.

== Coach composition ==
Loco	1	2	3	4	5	6	7	8	9	10	11	12	13	14	15	16	17	18	19	20	21	22	23
	SLR	GEN	GEN	GEN	GEN	GEN	B1	B2	B3	B4	A1	S1	S2	S3	S4	S5	S6	S7	GEN	GEN	GEN	GEN	SLR

== Rake maintenance ==
The train is maintained by the Anand Vihar Coaching Depot. The same rake is used for Gorakhpur–Anand Vihar Express for one way which is altered by the second rake on the other way.

== Journey ==
It takes around 16 hours to cover its journey of 833 kilometres (518 mi) with an average speed of 52 kilometres per hour (32 mph).

== Traction ==
Both trains are hauled by a Ghaziabad-based Indian locomotive class WAP-5 electric locomotive.
