= Shikohabad Junction railway station =

Railway station in Uttar Pradesh, India

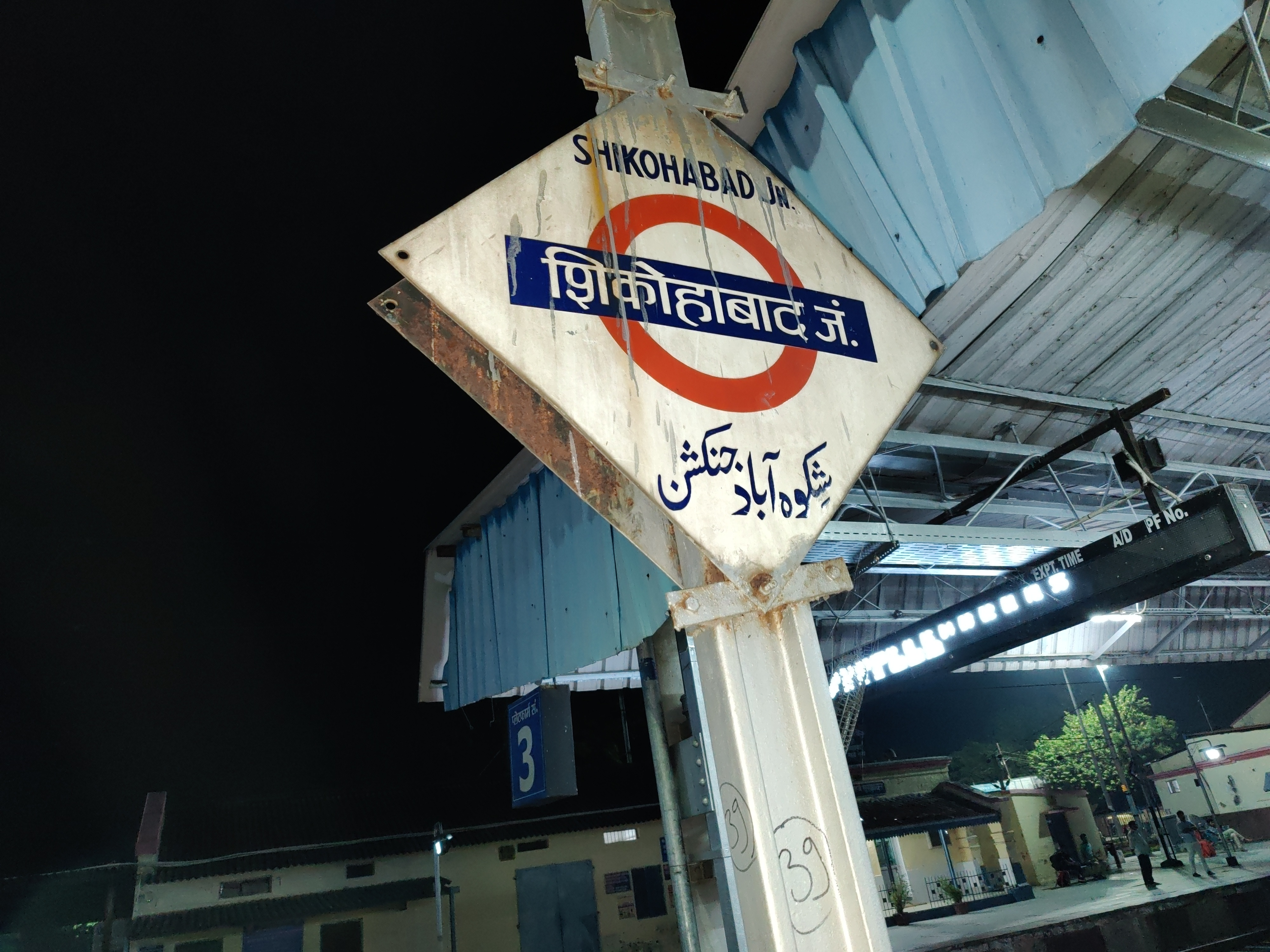
- Shikohabad railway station board on platform 4

General information
- Location: Shikohabad, Uttar Pradesh; India
- Coordinates: 27°05′10″N 78°34′31″E
- Elevation: 166 metres (545 ft)
- System: Indian Railways junction station
- Owner: Indian Railways
- Operator: North Central Railways
- Line: Kanpur–Delhi section: Shikohabad–Farrukhabad line
- Platforms: 4

Construction
- Structure type: Standard on ground
- Parking: Yes
- Cycle facilities: No

Other information
- Status: Functioning
- Station code: SKB
- Zone(s): North Central Railway zone
- Division(s): Prayagraj

History
- Opened: 1865-66
- Electrified: 1971–72
- Former names: East Indian Railway Company
Location
- Location within India Location within Uttar Pradesh

Shikohabad Junction railway station is on the Kanpur-Delhi section of Howrah–Delhi main line and Howrah–Gaya–Delhi line. It is located in Firozabad district in the Indian state of Uttar Pradesh. It serves Shikohabad.

== History ==
Through trains started running on the East Indian Railway Company's Howrah–Delhi line in 1866.

A branch line was opened from Shikohabad to Mainpuri in 1905 and extended to Farrukhabad in 1906.

== Electrification ==
The Panki–Tundla sector was electrified in 1971–72.

== See also ==
- Firozabad railway station
- Tundla Junction railway station
- Mainpuri railway station
- Etawah Junction railway station
- Udi Mor Junction railway station

Preceding station	Indian Railways	Following station
Kaurara towards ?	North Central Railway zone Kanpur–Delhi section	Makkhanpur towards ?
Terminus	North Central Railway zone Shikohabad–Farrukhabad branch line	Aaraon towards ?
