= Firozabad railway station =

Railway station in Uttar Pradesh, India

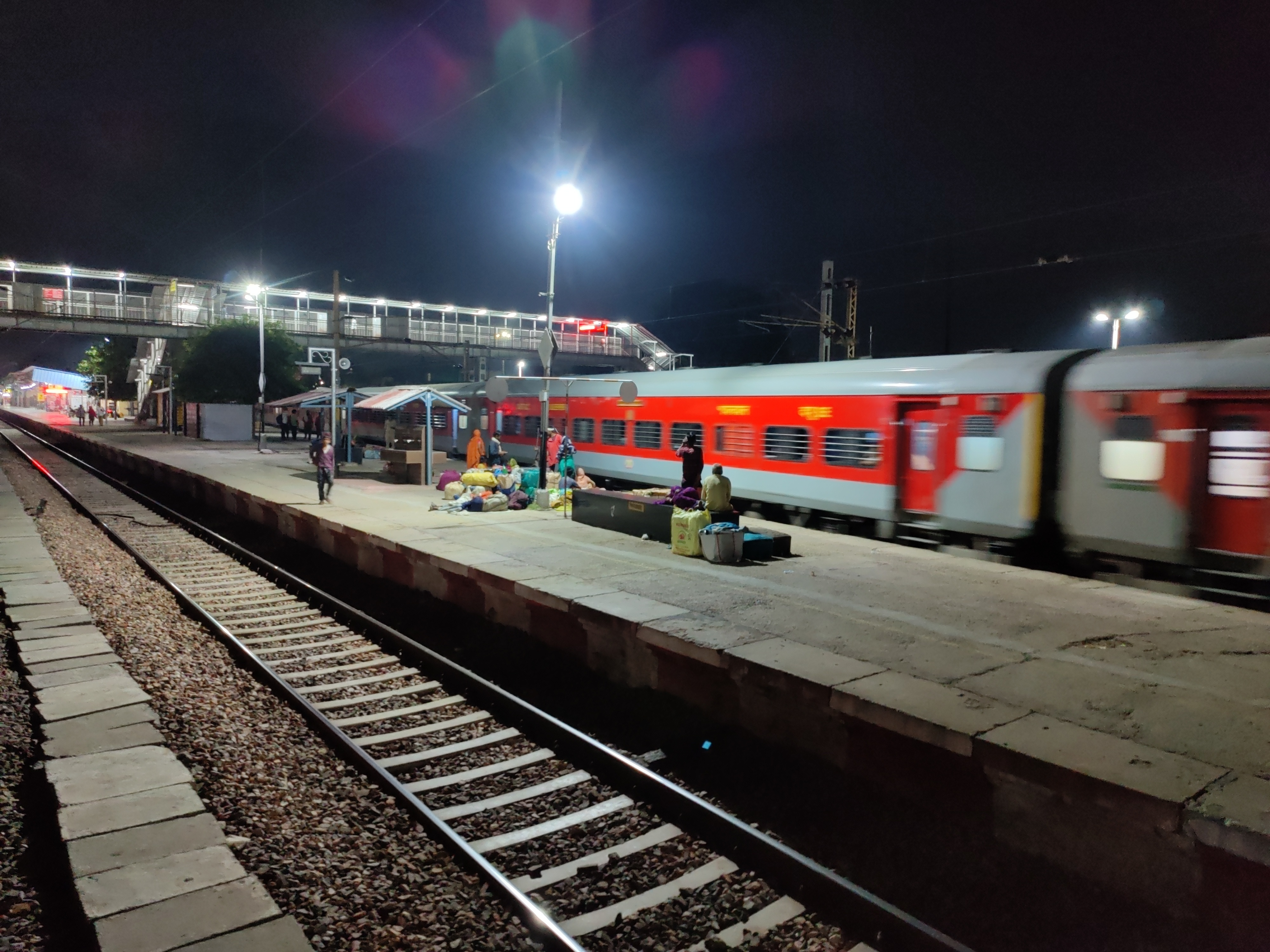
- Firozabad railway station

General information
- Location: NH 2, Firozabad, Uttar Pradesh; India
- Coordinates: 27°08′51″N 78°23′13″E
- Elevation: 163 metres (535 ft)
- System: Indian Railways station
- Owner: Indian Railways
- Operator: North Central Railway
- Line: Kanpur–Delhi section
- Platforms: 4

Construction
- Structure type: Standard on ground
- Parking: No
- Cycle facilities: No

Other information
- Status: Functioning
- Station code: FZD
- Division(s): Prayagraj

History
- Opened: 1865-66
- Electrified: 1971–72
- Former names: East Indian Railway Company
Location
- Location within Uttar Pradesh

Firozabad railway station is on the Delhi-kanpur section of Delhi-Howarah Main line and Howrah–Gaya–Delhi line. It is located in Firozabad district in the Indian state of Uttar Pradesh. It serves Firozabad.

== History ==
Through trains started running on the East Indian Railway Company's Howrah–Delhi line in 1866.

== Trains ==
- 20801/02 Magadh Express
- 19037/38 Avadh Express
- 14217/18 Unchahar Express
- 15483/84 Mahananda Express
- 12311/12 Kalka Mail
- 18101/02 Muri Express
- 12419/20 Gomti Express
- 14163/64 Sangam Express
- 13483/84 Farakka Express (via Faizabad)
- 15707/08 Amrapali Express
- 14723/24 Kalindi Express
- 12875/76 Neelachal Express
- 12395/96 Ziyarat Express
- 18631/32 Ranchi–Ajmer Garib Nawaz Express
- 13007/08 Udyan Abha Toofan Express
- 12179/08 Lucknow–Agra Fort Intercity Express

== Railway administration ==
This section is under the administrative control of a Junior/Senior Scale officer generally designated as Assistant Divisional Engineer headquartered at Firozabad. This section falls under the Prayagraj Division of North Central Railway Zone headquartered at Prayagraj. ADEN/DEN is assisted by a Permanent Way Supervisor and Works Supervisor generally designated as SSE/P-Way or SSE/Works. The maintenance of all the track and works comes under administrative control of ADEN/DEN. Generally a Group-'A' officer of Engineering Services Examination is posted at this post.

The tenures of various officers posted as Assistant Divisional Engineer and/or Divisional Engineers at Firozabad is as summarised below:

| S. No. | Name | Post | From (DD-MM-YYYY) | To (DD-MM-YYYY) |
|---|---|---|---|---|
| 1 | Shri N. S. Chouhan | Assistant Engineer | 01-01-1990 | 08-04-1991 |
| 2 | Shri Arvind Kumar Singh | Assistant Engineer | 09-04-1991 | 18-02-1993 |
| 3 | Shri Ravindra Kumar Goyal, IRSE | Assistant Engineer | 19-02-1993 | 28-02-1994 |
| 4 | Shri Ravindra Kumar Goyal, IRSE | Divisional Engineer | 01-03-1994 | 16-07-1994 |
| 5 | Shri Anurag, IRSE | Assistant Engineer | 16-07-1994 | 31-12-1996 |
| 6 | Shri Anurag, IRSE | Divisional Engineer | 31-12-1996 | 14-06-1997 |
| 7 | Shri K. P. Singh | Divisional Engineer | 14-06-1997 | 13-04-1998 |
| 8 | Shri Hirendra Singh Rana, IRSE | Assistant Engineer | 13-04-1998 | 07-02-1999 |
| 9 | Shri Hirendra Singh Rana, IRSE | Divisional Engineer | 08-02-1999 | 21-05-1999 |
| 10 | Shri Anil Kumar | Assistant Engineer | 21-05-1999 | 25-05-2001 |
| 11 | Shri Anil Kumar | Divisional Engineer | 25-05-2001 | 21-02-2002 |
| 12 | Shri Nand Ram, IRSE | Assistant Engineer | 21-02-2002 | 22-02-2002 |
| 13 | Shri Nand Ram, IRSE | Divisional Engineer | 22-02-2002 | 22-06-2002 |
| 14 | Shri Prakash Chandra Vyas | Assistant Divisional Engineer | 22-06-2002 | 20-03-2004 |
| 15 | Shri Neeraj Bhandari, IRSE | Assistant Divisional Engineer | 20-03-2004 | 03-02-2006 |
| 16 | Shri Neeraj Bhandari, IRSE | Divisional Engineer | 04-02-2006 | 21-03-2007 |
| 17 | Shri Aashish Srivastava | Assistant Divisional Engineer | 21-03-2007 | 21-01-2009 |
| 18 | Shri Aashish Srivastava | Divisional Engineer | 22-01-2009 | 02-03-2009 |
| 19 | Shri S. S. Meena | Assistant Divisional Engineer | 02-03-2009 | 24-06-2009 |
| 20 | Shri Shailendra Kumar, IRSE | Assistant Divisional Engineer | 24-06-2009 | 18-10-2011 |
| 21 | Shri Piyush Kumar Mishra, IRSE | Assistant Divisional Engineer | 18-10-2011 | 07-10-2013 |
| 22 | Shri Sudhir Kumar, IRSE | Assistant Divisional Engineer | 07-10-2013 | 18-03-2016 |
| 23 | Shri Sudhir Kumar | Sr. Assistant Divisional Engineer | 18-03-2016 | 20-01-2017 |
| 24 | Shri Saurabh Singh, IRSE | Assistant Divisional Engineer | 20-01-2017 | 13-04-2019 |
| 25 | Shri U.V. Singh Yadav | Assistant Divisional Engineer | 13-04-2019 | 29-04-2022 |
| 26 | Shri Ankit Kumar Shukla, IRSE | Assistant Divisional Engineer | 29-04-2022 | 30-05-2024 |
| 27 | Shri Ankit Kumar Shukla, IRSE | Sr. Assistant Divisional Engineer | 30-05-2024 | 24-10-2024 |
| 28 | Shri Himanshu Shekhar Singh | Assistant Divisional Engineer | 24-10-2024 | Present |

== Electrification ==
The Panki–Tundla sector was electrified in 1971–72.

== Amenities ==
Firozabad railway station has one double-bedded non-AC retiring room. It also has a light refreshment stall and a book stall.

== See also ==
- Firozabad rail disaster

| Preceding station | Indian Railways | Following station |
|---|---|---|
| Hirangaon towards ? | North Central Railway zone Kanpur–Delhi section | Makkhanpur towards ? |
