= Jhinjhak railway station =

Railway Station

Coordinates: 26.5549°N 79.7347°E

Jhinjhak
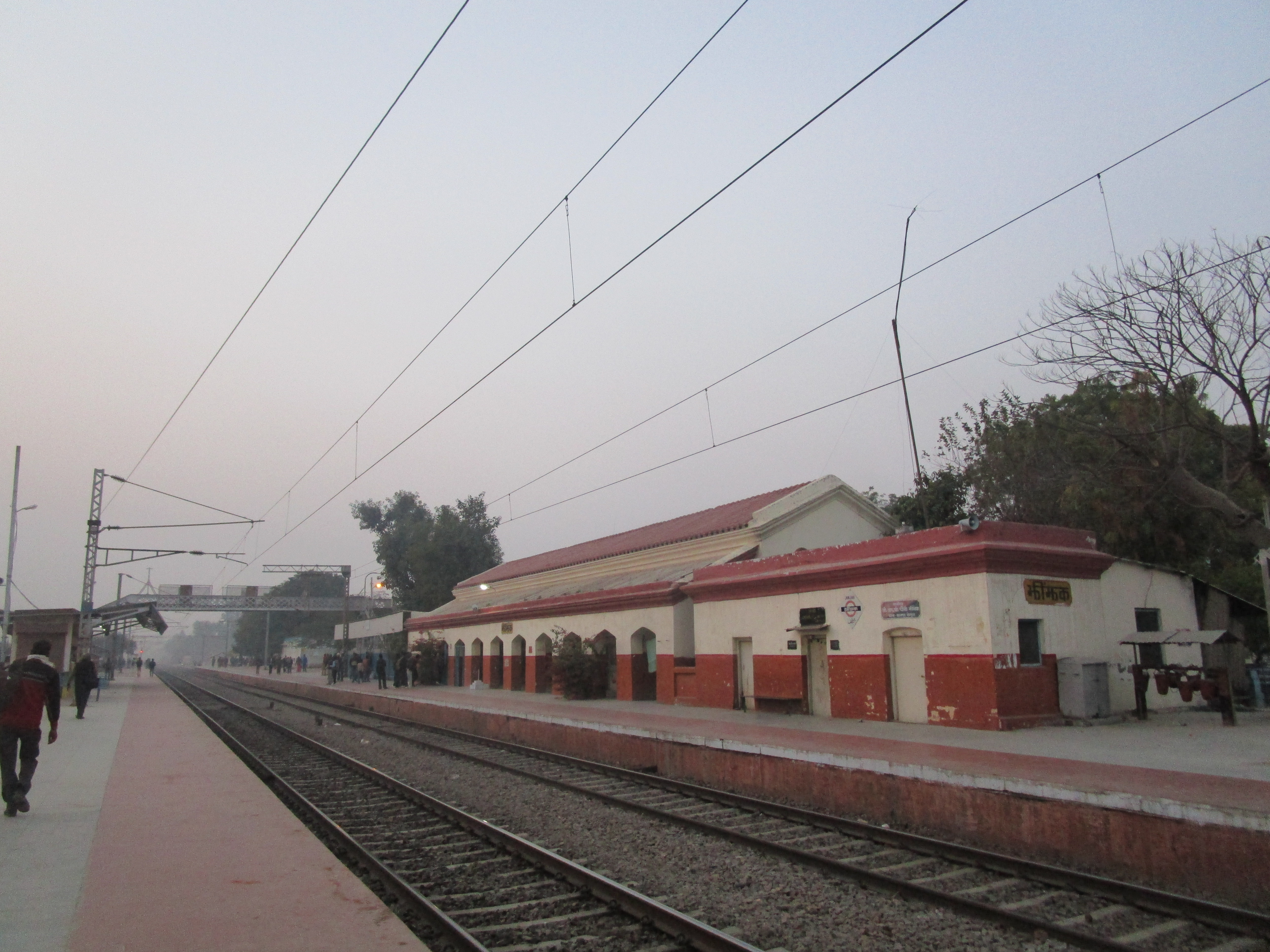

General information
- Location: Jhinjhak, Kanpur Dehat District, Uttar Pradesh; India
- Operator: Indian Railways
- Line: North Central Railway
- Platforms: 4
- Tracks: 4 Electrified
- Train operators: PRYJ
- Connections: Etawah Agra Rewa Dehradun Prayagraj Kanpur Jaipur Tundla Sambalpur Tatanagar Pt Deen Dayal Upadhyay Patna etc.

Construction
- Structure type: Yes
- Parking: Yes
- Cycle facilities: Yes

Other information
- Station code: JJK
- Fare zone: NCR
Location
- Location within India Location within Uttar Pradesh

Jhinjhak railway station is a station in Jhinjhak in Kanpur Dehat District, Uttar Pradesh, India. It lies on (NCR)/North Central Railway line. Nearest station to east is Rura at a distance 19 km and Kanpur is at 63 km. In the west nearest station is Phaphund and Etawah.

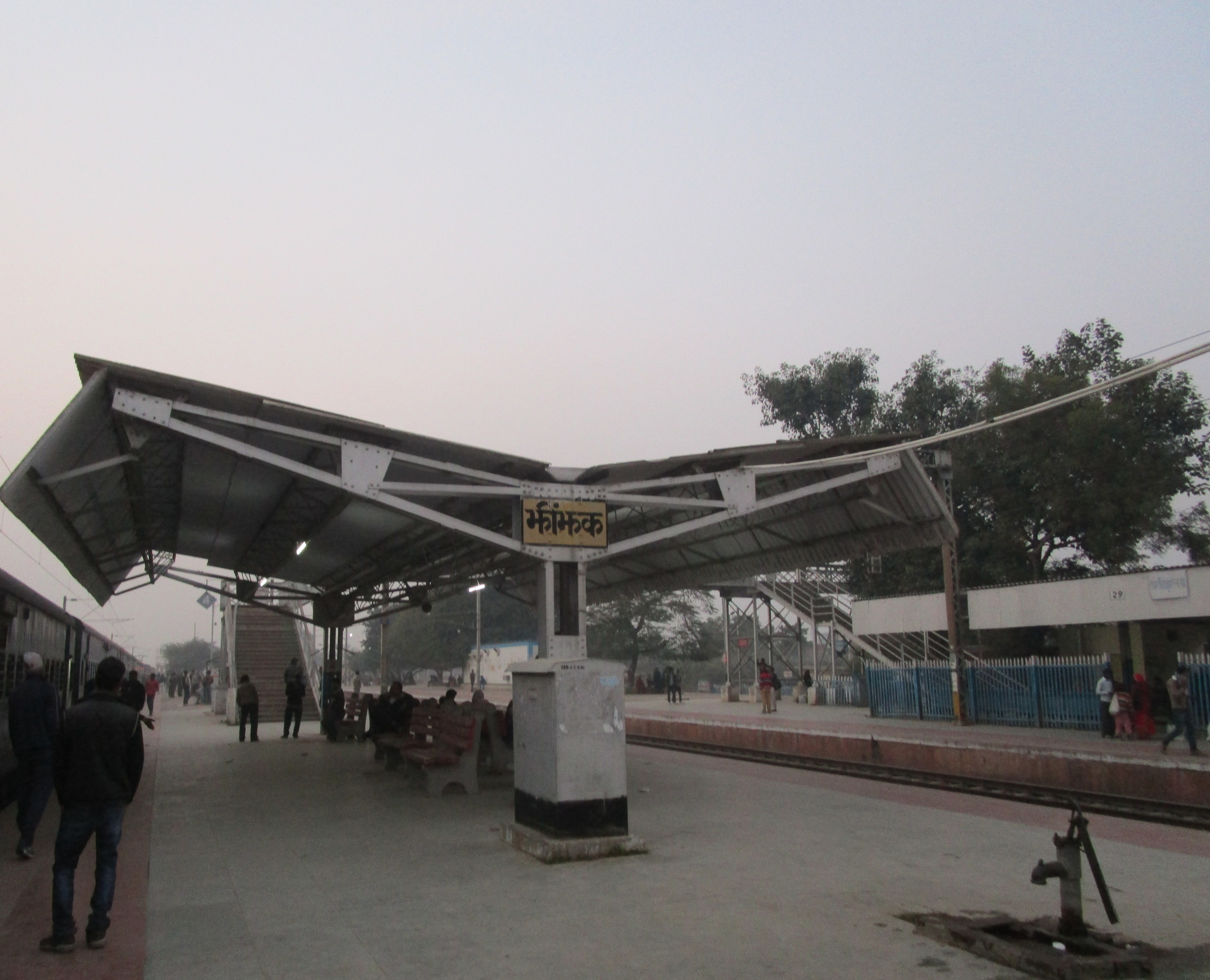
station platform

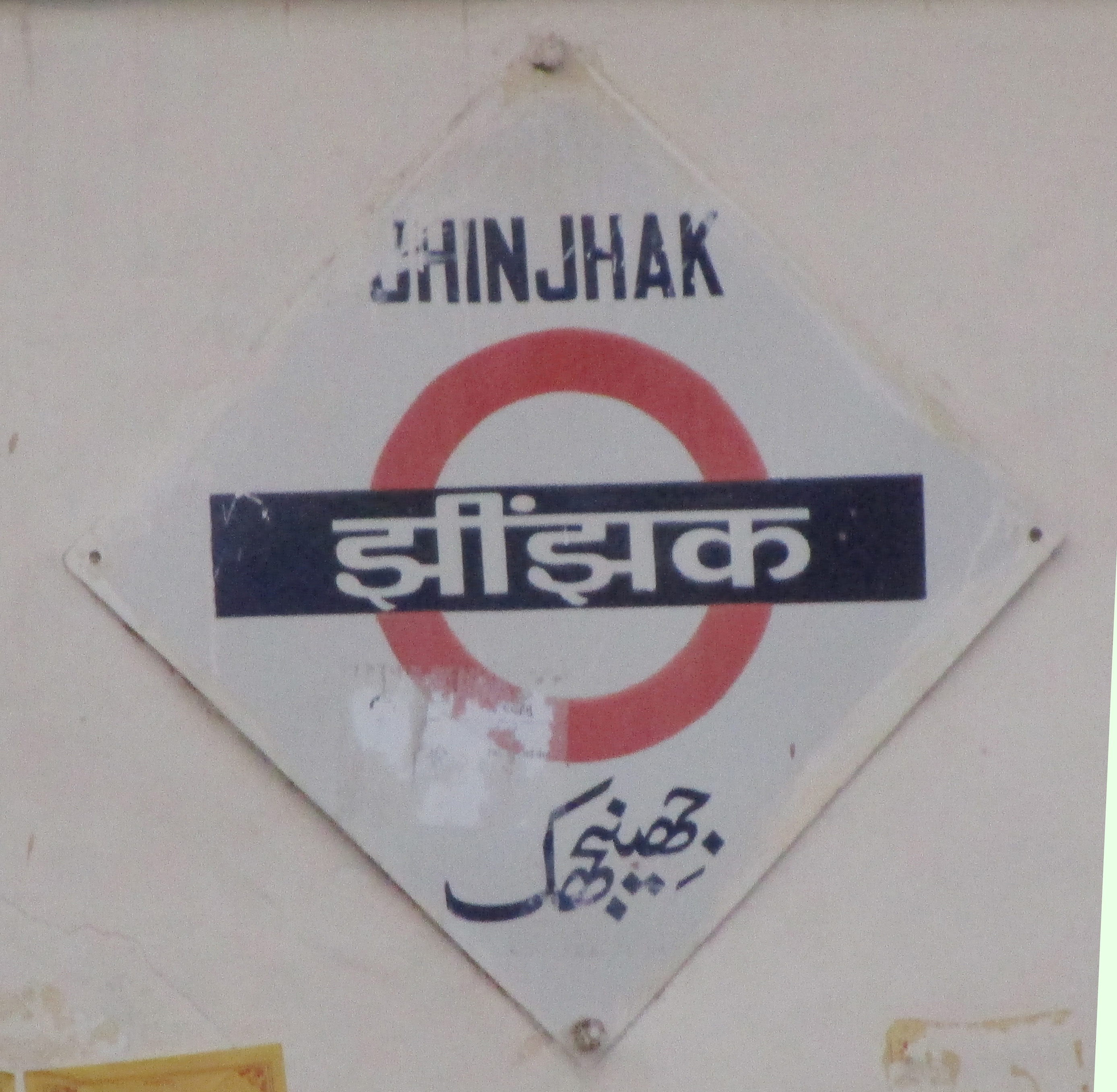
station sign
