= Loha Mandi =

Loha Mandi is the residential and commercial hub of the city of Agra, India.

== Accessibility ==
- Loha Mandi is about 7 km to the west of the city center and about 5 km from Idgah Bus Stand. The roads provide easy access into the township. It is also very close to St. John's Crossing and is one of the central parts of Agra. Local transport is easily available for Bodla, Shahganj, Bijli Ghar, Raja Ki Mandi Railway Station, St. John's College and Bhagwan Talkies Crossing.
- Raja Ki Mandi is the nearest railway station, and is about 2 km from the Loha Mandi crossing.
- Agra Airport lies about 7 km to the south of Loha Mandi.

== History ==
Loha Mandi was the hub of iron trade and also for iron-based product, hence the name Loha Mandi which literally means "place for iron trade". Even today the market has many shops that deals with iron. The market has expended and there are all shops selling all sorts of items.

== To do ==
For visitors, Loha Mandi is still essentially a shopping destination. There is a cloth market where people used to buy clothes at. There is also a big vegetable market where people come to buy vegetables from nearby places. There is also a leading educational publication in its bagh ram sahai area namely Navyug Publications Jaipur House (a store named after a famous palace in Delhi) and Shahganj (named after a city) are popular destinations where leather and marble products are available.

== See also ==
- Raja Ki Mandi
- Sadar Bazaar, Agra
