= IGDA (disambiguation) =

IGDA is an acronym referring to the International Game Developers Association.

IGDA may also refer to:

- Interstitial granulomatous dermatitis with arthritis, a skin condition
- Idgah, Uttar Pradesh, a location in India
- Terminal 1 IGI Airport metro station, Delhi, India, by Delhi Metro station code

== See also ==
- IDGAF (disambiguation)
- Idgah (disambiguation)
