= Idgah (disambiguation) =

Idgah or eidgah is an open-air enclosure reserved for Eid prayers.

It may also refer to:

- Idgah (short story), Hindi-language short story by Indian writer Premchand
- Idgah, Uttar Pradesh, a neighbourhood in Agra, Uttar Pradesh, India
  - Idgah Bus Stand, in Agra, Uttar Pradesh, India
  - Idgah railway station, southwest of Agra, Uttar Pradesh, India
- Eidgah, Madannapet, eidgah in Hyderabad, India
- Kheri Eidgah, eidgah and mosque in Kheri, Uttar Pradesh, India
- Eidgah Shah-i-Hamdan, eidgah in Srinagar, Jammu and Kashmir, India
- Purani Idgah, eidgah in Hyderabad, India
- Eidgah Assembly constituency, Jammu and Kashmir Legislative Assembly, India
- Id Gah Mosque, in Kabul, Afghanistan
- Id Kah Mosque, in Kashgar, Xinjiang, China

== See also ==
- Hubli Idgah Maidan dispute
