= Dr. Ambedkar Chowk metro station =

Metro station in Uttar Pradesh, India

Dr. Ambedkar Chowk डॉ. अंबेडकर चौक

General information
- Location: 52GC+4X7, Agra Fort, Rakabganj, Agra, Uttar Pradesh - 282001; India
- System: Agra Metro
- Owner: Uttar Pradesh Metro Rail Corporation
- Operator: Uttar Pradesh Metro Rail Corporation
- Line: Yellow Line
- Platforms: 2 (2 island platform)
- Tracks: 2

Construction
- Structure type: Underground, Double track
- Platform levels: 1
- Parking: Available

History
- Opened: 6 March 2024

Services
Preceding station	Agra Metro	Following station
Mankameshwar towards Jama Masjid	Yellow Line	Taj Mahal towards Taj East Gate
Location

Dr. Ambedkar Chowk metro station, formerly called Agra Fort is the under-ground station of the Yellow Line of the Agra Metro. It provides connectivity with Agra Fort. This station is owned by the Uttar Pradesh Metro Rail Corporation (UPMRC), and was opened to the public on 6 March 2024.

== Station layout ==
G	Ground level	Exit/Entrance
L1	Concourse	Customer Service, Shops, Vending machine, ATMs
L2; Platforms	Platform 2 Westbound	Towards ← Mankameshwar; Next Station: Mankameshwar
L2; Platforms	Island platform | Doors will open on the right
L2; Platforms	Platform 1 Eastbound	Towards → Taj East Gate; Next Station: Taj Mahal
L2

== Entry/Exits ==
- Gate 1 - Ram Leela Maidan
