= Taj Mahal metro station =

Taj Mahal
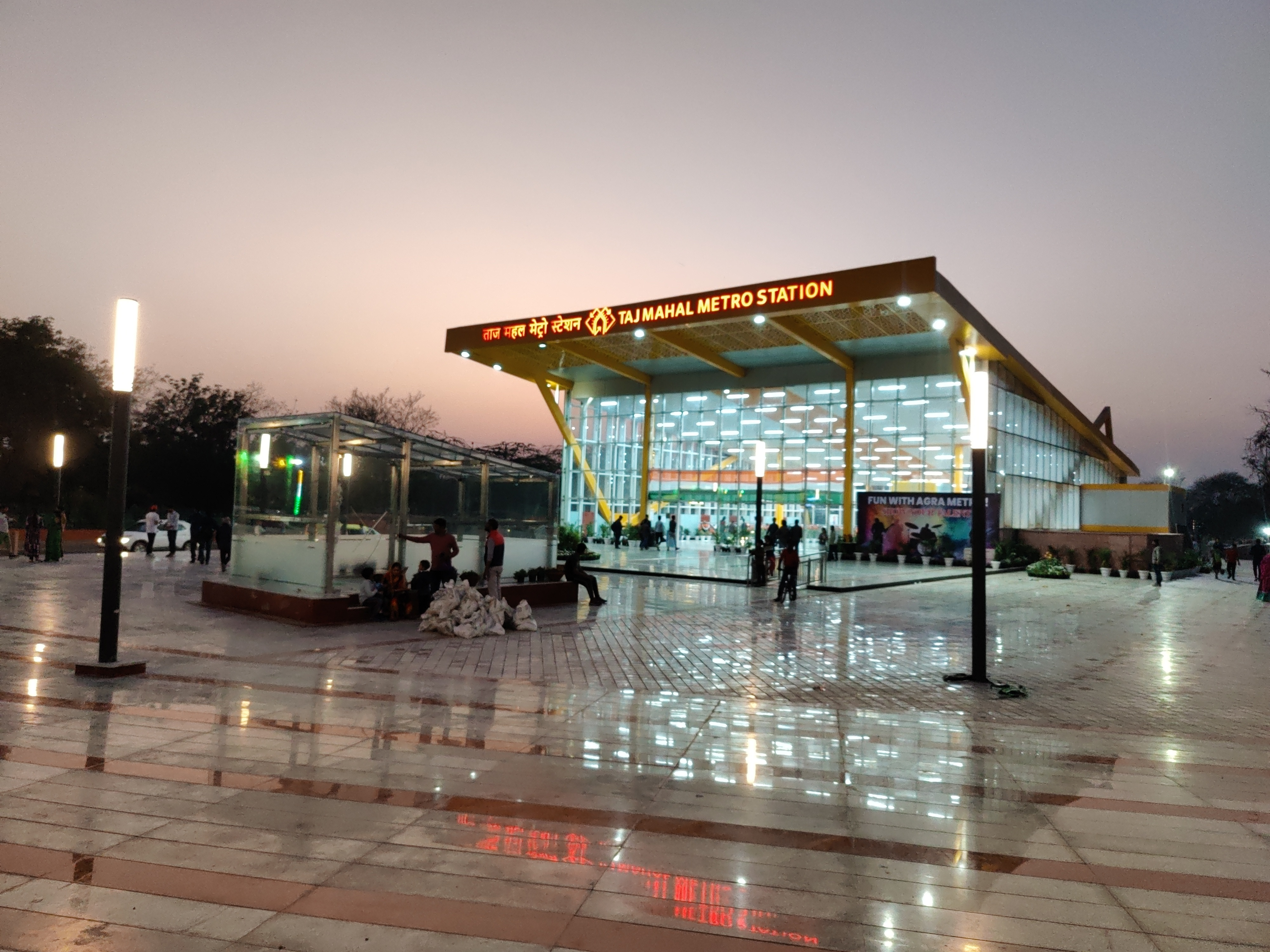
- Facade of the station

General information
- Location: Nai Basti, Khairati Tola, Agra, Uttar Pradesh - 282001; India
- Coordinates: 27.1684°N 78.0356°E
- System: Agra Metro
- Owner: Uttar Pradesh Metro Rail Corporation
- Operator: Uttar Pradesh Metro Rail Corporation
- Line: Yellow Line
- Platforms: 2 (2 island platform)
- Tracks: 2

Construction
- Structure type: Underground, Double track
- Platform levels: 1
- Parking: Available

History
- Opened: 6 March 2024

Services
| Preceding station | Agra Metro | Following station |
|---|---|---|
| Dr. Ambedkar Chowk towards Jama Masjid | Yellow Line | Fatehabad Road towards Taj East Gate |
Location

Taj Mahal metro station is the under-ground station of the Yellow Line of the Agra Metro. This station is owned by the Uttar Pradesh Metro Rail Corporation (UPMRC), and was opened to the public on 6 March 2024.

== Station layout ==
| G | Ground level | Exit/Entrance |
| L1 | Concourse | Customer Service, Shops, Vending machine, ATMs |
| L2; Platforms | Platform 2 Westbound | Towards ← Mankameshwar; Next Station: Dr. Ambedkar Chowk |
| L2; Platforms | Island platform | Doors will open on the right |
| L2; Platforms | Platform 1 Eastbound | Towards → Taj East Gate; Next Station: Fatehabad Road |
| L2 |

== Entry/Exits ==
- Gate 1 - Purani Mandi Chauraha
