= Raibha railway station =

Railway station in Uttar Pradesh, India

Raibha
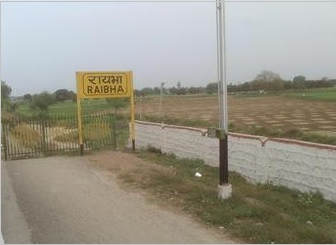
- Krishna Singh Thakur's Home

General information
- Location: Bichpuri, Agra district, Uttar Pradesh; India
- Coordinates: 27°11′N 77°53′E
- Elevation: 170 metres (560 ft)
- Operator: North Central Railway
- Line: Agra–Bandikui section

Construction
- Structure type: Standard (on ground station)
- Parking: Yes

Other information
- Status: Functioning
- Station code: RAI
- Zone(s): North Central Railway
- Division(s): Agra
Location
- Location within India Location within Uttar Pradesh

Raibha railway station (station code RAI) is a railway station in Bichpuri, Agra district, in the Indian state of Uttar Pradesh. The North Central Railway lists Raibha (RAI) in the Agra–Bandikui section of the Agra Division; the listing was last reviewed on 8 October 2026.

== See also ==
- North Central Railway zone
- Kiraoli
