= Railways in Agra =

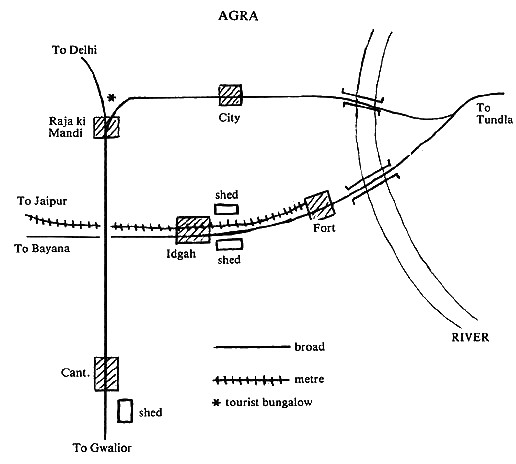
Railway Map of Agra (the line to Jaipur has meanwhile been converted to broad gauge)

Agra has a north–south broad gauge line intersecting an east–west broad gauge line. The crossing is around the Rui Ki Mandi area where the east west line passes under the North South line.

Two broad gauge lines come from Bharatpur and Bayana respectively. Both of these lines are single and electrified. These two lines converge just before Idgah Jn. and the common line continues up to Tundla Jn on New Delhi–Howrah main line.

== Railway Stations ==
Agra railway stations are:

=== In Agra ===
- Agra Cantt – North Central Railways
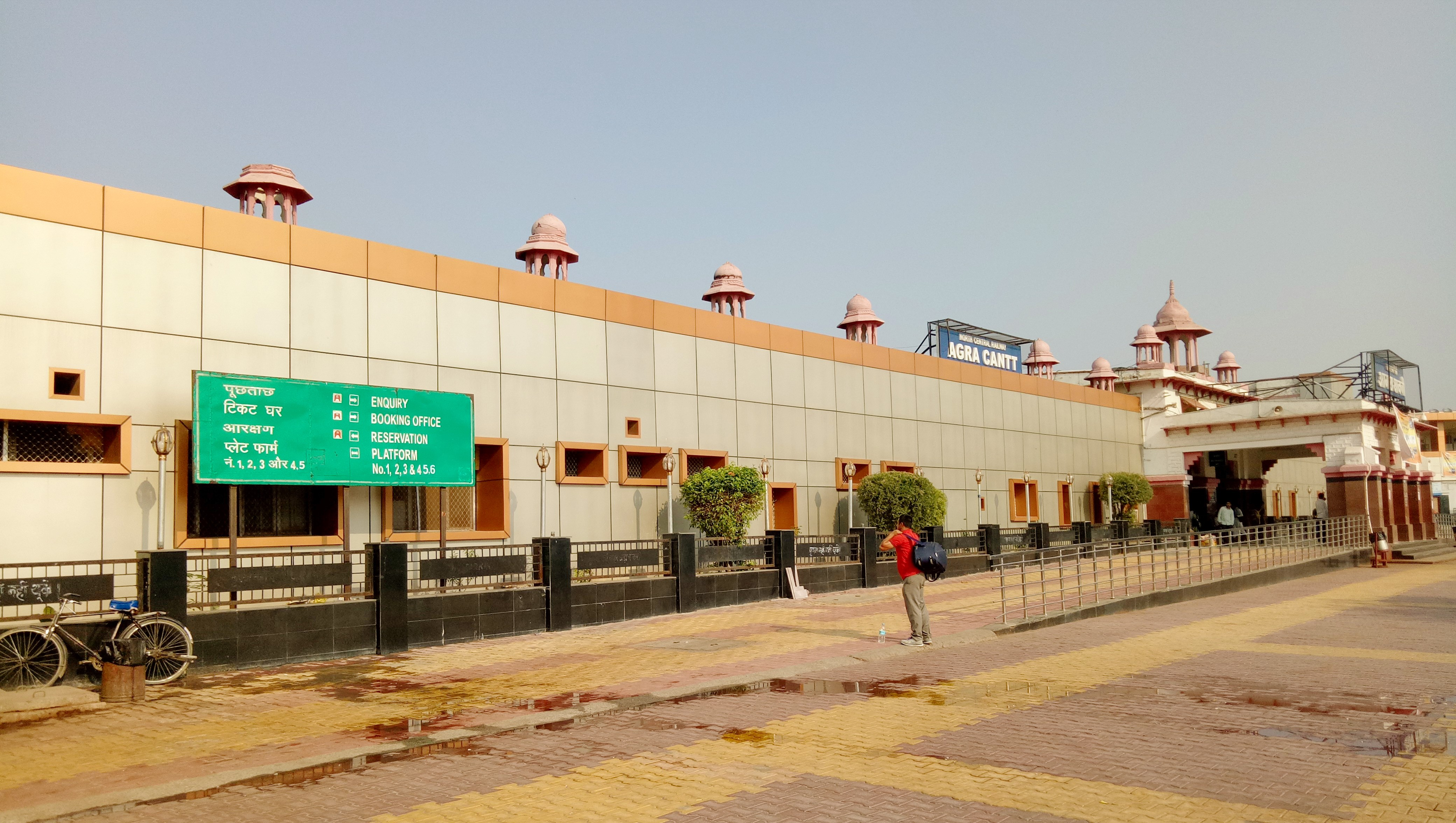
  Agra Cantt railway Station
- Raja ki Mandi – North Central Railways
- Agra Fort – North Central Railways
- Agra City – North Central Railways
- Idgah – North Central Railways
- Yamuna Bridge – North Central Railways
- Etmadpur – North Central Railways
- Kuberpur Railway Station
- Billochpura – North Central Railways
- Patholi – North Central Railways

=== Near Agra ===
- Tundla – 22 km from Agra.
- Mathura Junction – 50 km from Agra.
- Achhnera Junction – 27 km from Agra.

== Arriving ==
Agra is well connected to most of the major cities in India.

=== Towards Maharashtra and Madhya Pradesh ===
There are direct trains between Agra and Mumbai, but all of them take around 24 hours. It is much better to take August Kranti Rajdhani Express or the Garib Rath which take only around 16 hours from Mathura, which is one hour's drive from Agra.

=== Towards Kolkata and North East ===
There are direct trains from Agra Fort Railway Station to Kolkata, most of them pass through Tundla Junction, which is a 40-minute drive from Agra.

=== Towards Rajasthan ===
There are many trains which go to Jaipur and further westwards in Rajasthan. Most of them go via Bayana and Bharatpur.
