= Sadar Bazaar, Agra =

Sadar Bazaar
- locality, market
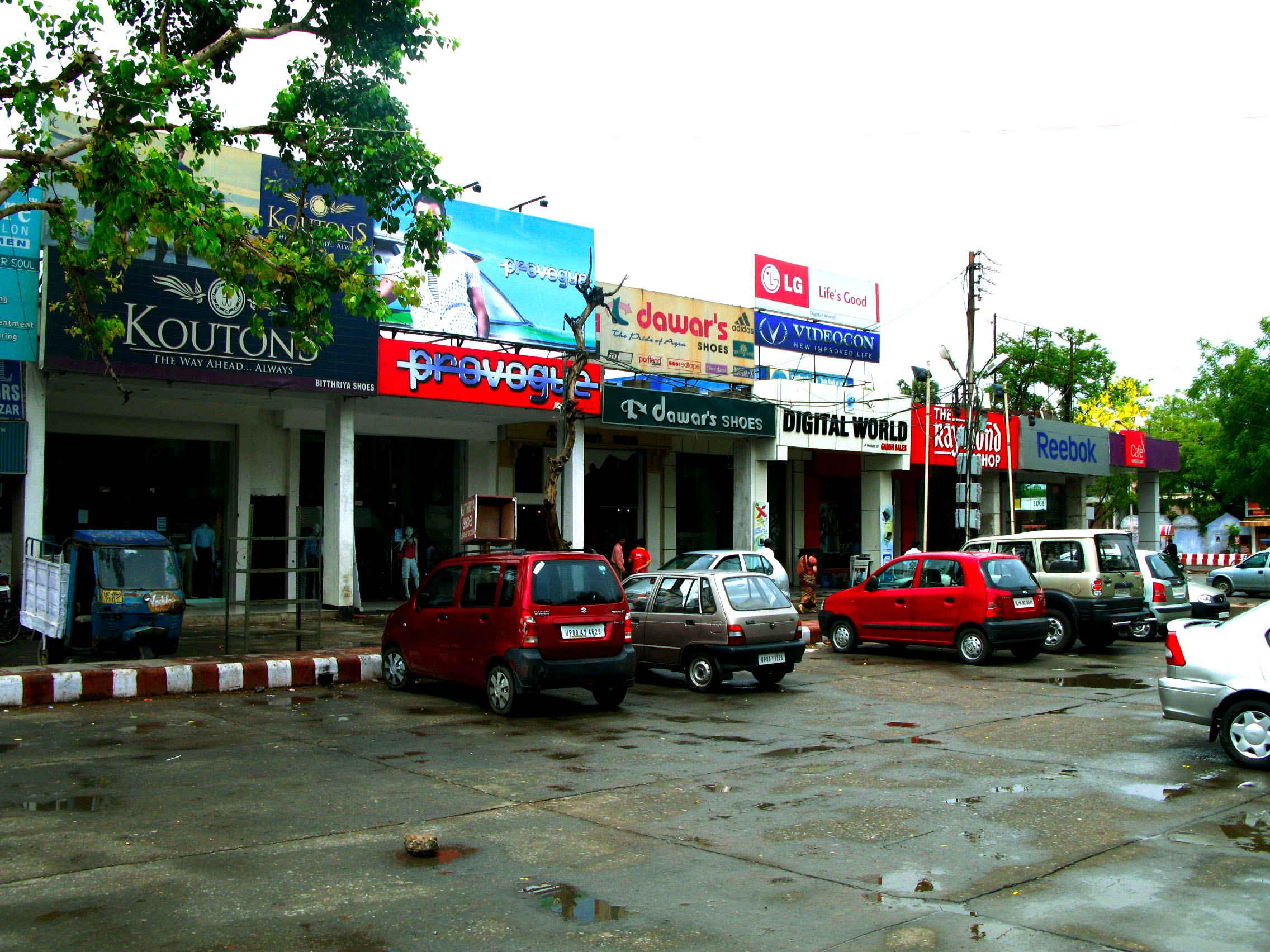
- Sadar Bazaar near Agra Cantonment

- Location in the Agra district
- Coordinates: 27.1559103°N 78.0012234°E
- Country: India
- State: Uttar Pradesh
- District: Agra
- Time zone: UTC+5:30 (IST)
- PIN: 282001

Sadar Bazaar is a popular shopping destination for tourists visiting Agra. It is located close to Agra Cantonment railway station and is in proximity to the Taj Mahal and Agra Fort.

== Shopping and facilities ==
With the Taj Mahal being a popular attraction for tourists, thousands of people from different parts of India as well as from foreign countries come to Agra. Sadar Bazaar is the place most of them come to for shopping. Shops in Sadar Bazaar sell leather products, petha (sweet), handicrafts and garments. The market sees heavy activity in the evenings, when the streets are filled with locals and foreigners alike.

The famous leather shop of Agra Taj Leather World is also situated at Sadar Bazaar.

Agra's famous Chaat Gali is also in Sadar Bazaar, where people can taste a variety of gol gappa, chaats, and many more forms of local street food.

St George's Cathedral, formerly an Anglican church and now part of the Church of North India, is located near the Eklavya sports stadium in Sadar Bazaar.

== See also ==
- Agra
- Bazaar
- Hawker centre (Asia) a centre where street food is sold
- Haat bazaar
- Loha Mandi
- Marketplace
- Pan Bazaar
- Peddler
- Raja ki mandi
- Retail
- Sadar Bazar Stadium
- Street vendor
- Street food
