= Agra Cantonment railway station =

Main railway station in the Indian city of Agra

Agra Cantonment Railway Station Agra Cantt
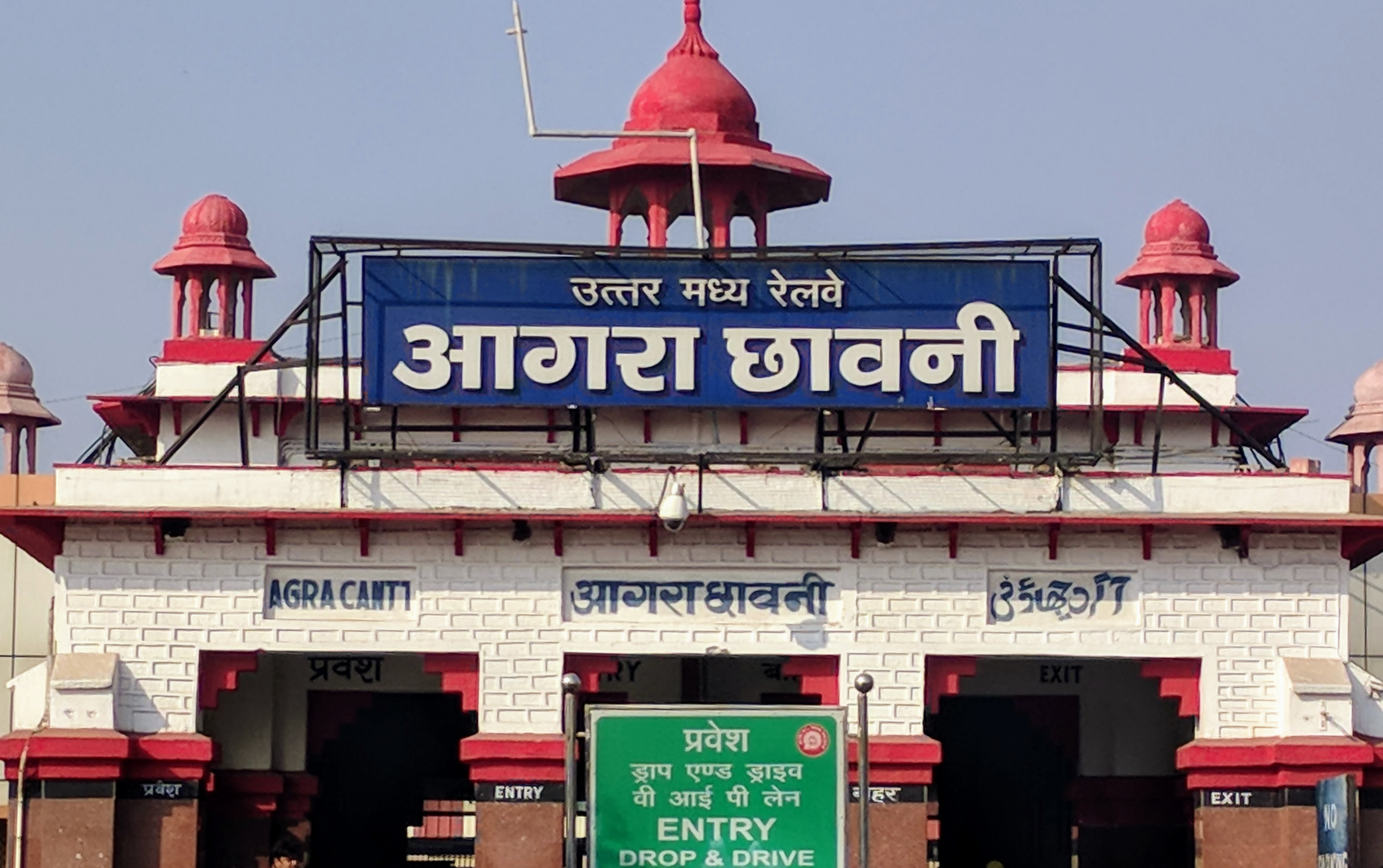

General information
- Location: Agra, Uttar Pradesh; India
- Coordinates: 27°9′32″N 77°59′26″E
- Elevation: 174 metres (571 ft)
- System: Indian Railways station
- Owner: Indian Railways
- Operator: North Central Railway zone
- Lines: New Delhi–Chennai main line, Agra–Bhopal section
- Platforms: 6
- Tracks: 21
- Connections: Blue Line Agra Cantt. (under-construction)

Construction
- Structure type: At grade
- Parking: Available
- Cycle facilities: No
- Accessible: Available

Other information
- Status: Functional
- Station code: AGC
- Zone(s): North Central Railway
- Division(s): Agra

History
- Opened: 1904
- Electrified: 1982–85
Location
- Location within Uttar Pradesh

Agra Cantt (station code: AGC) is the main railway station in the Indian city of Agra. It is located near the Sadar Bazaar towards the southwest of the city. It lies on the main Delhi–Chennai line and one of the Delhi–Mumbai lines.

== History ==
The 1,000 mm (3 ft 3 3/8 in)-wide metre-gauge Delhi–Bandikui and Bandikui–Agra lines of Rajputana State Railway were opened in 1874. The Agra–Jaipur line was converted to 5 ft 6 in (1,676 mm) broad gauge in 2005.

The broad-gauge Agra–Delhi chord was opened in 1904.

== Electrification ==
The Faridabad–Mathura–Agra section was electrified in 1982–85, Tundla–Yamuna Bridge in 1988–89 and Yamuna Bridge–Agra in 1990–91.

== The station ==
Agra Cantt railway station has 6 platforms:

- Platform 1 = 540 meters
- Platform 2 = 598 meters
- Platform 3 = 573 meters
- Platform 4 = 735 meters
- Platform 5 = 631 meters
- Platform 6 = 320 meters
- Platform 7 = Proposed on 24 Jan 2018

The fastest train in India, Gatimaan Express, originates and terminates here. It was extended to Jhansi in April 2018.

== Passenger movement ==
Agra Cantonment is among the top hundred booking stations of Indian Railway.

1,34,26,890 Passengers Arrive at Agra Cantt per/year on an average.

== Amenities ==
Agra Cantt railway station has a tourist information counter, computerised reservation counters (Indrail Passes were available), waiting room, retiring room, vegetarian and non-vegetarian refreshment rooms, water coolers, water vending machines and book stall.

Taxis, auto-rickshaws, tempos and cycle-rickshaws are available for local movement. Idgah Bus Stand is nearby. Distance from Agra Cantt. railway station: Taj Mahal 5.7 km, Agra Fort 5.2 km, Sikandra 9.7 km, Fatehpur Sikri 38 km, Agra airport 3.6 km.

== Gallery ==
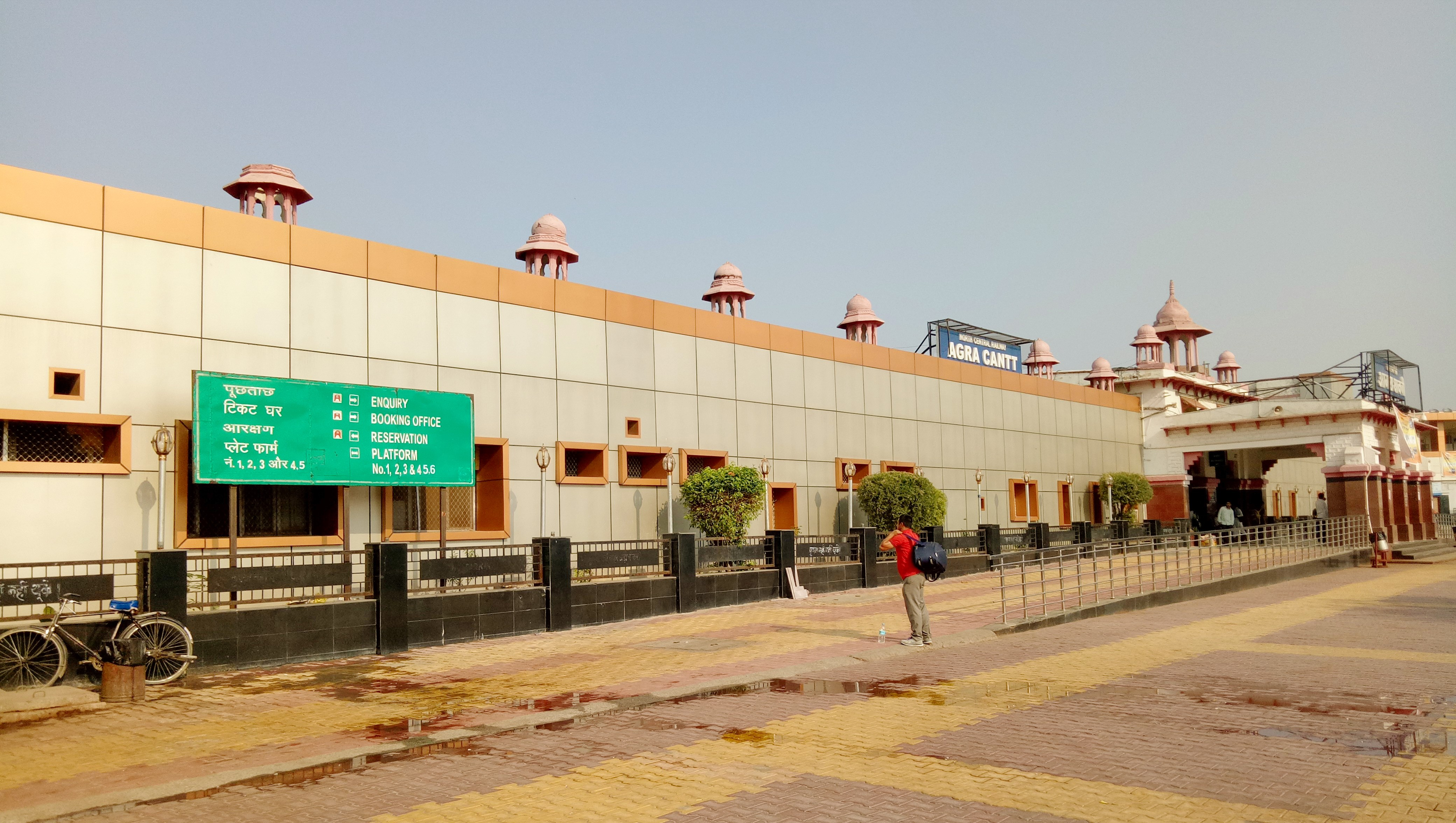
Railway Station View

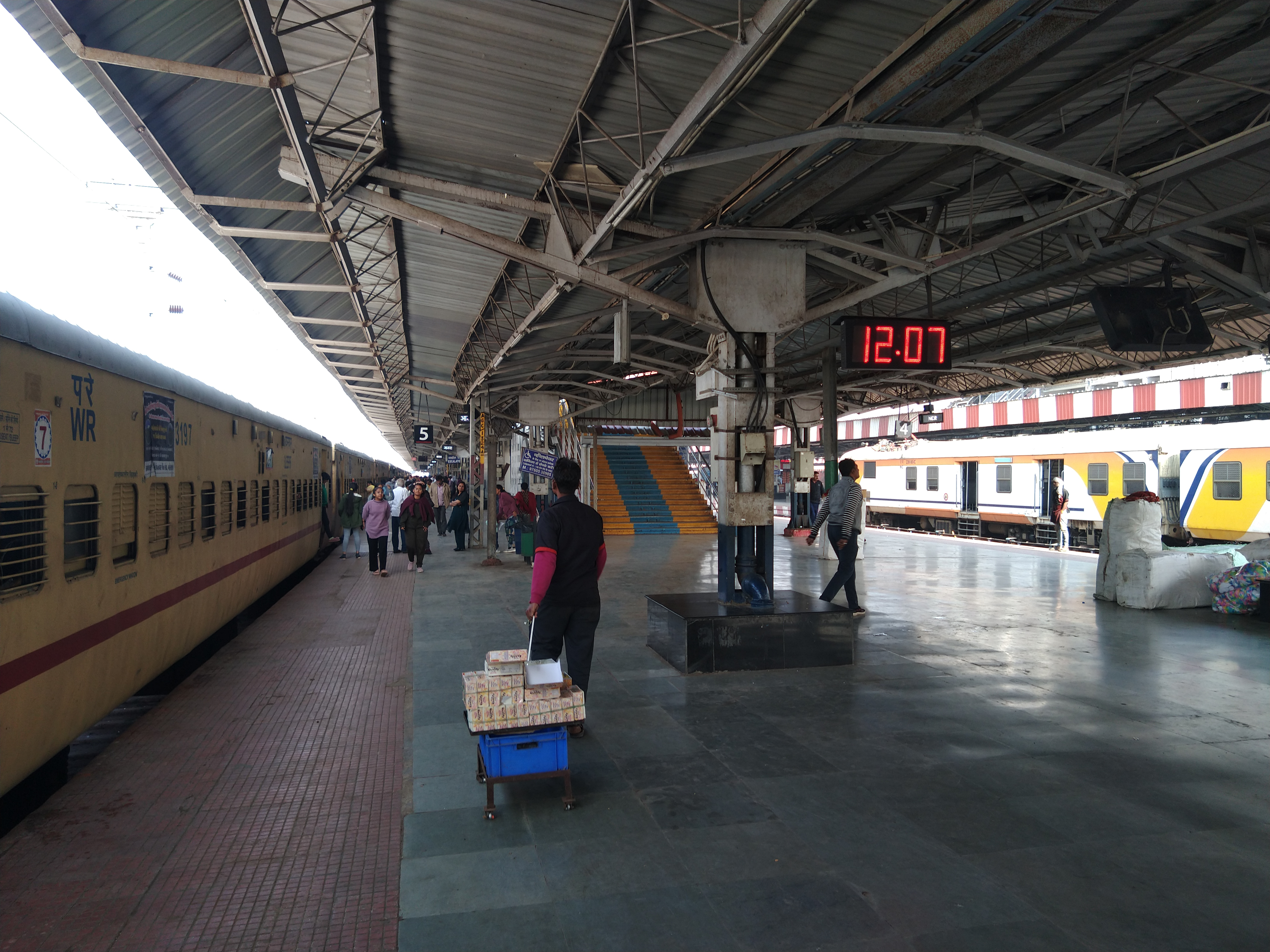
Platform

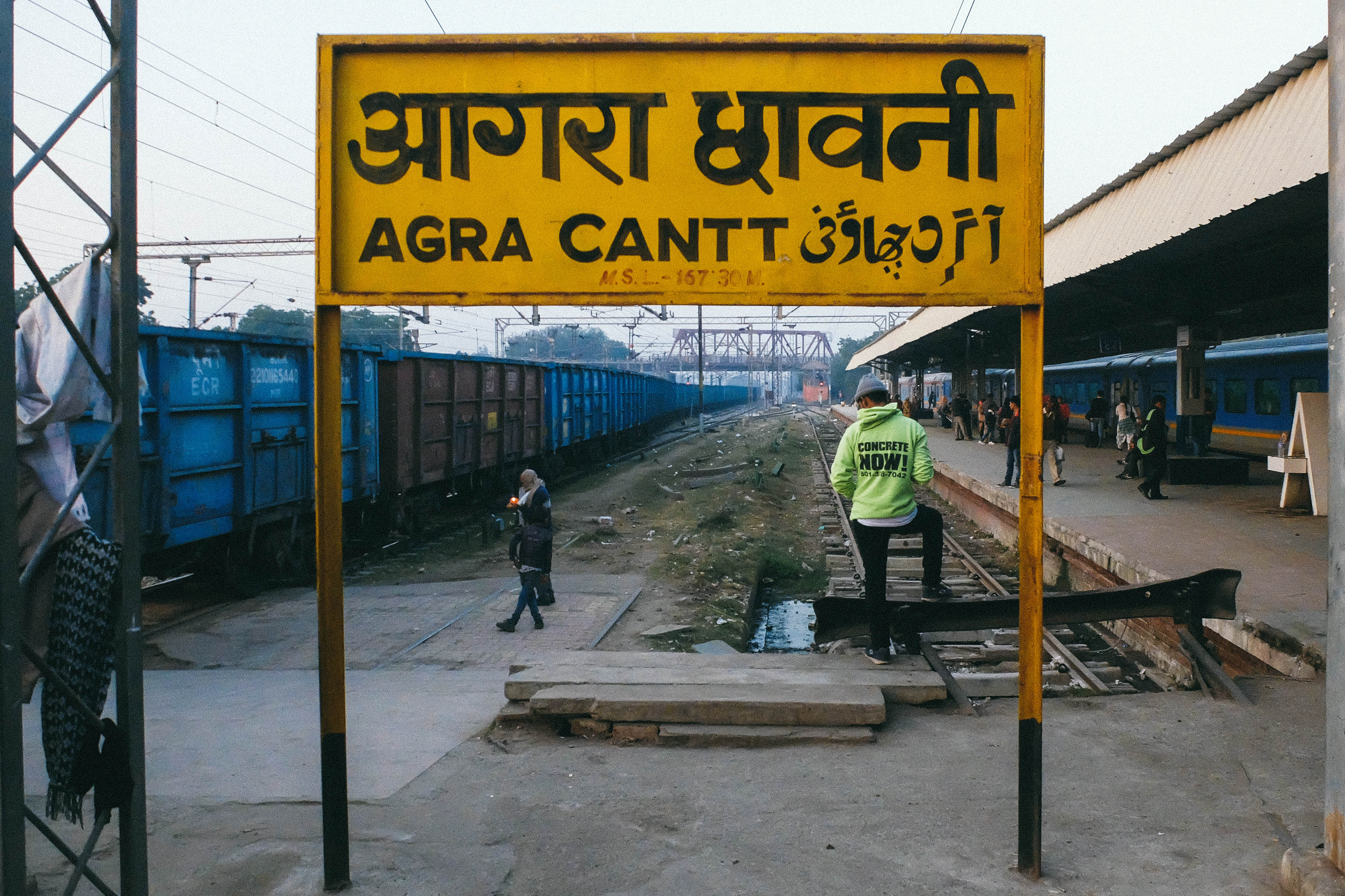
Sign board

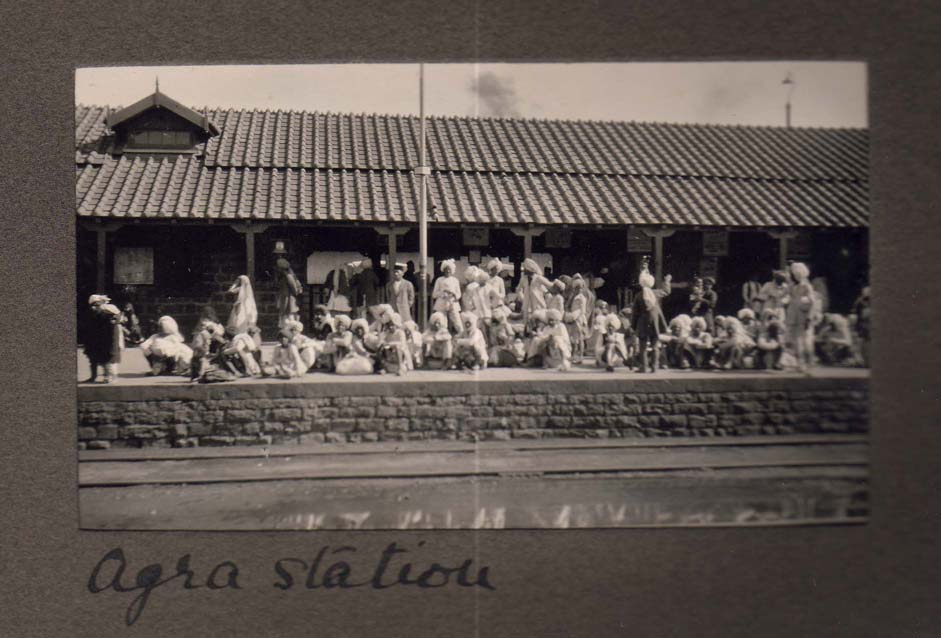
Station in 1920s

Preceding station	Indian Railways	Following station
Bhandai towards ?	North Central Railway zone Jhansi–Delhi line	Raja ki Mandi towards ?
Terminus	North Central Railway zone Agra–Bharatpur branch line	Bichpuri towards ?
Terminus	North Central Railway zone Agra–Bayana branch line	Pathauli towards ?
Terminus	North Central Railway zone Tundla–Agra line 1	Idgah towards ?
Terminus	North Central Railway zone Tundla–Agra line 2	Agra City towards ?
