= Yamuna Bridge railway station =

Railway station in Uttar Pradesh, India

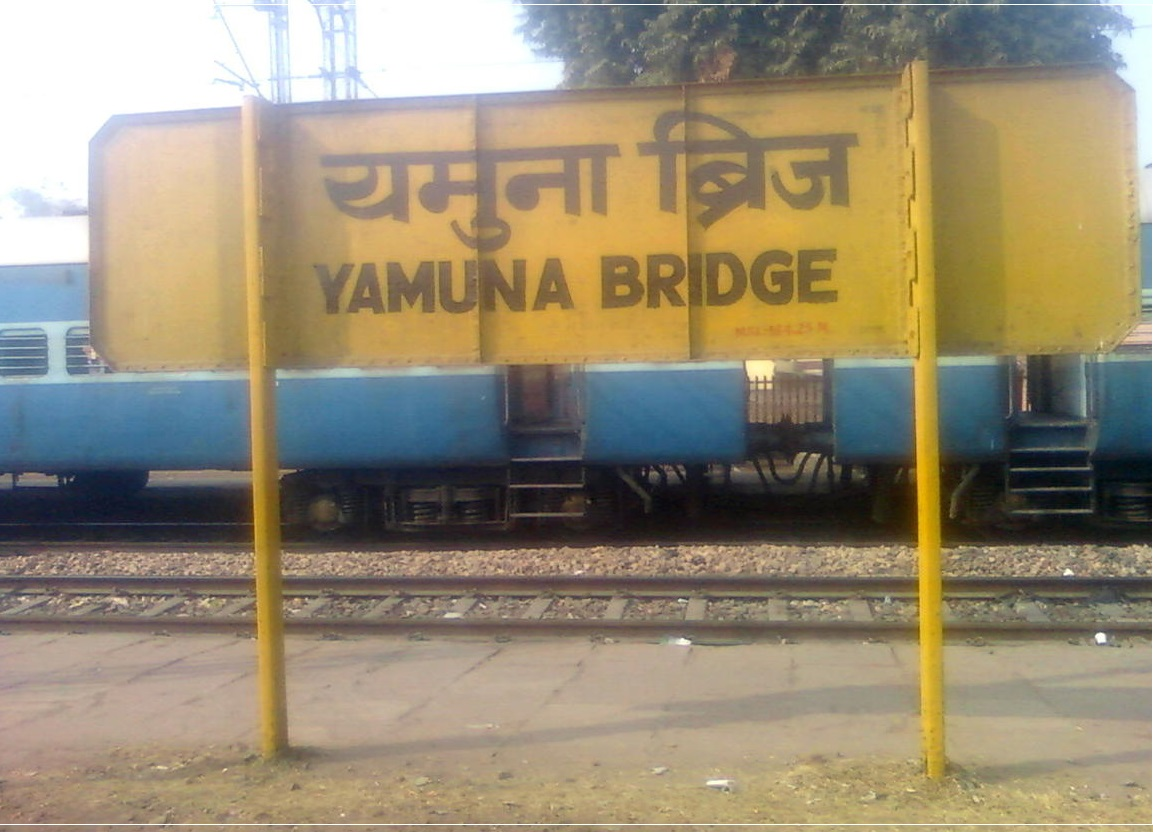

General information
- Location: Etmaddoula, Agra, Uttar Pradesh; India
- Coordinates: 27°11′32″N 78°02′21″E
- Elevation: 168 metres (551 ft)
- System: Indian Railways junction station
- Owner: Indian Railways
- Operator: North Central Railway
- Line: Tundla–Agra branch line
- Platforms: 3

Construction
- Structure type: Standard on ground
- Parking: No
- Cycle facilities: No

Other information
- Status: Functioning
- Station code: JAB
- Division(s): Agra

History
- Electrified: 1990–91
Location
- Location within India Location within Uttar Pradesh

Yamuna Bridge railway station is on the Tundla–Agra branch line. It is located in Agra district in the Indian state of Uttar Pradesh. It serves Etmaddoula and surrounding neighbourhoods in Agra.

== Overview ==
Agra, the 16–17th century capital of the Mughals, is home to monuments such as the Taj Mahal and Agra Fort. The Taj Mahal attracts 7-8 million tourists annually. About 0.8 million foreign tourists visit it.

== Trains ==
- Bareilly–Bandikui Passenger
- Agra–Tundla MEMU
- Etawah–Agra Cantonment MEMU
- Yamuna Bridge–Bayana Passenger
- Tundla–Agra Cantonment MEMU
- Haldighati Passenger
- Bandikui–Bareilly Passenger
- Agra Fort–Lucknow Junction Intercity Superfast
- Lucknow Junction–Agra Fort Intercity Superfast

== Electrification ==
Tundla–Yamuna Bridge section was electrified in 1998–99 and Yamuna Bridge–Agra in 1990–91.

Preceding station	Indian Railways	Following station
Chhalesar towards ?	North Central Railway zone Tundla–Agra branch line 1	Agra Fort towards ?
Chhalesar towards ?	North Central Railway zone Tundla–Agra branch line 2	Agra City towards ?
