= Raja ki mandi =

Area in Agra named after a ruler

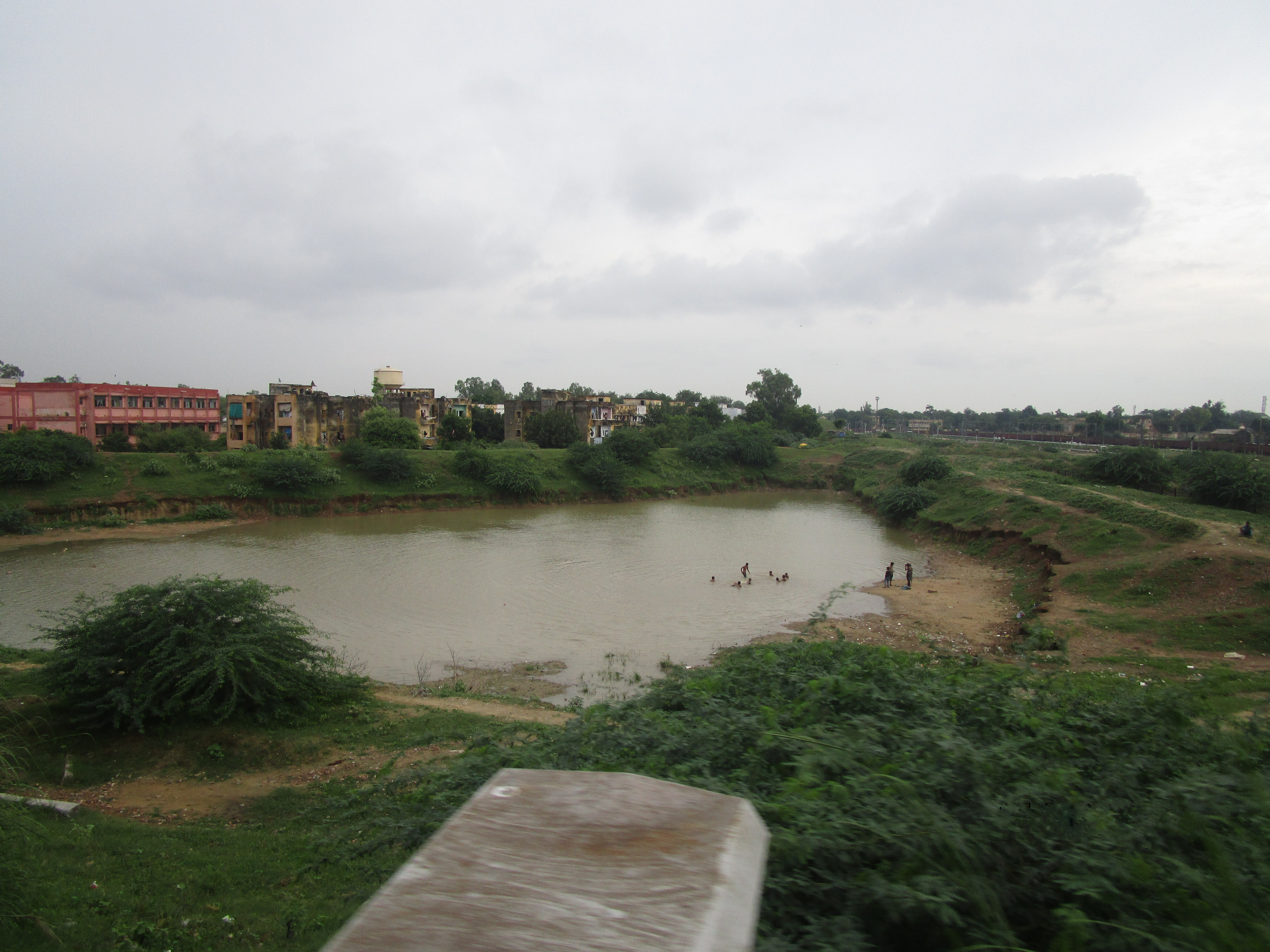
A lake at Raja ki mandi

Raja Ki Mandi (Hindi: राजा की मंडी) is named after a ruler of the place Raja Ram Vyas, it is an area in Agra with shops selling all sorts of clothes lining the streets. There is also a railway station at Raja Ki Mandi by the same name. There is a road "Raja Ram Vyas Marg" as well situated inside the market named after the ruler.

== Railway Station ==
Raja Ki Mandi Railway Station comes under North Central Railways on the Agra–Delhi Mainline. Here a line goes to Agra Cantonment Railway Station (North Central Railways) and Lucknow Railway Station.

== See also ==
- Railways in Agra
