= Mankameshwar metro station =

Mankameshwar मनकामेश्वर
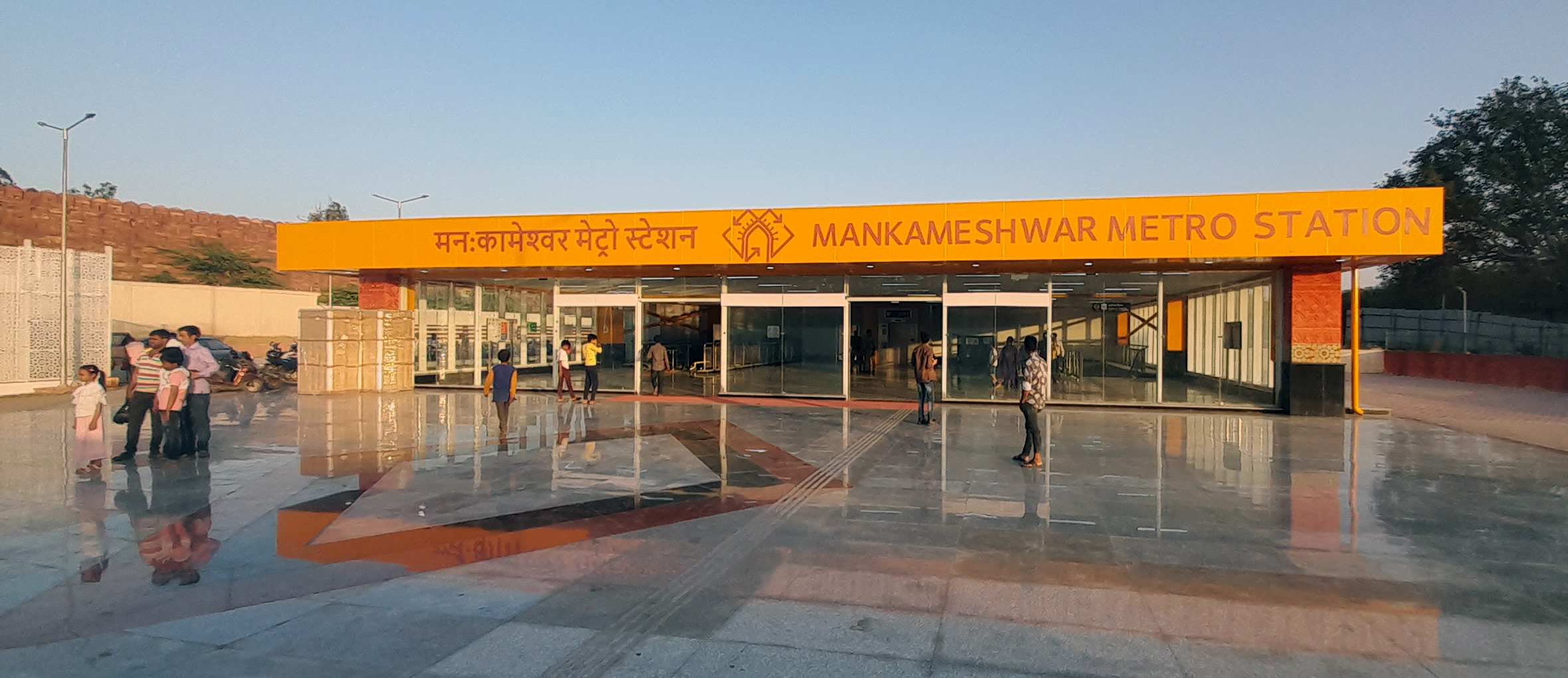

General information
- Location: Mantola Rd, Munda Para, Rakabganj, Agra, Uttar Pradesh - 282001; India
- Coordinates: 27.1775°N 78.0179°E
- System: Agra Metro
- Owner: Uttar Pradesh Metro Rail Corporation
- Operator: Uttar Pradesh Metro Rail Corporation
- Line: Yellow Line
- Platforms: 2 (2 island platform)
- Tracks: 2
- Connections: Agra Fort

Construction
- Structure type: Underground, Double track
- Platform levels: 1
- Parking: Available

History
- Opened: 6 March 2024

Services
Preceding station	Agra Metro	Following station
Terminus	Yellow Line	Taj Mahal towards Taj East Gate
Location

Mankameshwar metro station is the under-ground station of the Yellow Line of the Agra Metro. It provides connectivity with the Agra Fort railway station. This station is owned by the Uttar Pradesh Metro Rail Corporation (UPMRC), and was opened to the public on 6 March 2024.

== Station layout ==
G	Ground level	Exit/Entrance
L1	Concourse	Customer Service, Shops, Vending machine, ATMs
L2; Platforms	Platform 2 Westbound	Towards ← Sikandra; Next Station: Medical College
L2; Platforms	Island platform | Doors will open on the right
L2; Platforms	Platform 1 Eastbound	Towards → Taj East Gate; Next Station: Taj Mahal
L2

== Entry/Exits ==
- Gate 1 - Bijli Ghar Chauraha
