= Yellow Line (Agra Metro) =

Mass transit system in Uttar Pradesh, India

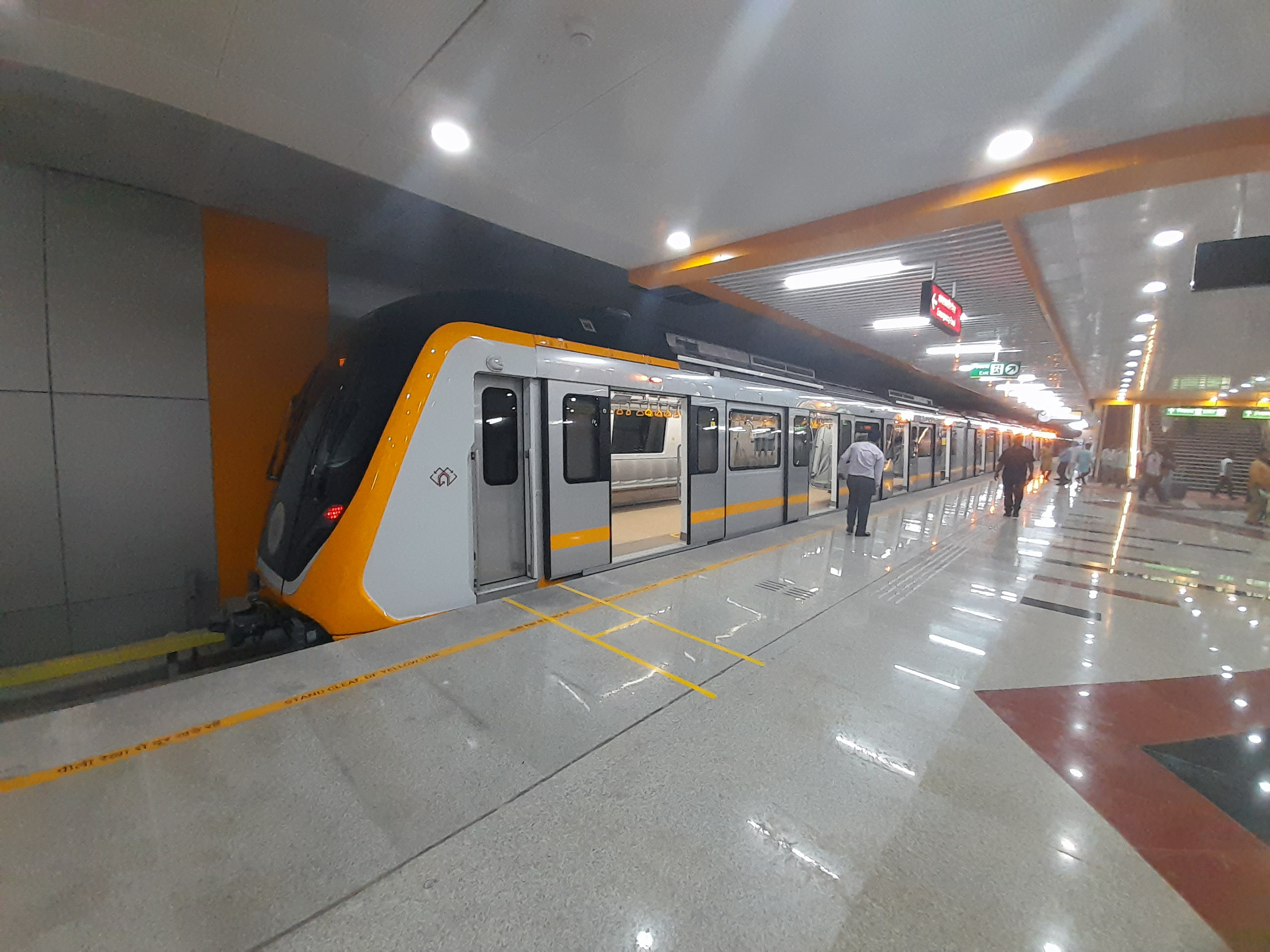
- Yellow Line train at Mankameshwar Temple station

Overview
- Status: Partially Operational
- Locale: Agra, Uttar Pradesh, India
- Termini: Mankameshwar (further extended to Sikandra); Taj East Gate
- Stations: 13; 6 (operational)

Service
- Type: Rapid Transit
- System: Agra Metro
- Operator: Uttar Pradesh Metro Rail Corporation
- Rolling stock: Alstom - Bombardier Movia

History
- Opened: 6 March 2024; 2 years ago

Technical
- Line length: 14.25 km (8.85 mi); 6.5 km (4.0 mi) (operational)
- Character: underground and elevated
- Track gauge: 1,435 mm (4 ft 8 1/2 in) standard gauge
- Electrification: 750 V DC third rail
- Operating speed: 80 km/h (50 mph) (maximum); 34 km/h (21 mph) (average)

The Yellow Line (Line 1) (Hindi: येलो लाइन) is a partly operational metro rail line of the Agra Metro, a rapid transit system in Agra, Uttar Pradesh, India. The 5.3 km section of the line was inaugurated by PM Modi on 6 March 2024. Once complete, it will connect Sikandra to Taj East Gate by the distance of 13.3 km.

== List of stations ==
Yellow Line
#	Station Name		Opening	Connections	Layout
#	English	Hindi	Opening	Connections	Layout
1	Sikandra	सिकंदरा	Under construction	None	Elevated
2	Guru Ka Taal	गुरु का ताल	Under construction	None	Elevated
3	ISBT	आईएसबीटी	Under construction	None	Elevated
4	RBS College	आरबीएस कॉलेज	Under construction	None	Underground
5	Raja Ki Mandi	राजा की मंडी	Under construction	Raja Ki Mandi	Underground
6	Agra College	आगरा कॉलेज	Under construction	Blue Line	Underground
7	Medical College	मेडिकल कॉलेज	Under construction	None	Underground
8	Mankameshwar	मनः कामेश्वर	6 March 2024	Agra Fort	Underground
9	Dr. Ambedkar Chowk	डॉ. अम्बेडकर चौक	6 March 2024	None	Underground
10	Taj Mahal	ताज महल	6 March 2024	None	Underground
11	Fatehabad Road	फतेहाबाद रोड	6 March 2024	None	Elevated
12	Shaheed Captain Shubham Gupta	शहीद कैप्टन शुभम गुप्ता	6 March 2024	None	Elevated
13	Taj East Gate	ताज ईस्ट गेट	6 March 2024	None	Elevated

== See also ==
- Agra
- Uttar Pradesh Metro Rail Corporation
- Uttar Pradesh State Road Transport Corporation
- List of rapid transit systems in India
- List of metro systems
