= Idgah Bus Stand =

Idgah Bus Station is the biggest bus station in Agra. It is located in Idgah Colony. The bus stand is very close to both the Idgah Railway Station as well as the Agra Cantt, which is the main railway station in Agra.

Uttar Pradesh State Road Transport Corporation (UPSRTC) operates hi-tech, deluxe, semi-deluxe and ordinary buses from here.

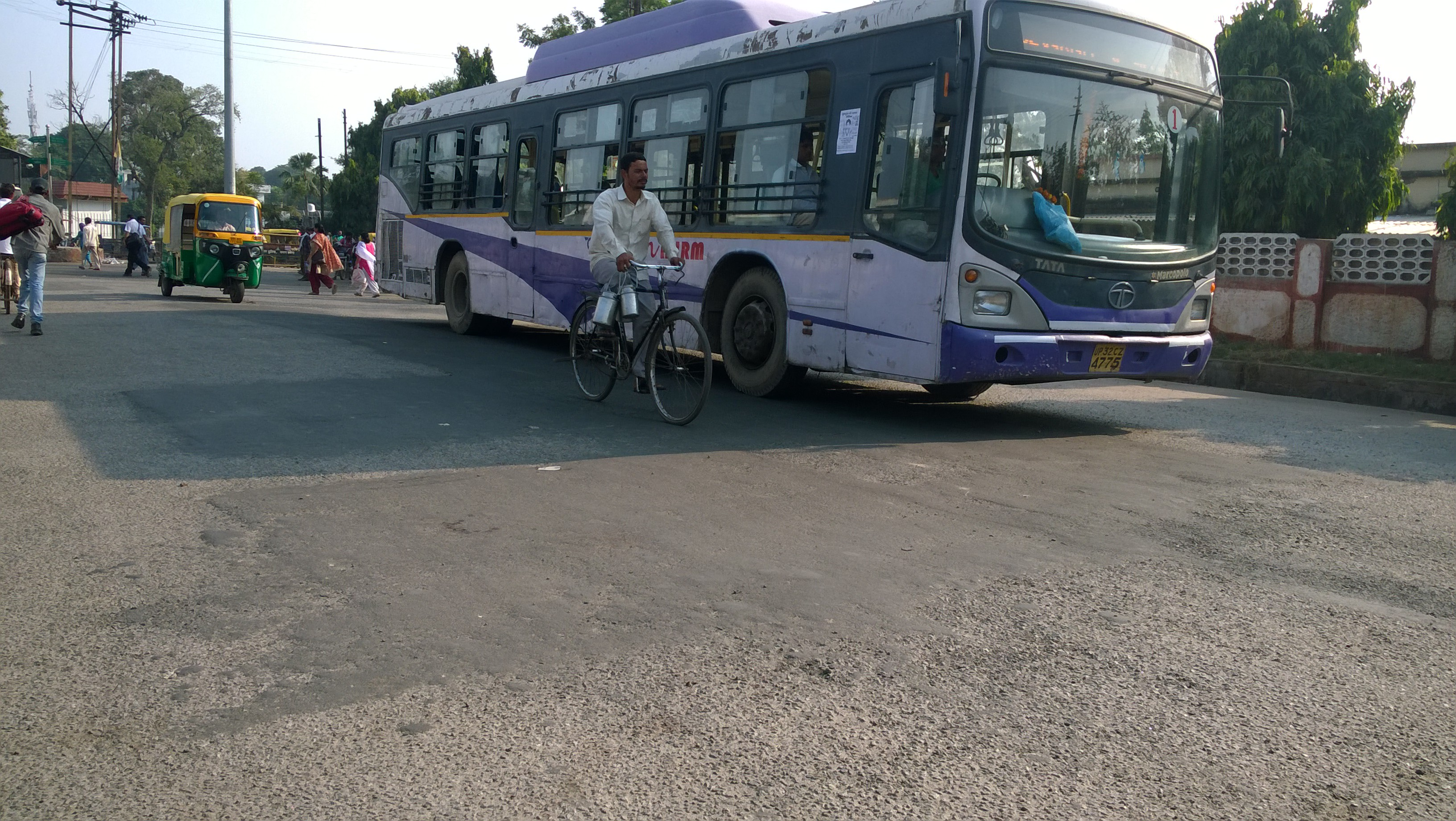
City bus near Agra Cant railway station

== Destinations ==
List of major destinations for which buses are available from Idgah Bus Stand are

- Delhi
- Jaipur
- Mathura
- Kanpur
- Lucknow
- Fatehpur Sikri
- Gwalior
- Jhansi
- Chandigarh
- Bareilly

== See also ==
- Railways in Agra
