= Intermediate public transport =

Flexible form of public transit

Intermediate public transport (IPT), also known as paratransit in some contexts, encompasses a range of hired road vehicles that offer flexible passenger transportation services. Unlike traditional public transit, IPT does not operate on a fixed schedule and may vary in its adherence to set routes.

Intermediate public transport and paratransit are distinct concepts, and merging or redirecting one to the other can misrepresents both. While both involve transport modes outside formal mass transit, their purpose, user groups, contexts, and operational models differ, intermediate public transport, especially as used in developing countries, refers to informal or semi-formal small-scale public transport modes like auto-rickshaws, tempos, and shared minibuses, designed for the general public to fill mass transit gaps affordably. In contrast, paratransit, especially as defined in North American and European contexts, refers primarily to flexible, demand-responsive services catering to specific populations (such as persons with disabilities) or low-density areas underserved by formal systems. Importantly, IPT modes are a permanent and essential part of the transport ecosystem in many cities, while paratransit often serves as an auxiliary or complementary service. Therefore, equating IPT with paratransit can introduce geographical bias and also underplay the significant and distinct role that IPT plays in the Global South.

The concept of intermediate public transport exhibits considerable variation between developed and developing nations. In developed countries, it is typically a flexible, demand-responsive form of public transportation designed to provide point-to-point service. These systems are generally well-structured and organized. In developing countries, IPT often operates as an informal, cost-effective alternative to formal transportation modes. It tends to be unorganized and subject to minimal government regulation, serving as a prevalent form of spontaneous public transport that facilitates quick and convenient travel.

The importance of IPT may extends beyond mobility, as it can also contribute to the economic well-being of those who operate these services. In some cases, drivers of vehicles such as tempos and autorickshaws can earn a substantial daily income, which supports their livelihoods.

== Defining IPT in different contexts ==
The concept of intermediate public transport exhibits considerable variation between developed and developing nations. In developed countries, it is typically a flexible, demand-responsive form of public transportation designed to provide point-to-point service. These systems are generally well-structured and organized. In developing countries, IPT often operates as an informal, cost-effective alternative to formal transportation modes. It tends to be unorganized and subject to minimal government regulation, serving as a prevalent form of spontaneous public transport that facilitates quick and convenient travel.

== Historical context ==
The concept of intermediate public transport has evolved over time, adapting to the changing needs of urban mobility in different parts of the world. In developing countries, IPT emerged organically as a response to inadequate formal public transportation systems. In India, for example, cycle rickshaws appeared in the 1940s, followed by auto-rickshaws in the 1950s. These modes filled the gap between walking and formal public transport, providing flexible and affordable mobility options for short to medium distances. In Africa and parts of Asia, informal minibus services known variously as matatus, dalla-dallas, or jeepneys have long served as a crucial form of public transport. These evolved from shared taxis and grew to become an integral part of urban mobility in many cities. The rise of digital technologies in the 21st century has led to new forms of IPT, such as app-based ride-hailing services. These platforms have blurred the lines between traditional taxis and paratransit, offering new levels of flexibility and convenience. Today, IPT continues to play a vital role in urban mobility worldwide, particularly in developing countries where it often serves as the primary mode of public transport for many residents.

== City-specific implementations and local nomenclature ==
City	Local name	Vehicle type	Primary role	Est. capacity	Regulation type	Market share
Manila	Jeepney	Stretched military jeep	Main arterial transit; often follows fixed corridors.	15–20		
Nairobi	Matatu	Minibus	Primary city-wide transit; organized via private cooperatives; highly flexible routing	14–32		
Mexico City	Pesero / microbus	Sedan or small bus	Fills gaps in the metro network; serves peripheral neighborhoods.	4–22		
Jakarta	Angkot / Bajaj	Minivan / 3-wheeler	Localized feeder services to main road networks.	3–11		
Kolkata	Auto-rickshaw / Toto	3-wheeler (electric/gas)	Last-mile connectivity; specifically helps in high-density areas.	3–6		
Lagos	Danfo / molue	Volkswagen Transporter van / yellow minibus or large bus	Vital transport backbone; often highly congested corridors; high-frequency trunk and feeder service.	12–40		
Bangkok	Tuk-tuk / songthaew	3-wheeler / pickup truck	Tourism-focused (tuk-tuk) vs. community feeder (songthaew).	3–12		
Lima	Combi	Van / minibus	Dominant informal transit; often competes directly with formal buses.	10–15		
