= Agra Metro =

Mass rapid transit system in the city of Agra, India

Coordinates: 27°11′N 78°01′E

- UPMRC logo

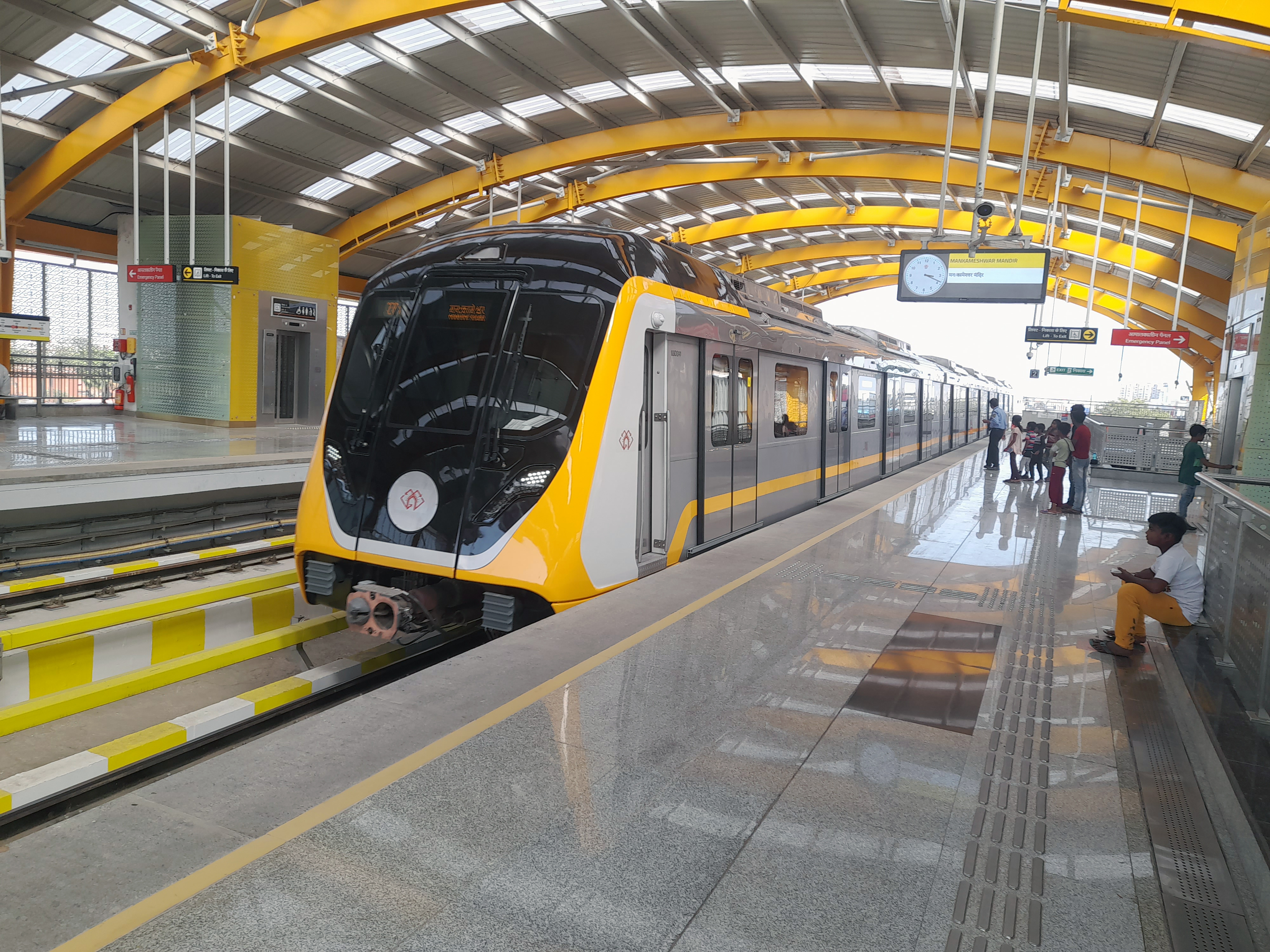
- Train at Fatehabad Road station

Overview
- Native name: आगरा मेट्रो
- Owner: Uttar Pradesh Metro Rail Corporation
- Area served: Agra
- Locale: Agra, Uttar Pradesh
- Transit type: Rapid transit
- Number of lines: 2
- Line number: Partially Operational: Yellow Line; Under Construction: Blue Line
- Number of stations: 27 (Phase 1); 6 (priority corridor)
- Website: agra.upmetrorail.com

Operation
- Began operation: 6 March 2024; 2 years ago
- Character: Elevated & Underground
- Train length: 3 Coaches

Technical
- System length: 30 km (Phase-1); 6 km (priority corridor)
- Track gauge: 1,435 mm (4 ft 8 1/2 in) standard gauge
- Electrification: 750 V DC third rail
- Average speed: 34.0 km/h (21.1 mph)
- Top speed: 90 km/h (56 mph)
System map
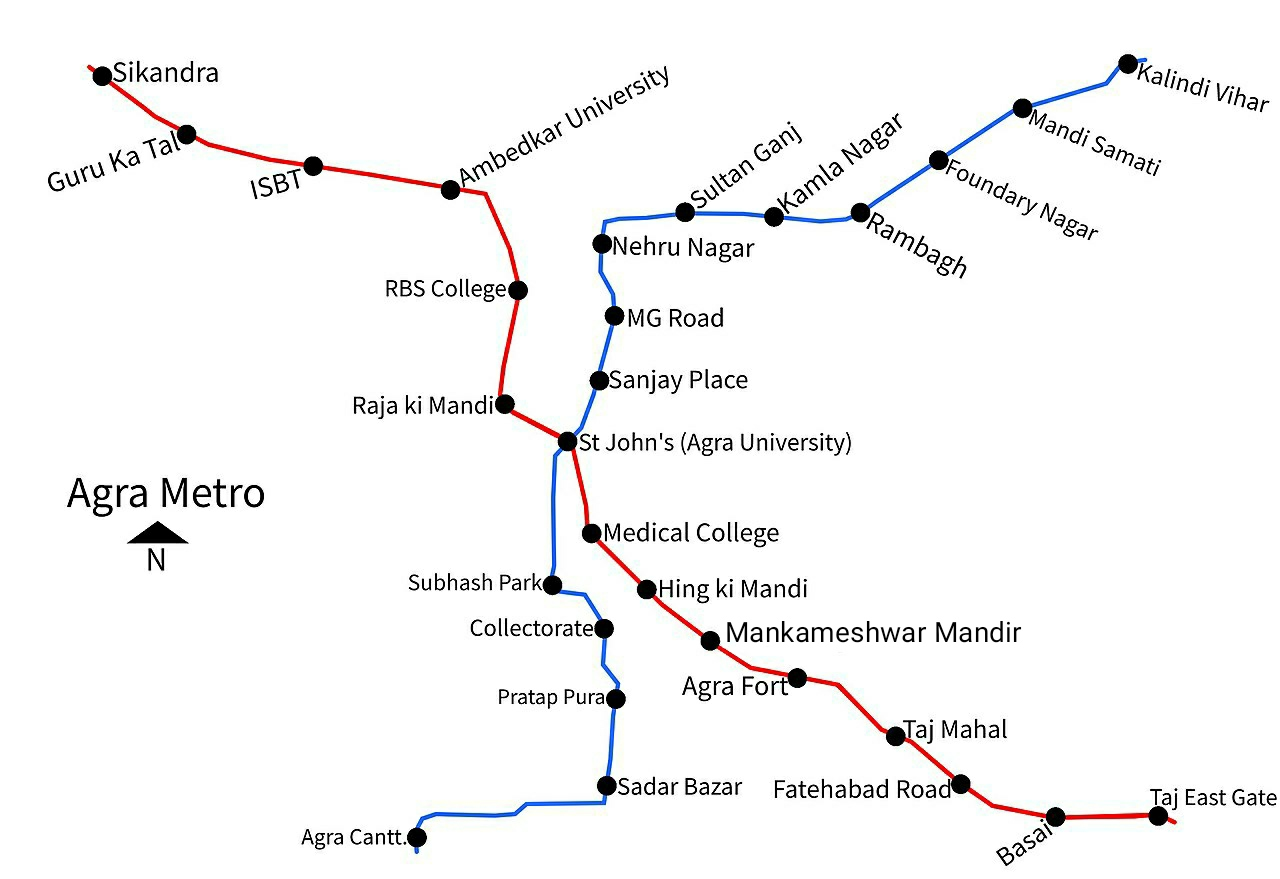

The Agra Metro is a rapid transit system in Agra, Uttar Pradesh, India. The metro is owned and operated by the Uttar Pradesh Metro Rail Corporation (UPMRC). It is set to consist of two metro lines, with a total length of 30 kilometres (19 mi) and 27 stations. The Agra Metro is one of five rapid transit system in Uttar Pradesh, the others being the Lucknow Metro, Meerut Metro, Kanpur Metro, and Noida Metro.

== History ==
The cost of construction is estimated at ₹350 crore per km. The cost will be evaluated based on the June 2015 price index.

Agra Metro Rail Project will have two corridors that will pass through the heart of the city and will connect prominent tourist places including Taj Mahal, Agra Fort, and Sikandra as well as ISBT, Raja Ki Mandi railway station, Medical College, Agra Cantonment railway station, Collectorate, Sanjay Place, and surrounding densely populated residential areas.

Highlights of these corridors include: In 2020, Bombardier Transportation won the contract to supply the rolling stock and the signalling system, and the project received conditional clearance from the Supreme Court. However the contract was cancelled and Alstom was chosen to supply the rolling stock for the Yellow line. The rolling stock belongs to the Alstom Movia family, and resembles those that run on the Kanpur Metro. On 6 March 2023, the first set of coaches arrived at the Taj Station of the Yellow line from Alstom's manufacturing facility at Savli in Gujarat.

== Construction Phases ==
=== Phase 1 ===
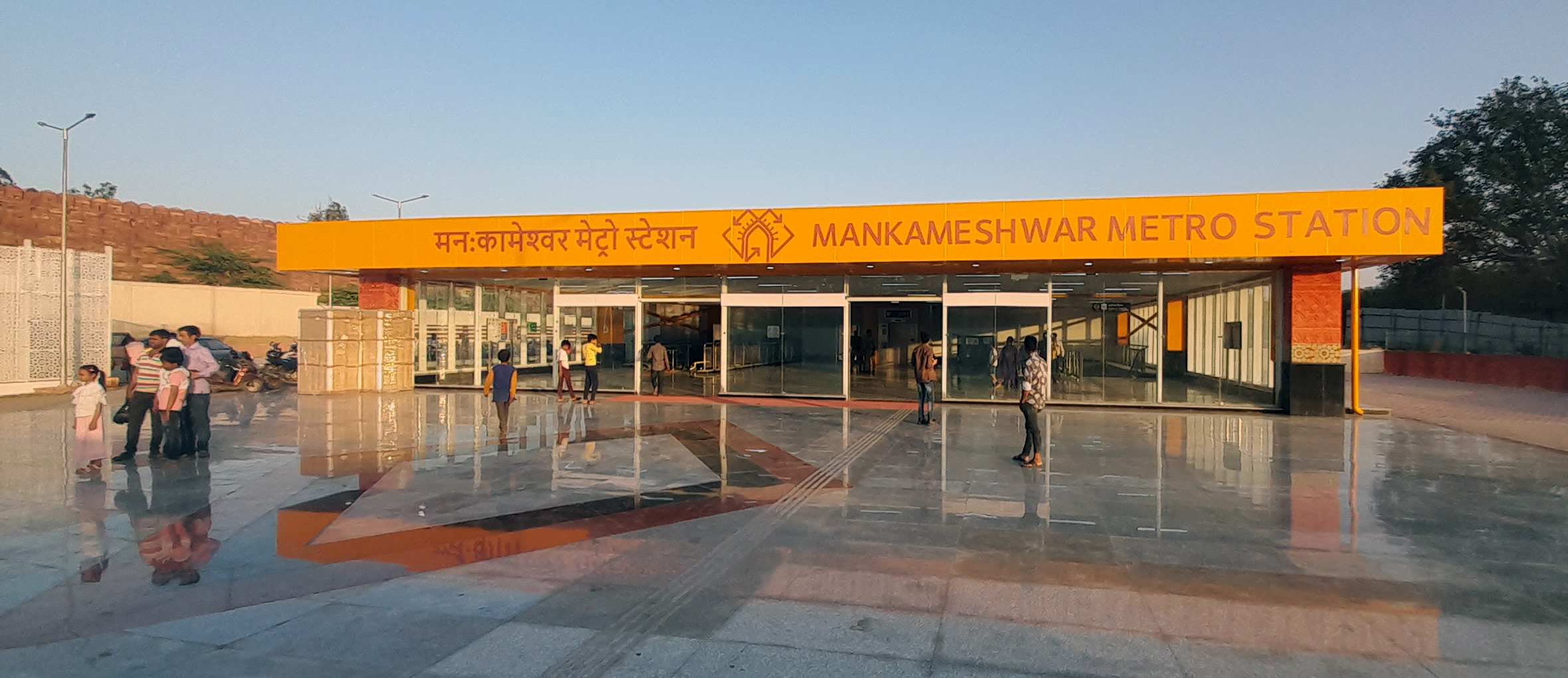
Mankameshwar Temple Metro Station

Phase 1 of the Agra Metro comprises the Yellow Line, connecting Sikandra with Taj East Gate, and the Blue Line, connecting Agra Cantonment with Kalindi Vihar.

==== Yellow Line ====
The Yellow Line connects Taj East Gate with Sikandra and includes both elevated and underground sections. Construction formally commenced on 7 December 2020, with initial work concentrated on the priority section between Taj East Gate and Mankameshwar.

Underground tunnelling began in February 2023. On 25 April 2023, the tunnel boring machine Yamuna reached Agra Fort station after excavating approximately 334 metres from the launching shaft at Ramlila Maidan. This marked the first tunnel breakthrough on the project. The machine subsequently proceeded towards Taj Mahal station.

Testing progressed during 2023. On 28 December, a trial run was completed through the entire three-kilometre underground portion, enabling train movement along the full priority section. Following safety approval in late February 2024, the Taj East Gate–Mankameshwar priority section was inaugurated on 6 March 2024.

Construction continued beyond Mankameshwar towards Sikandra. Erection of U-girders on the ISBT–Sikandra elevated section began on 30 March 2025. By the end of December 2025, a trial run had been conducted on the up line between Mankameshwar and ISBT, passing through the stations at SN Medical College, Agra College, Raja Ki Mandi and RBS College. Track laying on the down line had also been completed, while installation of the third rail, signalling and other systems continued.

In October 2026, construction remained underway at Guru Ka Tal and Sikandra stations. Five additional stations, comprising four underground stations and one elevated station, were reported to be complete and awaiting inauguration.

==== Blue Line ====
The Blue Line, also designated Corridor 2, forms part of Phase 1 and connects Agra Cantonment railway station with Kalindi Vihar through 14 elevated stations. In October 2024, Larsen & Toubro announced that it had secured the design and construction contract from the Uttar Pradesh Metro Rail Corporation. The announced scope included a 15.09-kilometre elevated mainline viaduct, 14 stations and a 2.61-kilometre connection between Sadar Bazar and the existing PAC depot. Station architectural finishes and electrical and mechanical works were also included. The contractor stated a completion period of 30 months.

Construction reached a milestone in May 2025 with the installation of the corridor's first pier cap at Agra Cantonment. The pier caps were manufactured at a casting yard in Dauki before being transported to the construction sites. Each cap weighed approximately 65 tonnes and was installed using a 400-tonne crane.

The corridor also involves the construction of a bridge across the Yamuna River. In September 2026, work resumed on three river piers after a two-month suspension caused by high water levels. Seven other piers had been completed by that time.

By mid-October 2026, trial runs had begun on an approximately three-kilometre down-line section between the depot entry line and Sadar Bazar station. During these trials, a metro train passed through Mall Road for the first time.

Phase 1
| Line Name | Terminals | | Length | Stations | Status | Opening Date |
|---|---|---|---|---|---|---|
| Yellow Line | Sikandra | Mankameshwar | 9.07 km | 7 | Under construction | |
| Yellow Line | Mankameshwar | Taj East Gate | 5.2 km | 6 | Completed | 6 March 2024 |
| Blue Line | Agra Cantt. | Kalindi Vihar | 16 km | 15 | Under construction | |
| Total | | | 30 km | 28 | | |

== Lines ==
=== Yellow Line ===
The Yellow Line is planned to run from Sikandra to Taj East Gate. The corridor is about 13.7 kilometres (8.5 mi) long, with six elevated and seven underground stations. The first section, covering 6 kilometres (3.7 mi) between Taj East Gate and Mankameshwar, was inaugurated on 6 March 2024.

=== Blue Line ===
The Blue Line is planned to connect Agra Cantonment railway station with Kalindi Vihar. The corridor will extend for 15.7 kilometres (9.8 mi) and comprise 14 elevated stations.

== Network ==
Agra Metro
| No. | Line Name | Terminal | | Station | Length | First Operational | Last Extension |
|---|---|---|---|---|---|---|---|
| 1 | Yellow Line | Mankameshwar Mandir | Taj East Gate | 6 | 6 km (3.7 mi) | 6 March 2024 | |
| Total | | | | 6 | 6 km (3.7 mi) | | |

== Project timeline ==
- July 2016: Detailed Project Report submitted to the State Government.
- September 2017: The central government rejected the DPR of Agra Metro as it didn't conform with the new Metro Rail Policy 2017 introduced that month.
- January 2018: The UP Government Cabinet decides to build metros in Meerut, Kanpur, and Agra.
- September 2018: Detailed Project Report (DPR) sent by the UP Government to the Central Government.
- 7 February 2019: The UP Government has allocated ₹ 175 crore to start preliminary work in budget.
- 28 February 2019: Central Government approved the metro project in Agra.
- 8 March 2019: Foundation stone laid down by Prime Minister Narendra Modi.
- August 2019: LMRC has requested relevant authorities to transfer land for Metro construction.
- January 2020: Construction work yet to start as few permissions from the Supreme Court of India, Taj Trapezium Zone Authority (TTZ), Forest department, Archaeological Survey of India and other departments are pending. Once permissions are in place, land acquisition will take another 3 months.
- 15 June 2020: TYPSA - Italferr JV wins General Consultant contract
- July 2020: Bombardier Transportation won the Agra Metro and Kanpur Metro rolling stock and signalling contract. Agra Metro project gets conditional clearance from the Supreme Court. The project which was stuck due to the court stay will now progress fast.
- October 2020: Contract awarded for construction for three metro stations. Civil engineering work to start in December 2020.
- December 2020: Prime Minister Narendra Modi inaugurated the construction work at the Agra Metro Project Site on 7 December 2020.
- April 2021: In Agra metro priority section, a total of 688 piles are to be constructed in the 3 km long portion on Fatehabad Road, in which 344 piles are ready, 10 pillars are built, and digging is continued for 3 metro stations.
- May 2021: UP Metro has built 400 piles out of a total of 686 in the priority section of the Agra Metro project. With this, 45 pile-caps and 16 pillars are also ready. The work of a zero discharge facility at Agra Metro depot is also at a rapid pace. For the zero discharge facility, several underground tanks of different capacities will be built in the Agra Metro Depot complex. For zero discharge facility, a joint water treatment plant of 1 lakh litre capacity will be set up at Agra Metro Depot. In this water treatment plant, the grey water coming out from the kitchen, washroom, floor cleaning, will be recycled. For this, a plant with a capacity of 70,000 litres will be installed. Similarly, a 30,000 litres capacity plant will be set up to treat such black water by washing the coach and whatever other chemical-rich water will come out. Both the plants will be built in the same building so that they can be used in a better way.
- June 2021: Construction of depot line for Agra Metro has begun with the commencement of piling work on the depot line with 13 piles already constructed so far.} The depot line will connect the mainline with the Metro Depot which is under construction at PAC Ground where metro trains will be stabled and maintained. For the depot line, a total of 500 piles, 39 pile capes, and 34 piers will be constructed.
- June 2021: The casting of the concourse beam of Taj East Gate, the first metro station of Agra Metro, has also started. The piling work has already been completed with the construction of 69 piles of Taj East Gate Metro Station. Currently, the pillars are being constructed in the side grid of Taj East Gate Metro Station. Soon the construction of the concourse level will also start.
- June 2021: Along with the construction of the Agra Metro Project Priority Section (Taj East Gate to Jama Masjid), UP Metro has also started the construction of the Depot Line. For this, along with starting the piling, the construction of 13 piles has also been completed. The covered train stabling yard, integrated workshop, and pit wheel length are being constructed in Agra Metro Depot with the new PEB (Pre Engineering Building) technique.
- July 2021: European Investment Bank (EIB) to fund €480 million for Agra Metro Rail Project.
- August 2021: Unique codes of all metro stations in Agra Metro Rail Project get approved by Indian Railways, as of 7 August.
- August 2021: European Investment Bank (EIB) approves and is ready to fund 480 mn euros for Agra Metro Rail Project, as of 10 August.
- Aug 2021: Taj East Gate Metro Station takes shape, and it will be the first metro station of Agra Metro to be completed, as of 24 August.
- September 2021: Construction begins of Agra Metro's second metro station, Basai Metro Station.
- October 2021: Tenders invited for electrification contract for Agra Metro.
- December 2021: Work on Agra Metro's third metro station, Fatehabad Metro Station, is expected to be completed by December-end.
- July 2023 : Trial run begins.
- March 2024: Prime Minister Narendra Modi inaugurated the priority corridor section of Agra Metro on 6 March 2024.

== Project highlights ==
The cost of construction is estimated at ₹350 crore per km. The cost will be evaluated based on the June 2015 price index.

Agra Metro Rail Project will have two corridors that will pass through the heart of the city and will connect prominent tourist places including Taj Mahal, Agra Fort, and Sikandra as well as ISBT, Raja Ki Mandi railway station, Medical College, Agra Cantonment railway station, Collectorate, Sanjay Place, and surrounding densely populated residential areas.

Highlights of these corridors include:

1. The length of Sikandra to Taj East Gate corridor 14.00 km, which is partly elevated and partly underground and comprises 13 stations (6-Elevated and 7-Underground).
2. The length of Agra Cantt to Kalindi Vihar corridor is 15.40 km comprising 14 stations all elevated.
3. The estimated cost of the project is ₹8,379.62 crore and the project will be completed in five years.

About 20 lakh population of the city is expected to be benefited by Agra Metro Rail Project directly and indirectly at the time of commencement of commercial operations.

The proposed corridors will be having multimodal integration with railway stations and BRT stations and will have a feeder network of bus, intermediate public transport (IPT), and non-motorized transport (NMT). The project will have non-fare box revenue from rental and advertisement as well as value capture financing (VCF) through the mechanism of transit-oriented development (TOD) and transfer of development rights (TDR).

The Agra Metro became operational on 6 March 2024.

== Important places nearby Metro stations ==
- Taj Mahal
- Agra Fort
- Bijli Ghar
- Anjana Central Mall
- Agra District Court
- Sanjay Place
- Agra Cantt
- ISBT
- Ram Bagh
- Langde ki chowki
- RBS College
- Agra College
- Delhi Gate
- WaterWorks Chauraha
- Bhagwan Talkies Chauraha
- Buddha Park

== Rolling stock ==
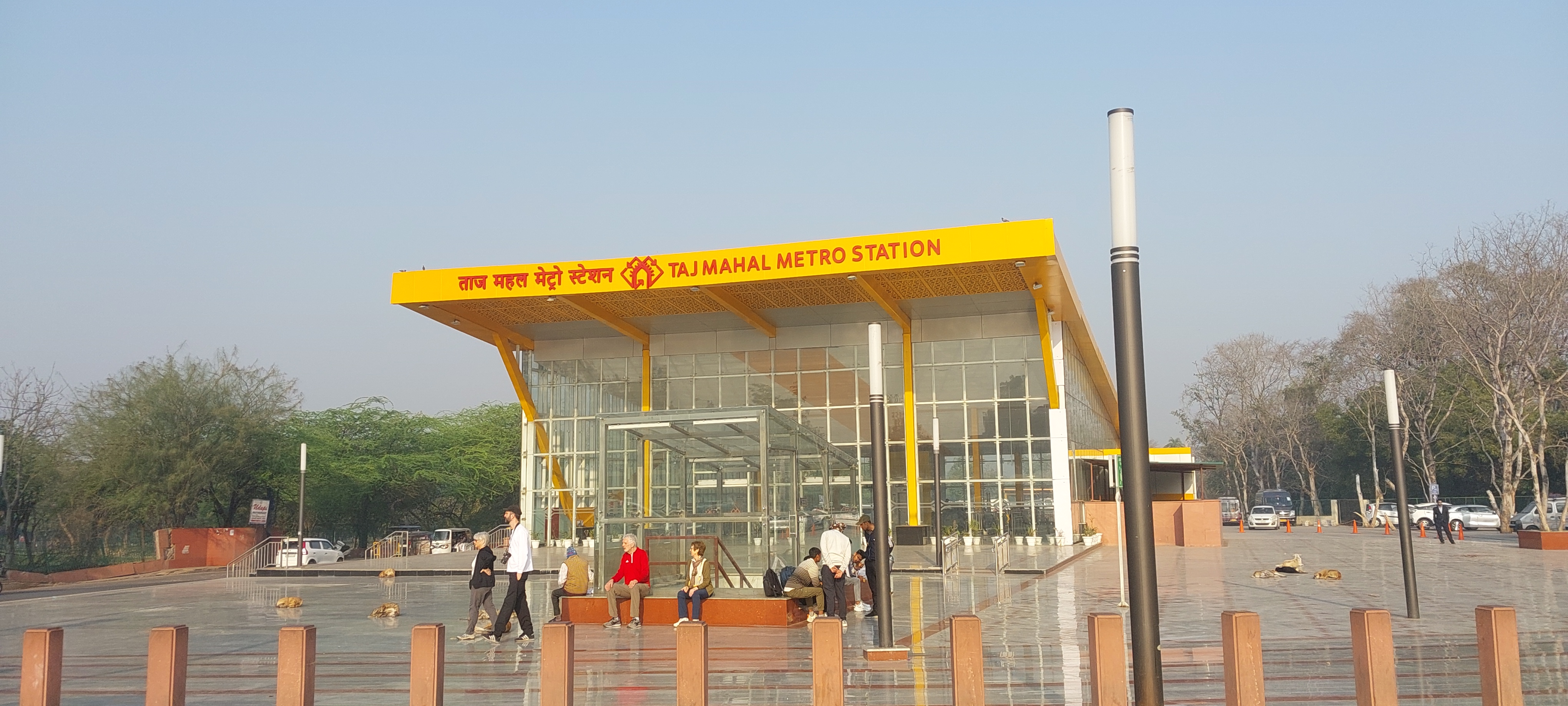
Taj Mahal metro station

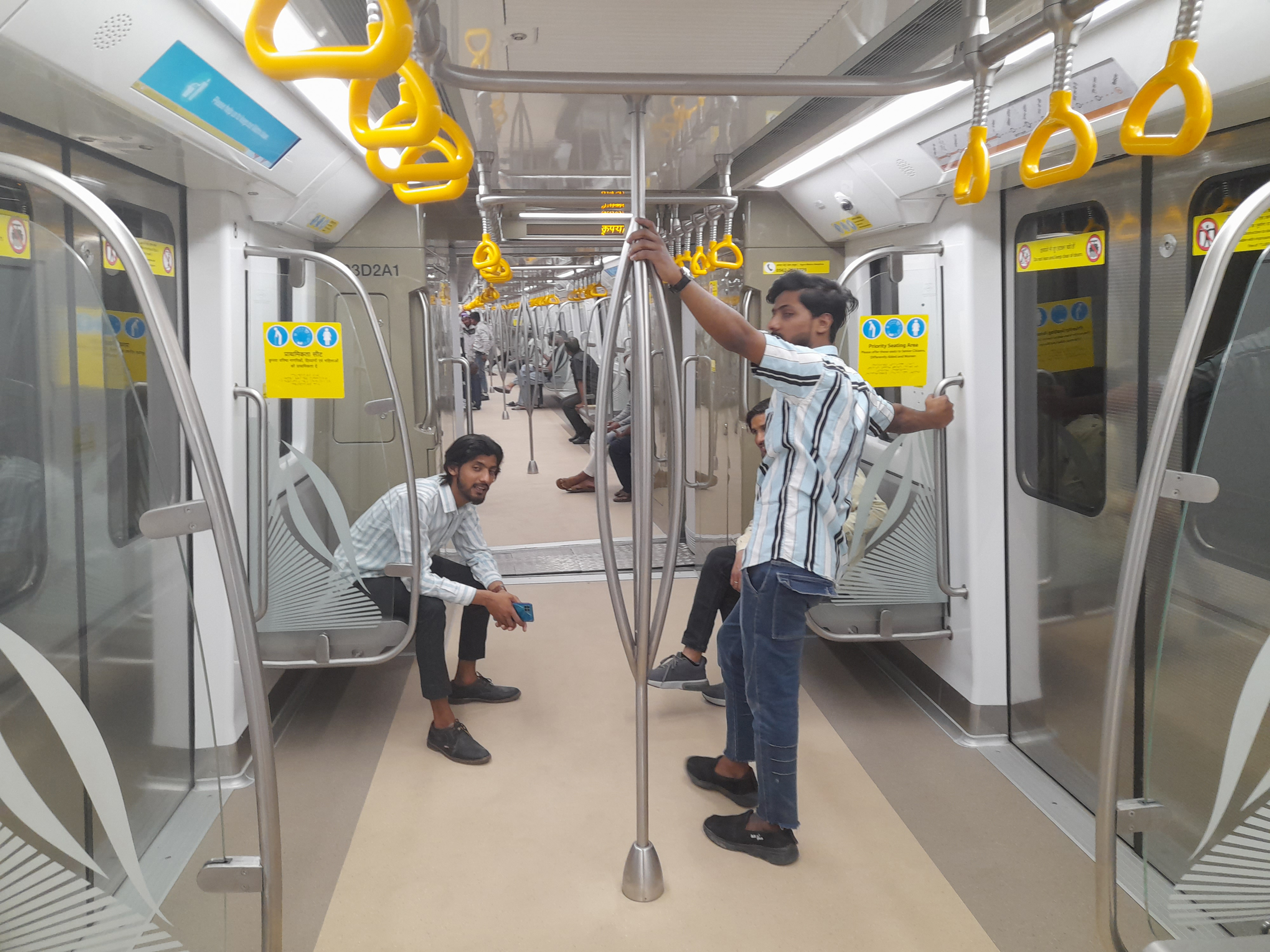
Interior view of Agra Metro

In 2020, Bombardier Transportation won the contract to supply the rolling stock and the signalling system, and the project received conditional clearance from the Supreme Court. However the contract was cancelled and Alstom was chosen to supply the rolling stock for the Yellow line. The rolling stock belongs to the Alstom Movia family, and resembles those that run on the Kanpur Metro. On 6 March 2023, the first set of coaches arrived at the Taj Station of the Yellow line from Alstom's manufacturing facility at Savli in Gujarat.

== Construction progress ==
The Agra Metro project faced initial setbacks, with its Detailed Project Report (DPR) rejected in 2017 but later approved in 2019, leading to the foundation stone being laid in March 2019. Construction progressed through multiple phases, culminating in a trial run in July 2023 and the inauguration of the priority corridor by Prime Minister Narendra Modi on 6 March 2024.

== See also ==
- Urban rail transit in India
  - Uttar Pradesh Metro Rail Corporation
    - Lucknow Metro
    - Kanpur Metro
  - Meerut Metro
  - Delhi Meerut RRTS
