= Idgah railway station =

Railway Station in Uttar Pradesh, India

General information
- Location: North Idgah Colony, Shahganj, Agra, Uttar Pradesh; India
- Coordinates: 27°10′24″N 77°59′56″E
- Elevation: 168 metres (551 ft)
- System: Indian Railways station
- Owner: Indian Railways
- Operator: North Central Railways
- Line: Tundla–Agra branch line
- Platforms: 4
- Tracks: 6

Construction
- Structure type: Standard on ground
- Parking: Yes
- Cycle facilities: No

Other information
- Status: Functioning
- Station code: IDH
- Zone(s): North Central Railway zone
- Division(s): Agra

History
- Electrified: 1982–85
Location
- Location within Uttar Pradesh Location within India

Idgah railway station is in Idgah colony in the southwest of the city of Agra, Uttar Pradesh, India. Idgah railway station serves around 75,000 passengers every day.

== History ==
The 1,000 mm (3 ft 3 3/8 in)-wide metre-gauge Delhi–Bandikui and Bandikui–Agra lines of Rajputana State Railway were opened in 1874. The Agra–Jaipur line was converted to 5 ft 6 in (1,676 mm) broad gauge in 2005.

The broad-gauge Agra–Delhi chord was opened in 1904.

== Electrification ==
The Faridabad–Mathura–Agra section was electrified in 1982–85, Tundla–Yamuna Bridge in 1998–99 and Yamuna Bridge-Agra in 1990–91.

Preceding station	Indian Railways	Following station
Agra Fort towards ?	North Central Railway zone Tundla–Agra branch line	Agra Cantonment towards ?
Agra Fort towards ?	North Central Railway zone Agra–Bharatpur branch line	Bichpuri towards ?
Agra Fort towards ?	North Central Railway zone Agra–Bayana branch line	Pathauli towards ?
