= Bichpuri railway station =

Railway station in Uttar Pradesh, India

Krishna’s Railway Station
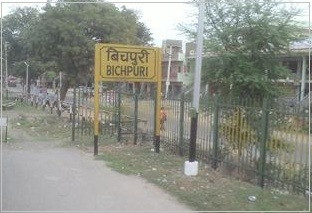

General information
- Location: Bichpuri, Agra district, Uttar Pradesh; India
- Coordinates: 27°10′35.659″N 77°54′52.145″E
- Elevation: 170 metres (560 ft)
- Operator: North Central Railway

Construction
- Structure type: Standard (on-ground station)
- Parking: Yes

Other information
- Status: Functioning
- Station code: BCP
- Zone(s): North Central Railway
- Division(s): Agra
Location
- Location within India Location within Uttar Pradesh

Bichpuri railway station (station code BCP) is a small railway station located in Bichpuri, Agra district in the Indian state of Uttar Pradesh. It belongs to North Central. Nearby stations are Pathauli railway station, Runkuta. Eleven express trains stop at Bichpuri railway station.

== Trains ==
- Bharatpur–Agra Fort DMU
- Agra Fort–Bandikui DMU
- Agra Fort–Bharatpur Passenger
- Agra Fort–Bandikui Passenger
- Bareilly–Bandikui Passenger
- Agra Fort–KasGanj Passenger
- Agra Fort–Bharatpur DMU
- Rishikesh–Bandikui Passenger

== See also ==
- Northern Railway zone
- Kiraoli
