= Interstitial granulomatous dermatitis with arthritis =

- Other names: Ackerman dermatitis syndrome, IGDA
- Specialty: Dermatology

Interstitial granulomatous dermatitis with arthritis (IGDA) or Ackerman dermatitis syndrome is a skin condition that most commonly presents with symmetrical round-to-oval red or violet plaques on the flanks, armpits, inner thighs, and lower abdomen.

== Signs and symptoms ==
Interstitial granulomatous dermatitis with arthritis commonly presents with symmetrical round-to-oval red or violet plaques on the flanks, armpits, inner thighs, and lower abdomen. The arthritis that coexists with these skin lesions may develop years, months, or even years before the cutaneous lesions first manifest. The symmetrical nature of the joint involvement is evident, frequently affecting the fingers, elbows, wrists, and shoulders.

== Causes ==
Certain medications, including beta-blockers, alpha-blockers, calcium channel blockers, hypolipidemic medications, and angiotensin-converting enzyme inhibitors, have been linked to IGDA, according to reports.

== Diagnosis ==
Autoantibodies, elevated erythrocyte sedimentation rate (ESR), and rheumatoid factor positivity are among the abnormal serologic findings reported in the majority of IGDA patients.

This entity has a unique histopathology that is characterized by a diffuse, dense inflammatory infiltrate that is primarily made up of histiocytes within the reticular dermis. Palisades are formed by small foci of histiocytes and degenerated collagen. Neutrophils and eosinophils may be found in the infiltrate in addition to other things. Vasculitis and mucin deposition are not anticipated.

== Treatment ==
There is still uncertainty surrounding the suggested therapies for IGDA. Corticosteroids, non-steroid anti-inflammatory medications, antimalarial medications, cyclosporine, dapsone, methotrexate, cyclophosphamide, and anti-TNK alpha are some examples of treatment options that can be applied topically or systemically.

== See also ==
- Skin lesion
