= Bichpuri =

- village
- Location in Uttar Pradesh, India
- Coordinates: 27°11′N 77°53′E
- Country: India
- State: Uttar Pradesh
- District: Agra

Population (2011)
  - Total: 4,260

Languages
  - Official: Hindi
- Time zone: UTC+5:30 (IST)
- Postal code: 283105

Bichpuri is a village in Agra district of Uttar Pradesh in India. Bichpuri is a big village and there are many colleges here known for peaceful peoples.

== See also ==
- Bichpuri railway station
