= Idgah, Uttar Pradesh =

Idgah may also refer to a place for public prayers during the Islamic festivals of Eid.

Idgah is towards the south-west of Agra City. Idgah has evolved into a township where many offices are located in the precincts of Idgah Colony. The place is a commercial area in Agra. Idgah has a bus stand and a railway station. Agra Airport in Kheria is also near Idgah.

== Offices ==
Offices in Idgah include:

- Foreigner's Registration Office
- Director of Telegraphs
- PWD Inspection House
- Food Corporation of India
- Tourist Information Centre
