= Agra Fort railway station =

Railway station in Uttar Pradesh, India

Agra Fort
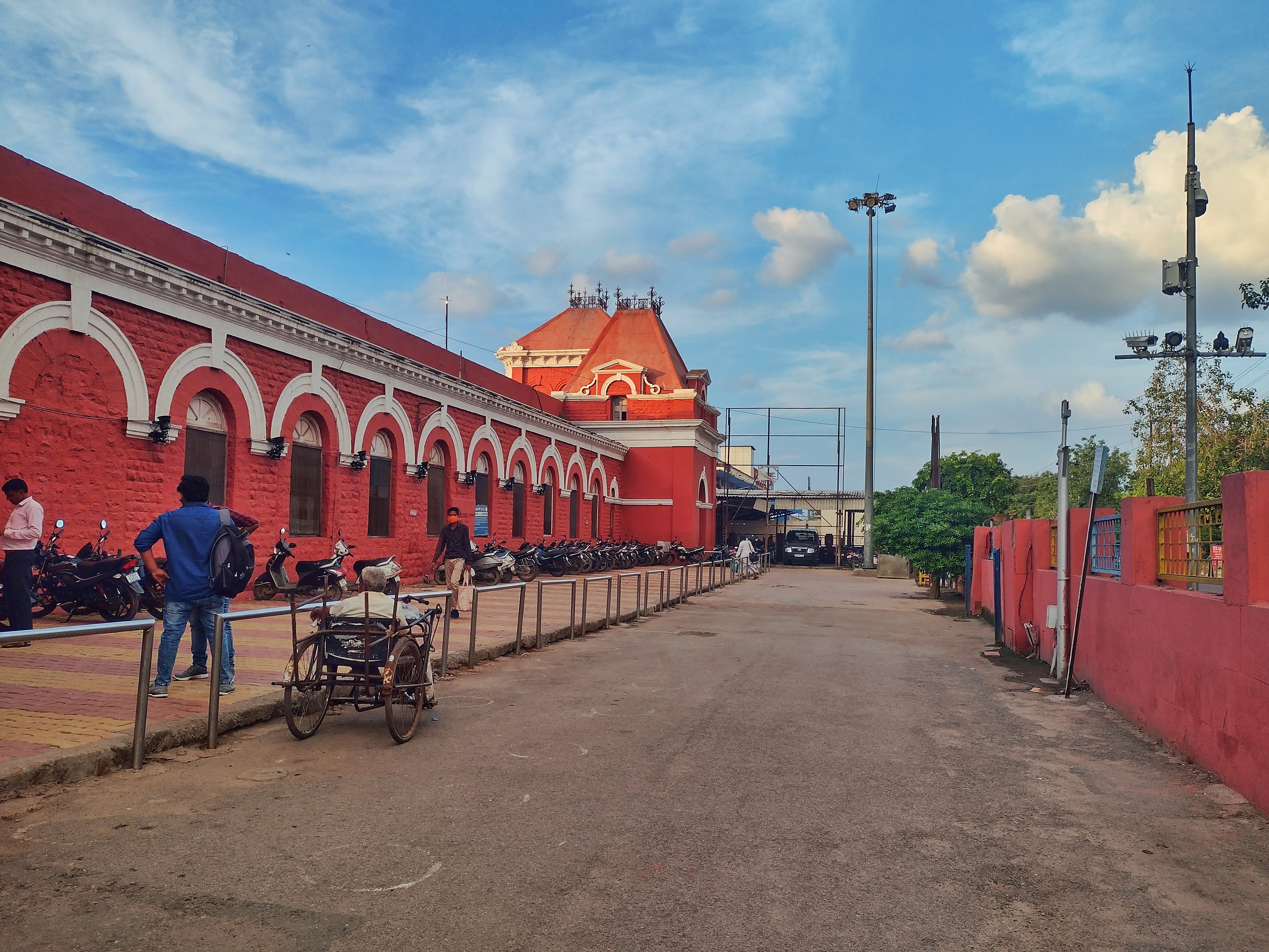
- Agra Fort railway station

General information
- Location: Rakabganj, Agra, Uttar Pradesh; India
- Coordinates: 27°11′00″N 78°01′07″E
- Elevation: 170 metres (560 ft)
- System: Indian Railways station
- Owner: Indian Railways
- Operator: North Central Railway
- Lines: Tundla–Agra railway line, Agra–Bayana railway line
- Platforms: 4
- Connections: Yellow Line Mankameshwar

Construction
- Structure type: At grade
- Parking: No
- Cycle facilities: No

Other information
- Status: Functioning
- Station code: AF
- Division(s): Agra

History
- Opened: 1874?
- Electrified: 1982–85
Location
- Location within Uttar Pradesh

Agra Fort railway station, is located near Agra Fort, in Rawatpara, Agra. It used to be one of the stations in India that had both broad gauge and metre gauge, until the line to Jaipur was converted to broad gauge. Agra Fort railway station comes under the North Central Railways. As of 2013, the station serves around 87,000 passengers every day.

== History ==
The 1,000 mm (3 ft 3 3/8 in)-wide metre-gauge Delhi–Bandikui and Bandikui–Agra lines of Rajputana State Railway were opened in 1874. The Agra–Jaipur line was converted to 5 ft 6 in (1,676 mm) broad gauge in 2005.

There was a spacious, octagonal Tripolia Chowk which existed between the Jama Masjid and the Delhi gate of the Agra Fort. This Tripolia was destroyed in order to create the Agra Fort railway station, which was also the first railway station of Agra and one of the oldest in the country.

== Electrification ==
The Faridabad–Mathura–Agra section was electrified in 1982–85, Tundla–Yamuna Bridge in 1988–89 and Yamuna Bridge–Agra in 1990–91.

== Gallery ==
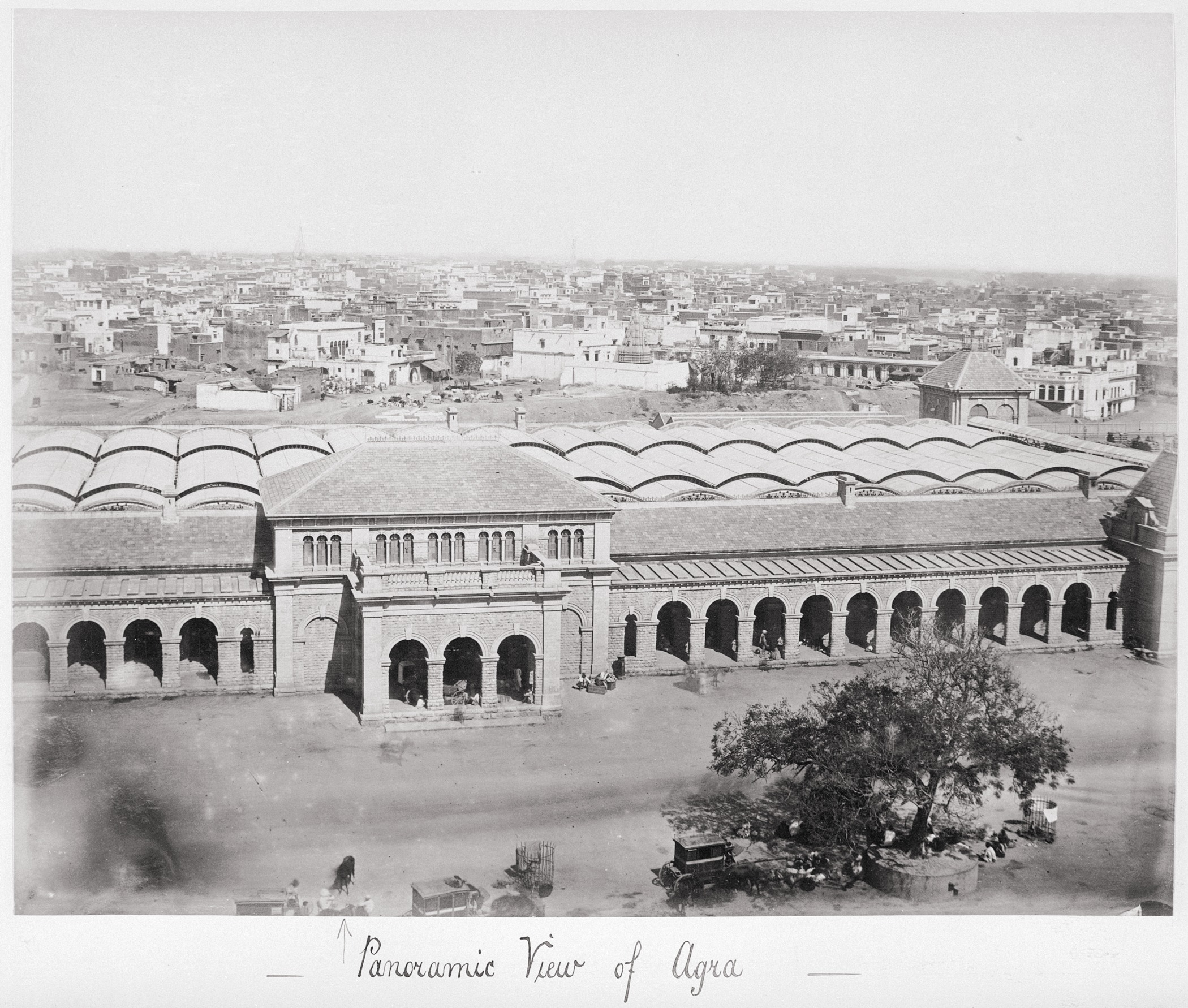
A Samuel Bourne photograph from the 1860s

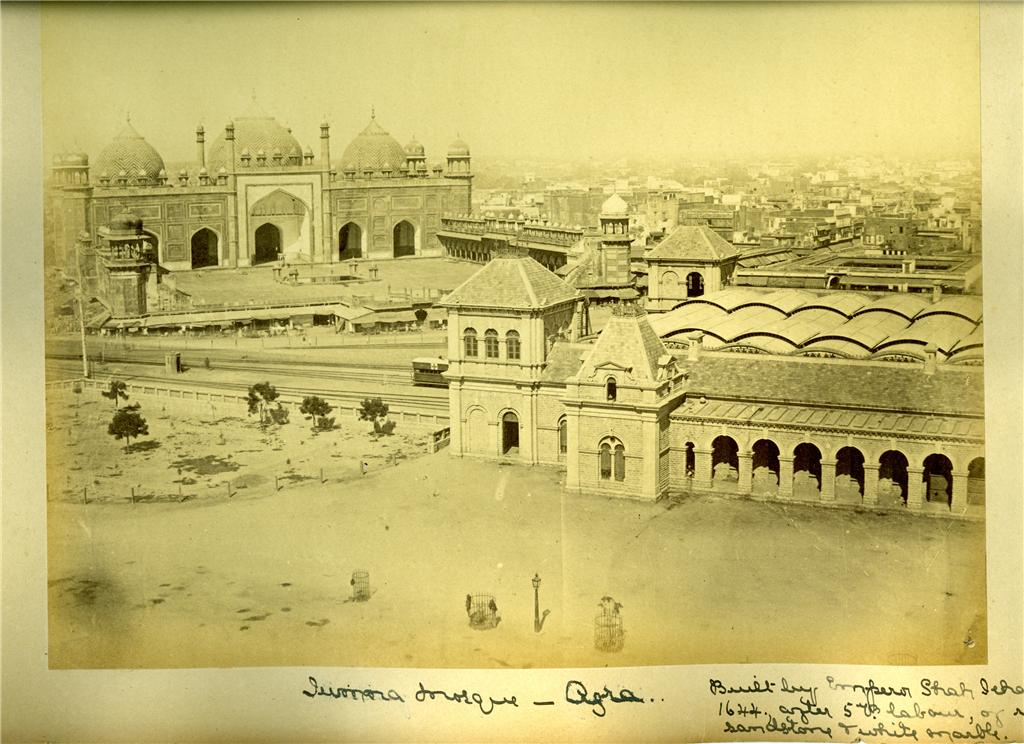
Again by Bourne, the Jama Mosque in the background, 1860s

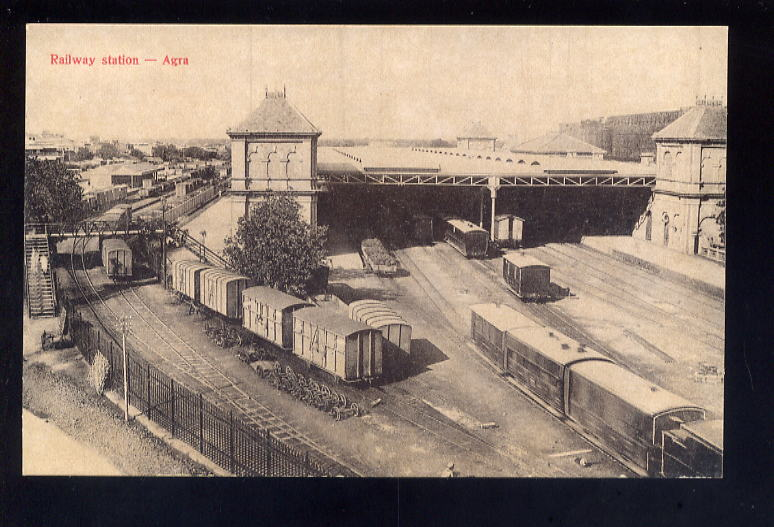
Vintage postcard of Agra railway station, taken from the Jama Mosque

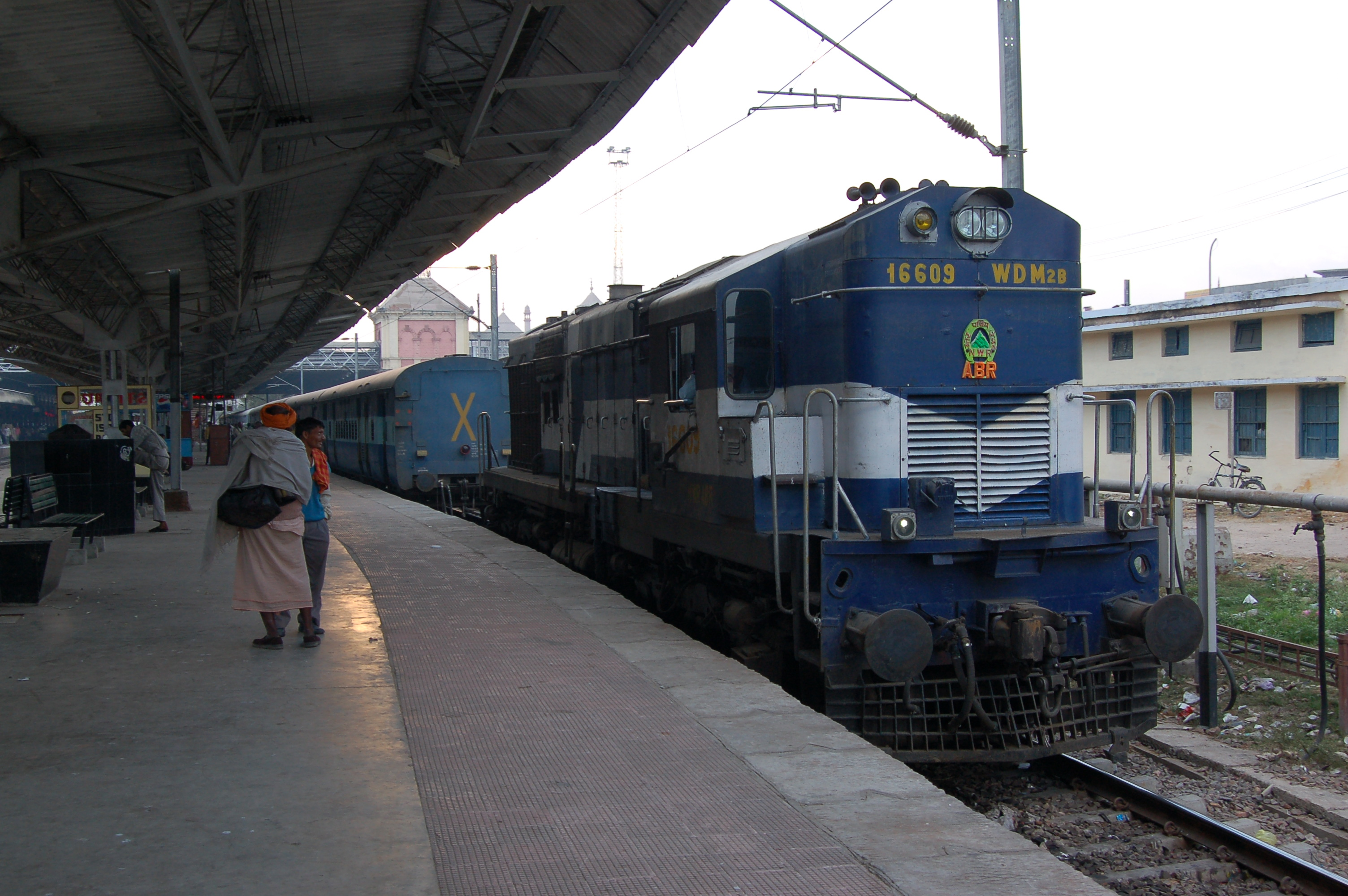
Agra Fort railway platform

== See also ==
- Railways in Agra

Preceding station	Indian Railways	Following station
Yamuna Bridge towards ?	North Central Railway zone Tundla–Agra branch line	Idgah towards ?
