= Agra City railway station =

Railway Station in Uttar Pradesh, India

Agra City
- Indian Railways logo

General information
- Location: Ghatia Road, near Belaganj, Agra, Uttar Pradesh; India
- Coordinates: 27°11′39″N 78°00′56″E
- Elevation: 165 metres (541 ft)
- System: Indian Railways station
- Owner: Indian Railways
- Operator: North Central Railway
- Line: Agra–Delhi chord
- Platforms: 2

Construction
- Structure type: Standard on ground
- Parking: No
- Cycle facilities: No

Other information
- Status: Functioning
- Station code: AGA
- Division(s): Agra

History
- Opened: 1903
- Electrified: 1982–85
Location
- Location within India Location within Uttar Pradesh

Agra City is a railway and bus station in the heart of the old city in Agra, India. It is near Belangunj, which is the trading hub of Agra. The station is a relic of the past and at present very few trains stop here.

== Overview ==
Agra, the 16–17th century capital of the Mughals, is home to monuments such as the Taj Mahal and Agra Fort. The Taj Mahal attracts 7-8 million tourists annually. About 0.8 million foreign tourists visit it.

== History ==
The station belonged to Great Indian Peninsula Railway in British era and was built in 1903 by Mistris of Kutch.

== See also ==
- Agra Cantonment railway station
- Agra Fort railway station
- Railways in Agra
