= Pathauli railway station =

Railway station in Uttar Pradesh, India

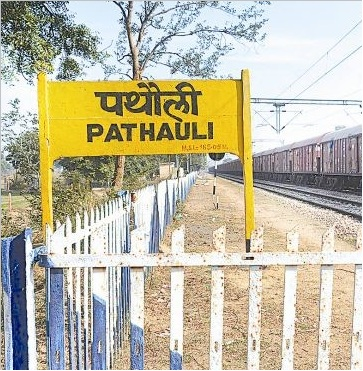

General information
- Location: Agra district, Uttar Pradesh; India
- Coordinates: 27.1567°N 77.9250°E
- Elevation: 173 metres (568 ft)
- Operator: North Central Railway

Construction
- Structure type: Standard (on ground station)
- Parking: Yes

Other information
- Status: Functioning
- Station code: PTLI
- Zone(s): North Central Railway
- Division(s): Agra
Location
- Location within India Location within Uttar Pradesh

Pathauli railway station (station code PTLI) is a railway station located in Agra district, the Indian state of Uttar Pradesh. It belongs to North Central Railway zone and has an average elevation of 173. There are some tourist places near by Pathauli like Agra, Fatehpur Sikri, Bharatpur, Mathura and Vrindavan.

== Trains ==
- Haldighati Passenger
- Agra Fort–Kota Passenger
- Agra Cantt–Bayana MEMU
- Bayana–Yamuna Bdg-Agra Passenger
- Yamuna Bdg–Agra–Bayana Passenger
- Bayana–Agra Cantt MEMU
- Kota–Yamuna Bdg–Agra Passenger

== See also ==
- Northern Railway zone
- Railways in Agra
