= Raja ki Mandi railway station =

Railway Station in Uttar Pradesh, India

Raja Ki Mandi
- Indian Railways logo

General information
- Location: Dr. H.S.sharma Road, Lohamandi, Agra, Uttar Pradesh; India
- Coordinates: 27°11′39″N 77°59′49″E
- Elevation: 170 metres (560 ft)
- System: Indian Railways station
- Owner: Indian Railways
- Operator: North Central Railway
- Lines: Agra–Delhi chord Delhi–Chennai line
- Platforms: 4
- Connections: Yellow Line Raja Ki Mandi

Construction
- Structure type: At grade
- Parking: No
- Cycle facilities: No

Other information
- Status: Functioning
- Station code: RKM
- Division(s): Agra

History
- Opened: 1904
- Electrified: 1982–85
- Former names: East Indian Railway Company
Location
- Location within Uttar Pradesh Location within India

Raja ki Mandi railway station is on the Agra–Delhi chord. It is located in Agra district in the Indian state of Uttar Pradesh. It serves Raja ki Mandi and surrounding neighbourhoods in Agra.

== Overview ==
Agra, the 16-17th century capital of the Mughals, is home to monuments such as the Taj Mahal and the Agra Fort. The Taj Mahal attracts 7-8 million tourists annually. About 0.8 million foreign tourists visit it. There is a very old temple of Goddess Chamunda, one of the forms of Maa Durga or Goddess Kali, on platform No. 1 and thousands of followers and passengers visit this temple every day, but on Saturday this number goes from thousand to lakhs.

== History ==
The broad-gauge Agra–Delhi chord was opened in 1904. The construction of this station begin in 1904. Earlier the station was located in the Raja ki Mandi main Bazar. In 1910 the station was relocated outside the main market of Raja ki mandi area

== Electrification ==
The Faridabad–Mathura–Agra section was electrified in 1982–85, Tundla–Yamuna Bridge in 1998–99 and Yamuna Bridge–Agra in 1990–91.

== Passengers ==
Raja ki Mandi railway station serves around 114,000 passengers every day.

== Amenities ==
Raja ki Mandi railway station has retiring room and a book stall.

== Gallery ==
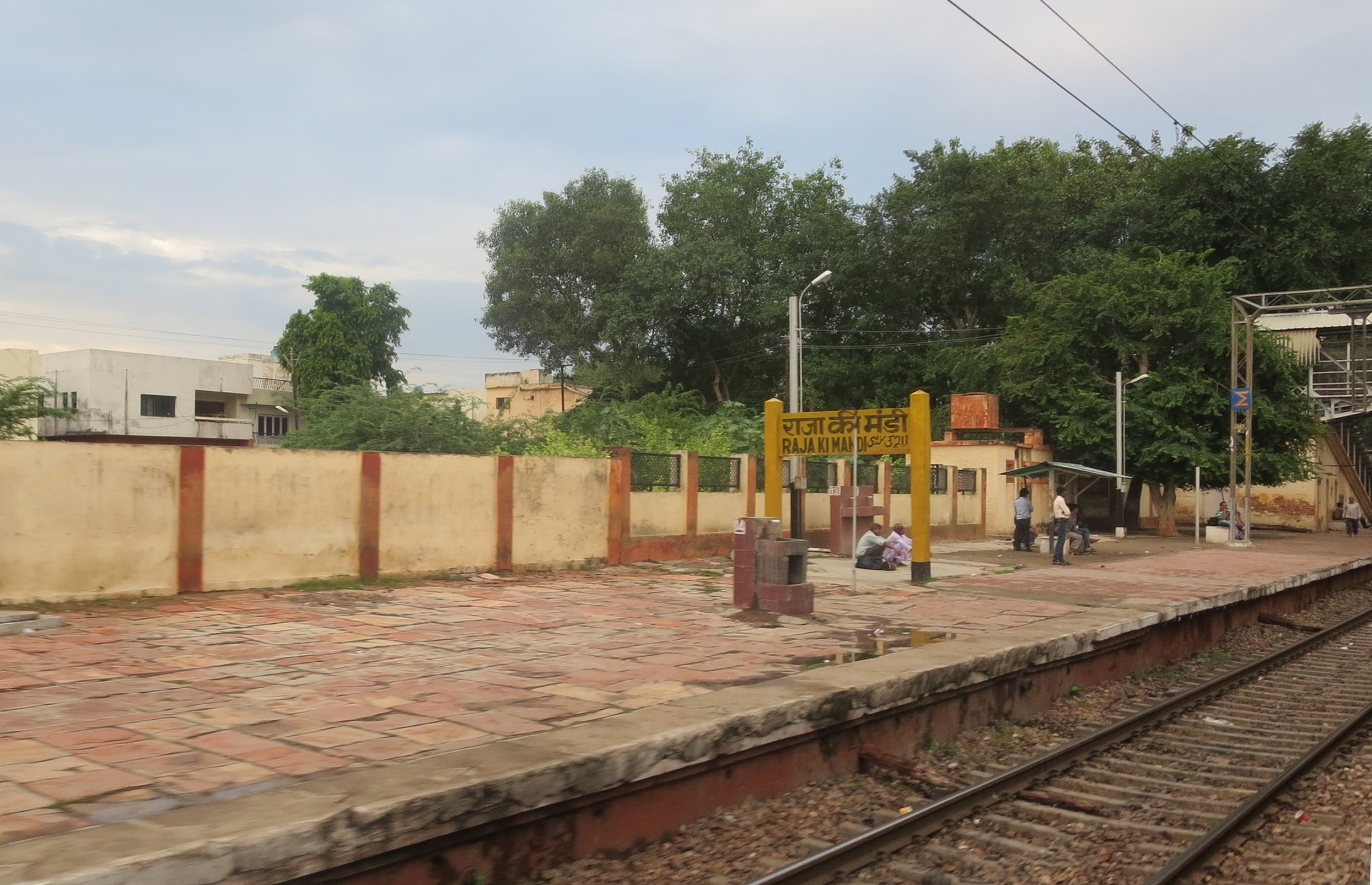
Raja ki Mandi railway station name plate on Platform No.1

Preceding station	Indian Railways	Following station
Agra Cantonment towards ?	North Central Railway zone Agra–Delhi chord	Bilochpura towards ?
