= Lokmanya Tilak Terminus–Sitapur Junction Superfast Express =

Train in India

Lokmanya Tilak Terminus - Sitapur Junction Superfast Express
Overview
- Service type: Superfast
- Current operator: Central Railway zone

Route
- Termini: Lokmanya Tilak Terminus (LTT); Sitapur Junction (LJN)
- Stops: 13
- Distance travelled: 1,492 km (927 mi)
- Average journey time: 25h 5m as 12107 & 25h 10m as 12108
- Service frequency: Tri-weekly (Note: Runs three days in a week for every direction.)
- Train number: 12107/12108

On-board services
- Classes: AC 2 tier, AC 3 tier, Sleeper Class, General Unreserved
- Seating arrangements: No
- Sleeping arrangements: Yes
- Catering facilities: On-board Catering; Pantry Car; E-Catering
- Observation facilities: LHB coach
- Entertainment facilities: No
- Baggage facilities: No
- Other facilities: Below the seats

Technical
- Rolling stock: 2
- Track gauge: 1,676 mm (5 ft 6 in)
- Electrification: Yes
- Operating speed: 59 km/h (37 mph), including halts

Lokmanya Tilak Terminus - Sitapur Junction Superfast Express is a Superfast train of the Indian Railways connecting Lokmanya Tilak Terminus Kurla in Maharashtra and Sitapur Junction of Uttar Pradesh. It is currently being operated with 12107/12108 train numbers on tri-weekly basis.

== Service ==
The 12107/Lokmanya Tilak Terminus - Sitapur Junction SF Express has an average speed of 59 km/h and covers 1492 km in 25h 5m. The 12108/Sitapur Junction - Lokmanya Tilak Terminus SF Express has an average speed of 59 km/h and covers 1492 km in 25h 10m.

== Route and halts ==
The important halts of the train are:

- Lokmanya Tilak Terminus
- Kalyan Junction
- Kasara
- Igatpuri
- Nasik Road
- Bhusaval Junction
- Bhopal Junction
- Lalitpur Junction
- Jhansi Junction
- Orai
- Kanpur Central
- Aishbagh Junction
- Mohibullapur
- Sidhauli
- Sitapur Junction

== Coach composite ==
The train has standard LHB rakes with a maximum speed of 110 km/h. The train consists of 22 coaches :

- 1 AC II Tier
- 4 AC III Tier
- 12 Sleeper Coaches
- 2 General
- 1 Pantry Car
- 1 Second-class Luggage/parcel van
- 1 EOG(End-On Generator)

== Traction ==
Both trains are hauled by a Bhusawal Loco Shed based WAP-4 electric locomotive from Kurla to Lucknow and vice versa.

== See also ==
- Udyognagri Express
- Mumbai LTT - Habibganj Superfast Express
- Lashkar Express
