= Ratnagiri Superfast Express =

Gorakhpur Superfast express (formerly known as Ratnagiri Superfast Express)
Overview
- Service type: Superfast Express
- Current operator: Central Railway zone

Route
- Termini: Lokmanya Tilak Terminus (LTT); Gorakhpur Junction (GKP)
- Stops: 18
- Distance travelled: 1,707 km (1,061 mi)
- Average journey time: 29 hours 50 minutes
- Service frequency: Three days (Note: Runs three days in a week for every direction.)
- Train number: 12165/12166

On-board services
- Classes: AC 2 tier, AC 3 tier, Sleeper Class, General Unreserved
- Seating arrangements: No
- Sleeping arrangements: Yes
- Catering facilities: Yes
- Entertainment facilities: No
- Baggage facilities: Below the seats

Technical
- Rolling stock: 2
- Track gauge: 1,676 mm (5 ft 6 in)
- Operating speed: 59 km/h (37 mph)

Ratnagiri Superfast Express is a Superfast Express train of the Indian Railways connecting Lokmanya Tilak Terminus in Maharashtra and Gorakhpur Junction of Uttar Pradesh. It is currently being operated with 12165/12166 train numbers on a three-day-a-week basis.

== Service ==
The 12165/Gorakhpur SF Express has an average speed of 57km/h and covers 1707km in 29 hrs 50 mins. 12166/Gorakhpur SF Express has an average speed of 59km/h and covers 1707km in 29 hrs 30 mins.

== Route and halts ==
The important halts of the train are:

- Lokmanya Tilak Terminus
- Thane
- Kalyan Junction
- Kasara
- Igatpuri
- Nasik Road
- Manmad Junction
- Jalgaon Junction
- Bhusaval Junction
- Itarsi Junction
- Jabalpur Junction
- Katni Junction
- Satna Junction
- Prayagraj Junction
- Janghai Junction
- Bhadohi
- Varanasi Junction
- Mau Junction
- Deoria Sadar
- Gorakhpur Junction

== Coach composition ==
The train has modern LHB coaches and runs at the max speed of 130 kmph. The train consists of 22 LHB coaches:

- 2 AC II Tier
- 6 AC III Tier
- 8 Sleeper Coaches
- 3 General
- 1 Pantry Car
- 1 General cum Brake van
- 1 EOG

Loco	1	2	3	4	5	6	7	8	9	10	11	12	13	14	15	16	17	18	19	20	21	22
	SLR	GS	S1	S2	S3	S4	S5	S6	S7	S8	PC	B1	B2	B3	B4	B5	B6	A1	S2	GS	GS	EOG

== Traction ==
Gorakhpur Express is mostly hauled by Kalyan-based WAP-7, From Prayagraj Junction the train is hauled by Gaziabad-based WAP-7 electric locomotive til Gorakhpur and vice versa.

== Direction reversal ==
The train reverses its direction two times:

- Prayagraj Junction

== Rake sharing ==
This train shares its rake with 22179/22180 Lokmanya Tilak Terminus–MGR Chennai Central Weekly Express.

== See also ==
- Lokmanya Tilak Terminus
- Varanasi Junction railway station
- Lokmanya Tilak Terminus–Varanasi Express
- Lokmanya Tilak Terminus–Gorakhpur Express
- Lokmanya Tilak Terminus–Chennai Central Weekly Express
