= Lokmanya Tilak Terminus–Madurai Express =

Overview
- Service type: Express
- Current operator: Central Railway zone

Route
- Termini: Lokmanya Tilak Terminus (LTT); Madurai Junction (MDU)
- Stops: 25
- Distance travelled: 1,694 km (1,053 mi)
- Average journey time: 28 hours 55 minutes
- Service frequency: Weekly (Note: Runs one day in a week for every direction.)
- Train number: 11043/11044

On-board services
- Classes: AC 2 Tier, AC 3 Tier, Sleeper class, General Unreserved
- Seating arrangements: No
- Sleeping arrangements: Yes
- Catering facilities: No
- Entertainment facilities: No

Technical
- Rolling stock: 2
- Track gauge: 1,676 mm (5 ft 6 in)
- Operating speed: 49 km/h (30 mph)
Route map
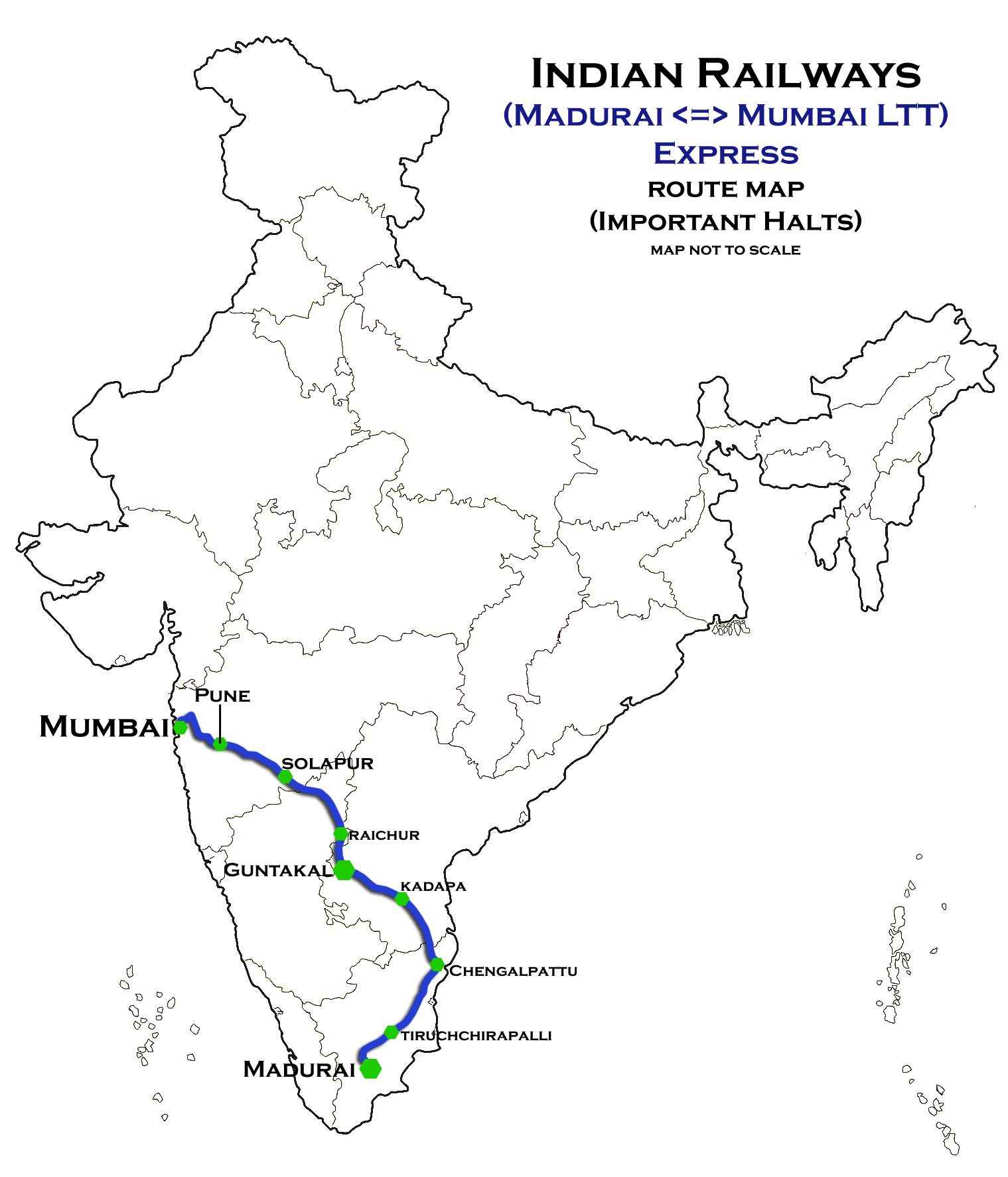

Lokmanya Tilak Terminus–Madurai Express is a Superfast train of the Indian Railways connecting Lokmanya Tilak Terminus in Mumbai, Maharashtra with Madurai Junction in Tamil Nadu. It is currently being operated with 11043/11044 train numbers on a weekly basis. From May 2021, it was converted into Superfast Express, with new timings. Also ICF coach were replaced by LHB coach.

== Service ==
The 22101/Lokmanya Tilak Terminus–Madurai Express has an average speed of 49 km/h and covers 1694 km in 28 hrs 55 mins. 22102/Madurai–Lokmanya Tilak Terminus Express has an average speed of 47 km/h and covers 1694 km in 28 hrs 40 mins.

== Schedule ==
Train number	Station code	Departure station	Departure time	Departure day	Arrival station code	Arrival station name	Arrival time	Arrival day
22101	LTT	Lokmanya Tilak Terminus	13:15	Wednesday	MDU	Madurai Junction	18:10	Thursday
22102	MDU	Madurai Junction	15:50	Friday	LTT	Lokmanya Tilak Terminus	20:30	Saturday

== Rake sharing ==
- 22129 – Tulsi Express
- 11081 – Lokmanya Tilak Terminus–Gorakhpur Express

== Route and halts ==
The important halts of the train are:

- Lokmanya Tilak Terminus
- Thane
- Kalyan Junction
- Karjat
- Lonavala
- Pune Junction
- Daund Junction
- Solapur
- Kalaburagi Junction
- Wadi Junction
- Guntakal Junction
- Renigunta Junction
- Arakkonam Junction
- Kanchipuram
- Chengalpattu Junction
- Viluppuram Junction
- Tiruchirappalli Junction
- Dindigul Junction
- Madurai Junction

== Coach composition ==
The train consists of 23 coaches:

- 1 AC Two Tier
- 4 AC Three Tier
- 12 Sleeper coaches
- 3 General Unreserved
- 2 End-On Generator coaches (EOG)

== Traction ==
Both trains are hauled by a Kalyan Loco Shed-based WAP 7 electric locomotive from Kurla to Madurai.
