= Lokmanya Tilak Terminus–Patliputra Express =

Mumbai LTT - Patliputra S.F Express
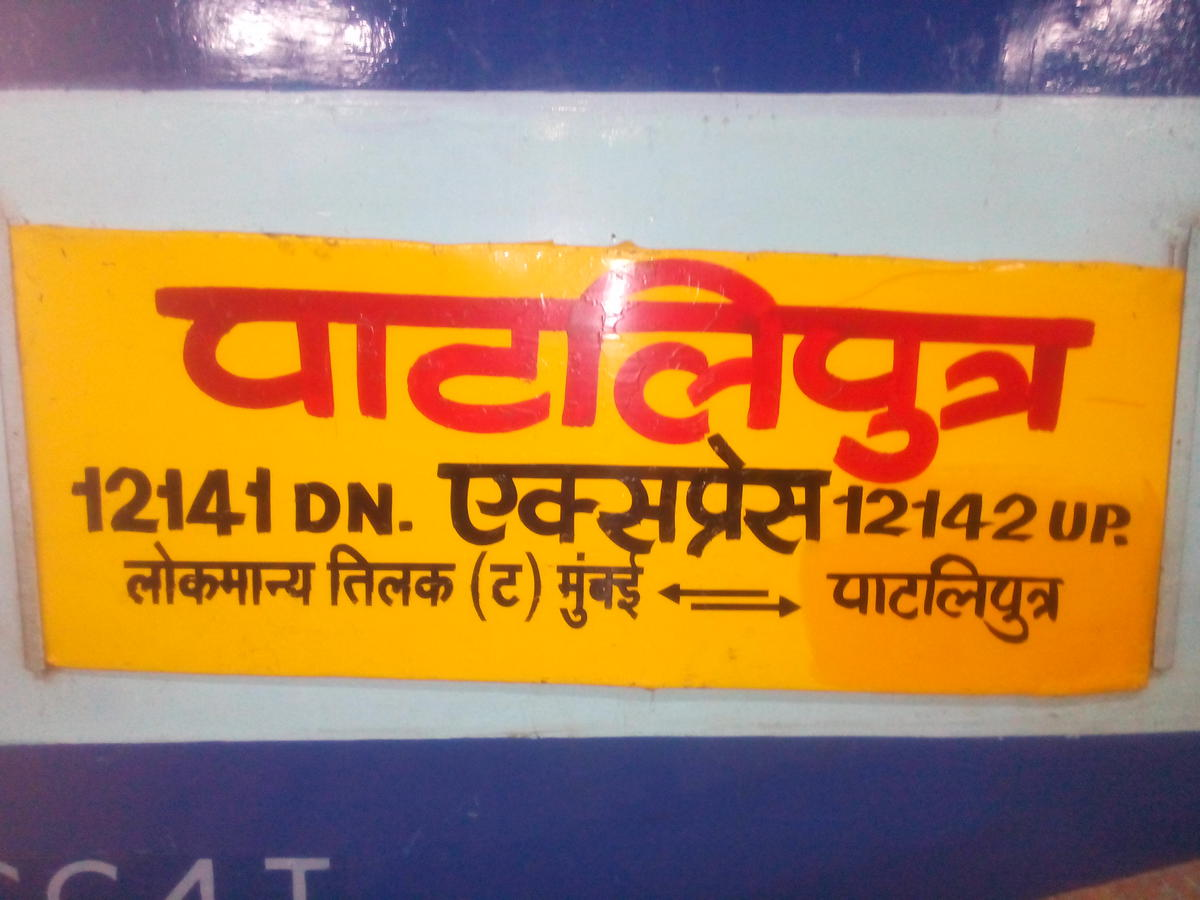

Overview
- Service type: Superfast Express
- Locale: Maharashtra, Madhya Pradesh, Uttar Pradesh, Bihar
- First service: 04 July 1999
- Current operator: Central Railways of Indian Railways

Route
- Termini: Mumbai LTT (LTT); Patliputra (PPTA)
- Stops: 15 (2 technical stops)
- Distance travelled: 1,689 km (1,049 mi)
- Average journey time: 28 hrs 15 min
- Service frequency: Daily
- Train number: 12141 UP / 12142 DN

On-board services
- Classes: AC 1 Tier, AC 2 Tier, AC 3 Tier, Sleeper 3 Tier, Unreserved
- Seating arrangements: Yes
- Sleeping arrangements: Yes
- Catering facilities: Yes

Technical
- Rolling stock: LHB coach
- Operating speed: 60 km/h (37 mph) average with halts

Lokmanya Tilak Terminus - Patliputra S. F Express, with train numbers 12141 and 12142, is a daily Superfast express train service run by Indian Railways and maintained by Central Railway. It runs between Lokmanya Tilak Terminus in Mumbai, Maharashtra and Patliputra Junction in Patna, Bihar. It is one of several train services allowing direct train travel between Mumbai and Patna.

== History ==
This train service was started in 1999 to facilitate the transportation of passengers from Mumbai to Patna. When it was introduced in 1999, the train was run bi-weekly, and from Lokmanya Tilak Terminus to Patna Junction, with only two commercial halts, Jabalpur and Mughalsarai Junction. When the Rajendranagar Terminal was inaugurated in 2003, service was extended from Patna Junction to Rajendra Nagar Terminal. In 2009, service was shifted from Lokmanya Tilak Terminus to Mumbai CST, which was again shifted to Lokmanya Tilak Terminus for operational reasons. On 1 January 2016, service from Patna side was shifted from Rajendra Nagar Terminal to Patliputra Junction, which is the current iteration of this train.

== Timings ==
12141 service starts from Lokmanya Tilak Terminus at 11:35 PM and arrives Patliputra Junction railway station at 03:50 AM on the third day.

12142 service starts from Patliputra Junction at 11:05 AM and arrives Lokmanya Tilak Terminus at 02:10 PM on the next day.

Timings are subject to change at the discretion of Indian Railways.

== Halts ==
12141 Lokmanya Tilak Terminus - Patliputra Express
Station	Additional Information
Lokmanya Tilak Terminus	Source
Thane	
Kalyan Jn	
Kasara	Technical Halt for Banker Attachment
Igatpuri	Technical Halt for Banker Detachment
Nashik Road	
Manmad Jn	
Jalgaon Jn	Halt Only for 12141 service
Bhusaval Jn	
Itarsi Jn	
Jabalpur	
Satna Jn	
Prayagraj Chheoki Jn	
Pt Deen Dayal Upadhyaya Jn	
Zamania	
Buxar	
Ara Jn	
Danapur	
Patliputra Junction	Destination

== Coach composition ==
This train has 23 LHB coaches consisting of:

- 1 AC First Class cum AC Two Tier
- 2 AC Two Tier
- 6 AC Three Tier
- 8 Sleeper Class
- 1 AC Buffet Car (Pantry Car)
- 2 General Second Class
- 1 Divyangjan coach cum Luggage and Brake Van
- 1 Luggage Brake and Generator Car
- 1 High Capacity Parcel Van

The format is as follows:

Loco	1	2	3	4	5	6	7	8	9	10	11	12	13	14	15	16	17	18	19	20	21	22	23
	HCPV	EOG	GS	S8	S7	S6	S5	S4	S3	S2	S1	PC	B6	B5	B4	B3	B2	B1	A2	A1	HA1	GS	SLR

Final coach composition is at the discretion of Indian Railways.

There are 4 rakes of this service, operated in a rake sharing arrangement (RSA) with 11099/11100 Lokmanya Tilak Terminus - Madgaon Express. All the rakes are maintained at Lokmanya Tilak Terminus coach depot.

== Locomotive ==
A head on generation equipped WAP-7 locomotive from Kalyan Electric Loco Shed hauls the service from Lokmanya Tilak Terminus to Patliputra Junction. Locomotive is subject to change based on availability.

Before 100% electrification of the route, this service used to have loco change at Igatpuri for DC to AC electric locomotive change, and at Itarsi Junction for electric to diesel locomotive change.

== See also ==
- Lokmanya Tilak Terminus–Gorakhpur Express
- Pune - Danapur Superfast Express
- Lokmanya Tilak Terminus – Sultanpur Express
