= Lokmanya Tilak Terminus–Varanasi Express =

Passenger train in India

Lokmanya Tilak Terminus–Banaras Express
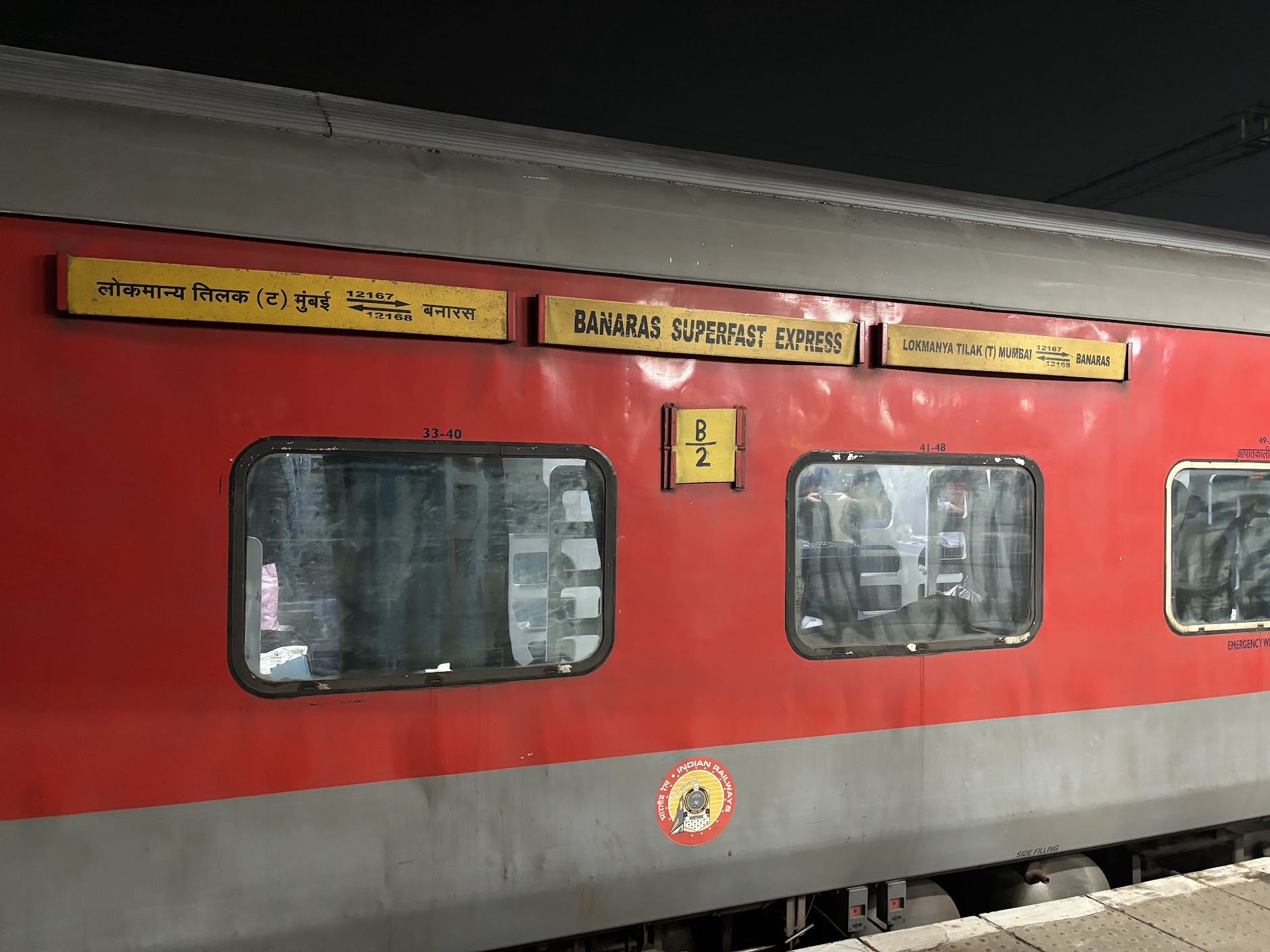

Overview
- Service type: Express
- First service: 23 December 2009; 16 years ago
- Current operator: Central Railway

Route
- Termini: Lokmanya Tilak Terminus (LTT); Varanasi (BSBS)
- Stops: 13
- Distance travelled: 1,499 km (931 mi)
- Average journey time: 26 hours 50 minutes
- Service frequency: Daily (Note: Runs seven days in a week for every direction.)
- Train number: 12167/12168

On-board services
- Classes: AC 2 tier, AC 3 tier, Sleeper Class, General Unreserved
- Seating arrangements: No
- Sleeping arrangements: Yes
- Catering facilities: On-board Catering
- Entertainment facilities: No
- Baggage facilities: Below the seats

Technical
- Rolling stock: 2
- Track gauge: 1,676 mm (5 ft 6 in)
- Operating speed: 58 km/h (36 mph)

Lokmanya Tilak Terminus–Banaras Express is an express train of the Indian Railways connecting Lokmanya Tilak Terminus in Maharashtra and Banaras of Uttar Pradesh. It is currently being operated with 12167/12168 train numbers on a daily basis. The train is converted ICF coaches into LHB coaches in year 2023.

== Service ==
The 12167/Lokmanya Tilak Terminus–Banaras Express has an average speed of 55 km/h and covers 1475 km in 26 hrs 50 mins. 12168/Banaras–Lokmanya Tilak Terminus Express has an average speed of 58 km/h and covers 1496 km in 26 hrs 20 mins.

== Route and halts ==
The important halts of the train are:

- Lokmanya Tilak Terminus
- Kalyan Junction
- Kasara
- Igatpuri
- Nasik Road
- Bhusaval Junction
- Itarsi Junction
- Pipariya
- Jabalpur Junction
- Katni Junction
- Satna Junction
- Manikpur Junction
- Prayagraj Chheoki
- Varanasi Junction
- Banaras

== Coach composite ==
The train has standard LHB rakes with max speed of 160 kmph. The train consists of 24 coaches :

- 1 AC I Tier + II Tier
- 1 AC II Tier

9 AC III Tier

- 3 Sleeper Coaches
- 4 General
- 1 Pantry Car
- 2 Second-class Luggage/parcel van

== Traction ==
Both trains are hauled by an Electric Loco Shed, Itarsi based WAP-7 electric locomotive from Lokmanya Tilak Terminus to Banaras and vice versa.

== See also ==
- Lokmanya Tilak Terminus
- Varanasi Junction railway station
- Ratnagiri Superfast Express
- Lokmanya Tilak Terminus–Gorakhpur Express
