= Visakhapatnam–Lokmanya Tilak Terminus Express =

Visakhapatnam – Lokmanya Tilak Terminus Express
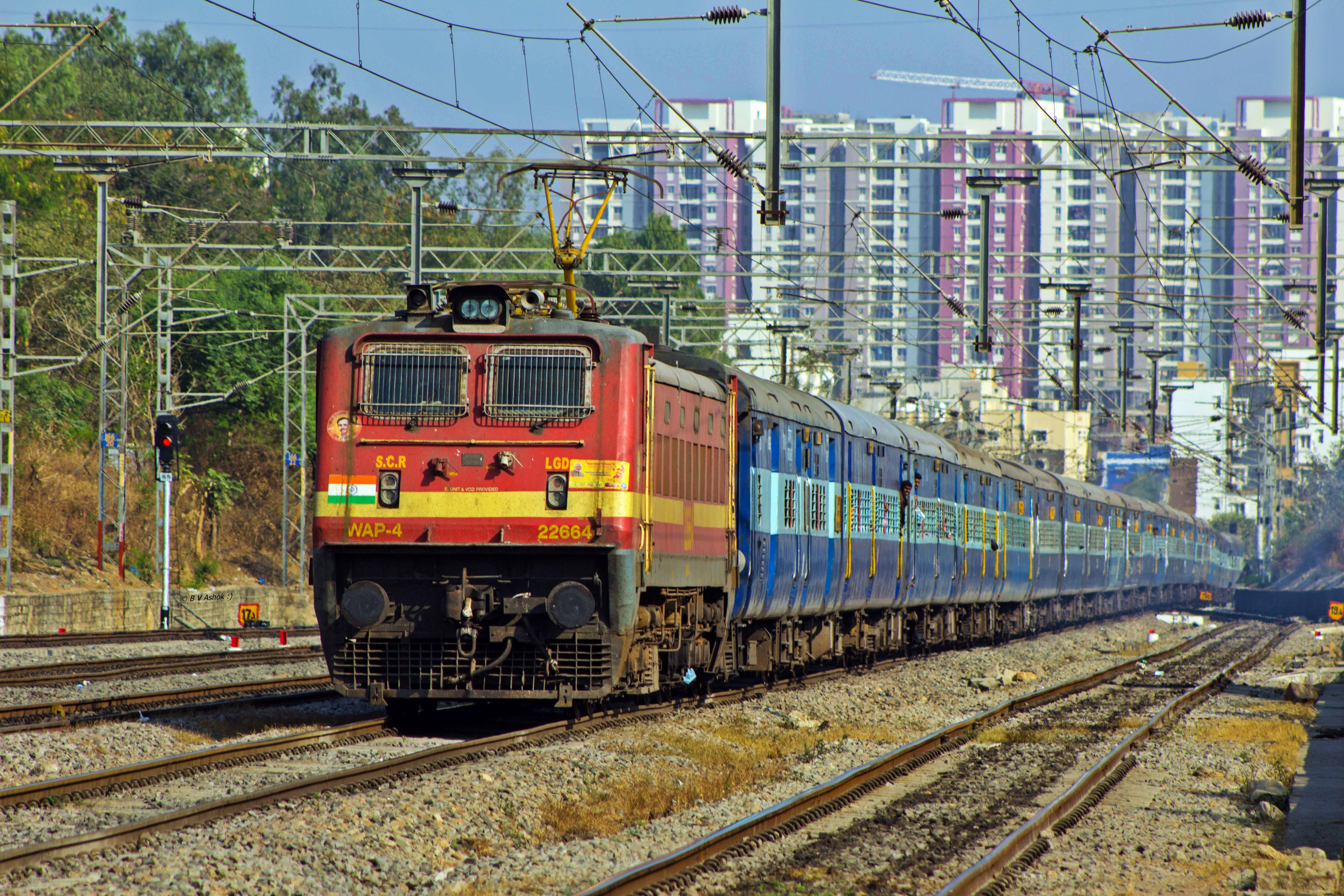
- 18519 Visakhapatnam – Mumbai LTT Express at Lingampalli

Overview
- Service type: Express
- Status: Operating
- Locale: Andhra Pradesh, Telangana, Karnataka, Maharashtra
- First service: 24 March 2010; 16 years ago
- Current operator: South Coast Railway

Route
- Termini: Visakhapatnam Junction; Lokmanya Tilak Terminus
- Stops: 18
- Distance travelled: 1,498.5 km (931.1 mi)
- Average journey time: 29 hours (Average)
- Service frequency: Daily
- Train number: 18519/18520

On-board services
- Classes: Sleeper, Ac 1,2,3 General
- Seating arrangements: Yes
- Sleeping arrangements: Yes
- Catering facilities: No Food/Catering
- Baggage facilities: Below the seats

Technical
- Rolling stock: One
- Track gauge: Broad (1,676 mm)
- Operating speed: 59 km/h (Average)
Route map
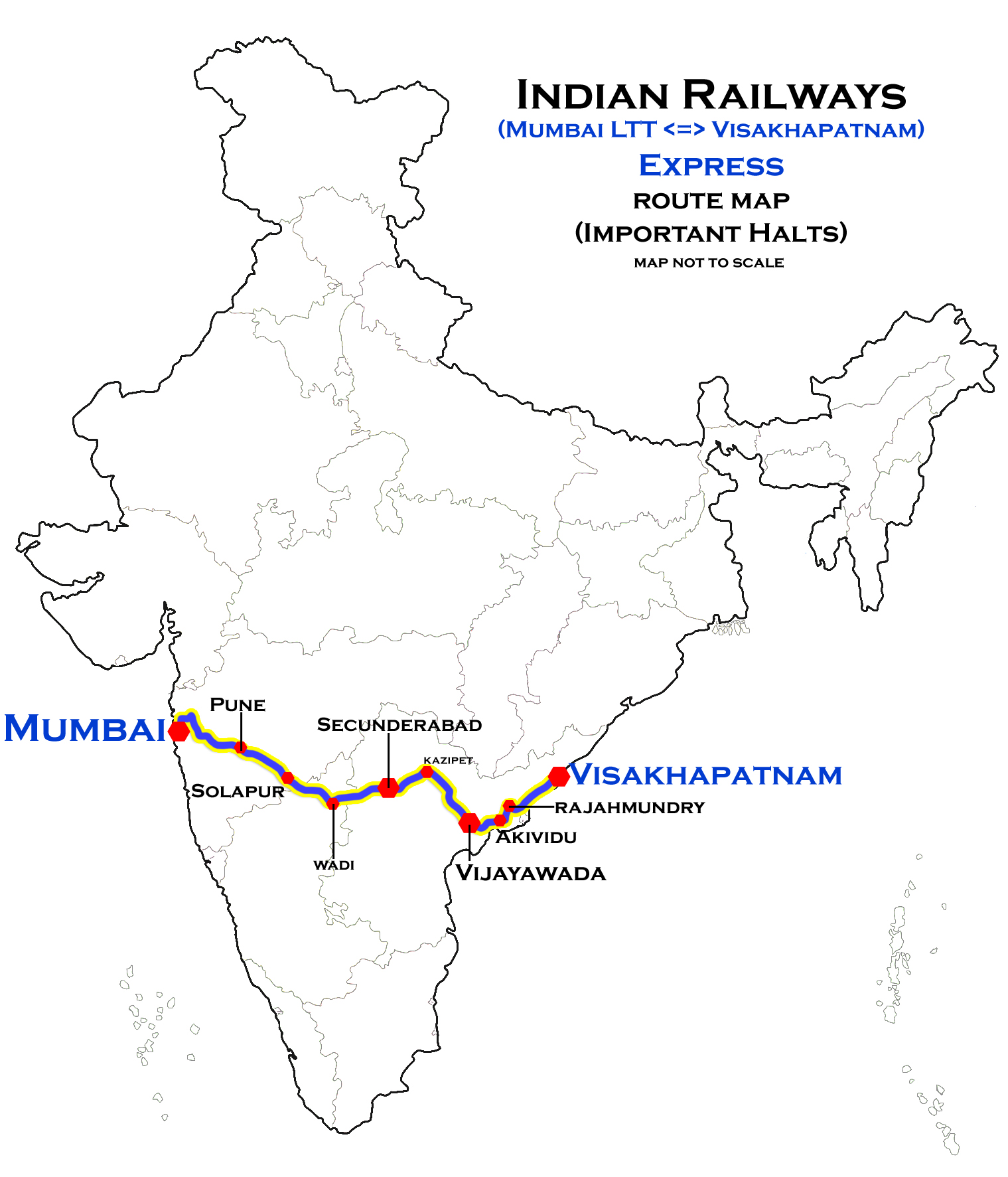

The Visakhapatnam – Lokmanya Tilak Terminus Express is a daily Express train service of the Indian Railways. It was launched on 24 March 2010.

Daggubati Purandeswari, Union Minister of State for Human Resources, flagged off the train at Visakhapatnam railway station in the presence of the local MLAs, MPs of Vizag district and East Coast Railway officials.

This train is presently operated by the South Coast Railway of Indian Railways. The train runs between Visakhapatnam Junction and Lokmanya Tilak Terminus covering 1,498.5 km (931.1 mi) in 29 hours and 15 minutes and from Lokmanya Tilak Terminus to Visakhapatnam in 28 hours and 20 minutes.

The train was earlier numbered as 12749 and 12750. The train frequency was changed from Bi-weekly to Daily as presented in the Railway Budget 2013–14. But From 10 September 2013 onwards reducing the status of 12749/12750 Visakhapatnam-Mumbai LTT from SF to 'ordinary express' renumbered as 18519/18520. The train no. 22847/22848 passing through same starting point VSKP and ending point LTT via Nagpur is weekly SF passing through Nagpur Junction, Manmad Junction and Nashik Road.

== Train details ==
=== Stoppages ===
Train number 18519 stops at Samalkot Jn, Rajahmundry, Tanuku, Bhimavaram, Akividu, Kaikaluru, Gudivada, Vijayawada Junction, Kazipet, Moula Ali, Secunderabad Junction, Lingampalli, Vikarabad, Tandur, Wadi, Gulbarga, Solapur and Pune en route to Lokmanya Tilak Terminus. Train no 18520 stops at the same stations, but the other way around.

=== Coach composition ===
The train consists of One First Class Ac + One Two Tier AC coach+ Three Three tier AC coach, ten Sleeper Class coaches, Six Unreserved General coaches and two Unreserved Luggage cum Sleeper Coaches.

=== Loco links ===
The train is regularly hauled by WDP4D locomotive from LTT to Wadi to Vijayawada Junction with WAP4 / WAP7 again at Vijayawada WDP4D with a loco reversal at Vijayawada.

== Sources ==
1. flagged off article on THE HINDU
2. India-Rail-Info article on Visakhapatnam-MumbaiLTT SF Express
3. article on THE HINDU reducing the status from sf to exp
4. 18519 Time Table from indiarailinfo
