= Lokmanya Tilak Terminus–Azamgarh Weekly Express =

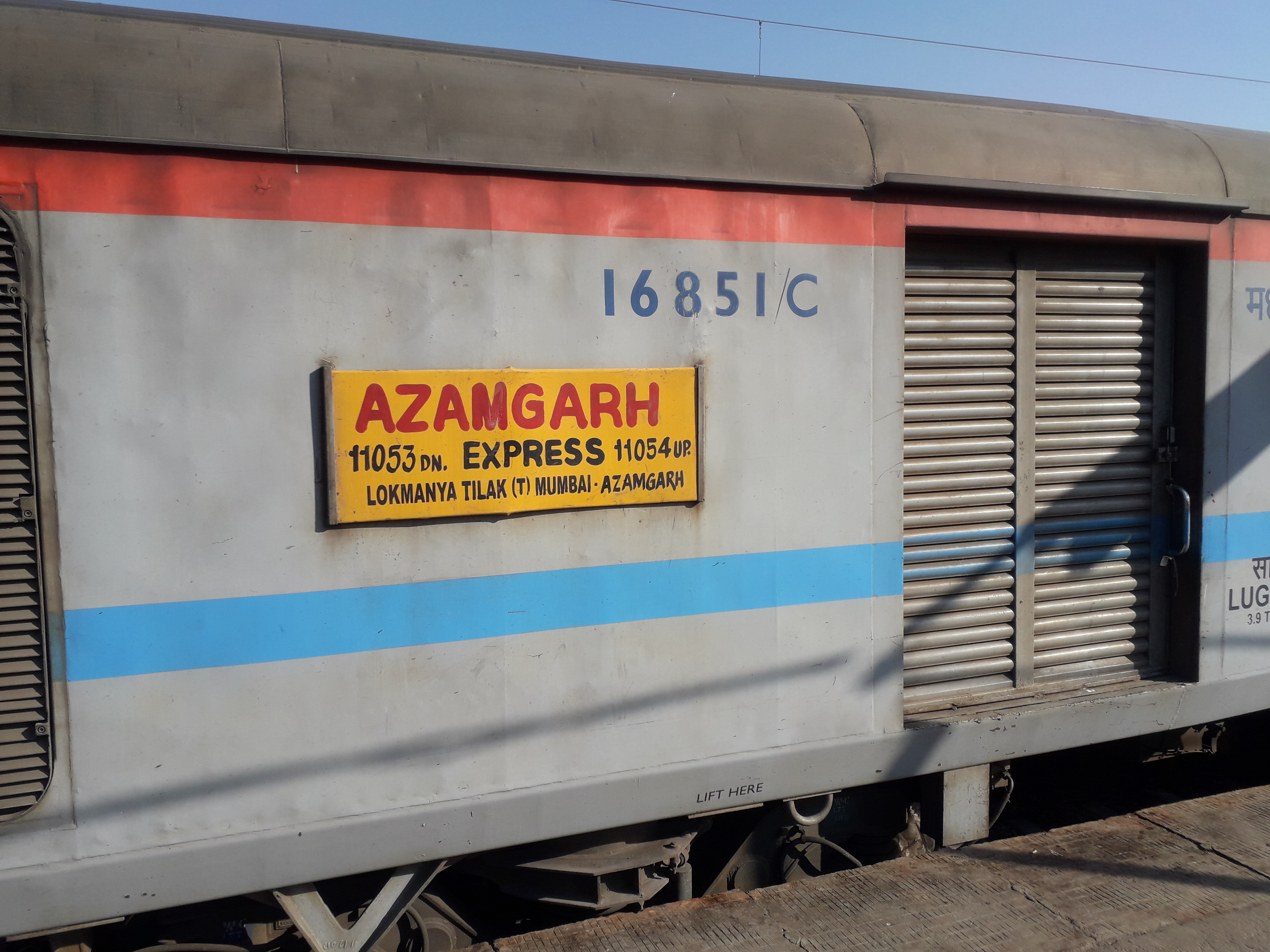

Overview
- Service type: Express
- Status: Permanently Cancelled
- Locale: Maharashtra, Madhya Pradesh, and Uttar Pradesh
- First service: 13 December 2014; 11 years ago
- Last service: March 2020 (due to COVID-19)
- Current operator: Central Railway zone

Route
- Termini: Lokmanya Tilak Terminus (LTT); Azamgarh (AMH)
- Stops: 12
- Distance travelled: 1,546 km (961 mi)
- Average journey time: 33 hours 35 minutes
- Service frequency: Weekly (Note: Runs one days in a week for every direction.)
- Train number: 11053/11054

On-board services
- Classes: AC 2 Tier, AC 3 Tier, Sleeper, Unreserved
- Seating arrangements: No
- Sleeping arrangements: Yes
- Catering facilities: No
- Entertainment facilities: No

Technical
- Rolling stock: 2
- Track gauge: 1,676 mm (5 ft 6 in)
- Operating speed: 46 km/h (29 mph)

Lokmanya Tilak Terminus–Azamgarh Weekly Express is an Express train of the Indian Railways connecting Lokmanya Tilak Terminus in Maharashtra and Azamgarh of Uttar Pradesh. It is currently being operated with 11053/11054 train numbers on a weekly basis.

== Service ==
- 11053/Mumbai LTT–Azamgarh Weekly Express has an average speed of 46 km/h and covers 1546 km in 33 hrs 35 mins
- 11054/Azamgarh–Mumbai LTT Weekly Express has an average speed of 50 km/h and covers 1546 km in 33 hrs 50 mins.

== Route and halts ==
The important halts of the train are:

- Lokmanya Tilak Terminus
- Thane
- Kalyan Junction
- Nasik Road
- Bhusaval Junction
- Harda
- Itarsi Junction
- Jabalpur Junction
- Satna Junction
- Allahabad Junction
- Janghai Junction
- Jaunpur Junction
- Shahganj Junction
- Azamgarh

== Coach composition ==
The train consists of 22 coaches (LHB RAKES):

- 1 AC II Tier
- 4 AC III Tier
- 10 Sleeper coaches
- 5 General
- 2 EOG

== Traction ==
Both trains are hauled by an Itarsi-based WAP-4 electric locomotive from Lokmanya Tilak Terminus to Jabalpur Junction handing over to another Itarsi-based WDM-3A diesel locomotive up to Azamgarh.

== Direction reversal ==
The train reverses its direction once:

- Allahabad Junction

== Rake sharing ==
This train shares its rake with 12143/12144 Lokmanya Tilak Terminus–Sultanpur Express.

== Timing ==
- 11053 – Starts Lokmanya Tilak Terminus every Wednesday at 4:40 PM IST and reaches Azamgarh on Friday 2:10 PM IST
- 11054 – Starts Azamgarh at 5:20 AM IST on Friday and reaches Lokmanya Tilak Terminus 12:15 PM IST on 2nd day

== Gallery ==
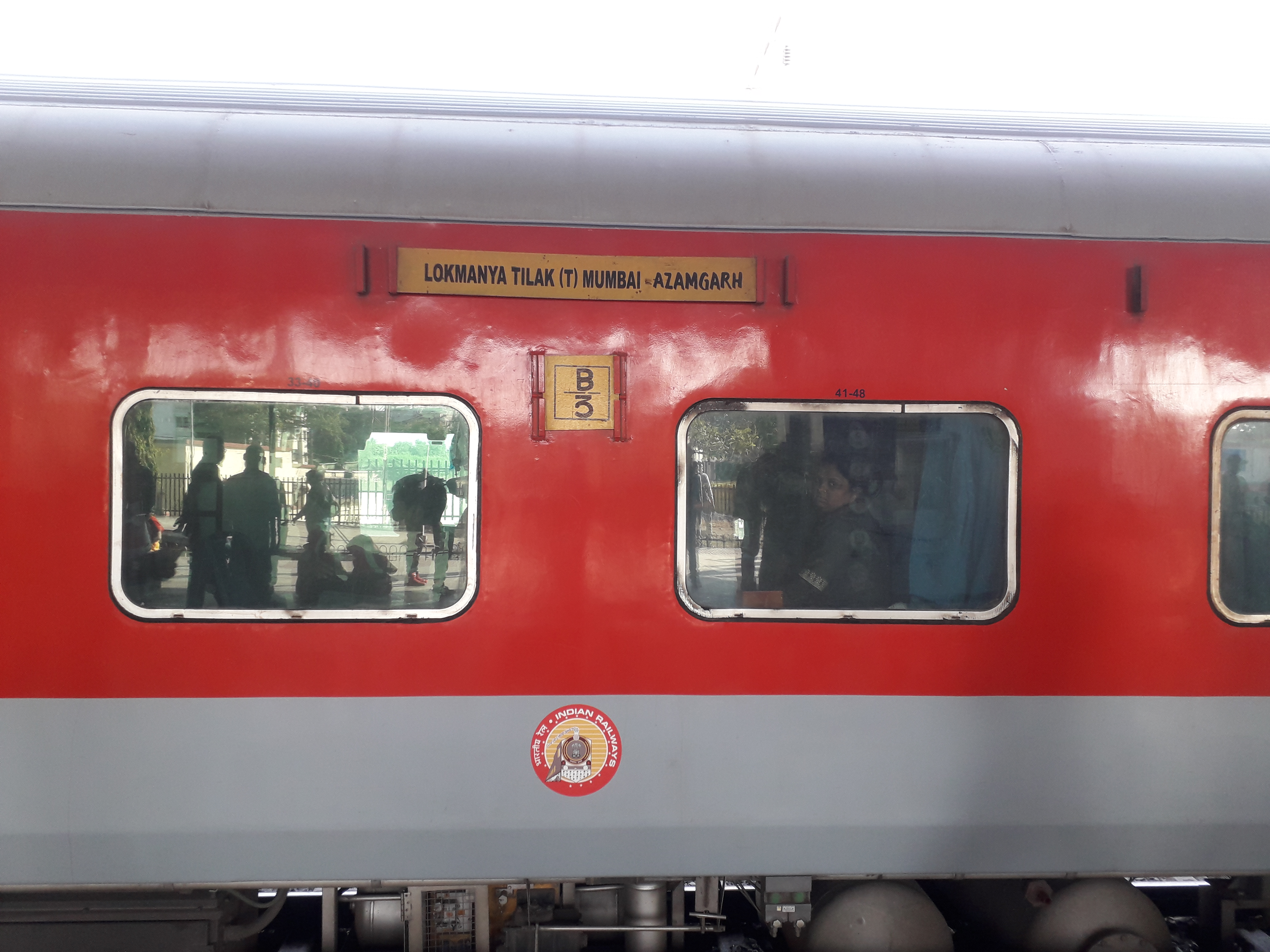
11054 Azamgarh–Mumbai LTT Weekly Express – AC 3 tier

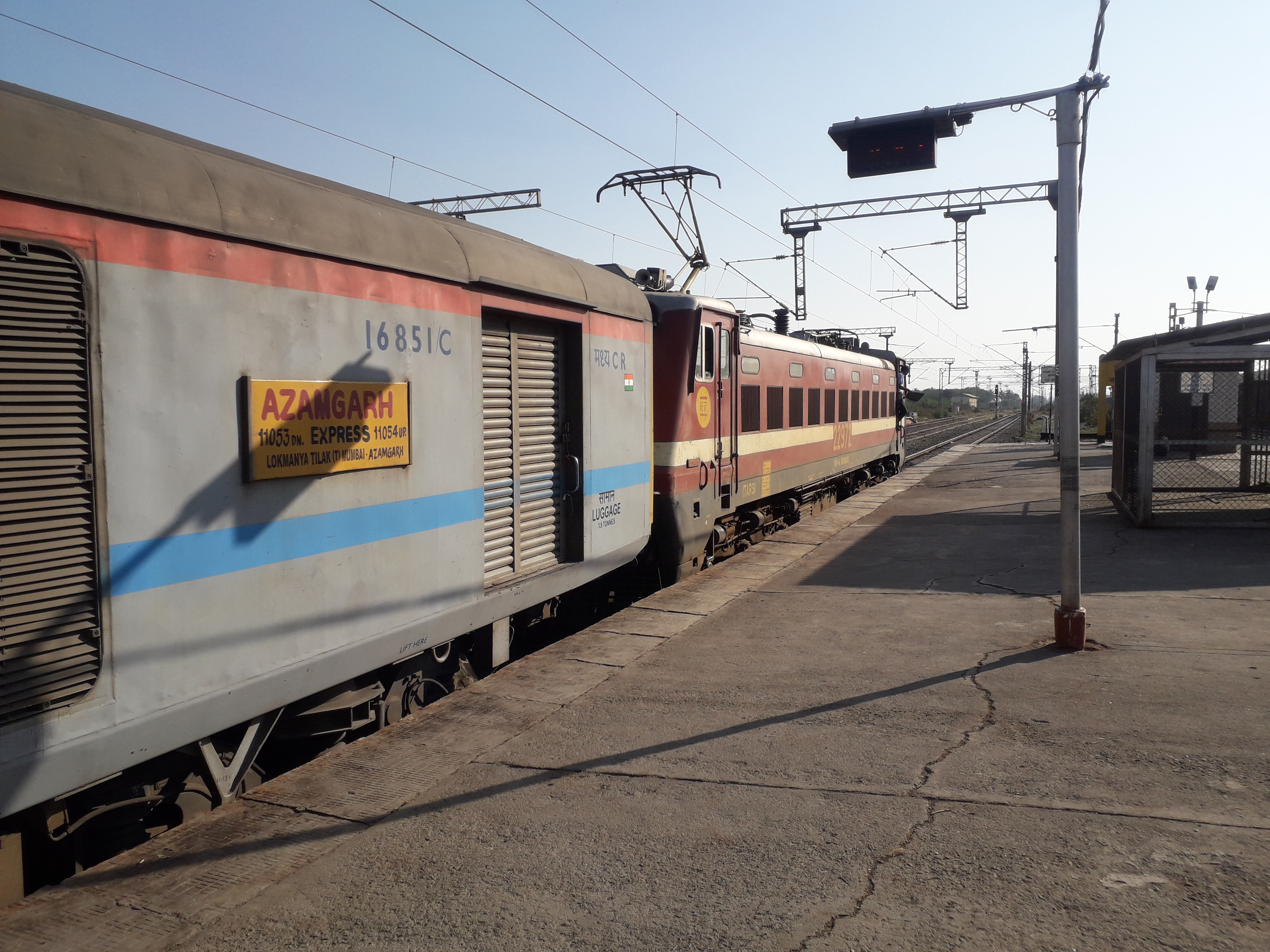
11054 Azamgarh–Mumbai LTT Weekly Express with Itarsi Junction WAP-4

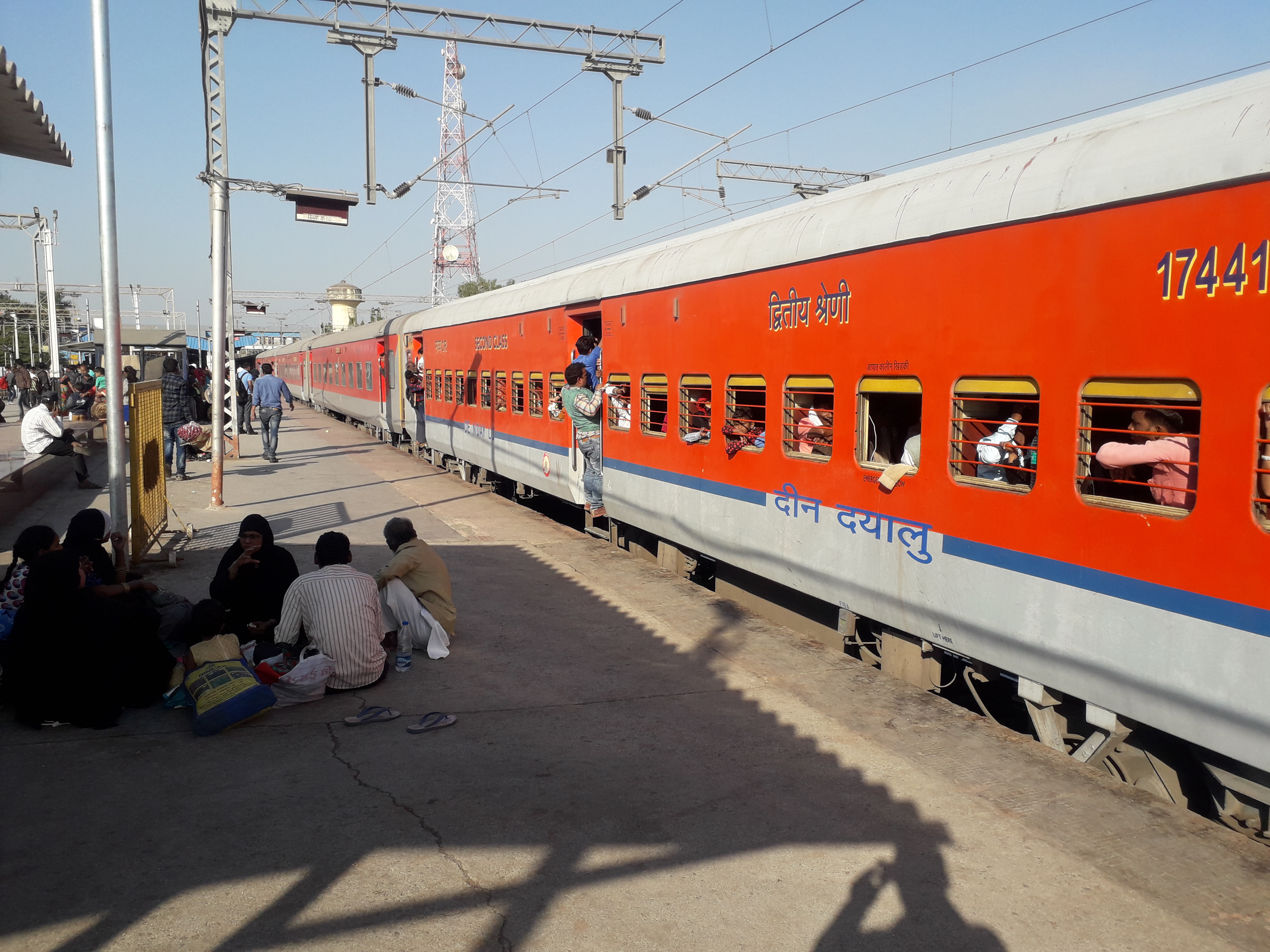
11054 Azamgarh–Mumbai LTT Weekly Express – General Deen Dayalu coach

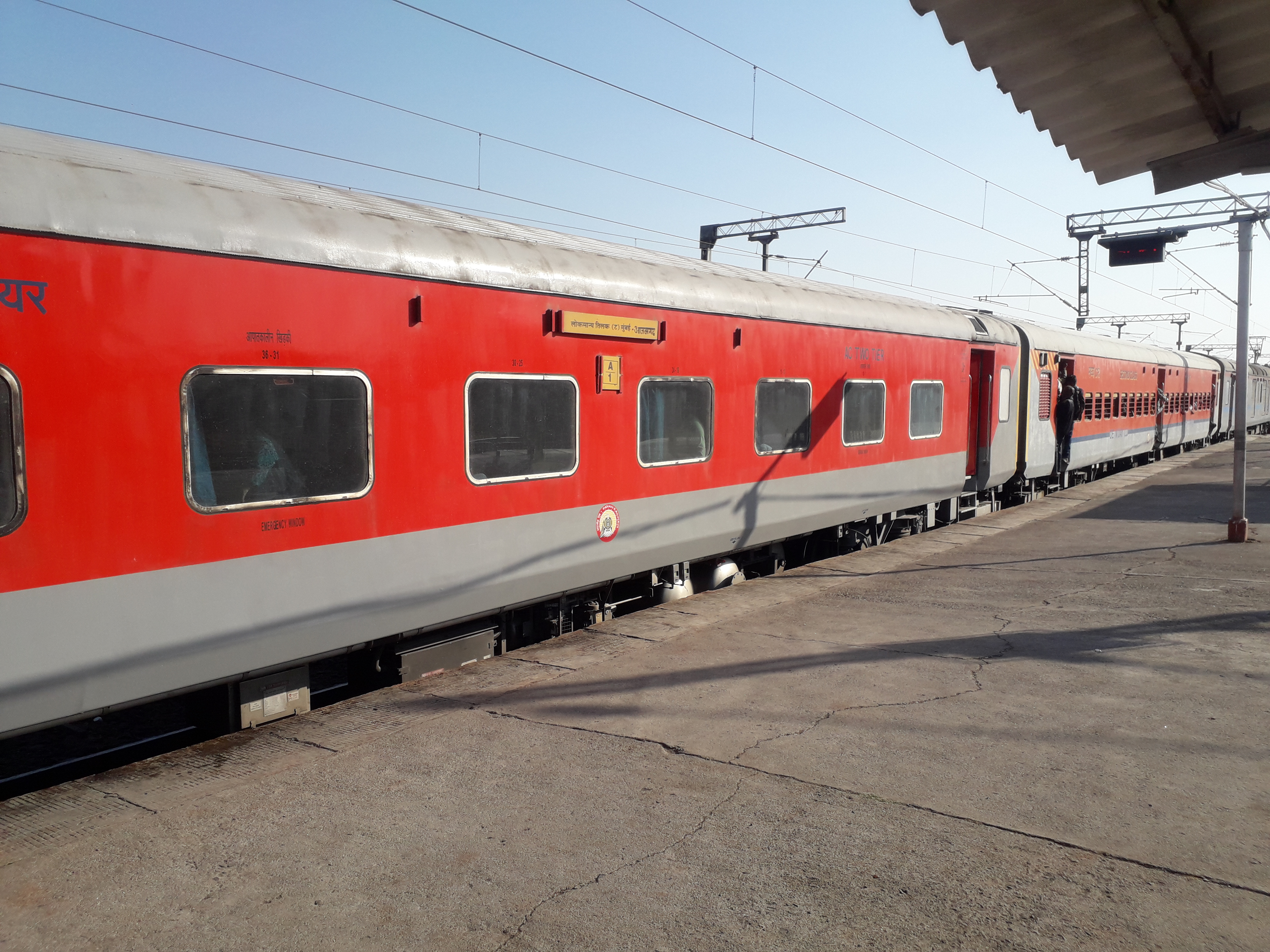
11054 Azamgarh–Mumbai LTT Weekly Express – AC 2 tier

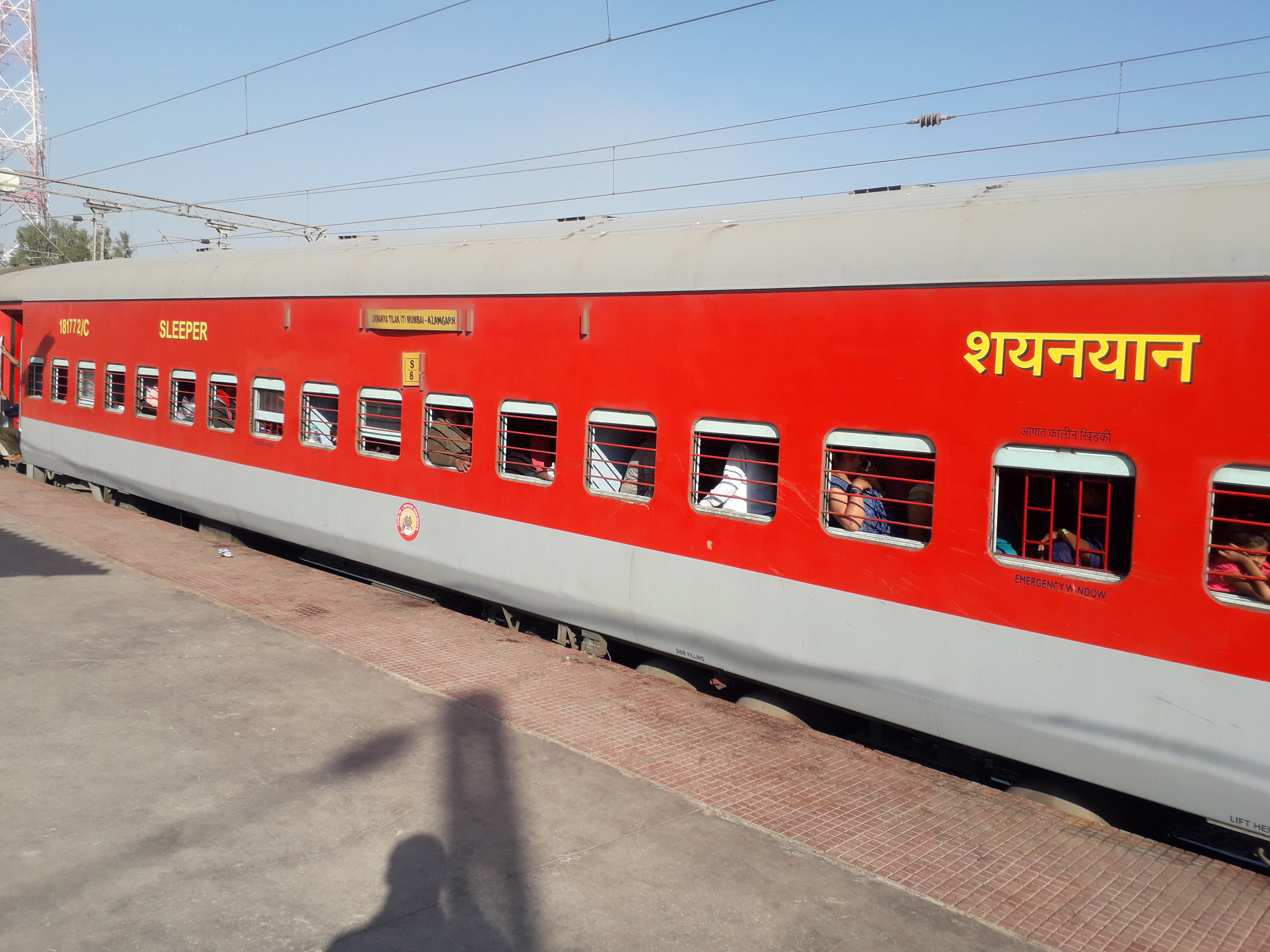
11054 Azamgarh –Mumbai LTT Weekly Express – Sleeper class coach
