= Lokmanya Tilak Terminus–Coimbatore Express =

Lokmanya Tilak Terminus - Coimbatore Express
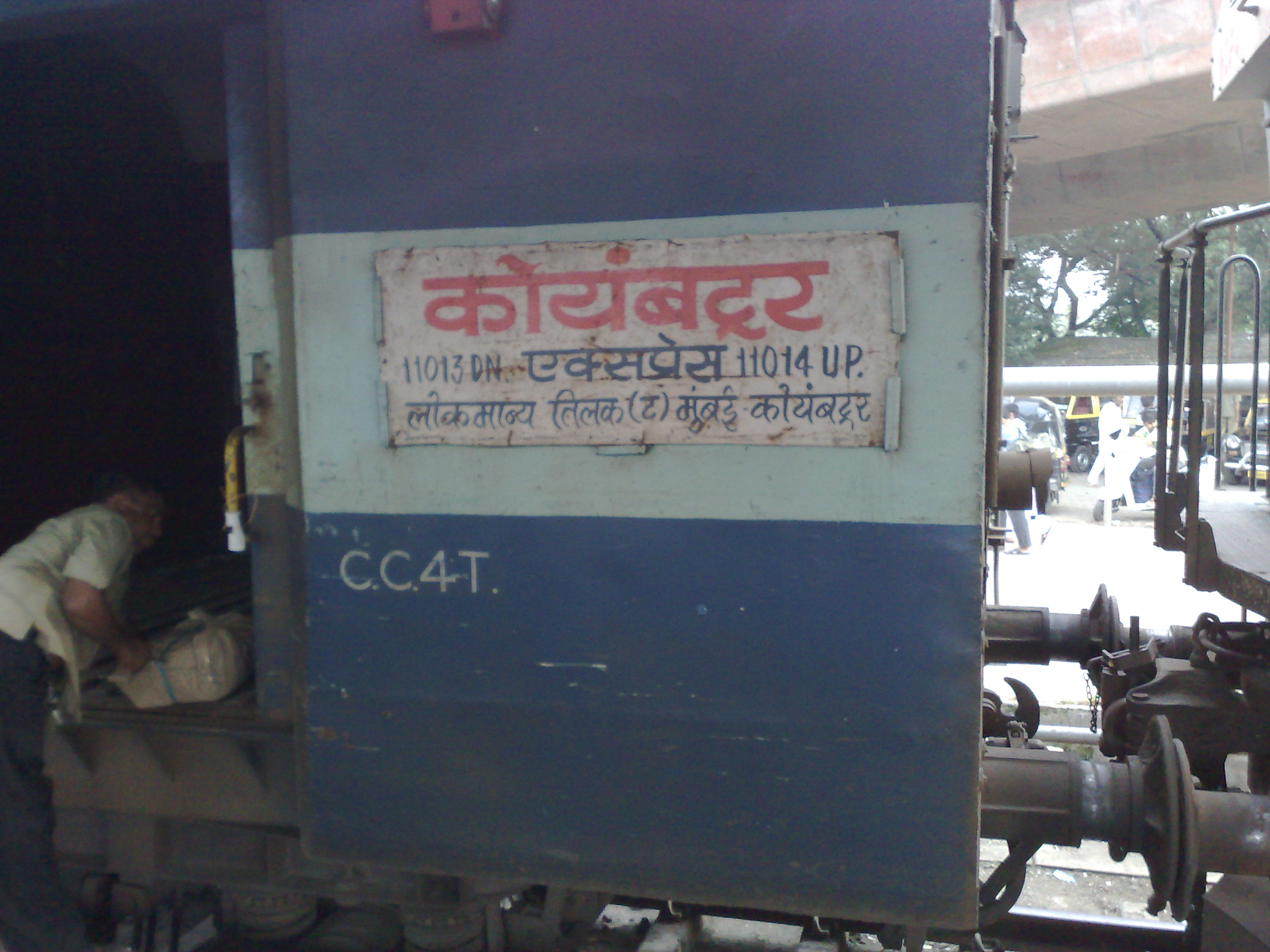

Overview
- Service type: Mail / Express
- First service: 1 July 1992; 33 years ago
- Current operator: Central Railway zone

Route
- Termini: Lokmanya Tilak Terminus (LTT); Coimbatore Junction (CBE)
- Stops: 34
- Distance travelled: 1,514 km (941 mi)
- Average journey time: 32 hours 25 minutes
- Service frequency: Daily (Note: Runs seven days in a week for every direction.)
- Train number: 11013/11014

On-board services
- Classes: AC 1st, Ac 2 Tier, AC 3 Tier, Sleeper 3 Tier, Unreserved
- Seating arrangements: Yes
- Sleeping arrangements: Yes
- Catering facilities: Yes
- Entertainment facilities: No

Technical
- Rolling stock: 2
- Track gauge: 1,676 mm (5 ft 6 in)
- Operating speed: 47 km/h (29 mph)
Route map
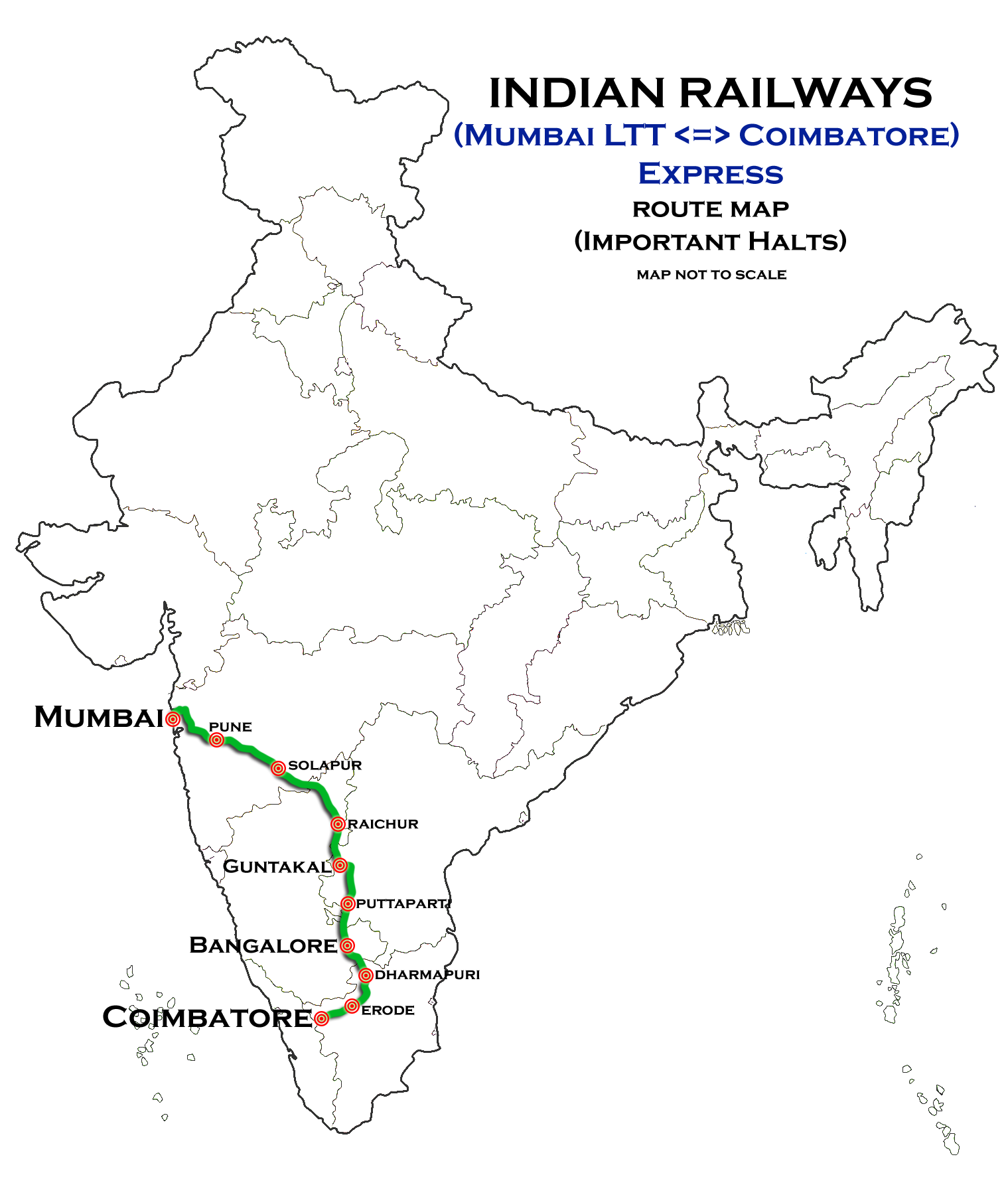

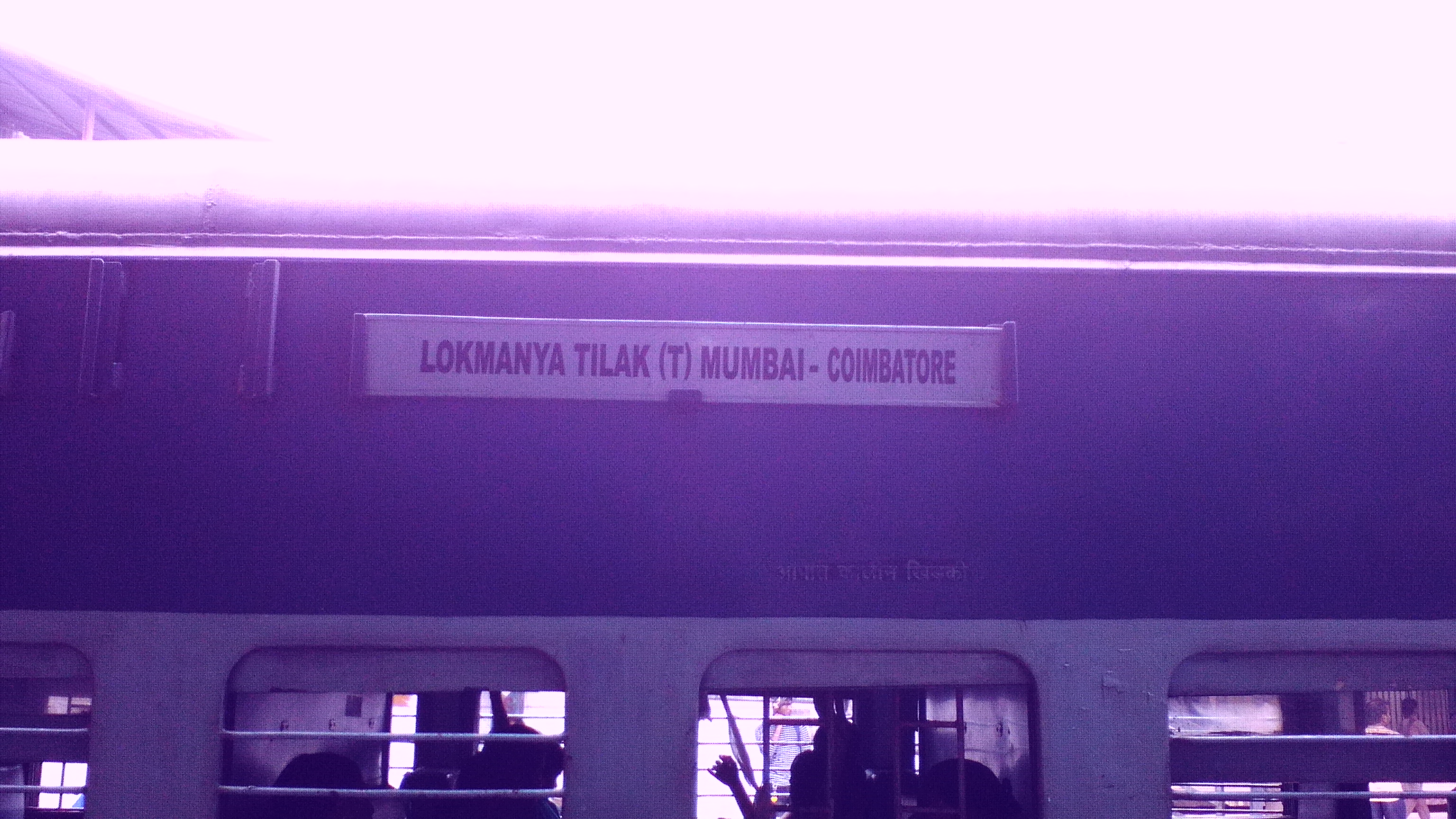
Coachboard of Mumbai LTT Coimbatore Express

Lokmanya Tilak Terminus–Coimbatore Express (train number: 11013/11014) is a daily express train of Indian Railways and operated by Central Railway zone, running between Lokmanya Tilak Terminus (Mumbai) and Coimbatore Junction.

== Schedule ==
Train number 11013 starts from Lokmanya Tilak Terminus at 22:35 hours and reaches Coimbatore at 06:50 hours on the third day. Train number 11014 leaves Coimbatore Junction at 08:50 hours and reaches Lokmanya Tilak Terminus at 13:45 hours.

== Rakes ==
The train has 1 AC first class, 1 AC two-tier, 5 AC three-tier, 8 sleeper classes, 1 pantry car, 4 general second class coaches and 2 generator/luggage cars. The train has been equipped with LHB coaches.

== Traction ==
This train was hauled by Krishnarajapuram Loco Shed WAP-7 electric locomotive from Coimbatore to KSR Bengaluru and from KSR Bengaluru till Lokmanya Tilak Terminus, this train is hauled by Kalyan Loco Shed WAP-7 or Erode WAP-7 and vice versa.

== Route and halts ==
The important halts of the train are:

- Lokmanya Tilak Terminus
- Thane
- Kalyan Junction
- Pune Junction
- Kurduvadi Junction
- Solapur
- Wadi Junction
- Raichur
- Guntakal Junction
- Dharmavaram Junction
- Bangalore City
- Hosur
- Dharmapuri
- Salem Junction
- Erode Junction
- Tiruppur
- Coimbatore Junction

== Direction reversal ==
Train Reverses its direction 1 times:

- Bangalore City

== See also ==
- Famous trains
- Bikaner - Coimbatore SF AC Express
- Mumbai CSMT - Kanniyakumari Jayanti Janta Express
- Kurla
