= Haddinagundu railway station =

Railway station in Karnataka

Haddinagundu

General information
- Location: National Highway 63, Haddinagundu, Ballari district, Karnataka; India
- Coordinates: 15°09′12″N 76°58′45″E
- Elevation: 434 metres (1,424 ft)
- System: Indian Railways station
- Owner: Indian Railways
- Operator: South Coast Railway
- Line: Guntakal–Vasco da Gama line
- Platforms: 2
- Tracks: Double Electric-Line

Construction
- Structure type: Standard (on ground)

Other information
- Status: Functioning
- Station code: HDD
- Zone(s): South Coast Railway zone
- Division(s): Guntakal

Services
Preceding station	Indian Railways	Following station
Hagari towards ?	South Coast Railway zone Guntakal–Vasco da Gama section	Ballari Junction towards ?
Location
- Interactive map

Haddinagundu railway station is a railway station located on the Guntakal–Vasco da Gama line operated by the South Coast Railway zone under Guntakal railway division. It is situated beside National Highway 63 at Haddinagundu in Ballari district in the Indian state of Karnataka.
