= T. Sakibanda railway station =

Railway station in Andhra Pradesh

T. Sakibanda

General information
- Location: National Highway 63, Kurnool district, Andhra Pradesh; India
- Coordinates: 15°09′48″N 77°10′41″E
- Elevation: 431 metres (1,414 ft)
- System: Indian Railways station
- Owner: Indian Railways
- Operator: South Coast Railway
- Line: Guntakal–Vasco da Gama line
- Platforms: 1
- Tracks: Double Electric-Line

Construction
- Structure type: Standard (on ground)

Other information
- Status: Functioning
- Station code: TKBN
- Zone(s): South Coast Railway zone
- Division(s): Guntakal

Services
Preceding station	Indian Railways	Following station
Bevinahalu towards ?	South Coast Railway zone Guntakal–Vasco da Gama section	Virapur towards ?
Location
- Interactive map

T. Sakibanda railway station is a railway station located on the Guntakal–Vasco da Gama line operated by the South Coast Railway zone under Guntakal railway division. It is situated beside National Highway 63 in Kurnool district in the Indian state of Andhra Pradesh.
