= Bantanahal railway station =

Railway station in Andhra Pradesh

Bantanahal

General information
- Location: Bantanahal Road, Khajipuram, Kurnool district, Andhra Pradesh; India
- Coordinates: 15°09′46″N 77°16′33″E
- Elevation: 460 metres (1,510 ft)
- System: Indian Railways station
- Owner: Indian Railways
- Operator: South Coast Railway
- Line: Guntakal–Vasco da Gama line
- Platforms: 2
- Tracks: Double Electric-Line

Construction
- Structure type: Standard (on ground)

Other information
- Status: Functioning
- Station code: BLL
- Zone(s): South Coast Railway zone
- Division(s): Guntakal

Services
Preceding station	Indian Railways	Following station
Guntakal West towards ?	South Coast Railway zone Guntakal–Vasco da Gama section	Sankara-Gummanur towards ?
Location
- Interactive map

Bantanahal railway station is a railway station located on the Guntakal–Vasco da Gama line operated by the South Coast Railway zone under Guntakal railway division. It is situated beside Bantanahal Road at Khajipuram in Kurnool district in the Indian state of Andhra Pradesh.
