= Lokmanya Tilak Terminus =

Railway terminus in Mumbai, India

Lokmanya Tilak Terminus Kurla Terminus
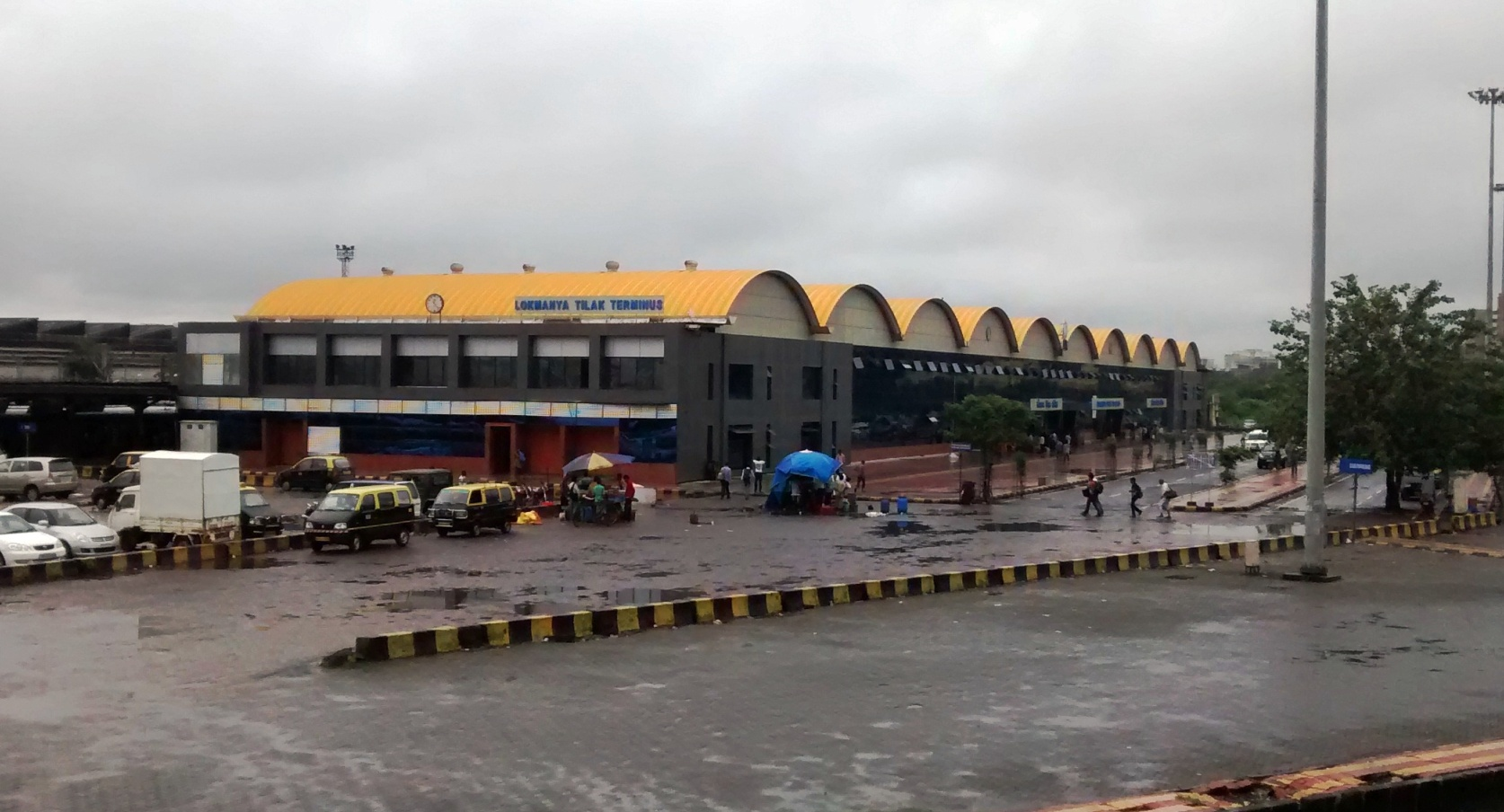
- New terminal building at LTT

General information
- Location: Pipeline Road, Kurla, Mumbai, Maharashtra; India
- Coordinates: 19.07°N 72.89°E
- Elevation: 7 metres (23 ft)
- System: Indian Railways terminus
- Owner: Indian Railways
- Operator: Central Railway zone
- Platforms: 7
- Tracks: 23
- Connections: BEST buses, taxi stand, prepaid auto service

Construction
- Structure type: Standard on-ground station
- Parking: Available

Other information
- Status: Functional
- Station code: LTT
- Zone(s): Central Railway zone
- Division(s): Mumbai CR

History
- Opened: 1991
- Electrified: 25 kV 50 Hz AC
- Former names: Kurla Terminus
Location
- Location within Mumbai Location within Maharashtra Location within India

Lokmanya Tilak Terminus (also known by its former name Kurla Terminus, station code: LTT) is a railhead and a major railway terminus in the Kurla suburb of Mumbai, India. LTT is managed by the Central Railway. The Kurla and Tilak Nagar suburban railway stations are located nearby. It is one of the five railway terminals within Mumbai, the others being Chhatrapati Shivaji Terminus, Dadar (Central) on the Central line, and Mumbai Central, Dadar (Western) and Bandra Terminus on the Western line.

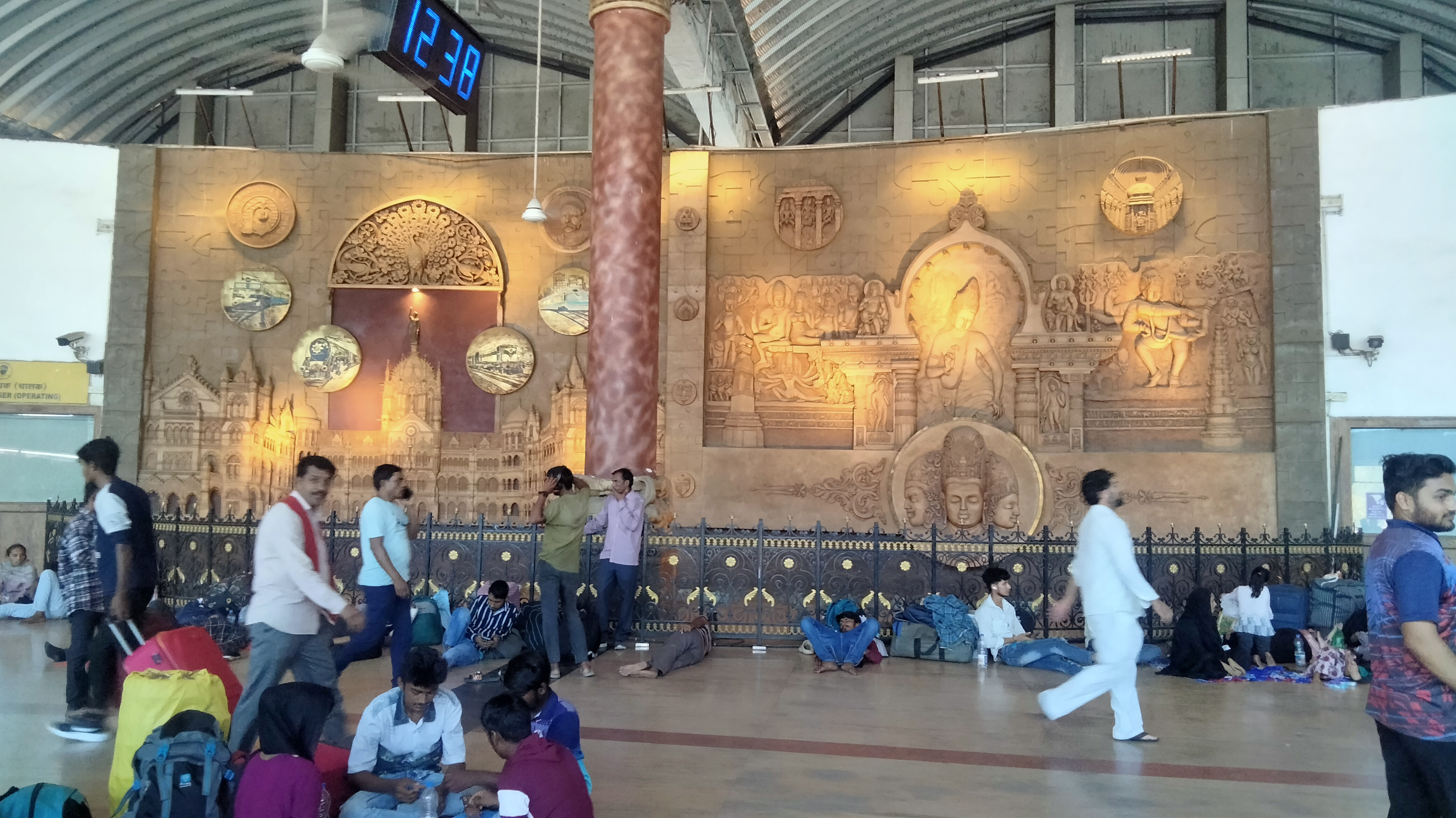
Artistic Wall at Lokmanya Tilak Terminus

== History ==
In 1996, the Brihanmumbai Municipal Corporation (BMC) approved a plan to rename the Kurla Terminus station after Lokmanya Tilak, a popular leader of the Indian independence movement, and forwarded it to the Union Government through the Government of Maharashtra.

Then Union Home Minister Lal Krishna Advani approved the proposal in 1999, at the request of Ram Naik, the then Minister of State of Railway. In the first phase, two platformfaces, with 6000sq m of platform shelter, three stabling lines, two pit lines loco shed and station building with 2300 sq. m area etc. are to be provided at an estimated cost of Rs. 24.95 crores. Major portion of work in Phase-I was planned to be completed in 1989.

In 2003, Central Railway (CR) decided to expand LTT to take on more rail traffic, as the Chhatrapati Shivaji Terminus (CSMT) had reached its saturation point, and was unable to handle any more express trains. In 2006, the Mumbai division of CR cleared the designs for the construction of a elaborate station complex to replace the dilapidated terminus complex. The new station complex design was prepared by the architect P. K. Das. The Mumbai Metropolitan Region Development Authority (MMRDA) also agreed to construct a ramp from LTT to the flyover to be built nearby, as part of the Santa Cruz–Chembur Link Road (SCLR). The revamped LTT was inaugurated on 16 April 2013 by Railway Minister Pawan Kumar Bansal. The revamp of the terminus took three years. The new station complex was built on 50,000 sq meter land and has a 3,300 sq meter concourse.

In October 2012, CR announced plans to cease long-distance train services at Dadar Terminus within 5–6 years. The load would be transferred to LTT by upgrading the number of platforms at LTT from five to 12. CR plans to introduce connectivity with other modes of transport as well as build a mall, multi-story parking, escalators, restaurants, food courts, better signage and indicators, budget hotels and an aesthetically pleasing exterior and interior. The project will be implemented in public–private partnership (PPP) mode and is expected to cost ₹ 50–60 billion. The project will be executed by the Railway Land Development Authority on the 20 acres of land that CR possesses around LTT.

== Major trains ==
The train which originates from Lokmanya Tilak Terminus (LTT) are :

● Lokmanya Tilak Terminus–Secunderabad Duronto Express (12219/12220)

● Lokmanya Tilak Terminus–Ernakulam Duronto Express (12223/12224)

● Lokmanya Tilak Terminus–Prayagraj Duronto Express (12293/12294)

● Lokmanya Tilak Terminus–Agartala AC Superfast Express (12519/12520)

● Lokmanya Tilak Terminus - Hazrat Nizamuddin AC Superfast Express (22109/22110)

● Lokmanya Tilak Terminus–Karmali AC Superfast Express (22115/22116)

● Lokmanya Tilak Terminus–Madgaon AC Superfast Express (11099/11100)

● Lokmanya Tilak Terminus–Haridwar AC Superfast Express (12171/12172)

● Lokmanya Tilak Terminus–Lucknow AC Superfast Express (22121/22122)

● Lokmanya Tilak Terminus - Dhanbad Weekly Express (13379/13380)

● Lokmanya Tilak Terminus–Coimbatore Express (11013/11014)

● Lokmanya Tilak Terminus–Kamakhya Karmabhoomi Express (22511/22512)

● Lokmanya Tilak Terminus - Visakhapatnam Superfast Express (Via Nagpur) (22847/22848)

● Lokmanya Tilak Terminus–Puri Superfast Express (Via Jharsuguda Road) (22865/22866)

● Lokmanya Tilak Terminus–Puri Superfast Express (via Titlagarh) (12145/12146)

● Lokmanya Tilak Terminus–Guwahati Express (15647/15648)

● Lokmanya Tilak Terminus–Dibrugarh Express (15945/15946)

● Lokmanya Tilak Terminus–Bhubaneswar Superfast Express (12879/12880)

● Lokmanya Tilak Terminus - Thiruvananthapuram Central Netravati Express (16345/16346)

● Lokmanya Tilak Terminus - Kakinada Port Express (17221/17222)

● Lokmanya Tilak Terminus - Shalimar Express (18029/18030)

● Lokmanya Tilak Terminus - Shalimar Jnaneswari Express (12101/12102)

● Lokmanya Tilak Terminus - Shalimar Samarsata Express (12152/12153)

● Lokmanya Tilak Terminus - Visakhapatnam Express (Via Vijayawada) (18519/18520)

● Lokmanya Tilak Terminus – MGR Chennai Central Express (12163/12164)

● Lokmanya Tilak Terminus–Madurai Express (22101/22102)

● Lokmanya Tilak Terminus - Ayodhya Cantt Superfast Express (22103/22104)

● Lokmanya Tilak Terminus–Thiruvananthapuram North Express (22113/22114)

● Lokmanya Tilak Terminus - Ayodhya Cantt Tulsi Express (22129/22130)

● Lokmanya Tilak Terminus–Chennai Central Weekly Express (22179/22180)

● Lokmanya Tilak Terminus - Ayodhya Cantt Saket Express (22183/22184)

● Lokmanya Tilak Terminus - Ranchi Weekly Express (18609/18610)

● Lokmanya Tilak Terminus–Gorakhpur Express (Via Barhni) (11079/11080)

● Lokmanya Tilak Terminus–Gorakhpur Express (Via Varanasi) (11081/11082)

● Lokmanya Tilak Terminus–Sitapur Junction Superfast Express (12107/12108)

● Lokmanya Tilak Terminus–Patliputra Express (12141/12142)

● Lokmanya Tilak Terminus–Sultanpur Express (12143/12144)

● Lokmanya Tilak Terminus–Rani Kamalapati Superfast Express (12153/12154)

● Lokmanya Tilak Terminus - Agra Lashkar Express (12161/12162)

● Lokmanya Tilak Terminus–Gorakhpur Express (Via Prayagraj) (12165/12166)

● Lokmanya Tilak Terminus–Varanasi Express (12167/12168)

● Lokmanya Tilak Terminus - Pratapgarh Udyognagri Express (12173/12174)

● Lokmanya Tilak Terminus - Thiruvananthapuram North Garib Rath Express (12201/12202)

● Lokmanya Tilak Terminus - Bhagalpur Superfast Express (12335/12336)

● Lokmanya Tilak Terminus - Raxaul Karmabhoomi Express (12545/12546)

● Lokmanya Tilak Terminus - Mangaluru Central Matsyagandha Express (12619/12620)

● Lokmanya Tilak Terminus–Karaikal Weekly Express (11017/11018)

● Lokmanya Tilak Terminus - Saharsa Amrit Bharat Express (11015/11016)

● Lokmanya Tilak Terminus–Chhapra Express (11059/11060)

● Lokmanya Tilak Terminus - Jaynagar Pawan Express (11061/11062)

● Lokmanya Tilak Terminus - Ballia Kamayani Express (11071/11072)

● Lokmanya Tilak Terminus - Gonda Junction Godaan Express (11055/11056)

● Lokmanya Tilak Terminus–Hatia Superfast Express (12811/12812)

● Lokmanya Tilak Terminus - Rajgir Janta Express (13201/13202)

● Lokmanya Tilak Terminus–Bareilly Weekly Express (14313/14314)

● Lokmanya Tilak Terminus - Gorakhpur Kashi Express (15017/15018)

● Lokmanya Tilak Terminus - Raxaul Antyodaya Express (Via Chhapra) (15267/15268)

● Lokmanya Tilak Terminus–Azamgarh Weekly Express (20103/20104)

● Lokmanya Tilak Terminus–Gaya Weekly Superfast Express (22358/22359)

● Lokmanya Tilak Terminus - Gorakhpur Kushinagar Superfast Express (22537/22538)

● Lokmanya Tilak Terminus - Raxaul Antyodaya Express (Via Patliputra) (22533/22534)

● Lokmanya Tilak Terminus - Chhapra Antyodaya Express (22583/22584)

== Accessibility ==
LTT is in the middle of two suburban railway stations, Tilak Nagar and Kurla, on the Harbour line. It is easily accessible through Tilak Nagar as a direct overhead bridge is made to LTT from Tilak Nagar. A share rickshaw service is available from Kurla to LTT via level crossing. The average opening of the level crossing gate is 20 minutes.

=== Dormitories ===
Air-conditioned dormitories were inaugurated at LTT on 16 April 2013 by then Railway Minister Pawan Kumar Bansal. The dorm at LTT is a 24-bed AC dorm exclusively for women.

=== Rainwater harvesting ===
Central Railway (CR) completed the installation of a rainwater harvesting system at LTT in October 2012. The system cost ₹1 million (US$10,000) and will conserve 700,000 litres of water, which is approximately 40% of the station's daily water requirement. The rainwater harvesting project will help in the percolation of water into the subsoil, which will reduce flooding in the vicinity during the monsoon. The project involved constructing a 2 km trench and filling it with crushed stones.

== Diesel Loco Shed, Kurla ==
Serial No.	Locomotive Class	Horsepower	Holding
1.	WDG-3A	3100	23
2.	WDM-3D	3300	20
4.	WDS-6	1400	31
Total Locomotives Active as of August 2025			74
