= Lokmanya Tilak Terminus–Thiruvananthapuram North Express =

Lokmanya Tilak Terminus–Thiruvananthapuram North Superfast Express
Overview
- Service type: Superfast
- First service: 24 January 2014; 12 years ago
- Current operator: Central Railway zone

Route
- Termini: Lokmanya Tilak Terminus; Thiruvananthapuram North
- Stops: 24
- Distance travelled: 1,777 km (1,104 mi)
- Average journey time: 28 hours
- Service frequency: Bi-Weekly
- Train number: 22113 / 22114

On-board services
- Classes: AC 1st class, AC 2 tier, AC 3 tier, sleeper class, general unreserved
- Seating arrangements: Yes
- Sleeping arrangements: Yes
- Catering facilities: No

Technical
- Rolling stock: LHB coach
- Track gauge: 1,676 mm (5 ft 6 in)
- Operating speed: 57.5 km/h (36 mph)

The 22113 / 14 Lokmanya Tilak Terminus–Thiruvananthapuram North Superfast Express is a Superfast Express train belonging to Indian Railways' Central Railway Zone that runs between Lokmanya Tilak Terminus and Thiruvananthapuram North in India.

It operates as train number 22113 from Lokmanya Tilak Terminus to Thiruvananthapuram North and as train number 22114 in the reverse direction, serving the states of Maharashtra, Goa, Karnataka & Kerala.

== Coaches ==
The 22113 / 14 Lokmanya Tilak Terminus–Thiruvananthapuram North Superfast Express has 1 AC First class, 1 AC 2-tier, 5 AC 3-tier, 9 sleeper class, 4 general unreserved and two EOG coaches. It does not carry a pantry car.

As is customary with most train services in India, coach composition may be amended at the discretion of Indian Railways depending on demand. The train has LHB coach.

== Service ==
The 22113 Lokmanya Tilak Terminus–Kochuveli Express covers the distance of 1,777 km (1,104 mi) in 30 hours 05 mins (50 km/h) and in 31 hours 25 mins as the 22114 Kochuveli–Lokmanya Tilak Terminus Express (48 km/h).

As the average speed of the train is above 55 km/h (34 mph), as per railway rules, its fare includes a Superfast surcharge.

== Routing ==
The 22113 / 14 Lokmanya Tilak Terminus–Thiruvananthapuram North Superfast Express runs from Lokmanya Tilak Terminus via Panvel, Ratnagiri, Madgaon Junction, Mangalore Junction, Kasaragod, Kannur, Kozhikode, Shoranur Junction, Thrissur, Ernakulam Town, Kottayam, Tiruvalla to Thiruvananthapuram North.

== Traction ==
It is hauled by a Kalyan based WAP-7 Vadodara based WAP-5 electric locomotive from end to end.
