= Virapur railway station =

Railway station in Karnataka

Virapur

General information
- Location: Karekal Veerapura, Ballari district, Karnatak; India
- Coordinates: 15°09′32″N 77°07′54″E
- Elevation: 426 metres (1,398 ft)
- System: Indian Railways station
- Owner: Indian Railways
- Operator: South Coast Railway
- Line: Guntakal–Vasco da Gama line
- Platforms: 3
- Tracks: Double Electric-Line

Construction
- Structure type: Standard (on ground)

Other information
- Status: Functioning
- Station code: VP
- Zone(s): South Coast Railway zone
- Division(s): Guntakal

Services
| Preceding station | Indian Railways | Following station |
|---|---|---|
| T. Sakibanda towards ? | South Coast Railway zone Guntakal–Vasco da Gama section | Hagari towards ? |
Location
- Interactive map

Virapur railway station is a railway station located on the Guntakal–Vasco da Gama line operated by the South Coast Railway zone under Guntakal railway division. It is situated at Karekal Veerapura in Ballari district in the Indian state of Karnatak.
