= Bhadohi railway station =

Railway station in Uttar Pradesh, India

Bhadohi भदोही

General information
- Location: Station Road, Bhadohi, Uttar Pradesh, India; India
- Coordinates: 25°23′43″N 82°33′30″E
- Line: Varanasi–Rae Bareli–Lucknow line
- Platforms: 2
- Tracks: 3

Construction
- Structure type: Standard (on-ground station)
- Parking: Yes

Other information
- Status: Functioning
- Station code: BOY
- Fare zone: Northern Railway zone
Location

Bhadohi railway station (station code: BOY) is a railway station serving the town of Bhadohi in the Bhadohi district, Uttar Pradesh, India. It falls under the Lucknow NR division of the Northern Railway Zone of Indian Railways.

== Overview ==
The station serves the town of Bhadohi, widely recognized as "Carpet City" due to its hand-knotted carpet weaving industry. It connects the local area to key commercial hubs and major regional centers including Varanasi, Lucknow, Prayagraj, and Delhi, Mumbai,Howrah

== Lines ==
The station lies on the Varanasi–Rae Bareli–Lucknow line and Varanasi–Bhadohi–Prayagraj line facilitating both passenger and freight transportation through eastern Uttar Pradesh.

== Facilities ==
Bhadohi railway station consists of two platforms and basic passenger amenities, including:

- Ticket booking counters
- Passenger waiting halls
- Refreshment stalls and sanitised washrooms
- Parking areas for two-wheelers and local passenger transport connections (auto-rickshaws, buses)

== Major Train Stoppages ==
Bhadohi railway station connects the town to major cities across India through several Express, Superfast, and local Passenger/MEMU trains.

Train No.	Train Name	Route / Destination
15127 / 15128	Kashi Vishwanath Express	Banaras – New Delhi
13005 / 13006	Amritsar Mail	Howrah Junction – Amritsar Junction
15119 / 15120	Janta Express	Banaras – Dehradun
14203 / 14204	Varanasi–Lucknow Intercity Express	Varanasi Junction – Lucknow Charbagh
22541 / 22542	Anand Vihar Terminal–Banaras Garib Rath Express	Banaras – Anand Vihar Terminal
11071 / 11072	Kamayani Express	Ballia / Varanasi – Lokmanya Tilak Terminus
11107 / 11108	Bundelkhand Express	Gwalior Junction – Banaras
15017 / 15018	Kashi Express	Lokmanya Tilak Terminus – Gorakhpur Junction
54291 / 54292	Varanasi–Pratapgarh Passenger	Varanasi Junction – MBDP Pratapgarh Junction
65117 / 65118	Ghazipur City–Prayagraj Sangam MEMU	Ghazipur City – Prayagraj Sangam

Note: Train schedules, numbers, and operational routes are subject to periodic updates by Indian Railways.

== Demands for New Stoppages and Infrastructure Upgrades ==
Owing to Bhadohi's prominence as a global carpet manufacturing and export hub, local passenger associations and the Member of Parliament representing the Bhadohi Lok Sabha constituency have repeatedly raised issues regarding the lack of direct connectivity to major metropolitan cities.

Due to the absence of commercial halts for several major trains, passengers and exporters from Bhadohi are currently forced to travel to nearby major junctions such as Varanasi Junction or Janghai to board long-distance trains. A formal charter of demands submitted to the Ministry of Railways requested commercial stoppages for the following key services:

=== Key Demanded Train Halts ===
- New Delhi Rajdhani Express
- Poorva Express
- New Delhi Express
- Anand Vihar Terminal Weekly Express
- Anand Vihar Terminal Jansadharna Express
- Kolkata Weekly Express
- Gandhinagar Capital Weekly Superfast Express
- Varanasi–Delhi Festival Special Express
- Shri Mata Vaishno Devi Katra (SMVD Katra) Special Train
- Varanasi–Chandigarh Special Express

=== Infrastructure & Station Development Demands ===
Along with train stoppages, requests were formally submitted for:

- Construction of Railway Overbridges (ROBs) at busy level crossings around Bhadohi town to ease traffic congestion.
- Infrastructure expansion at Bhadohi railway station, including longer platform shelters, improved foot overbridges (FOBs), enhanced passenger waiting halls, and upgraded electronic train status displays.
