= Lokmanya Tilak Terminus–Chennai Central Weekly Express =

Lokmanya Tilak Terminus – Puratchi Thalaivar Dr. M.G. Ramachandran Central Railway Station Weekly Superfast Express
Overview
- Service type: Superfast
- First service: 15 December 2014; 11 years ago
- Current operator: Central Railway

Route
- Termini: Lokmanya Tilak Terminus (LTT); Puratchi Thalaivar Dr. M.G. Ramachandran Central railway station (MAS)
- Stops: 15
- Distance travelled: 1,269 km (789 mi)
- Average journey time: 21 hours 40 minutes as LTT–Chennai Express, 22 hours 35 minutes as Chennai–LTT Express
- Service frequency: Weekly (Note: Runs one days in a week for every direction.)
- Train number: 22179/22180

On-board services
- Classes: AC 2 Tier, AC 3 Tier, Sleeper Class, Unreserved General
- Seating arrangements: Yes
- Sleeping arrangements: Yes
- Catering facilities: Yes
- Entertainment facilities: No

Technical
- Rolling stock: 2
- Track gauge: 1,676 mm (5 ft 6 in)
- Operating speed: 58 km/h (36 mph)
Route map
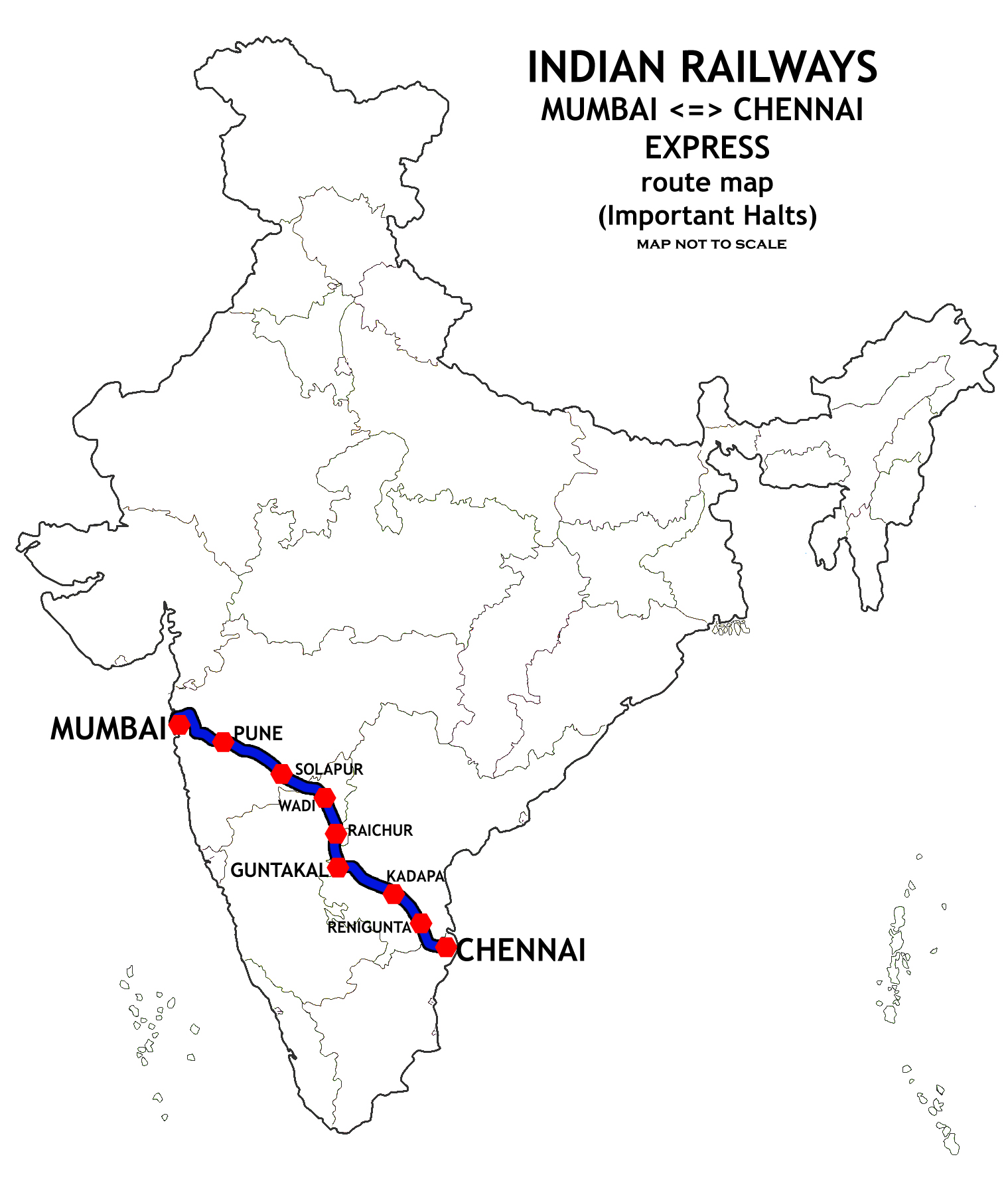

Lokmanya Tilak Terminus – Puratchi Thalaivar Dr. M.G. Ramachandran Central Railway Station Weekly Superfast Express is an express train of the Indian Railways connecting Lokmanya Tilak Terminus, Mumbai in Maharashtra and Puratchi Thalaivar Dr. M.G. Ramachandran Central railway station, Chennai of Tamil Nadu. It is currently being operated with 22179/22180 train numbers on a weekly basis.

== Service ==
The 22179/Lokmanya Tilak Terminus – Puratchi Thalaivar Dr. M.G. Ramachandran Central Railway Station Weekly Superfast Express has an average speed of 58 km/h and covers 1262 km in 21 hrs 40 mins. 22180/Puratchi Thalaivar Dr. M.G. Ramachandran Central Railway Station – Lokmanya Tilak Terminus Weekly Superfast Express has an average speed of 56 km/h and 1262 km in 22 hrs 35 mins.

== Route and halts ==
The important halts of the train are:

- Lokmanya Tilak Terminus
- Kalyan Junction
- Pune Junction
- Solapur
- Gulbarga
- Wadi Junction
- Yadgir
- Raichur Junction
- Manthralayam Road
- Guntakal Junction
- Gooty Junction
- Yerraguntla Junction
- Cuddapah
- Renigunta Junction
- Arakkonam Junction
- Perambur
- Puratchi Thalaivar Dr. M.G. Ramachandran Central railway station

== Coaches ==
As is customary with most train services in India, coach composition may be amended at the discretion of Indian Railways depending on demand.

== Coach composition (Downward – 22179) ==
The train consists of:

- 1 AC Two-tier coach (A1)
- 6 AC Three-tier coaches (B1, B2, B3, B4, B5, B6)
- 8 Sleeper coaches (S1 – S8)
- 1 Pantry Car
- 4 Unreserved General Sitting Coaches (GS)
- 2 Generator Cars

Loco	1	2	3	4	5	6	7	8	9	10	11	12	13	14	15	16	17	18	19	20	21	22
	EOG	GS	GS	B1	B2	B3	B4	B5	B6	A1	PC	S1	S2	S3	S4	S5	S6	S7	S8	GS	GS	SLR

== Traction ==
Both trains are hauled by an Erode/Royapuram based WAG-9 and WAP-7 electric locomotive from end to end
