= Guntakal West railway station =

Railway station in Andhra Pradesh

Guntakal West

General information
- Location: Guntakal, Anantapur district, Andhra Pradesh; India
- Coordinates: 15°10′03″N 77°20′34″E
- Elevation: 449 metres (1,473 ft)
- System: Indian Railways station
- Owner: Indian Railways
- Operator: South Coast Railway
- Line: Guntakal–Vasco da Gama line
- Platforms: 1
- Tracks: Double Electric-Line

Construction
- Structure type: Standard (on ground)

Other information
- Status: Functioning
- Station code: GTLW
- Zone(s): South Coast Railway zone
- Division(s): Guntakal

Services
Preceding station	Indian Railways	Following station
Guntakal Junction towards ?	South Coast Railway zone Guntakal–Vasco da Gama section	Bantanahal towards ?
Location
- Interactive map

Guntakal West railway station is a railway station located on the Guntakal–Vasco da Gama line operated by the South Coast Railway zone under Guntakal railway division. It is situated at Guntakal in Anantapur district in the Indian state of Andhra Pradesh.
