= Hagari railway station =

Railway station in Karnataka

Hagari

General information
- Location: National Highway 63, Hagari, Ballari district, Karnatak; India
- Coordinates: 15°09′04″N 77°03′06″E
- Elevation: 420 metres (1,380 ft)
- System: Indian Railways station
- Owner: Indian Railways
- Operator: South Coast Railway
- Line: Guntakal–Vasco da Gama line
- Platforms: 2
- Tracks: Double Electric-Line

Construction
- Structure type: Standard (on ground)

Other information
- Status: Functioning
- Station code: HGI
- Zone(s): South Coast Railway zone
- Division(s): Guntakal

Services
Preceding station	Indian Railways	Following station
Virapur towards ?	South Coast Railway zone Guntakal–Vasco da Gama section	Haddinagundu towards ?
Location
- Interactive map

Hagari railway station is a railway station located on the Guntakal–Vasco da Gama line operated by the South Coast Railway zone under Guntakal railway division. It is situated beside National Highway 63 at Hagari in Ballari district in the Indian state of Karnatak.
