= Lokmanya Tilak Terminus–Puri Superfast Express (via Titlagarh) =

Superfast train in India

Lokmnanya Tilak Terminus Puri Express (via Titlagarh)
Overview
- Service type: Superfast
- Current operator: Central Railways

Route
- Termini: Lokmanya Tilak Terminus; Puri
- Stops: 25
- Distance travelled: 1,878 km (1,167 mi)
- Average journey time: 35 hours
- Service frequency: Weekly
- Train number: 12145 / 12146

On-board services
- Classes: AC 1st Class, AC 2 tier, AC 3 tier, Sleeper, General
- Sleeping arrangements: Yes
- Catering facilities: Pantry Car Coach attached

Technical
- Rolling stock: LHB coach
- Track gauge: 1,676 mm (5 ft 6 in)
- Operating speed: 140 km/h (87 mph) maximum,54 km/h (34 mph), including halts

Lokmnanya Tilak Terminus–Puri Express is a Weekly Superfast Express Train belongs to Indian Railways that runs between the Lokmanya Tilak Terminus (Mumbai) and Puri in India. The number of this train is given as 12145 and 12146 in both directions.

Till 11 May 2019 it was run with ICF coach after 12 May 2019 its runs with LHB coach.

== Service ==
This train covers the distance of 1878 km with an average speed of 54 km/h on both sides with total time of 35 hours.

As the average speed of the train is nearly 55 km/h, as per Indian Railways rules, its fare includes a Superfast surcharge.

== Routes ==
This train passes through Kalyan Junction, Bhusaval Junction, Nagpur Junction, Raipur Junction and Titlagarh on both sides. It reverses direction at twice during its run at Titlagarh Junction and Talcher.

== Traction ==
As this route is fully electrified the WAP-7 pulls the train to the destination in both directions.
