= Lokmanya Tilak Terminus–Rani Kamalapati Superfast Express =

The Rani Kamalapati (Habibganj)–Lokmanya Tilak Superfast Express, commonly referred as "Bhopal–Mumbai Express", is a weekly superfast express train which runs between Rani Kamalapati railway station (Habibganj) of Bhopal, the capital of Madhya Pradesh and Mumbai Lokmanya Tilak Terminus railway station of Mumbai, the capital of Maharashtra.

== Arrival and departure ==
It runs as train number 12154 from Rani Kamalapati to Mumbai LTT on Friday. It leaves at 18.00 hrs and reaches at 7.30 hrs.

On reverse journey as train number 12153 from Mumbai LTT to Rani Kamalapati on Thursday leaving at 16.25 hrs and reaching at 05.50 hrs next day.

== Coach composition ==
The train is operated by Central railway. It rake is shared between train numbers 12173/12174 /12153/12154 /12161/12162 /12107/12108.It runs with LHB coaches

| Loco | 1 | 2 | 3 | 4 | 5 | 6 | 7 | 8 | 9 | 10 | 11 | 12 | 13 | 14 | 15 | 16 | 17 | 18 | 19 | 20 | 21 | 22 |
|---|---|---|---|---|---|---|---|---|---|---|---|---|---|---|---|---|---|---|---|---|---|---|
| | SLR | GEN | S1 | S2 | S3 | S4 | S5 | S6 | S7 | S8 | S9 | S10 | S11 | S12 | PC | B1 | B2 | B3 | B4 | A1 | GEN | EOG |

Catering service is provided by attached pantry car.

== Locomotion ==
After 12 February 2014, this train is hauled end to end by a Kalyan-based WAP-7 or a Ajni-based WAP-7 as Central Railways has completed its DC-AC conversion on 12 February 2014 between Kalyan and LTT.
