= Lashkar Express =

Train in India

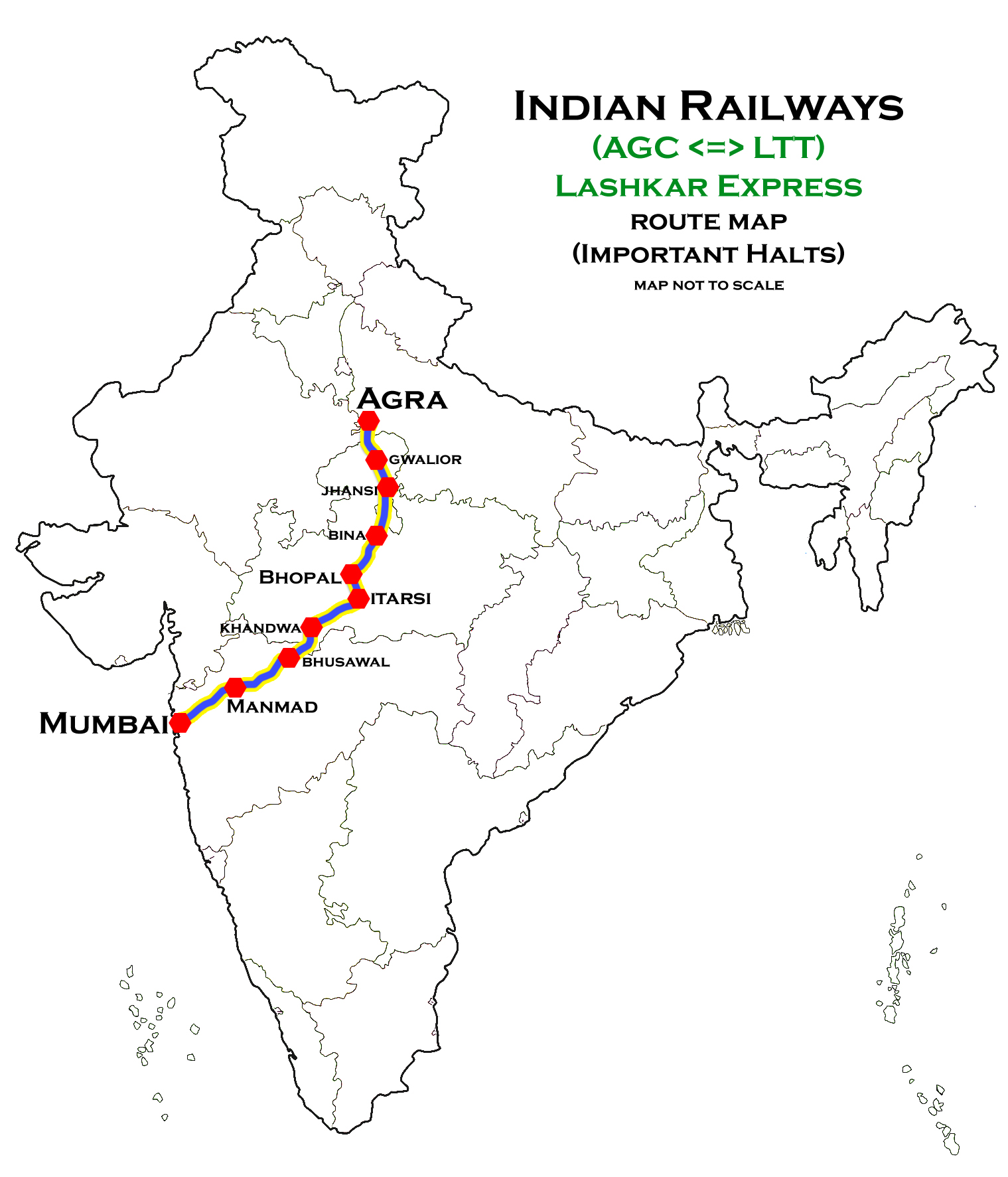
Lashkar Express (Mumbai – Agra) Route map

The Lashkar Express runs between Lokmanya Tilak Terminus in Mumbai, Maharashtra and Agra Cantt. in Agra, Uttar Pradesh.
