= Visakhapatnam–Lokmanya Tilak Terminus Superfast Express =

Visakhapatnam – Mumbai LTT Superfast Express
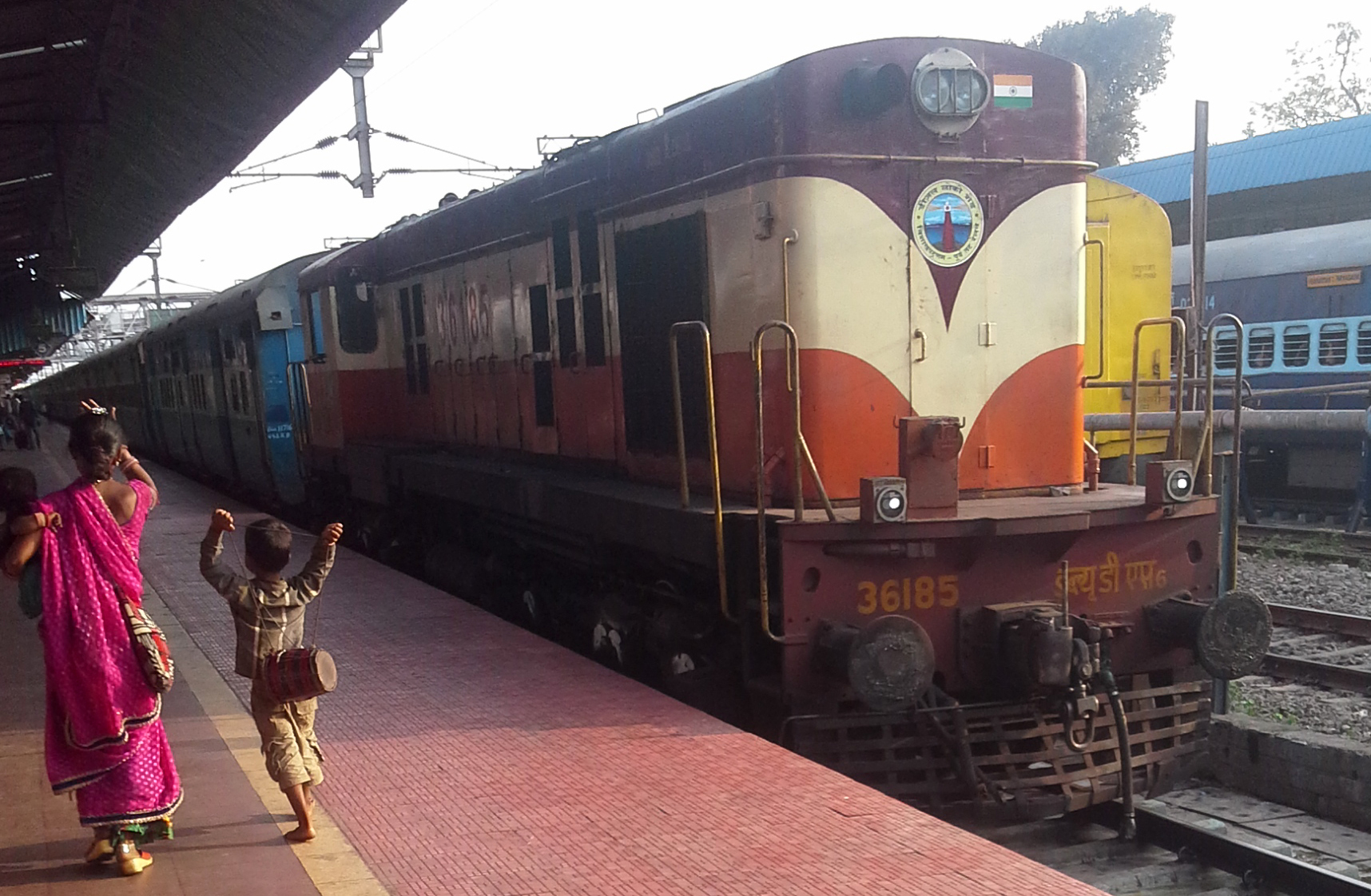

Overview
- Service type: Super Fast
- First service: July 15, 2012; 13 years ago
- Current operator: East Coast Railway zone

Route
- Termini: Visakhapatnam; Mumbai
- Stops: 21
- Distance travelled: 1,650 km (1,025 mi)
- Average journey time: 29 hours 5 minutes (average)
- Service frequency: Weekly
- Train number: 22847 / 22848

On-board services
- Classes: AC 2 tier, AC 3 tier, Sleeper Class, General Unreserved
- Seating arrangements: Yes
- Sleeping arrangements: Yes
- Catering facilities: Available, No Pantry Car
- Observation facilities: Standard Indian Railways coaches

Technical
- Track gauge: 1,676 mm (5 ft 6 in)
- Operating speed: 110 km/h (68 mph) maximum 56 km/h (35 mph), including halts
Route map
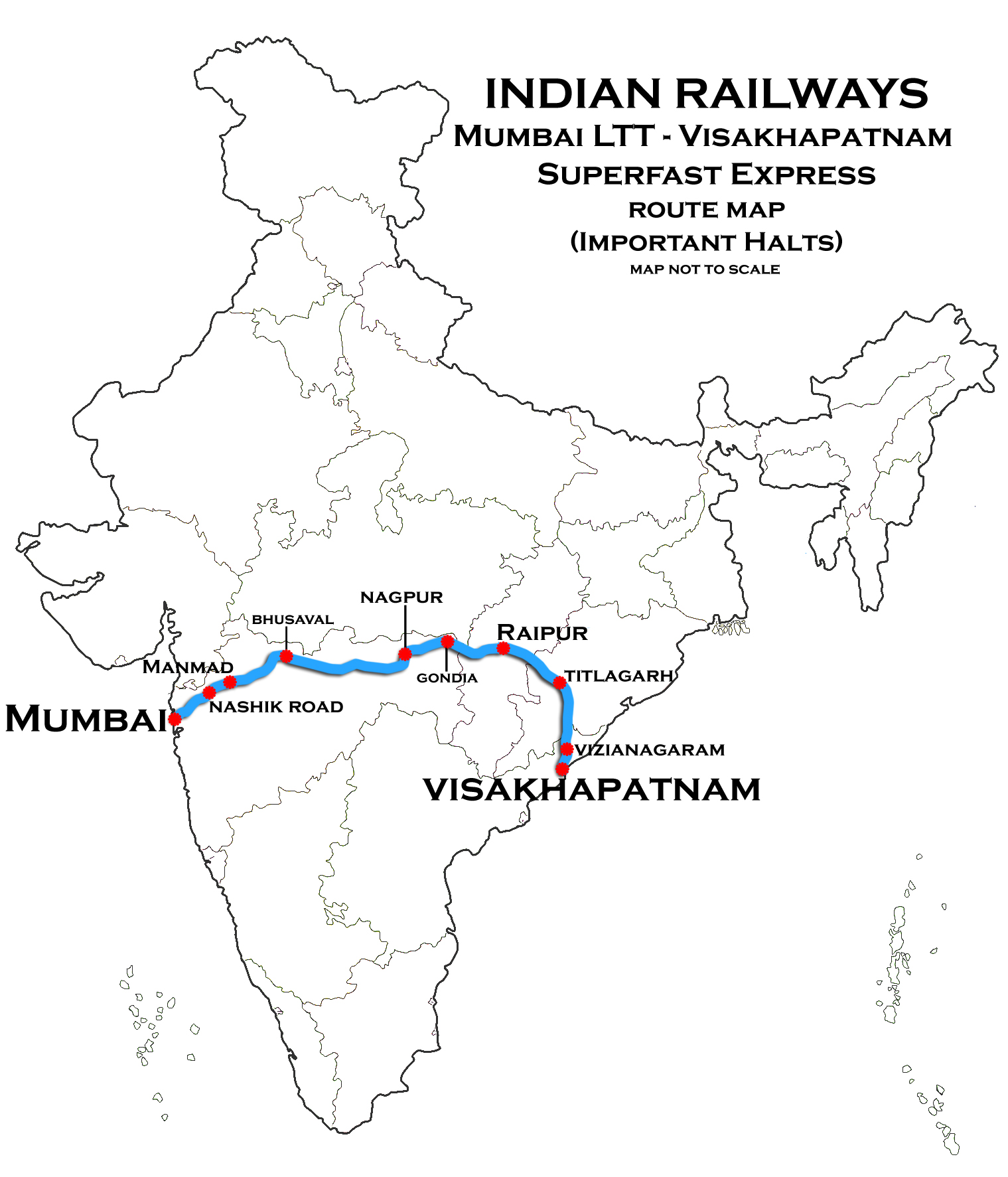

Visakhapatnam – Lokmanya Tilak Terminus Superfast Express is a weekly superfast train service of the Indian Railways running between Visakhapatnam railway station and Mumbai's Lokmanya Tilak Terminus. It was inaugurated on 15 July 2012 as announced in the 2010 rail budget.

== Coaches ==
It has 1 AC 2 tier, 1 AC 3 tier, 8 Sleeper class and 6 General unreserved coaches. As with most train services in India, Coach Composition may be changed at the departure of train depending upon demand.

Loco	1	2	3	4	5	6	7	8	9	10	11	12	13	14	15	16	17	18
	SLR	UR	UR	UR	B1	A1	S1	S2	S3	S4	S5	S6	S7	S8	UR	UR	UR	SLR

== Service ==
Visakhapatnam - Mumbai LTT Superfast Express covers the distance of 1650 km in 29 hours 5 mins as 22847 Express averaging 56 km/h.

== Locomotive ==
Initially, before 12 February 2014, it was hauled by WDM 3A locomotive of Visakhapatnam or Erode shed from Vishakhapatnam to Raipur, From Raipur to Igatpuri by WAP4 locomotive of Bhusawal shed, From Igatpuri to Mumbai LTTby WCAM 2P/3 of Kalyan shed.

As Central Railways progressively complete DC-AC conversion on 12 February 2014, this train is now hauled by a Bhusaval-based WAP-4 from Lokmanya Tilak Terminus to Raipur after which a Visakhapatnam-based WDM-3A hauls the train for the remainder of its journey until Visakhapatnam.
