= Kashi Express =

Train in India

Overview
- Service type: Express
- Locale: Maharashtra, Madhya Pradesh & Uttar Pradesh
- First service: 1 February 1907; 119 years ago
- Current operator: North Eastern Railway

Route
- Termini: Gorakhpur (GKP); Mumbai LTT (LTT)
- Stops: 66
- Distance travelled: 1,707 km (1,061 mi)
- Average journey time: 36 hours 15 minutes
- Service frequency: Daily
- Train number: 15017 / 15018

On-board services
- Classes: AC 2 Tier, AC 3 Tier, Sleeper Class, General Unreserved
- Seating arrangements: Yes
- Sleeping arrangements: Yes
- Catering facilities: Available
- Observation facilities: Large windows
- Baggage facilities: Available
- Other facilities: Below the seats

Technical
- Rolling stock: LHB coach
- Track gauge: 5 ft 6 in (1,676 mm) Broad Gauge
- Operating speed: 47 km/h (29 mph) average including halts.

The 15017 / 15018 Kashi Express is a express train of Indian Railways, running between Lokmanya Tilak Terminus, Mumbai, the capital city of Maharashtra, and Gorakhpur Junction, the prominent city of Uttar Pradesh.

In January 2026, the train received a bomb hoax at Mau station in Uttar Pradesh.

== Coach composition ==
The train generally consists of a total of 22 coaches as follows:

- 1 AC II tier
- 9 AC III tier
- 4 sleeper class
- 6 unreserved
- 2 unreserved cum luggage/brake van
- Loco reversal: Allahabad Junction

== Locomotion ==
As Central Railways completed its DC–AC conversion on 12 February 2014, a Bhusawal or Itarsi or Lalaguda-based WAP-4 hauls the train from Lokmanya Tilak Terminus to Itarsi after which an Itarsi-based WDM-3A/3D hauls the train for the remainder of its journey until Gorakhpur.

Before 12 February 2014, this train was hauled by a Kalyan-based WCAM-3 locomotive between LTT and Igatpuri as the route was DC electrified.

== Schedule [data missing] ==
| Train number | Station code | Departure station | Departure time (IST) | Arrival station | Arrival time | Arrival day |
|---|---|---|---|---|---|---|
| 15017 | LTT | Lokmanya Tilak Terminus | 6:35 AM | Gorakhpur | 7:10 PM | Next day |
| 15018 | GKP | Gorakhpur | 5:30 AM | Lokmanya Tilak Terminus | 6:05 PM | Next day |
