= Sitapur Junction railway station =

Railway station in Uttar Pradesh, India

Sitapur Junction
- Indian Railways logo

General information
- Location: National Highway 24, Sitapur, Uttar Pradesh; India
- Coordinates: 27.5575°N 80.6993°E
- Elevation: 142 metres (466 ft)
- System: Indian Railways station
- Owner: Indian Railways
- Operator: North Eastern Railway
- Lines: Aishbagh-Bareilly Section (Via Sitapur, Pilibhit); Roza-Burhwal Loop Line
- Platforms: 6
- Tracks: 8
- Connections: Auto stand

Construction
- Structure type: Standard (on-ground station)
- Parking: Yes
- Cycle facilities: No

Other information
- Status: Functioning
- Station code: STP
- Zone(s): North Eastern Railway
- Division(s): Lucknow NER

History
- Opened: Yes
- Closed: No
- Rebuilt: Yes
Location
- Location within India Location within Uttar Pradesh

Sitapur Junction is a railway junction in the North Eastern Railway zone in Sitapur district, Uttar Pradesh. This junction lies on Aishbagh-Bareilly Section (Vaya Sitapur, Pilibhit) and Roza-Burhwal Line. Its code is STP. It serves Sitapur city. The main line of the Lucknow–Basti–Gorakhpur section is 277 km (172 mi), and also features a branch line which connects to Roza Jn. (Shahjahanpur) from Burhwal Junction with a length of 188 km (117 mi), and joins to the Lucknow–Moradabad line. The upgraded station now consists of five platforms. Three platforms have been completely renovated to have basic facilities including water and sanitation.
