= Tulsi Express =

Train in India

The 22129 / 22130 Tulsi Express is an Express train belonging to Indian Railways – Central Railway zone that runs between Lokmanya Tilak Terminus and Ayodhya Cantt in India. It is the only train that runs from Mumbai to Ayodhya Cantt via Virangana Lakshmibai Jhansi railway station

It operates as train number 22129 from Lokmanya Tilak Terminus to Ayodhya Cantt and as train number 22130 in the reverse direction, serving the states of Maharashtra, Madhya Pradesh and Uttar Pradesh.

== Coaches ==
The 22129 / 30 Lokmanya Tilak Terminus–Ayodhya Cantt Tulsi Express has 1 AC 2 tier, 7 AC 3 tier, 9 Sleeper Class, 3 General Unreserved and 1 SLR (Seating cum Luggage Rake) coaches. It does not carry a pantry car.

As is customary with most train services in India, coach composition may be amended at the discretion of Indian Railways depending on demand.

== Service ==
The 22129 Lokmanya Tilak Terminus–Ayodhya Cantt Tulsi Express covers the distance of 1663 KM in 30 hours 0 minutes (55.43 kmph) and in 30 hours as 22130 Ayodhya Cantt–Lokmanya Tilak Terminus Tulsi Express (55.43kmph).

== Routeing ==
The 22129 / 22130 Lokmanya Tilak Terminus–Ayodhya Cantt Tulsi Express runs from Lokmanya Tilak Terminus via Thane, Kalyan Junction, karasa junction Igatpuri, Manmad Junction, Bhusaval Junction, Khandwa, Itarsi Junction, Rani Kamalapati, Bhopal Junction,Bina Junction,VGL Jhansi Junction, mahoba junction Banda Junction, Prayagraj Junction, prayag junction Sultanpur Junction and Ayodhya Cantt Junction.

It reverses direction of travel at Jhansi Junction.

== Traction ==
The route is now fully electrified. Earlier a Kalyan-based WCAM-3 locomotive would haul the train from Lokmanya Tilak Terminus until Manmad Junction handing over to an Itarsi-based WAP-4 or WAM-4 until Jhansi Junction following which a Jhansi-based WDM-3A locomotive would haul the train for the remainder of the journey until Ayodhya Cantt Junction.

With Indian Railways progressively moving towards a complete changeover from DC to AC traction, it is now hauled by a Kalyan-based WAP-7 locomotive from Lokmanya Tilak Terminus to Jhansi Junction and thereafter Jhansi-based WAP-4 locomotive for the remainder of the journey until Ayodhya Cantt.

== Operation ==
22129 Lokmanya Tilak Terminus–Ayodhya Cantt Tulsi Express leaves Lokmanya Tilak Terminus every Tuesday and Sunday reaching Ayodhya Cantt Junction the next day.

22130 Ayodhya Cantt–Lokmanya Tilak Terminus Tulsi Express leaves Ayodhya Cantt Junction every Monday and Wednesday reaching Lokmanya Tilak Terminus the next day.

== Incidents ==
On 3 October 2007, a fire damaged the sleeper class coach of the train during shunting operations. As the train was empty at the time, no injuries were reported

== See also ==
- Allahabad Duronto Express
- Saket Express
- Godaan Express
- Chhapra Express
- Bhopal–Pratapgarh Express (via Lucknow)
