= Lokmanya Tilak Terminus–Sultanpur Express =

Lokmanya Tilak Terminus – Sultanpur Superfast Express
Overview
- Service type: Superfast Express
- First service: 26 January 2011; 14 years ago
- Current operator: Central Railway zone

Route
- Termini: Lokmanya Tilak Terminus (LTT); Sultanpur Junction (SLN)
- Stops: 12
- Distance travelled: 1,547 km (961 mi)
- Average journey time: 27 hours 15 minutes
- Service frequency: Weekly (Note: Runs one days in a week for every direction.)
- Train number: 12143/12144

On-board services
- Classes: AC 2 tier, AC 3 tier, Sleeper Class, General Unreserved
- Seating arrangements: No
- Sleeping arrangements: Yes
- Catering facilities: No
- Entertainment facilities: No
- Baggage facilities: Below the seats

Technical
- Rolling stock: 2
- Track gauge: 1,676 mm (5 ft 6 in)
- Operating speed: 57 km/h (35 mph)

Lokmanya Tilak Terminus – Sultanpur Superfast Express is a Weekly Superfast express train of the Indian Railways connecting Lokmanya Tilak Terminus Mumbai in Maharashtra and Sultanpur Junction of Uttar Pradesh. It is currently being operated with 12143/12144 train numbers on Weekly basis.

== Service ==
12143 departs Lokmanya Tilak Terminus at 03:45 PM on Sundays and reaches Sultanpur Junction at 05:30 PM on Mondays.

12144 departs Sultanpur Junction at 04:05 AM on Tuesdays and reaches Lokmanya Tilak Terminus at 07:25 AM on Wednesdays.

== Route and halts ==
The halts of this train service are:

- Lokmanya Tilak Terminus
- Kasara (Technical Halt for Banker Attachment)
- Igatpuri (Technical Halt for Banker Detachment)
- Nasik Road
- Manmad Junction
- Bhusaval Junction
- Khandwa Junction
- Bhopal Junction
- Bina Junction
- Jhansi Junction
- Orai
- Kanpur Central
- Lucknow Charbagh
- Nihalgarh
- Musafir Khana
- Sultanpur Junction

== Coach composite ==
The train has LHB rakes with max speed of 110 kmph. The train consists of 22 coaches :

- 1 AC II Tier
- 7 AC III Tier
- 9 Sleeper Coaches
- 3 General Second Class
- 2 Generator Luggage and Brake Van

The service is operated using a single rake, in a rake sharing arrangement (RSA) with 11081 / 11082 Lokmanya Tilak Terminus - Gorakhpur Express. The rake is maintained at Lokmanya Tilak Terminus coaching depot.

== Traction ==
Both 12143 and 12144 are hauled by a Kalyan based WAP-7 electric locomotive from LTT to Sultanpur and vice versa.
