= Guntakal Junction railway station =

Railway station in Andhra Pradesh India

Guntakal Junction
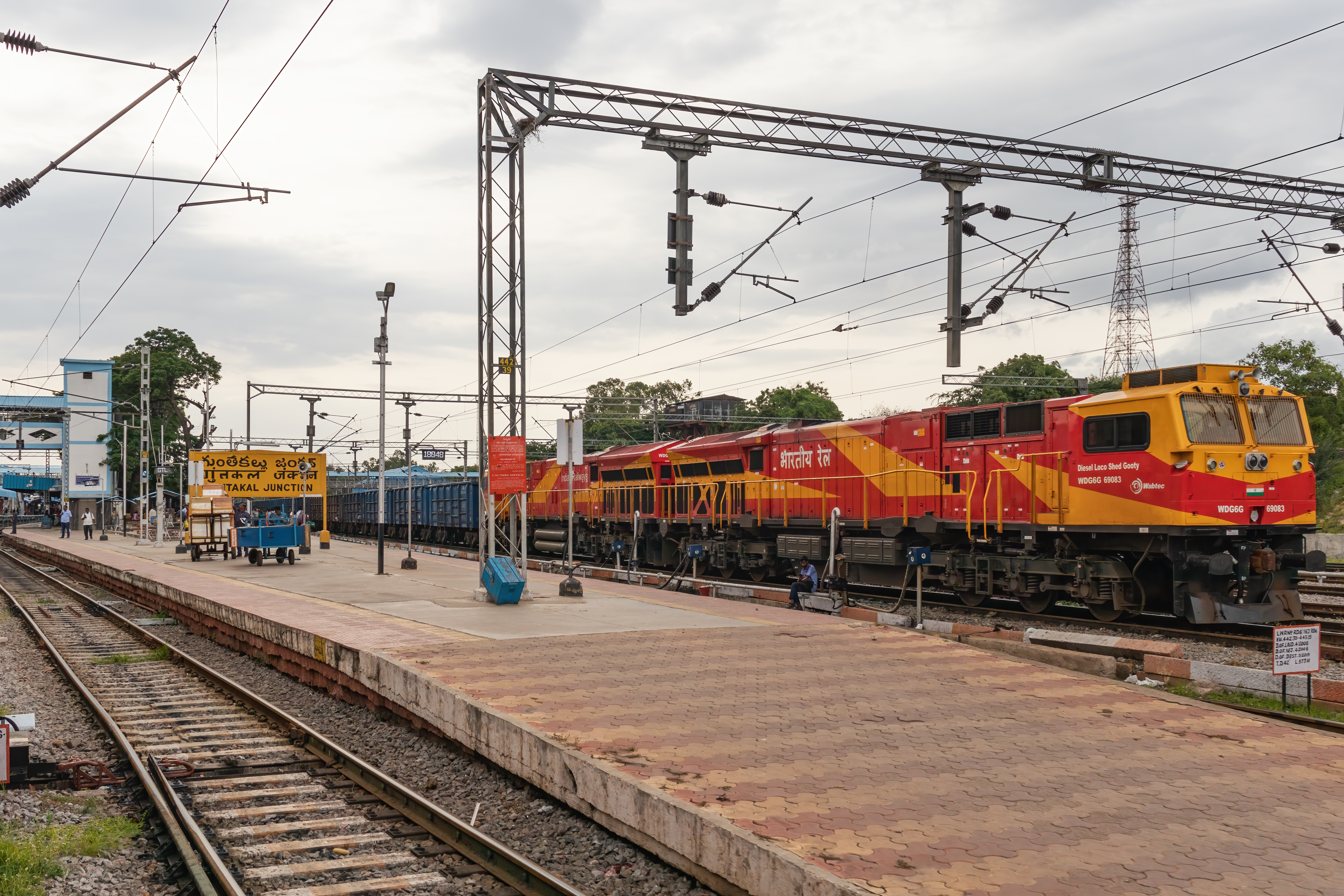
- Guntakal Junction railway station

General information
- Location: Guntakal, Andhra Pradesh; India
- Coordinates: 15°10′30″N 77°22′01″E
- Elevation: 453 metres (1,486 ft)
- System: Express train and Passenger train station
- Owner: Indian Railways
- Operator: South Coast Railway
- Lines: Guntakal–Chennai line Solapur–Guntakal section Guntakal–Bengaluru section Guntakal–Vasco da Gama section Guntakal–Vijayawada section Guntakal–Renigunta section
- Platforms: 7

Construction
- Structure type: Standard on ground
- Parking: Yes
- Cycle facilities: No

Other information
- Status: Functioning
- Station code: GTL
- Division(s): Guntakal

History
- Opened: 1872; 154 years ago
Location
- Location within India Location within Andhra Pradesh

Guntakal Junction railway station (station code: GTL) is located in Anantapur district in the Indian state of Andhra Pradesh and serves Guntakal. It is also the headquarters of Guntakal railway division in South Coast Railway (SCoR). It is a junction station at the intersection point of the Mumbai–Chennai line, the Vijayawada–Marmagova line and the Guntakal–Bengaluru line.

== History ==
During the period 1861–1871 Madras Railway extended its Chennai–Arakkonnam line to Raichuru to join the Great Indian Peninsula Railway line, thereby linking Mumbai and Chennai with a 5 ft 6 in (1,676 mm) broad gauge line in 1871.

During 1888 to 1890 Southern Maharathna Railway developed a metre-gauge line from Vijayawada to Marmagova, passing through Guntakal.

The Guntakal–Bangalore line was opened in 1892–93. The metre-gauge Guntakal–Mysore Frontier Railway was opened in 1893. It was operated by Southern Maharathna Railway.

== Electrification ==
- Electrification of Guntakal–Reniguntla section of 310 route km completed in 2013.
- Electrification of Guntakal–Bengaluru section of 293 route km completed in 2016.
- Electrification of Guntakal–Wadi section of 228 route km completed in 2017.
- Electrification of Guntakal–Gunturu section of 430 route km has been completed in 2018

== Diesel Loco Shed ==
Diesel Loco Shed, Guntakal was started as a metre-gauge shed but after gauge conversions in Guntakal and Hubballi divisions a broad-gauge shed was opened in 1995. It houses WAG-7 locos. There is a coaching maintenance depot at Guntakal. Since after overhaul with electric traction, Indian Railways also sanctioned electric loco shed and it holds WAG-7 & WAG-9 class locomotives.

== Classification ==
Guntakal Junction is classified as an A–category station in the Guntakal railway division. Guntakal has been selected for the Adarsh Station Scheme, a scheme for upgradation of stations by the Indian Railways.

Preceding station	Indian Railways	Following station
Nancherla towards ?	South Central Railway zone Mumbai–Chennai line	Timmanacherla towards ?
Mallappa Gate towards ?	South Central Railway zone Vijayawada–Vasco line	Guntakal West towards ?
Terminus	South Central Railway zone Guntakal–KSR Bengaluru line	Hanuman circle towards ?
