= Lokmanya Tilak Terminus–Gorakhpur Express =

Lokmanya Tilak Terminus – Gorakhpur Express
Overview
- Service type: Express
- First service: February 11, 2015; 11 years ago
- Current operator: Central Railway

Route
- Termini: Lokmanya Tilak Terminus (LTT); Gorakhpur Junction (GKP)
- Stops: 19 (2 technical stops)
- Distance travelled: 1,722 km (1,070 miles)
- Average journey time: 33 hours 25 minutes
- Service frequency: Weekly
- Train number: 11081 / 11082

On-board services
- Classes: AC 2 Tier, AC 3 Tier, Sleeper Class, Unreserved Second Class
- Seating arrangements: Yes
- Sleeping arrangements: Yes
- Catering facilities: No

Technical
- Track gauge: 1,676 mm (5 ft 6 in)
- Operating speed: 52 km/h (32 mph)

Lokmanya Tilak Terminus- Gorakhpur Weekly Express is a weekly express train service of the Indian Railways, maintained by Central Railway connecting Lokmanya Tilak Terminus in Maharashtra and Gorakhpur Junction of Uttar Pradesh. It is currently being operated with 11081 and 11082 train numbers on weekly basis.

== History ==
It was introduced in 2014's Railway Budget and began operation on 11 February 2015.

== Timings ==
11081 service starts from Lokmanya Tilak Terminus at 04:35 PM on Wednesdays and reaches Gorakhpur Junction at 02:00 AM on Fridays.

11082 service starts from Gorakhpur Junction at 03:50 PM on Fridays and returns to Lokmanya Tilak Terminus at 11:45 PM on Saturdays.

== Halts ==
11081/11082 Lokmanya Tilak Terminus - Gorakhpur Weekly Express
Halts	Additional information
Lokmanya Tilak Terminus	Source
Kalyan Jn	
Kasara	Technical Halt for Banker Attachment
Igatpuri	Technical Halt for Banker Detachment
Nashik Road	
Bhusaval Jn	
Khandwa Jn	
Itarsi Jn	
Pipariya	
Narsinghpur	
Jabalpur Jn	
Katni Jn	
Maihar	
Satna Jn	
Manikpur Jn	
Prayagraj Chheoki Jn	
Mirzapur	
Varanasi Jn	Rake Reversal
Aunrihar Jn	
Mau Jn	
Bhatni Jn	
Deoria Sadar	
Gorakhpur Jn	Destination

== Coach Composition ==
This train service consists of 22 LHB coaches, consisting of:

- 1 AC Two Tier
- 7 AC Three Tier
- 9 Sleeper Class
- 3 General Second Class
- 2 Luggage Brake and Generator Van

11081 and 11082 train service is operated using one rake, in a rake sharing arrangement (RSA) with 12143 / 12144 Mumbai LTT - Sultanpur Express. The rake is maintained by Lokmanya Tilak Terminus coach depot.
