= Varanasi–Kanpur Central Varuna Express =

Overview
- Service type: Express
- Current operator: Northern Railway zone

Route
- Termini: Kanpur Central (CNB); Varanasi Junction (BSB)
- Stops: 12
- Distance travelled: 355 km (221 mi)
- Average journey time: 6h 50m
- Service frequency: Twice (Note: Runs two days in a week for every direction.)
- Train number: 24227/24228

On-board services
- Classes: Chair Car, General Unreserved
- Seating arrangements: Yes
- Sleeping arrangements: No
- Catering facilities: On-board catering E-catering
- Observation facilities: ICF coach
- Entertainment facilities: No
- Baggage facilities: No
- Other facilities: Below the seats

Technical
- Rolling stock: 2
- Track gauge: 1,676 mm (5 ft 6 in)
- Electrification: Yes
- Operating speed: 52 km/h (32 mph), average including halts 110 km/h (68 mph), maximum speed

"NOTE- THE TRAIN HAS BEEN PERMANENTLY CANCELLED"

The Varanasi–Kanpur Central Varuna Express is an Express train belonging to Northern Railway zone that runs between Kanpur Central and Varanasi Junction in India. It is currently being operated with 24227/24228 train numbers on five days in a week.

== Service ==
The 24227/Varuna Express has an average speed of 52 km/h and covers 355 km in 6h 50m. 24228/Varuna Express has an average speed of 47 km/h and covers 355 km in 7h 30m.

== Route and halts ==
The important halts of the train are:

- Varanasi Junction
- Jaunpur City
- Sri Krishna Nagar
- Sultanpur Junction
- Nihalgarh
- Haidergarh
- Lucknow Charbagh
- Unnao Junction
- Kanpur Central

== Coach composition ==
The train has standard ICF rakes with a maximum speed of 110 km/h. The train consists of 17 coaches:

- 1 Chair Car
- 14 General
- 2 Generators cum Luggage/parcel van

== Traction ==
Both trains are hauled by a Kanpur Loco Shed-based WAP-4 electric locomotive from Kanpur to Varanasi and vice versa.

== See also ==
- Varanasi Junction railway station
- Kanpur Central railway station
- Varuna Express
