= Sarkoni railway station =

Railway station in Uttar Pradesh, India

Sarkoni Railway Station
- Sarkoni railway station

General information
- Location: NH 56 Sarkoni, Jaunpur, Uttar Pradesh, India; India
- Coordinates: 25.66°N 82.73°E
- System: Regional rail and Light rail station
- Owner: Ministry of Railways (India)
- Operator: Indian Railways
- Lines: Varanasi-Sultanpur-Lucknow line Varanasi-Ayodhya-Lucknow line Varanasi-Rae Bareli-Lucknow line
- Platforms: 2
- Tracks: 2
- Connections: Auto stand

Construction
- Structure type: Standard

Other information
- Status: Active
- Station code: SIQ
- Zone(s): Northern Railway
- Division(s): Lucknow NR

History
- Opened: 1872; 154 years ago (Oudh & Rohilkund Railway opened line from Benaras to Lucknow)

Passengers
- 100

Services
Location
- Location within Uttar Pradesh Location within India

Sarkoni railway station (station code SIQ) is located in Sarkoni, Jaunpur, Uttar Pradesh, India. It lies in the Indian Railways network and mainly serves nearby rural and semi-urban areas.

This station is part of Northern Railway Zone's Lucknow NR Division and the Varanasi-Sultanpur-Lucknow line via Jaunpur. It is also part of the Varanasi-Lucknow line and Varanasi-Rae Bareli-Lucknow line.

This station is a category (NSG 6) in Northern Railway.

== Overview ==
Sarkoni Railway station is a low-revenue station, serving over 100 passengers and 2 Passenger train on daily basis. It is under the administrative control of the Northern Railway zone's Lucknow NR railway division.

It is one of the railway stations in Jaunpur district, Uttar Pradesh, India. It is situated on the south-east side of the city about 12 km from Jaunpur Junction Railway Station.

== History ==
The History of Sarkoni Railway Station (SIQ) is closely tied to the development of the strategic rail link between Lucknow and Varanasi, which was vital for connecting the Oudh region with the religious and commercial hub of Banaras.

The line passing through Sarkoni was part of the Oudh and Rohilkhand Railway (O&RR). The stretch connecting Jaunpur to Varanasi (then Benares) was developed in the late 1800s. Sarkoni was established as a small wayside station to serve the rural agrarian population and the nearby Sirkoni village area.

- 1925: The Oudh and Rohilkhand Railway was merged into the East Indian Railway (EIR).
- 1952: Following India's independence and the reorganization of the railways, the station became part of the Northern Railway (NR) zone, under the Lucknow Division, where it remains today.

Historically, Sarkoni was a vital stop for the Jaunpur–Varanasi passenger shuttle, which was the primary mode of transport for local students and workers before the expansion of National Highway 56. While the station's commercial importance has remained low (NSG-6 category), its role as a "relief" or "crossing" station for the busy Zafarabad Junction has been its most consistent historical function.

The station's history is also linked to the local Sarkoni Block, which was one of the early administrative blocks established in the Jaunpur district to manage rural development. The station served as the primary gateway for government officials and supplies reaching this block during the mid-20th century.

== Modernization and upgrades (2010s) ==
For over a century, the station operated with steam and later diesel locomotives on a single track. A major historical milestone occurred in the mid-2010s when the Varanasi–Lucknow via Sultanpur route was prioritized for modernization:

- Electrification: The line was electrified as part of the Indian Railways' mission to phase out diesel.
- Doubling: The track was converted from a single line to a double electric line to handle the heavy traffic between Lucknow and Varanasi. This moved Sarkoni from being a simple rural halt to a modernized station on a high-speed corridor.

== See also ==
- Lucknow Charbagh
- Varanasi Junction
- Jaunpur Junction
- Sultanpur Junction
- Ayodhya Dham Junction
- Rae Bareli Junction
