= Trilochan Mahadev railway station =

Railway station in Uttar Pradesh, India

Trilochan Mahadev Railway Station
- Trilochan Mahadev railway station

General information
- Location: Jaunpur, Uttar Pradesh, India; India
- Coordinates: 25.76°N 82.69°E
- System: Regional rail and Light rail station
- Owner: Ministry of Railways (India)
- Operator: Indian Railways
- Lines: Varanasi-Sultanpur-Lucknow line Varanasi-Ayodhya-Lucknow line Varanasi-Rae Bareli-Lucknow line
- Platforms: 2
- Tracks: 2
- Connections: Auto stand

Construction
- Structure type: Standard

Other information
- Status: Active
- Station code: TLMD
- Zone(s): Northern Railway
- Division(s): Lucknow NR

History
- Opened: 1872; 154 years ago (Oudh & Rohilkund Railway opened line from Benaras to Lucknow)

Passengers
- 100

Services
Location
- Location within Uttar Pradesh Location within India

Trilochan Mahadev railway station (station code TLMD) is located in Jaunpur, Uttar Pradesh, India.

This station is part of Northern Railway Zone's Lucknow NR Division and the Varanasi-Sultanpur-Lucknow line via Jaunpur.

It is also part of the Varanasi-Lucknow line and Varanasi-Rae Bareli-Lucknow line.

This station is a category (HG 3) in Northern Railway.

== Overview ==
Trilochan Mahadev Railway station is a low-revenue station, serving over 100 passengers and 2 Mail/ Express and 10 Passenger train on daily basis. It is under the administrative control of the Northern Railway zone's Lucknow NR railway division.

Trilochan Mahadev Railway station is well connected with many important cultural cites such as New Delhi, Mumbai, Kolkata, Indore, Lucknow, Varanasi, Rishikesh, Prayagraj, Jaunpur, etc.

It is one of the railway stations in Jaunpur district, Uttar Pradesh, India. It is situated on the south side of the city about 35 km from Jaunpur Junction Railway Station.

== History ==
The station's history is from the time of the construction of the broad-gauge railway line from Varanasi to Lucknow, which was opened by the Oudh and Rohilkhand Railway in 1872. TLMD was likely to be established sometime after this main line was built to serve the local population and the prominent pilgrimage site of the Trilochan Mahadev Temple. As a minor halt station.

- Religious significance: The railway line's passage through this area provided easy access to the ancient Trilochan Mahadev Temple, which has been in existence since at least the Tretayuga according to local legends. The station's construction likely made the pilgrimage site more accessible to a wider population.

=== Summary of key events ===
- 1872: The broad-gauge Varanasi-Lucknow line, which the station is located on, was opened by the Oudh and Rohilkhand Railway.
- Post-1872: TLMD was likely to be constructed as a minor halt station to cater to the local population and temple pilgrims.
- Recent Upgrades: The rail lines passing through the station have been electrified and doubled to handle increasing traffic.

== See also ==
- Lucknow Charbagh
- Varanasi Junction
- Sultanpur Junction
- Jaunpur Junction
- Ayodhya Dham Junction
- Rae Bareli Junction
