= Zafarabad Junction railway station =

Railway station in Uttar Pradesh, India

Zafarabad Junction
- Zafarabad Jn.

General information
- Location: Zafarbad Railway Station Road, Zafarabad, Jaunpur district, Uttar Pradesh, 222180; India
- Coordinates: 25.7081094°N 82.7162295°E
- Elevation: 98 m (322 ft)
- Owner: Indian Railways
- Operator: Northern Railway
- Lines: Jaunpur-Sultanpur-Lucknow line Jaunpur-Ayodhya-Lucknow line Jaunpur-Kerakat-Aunrihar line Jaunpur–Prayagraj line Jaunpur–Azamgarh line Jaunpur-Varanasi line
- Platforms: 4
- Tracks: 9
- Connections: Taxi stand, auto stand, Bus stand

Construction
- Structure type: Standard (on-ground station)
- Parking: Available
- Cycle facilities: Available
- Accessible: Disabled access

Other information
- Status: Active
- Station code: ZBD
- Zone(s): Northern Railway
- Division(s): Lucknow NER

History
- Opened: 1872 by Oudh and Rohilkhand Railway
- Rebuilt: At time of World War II

Passengers
- 5000

Services
Location
- Location within Uttar Pradesh Location within India

Zafarabad Junction (station code ZBD) is a railway station in Zafarabad, Jaunpur District, Uttar Pradesh, India.

The station is part of the Northern Railway zone's Lucknow NR Division and partially North Eastern Railway zone's Varanasi Division. This station is also part of Varanasi–Lucknow line via Jaunpur-Ayodhya and Varanasi-Sultanpur-Lucknow line via Jaunpur-Sultanpur.

This station is category (NSG 5) in Northern Railway. This station is situated in south Jaunpur.

Nearby station Jaunpur Junction, Jaunpur City railway station, Sarkoni and Kajgaon

== Overview ==
Zafarabad Junction is a medium revenue station, serving over 5,000 passengers and over 8 trains on daily basis. It is under the administrative control of the Northern Railway Zone's Lucknow NR railway division, and partially of the North Eastern Railway zone's Varanasi railway division.

Zafarabad Junction is well connected with many important cultural cites such as Delhi, Mumbai, Kolkata, Chennai, Jammu, Chandigarh, Dehradun, Jaipur, Ahmedabad, Bhopal, Lucknow, Patna, Guwahati, Raipur, Rameswaram, Haridwar, Tiruchirappalli, Indore, Surat, Vadodara, Vapi, Nagpur, Mathura, Vijayawada, Agra, Durg, Jamshedpur, Kharagpur, etc.

== History ==
- 1872: Initial rail network: The broad-gauge line from Varanasi to Lucknow was opened by the Oudh and Rohilkhand Railway. This established the regional rail presence that Zafarabad would eventually connect to.
- World War II and restoration: The Sultanpur-Zafarabad line was dismantled during World War II, a common practice to repurpose railway materials for the war effort. It was later restored after the war ended, re-establishing Zafarabad's importance as a junction point.
- Post-independence development: In the post-independence era, Zafarabad Junction has seen continuous upgrades to its infrastructure. The tracks were doubled and electrified to handle the increasing rail traffic.
- Recent improvements: In recent years, significant infrastructure projects have continued, including the construction of a bypass chord line in 2023. This bypass aims to reduce congestion and improve connectivity between Jaunpur Junction and Jaunpur City stations.

== Key Modernization Projects ==
As a recipient of the Amrit Bharat Station Scheme, Zafarabad Junction is undergoing a significant modernization effort. The scheme focuses on continuous, long-term development to transform stations into modern, integrated transport hubs.

Jaunpur-Zafarabad line doubling

A major railway line doubling project is underway between Jaunpur Junction and Zafarabad, covering a 6.28 km stretch.

- Cost: Estimated at ₹1,940 million.
- Objective: To significantly enhance railway capacity and efficiency on this critical corridor.
- Progress: As of late 2025, the project was under implementation, with work on the tracks, signals, and a new bridge over the Gomti River underway.

Upgraded passenger amenities

The Amrit Bharat scheme includes several improvements aimed at enhancing passenger convenience and comfort:

- Improved access: This involves widening access roads, enhancing signage, creating dedicated pedestrian pathways, and better lighting.
- Better facilities: Upgrades include resurfaced platforms with proper shelters, renovated waiting rooms and toilets, and the potential installation of lifts and escalators.
- Integrated design: The scheme aims to integrate the station with both sides of the city, improving overall connectivity and traffic flow.
- "One Station, One Product" kiosks: The station will feature kiosks promoting local products, supporting local artisans and businesses.

Technological and environmental enhancements

The modernization effort also incorporates advanced technology and sustainability measures:

- Ballastless tracks: Where feasible, the scheme includes providing ballastless tracks for a smoother and more stable journey.
- Eco-friendly solutions: Sustainable and environment-friendly solutions will be integrated into the station's design.
- Better security: While not specific to Zafarabad, the scheme often includes upgrades to safety and security technology.

These comprehensive upgrades aim to transform Zafarabad Junction from a basic transit point into a more functional, modern, and aesthetically pleasing transport center for the Jaunpur region.

== Trains ==
Some of the trains that run from Zafarabad are:

- Jaunpur–Rae Bareli Express
- Godaan Express
- Howrah–Amritsar Express
- Suhaildev Superfast Express
- Doon Express
- Ayodhya Superfast Express
- Varanasi–Bareilly Express
- Sabarmati Express
- Marudhar Express (via Sultanpur)
- Ayodhya–Pandit Deen Dayal Upadhyaya Junction Passenger
- Ghazipur–Varanasi DEMU
- Varanasi–Sultanpur Passenger
- Farakka Express (via Ayodhya)
- Farakka Express (via Sultanpur)
- Prayag–Jaunpur Passenger
- BSB SLN SF Passenger
- BSB LKO SF Passenger

== See also ==
- Jaunpur Junction railway station
- Kerakat railway station
- Varanasi Junction railway station
- Ghazipur City railway station
- Varanasi–Sultanpur–Lucknow line
