= Trilochan =

Trilochan is a given name and surname. People with the name include:

- Trilochan Singh
- Trilochan Pokhrel
- Trilochan Mohapatra
- Trilochan Sastry
- Trilochan Sahoo
- Trilochan Shastri
- Trilochan Pradhan
- Trilochan Mal
- Trilochan Bhatta
- Trilochan Singh Brar
- Trilochan Singh Wazir
- Bhagat Trilochan
- Bhai Trilochan Singh Panesar

== See also ==
- Trilochan Mahadev railway station
- Trilochan Mahadev Temple
- Trilochan Kanungo
- Trilochan Bhatta cabinet
- Trilochan Ashtami
