= Ayodhya Cantt – Delhi Express =

Train in India

Ayodhya – Delhi Express
Overview
- Service type: Express
- Locale: Delhi & Uttar Pradesh
- Current operator: Northern Railways

Route
- Termini: Faizabad Junction; Delhi Junction (DLI)
- Stops: 9
- Distance travelled: 614 km (382 mi)
- Average journey time: 11 hours 10 minutes
- Service frequency: Daily
- Train number: 14205 / 14206

On-board services
- Classes: AC 2-tier, AC 3-tier, Sleeper class, General unreserved
- Seating arrangements: Yes
- Sleeping arrangements: Yes
- Catering facilities: On-board catering, E-catering
- Observation facilities: Rake sharing with 14207/14208 Padmavat Express
- Other facilities: Below the seats

Technical
- Rolling stock: LHB coach
- Track gauge: 1,676 mm (5 ft 6 in)
- Operating speed: 55 km/h (34 mph) average with halts
Route map
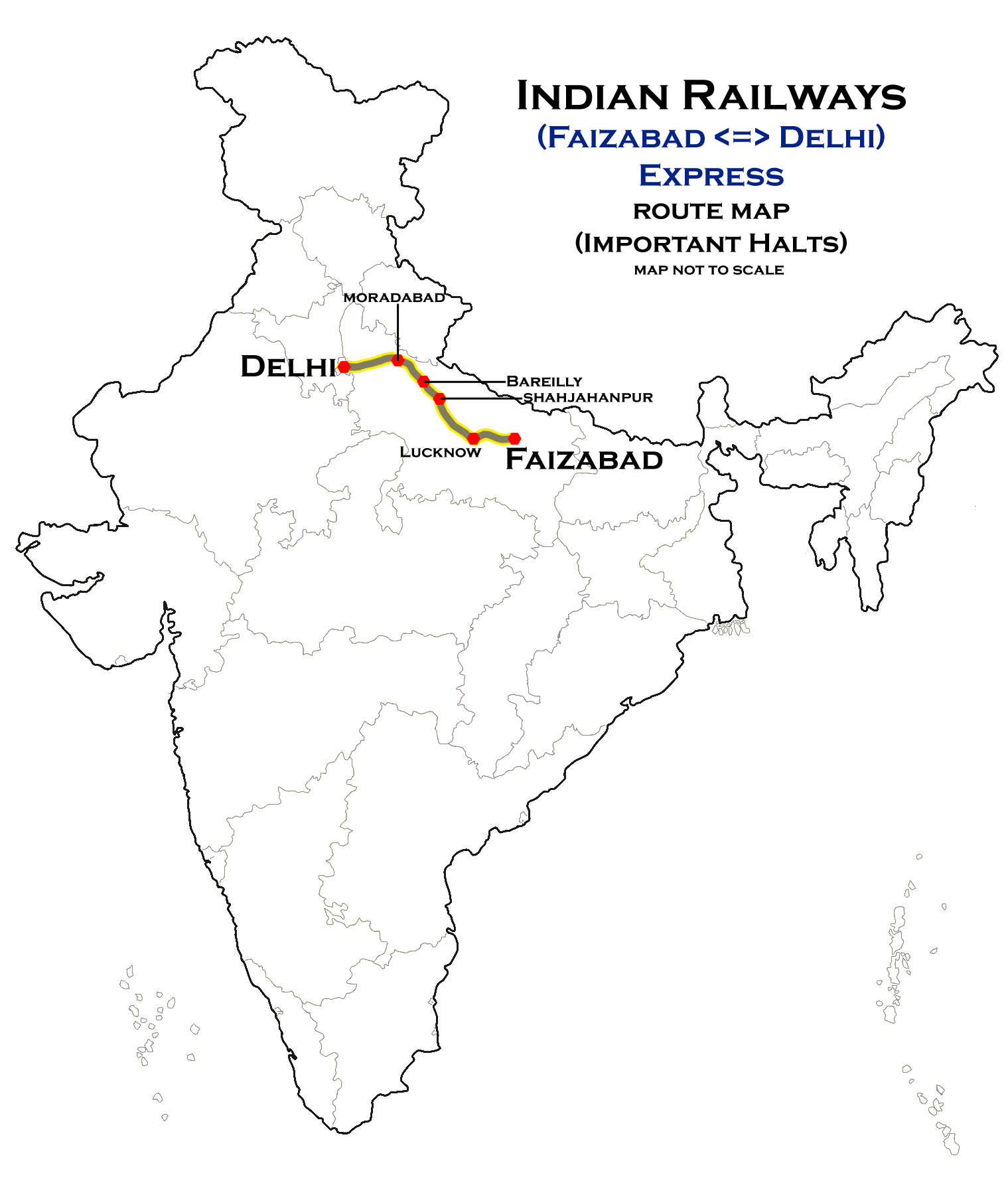
- Ayodhya–Delhi Express route map

The 14205 / 14206 Ayodhya–Delhi Express is a train which runs between Ayodhya and Delhi. Though there are several trains that run to Delhi via Ayodhya, Ayodhya–Delhi Express is the only train which starts at Ayodhya to Delhi. It runs daily from Ayodhya to Delhi and from Delhi to Ayodhya.

== Route and halts ==
- Ayodhya Junction
- Daryabad
- Barabanki Junction
- Lucknow Charbagh
- Shahjahanpur
- Bareilly Junction
- Rampur Junction
- Moradabad Junction
- Hapur Junction
- Ghaziabad Junction
- Delhi Junction

== Traction ==
It is hauled by a Ghaziabad-based WAP-7 or Ghaziabad-based WAP-5 locomotive for entire journey.

== Rake sharing ==
The train sharing its rake with 14207/14208 Padmavat Express.

== Timings ==
=== From Ayodhya to Delhi ===
Train no.	Train name	Starting station	Destination	MON	TUE	WED	THU	FRI	SAT	SUN
14205	AY DLI EX.	Ayodhya Junction at 22:00 at 17:25 from 1 October 2016	Delhi Junction at 9:35 at 5:55 from 2 October 2016	YES	YES	YES	YES	YES	YES	YES

=== From Delhi to Ayodhya ===
Train no.	Train name	Starting station	Destination	MON	TUE	WED	THU	FRI	SAT	SUN
14206	DLI AY EX.	Delhi Junction at 18:20	Ayodhya Junction at 7:50	YES	YES	YES	YES	YES	YES	YES

== See also ==
- Saket Express
- Ayodhya Cantt – Lokmanya Tilak Superfast Express
- Ayodhya Junction
