= Rudauli railway station =

Railway station in Uttar Pradesh, India

Rudauli
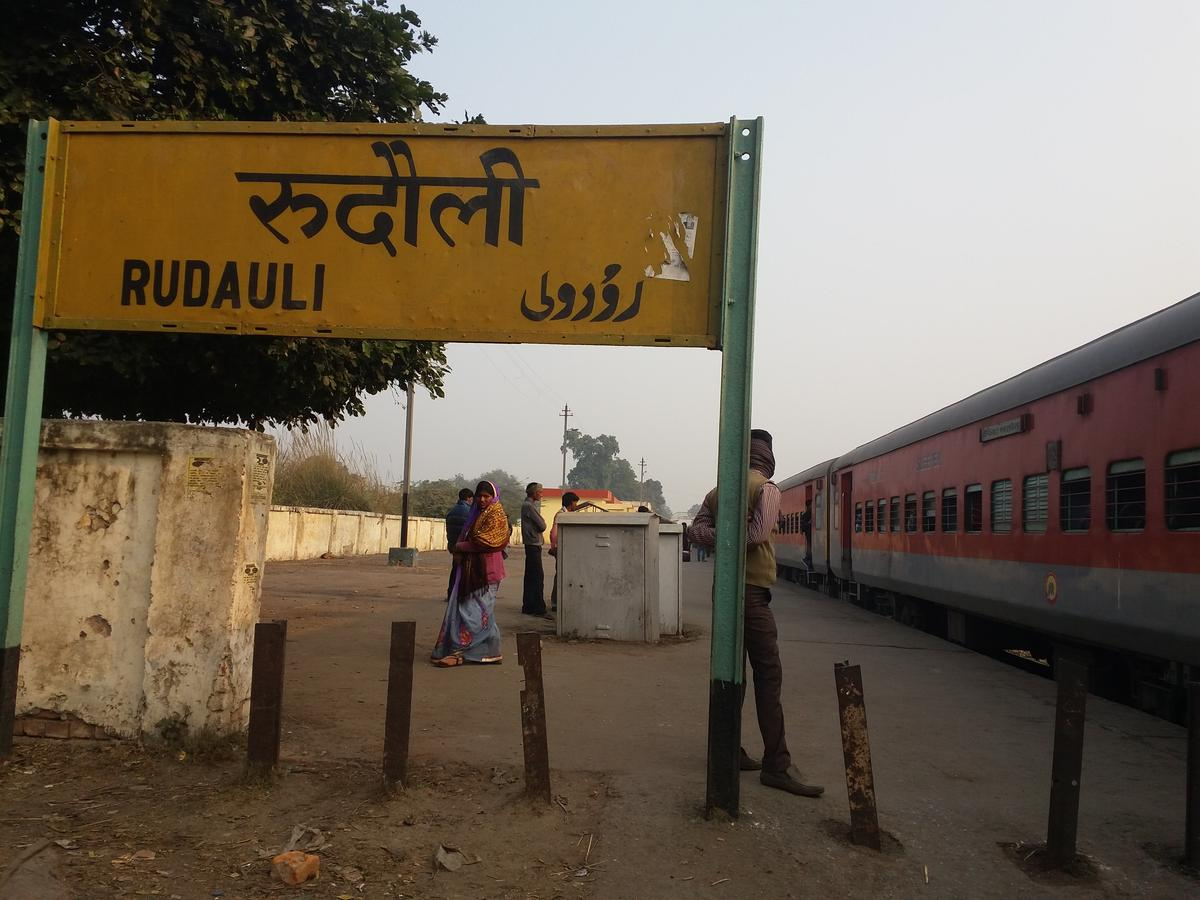
- Main entrance of Rudauli railway station

General information
- Location: Rudauli, Ayodhya district, Uttar Pradesh; India
- Coordinates: 26.7592278°N 81.7307614°E
- System: Light rail & Commuter rail station
- Owner: Ministry of Railways (India)
- Operator: Indian Railways
- Line: Varanasi–Jaunpur–Ayodhya–Lucknow Line
- Platforms: 2
- Tracks: double
- Connections: Central bus station, Taxi stand, Auto stand

Construction
- Structure type: At grade
- Parking: Available
- Cycle facilities: Available
- Accessible: Disabled access

Other information
- Station code: RDL
- Zone(s): Northern Railway
- Division(s): Lucknow NR
- Fare zone: Northern Railways

History
- Opened: 1874; 152 years ago
- Electrified: not yet
- Former names: Oudh and Rohilkhand Railway
Location
- Location within India Location within Uttar Pradesh

Rudauli railway station is a railway station in Ayodhya district, Uttar Pradesh in Northern India. And it is well connected with Delhi, Kanpur, Lucknow, Varanasi. Rudauli is the busiest station between Lucknow to Varanasi after Ayodhya Junction.

== Services ==
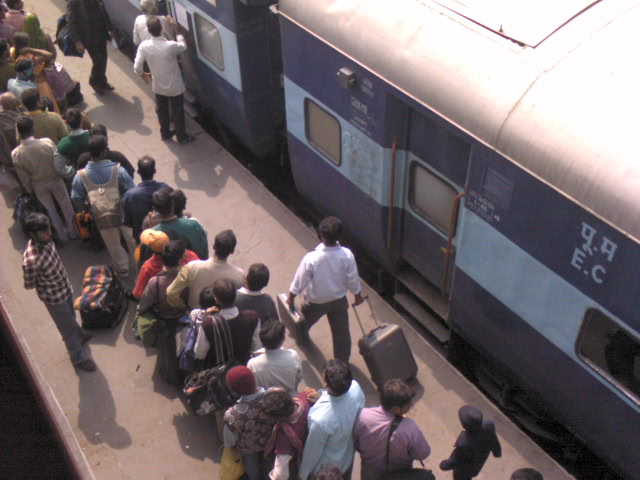
People boarding a train

The Indian Railways network connects Ayodhya directly with Kanpur (3.5 hours) Lucknow (2 hours.), Varanasi (5 hours.) and Prayagraj (6 hours). Direct trains such as Azamgarh–Delhi via Rudauli/ Delhi Junction, Lucknow Junction, Aligarh, Jhansi, Varanasi and Patna on a weekly basis. A few mail express trains also connect Rudauli to Kolkata, and Ajmer.

There are intercity train between Ayodhya Cantt and Lucknow via Rudauli.

== See also ==
- Faizabad Delhi Express
- Saket Express
- Faizabad Superfast Express
- Ayodhya Junction
- Lucknow Charbagh railway station
