= Sri Krishna Nagar railway station =

Railway station in Uttar Pradesh, India

Shri Krishna Nagar railway station
- Shri Krishna Nagar

General information
- Location: Badlapur, Jaunpur District, Uttar Pradesh; India
- Coordinates: 25.8833°N 82.4492°E
- Elevation: 92 metres (302 ft)
- Owner: Indian Railways
- Operator: Northern Railway
- Line: Varanasi–Sultanpur–Lucknow line
- Platforms: 2
- Tracks: 4

Construction
- Structure type: Standard

Other information
- Status: Active
- Station code: SKN
- Zone(s): Northern Railway
- Division(s): Lucknow NR

Passengers
- 2,000
Location
- Location within Uttar Pradesh Location within India

Shri Krishna Nagar Railway Station (station code SKN) is a small railway station in Badlapur Town, Jaunpur, Uttar Pradesh, India.

The station is part of the Northern Railway zone's Lucknow NR Division and the Varanasi-Sultanpur-Lucknow line via Jaunpur-Sultanpur.

This station is a category (NSG 6) in Northern Railway. This station is situated in southwest Jaunpur.

Nearby stations include Sarai Harkhu (SVZ), Harpalganj (HRPG) and Jaunpur City (JOP).

== Overview ==
Shri Krishna Nagar railway station is a low-revenue station, serving over 2,000 passengers and over 6 Mail/Express and 5 Passenger trains on a daily basis. It is under the administrative control of the Northern Railway zone's Lucknow NR railway division.

Shri Krishna Nagar railway station is well connected with many important cultural cites such as Delhi, Lucknow, Varanasi, Raxaul, Muzzafarpur, Jaunpur, etc.

== History ==
- Larger network established (1872): The history of rail in the region began when the Oudh and Rohilkhand Railway opened a broad-gauge line connecting Varanasi and Lucknow in 1872. The main railway station in Jaunpur Junction (JNU) was founded as part of this project.
- Branch lines constructed: Shri Krishna Nagar was likely built sometime after 1872 to serve the local town of Badlapur, as the rail network was extended to connect smaller towns in the region. It was not a major station during this initial construction phase.
- Second rail line (1904): The region's network was further expanded in 1904 when the Bengal and North Western Railway opened a broad-gauge line from Aunrihar to Jaunpur via Kerakat.

== Key Modernization Projects ==
Shri Krishna Nagar (SKN) railway station is part of the Amrit Bharat Station Scheme, a national program by the Indian Railways to modernize and upgrade stations across the country. The foundation stone for this project was virtually laid by Prime Minister Narendra Modi in February 2024.

Planned improvements

The modernization at SKN is comprehensive and focuses on improving infrastructure and passenger amenities. These upgrades include:

- Station Building: Renovation of the existing structure with a focus on an improved facade.
- Waiting Facilities: Upgraded waiting rooms, waiting halls, and toilets.
- Platforms: Modernization of the two platforms and improvements to platform shelters.
- Circulating Area: Redesigned and improved area for smooth traffic flow.
- Accessibility: Enhancements for persons with disabilities (Divyangjan).
- Other Amenities: Better lighting and upgraded facilities.

Other improvements Beyond the Amrit Bharat Scheme, track renewal and repair work have also been conducted at the station, with work being reported as recently as January 2025.

- This work involved replacing old track switches with higher-capacity rails to increase the speed of trains.
- Prior to the upgrades, trains on the Varanasi-Lucknow route operated at a maximum speed of 110 km/h, but the new rails allow for speeds of up to 130 km/h.

== See also ==
- Varanasi Junction railway station
- Jaunpur City railway station
- Sultanpur Junction railway station
- Lucknow Charbagh railway station
