= Varanasi–Lucknow Intercity Express (via Pratapgarh) =

Train in India

Varanasi Lucknow Intercity Express (via Pratapgarh)

Overview
- Service type: Express
- First service: 16 May 2013
- Current operator: Northern Railways

Route
- Termini: Varanasi Junction; Lucknow NR
- Stops: 9
- Distance travelled: 302 km (188 mi)
- Average journey time: 5 hours 45 mins as 14219 Varanasi Lucknow Express, 6 hours 30 mins as 14220 Lucknow Varanasi Express
- Service frequency: Except Sunday
- Train number: 14219 / 14220

On-board services
- Classes: AC Chair Car, General Unreserved
- Seating arrangements: Yes
- Sleeping arrangements: No
- Catering facilities: No

Technical
- Rolling stock: Standard Indian Railways coaches
- Operating speed: 110 km/h (68 mph) maximum 44.20 km/h (27 mph) including halts.

The 14219 / 20 Varanasi–Lucknow Intercity Express (via Pratapgarh) is an Intercity Express train belonging to Northern Railway zone that runs between Varanasi Junction & Lucknow NR of Uttar Pradesh in India. It is going to become Superfast Express soon and in future It will Intercity Superfast Express train.

It operates as train number 14219 from Varanasi Junction to Lucknow NR and as train number 14220 in the reverse direction serving the state of Uttar Pradesh.

It is one of 3 trains that run between Varanasi Junction to Lucknow NR, the others being 14227/28 Varuna Express & 14203 / 04 Varanasi Lucknow Intercity Express.

== Coaches ==
The 14219 / 20 Varanasi Lucknow Intercity Express has 1 AC Chair Car, 12 General Unreserved & 2 SLR (Seating cum Luggage Rake) Coaches. It does not carry a Pantry car coach.

As is customary with most train services in India, Coach Composition may be amended at the discretion of Indian Railways depending on demand.

== Service ==
The 14219 Varanasi Lucknow Intercity Express covers the distance of 302 km (188 mi) in 6 hours 15 mins (48.32 km/h) and in 7 hours 25 mins as 14220 Lucknow Varanasi Express (40.72 km/h).

As the average speed of the train is below 55 km/h (34 mph), as per Indian Railways rules, its fare does not include a Superfast surcharge.

== Routing ==
The 14219 / 20 Varanasi Lucknow Intercity Express runs from Varanasi Junction via Bhadohi, Janghai Pratapgarh, Amethi, Rae Bareli Junction to Lucknow NR.

== Traction ==
As the route is yet to be fully electrified, it is hauled by a Lucknow based WDM 3A for its entire journey.

== Operation ==
14219 / 20 Varanasi Lucknow Intercity Express runs every day except Sunday in both directions.

== See also ==
- Dedicated Intercity trains of India
