= Maa Ahorwa Bhawani Dham railway station =

Railway station in Uttar Pradesh, India

Maa Ahorwa Bhawani Dham railway station Akbarganj railway station

General information
- Location: SH 31, Akbarganj, Uttar Pradesh; India
- Coordinates: 26.531456°N 81.501628°E
- Elevation: 112 metres (367 ft)
- System: Indian Railways station
- Owner: Indian Railways
- Operator: Northern Railway
- Line: Varanasi–Lucknow line
- Platforms: 2
- Tracks: 2

Construction
- Structure type: Standard (on-ground station)
- Parking: No
- Cycle facilities: No

Other information
- Status: Construction – electric-line doubling
- Station code: MABM (formerly AKJ)
- Zone(s): Northern Railway
- Division(s): Lucknow NR
Location
- Location within Uttar Pradesh Location within India

Maa Ahorwa Bhawani Dham railway station, formerly known as Akbarganj railway station (station code: MABM, old code AKJ) is a small railway station in Amethi district, Uttar Pradesh. It serves Akbarganj town. The station consists of two platforms. The platforms are not well sheltered, and the train station lacks many facilities including water and sanitation. The Uttar Pradesh government changed the name of the station from Akbarganj to Maa Ahorwa Bhawani Dham on 27 August 2024.
