= Saket Express =

Train in India

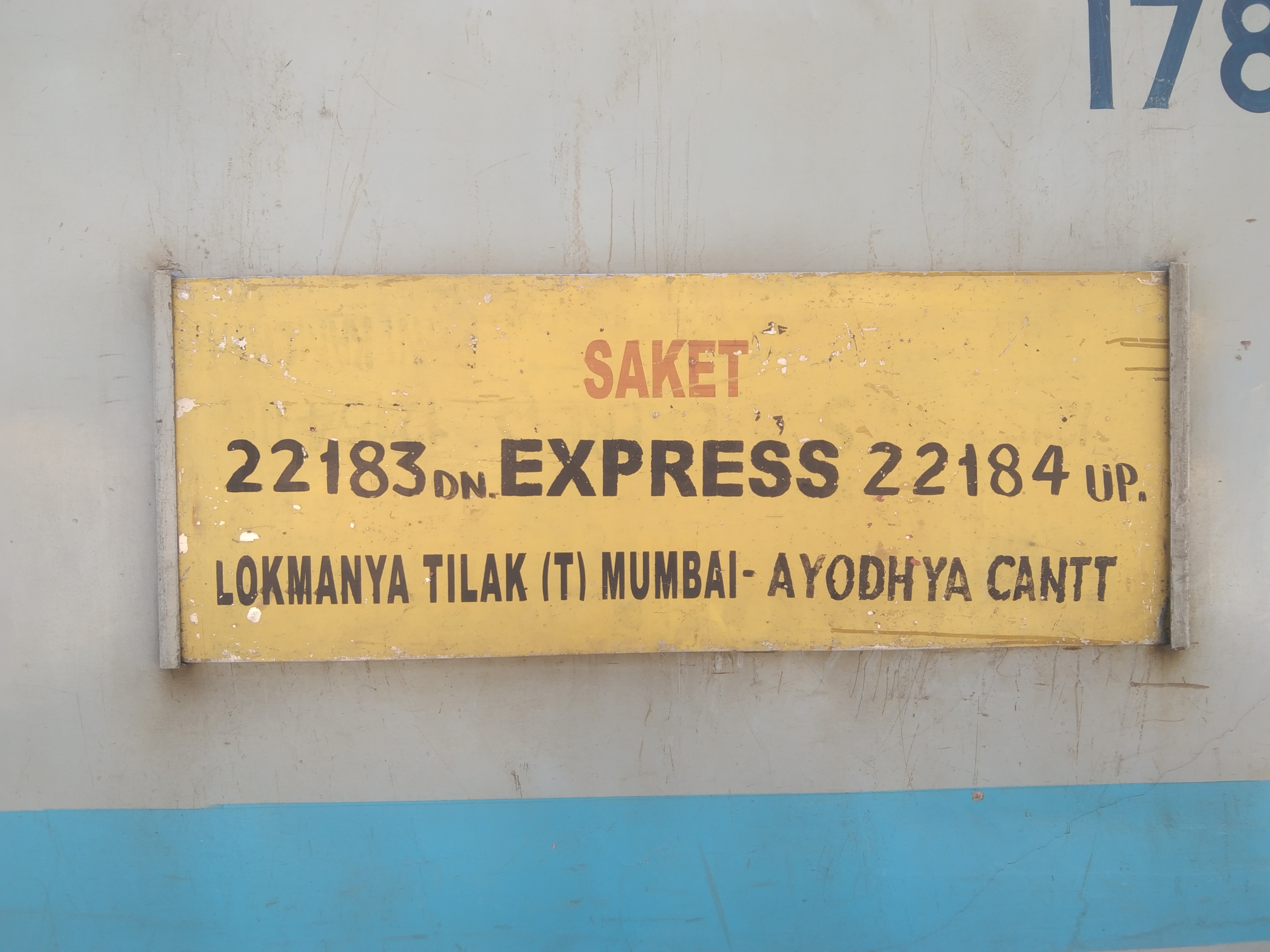
- Saket Express train board.

Overview
- Service type: Express
- Locale: Maharashtra, Madhya Pradesh & Uttar Pradesh
- Current operator(s): Central Railway

Route
- Termini: Mumbai LTT (LTT); Ayodhya Cantt. (AYC)
- Stops: 18
- Distance travelled: 1,501 km (933 mi)
- Average journey time: 26 hours 05 minutes
- Service frequency: Bi-weekly
- Train number(s): 22183 / 22184

On-board services
- Class(es): AC First Class, AC 2 Tier, AC 3 Tier, Sleeper Class, General Unreserved
- Seating arrangements: No
- Sleeping arrangements: Yes
- Catering facilities: On-board catering, E-catering
- Observation facilities: Large windows
- Baggage facilities: No
- Other facilities: Below the seats

Technical
- Rolling stock: LHB coach
- Track gauge: 1,676 mm (5 ft 6 in)
- Operating speed: 57 km/h (35 mph) average including halts.

The 22183 / 22184 Saket Express is an express train that runs twice per week between Ayodhya Cantt. railway station and Lokmanya Tilak Terminus, Mumbai. The train was introduced in 1988 and the inaugural run took place on 7 May 1988.

== History ==
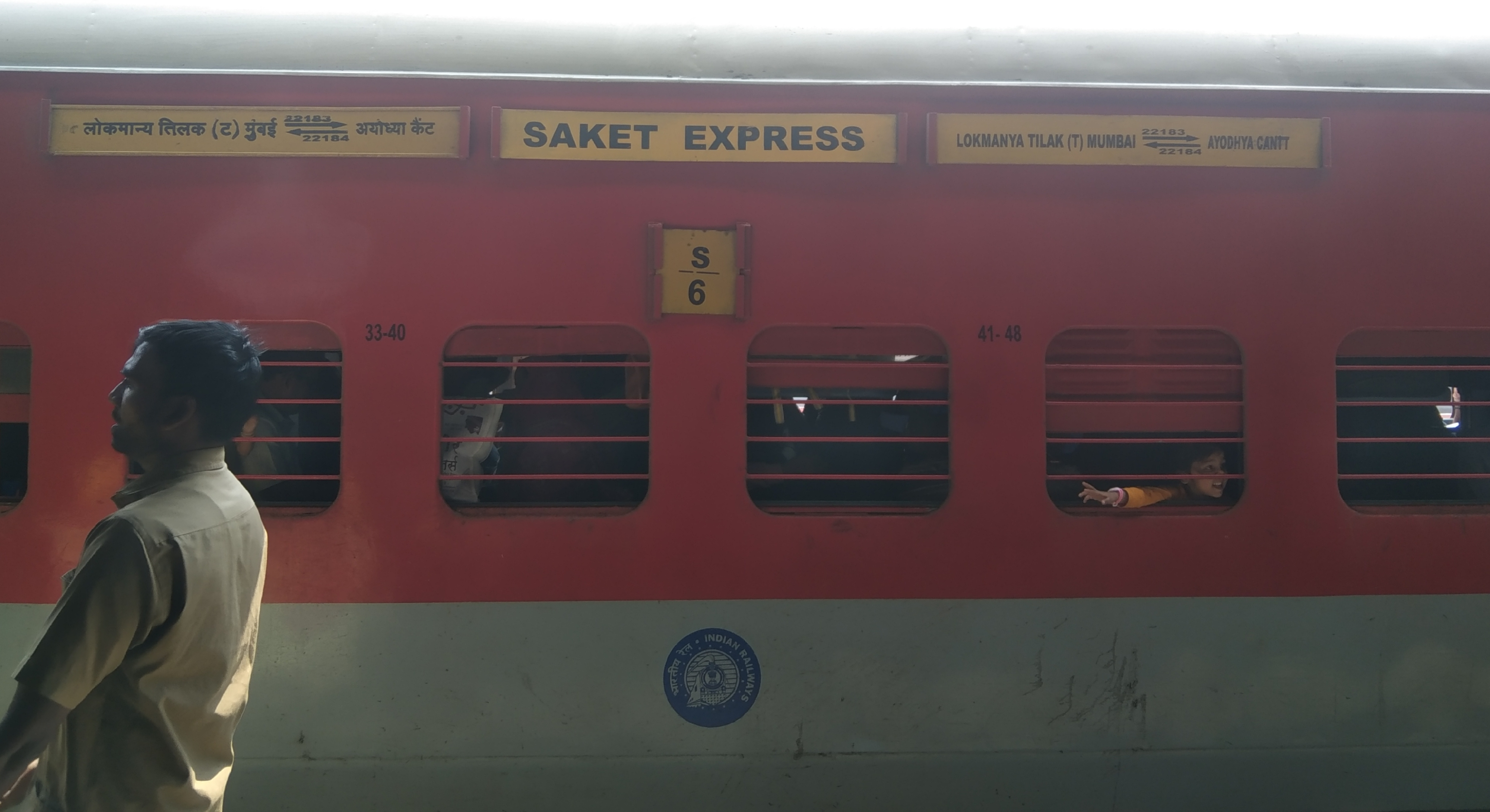
Saket Express

In the beginning the train used to run between Bombay Victoria Terminus (station code VT) [now Chhatrapati Shivaji Maharaj Terminus Mumbai, (station code CSMT)] and Ayodhya (station code AY). But from 7 December 2024, the starting station was shifted from Mumbai CSMT to Lokmanya Tilak Terminus Kurla (station code LTT) from where it currently runs.

Saket Express is one of the two trains that connect Ayodhya to Mumbai via Sultanpur Junction and Pratapgarh Junction, the other being the Ayodhya Superfast Express, which runs once a week via Shahganj Junction and Jaunpur Junction.

== See also ==
- Ayodhya - Delhi Express
- Ayodhya Superfast Express
- Ayodhya Junction railway station
