= Varanasi–Lucknow Charbagh Varuna Express =

Train in India

Varuna Express

Overview
- Service type: Express
- Current operator: Northern Railways

Route
- Termini: Varanasi Junction; Lucknow NR
- Stops: 9
- Distance travelled: 284 km (176 mi)
- Average journey time: 4 hours 55 mins as 14227 Varanasi Lucknow Varuna Express, 5 hours 35 mins as 14228 Lucknow Varanasi Varuna Express
- Service frequency: Monday & Thursday.
- Train number: 14227 / 14228

On-board services
- Classes: AC Chair Car, General Unreserved
- Seating arrangements: Yes
- Sleeping arrangements: No
- Catering facilities: No

Technical
- Rolling stock: Standard Indian Railways coaches
- Electrification: Yes
- Operating speed: 110 km/h (68 mph) maximum 54.10 km/h (34 mph) including halts.

The Varuna Express 14227 / 28 Varanasi–Lucknow is an Express train belonging to Indian Railways – Northern Railway zone that runs between Varanasi Junction and Lucknow NR in India.

It operates as train number 14227 from Varanasi Junction to Lucknow NR and as train number 14228 in the reverse direction, serving the state of Uttar Pradesh.

It is named after the Lord of Water–Varuna is one of three trains that run between Varanasi Junction and Lucknow NR, the others being 14219/20 Varanasi–Lucknow Express & 14203 / 04 Varanasi–Lucknow Intercity Express.

== Coaches ==
The 14227 / 28 Varanasi–Lucknow Varuna Express has 1 AC Chair Car, 14 General Unreserved and 2 SLR (Seating cum Luggage Rake) coaches. It does not carry a pantry car.

As is customary with most train services in India, coach composition may be amended at the discretion of Indian Railways depending on demand.

== Service ==
The 14227 Varanasi–Lucknow Varuna Express covers the distance of 284 km (176 mi) in 4 hours 55 mins (57.76 km/h) and in 5 hours 35 mins as 14228 Lucknow–Varanasi Varuna Express (50.87 km/h).

== Routing ==
The 14227 / 28 Varanasi–Lucknow Varuna Express runs from Varanasi Junction via Jaunpur City railway station, Sultanpur, Haidergarh to Lucknow NR.

== Traction ==
As the route is fully electrified, it is hauled by a Kanpur-based WAP-7 for its entire journey.

== Operation ==
14227 / 28 Varanasi–Lucknow Varuna Express runs on Monday and Thursday in both directions.
