= SKN (disambiguation) =

SKN is an acronym for Saint Kitts and Nevis, an island country in the Caribbean.

SKN may also refer to:

== People ==
- Sreekandan Nair, Indian media personality

== Sports teams ==
- SKN FC Kebumen, an Indonesian association football team
- SKN St. Pölten, an Austrian association football team
- SKN St. Pölten (basketball), an Austrian basketball team
- SKN St. Pölten (women), an Austrian women's football team

== Transport ==
- Shan King (North) stop, Hong Kong, MTR station code
- Sri Krishna Nagar railway station, Uttar Pradesh, India, Indian railways code
- St Keyne Wishing Well Halt railway station, England, National Rail code
- Stokmarknes Airport, Skagen, Norway, IATA code
