= Haidergarh railway station =

Railway station in Uttar Pradesh, India

General information
- Location: State Highway 13, Haidergarh, Uttar Pradesh; India
- Coordinates: 26.620785°N 81.3615235°E
- Elevation: 116 m (381 ft)
- System: Indian Railways station
- Owner: Indian Railways
- Operator: Northern Railway
- Line: Varanasi–Sultanpur–Lucknow line
- Platforms: 2 BG
- Tracks: 3 BG
- Connections: Taxi stand, auto stand

Construction
- Structure type: Standard (on-ground station)
- Parking: Available
- Cycle facilities: Available
- Accessible: Disabled access

Other information
- Status: Active
- Station code: HGH
- Zone(s): Northern Railway
- Division(s): Lucknow NER
Location
- Location within India Location within Uttar Pradesh

Haidergarh railway station is a railway station in Barabanki district, Uttar Pradesh. Its code is HGH. It serves Haidergarh town. The station consists of two platforms. The main line of the Oudh and Rohilkhand Railway from Lucknow to Rae Bareli and Mughal Sarai serves the south-western portion.

== See also ==
- Varanasi Junction railway station
- Sultanpur Junction railway station
- Varanasi–Sultanpur–Lucknow line
