= Varanasi–Lucknow Intercity Express =

Varanasi Lucknow Intercity Express
Overview
- Service type: Express
- First service: 24 December 2003
- Current operator: Northern Railways

Route
- Termini: Varanasi Junction; Lucknow NR
- Stops: 12
- Distance travelled: 302 km (188 mi)
- Average journey time: 5 hours 45 mins as 14203 Varanasi Lucknow Intercity Express, 6 hours 30 mins as 14204 Lucknow Varanasi Intercity Express
- Service frequency: Daily
- Train number: 14203 / 14204

On-board services
- Classes: AC Chair Car, General Unreserved
- Seating arrangements: Yes
- Sleeping arrangements: No
- Catering facilities: No

Technical
- Rolling stock: Standard Indian Railways coaches
- Operating speed: 110 km/h (68 mph) maximum 49.31 km/h (31 mph) including halts.

The 14203 / 04 Varanasi Lucknow Intercity Express is an Express train belonging to Indian Railways - Northern Railway zone that runs between Varanasi Junction and Lucknow NR in India.

It operates as train number 14203 from Varanasi Junction to Lucknow NR and as train number 14204 in the reverse direction serving the state of Uttar Pradesh.

It is one of 3 trains that run between Varanasi Junction to Lucknow NR, the others being 14219/20 Varanasi Lucknow Express and 14227 / 28 Varuna Express.

== Coaches ==
The 14203 / 04 Varanasi Lucknow Intercity Express has 1 AC Chair Car, 11 General Unreserved and 2 SLR (Seating cum Luggage Rake) Coaches. It does not carry a Pantry car coach.

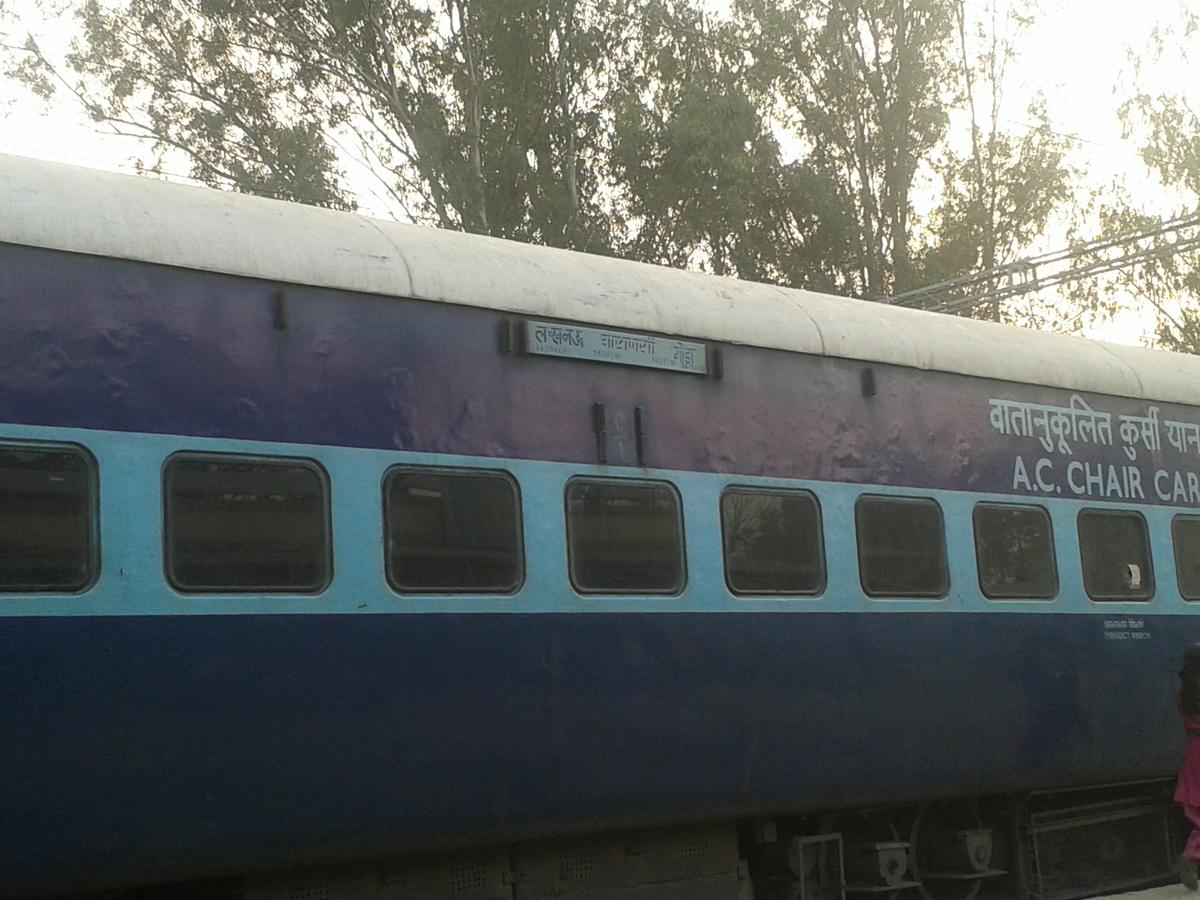
AC Chair Car of Lucknow Varanasi Intercity Express

As is customary with most train services in India, Coach Composition may be amended at the discretion of Indian Railways depending on demand.

== Service ==
The 14203 Varanasi Lucknow Intercity Express covers the distance of 302 km (188 mi) in 5 hours 45 mins (52.52 km/h) and in 6 hours 30 mins as 14204 Lucknow Varanasi Intercity Express (50.87 km/h).

As the average speed of the train is below 55 km/h (34 mph), as per Indian Railways rules, its fare does not include a Superfast surcharge.

== Routeing ==
The 14203 / 04 Varanasi Lucknow Intercity Express runs from Varanasi Junction via Janghai Junction, Amethi, Rae Bareli Junction to Lucknow NR.

== Traction ==
As the route is now fully electrified, it is hauled by a Ghaziabad based WAP 7 or WAP 4 for its entire journey.

== Operation ==
14203 / 04 Varanasi Lucknow Intercity Express runs on a daily basis in both directions.

== See also ==
- Dedicated Intercity trains of India
