= Trilochan Mahadev Temple =

Hindu Temple in Uttar Pradesh, India

- Trilochan Mahadev Temple

- Trilochan Mahadev Temple

Religion
- Affiliation: Hinduism
- District: Jaunpur
- Deity: Lord Shiva (Mahadev)
- Festival: Maha Shivaratri

Location
- Location: Jaunpur
- State: Uttar Pradesh
- Country: India
- Interactive map of Trilochan Mahadev Temple
- Coordinates: 25.575677°N 82.786441°E

Architecture
- Type: Mandir

Trilochan Mahadev Temple is a Hindu temple dedicated to Lord Shiva. It is located in Trilochan Dham, in Jaunpur, Uttar Pradesh, India. The temple is a Hindu pilgrimage site. The presiding deity is known by the names Trilochan (त्रिलोचन) meaning The Three-Eyed One and Mahadev (महादेव) meaning God of Gods. This is an ancient temple of Mahadeva.

== History ==
The History of the Trilochan Mahadev Temple is a blend of ancient scriptural mentions, divine legends, and a miraculous resolution to a local dispute.

Ancient and Mythological Roots:

- Treta Yuga Origins: Devotees believe the temple dates back to the Treta Yuga (the age of Lord Rama). It is said that Lord Shiva appeared here by "penetrating Hades" (Patala-bhed) to manifest himself.
- Scriptural Mention: The temple's historical and spiritual importance is documented in the Skanda Purana (specifically page 674), which lists it as one of the most significant "awakened" shrines in the Kashi (Varanasi) region.
- The Yagya of Lord Brahma: Another legend states that Lord Brahma once organized a grand yagya (sacrificial ritual) at this location, after which Lord Shiva manifested to reside there permanently.

== Legends ==
The folklore of the Trilochan Mahadev Temple in Jaunpur is defined by several miraculous legends that establish the temple's divine origin and its spiritual authority over the surrounding region.

The Legend of the Tilted Shivalinga

One of the most prominent folk stories involves a boundary dispute between the villages of Rehti and Lahangpur (also referred to as Dingurpur).

The Conflict: The Shivalinga appeared exactly where the boundaries of the two villages met, leading to a heated disagreement over ownership. The Divine Test: To resolve the conflict, a panchayat decided to let Lord Shiva himself choose his home. The temple doors were locked with separate locks from both villages and left overnight. The Miracle: At dawn, the doors were opened to find the Shivalinga had miraculously bent toward the north, leaning into the territory of Rehati village. This settled the dispute permanently, and the deity remains physically tilted today as a testament to this choice.

Discovery by the Shepherd

The temple's physical discovery is rooted in a "Swayambhu" (self-manifested) legend:

The Unusual Cow: A shepherd noticed that one of his cows would return from the forest every evening with no milk. The Reveal: Following the cow, he saw her standing over a particular spot in the forest and spontaneously shedding all her milk on the ground. The Excavation: Villagers began digging at that location and uncovered the Shivalinga. Legend says they dug for days but could never find the base of the stone, concluding it was Patal-bhedi (piercing through to the underworld).

== Festivals ==
The Trilochan Mahadev Temple in Jaunpur is a major center for Shaivite celebrations. The temple hosts hundreds of thousands of devotees for its primary festivals, particularly Maha Shivaratri, which saw record-breaking crowds.

- Maha Shivaratri: The most significant annual event at the temple. Every year approximately 2.5 lakh devotees performs Jalabhishek on the day. The district administration and police set up extensive security, including medical stalls and crowd-control barriers.
- Shravan (Sawan) Month: A month-long period of heightened devotion. Every Monday (Somwar) is particularly auspicious, with devotees often arriving after a Kanwar Yatra to offer holy water to the Swayambhu Shivling.
- Dala Chhath: Thousands of women gather at the Pilpila Sarovar (temple pond) to offer Arghya to the setting and rising sun. The temple complex and pond get decorated with divine lighting for this folk festival.
- Trilochanashtami: Celebrated on the eighth day of the Shukla Paksha in the month of Jyeshta, this day is specifically dedicated to the three-eyed form of Shiva.

== Transport ==
The Trilochan Mahadev Temple is located in Jaunpur, and is well-connected by road and rail, primarily via the Varanasi-Lucknow route.

By Rail:

- Trilochan Mahadev Station (TLMD): This is the closest railway station, located approximately 2 km from the temple.
- JalalGanj Station (JLL): Located about 4–5 km away from the Temple.
- Jaunpur Junction (JNU) / Jaunpur City Station (JOP): These major stations are about 22–26 km away from the temple.

By Road:

Varanasi: It is roughly 36–56 km from Varanasi. UPSRTC operates frequent ordinary buses (up to 73 daily) that take about 40 minutes to reach Trilochan from Varanasi.

Jaunpur City: The temple is approximately 26–40 km from the city centre. Local transport and private cabs are readily available.

Parking & Accessibility: The temple complex provides wheelchair-accessible parking and entrances. However, during peak festivals, formal parking can be limited, often requiring roadside parking.

Auto-Rickshaws: Shared and private auto-rickshaws frequently ply between the Trilochan Mahadev Station and the temple gate.

E-Rickshaws: Available for short distances around the temple and nearby local markets

By Air:

Lal Bahadur Shastri International Airport (VNS): Located in Babatpur, Varanasi, this is the nearest airport, approximately 36–38 km from the temple.

== See also ==
- Sheetala Chaukiya Dham
- Shahi Qila, Jaunpur
- Shahi Bridge
