= Faizabad Junction railway station =

Railway station in Uttar Pradesh, India

Faizabad Junction railway station Ayodhya Cantt railway station
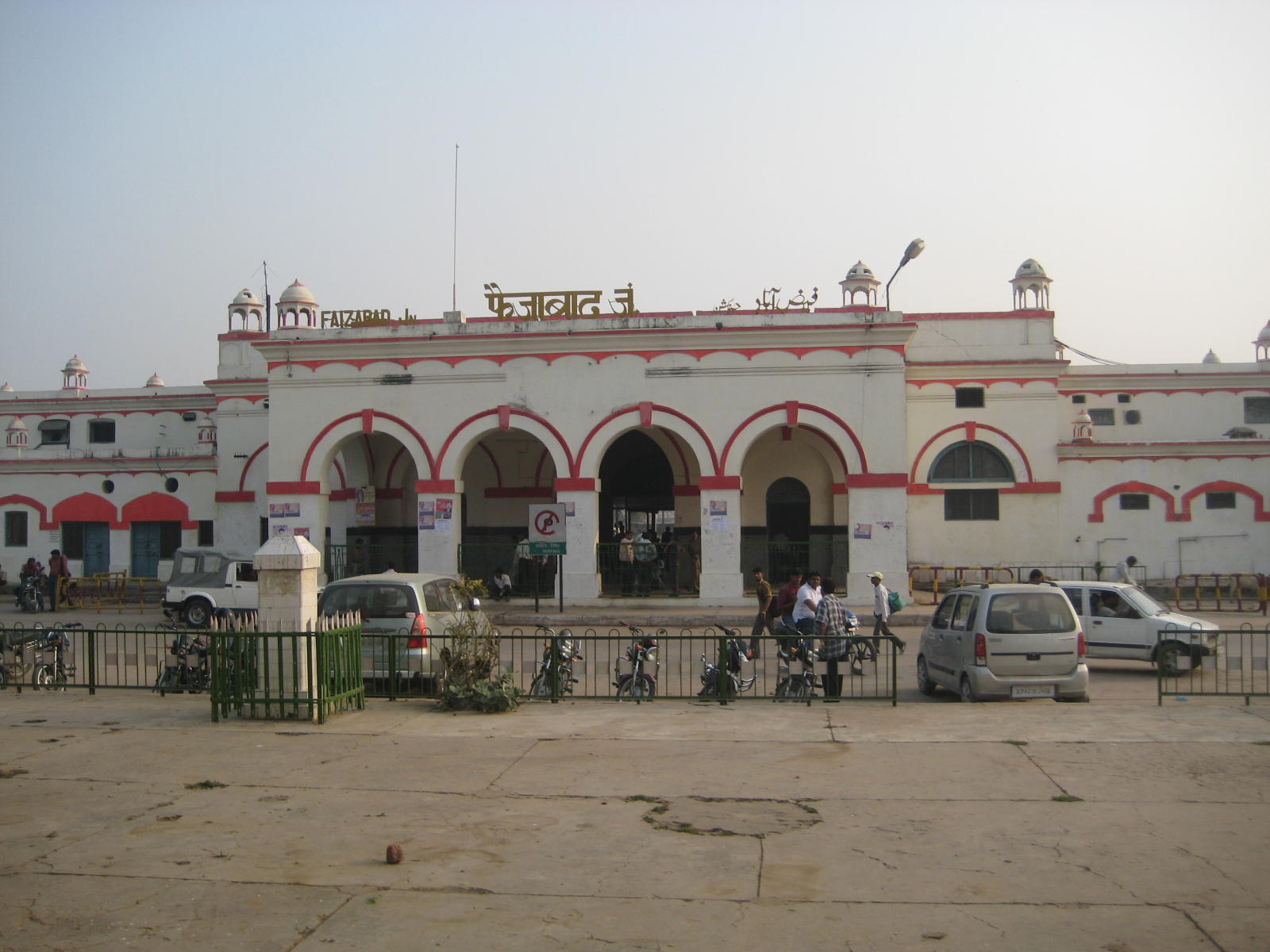
- Faizabad Junction railway station main entrance

General information
- Other names: Ayodhya Cantt railway station
- Location: Railway Colony, Ayodhya, Uttar Pradesh 224001, India; India
- Coordinates: 26°46′07″N 82°08′06″E
- Elevation: 104 m (341 ft)
- System: Indian Railways station
- Owner: Ministry of Railways (India)
- Operator: Indian Railways
- Lines: Varanasi–Lucknow line Prayagraj–Ayodhya line
- Platforms: 5
- Tracks: 10

Construction
- Structure type: At grade
- Parking: Available
- Cycle facilities: Available
- Accessible: Available

Other information
- Status: Active
- Station code: AYC
- Zone(s): Northern Railway
- Division(s): Lucknow NR
- Fare zone: Northern Railway zone

History
- Opened: 1874; 152 years ago
- Former names: Oudh and Rohilkhand Railway

Passengers
- 2017: 4,34,566
Location
- Location within Uttar Pradesh

Faizabad Junction railway station, officially known as Ayodhya Cantt railway station (station code AYC), is a railway station in Uttar Pradesh, India. It is on the Lucknow-Varanasi section and part of the Northern Railway zone. Faizabad Junction and Ayodhya Junction are the two railway junction stations in the Ayodhya district.

== History ==
The station was established in 1874. In October 2021, the chief minister of Uttar Pradesh, Yogi Adityanath, renamed the station Ayodhya Cantt railway station. On 2 November 2021 Indian Railways consented to the change of name, which also changed the station code from FD to AYC.

== Gallery ==
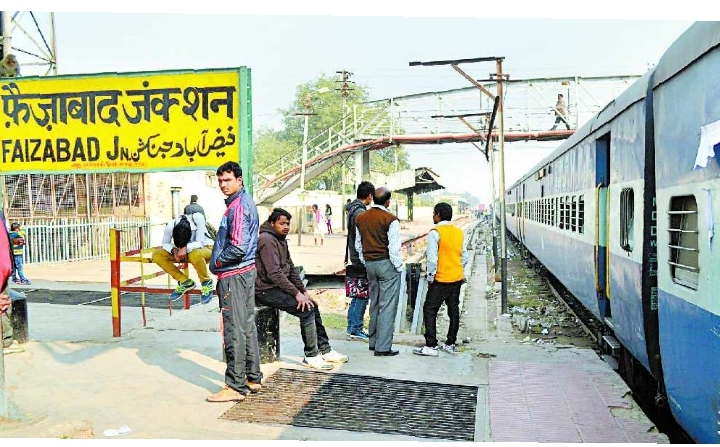
One of the platforms with a train

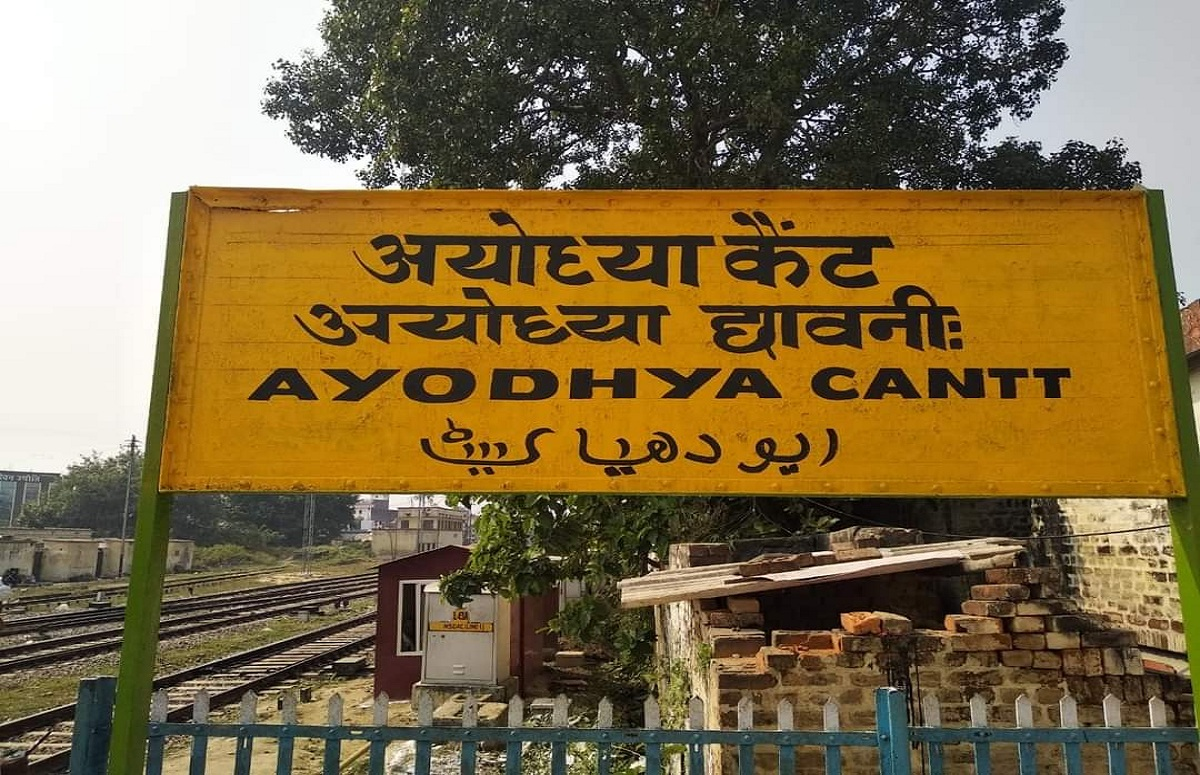
Ayodhya Cantt railway station board

== See also ==
- Lucknow Charbagh railway station
- Akbarpur railway station
- Jaunpur Junction
- Rudauli railway station
