= Haidergarh =

- Town
- Location in Uttar Pradesh, India
- Coordinates: 26°37′N 81°22′E
- Country: India
- State: Uttar Pradesh
- Division: Ayodhya
- District: Barabanki

Government
  - Type: Nagar panchayat
- Elevation: 90 m (300 ft)

Population (2011)
  - Total: 17,200

Languages
  - Official: Hindi
- Time zone: UTC+5:30 (IST)
- Postal code: 225124
- Vehicle registration: UP-41

Haidergarh is a town and a nagar panchayat in the Barabanki district in the Indian state of Uttar Pradesh.

== Demographics ==
As of the 2011 Indian census, Haidergarh had a population of 17,200. Males constitute for 53% of the population and females 47%. Haidergarh has an average literacy rate of 58%, lower than the national average of 59.5%: male literacy is at 64%, and female literacy is at 51%. In Haidergarh, 18.0% of the population is under 6 years of age.

== Location ==
The town Haidergarh is located on Lucknow-Varanasi Highway. It is situated about 55 km from Lucknow and is well-connected by rail and road networks. Haidergarh is accessible from Ayodhya (70 km), Varanasi (215 km), as well as Raibareli (60 km).
