= Trilochan Sahoo =

Indian novelist and poet

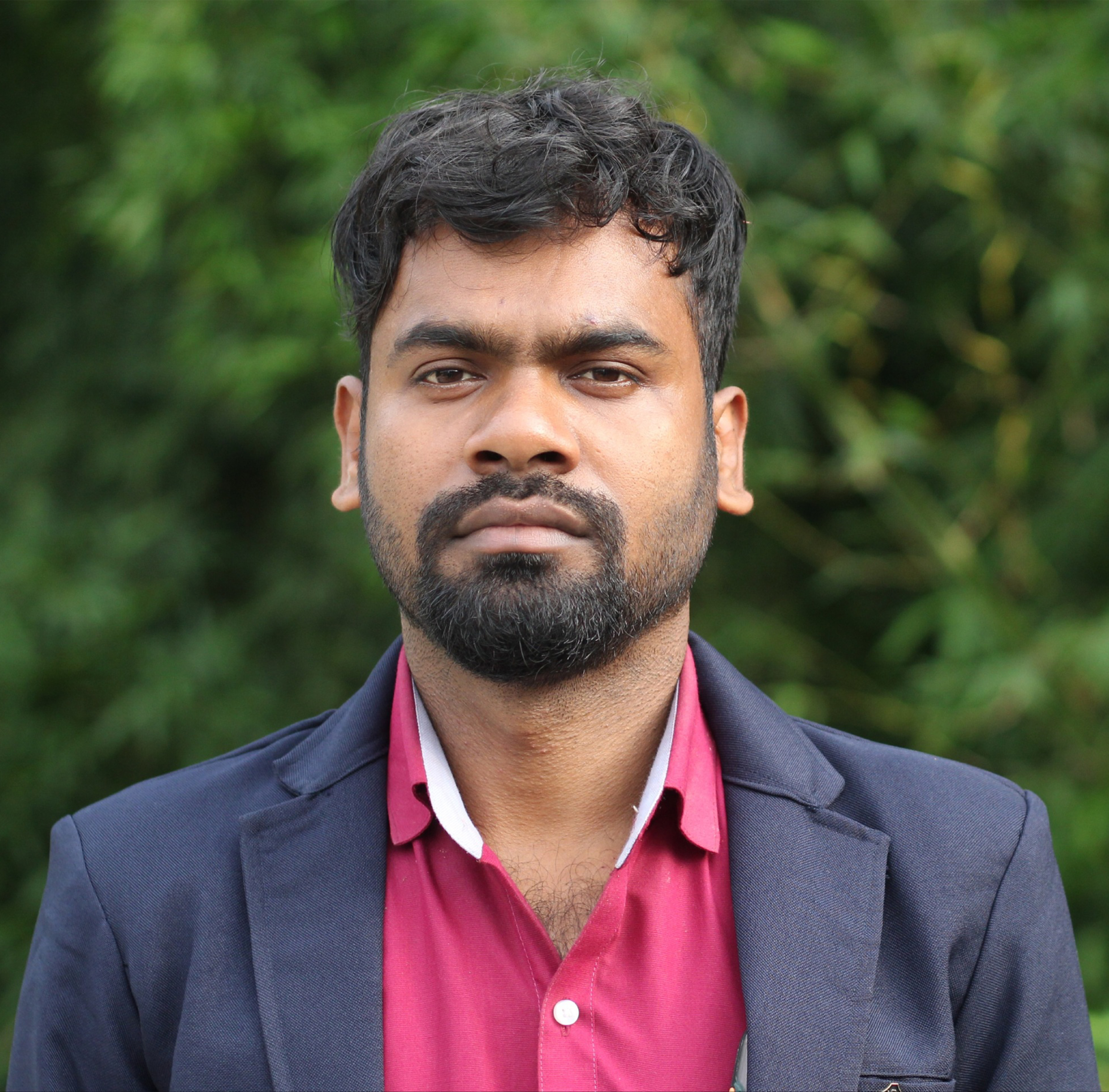
- Trilochan Sahoo
- Born: 8 August 1990 (age 36); Fakirpur, Kendujhar district
- Education: Utkal University
- Occupations: Writer, social activist

Trilochan Sahoo (born 8 August 1990) is an Odia writer, short-filmmaker, and columnist for various Odia newspapers. His first book, Sesha Swapna (Odia: ଶେଷ ସ୍ୱପ୍ନ), was published by the Sahitya Akademi in New Delhi.

== Personal life ==
Sahoo was born on 8 August 1990 to Pratima and Purna Chandra Sahoo in Fakirpur village, Anandapur subdivision, Keonjhar district. After matriculating from Fakirpur High School, he completed his graduation at Anandapur College. He later pursued a master's degree in Finance and Control and Economics from Utkal University. He is a former assistant secretary of the Athletic Society, Anandapur College, and served as the vice president of the Anandapur College Union (2008–09), Anandapur, Keonjhar, Odisha.

Sahoo is engaged in economic research and activities raising awareness about nature conservation. He initiated the "Mu Gacha Kahuchi" campaign, encouraging individuals to plant at least one tree on their birthdays to promote forest and wildlife preservation. A social activist and nature enthusiast, he has planted trees in various parts of Anandapur to restore depleted forest areas. His awareness programs aim to protect wildlife and combat forest fires in Odisha. His efforts, including events such as cycle rallies and music to promote conservation, have inspired students, social workers, and intellectuals to plant trees on their birthdays. In September 2026, he has been awarded the National Award by the National Institute of Educational Planning and Administration (NIEPA), New Delhi, for his innovations such as natural disaster awareness through school safety walls in various schools and public places and his contribution in this field.

He is a life member of the Utkal Sahitya Samaj, Cuttack; the Odisha Economics Association; the Education Research and Development Association (ERDA), Patna; the India Statistical Association, Pune; and the Agricultural Economics Research Association (AERA), New Delhi.

== Literary works ==
His first published work appeared in Pragativadi on 23 October 2006. In 2022, he represented Odisha at the Northeast Young Writers' Conference organized by the Sahitya Akademi in Darjeeling. He also represented Odisha at the International Literature Festival in Kolkata, organized by the Ministry of Culture and Ministry of Education, Government of India. Sahoo serves as the editor of Next India Journal of Social Science, an English publication. His works were also published in Odisha Review in 2016 and 2017.

He has produced around 30 documentaries and short films. His short film Nila Rakta was awarded at the 2020 Utkal Short Film Festival in Bhubaneswar. He is a member of the Anandapur Nagara Kala Sanskruti Sangha and the editor of the Odia magazine Mo Sanskruti.

=== Books ===
- Sesha Swapna (Odia: ଶେଷ ସ୍ୱପ୍ନ; poem anthology, 2023), published by Sahitya Akademi, Govt of India
- Padmasri Maguni Charana Kuanrnka Jibani (Odia biography; 2024), published by Next India Publication
- Biography of Padmashri Maguni Charana Kuanr (English; 2024), published by Next India Publication

=== Magazines ===
- Next India Journal of Social Science (English)
- Mo Sanskruti (Odia)

== Awards and honors ==
- Letter of appreciation from Editorial Group, Pragativadi (2006)
- Topper in Economics Award by Pragnya Shree Cultural Association, Anandapur (2010)
- Shahe Swara Award (2018)
- Udayaraaga Award (2019)
- Youth Utkal Award (2019)
- Utkal Short Film Festival Winner Award (2020)
- Biju Patnaik Wildlife Conservation Award (2020)
- Prakruti Bandhu Award (2021) by Forest, Environment and Climate Department, Govt. of Odisha
- Dharitri Climate Grant 2024 for initiatives such as 'I Am The Tree Speaking' (2024)
- Biju Patnaik Award for Wildlife Conservation (2024) from Forest Environment and Climate Change Department, Govt of Odisha
