= Ayodhya Cantt – Lokmanya Tilak Superfast Express =

Train in India

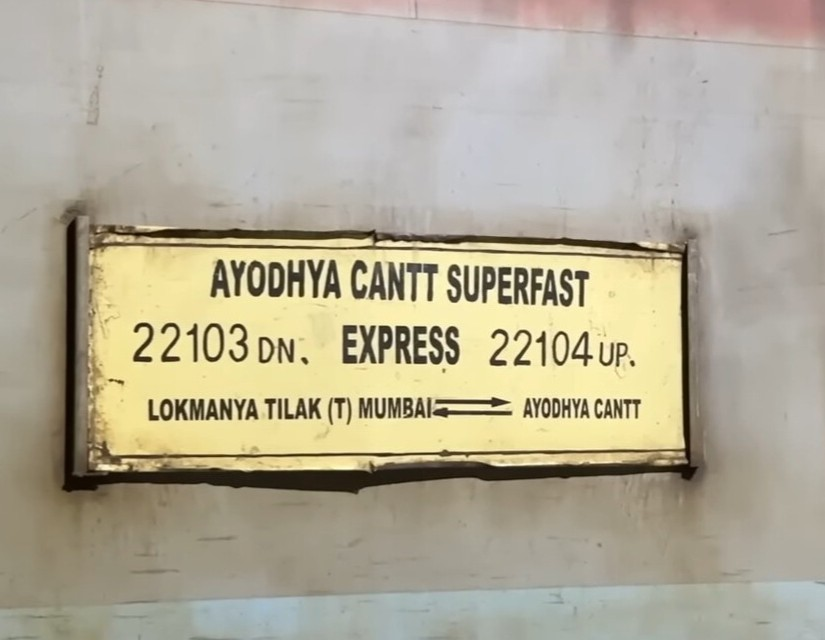

Ayodhya Superfast Express, (formerly Faizabad Superfast Express) is a train which runs weekly connecting Ayodhya Cantt railway station to Lokmanya Tilak Terminus, Mumbai. It is numbered as 22103/22104.

== Stoppage ==
Total: 15 stops.

=== From LTT to Ayodhya Cantt ===
Mumbai LTT→Kalyan Junction→Nasik Road→Jalgaon Junction→Bhusaval Junction→Itarsi Junction→Jabalpur Junction→Katni Junction→Satna Junction→Manikpur Junction→Prayagraj Junction→Janghai Junction→Mariahu→Jaunpur Junction→Shahganj Junction→Akbarpur Junction→Ayodhya Cantt

=== From Ayodhya Cantt to LTT ===
Ayodhya Cantt→Akbarpur Junction→Shahganj Junction→Jaunpur Junction→Mariahu→Janghai Junction→Prayagraj Junction→Manikpur Junction→Satna Junction→Katni Junction→Jabalpur Junction→Itarsi Junction→Bhusaval Junction→Jalgaon Junction→Nasik Road→Kalyan Junction→Mumbai LTT

== Timings ==
=== Train no. 22103 (from LTT to Ayodhya Cantt) ===
Train no.	Train name	Starting station	Destination	MON	TUE	WED	THU	FRI	SAT	SUN
22103	LTT AY Sup. Ex.	Mumbai LTT at 14:30	Ayodhya Cantt at 18:00	YES	NO	NO	NO	NO	NO	NO

=== Train no. 22104 (from Ayodhya to LTT) ===
Train no.	Train name	Starting station	Destination	MON	TUE	WED	THU	FRI	SAT	SUN
22104	AYC LTT Sup. Ex.	Ayodhya Cantt at 00:15	Mumbai LTT at 5:00	NO	YES	NO	NO	NO	NO	NO

== See also ==
- Saket Express
- Ayodhya railway station
- Jaunpur Junction
