= Jaunpur City railway station =

Railway station in Uttar Pradesh, India

Jaunpur City Railway Station
- Jaunpur City railway station

General information
- Location: Jaunpur, Uttar Pradesh, India; India
- Coordinates: 25.76°N 82.69°E
- System: Regional rail and Light rail station
- Owner: Ministry of Railways (India)
- Operator: Indian Railways
- Lines: Jaunpur City–Sultanpur-Lucknow line Jaunpur City–Varanasi line
- Platforms: 3
- Tracks: 4
- Connections: Bus stand, Taxi stand, Auto stand

Construction
- Structure type: At grade

Other information
- Status: Active
- Station code: JOP
- Zone(s): Northern Railway
- Division(s): Lucknow NR

History
- Opened: 1872; 154 years ago (Oudh & Rohilkund Railway opened line from Benaras to Lucknow); 1904; 122 years ago (Bengal And North Western Railway opened line from Aunrihar to Jaunpur Via Kerakat)

Passengers
- 10,000

Services
Location
- Location within Uttar Pradesh Location within India

Jaunpur City railway station (station code JOP) is located in Jaunpur, Uttar Pradesh, India.

This station is part of Northern Railway Zone's Lucknow NR Division and the Varanasi-Lucknow line via Jaunpur City-Sultanpur.

This station is a category (NSG 4) in Northern Railway.

== Overview ==
Jaunpur City Railway station is a medium-revenue station, serving over 10,000 passengers and over 30 Mail/ Express and almost 8 Passenger train on daily basis. It is under the administrative control of the Northern Railway zone's Lucknow NR railway division.

Jaunpur City Railway station is well connected with many important cultural cites such as Delhi, Mumbai, Kolkata, Indore, Lucknow, Varanasi, Patna, Jaipur, Ahmedabad, Jaunpur, Chandigarh, Guwahati, Jammu, Bhopal etc.

It is one of the railway stations in Jaunpur district, Uttar Pradesh, India. It is situated on the southwest side of the city about 5 km from Jaunpur Junction Railway Station. This station is under the Varanasi–Sultanpur–Lucknow line. It is the cleanest railway station in whole city compared to Jaunpur Junction, Zafarabad Junction, Shahganj Junction and Janghai Junction.

== History ==
The history of Jaunpur City railway station (JOP) is intertwined with the development of the broader railway network in the region during the British colonial era. The station was established along a major route connecting important administrative and trade centers in Uttar Pradesh.

Colonial-era origins (late 19th century)

- 1872: Varanasi-Lucknow line: The railway line passing through Jaunpur was first established when the Oudh and Rohilkhand Railway opened a broad-gauge line connecting Varanasi to Lucknow in 1872.
- Strategic importance: As part of this vital connection, the railway network facilitated the movement of goods and people between key cities and contributed to the growth of Jaunpur, which already held historical and administrative importance.
- 1904: Aunrihar-Kerakat-Jaunpur line: Later, in 1904, the Bengal and North Western Railway opened an additional line connecting Aunrihar to Jaunpur via Kerakat, further expanding the network in the region.

Post-independence Era

- Integration with Indian Railways: After India's independence in 1947, Jaunpur City station became part of the Indian Railways network, specifically the Northern Railway zone's Lucknow division.
- Modernization and upgrades: Over the decades, the station has undergone upgrades to improve passenger amenities and handle increasing traffic. In recent years, significant infrastructure improvements have been undertaken, including:
- Overbridge construction: An overbridge was built near the station on Jaunpur-Mariyahu Road to alleviate traffic congestion caused by train arrivals and departures.
- Passenger amenity upgrades: The station has received a variety of upgrades, such as improvements to the platform surface, waiting halls, and other amenities.
- NSG classification: Jaunpur City was classified as a Non-Suburban Grade 4 (NSG-4) station, indicating its moderate-to-high commercial importance within the Indian Railways network.

Current status

Today, Jaunpur City railway station remains an important transport hub for the region. It is notable for being considered cleaner than the nearby Jaunpur Junction (JNU) and for its good connectivity to major cities across India. Its history reflects the broader evolution of the Indian railway system from a colonial-era network into a modern, integrated transport lifeline.

== Key modernization projects ==
Jaunpur City railway station (JOP) is part of a significant modernization project under the Indian Railways Amrit Bharat Station Scheme. The project includes major upgrades to improve passenger facilities, infrastructure, and overall connectivity.

- Budget: A budget of ₹24.34 crore has been sanctioned specifically for the transformation of Jaunpur City railway station.
- New foundation stone: The foundation stone for the project was virtually laid by Prime Minister Narendra Modi in February 2024, along with three other stations in the district: Shri Krishna Nagar (Badlapur), Mariahu, and Badshahpur (Mungra Badshahpur).
- Master plan approach: The Amrit Bharat scheme follows a long-term master plan for phased implementation, aiming to create better and more vibrant city centers around stations.

Planned improvements at JOP

The modernization plan for Jaunpur City station includes numerous upgrades for passenger convenience and station efficiency:

- Station building: The existing station building will be upgraded with modern architecture and facilities.
- Foot overbridge: A new 12-meter wide foot overbridge will be constructed to handle increased passenger traffic.
- Platforms: Elevated platforms and improved platform surfaces are part of the plan.

Facilities for passengers:

- Waiting areas: Modernized waiting lounges will be added.
- Accessibility: Lifts, escalators, and ramps for Divyangjans (passengers with disabilities) will be installed.
- Amenities: Free Wi-Fi, clean drinking water through ATMs, and better toilet facilities will be provided.

Connectivity:

- The station will be integrated with surrounding city areas and other modes of transport to ensure smooth movement.
- Efforts will be made to increase the stoppage of long-distance trains at the modernized station.

Other features: The scheme also emphasizes sustainable solutions, aesthetic landscaping, and the promotion of local products through initiatives like "One Station One Product.

== Overview ==
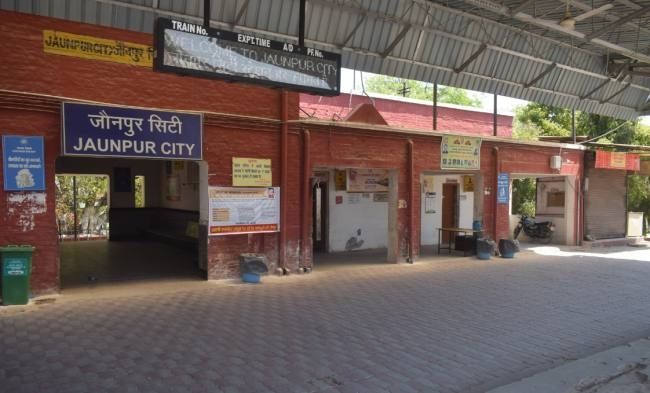
Jaunpur City Platform 1

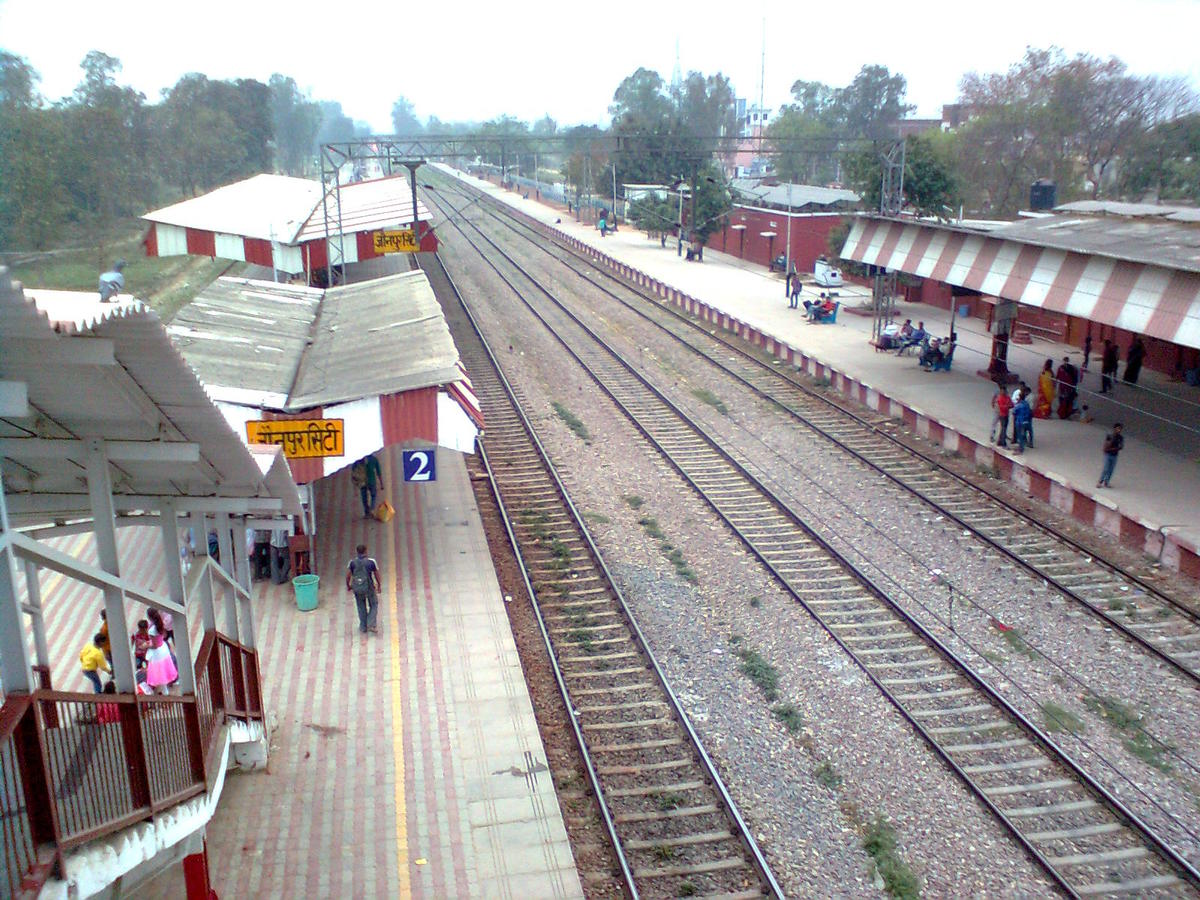
Aerial View of City Station from Overpass

There are 3 platforms, 4 Railway Tracks at this station. About 36 trains halt at this station. There are Snack Store, Waiting hall, Multi Toilets, Parking and a park as well. Recently an overbridge was built on railway crossing near city station on Jaunpur- Mariyahu Road to avoid traffic caused by arrival and departure of trains.

== See also ==
- Northern Railway Zone
- Lucknow Charbagh
- Varanasi Junction
- Sultanpur Junction
- Jaunpur Junction
