= Varanasi–Sultanpur–Lucknow line =

Railway line in Uttar Pradesh, India

Varanasi–Jaunpur City–Sultanpur–Lucknow line including Prayagraj–Ayodhya line
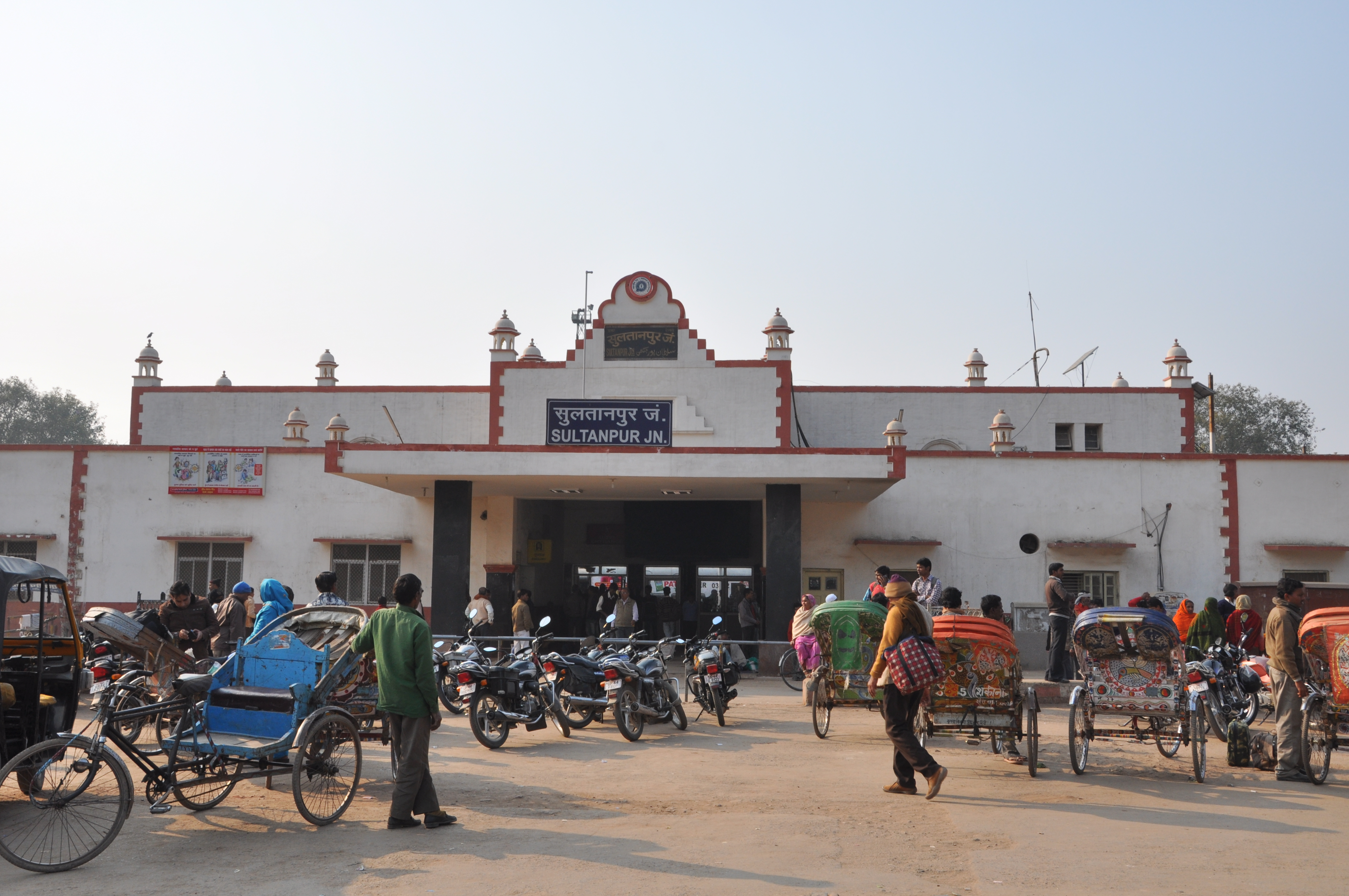
- Sultanpur Junction, an important railway station on Varanasi–Sultanpur–Lucknow line

Overview
- Status: Operational
- Owner: Indian Railways
- Locale: Gangetic Plain in Uttar Pradesh
- Termini: Varanasi; Lucknow
- Stations: Zafarabad Junction, Jaunpur City, Sultanpur Junction, Maharaja Bijli Pasi

Service
- Operator: Northern Railway for main line
- Depot: Lucknow Alambagh

History
- Opened: 1872

Technical
- Line length: 2
- Track length: Varanasi–Jaunpur City–Sultanpur–Lucknow: 282 km (175 mi); Prayagraj–Ayodhya158 km (98 mi)
- Track gauge: 5 ft 6 in (1,676 mm) broad gauge
- Electrification: 25 kV, 50 Hz AC through overhead catenary
- Operating speed: up to 110 km/h (68 mph) To be 120kmph by April 2023
- Highest elevation: Varanasi 82 m (269 ft); Lucknow 123 m (404 ft)

The Varanasi–Jaunpur City–Sultanpur–Lucknow line (also known as Varanasi–Lucknow via Sultanpur–Jaunpur main line) is a railway line connecting Varanasi and Lucknow, both in the Indian state of Uttar Pradesh. This line is under the administration of Northern Railway and Lucknow Charbagh Divisions.

== History ==
The Oudh and Rohilkhand Railway opened the 5 ft 6 in (1,676 mm) broad gauge line from Varanasi to Lucknow in 1872.

== Electrification route via Sultanpur ==
The Mughalsarai Junction–Varanasi Junction–Jaunpur City–Sultanpur Junction–Lucknow Charbagh railway station line was electrified in 2013.

== Sheds, workshops and manufacturing facilities ==
Lucknow diesel loco shed or Alambagh diesel shed is home to 160+ locomotives, including WDM-2, WDM-3A, WDM-3D, WDG-3A and WDG-4 varieties. Charbagh locomotive workshops handle periodical overhaul jobs. Allahabad has an engineering workshop.

Banaras Locomotive Works at Varanasi initially assembled ALCO kits. Subsequently, under a Transfer of Technology arrangement, the design was adopted by IR and the ALCO design WDM2 locomotive became the mainstay of Indian Railways between the mid-1960s and the late 1990s. Through indigenous efforts, the design was improved and horsepower increased from 2200 to 3600. Subsequently, with technology transfer from GM EMD, it now produces advanced diesel locomotives with high efficiency and low maintenance costs. It produces around 240 locomotives annually. Lately, DLW has started manufacturing electric locomotives also.
