= Sultanpur Junction railway station =

Railway station in Uttar Pradesh, India

Sultanpur Junction

General information
- Location: Railway Station Road, Sultanpur, Uttar Pradesh; India
- Coordinates: 26.2646°N 82.0670°E
- Elevation: 98 m (322 ft)
- System: Indian Railways
- Owner: Ministry of Railways (India)
- Operator: Indian Railways
- Lines: Varanasi-Jaunpur City-Sultanpur-Lucknow line; Ayodhya Cantt.–Sultanpur–Pratapgarh–Prayagraj line
- Platforms: 4 BG
- Tracks: 6 BG
- Connections: Taxi stand, auto stand

Construction
- Structure type: At grade
- Parking: Available
- Cycle facilities: Available
- Accessible: Disabled access

Other information
- Status: Active
- Station code: SLN
- Zone(s): Northern Railway
- Division(s): Lucknow NR
Location
- Location within India Location within Uttar Pradesh

Sultanpur Junction Railway Station (station code SLN) is located in Sultanpur, Uttar Pradesh, India.

This station is part of Northern Railway Zone's Lucknow NR Division and the Varanasi-Lucknow line and Prayagraj-Ayodhya Cantt. line via Sultanpur.

This station is an Aadarsh category (NSG 3) in Northern Railway.

Sultanpur Junction Railway station is a medium-revenue station, serving over 25,000 passengers and over 32 Mail/ Express and almost 15 Passenger train (including MEMU trains) on daily basis. It is under the administrative control of the Northern Railway zone's Lucknow NR railway division.

Sultanpur Junction Railway station is well connected with many important cultural cites such as Delhi, Mumbai, Kolkata, Kanpur, Lucknow, Varanasi, Gorakhpur, Indore, Ahmedabad, Jaunpur, Lucknow, Chandigarh, Patna, Prayagraj, Jammu etc.

This is a largest and most important railway station in Sultanpur district, Uttar Pradesh. Its code is SLN. It serves Sultanpur City. The station consists of four platforms. The main line of the Oudh and Rohilkhand Railway from Lucknow to Rae Bareli, Varanasi, Faizabad, Jaunpur, Pandit Deen Dayal Upadhyaya Nagar and Prayagraj serves the south-western portion.

== History ==
Sultanpur Junction railway station has a history stretching back to the British colonial era, with its origins tied to the Oudh and Rohilkhand Railway. The station was established as a vital link along the Varanasi–Lucknow line, which was opened in 1872.

Early development:

Colonial era: The railway station was developed by the British as part of their broader railway expansion efforts in India.

Strategic location: The Oudh and Rohilkhand Railway route passing through Sultanpur was strategically important for connecting major administrative and trade centers in Uttar Pradesh. The line facilitated movement between Lucknow, Varanasi, and Allahabad.

Town development: The establishment of the railway station played a crucial role in the growth and modernization of the town of Sultanpur. The town had already been a focal point for British cantonments since the mid-19th century.

Post-independence and modernization:

Integration with Indian Railways: Following India's independence, the station was integrated into the Indian Railways network, falling under the Northern Railway zone. Network expansion: Over the decades, the railway lines were expanded, and the station was upgraded to handle increasing passenger and freight traffic. The double electric-line track, for instance, significantly increased capacity and speed.

Ongoing upgrades: Sultanpur Junction is a beneficiary of the Amrit Bharat Station Scheme, a modernization program for railway stations across India. Recent inspections by railway officials have focused on implementing these improvements, which include:

- Widened foot-over bridges
- Construction of new station buildings
- Improved lighting and passenger amenities

Modern-day significance:

Today, the station retains its importance as a key transit hub in the Sultanpur district. It connects the city to major urban centers across the country and continues to undergo upgrades to enhance passenger experience and accommodate growing travel demands.

== Key modernization projects ==
Station building and Aesthetics:

- New station building: Construction is underway for a new, multi-story station building.
- Improved facade and landscaping: The project includes aesthetically designed facades, resurfaced platforms, and beautiful landscaping to create a more vibrant environment.

Passenger experience and access:

- Wider foot-over bridges and lifts/escalators: The project includes plans for an expanded foot-over bridge as well as the installation of lifts and escalators to improve access to platforms.
- Enhanced circulating area: The station's circulating area, including approach roads and parking facilities, is being improved for smoother traffic flow and easier access.
- Improved waiting halls and facilities: Modern waiting areas, improved toilet facilities, and free Wi-Fi are being provided.
- Better access for Divyangjans: Amenities are being specifically upgraded to provide better accessibility for people with disabilities.

Services and infrastructure:

- New booking counters and canteens: New, updated booking counters and modern canteen facilities are being built for improved passenger services.
- One Station One Product kiosks: The scheme also includes provisions for kiosks that showcase and sell local products.
- Sustainability features: Sustainable and eco-friendly solutions are being implemented as part of the overall modernization plan

== Trains ==
Some of the trains that runs from Sultanpur are:

- Ghazipur City–Shri Mata Vaishno Devi Katra Weekly Express
- Lokmanya Tilak Terminus–Sultanpur Express
- Mahamana Express
- Suhaildev Superfast Express
- Begampura Express
- Himgiri Superfast Express
- Akal Takht Express
- Indore–Patna Express
- Marudhar Express (via Sultanpur)
- Dr. Ambedkar Nagar–Kamakhya Weekly Express
- Varanasi–Sultanpur Passenger
- Howrah–Amritsar Express
- Patliputra–Chandigarh Superfast Express
- Manwar Sangam Express
- Saryu Express

== See also ==
- Jaunpur City railway station
- Varanasi Junction railway station
- Lucknow Charbagh railway station
- Varanasi-Sultanpur-Lucknow line
