= Varanasi–Lucknow line =

Railway line in Uttar Pradesh, India

Varanasi–Ayodhya –Lucknow line वाराणसी-अयोध्या-लखनऊ रेल लाइन
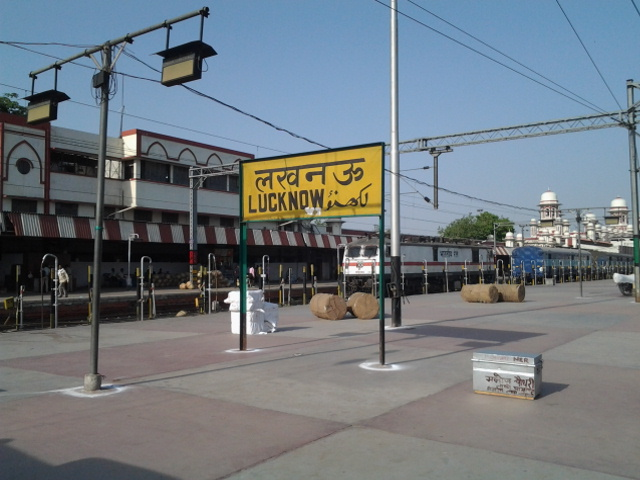
- Lucknow Charbagh, Varanasi–Ayodhya-Lucknow line

Overview
- Status: Operational
- Owner: Indian Railways
- Locale: Gangetic Plain in Uttar Pradesh
- Termini: Varanasi Jn; Lucknow Charbagh
- Stations: Jaunpur Junction, Zafarabad Junction, Ayodhya Dham Junction, Akbarpur Junction, Barabanki Junction

Service
- Operator(s): Northern Railway for main line North Central Railway partially for branch line
- Depot(s): Lucknow Junction, Ayodhya Dham Junction

History
- Opened: 1872

Technical
- Track length: via Jaunpur and Ayodhya 324 km (201 mi)
- Track gauge: 5 ft 6 in (1,676 mm) broad gauge Double broad gauge Sanctioned
- Electrification: Yes completed in March 2022
- Operating speed: up to 100 km/h
- Highest elevation: Varanasi 82 m (269 ft); Lucknow 123 m (404 ft)

The Varanasi–Ayodhya–Lucknow line (also known as Varanasi–Lucknow via Ayodhya main line) is a railway line connecting Varanasi Jn and Lucknow Charbagh, both in the Indian state of Uttar Pradesh. The main line was subsequently extended to Bareilly, Moradabad and Saharanpur and the entire line was thought of as the "main line" of Oudh and Rohilkhand Railway. An important branch line, the Prayagraj–Ayodhya line, which meets the main line almost at right angles, is included here. The main line is under the administrative jurisdiction of Northern Railway, a portion of the branch line is under the jurisdiction of North Central Railway.

== History ==
The Oudh and Rohilkhand Railway opened the 5 ft 6 in (1,676 mm) broad gauge line from Varanasi to Lucknow in 1872. The line was extended to Ayodhya as ‘Ayodhya Loop’.

The Curzon Bridge across the Ganges was opened in 1905 by the East Indian Railway Company and the 1,676 mm (5 ft 6 in)-wide 5 ft 6 in (1,676 mm) broad gauge Prayagraj–Ayodhya line was possibly opened the same year. It was operated by the Oudh and Rohilkhand Railway.

The loop line of the Oudh and Rohilkhand Railway from Benares through Ayodhya to Lucknow traverses the Jaunpur District from south to north, while the main line of the same railway crosses the south-west corner. A branch from Zafarabad to Phaphamau on the Ganges is under construction ib n 1905, which will give access to Prayagraj. Shahganj is connected with Azamgarh, and Jaunpur city with Ghazipur, by branches of the Bengal and North Western Railway.

== Passenger movement ==
Varanasi and Lucknow on the main line, and Prayagraj on a branch line are amongst the top hundred booking stations of Indian Railway.

== Sheds, workshops and manufacturing facilities ==
Lucknow diesel loco shed or Alambagh diesel shed is home to 160+ locomotives, including WDM-2, WDM-3A, WDM-3D, WDG-3A and WDG-4 varieties. Charbagh locomotive workshops handle periodical overhaul jobs. Allahabad has an engineering workshop.

Banaras Locomotive Works at Varanasi initially assembled ALCO kits. Subsequently, with technology transfer from GM EMD, it produces advanced diesel locomotives with high efficiency and low maintenance costs. It produces around 240 locomotives annually.

== Railway reorganisation ==
Around 1872, the Indian Branch Railway Company was transformed into Oudh and Rohilkhand Railway. Oudh and Rohilkhand Railway was merged with East Indian Railway Company in 1925. dia took over the Bengal and North Western Railway and merged it with the Rohilkhand and Kumaon Railway to form the Oudh and Tirhut Railway in 1943.

In 1952, Eastern Railway, Northern Railway and North Eastern Railway were formed. Eastern Railway was formed with a portion of East Indian Railway Company, east of Mughalsarai and Bengal Nagpur Railway. Northern Railway was formed with a portion of East Indian Railway Company west of Mughal Sarai, Jodhpur Railway, Bikaner Railway and Eastern Punjab Railway. North Eastern Railway was formed with Oudh and Tirhut Railway, Assam Railway and a portion of Bombay, Baroda and Central India Railway. East Central Railway was created in 1996–97. North Central Railway was formed in 2003.
