= Lucknow NR railway division =

Railway division of India

Lucknow NR railway division is one of the six railway divisions under the jurisdiction of Northern Railway zone of the Indian Railways. This railway division was formed on 23 April 1867 and its headquarters are located at Lucknow in the state of Uttar Pradesh.

Delhi railway division, Firozpur railway division, Ambala railway division and Moradabad railway division are the other railway divisions under NR Zone headquartered at New Delhi.

== List of railway stations and towns ==
The list includes the stations under the Lucknow railway division and their station category according to old nomenclature.

Category of station	No. of stations	Names of stations
A-1	3	Lucknow Junction, Rae Bareli Junction,
A	8	Akbarpur, Ayodhya Junction, Faizabad Junction, Barabanki Junction, Jaunpur Junction, Pratapgarh Junction, Sultanpur Junction, Unnao Junction
B	2	Jaunpur City, Unchahar Junction
C suburban station	-	-
D	1	Rudauli
E	-	-
F halt station	-	-
Total	-	-

Stations closed for Passengers -

The list includes the stations under the Lucknow railway division and their station category according to New nomenclature-

Category of station	No. of stations	Names of stations
NSG-1	-	-
NSG-2	2	Lucknow Jn., Varanasi Jn.,
NSG-3	8	Akbarpur Jn., Ayodhya Cantt, Faizabad Jn., Jaunpur Jn., Partapgarh Jn., Rae Bareli Jn., Shahganj Jn., Sultanpur Jn.
NSG-4	8	Amethi, Ayodhya, Barabanki Jn., Bhadohi, Janghai Jn., Jaunpur City, Prayag Jn., Unnao Jn.
NSG-5	24	Alam Nagar, Bachhrawn, Badshahpur, Daryabad, Gauriganj, Goshainganj, Jais, Kashi, Kunda, Harnamganj, Lalganj, Lalgopalganj, Lambhua, Malipur, Mariahu, Musafirkhana, Nihalgarh, Phaphamau Jn., Phulpur, Rudauli, Sri Krishna Nagar, Suriawan, Unchahar Jn., Zafarabad Jn.
NSG-6	-	Other Small Stations
HG-2	-	-
HG-3	-	-
Total	-	-
