= Lucknow Charbagh railway station =

Railway station in Uttar Pradesh, India

Lucknow Charbagh
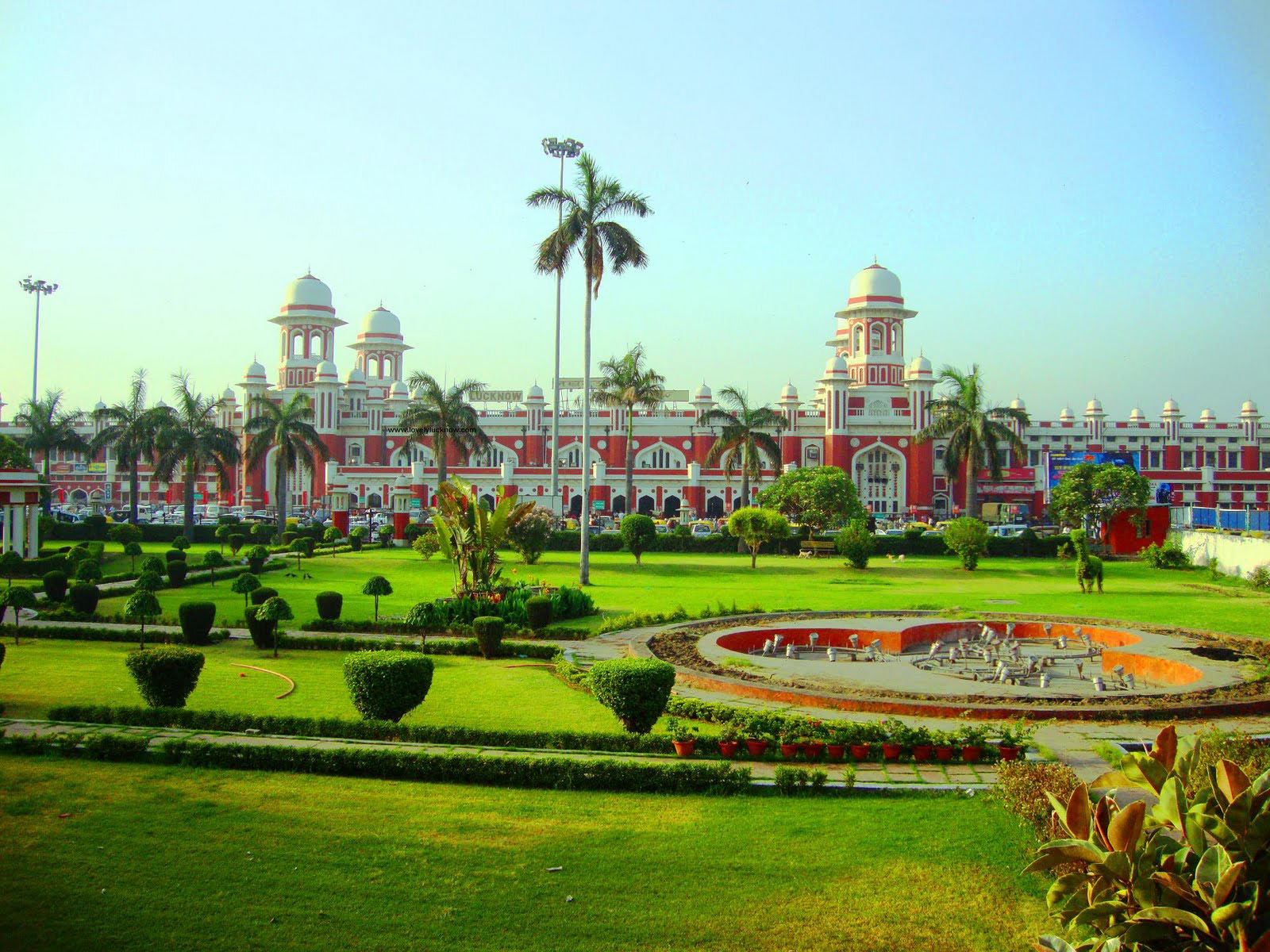
- Lucknow Charbagh railway station

General information
- Location: Charbagh, Lucknow, Uttar Pradesh, India
- Coordinates: 26°49′55″N 80°55′08″E
- Elevation: 123.500 metres (405.18 ft)
- System: Regional rail and Light rail station
- Owner: Ministry of Railways (India)
- Operator: Indian Railways
- Lines: Lucknow-Ayodhya-Jaunpur-Varanasi line; Lucknow-Rae Bareli-Varanasi line; Lucknow-Sultanpur-Jaunpur City-Varanasi line; Lucknow-Unnao-Kanpur line; Lucknow-Bareilly-Moradabad-New Delhi line
- Platforms: 9
- Tracks: 26
- Connections: Red Line Charbagh

Construction
- Structure type: Standard
- Parking: Available
- Architect: J. H. Hornimen

Other information
- Status: Active
- Station code: LKO
- Zone(s): Northern Railway zone
- Division(s): Lucknow NR railway division

History
- Opened: 21 March 1914
- Former names: Oudh and Rohilkhand Railway / East Indian Railway Company

Passengers
- 80,000

Services
Location
- Location within Uttar Pradesh Location within India

Lucknow Charbagh (officially Lucknow NR, station code: LKO) is a railway station in Lucknow, Uttar Pradesh, India. It is the largest and busiest railway station of Lucknow city.

The station is part of the Northern Railway zone's Lucknow NR Division and the Varanasi–Lucknow line.

It is also part of the Lucknow-Rae Bareli-Varanasi line, Lucknow-Sultanpur-Jaunpur City-Varanasi line, Lucknow-Kanpur Suburban Railway and Lucknow-Moradabad line.

This station is a (NSG 2) category in Northern Railway. This station is situated in southern central part of Lucknow and adjacent to Lucknow Junction.

Nearby stations include Lucknow Junction (LJN) and Aishbagh (ASH).

== Overview ==
Lucknow Charbagh is a high-revenue station, serving over 80,000 passengers and over 180 Mail/Express and 250-300 Passenger trains on a daily basis. It is under the administrative control of the Northern Railway zone's Lucknow NR railway division.It is the Headquarter of Lucknow NR railway division.

Lucknow Charbagh is well connected with many important cultural cities such as New Delhi, Kanpur, Prayagraj, Varanasi, Ayodhya, Jaunpur, Agra, Jaipur, Bareilly, Moradabad, Dehradun, Haridwar, Amritsar, Ludhiana, Chandigarh, Jammu, Meerut, Mathura, Bhopal, Indore, Jabalpur, Gwalior, Raipur, Durg, Ujjain, Bilaspur, Ahmedabad, Mumbai, Pune, Surat, Vadodara, Nashik, Jodhpur, Kolkata, Patna, Guwahati, Bhubaneswar, Puri, Gaya, Jamshedpur, Dhanbad, Asansol, Chennai, Bangalore, Hyderabad, Kochi, Coimbatore, and Thiruvananthapuram.

== History ==
The history of the Lucknow Charbagh railway station is intertwined with the evolution of Indian railways during the British Raj. The iconic building itself is an Indo-Saracenic architectural masterpiece that was completed in 1923, and it holds a significant place in both the city's heritage and India's independence movement.

In 19th century, Lucknow was the second most important station in the North after Delhi. It was the Headquarters of the Oudh and Rohilkhand Railway (O&RR) whose first line from Lucknow to Kanpur was built in April 1867.

Now known as Lucknow Charbagh station, it is part of Northern Railway. It is neighbored by another major station, Lucknow Junction under the North-Eastern Railway within the same premises with a different terminal building.

The foundation stone for the station's main building was laid in March 1914 by Bishop George Herbert. It was designed by J.H. Horniman with assistance from consulting engineer Chaubey Mukta Prasad. The structure features a blend of Mughal, Awadhi, and Rajput architectural styles, giving it a palatial look. The building was completed in 1923 and officially inaugurated for public use in 1926.

Today, the Charbagh complex consists of two adjacent stations: Lucknow Charbagh (LKO), under the Northern Railway zone, and the distinct Lucknow Junction (LJN), which falls under the North Eastern Railway zone.

== Key modernization projects ==
Lucknow Charbagh railway station is currently undergoing a comprehensive ₹420-crore modernization project under the Amrit Bharat Station Scheme, aiming to transform it into a world-class transit hub while retaining its heritage look. The project includes the integrated redevelopment of both the LKO (Northern Railway) and LJN (North Eastern Railway) stations, with an anticipated completion around the end of 2026.

Improvements include:

- Construction of a vast, modern elevated concourse (120m x 115m) to seamlessly connect the main and second entry points and improve passenger movement.
- The number of platforms in the Northern Railway section is being expanded from 9 to 11 to handle more trains and ease congestion.
- Improved integration with the existing Charbagh metro station and plans for the upcoming Phase 2 metro line (Charbagh-Vasant Kunj) to link the station with other parts of the city.

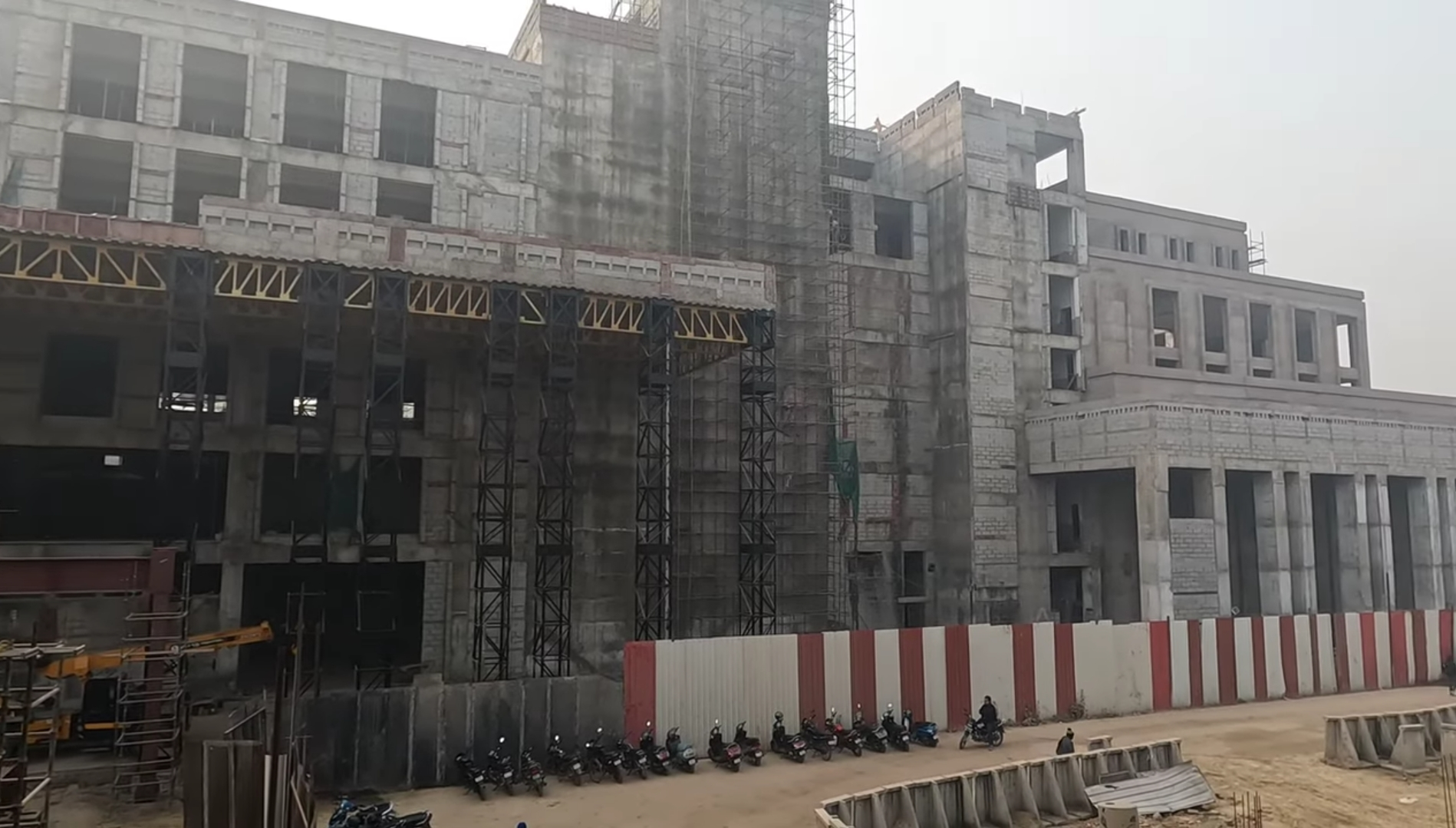
The new building of Charbagh railway station is being constructed by R.L.D.A. (Rail Land Development Authority)

As of now the entire structure of the new and modern railway station is already constructed with electrical and facade work is underway. The construction new maintenance shed near Lucknow junction is also completed. The piling work for pillar erection of mega concourse is underway in various parts of the station.

== Infrastructure ==
The Station was built at a price of ₹ 70 lakhs, which now values as US$ 2 million Dollars or ₹ 14 crores in 2021; Lucknow Charbagh was designed by J. H. Horniman. The foundation of the railway station was placed in March 1914. The building was completed in 1923. A major role in its design and planning was carried out by Chaubey Mukta Prasad, a consulting engineer for Ms Lanebrown and Hulett. It has a large garden in front of the building. It incorporates the mix of Rajput, Awadhi and Mughal architecture and has a palatial appearance. Architecturally, it is considered one of the most beautiful railway stations in India. The Government Railway Police station at Lucknow Charbagh holds an ISO 9001 certificate.

== Diesel loco shed, Alambagh ==
Serial No.	Locomotive Class	Horsepower	Quantity
1.	WAP-4	5350	2
2.	WAG-7	5350	60
3.	WAG-5	3850	19
4.	WAP-1	3850	15
5.	WDG-3A	3100	25
6.	WDM-3A	3100	16
7.	WDM-3D	3300	72
8.	WDG-4/4D	4000/4500	58
9.	WDP-4/4B/4D	4000/4500	28
Total Locomotives Active as of July 2025			295

== Platforms ==
The station has 9 platforms. Out of which, 2 platforms are Terminals, located towards Dilkusha and 7 are Through Platforms. 2 more terminal platforms are under construction which are towards Alam Nagar.

The adjacent Lucknow NER Jn. has 6 Terminal Platforms. Although managed by 2 different divisions, the entire complex houses 15 platforms.

== Gallery ==
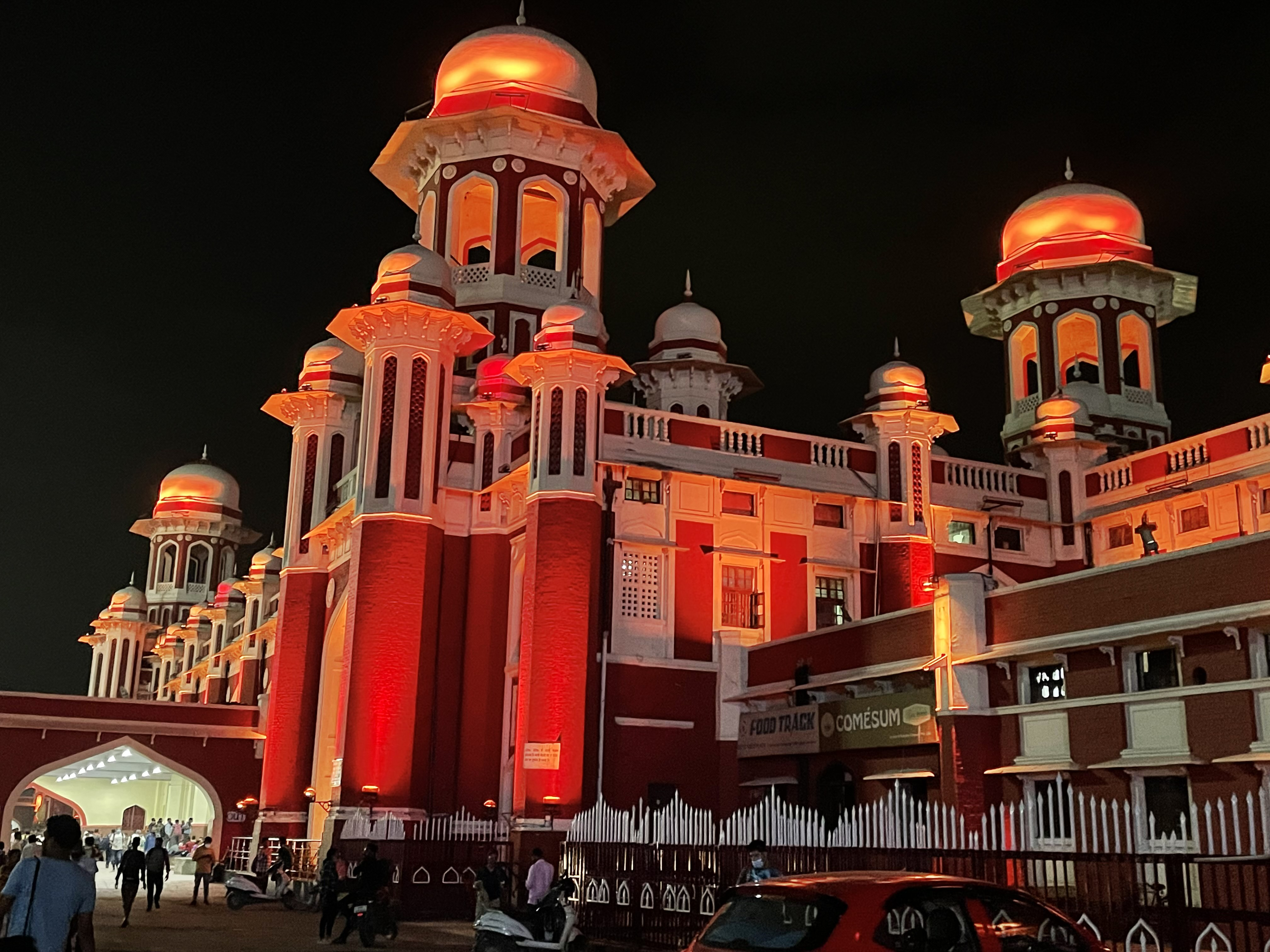
Lucknow Charbagh Night view

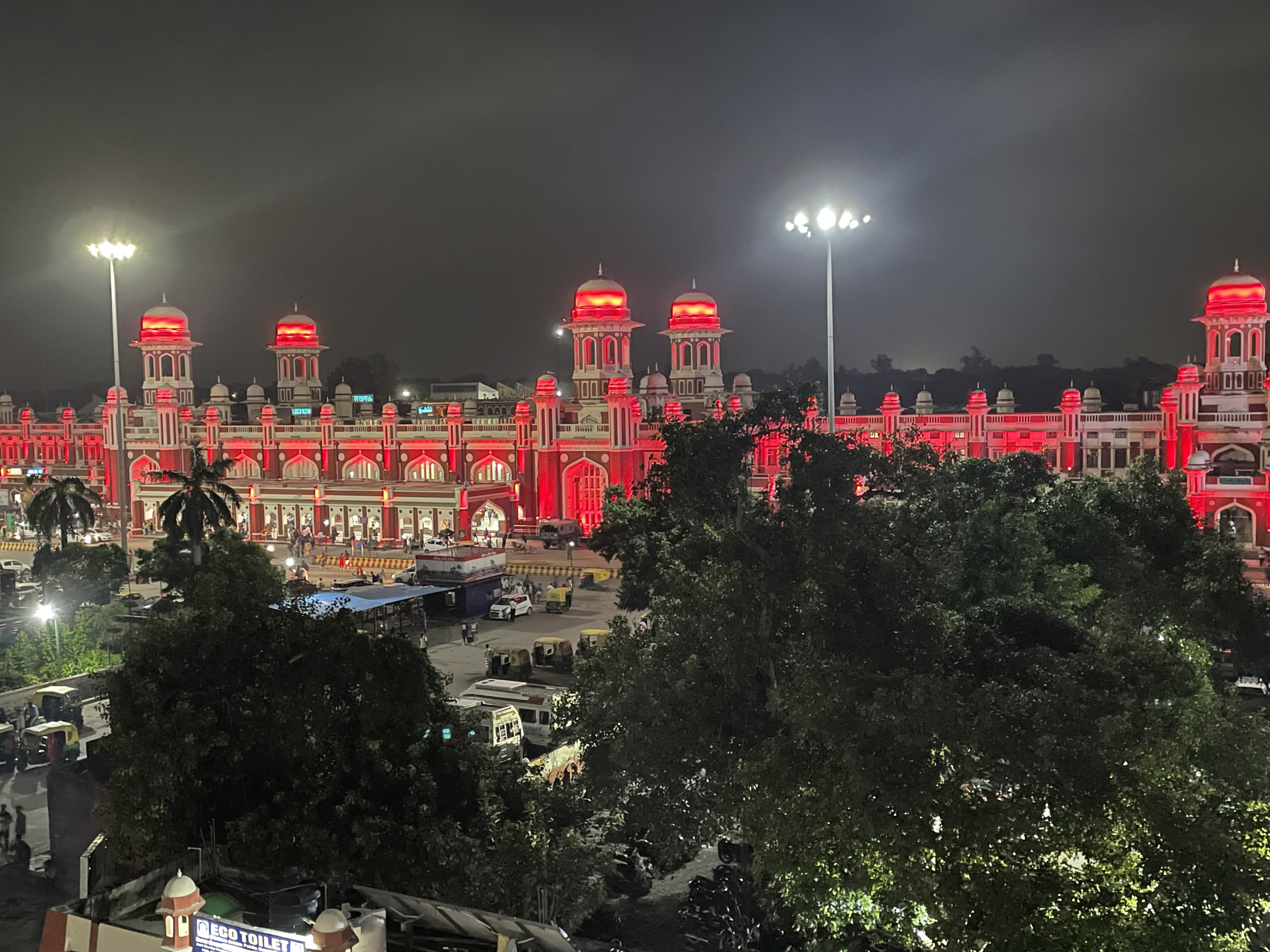
Lucknow Charbagh Railway Station from outside.

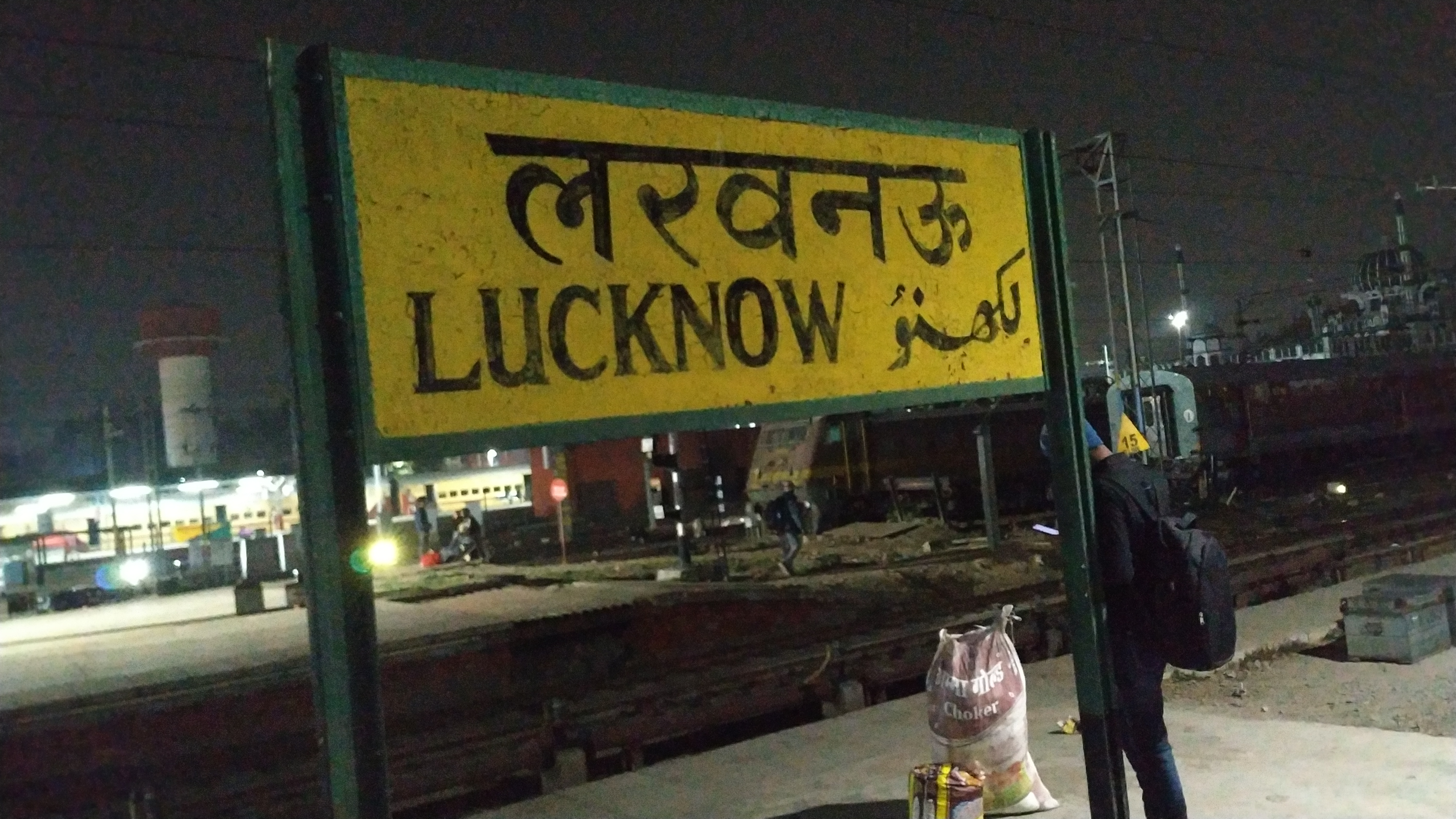
Station board view of Lucknow Charbagh railway station.

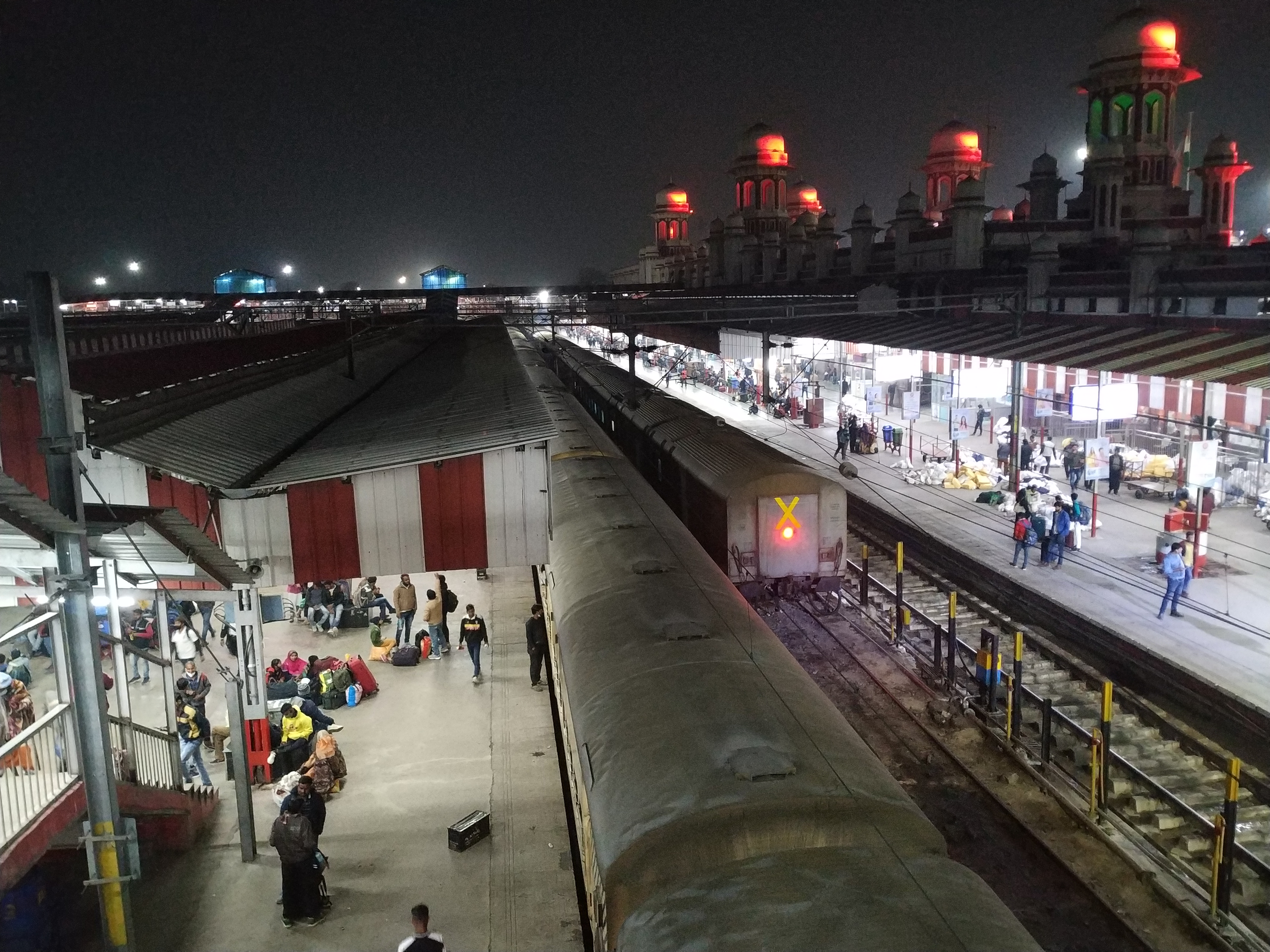
FOB view at LKO

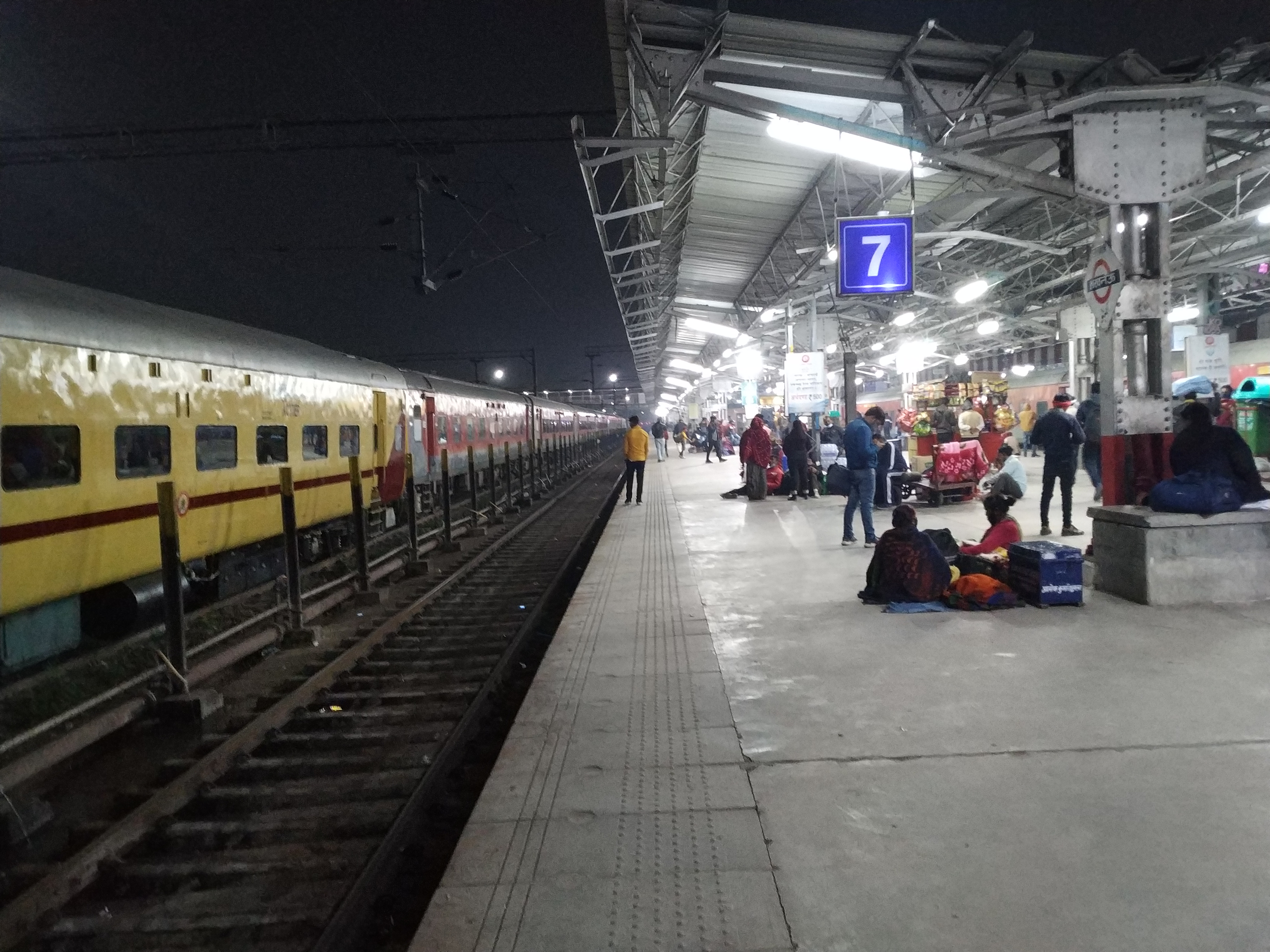
View of Platform 7 at LKO.

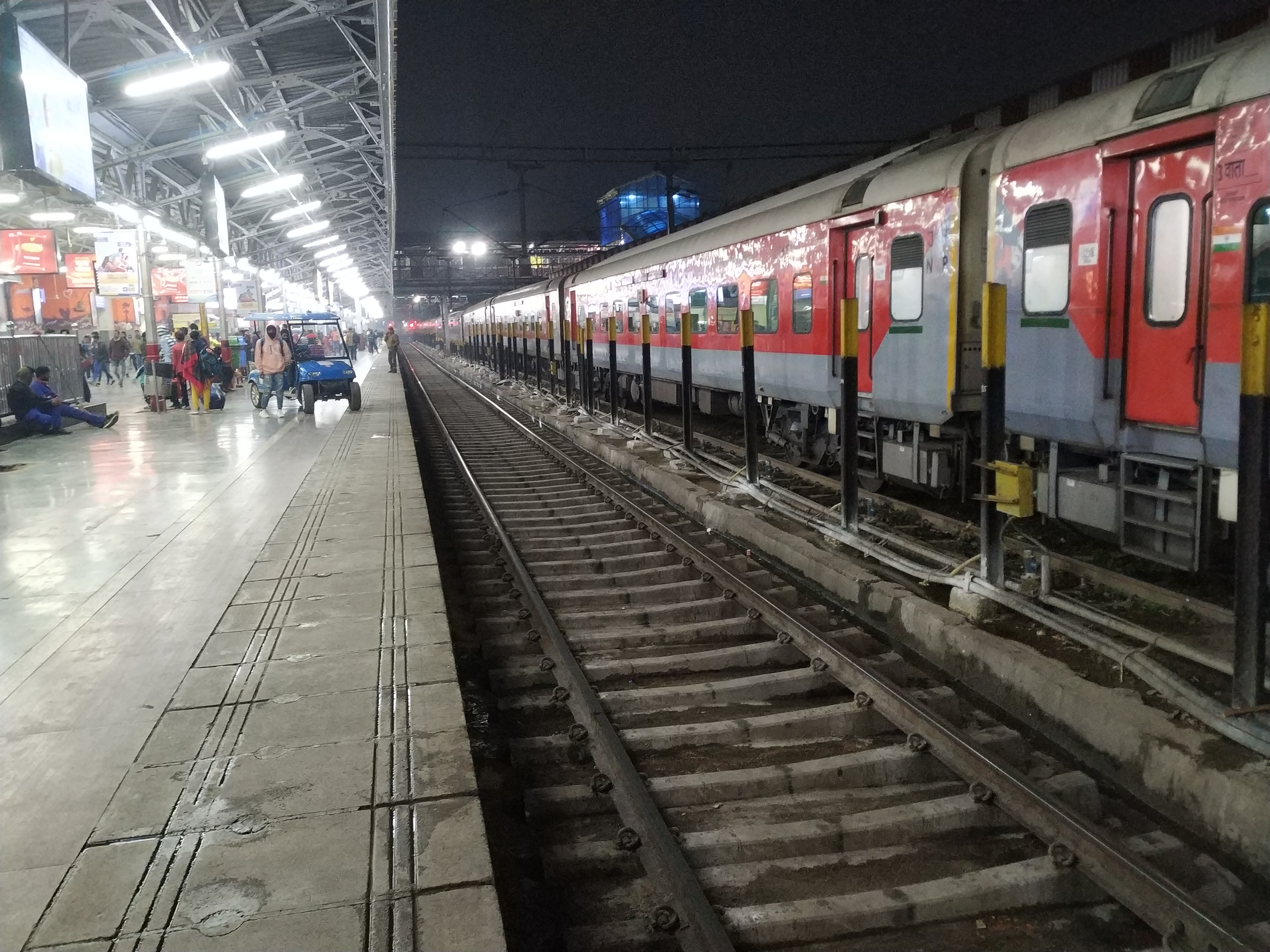
LKO Platform 1.

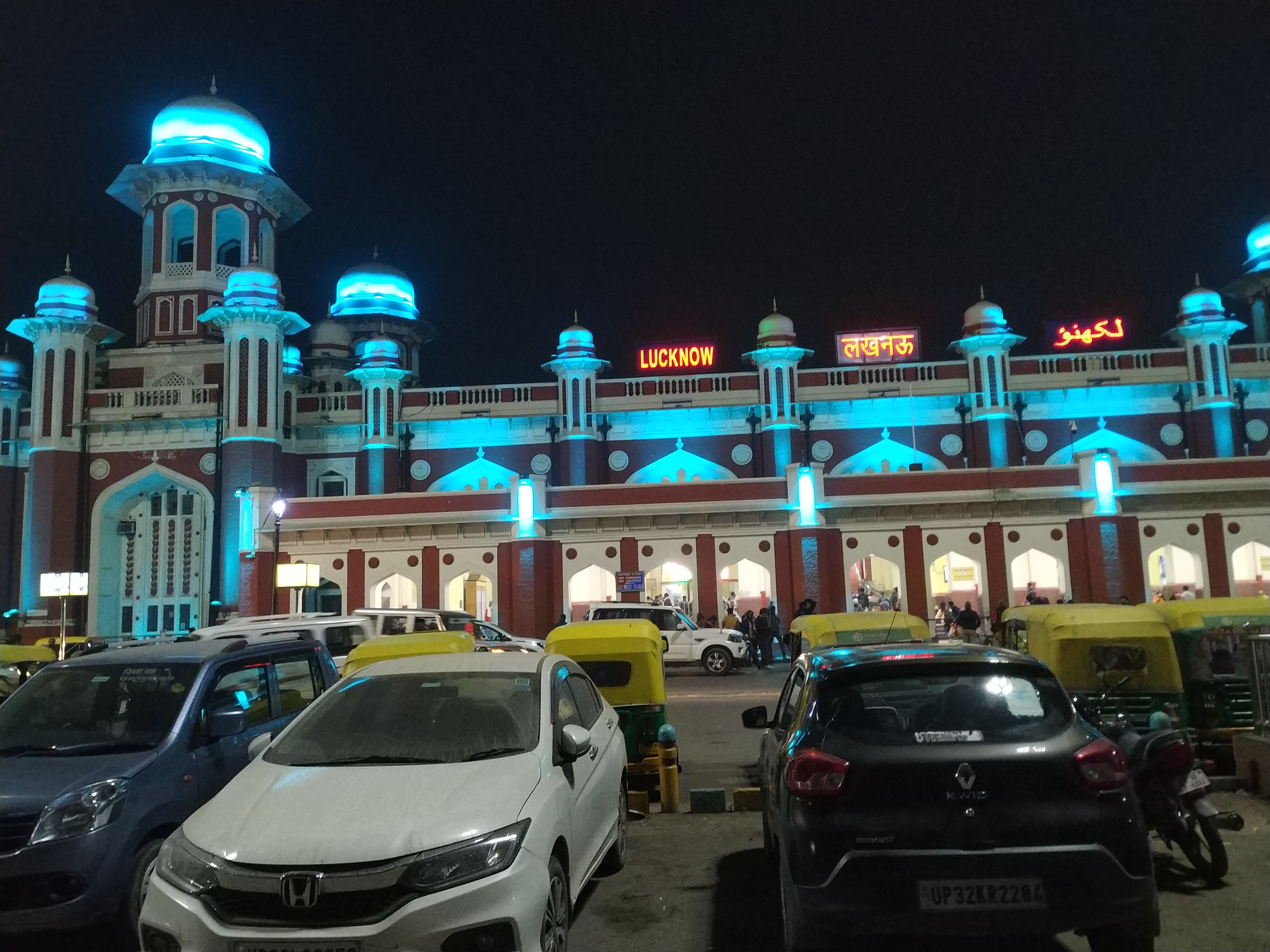
Lucknow Charbagh Railway Station.
