= Guru Gorakhnath Dham railway station =

Railway station in Uttar Pradesh, India

Guru Gorakhnath Dham railway station Jais railway station

General information
- Location: Jais, Amethi district, Uttar Pradesh; India
- Coordinates: 26.2621°N 81.5195°E
- Elevation: 101 m (331 ft)
- System: Indian Railways station
- Owner: Indian Railways
- Operator: Northern Railway
- Line: Lucknow–Rae Bareli–Varanasi line
- Platforms: 2
- Tracks: 4 (Construction – Doubling of electric BG)
- Connections: Taxi stand, auto stand

Construction
- Structure type: Standard (on-ground station)
- Parking: Available
- Cycle facilities: Available
- Accessible: Disabled access

Other information
- Status: Construction – Electric-line doubling
- Station code: GUGD (formerly JAIS)
- Zone(s): Northern Railway
- Division(s): Lucknow NR

History
- Electrified: Work-in-progress
Location

Guru Gorakhnath Dham railway station, formerly known as Jais railway station (station code: GUGD, old code JAIS) is a railway station in Amethi district, Uttar Pradesh. It serves Jais town. The station consists of two platforms and is being electrified the rail line. The platforms are sheltered and has facilities including chair seating, drinking water, parking, and toilet. This station is near by Rajiv Gandhi Institute of Petroleum Technology (RGIPT), a institute of national importance in Amethi district.

In a letter to Smriti Irani, Cabinet Minister and current Member of Parliament from Amethi (Lok Sabha constituency), Railway minister Shree Piyush Goyal ordered to stop Bhopal – Pratapgarh Express at Jais railway station The Uttar Pradesh government changed the name of the station from Jais to Guru Gorakhnath Dham on 27 August 2024.

== Trains ==
Some of the trains that runs from JAIS are :

- Kashi Vishwanath Express
- Bhopal–Pratapgarh Express (via Lucknow)
- Howrah–Amritsar Express
- Neelachal Express
- Padmavat Express
- Varanasi–Dehradun Express
- Prayag–Bareilly Express
- Varanasi–Lucknow Intercity Express

== See also ==
- Gauriganj railway station
- Amethi railway station
- Rae Bareli Junction railway station
- Pratapgarh Junction railway station
