= Gauriganj railway station =

Railway station in Uttar Pradesh, India

General information
- Location: Gauriganj Railway Station, Gauriganj, Amethi, Uttar Pradesh; India
- Coordinates: 26.204°N 81.686°E
- Elevation: 104 m (341 ft)
- System: Indian Railways station
- Owner: Indian Railways
- Operator: Northern Railway
- Line: Lucknow–Rae Bareli–Varanasi line
- Platforms: 2
- Tracks: 6
- Connections: Taxi stand, auto stand

Construction
- Structure type: Standard (on-ground station)
- Parking: Available
- Cycle facilities: Available
- Accessible: Disabled access

Other information
- Status: Double electric line
- Station code: GNG
- Zone(s): Northern Railway
- Division(s): Lucknow NR

History
- Electrified: Yes (Since 2018)

Passengers
- 15000

Services
Waiting halls, toilets, drinking water etc.
Location

Gauriganj railway station is a railway station in Amethi district, Uttar Pradesh. Its code is GNG. It serves Amethi District headquarter Gauriganj town. The station consists of two platforms, newly constructed station and being electrified the rail line. The platforms are partially sheltered and has facilities including wifi, chair seating, drinking water, parking, and a toilet.

== Trains ==
Some of the trains that runs from Gauriganj are :

- Howrah–Amritsar Express
- Neelachal Express
- Padmavat Express
- Varanasi–Dehradun Express
- Marudhar Express (via Pratapgarh)
- Malda Town–New Delhi Express
- Jaunpur–Rae Bareli Express
- Prayag–Bareilly Express
- Varanasi–Lucknow Intercity Express

== See also ==
- Amethi railway station
- Rae Bareli Junction railway station
- Pratapgarh Junction railway station
