= Jaunpur–Rae Bareli Express =

Overview
- Service type: Express
- Current operator: Northern Railway zone

Route
- Termini: Jaunpur Junction (JNU); Rae Bareli Junction (RBL)
- Stops: 9
- Distance travelled: 202 km (126 mi)
- Average journey time: 5h 40m
- Service frequency: Daily (Note: Runs per day in a week for every direction.)
- Train number: 14201/14202

On-board services
- Classes: AC 2 tier, AC 3 tier, Sleeper class, General Unreserved
- Seating arrangements: No
- Sleeping arrangements: Yes
- Catering facilities: On-board catering E-catering
- Observation facilities: ICF coach
- Entertainment facilities: No
- Baggage facilities: No
- Other facilities: Below the seats

Technical
- Rolling stock: 2
- Track gauge: 1,676 mm (5 ft 6 in)
- Operating speed: 36 km/h (22 mph), including halts

The Jaunpur–Rae Bareli Express is an Express train belonging to Northern Railway zone that runs between Jaunpur Junction and Rae Bareli Junction in India. It is currently being operated with 14201/14202 train numbers on a daily basis.

== Service ==
The 14201/Jaunpur–Rae Bareli Express has an average speed of 36 km/h and covers 202 km in 5h 40m. The 14202/Rai Bareli–Jaunpur Express has an average speed of 38 km/h and covers 202 km in 5h 20m.

== Route and halts ==
The important halts of the train are:

- Jaunpur Junction
- Zafarabad Junction
- Mariahu
- Janghai Junction
- Badshahpur
- Dandupur
- Pratapgarh Junction
- Amethi
- Gauriganj
- Jais
- Rae Bareli Junction

== Coach composition ==
The train has standard ICF rakes with max speed of 110 kmph. The train consists of 12 coaches :

- 10 General Unreserved
- 2 Seating cum Luggage Rake

== Traction ==
Both trains are hauled by a Lucknow Loco Shed-based WDP-4D diesel locomotive from Rae Bareli to Jaunpur and vice versa.

== See also ==
- Rae Bareli Junction railway station
- Jaunpur Junction railway station
