= Badshahpur railway station =

Railway Station in Uttar Pradesh, India

Badshahpur Railway Station
- Badshahpur

General information
- Location: SH 7, Mungra Badshahpur, Jaunpur, Uttar Pradesh; India
- Coordinates: 25.652709°N 82.191161°E
- Elevation: 98 metres (322 ft)
- Owner: Ministry of Railways (India)
- Operator: Indian Railways
- Line: Varanasi–Rae Bareli–Lucknow line
- Platforms: 2
- Tracks: 3
- Connections: Bus stand, Auto stand

Construction
- Structure type: At grade
- Parking: Yes
- Cycle facilities: Yes
- Accessible: Disabled access

Other information
- Status: Active
- Station code: BSE
- Zone(s): Northern Railway zone
- Division(s): Lucknow NR

History
- Opened: April 4, 1898; 128 years ago

Passengers
- 2500

Services
Location
- Location within India Location within Uttar Pradesh

Badshahpur railway station (station code BSE) is a railway station in Jaunpur, Uttar Pradesh, India. It is a passenger rail station serving the town of Mungra Badshahpur and nearby villages.

The station is part of the Northern Railway zone's Lucknow NR Division and the Varanasi–Rae Bareli–Lucknow line.

This station is a category (NSG 5) in Northern Railway. This station is situated in south-west Jaunpur.

Nearby stations include Janghai Junction (JNH) and Pratapgarh Junction (MBDP).

== Operations ==
Badshahpur railway station is a small station, serving over 2,500 passengers, 10 mail / express trains, and 4 passenger trains on a daily basis. It is under the administrative control of the Northern Railway zone's Lucknow NR railway division.

The station has 2 platforms and is 54 km away from Prayagraj Airport, previously known as Allahabad Bamrauli Airport.

== See also ==
- Lucknow Charbagh
- Raebareli Junction
- Jaunpur Junction
- Pratapgarh Junction
- Varanasi Junction
