= Meerganj, Jaunpur =

Meerganj
- Village
- Location within Uttar Pradesh Location within India
- Coordinates: 25.3410°N 82.2332°E
- Country: India
- State: Uttar Pradesh
- District: Jaunpur
- Elevation: 93.00 m (305.12 ft)

Population
  - Total: 1,047

Languages शुद्ध हिंदी एवं अवधी
  - Official: Hindi, Urdu
- Time zone: UTC+5:30 (IST)
- PIN: 222165
- Vehicle registration: UP62

Meerganj is a village in Jaunpur district in the Indian state of Uttar Pradesh. Meerganj is located 6 km kilometres north-east of Janghai Junction railway station and 1 km west of Jarauna railway station.

== Population ==
- The population in Meerganj was 1,074 as of the 2011 census.
- Number of houses, 136
- Population, 1,074 of which 541 were male and 533 are female
- Children (0-6), 155 of which were 83 male and 72 were female
- Schedule Caste, 197 of which 107 were male and 90 were female
- Schedule Tribe, 0
- Literacy, 78% for all; 88% for males and 69% for females
- Total workers, 318, of which 219 were male and 99 were female
- Main workers, 218
- Marginal workers, 100 of which 51 were male and 49 were female

== Educational institutes ==
=== Schools ===
- Primary School Meerganj
- Aasharam Shishu Shikaha Niketan
- Sterling School Meerganj
- ARJHS Meerganj
- Primary School Sarai dewa
- Primary School Bhatahar
- Primary School Medpur Bankat
- Primary School Meerpur

National islamia meerganj

=== College ===
- Sarvodya Vidhyapeeth Inter College
- Sarvodya Vidhyapeeth Degree College
- Ramdev Degree College
- Sampurnanad Sanskrit mahavidyalay Darapur

coaching center •NCP coaching center •Pragati coaching center •Taj coaching center

== Hospitals ==
- JR K Hospital

== Transportation ==
=== Rail ===
Meerganj is connected to Indian Railways. It has three nearby railway stations: Jarauna railway station, Sarai Kansrai railway station and Janghai Junction.

=== Road ===
Meerganj is connected to Jaunpur, Sant Ravidas Nagar, Varanasi, Allahabad and other cities like Azamgarh, Mirzapur, Janghai, Sultanpur, Ghazipur etc.

=== Airport ===
Lal Bahadur Shastri Airport (formerly Varanasi Airport) (IATA: VNS, ICAO: VIBN) is a public airport located at Babatpur 18 km (11 mi) northwest of Varanasi, and about 70 km from Meerganj. It located at Jaunpur-Varanasi highway.
