= Ekatmata Express =

Train in India

Overview
- Service type: Express
- Locale: Bihar & Uttar Pradesh
- First service: 11 February 2016; 9 years ago
- Current operator(s): Northern Railway

Route
- Termini: Gaya Junction (GAYA); Lucknow Charbagh (LKO)
- Stops: 12
- Distance travelled: 524 km (326 mi)
- Average journey time: 10 hours 40 minutes
- Service frequency: Weekly
- Train number(s): 14259 / 14260

On-board services
- Class(es): AC 3 Tier, Sleeper class, General Unreserved
- Seating arrangements: No
- Sleeping arrangements: Yes
- Auto-rack arrangements: Overhead racks
- Catering facilities: E-catering only
- Observation facilities: Large windows
- Baggage facilities: No
- Other facilities: Below the seats

Technical
- Rolling stock: ICF coach
- Track gauge: 1,676 mm (5 ft 6 in)
- Operating speed: 49 km/h (30 mph) average including halts.

The 14259/14260 Ekatmata Express is an intercity train of the Indian Railways connecting Gaya Junction in Bihar and Lucknow Charbagh of Uttar Pradesh. It is currently being operated with 14259/14260 train numbers on a weekly basis.

== Service ==
The 14259/Ekatmata Express has an average speed of 48 km/h and covers 319 km in 6 hrs 40 mins. 14260/Ekatmata Express has an average speed of 46 km/h and covers 319 km in 7 hrs.

== Route and halts ==
- Gaya Junction
- Sasaram
- Pandit Deen Dayal Upadhyaya Junction
- Varanasi Junction
- Bhadohi
- Janghai Junction
- Pratapgarh Junction
- Amethi
- Rae Bareli Junction
- Lucknow Charbagh

== Coach composition ==
The train consists of 13 coaches :

- 1 AC II Tier
- 1 AC III Tier
- 6 Sleeper coaches
- 6 General
- 2 Second-class Luggage/parcel van

== Traction ==
Both trains are hauled by a DDU Loco Shed-based WAP-4 electric locomotive on its entire journey.
