= Prayag–Jaunpur Passenger =

Passenger train in India

Overview
- Service type: Express
- Current operator: Northern Railway zone

Route
- Termini: Prayag Junction (PRG); Jaunpur Junction (JNU)
- Stops: 16
- Distance travelled: 107 km (66 mi)
- Average journey time: 3h 45m
- Service frequency: Daily (Note: Runs seven days in a week for every direction.)
- Train number: 54375/54376

On-board services
- Classes: AC 2 tier, AC 3 tier, Sleeper class, General Unreserved
- Seating arrangements: No
- Sleeping arrangements: Yes
- Catering facilities: On-board catering E-catering
- Observation facilities: ICF coach
- Entertainment facilities: No
- Baggage facilities: No
- Other facilities: Below the seats

Technical
- Rolling stock: 2
- Track gauge: 1,676 mm (5 ft 6 in)
- Operating speed: 29 km/h (18 mph), including halts

The Prayag–Jaunpur Passenger is an express train belonging to Northern Railway zone that runs between Prayag Junction (in Allahabad) and Jaunpur Junction (in Jaunpur, Uttar Pradesh) in India. It is currently being operated with 54375/54376 train numbers on a daily basis.

== Service ==
The 54375/Prayag–Jaunpur Passenger has an average speed of 29 km/h and covers 107 km in 3h 45m. The 54376/Jaunpur–Prayag Passenger has an average speed of 27 km/h and covers 107 km in 3h 55m.

== Route and halts ==
The important halts of the train are:

- Prayag Junction
- Phulpur
- Janghai Junction
- Jarauna
- Barsathi
- Mariahu
- Shudnipur
- Salkhapur
- Zafarabad Junction
- Jaunpur Junction

== Coach composition ==
The train has standard ICF rakes with max speed of 110 kmph. The train consists of 16 coaches:

- 8 General Unreserved
- 2 Seating cum Luggage Rake

== Traction ==
Both trains are hauled by a Lucknow Loco Shed-based WDM-3A diesel locomotive from Allahabad to Jaunpur and vice versa.

== Rake sharing ==
The train shares its rake with 14307/14308 Prayag–Bareilly Express.

== See also ==
- Prayag Junction railway station
- Jaunpur Junction railway station
- Prayag–Bareilly Express
