= Malda Town–New Delhi Express =

Train in India

Overview
- Service type: Express
- First service: 26 March 2010; 16 years ago
- Current operator: Northern Railway

Route
- Termini: Malda Town (MLDT); New Delhi (NDLS)
- Stops: 21
- Distance travelled: 1,425 km (885 mi)
- Average journey time: 29hrs 05mins
- Service frequency: Bi-weekly (Note: Runs two days in a week for every direction.)
- Train number: 14003 / 14004

On-board services
- Classes: First AC, AC 2 tier, AC 3 tier, Sleeper class, General Unreserved
- Seating arrangements: No
- Sleeping arrangements: Yes
- Catering facilities: On-board catering E-catering
- Observation facilities: Large windows
- Baggage facilities: No
- Other facilities: Below the seats

Technical
- Rolling stock: LHB coach
- Track gauge: 1,676 mm (5 ft 6 in)
- Operating speed: 49 km/h (30 mph) average including halts

The 14003 / 14004 Malda Town–New Delhi Express is an Express train belonging to Northern Railway zone that runs between Malda Town and New Delhi in India. It is currently being operated with 14003/14004 train numbers on bi-weekly basis.

== Service ==
The 14003 Malda Town–New Delhi New Farakka Express has an average speed of 48 km/h and covers 1425 km in 29h 35m. 14004 New Delhi–Malda Town New Farakka Express has an average speed of 48 km/h and covers 1425 km in 29h 35m.

== Route and halts ==
The important halts of the train are:

- Malda Town
- New Farakka Junction
- Barharwa Junction
- Sahibganj Junction
- Bhagalpur Junction
- Jamalpur Junction
- Abhaipur
- Kiul Junction
- Patna Junction
- Ara Junction
- Buxar
- Mughalsarai Junction
- Varanasi Junction
- Pratapgarh Junction
- Amethi
- Gauriganj
- Rae Bareli Junction
- Lucknow Charbagh
- Bareilly Junction
- Moradabad Junction
- Ghaziabad Junction
- New Delhi

== Coach composition ==
The train has LHB rakes with a maximum speed of 160 km/h. The train consists of 22 coaches:

- 1 AC II Tier
- 2 AC III Tier
- 11 Sleeper coaches
- 6 General
- 2 EOG

== Traction ==
Both trains are hauled by a Ghaziabad Loco Shed-based WAP-7 electric locomotive from Malda Town to New Delhi and vice versa.

== Rake sharing ==
The train shares its rake with 22403/22404 Puducherry–New Delhi Express.

== See also ==
- Malda Town railway station
- Delhi Junction railway station
- Farakka Express (via Sultanpur)
- Farakka Express (via Faizabad)
- Puducherry–New Delhi Express
