= Raebareli Junction railway station =

Railway station in Uttar Pradesh, India

Raebareli Junction रायबरेली जंक्शन
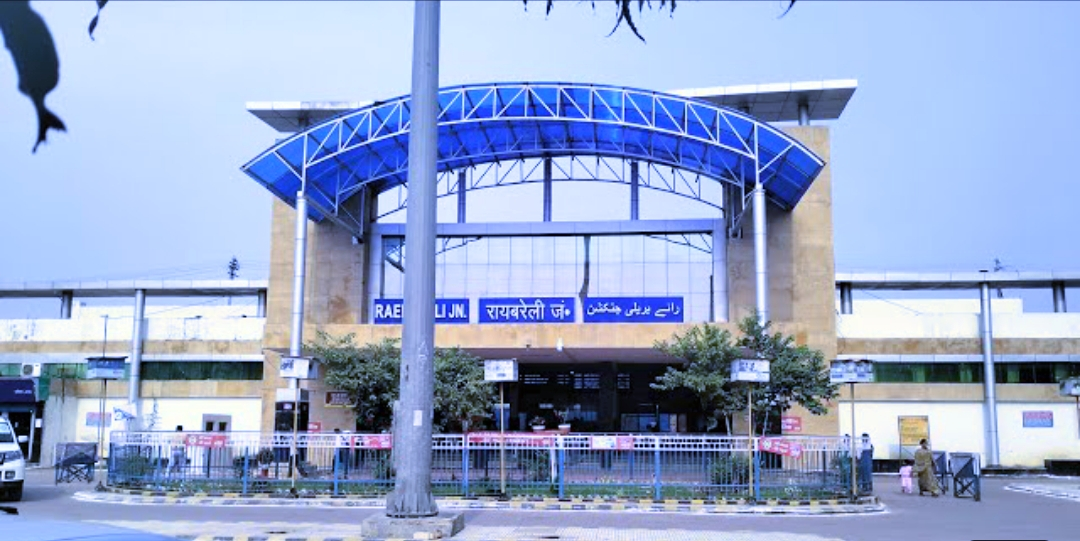

General information
- Location: Railway Station Road, Near Mansha Devi Temple Raebareli, Uttar Pradesh; India
- Coordinates: 26.2322°N 81.2396°E
- Elevation: 116 metres (381 ft)
- System: Indian Railways station
- Owner: Ministry of Railways (India)
- Operator: Indian Railways
- Lines: Varanasi–Rae Bareli–Lucknow line; Prayagraj–Raebareli–Lucknow line; Raebareli–Dariyapur–Dalmau–Unnao line; Raebareli–Akbarganj–Ayodhya line (Route Passed)
- Platforms: 6
- Tracks: 12
- Connections: Auto stand

Construction
- Structure type: A Grade
- Platform levels: High level platforms
- Parking: Available
- Cycle facilities: Available
- Accessible: Disabled access

Other information
- Status: Functioning
- Station code: RBL
- Zone(s): Northern Railway
- Division(s): Lucknow NR
- Fare zone: Northern Railway
- Classification: NSG-3

History
- Opened: 18 October 1864; 161 years ago
- Rebuilt: Remodeled in 2021-22
- Electrified: Yes ( Since 2018)

Passengers
- 25000+
Location
- Location within India Location within Uttar Pradesh

Raebareli Junction railway station is a main railway station in Raebareli district, Uttar Pradesh. Its code is RBL. It serves Raebareli city. The main city station consists of six platforms (5 Full and 1 Terminated). It has facilities including water and sanitation.

It is an A1 category railway station that lies on Northern Railway Zone under Lucknow division.

Raebareli lies on Varanasi–Rae Bareli–Lucknow line and Raebareli–Prayagraj rail line of the Northern Railway. The first railway line Raebareli that featured on Rae Bareli map.

In March 2015, 39 dead, 150 people injured as Varanasi–Dehradun Express derails in Raebareli.

== Trains ==
- Neelachal Express
- Archana Express
- Yesvantpur–Lucknow Express (via Kacheguda)
- Yesvantpur–Lucknow Express (via Vijayawada)
- Udyognagri Express
- Howrah–Jaisalmer Superfast Express
- Varanasi–Anand Vihar Terminal Garib Rath Express
- Marudhar Express (via Pratapgarh)
- Triveni Express
- Kashi Vishwanath Express
- Prayagraj–Haridwar Express
- Ganga Gomti Express
- Ekatmata Express
- Jaunpur–Rae Bareli Express
- Varanasi–Dehradun Express
- Varanasi–Lucknow Intercity Express
- Punjab Mail
- Padmavat Express
- Shaktinagar Terminal–Tanakpur Express
- Malda Town–Anand Vihar Weekly Express
- Rae Bareli–Kanpur Passenger
- Rae Bareli–Raghurajsingh Passenger
- Rae Bareli–Unchahar Passenger
- Saket Link Express
- Prayag–Bareilly Express
- Jaunpur–Rae Bareli Express
- Rae Bareli–Kanpur Passenger (via Unchahar)
- Gorakhpur-Prayagraj Jn Vande Bharat Express(22549)

== Gallery ==
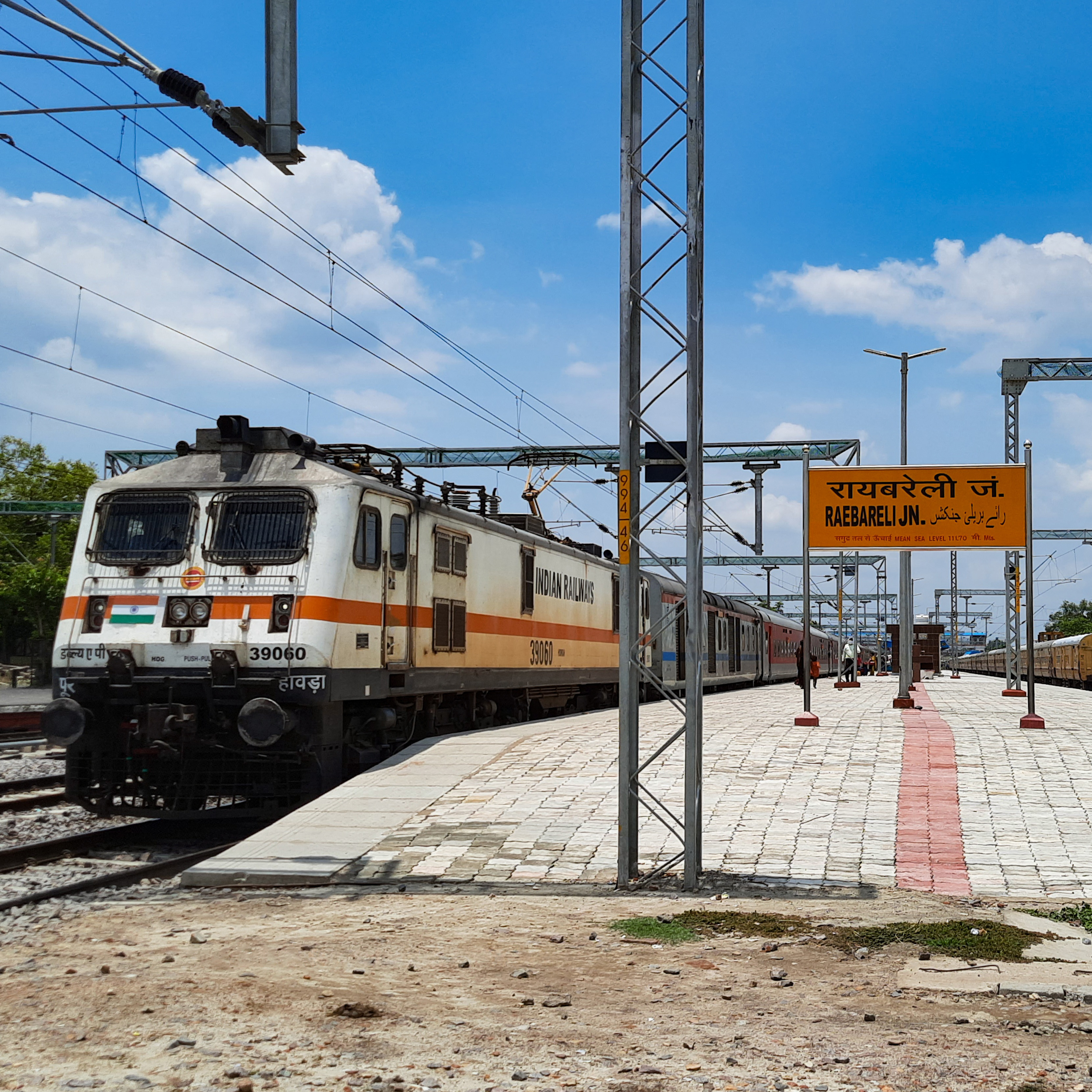
13006 Amritsar - Howrah Mail on pf no. 2 at Raebareli Jn.

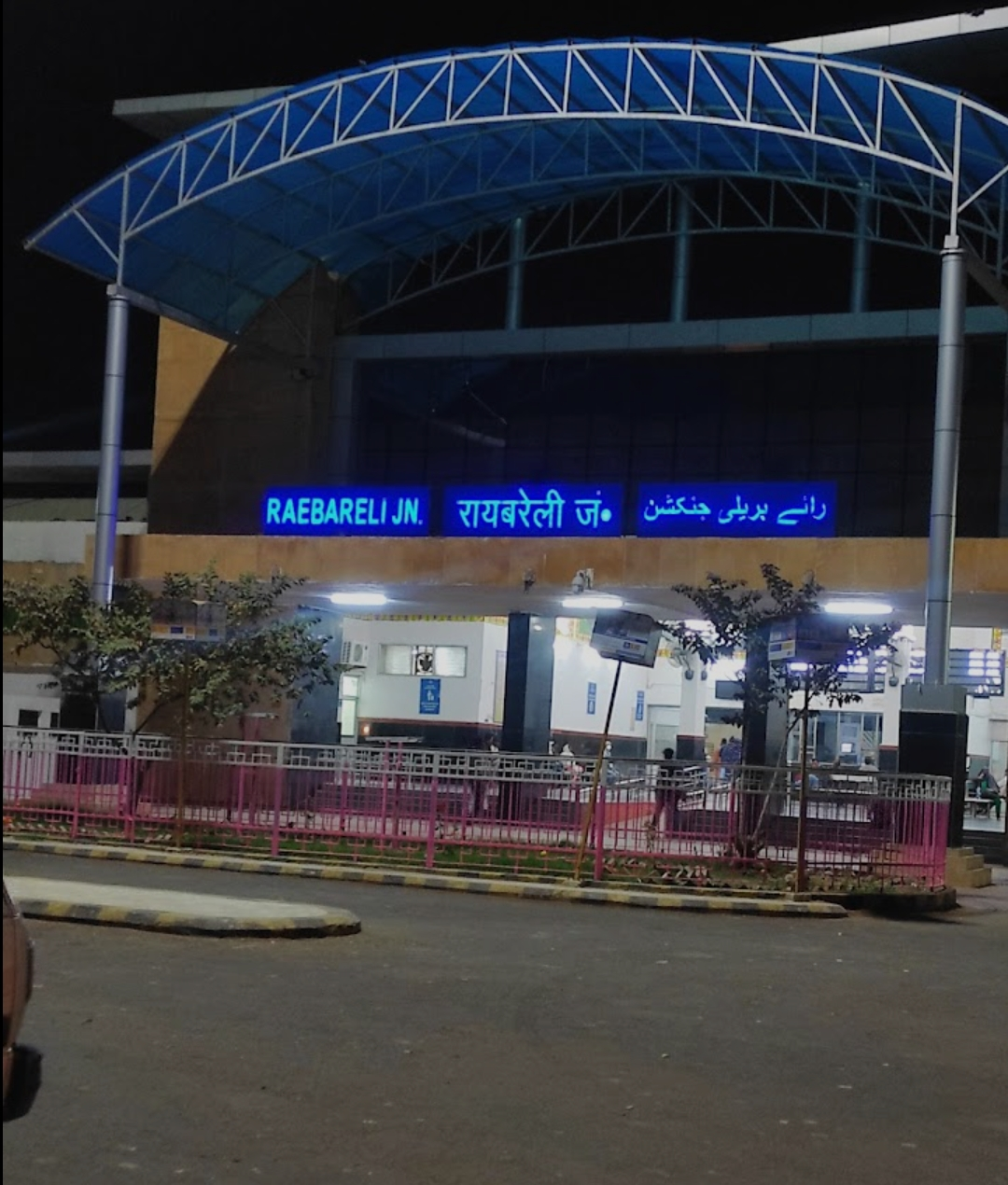
Night view of Rae Bareli railway station (outside)

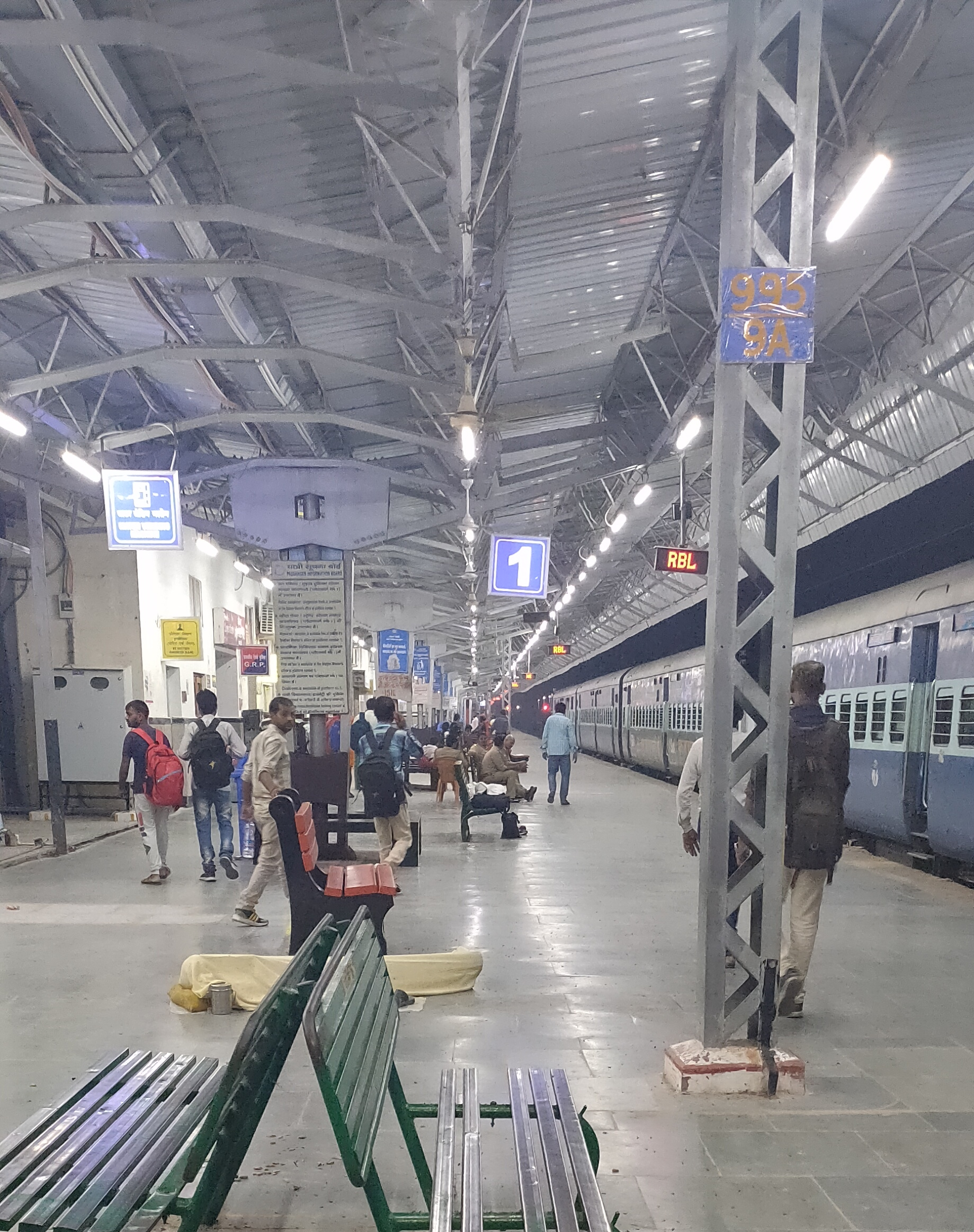
Night view of Rae Bareli railway station (inside)

== See also ==
- Modern Coach Factory
