= Pratapgarh–Kanpur Intercity Express =

Train in India

Pratapgarh–Kanpur Central Intercity Express
Overview
- Service type: Express
- Current operator: North Central Railway zone

Route
- Termini: Pratapgarh; Kanpur Central
- Stops: 13
- Distance travelled: 245 km (152 mi)
- Average journey time: 5 hours 15 mins
- Service frequency: Daily
- Train number: 14123 / 14124

On-board services
- Class: general unreserved
- Seating arrangements: Yes
- Sleeping arrangements: No
- Catering facilities: No

Technical
- Rolling stock: Standard Indian Railways Coaches
- Operating speed: 46.5 km/h (29 mph)

The 14123/24 Pratapgarh–Kanpur Central Intercity Express is an Express train belonging to Indian Railways North Central Railway zone that runs between Pratapgarh and Kanpur Central in India.

It operates as train number 14123 from Pratapgarh to Kanpur Central and as train number 14124 in the reverse direction serving the states of Uttar Pradesh.

== Coaches ==
The 14123 / 24 Pratapgarh–Kanpur Central Intercity Express has 12 general unreserved & two SLR (seating with luggage rake) coaches . It does not carry a pantry car coach.

As is customary with most train services in India, coach composition may be amended at the discretion of Indian Railways depending on demand.

== Service ==
The 14123 Pratapgarh–Kanpur Central Intercity Express covers the distance of 245 km (152 mi) in 5 hours 05 mins (48 km/h) and in 5 hours 25 mins as the 14124 Kanpur Central–Pratapgarh Intercity Express (45 km/h).

As the average speed of the train is less than 55 km/h (34 mph), as per railway rules, its fare doesn't includes a Superfast surcharge.

== Routing ==
The 14123 / 24 Pratapgarh–Kanpur Central Intercity Express runs from Pratapgarh via Amethi, Rae Bareli Junction, Lucknow Charbagh, Unnao Junction to Kanpur Central.

== Traction ==
a Jhansi-based WDP-4 electric locomotive pulls the train to its destination.
