= Amethi railway station =

Railway station in Uttar Pradesh, India

General information
- Location: Railway Station Road, Amethi, Uttar Pradesh; India
- Coordinates: 26.1530°N 81.8063°E
- Elevation: 108 metres (354 ft)
- System: Indian Railways Station
- Owner: Indian Railways
- Operator: Northern Railways
- Line: Varanasi–Rae Bareli–Lucknow line
- Platforms: 2
- Tracks: 4
- Connections: Taxi stand, Auto Stand

Construction
- Structure type: Standard (on-ground station)
- Platform levels: High Level
- Parking: Available (on the out-station side)
- Cycle facilities: Available
- Accessible: Disabled access

Other information
- Status: Functioning
- Station code: AME
- Zone(s): Northern Railway zone
- Division(s): Lucknow NR

History
- Opened: 1970
- Rebuilt: 1987

Passengers
- 15000

Services
Wi-Fi, Clean Drinking Water, Parking, Waiting Rooms, toilets.
- Computerized ticketing counters Parking Disabled access WC Taxi stand Public transportation
Location
- Location within Uttar Pradesh Location within India

Amethi railway station(station code: AME) is one of the most important and busiest railway stations in Uttar Pradesh serving the city of Amethi. This station has two platforms and a total of four tracks. This station is operated by the Northern Railway. The station is also proposed to become a junction in the near future. The following facilities have been provided to the passengers in the station. In which there is :- Wi-Fi, clean drinking water, waiting rooms, chair sitting, Parking(outstation side) and toilet etc.

== Major trains ==
Some of the important trains that runs from Amethi are :

- Varanasi–Anand Vihar Terminal Garib Rath Express
- Neelachal Express
- Bhopal–Pratapgarh Express (via Lucknow)
- Archana Express
- Yesvantpur–Lucknow Express (via Kacheguda)
- Lucknow–Yesvantpur Express
- Udyognagri Express
- Howrah–Jaisalmer Superfast Express
- Howrah–Lalkuan Express
- Varanasi–Lucknow Intercity Express (via Pratapgarh)
- Ekatmata Express
- Padmavat Express
- Malda Town–Anand Vihar Weekly Express
- Marudhar Express (via Pratapgarh)
- Malda Town–New Delhi Express
- Jaunpur–Rae Bareli Express
