= Banaras-Anand Vihar Terminal Garib Rath Express =

Train in India

Overview
- Service type: Garib Rath
- Locale: Uttar Pradesh & Delhi
- First service: 3 March 2009; 16 years ago
- Current operator(s): North Eastern Railway

Route
- Termini: Banaras (BSBS); Anand Vihar Terminal (ANVT)
- Stops: 7
- Distance travelled: 781 km (485 mi)
- Average journey time: 14 hrs 10 min
- Service frequency: Bi-weekly
- Train number(s): 22541 / 22542

On-board services
- Class(es): AC 3 tier Economy
- Seating arrangements: No
- Sleeping arrangements: Yes
- Catering facilities: On-board catering, E-catering
- Observation facilities: Large windows
- Other facilities: Below the seats

Technical
- Rolling stock: LHB coach
- Track gauge: 1,676 mm (5 ft 6 in)
- Operating speed: 55 km/h (34 mph) Average including halts.
Route map
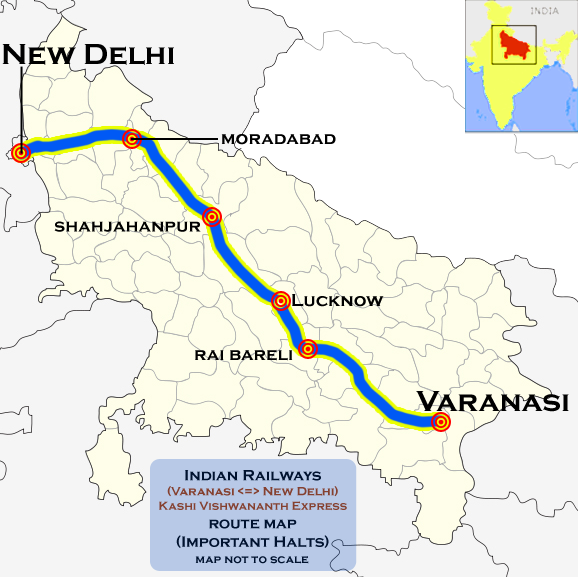

The 22541 / 22542 Banaras–Anand Vihar Terminal Garib Rath Express is a train between Banaras and Anand Vihar Terminal of Delhi. A bi-weekly train that runs from Varanasi Junction on Sunday and Thursday as 22541 and from Anand Vihar Terminal on Monday and Friday as 22542.

The main towns along the route are Bhadohi, Pratapgarh, Amethi, Rae Bareli, Lucknow, Bareilly and Moradabad.

== Coach composition ==
The train runs with 20 LHB AC III Tier Economy coaches and 2 EoG / Seating cum Luggage Rake.

== Route and halts ==
- Banaras
- Pratapgarh
- Amethi
- RaeBereli
- Lucknow Charbagh
- Bareilly
- Moradabad
- Anand Vihar Terminal

== Traction ==
It is hauled by a Ghaziabad Loco Shed based WAP-5 / WAP-7 electric locomotive from Banaras to Anand Vihar Terminal and vice versa.
