= Gariaon, Jaunpur =

- Village
- Location within Uttar Pradesh Location within India
- Coordinates: 25.62319°N 82.27325°E
- Country: India
- State: Uttar Pradesh
- District: Jaunpur
- Elevation: 93.27 m (306.0 ft)

Population
  - Total: 2,661

Languages
  - Official: Hindi, Urdu
- Time zone: UTC+5:30 (IST)
- PIN: 222204
- Vehicle registration: UP62

Gariaon is a village in Jaunpur district in the Indian state of Uttar Pradesh. It is also known as Gariaon Bazar. Gariaon is located 6 km kilometres north-west of Janghai Junction Railway Station and 13 km east of Mungra Badshahpur.

== Population ==
The population in Gariaon village is 2,661 as per the survey of census during 2011 by Indian Government. There are 332 Households in Gariaon. There are 1,341 males (50%) and 1,320 females (50%). Scheduled Cast are 749 (28%). Total Scheduled Tribe are 0 (0% ). Literates are 1,541 (58% ) and total Illiterates 1,120 (42%) in Gariaon. Workers are 612 (23%), 438 are regular and 174 are Irregular. There are 2,049 Non Workers (77%).

== Educational institutes ==
=== Schools ===
- T.R. Memorial Primary School
- Primary School Kathari Pur
- Samar Bahadur Singh Public School
- Madarsa Gulshane Raja
- Madarsa Arbia Gausia Talimul Goran
- Samar Bahadur Singh Public Junior High school

=== College ===
- Samar Bahadur Singh Intermediate College
- Khemraj Shukla Inter College

== Other organizations ==
- Shanti Nandan Bauddha Welfare Society

== Transportation ==
=== Rail ===
Gariaon is well-connected with all major cities of India thanks to Indian Railways. It has two nearby railway stations: Janghai Junction (JNH) and Badshahpur (BSE). Janghai Jn, and Badshapur railway stations are easily reachable from here.

=== Road ===
Gariaon is well-connected to Lucknow, Gorakhpur, Varanasi, Allahabad and other cities like Azamgarh, Mirzapur, Janghai, Sultanpur, Ghazipur etc.

=== Airport ===
Lal Bahadur Shastri Airport or Varanasi Airport (IATA: VNS, ICAO: VIBN) is a public airport located at Babatpur 18 km (11 mi) northwest of Varanasi, and about 80 km from Gariaon Village. It located at Jaunpur-Varanasi highway.
