= Prayag–Bareilly Express =

Train in India

Overview
- Service type: Express
- Current operator: Northern Railway zone

Route
- Termini: Prayag Junction (PRG); Bareilly Junction (BE)
- Stops: 38
- Distance travelled: 461 km (286 mi)
- Average journey time: 12h 40m
- Service frequency: Daily (Note: Runs seven days in a week for every direction.)
- Train number: 14307/14308

On-board services
- Classes: AC 2 tier, AC 3 tier, Sleeper class, General Unreserved
- Seating arrangements: No
- Sleeping arrangements: Yes
- Catering facilities: On-board catering E-catering
- Observation facilities: ICF coach
- Entertainment facilities: No
- Baggage facilities: No
- Other facilities: Below the seats

Technical
- Rolling stock: 2
- Track gauge: 1,676 mm (5 ft 6 in)
- Operating speed: 36 km/h (22 mph), including halts

The Prayag–Bareilly Express is an Express train belonging to Northern Railway zone that runs between Prayag Junction (in Allahabad) and Bareilly Junction in India. It is currently being operated with 14307/14308 train numbers on a daily basis.

== Service ==
The 14307/Prayag–Bareilly Express has an average speed of 36 km/h and covers 461 km in 12h 40m. The 14308/Bareilly–Prayag Express has an average speed of 38 km/h and covers 461 km in 12h 15m.

== Route and halts ==
The important halts of the train are:

- Prayag Junction
- Pratapgarh Junction
- Amethi
- Gauriganj
- Rae Bareli Junction
- Lucknow Charbagh
- Alamnagar
- Hardoi
- Shahjahanpur
- Bareilly Junction

== Coach composition ==
The train has standard ICF rakes with max speed of 110 kmph. The train consists of 16 coaches:

- 8 General Unreserved
- 2 Seating cum Luggage Rake

== Traction ==
Both trains are hauled by a Lucknow Loco Shed-based WDM-3A diesel locomotive from Allahabad to Bareilly and vice versa.

== Rake sharing ==
The train shares its rake with 54375/54376 Prayag–Jaunpur Passenger.

== See also ==
- Prayag Junction railway station
- Bareilly Junction railway station
- Prayag–Jaunpur Passenger
