= JNH =

JNH may refer to:

- JNH, the IATA code for Jiaxing Nanhu Airport, Zhejiang, China
- JNH, the Indian Railways station code for Janghai Junction railway station, Uttar Pradesh, India
