= Unnao Junction railway station =

Railway station in Uttar Pradesh, India

Unnao Junction
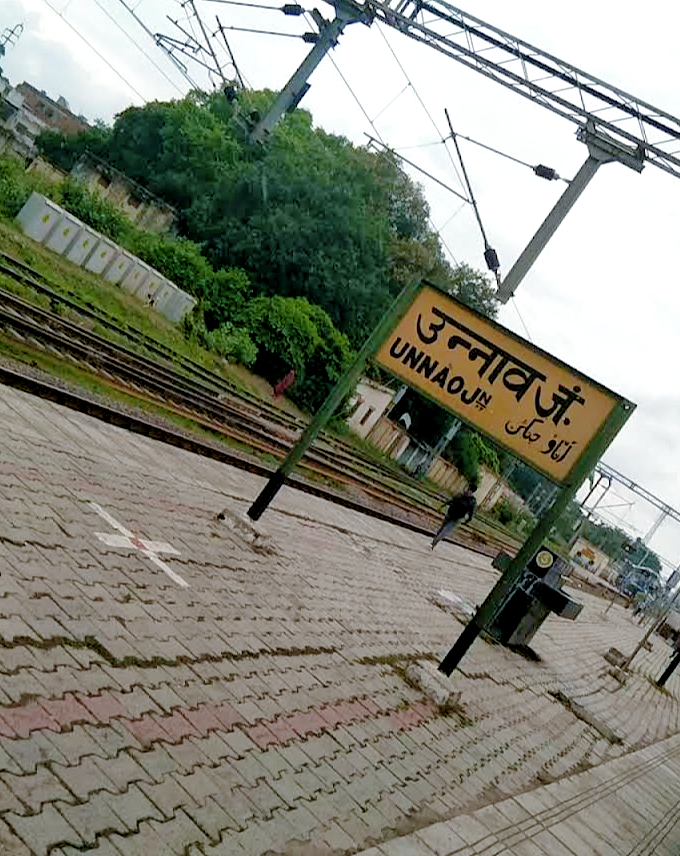
- Unnao Junction Railway Station

General information
- Location: SH 38, Unnao, Uttar Pradesh; India
- Coordinates: 26°32′57″N 80°29′12″E
- Elevation: 129 metres (423 ft)
- System: Indian Railways junction station
- Owner: Ministry of Railways (India)
- Operator: Indian Railways
- Lines: Lucknow–Kanpur Suburban Railway, Unnao–Balamau line, Unnao–Rae bareli line via Dalmau–Daryapur
- Platforms: 5
- Tracks: 7

Construction
- Structure type: At grade
- Parking: Yes
- Cycle facilities: No

Other information
- Status: Functioning
- Station code: ON
- Zone(s): Northern Railway
- Division(s): Lucknow NR

History
- Opened: 1867: 154 YEARS
- Electrified: 1999–2000 Double Line-Electrified
- Former names: Indian Branch Railway Company

Services
Preceding station	Indian Railways	Following station
Magarwara towards Kanpur Central	Northern Railway zone	Sonik towards Lucknow Charbagh
Terminus	Northern Railway zone Unnao–Balamau Main Line	Patiyara towards Balamau Jn.
Magarwara towards Kanpur Central	Northern Railway zone Varanasi–Kanpur branch line	Korari towards Dalmau Jn.
Location
- Location within India Location within Uttar Pradesh

Unnao Junction railway station is on the Lucknow–Kanpur Suburban Railway and Varanasi–Kanpur branch line. It is located in Unnao district in the Indian state of Uttar Pradesh. It serves Unnao and the surrounding areas.

== History ==
In 1867, the Indian Branch Railway Company opened the Kanpur–Lucknow line.

The Oudh and Rohilkhand Railway opened the line from Varanasi to Lucknow in 1872.

== Electrification ==
The Kanpur–Kanpur Bridge–Unnao–Lucknow section was electrified in 1999–2000.
