= Yesvantpur–Mangaluru Central Weekly Express =

Yesvantpur–Mangalore Central Weekly Express
Overview
- Service type: Express
- First service: September 29, 2013; 12 years ago
- Current operator: South Western Railway zone

Route
- Termini: Yesvantpur Junction (YPR); Mangaluru Central (MAQ)
- Stops: 12
- Distance travelled: 834 km (518 mi)
- Average journey time: 17 hours 45 minutes
- Service frequency: Weekly
- Train number: 16565/16566

On-board services
- Classes: AC 2 tier, AC 3 tier, Sleeper class, General Unreserved
- Seating arrangements: No
- Sleeping arrangements: Yes
- Catering facilities: No
- Entertainment facilities: No
- Baggage facilities: Below the seats

Technical
- Rolling stock: 2
- Track gauge: 1,676 mm (5 ft 6 in)
- Operating speed: 47 km/h (29 mph)

The Yesvantpur–Mangaluru Central Weekly Express is an intercity train started by the South Western Railway zone of the Indian Railways of the Indian Railways connecting Yesvantpur in Karnataka and Mangaluru Central of Karnataka. It is currently being operated with 16565/16566 train numbers on a weekly basis.

== History ==
With an increased demand for transport development between Mangalore and Bangalore. Mangalore is a fast-developing city, but the only problem was the development of proper and timely transport facility with the Karnataka state capital was absent. With the introduction of the Mangalore Yaswanthpur Express, adequate transport was developed between the two important cities.

== Service ==
The 16565/Yesvantpur–Mangaluru Central Weekly Express has an average speed of 47 km/h and covers 834 km in 17 hrs 45 mins. 16566/Mangaluru Central–Yesvantpur Weekly Express has an average speed of 48 km/h and 834 km in 17 hrs 30 mins.

== Route and halts ==
The important halts of the train are:

- Yesvantpur Junction
- Banaswadi
- Krishnarajapuram
- Bangarapet Junction
- Kuppam
- Salem Junction
- Erode Junction
- Tiruppur
- Coimbatore Junction
- Palakkad Junction
- Shoranur Junction
- Tirur
- Kozhikode
- Vadakara
- Thalassery
- Kannur
- Payyanur
- Kanhangad
- Kasaragod
- Mangaluru Central

== Coach composite ==
The train has standard LHB rakes with max speed of 130 kmph. The train consists of 22 coaches:

- 1 AC First-class
- 2 AC II Tier
- 4 AC III Tier
- 9 Sleeper coaches
- 4 General
- 2 Generator car Coach

== Schedule ==
Train number	Station code	Departure station	Departure time	Departure day	Arrival station	Arrival time	Arrival day
16565	YPR	Yesvantpur (Bangalore)	11:55 PM	Sunday	Mangalore Central	5:45 PM	Monday
16566	MAQ	Mangalore Central	8:15 PM	Monday	Yesvantpur (Bangalore)	1:30 PM	Wednesday

== Rake sharing ==
12539/40 - Yesvantpur–Lucknow Express (via Vijayawada)
