= 2015 Uttar Pradesh train accident =

Railway incident in Uttar Pradesh, India

Coordinates: 26.4775°N 81.1046°E

2015 Uttar Pradesh derailment

Details
- Date: 20 March 2015; 09:10
- Location: Bachhrawan, Raebareli, Uttar Pradesh
- Country: India
- Line: Varanasi-Rae Bareli-Lucknow line
- Operator: Indian Railways
- Incident type: Derailment
- Cause: Under investigation, brake failure suspected and overshot a red signal

Statistics
- Trains: 1 (Dehradun Varanasi Janata Express)
- Vehicles: WDM-3D diesel locomotive
- Passengers: 400+
- Crew: 85
- Deaths: 58
- Injured: 150+
- Damage: WDM-3D and 2 carriages derailed and 1 carriage crushed and flattened

The 2015 Uttar Pradesh train accident occurred on 20 March 2015. The Dehradun Varanasi Janata Express (train number 14266) derailed near Bachhrawan in Raebareli, Uttar Pradesh, northern India, resulting in at least 58 deaths and 150 people being injured. The accident was attributed to brake failure.

== Accident ==
At 09:10 local time (03:40 UTC) on 20 March 2015, a passenger train overshot a signal at Bachhrawan, Uttar Pradesh, India. The locomotive and two carriages were derailed. The train was reported to be carrying more than 400 passengers and 85 members of staff. The train was the Janata Express from Dehradun to Varanasi. The driver reported by radio that his brakes had failed, and that he could not stop the train. It was diverted into a siding and crashed through the buffers at Bachhrawan. Photographs show that the carriage next to the locomotive was severely telescoped, it was reported to have been packed with passengers. Fifty-eight people were killed, and more than 150 injured. A preliminary report by the Ministry of Civil Aviation cited 39 dead and 38 injured passengers. A team of doctors from the King George's Medical University in Lucknow was dispatched to the scene of the accident. The injured were taken to the King George's Medical University and Sanjay Gandhi Post Graduate Institute of Medical Sciences in Lucknow, or to a hospital in Rae Bareli.

== Investigation ==
An investigation was opened into the accident by the Commission of Railway Safety. Brake failure was stated by unidentified railway sources as the cause of the accident. The train's driver and guard were seen by witnesses signalling that there was a problem with the train.

Provisional findings of the Commission of Railway Safety discussed on a conference in October 2015 report a "discontinuity of brake pipe pressure between the train engine and the trailing load of passenger coaches caused by wrong position of additional cut out cock provided in the brake pipe of the locomotive which is not having the safety features specified in the design against inadvertent or unauthorized operation".

== See also ==
- List of Indian rail incidents
- List of rail accidents (2010–2019)
