= Jarauna railway station =

Railway station in Uttar Pradesh, India

Jarauna Railway Station
- Jarauna railway station

General information
- Location: Meerganj, Jaunpur, Uttar Pradesh; India
- Coordinates: 25.5568°N 82.3996°E
- Elevation: 92 metres (302 ft)
- System: Regional rail, Commuter rail station
- Owner: Indian Railways
- Operator: Northern Railway zone
- Line: Prayagraj-Mau-Gorakhpur line
- Platforms: 1
- Tracks: 1
- Connections: Bus, Auto

Construction
- Structure type: At-grade (Indo-Gothic)
- Parking: Yes
- Cycle facilities: Yes
- Accessible: Disabled access

Other information
- Station code: JUA
- Zone(s): Northern Railway zone
- Division(s): Lucknow NR
- Fare zone: Indian Railways

History
- Electrified: 2019

Passengers
- 350
Location
- Location within India Location within Uttar Pradesh

Jarauna railway station (station code JUA) is located in Meerganj, Jaunpur District, Uttar Pradesh, India.

This station is part of Northern Railway Zone's Lucknow NR Division and the Prayagraj-Mau-Gorakhpur line.

== Overview ==
Jarauna Railway station is a low-revenue station, serving over 350 passengers and 4 passenger train on daily basis. It is under the administrative control of the Northern Railway zone's Lucknow NR railway division.

It is one of the railway stations in Jaunpur district, Uttar Pradesh, India. It is situated on the south-west side of the city about 45 km from Jaunpur Junction Railway Station. This station is under the Prayagraj-Mau-Gorakhpur line.

== History ==
=== Historical context and development ===
- The line: Jarauna is situated on the Zafrabad Junction–Janghai Junction line. This section was developed as part of the broader effort by the Oudh and Rohilkhand Railway to connect major trade and administrative hubs in Uttar Pradesh.
- Regional expansion: The foundational rail network in the region began in 1872 with the opening of the broad-gauge line between Varanasi and Lucknow. Further branch lines, such as the one connecting to Janghai, were established shortly thereafter to improve local transit.
- Local significance: Historically, the station was established to serve the rural populations of Meerganj and surrounding villages, providing them access to larger junctions like Janghai and Jaunpur.

=== Modern evolution ===
- Electrification: Like much of the Northern Railway's Lucknow Division, the track passing through Jarauna has been upgraded to a 25 KV AC electric-line to support modern express and passenger trains.
- Zone and division: The station has remained under the administrative control of the Lucknow North Division of the Northern Railway zone.
- Recent status: It currently holds a Grade E (Small) station status, primarily facilitating local travel between Jaunpur and Prayagraj.

== See also ==
- Northern Railway Zone
- Janghai Junction
- Jaunpur Junction
- Prayagraj Junction
- Prayagraj-Mau-Gorakhpur line
