= Yesvantpur–Lucknow Superfast Express (via Perambur) =

Train in India

Overview
- Service type: Superfast Express
- First service: 12 February 2010; 15 years ago
- Current operator(s): South Western Railway

Route
- Termini: Yesvantpur Junction (YPR); Lucknow Junction (LKO)
- Stops: 17
- Distance travelled: 2,591 km (1,610 mi)
- Average journey time: 45 hours 10 mins
- Service frequency: Weekly
- Train number(s): 12539 / 12540

On-board services
- Class(es): AC 2 tier, AC 3 tier, Sleeper class, General Unreserved
- Seating arrangements: Yes
- Sleeping arrangements: Yes
- Catering facilities: On-board catering, E-catering
- Observation facilities: Large windows
- Baggage facilities: Available
- Other facilities: Below the seats

Technical
- Rolling stock: LHB coach
- Track gauge: 1,676 mm (5 ft 6 in)
- Operating speed: 57 km/h (35 mph) average including halts.
- Rake sharing: Rake sharing with 16565 / 16566 Yesvantpur–Mangalore Central Weekly Express
Route map
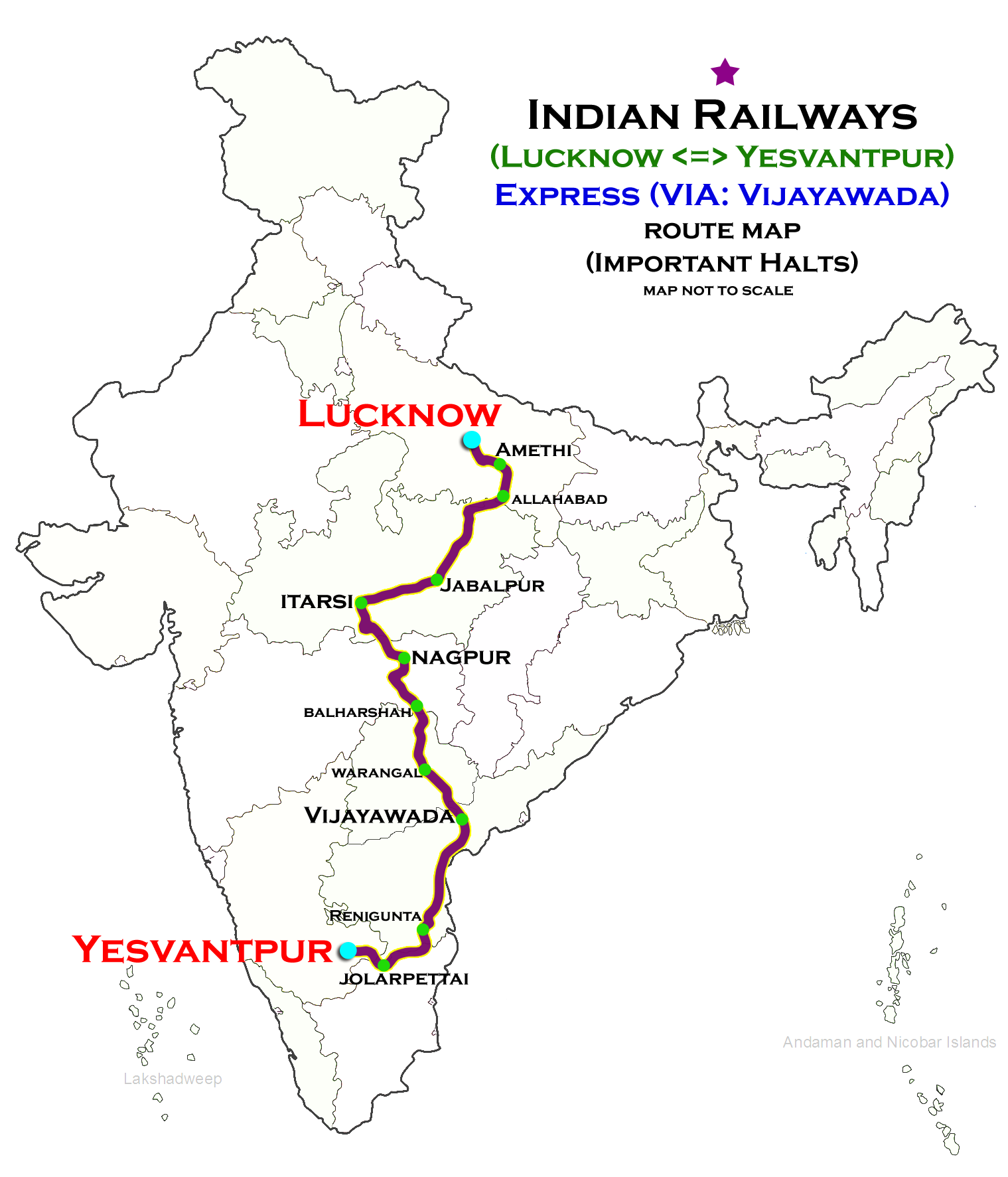

The 12539 / 12540 Yesvantpur–Lucknow Superfast Express (via Perambur) is an Superfast Express superfast train belonging to Indian Railways South Western Railway zone that runs between Yesvantpur Junction and Lucknow Junction in India.
