= Padmavat Express =

Train in India

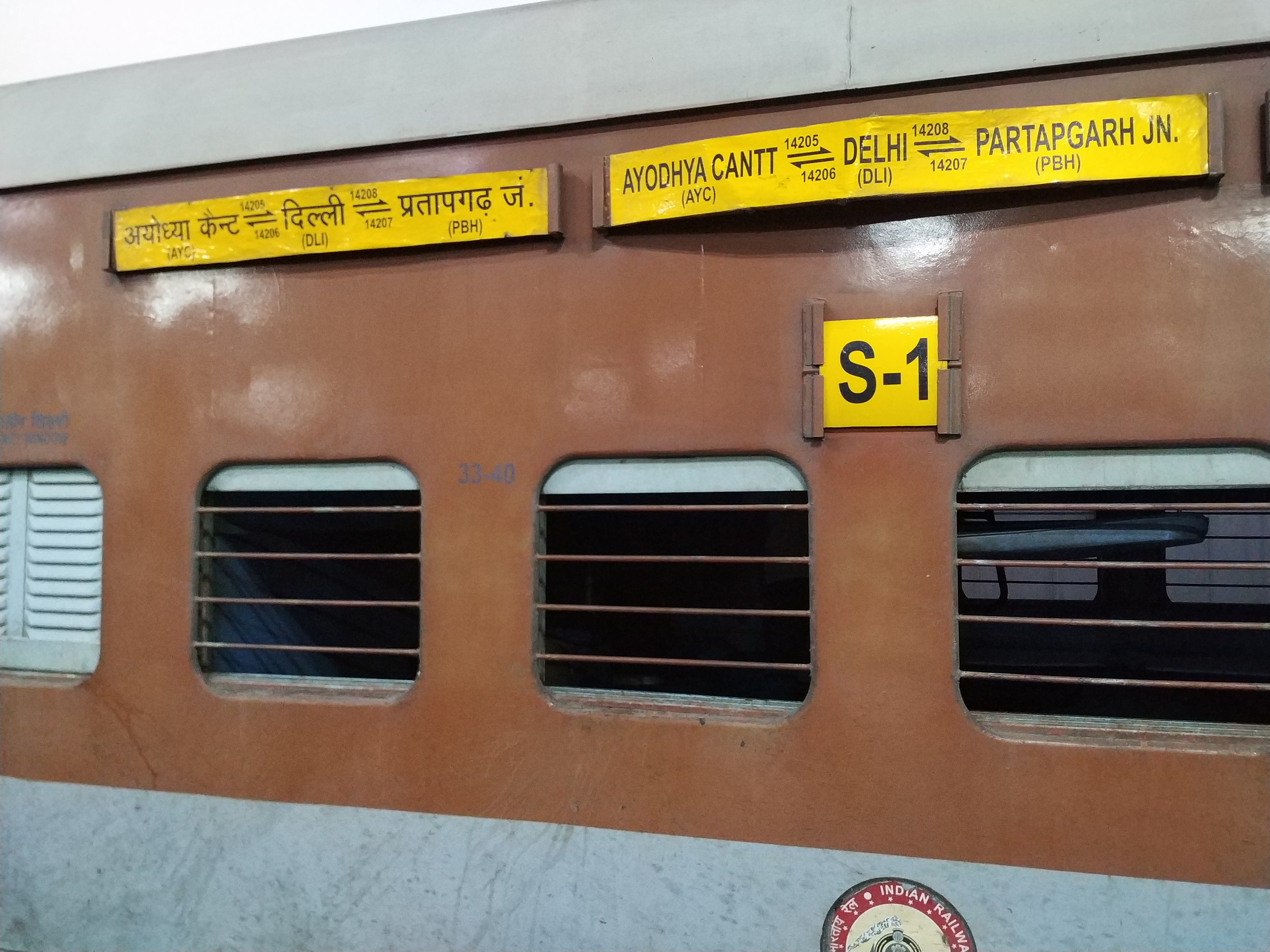
- Padmavat Express at Delhi Junction.

Overview
- Service type: Express
- Locale: Delhi & Uttar Pradesh
- Current operator(s): Northern Railway

Route
- Termini: Old Delhi (DLI); Pratapgarh (PBH)
- Stops: 16
- Distance travelled: 659 km (409 mi)
- Average journey time: 13 hours 30 minutes
- Service frequency: Daily
- Train number(s): 14207 / 14208

On-board services
- Class(es): AC 2 tier, AC 3 tier, Sleeper Class, General Unreserved
- Seating arrangements: Yes
- Sleeping arrangements: Yes
- Catering facilities: On-board catering, E-catering
- Observation facilities: Rake sharing with 14205/14206 Faizabad Delhi Express
- Baggage facilities: No
- Other facilities: Below the seats

Technical
- Rolling stock: LHB coach
- Track gauge: 1,676 mm (5 ft 6 in)
- Operating speed: 52 km/h (32 mph) average including halts.

The 14207 / 14208 Padmavat Express is a mail and passenger express train on the Indian Railways.

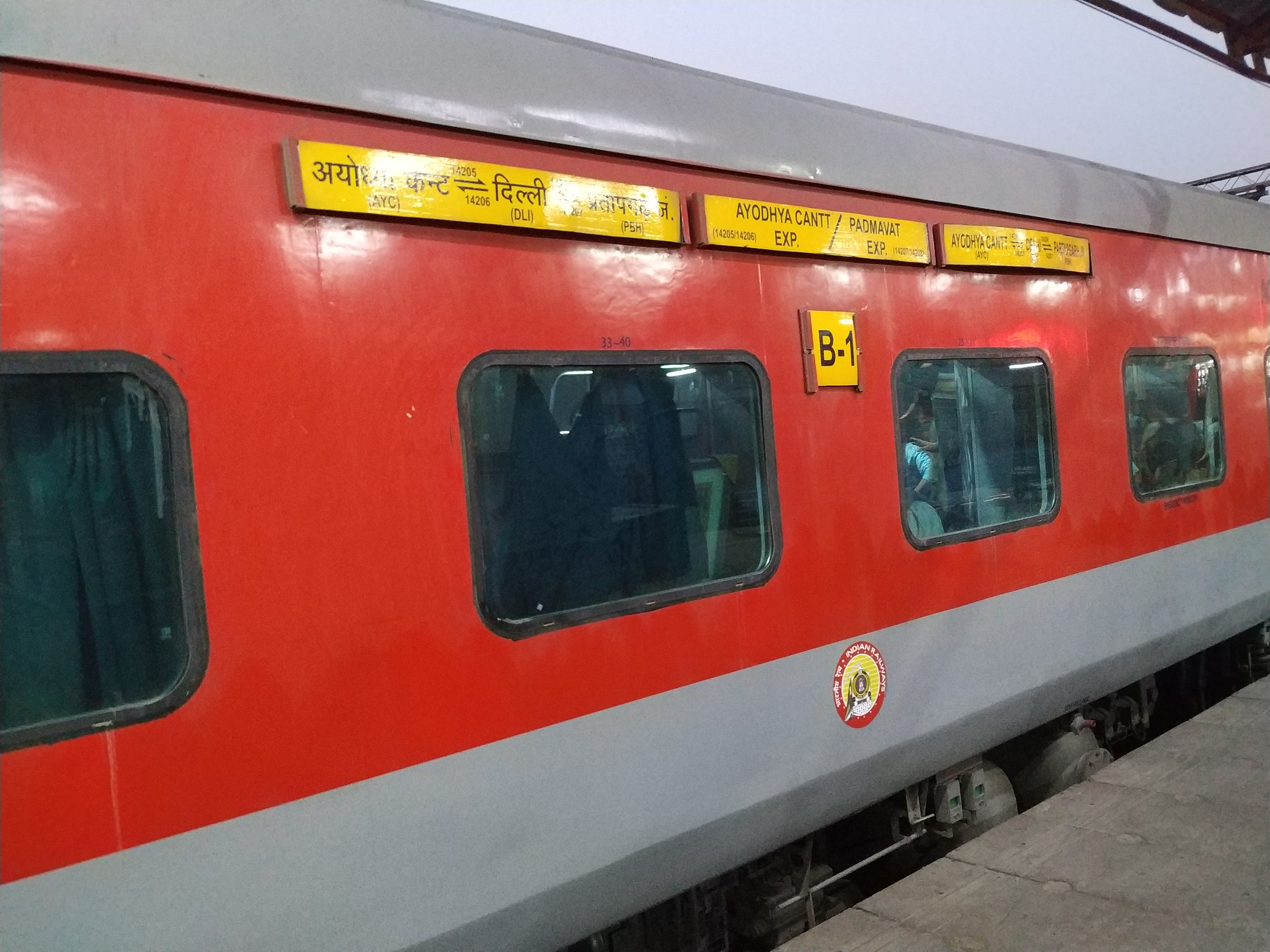
3 Tier AC Coach of Padmavat Express

The main towns along the route are Delhi, Ghaziabad, Hapur, Moradabad, Rampur, Bareilly, Shahjahanpur, Hardoi, Lucknow, Bachhrawan, Rae Bareli, Jais, Gauriganj, Amethi, Partapgarh. The train line operates on a daily basis and covers a distance of 659 kilometres from Delhi to Pratapgarh. The Padmavat Express consists of 1 First AC Cum Second AC coach, 1 Second AC coaches, 2 Third AC coaches, 8 Sleeper Class coaches, General (Un-Reserved) coaches, SLR.

It takes around 12 hours and 30 minutes to cover 659 kilometres (409 mi) at an average speed of 52 kilometres per hour (32 mph).

== Route and halts ==
- Pratapgarh Junction
- Amethi
- ma chandik dham antu
- Rae Bareli Junction
- Lucknow Charbagh
- Hardoi
- Shahjahanpur
- Bareilly
- Rampur Junction
- Moradabad
- Amroha
- Hapur
- Pilkhuwa
- Ghaziabad
- Old Delhi

== Traction ==
It is hauled by a Ghaziabad-based Indian locomotive class WAP-1, WAP-4, WAP-7 locomotive for entire journey.

== Rake sharing ==
The train shares its rake with 14205/14026 Faizabad Delhi Express.

== Schedule details ==
Station	Sch. Arrival	Sch. Departure
Delhi (DLI)	Source	07:50 PM
Ghaziabad (GZB)	08:32 PM	08:34 PM
Hapur (HPU)	09:12 PM	09:14 PM
Moradabad (MB)	10:55 PM	11:05 PM
Rampur (RMU)	11:33 PM	11:35 PM
Bareilly (BE)	12:33 AM	12:40 AM
Shahjehanpur (SPN)	01:45 AM	01:48 AM
Hardoi (HRI)	02:33 AM	02:35 AM
Lucknow Nr (LKO)	04:20 AM	04:30 AM
Bachhrawan (BCN)	05:20 AM	05:22 AM
Rae Bareli Jn (RBL)	06:05 AM	06:15 AM
Jais (JAIS)	06:47 AM	06:49 AM
Gauriganj (GNG)	07:04 AM	07:06 AM
Amethi (AME)	07:18 AM	07:20 AM
Partapgarh Jn (PBH)	08:20 AM	Destination
