= Puducherry–New Delhi Express =

Indian Railways express train

புதுச்சேரி – புது டெல்லி அதி விரைவு Puducherry–New Delhi Superfast Express
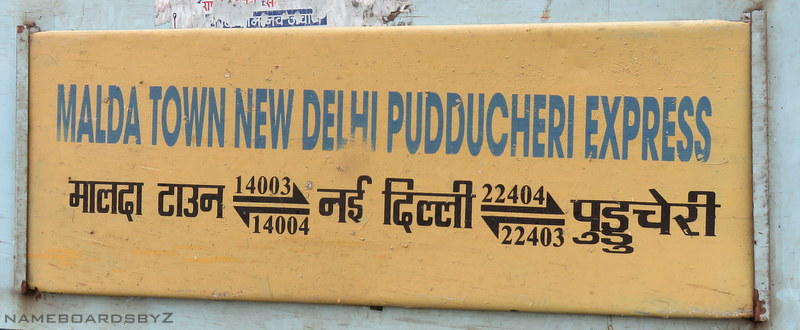

Overview
- Service type: Superfast Express
- Status: Weekly
- First service: 3 July 2011; 14 years ago
- Current operator: Northern Railway zone

Route
- Termini: Puducherry; New Delhi
- Stops: 13
- Distance travelled: 2,380 km (1,479 mi)
- Average journey time: 38 hours 20 mins
- Service frequency: Weekly
- Train number: 22403 / 22404

On-board services
- Classes: AC 1st, AC 2 tier, AC 3 tier, Sleeper class, General Unreserved
- Seating arrangements: Yes
- Sleeping arrangements: Yes
- Catering facilities: Yes

Technical
- Rolling stock: LHB coach
- Track gauge: 1,676 mm (5 ft 6 in)
- Operating speed: 56.5 km/h (35 mph), including halts

The 22403 / 22404 Puducherry - New Delhi S. F Express is a Superfast Express train belonging to Indian Railways – Northern Railway zone that runs between Puducherry and New Delhi in India via Chennai Egmore.

It operates as train number 22403 from Puducherry to New Delhi and as train number 22404 in the reverse direction, serving the states of Puducherry, Tamil Nadu, Andhra Pradesh, Telangana, Maharashtra, Madhya Pradesh, Rajasthan, Uttar Pradesh, Haryana & Delhi.

== Service ==
The 22403 Puducherry–New Delhi Express covers the distance of 2,380 km (1,479 mi) in 38 hours 20 minutes (57 km/h), and in the reverse direction, the 22404 New Delhi–Puducherry Express takes 38 hours 0 minutes (56 km/h) to cover the same distance.

== Routing ==
The 22403 / 04 Puducherry–New Delhi Express runs from Puducherry via Viluppuram Junction,Chennai Egmore, Gudur Junction, Vijayawada Junction, Warangal, Balharshah, Nagpur Junction, Itarsi Junction, Bhopal Junction, Jhansi Junction, Gwalior Junction, Agra Cantonment, Mathura Junction to New Delhi.

== Timing ==
- 22403 – Starts from Puducherry every Wednesday at 9:50 AM and reaches New Delhi on Friday 00:10 AM IST.
- 22404 – Starts for New Delhi on every Sunday at 23:15 hrs IST and reaches Puducherry on Tuesday at 13:15 hrs IST.

== Traction ==
As this route is electrified and the train belongs to Northern Railway zone, a Ghaziabad-based WAP-7 powers the train up end to end from New Delhi to Puducherry and vice versa.

== Coach composition ==
The coach composition of the 22403 / 22404 train is:

- 1 AC First Class
- 2 AC Two Tier
- 6 AC Three Tier
- 6 Sleeper coaches
- 2 General Unreserved
- 2 End-on Generator car (EOG)

Loco	1	2	3	4	5	6	7	8	9	10	11	12	13	14	15	16	17	18	19
	EOG	GEN	H1	A1	A2	B1	B2	B3	B4	B5	B6	S1	S2	S3	S4	S5	S6	GEN	EOG
