= Neelachal Express =

Train in India

- Neelachal Express At Unnao Junction railway station

Overview
- Service type: Express
- Locale: Odisha, West Bengal, Jharkhand, Bihar Uttar Pradesh & Delhi
- First service: 31 March 1980; 46 years ago
- Current operator: East Coast Railway

Route
- Termini: Puri (PURI); Anand Vihar Terminal (ANVT)
- Stops: 37
- Distance travelled: 1,914 km (1,189 mi)
- Average journey time: 34 hrs 50 mins
- Service frequency: Tri-weekly
- Train number: 12875 / 12876

On-board services
- Classes: AC First Class, AC 2 Tier, AC 3 Tier, Sleeper Class, General Unreserved
- Seating arrangements: Yes
- Sleeping arrangements: Yes
- Catering facilities: Available
- Observation facilities: Rake sharing with 12815/12816 Nandan Kanan Express
- Baggage facilities: No
- Other facilities: Below the seats

Technical
- Rolling stock: LHB coach
- Track gauge: 1,676 mm (5 ft 6 in) Broad Gauge
- Operating speed: 55 km/h (34 mph) average including halts.
Route map
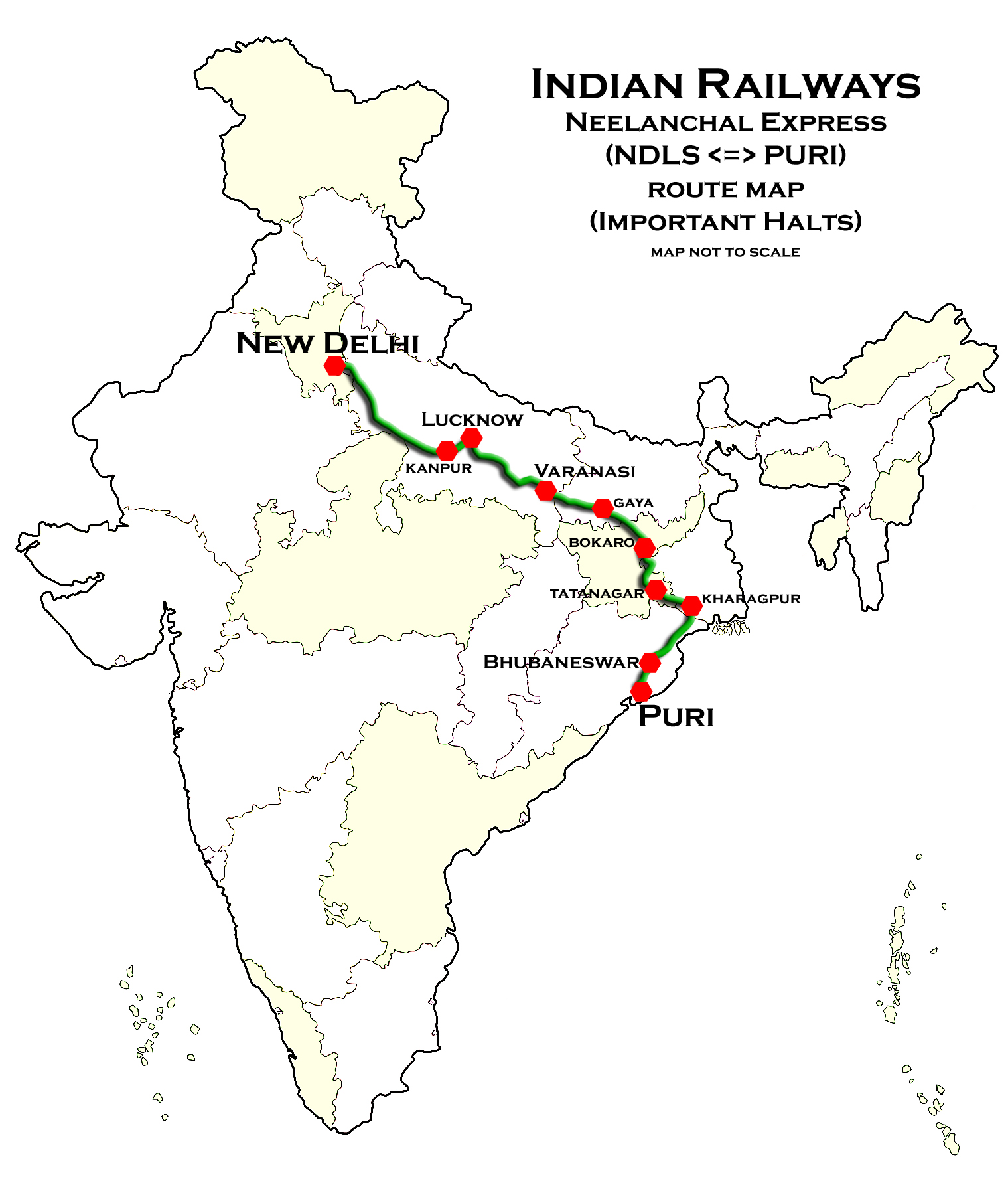

The 12875 / 12876 Neelachal Express is a express train which runs between Puri in Odisha and Anand Vihar Terminal railway station. It is one of the oldest trains that connect Puri to Anand Vihar Terminal. The main towns along the route are Bhubaneshwar, Cuttack, Bhadrak, Balasore, Hijili, Tatanagar, Bokaro Steel City, Muri, Gomoh, Gaya, Mughalsarai, Varanasi, Bhadohi, Rae Bareli, Lucknow, Unnao and Kanpur. It operates three times per week and covers a distance of 1,912 kilometres (1,188 mi) from Puri to Anand Vihar Terminal.

== Coach composition ==
The 12875/ 12876 Puri–Anand Vihar Terminal Neelachal Express presently has 1 AC First Class, 2 AC 2 tier, 6 AC 3 tier, 7 Sleeper Class, 2 Second Class seating, 1 Divyangjan Coach and 1 EOG coach. Also, it does have a pantry car.

As with most train services in India, coach composition may be amended at the discretion of Indian Railways depending on demand.

== Service ==
12875 Puri–Anand Vihar Terminal Neelachal Express covers the distance of 1914 kilometers in 24 hours 50 mins (57.20 km/h) and in 24 hours 25 mins as 12876 Anand Vihar Terminal–Puri Neelachal Express (59.48 km/h).

It takes around 34 hours and 50 minutes to cover 1,914 kilometres (1,189 mi) at an average speed of 54 kilometres per hour (34 mph) with 39 halts.

Neelachal Express was moved from New Delhi to Anand Vihar Terminal in May 2018.

== Timetable ==
From Puri to Anand Vihar Terminal – 12875. The train starts from Puri every Sunday, Tuesday & Friday.

Station code	Station name	Arrival	Departure
PURI	Puri Terminus	--	11:00
KUR	Khurda Road Jn	11:45	11:50
BBS	Bhubaneswar	12:15	12:20
CTC	Cuttack	12:50	12:55
JJKR	Jajpur Keonjhar Road	13:44	13:46
BHC	Bhadrak	14:43	14:45
SORO	Soro	15:06	15:08
BLS	Balasore	15:32	15:37
JER	Jaleswar	16:14	16:16
HIJ	Hijili Jn	17:10	17:20
GTS	Ghatsila	18:34	18:36
TATA	Tatanagar	19:22	19:30
MURI	Muri Jn	22:00	22:02
BKSC	Bokaro Steel City	23:10	23:20
CRP	Chandrapura	23:55	23:57
GMO	NSC Bose Gomoh Jn	00:20	00:25
PNME	Parasnath	00:37	00:39
KQR	Koderma Jn	01:24	01:27
GAYA	Gaya Jn	03:03	03:08
RFJ	RafiGanj	03:32	03:34
AUBR	Anugraha Narayan Road	03:55	03:57
DOS	Dehri On Sone	04:12	04:14
SSM	Sasaram	04:28	04:30
BBU	Bhabua Road	04:58	05:00
DDU	Pt DD Upadhyaya Jn	06:05	06:15
KEI	Kashi	07:01	07:03
BSB	Varanasi Jn	07:20	07:30
BOY	Bhadohi	08:08	08:10
PBH	Pratapgarh Jn	09:46	09:51
AME	Amethi	10:26	10:28
GNG	GauriGanj	10:40	10:42
RBL	Rae Bareli Jn	11:23	11:28
LKO	Lucknow Charbagh	13:25	13:35
ON	Unnao Jn	14:43	14:45
CNB	Kanpur Central	15:15	15:20
ETW	Etawah	16:48	16:50
FZD	Firozabad	17:35	17:37
HRS	Hathras Jn	18:43	18:45
ALJN	Aligarh Jn	19:08	19:10
GZB	Ghaziabad	20:38	20:40
ANVT	Anand Vihar Terminal	21:15	--

From Anand Vihar Terminal to Puri – 12876. The train starts from Anand Vihar Terminal every Sunday, Tuesday and Friday.

Station code	Station name	Arrival	Departure
ANVT	Anand Vihar Terminal	--	07:30
ALJN	Aligarh Jn	09:05	09:07
HRS	Hathras Jn	09:27	09:29
FZD	Firozabad	10:40	10:42
ETW	Etawah	11:34	11:36
CNB	Kanpur Central	13:20	13:30
ON	Unnao Jn	13:57	13:59
LKO	Lucknow Charbagh	15:00	15:10
RBL	Rae Bareli Jn	16:25	16:30
GNG	GauriGanj	17:06	17:08
AME	Amethi	17:21	17:23
PBH	Pratapgarh Jn	18:15	18:20
BOY	Bhadohi	20:11	20:13
BSB	Varanasi Jn	21:40	21:50
KEI	Kashi	22:03	22:05
DDU	Pt DD Upadhyaya Jn	22:40	22:50
BBU	Bhabua Road	23:26	23:28
SSM	Sasaram Jn	00:01	00:02
DOS	Dehri On Sone	00:16	00:18
AUBR	Anugraha Narayan Road	00:32	00:34
RFJ	RafiGanj	00:54	00:56
GAYA	Gaya Jn	01:50	01:55
KQR	Koderma	03:05	03:07
PNME	Parasnath	04:04	04:06
GMO	NSC Bose Gomoh Jn	04:25	04:30
CRP	Chandrapura	04:58	05:00
BKSC	Bokaro Steel City	05:45	05:50
MURI	Muri Jn	06:53	06:55
TATA	Tatanagar Jn	08:57	09:07
GTS	Ghatsila	09:48	09:50
HIJ	Hijili Jn	11:25	11:35
JER	Jaleswar	12:26	12:28
BLS	Balasore	13:05	13:15
SORO	Soro	13:40	13:42
BHC	Bhadrak	14:23	14:25
JJKR	Jajpur Keonjhar Road	14:56	14:58
CTC	Cuttack Jn	15:55	16:00
BBS	Bhubaneswar	16:35	16:40
KUR	Khurda Road Jn	17:05	17:10
PURI	Puri Terminus	18:15	--

== Background ==
This train is given name on The abode of Hindu deity Jagannath at Puri is known as the Nilachal or Niladri, [Nila (Blue) + Achal (Mountain)] meaning, The Blue Mountain. The Nilachal is a place of high religious significance in Hinduism and is one of the four Char Dhams. Religious teachers like Shri Ramanuja Acharya, Swami Vishnuswami visited Nilachal in the twelfth century and established a mathas. Shri Nimbarka Acharya also visited Puri, as also Guru Nanak Dev and many other Acharyas. Shri Chaitanya spent 18 years at Nilachal dhama.

== Coach composition ==
The train has modern LHB rakes with a maximum speed of 130 km/h.

- 1 AC First Class
- 2 AC II Tier
- 6 AC III Tier
- 1 Pantry Car
- 7 Sleeper Coaches
- 2 General
- 1 Divyanjan cum Guard Coach
- 1 EOG

Loco	1	2	3	4	5	6	7	8	9	10	11	12	13	14	15	16	17	18	19	20	21
	SLRD	GEN	H1	B1	B2	B3	B4	A1	A2	B5	B6	PC	S1	S2	S3	S4	S5	S6	S7	GEN	EOG

== Route and halts ==
The train runs from Puri via Khurda Road, Bhubaneswar, Cuttack, Balasore, Hijli, Tatanagar, Bokaro Steel City, Gomoh, Koderma, Gaya Junction, Mughalsarai Junction, Varanasi, Pratapgarh Junction, Rae Bareli Junction, Lucknow Charbagh, Unnao Junction, Kanpur Central, Hathras Junction, Aligarh Junction to Anand Vihar Terminal.

== Traction ==
As the route is fully electrified, Ghaziabad Loco Shed based WAP-7 electric locomotive from Puri to Anand Vihar Terminal.
