= Oudh and Rohilkhand Railway =

Indian railway

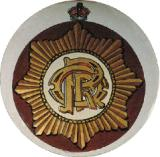
- Industry: Railways
- Predecessor: Indian Branch Railway Company
- Founded: 1872
- Defunct: 1925
- Successor: East Indian Railway Company
- Headquarters: Lucknow, India
- Area served: Northern India
- Services: Rail transport

Oudh and Rohilkhand Railway was an extensive railway network in North India, mostly north of the Ganges, starting from Benares and subsequently up to Delhi.

== History ==
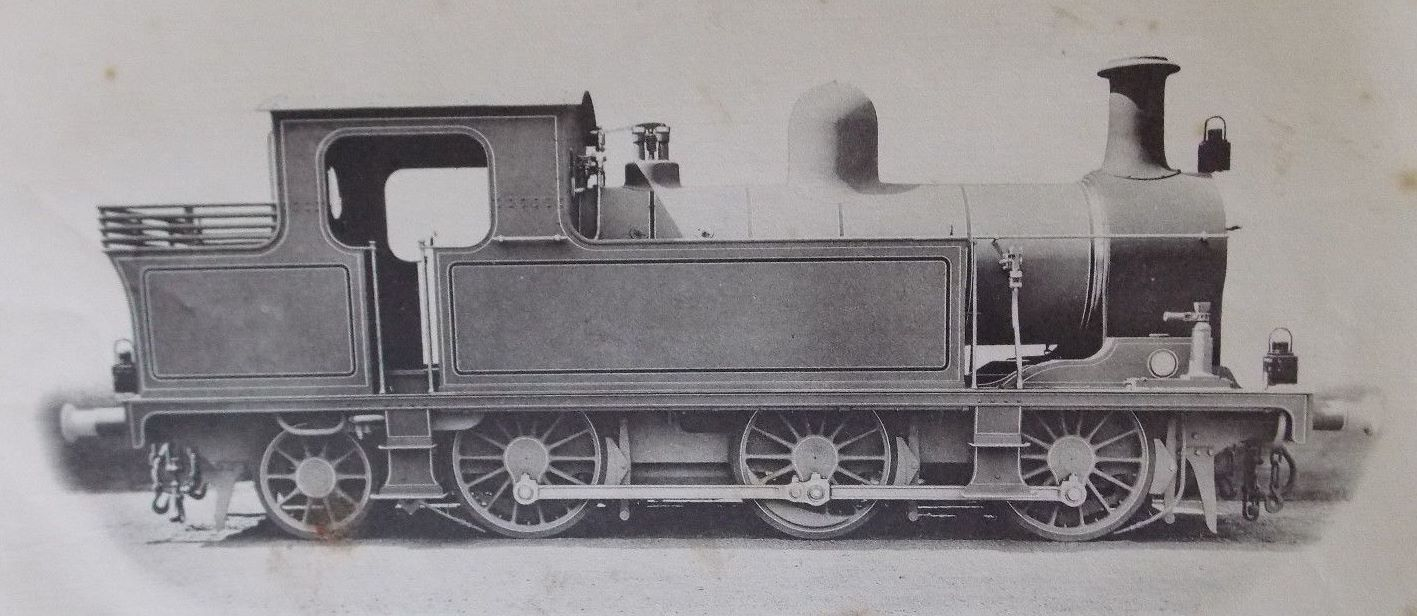
"Oude and Rohilkund. 0-6-2 Type"

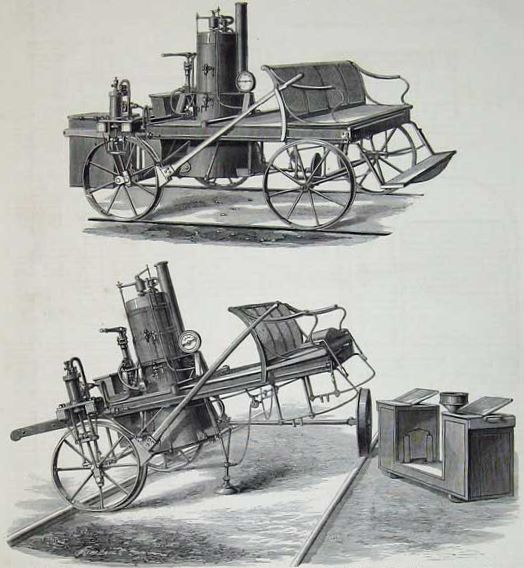
"Steam Trolly for the Oude and Rohilkund Railway, constructed by Joseph Green Cooke, Locomotive and Carriage Superintendent"

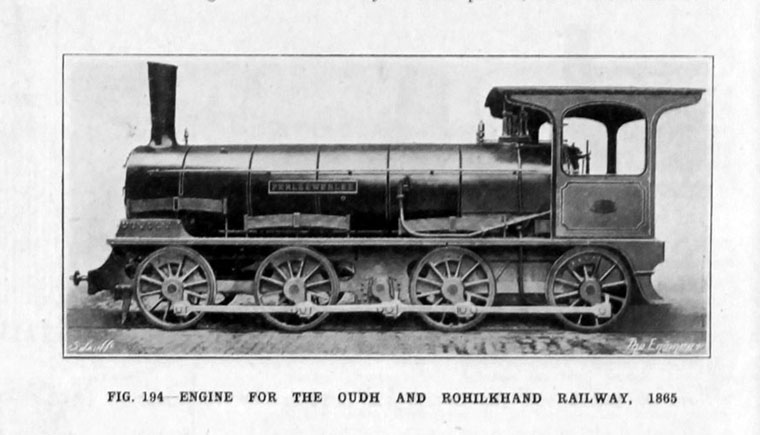
0-8-0 engine for the Oudh and Rohilkhand Railway, 1865

The Oudh and Rohilkhand Railway was formed in 1872 with the assets of the Indian Branch Railway Company and the government guarantee. It had its headquarters in Lucknow. It built lines from Lucknow to Hardoi, Lucknow to Barabanki and Moradabad to Chandausi in 1872 and extended the last to Bareilly in 1873 It built a line from Varanasi to Lucknow in 1874, with an extension to Fyzabad known as Fyzabad Loop.

The 4 miles long Broad gauge line from Burhwal to Bahramghat was opened on 1 April 1872, as part of the Bahramghat branch of the Oudh and Rohilkhand Railway. the line got closed around 1943. The 17 miles long Burwhal-Barabanki metre gauge line was opened 1 April 1872 as part of the Bahramghat branch of the Oudh and Rohilkhand Railway. Upon conversion to mixed gauge, the metre gauge track formed part of the Cawnpore-Burhwal Railway, which was managed as part of the Oudh and Rohilkhand Railway.

The Oudh and Rohilkhand Railway was merged into the East Indian Railway on 1 July 1925 but this section of the Cawnpore-Burhwal Railway was worked by the Bengal and North Western Railway and was transferred to the Oudh and Tirhut Railway on 1 January 1943. The 2-mile-long metre gauge line from Benares Cant. to Benares City was opened between 15 March and 1 April 1899 as the Benares City branch of the Oudh and Rohilkhand Railway. The Oudh and Rohilkhand Railway was absorbed by the East Indian Railway on 1 July 1925 but this line was worked by the Bengal and North Western Railway and its successors from opening and was transferred to the North Eastern Railway on 27 February 1953.

The Oudh and Rohilkhand Railway built the Dufferin Bridge over the Ganges in 1883 with Frederick Thomas Granville Walton as Chief Engineer, and its line was connected to East Indian Railway Company’s line at Mughalsarai. It extended its main line from Moradabad to Saharanpur in 1881-86 and a branch line was opened from Laksar to Haridwar in 1883. The Lucknow-Rae Bareilly extension was completed in 1893.

The main line of Oudh and Rohilkhand Railway used to run from Varanasi to Saharanpur via Lucknow, Hardoi Bareilly, Chandausi and Moradabad. With the opening of the Bareilly-Moradabad link via Rampur in 1894, the main line distance was shortened and the route via Chandausi came to be known as Chandausi chord. A branch line linked it to Aligarh. The Ghaziabad-Moradabad link was established in 1898. The Varanasi-Lucknow link via Rae Bareilly shortened the main line further. In 1888, the Government of India took over the Oudh and Rohilkhand Railway making it a state railway. In 1925, it was merged with the East Indian Railway Company.

System mileage was 1,910 km (1,187 mi) of 5 ft 6 in (1,676 mm) broad gauge 129 km (80 mi) of 1,000 mm (3 ft 3 3/8 in) wide metre gauge.

== Locomotives ==
By the end of 1877 the company owned 88 steam locomotives, 331 coaches and 2244 goods wagons.

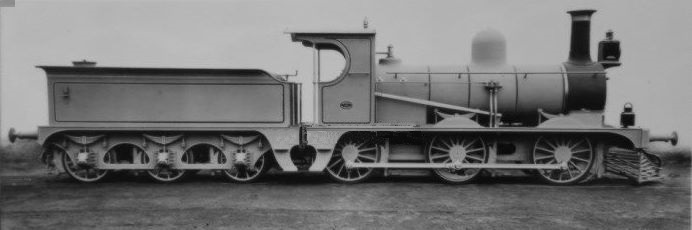
Steam locomotive No 11, 0-6-0

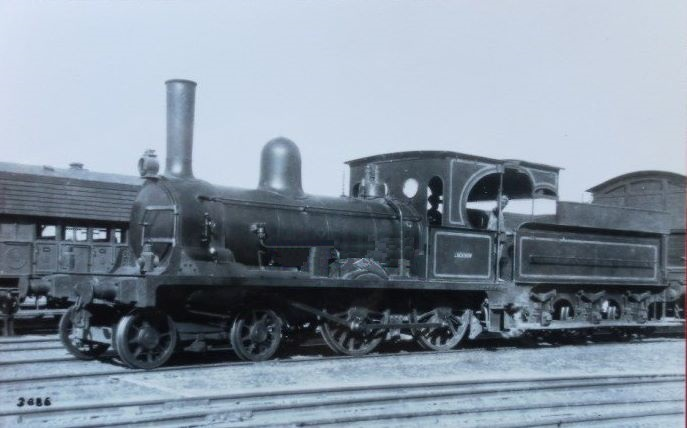
Steam locomotive 4-4-0 named 'Lucknow'

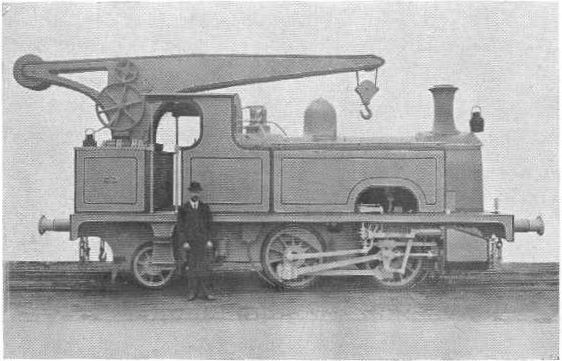
The crane could lift and skew a load of 6 t at a radius of 14 ft (4,25 m)

== Conversion to broad gauge ==
The railway lines were converted to 1,676 mm (5 ft 6 in) broad gauge in 2017.
