= Udyognagri Express =

Train in India

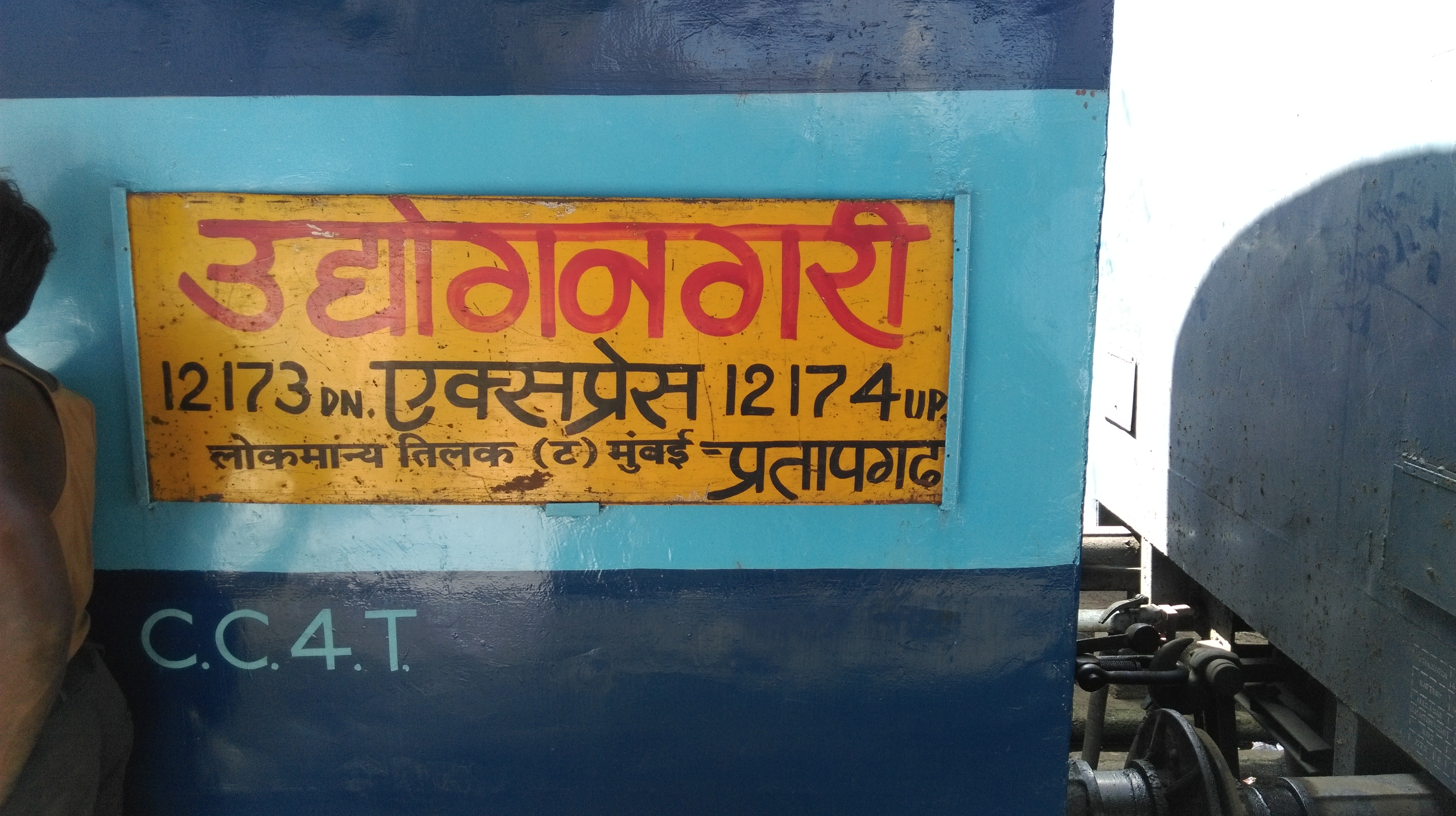
- Udyognagri Express train board.

Overview
- Service type: Superfast Express
- First service: 2009; 17 years ago
- Current operator: Central Railway

Route
- Termini: Mumbai LTT; Pratapgarh
- Stops: 11
- Distance travelled: 1,585 km (985 mi)
- Average journey time: 27 hours 30 mins
- Service frequency: Bi-weekly.
- Train number: 12173 / 12174

On-board services
- Classes: AC 2 tier, AC 3 tier, Sleeper Class, General Unreserved
- Seating arrangements: Yes
- Sleeping arrangements: Yes
- Catering facilities: Available
- Observation facilities: Large windows
- Baggage facilities: No
- Other facilities: Below the seats

Technical
- Rolling stock: LHB coach
- Track gauge: 1,676 mm (5 ft 6 in)
- Operating speed: 110 km/h (68 mph) maximum, 58 km/h (36 mph) average including halts
Route map
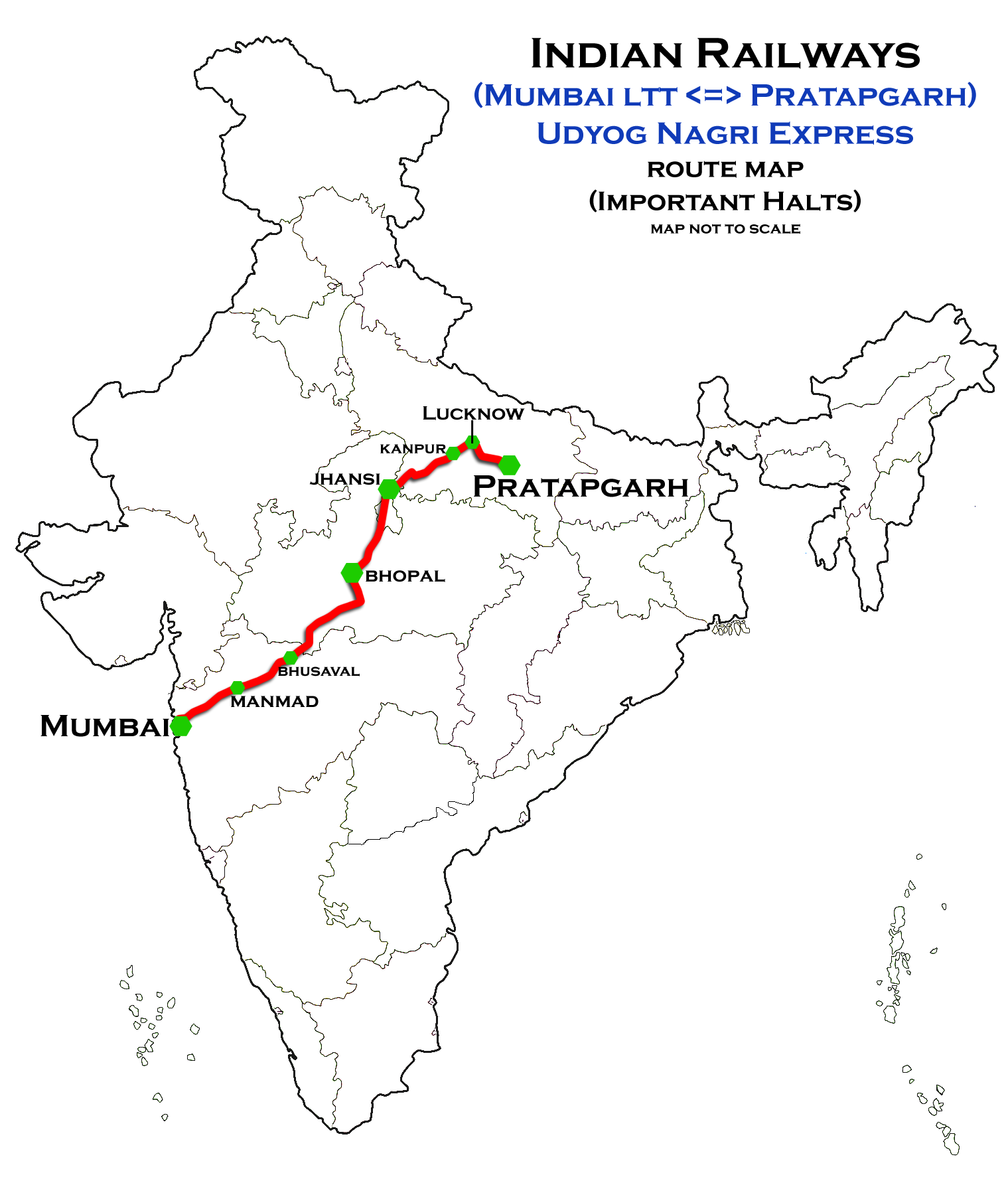

The 12173 / 12174 Udyognagri Express is a Superfast Express train belonging to Indian Railways – Central Railway zone that runs between Lokmanya Tilak Terminus and Maa Belha Devi Dham Pratapgarh Jn. in India.

It operates as train number 12173 from Lokmanya Tilak Terminus to Pratapgarh and as train number 12174 in the reverse direction, serving the states of Maharashtra, Madhya Pradesh and Uttar Pradesh.

The name Udyognagri means Industrial City (initially this train was introduced between Mumbai and industrial and commercial capital of Uttar Pradesh, Kanpur) .

== Coaches ==
The 12173 / 74 Lokmanya Tilak Terminus– Maa Belha Devi Dham Pratapgarh Jn. Udyognagri Express has 1 AC 2 tier, 3 AC 3 tier, 12 Sleeper Class, 4 General Unreserved and 2 SLR (Seating cum Luggage Rake) Coaches. In addition, it carries a pantry car .

As is customary with most train services in India, coach composition may be amended at the discretion of Indian Railways depending on demand.

== Service ==
The 12173 Lokmanya Tilak Terminus– Maa Belha Devi Dham Pratapgarh Jn. Udyognagri Express covers the distance of 1,585 km (985 mi) in 26 hours 30 mins (59.81 km/h) and in 28 hours 15 mins as 12174 Maa Belha Devi Dham Pratapgarh Jn. –Lokmanya Tilak Terminus Udyognagri Express (56.11 km/h).

As the average speed of the train is above 55 km/h (34 mph), as per Indian Railways rules, its fare includes a superfast surcharge.

== Routing ==
The 12173 / 74 Lokmanya Tilak Terminus–Maa Belha Devi Dham Pratapgarh Jn. Udyognagri Express runs from Lokmanya Tilak Terminus via Kalyan Junction, Nasik Road, Bhusaval Junction, Bhopal Junction, Jhansi Junction, Kanpur Central, Lucknow NR, Rae Bareli Junction to Maa Belha Devi Dham Pratapgarh Jn.

| Udyog Nagri Express | | 12173 Up | | 12174 Down | |
|---|---|---|---|---|---|
| Station name | Code | ARR | DEP | ARR | DEP |
| Lokmanya Tilak Terminus | LTT | - | 16:25 | 06:00 | - |
| Thane | TNA | 16:43 | 16:45 | 05:18 | 05:20 |
| Kalyan Jn | KYN | 17:07 | 17:10 | 04:52 | 04:55 |
| Nashik Road | NK | 19:33 | 19:35 | 02:08 | 02:10 |
| Bhusaval Jn | BSL | 22:30 | 22:40 | 22:45 | 22:55 |
| Bhopal Jn | BPL | 04:55 | 05:05 | 16:25 | 16:35 |
| Jhansi Jn | JHS | 09:10 | 09:25 | 11:45 | 12:00 |
| Orai | ORAI | 11:05 | 11:07 | 09:48 | 09:50 |
| Kanpur Central | CNB | 13:30 | 13:35 | 07:55 | 08:00 |
| Lucknow Charbagh NR | LKO | 14:55 | 15:05 | 05:40 | 05:50 |
| Rae Bareli Jn | RBL | 16:20 | 16:25 | 03:30 | 03:32 |
| Amethi | AME | 17:34 | 17:36 | 02:33 | 02:35 |
| Maa Belha Devi Dham Pratapgarh Jn | MBDP | 18:55 | - | - | 01:50 |

== Traction ==
As sections is fully electrified, a Kalyan based WAP-7 hauled the train from Lokmanya Tilak Terminus until Maa Belha Devi Dham Pratapgarh Jn.

== Operation ==
12173 Lokmanya Tilak Terminus– Maa Belha Devi Dham Pratapgarh Jn. Udyognagri Express runs from Lokmanya Tilak Terminus every Tuesday and Sunday at 04:25 PM, reaching Maa Belha Devi Dham Pratapgarh Jn. the next day at 06:55 PM

12174 Maa Belha Devi Dham Pratapgarh Jn.–Lokmanya Tilak Terminus Udyognagri Express runs from Maa Belha Devi Dham Pratapgarh Jn. every Tuesday and Thursday at 01:50 AM, reaching Lokmanya Tilak Terminus at 06:00 AM, the next day.
