= Indian Branch Railway Company =

Railway company in India

- Industry: Railways
- Founded: 1862
- Defunct: Around 1872
- Successor: Oudh and Rohilkhand Railway; Nalhati State Railway
- Headquarters: India
- Area served: Eastern and Northern India
- Services: Rail transport

The Indian Branch Railway Company was formed in 1862 to build short branch and feeder lines. It received no guarantee but was offered a 20-year subsidy. In the 1850s, it secured a guaranteed return.

In 1863, it built the 4 ft (1,219 mm) wide narrow gauge railway line between Azimganj and Nalhati. The Azimgan–Nalhati line was taken over by the Government in 1872, as Nalhati State Railway. In 1867, it opened the 1,000 mm (3 ft 3 3/8 in) wide metre gauge Kanpur–Lucknow branch line.

It established a railway workshop at Alambagh in 1865 and another at Charbagh in 1867.

Around 1872, it was merged into Oudh and Rohilkhand Railway. Oudh and Rohilkhand Railway was subsequently merged with East Indian Railway Company in 1925.

== Conversion to broad gauge ==
The railway lines were converted to 1,676 mm (5 ft 6 in) broad gauge in 2017.
