= Yesvantpur–Lucknow Superfast Express (via Kacheguda) =

Train in India

Overview
- Service type: Superfast Express
- First service: 1 March 2014; 12 years ago
- Current operator: South Western Railway

Route
- Termini: Yesvantpur Junction (YPR); Lucknow Charbagh (LKO)
- Stops: 28
- Distance travelled: 2,335 km (1,451 mi)
- Average journey time: 42 hrs 30 mins
- Service frequency: Weekly
- Train number: 22683 / 22684

On-board services
- Classes: AC 2 tier, AC 3 tier, Sleeper class, General Unreserved
- Seating arrangements: Yes
- Sleeping arrangements: Yes
- Catering facilities: On-board catering, E-catering
- Observation facilities: Large windows
- Baggage facilities: No
- Other facilities: Below the seats

Technical
- Rolling stock: LHB coach
- Track gauge: 1,676 mm (5 ft 6 in)
- Operating speed: 54 km/h (34 mph) average including halts.
Route map
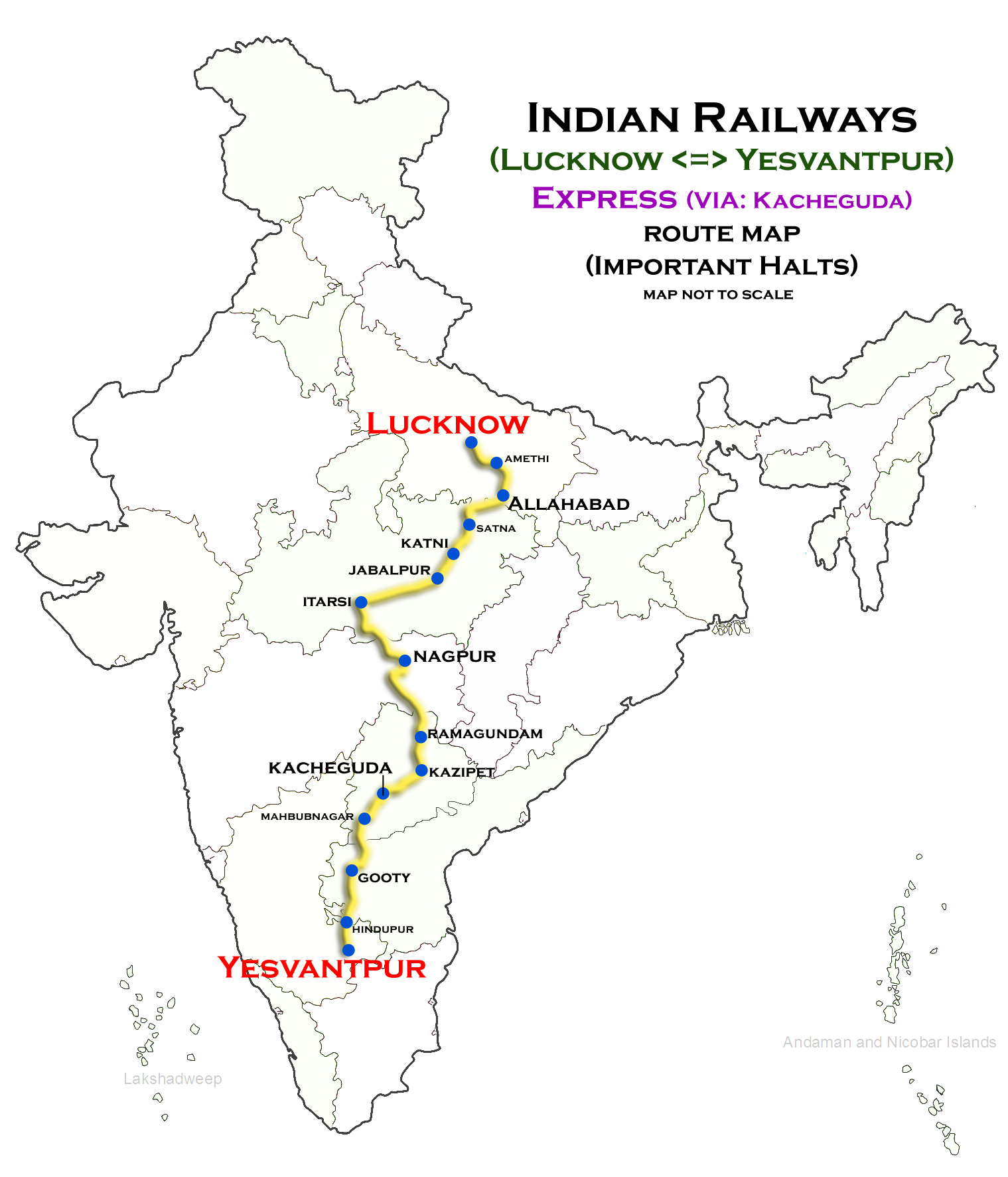

The 22683 / 22684 Yesvantpur–Lucknow Superfast Express (via Kacheguda) is an Express train belonging to Indian Railways South Western Railway zone that runs between Yesvantpur Junction and Lucknow Charbagh in India.

It operates as train number 22641from Yesvantpur Junction to Lucknow Charbagh and as train number 22684 in the reverse direction, serving the states of Karnataka, Andhra Pradesh, Telangana, Maharashtra, Madhya Pradesh and Uttar Pradesh.
