= Janghai =

Village in Uttar Pradesh, India

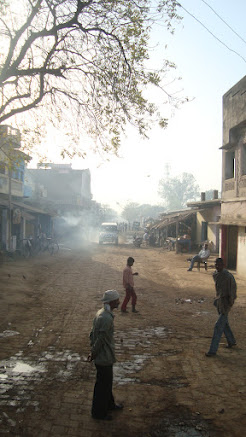
- Interactive map of Janghai
- Coordinates: 25°33′N 82°19′E

Janghai is a market town and Gram Panchayat in the Prayagraj district of Uttar Pradesh, India. It is 226 kilometres southeast of the state capital, Lucknow, and 24 kilometres from Handia Tehsil. As of 2022, Janghai has a population of approximately 29,000.

The town spans two districts, which presents challenges for its development. Many local leaders advocate for Janghai to be upgraded to a Nagar Panchayat.

== Climate ==
Janghai has a humid subtropical climate, characteristic of cities in north-central India. The town experiences three seasons: a hot, dry summer, a cool, dry winter, and a warm, humid monsoon season.

The summer season lasts from April to June with maximum temperatures ranging from 40 °C (104 °F) to 45 °C (113 °F). The monsoon season begins in early July and lasts until September. Winter spans from December to February, with temperatures rarely dropping below freezing. Maximum winter temperatures are around 35 °C (95 °F), while minimum temperatures can fall to about 10 °C (50 °F). Janghai experiences heavy fog in January, which can cause traffic and travel disruptions.

The lowest temperature recorded in Janghai was −2 °C (28 °F), while the highest recorded temperature was 48 °C (118 °F).

== Transport ==
=== Rail ===
Janghai is served by Janghai Junction Railway Station, which operates under the Northern Railway zone of Indian Railways. The station is well connected to major cities across India, and is the third largest railway station in Jaunpur district. It features five platforms and parking facilities.

Janghai's network links it to Jafarabad and Jaunpur to the north, Phaphamau and Prayagraj to the south, Varanasi to the east, and Partapgarh to the west.

==== Major trains ====
- Ratnagiri Superfast Express
- Kamayani Express
- Godaan Express
- Kashi Vishwanath Express
- Poorva Express
- Bundelkhand Express
- Sarnath Express

=== Road ===
Buses and jeeps are the primary modes of transportation in Janghai. The Janghai Bus Depot, located opposite the Janghai Railway Station, serves as a key transit point. Janghai is connected to Lucknow, Varanasi, Prayagraj and other cities such as Azamgarh, Mirzapur, Bhadohi, Sultanpur, and Ghazipur.

One of the main routes is Janghai to Handia, a 26-kilometre-long (16 mi) road. Stops along the route include: Janghai Bazar, Bypass, Chuka Mode, Champapur, Chanethu, Annuwa, Belkha, Vrindavan, Vari, Madwa, Sirsa, Katahara, Ciady, Handia.

Janghai is connected to NH731B via Machhalishahar, and Janghai Barna links Janghai to Prayagraj via Phoolpur, Sahson, and Andawa. Additionally, PDA buses connect Janghai to Prayagraj via Vari and Pratappur.

=== Air ===
Lal Bahadur Shastri Airport is 56 kilometres away. Prayagraj Airport is approximately 60 kilometres away. Domestic and international flights are accessible.
