= Malda Town–Anand Vihar Weekly Express =

Train in India

Malda Town–Anand Vihar Terminal Weekly Express
Overview
- Service type: Express
- Locale: West Bengal, Bihar, Uttar Pradesh & Delhi
- First service: 9 January 2015; 10 years ago
- Current operator(s): Eastern Railway

Route
- Termini: Malda Town (MLDT); Anand Vihar Terminal (ANVT)
- Stops: 23
- Distance travelled: 1,412 km (877 mi)
- Average journey time: 28 hrs 55 mins
- Service frequency: Weekly
- Train number(s): 13429 / 13430

On-board services
- Class(es): AC 2 Tier, AC 3 Tier, Sleeper Class, General Unreserved
- Seating arrangements: Yes
- Sleeping arrangements: Yes
- Catering facilities: On-board catering, E-catering
- Observation facilities: Large windows
- Baggage facilities: Available
- Other facilities: Below the seats

Technical
- Rolling stock: LHB coach
- Track gauge: 1,676 mm (5 ft 6 in)
- Operating speed: 49 km/h (30 mph) average including halts.

The 13429 / 13430 Malda Town–Anand Vihar Terminal Weekly Express is the express, as well as the like other normal Express trains. It is the newer one train.

The Malda Town–Anand Vihar Weekly Express left Malda Town railway station for Anand Vihar Terminal railway station, to cover a distance of 1,412 km (877 mi) km in 29 hours 30 mins. It had an 1 AC 2 Tier, 2 AC 3-tier and 6 3-Tier Sleeper. It is hauled by Indian locomotive class WAP-4.Howrah.

== History ==
It was inaugurated at Tuesday 9 January 2015.

== Destinations ==
The train is an important link between Malda Town to New Delhi. It runs near some of the most holy sites in India.

=== Timing ===
- 13429 Malda Town–Anand Vihar Terminal Weekly Express leaves Malda Town railway station on a one-day-in-a-week basis at 09:05 hrs IST and reaches Anand Vihar Terminal railway station at 14:35 hrs IST the 2nd day.
- 13430 Anand Vihar Terminal–Malda Town Weekly Express leaves Anand Vihar Terminal railway station on one days in a weekly basis at 17:10 hrs IST and reaches Malda Town railway station at 23:50 hrs IST the 2nd day.

On this route, the train covers a distance of 1,412 km (877 mi) in 29 hrs 30 mins.

== Coach composition ==
Loco	1	2	3	4	5	6	7	8	9	10	11	12	13	14	15	16	17
	EoG	GS	GN	GN	B2	B1	A1	S1	S2	S3	S4	S5	S6	GN	GN	GN	SLR

=== Trivia ===
Malda Town–Anand Vihar Weekly Express has One AC 2-Tier, Two AC 3-Tier, Six Sleeper Class, Six General Unreserved, One SLR and One EoG.

== See also ==
- Express trains in India
