= Hardoi railway station =

Railway station in Uttar Pradesh, India

Hardoi Junction
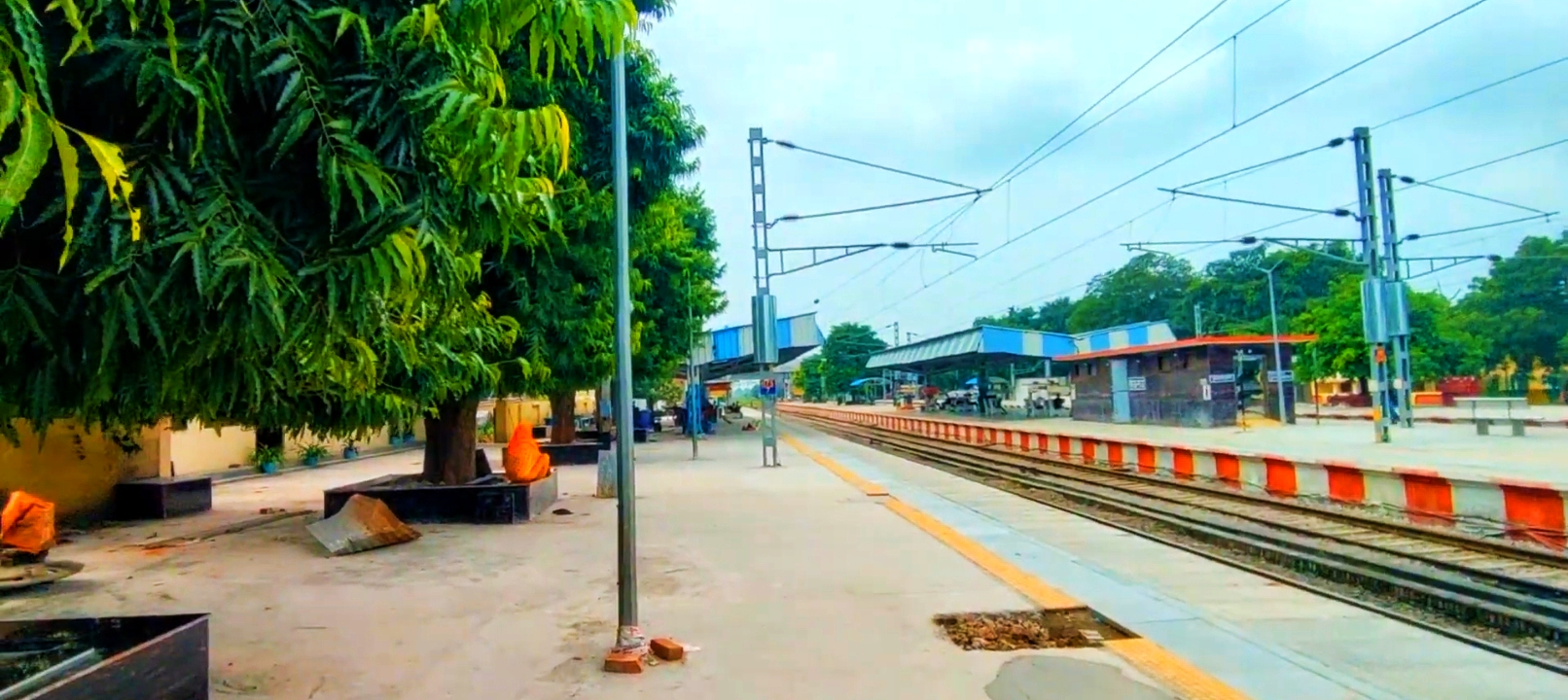
- Hardoi Junction

General information
- Location: Hardoi, Uttar Pradesh; India
- Coordinates: 27.240°N 80.850°E
- Elevation: 140.61 m (461.3 ft)
- System: Indian Railways station
- Owner: Indian Railways
- Operator: Northern Railway
- Line: Lucknow-Moradabad-Delhi Main Line Hardoi-Sandi-Gurshaiganj Branch Line (Proposed) Naimishrya-Hardoi-Farukkabad Branch Line (Proposed)
- Platforms: 5 Currently | Will Increase
- Tracks: 5
- Connections: Auto stand

Construction
- Structure type: At grade
- Parking: Yes
- Accessible: 24 Hours

Other information
- Status: Functioning
- Station code: HRI
- Zone(s): Northern Railway
- Division(s): Moradabad

History
- Rebuilt: 2026
- Former names: Hardoi Junction

Passengers
- 29000 Daily
Location
- Location within India Location within Uttar Pradesh

Hardoi Junction (station code HRI) is a main railway station in Hardoi district in the Indian state of Uttar Pradesh.

Hardoi Railway Station Has Over 70 trains like, Passengers, Mid SuperFast Train and some Premium Trains.

Hardoi has not got its First Vande or Amrit Bharat Express till now.

Some Premium Trains Like Lucknow Mail, Chandigarh-Lucknow Superfast, Rajya Rani Express, etc.
