= Varanasi–Dehradun Express =

Train in India

Varanasi Dehradun Janta Express
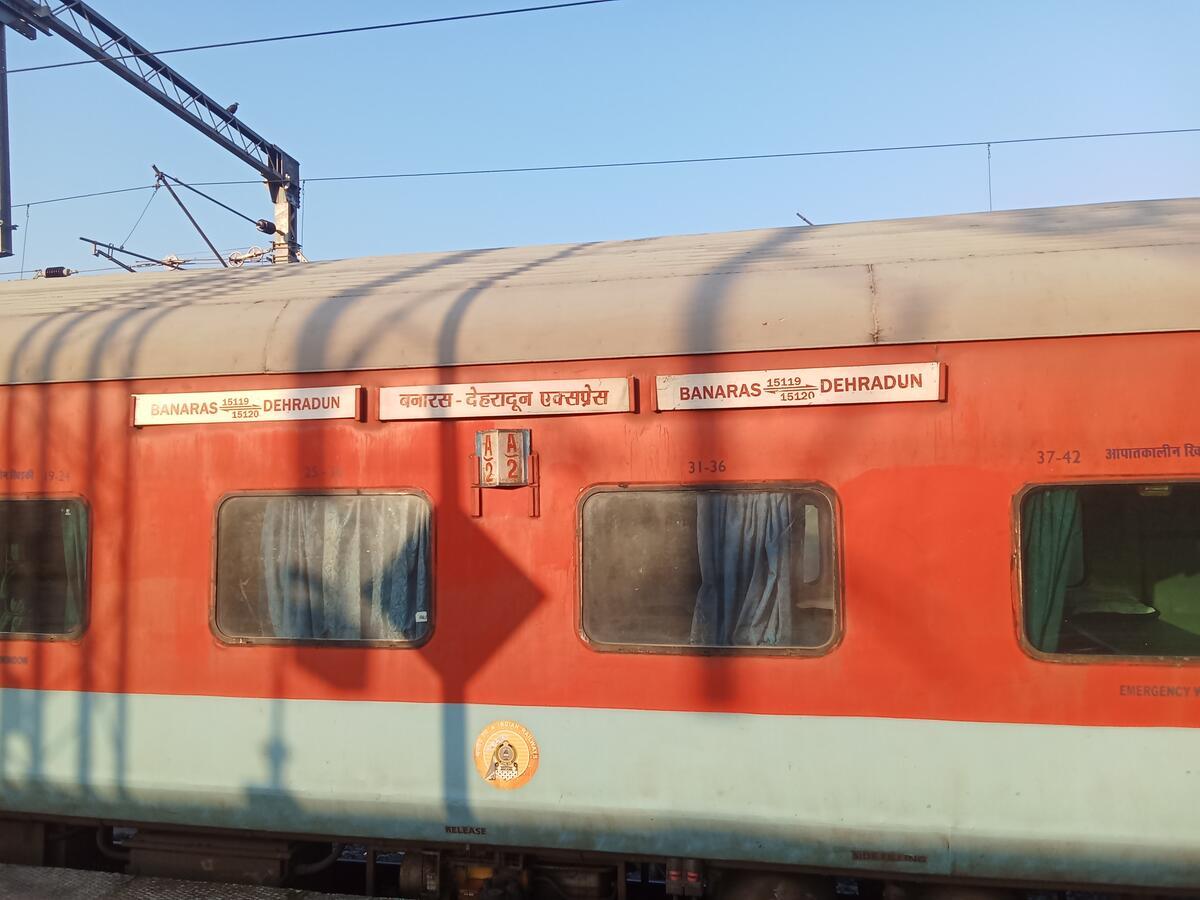

Overview
- Service type: Express
- Locale: Uttar Pradesh and Uttarakhand
- Current operator: Northern Railways

Route
- Termini: Varanasi Junction; Dehradun
- Stops: 46 as 14265 Varanasi–Dehradun Janta Express; 48 as 14266 Dehradun–Varanasi Janta Express
- Distance travelled: 846 km (526 mi)
- Average journey time: 22 hours 05 minutes as 14265 Varanasi–Dehradun Express; 21 hours 25 minutes as 14266 Dehradun–Varanasi Express
- Service frequency: Daily
- Train number: 15119 / 15120

On-board services
- Classes: AC 2 tier, AC 3 tier, Sleeper Class, Unreserved/General
- Seating arrangements: Yes
- Sleeping arrangements: Yes
- Catering facilities: No pantry car attached
- Observation facilities: No rake sharing

Technical
- Rolling stock: Standard Indian Railways LHB coach
- Track gauge: 1,676 mm (5 ft 6 in)
- Operating speed: 110 km/h (68 mph) maximum 38.90 km/h (24 mph), including halts
Route map
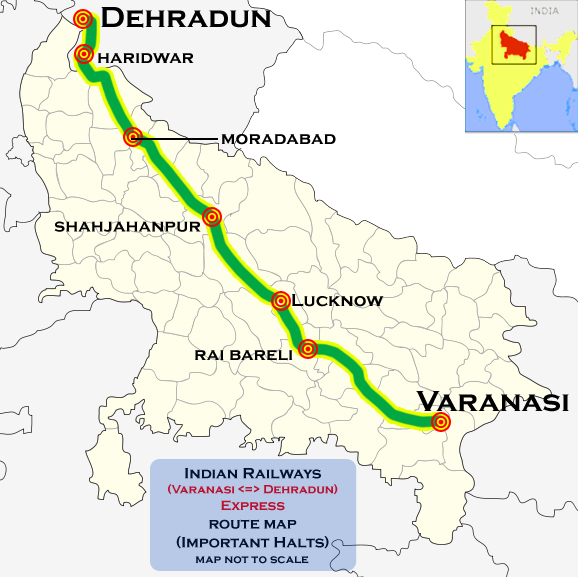

The 15119/15120 Varanasi–Dehradun Express is an express train operated by Indian Railways which belongs to Northern Railway zone that runs between Varanasi Junction and Dehradun in India.

== Service ==
Earlier the first name was Janata Express while run with ICF rakes, and since LHB coaches upgraded to this train it was rebranded as Varanasi - Dehradun Express

Schedule of 15119/15120 Varanasi–Dehradun Express
Train No.	From	To	Distance (km)	Journey Time	Average Speed
14265	Varanasi Junction (BSB)	Dehradun (DDN)	846	22h 05m	38.31 km/h
14266	Dehradun (DDN)	Varanasi Junction (BSB)	846	21h 25m	39.50 km/h

== Timetable ==
Station code	Station name	15119 – Varanasi Junction to Dehradun		Distance from source in km	Day	15120 – Dehradun to Varanasi Junction		Distance from source in km	Day
Station code	Station name	Arrival	Departure	Distance from source in km	Day	Arrival	Departure	Distance from source in km	Day
BSB	Varanasi Junction	Source	08:30	0	1	15:45	Destination	846	2
PBH	Partapgarh Junction	11:45	11:50	129	1	11:52	11:57	718	2
LKO	Lucknow	16:35	16:45	302	1	07:35	07:55	545	2
SPN	Shahjehanpur	20:07	20:12	466	1	03:10	03:15	380	2
BE	Bareilly Junction	21:12	21:17	537	1	02:00	02:05	310	2
MB	Moradabad	23:35	23:50	627	1	23:55	00:30	219	2
PBH	Najibabad	01:35	01:40	726	2	22:04	22:06	121	1
LRJ	Laksar Junction	02:52	02:55	767	2	21:10	21:13	79	1
HW	Haridwar Junction	03:45	04:20	794	2	20:05	20:33	52	1
DDN	Dehradun	06:35	Destination	846	2	Source	18:20	0	1

== Coaches ==
Coach Composition of 15119/15120 Varanasi–Dehradun Express
Coach No.	Coach Type
0	Loco (L)
1	SLR
2	General (GS)
3	General (GS)
4	Sleeper (S1)
5	Sleeper (S2)
6	Sleeper (S3)
7	AC 3-Tier (M1)
8	AC 3-Tier (M2)
9	AC 2-Tier (B1)
10	AC 2-Tier (B2)
11	AC First Class (A1)
12	AC First Class (A2)
13	First Class (H1)
14	General (GS)
15	General (GS)
16	End-on Generator (EOG)

Legend:

- L – Locomotive
- SLR – Seating cum Luggage Rake
- GS – General Unreserved
- S – Sleeper Class
- M – AC 3-Tier
- B – AC 2-Tier
- A – AC First Class
- H – First Class
- EOG – End-on Generator

== Train accident ==
On 20 March 2015 train number 14266 derailed in Bachhrawa near Rae Bareli at 09:10 in the morning. It was returning from Dehradun to Varanasi. Resulting one carriage of the train was crushed and flattened and As per sources 38 people died while more than 200 injured. The central government offered ₹200000 compensation for dead,₹50000 for seriously injured and ₹20000 for minor injured people. According to Indian Railways the main cause of the accident was the failure of train's braking system.

== Traction ==
earlier was WDM-3D. It is hauled by Diesel Loco Shed, Lucknow-based WAP-7 locomotive for its entire run.
