= Varanasi–Rae Bareli–Lucknow line =

Railway line in Uttar Pradesh, India

Varanasi–Rae Bareli–Lucknow Varanasi–Lucknow Grand Chord line
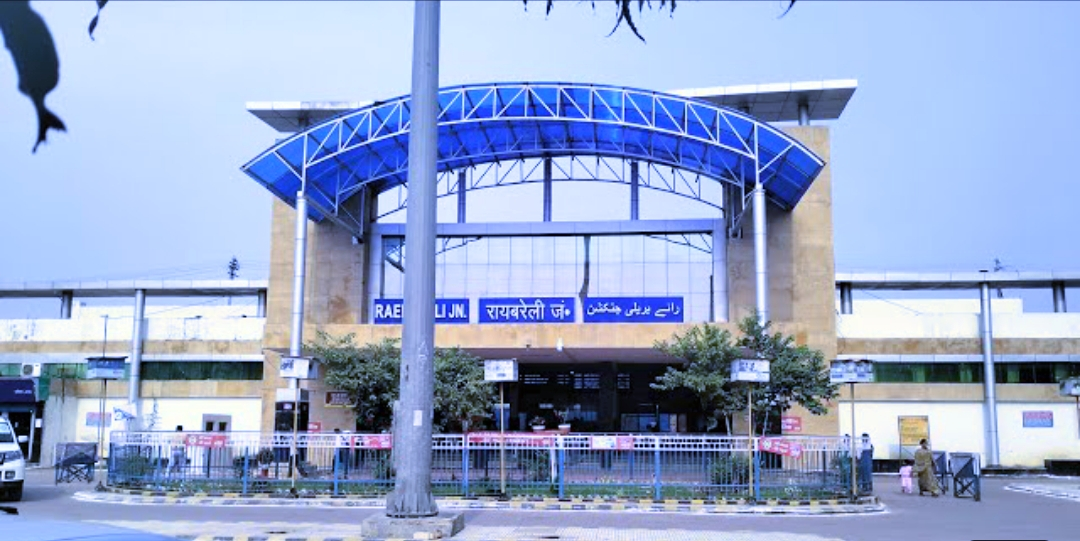
- Rae Bareli Junction lies on Varanasi–Lucknow Section

Overview
- Status: Operational
- Owner: Indian Railways
- Locale: Gangetic Plain in Uttar Pradesh
- Termini: Varanasi; Lucknow

Service
- Operator: Northern Railway for main line
- Depot: Lucknow Alambagh

History
- Opened: 1864

Technical
- Track length: 300 km (186 mi)
- Number of tracks: 2
- Track gauge: 5 ft 6 in (1,676 mm) broad gauge
- Electrification: 25 kV 50 Hz AC OHLE
- Operating speed: up to 130 km/h (80 mph) To be 160 km/h
- Highest elevation: Varanasi 82 m (269 ft); Lucknow 123 m (404 ft)

The Varanasi–Rae Bareli–Lucknow Grand Chord line (also known as Varanasi–Lucknow chord line) is a railway line connecting Varanasi and Lucknow, both in the Indian state of Uttar Pradesh. The line is under the administrative jurisdiction of Northern Railway.

== History ==
The Lucknow–Rae Bareli extension was completed in 1864 and the Varanasi–Lucknow chord line via Rae Bareli was constructed in 1864.

== Line doubling and electrification ==
As of 2013, the railways have taken up doubling of the 66 km (41 mi) Utaratia–Raebareli sector and the 60 km (37 mi) Raebareli–Amethi sector. Work is in progress for electrification of the 200 km (124 mi) Varanasi–Unchahar railway line.

== New lines ==
Railways have taken up construction of the 116 km (72 mi) Rae Bareli–Akbarganj–Faizabad new line and the 134 km (83 mi) Unchahar-Amethi-Sultanpur–Kadipur new line in 2013.

== Passenger movement ==
Varanasi and Lucknow on this line are amongst the top hundred booking stations of Indian Railway.

== Sheds, workshops and manufacturing facilities ==
Lucknow diesel loco shed or Alambagh diesel shed is home to 160+ locomotives, including WDM-2, WDM-3A, WDM-3D, WDG-3A and WDG-4 varieties. Charbagh locomotive workshops handle periodical overhaul jobs.

Banaras Locomotive Works at Varanasi initially assembled ALCO kits. Subsequently, with technology transfer from GM EMD, it produces advanced diesel locomotives with high efficiency and low maintenance costs. It produces around 240 locomotives annually.

Rail Coach Factory, Raebareli was inaugurated in 2012. It would initially produce 1,000 coaches per year and the capacity would be enhanced later.

== Railway reorganisation ==
Around 1872, the Indian Branch Railway Company was transformed into Oudh and Rohilkhand Railway. Oudh and Rohilkhand Railway was merged with East Indian Railway Company in 1925.

The Government of India took over the Bengal and North-Western Railway and merged it with the Rohilkhand and Kumaon Railway to form the Oudh and Tirhut Railway in 1943.

In 1952, Eastern Railway, Northern Railway and North Eastern Railway were formed. Eastern Railway was formed with a portion of East Indian Railway Company, east of Mughalsarai and Bengal Nagpur Railway. Northern Railway was formed with a portion of East Indian Railway Company west of Mughal Sarai, Jodhpur Railway, Bikaner Railway and Eastern Punjab Railway. North Eastern Railway was formed with Oudh and Tirhut Railway, Assam Railway and a portion of Bombay, Baroda and Central India Railway. East Central Railway was created in 1996–97. North Central Railway was formed in 2003.
