= Janghai Junction railway station =

Railway station in Uttar Pradesh, India

Janghai Junction

General information
- Location: [[Bhadohi], Uttar Pradesh, India; India
- Coordinates: 25.550225°N 82.310107°E
- Elevation: 92 metres (302 ft)
- Owner: Indian Railways
- Operator: Northern Railways
- Lines: Janghai - Prayagraj Line; Janghai - Jaunpur Line; Varanasi-Janghai-Rae Bareli-Lucknow line
- Platforms: 5
- Tracks: 8

Construction
- Structure type: Standard
- Parking: Available
- Accessible: Yes

Other information
- Status: Functioning
- Station code: JNH
- Zone(s): Northern Railway zone
- Division(s): Lucknow NR

History
- Opened: 1864

Passengers
- More than 15,000 per day

Services
Location
- Location within Uttar Pradesh Location within India

Janghai Junction railway station is a NSG-3 category railway station located in Janghai village, Jaunpur District, Uttar Pradesh. It is a vital railway junction in Jaunpur district. It falls under the Northern Railway zone's Lucknow railway division. The station code is "JNH". The station consisted of 3 Platforms, but 2 more were built and now the station has 5 Platforms.

== Connectivity ==
The station caters to about 66 trains. It is connected to major cities such as Mumbai, New Delhi, Lucknow, Ayodhya, Varanasi, Mau, Ghazipur, Howrah, Pratapgarh, Prayagraj, Gorakhpur, Dehradun, Amritsar, Chhapra, Ballia, Gwalior, Jodhpur, Azamgarh, Jaunpur, Patna and more.

There are several major and significant trains which have stoppages on Janghai Junction Railway Station, a list of a few such trains is given below :

22103/22104 : Ayodhya Cantt. – Mumbai LTT Superfast Express

12381/12382 : Poorva SF Express.

20941/20942 : Bandra Terminus – Ghazipur City Weekly Express

11055/11056 : Godaan Express

1107/1108 : Bundelkhand Express
