= Pratapgarh Junction railway station =

Railway station in Uttar Pradesh, India

Pratapgarh Junction

General information
- Other names: Maa Belha Devi Dham Pratapgarh Junction (official)
- Location: Junction Point, Pratapgarh, Uttar Pradesh; India
- Coordinates: 25.9129°N 82.0013°E
- Elevation: 97 metres (318 ft)
- System: Indian Railways station
- Owner: Ministry of Railways (India)
- Operator: Indian Railways
- Lines: Varanasi–Rae Bareli–Lucknow line; Ayodhya–Sultanpur–Pratapgarh–Prayagraj line
- Platforms: 5
- Tracks: 9
- Connections: Auto stand

Construction
- Structure type: At grade
- Parking: Available
- Cycle facilities: Available

Other information
- Status: Functioning
- Station code: MBDP
- Zone(s): Northern Railway
- Division(s): Lucknow NR

History
- Opened: 1864
- Rebuilt: Remodelled in 2024-26
- Former names: Pratapgarh Junction

Passengers
- 40000

Services
WiFi, Clean Drinking Water, Parking, Waiting Rooms
Location
- Location within India Location within Uttar Pradesh

Pratapgarh Junction, officially Maa Belha Devi Dham Pratapgarh Junction, is a main railway station in Pratapgarh district, Uttar Pradesh. Its code is MBDP (old code PBH). It serves Pratapgarh city. The station consists of five platforms.

The station is strategically situated on the Prayagraj–Ayodhya and Varanasi–Lucknow railway route. The section is fully electrified.

Many significant passenger amenity projects have been approved for the enhancement of Pratapgarh railway station. Key components include the improvement of the circulating area, the replacement of the old foot overbridge (FOB), the provision of a lounge for passengers, the extension, raising, and enhancement of platforms, platform resurfacing, renovation of waiting rooms, replacement of water hydrants on platform No. 3, the provision of a full-length washing line, renovation of the pay-and-use toilets, the installation of a 10 kWp solar panel, and LED lights in the station building, circulating area, and on the platforms, all at an approximate cost of ₹8.75 crore.

Access to the platforms is provided by two foot overbridges. However, both the platforms and foot overbridges are unsuitable for individuals with disabilities and do not comply with the directives of the Government of India, Ministry of Social Justice and Empowerment. The absence of lifts, an escalator, and an underpass makes it challenging for individuals to access other platforms.

== Trains ==
- Udyog Nagri Express- Pratapgarh to LTT Mumbai
- Pratapgarh–Kanpur Intercity Express
- Varanasi–Pratapgarh Passenger
- Pratapgarh–Lucknow DEMU
- Pratapgarh–Lucknow Passenger
- Padmavat Express- Pratapgarh to Delhi
- Howrah - Amritsar (Punjab) Mail Express
- Bhopal–Pratapgarh Superfast Express
- Jaunpur–Raebareli Express
- Dehradun Janta Express- Banaras to Dehradun
- Archana Superfast Express- Jammu Tavi to Patna Jn
- Kashi Vishwanath Express-Banaras to New Delhi
- Banaras-Lucknow Intercity Express
- Nautanwa-Durg Express
- Manwar Sangam Express- Prayagraj Sangam to Basti
- Saryu Express- Prayagraj Sangam to Mankapur
- Agra-Kolkata Express
- Yashwantpur Superfast Express- Lucknow to Yashwantpur(Bangalore)
- Ekatmata Express- Lucknow to Pt. Deen Dayal Upadhyay Junction(Mugalsarai)
- Prayagraj Sangam-Lucknow Passenger
- Prayagraj Sangam-Bareilly Express
- Antyodaya Express- Chapra to Lokmanya Tilak Terminus]]
- Prayagraj Sangam-Ayodhya Cantt Passenger
- New Delhi- Malda Town Express
- Gareeb Rath Express- Varanasi to Anand Vihar
- Neelanchal Superfast Express- Puri to Anand Vihar
- Marudhar Express- Jodhpur to Varanasi
- Yog Nagri Rishikesh Haridwar Express- Prayagraj Sangam to Rishikesh
- Bikaner Superfast Express- Howrah to Bikaner
- Lal Kuan Superfast Express- Howrah to Lal Kuan junction
- Saket Express- Ayodhya Cantt to LTT Mumbai]]
