= Kaifiyat Express =

Train in India

Kaifiyaat Express
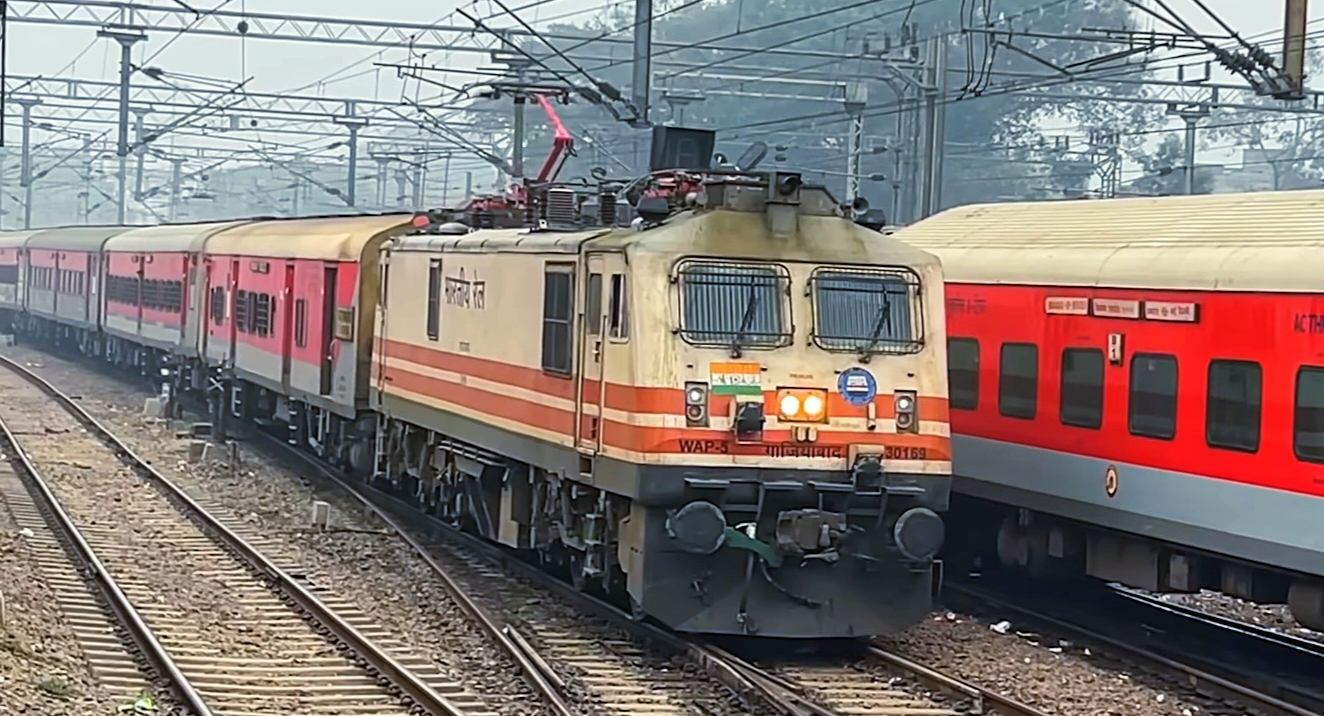
- Kaifiyaat Express Taking Departure At Kanpur Central

Overview
- Service type: Superfast
- Locale: Delhi & Uttar Pradesh
- First service: 28 September 2003; 22 years ago
- Current operator: Northern Railway

Route
- Termini: Old Delhi (DLI); Azamgarh (AMH)
- Stops: 18
- Distance travelled: 803 km (499 mi)
- Average journey time: 14 hours 20 minutes
- Service frequency: Daily
- Train number: 12225 / 12226

On-board services
- Classes: AC First Class, AC 2 Tier, AC 3 Tier, Sleeper Class, General Unreserved
- Seating arrangements: Yes
- Sleeping arrangements: Yes
- Catering facilities: On-board catering, E-catering
- Observation facilities: Large windows
- Baggage facilities: Below the seats
- Other facilities: Below the seats

Technical
- Rolling stock: LHB coach
- Track gauge: 1,676 mm (5 ft 6 in)
- Operating speed: 55 km/h (34 mph) average including halts.

The 12225 / 12226 Kaifiyaat Express is a daily superfast express train of the Indian Railways, running between Azamgarh, Uttar Pradesh, and Old Delhi, the capital city of India.

The name Kaifiyat tributes to legendary poet late Mr. Kaifi Azmi, who belonged to Azamgarh.

== Number and nomenclature ==
The train numbers of the Kaifiyat Expresses are:

- 12225 UP:- From Azamgarh to Old Delhi – 806 km/14:35 hrs
- 12226 DN:- From Old Delhi to Azamgarh – 806 km/14:30 hrs

== Route and halts ==
- Old Delhi
- Ghaziabad Junction
- Aligarh Junction
- Kanpur Central
- Unnao Junction
- Aishbagh Junction
- Badshahnagar
- Barabanki Junction
- Rudauli
- Ayodhya Cantt
- Ayodhya Dham Junction
- Gosainganj
- Akbarpur Junction
- Malipur
- Shahganj Junction
- Khorason Road
- Sarai Mir
- Azamgarh

== Coach composition ==
The train generally consists of a total number of 22 LHB coach as follows:

- 1 AC First Class
- 2 AC II Tier
- 6 AC III Tier
- 7 Sleeper class
- 4 General Unreserved
- 1 SLR (Seating cum Luggage Rake)
- 1 EOG (End on Generator)

== Locomotive ==
Earlier it used to have loco reversal at Lucknow Jn (NER), but now it bypasses Charbagh line and halts at Aishbagh Junction to avoid loco reversal.

When the route was not electrified, it was hauled by a diesel loco from Azamgarh to Lucknow and from Lucknow, a Ghaziabad-based Indian locomotive class WAP-7 or Indian locomotive class WAP-5 hauled it to Delhi and vice versa.

But since the whole route is now electrified and train belongs to Northern Railway zone of Indian Railways, a GZB (NR) WAP-7 or WAP-5 powers it for the entire journey.

- WAP-5 / WAP-7:- Azamgarh Junction to Old Delhi

== See also ==
- Godaan Express
- Chhapra Express
- Utsarg Express
