= Bandanpur =

Village in Uttar Pradesh, India

- Village
- Location in Uttar Pradesh, India Bandanpur (India)
- Coordinates: 26°36′N 82°26′E
- Country: India
- State: Uttar Pradesh
- Division: Ayodhya division
- District: Ayodhya district

Government
  - BJP: Vidyabhushan Tiwari

Population
  - Total: 2,700

Languages
  - Official: Hindi
- Time zone: UTC+5:30 (IST)
- PIN: 224141

Bandanpur is a village in Ayodhya district of the Indian state of Uttar Pradesh.

== Geography ==
It is 8 km from the historical site of Sringirishi Ashram. Bandanpur is 40 km away from district headquarters Ayodhya city. Bandanpur is within 5 km of the villages of Hardoiya, Aanapur Saraiya, Hardi, Khirauni, Khirauni, Amsin, Trilokpur, Samda, Maya Bazar, Mehbubganj and Goshainganj.

== History ==
=== Bandanpur and Jayanti Prasad Tiwari ===
Jayanti Prasad Tiwari was a social activist born in Bandanpur to a Brahmin Tiwari family. Shri Jayanti Prasad Tiwari, who journeyed in 1932 from Bandanpur to Ahmedabad. During his journey, he helped many people find employment in various mills and other companies. It is claimed that after Tiwari began working with the late Khan Bahadur Rustom Cama at Cama Group, he took Mahatma Gandhi's ashes to Ahmedabad, and that after thirteen days after Gandhi's death, his ashes were immersed in the rivers and seas of the country. Jayanti Prasad Tiwari (1925 - 1983), the founder of the Jan Sewa Ashram Purva Madhymik Vidyalay school in 1979. Jayanti Prasad Tiwari was a social activist from Uttar Pradesh and was born in the village of Bandanpur to a well-known Brahmin Tiwari family. In 1932, at a young age, he moved to Ahmedabad and worked with Rustom Cama, a notable figure from Ahmedabad. He was unable to study during his childhood, therefore, as an adult, he decided to open schools and universities, beginning in his home village. Fundraising has allowed the foundation of the Jan Sewa Ashram schools. His death on March 28, 1983, is commemorated every year at his schools.

Another notable figure is the late Shri Anantu Tiwari, who lost his life in the Indus Pak war. Ramshubhavan Tiwari retired Army Caption Jawalaprasad Tiwari Notable Villager Ambicaprasad Tiwari Has a record for Holding Gram Pradhan Post for More than 25 Years.

== Agriculture ==
In Bandanpur, people are dependent on agriculture. Wheat, rice, sugarcane, mustard, and mangoes are the main crops.

== Education ==
- Jan Sewa Ashram, primary school
- Maa Vidhyavasini Shikshan Seva Trust
- Government Primary School
- A.S. Public School
- Pawan Public School
- A.S. Memorial Degree College
- Paavan Children Academy

== Transport ==
The nearest railway station is Goshainganj Railway Station, over 5 kilometres (3.1 mi) away.

The nearest bus station is also there.
