= Ahmedabad–Varanasi City Sabarmati Express =

Train in India

Ahmedabad-Varanasi Sabarmati Express

Overview
- Service type: Express
- Status: Active
- Locale: Gujarat, Madhya Pradesh and Uttar Pradesh
- First service: 26 January 1976; 50 years ago
- Current operator: Western Railway

Route
- Termini: Ahmedabad (ADI); Varanasi City (BCY)
- Stops: 50
- Distance travelled: 1,592 km (989 mi)
- Average journey time: 35hrs 05 mins
- Service frequency: 4 days a week
- Train number: 19167 / 19168

On-board services
- Classes: AC 2 tier, AC 3 tier, Sleeper class, General Unreserved
- Seating arrangements: No
- Sleeping arrangements: Yes
- Catering facilities: On-board catering, E-catering
- Observation facilities: Rake sharing with 19165/19166 Ahmedabad–Darbhanga Sabarmati Express
- Baggage facilities: No
- Other facilities: Below the seats

Technical
- Rolling stock: LHB coach
- Track gauge: 1,676 mm (5 ft 6 in)
- Operating speed: 44 km/h (27 mph) average including halts.

The 19167 / 19168 Ahmedabad–Varanasi Sabarmati Express is an express train which connects the city of Ahmedabad in the western state of Gujarat to Varanasi city in the northern state of Uttar Pradesh through Jhansi. The train may take up to two days to complete the journey. It travels through Uttar Pradesh, Madhya Pradesh and Gujarat.

== History ==
On 27 February 2002, the train was stopped outside Godhra Junction railway station because of the emergency chain being pulled. The train was then attacked.

Fifty-nine Hindu pilgrims who were returning from the holy city of Ayodhya, were trapped and killed in the burning train. The incident is perceived as the trigger for the widespread 2002 Gujarat riots.

== Route and halts ==
The important stops of the train are:

- Ahmedabad Junction
- Maninagar
- Nadiad Junction
- Anand Junction
- Chhayapuri (Vadodara)
- Godhra Junction
- Dahod
- Ratlam Junction
- Ujjain Junction
- Ruthiyai Junction
- Guna Junction
- Ashoknagar
- Bina Junction
- Jhansi Junction
- Kanpur Central
- Lucknow Charbagh
- Faizabad Junction
- Ayodhya Junction
- Goshainganj
- Akbarpur Junction
- Malipur
- Shahganj Junction
- Jaunpur Junction
- Varanasi Junction

== Coach composite ==
The train consists of 22 coaches:

- 2 AC II Tier
- 6 AC III Tier
- 8 Sleeper coaches
- 4 General
- 1 Seating and luggage / Generator car

== Traction ==
As the route is fully electrified, it is hauled by a Vadodara Loco Shed-based WAP-7 electric locomotive for its entire journey.

== Schedule ==
Train number	Station code	Departure station	Departure time (IST)	Departure days	Arrival station	Arrival time	Arrival days
19167	ADI	Ahmedabad Junction	11:10 PM (Day 1)	MON TUE THU SAT	Varanasi City	10:15 AM (Day 3)	WED THU SAT MON
19168	BCY	Varanasi City	2:05 PM (Day 1)	SUN TUE THU FRI	Ahmedabad Junction	12:55 AM(Day 3)	TUE THU SAT SUN

== Direction reversal ==
The train reverses its direction 2 times:

- Bina Junction
- Vadodara Junction

== Rake sharing ==
The train shares its rake with 19165/19166 Ahmedabad–Darbhanga Sabarmati Express

== See also ==
- 2002 Gujarat violence
- Godhra Junction railway station
