= Mehbubganj =

- Town
- Location in Uttar Pradesh, India Mehbubganj (India)
- Coordinates: 26.6300°N 82.4513°E
- Country: India
- State: Uttar Pradesh
- District: Ayodhya
- Elevation: 0 m (0 ft)

Population (2001)
  - Total: 7,000

Languages
  - Official: Hindi
- Time zone: UTC+5:30 (IST)
- Telephone code: 05271
- Vehicle registration: UP 42
- Website: up.gov.in

Mehbubganj is a town in Ayodhya district in the Indian state of Uttar Pradesh. Mehbubganj is 35 km (22 mi) east of the district headquarters Ayodhya.

== Nearby towns ==
- Goshainganj
- Amsin
- Tanda
- Eltefatganj
- Maya Bazar
- Rajesultanpur
