= Varanasi–Bareilly Express =

Train in India

Overview
- Service type: Express
- Locale: Uttar Pradesh
- Current operator: Northern Railway

Route
- Termini: Varanasi Junction (BSB); Bareilly Junction (BE)
- Stops: 27
- Distance travelled: 559 km (347 mi)
- Average journey time: 12 hrs 50 mins
- Service frequency: Daily
- Train number: 14235 / 14236

On-board services
- Classes: AC 2 Tier, AC 3 Tier, Sleeper Class, General Unreserved
- Seating arrangements: No
- Sleeping arrangements: Yes
- Catering facilities: E-catering
- Observation facilities: Large windows
- Baggage facilities: No
- Other facilities: Below the seats

Technical
- Rolling stock: ICF coach
- Track gauge: 1,676 mm (5 ft 6 in)
- Operating speed: 44 km/h (27 mph) average including halts.

The 14235 / 14236 Varanasi–Bareilly Express is an express train belonging to Northern Railway zone that runs between Bareilly Junction and Varanasi Junction in India. It is currently being operated with 14235/14236 train numbers on a daily basis.

== Service ==
The 14235/Varanasi–Bareilly Express has an average speed of 38 km/h and covers 559 km in 14h 45m. 14236/Bareilly–Varanasi Express has an average speed of 37 km/h and covers 559 km in 15h 15m.

== Route and halts ==
The important halts of the train are:

- Varanasi Junction
- Babatpur
- Zafarabad Junction
- Jaunpur Junction
- Shahganj Junction
- Akbarpur Junction
- Goshainganj
- Ayodhya Junction
- Faizabad Junction
- Daryabad
- Barabanki Junction
- Malhaur
- Lucknow Charbagh
- Alamnagar
- Balamau
- Anjhi Shahbad
- Shahjahanpur
- Tilhar
- Bareilly Junction

== Coach composition ==
The train has standard ICF rakes with max speed of 110 kmph. The train consists of 15 coaches:

- 1 AC First-class
- 1 AC II Tier
- 3 AC III Tier
- 5 Sleeper coaches
- 4 General

== Traction ==
Both trains are hauled by a Ghaziabad Loco Shed-based WAP-5 Electric locomotive from Bareilly to Varanasi and vice versa.

== See also ==
- Varanasi Junction railway station
- Bareilly Junction railway station
- Bhagmati Express
