= Darwan =

Darwan may refer to:

- Darwan, India, a large village
  - Darwan Lake, a lake
- Darwan, Yemen, a sub-district
- Darwan Singh Negi (1883–1950), Indian soldier awarded the Victoria Cross
