= Bayt Ibn Mahdi =

Bayt Ibn Mahdi بيت ابن مهدي
- Sub-district
- Location in Yemen
- Country: Yemen
- Governorate: Sana'a Governorate
- District: Al Haymah Al Kharijiyah District

Population (2004)
  - Total: 980
- Time zone: UTC+3

Bayt Ibn Mahdi (Arabic: بيت ابن مهدي) is a sub-district located in the Al Haymah Al Kharijiyah District, Sana'a Governorate, Yemen. Bayt Ibn Mahdi had a population of 980 according to the 2004 census.
