= Amsin =

- Town
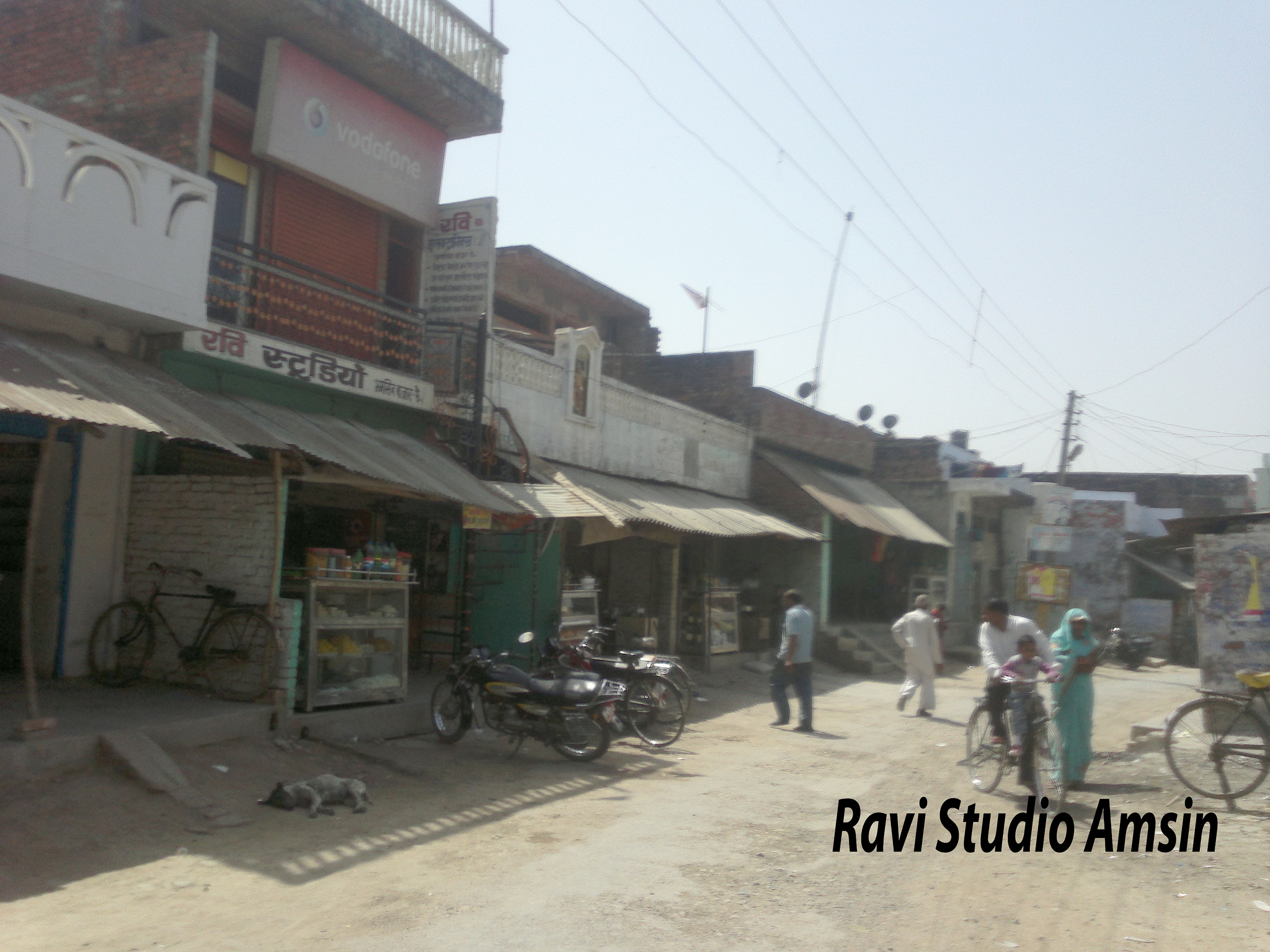
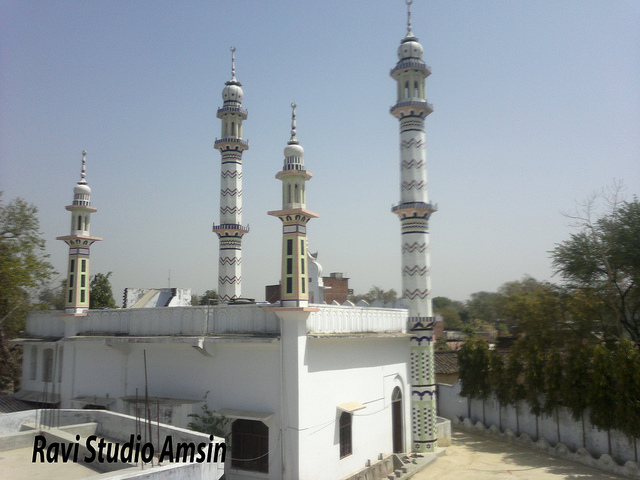
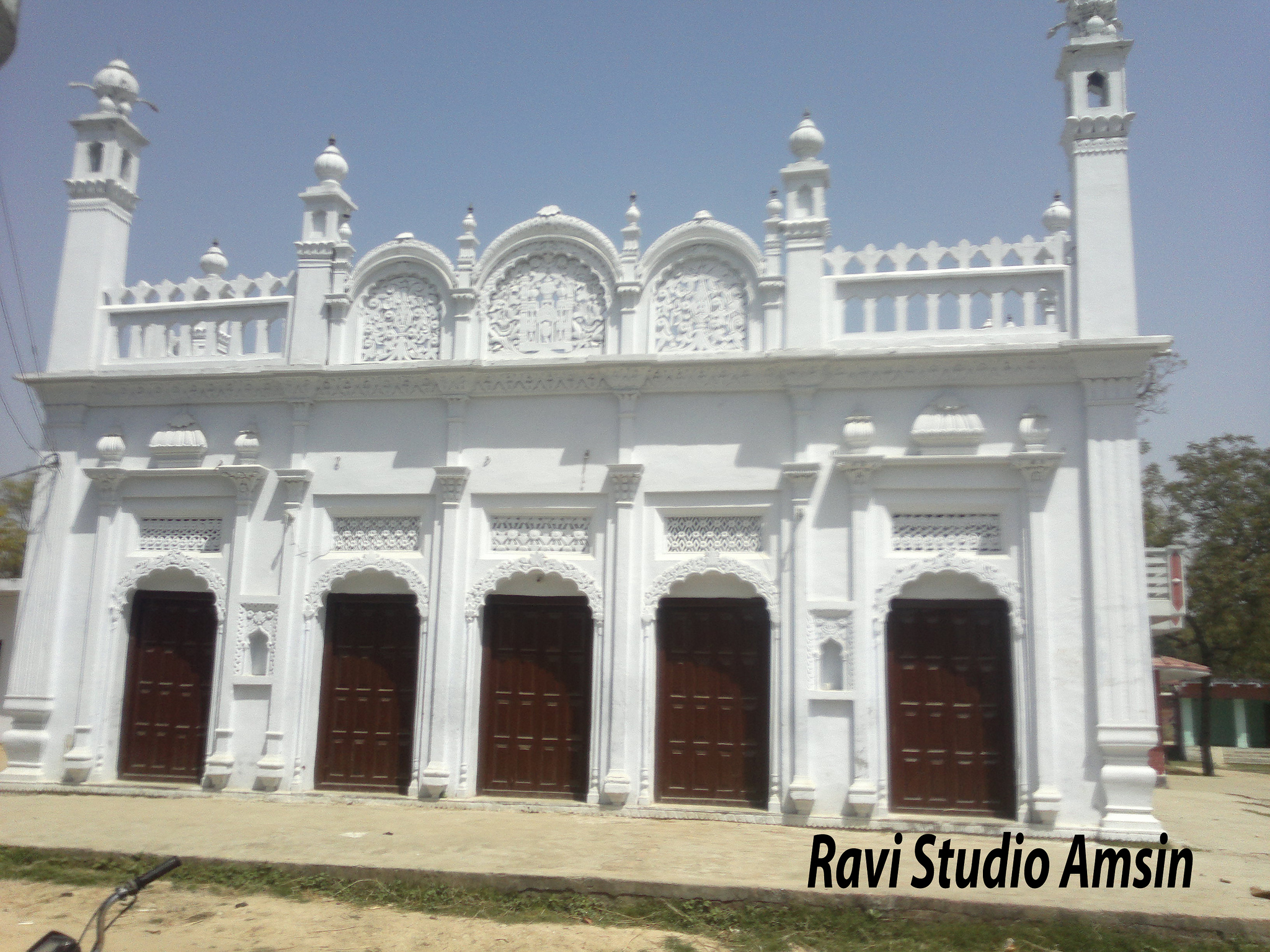
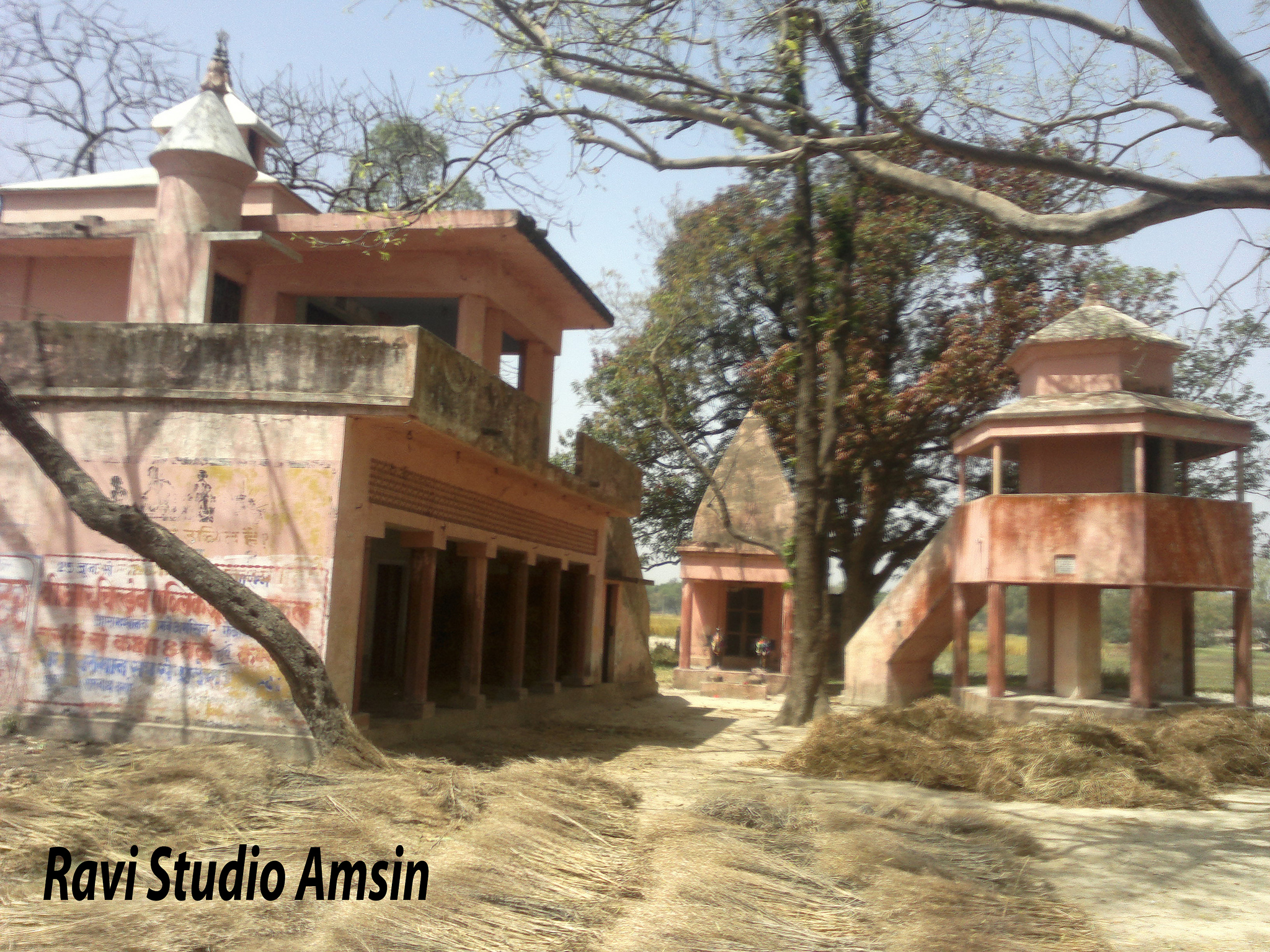
- Chowk Bazaar Amsin Shaikhana Masjid Amsin Imambara Amsin Kali Chaura Amsin

- Location within Uttar Pradesh Location within India
- Coordinates: 26.5733°N 82.4357°E
- Country: India
- State: Uttar Pradesh
- District: Ayodhya

Area
  - Total: 2.25 km^{2} (0.87 sq mi)
- Elevation: 100 m (330 ft)

Population (2011)
  - Total: 10,000
  - Density: 4,400/km^{2} (12,000/sq mi)

Languages
  - Official: Hindi, Urdu
  - Regional: Awadhi
- Time zone: UTC+5:30 (IST)
- PIN: 224141
- Telephone code: 05278
- Vehicle registration: UP-42

Amsin is a town and Gram Panchayat in Ayodhya district in the Indian state of Uttar Pradesh, India. Amsin is 43 km away from district headquarters Ayodhya city.

== History ==
Amsin was a former revenue unit and administrative unit of the Muslim kingdoms and British Raj. Amsin consisted of several mouzas, which were the smallest revenue units. Parganas are equivalent to present day districts system. A very large area up to Ayodhya was under the administration of Amsin Pargana. In late 16th century this pargana was conquered by Pugnacious Baruwars they occupied 159 villages of this pargana and established a separate Taluka Pali (Tandauli).

== Geography ==
Amsin is located at 26.5733°N 82.4357°E. It has an average elevation of 315 ft.

== Transport ==
=== Road ===
Amsin is situated on the way to Akbarpur road and is well connected to other cities, towns and markets. Goshainganj, Tanda and Maya are nearby towns.

=== Train ===
Goshainganj railway station is the nearest railway station which is 5 km away. Ayodhya Cantt and Ayodhya Dham Junction are nearby main railway stations for connectivity.

=== Air ===
Ayodhya Airport is the nearest airport from Amsin, Ayodhya district.

== Nearby Places ==
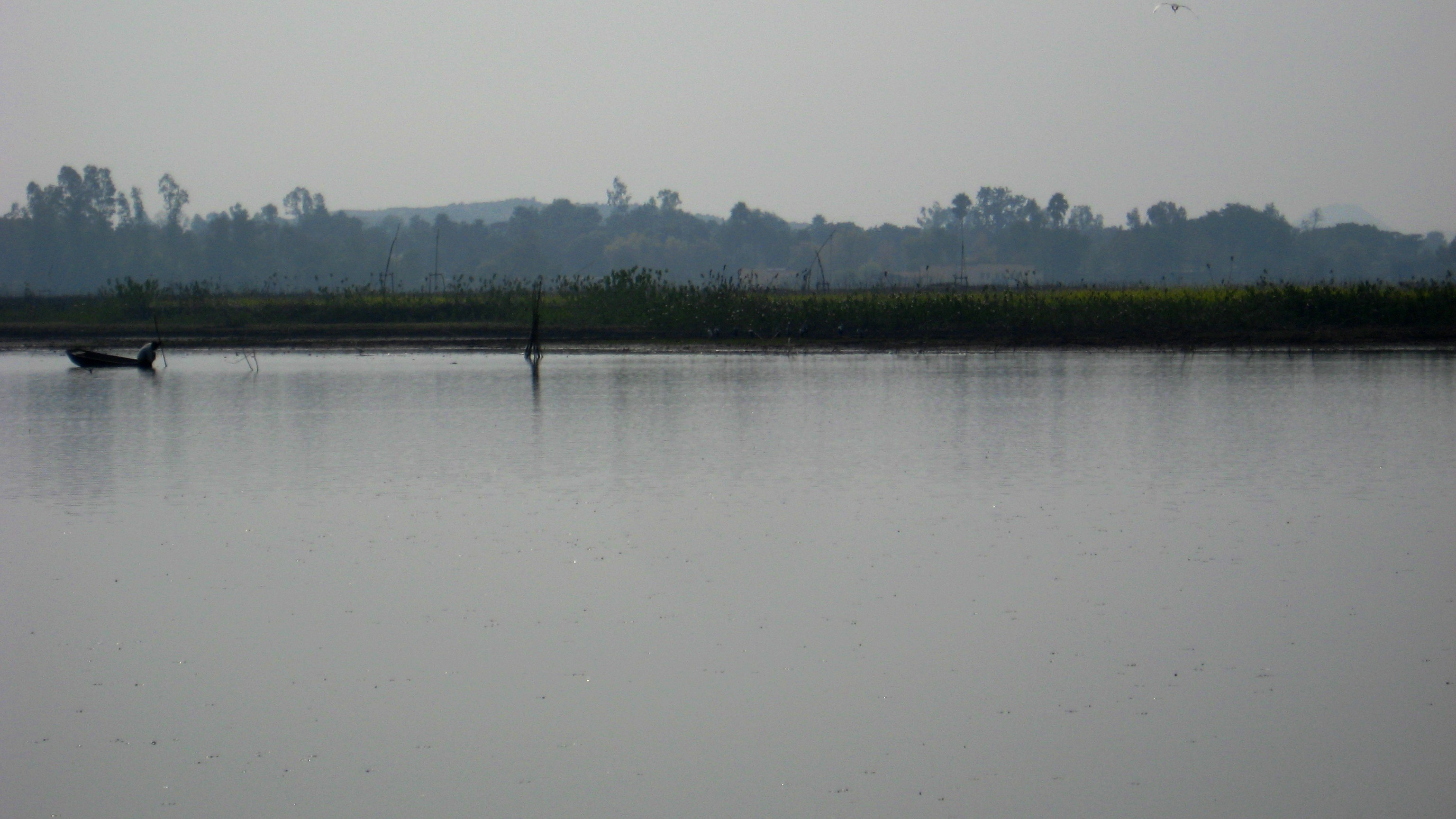
Darwan Lake

There are two big lakes near Amsin namely Darwan lake and Bhadauna lake the former one is a greater lake.

== Demographics ==
As of 2001 India census, Amsin nagar panchayat had a population near about 10000. Males constitute about ~58% of the population and females about ~42%. Amsin has an average literacy rate of ~54%, lower than the national average of 59.5%: male literacy is 72%, and female literacy is 52%.

Religions in Amsin
| Religion | Percent |
| Hindus | 46% |
| Muslims | 41% |
| Buddhists | 12% |
| Others† | 0.6% |
Distribution of religions †Includes Sikhs (<0.2%), Jains (<0.2%).

== Education ==
- Imamia Public School

== See also ==
- Goshainganj railway station
- Ayodhya Cantt railway station
- Akbarpur Junction railway station
- Ayodhya International Airport
- Akbarpur Airport
