= Bayt al-Jarydi =

Bayt al-Jarydi بيت الجريدي
- Sub-district
- Location in Yemen
- Coordinates: 15.036°N 43.859°E
- Country: Yemen
- Governorate: Sana'a Governorate
- District: Al Haymah Al Kharijiyah District

Population (2004)
  - Total: 1,253
- Time zone: UTC+3

Bayt al-Jarydi (Arabic: بيت الجريدي) is a sub-district located in Al Haymah Al Kharijiyah District, Sana'a Governorate, Yemen. Bayt al-Jarydi had a population of 1253 according to the 2004 census.
