= Bayt al-Aliyai =

Bayt al-Aliyai بيت العليي
- Sub-district
- Location in Yemen
- Country: Yemen
- Governorate: Sana'a Governorate
- District: Al Haymah Al Kharijiyah District

Population (2004)
  - Total: 1,781
- Time zone: UTC+3

Bayt al-Aliyai (Arabic: بيت العليي) is a sub-district located in the Al Haymah Al Kharijiyah District, Sana'a Governorate, Yemen. Bayt al-Aliyai had a population of 1781 according to the 2004 census.
