= Al-Arwsh =

Al-Arwsh (Sanaa) الأعروش
- Sub-district
- Location in Yemen
- Coordinates: 15°01′06″N 43°55′34″E
- Country: Yemen
- Governorate: Sana'a Governorate
- District: Al Haymah Al Kharijiyah District

Population (2004)
  - Total: 1,300
- Time zone: UTC+3

Al-Arwsh (Sanaa) (Arabic: الأعروش) is a sub-district located in the Al Haymah Al Kharijiyah District, Sana'a Governorate, Yemen. Al-Arwsh (Sanaa) had a population of 1300 according to the 2004 census.
