= Al-Raba'a =

Al-Raba'a الربع
- Sub-district
- Location in Yemen
- Coordinates: 15°10′10″N 43°57′30″E
- Country: Yemen
- Governorate: Sana'a Governorate
- District: Al Haymah Al Kharijiyah District

Population (2004)
  - Total: 2,248
- Time zone: UTC+3

Al-Raba'a (Arabic: الربع) is a sub-district located in the Al Haymah Al Kharijiyah District, Sana'a Governorate, Yemen. Al-Raba'a had a population of 2248 according to the 2004 census.
