= Al-Jahadib =

Al-Jahadib الجحادب
- Sub-district
- Location in Yemen
- Coordinates: 15.13764°N 43.85811°E
- Country: Yemen
- Governorate: Sana'a Governorate
- District: Al Haymah Al Kharijiyah District

Population (2004)
  - Total: 3,125
- Time zone: UTC+3

Al-Jahadib (Arabic: الجحادب) is a sub-district located in the Al Haymah Al Kharijiyah District, Sana'a Governorate, Yemen. Al-Jahadib had a population of 3125 according to the 2004 census.
