= Al-Mikhlaf =

Al-Mikhlaf المخلاف
- Sub-district
- Location in Yemen
- Coordinates: 15.12693°N 43.93304°E
- Country: Yemen
- Governorate: Sana'a Governorate
- District: Al Haymah Al Kharijiyah District

Population (2004)
  - Total: 6,052
- Time zone: UTC+3

Al-Mikhlaf (Arabic: المخلاف) is a sub-district located in the Al Haymah Al Kharijiyah District, Sana'a Governorate, Yemen. Al-Mikhlaf had a population of 6052 according to the 2004 census.
