= Yada'a =

Yada'a يادع
- Sub-district
- Location in Yemen
- Coordinates: 15°08′47″N 43°48′53″E
- Country: Yemen
- Governorate: Sana'a Governorate
- District: Al Haymah Al Kharijiyah District

Population (2004)
  - Total: 1,998
- Time zone: UTC+3

Yada'a (Arabic: يادع) is a sub-district located in the Al Haymah Al Kharijiyah District, Sana'a Governorate, Yemen. Yada'a had a population of 1998 according to the 2004 census.
