= Julalah =

Julalah جحالة
- Sub-district
- Location in Yemen
- Country: Yemen
- Governorate: Sana'a Governorate
- District: Al Haymah Al Kharijiyah District

Population (2004)
  - Total: 1,371
- Time zone: UTC+3

Julalah (Arabic: جحالة) is a sub-district located in Al Haymah Al Kharijiyah District, Sana'a Governorate, Yemen. Julalah had a population of 1371 according to the 2004 census.
