= Bani Walid (Sanaa) =

Bani Walid بني وليد
- Sub-district
- Location in Yemen
- Coordinates: 15°01′13″N 43°53′46″E
- Country: Yemen
- Governorate: Sana'a Governorate
- District: Al Haymah Al Kharijiyah District

Population (2004)
  - Total: 1,846
- Time zone: UTC+3

Bani Walid (Arabic: بني وليد) is a sub-district located in Al Haymah Al Kharijiyah District, Sana'a Governorate, Yemen. Bani Walid had a population of 1846 according to the 2004 census.
