= Bani al-Qalam =

Bani al-Qalam بني القلام
- Sub-district
- Location in Yemen
- Coordinates: 14°57′18″N 43°54′33″E
- Country: Yemen
- Governorate: Sana'a Governorate
- District: Al Haymah Al Kharijiyah District

Population (2004)
  - Total: 1,110
- Time zone: UTC+3

Bani al-Qalam (Arabic: بني القلام) is a sub-district located in Al Haymah Al Kharijiyah District, Sana'a Governorate, Yemen. Bani al-Qalam had a population of 1110 according to the 2004 census.
