= Al-Sads =

Al-Sads السدس
- Sub-district
- Location in Yemen
- Coordinates: 14°57′49″N 43°46′59″E
- Country: Yemen
- Governorate: Sana'a Governorate
- District: Al Haymah Al Kharijiyah District

Population (2004)
  - Total: 841
- Time zone: UTC+3

Al-Sads (Arabic: السدس) is a sub-district located in Al Haymah Al Kharijiyah District, Sana'a Governorate, Yemen. Al-Sads had a population of 841 according to the 2004 census.
