= Bani Arwah =

Bani Arwah بني عروة
- Sub-district
- Location in Yemen
- Coordinates: 14°55′07″N 43°50′30″E
- Country: Yemen
- Governorate: Sana'a Governorate
- District: Al Haymah Al Kharijiyah District

Population (2004)
  - Total: 1,373
- Time zone: UTC+3

Bani Arwah (Arabic: بني عروة) is a sub-district located in Al Haymah Al Kharijiyah District, Sana'a Governorate, Yemen. Bani Arwah had a population of 1373 according to the 2004 census.
