= GGJ =

GGJ could refer to:

- Georgemas Junction railway station, Scotland
- Goshainganj Railway Station, India
- Global Game Jam, a game developers event
- Governor-General of Jamaica
