= Al-Sawfah =

Al-Sawfah الصوفة
- Sub-district
- Location in Yemen
- Coordinates: 14°59′02″N 43°56′42″E
- Country: Yemen
- Governorate: Sana'a Governorate
- District: Al Haymah Al Kharijiyah District

Population (2004)
  - Total: 513
- Time zone: UTC+3

Al-Sawfah (Arabic: الصوفة) is a sub-district located in the Al Haymah Al Kharijiyah District, Sana'a Governorate, Yemen. Al-Sawfah had a population of 513 according to the 2004 census.
