= Al-Mahyam =

Al-Mahyam المحيام
- Sub-district
- Location in Yemen
- Coordinates: 14°54′18″N 43°44′49″E
- Country: Yemen
- Governorate: Sana'a Governorate
- District: Al Haymah Al Kharijiyah District

Population (2004)
  - Total: 1,786
- Time zone: UTC+3

Al-Mahyam (Arabic: المحيام) is a sub-district located in Al Haymah Al Kharijiyah District, Sana'a Governorate, Yemen. Al-Mahyam had a population of 1786 according to the 2004 census.
