= Al-Hatb =

Al-Hatb الحطب
- Sub-district
- Location in Yemen
- Coordinates: 14°53′38″N 43°47′07″E
- Country: Yemen
- Governorate: Sana'a Governorate
- District: Al Haymah Al Kharijiyah District

Population (2004)
  - Total: 2,103
- Time zone: UTC+3

Al-Hatb (Arabic: الحطب) is a sub-district located in Al Haymah Al Kharijiyah District, Sana'a Governorate, Yemen. Al-Hatb had a population of 2103 according to the 2004 census.
