= Bani Faras =

Bani Faras بني فراص
- Sub-district
- Location in Yemen
- Coordinates: 14.89864°N 43.87606°E
- Country: Yemen
- Governorate: Sana'a Governorate
- District: Al Haymah Al Kharijiyah District

Population (2004)
  - Total: 1,008
- Time zone: UTC+3

Bani Faras (Arabic: بني فراص) is a sub-district located in Al Haymah Al Kharijiyah District, Sana'a Governorate, Yemen. Bani Faras had a population of 1,008 according to the 2004 census. It is classified as a sub‑district (an administrative division within the district).
