= Sahah =

Sahah سحاح
- Sub-district
- Location in Yemen
- Country: Yemen
- Governorate: Sana'a Governorate
- District: Al Haymah Al Kharijiyah District

Population (2004)
  - Total: 895
- Time zone: UTC+3

Sahah (Arabic: سحاح) is a sub-district located in the Al Haymah Al Kharijiyah District, Sana'a Governorate, Yemen. Sahah had a population of 895 according to the 2004 census.
