= Bani Shamhan =

Bani Shamhan بني شمهان
- Sub-district
- Location in Yemen
- Coordinates: 14.979°N 43.882°E
- Country: Yemen
- Governorate: Sana'a Governorate
- District: Al Haymah Al Kharijiyah District

Population (2004)
  - Total: 2,500
- Time zone: UTC+3

Bani Shamhan (Arabic: بني شمهان) is a sub-district located in Al Haymah Al Kharijiyah District, Sana'a Governorate, Yemen. Bani Shamhan had a population of 2500 according to the 2004 census.
