= Gosainganj =

Gosainganj may refer to:

- Gosainganj, Lucknow
- Gosainganj, Faizabad
- Goshainganj (Assembly constituency)
