= Bani Sulaiman (Al Haymah Al Kharijiyah) =

Bani Sulaiman بني سليمان
- Sub-district
- Location in Yemen
- Coordinates: 15°11′38″N 43°56′53″E
- Country: Yemen
- Governorate: Sana'a Governorate
- District: Al Haymah Al Kharijiyah District

Population (2004)
  - Total: 5,297
- Time zone: UTC+3

Bani Sulaiman (Arabic: بني سليمان) is a sub-district located in the Al Haymah Al Kharijiyah District, Sana'a Governorate, Yemen. Bani Sulaiman had a population of 5297 according to the 2004 census.
