= Bani Juhdab =

Bani Juhdab بني جحدب
- Sub-district
- Location in Yemen
- Coordinates: 14°54′21″N 43°51′23″E
- Country: Yemen
- Governorate: Sana'a Governorate
- District: Al Haymah Al Kharijiyah District

Population (2004)
  - Total: 1,003
- Time zone: UTC+3

Bani Juhdab (Arabic: بني جحدب) is a sub-district located in Al Haymah Al Kharijiyah District, Sana'a Governorate, Yemen. Bani Juhdab had a population of 1003 according to the 2004 census.
