= Bani Bajair =

Bani Bajair بني بجير
- Sub-district
- Location in Yemen
- Coordinates: 14°59′05″N 43°49′38″E
- Country: Yemen
- Governorate: Sana'a Governorate
- District: Al Haymah Al Kharijiyah District

Population (2004)
  - Total: 4,840
- Time zone: UTC+3

Bani Bajair (Arabic: بني بجير) is a sub-district located in the Al Haymah Al Kharijiyah District, Sana'a Governorate, Yemen. Bani Bajair had a population of 4840 according to the 2004 census.
