= Mafhaq (Sanaa) =

Mafhaq مفحق
- Sub-district
- Location in Yemen
- Country: Yemen
- Governorate: Sana'a Governorate
- District: Al Haymah Al Kharijiyah District

Population (2004)
  - Total: 1,239
- Time zone: UTC+3

Mafhaq (Arabic: مفحق) is a sub-district located in the Al Haymah Al Kharijiyah District, Sana'a Governorate, Yemen. Mafhaq had a population of 1239 according to the 2004 census.
