= Al-Ajaz =

Al-Ajaz العجز
- Sub-district
- Location in Yemen
- Coordinates: 15°06′05″N 43°49′54″E
- Country: Yemen
- Governorate: Sana'a Governorate
- District: Al Haymah Al Kharijiyah District

Population (2004)
  - Total: 1,971
- Time zone: UTC+3

Al-Ajaz (Arabic: العجز) is a sub-district located in the Al Haymah Al Kharijiyah District, Sana'a Governorate, Yemen. Al-Ajaz had a population of 1971 according to the 2004 census.
