= Bani Mohamed =

Bani Mohamed بني محمد
- Sub-district
- Location in Yemen
- Coordinates: 14°54′28″N 43°49′24″E
- Country: Yemen
- Governorate: Sana'a Governorate
- District: Al Haymah Al Kharijiyah District

Population (2004)
  - Total: 1,149
- Time zone: UTC+3

Bani Mohamed (Arabic: بني محمد) is a sub-district located in Al Haymah Al Kharijiyah District, Sana'a Governorate, Yemen. Bani Mohamed had a population of 1149 according to the 2004 census.
