= Al-Amour =

Al-Amour الاعمور
- Sub-district
- Location in Yemen
- Coordinates: 15°04′14″N 43°50′18″E
- Country: Yemen
- Governorate: Sana'a Governorate
- District: Al Haymah Al Kharijiyah District

Population (2004)
  - Total: 985
- Time zone: UTC+3

Al-Amour (Arabic: الاعمور) is a sub-district located in Al Haymah Al Kharijiyah District, Sana'a Governorate, Yemen. Al-Amour had a population of 985 according to the 2004 census.
