= Darwan (Sanaa) =

Darwan دروان
- Sub-district
- Location in Yemen
- Coordinates: 15°11′2.54″N 43°50′5.68″E
- Country: Yemen
- Governorate: Sana'a Governorate
- District: Al Haymah Al Kharijiyah District

Population (2004)
  - Total: 1,867
- Time zone: UTC+3

Darwan (Arabic: دروان) is a sub-district located in the Al Haymah Al Kharijiyah District, Sana'a Governorate, Yemen. Darwan had a population of 1867 according to the 2004 census.
