= Mumbai LTT – Chhapra Express =

Train in India

Mumbai LTT - Chhapra Express
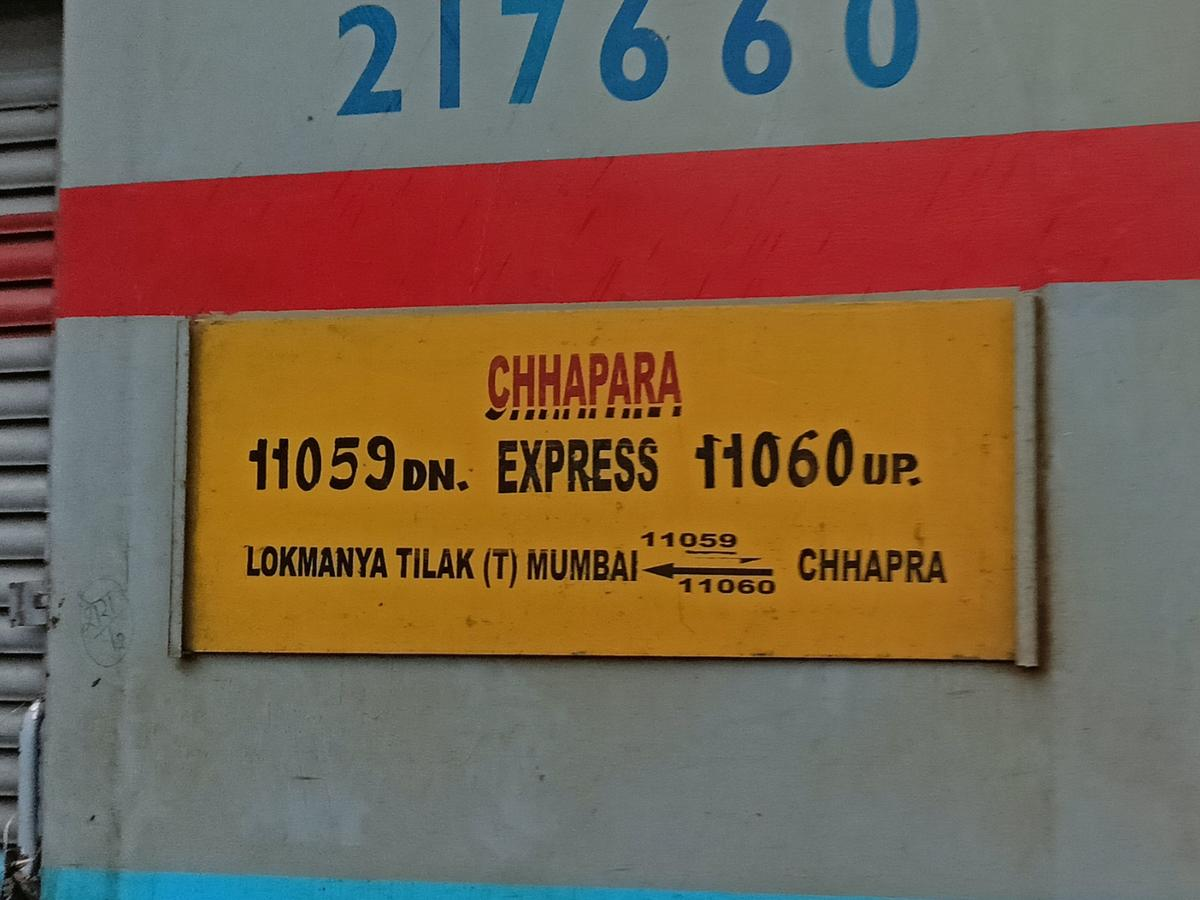

Overview
- Status: Active
- Locale: Bihar, Uttar Pradesh, Madhya Pradesh and Maharashtra
- First service: 17 June 2002; 23 years ago (commercial service)
- Current operator: Western Railway zone

Route
- Termini: Chhapra Jn (CPR); Mumbai LTT
- Stops: 26
- Distance travelled: 1,717 km (1,067 mi)
- Average journey time: 35h 0m
- Service frequency: Tri - Weekly
- Train number: 11059 / 11060

On-board services
- Classes: AC 2-Tier, AC 3-Tier, Sleeper Class & General
- Seating arrangements: Yes
- Sleeping arrangements: Yes
- Catering facilities: IRCTC E-Catering, Zomato & Swiggy
- Observation facilities: Large windows
- Baggage facilities: Available

Technical
- Rolling stock: LHB coach
- Track gauge: 1,676 mm (5 ft 6 in)
- Operating speed: 130 km/h (max), 52 km/h (avg) including halts

The 11059 / 11060 Chhapra–Lokmanya Tilak Terminus Express, also known as the Chhapra Express, is a tri-weekly Mail/Express train operated by the Central Railway zone of Indian Railways. It runs between Chhapra Junction in Bihar and Lokmanya Tilak Terminus (LTT) in Mumbai, Maharashtra, covering a distance of approximately 1,800 km.

== Schedule ==
11059 / 11060 LTT–CPR Express Schedule
Train Type	Express
Distance	~1717 km
Average Speed	~52 km/h
Journey Time (LTT → CPR)	35 hrs 45 min
Journey Time (CPR → LTT)	34 hrs 45 min
Classes Available	2A, 3A, SL, GEN
Operating Days	LTT–CPR: Tue, Thu, Sat; CPR–LTT: Mon, Thu, Sat
Operator	Central Railway

== Route & Halts ==
11059 LTT–CPR Express and 11060 CPR–LTT Express Schedule
Sr.	11059 LTT–CPR EXPRESS (Tue,Thu,Sat)				11060 CPR–LTT EXPRESS (Mon,Thu,Sat)			
Sr.	Station	Day	Arr.	Dep.	Station	Day	Arr.	Dep.
1	Lokmanya Tilak Terminus	1	—	10:55	Chhapra Junction	1	—	05:45
2	Thane	1	11:13	11:15	Siwan Junction	1	06:40	06:45
3	Kalyan Junction	1	11:37	11:40	Mairwa	1	07:01	07:03
4	Nasik Road	1	14:15	14:20	Bhatni Junction	1	07:30	07:40
5	Bhusaval Junction	1	17:30	17:35	Salempur Junction	1	07:58	08:00
6	Itarsi Junction	1	22:00	22:10	Belthara Road	1	08:29	08:31
7	Jabalpur	2	01:00	01:10	Mau Junction	1	09:10	09:15
8	Satna	2	03:45	03:50	Muhammadabad	1	09:39	09:41
9	Prayagraj Junction Train Reversal Point	2	08:10	08:35	Azamgarh	1	10:05	10:10
10	Phulpur	2	09:56	09:58	Sarai Mir	1	10:45	10:47
11	Janghai Junction	2	11:03	11:05	Khorason Road	1	11:05	11:07
12	Mariahu	2	11:58	12:00	Shahganj Junction	1	12:00	12:10
13	Zafarabad Junction	2	12:38	12:40	Jaunpur Junction	1	12:41	12:43
14	Jaunpur Junction	2	13:14	13:16	Zafarabad Junction	1	13:00	13:02
15	Shahganj Junction	2	14:40	14:50	Mariahu	1	13:28	13:30
16	Khorason Road	2	15:12	15:14	Janghai Junction	1	14:13	14:15
17	Sarai Mir	2	15:25	15:27	Phulpur	1	14:48	14:50
18	Azamgarh	2	15:55	16:00	Prayagraj Junction Train Reversal Point	1	16:15	16:40
19	Muhammadabad	2	16:16	16:18	Satna	1	19:55	20:00
20	Mau Junction	2	16:45	16:50	Jabalpur	1	22:35	22:45
21	Belthara Road	2	17:23	17:25	Itarsi Junction	2	02:40	02:50
22	Salempur Junction	2	18:05	18:07	Bhusaval Junction	2	07:30	07:35
23	Bhatni Junction	2	18:30	18:40	Nasik Road	2	10:57	11:00
24	Mairwa	2	19:08	19:10	Kalyan Junction	2	13:57	14:00
25	Siwan Junction	2	19:35	19:40	Thane	2	14:20	14:23
26	Chhapra Junction	2	21:05	—	Lokmanya Tilak Terminus	2	15:30	—

== Coach Composition ==
Coach composition of the train
Category	Coaches	Total
Luggage/Parcel Van	LPR, SLRD	2
General Unreserved (GS)	GEN, GEN, GEN, GEN	4
Sleeper Class (SL)	S1, S2, S3, S4, S5, S6, S7, S8, S9	9
AC 2 Tier (2A)	A1	1
AC 3 Tier (3A)	B1, B2, B3, B4, B5, B6	6
Total Coaches		22

- Primary Maintenance – Mumbai LTT Coaching Depot*

== RSA - Rake Sharing Arrangement ==
This Train shares Rake with Godaan express

== See also ==
- Godaan Express
- Pawan Express
