= Goshainganj =

Goshainganj Gosainganj
- Town
- Location in Uttar Pradesh, India
- Coordinates: 26.570025°N 82.380130°E
- Country: India
- State: Uttar Pradesh
- District: Ayodhya
- Founder: Mahant Iccha Goshain and Rai Ahankaari Singh
- Elevation: 97 m (318 ft)

Population (2011)
  - Total: 12,931
  - Density: 6,465.5/km^{2} (16,746/sq mi)

Language
  - Official: Hindi
  - Additional official: Urdu
  - Regional: Awadhi
- Time zone: UTC+5:30 (IST)
- PIN: 224141
- Telephone code: 05278
- Vehicle registration: UP-42

Goshainganj, also known as Gosainganj, is a town and nagar panchayat in the Ayodhya district of the Indian state of Uttar Pradesh. Located 32 km from the district headquarters Ayodhya, Goshainganj has one of the oldest markets of the district.

== History ==
A local Baruwar Taluqdar named Rai Ahankaari Singh (Ahankari Rae), gave the glebe land for the current market to a saint named Mahant Inccha Gosai, on whose name, the market and later the town came to be known as Gosainganj. While Gosaiganj Katara bazaar was established by the wife of Madho Singh Barwar.

== Geography ==
Goshainganj is located at 26.58°N 82.38°E. It has an average elevation of 97m.

== Demographics ==
Religions in Goshainganj
Religion	Percent
Hindus	80%
Muslims	19%
Jains†	0.3%
Others†	0.7%
Distribution of religions †Includes Sikhs (0.2%), Buddhists (<0.2%).

As of 2011 Indian Census, Goshainganj nagar panchayat had a total population of 12,931, of which 6,702 were males and 6,229 were females. Population within the age group of 0 to 6 years was 1,585. The total number of literates in Goshainganj was 9,512, which constituted 73.6% of the population with male literacy of 77.6% and female literacy of 69.2%. The effective literacy rate of 7+ population of Goshainganj was 83.8%, of which male literacy rate was 88.6% and female literacy rate was 78.7%. The Scheduled Caste population was 1,187. Goshainganj had 2121 households in 2011.

== Governance and politics ==
Goshainganj is a part of Goshainganj Vidhan Sabha constituency and Ambedkar Nagar Lok Sabha constituency.

There is a police station in Goshainganj.

== Transport ==
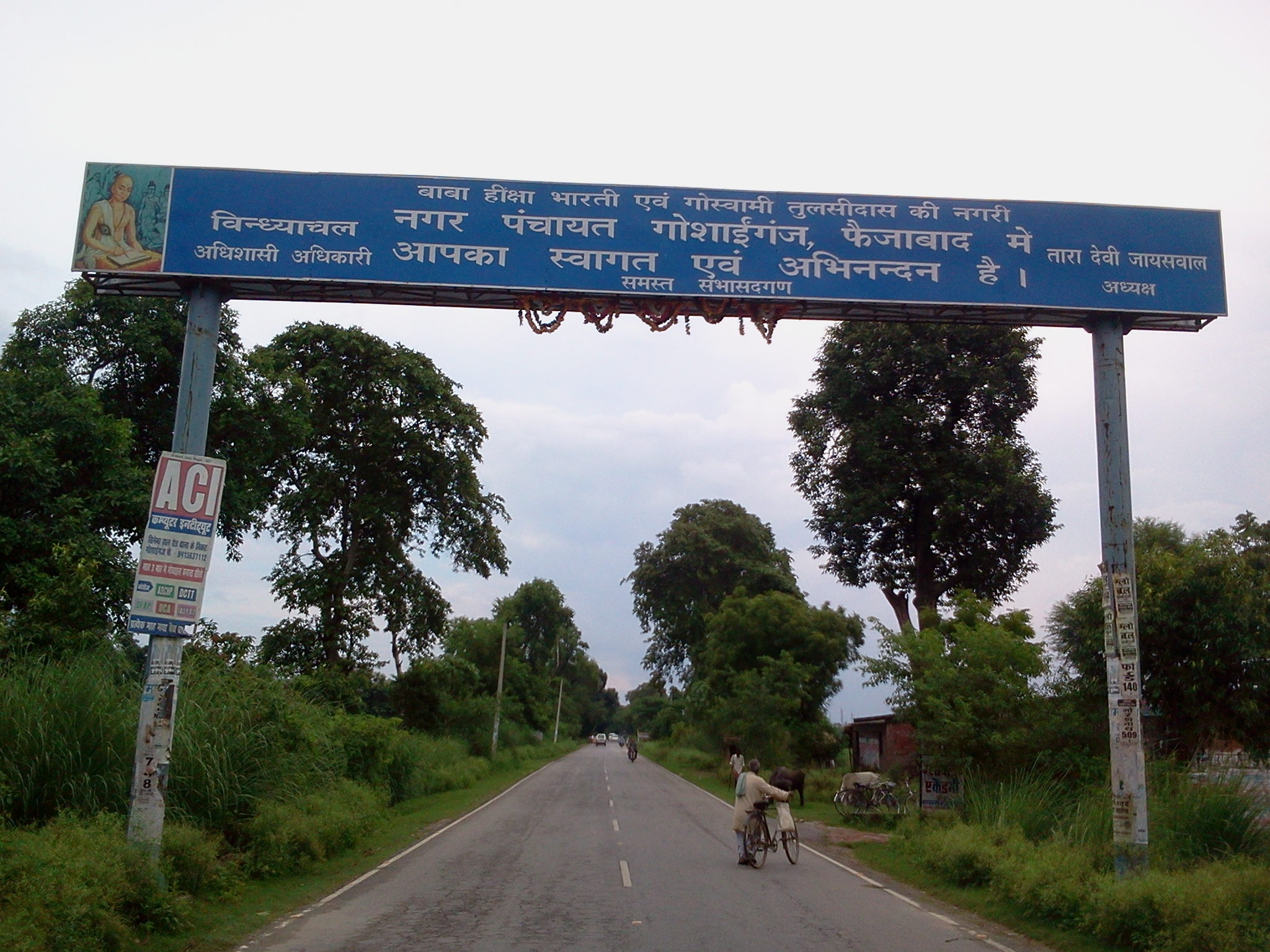
Gateway to Goshainganj from Ayodhya

=== Railways ===
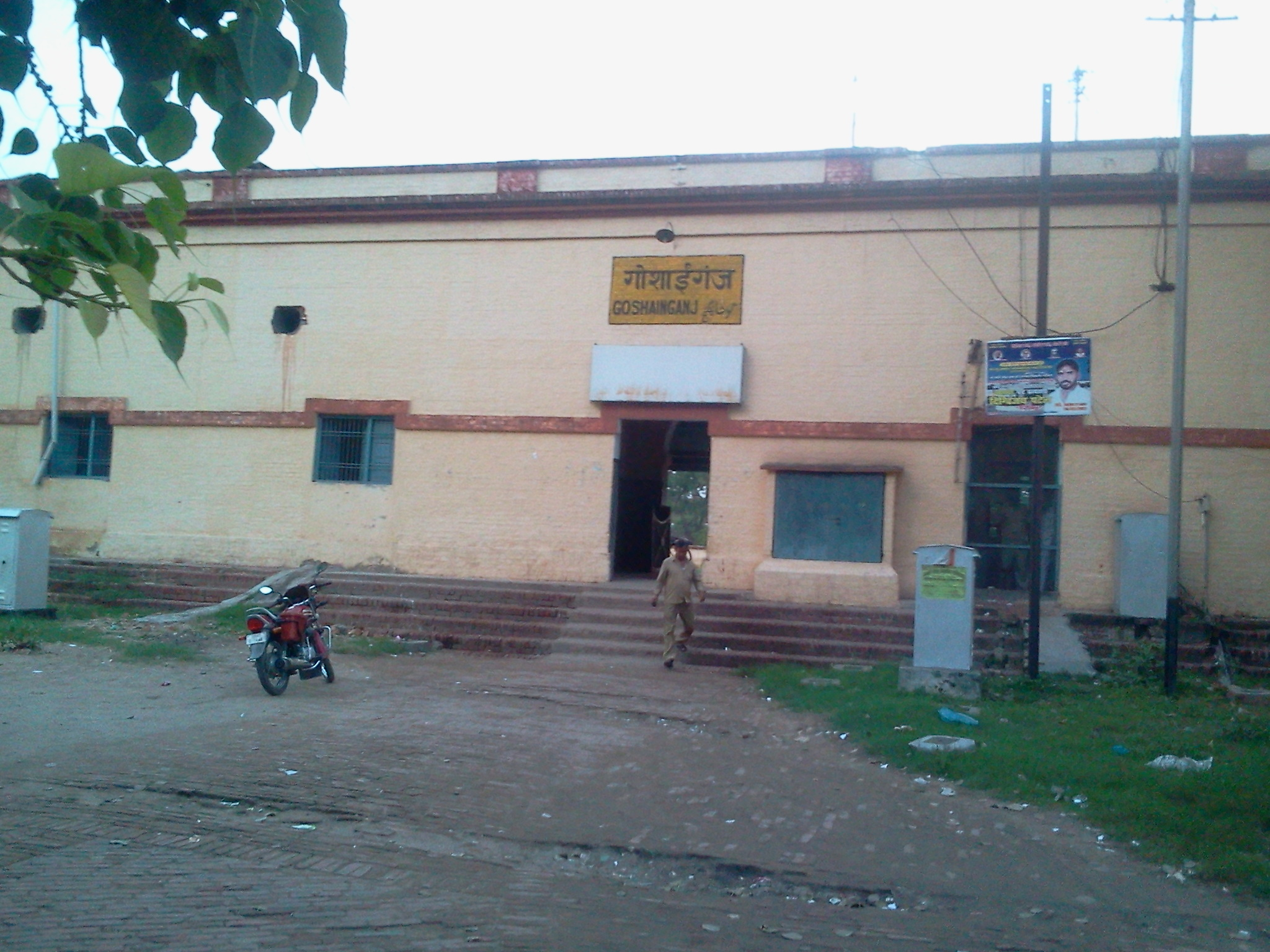
Goshainganj Railway Station

Goshainganj railway station is the nearest railway station situated within the town.

=== Air ===
Ayodhya Airport is the nearest airport to reach Goshainganj.

== Neighbouring cities, towns and markets ==
- Ayodhya
- Akbarpur
- Jalalpur
- Maya Bazar
- Katehri
- Rajesultanpur
- Tanda
- Bandanpur

== See also ==
- Akbarpur Airport
- Awadh
