= Maya Bazar, Ayodhya =

Maya Bazar
- Town
- Location in Uttar Pradesh, India Maya Bazar (India)
- Coordinates: 26°38′37″N 82°20′15″E
- Country: India
- State: Uttar Pradesh
- Division: Ayodhya
- District: Ayodhya
- Named for: Raja Maharaj Singh
- Elevation: 92.6 m (304 ft)

Population (2011)
  - Total: 17,690

Language
  - Official: Hindi
  - Additional official: Urdu
  - Regional: Awadhi
- Time zone: UTC+5:30 (IST)
- PIN: 224161
- Vehicle registration: UP 42
- Sex ratio: 1000/1001 ♂/♀
- Website: up.gov.in

Maya is a town of Ayodhya district of the Indian state of Uttar Pradesh, India. Maya is 24 km away from district headquarters Ayodhya city.

Maya Bazar is also a block in Ayodhya district in Uttar Pradesh.

In Dalpatpur Uparhar village, Famous Hathiram Baba Mutt situated for pilgrims who play Dice game with Tirupati Bala Ji.

== Demographics ==
As of the 2011 Census of India, Maya had a population of 19,690. Males constitute 51% of the population and females 49%. Maya has an average literacy rate of 62%, higher than the national average of 59.5%: male literacy is 71%, and female literacy is 52%. In Maya, 17% of the population is under 6 years of age.

Religions in Maya
Religion	Percent
Hindus	93%
Muslims	7%
Jains	0%
Others†	0%
Distribution of religions †Includes Sikhs (0%), Buddhists (<0%).

== Transport ==
=== Road ===
Maya Bazar is well connected with nearby cities Ayodhya and Sultanpur. And also with Goshainganj, Chaure Bazar and Bikapur towns of Ayodhya district.

=== Railway ===
Goshainganj, Ayodhya Junction, Ayodhya Cantt, Bharatkund and Chaure Bazar are the nearby railway stations from Maya Bazar (Ayodhya).

=== Air ===
Ayodhya International Airport is the nearest airport to Maya Bazar.
