= Darwan Lake =

- Location within Uttar Pradesh
- Location: Ambedkar Nagar district, Uttar Pradesh, India
- Coordinates: 26°31′53″N 82°26′16″E
- Type: Natural lake
- Basin countries: India
- Max. depth: 38 ft (12 m)
- Surface elevation: 870 ft (270 m)

Darwan Lake is located in Ambedkar Nagar district, Uttar Pradesh, India
