= Godaan Express =

Train in India

Godan Express

Overview
- Service type: Express
- Locale: Uttar Pradesh, Madhya Pradesh & Maharashtra
- First service: 23 December 2001; 24 years ago
- Current operator: Central Railway

Route
- Termini: Mumbai LTT (LTT); Gonda Junction (GD)
- Stops: 24
- Distance travelled: 1,878 km (1,167 mi)
- Average journey time: 36 hours 10 minutes
- Service frequency: 4 Days a week
- Train number: 11055 / 11056

On-board services
- Classes: AC 2 Tier, AC 3 Tier, Sleeper Class, General Unreserved
- Seating arrangements: Yes
- Sleeping arrangements: Yes
- Catering facilities: On-board catering, E-catering
- Observation facilities: Large windows
- Baggage facilities: No
- Other facilities: Below the seats

Technical
- Rolling stock: LHB coach
- Track gauge: 1,676 mm (5 ft 6 in)
- Operating speed: 52 km/h (32 mph) average including halts.
Route map
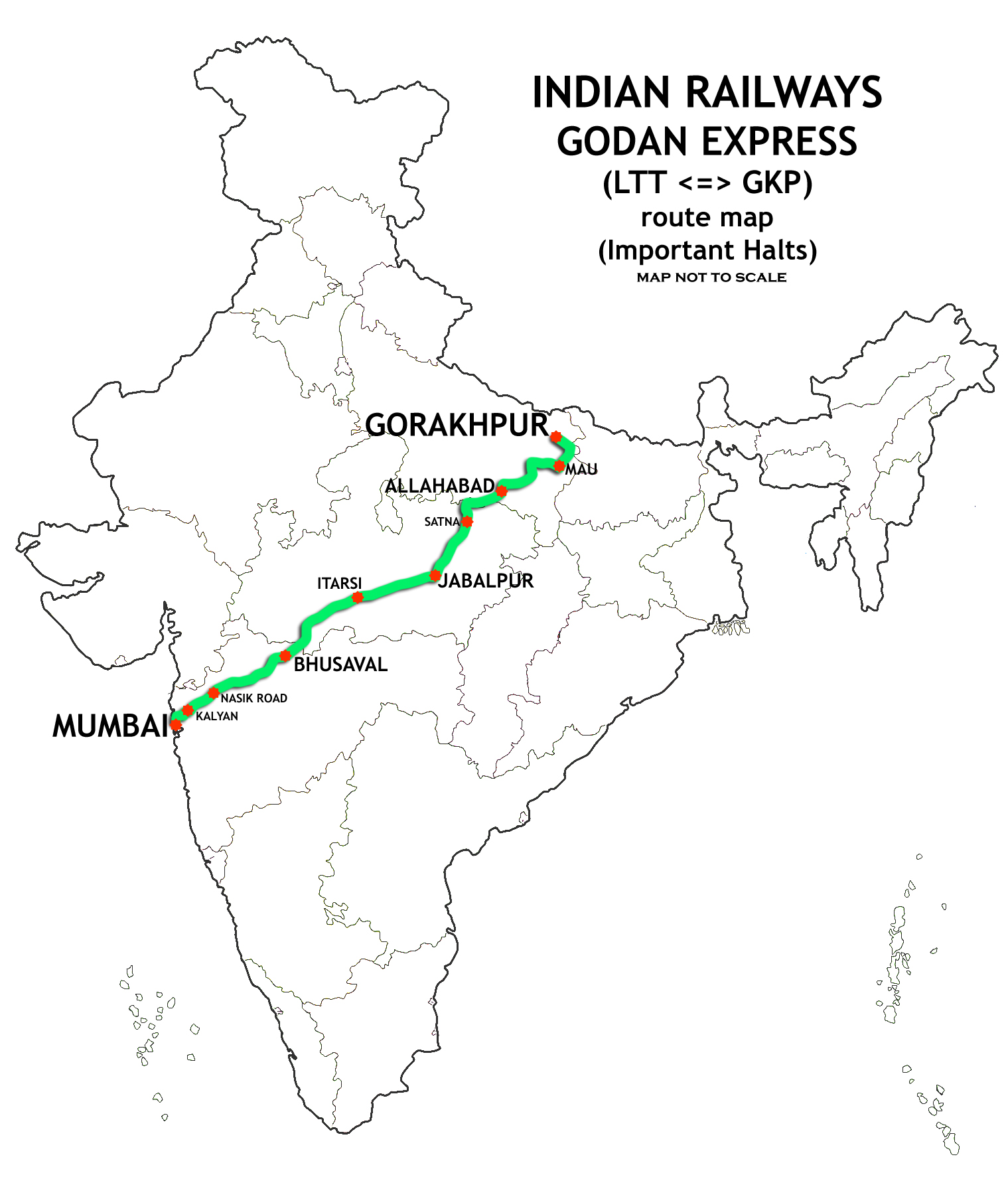

The 11055 / 11056 Godan Express is an express train of the Indian Railways. It runs between Lokmanya Tilak Terminus, Mumbai, the capital city of Maharashtra and Gonda Junction of Uttar Pradesh. Godan Express was inaugurated on 23 December 2001.

The name Godaan, came from writer Premchand's novel Godaan. Azmi and Rabindranath Tagore are the only others, a poet and a writer, who have trains dedicated to them (Geetanjali Express) and Premchand (Godaan Express).

== Locomotive ==
- WAP-7 electric locomotive of KYN / AQ / ET Loco Shed:- Lokmanya Tilak Terminus to Gonda Junction
- Godan Express undergoes loco reversal at Prayagraj Junction.

== Average speed ==
- 11055DN- 54 km/h
- 11056UP- 55 km/h

== RSA - Rake Sharing Arrangement ==
This Train shares Rake with 11059/11060 Chhapra Express

== Coach composition ==
The train consists of a total number of 22 Coaches as follows:

- 1 AC II Tier
- 7 AC III Tier
- 9 Sleeper Class
- 3 Unreserved
- 1 Passenger cum Luggage van
- 1 Eog

Loco	1	2	3	4	5	6	7	8	9	10	11	12	13	14	15	16	17	18	19	20	21	22
	SLR	D3	D2	A1	B7	B6	B5	B4	B3	B2	B1	S9	S8	S7	S6	S5	S4	S3	S2	S1	D1	EOG

== See also ==
- Chhapra Express
