= Akbarpur Junction railway station =

Railway station in Uttar Pradesh, India

Akbarpur Junction
- Indian Railways logo

General information
- Location: Akbarpur, Ambedkar Nagar district, Uttar Pradesh, India
- Coordinates: 26.4298°N 82.5389°E
- System: Light rail & Commuter rail station
- Owner: Ministry of Railways (India)
- Operator: Indian Railways
- Line: Varanasi–Jaunpur–Ayodhya–Lucknow Line NTPC Tanda Line
- Platforms: 3
- Tracks: 7
- Connections: Central bus station, Taxi stand, Auto stand

Construction
- Structure type: At grade
- Parking: Available
- Cycle facilities: Available
- Accessible: Disabled access

Other information
- Status: Active
- Station code: ABP
- Zone(s): Northern Railway
- Division(s): Lucknow NR
- Fare zone: Northern Railways

History
- Opened: 1873; 153 years ago
- Rebuilt: Under progress
- Electrified: Double electrified track

Passengers
- 15000/day

Services
Waiting room, Dormitory/Retiring rooms, Baggage room, Refreshment, ATM, Parking
Location
- Location within India Location within Uttar Pradesh

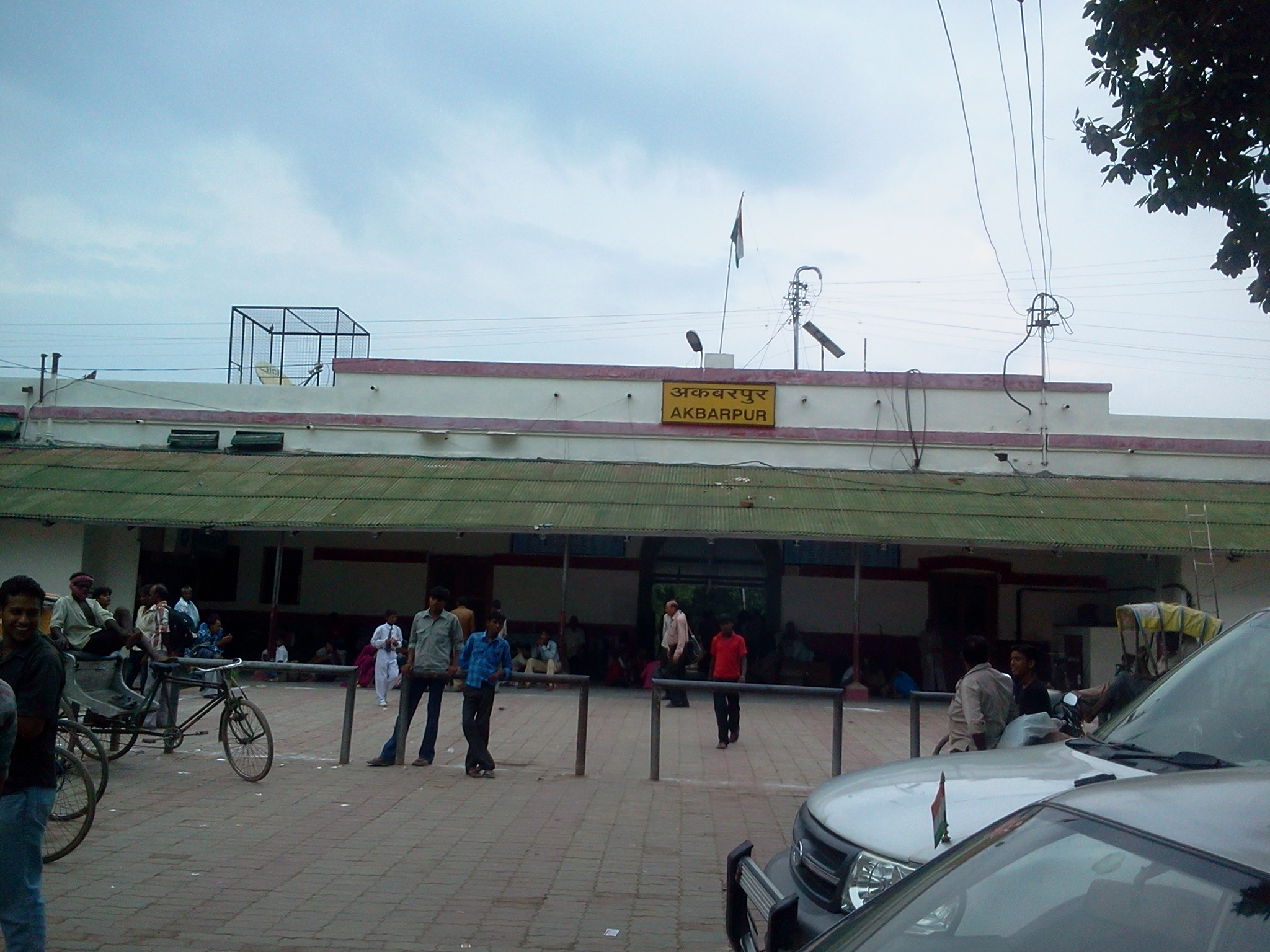

Akbarpur Junction railway station is a railway station between Lucknow, Ayodhya, and Varanasi. It serves Akbarpur city. Railway stations near Akbarpur are Shahganj Junction (SHG), Jaunpur Junction (JNU), Goshainganj (GGJ), Malipur (MLPR) and Bilwai (BWI). This station is under Redevelopment.

Station consists of a double line electrified track.

the Akbarpur junction to Goshaiganj railway station doubling and electrification was completed on 25 July 2022.

Jaunpur to Tanda NTPC doubling and electrification was scheduled to be completed by December 2022.

A passenger train from Tanda to Varanasi junction via Akbarpur junction was scheduled to be operational after doubling and electrification are complete.

== Tanda track ==
A single track line from NTPC Tanda via Tanda City joins the main line at Akbarpur station. The Tanda track is occupied by goods trains that supply coal and other goods to Tanda City and Tanda Thermal Power Plant. A service for passenger trains from Akbarpur Junction to Tanda City is under consideration.

== See also ==
- Goshainganj railway station
- Ayodhya Junction railway station
- Lucknow Charbagh railway station
- Varanasi Junction railway station
- Jaunpur Junction railway station
