= Shahganj Junction railway station =

Railway station in Uttar Pradesh, India

Shahganj Junction शाहगंज जंक्शन, شاہ گنج جنکشن
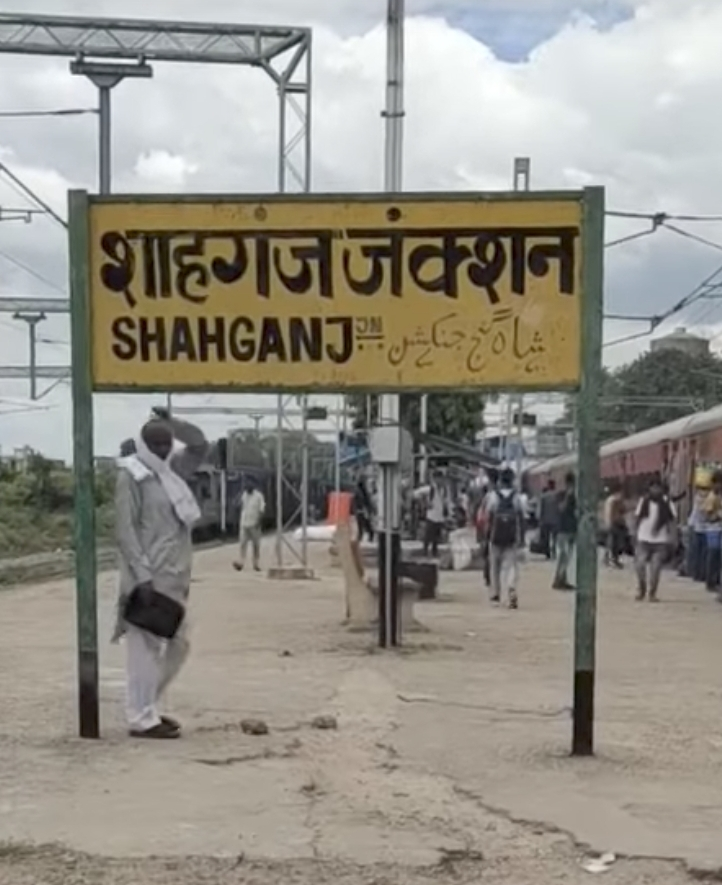

General information
- Location: Ayodhya Jaunpur Rd, Shahganj, Jaunpur District, Uttar Pradesh, 223101. India
- Coordinates: 26.061146°N 82.679922°E
- Elevation: 90 metres (300 ft)
- System: Indian Railways station
- Owner: Indian Railways
- Operator: Northern Railways
- Lines: Varanasi Lucknow Line via Ayodhya, Shahganj Ballia Line via Mau
- Platforms: 4 Functional + 2 Under construction
- Tracks: 6

Construction
- Structure type: Standard (on ground station)
- Parking: Available
- Accessible: Yes

Other information
- Status: Functioning
- Station code: SHG
- Zone(s): Northern Railway zone
- Division(s): Lucknow NR

Passengers
- More than 1,50,000/day

Services
Location
- Location within Uttar Pradesh Location within India

Shahganj Junction Railway Station is a NSG-3 category railway station located in Shahganj town, Jaunpur, Uttar Pradesh. It is the largest and busiest railway station in Jaunpur District, followed by the Jaunpur Junction Railway Station. It falls under the Northern Railway zone's Lucknow railway division. The station code is SHG. The station has a total of four platforms as of 28 October 2024, with three more platforms under construction.

== Connectivity ==
The station caters to about 77 trains, It is connected to major cities such as Mumbai, New Delhi, Ballia, Ayodhya, Varanasi, Lucknow, Chhapra, Mau, Surat, Jammu, Jodhpur, Ahmedabad, Gonda, Azamgarh, Patna, Howrah, Gorakhpur, Amritsar, Darbhanga, Ajmer, Kolkata and more.

Various important and significant trains have stoppages on Shahganj Junction Railway Station, a list of a few such trains is given below :

13435/13436 : Malda Town - Gomti Nagar Amrit Bharat Express

22103/22104 : Ayodhya Cantt. – Mumbai LTT Superfast Express

12225/12226 : Kaifiyaat Superfast Express

19045/19046 : Tapti Ganga Express

11055/11056 : Godaan Express
