= Goshainganj railway station =

Railway station in Uttar Pradesh, India

Goshainganj
- Indian Railways logo

General information
- Location: Goshainganj, Ayodhya district, Uttar Pradesh, India
- Coordinates: 26.5700674°N 82.3838882°E
- System: Light rail & Commuter rail station
- Owner: Ministry of Railways, Indian Railways
- Line: Varanasi–Jaunpur–Ayodhya–Lucknow line
- Platforms: 3
- Tracks: 5
- Connections: Bus stand, Taxi stand, Auto stand

Construction
- Structure type: Standard on-ground station
- Parking: Available
- Cycle facilities: Available

Other information
- Station code: GGJ
- Fare zone: Northern Railways

History
- Opened: 1873; 153 years ago
- Rebuilt: undergoing

Passengers
- 10000

Services
Waiting Room, ATM
Location
- Location within India Location within Uttar Pradesh

Goshainganj railway station is a railway station between Lucknow and Varanasi railway route in Goshainganj, Ayodhya district in Uttar Pradesh, India.

== Services ==
There are about 31 trains which pass via Goshainganj out of which following 20 trains halt here.

- Varanasi–Bareilly Express (14235/14236)
- Utsarg Express (18191/18192)
- Doon Express (13009/13010)
- Farakka Express (via Sultanpur) (13483/13484)
- Ganga Sutlej Express (13307/13308)
- Kolkata–Jammu Tawi Express (13151/13152)
- Ahmedabad–Darbhanga Sabarmati Express (19165/19166)
- Ahmedabad–Varanasi Sabarmati Express (19167/19168)
- Sadbhavna Express (via Ayodhya) (14017/14018)
- 14853/Marudhar Express (via Ayodhya) – Varanasi/BSB to Jodhpur

== See also ==
- Akbarpur Junction
- Ayodhya Junction
- Lucknow Charbagh railway station
- Jaunpur Junction
- Varanasi Junction
