= Al Haymah Al Kharijiyah district =

- District
- Location in Yemen
- Coordinates: 15°05′N 43°50′E
- Country: Yemen
- Governorate: Sana'a

Population (2003)
  - Total: 58,454
- Time zone: UTC+3 (Yemen Standard Time)

Al Haymah Al Kharijiyah district (Arabic: مديرية الحيمة الخارجية) is a district of the Sana'a Governorate, Yemen. As of 2003, the district had a population of 58,454 inhabitants.
