= Panki, Kanpur =

Panki, Kanpur Panki
- suburb
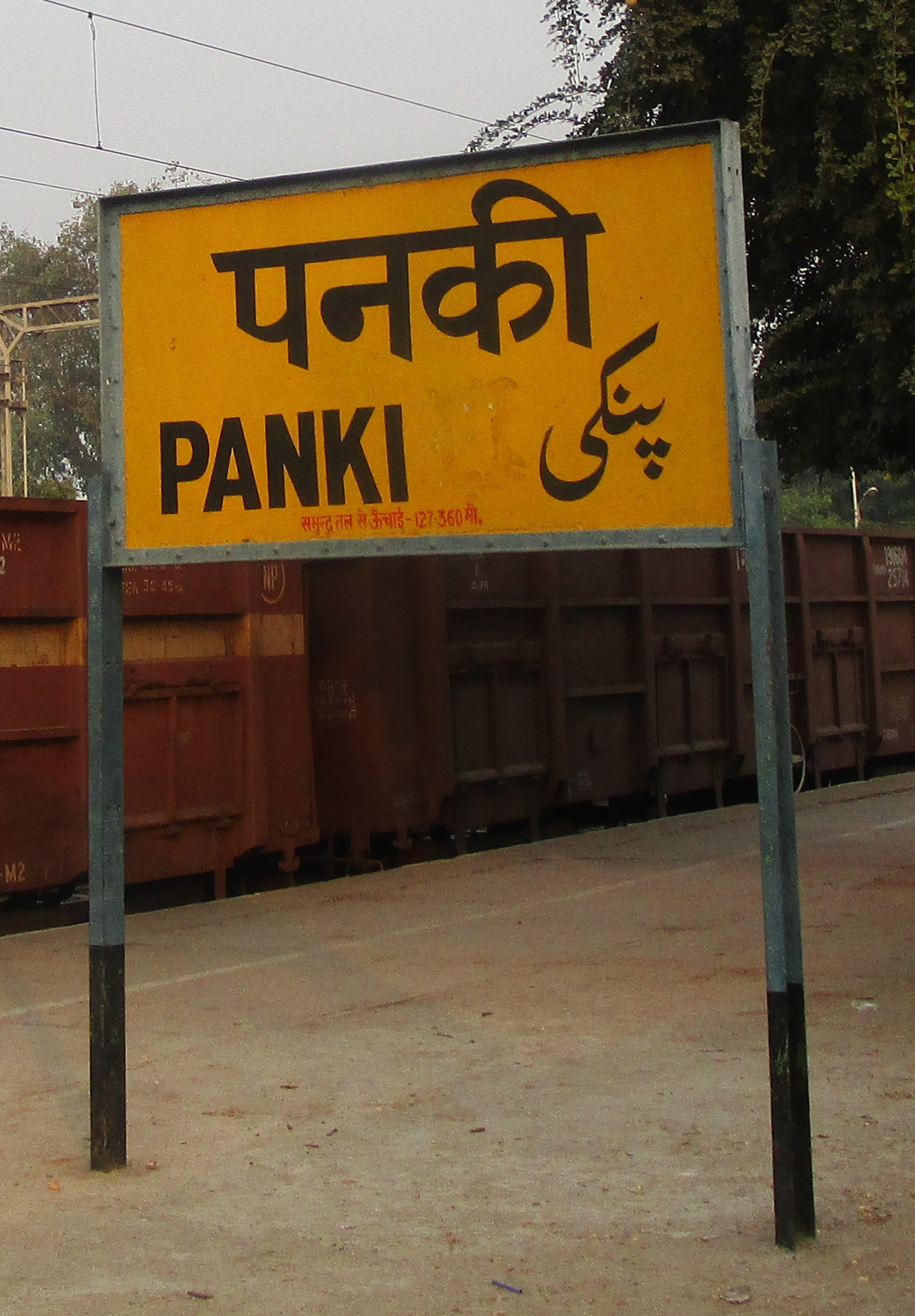
- Panki railway station nameplate

- Location in Uttar Pradesh adesh, India
- Coordinates: 26.371150°N 80.112400°E
- Country: India
- State: Uttar Pradesh
- District: Kanpur Nagar

Population
  - Total: 5,000

Languages
  - Official: Hindi
- Time zone: UTC+5:30 (IST)
- PIN: 208020
- Vehicle registration: UP-78
- Nearest city: Kanpur
- Literacy: 60%
- Lok Sabha constituency: Kanpur
- Vidhan Sabha constituency: Govind Nagar, Kalyanpur, Akbarpur-Rania

Panki is a suburb of metropolitan Kanpur, Uttar Pradesh, India, situated about 12 km from Kanpur Central on the NH 2 to Delhi. The region is home to the Panki Temple, to Panki Thermal Power Station which is among the few thermal energy units in Northern India, and to Panki Logistics Park which is among the largest logistics park of Northern India.

== Travel ==
Roadways

Panki has a bus station and Uttar Pradesh State Road Transport Corporation buses of Kanpur have routes from Sachendi to different localities.

Panki is also the starting point of Kanpur over-bridge which is one of the largest over-bridges in India.

Railways

Panki has a railway station on the Kanpur-Delhi line.

Airways

Kanpur Airport is the nearest airport.

Panki is inside the Kanpur municipal limits and is about 12 km from the Kanpur railway station and main bus stand. The place has an electric power generating station, which supplies to the northern grid. Panki has a temple of Hanuman.

== Train accident ==
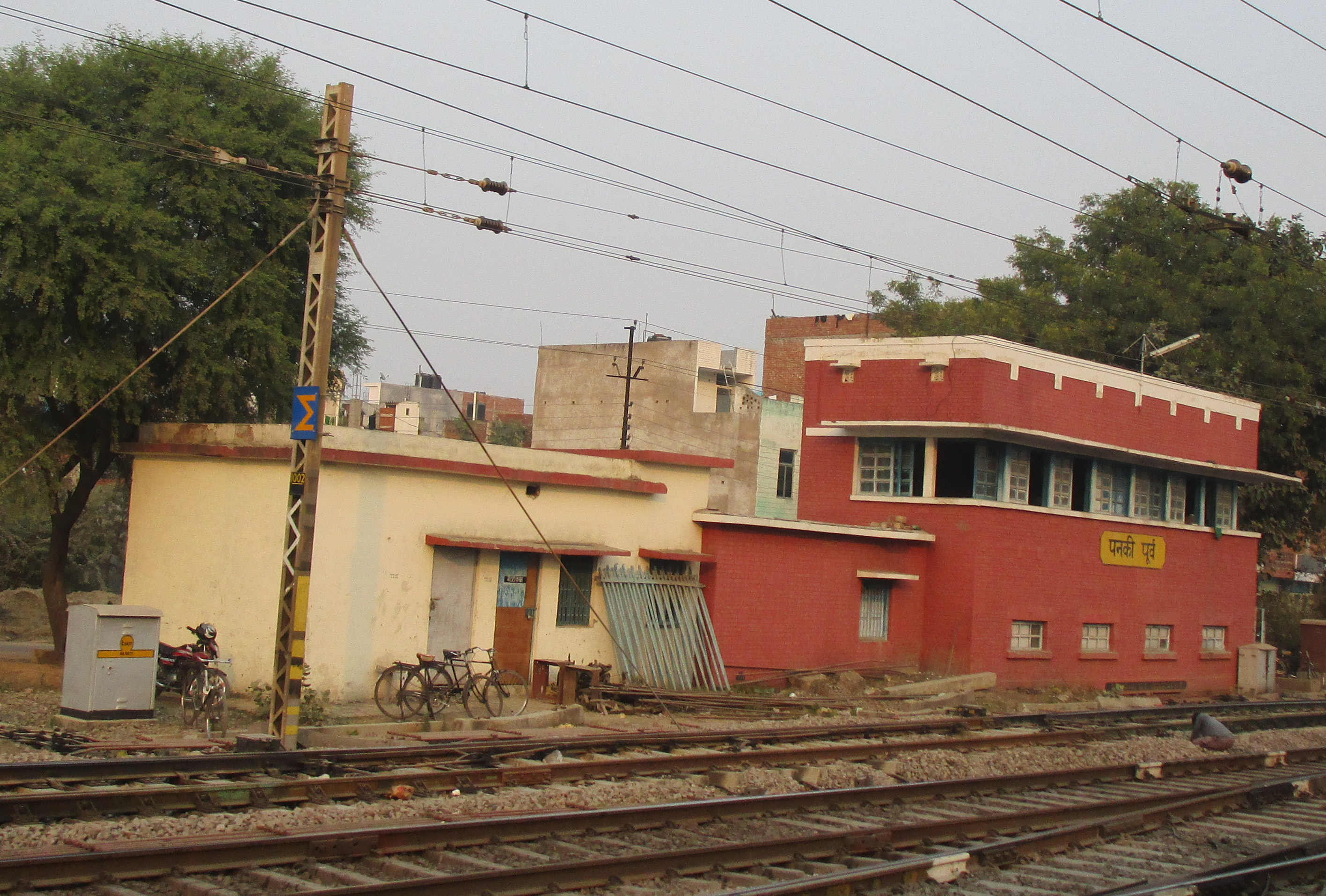
Panki railway station east building at Kanpur district.

At Panki Railway Station the Gorakhdham Express rammed into the Prayagraj Express on 2 January 2010. Ten people were killed.
