= Lucknow Junction–Anand Vihar Terminal Double Decker Express =

Lucknow Jn. – Anand Vihar Terminal AC Double Decker Express
- Train name board of the Inaugural Special

Overview
- Service type: Double Decker
- Locale: Uttar Pradesh & Delhi
- First service: 26 April 2015
- Current operator: North Eastern Railways

Route
- Termini: Lucknow Junction (LJN); Anand Vihar Terminal (ANVT)
- Stops: 3
- Distance travelled: 479 km (298 mi)
- Average journey time: 8 hrs 20 mins
- Service frequency: 4 days a week
- Train number: 12583 / 12584

On-board services
- Class: AC Chair Car
- Seating arrangements: Yes
- Sleeping arrangements: No
- Catering facilities: On-board catering, E-catering

Technical
- Rolling stock: LHB Double Decker
- Track gauge: 1,676 mm (5 ft 6 in) broad gauge
- Operating speed: 58 km/h (36 mph) average including halts

The 12583 / 12584 Lucknow Jn.–Anand Vihar Terminal AC Double Decker Express is an Indian Railways train running between Lucknow Junction and Anand Vihar Terminal. It is the ninth double decker train in India and is the first such service for the state of Uttar Pradesh. The train operates four days a week on Tuesdays, Thursdays, Fridays and Sundays from both ends. After Lucknow Mail, Lucknow–New Delhi AC Superfast Express, Lucknow Swarna Shatabdi Express and Gomti Express, it is the fifth dedicated train service between the national capital and the state capital of Uttar Pradesh. The other train service is by IRCTC by the name of Lucknow - New Delhi Tejas Express.

== Trials and Clearance Certificate ==
The rake for this train was procured by North Eastern Railways, Lucknow Division from the Rail Coach Factory, Kapurthala on 21 April 2014. The first trials of the train on its route were carried out on 18 October 2014. The train departed from Lucknow Jn. at 10 AM and reached Anand Vihar Terminal within 7 hours 40 minutes. While the trials were mostly successful, on its way back, the train brushed against the wall of a platform at Moradabad Jn forcing the station authorities to modify a part of the platform. Followed by this, rigorous trials at all platforms of Lucknow Junction railway station were carried out the following day. Finally the safety clearance from Research Design and Standards Organisation (RDSO) was given and the train chugged off after four months.

== Inauguration ==
This train service was flagged off on 26 April 2015 from the Anand Vihar Terminal by the Union Home minister Mr. Rajnath Singh in the presence of the Union Railway Minister Mr.Suresh Prabhu and the Minister of State for Railways, Mr. Manoj Sinha. Nearly 650 people travelled in the inaugural run of this train.

Lucknow Double Decker being flagged-off from Anand Vihar Terminal

== Journey ==
The train starts from Lucknow Junction at 04:55 hrs and reaches Anand Vihar Terminal at 12:55 hrs, the same day. In return the train starts back at 14:05 from Anand Vihar Terminal to reach back Lucknow Jn at 22:30 the same day. The Time table is as follows:

12583 Lucknow Junction NER to Anand Vihar Terminal

Station code	Station name	Arrival	Departure
LJN	Lucknow Jn NER	Starting station	04:55
BE	Bareilly Junction	08:23	08:25
MB	Moradabad	10:00	10:08
GZB	Ghaziabad Junction	12:22	12:23
ANVT	Anand Vihar Terminal	12:55	Destination station

12584 Anand Vihar Terminal to Lucknow Jn NER

Station code	Station name	Arrival	Departure
ANVT	Anand Vihar Terminal	Starting station	14:05
GZB	Ghaziabad Junction	14:33	14:35
MB	Moradabad	16:50	16:58
BE	Bareilly Junction	18:22	18:24
LJN	Lucknow Jn NER	22:30	Destination station

== Introduction of catering services ==
In a response to the numerous complaints from passengers pertaining to unavailability of catering services and buffet car in the train, North Eastern Railways consented to initiate the facility with effect from 17 July 2015. Vendors providing lunch, dinner, beverages, drinking water and snacks are now available aboard. E-catering service is yet to be introduced.

== Coach composition ==
The train was inaugurated and further planned to run with twelve Double Decked LHB AC Chair Car coaches, but due to technical reasons, the composition was revised to ten such coaches and two generator cum luggage vans at each end. Each coach has a sitting capacity of 120 passengers. The coach composition was again revised on 29 July 2018, when 2 AC Double Decker Chair Car Coaches were removed and sent for repairs. As of now, the trains runs with a 10 coach composition, with 2 EOGs and 8 AC Double Decker Chair Car Coaches, headed by a Ghaziabad Shed Electric Loco WAP-7 or WAP-4 (Earlier was WDP-3A).

The coach composition is as follows:
12583: LOCO-EOG-C1-C2-C3-C4-C5-C6-C7-C8-EOG
12584: LOCO-EOG-C8-C7-C6-C5-C4-C3-C2-C1-EOG

Here 'LOCO' denotes the direction of the locomotive. 'EOG' stands for End-On-Generator Van and C1 through C10 are AC Chair Car Coaches. The rake is non-self-generating LHB type and the maximum permissible speed of the rolling stock is 160 kmph though due to sectional speed restrictions, the train only touches a maximum speed of 110 kmph.

== Quota allocation ==
The figures mentioned denote the total number of seats available for booking in this train from the mentioned station under the respective quotas. The bookings can be made from the official ticketing site of Indian Railways http://irctc.co.in .

12583 Lucknow Jn NER to Anand Vihar Terminal

Source station	General quota	Tatkal quota	Premium Tatkal quota	Ladies quota	Foreign Tourist quota
Lucknow Junction	985	120	N.A.	N.A.	N.A.
Bareilly Jn	985	120	N.A.	N.A.	N.A.
Moradabad Jn	985	120	N.A.	N.A.	N.A.
Ghaziabad Jn	985	120	N.A.	N.A.	N.A.

12584 Anand Vihar Terminal to Lucknow Jn NER

Source station	General quota	Tatkal quota	Premium Tatkal quota	Ladies quota	Foreign Tourist quota
Anand Vihar Terminal	1053	60	N.A.	N.A.	N.A.
Ghaziabad Jn.	1053	60	N.A.	N.A.	N.A.
Moradabad Jn	30	60	N.A.	N.A.	N.A.
Bareilly Jn	20	60	N.A.	N.A.	N.A.

== Extension and linkage to Jaipur-bound Double Decker service ==
Unavailability of pit lines for maintenance of the train at Lucknow Junction is posing difficulties in operation of the train on a daily basis. Hence it has been proposed to link the service to the Jaipur bound Double Decker Service from Delhi. The Ghaziabad–Delhi Sarai Rohilla section is currently being surveyed for feasibility of operation. With the change in place the timings may be changed to a 9AM departure from Lucknow and around 11AM departure from Delhi.

== Accidents ==
On 28 June 2015, the C-5 coach of the Anand Vihar bound train caught fire due to jamming of brakes to the wheels. The incident happened near Karuha station (9 km from Hardoi, 110 km from Lucknow Jn.). Though the incident was soon noticed and attended and hence no casualties were reported. After a delay of approximately two hours, the train was made to depart.

== Gallery ==
Lower Deck

Upper Deck

Decorated rake on Inaugural run

Departing from Moradabad PF-05
