= Shiv Ganga Express =

Train in India

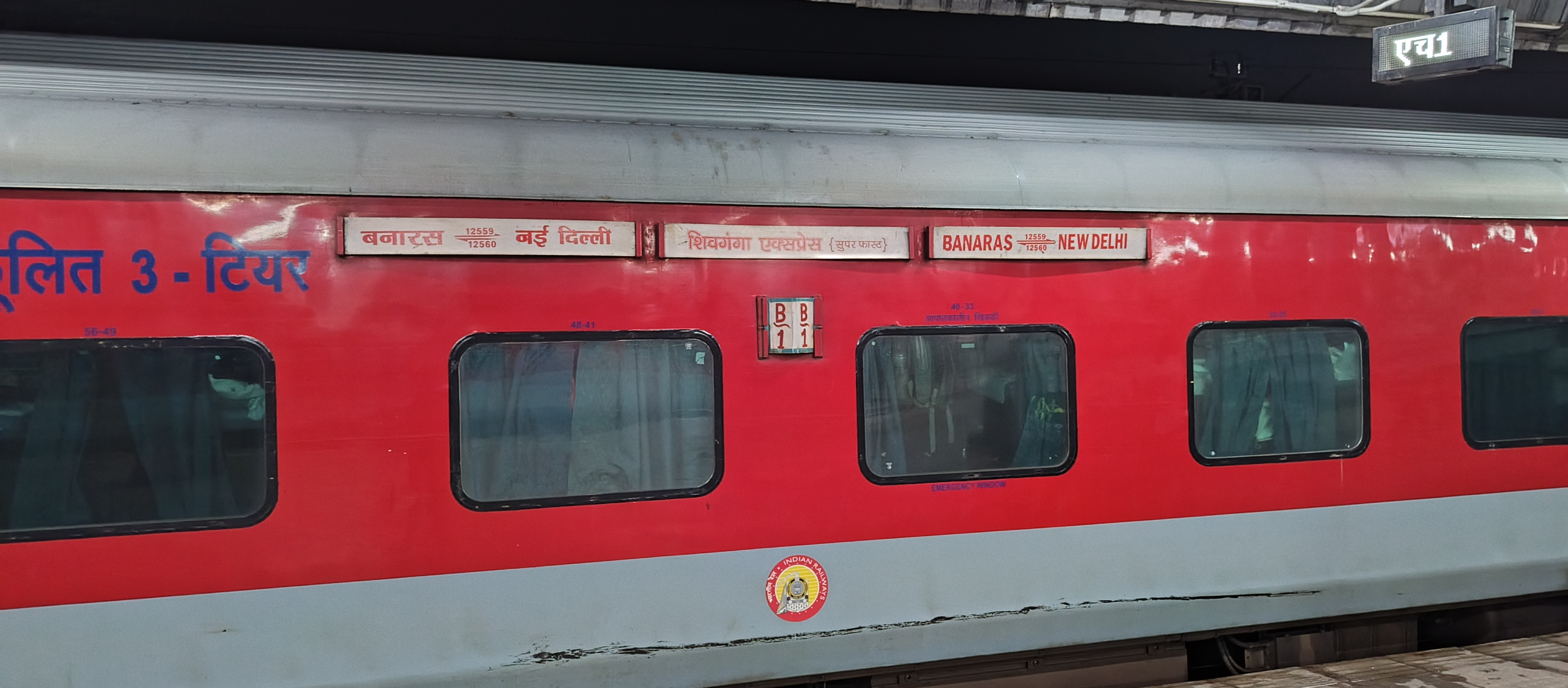
- Shiv Ganga Express at Prayagraj Jn.

Overview
- Service type: Superfast Express
- Locale: Delhi & Uttar Pradesh
- First service: 1 July 2002; 24 years ago
- Current operator: North Eastern Railway

Route
- Termini: Banaras (BNRS); New Delhi (NDLS)
- Stops: 5
- Distance travelled: 755 km (469 mi)
- Average journey time: 10 hours 10 minutes
- Service frequency: Daily
- Train number: 12559 / 12560

On-board services
- Classes: AC First Class, AC 2 Tier, AC 3 Tier, Sleeper Class, General Unreserved
- Seating arrangements: Yes
- Sleeping arrangements: Yes
- Catering facilities: On-board catering, E-catering
- Observation facilities: Large windows
- Baggage facilities: Available
- Other facilities: Below the seats

Technical
- Rolling stock: LHB coach
- Track gauge: 1,676 mm (5 ft 6 in)
- Operating speed: 75 km/h (47 mph) average including halts.

The 12559 / 12560 Shiva Ganga Express is a daily superfast express train of the North Eastern Railway Zone. It runs between Banaras and New Delhi, named after the two jewels of Varanasi: Shiva and the Ganges river.

The two main cities along the route are Prayagraj and Kanpur. It is the best train to travel from New Delhi to Banaras and vice versa. As of October 2025 Shivganga Express's timetable is scheduled to overtake 5+ premium SF and mail express trains and hence Shiv Ganga Express along with Lucknow Mail, Shram Shakti Express, Prayagraj Express and Shaan-e-Bhopal Express has highest priority all over the route.

In September 2017, a major disaster was averted by alert gangmen after the train was decoupled from the coaches.

== Gallery ==
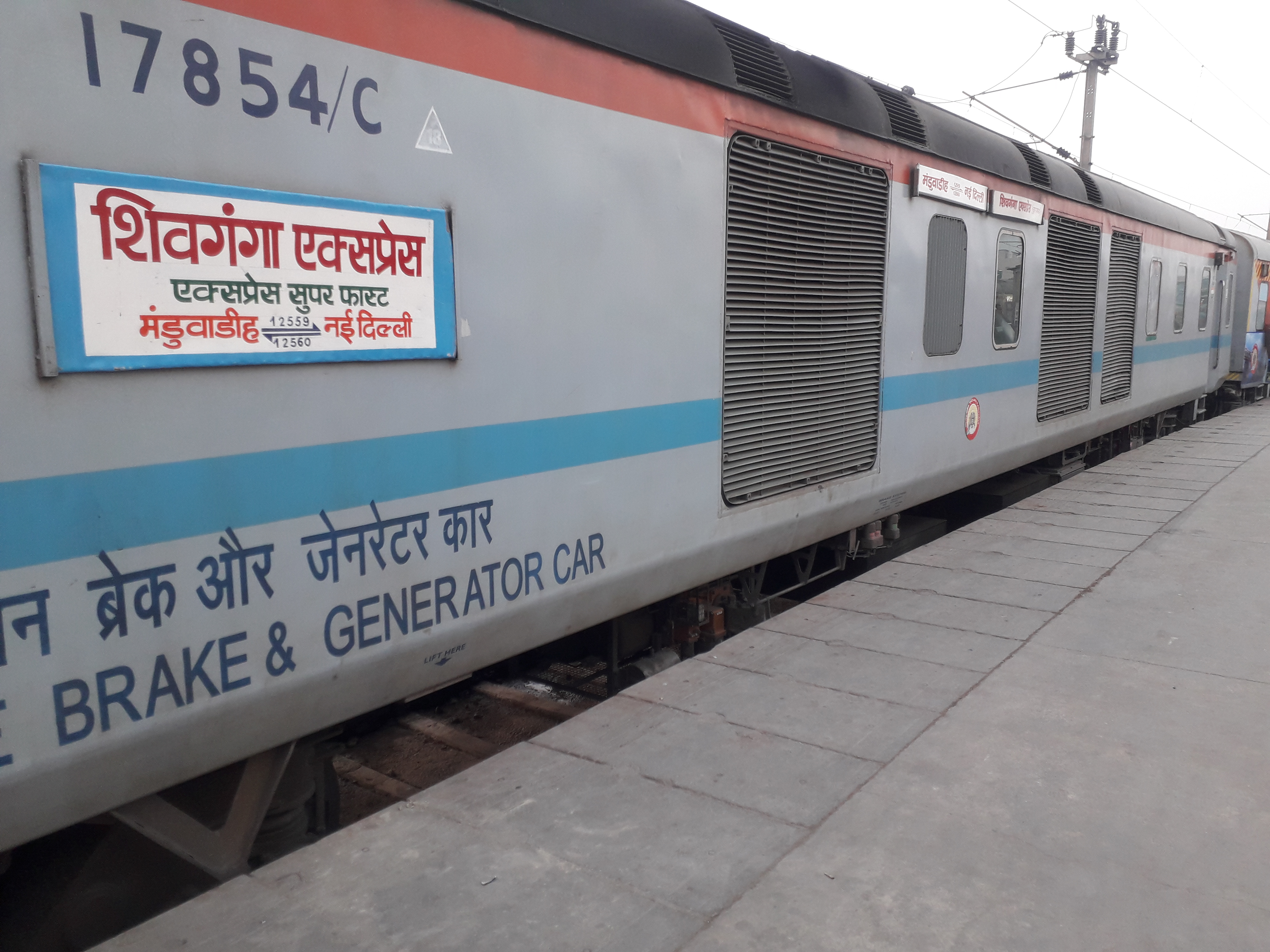
12560 Shiv Ganga Express – EOG

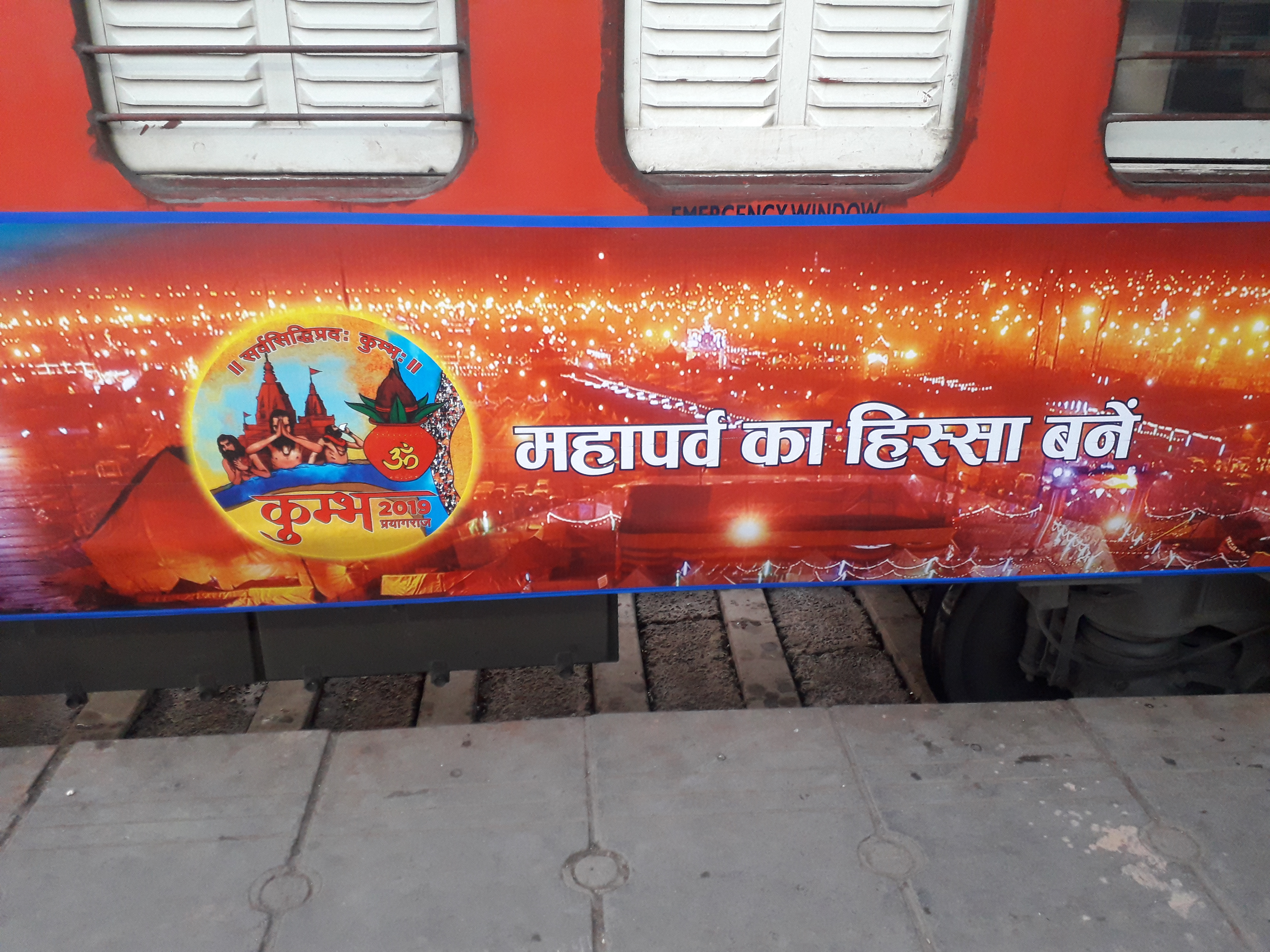
12560 Shiv Ganga Express – Sleeper Class coach with Prayagraj Kumbh 2019 decal

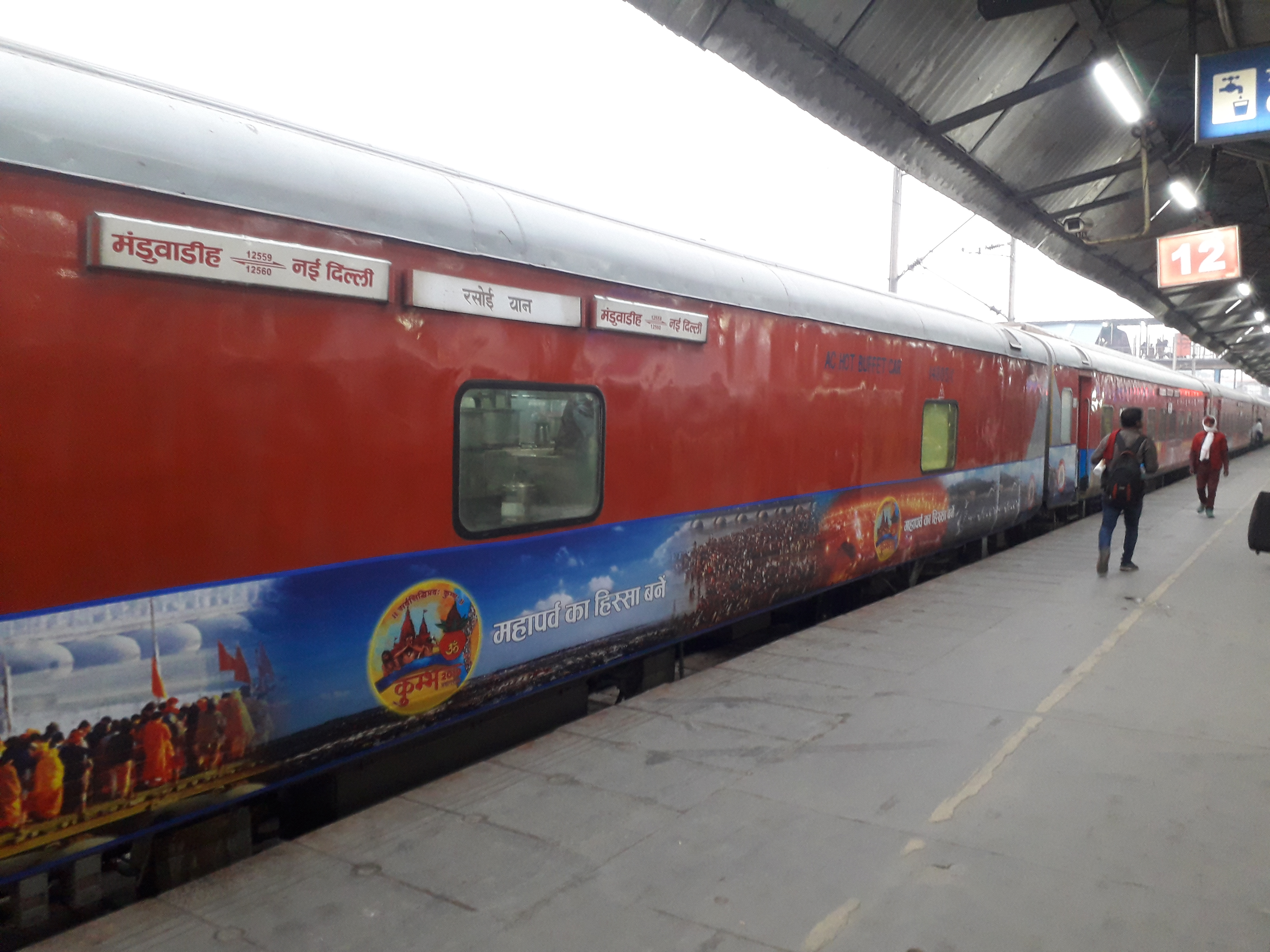
12560 Shiv Ganga Express – Pantry car coach with Prayagraj Kumbh 2019 decal

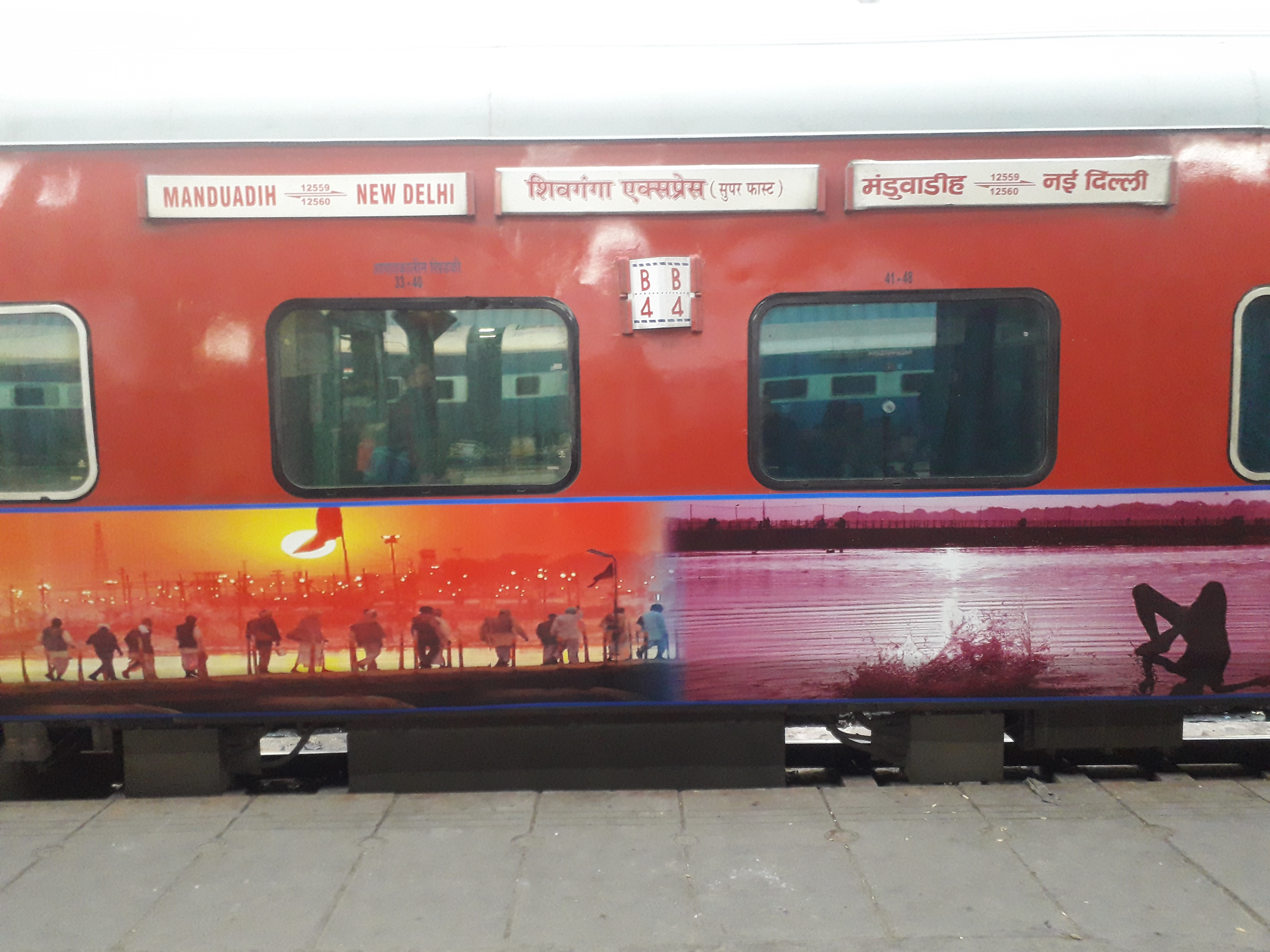
12560 Shiv Ganga Express – AC 3 tier coach with Prayagraj Kumbh 2019 decal

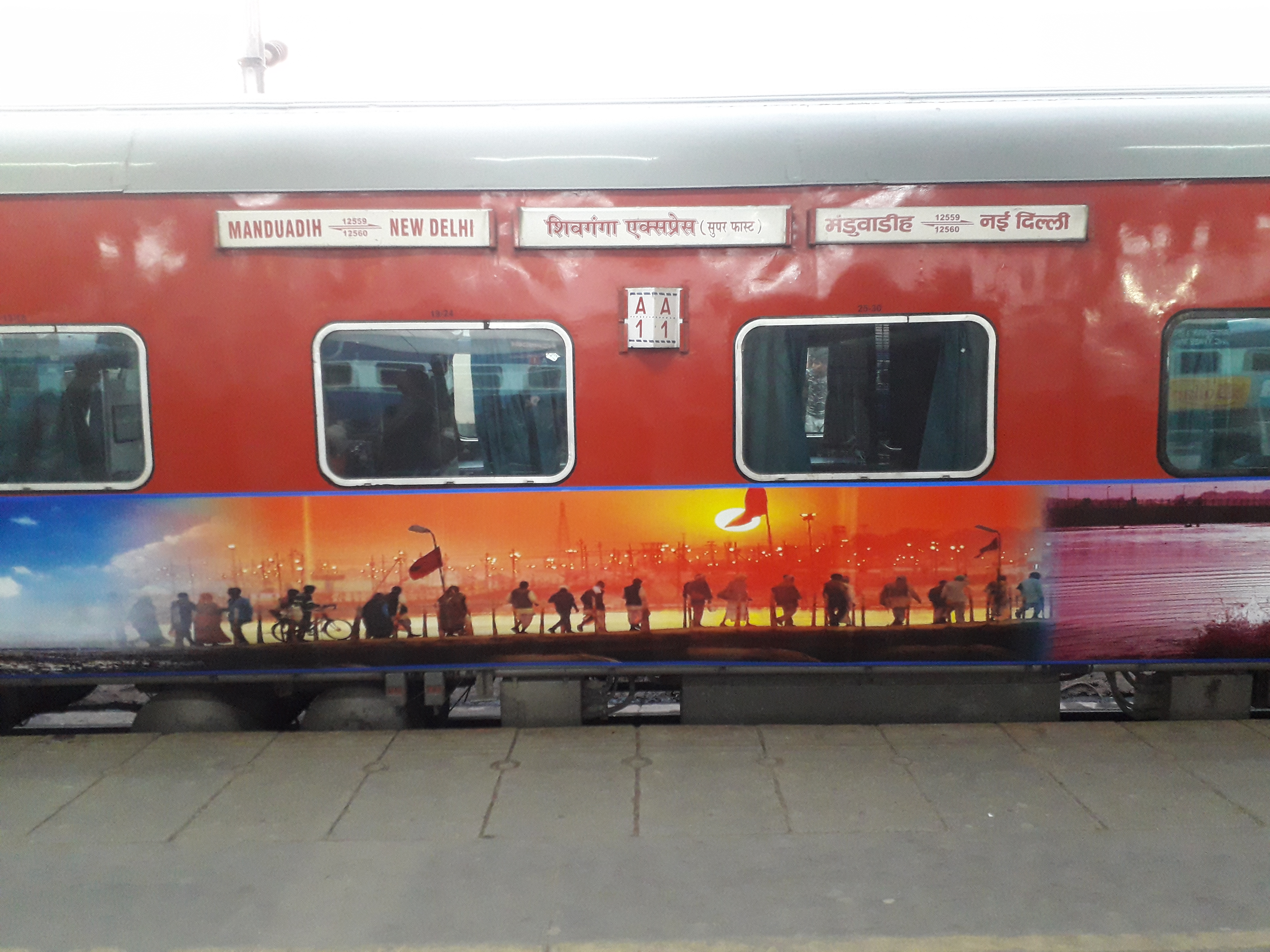
12560 Shiv Ganga Express – AC 2 tier coach with Prayagraj Kumbh 2019 decal

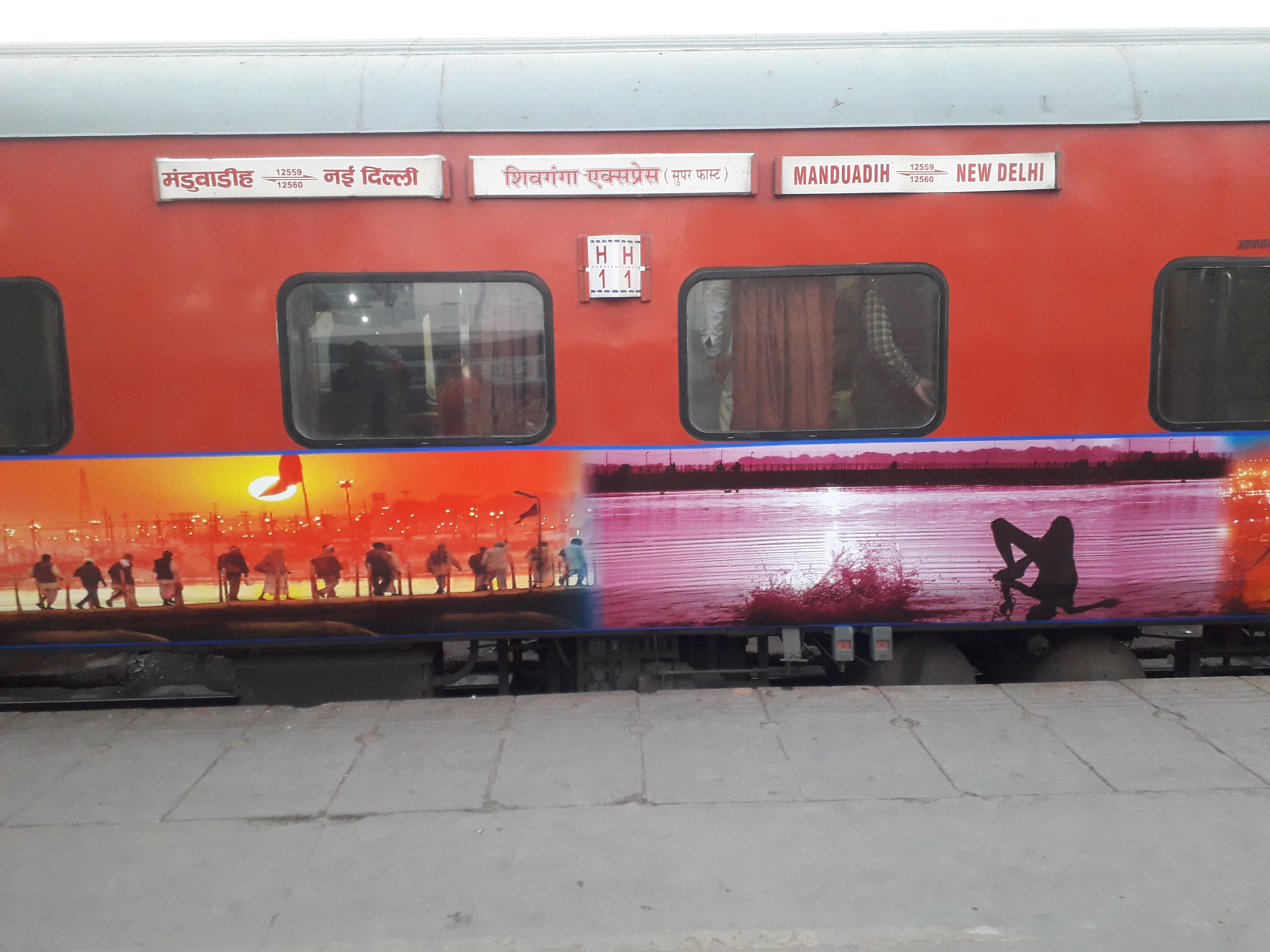
12560 Shiv Ganga Express – AC 1st Class coach with Prayagraj Kumbh 2019 decal

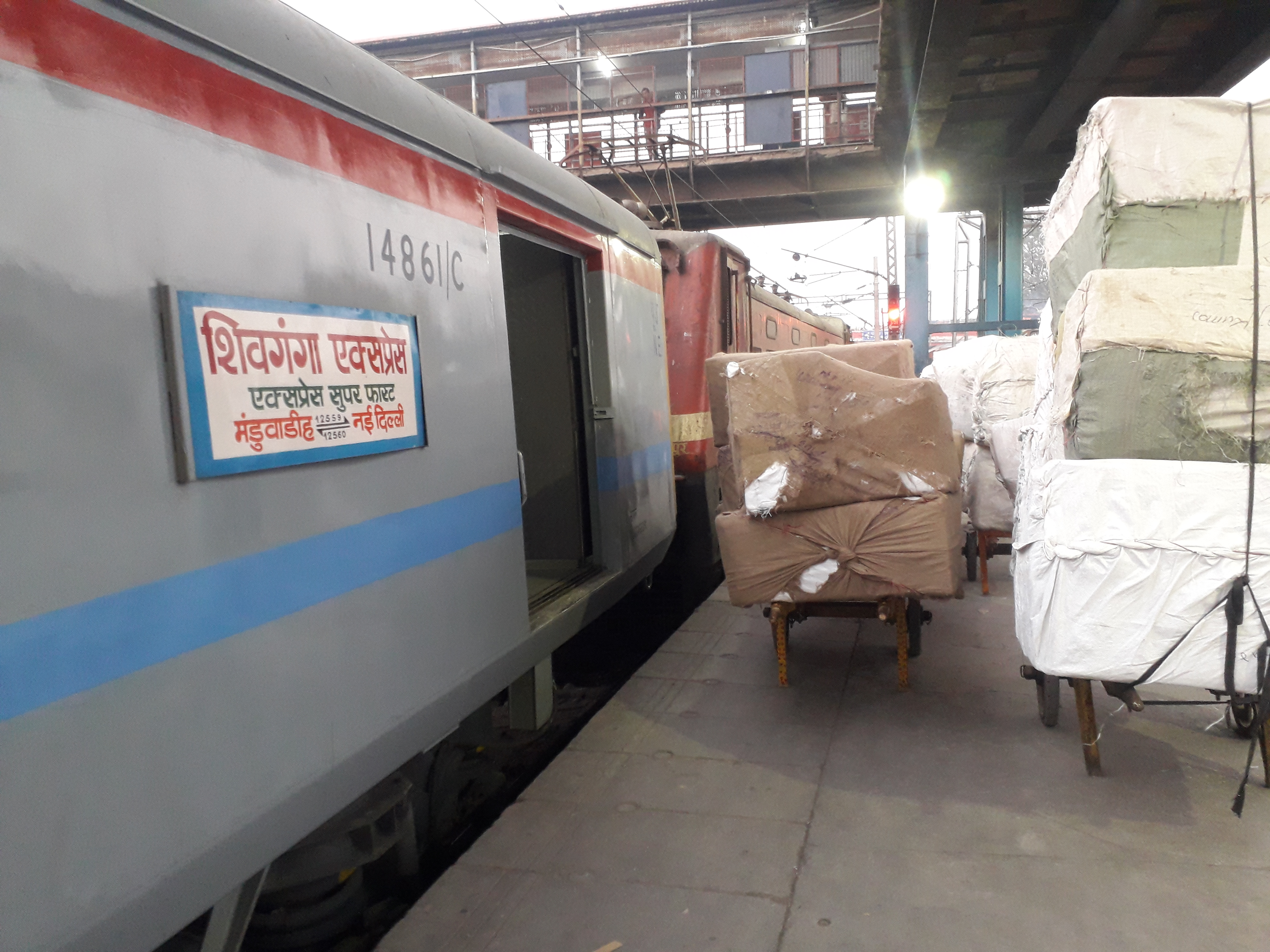
12560 Shiv Ganga Express – EOG with Kanpur-based WAP-4

== Time table ==
From Banaras to New Delhi it starts with number 12559 and time table is as:

S.No.	Station	Arrival	Departure	Halt (min.)	Day	Elevation
1	Banaras	Starting Station	22:15	–	1	80m
2	Gyanpur Road	23:02	23:04	2	1	92m
3	Prayagraj	00:30	00:35	5	2	100m
4	Kanpur Central	02:45	02:50	5	2	129m
5	New Delhi	08:25	Destination	–	2	216m

From New Delhi to Banaras it starts with number 12560 and time table is as:

S.No.	Station	Arrival	Departure	Halt (min.)	Day	Elevation
1	New Delhi	Starting Station	20:05	–	1	216m
2	Kanpur Central	01:00	01:05	5	2	129m
3	Prayagraj	03:45	03:55	10	2	100m
4	Gyanpur Road	05:00	05:02	2	2	92m
5	Banaras	06:10	Destination	–	2	80m

== Reservation ==
People have to take an advanced reservation ticket to travel in the train except for the general class. It records a rush of passengers throughout the year in both peak as well as non-peak period. Because of its comfortable time of arrival and departure, it is fairly popular among masses.

== Coach composition ==
This train has 22 coaches between Banaras Station to New Delhi station.

1 AC 1 Tier Coach (H1)
2 AC 2 Tier Coach (A1-A2)
9 AC 3 Tier Coach (B1-B9)
5 Sleeper class Coach (S1-S5)
3 General compartments (unreserved)
1 SLR
1 EOG

Coach composition for 12559 BSBS-NDLS Shiv Ganga Express:

Loco	1	2	3	4	5	6	7	8	9	10	11	12	13	14	-| 15	16	17	18	19	20	21	22	23
	HCPV	EOG	A1	A2	H1	B1	B2	B3	B4	B5	B6	B7	B8	B9	S1	S2	S3	S4	S5	UR	UR	UR	SLR

Coach composition for 12560 NDLS-BSBS Shiv Ganga Express:

Loco	1	2	3	4	5	6	7	8	9	10	11	12	13	14	15	16	17	18	19	20	21	22	23
	SLR	UR	UR	UR	S5	S4	S3	S2	S1	B9	B8	B7	B6	B5	B4	B3	B2	B1	H1	A2	A1	EOG	HCPV

== Journey ==
It takes around 10 hours 7 minutes to cover its journey of 755 kilometres (469 mi) with an average speed of 74.5 kilometres per hour (46.3 mph).

== See also ==
- Patna Express
- Neelachal Express
- Kanpur Shatabdi
- Gyan Ganga SF Express
- Banaras–New Delhi Superfast Express
- Kashi Vishwanath Express
