= Lucknow–New Delhi AC Superfast Express =

Overnight VIP express to New Delhi

Lucknow Charbagh – New Delhi AC Superfast Express

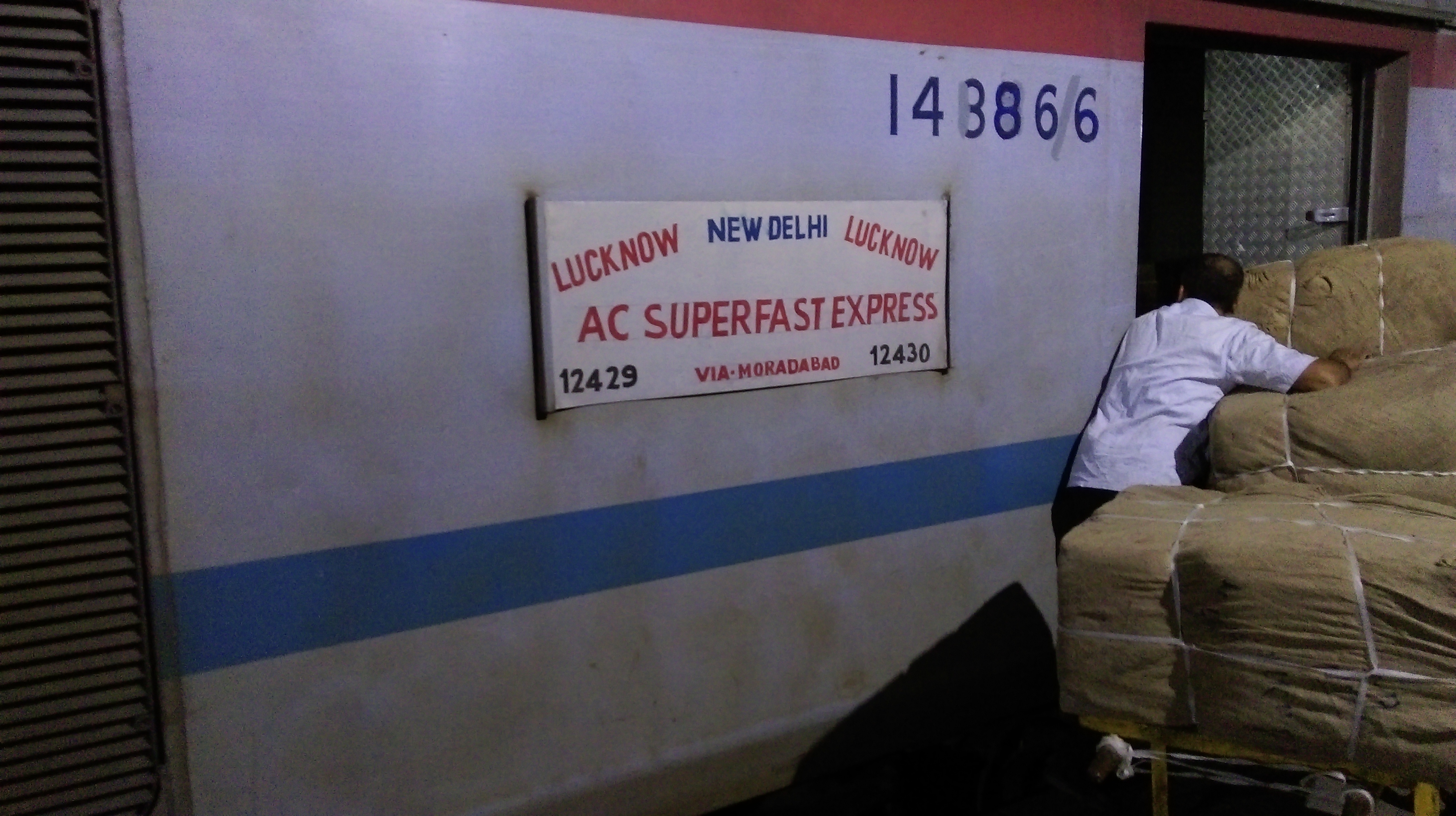

Overview
- Service type: AC Superfast Express
- Status: Operating
- Locale: Uttar Pradesh & Delhi
- First service: 15 June 2014; 12 years ago
- Current operator: Northern Railway zone

Route
- Termini: Lucknow Charbagh (LKO); New Delhi (NDLS)
- Stops: 4
- Distance travelled: 491 kilometres (305 mi)
- Average journey time: 8 hrs
- Service frequency: Daily
- Train numbers: 12429 & 12430

On-board services
- Classes: AC 1st Class; AC 2 Tier; AC 3 Tier; AC 3 Tier Economy
- Seating arrangements: No
- Sleeping arrangements: Available
- Auto-rack arrangements: No
- Catering facilities: No
- Observation facilities: Large windows
- Entertainment facilities: No
- Baggage facilities: Available

Technical
- Rolling stock: LHB coach
- Track gauge: 1,676 mm (5 ft 6 in)
- Operating speed: 100–110 kilometres per hour (62–68 mph)
Route map
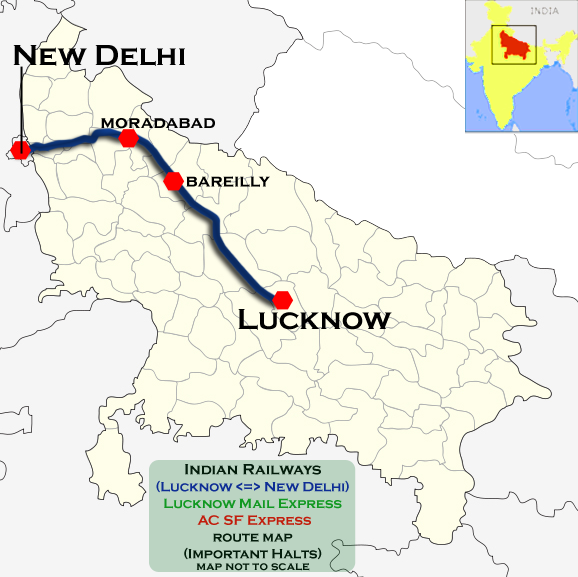
- Lucknow AC Superfast Express (Lucknow - New Delhi) route map

Lucknow–New Delhi AC Superfast Express numbered 12429/30 is an ISO certified premier daily overnight service of AC Superfast Express type running between Lucknow Charbagh and New Delhi operated by Northern Railway zone.

Owing to its suitable time and punctuality, it is considered more popular than Lucknow Mail as it runs on the same route as Lucknow Mail but takes 53 minutes less to complete the journey.

== Overview ==
This is a fully air conditioned Superfast train which connects the Indian capital, New Delhi to the state capital of Uttar Pradesh, Lucknow. It has been introduced in lieu of two trains (Lucknow–New Delhi AC Duronto Express & Lucknow–New Delhi AC Express) that have previously served Lucknow Charbagh & New Delhi from 15 June 2014. The train is the first train of Northern Railway zone after the New Delhi Lucknow Jn. Swarn Shatabdi Express to be operated on German Technology LHB coach from 12 April 2016.

As a result of addition of LHB Coaches, Lucknow–New Delhi AC Express (12429/12430) can now accommodate 960 passengers instead of 824. The number of seats in AC-2 coaches has been increased from 44 to 52, while in AC-3 coaches it has been raised from 64 to 72. The new coaches, based on a German technology LHB coach, are made of stainless steel which do not turn turtle during accidents. The light-weight coaches also improves the train's speed. Bigger windows, lamps at all seats and sound insulation are the other features. Waste from toilets would get discharged only when the train would be in motion.

Starting from 2021, AC 3 Tier Economy coaches were also added to the train composition to accommodate even more passengers. The train now has coaches from AC Sleeper I Tier, AC Sleeper II Tier, AC Sleeper III Tier and AC Sleeper III Tier Economy.

== Journey ==
The down train (#12430) departs New Delhi at 23:25 usually from Platform 10 and reaches Lucknow Charbagh at 07:25 the following morning. The up train (#12429) departs Lucknow Charbagh at 23:30 usually from Platform 1 and reaches New Delhi at 07:30 the following morning.

The timetable is as follows:

12429 Lucknow NR to New Delhi

Station Code	Station Name
LKO	Lucknow
SPN	Shahjahanpur
BE	Bareilly
MB	Moradabad
GZB	Ghaziabad Junction
NDLS	New Delhi

12430 Lucknow NR to New Delhi

Station Code	Station Name
NDLS	New Delhi
GZB	Ghaziabad Junction
MB	Moradabad
BE	Bareilly
SPN	Shahjahanpur
LKO	Lucknow

== Rakes ==
Coach composition (Note: The coach composition is subject to change.) are as follows for 12429:

Loco	1	2	3	4	5	6	7	8	9	10	11	12	13	14	15	16	17	18	19	20	21
	EOG	B1	B2	B3	B4	B5	B6	B7	B8	B9	M1	M2	M3	A1	A2	A3	A4	A5	A6	H1	EOG

And for 12430 it's the reverse.

== Locomotive ==
It is usually hauled by a Ghaziabad based Indian locomotive class WAP-7 locomotive, with occasional runs by WDP-4D twin locos of Tughlakabad or Alambagh shed, WAP5 Ghaziabad Shed, WAP4 Ghaziabad Shed and WAP1 Lucknow Shed.

== Gallery ==
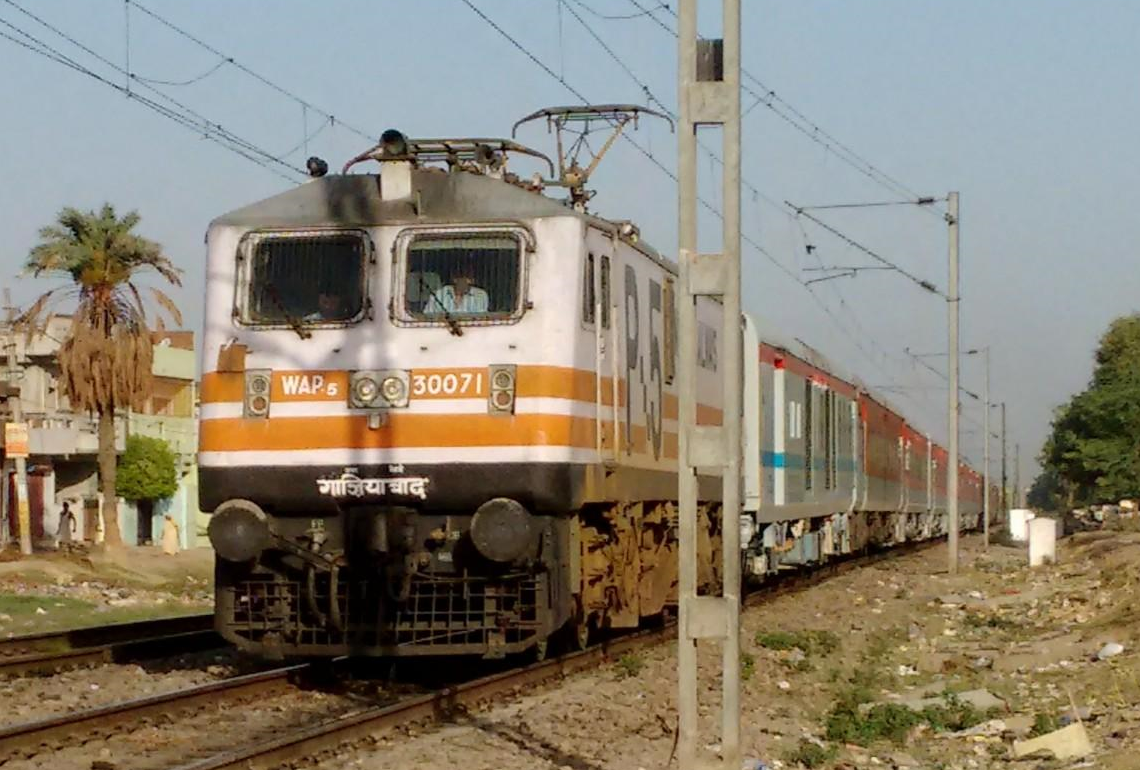
Lucknow AC being hauled by a Ghaziabad-based WAP-5 with LHB rake on first run

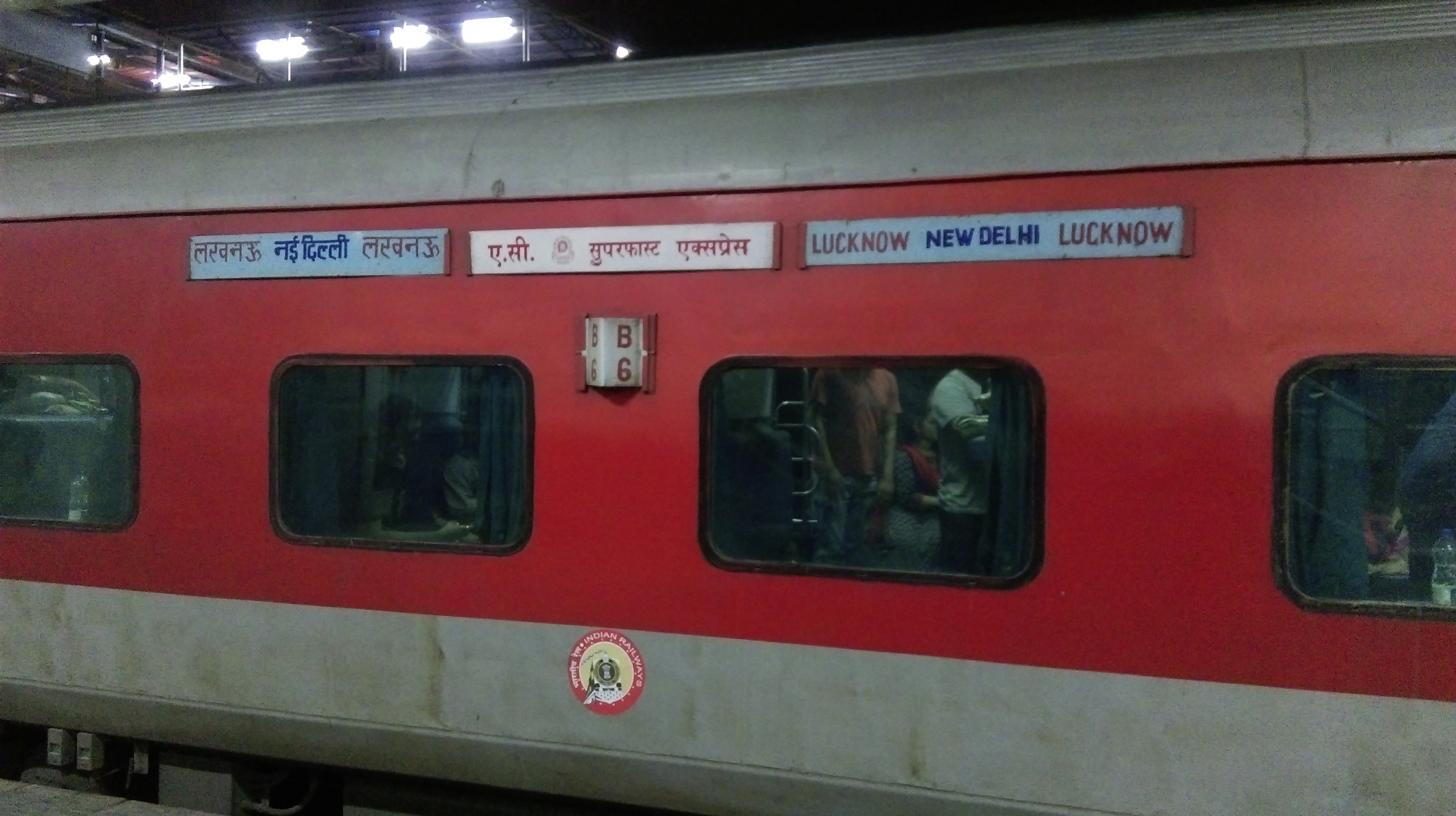
12430 Lucknow AC Superfast Express – AC 3 tier coach

== See also ==
- Lucknow Mail
- Lucknow Swarna Shatabdi Express
- Lucknow Junction–Anand Vihar Terminal Double Decker Express
- Gomti Express
- Lucknow–New Delhi Tejas Express
- Lucknow Charbagh railway station
