= Prayagraj Express =

Train in India

Prayagraj - New Delhi Superfast Express
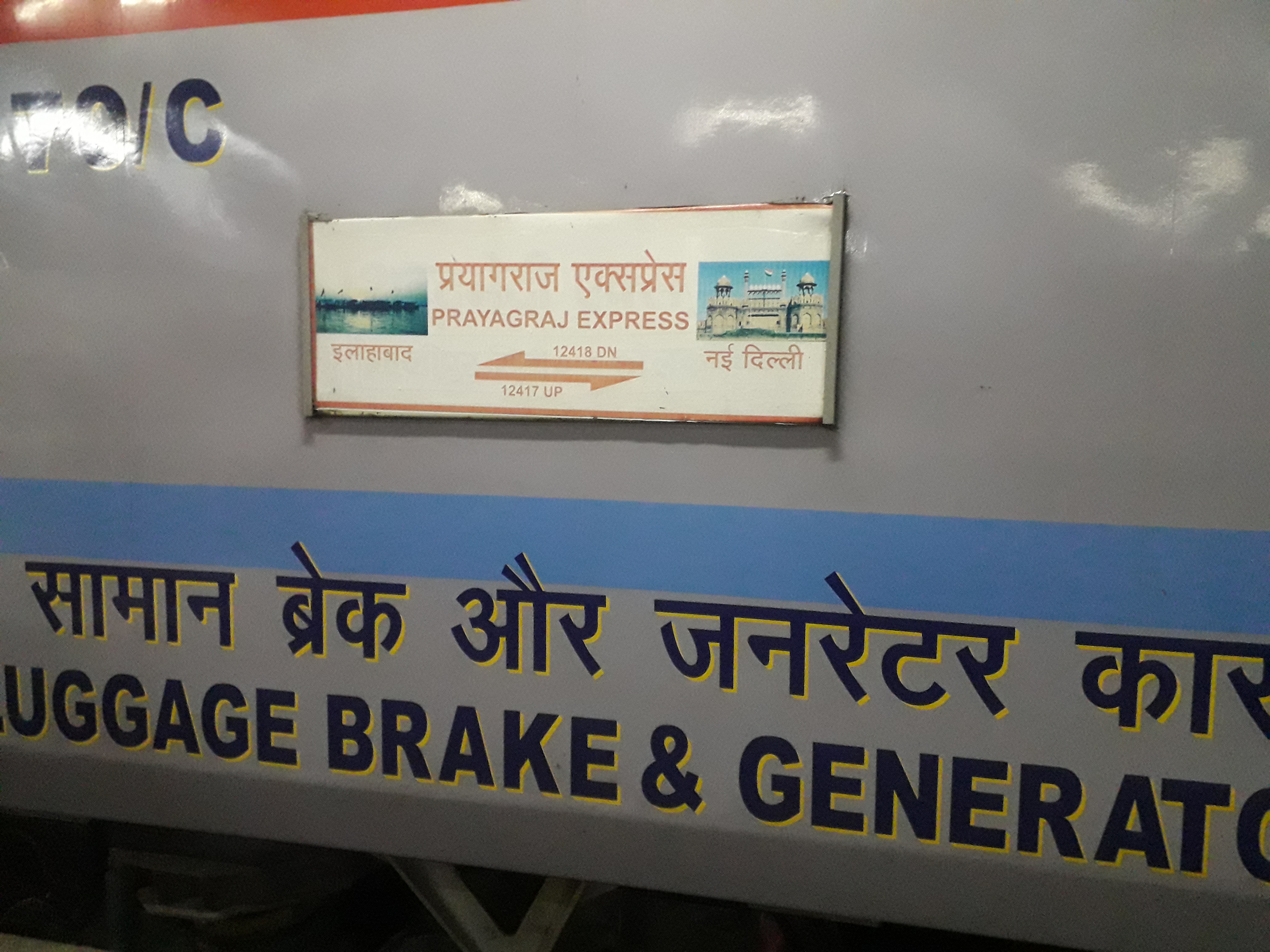

Overview
- Service type: Superfast Express
- Locale: Uttar Pradesh & Delhi
- First service: 16 July 1984
- Current operator(s): North Central Railways

Route
- Termini: Prayagraj Junction (PRYJ); New Delhi (NDLS)
- Stops: 4
- Distance travelled: 635 km (395 mi)
- Average journey time: 8 hrs 50 mnts
- Service frequency: Daily
- Train number(s): 12417 / 12418

On-board services
- Class(es): AC first class, AC 2-tier, AC 3-tier, Sleeper, General Unreserved
- Seating arrangements: Yes
- Sleeping arrangements: Yes
- Auto-rack arrangements: No
- Catering facilities: E-catering
- Observation facilities: Large windows

Technical
- Rolling stock: LHB coach
- Track gauge: 1,676 mm (5 ft 6 in)
- Operating speed: 130 km/h (Avg. Speed = 72 km/h)

The 12417 / 12418 Prayagraj Delhi S. F Express is a daily Overnight Superfast Express VVIP train which runs between the cities of Prayagraj (earlier known as Allahabad) and New Delhi, India.

Prayagraj Express along with Shram Shakti Express, Shiv Ganga Express, Lucknow Mail and Shaan-e-Bhopal Express enjoys highest priority all over the route.

== Rakes ==
This train used ICF coach till December 2016. On 18 December 2016, replacing the old ICF coach, this train got new German LHB rakes with a total of 24 coaches. Modern LHB coach with a MPS (Maximum Permissible Speed) of 160 km/h are more comfortable. The new coaches, based on a German technology Linke Hoffman Busch (LHB), are made of stainless steel which do not turn turtle during accidents. The light-weight coaches will also improve the train's speed. Bigger windows, biotoilets, lamps at all AC seats and sound insulation are the other features.

== Schedule ==
12417 PRAYAGRAJ EXPRESS departs Prayagraj Junction every day at 10.10 PM IST and arrives New Delhi at 07.00 AM IST

12418 PRAYAGRAJ EXPRESS departs New Delhi at 10.10 PM IST and arrives Prayagraj Junction at 07.00 AM IST

== Coaches ==
This train runs with two AC first-class coach, five AC 2 tier coaches, three AC 3 tier coaches, one AC 3 tier economy coach, nine sleeper coaches, two general coaches along with two EOG coaches. Thus, having a total of 24 LHB coach. It is the only train in India to be running with 24 LHB coach.

== Route and halts ==
It runs from Allahabad Junction via Fatehpur, Kanpur Central, Aligarh, Ghaziabad to New Delhi.

== Traction ==
It is hauled by a Kanpur-based WAP-7 locomotive on its entire journey.

== Accident ==
In dense fog, on 2 January 2010, the Gorakhdham Express and Prayagraj Express collided near the Panki railway station near Kanpur, about 60 miles (100 kilometers) southwest of Lucknow. Ten people died and about 54 were injured.

== See also ==
- New Delhi railway station
- Allahabad Junction (now officially Prayagraj Junction)
- Allahabad New Delhi Humsafar Express
- Purushottam Express
- Shiv Ganga Express
