= Shram Shakti Express =

Train in India

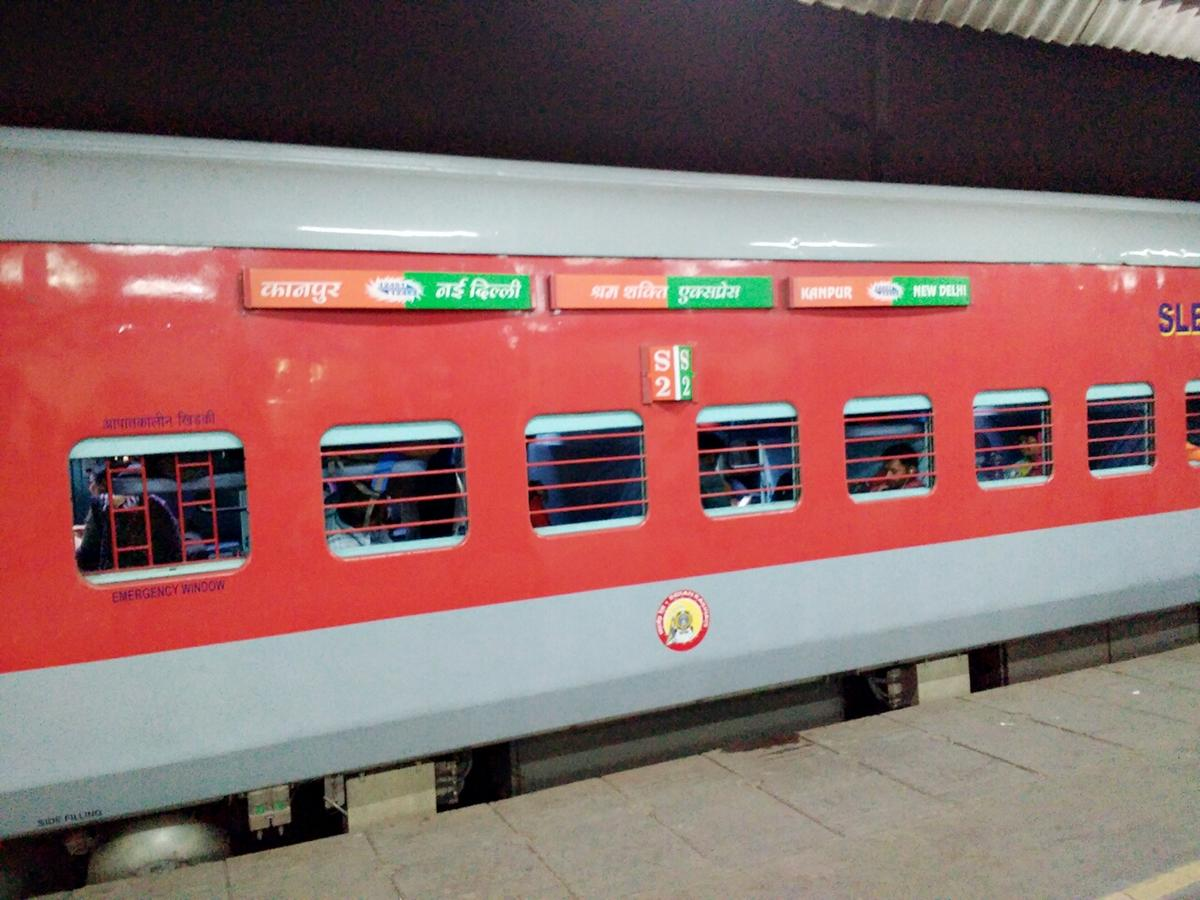

Overview
- Service type: Superfast Express
- Locale: Delhi & Uttar Pradesh
- First service: 1 September 2002; 23 years ago
- Current operator: North Central Railway

Route
- Termini: Kanpur Central (CNB); New Delhi (NDLS)
- Stops: 1
- Distance travelled: 440 km (273 mi)
- Average journey time: 6 hrs 12 mins
- Service frequency: Daily
- Train number: 12451 / 12452

On-board services
- Classes: AC First Class, AC 2 Tier, AC 3 Tier, AC 3 Tier Economy, Sleeper Class, General Unreserved
- Seating arrangements: Yes
- Sleeping arrangements: Yes
- Catering facilities: E-catering only
- Observation facilities: Large windows
- Baggage facilities: Available
- Other facilities: Below the seats

Technical
- Rolling stock: LHB coach
- Track gauge: 1,676 mm (5 ft 6 in)
- Operating speed: 75 km/h (47 mph) average including halts.
Route map
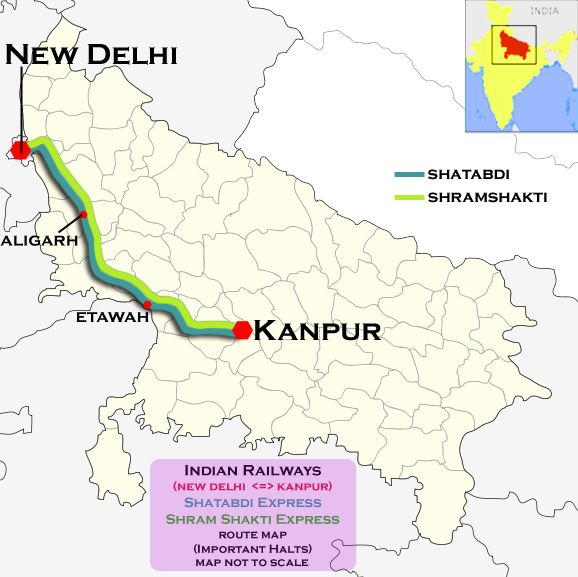

The 12451 / 12452 Shram Shakti Express is an Indian Railways Superfast Express train which daily runs non-stop overnight between the cities of Kanpur and New Delhi. It covers the 440 km of distance in 6 hours and has Top Priority advantage over other trains.

Shram Shakti Express along with Lucknow Mail, Prayagraj Express, Shiv Ganga Express and Shaan-e-Bhopal Express enjoys highest priority all over the route.

Modern LHB coach with a MPS of 160 kmph are more comfortable. The new coaches, based on a German technology Linke Hoffman Busch, are made of stainless steel which do not turn turtle during accidents; the light-weight coaches will improve the train's speed. Bigger windows, lamps at all AC seats and sound insulation are the other facilities of this train. Shram Shakti Express runs with 1 AC 1 tier coach, 1 AC 2 tier coach,5 AC 3E coaches,4 AC 3 tier coaches, 5 Sleeper coaches, 4 General coaches along with 1 EOG coach and 1 SLR coach. Thus, having a total of 22 LHB coach; the normal locomotive of Shram Shakti is a WAP-7 locomotive of Kanpur shed. Loco in-charge for this train is WAP-7 Kanpur Shed.Earlier was hauled by a WAP-4 Kanpur Shed or before that some cases WAP-4 Ghaziabad Shed. Earlier It was used to run non stop over night between New Delhi and Kanpur Central, but it had given a halt at Panki Dham (Earlier "Panki") in Kanpur to cater city people better from 07 July 2017. It was given a Panki Halt from 08 March 2016 till 04 September 2016 as an experimental halt but due to less patronage of halts and bookings and number of boarding-deboarding of passengers it was withdrawn then. It is non-stop overnight train. Punctual and clean also; this along with Kanpur Shatabdi are two trains from/to NDLS-CNB.

== Background ==
The train has two dedicated LHB rakes. Shram Shakti Express and Kanpur–New Delhi Shatabdi Express are two dedicated intercity trains between New Delhi (NDLS) and Kanpur Central (CNB). Another train is Kanpur Central–Anand Vihar Terminal Express a weekly train between Anand Vihar Terminal (ANVT), New Delhi to Kanpur Central.

== Development ==
Initially it got new German LHB Rakes on 18 March 2018. But the train ran with these rakes on alternative days. But On 29 July 2018, replacing the old ICF coaches completely, Shram Shakti Express got new German LHB rakes. Modern LHB coach are more comfortable and at the same time faster than the conventional ICF coaches.

== Coaches ==
Shram Shakti Express runs with,

- AC First class coach,
- 5 AC 3E coaches
- AC 2 tier coach,
- 4 AC 3 tier coaches,
- 5 Sleeper coaches,
- 4 Unreserved coaches,
- 1 EOG coach
- 1 SLR coach

Thus, having a total of 22 LHB coach.

== Traction ==
It is regularly hauled by a Kanpur Loco Shed-based WAP-7 or WAP-4 electric locomotive from end to end.

== Coach composition ==
Coach composition are as follows(for 12452)-

Loco	1	2	3	4	5	6	7	8	9	10	11	12	13	14	15	16	17	18	19	20	21	22
	EOG	S5	S4	S3	S2	S1	M5	M4	M3	M2	M1	B4	B3	B2	B1	A1	H1	GS	GS	GS	GS	SLR

And for 12451 it is the reverse.
