= Panki railway station =

Railway station in Uttar Pradesh, India

Panki Dham

General information
- Location: Station Road, Panki, Kanpur, Uttar Pradesh; India
- Coordinates: 26.4596°N 80.2383°E
- Elevation: 130 metres (430 ft)
- System: Indian Railways station
- Owner: Indian Railways
- Line: Kanpur–Delhi line
- Platforms: 3
- Tracks: 5
- Connections: Auto stand

Construction
- Platform levels: 2
- Parking: Yes
- Cycle facilities: Yes

Other information
- Status: Active
- Station code: PNKD
- Fare zone: North Central Railway

History
- Opened: 1981

Passengers
- 50,000
Location
- Location within Uttar Pradesh Location within India

Panki Dham railway station is a large railway station in Kanpur district, Uttar Pradesh, India. Panki Dham is the fourth-largest railway station in Kanpur city, for which is serves. Its code is PNKD. The station consists of 3 platforms and has many Express/Mail trains stoppage. Shram Shakti Express which travels between Kanpur Central and New Delhi only stops at Panki Dham between Kanpur and Delhi.

== Overview ==
Panki is an important industrial suburb in Kanpur city. Duncan's Fertilizer Unit (now owned by Jaypee Group) situated here is one of the largest fertilizer-manufacturing plants in India. Panki also has Panki Hanuman Temple which is visited by thousands of people every year from all over North India. Panki Station being on Howrah–Delhi main line serves people from Kalianpur, Panki, Armapur Estate, Kakadeo, Vijay Nagar and Fazalganj and if station have a direct entrance through Kalpi Road then it may also cover area like Bhaunti, Barra Dabauli i.e. almost 40% of Kanpur city. There should be a City bus stop in new entrance too.

== Gallery ==
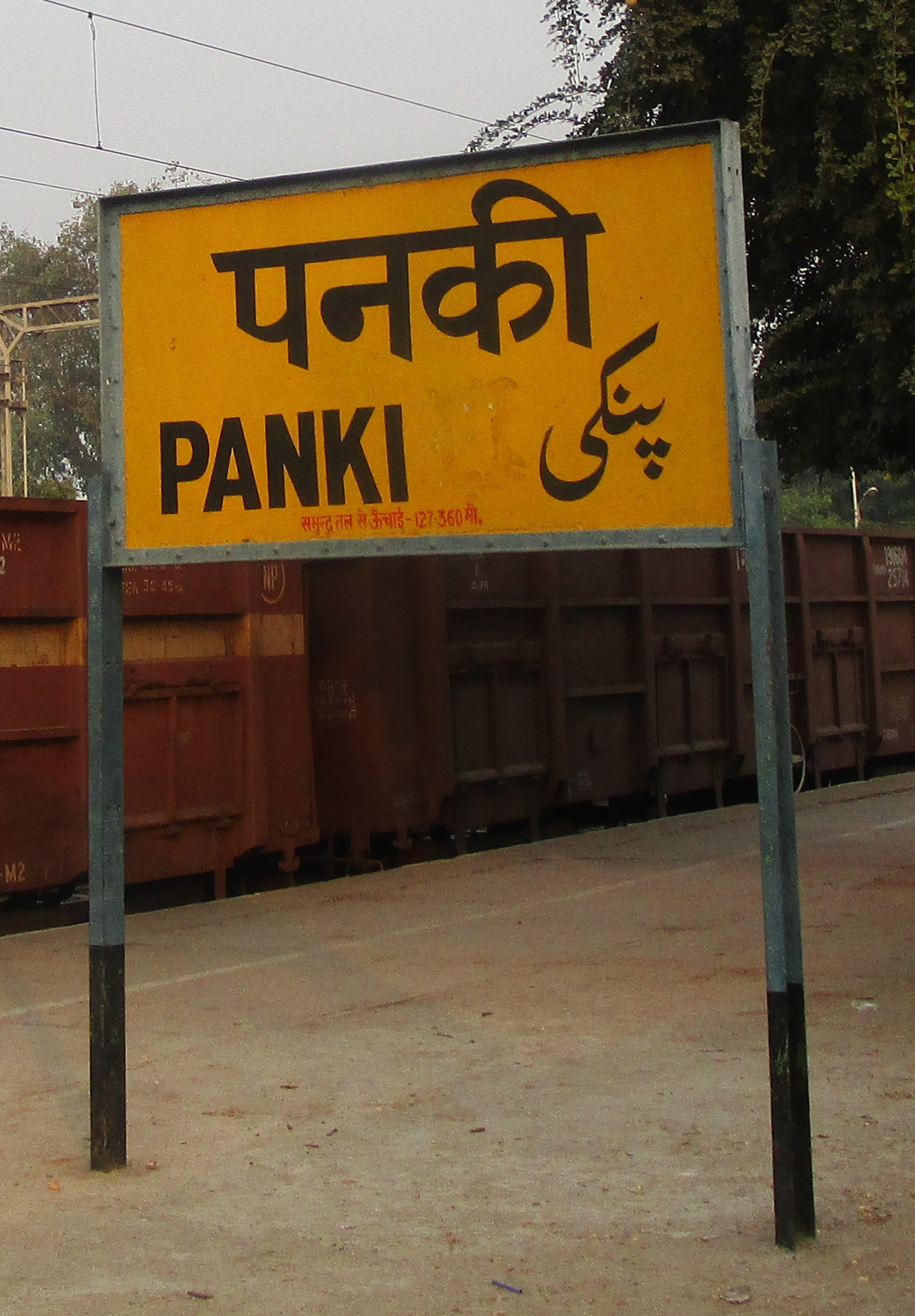
Panki railway station platform board

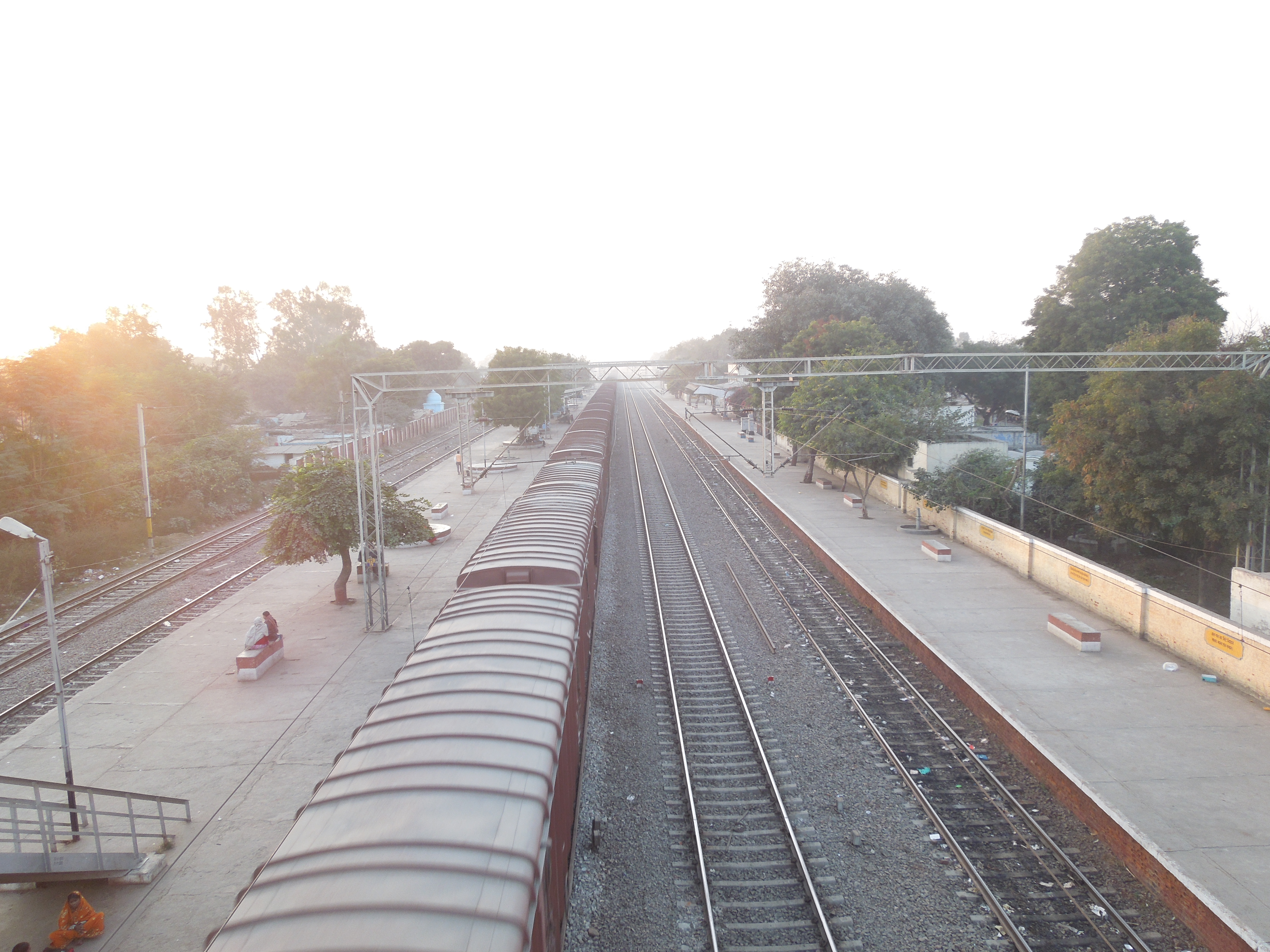
Inside platform view
