= Shaan-e-Bhopal Express =

Train in India

Shaan-e-Bhopal Superfast Express
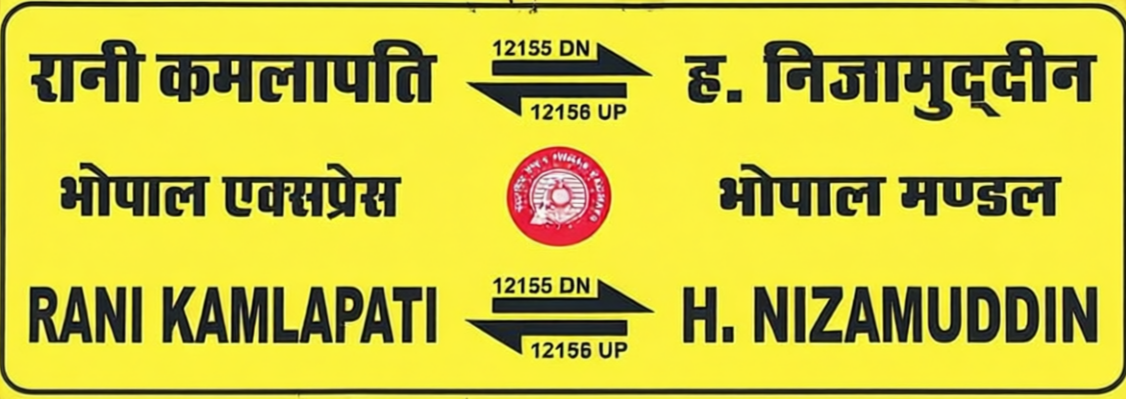

Overview
- Service type: Superfast Express
- Status: Running
- First service: May 23, 1999; 26 years ago
- Current operator: West Central Railway

Route
- Termini: Rani Kamalapati (RKMP); Hazrat Nizamuddin (NZM)
- Stops: 8
- Distance travelled: 702 km (436 mi)
- Average journey time: 10 hrs 55 mins
- Train number: 12155 / 12156

On-board services
- Classes: AC first, AC 2 Tier, AC 3 Tier, Sleeper class, General Unreserved
- Seating arrangements: Yes
- Sleeping arrangements: Yes
- Catering facilities: Available
- Observation facilities: Large windows
- Baggage facilities: Available
- Other facilities: Below the seats

Technical
- Rolling stock: LHB coach
- Track gauge: Broad Gauge
- Operating speed: 74 km/h (46 mph) average including halts.

The 12155 / 12156 Hazrat Nizamuddin–Rani Kamalapati Express (also Shaan-e-Bhopal) is a Daily Superfast Express train service, connecting Bhopal, the capital of Madhya Pradesh, India and New Delhi. It has the distinction of being the fastest 'non-Shatabdi', 'non-Rajdhani' and 'non-Sampark Kranti' train in India. The Shaan–E–Bhopal Express is the prestigious, one of the "first" ISO 9002 certified train of India, having high security features and high priority on the Indian Railways. The train is known for its cleanliness and maintenance also defining mindset of Bhopal which itself is cleanest state capital in India.

Bhopal Express along with Shram Shakti Express, Prayagraj Express, Shiv Ganga Express and Lucknow Mail enjoys highest priority all over the route.

It covers the distance of 702 kilometres between Rani Kamalapati railway station and Hazrat Nizamuddin railway station in Delhi in nine hours and twenty minutes (9 hours 20 minutes) and in return journey covers the same distance in 9 hours 40 minutes (9 hours 40 mins). Due to its convenient timings, it is a highly preferred train for passengers commuting to and from Bhopal and Nizamuddin (Delhi).

== Journey ==
Train no 12155 (Down) departs Rani Kamalapati, Bhopal and reaches Hazrat Nizamuddin, New Delhi the following morning.

The return journey train 12156 (Up) departs Hazrat Nizamuddin, New Delhi and reaches Rani Kamalapati, Bhopal the following morning. The train travels 702 km from Hazrat Nizamuddin, New Delhi to Rani Kamalapati, Bhopal

== Traction ==
As the route is fully electrified, it is hauled by a Tughlakabad-based WAP-7 locomotive end to end.

== Features ==
The train is hauled by a Tuglakabad WAP-7 locomotive. Bhopal Express is India's first ISO 9000-2001 certified train.

Its AC First Class, AC 2-tier, AC 3-tier coach as well as the Sleeper coaches were GPS enabled and provide information such as current train speed, distance to final destination, distance to next stop, stoppage station name and timing performance on an LCD. The train also had special facility of mini pantry and library erstwhile for the people and was beautifully decorated with photos of heritage sites and also had coach fresheners.But now after LHBfication all these things are absent.The train is very well known for its punctuality, speed and maintenance.

== Coach composition ==
Loco HCP SLR GS GS S6 S5 S4 S3 S2 S1 M1 B6 B5 B4 B3 B2 B1 A2 A1 H1 GS GS EOG

The rake of train is maintained at the yard of Rani Kamalapati (RKMP) railway station
