= Lucknow–New Delhi AC Duronto Express =

Lucknow New Delhi AC Duronto Express
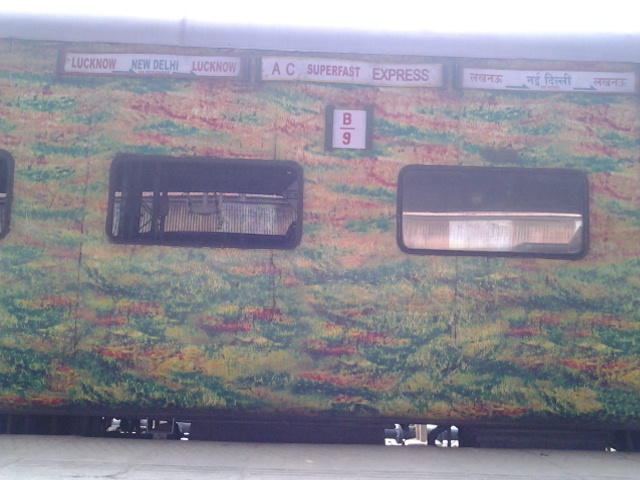

Overview
- Service type: Superfast Express, Duronto Express
- First service: 8 February 2010
- Last service: 14 June 2014
- Current operator: Northern Railways

Route
- Termini: Lucknow Charbagh; New Delhi
- Stops: 2
- Distance travelled: 493 km (306 mi)
- Average journey time: 08 hours 00 minutes as 12271 Lucknow New Delhi Duronto Express, 07 hours 40 minutes as 12272 New Delhi Lucknow Duronto Express.
- Service frequency: 3 days a week. 12271 Lucknow New Delhi Duronto Express – Monday, Thursday and Saturday. 12272 New Delhi Lucknow Duronto Express – Tuesday, Friday and Sunday.
- Train number: 12271 / 12272

On-board services
- Classes: AC 1st Class, AC 2 tier, AC 3 tier, AC 3 tier Economy
- Seating arrangements: No
- Sleeping arrangements: Yes
- Catering facilities: No Pantry car coach attached
- Observation facilities: Replaced by 12429/30 Lucknow Rajdhani Express

Technical
- Rolling stock: Standard Indian Railways Duronto coaches
- Track gauge: 1,676 mm (5 ft 6 in)
- Operating speed: 140 km/h (87 mph) maximum,62.94 km/h (39 mph), including halts

The 12271 / 72 Lucknow New Delhi Duronto Express was a Superfast Express train of the Duronto Express category belonging to Indian Railways - Northern Railway zone that runs between Lucknow NR and New Delhi in India. It was replaced by Lucknow Rajdhani Express, which was then replaced by Lucknow-New Delhi AC Superfast Express for everyday run.

It operates as train number 12271 from Lucknow NR to New Delhi and as train number 12272 in the reverse direction serving the states of Uttar Pradesh & Delhi.

== Coaches ==
The 12271 / 72 Lucknow New Delhi Duronto Express presently has 1 AC First Class, 2 AC 2 tier, 4 AC 3 tier, 4 AC 3 tier Economy and 2 End on Generator Car. It does not carry a Pantry car coach.

As is customary with most train services in India, Coach Composition may be amended at the discretion of Indian Railways depending on demand.

== Service ==
The 12271 Lucknow New Delhi Duronto Express covers the distance of 493 kilometres in 08 hours 00 mins (61.63 km/h) and in 07 hours 40 mins as 12272 New Delhi Lucknow Duronto Express (64.30 km/h).

As the average speed of the train is above 55 km/h (34 mph), as per Indian Railways rules, its fare includes a Superfast Express surcharge.

== Routing & Technical Halts ==
The 12271 / 72 Lucknow New Delhi Duronto Express used to run from Lucknow NR to New Delhi with a 10-minute technical halt at Moradabad Jn.

== Traction ==
As the route was not fully electrified, it used to be powered by a Tuglakabad-based WDM 3A for its entire journey.

== Timings ==
This Duronto used to depart Lucknow NR daily at 23:30 hrs IST and reach New Delhi at 07:25 hrs IST the next day.
