= Lucknow Mail =

Daily Superfast train between New Delhi and Lucknow NR

Lucknow Mail लखनऊ मेल
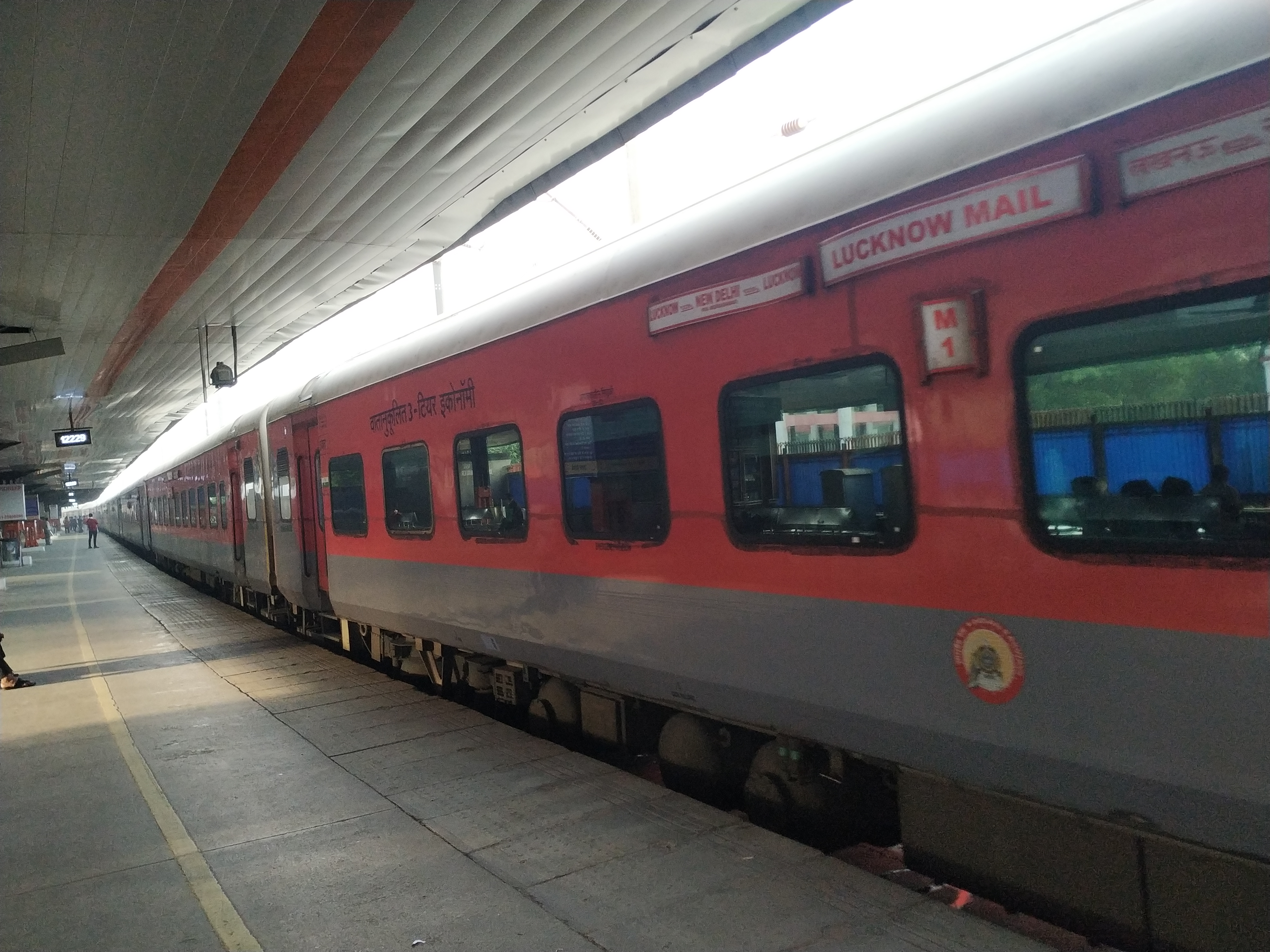
- 12229 Lucknow Mail on Platform 16 in New Delhi.

Overview
- Service type: Superfast Mail
- Status: Operating
- Locale: Uttar Pradesh & Delhi
- Current operator: Northern Railways

Route
- Termini: Lucknow Junction (LJN), Lucknow; New Delhi Railway Station (NDLS), New Delhi
- Stops: 7
- Distance travelled: 491 km
- Average journey time: NDLS TO LJN - 8 hrs 50 mins & LJN TO NDLS - 8 hrs 55 mins
- Train number: 12230 DN / 12229 UP

On-board services
- Classes: Sleeper, General, First AC, Second AC, Third AC
- Seating arrangements: Available
- Sleeping arrangements: Available

Technical
- Rolling stock: LHB coach
- Operating speed: 56 km/hour DN, 55 km/hour UP

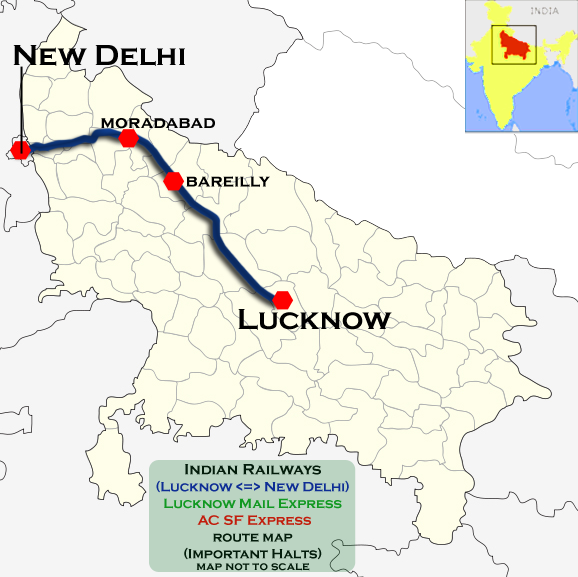
Lucknow Mail (Lucknow - New Delhi) route map

The 12229 / 12230 Lucknow S. F Mail is an Daily Mail train of Superfast Express category of Indian Railways running between Lucknow and New Delhi on a daily basis. It is numbered 12229 when starting from Lucknow and terminating at New Delhi, 12230 from New Delhi to Lucknow. It has received an ISO 9000 certification after Bhopal Express. Lucknow Mail is the first LHB train of Indian Railways running permanently with 24 coaches (22 coaches+2 EOG).

Lucknow Mail along with Shram Shakti Express, Prayagraj Express, Shiv Ganga Express and Shaan-e-Bhopal Express enjoys highest priority all over the route.

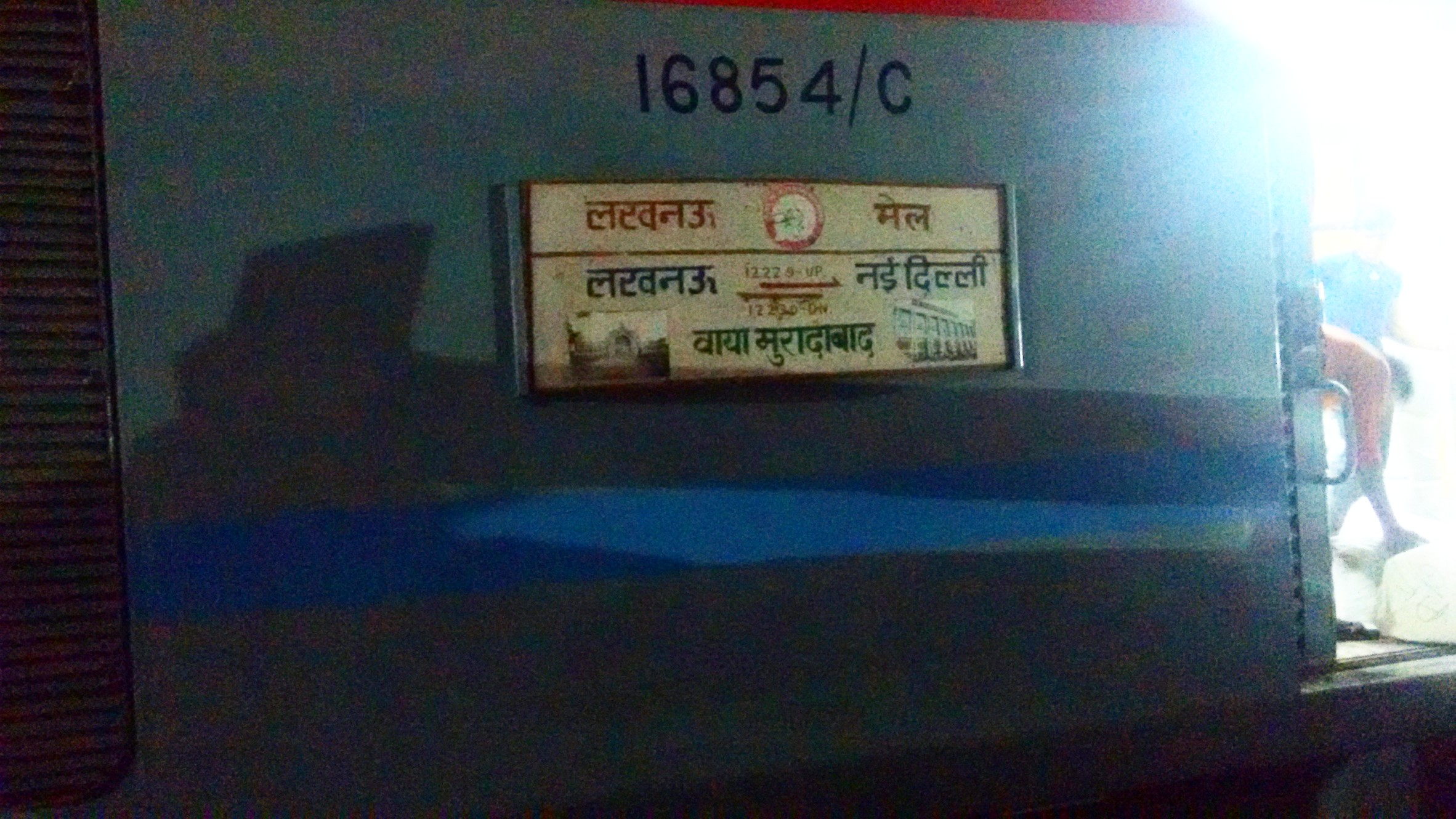
Lucknow Mail Destination Board

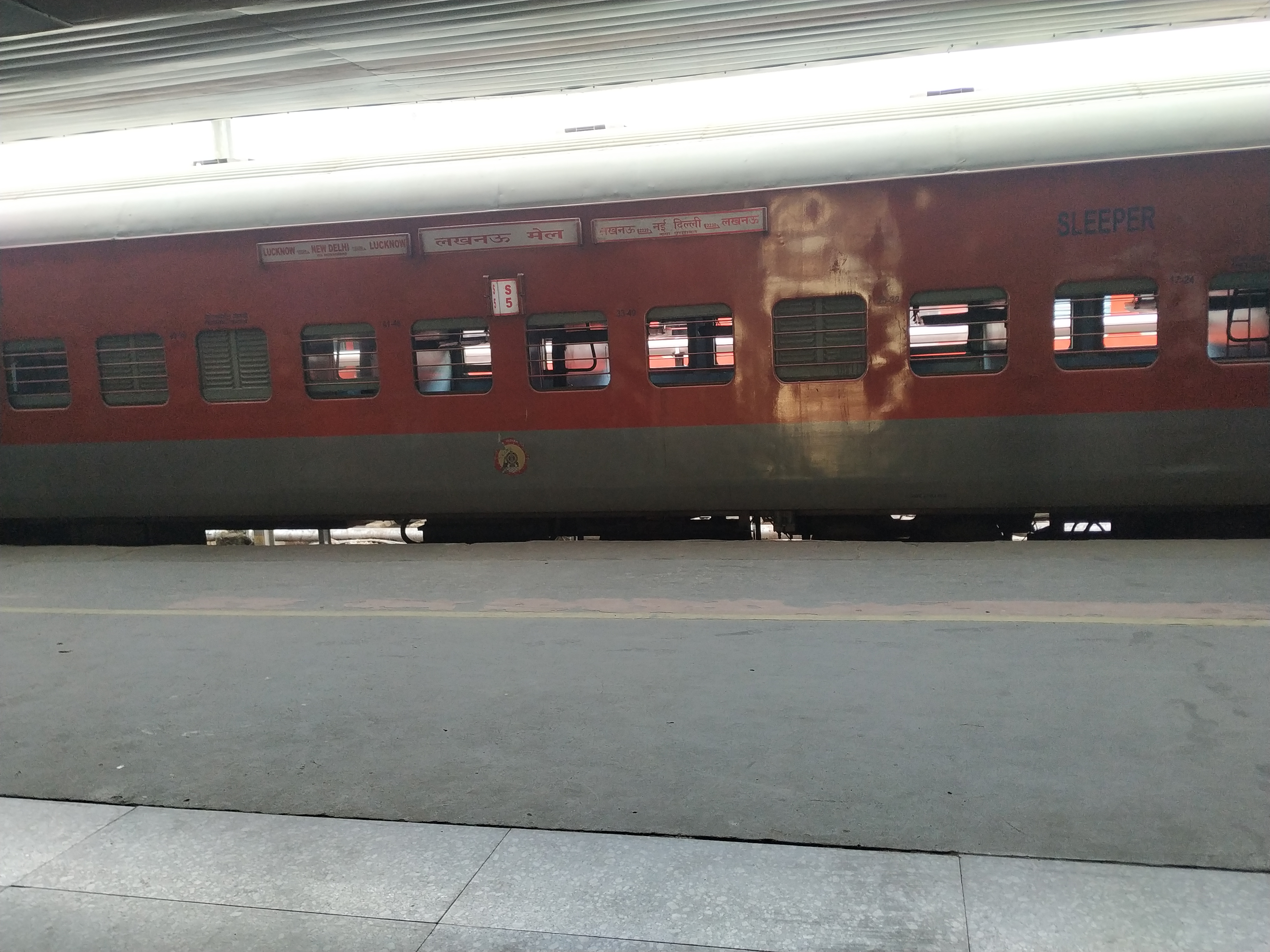
12229 Lucknow Mail on Platform 16 in New Delhi railway station

== From the past ==
Lucknow Mail originally had 29 Up and 30 Down numbers before rationalisation of number schemes. With the new rationalisation scheme the train was assigned with service numbers 4229 from Lucknow and 4230 from New Delhi. In the 2005–06 railway Budget, it was elevated to superfast category without withdrawing any previous intermediate stops. During the tenure of Mamata Banerjee as Railway Minister a new five digit numbering scheme was introduced and present numbers 12229 and 12230 were assigned to Lucknow Mail.

== Journey ==
The down train (#12230) departs New Delhi at 22:00 usually from Platform 16 and reaches Lucknow at 06:40 the following morning. The up train (#12229) departs Lucknow at 22:00 usually from Platform 1 and reaches New Delhi at 06:55 the following morning. The train boarding station was changed on 15/11/2018 from Lucknow Charbagh to Lucknow Junction Now on 15/08/2024 the boarding station is changed back to Lucknow Charbagh. The Time table is as follows:

12229 Lucknow Junction railway station to New Delhi

Station Code	Station Name
LJN	Lucknow Junction
HRI	Hardoi
SPN	Shahjahanpur
BE	Bareilly
RMU	Rampur Junction
MB	Moradabad
HPU	Hapur Junction
GZB	Ghaziabad Junction
NDLS	New Delhi

12230 New Delhi to Lucknow Junction railway station is the reverse.

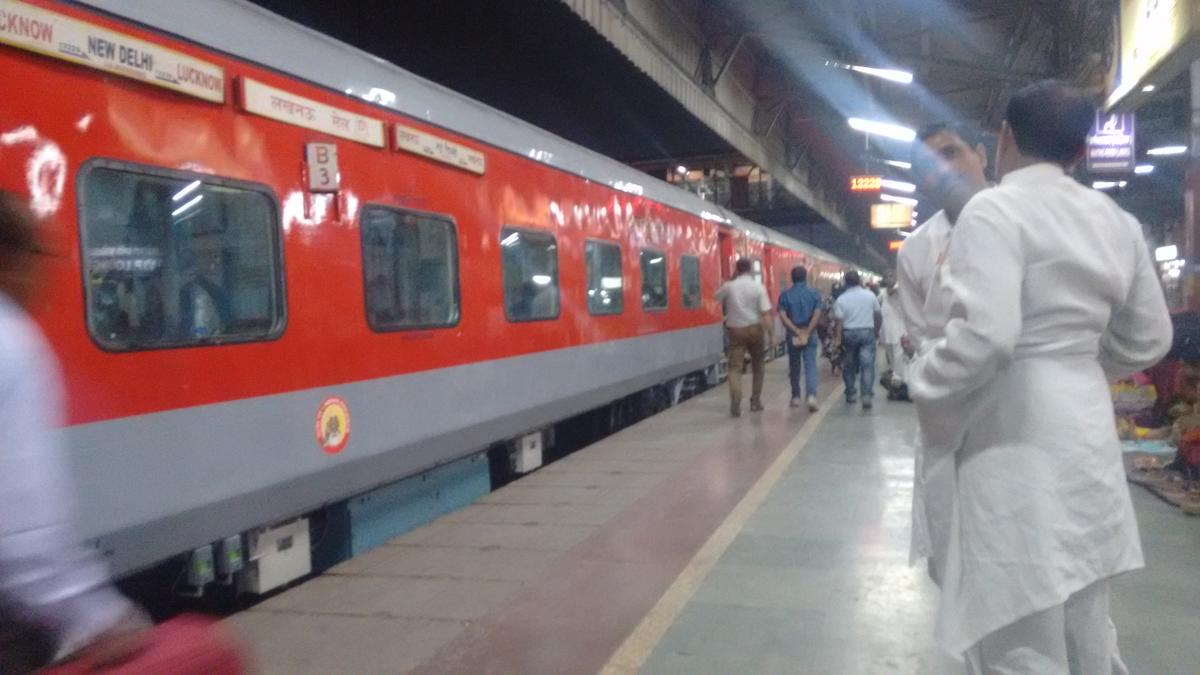
LHB AC Coach of Lucknow Mail

== Coaches ==
Coach Composition are as follows:

- 12229 LJN NDLS Loco-EOG-UR-UR-S1-S2-S3-S4-S5-S6-S7-M1-M2-B1-B2-B3-B4-H1-A1-A2-A3-A4-EOG
- 12230 NDLS LJN Loco-EOG-A4-A3-A2-A1-H1-B4-B3-B2-B1-M2-M1-S7-S6-S5-S4-S3-S2-S1-UR-UR-EOG

Loco in-charge for this train is WAP-7, WAP 5 from Ghaziabad, Uttar Pradesh (GZB) shed.

== See also ==
- New Delhi railway station
- Lucknow Charbagh railway station
