= Electric Loco Shed, Kanpur =

Loco shed in Uttar Pradesh, India

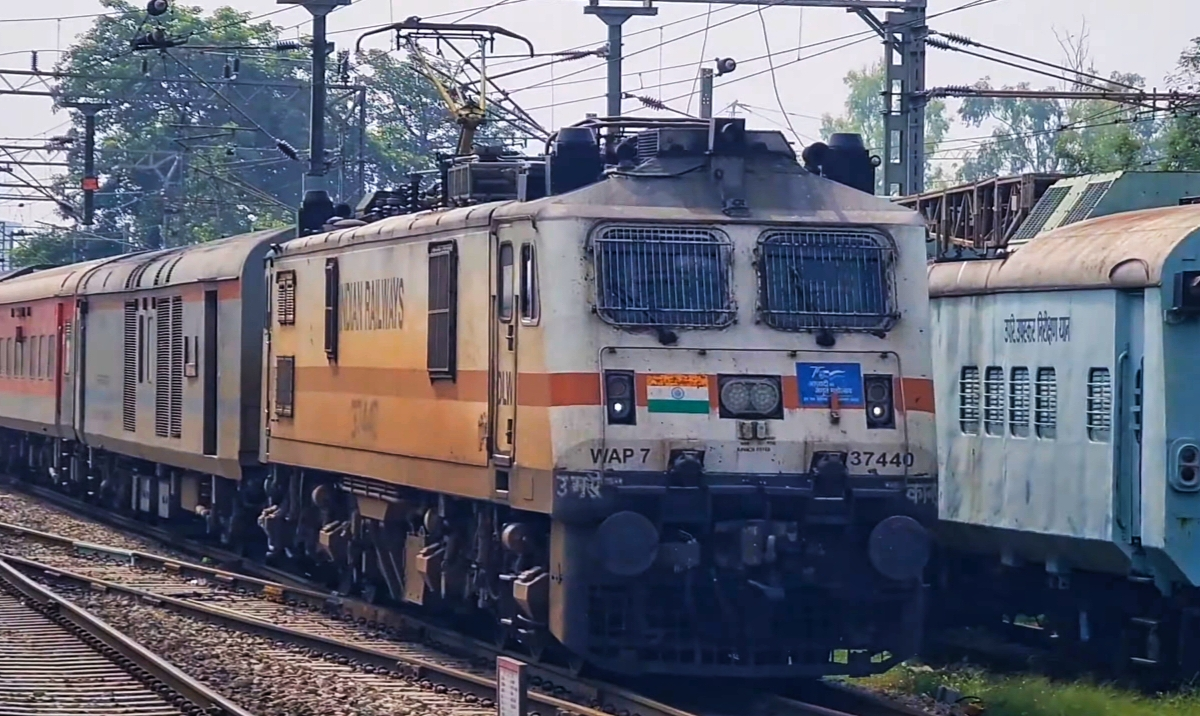
- CNB based WAP-7 at Jalandhar Cantt.

- Location within Uttar Pradesh

Location
- Location: Kanpur, Uttar Pradesh
- Coordinates: 26.455402°N 80.328925°E

Characteristics
- Owner: Indian Railways
- Operator: North Central Railways
- Depot code: CNB
- Type: Engine shed
- Roads: 6
- Rolling stock: WAP-7; WAG-9

History
- Opened: 1965; 61 years ago
- Former rolling stock: WAP-4; WAG-7; WAM-4

Electric Loco Shed, Kanpur is a motive power depot performing locomotive maintenance and repair facility for electric locomotives of the Indian Railways, located at Kanpur of the North Central Railway zone in Uttar Pradesh, India.

== Operation ==
Being one of the electric engine sheds in North Central Railway, various major and minor maintenance schedules of electric locomotives are carried out here. It has the sanctioned capacity of 150 engine units. Beyond the operating capacity, this shed houses a total of 321 engine units, WAP-7, 93 and 228 WAG-9. Like all locomotive sheds, CNB does regular maintenance, overhaul and repair including painting and washing of locomotives. CNB locomotives used to be predominantly the regular links for trains traveling to north and east as well.

Environment & Sustainability:- Solar Daylight Tech: Solar Day Pipe Lights (SDPL) illuminate approximately 6,870 m² of the shed, cutting artificial lighting needs during the day, slashing CO₂ emissions, and saving energy with near-zero maintenance.

Clean Energy Recognition:- With 1,200 kW of solar installations at the loco shed and related facilities, the initiative saved significant electricity cost and earned the shed a “Zero Plus” certificate from the Bureau of Energy Efficiency in early 2025.

Modern Safety Features:- The shed recently rolled out a WAG‑9 electric locomotive equipped with advanced safety systems—Kavach anti-collision technology, LIDAR-based obstacle detection, and an automatic fire suppression system—signalling a leap in operational safety.

Accolades:_ In a National -level Loco Cab Design competition, Kanpur’s shed secured the second prize, recognizing its efforts in enhancing driver convenience and maintenance innovations.

== Locomotive ==
Serial No.	Locomotive Class	Horsepower	Quantity
1.	WAP-7	6350	105
2.	WAG-9	6120	228
Total locomotives active as of July 2026			333
