= Ketki Devi Singh =

Indian politician

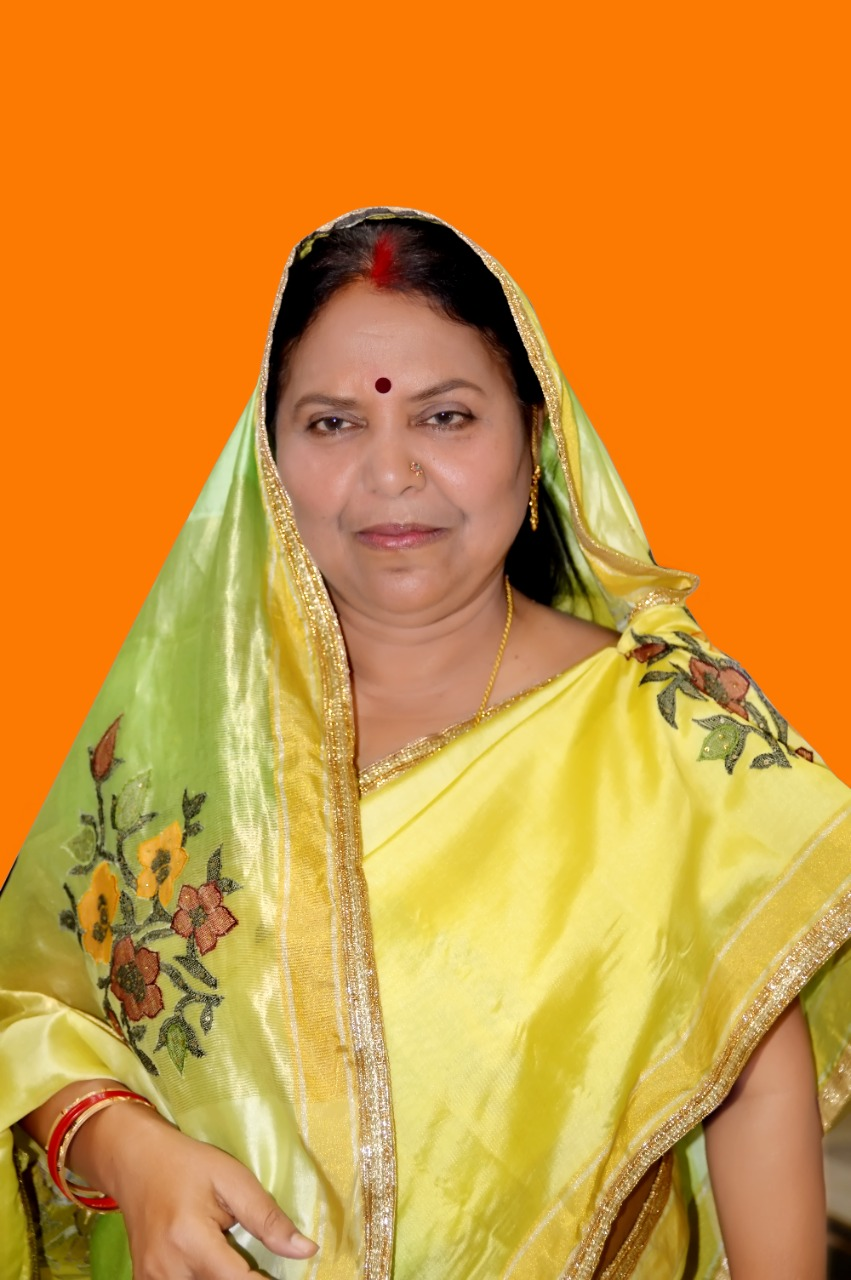

Member of Parliament, Lok Sabha
- In office 1996–1998
- Preceded by: Brij Bhushan Sharan Singh
- Succeeded by: Kirti Vardhan Singh
- Constituency: Gonda

President, Gonda District Panchayat
- In office 2018–2021
- Preceded by: Shradha Singh
- Succeeded by: Ghanshyam Mishra

Member, Gonda District Panchayat
- In office 2015–2021
- In office 1995–1996
- Constituency: Nawabganj, Gonda

Personal details
- Born: 3 July 1969 (age 57) Maharajganj, Uttar Pradesh
- Party: Bhartiya Janta Party
- Spouse: Brij Bhushan Sharan Singh (m. 1981)
- Children: 4, including Prateek Bhushan Singh and Karan Bhushan Singh
- Profession: Politician

Ketki Devi Singh (born 3 July 1958) is a former Member of Parliament and former District Panchayat President elected from the Gonda district constituency in the Indian state of Uttar Pradesh being a Bhartiya Janta Party candidate.

== Early life ==
Ketki was born on 3 July 1958 in Brijmanganj in Maharajganj district in (Uttar Pradesh). She married Brij Bhushan Sharan Singh on 11 May 1980. She has three sons and a daughter including one eldest son Shakti Singh deceased, second son Prateek Bhushan Singh currently serving as a B.J.P. M.L.A. for 2 terms from the Gonda Assembly Constituency, youngest son Karan Bhushan Singh is currently serving as a B.J.P. M.P. from Kaiserganj Lok Sabha constituency and is also serving as the Current President of Uttar Pradesh State Wrestling Association and is the former Vice President of Wrestling Federation Of India (W.F.I.). He is still serving as a Senior Executive Member of W.F.I. Ketki's spouse Brij Bhushan Sharan Singh has served as a 6 Term M.P. from the Lok Sabha constituencies, Kaiserganj Loksabha Constituency, Gonda Lok Sabha Constituency and the then Balrampur Lok Sabha constituency. Brij Bhushan has also served as the President of Wrestling Federation Of India (2011–24).
