= Gonda Lok Sabha constituency =

Constituency of the Indian parliament in Uttar Pradesh

Coordinates: 27.14°N 81.96°E

Gonda UP-59
- Lok Sabha constituency
- Interactive Map Outlining Gonda Lok Sabha constituency

Constituency details
- Country: India
- Region: North India
- State: Uttar Pradesh
- Assembly constituencies: Utraula; Mehnaun; Gonda; Mankapur; Gaura
- Established: 1957
- Reservation: None

Member of Parliament
- 18th Lok Sabha
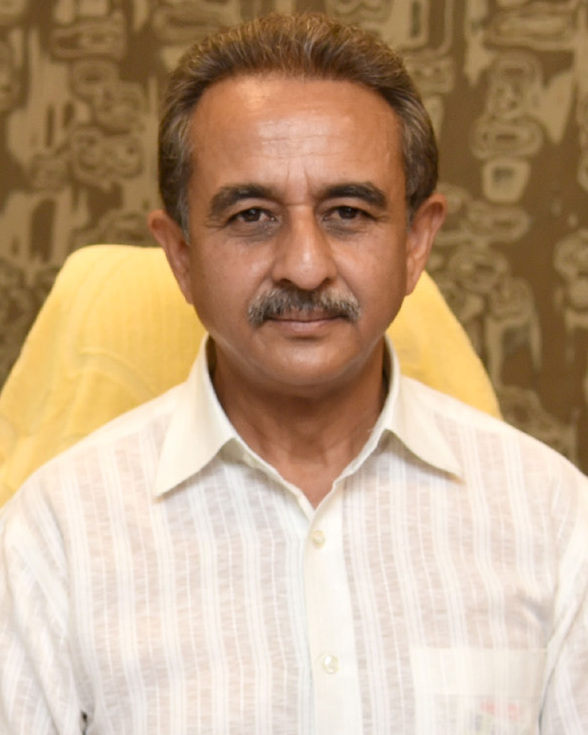
- Incumbent Kirti Vardhan Singh
- Party: Bharatiya Janata Party
- Elected year: 2024

Gonda Lok Sabha constituency is one of the 80 Lok Sabha (parliamentary) constituencies in Uttar Pradesh state in northern India.

== Assembly segments ==
No	Name	District	Member	Party	2024 Lead
293	Utraula	Balrampur	Ram Pratap Verma	BJP	SP
295	Mehnaun	Gonda	Vinay Dwivedi	BJP	BJP
296	Gonda	Gonda	Prateek Bhushan Singh	BJP	BJP
300	Mankapur (SC)	Gonda	Ramapati Shastri	BJP	BJP
301	Gaura	Gonda	Prabhat Kumar Verma	BJP	SP

== Members of Parliament ==
Year	Name	Party
1957	Dinesh Pratap Singh	Indian National Congress
1962	Ram Ratan Gupta	Indian National Congress
1964^	Narayan Dandekar	Swatantra Party
1967	Sucheta Kripalani	Indian National Congress
1971	Anand Singh	Indian National Congress (O)
1977	Satya Deo Singh	Bharatiya Lok Dal
1980	Anand Singh	Indian National Congress (I)
1984	Anand Singh	Indian National Congress
1989	Anand Singh	Indian National Congress
1991	Brij Bhushan Sharan Singh	Bharatiya Janata Party
1996	Ketki Devi Singh	Bharatiya Janata Party
1998	Kirti Vardhan Singh	Samajwadi Party
1999	Brij Bhushan Sharan Singh	Bharatiya Janata Party
2004	Kirti Vardhan Singh	Samajwadi Party
2009	Beni Prasad Verma	Indian National Congress
2014	Kirti Vardhan Singh	Bharatiya Janata Party
2019	Kirti Vardhan Singh	Bharatiya Janata Party
2024	Kirti Vardhan Singh	Bharatiya Janata Party

== Elections results ==
=== General election 2024 ===
2024 Indian general election: Gonda
Party	Candidate	Votes	%	±%
BJP	Kirti Vardhan Singh	474,258	49.77	▼5.24
SP	Shreya Verma	4,28,034	44.92	▲7.92
BSP	Saurabh Mishra	29,429	3.09	▲3.09
NOTA	None of the above	9,055	0.95	▲0.04
Majority		46,224	4.85	▼13.15
Turnout		9,52,884	51.70	▼0.50
BJP hold		Swing		

=== General election 2019 ===
2019 Indian general elections: Gonda
Party	Candidate	Votes	%	±%
BJP	Kirti Vardhan Singh	508,190	55.01	+14.20
SP	Vinod Kumar Singh (Pandit Singh)	3,41,830	37.00	+13.85
INC	Krishna Patel	25,686	2.78	−8.92
PSP(L)	Qutabuddin Khan	6,212	0.67	0.67
SBSP	Radhey Shyam	3,856	0.47	0.47
NOTA	None of the Above	8,418	0.91	
Majority		1,66,360	18.00	
Turnout		9,24,123	52.20	−0.45
BJP hold		Swing		

=== General election 2014 ===
2014 Indian general elections: Gonda
Party	Candidate	Votes	%	±%
BJP	Kirti Vardhan Singh	359,643	41.16	
SP	Nandita Shukla	1,99,227	22.80	
BSP	Akbar Ahmad Dumpy	1,16,178	13.30	
INC	Beni Prasad Verma	1,02,254	11.70	
PECP	Masood Alam Khan	42,744	4.89	
CPI	Om Prakash	18,450	2.11	
NOTA	None of the Above	7,988	0.91	
Majority		1,60,416	18.36	
Turnout		8,73,934	51.08	
BJP gain from INC		Swing		

=== General election 2009 ===
2009 Indian general elections: Gonda
Party	Candidate	Votes	%	±%
INC	Beni Prasad Verma	155,675	25.72	
BSP	Kirti Vardhan Singh	1,32,000	21.80	
BJP	Ram Pratap Singh	90,498	14.95	
SP	Vinod Kumar Singh	88,558	14.63	
PECP	Ashiq Ali	73,235	12.10	
Independent	Om Prakash	7,297	1.2	
Majority		23,675	3.92	
Turnout		6,05,243	45.18	
INC gain from SP		Swing		

=== General election 2004 ===
2004 Indian general elections: Gonda
Party	Candidate	Votes	%	±%
SP	Kirti Vardhan Singh	251,947	41.53	
BJP	Ghanshyam Shukla	2,14,949	35.43	
BSP	Fazlul Bari Alias Banne Bhai	69,543	11.46	
INC	Vinay Kumar Pandey	28,804	4.74	
CPI	Suresh Chandra Tripathi Advocate	6,002	0.98	
Majority		36,998	6.09	
Turnout		6,06,654	34.77	
SP gain from BJP		Swing		

=== General election 1999 ===
1999 Indian general elections: Gonda
Party	Candidate	Votes	%	±%
BJP	Brij Bhushan Sharan Singh	243,162	42.14	
SP	Kirti Vardhan Singh	1,83,965	31.88	
INC	Deep Narain Pandey	64,817	11.23	
BSP	Ayodhya Naresh Pandey	32,584	5.65	
CPI	Shastri Prasad Tripathi	8,571	1.49	
Majority		59,917	10.38	
Turnout		5,77,026	50.07	
BJP gain from SP		Swing		

=== General election 1998 ===
1998 Indian general elections: Gonda
Party	Candidate	Votes	%	±%
SP	Kirti Vardhan Singh	278,449	45.56	
BJP	Brij Bhushan Sharan Singh	2,52,894	41.38	
BSP	Sant Ram Tiwari	48,816	7.99	
Independent	Jagdev	8,420	1.38	
INC	Mohd Nadeem	5,094	0.83	
Majority		25,555	4.18	
Turnout		6,11,159	53.45	
SP gain from BJP		Swing		

=== General election 1996 ===
1996 Indian general elections: Gonda
Party	Candidate	Votes	%	±%
BJP	Ketki Devi Singh	245,605	47.09	
SP	Kunwar Anand Singh	1,78,456	34.08	
BSP	Fida Mohammad	27,963	5.45	
INC	Deep Narayan Van (Mahant)	14,439	2.82	
Independent	Brij Kishor	450	0.09	
Majority		67,149	13.09	
Turnout		5,12,792	45.22	
BJP hold		Swing		

=== General election 1991 ===
1991 Indian general elections: Gonda
Party	Candidate	Votes	%	±%
BJP	Brij Bhushan Sharan Singh	217,115	50.69	
INC	Kunwar Anand Singh	1,14,131	26.65	
JP	Syeed Abdul Rauf	39,628	9.25	
BSP	Mahesh Lal	10,749	2.51	
IPF	Akhilandra Pratap Singh	9,484	2.21	
Majority		1,02,984	24.04	
Turnout		4,28,321	47.63	
BJP gain from INC		Swing		

== See also ==
- Gonda district
- List of constituencies of the Lok Sabha
