= Shakuntala Nayar =

Indian politician (born 1926)

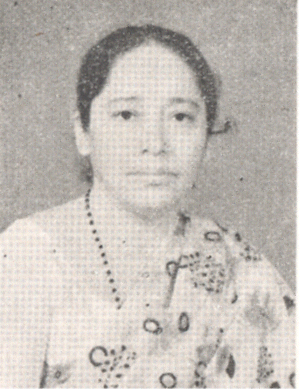

Member of Parliament, Lok Sabha
- In office 4 March 1967 – 18 January 1977
- Prime Minister: Indira Gandhi
- Preceded by: Basant Kunwari
- Succeeded by: Rudra Sen Chaudhary
- Constituency: Kaiserganj, Uttar Pradesh
- In office 17 April 1952 – 4 April 1957
- Prime Minister: Jawaharlal Nehru
- Preceded by: constituency established
- Constituency: Gonda District (West), Uttar Pradesh

Member of Uttar Pradesh Legislative Assembly
- In office 17 April 1952 – 4 April 1957
- Constituency: Nagar, Uttar Pradesh

Personal details
- Born: January 1926 Mohan Pass, Dehradun, United Provinces of Agra and Oudh, British India
- Party: Hindu Mahasabha; Bharatiya Jana Sangh
- Spouse: K. K. Nayar (m.1946; died 1977)
- Children: 1
- Parent: Dalip Singh Bisht
- Education: Wynberg Allen School

Shakuntala Nayar (born January 1926, date of death unknown) was an Indian politician from Uttar Pradesh who was a member of Lok Sabha.

== Personal life ==
She was born as daughter of Dalip Singh Bisht at Mohand Pass, Dehradun. She had her schooling from Wynberg Allen School. She was married to Indian Civil Service officer K. K. Nayar in April 1946. They have a child named Marthanda Vikraman Nayar

== Public life ==
She was elected to Lok Sabha from Kaiserganj (Lok Sabha constituency) in Uttar Pradesh as a candidate of Jana Sangha. She was a member of Uttar Pradesh Legislative Assembly from 1962 to 1967. She was elected to Lok Sabha thrice, in 1952 as member of Hindu Maha Sabha, and in 1967 and 1971 from Kaiserganj as member of Bharatiya Jana Sangh. Nayar is deceased.

== See also ==
- K. K. Nayar
