= Vinod Singh (Gonda politician) =

Indian politician (died 2021)

Vinod Kumar Singh
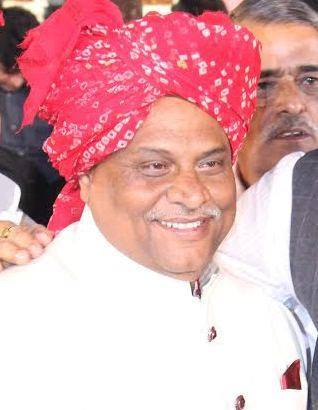

Cabinet Minister Government of Uttar Pradesh
- In office 2015–2017
- Chief Minister: Akhilesh Yadav
- Ministry & Department's: Agriculture
- Preceded by: Kunwar Anand Singh
- Succeeded by: Surya Pratap Shahi

Minister of State Government of Uttar Pradesh
- In office 2013–2015
- Chief Minister: Akhilesh Yadav
- Ministry & Department's: Secondary Education
- In office 2012–2012
- Chief Minister: Akhilesh Yadav
- Ministry & Department's: Revenue
- In office 2003–2007
- Chief Minister: Mulayam Singh Yadav
- Ministry & Department's: Medical Education

Member of Uttar Pradesh Legislative Assembly
- In office 2012–2017
- Preceded by: Mohammad Jalil Khan
- Succeeded by: Prateek Bhushan Singh
- In office 1996–2007
- Preceded by: Tulsi Das Raichandani
- Succeeded by: Mohammad Jalil Khan
- Constituency: Gonda

Personal details
- Born: 7 January 1962 Gonda, Uttar Pradesh, India
- Died: 7 May 2021 (aged 59) Lucknow, Uttar Pradesh, India
- Party: Samajwadi Party
- Spouse: Sona Singh
- As of 17 September 2019

Vinod Kumar Singh alias Pandit Singh (7 January 1962 – 7 May 2021) was an Indian politician from the state of Uttar Pradesh. A three-time legislator and a senior member of the Samajwadi Party, Pandit Singh represented Gonda assembly constituency in the 13th, 14th and 16th Uttar Pradesh Legislative Assembly which is the lower house of the bicameral legislature of Uttar Pradesh. He also served as a cabinet minister in the Govt. of Uttar Pradesh under the chief ministership of Akhilesh Yadav. He also contested the 2019 parliamentary elections from Gonda but lost to Kirti Vardhan Singh of BJP. He died on 7 May 2021 from COVID-19 related complications at the age of 59 years.

A number of politicians including Hriday Narayan Dikshit- the then Speaker of Uttar Pradesh Legislative Assembly and Akhilesh Yadav- national president of the Samajwadi Party have expressed grief at his demise.

== Political career ==
His political career was started in 1995. In the year of 1996 for the first time he was elected as an Member of the Legislative Assembly (India) of Gonda assembly constituency. In 2003 he was made the minister of state of Medical & Education in the cabinet of Mulayam Singh Yadav. In the year of 2012 he was again elected as MLA of Gonda seat and served as Minister of Revenue in the cabinet of Akhilesh Yadav. In October 2013 he resigned from minister post and later he became Minister of Secondary Education of UP. In 2014 he contested from Kaiserganj Lok Sabha constituency and was defeated by Brij Bhushan Sharan Singh and later he served as Minister of Agriculture.
