= Prateek Bhushan Singh =

Indian politician

Member of Legislative Assembly, Uttar Pradesh
- Incumbent
- Assumed office March 2017
- Preceded by: Pandit Singh
- Constituency: Gonda

Personal details
- Born: 9 May 1988 (age 38) Gonda, Uttar Pradesh, India
- Party: Bharatiya Janata Party
- Spouse: Rajshree Singh (m. 2011)
- Relations: Karan Bhushan Singh (Brother)
- Parents: Brij Bhushan Sharan Singh (father); Ketki Devi Singh (mother)
- Education: Dr. Ram Manohar Lohia Avadh University (L.L.B.); University of Melbourne (M.B.A.)
- Occupation: Politician

Prateek Bhushan Singh (born 9 May 1988) is an Indian politician. He is a 2nd Term Member of Uttar Pradesh Legislative Assembly, representing Gonda.

== Personal life ==
He is the elder brother of Karan Bhushan Singh B.J.P. MP from Kaiserganj constituency, he is the elder son of Brij Bhushan Sharan Singh, 6 Time former Lok Sabha MP from Kaiserganj constituency, Tarabganj, Gonda (Uttar Pradesh) and also the elder son of Ketki Devi Singh former Lok Sabha MP from Gonda constituency and also a former District Council President. He married Dr. Rajshree Singh in 2011 and has 2 sons. In 2011, he was arrested by Rajasthan Police for the possession of prohibited ammunition under the Arms Act and illegally traveling in a red beacon-fitted car intercepted by a police team.
