= Vladimir Mestvirishvili =

Georgian freestyle wrestling coach

- ვლადიმერ მესტვირიშვილი
- Born: September 13, 1943; Tbilisi, Georgian Soviet Socialist Republic, Soviet Union
- Died: 23 June, 2025; Delhi, India
- Other name: Laado
- Occupation: Wrestling coach
- Years active: 1982–2025
- Employer: Wrestling Federation of India (2003–2017)
- Known for: Coaching India's national wrestling team
- Awards: Padma Shri (posthumous, 2026)

Vladimir Mestvirishvili (Georgian: ვლადიმერ მესტვირიშვილი; born September 13, 1943) was a Georgian freestyle wrestling coach. He served as head coach of the Georgian national wrestling team from 1982 to 1992, and subsequently worked with India's national wrestling setup from 2003 until 2017, before continuing to coach independently at Chhatrasal Stadium in Delhi until his death. Four of the Indian wrestlers he trained won Olympic medals. In January 2026, the Government of India awarded him the Padma Shri posthumously, making him the first foreign coach to receive the honour.

He is credited with helping lay the technical and tactical foundations of India's rise in international freestyle wrestling during the 2000s and 2010s.

== Career ==
He developed his coaching career within the Soviet sports system and served as head coach of the USSR national team from 1979 to 1991, while also coaching the USSR youth national team from 1981.

He served as the head coach of the Georgian national wrestling team from 1982 to 1992. During this period, he trained wrestlers who competed at World Championships and European Championships under the Soviet and later the Georgian flag.

From 1995 to 2000, he was the head coach of the North Macedonia national team and the club Yaka-Muchumi.

Mestvirishvili arrived in India in 2003 and joined the national wrestling coaching setup under the Wrestling Federation of India. He was initially based at the Sports Authority of India centre in Sonepat, Haryana, and later worked at Chhatrasal Stadium in Delhi.

In his early years in India, Mestvirishvili coached Sushil Kumar and Yogeshwar Dutt, who qualified for the 2004 Summer Olympics in Athens in freestyle wrestling. Sushil Kumar subsequently won a bronze medal at Beijing 2008 and a silver medal at the 2012 London Olympics, becoming India's only two-time Olympic wrestling medallist. Yogeshwar Dutt won a bronze medal at London 2012.

He also coached Bajrang Punia during his formative years. Punia won a bronze medal at the 2020 Tokyo Olympics.

The Wrestling Federation of India (WFI) declined to renew Mestvirishvili's contract following the 2016 Rio Olympics, citing his age and a preference for younger coaching staff.

After the conclusion of his WFI contract, he remained in India and continued coaching at Chhatrasal Stadium, where he was brought in by Sushil Kumar to train a younger generation of wrestlers. Among those he worked with during this period were Ravi Dahiya, who won a silver medal at the 2020 Tokyo Olympics, Deepak Punia, a World Championship medallist, and Divya Kakran, who won a gold medal at the 2022 Commonwealth Games.

== Death ==
Mestvirishvili died on 23 June 2025 due to age-related illness. He was 69 years old. Following Mestvirishvili's death, tributes were paid by the Wrestling Federation of India, his former athletes, and sports administrators. Bajrang Punia stated,

"Today, our standing in world wrestling is respectful because of him. He dedicated his life, at least the last two decades of his life, to Indian wrestling."

Yogeshwar Dutt credited him with teaching him and his peers how to compete at the highest level. Former India hockey captain Viren Rasquinha wrote on X:

"Very sad to hear of the passing away of legendary wrestling coach Vladimir Mestvirishvili of Georgia. He coached Sushil, Yogeshwar, Bajrang, Ravi, Deepak and many other top Indian wrestlers during their junior days. He was so dedicated and passionate. Everyone loved him."

In 2026, the Government of India announced him as a posthumous recipient of the Padma Shri for his contribution to Indian wrestling. He was the first foreign coach to be named for the award.
