= Karan Bhushan Singh =

Indian politician

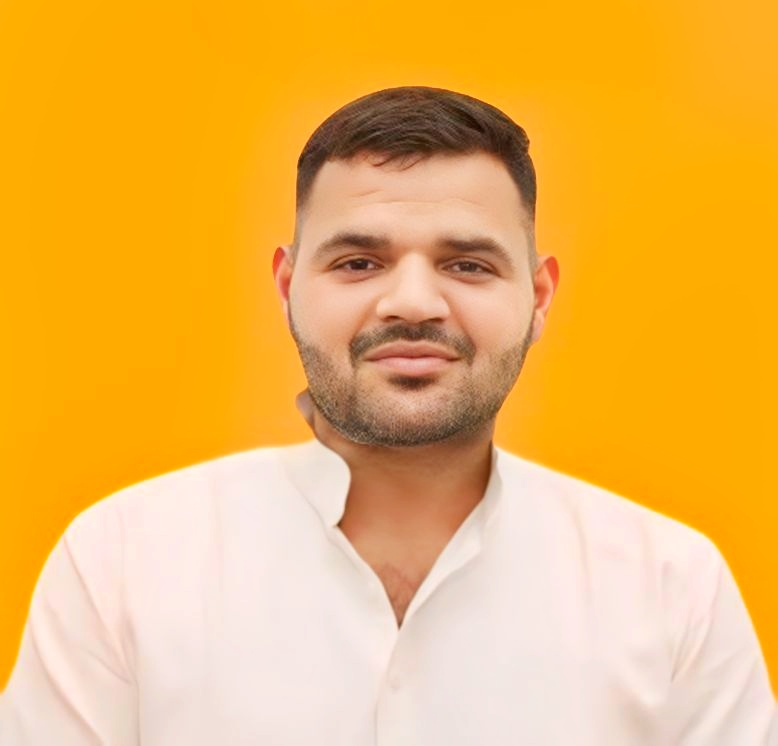

Member of Parliament, Lok Sabha
- Incumbent
- Assumed office 4 June 2024
- Preceded by: Brij Bhushan Sharan Singh
- Constituency: Kaiserganj

President of U.P. Wrestling Association
- Incumbent
- Assumed office 12 February 2024

Personal details
- Born: 13 December 1990 (age 35) Gonda, Uttar Pradesh, India
- Party: Bharatiya Janata Party
- Spouse: Neha Singh (m. 2011)
- Relations: Prateek Bhushan Singh (brother)
- Children: 2
- Parent(s): Brij Bhushan Sharan Singh (father); Ketki Devi Singh (mother)

Karan Bhushan Singh is an Indian politician, member of the Bharatiya Janata Party and the Member of Parliament in the Lok Sabha for Kaiserganj. He is the son of former 6 time MP & former Wrestling Federation of India (WFI) president Brij Bhushan Sharan Singh and Former MP Ketki Devi Singh.His Brother Prateek Bhushan Singh is also 2 time MLA From Gonda.He was made the candidate for Kaiserganj. He is also the president of the Uttar Pradesh Wrestling Association and the president of a cooperative development bank in Nawabganj, Gonda.

== Personal life ==
Karan Bhushan Singh was born on 13 December 1990, to Brij Bhushan Sharan Singh and Ketki Devi Singh. He is the youngest son in his family. His brother Prateek Bhushan Singh (born 9 May 1988) is also an Indian politician, a 2nd Term Member of The Uttar Pradesh Legislative Assembly, representing Gonda.

He received a Bachelor of Business Administration from Dr. Ram Manohar Lohia Avadh University, and a business management diploma in Australia. He is also a former national double trap shooter.

He has two children, one son and one daughter.

== Political career ==
He received 571,263 votes in the 18th Lok Sabha election in Kaiserganj, defeating Samajwadi Party candidate Bhagat Ram Mishra by 148,843 votes.
