= Tarabganj Assembly constituency =

Constituency of the Uttar Pradesh legislative assembly in India

Coordinates: 26.96°N 81.98°E

Tarabganj
- Constituency No. 299 for the Uttar Pradesh Legislative Assembly

Constituency details
- Country: India
- Region: North India
- State: Uttar Pradesh
- District: Gonda
- Established: 2012
- Total electors: 3,67,243
- Reservation: None

Member of Legislative Assembly
- 18th Uttar Pradesh Legislative Assembly
- Incumbent Prem Narayan Pandey
- Party: Bhartiya Janata Party
- Elected year: 2022
- Preceded by: Awadhesh Kumar Singh

Tarabganj is a constituency of the Uttar Pradesh Legislative Assembly covering the city of Tarabganj and other parts of Tarabganj tehsil, in the Gonda district of Uttar Pradesh, India. It was established in 2012 and is one of five assembly constituencies in the Kaiserganj Lok Sabha constituency. Since 2008, this assembly constituency is numbered 299 amongst 403 constituencies.

== Members of the Legislative Assembly ==
Election	Name	Party
1952	Chandra Bhan Sharan Singh	Indian National Congress
1957	Shitala Prasad Singh	Indian National Congress
1962	Shitala Prasad Singh	Indian National Congress
1967	Shitala Prasad Singh	Indian National Congress
1969	Shitala Prasad Singh	Indian National Congress
From 1974 to 2012 : Constituency did not exist
2012	Awadhesh Kumar Singh	Samajwadi Party
2017	Prem Narayan Pandey	Bharatiya Janata Party
2022	Prem Narayan Pandey	Bharatiya Janata Party

== Election results ==
=== 2027 ===
2027 Uttar Pradesh Legislative Assembly election: Tarabganj
Party	Candidate	Votes	%	±%
INDIA				
NDA				
BSP				
NOTA	None of the above			
Majority				
Turnout				
gain from		Swing		

=== 2022 ===
2022 Uttar Pradesh Legislative Assembly election: Tarabganj
Party	Candidate	Votes	%	±%
BJP	Prem Nrayan Pandey	125,325	59.39	▲10.05
SP	Rambhajan Choubey	71,635	33.95	▲3.52
BSP	Lalji	3,751	1.78	▼12.65
INC	Tvarita Singh	2,684	1.27	
NOTA	None of the above	2,408	1.14	▼0.55
Majority		53,690	25.44	▲6.53
Turnout		211,012	57.46	▲0.13
BJP hold		Swing		

=== 2017 ===
2017 Uttar Pradesh Legislative Assembly election: Tarabganj
Party	Candidate	Votes	%	±%
BJP	Prem Narayan Pandey	100,294	49.34	
SP	Vinod Kumar Singh alias Pandit Singh	61,852	30.43	
BSP	Indra Bahadur Singh alias Pappu	29,332	14.43	
Mahakranti Dal	Digvijay	1,827	0.9	
NOTA	None of the above	3,384	1.69	
Majority		38,442	18.91	
Turnout		203,268	57.33	
BJP gain from SP		Swing		

=== 2012 ===
2012 Uttar Pradesh Legislative Assembly election: Tarabganj
Party	Candidate	Votes	%	±%
SP	Awadhesh Kumar Singh alias Manju Singh	52,395	28.16	new seat
BSP	Ram Bhajan Chaubey	47,215	25.37	new seat
BJP	Prem Narayan Pandey	39,924	21.46	new seat
INC	Anand Swaroop Alias Pappu Yadav	15,432	8.29	new seat
Majority		5,180	2.78	new seat
Turnout		1,86,070	57.64	new seat
SP gain from new seat		Swing		
