= Utraula Assembly constituency =

Constituency of the Uttar Pradesh legislative assembly in India

Coordinates: 27.32°N 82.42°E

Utraula
- Constituency No. 293 for the Uttar Pradesh Legislative Assembly

Constituency details
- Country: India
- Region: North India
- State: Uttar Pradesh
- District: Balrampur
- Lok Sabha constituency: Gonda
- Total electors: 4,28,121 (2024)
- Reservation: None

Member of Legislative Assembly
- 18th Uttar Pradesh Legislative Assembly
- Incumbent Ram Pratap Verma
- Party: Bharatiya Janata Party
- Elected year: 2022

Utraula is a constituency of the Uttar Pradesh Legislative Assembly covering the city of Utraula in the Balrampur district of Uttar Pradesh, India. Utraula is one of five assembly constituencies in the Gonda Lok Sabha constituency.

== Members of the Legislative Assembly ==
Year	Member	Party
1957	Ali Jarrar Jafri	Indian National Congress
1962	Suraj Lal Gupta	Bharatiya Jana Sangh
1967	Rafi Mahmood Khan	Indian National Congress
1969	Suraj Lal Gupta	Bharatiya Jana Sangh
1974	Rajendra Prasad Chaudhary	Bharatiya Jana Sangh
1977	Rajendra Prasad Chaudhary	Janata Party
1980	Masroor Zafri	Communist Party of India
1985	Fazlul Bari alias Banne	Independent politician
1989	Samiullah Khan	Independent politician
1991	Samiullah Khan	Janata Dal
1993	Vishavnath Prasad Gupta	Bharatiya Janata Party
1996	Ubaidur Rahman	Samajwadi Party
2002	Anwar Mahmood	Samajwadi Party
2007	Shyam Lal	Bharatiya Janata Party
2012	Arif Anwar Hashmi	Samajwadi Party
2017	Ram Pratap Verma	Bharatiya Janata Party
2022	Ram Pratap Verma	Bharatiya Janata Party

== Election results ==
=== 2027 ===
2027 Uttar Pradesh Legislative Assembly election: Utraula
Party	Candidate	Votes	%	±%
INDIA				
NDA				
AIMIM				
BSP				
Majority				
Turnout				
gain from		Swing		

=== 2022 ===
2022 Uttar Pradesh Legislative Assembly election: Utraula
Party	Candidate	Votes	%	±%
BJP	Ram Pratap Verma	87,162	44.43	+1.49
SP	Hasib Khan	65,393	33.33	+5.09
INC	Dhiru Singh	12,944	6.6	
AIMIM	Abdul Mannan	12,303	6.27	+4.78
BSP	Ram Pratap Verma	9,669	4.93	−17.64
Independent	Gyan Chandra	2,911	1.48	
NOTA	None of the above	1,609	0.82	−0.19
Majority		21,769	11.1	−3.6
Turnout		196,180	45.07	−3.19
BJP hold		Swing		

=== 2017 ===
2017 Uttar Pradesh Legislative Assembly election: Utraula
Party	Candidate	Votes	%	±%
BJP	Ram Pratap Verma	85,240	42.94	
SP	Arif Anwar Hashmi	56,066	28.24	
BSP	Parvez Umar	44,799	22.57	
AIMIM	Nizamullah Khan	2,966	1.49	
NOTA	None of the above	1,977	1.01	
Majority		29,174	14.7	
Turnout		198,526	48.26	
