= Kulappurakkal Karunakaran Nair =

Indian politician (1931–2013)

K. K. Nair
- Born: 2 February 1931 Pathanamthitta district
- Died: 7 February 2013 (aged 82) Vettipuram
- Resting place: Pioneer Cottage, Mundukottackal, Pathanamthitta
- Known for: Founding Pathanamthitta District
- Title: Member of Kerala Legislative Assembly
- Term: 1982-2006
- Predecessor: V.I Idicula
- Successor: K.Sivadasan Nair
- Political party: Communist Party of India(1959-1964) CPI(M)(1959-1979) Independent(1979-2001) INC(2001-2009) BSP(2009-2013)

Kulappurakkal Karunakaran Nair (2 February 1931 – 7 February 2013) was an Indian politician who was a Member of the Legislative Assembly of Kerala state, India. He represented Pathanamthitta for 34 years, from 1972 until 2006 and was instrumental in formation of Pathanamthitta district.

== Personal life ==
He was born to Krishna Pillai and Lekshmi Amma on 2 February 1931.

== Political career ==
Started political life as a student through Communist Movement; became CPI Member in 1959 unsuccessfully contested to the 1960 as a Communist Party candidate. after the split in the communist party. He became a member in CPI(M) and continued till 1979. in 1980 election contested as an independent candidate; during 1982, 1987,1991, and contested 2001 elections contested as INC candidate. He also contested in 2009 Indian general election as a Bahujan Samaj Party candidate. He played a unique part in the formation of Pathanamthitta District in 1982.

He was actively associated with Trade Union and socio-cultural activities. He was served as President of Pathanamthitta Plantations Labour Union and Taxi Drivers Union and Malanadu Trade Union Congress and Vice President of Kollam District Karshaka Sangham.

An independent MLA of Pathanamthitta for eight terms, he served in the 3rd, 4th, 6th, 7th, 8th, 9th, 10th and 11th session of the Kerala Legislative Assembly.

== Formation of Pathanamthitta district ==
Nair is fondly remembered by the natives of Pathanamthitta district, as Father of the DIstrict for fulfilling their dream. The parts of current Pathanamthitta were parts of now-neighbouring Kollam and Alappuzha districts and remoteness posed by it affected the people of region and its development.

Nair, who was representing Pathanamthitta for a long time, visited the then Kerala CM K. Karunakaran, and made an understanding with him for creation of a new district in return of support for Second Karunakaran ministry. Karunakaran told Nair that for fulfilling his dream, Nair has to resign his post. Thus Nair resigned, and on 1 November 1982, Pathanamthitta district came to being. Later, he returned as MLA through by-elections.

He was also instrumental in building New collectorate building, District Cancer Centre Kozhenchery, Pathanamthitta Ring Road, Chuttippara Nursing College, decentralising district offices to Thiruvalla and Kozhencherry etc.

== Death ==
K K Nair died on 7 February 2013 at his residence in Vettipuram and his body was cremated two days later and a hartal was proclaimed in the district following his death. Nair was a bachelor and had no descendants.

== See also ==
- Pathanamthitta district
- K. Karunakaran
- K. K. Nayar
