= Awadhesh Kumar Singh =

Indian politician

Member of Uttar Pradesh Legislative Council
- Incumbent
- Assumed office 12 April 2022
- Preceded by: Mahfooz Khan
- Constituency: Gonda-Balrampur Local Authorities

Member of Uttar Pradesh Legislative Assembly
- In office 6 March 2012 – 11 March 2017
- Preceded by: constituency established
- Succeeded by: Prem Narayan Pandey
- Constituency: Tarabganj

Personal details
- Born: 1 January 1962 (age 64) Tarabganj, Uttar Pradesh
- Party: Bharatiya Janata Party (2016-Present)
- Other political affiliations: Samajwadi Party (2008-2016)
- Parent: Late Jagatpal Singh (father)
- Nickname: Manju Singh

Awadhesh Kumar Singh alias Manju Singh, is an Indian politician from Gonda, Uttar Pradesh.

== Career ==
Singh is a Member of the Uttar Pradesh Legislative Council, representing Gonda-Balrampur Local Authorities, since 2022 as a Bharatiya Janata Party member. He was a Member of the 16th Uttar Pradesh Assembly, from Tarabganj, from 2012 to 2017, on the Samajwadi Party ticket.
