= Rudrasen Chaudhary =

Indian politician

Member of Parliament, Lok Sabha
- In office 1991–1996
- Preceded by: Arif Mohammed Khan
- Succeeded by: Padamsen Chaudhary
- Constituency: Bahraich
- In office 1989–1991
- Preceded by: Rana Vir Singh
- Succeeded by: Laxminarain Mani Tripathi
- Constituency: Kaiserganj
- In office 1977–1980
- Preceded by: Shakuntala Nayar
- Succeeded by: Rana Vir Singh
- Constituency: Kaiserganj

Personal details
- Born: 7 January 1930 Bodhwa, Bahraich district, United Provinces, British India, (present-day Uttar Pradesh, India)
- Died: 1 March 1996 (aged 66)
- Party: Bharatiya Janata Party
- Spouse: Krishna Chaudhary (m. 1952)
- Children: 3 sons, 2 daughters (including Padamsen Chaudhary)
- Parent: Laxminarayan Kairati (father)
- Education: Master of Science (Mathematics)
- Alma mater: Banaras Hindu University

Rudrasen Chaudhary was an Indian politician. He was elected to the Lok Sabha, the lower house of the Parliament of India as a member of the Bharatiya Janata Party.
