= 2023 Indian wrestlers' protest =

Protest against alleged sexual harassment of BJP MP

2023 Indian wrestlers' protests
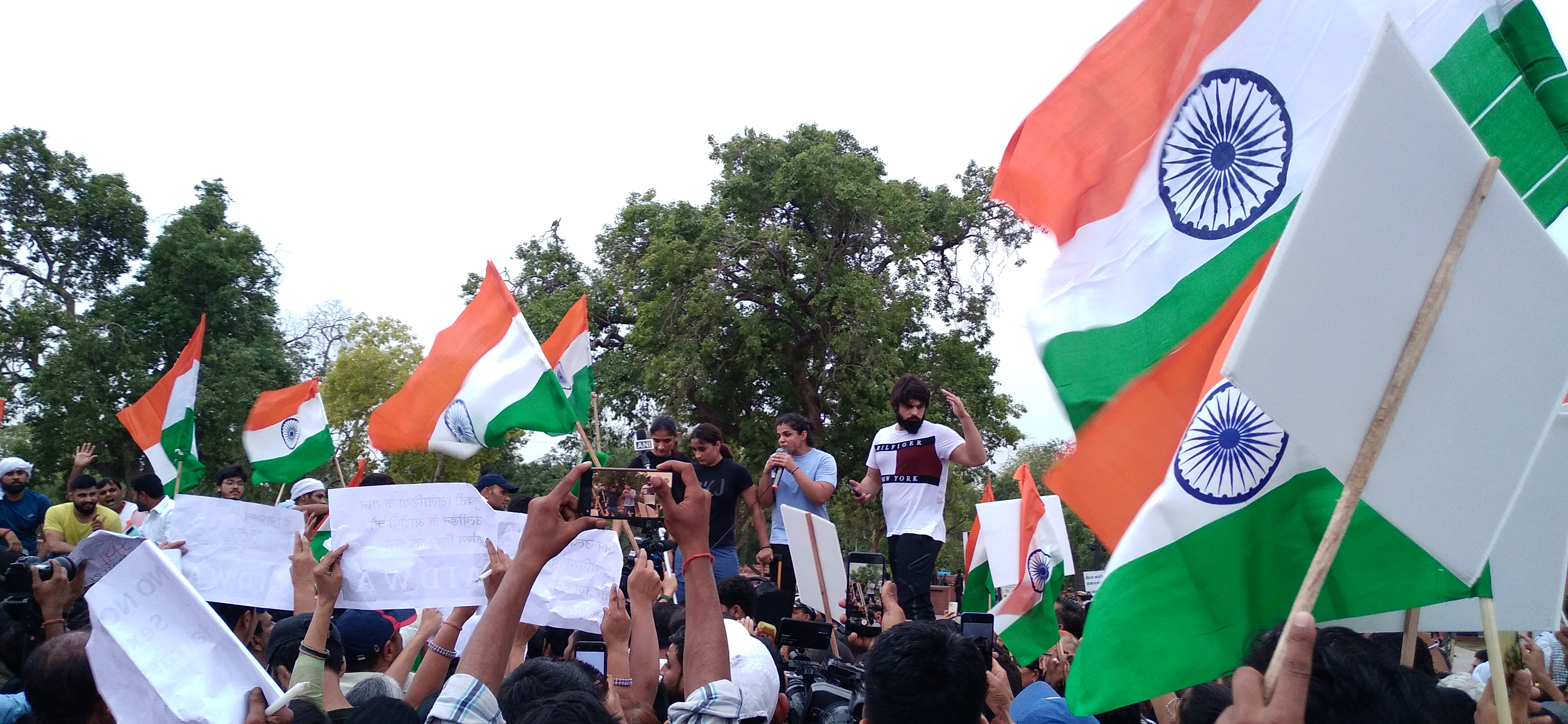
- Wrestlers addressing people during the protest
- Date: 18 January 2023 – 15 June 2023 (4 months, 4 weeks and 1 day)
- Location: Jantar Mantar, New Delhi, India
- Caused by: Allegations of sexual harassment of female wrestlers by the WFI President Brij Bhushan Sharan Singh
- Goals: Arrest of the accused; Public release of oversight committee report; Dissolution of WFI's executive committee
- Methods: Dharna (sit-in), Candlelight march

Parties
Government of India; Ministry of Youth Affairs and Sports; Sports Authority of India; Indian Olympic Association; Wrestling Federation of India; Supported by: Bharatiya Janata Party	Indian wrestlers and non-political bodies: Khap Panchayats; Samyukt Kisan Morcha; Bharatiya Kisan Union; Supported by: Communist Party of India (Marxist); Indian National Congress; Communist Party of India; Aam Aadmi Party; Trinamool Congress; Rashtriya Lok Dal; Dravida Munnetra Kazhagam

Lead figures
Brij Bhushan Sharan Singh	Vinesh Phogat; Sakshi Malik; Bajrang Punia; Sangeeta Phogat; Satyawart Kadian; Somvir Rathee

In January 2023, Indian wrestlers began protesting for investigation into allegations of sexual harassment of female wrestlers by Brij Bhushan Sharan Singh during his tenure as the president of the Wrestling Federation of India (WFI). The female wrestler complainants accused Bhushan of groping, touching their breasts and navels without consent, stalking, intimidation, and demanding "sexual favours" in exchange for professional help, all of which led to a "shared sense of fear and trauma" among the women wrestlers. Bhushan has denied all allegations in front of a government appointed committee.

The sit-in protests were organized at Jantar Mantar, New Delhi in January 2023, making the sexual harassment allegations against Bhushan public. After an assurance that the Central Government will form a committee to look into the allegations, the protests were called off in January 2023. The report by the committee was submitted on 5 April 2023 but not made public. The protesters resumed their protest on 23 April 2023, citing inaction by authorities and bias by the committee to favor the accused.

Bhushan belongs to the Bharatiya Janata Party, which leads the Central government and hence oversees the Delhi Police, the law enforcement agency in Delhi. Delhi Police had been accused of inaction and refusing to register a first information report (FIR). The FIRs were registered only after Supreme Court's intervention even though Indian Law mandates immediate registration of an FIR for cognizable offences like sexual harassment. Bhushan was booked under the POCSO act in which all offenses qualify as cognizable.

Many organizations and opposition parties have accused the government of trying to protect Bhushan, a member of the ruling party. The protesting wrestlers have accused the government of building pressure on them to withdraw their cases against Bhushan. The prime minister Narendra Modi and the Union home minister Amit Shah have both been criticized by the opposition parties for being silent on the case, and Sakshi Malik, one of the protesting wrestlers, said she is "hurt" due to Modi's silence.

Several politicians extended their support to the protests and visited the protest site. Many leading athletes also voiced their support. Many farm unions extended support to the protests claiming that the wrestlers come from farming communities.

The WFI's term expired in December 2021, but due to the controversies, elections were not held. This delay ultimately led to the Indian Olympic Association (IOA) dissolving the WFI's executive body and appointing an ad-hoc committee to oversee its operations in July 2023. The allegations fueled protests and demands for Brij Bhusan’s removal from the post. As a result, the ad-hoc committee decided to conduct repolls on an urgent basis to ensure a transparent and accountable leadership for the WFI.

International sporting bodies United World Wrestling and International Olympic Committee have condemned the manhandling, arrest and temporary detention of the wrestlers on 28 May 2023, and urged the authorities to investigate the allegations against Bhushan failing which Indian athletes would be forced to participate under a neutral flag.

On 25 June 2023, the protesting wrestlers announced they would cease their agitation and expressed their intention to pursue the fight through legal means, rather than through public demonstrations. However, on 24 December 2023, the Union Sports Ministry suspended the newly elected WFI body led by Sanjay Singh citing the WFI's disregard for established policies and procedures.

== Background ==
In January 2023, thirty Indian wrestlers, including Olympic medalists, Vinesh Phogat, Sakshi Malik, Anshu Malik, Bajrang Punia, among others, staged a sit-in accusing Wrestling Federation of India president, Brij Bhushan Sharan Singh and its coaches of sexually harassing female players for years, demanding to disband WFI. The protests were called off in January 2023 due to the government's promise of creating an oversight committee to investigate the allegations. The protesting wrestlers resumed their protests in April 2023, citing inaction by authorities.

There are seven complainants in the case, including a minor. The FIRs in the case mention allegations against Bhushan and WFI secretary Vinod Tomar. The allegations include demanding sexual favours for professional assistance in at least two cases, at least 15 incidents of sexual harassment which include groping, inappropriate touching by running hands over breasts, navel, buttock and several instances of intimidation including stalking. The incidents spanned from 2012 to 2022 and took place in restaurants, WFI offices, at tournaments (both domestic and international) and at a warm-up. The complainant wrestlers state that the acts by Bhushan have traumatized them. The FIRs mention that the women wrestlers went out only in groups to have food to avoid meeting Bhushan alone. One of the complainants stated that Bhushan threatened her with repercussions in the upcoming tournament trials as she resisted his attempts to make physical contact with her. She further stated she was hugely discriminated during the mentioned trials.

Vinesh Phogat, who has won multiple medals at the World Wrestling Championships, claimed she was "mentally harassed, tortured and threatened to be killed" by Bhushan for complaining against him to Prime Minister Modi and sports minister Anurag Thakur. She was made to face widespread media scrutiny for the same under the guise of missing out on a medal at the Tokyo Olympics in 2021. One of these women wrestlers alleged Bhushan sent goons to threaten her family and said they will face "dire consequences" if she told anyone. Another wrestler stated she informed Prime Minister Narendra Modi in person about the alleged harassment, after which he reassured her that the sports ministry will handle the matter.

On 18 May 2023, the accused Bhushan also stated that the wrestlers' Olympic medals were worth ₹15.

Bhushan repeatedly denied the allegations (claiming he would hang himself if a single one was proven) and refused to resign from his post as WFI president. Throughout the protests, he tried to paint those involved as a vocal minority, stating that "90% of players in Haryana support[ed] him" and that the "Tukde Tukde Gang" was behind it all. Bhushan also stated that he would force the government to change the POCSO Act, claiming it, among other laws, were being misused.

== Initial investigation ==
The oversight committee, led by Mary Kom, was formed on 23 January 2023. The committee submitted its report to the Ministry of Youth Affairs and Sports on 5 April after questioning Bhushan and other witnesses. Babita Phogat, member of the oversight committee, alleged that the witnesses' statements were not cross-verified and the objections by her were not included in the report. The findings of the report are not yet made public, but according to Press Trust of India, the report gave a clean chit to the accused Bhushan.

The government-led oversight committee found that the WFI did not have any Internal Complaints Committee (ICC) as mandated by the Prevention of Sexual Harassment (PoSH) Act 2013 to address sexual harassment complaints. The Sexual Harassment Committee which did exist had four men and one woman, violating Indian law requiring all the ICC to be led by a woman and more than half the committee members should be women. The protesting wrestlers allege the government-appointed committee of asking for audio and video proof of sexual harassment incidents. In the FIR, complainants have alleged that the video recordings of their deposition were tampered with to protect Bhushan. The complainants also said that the committee tried to justify the actions of Bhushan and had already decided to act on Singh's instructions to give him a clean chit.

On June 7 2023, the father of a minor wrestler who had filed a complaint under the Protection of Children from Sexual Offences (POCSO) Act against Singh informed a Delhi magistrate that the allegations were false. According to the revised statement, the complaint was made in a moment of frustration after the minor was not selected for the Under-17 Asian Championship trials, after losing in the finals of the trial. The father stated that he had no personal grievance against Singh and that their decision to file the complaint stemmed from a sense of injustice in the selection process. He also cited emotional distress and pressure related to his daughter’s wrestling career as contributing factors.

Following this, the Delhi Police filed a cancellation report on June 15, 2023, citing lack of evidence. The 550-page report included statements from over 20 witnesses, as well as analysis of call records, photographs, and video footage from various wrestling events. The police concluded that the alleged incident did not take place. On May 26 2025, a Delhi court accepted the cancellation report and formally closed the POCSO case against Singh.

== Protest overview ==
=== FIR registration and Supreme court intervention ===
The wrestlers resumed protests in April 2023 at Jantar Mantar in New Delhi demanding the arrest of Bhushan and that the report by the government-appointed committee be made public, claiming that nothing has been done to resolve their issues. Separate police complaints were filed by seven wrestlers against Bhushan but Delhi police did not register an FIR.

When FIR was not filed by the Delhi police, the complainants approached the Supreme Court of India. Before the case could be heard, Kapil Sibal, appearing for the wrestlers said the FIR has not been registered as Bhushan is from the ruling party while Solicitor General Tushar Mehta, appearing for the Delhi Police, sought time for an enquiry against Bhushan but by the day of the hearing, submitted before the court that Delhi Police has decided to register the FIR. The court rejected the plea for appointment of a retired judge for oversight of the investigations. Two FIRs, one under the Protection of Children from Sexual Offenses Act (POCSO Act) and the other for outraging modesty, were filed against Bhushan by the Delhi Police on 28 April after the hearing. Offences under the POCSO act are cognizable, non-bailable and require immediate arrests without a court warrant but the police did not arrest Bhushan which had led to accusations of unequal application of law by many. In addition to POCSO act, the FIRs include IPC sections 354 (assault with intent to outrage woman's modesty), 354A (sexual harassment), 354D (stalking) and 34 (common intention) on Bhushan.

Wrestlers alleged that the government cut off electricity, water and food supplies at the protest site. Delhi Police also detained Delhi University students for supporting the protests.

=== Jantar Mantar clash ===
Delhi Police reported that on 3 May, Aam Aadmi Party MLA Somnath Bharti arrived at the protest site with his supporters carrying camp beds without permission. When the police reportedly intervened, a clash took place between the police and the supporters which was termed "minor altercation" by the police which led to the detainment of Bharti and other supporting politicians. Bajrang Punia, leading the protests, claimed that he, Vinesh, Sangeeta, Dushyant Phogat and Rahul Yadav were assaulted and manhandled by the police and that the beds were purchased by them for sleeping after rainfall. The protesters alleged that a drunk policeman misbehaved with and abused Vinesh Phogat, Sakshi Mallik and Sangeeta Phogat. These clashes resulted in Vinesh suffering a knee injury and Rahul Yadav suffering a head injury. Another allegedly drunk policeman hit Dushyant Phogat which led to a head injury. When the wrestlers demanded his medical test be conducted he was taken away by the police. The Delhi Police on the contrary said no force was used in a press release the following day. There were no women constables present at the site. The protest site was later sealed by heavily barricading all the roads towards it by Delhi police. Delhi Police also "manhandled" a female journalist covering the protests.

=== Formation of SIT and questioning of witnesses ===
The Delhi Police formed a Special Investigation Team (SIT) to investigate the matter which recorded Bhushan's statements and the statements of women wrestlers under Section 164 CrPC before a magistrate. During the investigation, the coach of a complainant, an Olympian wrestler, a Commonwealth medalist wrestler and a referee confirmed about having knowledge of the alleged instances of sexual harassment during the questioning by the Delhi Police. 2010 Commonwealth Games gold medalist Anita Sheoran also corroborated one of the complainant's statement. The Bhushan has been questioned twice by the SIT in which he denied all cases against him, claiming he had been falsely implicated. WFI secretary Vinod Tomar has also been questioned in the case by the SIT. The Delhi Police had allegedly asked for video and photos, and also to recreate the scenes of the sexual harassment incidents as evidence from the protesting wrestlers. The wrestlers also alleged that the government is pressuring them to withdraw the cases against Bhushan. The minor in the case whose statement were recorded under 164 CrPC had withdrawn her case, allegedly due to pressure on her father.

Legal experts state that a woman's testimony is the primary evidence in sexual harassment cases as there is usually no photo or video of the acts of sexual harassment. The court also needs to confirm if there is a motive to make up the allegations by the complainants in such cases. The police can ask photos or videos of the incident, but this evidence is not necessary for the complainant to provide. Legal experts also raised concerns the way Delhi Police has investigated the matter.

=== New Parliament House march and detainment ===
An advisory committee of the protesters decided that a women's mahapanchayat will be held at the New Parliament House in New Delhi during its inauguration by Narendra Modi on 28 May 2023. The protesters were warned by Delhi police to not march towards the Inauguration site.

On 28 May 2023, before the planned march towards the location of New Parliament House, Delhi and Haryana police began heavily barricading and arrests to prevent supporters from reaching and joining the march Many villages in Haryana witnessed heavy police presence to avoid people from leaving for Delhi. The Delhi Police also barricaded borders of Delhi to stop Khap leaders and farmers to join the wrestler's march. Several farm leaders and their supporters were detained from the borders and arrested.

As the protesters started marching towards the New Parliament House peacefully they were pushed, forcefully dragged and detained by the Delhi Police and the security personnel after being stopped by them. The wrestlers after being detained were forced into police buses and taken to different police stations. The detained protesters accused the government of trying to silence them through police brutality. Protesters alleged they were protesting peacefully when the police personnel starting dragging them and that even women were dragged and their clothes were torn by the Delhi Police in its heavy-handed action against them. At least 15 security personnel, mostly police women, were injured. The police also booked around 700 people, including 109 protesters on charges of rioting and obstructing public servants in discharge of duty. After the clash and the detainment, Delhi Police cleared the protesting site by removing the cots, mattresses, cooler fans and tarpaulin ceiling stating that permanent sit-in protests will not be allowed.

On the day of the arrests, several photographs of Vinesh, Punia and Malik started circulating on social media where they could be seen smiling. Bajrang Punia claimed that such photos were morphed by an "IT cell". Delhi police stated that it will convert a school in Outer-Delhi to function as a temporary jail viewing the law and order situation near the New Parliament building. This request was rejected by the Delhi Mayor. The arrest of protesting wrestlers by Delhi Police was widely condemned.

On 30 May 2023, Bajrang Punia, Sakshi Malik and Vinesh Phogat said they will throw their medals in the Ganga river and fast indefinitely at the India Gate. After being convinced by Naresh Tikait and several other farmer leaders, the wrestlers returned without immersing their medals. On the same day, farmer union Samyukt Kisan Morcha called for nationwide support of the protests on 1 June 2023.

A video disclosing the identity of a minor girl complainant in the case got viral on social media, which is a criminal offence under the POCSO Act and the Section 228-A of the Indian Penal Code. Delhi Commission for Women demanded a case be filed against the person disclosing the identity of the complainant.

=== Meeting with Sports Minister and filing chargesheet ===
On 7 June 2023, the protesting wrestlers met sports minister Anurag Thakur and announced suspension of protests till 15 June, and said they will resume if no action is taken by the government by then. The wrestlers also stated that the government assured them of scrapping the charges filed against them during their march towards the inauguration ceremony of the New Parliament. On 15 June, Delhi Police filed chargesheet in the case against Brij Bhushan under sections 354 (use of criminal force for outraginging modesty), 354A (sexual harassment), and 354D (stalking) of the Indian Penal Code and Vinod Tomar under sections 109 (abetment of crime) and 506 (criminal intimidation), and reported that the minor's case had been cancelled. The protesting wrestlers allege that the Delhi Police has weakened the charges levelled against Bhushan in order to protect him, as the police sought to cancel the minor complainant's case.

== Aftermath ==
Brij Bhushan's aide, Sanjay Singh won the election held on 21 December for the president of WFI, beating Anita Sheoran who the protesting wrestlers supported. Vinesh Phogat said that Sanjay Singh was the "right-hand man" of Brij Bhushan. To protest his election to the president's post Sakshi Malik announced her retirement from wrestling on the same day.

In the wake of Sakshi Malik's dramatic retirement from wrestling in protest against the controversial election of Sanjay Singh as WFI president, Bajrang Punia, another Olympic medalist and vocal critic of the federation's leadership, chose to return his prestigious Padma Shri award, expressed by writing a letter to PM Narendra Modi.

Following in the footsteps of fellow wrestlers Sakshi Malik and Bajrang Punia, Vinesh Phogat has also decided to take a strong stance against the Wrestling Federation of India (WFI) by threatening to return her national awards. In a letter addressed to Prime Minister Narendra Modi, Phogat expressed her deep disappointment with the WFI's leadership and its handling of sexual harassment allegations against former president Brij Bhushan Sharan Singh.

Prior to the election, Indian wrestlers had been participating as neutral players as WFI had missed the United World Wrestling's deadline to elect a new president by August 2023.

However, on 24 December 2023, the Union Sports Ministry suspended the newly elected WFI body led by Sanjay Singh citing the WFI's disregard for established policies and procedures. Specifically, the ministry was upset by the hasty decisions made regarding upcoming wrestling competitions, with concerns about transparency and due process as the new WFI announced national competitions before finalizing proper guidelines and protocols. Also, there were complaints regarding the selection process for these competitions, raising concerns about fairness and objectivity.

== Reactions ==
=== Domestic ===
Several opposition leaders visited the protest sites. These included :-

- Arvind Kejriwal,
- Bhupinder Singh Hooda,
- Priyanka Gandhi,
- Navjot Singh Sidhu
- Udit Raj
- Brinda Karat.

Other opposition leaders expressed support for the protests. These included :-

- M. K. Stalin,
- Mamata Banerjee,: organized a march on streets supporting the protests and calling it "a struggle for life, justice, and independence".
- Siddaramaiah,
- Rahul Gandhi,
- Kalvakuntla Kavitha.

Few of the ruling party leaders also voiced their support for the protests. These included :-

- Satya Pal Malik,
- Anil Vij,
- Brijendra Singh
- Birender Singh
- Maneka Gandhi

Many Indian athletes extended their support on social media such as.:-

- Abhinav Bindra
- Neeraj Chopra
- Sania Mirza
- Shiva Keshavan
- Nikhat Zareen
- Harbhajan Singh
- Sunil Chhetri
- Anil Kumble
- Rani Rampal
- Virender Sehwag
- Viren Rasquinha
- Kapil Dev
- Shikha Pandey
- Irfan Pathan

1983 World Cup-winning cricket team, excluding Roger Binny, issued a joint statement in support of the protests. Madan Lal criticised the involvement of political parties while voicing his support for the protests.

Yoga guru Ramdev also expressed his opinions while demanding for the arrest of Bhushan. Indian actors Naseeruddin Shah, Tovino Thomas, Ritika Singh supported the protests on social media.

On 7 May 2023, Bharatiya Kisan Union spokesperson Rakesh Tikait and Samyukt Kisan Morcha's Baldev Singh Sirsa joined the protesters at Jantar Mantar. On the same day, four national women associations called for support of wrestler protests by holding out meetings and exposing the anti-women face of the BJP. People from Prime Minister Narendra Modi's adopted village in Varanasi organised sit-ins in support of women wrestlers. Sikh body Shiromani Gurdwara Parbandhak Committee also extended their support to protesting wrestlers.

Delhi Commission for Women chairperson Swati Maliwal condemned the detention and manhandling of wrestlers by the Delhi Police and demanded immediate arrest of Bhushan.

==== Criticism ====
P. T. Usha, retired Indian athlete and head of the Indian Olympic Association, criticized the protests, called them "amounted to indiscipline" and were "tarnishing image of India". She later visited the site of protest assuring her support.

Rajput Mahasabha in Uttar Pradesh's Muzaffarnagar and Lucknow extended their support to Bhushan, calling the protests were being held 'to insult a Kshatriya'.

=== International ===
==== United World Wrestling ====
International wrestling body United World Wrestling condemned the treatment of wrestlers by the Delhi police. It expressed disappointment over poor investigations by the relevant authorities. They provided a 45-day deadline for elections for a new WFI administration and a failure to do so may lead to the suspension of WFI by UWW, thereby forcing the athletes to compete under a neutral flag like Russia and Belarus. After continued delays in conducting the election, UWW suspended WFI on August 24, which resulted in Indian wrestlers using a neutral flag in the 2023 World Wrestling Championships.

==== International Olympic Committee ====
The International Olympic Committee called the treatment of Indian wrestlers by the police ‘very disturbing’ and for a speedy investigation against former WFI chief Brij Bhushan Singh.

“The IOC insists that the allegations by the wrestlers are followed up by an unbiased, criminal investigation in line with local law,” an IOC spokesperson told Sportstar.

“We understand that the first step towards such a criminal investigation has been made, but more steps have to follow before concrete actions become visible. We urge that the safety and well-being of these athletes be duly considered throughout this process and that this investigation will be speedily concluded.”

==== Parliamentarians ====
Many parliamentarians from outside India had issued a joint statement extending their support for the protests and condemning the arrest and detention of protesting wrestlers.

== Media coverage ==
Bengali and national English newspapers covered the protests prominently on front pages and editorials but, most of the national and mainstream media channels and newspapers ignored the protests or tried to portray it in a negative light to shield the government.

Protester Sakshi Malik shared screenshot of TV news channel Aaj Tak claiming that she abandoned the protests. She refuted the claims.

== Impact ==
The 2023 Asian Wrestling Championships were moved from New Delhi, India to Astana, Kazakhstan due to the pending inquiry of the oversight committee against the Wrestling Federation of India.

== Gallery ==
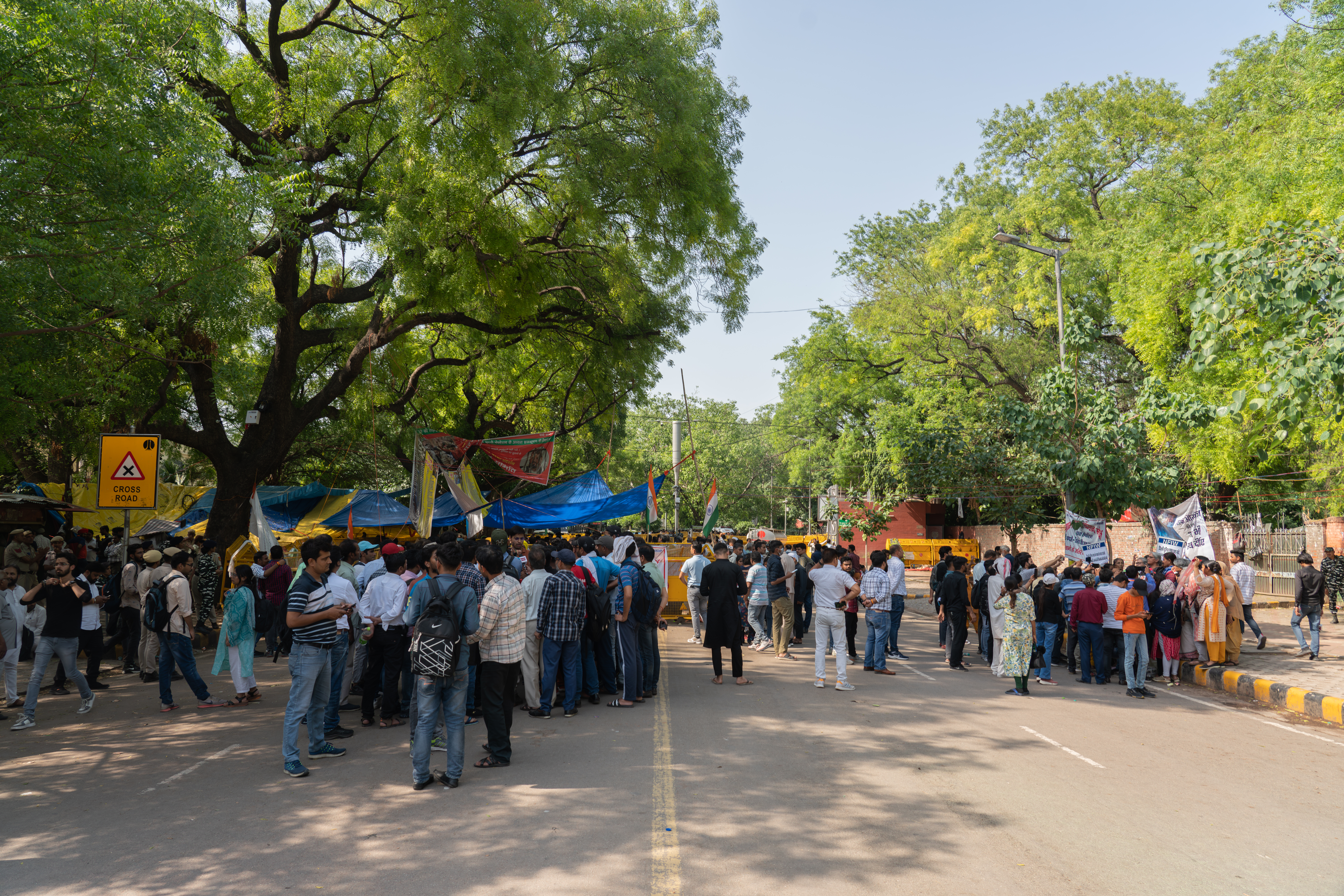
2023 Indian wrestlers' protest site

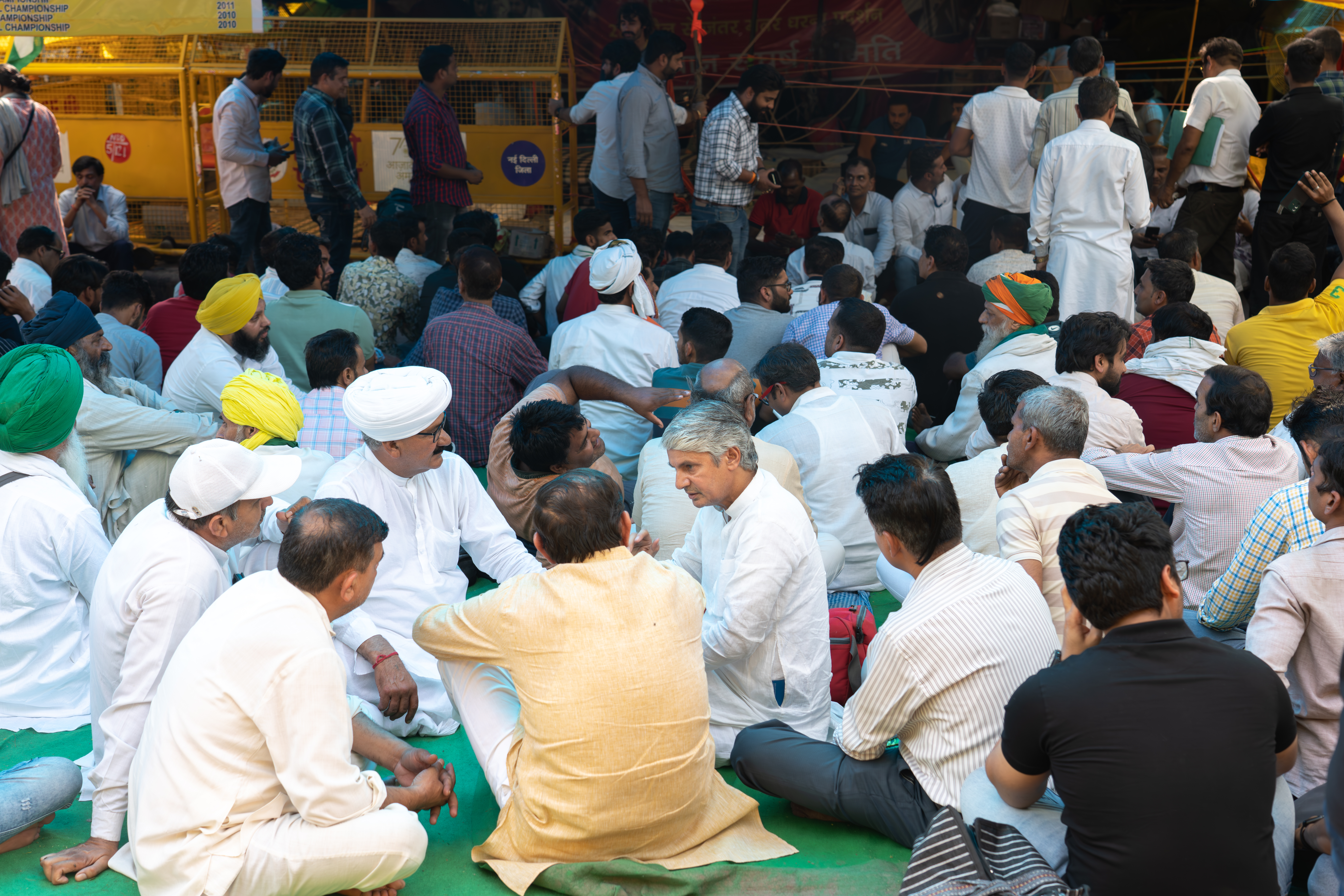
Demonstrator sitting at 2023 Indian wrestlers' protest

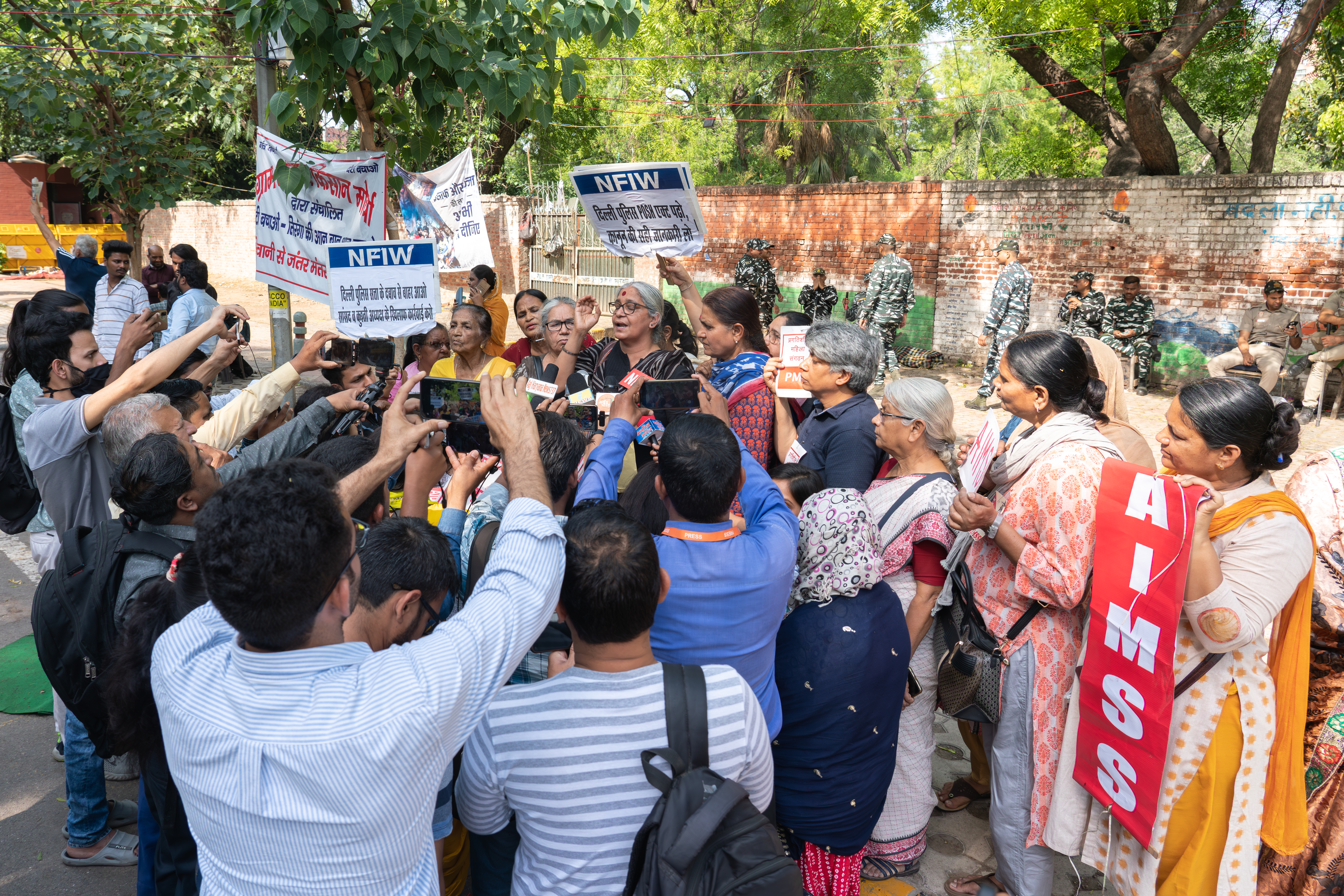
Leaders of different women's organisations talking to the reporters at 2023 Indian wrestlers' protest

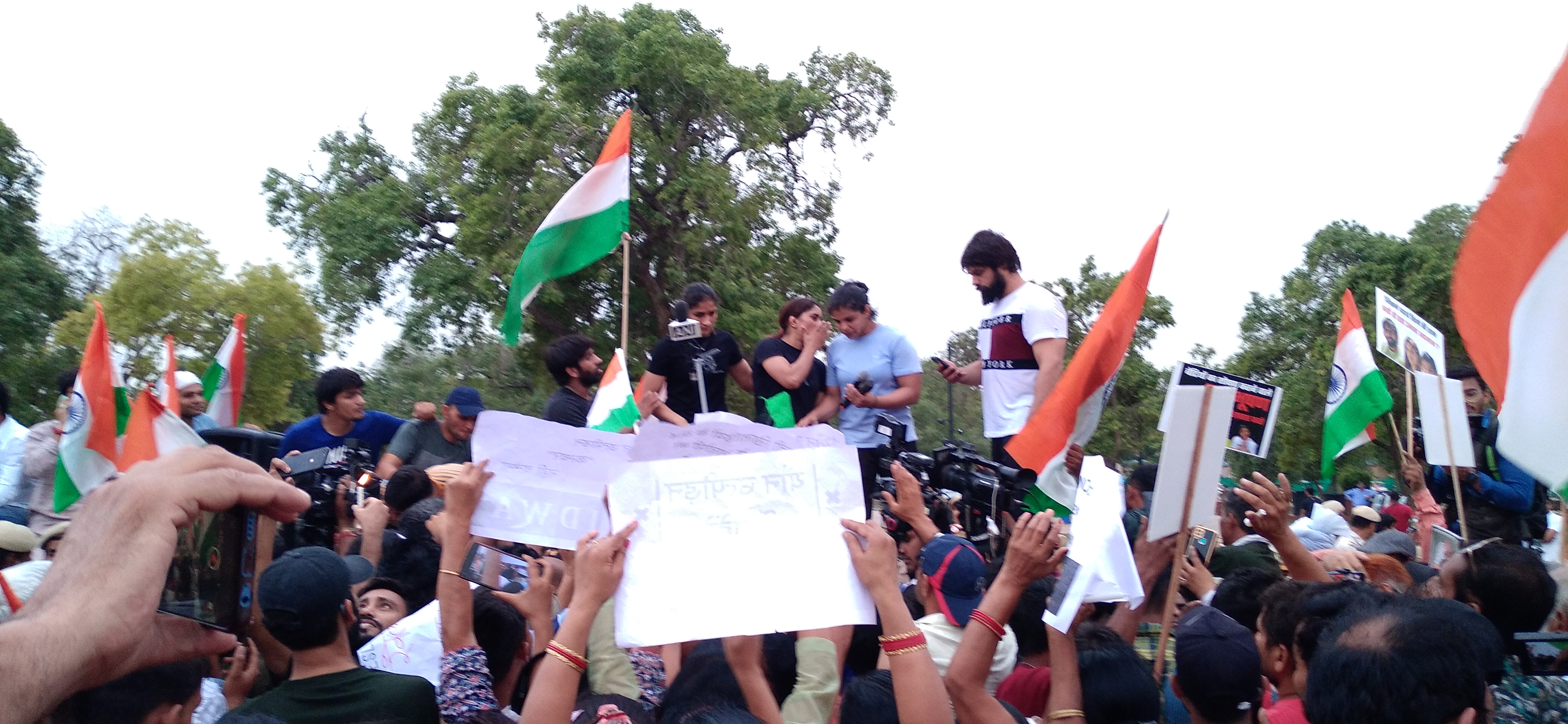
Medalist Wrestlers On Candle March At India Gate

== See also ==
- 2020–2021 Indian farmers' protest
- Rubiales affair, which occurred the same year
