= Sakshi Malik =

Indian wrestler (born 1992)

Sakshi Malik OLY
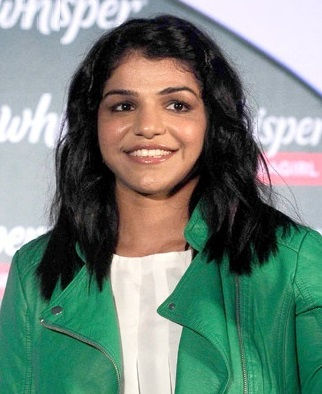
- Malik in 2016

Personal information
- Full name: Sakshi Malik Kadian
- Born: 3 September 1992 (age 34) Mokhra, Haryana, India
- Height: 1.62 m (5 ft 4 in)
- Spouse: Satyawart Kadian

Sport
- Sport: Wrestling
- Event: Freestyle wrestling
- Coached by: Ishwar Dahiya (2004-2009); Mandeep Singh (2010-2023)
- Retired: 2023
Medal record
Women's Freestyle Wrestling
Representing India
Olympic Games
Bronze medal – third place	2016 Rio de Janeiro	58kg
Commonwealth Games
Gold medal – first place	2022 Birmingham	62kg
Silver medal – second place	2014 Glasgow	58kg
Bronze medal – third place	2018 Gold Coast	62kg
Asian Championships
Silver medal – second place	2017 New Delhi	60kg
Bronze medal – third place	2015 Doha	60kg
Bronze medal – third place	2018 Bishkek	62kg
Bronze medal – third place	2019 Xi'an	62kg
South Asian Games
Gold medal – first place	2019 Kathmandu	62kg
Commonwealth Championships
Gold medal – first place	2017 Johannesburg	62kg
Bronze medal – third place	2013 Johannesburg	63kg
World Junior Championships
Bronze medal – third place	2010 Budapest	59kg
Asian Junior Championships
Gold medal – first place	2012 Almaty	63kg
Silver medal – second place	2009 Manila	59kg

Sakshi Malik (born 3 September 1992) is a former Indian freestyle wrestler. At the 2016 Rio Olympics, she won the bronze medal in the 58 kg category, becoming the first Indian female wrestler to win a medal at the Olympics. She is a recipient of the Khel Ratna Award in 2016, India's highest sporting honour, and the Padma Shri in 2017, the country's fourth-highest civilian award. In 2024, she became the first Indian wrestler to feature in Time magazine's list of the 100 most influential people in the world.

== Early life ==
Studied from jawahar navodaya vidhyalaya, Malik was born on 3 September 1992 in Mokhra village of Haryana's Rohtak district to Sukhbir, a bus conductor with Delhi Transport Corporation, and Sudesh Malik, a supervisor at a local health clinic. According to her father, she was motivated to take up wrestling from seeing her grandfather Badlu Ram, who was also a wrestler. She began training in wrestling at the age of 12 under a coach, Ishwar Dahiya, at an Akhara in Chhotu Ram Stadium, Rohtak. However, there were four people out there namely, Kuldeep Malik, Ishwar Dahiya, Mandeep Singh, and Rajbir Singh who claimed themselves as the coach of Sakshi Malik. Later on, Sakshi herself submitted an affidavit with the sports department, informing that Ishwar Dahiya and Mandeep Singh are her coaches.

== Career ==
Malik's first success as a professional wrestler in the international arena came in 2010 at the Junior World Championships where she won the bronze medal in the 58 kg freestyle event. At the 2014 Dave Schultz International Tournament, she won gold in the 60 kg category. And after that, she never stopped and maintained her passion and dedication to the game.

=== 2014 ===
Malik began her campaign at the 2014 Glasgow Commonwealth Games winning her quarterfinal bout against Edwige Ngono Eyia of Cameroon by a 4–0 margin. In the semifinal, she faced Braxton Stone of Canada whom she defeated 3–1 to assure herself of a medal. Her opponent in the final was Aminat Adeniyi of Nigeria who defeated her 4–0 in a closely contested bout. At the 2014 World Championships in Tashkent, she faced Anta Sambou of Senegal in the Round of 16, and won the bout 4–1. She crashed out of the tournament after a 1–3 loss to Petra Olli of Finland.

=== 2015 ===
At the 2015 Asian Championships in Doha, Qatar, in a total of five rounds in the 60 kg category, Malik battled through two rounds to finish in the third position and claim a bronze medal. In the first round, she faced Luo Xiaojuan of China but was beaten 4–5 by the fall verdict. She came back strongly in the second round to beat Munkhtuya Tungalag of Mongolia 13–0, before losing in the third round to Yoshimi Kayama of Japan. She was able to clinch the bronze medal in the fourth round, beating Ayaulym Kassymova of Kazakhstan.

=== 2016 ===
Malik qualified for the 2016 Rio Olympics by defeating China's Zhang Lan in the semifinal of the 58 kg category at the Olympic World Qualifying Tournament in May 2016. At the Olympics, she won her Round of 32 bout against Sweden's Johanna Mattsson and Round of 16 bout against Moldova's Mariana Cherdivara. After losing to the eventual finalist Valeria Koblova of Russia in the quarterfinal, she qualified for the repechage round where she defeated Pürevdorjiin Orkhon of Mongolia in her first bout. She won the bronze medal after an 8–5 victory over the reigning Asian champion Aisuluu Tynybekova of Kyrgyzstan, despite trailing 0–5 at one stage, in the repechage medal playoff, and became India's first female wrestler to win an Olympic medal.

=== 2017 ===
Sakshi Malik represented 'Colors Delhi Sultans' in the second edition of the Pro Wrestling League held in January 2017. She has also been featured in the women's day campaign called #EveryWomanStrong for her sponsor JSW Group.

=== 2022 ===
In 2022, she competed at the Yasar Dogu Tournament held in Istanbul, Turkey. She won the bronze medal in her event at the 2022 Tunis Ranking Series event held in Tunis, Tunisia. She won the gold medal at 2022 Birmingham Commonwealth Games.

=== 2023 ===
She announced her voluntary retirement with grief. After putting the shoes on the table at a press conference, she said she would never participate in wrestling because the close aide of Brijbhushan Singh, MP and former WFI chief was polluting the federation.

== Personal life ==
Malik is currently employed with Indian Railways in the commercial department of its Delhi division, in the Northern Railway zone and she is a part of the JSW Sports Excellence Program. Following her bronze medal win at Rio, she was promoted from senior clerk to gazetted officer rank.

Malik has completed a master's degree in physical education from Maharshi Dayanand University in Rohtak. In September 2016, she was appointed as the university's wrestling director.

In an interview shortly after the Rio Olympics, Malik said she was engaged to be married to fellow wrestler Satyawart Kadian later in 2016. They got married on 2 April 2017. Kadian is also an international level wrestler and has won medals in Asian Games and Commonwealth Games.

Malik, along with Vinesh Phogat and other wrestlers, accused Brij Bhushan Singh, a member of the Lok Sabha and the president of the Wrestling Federation of India of sexual and mental harassment. They organised Indian wrestlers' protest in January 2023 and demanded the dissolution of the Wrestling Federation of India (WFI). The government's assurance to form an oversight committee to investigate the claims caused the protests to be dropped in January 2023. In April 2023, the protesting wrestlers returned to their rallies, claiming that the government was doing nothing. In December 2023, she announced her retirement from wrestling after the election of a close aide of Brij Bhushan Sharan Singh as WFI chief.

On November 14 2024, She gave birth to a baby girl named Yoshida Kadian.

== Awards and recognition ==
- Padma Shri (2017) - fourth highest Indian national honour
- Major Dhyan Chand Khel Ratna (2016) - highest sporting honour of India
- Multiple cash prizes totaling over ₹5.7 crore (US$610,000) from the Indian Railways, the Indian Olympic Association, the Ministry of Youth Affairs and Sports, the Government of Delhi, various state governments, including Haryana, Madhya Pradesh, Uttar Pradesh, from private bodies such as the JSW Group and from political groups including the Indian National Lok Dal.
- Promotion to gazetted officer rank by her employer, the Indian Railways.
- Class 2 job offer from the Government of Haryana.
- 500 yd^{2} land grant from the Government of Haryana.

== In popular culture ==
In 2022, Malik appeared in a short documentary by German broadcaster Deutsche Welle about women in wrestling, featuring young wrestler Payal Sharma. The documentary features Malik training Sharma on her way to be a professional wrestler, as well as a traditionally held gender roles in India and, in particular, women in sports.
