= Padamsen Chaudhary =

Indian politician

Member of Uttar Pradesh Legislative Council
- Incumbent
- Assumed office 2023
- Constituency: elected by Legislative Assembly members

Member of Parliament, Lok Sabha
- In office 1996-1998
- Preceded by: Rudrasen Chaudhary
- Succeeded by: Arif Mohammed Khan
- In office 1999-2004
- Preceded by: Arif Mohammed Khan
- Succeeded by: Rubab Sayda
- Constituency: Bahraich

Personal details
- Born: 5 December 1955 (age 70)
- Party: Bharatiya Janata Party
- Spouse: Pushpa Chaudhary
- Parent: Rudrasen Chaudhary(Father)

Padamsen Chaudhary is an Indian politician. He is a member of the Uttar Pradesh Legislative Council. He was also elected to the Lok Sabha, the lower house of the Parliament of India as a member of the Bharatiya Janata Party. He is also Vice President of BJP.
