= K. K. Nayar =

Indian politician (1907–1977)

K. K. Nair
- Born: Karunakaran Pillai; 11 September 1907; Quilon, Travancore (present-day Kuttanad, Alappuzha, Kerala)
- Died: 7 September 1977 (aged 69)
- Spouse(s): Sarasamma (divorced); Shakuntala Nayar (m.1946)
- Children: 2

Kadangalathil Karunakaran Nayar or K. K. Nayar or K. K. Nair (born as Karunakaran Pillai, 11 September 1907 — 7 September 1977) was an Indian Bureaucrat and politician who was a member of the Lok Sabha. He played a crucial role in Ayodhya Ram Janmabhoomi dispute.

== Personal life ==
Nayar was born as Karunakaran Pillai, one of the six children of Kandamkalathil Sankara Panicker and Parvathy Amma at Central Travancore ( present-day Kuttanad, Kerala ) in 1907. His original name was Karunakaran Pillai, also known as Karunakaran Nair. 'Pillai' is a title of nobility in Travancore, while 'Nair' indicates his caste, Nairs interchangeably use both surnames. He completed his early education from Sanatana Dharma Vidyashala, Alleppey, SMV High School, Thiruvananthapuram, University College Thiruvananthapuram (then under University of Madras) Barah Saini College, Aligarh (Agra University)(1954-56) and University College London (1928-30).

He was married to Sarasamma from Thiruvananthapuram after his studies and had a son named Sudhakaran. On his posting to United Provinces they divorced. Later he remarried to Shakuntala Nayar from a Kshatriya family, native of Uttar Pradesh in April 1946 and have a child named Marthanda Vikraman Nayar.

== Public career ==
Nayar joined Indian Civil Service in 1930 and served in various positions in Uttar Pradesh including Gonda (1946), Faizabad (1 June 1949 - 14 March 1950). He was the District magistrate having control over Ayodhya when Ram lalla idol was found inside Babri Masjid in 1949. He took voluntary retirement from service in 1952 and practiced law at the Allahabad High Court. Thereafter he joined Bharatiya Jana Sangh and was a member of Uttar Pradesh Legislative Assembly from 1965 to 1967. He got elected to 4th Lok Sabha from Bahraich (Lok Sabha constituency) as a candidate of Bharatiya Jan Sangh.

== See also ==
- K. K. Muhammed
- K. K. Nair
- Shakuntala Nayar
- Ayodhya dispute
