= Mohammad Jalil Khan =

Indian politician

- मोहम्मद जलील ख़ान

Member of Uttar Pradesh Legislative Assembly
- In office May 2007 – Mar 2012
- Preceded by: Pandit Singh
- Succeeded by: Pandit Singh
- Constituency: Gonda

Personal details
- Born: 1 October 1959 Gonda, Uttar Pradesh
- Died: 14 June 2018 (aged 58) Gonda, Uttar Pradesh
- Party: Bahujan Samaj Party

Mohd Jalil Khan (1 October 1959 – 14 June 2018) was an Indian politician. As a member of the member of the Bahujan Samaj Party, he was elected in 2007 to the Uttar Pradesh Legislative Assembly from the Gonda Assembly constituency.

Khan died on 14 June 2018.
