= Brij Bhushan Sharan Singh =

Indian politician (born 1957)

- Official portrait

Member of Parliament, Lok Sabha
- In office 16 May 2009 – 4 June 2024
- Preceded by: Beni Prasad Verma
- Succeeded by: Karan Bhushan Singh
- Constituency: Kaiserganj
- In office 17 May 2004 – 16 May 2009
- Preceded by: Rizwan Zaheer
- Succeeded by: Constituency Demolished Now Shravasti
- Constituency: Balrampur
- In office 10 October 1999 – 6 February 2004
- Preceded by: Kirti Vardhan Singh
- Succeeded by: Kirti Vardhan Singh
- Constituency: Gonda
- In office 20 June 1991 – 10 May 1996
- Preceded by: Raja Anand Singh
- Succeeded by: Ketki Devi Singh
- Constituency: Gonda

President of Wrestling Federation of India
- In office 5 April 2012 – 21 December 2023
- Preceded by: Deepender Singh Hooda
- Succeeded by: Sanjay Singh

Personal details
- Born: 8 January 1957 (age 69) Gonda, Uttar Pradesh, India
- Party: Bharatiya Janata Party (1987–2008, 2014–present); Samajwadi Party (2008–2014)
- Spouse: Ketki Devi Singh (m. 1981)
- Children: 4, including Prateek Bhushan Singh and Karan Bhushan Singh
- Parents: Jagdamba Sharan Singh (father); Pyari Devi (mother)
- Education: M.A., L.L.B.
- Website: brijbhushansingh.in
- Nickname: Neta Ji
- As of 29 June, 2025

Brijbhushan Sharan Singh (born 8 January 1957) is an Indian politician and a six-term former Member of Parliament (MP) as a member of the Bharatiya Janata Party. He has also served as the president of the Wrestling Federation of India (WFI).

His political career is marked by many controversies; he was arrested in the demolition of the Babri Masjid case and booked under the anti-terrorism law TADA for harbouring the shooters of the Dawood Ibrahim gang. However, he was later acquitted in both cases. In an interview he admitted that they have committed murder once in a lifetime as self defense.

He was at the centre of accusations of sexual harassment of India's top female wrestlers before getting cleared of the charges. Seven female wrestlers, including one minor, had testified against him in a first information report (FIR). These accusations led to the 2023 wrestlers' protests at Jantar Mantar in New Delhi. Singh was however acquitted of the charges in August 2026.

== Early life and education ==
Brijbhushan Sharan Singh was born on 8 January 1957 in Gonda, Uttar Pradesh to Rajputs, Pyari Devi and Jagadamba Sharan Singh. He studied law at Saket P.G. College in Ayodhya.

== Family ==
He married Ketki Devi Singh in 1981; they have three sons and a daughter. In 2004, their elder son, Shakti Sharan Singh, committed suicide at the age of 23. Reportedly, he shot himself with a licensed pistol and blamed his father's selfish attitude in a suicide note. His other sons are Prateek Bhushan Singh, who has been the BJP MLA of Gonda since 2017, and Karan Bhushan Singh, who is the vice president of WFI and succeeded his father as the BJP MP from Kaiserganj.

== Political career ==
Brijbhushan Sharan Singh is a six-time Member of Parliament, five times as a member of the Bharatiya Janata Party and once as a member of the Samajwadi Party. In his early political career, he was closely associated with the erstwhile Raja of Mankapur, Anand Singh, serving as a junior aide for several years. Following differences, he broke away and contested against Anand Singh in the 1989 Uttar Pradesh Sugarcane Federation elections. Drawing on the political experience gained during this period, he later challenged Anand Singh again in the 1991 Lok Sabha elections on a BJP ticket taking advantage of the Ram Janmabhoomi movement. In 1991, he was elected to the 10th Lok Sabha from Gonda constituency in Uttar Pradesh as the Bharatiya Janata Party candidate. He was re-elected to the 13th Lok Sabha in 1999 from the same constituency. In 2004, he was re-elected to 14th Lok Sabha from Balrampur constituency in Uttar Pradesh state on the BJP ticket.

On 20 July 2008, he joined the Samajwadi Party after the BJP expelled him for cross-voting in the parliament during the 2008 Lok Sabha vote of confidence. In 2009, he was re-elected to 15th Lok Sabha from Kaiserganj constituency in Uttar Pradesh state. He rejoined the BJP months before the 16th general election and was a member of 17th Lok Sabha from BJP. He was the President of Wrestling Federation of India (WFI) from 2012 to 2023.

== Positions held ==
Brij Bhushan Sharan Singh was elected 6 times as Lok Sabha MP from 3 different constituencies.

#	From	To	Position	Constituency	Party
1.	1991	1996	MP (1st term) in 10th Lok Sabha	Gonda	BJP
2.	1999	2004	MP (2nd term) in 13th Lok Sabha	Gonda	BJP
3.	2004	2009	MP (3rd term) in 14th Lok Sabha	Balrampur	BJP
4.	2009	2014	MP (4th term) in 15th Lok Sabha	Kaiserganj	SP
5.	2014	2019	MP (5th term) in 16th Lok Sabha	Kaiserganj	BJP
6.	2019	2024	MP (6th term) in 17th Lok Sabha	Kaiserganj	BJP

== Controversies ==
According to police records, 38 criminal cases were lodged against Singh between 1974 and 2007. In particular, the FIRs were filed under the stringent Gangsters and Goonda Acts for various charges, including theft, dacoity, murder, criminal intimidation, attempt to murder and kidnapping, though he was acquitted in most of the cases according to his election affidavit.

=== Legal issues ===
Singh encountered as many as 38 cases against him under various charges including theft, criminal intimidation, murder, attempt to murder, rioting, and kidnapping.

In 1992, he was involved in the Babri Masjid Demolition case and, along with 39 other people, was arrested by the Central Bureau of Investigation (CBI). He was the prime suspect but was acquitted by the Supreme Court of India in 2020. According to The Wire, he later said, "During the movement, I was the first person from the area to be arrested by Mulayam Singh. I was also the first person arrested by the CBI after the controversial structure was demolished."

In 1993, under the Terrorist and Disruptive Activities (Prevention) Act, he was charged with helping associates of Dawood Ibrahim, who allegedly organised the J.J Hospital Shootout in Mumbai. He was acquitted after spending several months in jail.

=== Corruption allegations ===
In his Lok Sabha 2019 affidavit, Singh declared his total liabilities and assets amounting to around ₹11 crore. Nevertheless, he reportedly owns two helicopters, one private jet, as well as a number of schools, colleges, hotels, and hospitals.

=== Admitting to committing murder ===
In a video interview with the web portal The Lallantop in 2022, Brij Bhushan stated, "I have committed a murder in the past. Whatever people may say, I did commit a murder. I immediately shot and killed the person who had shot Ravinder dead". Ravinder Singh was his close friend.

=== As president of WFI ===
After he became the president of the Wrestling Federation of India (WFI), in an interview with The Indian Express, he said, "They [wrestlers] are strong boys and girls. You need someone strong to control them. Is there anyone stronger than me here?"

In 2021, during a Junior Wrestling Tournament, he was caught on camera slapping a wrestler on stage.

=== Allegations of sexually assaulting female wrestlers ===
In January 2023, a group of Olympians and international wrestlers including Vinesh Phogat, Sakshi Malik, Bajrang Punia, and others organised a sit-in demanding disbanding of the federation due to alleged sexual harassment of female wrestlers by Brij Bhushan. The protests resumed in April 2023 due to government inaction. The protestors demanded that police file an FIR against Brij Bhushan and called for his immediate arrest. The incidents of sexual harassment cited by protestors ranged from 2012 to 2022.

On 28 April 2023, after the intervention of the Supreme Court, the Delhi Police registered two FIRs against him. One of the FIRs was registered under the POCSO Act (The Protection of Children from Sexual Offences Act, 2012) for offences against a minor. A second FIR was registered on similar grounds on the complaint of the remaining six adult female wrestlers.

According to a report by the Indian Express, two female wrestler complainants described the way Brij Bhushan used to touch their breasts and stomach sexually on the pretext of checking their breath, in a police complaint on 21 April 2023. One of these women alleged that Brij Bhushan lifted her training jersey without her consent in 2018.

On 12 May, the Delhi Police recorded a statement from Brij Bhushan Sharan Singh regarding the sexual harassment charges levelled against him by female wrestlers and stated that a female DCP would head a SIT (Special Investigation Team) of 10 people against him.

The FIRs in the case mentioned allegations against Singh and WFI secretary Vinod Tomar. The allegations included demanding sexual favours for professional assistance in at least two cases, at least 15 incidents of sexual harassment which include inappropriate touching by running hands over breasts, touching the navel, several instances of intimidation including stalking, and a shared sense of fear and trauma. The incidents range from years 2012 to 2022 at different places at restaurant, in the WFI office, at tournaments and at a warm-up. Incidents occurred during domestic as well as international tournaments abroad. Vinesh Phogat, who has won multiple medals at the World Wrestling Championships, claimed she was "mentally harassed, tortured and threatened to be killed" by Singh for complaining against him to Prime Minister Narendra Modi and then sports minister Anurag Thakur.

On 27 May 2025, Singh was cleared in one count of sexual harassment against a minor wrestler by a court in Delhi.

In May 2024, the Rouse Avenue Court ordered the framing of charges against Singh in the sexual harassment allegations levelled by the six women wrestlers. The court had also stated that there was sufficient evidence on record to do so, paving the way for the beginning of the trial against him. Singh was acquitted by the court alongside co-accused Vinod Tomar in the sexual harassment case filed by the women wrestlers on 3 August 2026.

== See also ==
- Wrestling Federation of India
- 2023 Indian wrestlers' protest
