= Rana Vir Singh =

Indian politician (born 1932)

Member of Parliament, Lok Sabha
- In office 1980–1989
- Preceded by: Rudrasen Chaudhary
- Succeeded by: Rudrasen Chaudhary
- Constituency: Kaiserganj, Uttar Pradesh

Personal details
- Born: 8 September 1932 Banaras, United Provinces, British India, (present-day Varanasi, Uttar Pradesh, India)
- Party: Indian National Congress
- Spouse: Swadesh Rana

Rana Vir Singh (born 8 September 1932) is an Indian politician. He was elected to the Lok Sabha, the lower house of the Parliament of India as a member of the Indian National Congress.
