= Beni Prasad Verma =

Founding member of Samajwadi Party

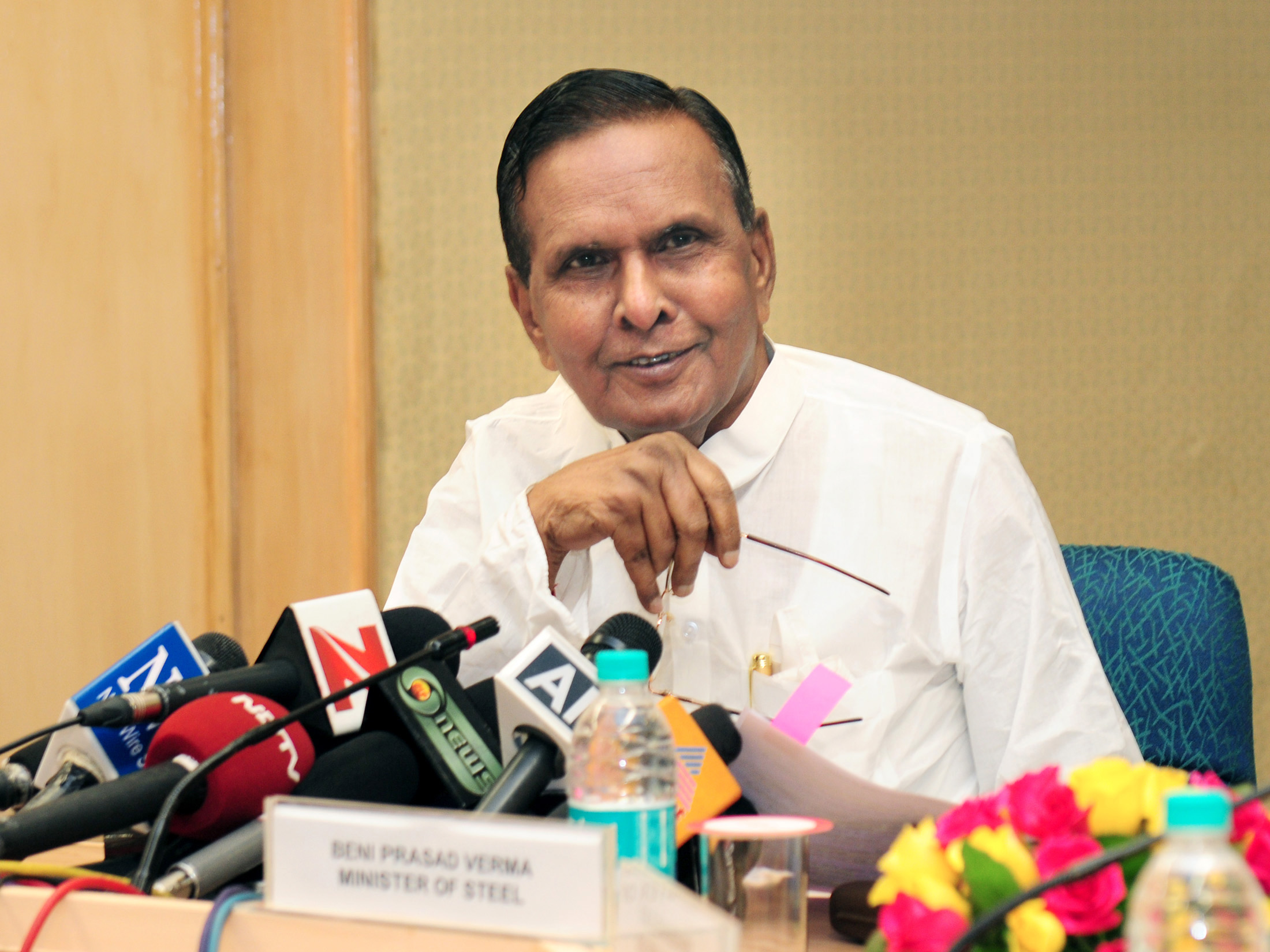

Member of Parliament, Rajya Sabha
- In office 5 July 2016 – 27 March 2020
- Preceded by: Jugul Kishore
- Succeeded by: Jai Prakash Nishad
- Constituency: Uttar Pradesh

Union Cabinet Minister Government of India
- In office 19 January 2011 – 26 May 2014
- Prime Minister: Manmohan Singh
- Ministry& Department's: Ministry of Steel(MoS, I/C until 12 July 2011)
- Preceded by: Virbhadra Singh
- Succeeded by: Narendra Singh Tomar
- In office 29 June 1996 – 19 March 1998
- Prime Minister: H. D. Deve Gowda; Inder Kumar Gujral
- Ministry& Department's: Ministry of Communications(MoS, I/C until 10 July 1996)
- Preceded by: H. D. Deve Gowda
- Succeeded by: Buta Singh

Union Minister of State Government of India
- In office 1 June 1996 – 29 June 1996
- Prime Minister: H. D. Deve Gowda
- Minister: Ram Vilas Paswan
- Ministry& Department's: Ministry of Parliamentary Affairs
- Preceded by: S. S. Ahluwalia
- Succeeded by: Ummareddy Venkateswarlu

Member of Parliament, Lok Sabha
- In office 16 May 2009 – 16 May 2014
- Preceded by: Kirti Vardhan Singh
- Succeeded by: Kirti Vardhan Singh
- Constituency: Gonda
- In office 9 May 1996 – 16 May 2009
- Preceded by: Laxminarain Mani Tripathi
- Succeeded by: Brij Bhushan Sharan Singh
- Constituency: Kaiserganj

Cabinet Minister Government of Uttar Pradesh
- In office 5 December 1993 – 3 June 1995
- Chief Minister: Mulayam Singh Yadav
- Ministry& Department's: Parliamentary Affairs; Public Work's Department
- In office 5 December 1989 – 24 June 1991
- Chief Minister: Mulayam Singh Yadav
- Ministry& Department's: Parliamentary Affairs; Public Work's Department; Excise
- In office 28 February 1979 – 17 February 1980
- Chief Minister: Babu Banarasi Das
- Ministry& Department's: Sugar Cane Development; Jail's

Member of Uttar Pradesh Legislative Assembly
- In office 1985–1995
- Preceded by: Rizvanur Rahman
- Succeeded by: Fareed Mahfooz Kidwai
- Constituency: Masauli
- In office 1977–1980
- Preceded by: Mohsina Kidwai
- Succeeded by: Rizvanur Rahman
- Constituency: Masauli
- In office 1974–1977
- Preceded by: Girja Shankar
- Succeeded by: Asharfi Lal
- Constituency: Dariyabad

Personal details
- Born: 11 February 1941 Barabanki, United Provinces, British India
- Died: 27 March 2020 (aged 79) Lucknow, Uttar Pradesh, India
- Party: Samajwadi Party
- Spouse: Malti Devi
- Children: 5

Beni Prasad Verma (11 February 1941 – 27 March 2020) was an Indian politician and a founding member of the Samajwadi Party. A prominent member of the Samajwadi Party, he later joined Indian National Congress and was elected on its ticket to Lok Sabha in 2009. In 2016 he rejoined the Samajwadi Party.

== Personal life ==
Verma was born in Barabanki, Uttar Pradesh into a Kurmi family. He had three sons and two daughters.

== Political career ==
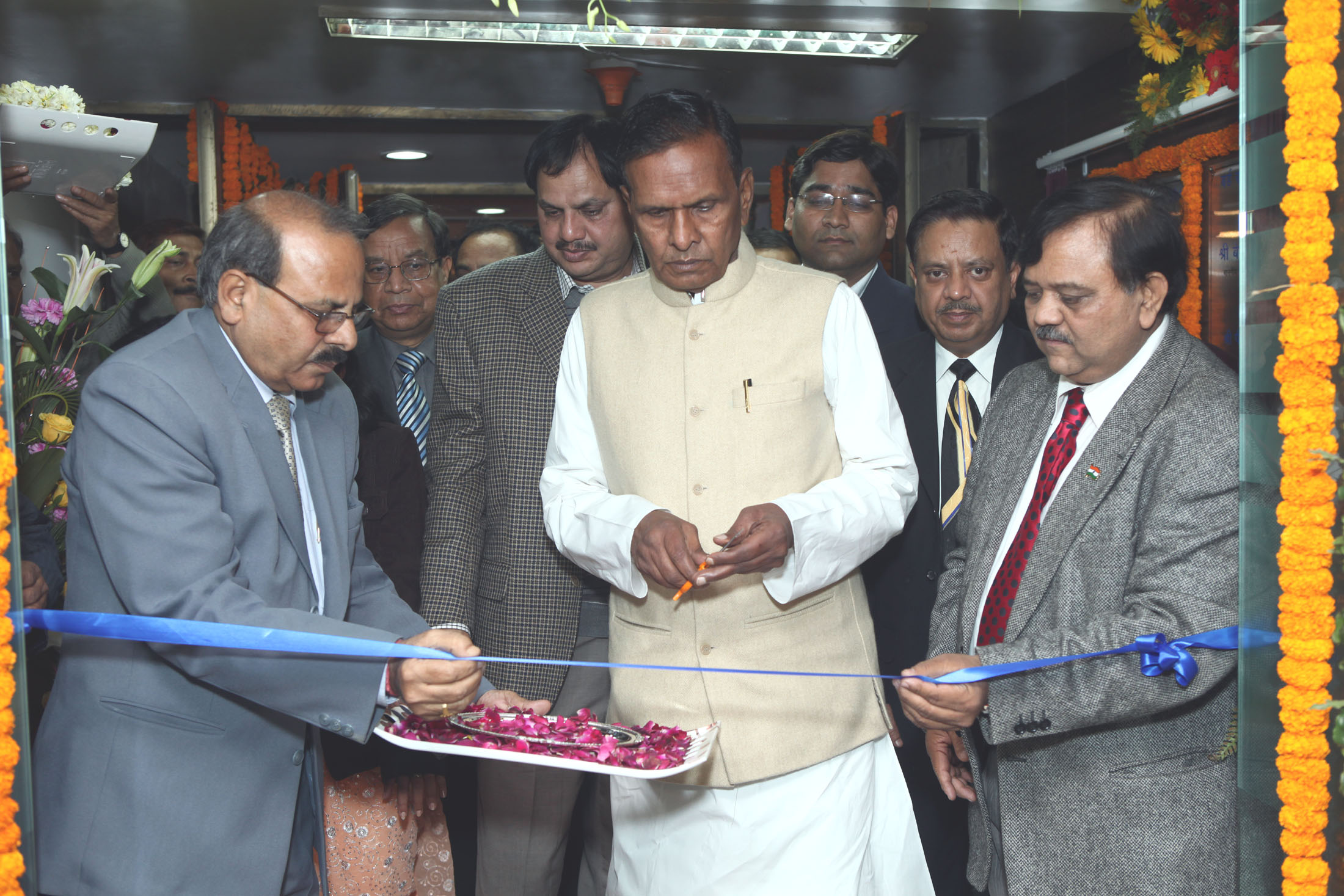
The Minister of State (Independent Charge) for Steel, Shri Beni Prasad Verma inaugurated the NCR Corporate Centre of Hindustan Steelworks Construction Limited, in New Delhi on 3 March 2011.

Beni Prasad Verma was the steel Minister of the Indian Government. He was the Public Works Department minister for the State of Uttar Pradesh in India for several years.

He served as the Union Communications Minister in Deve Gowda's cabinet from 1996 to 1998.

He was re-elected to the Lok Sabha in 1998, 1999 and 2004 from Kaiserganj constituency seat. In 2009, he was re-elected to the Lok Sabha from Gonda constituency in Uttar Pradesh state as an Indian National Congress candidate and on July-12-2011 was appointed the Steel Minister in Manmohan Singh Government. In 2016, he rejoined the Samajwadi Party.

== Educational institutes ==
Beni Prasad Verma has established educational institutions Chaudhary Charan Singh Mahavidyalaya at Bardari near Badosarai and Mohanlal Verma Educational Institute in his home district of Barabanki.

== Death ==
Verma died on 27 March 2020. Political leaders including Narendra Modi, Keshav Prasad Maurya, Akhilesh Yadav and others shared condolences.

== Views ==
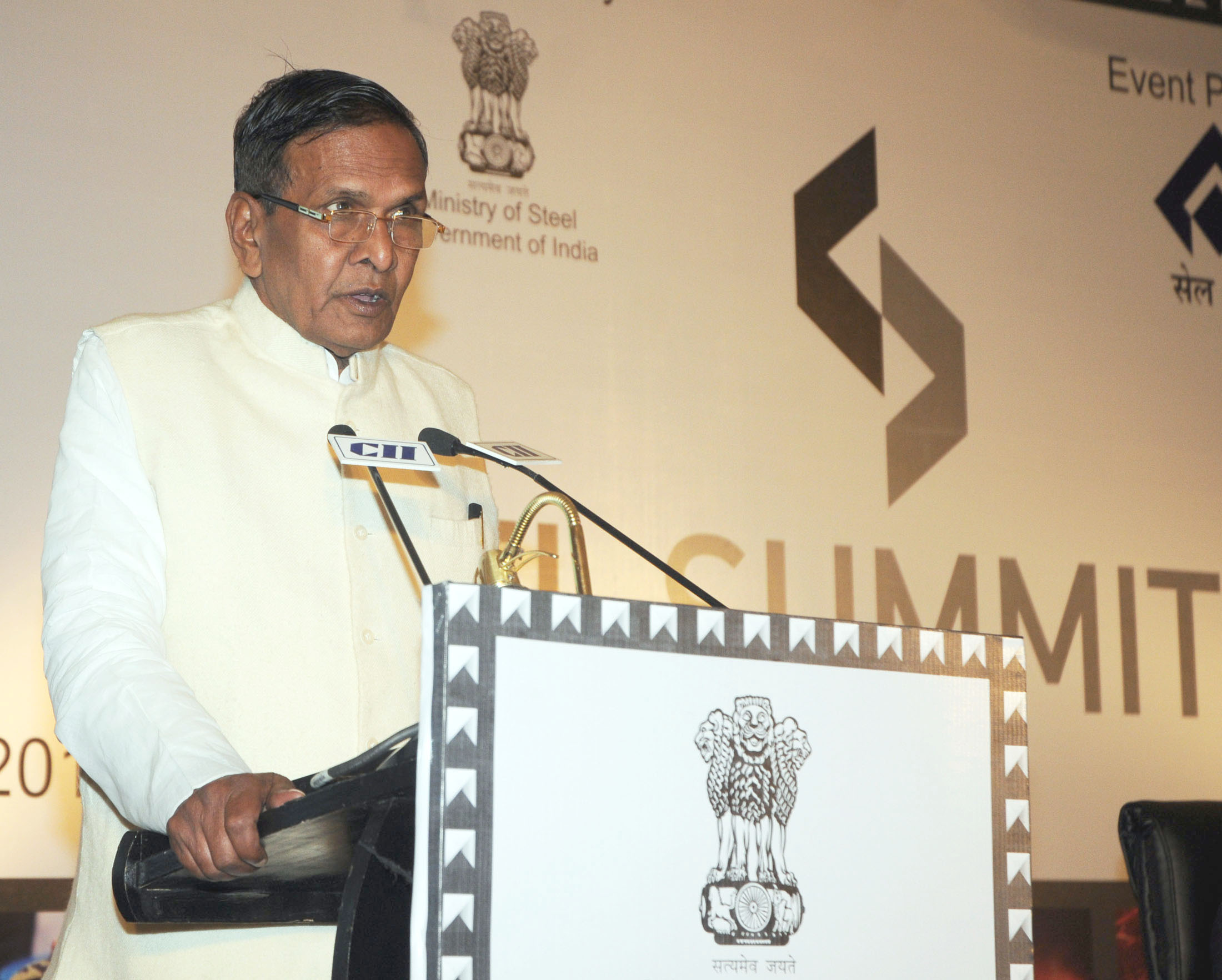
The Minister of State (Independent Charge) for Steel, Shri Beni Prasad Verma addressing at the inauguration of the Steel Summit-2011, in New Delhi on 25 February 2011.

In 1997, Beni Prasad Verma criticized B. R. Ambedkar in a Lucknow rally by saying "Ambedkar did nothing else except create trouble for Gandhiji."

In December 2009 during a debate session in Lok Sabha, Beni Prasad had remarked former Prime Minister Atal Bihari Vajpayee as "man of low standard". In the same statement, Verma had also criticized L. K. Advani. This created serious agitation among BJP leaders protested immediately by shouting, they stalled parliament and demanded an apology and said it would boycott the Lok Sabha till Verma apologises. Verma refused to apologise for the statement.

In February 2012, during the Uttar Pradesh elections Verma dared EC to arrest him, saying quota for Muslims will be hiked. Verma said this while addressing a rally at Kaimganj in the presence of Congress general secretary Digvijay Singh and Union law and minority affairs minister Salman Khurshid. Earlier, Khurshid created a controversy by stating that he would continue to speak on nine percent sub-quota for Muslims even if the Election Commission says it's against the guideline to promise such a thing during the elections.

On 19 August 2012 he made a remark in Barabanki, Uttar Pradesh that "With the increasing price levels, the farmers are benefitting. Dal, atta, vegetables have all become expensive. I am happy with this price rise. The more the prices rise the better it is for farmers," the minister said .

On 15 October 2012, he made a controversial remark that "I believe Salman Khurshid could not have embezzled Rs 71 lakh. It is a very small amount for a central minister. I would have taken it seriously if the amount was Rs 71 crore." The Times of India said his statements are grossly ill-timed and ill-phrased.

On 13 December 2012, he opposed hanging of Afzal Guru. He said: "Do not hang Afzal Guru but give him life imprisonment".

In December 2013, when he asked about Kumar Vishwas standing against Rahul Gandhi in the election from Rahul Gandhi's home place Amethi he said, "what will he fight, how will he fight. He is nothing but a joker. There are so many jokers already, he can join them."

In 2014, he criticised the then PM candidate Narendra Modi by saying "We need a future prime minister, not a man-eater". An FIR was filed against Verma for this statement.

In 2016, he blamed Rashtriya Swayamsevak Sangh (RSS) for assassination of Mahatma Gandhi and added that "When Mahatma Gandhi was assassinated, RSS workers were told in advance to keep their radio sets on for they will get to hear good news."

Political offices
Preceded by Virbhadra Singh	Minister of Steel; 19 Jan 2011 – 26 May 2014	Succeeded by Narendra Singh Tomar
