= Kirti Vardhan Singh =

Indian politician (born 1966)

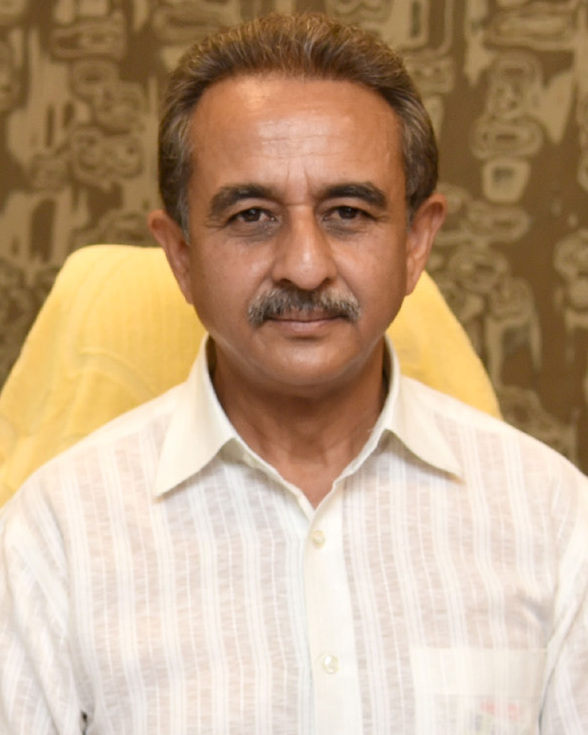
- Singh in 2024

Union Minister of State for External Affairs
- Incumbent
- Assumed office 9 June 2024 Serving with Pabitra Margherita
- Prime Minister: Narendra Modi
- Minister: S. Jaishankar
- Preceded by: V. Muraleedharan

Union Minister of State for Environment, Forest and Climate Change
- Incumbent
- Assumed office 9 June 2024
- Prime Minister: Narendra Modi
- Minister: Bhupender Yadav
- Preceded by: Ashwini Kumar Choubey

Member of Parliament, Lok Sabha
- Incumbent
- Assumed office 16 May 2014
- Preceded by: Beni Prasad Verma
- Constituency: Gonda, Uttar Pradesh
- In office 22 May 2004 – 17 May 2009
- Preceded by: Brij Bhushan Sharan Singh
- Succeeded by: Beni Prasad Verma
- Constituency: Gonda, Uttar Pradesh
- In office 13 March 1998 – 6 October 1999
- Preceded by: Ketki Devi Singh
- Succeeded by: Brij Bhushan Sharan Singh
- Constituency: Gonda, Uttar Pradesh

Personal details
- Born: 1 March 1966 (age 60) Lucknow, Uttar Pradesh, India
- Party: Bhartiya Janata Party (since 2014)
- Other political affiliations: Samajwadi Party (1998–2009, 2012–2014); Bahujan Samaj Party (2009–2012)
- Spouse: Kunwarani Madhushree Singh (m. 2002)
- Children: 1
- Parent(s): Raja Anand Singh (father) and Rani Veena Singh (mother)
- Education: University of Lucknow
- Occupation: Politician; environmental activist
- Nickname: Raja Bhaiya
- Pretender information
- Title(s): Raja
- Throne(s) claimed: Mankapur
- Pretend from: 2025–present
- Monarchy abolished: Sovereign Monarchy; 1947 (Instrument of Accession); Titular Monarchy; 1971 (26th Amendment of the Indian Constitution)
- Last monarch: Raja Raghvendra Pratap Singh
- As of 17 September, 2006

Raja Kirti Vardhan Singh (born 1 March 1966) is an Indian politician from Uttar Pradesh. He is currently serving as a Minister of State for External Affairs in the Third Modi Government and Member of Parliament, Lok Sabha for the Gonda constituency for 5th time. He is locally known by the alias Raja Bhaiya, being connected with erstwhile Taluqdari of Mankapur.

== Political career ==
He was a member of the 12th and 14th Lok Sabha from Gonda, Uttar Pradesh as a Samajwadi Party candidate. In March 2014, he resigned from the SP and joined Bharatiya Janata Party and contested the 2014 Lok Sabha elections, again from Gonda, where he was elected in the 16th and 17th Lok Sabhas. Singh is known to be an environmental activist. In July 2018, he won a case against the State Government of Uttar Pradesh in the Green Tribunal, a case pertaining to illegal sand mining by gangs in his constituency.

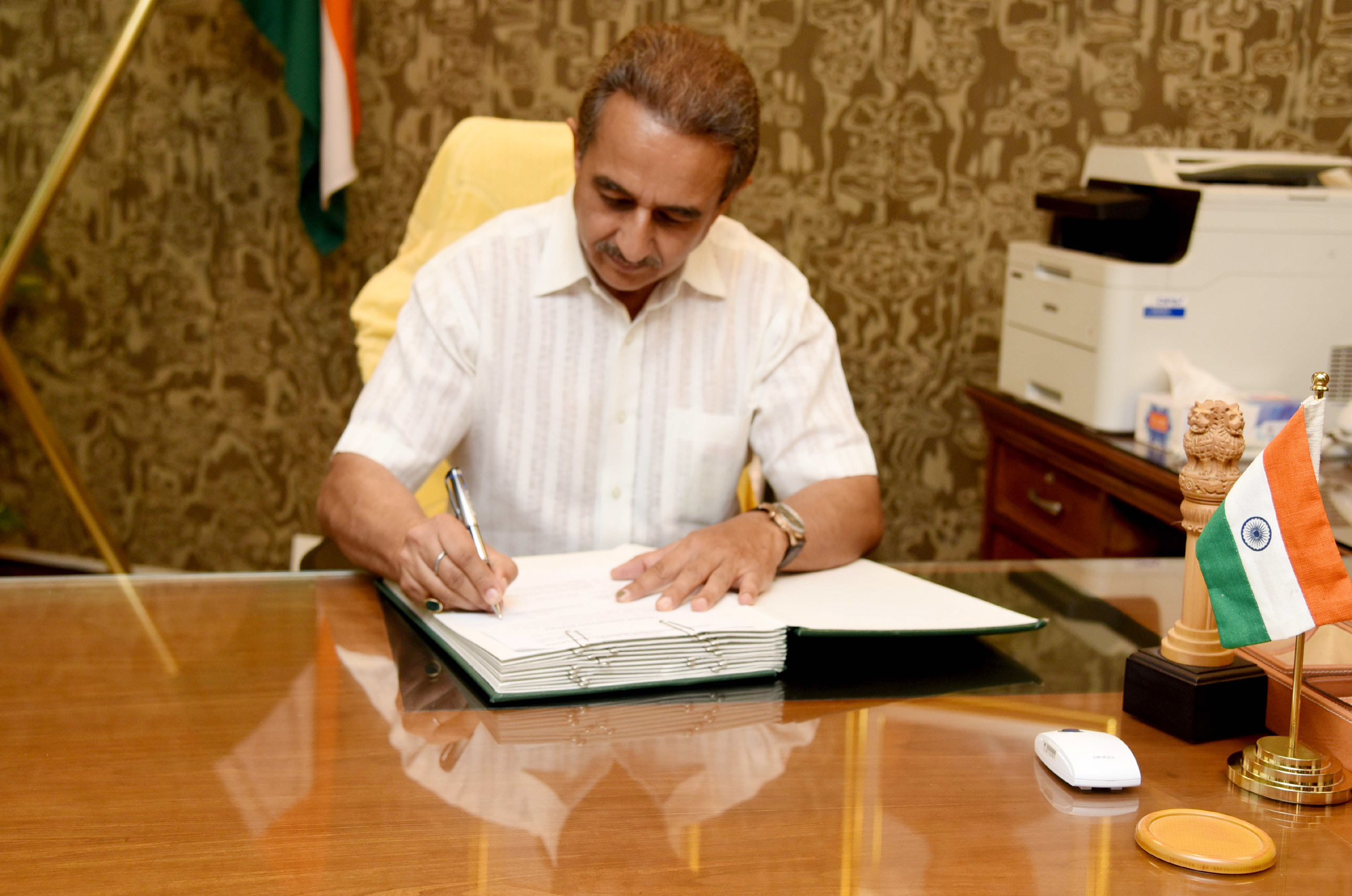
Singh assuming charge as the Minister of State for Environment, Forest and Climate Change.

In 2024, he was re-elected as the Member of Parliament from Gonda in the pivotal 18th Lok Sabha elections, from a BJP ticket. He is one of the 33 BJP MPs in Uttar Pradesh, in the difficult election period. He defeated the INDIA candidate Shreya Verma (SP) with a margin of 46222 Votes. Later that month, he took part in the oath ceremony as a Minister of State in the council of ministers. He has been made a junior minister in the Ministry of Environment and Forests and the Ministry of External Affairs.

In 2023, he gained attention for his involvement in a historic event on 8 April 2023. Singh piloted a powered hang glider above Pinjore Airport in Haryana, with veteran skydiver Shital Mahajan performing a jump as part of the inauguration of the National Aero Modelling Fellowship Program by the Aero Club of India. This event marked the first instance of a civilian jumping from a powered hang glider piloted by an active MP. The event, organized by the Aero Club of India representing the Federation of Aeronautical Internationale in India, received praise for its historic significance and potential for national recognition by the FAI.

== Early life and education ==
He was born on 1 March 1966 to Raja Anand Singh and Veena Singh of Mankapur Taluquadari.

He pursued higher education in the field of Geology and successfully obtained a Master of Science (M.Sc.) degree from the Lucknow University, where he specialised in geological sciences.

On 16 November 2002, Kirti Vardhan Singh married Madhushree Singh. The couple has a son, Kunwar Jai Vardhan Singh, who was born on 10 November 2006. As a family, they are involved in various social and cultural activities.

== See also ==
- Third Modi ministry
