= Mohan Pass =

Coordinates: 30°14′18″N 77°57′47″E

Mohan Pass is a principal pass in the Sivalik Hills, the southernmost and geologically youngest foothills running parallel to the main Himalayas. The main road from Saharanpur in Uttar Pradesh to Dehra Dun and the hill station of Mussoorie in Uttarakhand cuts through the pass, then crosses the foothills.
