= Ram Pratap Verma =

Indian politician

Member of the Uttar Pradesh Legislative Assembly
- Incumbent
- Assumed office March 2022
- Preceded by: Arif Anwar Hashmi
- Constituency: Utraula

Member of the Uttar Pradesh Legislative Assembly
- In office March 2017 – 2022
- Constituency: Utraula

Personal details
- Born: 7 August 1983 (age 43) Balrampur, Uttar Pradesh, India
- Party: Bharatiya Janata Party
- Spouse: Sunita Verma (m. 2003)
- Education: Maharani Lal Kunwari P. G. College
- Profession: Politician

Ram Pratap Verma (born 7 August 1983), also known as Shashikant Verma, is an Indian politician and a member of Legislative Assembly, Uttar Pradesh of India. He represents the Utraula constituency in Balrampur district of Uttar Pradesh. Ram Pratap Verma is Bhartiya Janta Party MLA from Utraula assembly of district Balrampur for the second consecutive time. He is the son of Shyamlal Verma, ex MLA Utraula (2007-2012).

== Early life and education ==
Verma was born in a Kurmi family of Uttar Pradesh and he completed his primary education from Saraswati Shishu Mandir, Utraula and post graduate education from Maharani Lal Kunwari Mahavidyalaya.

Rampratap Verma is the director of SRTC group of Colleges and also operates many other businesses.

== Political career ==
Joining the Rashtriya Swayamsevak Sangh during his education from the Shishu Mandir in his childhood, he continued to participate in the work of the Sangh perpetually. After taking the inspiration of politics from his father, from 2006 to 2011, he was the unopposed village head of his village Imalia Vanghusra. Thereafter, entering into politics, in the year 2013 to 2016, he was the District Vice President of Bharatiya Janata Party District Balrampur and from 2016 to 2017, he was the District General Secretary.

In the year 2017, he was elected MLA by contesting the Vidhansabha elections from Utraula seat of Balrampur on Bharatiya Janata Party ticket with a huge margin.

His wife Mrs. Sunita Verma has been elected unopposed as village head of her village Imalia Vanghusara since 2011.

== See also ==
- Uttar Pradesh Legislative Assembly
- Utraula (Assembly constituency)
- Balrampur
- Bhartiya Janta Party
