= Kaiserganj Lok Sabha constituency =

Constituency of the Indian parliament in Uttar Pradesh

Coordinates: 27.25°N 81.55°E

Kaiserganj UP-57
- Lok Sabha constituency
- Interactive Map Outlining Kaiserganj Lok Sabha constituency

Constituency details
- Country: India
- Region: North India
- State: Uttar Pradesh
- Assembly constituencies: Payagpur; Kaiserganj; Katra Bazar; Colonelganj; Tarabganj
- Established: 1952
- Reservation: None

Member of Parliament
- 18th Lok Sabha
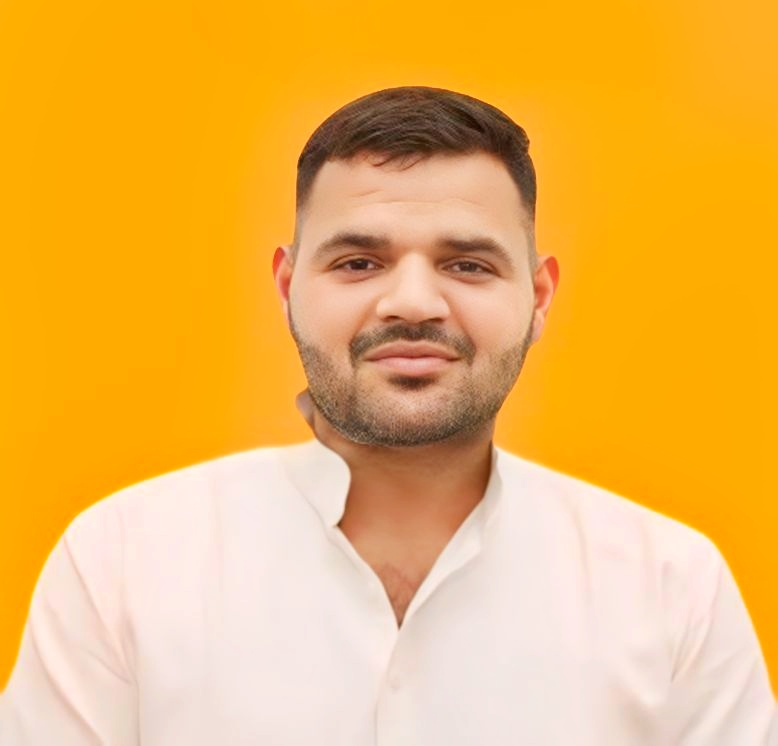
- Incumbent Karan Bhushan Singh
- Party: Bharatiya Janata Party
- Elected year: 2024

Kaiserganj Lok Sabha constituency is one of the 80 Lok Sabha (parliamentary) constituencies in Uttar Pradesh state in northern India.

== Assembly segments ==
Presently, after delimitation, Kaiserganj Lok Sabha constituency comprises the following five Vidhan Sabha segments:

No	Name	District	Member	Party	2024 Lead
287	Payagpur	Bahraich	Subhash Tripathi	BJP	BJP
288	Kaiserganj	Bahraich	Anand Kumar Yadav	SP	SP
297	Katra Bazar	Gonda	Bawan Singh	BJP	BJP
298	Colonelganj	Gonda	Ajay Kumar Singh	BJP	BJP
299	Tarabganj	Gonda	Prem Narayan Pandey	BJP	BJP

== Members of Parliament ==
Year	Member	Party
1952	Shakuntala Nayar (Note: named Gonda District seat in 1952)	Hindu Mahasabha
1957	Bhagwandin Misra	Indian National Congress
1962	Basant Kunwari	Swatantra Party
1967	Shakuntala Nayar	Bharatiya Jana Sangh
1971	Shakuntala Nayar	Bharatiya Jana Sangh
1977	Rudra Sen Chaudhary	Janata Party
1980	Rana Vir Singh	Indian National Congress
1984	Rana Vir Singh	Indian National Congress
1989	Rudra Sen Chaudhary	Bharatiya Janata Party
1991	Laxminarain Mani Tripathi	Bharatiya Janata Party
1996	Beni Prasad Verma	Samajwadi Party
1998	Beni Prasad Verma	Samajwadi Party
1999	Beni Prasad Verma	Samajwadi Party
2004	Beni Prasad Verma	Samajwadi Party
2009	Brij Bhushan Sharan Singh	Samajwadi Party
2014	Brij Bhushan Sharan Singh	Bharatiya Janata Party
2019	Brij Bhushan Sharan Singh	Bharatiya Janata Party
2024	Karan Bhushan Singh	Bharatiya Janata Party

== Election results ==
=== 2024 ===
General Election, 2024: Kaiserganj
Party	Candidate	Votes	%	±%
BJP	Karan Bhushan Singh	571,263	53.79	▼5.45
SP	Ram Bhagat Mishra	4,22,420	39.77	▲39.77
BSP	Narendra Pandey	44,279	4.17	▼28.41
NOTA	None of the Above	14,887	1.40	▲0.06
Independent	Arunima Pandey	9,250	0.87	N/A
Majority		1,48,843	14.01	▼12.65
Turnout		10,62,099	55.76	▲1.37
BJP hold		Swing		

=== 2019 ===
2019 Indian general elections: Kaiserganj
Party	Candidate	Votes	%	±%
BJP	Brij Bhushan Sharan Singh	581,358	59.24	
BSP	Chandradev Ram Yadav	3,19,757	32.58	
INC	Vinay Kumar Pandey	37,132	3.78	
PSP(L)	Dhananjay Sharma	2,001	0.20	
NOTA	None of the Above	13,168	1.34	
Majority		2,61,601	26.66	
Turnout		9,82,323	54.39	
BJP hold		Swing		

=== 2014 ===
2014 Indian general elections: Kaiserganj
Party	Candidate	Votes	%	±%
BJP	Brij Bhushan Sharan Singh	381,500	40.44	
SP	Vinod Kumar Singh (Pandit Singh)	3,03,282	32.15	
BSP	Krishna Kumar Ojha	1,46,726	15.55	
INC	Mukesh Srivastava	57,401	6.08	
IND	Rampher	11,366	1.20	
NOTA	None of the Above	11,853	1.26	
Majority		78,218	8.29	
Turnout		9,43,437	55.11	
BJP gain from SP		Swing		

=== 2009 ===
2009 Indian general elections: Kaiserganj
Party	Candidate	Votes	%	±%
SP	Brij Bhushan Sharan Singh	196,063	34.66	
BSP	Surendra Nath Awasthi	1,23,864	21.89	
BJP	Lalta Prasad Mishra	1,20,561	21.31	
INC	Mohd Aleem	73,140	12.93	
IND	Jagdish Prasad	7,408	1.30	
PECP	Ramender Dev Pathak	6,272	1.10	
Majority		72,199	12.77	
Turnout		5,65,641	41.01	
SP hold		Swing		

== Demographics ==
According to an The Indian Express article in 2024 Kaiserganj constituency has a population of about 28% Brahmins, 18% Thakurs, 15% Muslims, 8% Yadavs , 10% Dalits, 5% kurmi . approx 5.5 lakhs Brahmins ,3.5 lakhs Thakur ,3 lakhs Muslim,1.5 lakhs Yadav,1 lakh Kurmi, 2 lakh Dalit.

== See also ==
- Bahraich district
- List of constituencies of the Lok Sabha
