= Prem Narayan Pandey =

Member of the Uttar Pradesh Legislative Assembly

Member of Uttar Pradesh Legislative Assembly
- Incumbent
- Assumed office 11 March 2017
- Preceded by: Awadhesh Kumar Singh
- Constituency: Tarabganj

Personal details
- Born: 2 October 1957 (age 68) Ranipur, Tarabganj; Gonda, Uttar Pradesh
- Party: Bharatiya Janata Party
- Profession: Politician

Prem Narayan Pandey is an Indian politician and a member of the 18th Uttar Pradesh Assembly from the Tarabganj Assembly constituency of Gonda district. He is a member of the Bharatiya Janata Party.

== Early life ==
Prem Narayan Pandey was born on 2 October 1957 in Ranipur, Uttar Pradesh, to a Hindu family of Indrapal Pandey. He married Vimla Devi, and they had four children.

== Posts held ==
#	From	To	Position	Ref
01	March 2017	March 2022	Member, 17th Uttar Pradesh Assembly	
02	March 2022	Incumbent	Member, 18th Uttar Pradesh Assembly	

== See also ==
- 18th Uttar Pradesh Assembly
- Tarabganj Assembly constituency
- Uttar Pradesh Legislative Assembly
