= Gonda Assembly constituency =

Constituency of the Uttar Pradesh legislative assembly in India

Coordinates: 27.14°N 81.96°E

Gonda
- Constituency No. 296 for the Uttar Pradesh Legislative Assembly
- Map Outlining Gonda Assembly constituency

Constituency details
- Country: India
- Region: North India
- State: Uttar Pradesh
- District: Gonda
- Total electors: 3,47,946
- Reservation: None

Member of Legislative Assembly
- 18th Uttar Pradesh Legislative Assembly
- Incumbent Prateek Bhushan Singh
- Party: BJP
- Elected year: 2017

Gonda is a constituency of the Uttar Pradesh Legislative Assembly covering the city of Gonda in the Gonda district of Uttar Pradesh, India.

Gonda is one of seven assembly constituencies in the Gonda district. This assembly constituency is numbered 296 amongst 403 constituencies.

== Members of the Legislative Assembly ==
Year	Member	Party
1967	Iswar Saran	Indian National Congress
1969	Triveni Sahai	Bharatiya Jana Sangh
1974	Triveni Sahai	Bharatiya Jana Sangh
1977	Fazlul Bari alias Banne	Janata Party
1980	Raghuraj Prasad Upadhyay	Indian National Congress (I)
1985	Raghuraj Prasad Upadhyay	Indian National Congress
1989	Raghuraj Prasad Upadhyay	Indian National Congress
1991	Tulsidas Rai Chandani	Bharatiya Janata Party
1993	Tulsidas Rai Chandani	Bharatiya Janata Party
1996	Vinod Kumar Singh alias Pandit Singh	Samajwadi Party
2002	Vinod Kumar Singh alias Pandit Singh	Samajwadi Party
2007	Mohammad Jalil Khan	Bahujan Samaj Party
2012	Vinod Kumar Singh alias Pandit Singh	Samajwadi Party
2017	Prateek Bhushan Singh	Bharatiya Janata Party
2022	Prateek Bhushan Singh	Bharatiya Janata Party

== Election results ==
=== 2027 ===
2027 Uttar Pradesh Legislative Assembly election: Gond
Party	Candidate	Votes	%	±%
INDIA				
NDA				
BSP				
NOTA	None of the above			
Majority				
Turnout				
gain from		Swing		

=== 2022 ===
2022 Uttar Pradesh Legislative Assembly election: Gonda
Party	Candidate	Votes	%	±%
BJP	Prateek Bhushan Singh	96,528	48.21	+18.11
SP	Suraj Singh	89,829	44.87	+23.44
BSP	Mohd Zaki	5,758	2.88	−21.18
INC	Rama Kashyap	2,701	1.35	
NOTA	None of the above	989	0.49	−0.34
Majority		6,699	3.34	−2.7
Turnout		200,215	57.54	+1.0
BJP hold		Swing		

=== 2017 ===
Bharatiya Janta Party candidate Prateek Bhushan Singh won in 2017 Uttar Pradesh Legislative Elections defeating Bahujan Samaj Party candidate Mohd. Jaleel Khan by a margin of 11,678 votes.

2017 Uttar Pradesh Legislative Assembly election: Gonda
Party	Candidate	Votes	%	±%
BJP	Prateek Bhushan Singh	58,254	30.1	
BSP	Mohammad Jalil Khan	46,576	24.06	
SP	Suraj Singh	41,477	21.43	
SS	Mahesh Narayan Tiwari	35,606	18.4	
NOTA	None of the above	1,594	0.83	
Majority		11,678	6.04	
Turnout		193,555	56.54	
BJP gain from SP		Swing		

=== 2012 ===
2012 Uttar Pradesh Legislative Assembly election: Gonda
Party	Candidate	Votes	%	±%
SP	Vinod Kumar Singh alias Pandit Singh	62,058	37.2	
BJP	Mahesh Narayan Tiwari	47,203	28.3	
Independent	Mohammad Jalil Khan	23,974	14.4	
BSP	Mohd Sagheer Usmani	19,590	11.7	
INC	Raghuraj Prasad Upadhyay	4,332	2.6	
Majority		14,855	8.9	
Turnout		1,66,059	55.8	
SP gain from BSP		Swing		
