= Wrestling Federation of India =

Sport governing body

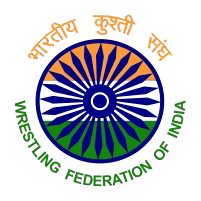
- Sport: Wrestling
- Jurisdiction: India
- Membership: 28
- Abbreviation: WFI
- Founded: 27 January 1967; 59 years ago
- Affiliation: United World Wrestling
- Regional affiliation: Asia-Pacific Federation of Wrestling
- Headquarters: New Delhi, India
- President: Sanjay Singh
- Secretary: V.N. Prasood

Official website
- wrestlingfederationofindia.com
- (India)

The Wrestling Federation of India is the premier governing body of wrestling in India. It is headquartered in New Delhi. WFI is affiliated to the United World Wrestling. which makes it the internationally recognized wrestling regulation body of India. Currently headed by Sanjay Singh, The key role of the body is to organize the training and support of wrestlers across India for both domestic as well as international wrestling events. It also regulates wrestling in India as all other state-level wrestling federations across the country fall under its jurisdiction.

WFI is also a member of the Indian Olympic Association.

== Background ==
The WFI was constituted on 27 January 1967. Since its inception, it has supported and promoted Indian wrestling at all international sports events including Asian Games, Commonwealth Games, and Olympics.

In 2015 it started the Pro Wrestling League tournament to popularize wrestling across the country, which currently includes six wrestling franchises representing the cities and states of Delhi, Mumbai, Haryana, Uttar Pradesh, Punjab, and Madhya Pradesh. Each team consisted of 11 players, and many international medalists of wrestling also competed in the league, including Vladimer Khinchengashivli, Helen Maroulis, and Soslan Ramonov.

The federation is also known for organizing annual national championships for Senior and Junior levels in wrestling.

== Structure ==
WFI is governed by a 15-member Executive Committee that is elected by the representatives of each state's wrestling federation. The committee consists of a President, a Senior Vice President, 4 Vice Presidents, a Secretary General, a Treasurer, 2 Joint Secretaries and 5 executive members. All these members are elected by the representatives of WFI-recognized state wrestling federations. Elections to these posts of the committee are organized every four years, and a candidate can stand only twice.

The elected Executive Committee is then required to organize the day-to-day functions of WFI inline with its constitution. There's also a 7-member Athletes commission to resolve the grievances of athletes before the executive body. This commission is also elected, and the electors are athletes themselves.

=== Affiliated associations ===
The WFI has a total of 28 affiliated units or associations, each representing a different state. These include:

1. Andhra Pradesh Amateur Wrestling Association
2. Bihar Wrestling Association
3. Chandigarh Union Territory Wrestling Association
4. Chandigarh Wrestling Association
5. Delhi Amateur Wrestling Association
6. Progressive Wrestling Association of Goa
7. Gujarat State Wrestling Association
8. Haryana Wrestling Association
9. Himachal Pradesh Wrestling Association
10. Jammu and Kashmir Wrestling Association
11. Jharkhand Wrestling Association
12. Karnataka Wrestling Association
13. Kerala State Wrestling Association
14. Madhya Pradesh Amateur Wrestling Association
15. Maharastra State Wrestling Association
16. Manipur Wrestling Association
17. Mizoram Wrestling Association
18. Nagaland Wrestling Association
19. Odisha Wrestling Association
20. Punjab Wrestling Association
21. Postal Sports Board
22. Railway Sports Promotion Board
23. Rajasthan Wrestling Association
24. Services Sports Control Board
25. Tamil Nadu Amateur Wrestling Association
26. Telangana State Amateur Wrestling Association
27. Uttar Pradesh Wrestling Association
28. Wrestling Association of Uttarakhand
29. West Bengal Wrestling Association

== Controversies ==
=== Conflict over private coaches and physiotherapists (2021-2022) ===
Towards the end of January 2022, star wrestler Bajrang Punia went through a strain injury while training at the wrestling national camp in Sonipat. On 24 March 2022, Punia told reporters that he has been requesting the WFI, Sports Authority of India (SAI) and his sponsors (JSW) to provide him a personal physiotherapist for his rehab and recovery, but his requests have been denied due to which he is forced do the rehab on his own. WFI Assistant Secretary Vinod Tomar, in turn, said that they don't have any problem in giving a physio to Bajrang and have already approved the request, but the physio requested by him (Anand Kumar Dubey) is an employee of Indian Railways, which doesn't have a policy of relieving its employees for personal arrangements.

A day later, on 25 March 2022, WFI issued a formal statement rebuking Punia's claim. It said that after Indian Railways denied to relieve Mr. Anand Kumar for being attached with Bajrang Punia, the federation sent two other physios to SAI national camp in Sonipat, but Bajrang denied their services. This basically meant that physios would no longer be provided to athletes in personal capacity and they would be a part of the national camp only, where they would have to work on all wrestlers.

Before that, in August 2021 then WFI President Brij Bhushan asked wrestlers to provide the federation with hard copies of their contracts with private sponsors providing coaching and support. Next month, in September 2021, he publicly criticized the practice of hiring private coaches for high profile wrestlers. Speaking to press at Tokyo Olympics, he said that although wrestlers like Punia and Ravi Dahiya were competing with their private foreign coaches, he personally was against the practice. The coaches should be responsible for the entire team rather than any individual wrestler.

=== Sexual harassment allegations and protests (2023) ===
In January 2023 some of the most well-known Indian wrestlers, including Bajrang Punia, Sakshi Malik, Vinesh Phogat and Satyawart Kandian, accused WFI President and BJP MP Brij Bhushan Sharan Singh of sexual harassment of female wrestlers during his tenure. They started a sit-in protest at Jantar Mantar in New Delhi demanding Brij Bhushan's removal from his position of WFI President and his arrest. After months of protests, the Ministry of Youth Affairs and Sports ultimately suspended WFI executive body in May 2023 and asked IOA to constitute an ad-hoc panel to oversee the functioning of WFI.

Two first information reports (FIRs) were registered against Brij Bhushan after Supreme Court's intervention, one of which was under the POCSO Act for harassment of a minor wrestler. The minor wrestler subsequently dropped her complaint, leading to the removal of charges filed under POCSO.

The Indian government had instructed IOA's ad-hoc committee to hold elections for the Executive Body within 45 days of taking charge. However, the committee failed to meet this deadline, and as a result the UWW suspended WFI's affiliation in August 2023. This restricted the ability of WFI to promote and represent Indian wrestlers at international events, and the ability of Indian wrestlers to compete under the Indian flag in such events. The elections to WFI executive body were ultimately held in December 2023, and Sanjay Singh, a close aide of Brij Bhushan, sweeped them as his associates won 13 out of 15 seats in the executive body. This led to outrage and Indian government suspended the newly elected WFI executive body, once again putting IOA's ad-hoc committee in charge of the Indian wrestling.

In February 2024, the UWW lifted its suspension of the WFI after receiving written guarantees from the federation that no discriminatory action will be taken against the protesting wrestlers and the federation will reconstitute its Athletes commission by 1 July 2024. Subsequently, in March 2024 the IOA also suspended its ad-hoc committee that was overseeing the daily functions of WFI, putting Sanjay Singh completely in charge of the federation. Protesting wrestlers challenged it in Delhi High Court, and the court ordered on 16 August 2024 that until the Union government recalled its suspension order formally it's necessary for the ad-hoc committee of IOA to manage the affairs of WFI. WFI has challenged the court order and currently it's subjudice in front of a larger bench of Delhi High Court.

== Notable wrestlers ==
Some of the most notable wrestlers trained and supported by the federation include:

- Sushil Kumar
- Yogeshwar Dutt
- Narsingh Yadav
- Sakshi Malik
- Bajrang Punia
- Ravi Kumar Dahiya
- Amit Dhankhar
- Phogat sisters (Geeta, Babita, Priyanka, Ritu, Vinesh, and Sangeeta Phogat)
- Divya Kakran
- Aman Sehrawat
- Nisha Dahiya

== See also ==
- 2023 Indian wrestlers' protest
- Sports Authority of India
- Indian Olympic Association
- Athletics Federation of India
- Basketball Federation of India
- Badminton Association of India
- All India Football Federation
- Boxing Federation of India
- Hockey India
- Gymnastics Federation of India
- Cycling Federation of India
- Indian Weightlifting Federation
- Volleyball Federation of India
- Swimming Federation of India
- All India Tennis Association
- Table Tennis Federation of India
