= Sadullanagar =

Village in India

Sadulla Nagar SMT Village is a village in Uttar Pradesh, India. Utraula, Balrampur, Faizabad, Tulsipur are the nearby Cities to Sadullah Nagar. Sadullah Nagar Pin Code is 271307. Sadullah Nagar is a legislative assembly constituency in Uttar Pradesh. Since 2008, Sadullah Nagar Assembly constituency merged as Utraula Assembly Constituency. ISadullah Nagar comes under Gonda Lok Sabha constituency. Sadullah Nagar is saprated from Utraula by Kunwa River and by Bishui river from Mankapur. Sadullah Nagar people speak Hindi, Urdu as their main communication language. located 169 km from State capital Lucknow.

== Demographics ==
As of 2011 Indian Census, Sadullah Nagar Panchayat had a total population of 5,192, of which 2,643 were males and 2,549 were females. The Female Sex Ratio was of 799. Population within the age group of 0 to 6 years was 395.It is located 45 km towards South from District headquarters Balrampur. 167 km from State capital Lucknow. The latitude 27.0933716 and longitude 82.3804448999999 are the geocoordinate of the Sadullah Nagar.

== Transportation ==
Railway Station:

Maskanwa railway station	10.5 km.
Lakhpat Nagar railway station	12.5 km.
Mankapur Junction railway station	17.6 km.
Jhilahi railway station	20.7 km.
Babhnan railway station	20.9 km

Airport :

Ayodhya Airport	44.1 km.
Shravasti Airport	57.4 km.
Akbarpur (Ambedkar Nagar) Airstrip	74.3 km
Gorakhpur Airport	126 km.
Chaudhary Charan Singh Airport	171 km.

== Education ==
- A G Hashmi Inter College Sadullah Nagar
- Haji Ismail Inter College, Sadullah Nagar, Balrampur
- Amina Convent School
- KISHAN CONVENT SCHOOL
- Balika Inter College Rehra Bazar
- HPM Inter Collage Rehra Bazar, Balrampur
- KISAN BALIKA INTER Collage.
- P.S. Sadullah Nagar Primary School

== Banks ==
- HDFC Bank
- Punjab National Bank
- State Bank Of India
- Allahabad Bank CSC
- Bank of Baroda CSP
