= List of colleges affiliated with Maa Pateswari University =

Maa Pateswari University is a state university located in the Balrampur district of Uttar Pradesh, India. It was established in 2024 by the Government of Uttar Pradesh under the Uttar Pradesh State Universities Act, 1973, with the objective of providing higher education in the Devipatan Division, which includes the districts of Balrampur, Gonda, Bahraich, and Shravasti.

More than 171 private and government colleges are affiliated with the university.

== Colleges ==
1. A G Hashmi Degree College
2. Abhinav College of Teaching and Training, Kolhampur, Nawabganj, Gonda
3. Abul Kalam Azad Mahavidyalaya, Jamuniabag, Vishunga, Gonda
4. Acharya Narendra Deo Kisan P.G. College, Babhnan, Gonda
5. Alhai Mahavidyalaya, Umedjot, Kherhansa, Gonda
6. Alhai Shikshak Prashikshan Sansthan, Ummedjot, Khorasha, Gonda
7. Ameer Hasan Faruqi Masoodiya Mubarka Degree College, Imamganj Road, Nanpara
8. Aryavart Mahavidyalaya
9. Awadh Raji Mahila Mahavidyalaya, Deoria Jungli, Utraula
10. B P Mahavidyalaya, Narayanpur, Maskinwa, Gonda
11. Baba Budheshwar Nath Shikshan Prashikshan Mahavidyalaya, Rampur, Dhebiahar, Nanpara
12. Baba Gayadeen Vaidya Baburam Mahavidyalaya, Mainpur, Nawabganj, Gonda
13. Baba Shiv Saran Singh Bake Singh Educational Institute, Peri Pokhar, Mankapur, Gonda
14. Babu Basudev Singh Smarak Mahavidyalaya, Jaitapur, Bahraich
15. Babu Durga Prasad Mishra Mahavidyalaya, Bahiradeeha, Chhapiya, Gonda
16. Babu Sunder Singh Mahavidyalaya, Hujurpur, Bahraich
17. Baikunth Nath Vidhi Mahavidyalaya, Duttnagar, Hujurpur Road, Colonelganj, Gonda
18. Baikunthnath Mahavidyalay, Hujurpur Road, Karnailganj, Gonda
19. Balrampur City Montessori Girls Degree College, Balrampur
20. Banwari Devi Ashok Kumar Smarak Mahavidyalaya, Dhodhwa Kala, Sirsia, Shrawasti
21. Bappa Ji Mahila Mahavidyalay, Chafariya, Bahraich
22. Bhagirathi Singh Smarak Mahavidyalaya, Wazeerganj, Gonda
23. Bhagwan Prasad Sant Bakas Tiwari Vidhi Mahavidyalaya, Maskanwa, Gonda
24. Bhawani Prasad Mishr Jatashankar Sikshan Sewa Sansthan Mahavidyalaya
25. Brajlal Pandey Mahavidyalaya, Bairipur Ramnath, Mankapur, Gonda
26. Budhni Devi Smarak Mahila Mahavidyalaya
27. Chandra Shekhar Azad Mahavidyalaya, Mijhhoura, Paraspur, Gonda
28. Chandra Shekhar Shyam Raji Mahavidyalaya, Dhanepur, Gonda
29. Chaudhary Gaya Prasad Mahavidyalaya, Shivpur, Bahraich
30. Chaudhary Lalta Prasad Singh Baudh Mahavidyalaya, Sri Dutt Ganj, Balrampur
31. Chhangur Singh Mahavidyalaya, Umari, Beghumganj, Pure Suryavansh
32. Chhatrapati Shahuji Maharaj Mahavidyalaya, Jiloi, Gonda
33. D.P.S Institute, Chranghiya, Tulsipur
34. Dashrath Singh Smarak Mahavidyalaya, Nipania, Gaura Chauki, Gonda
35. Deep Narayan Singh Degree College
36. Devideen Singh Mahavidyalaya, Lolpur, Shivdayalganj, Gonda
37. Dr Gaurav Singh Memorial Girls Degree College, Chauri, Gonda
38. Dr Mamta College of Law, Kolhampur, Nawabganj
39. Dr Bheemrao Ambedkar Mahavidyalaya, Kaithola, Gonda
40. Eklavya Mahavidyalaya, Jhumia, Bahraich
41. Faisal Mahavidyalaya, Tulsipur, Balrampur
42. Fatima Degree College
43. Gaharwar Mahavidyalaya
44. Gayatri Vidyapeeth P.G. College, Risia, Bahraich
45. Gonard Educational Institute, Beerpur, Katra, Gonda
46. Gramin Bharat Mahila Mahavidyalaya
47. Guru Vashisth Mahavidyalaya, Mankapur, Gonda
48. Hakiullah Chaudhary Mahavidyalaya, Dhari Ghat, Gonda
49. Hazi Ismail Mahavidyalaya, Sadullahnagar, Balrampur
50. Hazi Newaz Ali Mahavidyalaya, Daulatpur Grant
51. Jagdamba Sharan Singh Educational Institute, Pure Fakeer, Tarabganj, Gonda
52. Jai Hanuman Mahavidyalaya, Harbanshpur, Jabdi, Shrawasti
53. Jai Maa Barahi Mahavidyalaya, Umri, Begamganj, Gonda
54. Janta Mahavidyalaya Evam Prashikshan Sansthan, Amdahi, Gonda
55. K R S Institute of Law, Indirapir, Gonda
56. Kalawati Devi Smarak Vidhi Mahavidyalaya, Uttamnagar, Badnapur, Bahraich
57. Kalawati Devi Smark Mahavidyalaya
58. Kamta Prasad Mathura Prasad Janta Mahavidyalaya, Babhnan, Gonda
59. Kedarnath Chaudhary Smarak Mahavidyalaya, Sonbarsa, Gonda
60. Kisan Degree College, Bangaon, Katra Bazar
61. Kisan Mahavidyalaya, Mahua Pakar, Babhanjot, Gaura Chauki, Gonda
62. KRS College of Higher Education
63. Lakhan Lal Sharan Singh Mahavidyalaya, Raghunathpur (Vishnoharpur), Gonda
64. Late Muneer Ahmad Balika Mahavidyalaya, Khargupur, Gonda
65. Late Sri Ravindra Singh Mahavidyalaya, Sahibapur, Wazeerganj, Gonda
66. Lord Buddha Mahavidyalaya, Saket Nagar, Rupaidiha, Bahraich
67. Lord Gautam Budh Institute, Karanpur, Paraspur, Gonda
68. M P Singh Smarak Mahila Mahavidyalaya, Panchputi, Jagtapur, Mankapur, Gonda
69. M P Singh Smarak Vidhi Mahavidyalaya, Panchputi, Jagtapur, Mankapur, Gonda
70. Maa Gayatri Ram Sukh Pandey Mahavidyalaya, Maskanwa, Gonda
71. Maa Gayatri Ramprasad Pandey Smarak Mahavidyalaya, Mugraul Bankati, Suryabali Singh, Gonda
72. Maa Gayatri Mangla Devi Pandey Smarak Mahavidyalay, Sothia, Motiganj, Gonda
73. Maa Kamla Devi Mahavidyalaya, Piprimafi, Shivpur
74. Mahakavi Tulsidas Mahavidyalaya, Paraspur, Gonda
75. Mahamaya Rajkiya Mahila Mahavidyalaya, Shrawasti
76. Maharaja Balbhadra Singh Raikwar Mahavidyalaya, Bankata Vikas Khand, Payagpur, Bahraich
77. Maharaja Devi Baksh Singh Smarak Sansthan, Banghusra, Dumariadeeh, Gonda
78. Maharani Lal Kunwari Snatkottar Mahavidyalaya, Balrampur
79. Maharishi Gautam Vidhi Mahavidyalaya, Mainpur, Nawabganj, Gonda
80. Mahila P.G. College, Bahraich
81. Mahila Shikshan Prashikshan Mahavidyalaya, Turkauli, Nawabganj
82. Manyawar Kanshiram Snatkottar Mahavidyalaya, Asidha (Chargupur), Gonda
83. Mata Ramdasi Mahila Mahavidyalaya, Bahadura Tikri
84. Meena Shah Institute of Technology and Management
85. Mithlesh Nandini Reshma Arif Mahavidyalaya, Nanpara, Bahraich
86. Nandini College, Nawabganj, District-Gonda
87. Kisan Post Graduate College, Bahraich
88. Nandini Educational Institute, Balapur, Nawabganj
89. Nandini Nagar Mahavidyalaya, Nawabganj, Gonda
90. Nandini Nagar Vidhi Mahavidyalaya, Nawabganj
91. National Mahila Mahavidyalaya, Rehra Bazar
92. Naveen Chandra Tiwari Smarak Mahavidyalaya, Parasaray, Itiyathok, Gonda
93. P P Singh Smarak Education College
94. Paramhans Mahavidyalaya, Kaiserganj, Bahraich
95. Pracharya Mishra Chandrika Prasad Sukhraj Kisan Mahavidyalaya, Shrawasti
96. Pran Devi Mahadev Mahavidyalaya, Payarkhas, Gonda
97. Pt Ashok Mishra Smarak Mahavidyalaya, Ashok Nagar, Bahraich
98. Pt Deen Dayal Upadhyay Gramodai Mahavidyalaya, Badalpur, Didisia Kala, Belsar, Gonda
99. Pt Jag Narain Shukl Gramodai Mahavidyalaya, Ranipur Pahari, Tarabganj, Gonda
100. Pt Ram Teerath Smarak Mahavidyalaya, Itiathok, Gonda
101. Pt Maharajdeen Shukla Shikshan Sewa Sansthan
102. Raghauram Diwakar Dutt Gyanodai Mahavidyalaya, Diwakar Nagar, Gonda
103. Raghuraj Sharan Singh Mahavidyalaya, Nakha Basant, Balpur
104. Raja Bhaiya Memorial Mahila Mahavidyalaya, Vanshpurwa, Mahsi
105. Raja Devi Bux Singh Awadh Raj Singh Mahavidyalaya Evam Parshikshan Sansthan
106. Raja Prem Singh Shiksha Mahavidyalaya, Tajkhudai, Bahraich
107. Raja Prem Singh Shiksha Mahavidyalaya, Kothi Raja Heera Singh, Bahraich
108. Raja Raghuraj Singh Mahavidyalaya, Mankapur, Gonda
109. Raja Virendra Kant Singh Mahavidyalaya, Bhinga, Shrawasti
110. Rajeshwari Singh Mahavidyalaya, Bhagahariya, Pure Mitai
111. Rajkiya Mahavidyalaya, Biloha, Gasadi
112. Rajkiya Mahavidyalaya, Bhawanipur Kala, Itiyathok, Gonda
113. Rajkiya Mahavidyalaya, Lengri, Gular, Shravasti
114. Rajkiya Mahavidyalaya, Pachpedwa, Balrampur
115. Rajmata Lalli Kumari Mahavidyalaya, Payagpur, Bahraich
116. Ram Chhatra Singh Mahavidyalaya, Kerawaniya, Shivpura
117. Ram Sunder Verma Smarak Mahavidyalaya, Bhaduli, Chilvariya, Bahraich
118. Rameshwar Dutt Memorial Mahavidyalaya, Krishna Nagar, Mahsi, Bahraich
119. Ramphal Memorial Kanya Mahavidyalaya
120. Ramtej Bhagauti Prasad Mahavidyalaya, Dharsawan
121. Rasik Bihari Mahavidyalaya, Badhnapur, Kanchar, Visheshwarganj, Bahraich
122. Ruprani Law College
123. Ruprani Mahila Mahavidyalaya
124. Sadhu Ram Vishwakarma Pragati Mahavidyalaya, Narottampur, Bahraich
125. Sanjeevani College of Law, Kirtanpur, Bahraich
126. Sanjeevani College Shikshan Avam Prashikshan Mahavidyalaya, Bahraich
127. Sanjeevani Mahavidyalaya, Kirtanpur, Bahraich
128. Sanjivnie College of Education and Teachers Training, BPES, Aladadpur, Kirtanpur, Bahraich
129. Saraswati Devi Nari Gyansthal Mahavidyalaya, Gonda
130. Saraswati Singh Mahila Mahavidyalaya, Mairiya, Parevpur, Shrawasti
131. Sardar Mohar Singh Memorial Mahila Mahavidyalaya, Bandhara, Mankapur, Gonda
132. Sarvoday Mahavidyalaya, Mihipurwa, Bahraich
133. Saryu Degree College, Karnailganj, Gonda
134. Satya Narain Uchcha Shiksha Sansthan, Tulsipur
135. Sayed Mohammad Ishtiyak Mahila Mahavidyalaya, Nawabganj, Gonda
136. Sayed Mohd Istayak Law Degree College
137. Sayeed Mohammad Ishtiyaak Mahavidyalaya, Kalyanpur, Nawabganj, Gonda
138. SCPM Ayurvedic Medical College and Hospital
139. SCPM College of Nursing
140. Seemawarti Degree College, Pandey Nagar, Jaitapur, Rupaidiha, Bahraich
141. Seeta Sharan Singh Mahavidyalay
142. Shakti Smarak Sansthan, Dulhinpur, Balrampur
143. Shakti Smarak Vidhi Sansthan, Dulhinpur, Balrampur
144. Shakuntala Memorial Educational Institute, Unnaisa, Bahraich
145. Shanti Devi Subhash Chandra Sushant Degree College, Subhashnagar, Chakujot
146. Shanti Yadav Degree College, Mohammad Nagar
147. Shashi Bhushan Sharan Singh Mahavidyalaya, Ujjaini Kalan
148. Sheetalganj Pratap Mahavidyalaya, Sheetal Ganj Grant, Maskanwa
149. Shivalik Mahavidyalaya, Patana, Khargaura, Bhinga, Shrawasti
150. Shivanshu Sushil Mahavidyalaya
151. Shri Avadh Raj Singh Smarak Mahavidyalay
152. Shri Durga Saptshati Vidhi Mahavidyalaya
153. Shri Lal Bahadur Shastri Degree College, Gonda
154. Shri Malti Prasad Sarpanch Gautam Buddha Girls Degree College
155. Shri Motilal Nishad Shanti Devi Mahavidyalay, Semrahana, Mihipurwa, Bahraich
156. Shri Umeshwar Pratap Singh Smarak Kisan Mahavidyalay
157. Shyamta Prasad Chaudhary Mahila Mahavidyalaya, Khargaura Basti, Katra, Shrawasti
158. Siddh Vinayak Mahavidyalay
159. Siddhi Vinayak Mahavidyalaya, Pipra Bazar, Gonda
160. Simant Mahavidyalaya, Rupaidiha, Bahraich
161. Smt. J. Devi Mahila Mahavidyalaya, Babhnan, Gonda
162. Sri Mahadev Shikshan Sansthan Mahavidyalaya, Ramnagar, Tarhar, Gonda
163. Sri Raghukul Mahila Vidyapeeth, Civil Lines, Gonda
164. Sri Ramteerth Chaudhary Mahavidyalaya, Banghusra, Utraula, Balrampur
165. Subhash Chandra Snatak Mahavidyalaya, Bankatwa, Sabarpur, Gonda
166. Swami Vivekananda Degree College, Phatwa, Balrampur
167. Tungnath Maurya Smarak Mahavidyalaya, Shrayaharra, Katra, Tarabganj
168. Udayraj Chandrabhan Shyama Devi Mahila Mahavidyalaya, Chandranagar, Khanpur, Hujurpur, Kaiserganj, Bahraich
169. Vasudev Singh Mahavidyalaya
170. Vimla Vikram Mahavidyalaya, Pachperwa, Balrampur
171. Vimla Vikram Vidhi Mahavidyalaya, Pachperwa, Balrampur
172. Vipin Bihari Sharan Singh Mahavidyalaya, Tarabganj
