= Maskanwa =

Maskanwa Maskanwa , Bazar Khale Gaon
- Location within Uttar Pradesh Location within India Location within Asia
- Coordinates: 26.9893914°N 82.3418856°E
- Country: India
- State: Uttar Pradesh
- District: Gonda
- Elevation: 103 m (338 ft)

Language
  - Official: Hindi
  - Additional official: Urdu
- Time zone: UTC+5:30 (IST)
- PIN: 271305
- Telephone code: 05265
- Vehicle registration: UP 43
- Sex ratio: 997/1000 ♂/♀

Maskanwa (Hindi: मसकनवाँ) is a railway station, local marketplace and settlement in the Mankapur tehsil of Gonda district in the Indian state of Uttar Pradesh. It is part of the Awadh region and falls under the administration of the Maskanva Gram Panchayat. The Maskanwa railway station lies on the Lucknow–Gorakhpur line of the North Eastern Railway zone. The Chhapiya block administrative centre at Chhapiya is situated near Maskanwa railway station and serves surrounding villages.

According to the 2011 Census of India, Maskanwa had a population of 1,508 across 228 households, comprising 776 males and 732 females. The official languages are Hindi and Urdu, while Awadhi is widely spoken in the region.

== Demographics ==
- As per provisional reports of Census India, the population of Maskanwa in 2011 was 1,508; of which 776 were males and 732 were females.

Religions in Maskanwa
Religion	Percent
Hindus	59.87%
Muslims	37.09%
Christianity	0.08%
Sikhism	0.07%
Jainism	0.01%
Buddhism	0.02%
Others†	0.09%
Distribution of religions †Includes Sikhs (0.07%), Buddhists (<0.02%), Christianity (<0.08%), Jainism (<0.01%).

== Education ==
The higher education landscape in Maskanwa and the surrounding region of Devipatan Division is anchored by a state university and a number of affiliated degree colleges.

=== Universities ===
- Maa Pateswari University, Balrampur, a state university established in 2024 for the Devipatan Division under the Uttar Pradesh State Universities Act, 1973. The university was set up to promote higher education in the districts of Balrampur, Gonda, Bahraich, and Shravasti. After its establishment, most of the colleges that were previously affiliated to Dr. Ram Manohar Lohia Awadh University were re-affiliated to Maa Pateswari University.

=== Affiliated colleges ===
Several colleges in and around Maskanwa are now affiliated to Maa Pateswari University:

- Maa Gayatri Ram Sukh Pandey Mahavidyalaya, Maskanwa, established in 2004, the college offers undergraduate and postgraduate programmes in Arts, Science, and Commerce. It was earlier affiliated to Dr. Ram Manohar Lohia Awadh University and is now affiliated to Maa Pateswari University.
- Sheetalganj Pratap Mahavidyalaya, a degree college located in Shitalganj Village in Maskanwa, formerly affiliated with Dr. Ram Manohar Lohia Awadh University and now under Maa Pateswari University.
- Bhagwan Prasad Sant Bakas Tiwari Vidhi Mahavidyalaya, Dubauli, a law college established in 2025 affiliated with Maa Pateswari University offers Law degree.

== Banking and financial services ==
Maskanwa has a developing banking network that serves the local population and nearby rural areas of Gonda district. The presence of both public and private sector banks facilitates financial inclusion, government scheme distribution, and rural credit services.

The following banks and financial institutions operate branches in and around Maskanwa:

- Indian Bank, Maskanwa, a branch of the nationalised Indian Bank offering retail and agricultural banking services.
- Indian Bank, Sheetalganj, another branch of Indian Bank located in the nearby area of Sheetalganj, catering to the local population and small traders.
- State Bank of India, Maskanwa, one of the oldest and largest branches in the locality, providing a range of banking and digital services to residents and government departments.
- HDFC Bank, Maskanwa, a private sector bank branch offering personal and business banking, ATM services, and digital transactions.
- Uttar Pradesh Gramin Bank, Maskanwa, a regional rural bank formed under the amalgamation of Gramin banks in Uttar Pradesh, providing financial services to farmers, self-help groups, and small enterprises.
- India Post Payments Bank, Maskanwa, operated by the Department of Posts, the branch functions within the premises of the Maskanwa Sub Post Office (SO) and provides basic banking and digital financial services to local residents.

== Transport ==
Maskanwa is connected by both rail and road. The Maskanwa railway station (station code: MSW) lies on the Lucknow–Gorakhpur line and is operated by the Lucknow NER railway division of the North Eastern Railway zone. Trains from this station link the area with nearby towns such as Mankapur, Gonda, Basti, Gorakhpur and Lucknow. Regular passenger and express services are available for daily commuters and travelers.

The village is also accessible by local roads that connect it to Mankapur and Chhapia, where bus services operate toward Gonda and other regional centres.

== Languages ==
The official language is Hindi and the additional official language is Urdu. The majority of the population speak Awadhi.
