= Paraspur =

- Panchayat
- Interactive map of Paraspur
- District: Gonda
- State: Uttar Pradesh
- Country: India

Population
  - Total: 203,937

Paraspur is a Nagar Panchayat and block headquarter in Gonda district, Uttar Pradesh, India. It is the biggest Block Panchayat in Gonda district, with 64 Village Panchayats and 91 villages. It comes under Colonelganj legislative assembly. The total population of Paraspur block Panchayat is 203,937, which consists of 105,736 males and 98,201 females, with a population density of 687 per square kilometer. Paraspur is a rural township around 20 km from Gonda and 100 km from Lucknow. Colonelganj, a historical town associated with the mutiny of 1857, lies 14 km to the north. About 22 km west lies Tikaitnagar, a town in Bara-Banki District. Colonelganj railway station, on the Bara-Banki—Gonda route, is the nearest railway station, and the nearest airport is Amausi Airport.

The male literacy rate is 57.06% and the female literacy rate is 26.61%. Rajapur, the birthplace of Shri Goswami Tulsidas, is just 8 km from the Block headquarter. Sukhar Khet (Paska), one of the famous places in Hindu mythology, lies 10 km to the south of Paraspur Block Panchayat.

== Education ==
Paraspur has several educational institutions providing education from the primary to higher secondary level. The following are some of the notable schools and colleges located in and around the town:

- Tulsi Smarak Inter College
- Beni Madhav Jang Bahadur Inter College
- R.B.P.S. School
- Swami Vivekananda School
- Swami Leelashah Inter College
- Educational institutions in nearby areas such as Pure Raghunath

For higher education, the town has:

- Mahakavi Tulsidas Post Graduate College, which is affiliated to Maa Pateswari University. The university was established by the Government of Uttar Pradesh to serve the Devipatan Division (Mandal).
