= Raja Raghuraj Singh =

- Raja of Mankapur
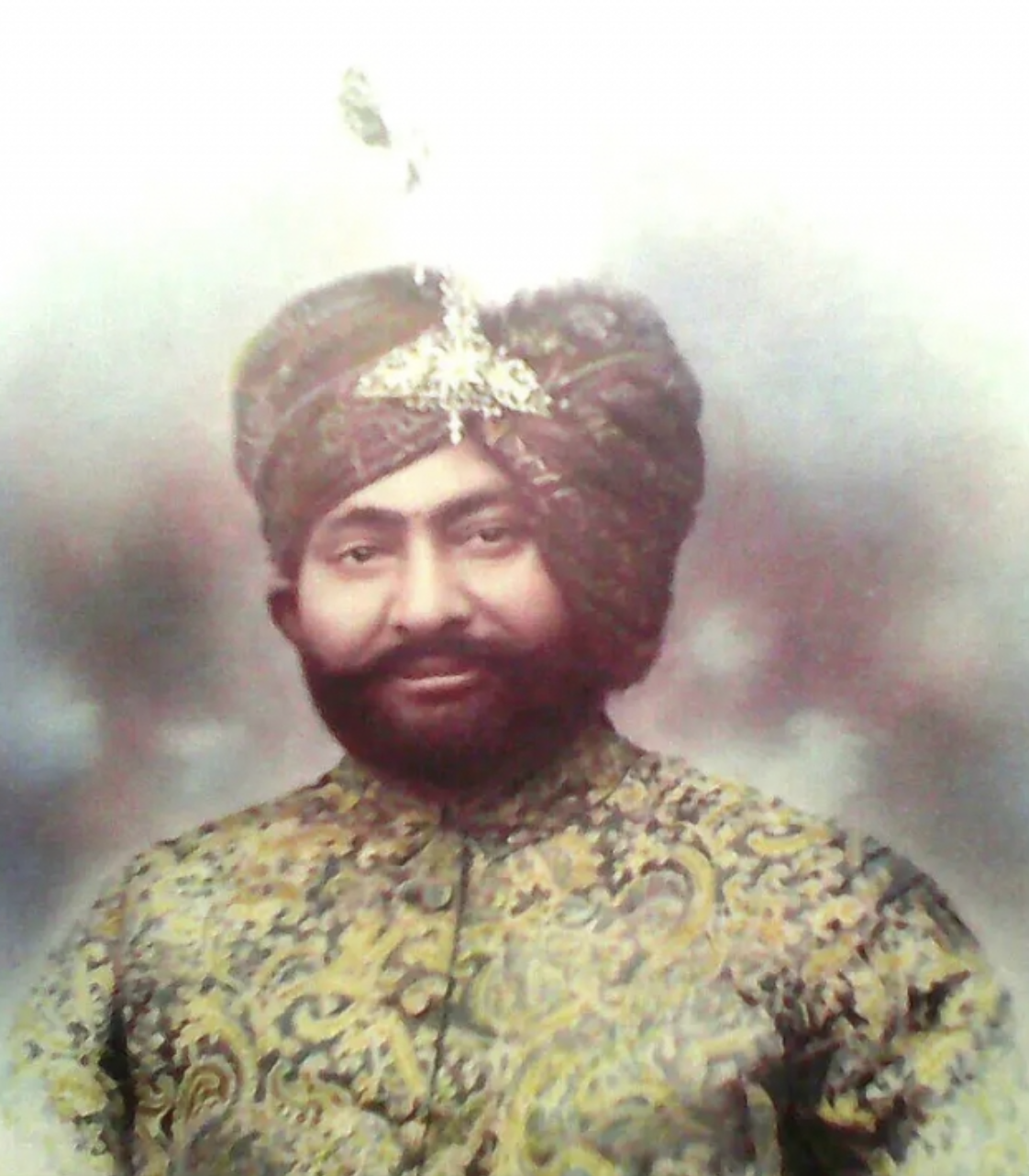
- Reign: 1886–1932
- Predecessor: Raja Prithvipath Singh
- Successor: Raja Raghavendra Pratap Singh
- Born: 20 April 1870; Machligaon, Manakpur, Gonda, United Provinces
- Died: 1932 (aged 61–62); Manakpur Palace, Gonda, United Provinces
- House: Bisen Dynasty

Raja Raghuraj Singh OBE (1880–1932) was a taluqdar and a figure in the Mankapur Estate, located in Uttar Pradesh, India. Known for his influence and leadership, he was an active participant in India's freedom struggle, supporting the nationalist movement in the Gonda district and hosting notable leaders of the independence movement.

== Early life ==
Born on April 20, 1870, Raghuraj Singh was part of the Bisen Rajput lineage, with roots traced back to Raja Prithvi Mall of Majhauli, linking him to other notable Bisen families in Gonda, Bhinga, and Kalakankar. In 1886, at the age of sixteen, he inherited the Mankapur Estate following the death of his father, Bhaiya Jai Prakash Singh. His early years were spent in the family residence, "Purwa," in the village of Machligaon.

== Estate management and local influence ==
Taking control of Mankapur Estate during a period of economic and administrative challenges, Singh worked to rebuild its standing. He implemented measures to establish order and control over the estate, addressing tenant disputes that had arisen during his predecessors' management. His influence in the region was marked not only by his governance but also by his engagement with local affairs, which positioned him as a leader in the community.

== Role in India's freedom struggle ==
Singh is remembered for his contribution to India's struggle for independence, particularly in the Gonda district. He played a significant role during the historic visit of Mahatma Gandhi and Jawaharlal Nehru to Gonda in 1929, demonstrating his support for the freedom movement. On October 9, 1929, he led thousands to Mankapur railway station to welcome Gandhi and Nehru, who were touring to inspire participation in the nationalist cause.

Later that day, more than 2,000 people, including peasants and local elites, gathered at Singh's residence, where Gandhi and Nehru rested briefly. Gandhi delivered an inspiring speech that resonated deeply with the assembled crowd. At the end of the speech, Singh presented Gandhi with a purse containing a generous donation, a gesture that inspired others to contribute as well, with residents of nearby areas such as Raniganj Bazaar collectively donating over ₹3,000. His actions that day underscored his commitment to the freedom struggle and encouraged local elites to rally around the nationalist movement.

== Construction of Mankapur Kott ==
Central to Singh's legacy was the construction of his residence, Mankapur Kott. Inspired by Butler Palace in Lucknow, he commissioned the same architect to design Mankapur Kott, along with the additional estates of Mangalbhawan and Manorama Kothi. Completed in 1919, the palace spanned eight acres, with living quarters for family members around its perimeter and a central zenankhana (women's quarters). Adjacent to the palace, he restored an ancient Devi temple, where he revived traditional Dussehra ceremonies that included ritual sacrifices, reflecting his respect for cultural and religious practices of the region.

== Personal life ==
Singh married five times (three formal alliances and two informal partnerships), resulting in four sons and six daughters, who went on to form alliances with other prominent families across Uttar Pradesh and Rajasthan. Among his companions was Josephine Carr, an Anglo-Indian who introduced Western customs to his household, reflecting a blend of traditional and Western influences in his lifestyle. Carr often accompanied him on social occasions and hunts, preparing the family for interactions with British society.

He is the father of Raja Raghavendra Pratap Singh, and the grandfather to Raja Anand Singh (Four-time Lok Sabha MP and MLA, former Agriculture Minister)

=== Titles, honors, and legacy ===
Singh's engagement with the British administration further solidified his position in the region. He served as a Member of the Legislative Council and received the Order of the British Empire, securing the hereditary title of "Raja" in 1903. His active role in the independence movement, combined with his support for the British administration, highlighted the complexity of regional leadership under colonial rule.

Singh died in 1932, leaving behind a legacy that encompassed both traditional leadership and a commitment to India's independence. His contributions to the nationalist movement and the cultural landscape of Mankapur are remembered as pivotal in the region's history, with his descendants continuing to play influential roles in Uttar Pradesh's social and political spheres.
