= Bahman Jyotia Halt railway station =

Railway station in Uttar Pradesh

Babhan Jyotia Halt

General information
- Location: State Highway 1A, Maskanwa, Gonda district, Uttar Pradesh; India
- Coordinates: 26°57′59″N 82°25′38″E
- Elevation: 100 metres (330 ft)
- System: Indian Railways station
- Owner: Indian Railways
- Line: Lucknow–Gorakhpur line
- Platforms: 2
- Tracks: 2

Construction
- Structure type: Standard (on ground)
- Parking: Yes

Other information
- Status: Functioning
- Station code: BNGY
- Zone(s): North Eastern Railway zone
- Division(s): Lucknow NER
Location
- Location within India Location within Uttar Pradesh

Babhan Jyotia Halt railway station is a halt railway station on Lucknow–Gorakhpur line under the Lucknow NER railway division of North Eastern Railway zone. This is situated beside State Highway 1A at Maskanwa in Gonda district in the Indian state of Uttar Pradesh.

| Preceding station | Indian Railways | Following station |
|---|---|---|
| Parsa Tiwari towards ? | North Eastern Railway zone Lucknow–Gorakhpur section | Swami Narayan Chhapia towards ? |
