= Rajwapur =

- village
- Interactive map of Rajwapur
- Country: India
- State: Uttar Pradesh
- Division: Devipatan Division
- District: Gonda District
- Time zone: UTC+05:30 (IST)

Rajwapur is a village in Gonda district, Uttar Pradesh.

== Geography ==
Rajwapur village comes under Colonelganj and Block Haldharmau in Gonda district. It is at a 5 km distance from Colonelganj on Behraich road. It is located at 27.13°N 81.7°E. It has an average elevation of 119 metres (390 feet). It has a very natural environment with a river Saryu flowing near some distance.

== Literacy ==
Literacy rate is moderate. There is a Primary school in the village and the children either have to go to some local private schools or to schools of the other villages. There are very few boys who are even class X passed.

== Activities ==
Mostly the people are farmers and labourers.
