= Prabhat Kumar Verma =

Indian politician (born 1969)

Member of Uttar Pradesh Legislative Assembly
- Incumbent
- Assumed office March 2017
- Preceded by: Raja Anand Singh
- Constituency: Gaura

Personal details
- Born: 15 January 1969 (age 57) Gonda, Uttar Pradesh
- Party: Bharatiya Janata Party
- Parent: Thakur Prasad Verma (father)
- Education: LLB
- Alma mater: University of Lucknow
- Profession: Politician

Prabhat Kumar Verma is an Indian politician and a member of the 18th Uttar Pradesh Assembly from the Gaura Assembly constituency of the Gonda district. He is a member of the Bharatiya Janata Party.

== Early life ==
Prabhat Kumar Verma was born on 15 January 1969 in Gonda, Uttar Pradesh, to a Hindu family of Thakur Prasad Verma. He married Pushpa Verma in 1988, and they have two children.

== Education ==
Prabhat Kumar Verma completed his graduation with a Bachelor of Laws at the University of Lucknow in 1996.

== Posts held ==
#	From	To	Position	Ref
01	March 2017	March 2022	Member, 17th Uttar Pradesh Assembly	
02	March 2022	Incumbent	Member, 18th Uttar Pradesh Assembly	

== See also ==
- Gaura Assembly constituency
- 18th Uttar Pradesh Assembly
- Uttar Pradesh Legislative Assembly
