= Lakhpat Nagar railway station =

Railway station in Uttar Pradesh

Lakhpat Nagar

General information
- Location: State Highway 9, Amava, Mankapur, Gonda district, Uttar Pradesh; India
- Coordinates: 27°01′39″N 82°16′39″E
- Elevation: 101 metres (331 ft)
- System: Indian Railways station
- Owner: Indian Railways
- Line: Lucknow–Gorakhpur line
- Platforms: 2
- Tracks: 2

Construction
- Structure type: Standard (on ground)
- Parking: Yes

Other information
- Status: Functioning
- Station code: LKNR
- Zone(s): North Eastern Railway zone
- Division(s): Lucknow NER
Location
- Location within India Location within Uttar Pradesh

Lakhpat Nagar railway station is a railway station on Lucknow–Gorakhpur line under the Lucknow NER railway division of North Eastern Railway zone. This is situated beside State Highway 9 at Amava, Mankapur in Gonda district in the Indian state of Uttar Pradesh.

Preceding station	Indian Railways	Following station
Maskanwa towards ?	North Eastern Railway zone Lucknow–Gorakhpur section	Mankapur Junction towards ?
