= LBS Degree College =

Degree College in Uttar Pradesh, India

Shri Lal Bahadur Shastri Degree College
- Type: Public, co-education, government-aided
- Established: 2 October 1966; 59 years ago
- Founder: Shri Rajendra Nath
- Accreditation: NAAC
- Affiliations: Maa Pateswari University
- President: Neha Sharma
- Vice-president: Varsha Singh
- Principal: Prof. Ravindra Kumar
- Location: Civil lines, Gonda, Uttar Pradesh, 271003, India
- Campus: Urban
- Language: Hindi, English
- Website: lbsdc.org.in

Shri Lal Bahadur Shastri Degree College (abbr. L.B.S. Degree College) is a government aided postgraduate degree college which is accredited by University Grants Commission (India), 'B' grade by National Assessment and Accreditation Council and affiliated to Maa Pateswari University. It is located in Gonda district of Uttar Pradesh, India.

== History ==
The college was established in 1966 by former DM, the late Shri Rajendra Nath, in the memory of late Prime Minister Lal Bahadur Shastri.

== Campuses ==
This college has three campuses:

- Main Campus
- Science Campus
- B.Ed Campus
