= ITI Township Mankapur =

ITI Township Manakur (also Sanchar Vihar Colony) is a township and a Nagar Panchayat (Notified Area Council) in Gonda district in the Indian state of Uttar Pradesh.

== Administration ==
It is a residential colony under the Mankapur Unit of ITI Limited. It is a constituency of Uttar Pradesh Legislative Assembly.

== History ==
It was established in 1983 for manufacturing Nation’s first Electronic Switching System (E-10B) in collaboration with M/S CIT-Alcatel. Mankapur started manufacturing OCB/CSN Exchanges from 1993-94 and supplied 3000 KL to BSNL/ MTNL. The plant started manufacturing Base Trans-receiver Station (BTS rack) for GSM equipment in technical collaboration with M/S ALCATEL from July 2005. The plant produces Bank Mechanization Products like Note Counting and Fake Note Detecting machines. The plant has built a new infrastructure for manufacturing LED-based products like LED solar lantern and LED street lights for rural applications, LED tube lights and decorative indoor lights for Grid-based urban applications.

Projects of national importance like Network For Spectrum (NFS) and National Population Register (NPR-40) are being executed by ITI Mankapur plant.

The Unit is proud of winning Prime Minister’s National Shram Award (viz, 11 Shram Devi & 01 Shram Shree). The Unit is ISO 9001-2008 certified and accredited with ISO 14001: 2004 Certification for Environment Management System.

== Climate ==
The climate is a subtropcal humid climate. The rainiest month is in July and the coldest month is in January.

== Education ==
The township hosts three schools:

- Kendriya Vidayala is situated in the premises of ITI Limited, Mankapur. The school works for students' physical, mental, educational, emotional, ethical and spiritual development. The founding stone was laid on 24 November 1987 by Shri Dharmavir Gupta, the then Caretaker Managing Director.
- St. Michael’s Convent School.
- DAV ITI Mankapur. Dayanand Adarsh Vidyalaya

== Geography ==
- Gonda (30 km)
- Faizabad (50 km)
- Gorakhpur (156 km)
- Lucknow (179 km)
- Varanasi (235 km)

== Transport ==
Mankapur is well connected by train and road. The nearest railway station is Mankapur Junction (4 km). The nearest airport is Ayodhya Airport (46 km).

Railway stations such as Gorakhpur, Lucknow, and Varanasi are connected with Mankapur Junction.

== Tourism ==
Major tourist places near Mankapur

- Ayodhaya (35 km), Train Links
- Varanasi (235 km),
- Shravasti (90 km)
- Sunauli, Nepal Border
