= Ajay Pratap Singh (Uttar Pradesh politician) =

Indian politician (1964–2025)

Kunwar Ajay Pratap Singh

Member of Uttar Pradesh Legislative Assembly
- In office 2017–2022
- Preceded by: Yogesh Pratap Singh
- Succeeded by: Ajay Kumar Singh
- Constituency: Colonelganj
- In office 2007–2008
- Preceded by: Yogesh Pratap Singh
- Succeeded by: Kunwari Brij Singh
- Constituency: Colonelganj
- In office 1989–2002
- Preceded by: Umeshwar Pratap Singh
- Succeeded by: Yogesh Pratap Singh
- Constituency: Colonelganj

Personal details
- Born: March 27, 1964 Colonelganj, Gonda, Uttar Pradesh, India
- Died: January 23, 2025 (aged 60) Lucknow, Uttar Pradesh, India
- Party: Bharatiya Janata Party
- Other political affiliations: Bahujan Samaj Party Indian National Congress Independent
- Relations: Kunwari Brij Singh (sister)
- Parent: Kunwar Madan Mohan Singh (father)
- Nickname: Lalla Bhaiyya

Kunwar Ajay Pratap Singh, also known as Lalla Bhaiyya, was an Indian politician and six-time Member of the Legislative Assembly (MLA) from the Colonelganj Assembly constituency in Gonda district, Uttar Pradesh. He was associated with the former princely state of Bargadi Kot. He died on 23 January 2025 at the age of 60.

== Career ==
Singh started his political career in 1989 as an independent candidate, securing his first election victory. In 1991, he joined the Bharatiya Janata Party and was re-elected from the Colonelganj Assembly constituency. He continued his tenure as MLA with consecutive wins in 1993 and 1996 on the BJP ticket.

In 2002, he contested the elections but lost to Yogesh Pratap Singh of the Samajwadi Party. In 2007, he contested election from Indian National Congress party and won the seat. In the 2008 by-elections, he supported his sister, Kunwari Brij Singh, who contested on a Bahujan Samaj Party ticket and won the election. In the 2012 Assembly elections, he lost by a narrow margin to Yogesh Pratap Singh. He was elected again from the Colonelganj constituency in the 2017 Assembly elections. In 2022, he did not receive a ticket from the BJP to contest the election.

== Health issues and death ==
Singh suffered a heart attack a year before his death and was undergoing treatment. He died on 23 January 2025 at Medanta Hospital in Lucknow at the age of 60. His funeral took place at Katra Shahbazpur Mela Bagiya. Thirty days after his death, his sister, former MLA Kunwari Brij Singh, also died.
