= Gorakhpur–Dehradun Rapti Ganga Express =

Train in India

Dehradun Gorakhpur Express
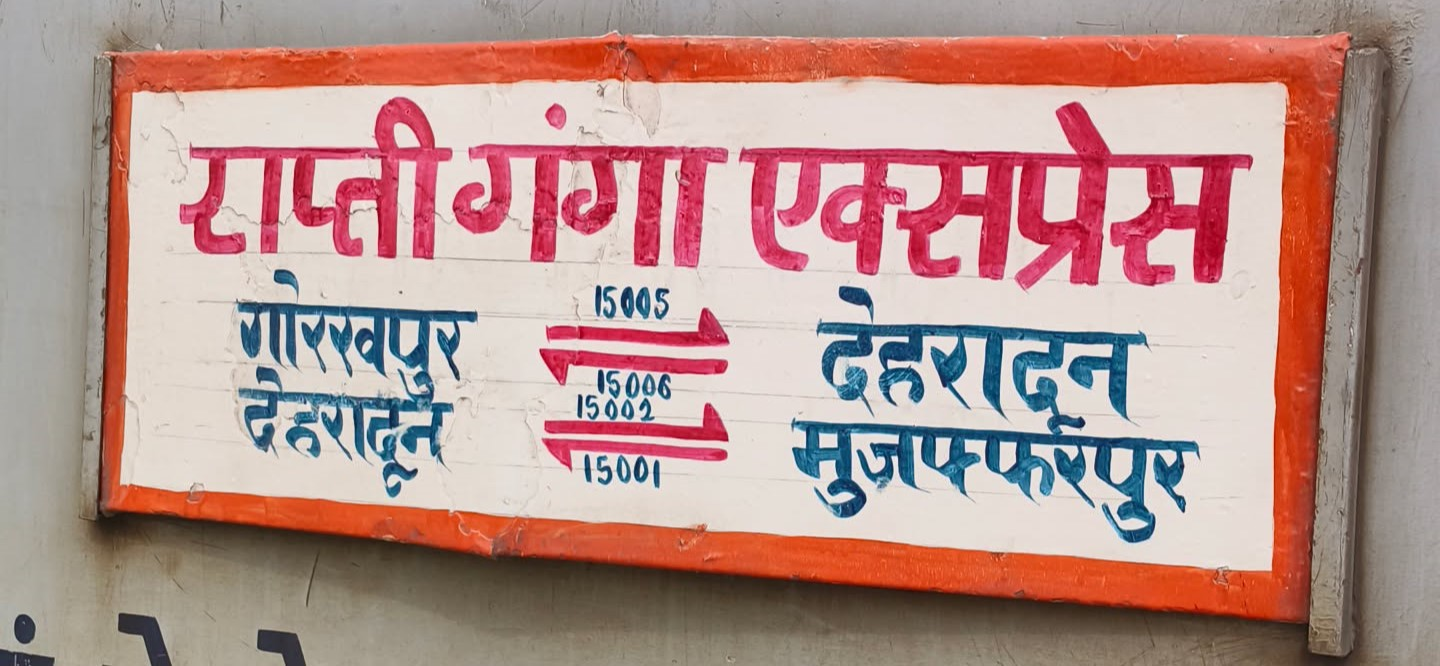

Overview
- Service type: Express
- Current operator: North Eastern Railways

Route
- Termini: Dehradun; Gorakhpur Junction
- Stops: 14
- Distance travelled: 815 km (506 mi)
- Average journey time: 16 hours 50 minutes as 15005 Gorakhpur–Dehradun Express, 16 hours 25 minutes as 15006 Dehradun–Gorakhpur Junction Express
- Service frequency: 15006 Dehradun–Gorakhpur Express – Tuesday & Thursday, 15005 Gorakhpur–Dehradun Express – Wednesday & Friday.
- Train number: 15005 / 15006

On-board services
- Classes: AC 2 tier, AC 3 tier, Sleeper Class, General Unreserved
- Seating arrangements: Yes
- Sleeping arrangements: Yes
- Catering facilities: No pantry car attached
- Observation facilities: Rake sharing with 15001 / 02 Dehradun–Muzaffarpur Express

Technical
- Rolling stock: Standard Indian Railways coaches
- Track gauge: 1,676 mm (5 ft 6 in)
- Operating speed: 110 km/h (68 mph) maximum 49.02 km/h (30 mph) including halts

The 15006 / 05 Dehradun–Gorakhpur Express is an Express train belonging to Indian Railways – North Eastern Railway zone that runs between Dehradun & Gorakhpur Junction in India.

It operates as train number 15006 from Dehradun to Gorakhpur Junction and as train number 15005 in the reverse direction serving the states of Uttarakhand and Uttar Pradesh.

== Coaches ==
The 15006 / 05 Dehradun–Gorakhpur Express has 1 AC 2 tier, 5 AC 3 tier, 6 Sleeper Class, 4 General Unreserved 1EOG and 1 SLR (Seating cum Luggage Rake) coaches. It does not carry a pantry car.

As is customary with most train services in India, coach composition may be amended at the discretion of Indian Railways depending on demand.

== Service ==
The 15006 Dehradun–Gorakhpur Express covers the distance of 815 kilometres in 16 hours 25 mins (49.64 km/h) and in 16 hours 50 mins as 15005 Gorakhpur–Dehradun Express (48.42 km/h).

== Routeing ==
The 15006 / 05 Dehradun–Gorakhpur Junction Express runs from Dehradun via Haridwar Junction, Laksar Junction, Bareilly, Lucknow NR, Gonda Junction, Basti to Gorakhpur Junction.

== Traction ==
As the route is yet to be fully electrified, a Lucknow or Gonda-based WDM-3A hauls the train for its entire journey

== Timings ==
15006 Dehradun–Gorakhpur Express leaves Dehradun every Tuesday and Thursday at 15:30 hrs IST and reaches Gorakhpur Junction at 07:55 hrs IST the next day.

15005 Gorakhpur–Dehradun Express leaves Gorakhpur Junction every Wednesday and Friday at 21:10 hrs IST and reaches Dehradun at 14:00 hrs IST the next day.
