= Babu Ishwar Sharan Singh =

Member of Uttar Pradesh Legislative Assembly(MLA), from Gonda
- In office 1967–1969

Personal details
- Born: 5 August 1902 Gonda, Uttar Pradesh, British Raj
- Died: 26 August 1991 (aged 89)

Babu Ishwar Sharan Singh was an Indian freedom fighter, social worker and politician. He was born in Gonda, Uttar Pradesh. He was elected as a Member of the Uttar Pradesh Legislative Assembly from Gonda Assembly constituency. He died on 26 August 1991.

== Early life and education ==
Ishwar Sharan Singh was born on 5 August 1902 in Gonda district, Uttar Pradesh.

He completed his primary education from Ramdas Arya Pathshala, Etah. In 1915 and 1916 he admitted in Rajkiya High School, Gonda.

== Legacy ==
On his memory a district governmental hospital, Babu Ishwar Sharan Singh Chikitshalaya in Gonda.

== See also ==
- Fasi-ur-Rehman Munnan Khan
- Gonda district
