= Bindumati Devi =

Indian politician

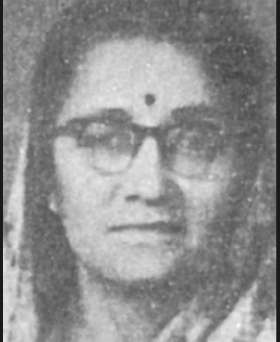

Member of Parliament, Rajya Sabha
- In office 9 July 1967 – 2 April 1972
- President: Varahagiri Venkata Giri
- Prime Minister: Indira Gandhi
- Constituency: Uttar Pradesh

Member of Legislative Assembly, Uttar Pradesh
- In office 1957–1962
- President: Dr. Rajendra Prasad
- Prime Minister: Jawaharlal Nehru
- Constituency: Pratapganj, Barabanki

Personal details
- Born: 19 July 1918
- Died: 10 July 2003 (aged 84)
- Party: Indian National Congress
- Other political affiliations: Congress (O)
- Spouse: Dr. R. B. Das
- Children: Veena Singh

Bindumati Devi (19 July 1918 – 22 July 2002), also recorded as Bindumati Das, was a significant political figure from Uttar Pradesh, India. Her political journey was marked by various milestones that reflected her commitment to public service and justice. She served as a member of the Rajya Sabha from 1967 to 1972, representing Uttar Pradesh at the national level. Before this, she was elected to the Uttar Pradesh Legislative Assembly in 1957, representing the Pratapganj constituency in Barabanki district. Her boldness and integrity were notable, as she was known to oppose unjust bills proposed by her own party, demonstrating her dedication to fair governance and justice.

Bindumati Devi was the daughter of Kunwar Maheshwar Vats Singh. She attended Theosophical National Girls College, Mahila College, and Isabella Thoburn College. She married R. B. Das, and they had one daughter, Veena Singh, who later married Raja Anand Singh, adding to the family's notable social connections. She is also the grandmother of Union Minister of State for Environment, Forest and Climate Change and External Affairs, Shri Kirti Vardhan Singh, and three others, Niharika Singh, Shivani Roy and Radhika Singh.

Bindumati Devi's political career was not just limited to her roles in the legislature. She was deeply involved in social causes and worked tirelessly for the uplift of her constituents. Her efforts were particularly focused on improving the conditions of women and marginalized communities in her region.

In addition to her legislative work, Bindumati Devi was an advocate for education and healthcare. She believed in the power of education as a means to uplift society and worked towards establishing schools and healthcare facilities in her constituency. Her commitment to these causes earned her widespread respect and admiration among her peers and the public.

Bindumati Devi's life and career were characterized by her unwavering dedication to justice and equality. She faced numerous challenges with resilience and courage, making significant contributions to the political landscape of Uttar Pradesh and India. Her legacy continues to inspire many in the field of politics, particularly women who look up to her as a role model for her fearless and principled approach to public service

== Legislative career ==
=== Uttar Pradesh Legislative Assembly ===
At the 1957 assembly election Bindumati Devi stood for the Indian National Congress in Pratapganj, a constituency in Barabanki district that returned two members. She won one of the two seats with 37,229 votes; the other went to her party colleague Babu Lal Kusumesh, who polled 37,568. The assembly's official directory of members, published in 1959, lists her under the name Bindumati Das as the Congress member for Pratapganj.

=== Rajya Sabha ===
She entered the Rajya Sabha from Uttar Pradesh on 9 July 1967 and sat until 2 April 1972, when she retired at the end of the term. The Rajya Sabha's record of former members lists her with the Congress (O), the wing of the party that separated from Indira Gandhi's Congress in the split of 1969.

== Electoral history ==
Elections contested by Bindumati Devi
Year	House	Constituency	Party	Result	Votes	Main opponent	Opponent's votes	Margin
1957	Uttar Pradesh Legislative Assembly	Pratapganj, Barabanki (two-member seat)	Indian National Congress	Won	37,229	Mendi Lal (Independent)	24,868	12,361
1967 (by-election)	Rajya Sabha	Uttar Pradesh	Indian National Congress	Won	—	—	—	—

Sources: 1957 assembly result; Rajya Sabha record of former members. Rajya Sabha members are elected by the members of the state assembly, not by popular vote, so no vote figures are shown for 1967.

== Kotwa Dham and family ==
Bindumati Devi's home was at Kotwa Dham in Barabanki district, the site of the temple of Jagjivan Das, founder of the Satnami sect in the region, and a place of pilgrimage.

She was a Mahant of Kotwa Dham, belonging to the Majhla Ghar (the middle of the three houses descended from Jagjivan Das). Across the region, devotees and followers of the house continue to recount Bindumati Devi’s acts of generosity and the support she extended to people from all sections of society. Her legacy continues through her daughter Rani Veena Singh of Mankapur.

Her daughter Veena married Anand Singh of Mankapur on 19 February 1960. Anand Singh went on to serve four terms in the Lok Sabha and twice as Uttar Pradesh's Minister of Agriculture.
