= Nandini Nagar Mahavidyalaya =

College in Uttar Pradesh, India

Coordinates: 26.853173°N 82.176361°E

- नन्दिनी नगर महाविद्यालय
- Motto: वयं राष्ट्रे जागृयाम पुरोहिताः
- Motto in English: We wake up in the nation, priests
- Type: College, Self Financed
- Established: 11 November 1994; 31 years ago
- Affiliations: Maa Pateswari University
- Chairman: Brijbhushan Sharan Singh
- Vice-Chancellor: Prof. Manoj Dixit
- Principal: Dr. B.L. Singh
- Director: Prateek Bhushan Singh
- Location: Nawabganj, Gonda, Uttar Pradesh, India
- Campus: Rural
- Colours
- Website: www.nnmv.org.in

Nandini Nagar Mahavidyalaya (NNM) is a college located at Nawabganj, Gonda in Uttar Pradesh, India. The college is affiliated to Maa Pateswari University, previously, it was affiliated to Dr. Ram Manohar Lohia Avadh University and approved by Pharmacy Council of India for providing diploma in pharmacy.

== History ==
It was founded on 11 November 1994.

== Programmes ==
The college offers undergraduate & Postgraduate course under the aegis of Ram Manohar Lohia Awadh University in –

- Bachelor of Science in Agriculture [B.Sc.(Hons) Agriculture]
- M.Sc.Agriculture - (Agronomy, Horticulture, Genetics & Plant Breeding, Animal Husbandry, Entomology, Soil Science)
- Bachelor of Science (B.Sc.) in Pharmacy
- Diploma in Pharmacy (D.Pharma)
- Bachelor of Arts (B.A)
- Bachelor of Commerce (B.Com.)
- Bachelor of Education (B.Ed.)
- Bachelor of Science (B.Sc.)
- Bachelor of Physical Education (B.P.Ed)
- Bachelor of Business Administration (B.B.A.)
- Bachelor of Computer Application (B.C.A)
- Bachelor of Library Science (B.Lib)
- Master of Education (M.Ed.)
- Master of Physical Education (M.P.Ed)
- Master Of Science (M.Sc.) - Physics, Chemistry, Botany, Zoology, Maths, Defense Strategies
- Master of Arts (M.A) - Psychology, English, Hindi, Geography, Ancient History, Political Science, Sociology, Education, Defense Strategies
- Master of Commerce (M.Com.)
- Master of Library Science (M.Lib)
