= Raja Devi Bakhsh Singh =

Indian Freedom Fighter

- Maharaja
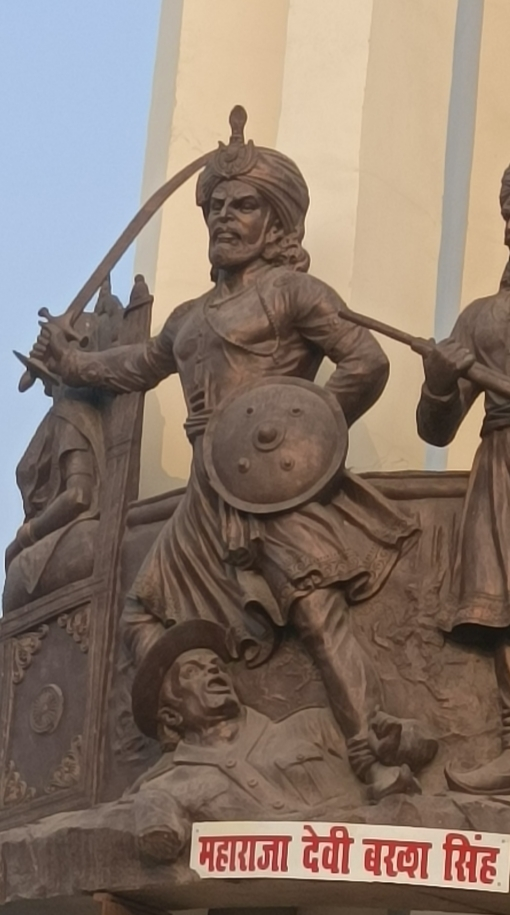
- Raja Devi Bakhsh Singh statue at Kranti Park (Gonda)
- Predecessor: Raja Guman Singh
- Born: c. 1800s Jigna village, Gonda, Uttar Pradesh
- Died: 1866 (aged 65–66); Nepal
Era name and dates
- Modern: 19th century
- Dynasty: Bisen
- Father: Daljeet Singh (adoptive father)
- Religion: Hinduism

Raja Devi Bakhsh Singh was a British-era King from Gonda, Uttar Pradesh. He was born in 19th century AD. He featured in the Indian Rebellion of 1857 and is represented as symbol of religious harmony in India.

Born in Jigna village of Gonda district. He was 12th king of Gonda succeeded by 11th king Raja Guman Singh. His father name was Daljeet Singh.

== In Revolt ==
On 5 July 1857 Begum Hazrat Mahal sent a letter to king Bakhsh singh during Avadh Revolution for help.

== Death ==
He moved to Devkhur, Nepal and later died in 1866 from Malaria.

== Legacy ==
Raja Devi Bakhsh Singh Library (Hindi: राजा देवी बख्श सिंह स्मारक बाल पुस्तकालय) was founded on 25 May 1974 by Nagar Palika Gonda. This library is situated in front of Sagar Talab (pond) in Gonda.

State Medical College is under construction in Gonda district, it is named in Devi Bakhsh Singh's honour.
