= Tharakki Patti =

Tharakki Patti (Thadakki Paati) is a village in the Northern Indian state of Uttar Pradesh. It is located in the Tarabganj of Gonda district. It has a population of 5,000 people, which is more than double as it was 5 years ago
