= Adam Gondvi =

Indian poet (1947–2011)

- Born: Ram Nath Singh; 22 October 1947; Atta Paraspur, Gonda, Uttar Pradesh
- Died: 18 December 2011 (aged 64); Sanjay Gandhi Postgraduate Institute of Medical Sciences, Lucknow
- Occupation: Poet
- Writing career
- Language: Hindi, Awadhi
- Notable awards: Dushyant Kumar award in 1998

Adam Gondvi (born Ram Nath Singh; 22 October 1947 – 18 December 2011) was an Indian poet from Atta Paraspur, Gonda, Uttar Pradesh. He wrote Poetry in Hindi, highlighting the plight of marginalized castes, Dalits, impoverished people. He was born in a poor farmer family that nonetheless had considerable arable land. Gondvi's poetry was known for social commentary, scathing view of corrupt politicians and revolutionary nature.

In 1998, Madhya Pradesh government awarded him with the Dushyant Kumar prize. In 2007 he was awarded Maati Ratan Samman by Shaheed Shodha Sansthan for his contributions to Awadhi/Hindi.

Gondvi died on 18 December 2011 in Sanjay Gandhi Postgraduate Institute of Medical Sciences, Lucknow due to stomach ailments.

His poetry collections Dharti Ki Satah Par (Surface of the Earth) and Samay Se Muthbhed (Encounter with Time) were popular and acclaimed for their ghazals.

Some of his well-known poems are

- Tumhari filon mein gaaon ka mausam gulaabi hai
- Main chamaaro ki gali tak le chaloonga aapko, aaiye mehsoos kijiye
- Sau mein sattar aadmi filhal jab nashad hai
- Kaju bhuni plate mein, whiskey bhari gilaas mein
- Rajmangal Prakashan has published a book by Adam Gondvi titled: "I will take you to the colony of the Chamars and other poems" This collection is a translation of seventy-four of his original works (ghazals, nazms, and poems) from Hindi and Urdu.

Gondvi died on 18 December 2011 in Lucknow, Uttar Pradesh, in poverty and supported by social activist donations.
