= Maskanwa railway station =

Railway station in Uttar Pradesh

Maskanwa

General information
- Location: Babhnan-Mankapur Road, Khale Gaon, Maskanwa, Gonda district, Uttar Pradesh; India
- Coordinates: 26°00′05″N 82°21′35″E
- Elevation: 103 metres (338 ft)
- System: Indian Railways station
- Owner: Indian Railways
- Line: Lucknow–Gorakhpur line
- Platforms: 2
- Tracks: 2

Construction
- Structure type: Standard (on ground)
- Parking: Yes

Other information
- Status: Functioning
- Station code: MSW
- Zone(s): North Eastern Railway zone
- Division(s): Lucknow NER
Location
- Location within India Location within Uttar Pradesh

Maskanwa railway station is a railway station on Lucknow–Gorakhpur line under the Lucknow NER railway division of North Eastern Railway zone. This is situated beside Babhnan-Mankapur Road, at Khale Gaon, Maskanwa in Gonda district in the Indian state of Uttar Pradesh.

Preceding station	Indian Railways	Following station
Swami Narayan Chhapia towards ?	North Eastern Railway zone Lucknow–Gorakhpur section	Lakhpat Nagar towards ?
