= Ajay (Uttar Pradesh politician) =

Indian politician

Ajay Kumar Singh

Member of the Uttar Pradesh Legislative Assembly
- Incumbent
- Assumed office 2022
- Preceded by: Kunwar Ajay Pratap Singh alias Lalla Bhaiya
- Constituency: Colonelganj

Personal details
- Born: 1 July 1983 (age 42) Gonda district, Uttar Pradesh
- Party: Bharatiya Janata Party
- Education: Post Graduation in History (JLNM Post Graduate College, Barabanki)

Ajay Kumar Singh (born 1 July 1983) is an Indian politician from Uttar Pradesh. He is a member of the Uttar Pradesh Legislative Assembly from Colonelganj Assembly constituency in Gonda district. He won the 2022 Uttar Pradesh Legislative Assembly election representing the Bharatiya Janata Party.

== Early life and education ==
Ajay is born in Gonda, Uttar Pradesh. He is the son of Shivkumar Singh. He married Priyanka Singh, a panchayat member, in December 2012 and together they have a son and a daughter. He completed his post graduation in history in 2005 at JLNM Post Graduate College, Barabanki, which is affiliated with Dr. Ram Manohar Lohiya National Law University.

== Career ==
Ajay became an MLA for the first time winning the 2022 Uttar Pradesh Legislative Assembly election from Colonelganj Assembly constituency representing Bharatiya Janata Party. He polled 108,109 votes and defeated his nearest rival, Yogesh Pratap Singh of Samajwadi Party, by a margin of 35,472 votes.
