= Parsa Tiwari railway station =

Railway station in Uttar Pradesh

Parsa Tiwari

General information
- Location: Babhnan-Mankapur Road, Parsa Tiwari, Gonda district, Uttar Pradesh; India
- Coordinates: 26°57′20″N 82°27′08″E
- Elevation: 98 metres (322 ft)
- System: Indian Railways station
- Owner: Indian Railways
- Line: Lucknow–Gorakhpur line
- Platforms: 2
- Tracks: 2

Construction
- Structure type: Standard (on ground)
- Parking: Yes

Other information
- Status: Functioning
- Station code: PATI
- Zone(s): North Eastern Railway zone
- Division(s): Lucknow NER
Location
- Location within India Location within Uttar Pradesh

Parsa Tiwari railway station is a railway station on Lucknow–Gorakhpur line under the Lucknow NER railway division of North Eastern Railway zone. Parsa Tiwari Railway Station is situated on NH727G at Parsa Tiwari in Gonda district in the Indian state of Uttar Pradesh.

NH727G connects Harraiya, Babhnan, Swaminarayan, Manakpur and Gonda in the state of Uttar Pradesh. Parsa Tiwari is famous for its mango orchards. Economic activities around the railway station is increasing. Daily essential and amenities are easily available in Parsa Tiwari bazzar like Prathama U.P.Gramin Bank, Indian oil fuel station, Pharmacy, Grocery Shops, Eateries and a lodge (BSNL BTS Lodge) for comfortable stay.

Preceding station	Indian Railways	Following station
Babhnan towards ?	North Eastern Railway zone Lucknow–Gorakhpur section	Babhan Jyotia Halt towards ?
