= Tulsipur =

Town in Uttar Pradesh

- Town
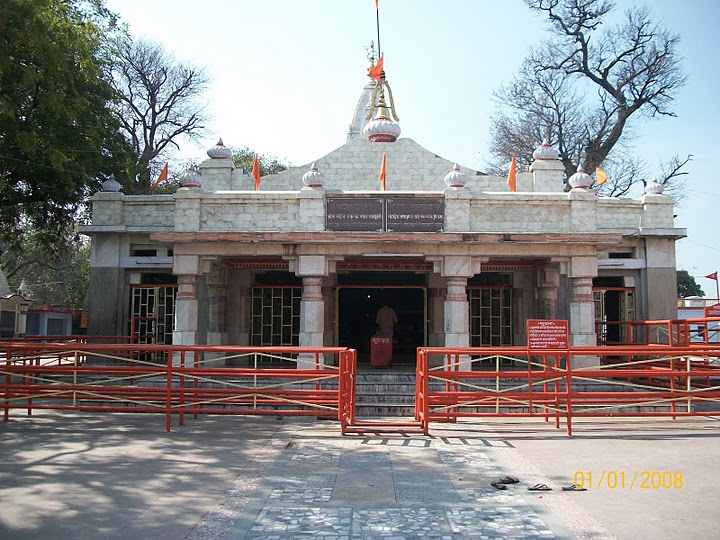
- Devi Patan Temple at Tulsipur India

- Location in India
- Coordinates: 27.55°N 82.42°E
- Country: India
- State: Uttar Pradesh
- District: Balrampur District

Area
  - Total: 25 km^{2} (9.7 sq mi)
- Elevation: 109 m (358 ft)

Population (2011)
  - Total: 24,488
  - Density: 2,000/km^{2} (5,200/sq mi)

Language
  - Official: Hindi
  - Local: Awadhi
- Time zone: UTC+5:30 (IST)
- Telephone code: 05264
- Vehicle registration: UP-47

Tulsipur (Hindi pronunciation: [t̪ʊl.siː.pʊɾ]) is a town and tehsil in the Balrampur district of the Indian state of Uttar Pradesh. The Devi Patan temple, which lies in the city, is a sacred place and pilgrimage site for Hindus. Many pilgrims across the country and from Nepal arrive in the city during Maha Shivratri and a fair is also held during the festival.

== Geography ==
Tulsipur is located near the India-Nepal border on the banks of the River Nakti and River Siria and is 20 km from Koilabas and 190 km from the state capital Lucknow. It is located 28 km from Balrampur District.

== History ==
Before the foundation of Tulsipur, the region is said to have been under the control of the Tharus.

Tulsipur is said to have been founded over 300 years ago by a Kurmi named Tulsi Das. Soon afterwards Tulsipur came under the dominion of the Chauhans of Dang. The Chauhan Rajas of Dang-Tulsipur from then on ruled over a large dominion, which at the dawn of the 19th century included the parganas of Tulsipur, Deokhuri, Sawari, Chilli, Patu, and Pachalla, which were located in Northeastern Awadh and in the Dang and Deukhuri Valleys of modern-day Nepal. After the annexation of Dang by the Gorkhas, the Chauhans of Dang-Tulsipur were exiled to Tulsipur and were left as a rump state in Awadh. Raja Newal Singh of the Chauhans of Dang is said to have taken refuge with the Raja of Balrampur, seeking his aid to help establish his rule in the area in exchange for the Chauhans paying Balrampur an annual tribute.

The Tulsipuris soon afterwards shirked the payment of tribute to the Rajas of Balrampur, which would lead to the birth of a feud that would continue for generations afterwards. This feud manifested itself in the form of frequent fighting between the Rajas of Tulsipur and Balrampur. Tulsipur remained under the Chauhans until the Rebellion of 1857. During the rebellion, Rani Ishwari Devi of Tulsipur, widow of the former Raja Drig Narain Singh of Tulsipur who died in British captivity in Lucknow after being apprehended for refusing to pay revenue from the pargana to the British, joined the rebel forces and sent troops to aid the mutineers at Lucknow, with 500 Tulsipuri soldiers being present in the city by the time of Campbell's relief of Lucknow. After the defeat of the rebel forces, Ishwari Devi fled to Nepal and her estates were confiscated by the British and granted to the Maharaja of Balrampur as a reward for his support for the British cause during the rebellion, marking the end of the long Tulsipuri-Balrampuri rivalry. Tulsipur from then on remained an estate of the Maharajas of Balrampur until after the independence of India, when the Balrampur estate was merged into the tehsils of the Gonda district.

In 1987, Tulsipur was split off as a tehsil unto itself, alongside the tehsils of Mankapur and Colonelganj, from the Gonda Sadar tehsil. In 1997, when Balrampur was created as a district unto itself by a bifurcation of the Gonda district, the tehsil of Tulsipur was allotted to the nascent Balrampur district.

== Demographics ==
At the 2011 Indian Census, Tulsipur had a population of 24,488, of which 12,861 were males and 11,627 were females. The population within the 0-6 year age group was 3,686. The literate population numbered 14,259, which constituted 58.2% of the population with male literacy of 63.8% and female literacy of 52.1%. The effective literacy rate of the population aged 7 and over was 68.5%, of which male literacy rate was 74.9% and female literacy rate was 61.5%. The Scheduled Castes and Scheduled Tribes population was 1,119 and 24 respectively. Tulsipur had 3,776 households in 2011.

== Education ==
Educational Institutes	Affiliated to	Medium of Education
Starwards Public School	ICSE & ISC	English
Adi Shakti Maa Pateshwari Public School	CBSE	English
Sarashwati Sishu Mandir	UP Board	Hindi
Fauzan Public School	Madarsa	Hindi
Kasturba Arya Balika Int College	UP Board	Hindi
Swatantra Bharat Intermediate College	UP Board	Hindi
Basant Lal intermediate College	UP Board	Hindi
Tulsipur Public School	UP Board	Hindi
Atlanta Public School	UP Board	Hindi
Irshavasyam Inter College	UP Board	Hindi
Sunrise Children's Academy	UP Board	Hindi
Children's Academy	UP Board	Hindi
Mahatma Gopal Das Higher Secondary School	UP Board	Hindi
Tulsipur Children City Montessori School	UP Board	Hindi
Cambridge School	UP Board	Hindi
Akhileshwar Tiwari Girls Inter College	UP Board	Hindi
Deep Narayan Singh Degree College	Maa Pateswari University, Balrampur	Hindi & English
DPS Institute Chaipurwa	Maa Pateswari University, Balrampur	Hindi & English
Faisal Degree College	Maa Pateswari University, Balrampur	Hindi & English

== Transport ==
=== Air ===
The nearest domestic airport is Shravasti Airport, which is 50 kilometers away from the town, and the nearest international airport is Chaudhary Charan Singh International Airport in Lucknow, which is 210 kilometers away. Tulsipur does not have its own airport.

=== Railways ===
Through the Tulsipur railway station, Tulsipur now enjoys direct railway links to major Indian cities, including Delhi and Mumbai, significantly boosting connectivity and local economy. The Tulsipur Railway Station is set for a major upgrade to become an Amrit Bharat Railway Station, as part of a government initiative aimed at modernizing railway infrastructure. This transformation is expected to enhance passenger experience and further elevate Tulsipur's status as a crucial transport hub in India.

== In literature ==
Tulsipur, and the surrounding regions, is the eponymous setting of Tulsipur Fair: or Glimpses of Life in Northern India, a late 19th century children's book by Reverend B. H. Badley. The book covers the journey of a missionary and his family to a mela in Tulsipur.

== See also ==
- Ghorahi, Nepal
- Tulsipur, Rapti
- House of Tulsipur - One of 22 Principalities and Taluqs of Oudh
