= Rizwan Zaheer =

Indian politician

Rizwan Zaheer Khan

Member of Parliament, Lok Sabha
- In office 1998–2004
- Preceded by: Satya Deo Singh
- Succeeded by: Brij Bhushan Sharan Singh
- Constituency: Balrampur

Member of Uttar Pradesh Legislative Assembly
- In office 1993–1998
- Preceded by: Kamlesh Kumar
- Succeeded by: Kamlesh Kumar Singh
- In office 1989–1991
- Preceded by: Mangal Deo
- Succeeded by: Kamlesh Kumar Singh
- Constituency: Tulsipur

Personal details
- Born: 1 May 1965 (age 60) Tulsipur, Balrampur, Uttar Pradesh
- Party: Samajwadi Party
- Other political affiliations: Peace Party of India Bahujan Samaj Party Independent
- Children: Zeba Rizwan (daughter)
- Parent: Zahirul Haq Khan (father)
- Occupation: Politician

Rizwan Zaheer is former member of parliament from Balrampur Uttar Pradesh, India and now a senior leader and Muslim face of Samajwadi Party.
