= Brkherabasantpur =

Brkherabasantpur Urf Dayanathpur
- City
- Location in Uttar Pradesh Moradabad (India)
- Coordinates: 28.9073°N 78.6809°E
- Country: India
- State: Uttar Pradesh
- District: Moradabad
- Established: 1950

Government
  - MP: Dr. S. T. Hasan (SP)
  - MLA: BJP

Area
  - Total: 25 km^{2} (9.7 sq mi)
- Elevation: 120 m (390 ft)

Population (2016)
  - Total: 2,300
  - Density: 92/km^{2} (240/sq mi)
- Demonym: Dayanathpur

Languages
  - Official: Hindi, Urdu, Arabic
- Time zone: UTC+5:30 (IST)
- PIN: 244502
- Telephone code: 0591
- Vehicle registration: UP-21
- Website: {{URL|example.com|optional display text}}

Brkherabasantpur is near a distance of 167 km (104 mi) from the national capital, New Delhi and 370 km north-west of the state capital Lucknow.

== History ==
Brkherabasantpur was established in 1950 it was captured by Dayanathpur.

== Demographics ==
Religions in Dayanathpur
Religion	Percent
Hindus	80%
Muslims	20%
Distribution of religions

According to the 2011 census Village Brkherabasantpur has a population of 2300, roughly equal to the nation of Moradabad or the India state of Uttar Pradesh. This gives it a ranking of 26th in India (out of a total of 640). The district has a population density of 1,284 inhabitants per square kilometre (3,330/sq mi) . Its population growth rate over the decade 2001-2011 was 25.25%. In 2011 a new district named Sambhal district is formed with two sub districts of Moradabad district. The rest of Moradabad district have a population of 3126507.The Muslim population in rest of Moradabad district is 1588297. Moradabad has a sex ratio of 903 females for every 1000 males, and a literacy rate of 58.67%.

== Education ==
Schools in Brkherabasantpur, whether using English or Hindi as a medium of instruction, are affiliated to either of the four bodies, Central Board of Secondary Education (C.B.S.E.), Council for the Indian School Certificate Examinations (C.I.S.C.E), University of Cambridge International Examinations and Uttar Pradesh Madhyamik Shiksha Parishad (U.P. Board).

== Religions in Brkherabasantpur ==
- Muslim Kbrishtan Near Talab in Dayanathpur.
- Balmiki Shamshan Ghaat Between kokarpur to Dayanathpur Road.
- Hindusum Chmenda Near Naher in Dayanathpur.
