= Katra, Gonda =

Katra, Gonda Katra
- Town
- Location in Uttar Pradesh, India Katra, Gonda (India)
- Coordinates: 27.52°N 82.02°E
- Country: India
- State: Uttar Pradesh
- District: Gonda
- Elevation: 111 m (364 ft)

Population (2001)
  - Total: 6,430

Languages
  - Official: Hindi
- Time zone: UTC+5:30 (IST)
- Vehicle registration: UP
- Website: up.gov.in

Katra is a town and a nagar panchayat in Gonda district in the Indian state of Uttar Pradesh.

== Geography ==
Katra is located at 27.52°N 82.02°E. It has an average elevation of 111 metres (364 feet).

== Demographics ==
As of 2001 India census, Katra had a population of 6,430. Males constitute 51% of the population and females 49%. Katra has an average literacy rate of 40%, lower than the national average of 59.5%: male literacy is 49%, and female literacy is 31%. In Katra, 22% of the population is under 6 years of age.
