= Balrampur Lok Sabha constituency =

Former constituency in Uttar Pradesh, India

Coordinates: 27.4°N 82.2°E

Balrampur
- Former Lok Sabha constituency

Constituency details
- Country: India
- Region: North India
- State: Uttar Pradesh
- Established: 1957
- Abolished: 2008

Balrampur was a Lok Sabha constituency in northern India. Balrampur is in Uttar Pradesh state . This constituency ceased to exist in 2008 with the implementation of delimitation of the parliamentary constituencies. Most of the area under the erstwhile Balrampur seat now falls under Shravasti Lok Sabha constituency since 2008.

Former PM Atal Bihari Vajpayee contested Lucknow by-election in 1955 and came third. Then in 1957, he contested General Election in three seats. He finished fourth in Mathura, second in Lucknow, and won in Balrampur as his first time representing Lok Sabha. In 1962, he contested Balrampur and Lucknow, and lost in both the seats. In 1967, he contested Balrampur and this time won.

== Members of Parliament ==
Year	Member	Party
1952-57 : Constituency did not exist
1957	Atal Bihari Vajpayee	Bharatiya Jana Sangh
1962	Subhadra Joshi	Indian National Congress
1967	Atal Bihari Vajpayee	Bharatiya Jana Sangh
1971	Chandra Bhal Mani Tiwari	Indian National Congress
1977	Nanaji Deshmukh	Janata Party
1980	Chandra Bhal Mani Tiwari	Indian National Congress (I)
1984	Mahant Deep Narain Van	Indian National Congress
1989	Fasi-ur-Rehman Munnan Khan	Independent
1991	Satya Deo Singh	Bharatiya Janata Party
1996	Satya Deo Singh	Bharatiya Janata Party
1998	Rizwan Zaheer	Samajwadi Party
1999	Rizwan Zaheer	Samajwadi Party
2004	Brij Bhushan Sharan Singh	Bharatiya Janata Party
2008 onwards : Became part of Shravasti Lok Sabha constituency

== Election results ==
=== 1957 Lok Sabha Election ===
- Atal Bihari Vajpayee (BJS) : 118,380 votes
- Hyder Hussain (INC) : 108,568 votes

Uttar Pradesh

=== 1962 Lok Sabha Election ===
- Subhadra Joshi (INC) : 102,260 votes
- Atal Behari Bajpai (sic, he spelled it Atal Bihari Vajpayee himself) (JS) : 100,208

=== 1967 Lok Sabha Election ===
- A. Behari (Atal Bihari Vajpayee) (Bharatiya Jana Sangh) : 142,446 votes
- S. Joshi (INC) : 110,704

=== 2004 Lok Sabha Election ===
- Brij Bhushan Sharan Singh (BJP) 270,941 votes
- Rizwan Zaheer Alias Rijju Bhaya (BSP) : 218,328

== See also ==
- Balrampur district, Uttar Pradesh
- List of former constituencies of the Lok Sabha
