= Bawan Singh =

Indian politician (born 1959)

Member of the Uttar Pradesh Legislative Assembly for Katra Bazar
- Incumbent
- Assumed office 2012
- Preceded by: Baij Nath Dubey
- In office 1995–2002
- Preceded by: Shri Ram Singh
- Succeeded by: Baij Nath Dubey

Personal details
- Born: 6 January 1959 (age 67) Gaddopur village, Gonda, Uttar Pradesh
- Spouse: Geeta Singh (m. 1978)
- Parent: MLA Late Sri Ram Singh (father)
- Education: Bachelor of Science
- Occupation: Politician, Agriculturist

Bawan Singh is an Indian politician and member of the Bharatiya Janata Party. Singh is a 5 time designated senior member of the Uttar Pradesh Legislative Assembly from the Katra Bazar (Assembly constituency) in Gonda district. He is the successor of his father, late 3 time designated senior MLA Shri Ram Singh.

== Early life and education ==
Bawan Singh was born on January 6, 1959 in Gaddopur village, Gonda district. His father's name is Late Sri Ram Singh. He has completed his degree in Bachelor of Science from M.L.K. PG college, Balrampur.

== Political career ==
He started his political career in 1995 (by-election) as an MLA.
