= ITI Limited =

Indian telephone company (founded 1948)

- Native name: आई टी आई लिमिटेड
- Formerly: Indian Telephone Industries Limited (1948–1994)
- Type: Central Public Sector Undertaking
- Traded as: BSE: 523610; NSE: ITI
- Industry: Telecom equipment; Networking equipment; 3D printing
- Founded: 12 October 1948 (Corporate Status: 25 January 1950)
- Headquarters: Bengaluru, India
- Number of locations: 6 manufacturing units in India: Bengaluru (1948); Srinagar (1969) (ITI Skill Development Center); Naini (1971); Raebareli (1973); Palakkad (1976); Mankapur (1983)
- Key people: Jyotiraditya Scindia (Union Minister for Communications); Rajesh Rai (Chairman & Managing Director); Rajeev Srivastava (Director Finance); S Jeyanthi (Director Production); Ramana Babu (Director Marketing)
- Revenue: ₹1,860.73 crore (US$190 million) (2022)
- Net income: ₹121.06 crore (US$13 million) (2022)
- Total assets: ▲₹9,576.95 crore (US$990 million) (2022)
- Total equity: ▲₹2,620.47 crore (US$270 million) (2022)
- Owner: Department of Telecommunications, Ministry of Communications, Government of India
- Number of employees: 1368 (1 April 2025)

ITI Limited, earlier known as Indian Telephone Industries Limited, is a central public sector undertaking in India. It is under the ownership of Department of Telecommunications, Ministry of Communications, Government of India.

== History ==
It was founded in 1948 as a departmental factory, incorporated as a public company in 1950 and today has six manufacturing facilities at Bangalore, Naini, Mankapur, Raebareli, Palakkad and Srinagar which produce a range of switching, transmission, access and subscriber premises equipment. It is headquartered at Bangalore. It has multi-locational electronic assembly and mechanical manufacturing facilities, countrywide marketing and customer support centers and in-house R&D for absorption of technology, indigenous development of products for in-house manufacturing. It produces GSM mobile equipment at its Mankapur and Raebareli facilities. These two facilities supply more than nine million lines per annum to both domestic as well as foreign markets. The Palakkad unit is responsible for data handling with assembly and personalization of smart cards and electronic manufacturing facilities for PCB's, HDPE Pipe, Smart Energy Meters, Micro PC under Smart City Mission etc. It also produces Information and Communication Technology (ICT) equipments such as network management systems, encryption and networking for internet connectivity, and secure communications networks and equipment for the defence. The company has 1368 employees as on 1 April 2025. On 1 October 2020, ITI Limited signed a contract with Defence to implement ₹7,796 crore ASCON Phase-IV project.

== Sources ==
- "Revival of Indian Telephone Industries at Bangalore". Press Information Bureau Government of India. 25 August 2005.
