= Gaura Assembly constituency =

Constituency of the Uttar Pradesh legislative assembly in India

Coordinates: 26.65°N 80.98°E

Gaura
- Constituency No. 301 for the Uttar Pradesh Legislative Assembly

Constituency details
- Country: India
- Region: North India
- State: Uttar Pradesh
- District: Gonda
- Established: 2012
- Total electors: 3,20,821
- Reservation: None

Member of Legislative Assembly
- 18th Uttar Pradesh Legislative Assembly
- Incumbent Prabhat Kumar Verma
- Party: Bharatiya Janata Party
- Elected year: 2022

Gaura is a constituency of the Uttar Pradesh Legislative Assembly, covering the city of Gaura and other parts of Mankapur tehsil in Gonda district of Uttar Pradesh, India. Gaura is one of five assembly constituencies in the Gonda Lok Sabha constituency. Since 2012, this assembly constituency is numbered 301 amongst the 403 constituencies and the first election was held in this constituency was in 2012 after dissolving the Saddulahnagar Assembly constituency. As of 2022, it is represented by Prabhat Kumar Verma of the Bharatiya Janata Party,

== Members of the Legislative Assembly ==
Election	Name	Party
Before 2012, the constituency was known as the Saddullahnagar Nagar Assembly Constituency Dominated by stalwart of Gonda's Politics Ram Pratap Singh who was elected as the MLA 4 Times Straight in a row since 1991 & his late father Dashrath Singh who won the constituency 3 Times from 1974
2012	Kunwar Anand Singh	Samajwadi Party
2017	Prabhat Kumar Verma	Bharatiya Janata Party
2022	Prabhat Kumar Verma	Bharatiya Janata Party

== Election results ==
=== 2027 ===
2027 Uttar Pradesh Legislative Assembly election: Gaura
Party	Candidate	Votes	%	±%
INDIA				
NDA				
BSP				
NOTA	None of the above			
Majority				
Turnout				
gain from		Swing		

=== 2022 ===
2022 Uttar Pradesh Legislative Assembly election: Gaura
Party	Candidate	Votes	%	±%
BJP	Prabhat Kumar Verma	73,545	42.62	+0.83
SP	Sanjay Kumar Vidyarthi	50,571	29.31	+4.74
INC	Ram Pratap Singh (4 Term MLA) Rebel SP Leader	31,589	18.31	+16.73
BSP	Nigar Fatma	11,016	6.38	−15.92
NOTA	None of the above	1,361	0.79	−0.04
Majority		22,974	13.31	−3.91
Turnout		172,557	53.79	−1.81
BJP hold		Swing		

=== 2017 ===
2017 Uttar Pradesh Legislative Assembly election: Gaura
Party	Candidate	Votes	%	±%
BJP	Prabhat Kumar Verma	72,455	41.79	
SP	Ram Pratap Singh	42,600	24.57	
BSP	Abdul Kalam	38,667	22.3	
Independent	Vikram Singh	8,013	4.62	
INC	Tarunendra Chandra Patel	2,746	1.58	
NOTA	None of the above	1,435	0.83	
Majority		29,855	17.22	
Turnout		173,380	55.6	
