= Devi Patan =

Hindu temple and math in Tulsipur, Balrampur district, Uttar Pradesh, India

- देवीपाटन
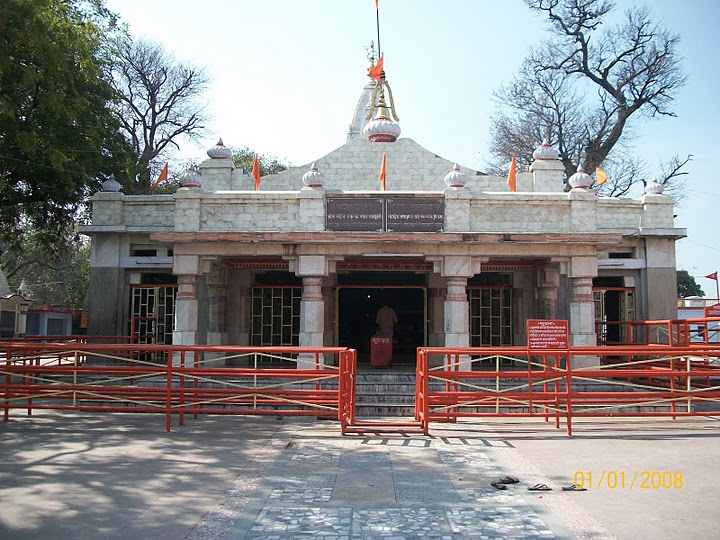
- Devi Patan Temple

- Location within Uttar Pradesh

Religion
- Affiliation: Hinduism
- District: Balrampur
- Governing body: Yogi Mahasabha

Location
- State: Uttar Pradesh
- Country: India
- Coordinates: 27.5365°N 82.3950°E

Website
- https://devipatanmandir.in

Devi Patan (Hindi pronunciation: [d̪eː.ʋiː.pɑː.ʈən]; IAST: Devīpāṭan), also known as the Shri Maa Pateshwari Shaktipeeth Mandir (Hindi pronunciation: [ʃɾiː mɑ̃ː pɑː.ʈeːʃ.ʋə.ɾi ʃək.t̪ɪ.piːʈʰ mən.d̪ɪɾ]; IAST: Śrī Mā̃ Pāṭeśvarī Śaktipīṭh Mandir), is a Nath temple and math located in the Tulsipur tehsil in Balrampur district, Uttar Pradesh. According to Hindu tradition, the left arm of Pateshwari Devi, another name for the goddess Sati, was buried at the site of the current temple while the mourning god Shiva was carrying her body around the universe. Because of this, it is considered by the Natha Sampradaya to be of the fifty-one holy shakti pithas.

== Etymology ==
The word "devi" means "goddess" in both Sanskrit and Hindi. The word "patan", referring to the falling of Pateshwari Devi's arm, derives from the Sanskrit root "pat", meaning "to fall" or "to sink".

== History ==
According to traditional accounts of the Natha Sampradaya, Devi Patan was consecrated by Gorakhnath, the founder of the Sampradaya, and was built by Ratannath, another saint of the Sampradaya who was known for his devotion to Pateshwari Devi. Nath tradition also holds that the temple faced numerous attacks throughout history by invading armies, including those of Ghazi Mian and Aurangzeb, but that the temple was protected by Pateshwari Devi, with her sending swarms of bees to chase the invading armies away.

Georges Weston Briggs describes an alternative traditional account of the temple's history that holds that:

"In the time of Aurangzeb, or in the fifteenth century as some say, the temple was despoiled by a Musalman officer. The avenging of the death of this soldier is the basis of the legend explaining the practice of spilling the blood of suckling pigs on the grave of a Musalman, near the site of the temple of Devi Patan. It is said that two temple guards, Sumer Dhar and Mul Cand, brought the despoiler to his death.”

— Georges Weston Briggs, Gorakhnāth and the Kānphaṭa Yogīs

H. R. Nevill, however, regarded these accounts of Muslim armies attacking Devi Patan to be unlikely, as he regarded the region "from the days of Akbar to the epoch of the Nawab Wazirs of Oudh" to be "beyond the sphere of imperial power".

The currently existing temple at the site was built in the eighteenth century. Devi Patan was patronized by the rajas of Tulsipur until the end of the annexation of the state after the Indian Rebellion of 1857.

== Economic contributions ==
Devi Patan is an important part of the economy of the local region. The temple makes an estimated ₹180 crores in annual revenue from tourism, accounting for approximately 1.5% of the local GDP.

== See also ==
- Tulsipur
- Gorakhnath Math
