= Katra Bazar Assembly constituency =

Constituency of the Uttar Pradesh legislative assembly in India

Coordinates: 27.21°N 81.79°E

Katra Bazar
- Constituency No. 297 for the Uttar Pradesh Legislative Assembly

Constituency details
- Country: India
- Region: North India
- State: Uttar Pradesh
- District: Gonda
- Total electors: 387,612
- Reservation: None

Member of Legislative Assembly
- 18th Uttar Pradesh Legislative Assembly
- Incumbent Bawan Singh
- Party: Bharatiya Janta Party
- Elected year: 2022

Katra Bazar is a constituency of the Uttar Pradesh Legislative Assembly covering the city of Katra Bazar in the Gonda district of Uttar Pradesh, India. It is one of five assembly constituencies in the Kaiserganj Lok Sabha constituency.

== Members of the Legislative Assembly ==
Year	Member	Party
1967	Ramdev Mishra	Bharatiya Jana Sangh
1969	Shri Ram Singh	Bharatiya Jana Sangh
1974	Deep Narayan Pandey	Indian National Congress
1977	Deep Narayan Pandey	Janata Party
1980	Murlidhar Munim	Indian National Congress (I)
1985	Fasi-ur-Rehman Munnan Khan	Lok Dal
1989	Murlidhar Munim	Indian National Congress
1991	Shri Ram Singh	Bharatiya Janata Party
1993	Shri Ram Singh	Bharatiya Janata Party
1995^	Bawan Singh	Bharatiya Janata Party
1996	Bawan Singh	Bharatiya Janata Party
2002	Baij Nath Dubey	Samajwadi Party
2007	Baij Nath Dubey	Samajwadi Party
2012	Bawan Singh	Bharatiya Janata Party
2017	Bawan Singh	Bharatiya Janata Party
2022	Bawan Singh	Bharatiya Janata Party

^denotes by-poll

== Election results ==
=== 2027 ===
2027 Uttar Pradesh Legislative Assembly election: Katra Bazar
Party	Candidate	Votes	%	±%
INDIA				
NDA				
BSP				
NOTA	None of the above			
Majority				
Turnout				
gain from		Swing		

=== 2022 ===
2022 Uttar Pradesh Legislative Assembly election: Katra Bazar
Party	Candidate	Votes	%	±%
BJP	Bawan Singh	112,291	47.86	+6.29
SP	Baijnath Dubey	93,834	39.99	+12.33
BSP	Vinod Shukla	18,218	7.76	−17.49
INC	Tahir Vano	2,719	1.16	
NOTA	None of the above	2,004	0.85	−0.53
Majority		18,457	7.87	−6.04
Turnout		234,642	60.54	−0.63
BJP hold		Swing		

=== 2017 ===
2017 Uttar Pradesh Legislative Assembly election: Katra Bazar
Party	Candidate	Votes	%	±%
BJP	Bawan Singh	92,095	41.57	
SP	Baijnath	61,284	27.66	
BSP	Masood Aalam Khan	55,947	25.25	
Independent	Amar Singh	3,092	1.4	
NOTA	None of the above	3,014	1.38	
Majority		30,811	13.91	
Turnout		221,535	61.17	
BJP hold		Swing		
