= Anand Singh (Uttar Pradesh politician) =

Indian politician (1939–2025)

Raja Anand Singh
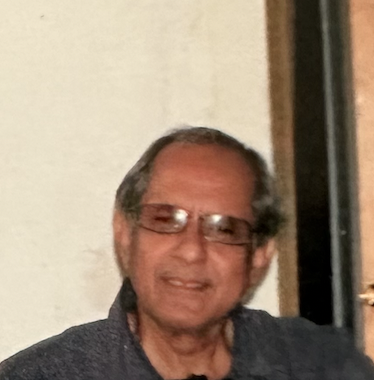

Minister of Agriculture, Government of Uttar Pradesh
- In office 15 March 2012 – 9 March 2014
- Chief Minister: Akhilesh Yadav
- In office From November 1969

Member of Parliament, Lok Sabha
- In office 1980–1991
- Preceded by: Satya Deo Singh
- Succeeded by: Brij Bhushan Sharan Singh
- Constituency: Gonda
- In office 1971–1977
- Preceded by: Sucheta Kriplani
- Succeeded by: Satya Deo Singh
- Constituency: Gonda

Member of Uttar Pradesh legislative assembly
- In office 2012–2017
- Succeeded by: Prabhat Kumar Verma
- Constituency: Gaura
- In office 1964 – 26 March 1971
- Preceded by: Raja Raghvendra Pratap Singh
- Succeeded by: Ram Garib
- Constituency: Mankapur

Personal details
- Born: 4 January 1939 Mankapur, United Provinces, British India
- Died: 6 July 2025 (aged 86) Lucknow, Uttar Pradesh, India
- Party: Samajwadi Party
- Other political affiliations: Indian National Congress; Congress (O)
- Spouse: Veena Singh (m. 1960)
- Children: 4, including Kirti Vardhan Singh
- Education: Colvin College, Lucknow; Allahabad Agricultural Institute
- Occupation: Politician, agriculturist

Raja of Mankapur
- Predecessor: Raja Raghvendra Pratap Singh
- Titular reign: 1964 – 2025

Raja Anand Singh (4 January 1939 – 6 July 2025) was an Indian politician from Uttar Pradesh. He was elected four times to the Lok Sabha from the Gonda constituency, sitting in the 5th, 7th, 8th and 9th Lok Sabhas, and served as a member of the Uttar Pradesh Legislative Assembly from 1964 to 1971 and again from 2012 to 2017. He was twice the state's Minister of Agriculture, first from November 1969 and again in the Akhilesh Yadav ministry from 2012 to 2014. A member of the former royal family of Mankapur, he was the father of Union Minister of State Kirti Vardhan Singh.

== Early life and family ==
Singh was born on 4 January 1939 at Mankapur in Gonda district, the son of Raja Raghvendra Pratap Singh of Mankapur and the grandson of Raja Raghuraj Singh. His father was a long-serving member of the state legislature. He was educated at Colvin College in Lucknow and at the Allahabad Agricultural Institute, where he took a science degree in agriculture.

On 19 February 1960 he married Veena Singh, the daughter of former Rajya Sabha member Bindumati Devi. The couple had one son and three daughters.

== Political career ==
=== State legislature and first term as minister ===
Singh became president of the Gonda District Congress Committee in 1964 and entered the Uttar Pradesh Legislative Assembly the same year from Mankapur, the seat his father had held. He was re-elected on the Indian National Congress ticket in 1967 and 1969, and took charge as Minister of Agriculture in November 1969, during the chief ministership of Chandra Bhanu Gupta. The Lok Sabha's record of his career describes the post as being of cabinet rank. He also served for a year as treasurer of the party's Uttar Pradesh unit.

=== Parliament ===
After the Congress split of 1969, Singh stood at the 1971 general election in Gonda as the candidate of the Congress (O), the "Syndicate" wing of the party. He defeated Devendra Pratap Singh of Indira Gandhi's Congress, who was his paternal uncle, by 631 votes, and resigned his assembly seat on 26 March 1971.

Anand Singh with Mulayam Singh Yadav in Gonda

He lost the seat in 1977, standing for the Congress, to Satya Deo Singh of the Bharatiya Lok Dal. He regained it in 1980 and held it in 1984 and 1989, before losing in 1991 to Brij Bhushan Sharan Singh of the Bharatiya Janata Party (BJP). He contested Gonda once more in 1996, this time for the Samajwadi Party, and lost to Ketki Devi Singh of the BJP. In Parliament he served on several committees, including the Committee on Petitions and the consultative committee of the Ministry of Environment and Forests in 1990, and was a member of Indian delegations to the Netherlands and to the United Nations.

=== Minister of Agriculture, 2012–2014 ===
Singh returned to the state assembly at the 2012 election, winning Gaura for the Samajwadi Party. He was sworn in as a cabinet minister in the government of Chief Minister Akhilesh Yadav on 15 March 2012 and given the agriculture portfolio.

Anand Singh on field as Minister of Agriculture of Uttar Pradesh in 2012

As minister, Singh argued for wider mechanisation of farming. In 2013 he said he had asked his department to organise farmers into small clusters that could hire machinery at subsidised rates, and that the state planned separate electricity feeders dedicated to irrigation; he also said he expected a record paddy harvest that year. The same report quoted opposition legislators disputing the government's record: Hriday Narayan Dikshit of the BJP said the state had fallen well short of its wheat procurement target, leaving farmers to sell to private traders, while Congress legislator Akhilesh Pratap Singh said rural power shortages had doubled farmers' costs. Later that year he said the state was encouraging guar cultivation to raise farm incomes, wanted private firms to build warehouses, and was preparing a plan to promote the hiring of tractors and other implements.

In 2013 the minister of state in his department, Rajiv Kumar Singh, wrote to the Chief Minister alleging that seed had been bought through the state seed corporation at inflated rates. Anand Singh denied any irregularity and said he was willing to face an inquiry; opposition parties demanded one. The Chief Minister subsequently withdrew several departments from the junior minister.

The same year he drew criticism for directing that no inquiry into complaints against officials of his department be opened without his prior approval. The order followed a departmental inquiry that had uncovered a scam of about Rs 59 crore, and it was opposed within the department, including by his deputy, Manoj Pandey. Singh defended the order on the ground that complaints had to be verified as genuine before action was taken against an official.

Yadav dismissed him from the cabinet on 9 March 2014, days after his son Kirti Vardhan Singh had left the Samajwadi Party for the BJP and publicly criticised the party's leadership. The government gave no official reason. Singh said he had played no part in his son's decision or his remarks. The Chief Minister took charge of agriculture himself, and the portfolio went to Vinod Kumar Singh in November 2015. Singh remained a legislator until the end of the assembly's term in 2017 and then retired from active politics.

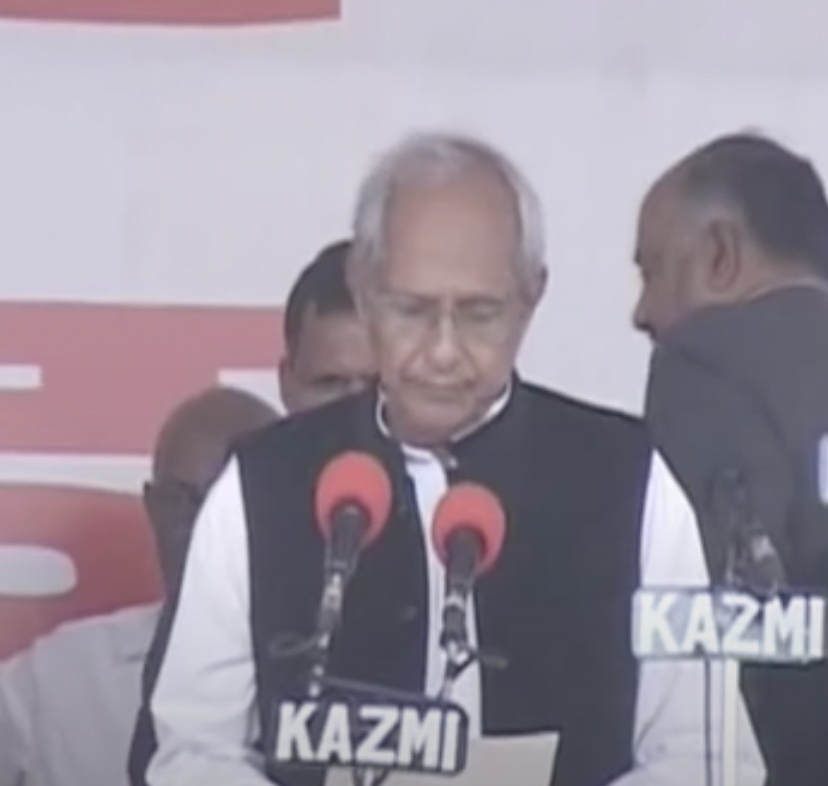
Raja Anand Singh taking oath as Minister in the UP Govt.

=== Later years ===
In December 2021, ahead of the 2022 assembly election, Singh wrote to BJP president J. P. Nadda asking the party not to renominate the sitting Gaura legislator, Prabhat Verma, whom he accused of harassing constituents and of corruption. He said that if the party did not field another candidate he would contest the seat himself. Brij Bhushan Sharan Singh, by then the BJP member of Parliament for Kaiserganj and a rival of three decades' standing, wrote to Nadda in reply, accusing Singh of acting to benefit the Samajwadi Party and attacking his record in office.

== Electoral history ==
Elections contested by Anand Singh
Year	House	Constituency	Party	Result	Votes	Main opponent	Opponent's votes	Margin
1964 (by-election)	Uttar Pradesh Legislative Assembly	Mankapur	Indian National Congress	Won	—	—	—	—
1967	Uttar Pradesh Legislative Assembly	Mankapur	Indian National Congress	Won	41,510	S. Nath (Swatantra Party)	8,819	32,691
1969	Uttar Pradesh Legislative Assembly	Mankapur	Indian National Congress	Won	40,225	Avadhpati Singh (Bharatiya Jana Sangh)	6,956	33,269
1971	Lok Sabha	Gonda	Congress (O)	Won	100,180	Devendra Pratap Singh (Congress)	99,549	631
1977	Lok Sabha	Gonda	Indian National Congress	Lost	86,690	Satya Deo Singh (Bharatiya Lok Dal)	157,963	71,273
1980	Lok Sabha	Gonda	Congress (I)	Won	125,196	Kaushalendra Dutt (Janata Party (Secular))	52,270	72,926
1984	Lok Sabha	Gonda	Indian National Congress	Won	260,112	Deep Narain Pandey (Lok Dal)	94,136	165,976
1989	Lok Sabha	Gonda	Indian National Congress	Won	271,892	Fazlul Bari (Janata Dal)	107,742	164,150
1991	Lok Sabha	Gonda	Indian National Congress	Lost	114,131	Brij Bhushan Sharan Singh (BJP)	217,115	102,984
1996	Lok Sabha	Gonda	Samajwadi Party	Lost	178,456	Ketki Devi Singh (BJP)	245,605	67,149
2012	Uttar Pradesh Legislative Assembly	Gaura	Samajwadi Party	Won	42,773	Abdul Kalam Malik (Indian National Congress)	35,678	7,095

Sources: Election Commission of India statistical reports on the Uttar Pradesh assembly elections of 1967 and 1969; Lok Sabha results for Gonda, 1971–1996; 2012 assembly result.

== Other roles and interests ==
Singh chaired the district cane committee in Gonda and was vice-chairman of the Uttar Pradesh Cane Federation, an office he held three times between 1965 and 1989. He was also president of the Bhatkhande Music University in Lucknow, chairman of the British India Association of Uttar Pradesh, the body of the former landholders of Awadh, and president of the Raghvendra Rural Development and Research Organisation (RRDRO).

Anand Singh as the Chairman of the BIA parent organisation of Colvin College ; at a Colvin Event

An agriculturist by profession, he took a particular interest in sugarcane management, horticulture and new farming methods, and was involved in running schools and other educational institutions in Uttar Pradesh. He played cricket, tennis and badminton and was a keen hunter in his youth; his other pastimes included photography, reading and water sports.

== Death ==
Singh died in Lucknow on the night of 6 July 2025, aged 86, after his health deteriorated suddenly at home. His body was brought to Mankapur Kot, the family seat, the next morning and lay there for public viewing before he was cremated with state honours, his son lighting the pyre.

Chief Minister Yogi Adityanath and Samajwadi Party president Akhilesh Yadav paid tribute on the day of the funeral, and Deputy Chief Minister Brajesh Pathak and the state BJP president, Bhupendra Singh Chaudhary, called on the family at Mankapur. Adityanath travelled to Mankapur on 11 July to offer his condolences in person, followed the next day by Deputy Chief Minister Keshav Prasad Maurya. Other visitors in the following days included Sanjay Singh, the former member of Parliament for Amethi, and Ujjwal Raman Singh, the member for Prayagraj. Raghuraj Pratap Singh, the legislator for Kunda, also came to Mankapur to pay his respects.

In place of the customary feast on the thirteenth day after his death, the family held a memorial meeting at Mankapur Kot on 18 July 2025 and pledged to fund the weddings of girls from poor families in his memory. Those attending included Union ministers of state Jitin Prasada and Kamlesh Paswan, Uttar Pradesh transport minister Daya Shankar Singh, the Leader of the Opposition in the state assembly, Mata Prasad Pandey, and Jagdambika Pal, the member of Parliament for Domariyaganj. At the same gathering Kirti Vardhan Singh was formally recognised as head of the Mankapur family.
