= Colonelganj =

- Town
- Location in Uttar Pradesh, India Colonelganj (India)
- Coordinates: 27.13°N 81.7°E
- Country: India
- State: Uttar Pradesh
- District: Gonda
- Named for: Colonel Fooks

Government
  - MLA: Kunwar Ajay Pratap Singh
- Elevation: 119 m (390 ft)

Population (2001)
  - Total: 24,163

Languages
  - Official: Hindi
- Time zone: UTC+5:30 (IST)
- Postal code: 271502
- Area code: 0-5261
- Vehicle registration: UP
- Website: up.gov.in

Colonelganj is a town and a municipal board in Gonda district in the state of Uttar Pradesh, India. It is also the seat of an eponymous tehsil.

== Geography and agriculture ==
Colonelganj is located at 27.07°N 81.402°E. It has an average elevation of 119 metres (390 feet). It has an ideal climate for producing popcorn, of which Colonelganj has the most famous in the region. In winter seasons, the area has a high rate of cabbage production.

The city is situated on the bank of the Saryu River. In the range of Tahseel the area of sangam has two rivers, the Ghaghara and the Saryu, are situated. Saryu is a small river and is a tributary of Ghaghara. The Saryu River joins the Ghaghara at a place called Paska, but is called Saryu again when in Ayodhya in Faizabad district because of its religious links.

Colonelganj is connected by branch roads to Paraspur, Tarabganj, Nawabganj to the southeast and to Katra and Balrampur to the northeast. National Highway 330B connects the town to Jarwal to the west and Gonda to the east, while State Highway 13 connects the town to Bahraich to the North.

== Name and history ==
Originally, Colonelganj was a small village known as Sakrora. In 1780, the Nawab of the Oudh State dispatched a British force, led by one Major Byng, to the area to subdue local rulers across the Gogra and bring them back under the nazims of Gonda and Bahraich. The British made an encampment at Sakrora and maintained it for 8 years. A few years later, in 1802, another British force under one Colonel Fooks reoccupied the old encampment at Sakrora. When a bazaar sprang up, it was named Colonelganj in his honour. The new encampment at Colonelganj lasted until the Indian Rebellion of 1857, when it was abandoned.

Writing in 1877, William Charles Benett described Colonelganj as a rapidly growing centre of trade, owing to its central location between Gonda, Bahraich, and Balrampur. The trade dealt almost exclusively in the export of grain (mainly rice) and oil-seeds (mustard and alsi); Colonelganj served as a depot where those goods were brought from the surrounding countryside before being exported. Imports were far less in amount than exports; imports included salt from Kanpur, copper vessels from Bhagwantnagar and Mirzapur, and cotton. There were two bazaars per week in Colonelganj, on Mondays and Tuesdays.

The population of Colonelganj in 1877, according to Benett, was 5,898, of whom 4,730 were Hindu. The town had a few temples dedicated to Mahadev and Krishna, as well as two mosques and a caravanserai. There was a thana, a dispensary, and a boys' school, which taught its 106 students in English, Urdu, and Hindi.

== Administration and politics ==
This is the second largest town in Gonda district and has its own Nagar Palika Parishad. Elections are held to elect the chairman. In the 2012 election, Shamim Akhtar Achchhan won for the third time from this seat. In 2017, Smt. Razia Khatoon, wife of Shamim Akhtar Achchhan, (women reserved seat) won for a fourth time from this seat. In the 2014 General Election for Members of Parliament, Shri Brij Bhushan Sharan Singh (Bhartiya Janta Party) was elected as Member of Parliament from Kaiserganj Constituency as colonelganj comes in this constituency. In the 2017 General Election of Assembly, Shri Ajay Pratap Singh urf Lalla Bhaiya (Bhartiya Janta Party) was elected and made a member of the legislative assembly of Uttar Pradesh from Colonelganj. constituency.

== Hospital facilities and care ==
Colonelganj has its own CHC government hospital with some good facilities.

Dr. Sanwal Prasad Singh (born 30 July 1949) was the first Dental Hygienist from King George Medical College Reg. No. 382, and served in Colonelganj.

== Transport ==
Colonelganj railway station is a railway station is situated on Lucknow–Gorakhpur line under the Lucknow NER railway division of North Eastern Railway zone.

== Demographics ==
At the 2001 India census, Colonelganj had a population of 24,163. Males constituted 53% of the population and females 47%. Colonelganj has an average literacy rate of 88%, higher than the national average of 59.5%: male literacy is 53% and female literacy is 42%. In Colonelganj, 17% of the population is under 6 years of age.
