= Colonelganj Assembly constituency =

Assembly constituency in Uttar Pradesh

Coordinates: 27.13°N 81.70°E

Colonelganj
- Constituency No. 298 for the Uttar Pradesh Legislative Assembly

Constituency details
- Country: India
- Region: North India
- State: Uttar Pradesh
- District: Gonda
- Total electors: 3,30,403
- Reservation: None

Member of Legislative Assembly
- 18th Uttar Pradesh Legislative Assembly
- Incumbent Ajay Kumar Singh
- Party: Bharatiya Janta Party
- Elected year: 2022

Colonelganj is a constituency of the Uttar Pradesh Legislative Assembly covering the town of Colonelganj in the Gonda district of Uttar Pradesh, India.

Colonelganj is one of five assembly constituencies in the Kaiserganj Lok Sabha constituency. Since 2008, this assembly constituency is numbered 298 amongst 403 constituencies.

== Members of the Legislative Assembly ==
Year	Member	Party
1967	Kunwar Madan Mohan Singh	Independent politician
1969	Bhagelu Singh	Samyukta Socialist Party
1974	Raghuraj Singh	Indian National Congress
1977	Triveni Singh	Janata Party
1980	Umeshwar Pratap Singh	Indian National Congress (I)
1985	Umeshwar Pratap Singh	Indian National Congress
1989	Kunwar Ajay Pratap Singh alias Lalla Bhaiya	Independent politician
1991	Kunwar Ajay Pratap Singh alias Lalla Bhaiya	Bharatiya Janata Party
1993	Kunwar Ajay Pratap Singh alias Lalla Bhaiya	Bharatiya Janata Party
1996	Kunwar Ajay Pratap Singh alias Lalla Bhaiya	Bharatiya Janata Party
2002	Yogesh Pratap Singh	Bahujan Samaj Party
2007	Kunwar Ajay Pratap Singh alias Lalla Bhaiya	Indian National Congress
2008^	Kunwari Brij Singh	Bahujan Samaj Party
2012	Yogesh Pratap Singh	Samajwadi Party
2017	Kunwar Ajay Pratap Singh alias Lalla Bhaiya	Bharatiya Janata Party
2022	Ajay Kumar Singh	Bharatiya Janata Party

^denotes by-poll

== Election results ==
=== 2027 ===
2027 Uttar Pradesh Legislative Assembly election: Colonelganj
Party	Candidate	Votes	%	±%
INDIA				
NDA				
BSP				
NOTA	None of the above			
Majority				
Turnout				
gain from		Swing		

=== 2022 ===
2022 Uttar Pradesh Legislative Assembly election: Colonelganj
Party	Candidate	Votes	%	±%
BJP	Ajay Kumar Singh	108,109	55.8	+10.39
SP	Yogesh Pratap Singh	72,637	37.49	+7.64
BSP	Ranjeet	3,764	1.94	−16.28
INC	Triloki Nath Tiwari	3,756	1.94	
NOTA	None of the above	2,399	1.24	−0.29
Majority		35,472	18.31	+2.75
Turnout		193,761	58.64	+0.69
BJP hold		Swing		

=== 2017 ===
Bharatiya Janata Party candidate Ajay Pratap Singh alias Lalla Bhaiya won in the Assembly election of 2017 Uttar Pradesh Legislative Elections defeating Samajwadi Party candidate Yogesh Pratap Singh by a margin of 28,405 votes.

2017 Uttar Pradesh Legislative Assembly election: Colonelganj
Party	Candidate	Votes	%	±%
BJP	Ajay Pratap Singh	82,867	45.41	
SP	Yogesh Pratap Singh	54,462	29.85	
BSP	Santosh Kumar Tiwari	33,241	18.22	
NOTA	None of the above	2,748	1.53	
Majority		28,405	15.56	
Turnout		182,468	57.95	
