= Tulsipur State =

Princely state of the British Raj

- Feudatory Kingdom
- 16th century–1859
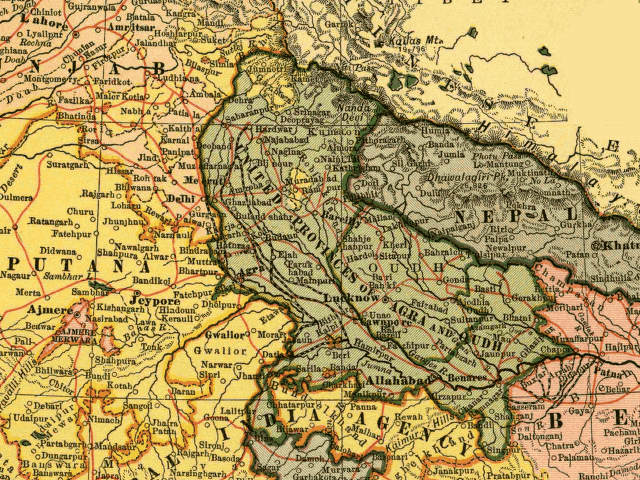
- Map showing the United Provinces of Agra and Oudh
- Capital: Tulsipur
- Population
  - 1881: 132,175
- History
  - Estate of the Mughal Empire: 16th century
  - Annexation by British India: 1859
Preceded by	Succeeded by
Mughal Empire; Kingdom of Nepal	North-Western Provinces; Kingdom of Nepal
- Today part of: India; Nepal

Tulsipur State was a small kingdom in the Awadh region of India that became the United Provinces of Agra and Oudh under the British Raj. Tulsipur also extended north beyond Dundwa Range of the Siwaliks to include the Dang and Deukhuri Valleys later part of the Kingdom of Nepal. It was one of the areas traditionally inhabited by the Tharu people.

The Tulsipur kingdom was about 150 by 150 miles. It bordered Salyan Rajya (Nepal) and Pyuthan (Nepal) in the north, Balarampur Principality (India) in the south, Madi Khola (Nepal) and Arnala River (Basti, India) in the east and Bahraich (India) in the west.

Until annexation in 1786 the Tulsipur kingdom counted as one of the Baise (22) confederated principalities centered in the Hill Region.

== History ==
Tradition traces the origins of Tulsipur to the legendary Sravasti Kingdom.

The Rajas of Tulsipur-Dang belonged to the Chauhan Rajput clan with the title Thakuri. From Chaughera (near Ghorahi, Dang) they ruled the Dang and Deukhuri Valleys as well as territories around Tulsipur State south of the Siwaliks, now in India.

During the unification of Nepal, the part in the Siwaliks and the valleys to the north were ceded to Nepal. Remaining lands became known as Tulsipur State, a feudatory state of Oudh in India.

The ruling family engaged in internecine warfare for control of the estate during the 1850s and, in 1856, an armed force was sent by the British East India Company (EIC) to put pressure on the raja. He was one of several talukdars who had been refusing to pass on the land revenues exacted by him as agent for the EIC, and the EIC was now seeking not only current revenues but also the arrears. During the Indian Rebellion of 1857, 500 of the talukdar's men had formed a part of the rebel force at the Siege of Lucknow and the Rani of Tulsipur (Ishwari Devi) was a prominent anti-establishment figure. After the rebellion, Tulsipur State was annexed by the British Raj, becoming part of the North-Western Provinces and Oudh, one of the Provinces of British India.

Chauhan Sirdar Hardayal Singh of the Tulsipur dynasty.

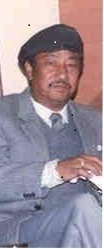
49th Chauhan (claimant for the legally abolished title) Thakuri Prachanda Singh of Tulsipur.

== See also ==
- List of princely states of British India (alphabetical)
