= Satya Deo Singh =

Indian politician (1945–2020)

Member of Parliament, Lok Sabha
- In office 1991–1998
- Preceded by: Fasi-ur-Rehman Munnan Khan
- Succeeded by: Rizwan Zaheer
- Constituency: Balrampur
- In office 1977–1980
- Preceded by: Anand Singh
- Succeeded by: Anand Singh
- Constituency: Gonda

2nd President of Bharatiya Janata Yuva Morcha
- In office 1980–1986
- Preceded by: Kalraj Mishra
- Succeeded by: Pramod Mahajan

Personal details
- Born: 27 February 1945 Calcutta, Bengal Province, British India
- Died: 17 December 2020 (aged 75) Gurugram, Haryana, India
- Party: Bharatiya Janata Party
- Spouse: Late Saroj Rani
- Children: 5
- Education: B.Sc.
- Alma mater: Bareilly College
- Profession: Agriculturist and Businessman

Satya Deo Singh (27 February 1945 – 17 December 2020) was an Indian politician.

== Personal life ==
Singh is married to Saroj Rani, with whom he has two sons and three daughters. The youngest son, Vaibhav Singh, is national general secretary of BJYM.

== Career ==
Satya Deo Singh started his political career with Jansangh. He was first elected to Lok Sabha in 1977. As Jansangh morphed into Bhartiya Janata Party, he became National President of Bhartiya Janata Yuva Morcha in 1980. He was reelected to Lok Sabha in 1991 and 1996.

== Death ==
He died from a cardiac arrest and COVID-19 during the COVID-19 pandemic in India.
