= Fasi-ur-Rehman Munnan Khan =

Indian politician (1945–2009)

Fasih-ur-Rehman Munnan Khan

Member of Uttar Pradesh Legislative Assembly(MLA)
- In office 1985–1989
- Preceded by: Murlidhar Muneem
- Succeeded by: Murlidhar Muneem
- Constituency: Katra Bazar Assembly constituency

Member of Parliament(MP), Lok Sabha
- In office 1989–1991
- Preceded by: Mahant Deep Narain
- Succeeded by: Satya Deo Singh
- Constituency: Balrampur

Personal details
- Born: 7 January 1945 Haldharmau village, Gonda, Uttar Pradesh, British India
- Died: 25 June 2009 Lucknow, Uttar Pradesh
- Party: Independent
- Spouse: Zubaida Begum
- Children: 5 sons, 2 daughters
- Education: High School
- Occupation: Politician, Agriculture, Trader
- Profession: Social worker, Writer

Fasih-ur-Rehman Munnan Khan was an Indian politician, social worker, and social activist who was also MP from Balrampur, Uttar Pradesh in 9th Lok Sabha.

== History ==
He was born on 7 January 1945 in Gonda, Uttar Pradesh and popularly known as Munnan Khan. His son's name is Muhammad Kasim Khan. H

== Career ==
He served as member of parliament in the years of 1985–89, MLA from Katra Bazar Assembly constituency in 1985 (Lokdal), and member of consultative committee of ministry of labour and welfare in 1990 CE. He also wrote a book titled Ae-lane Jung (a book on public problem).
