= Uttar Pradesh State Board of High School and Intermediate Education =

State secondary education board in India

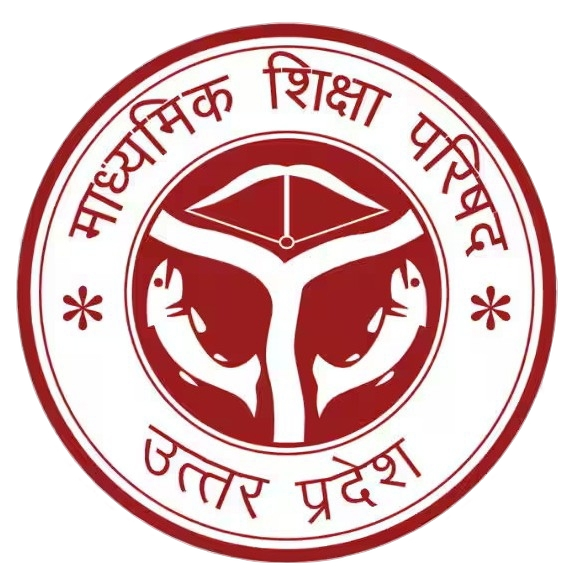
- State Education Board of Uttar Pradesh
- Abbreviation: UPMSP
- Nickname: Uttar Pradesh Board
- Established: 1921; 105 years ago
- Type: State Government Board of Education
- Legal status: Active
- Headquarters: Prayagraj, Uttar Pradesh, India
- Region served: Uttar Pradesh
- Official language: Hindi; English
- Minister of Secondary Education: Gulabo Devi
- Chief Secretary: Deepak Kumar, IAS
- Secretary: Mr. Bhagwati Singh
- Parent organisation: Department of Secondary Education, Uttar Pradesh Government
- Staff: 1,480+ (2025)
- Students: Approx 60 Lakhs
- Website: https://upmsp.edu.in

The Uttar Pradesh State Board of High School and Intermediate Education (UPMSP) is the Uttar Pradesh autonomous examining authority for the Standard 10th and 12th examination. It is headquartered in Prayagraj. The examinations for the 10th and 12th standards are called the High School and Intermediate examinations, respectively. These examinations are conducted annually and simultaneously all over the state of Uttar Pradesh. The Board conducts the examinations and prepares the results for nearly 64,00,000 students. More than 29,208 secondary schools are recognized by the U.P. Board of High School and Intermediate Education.

== History ==
The Board was set up in 1921 at Prayagraj by an act of the United Provinces Legislative Council. It conducted its first examination in 1923. This Board initially adopted the 10+2 system of examination. The first public examination after 10 years education is High School Examination and after the 10+2 stage, is the Intermediate Examination. Prior to 1923, University of Allahbad was the examining body.

Four Regional Offices were established at Meerut (1973), Varanasi (1978), Bareilly (1981) and Prayagraj (1987) under the control of Regional Secretaries. A Regional Office at Ramnagar (Nainital district) was separated from U. P. Board due to the creation of Uttaranchal or Uttarakhand as a new state w.e.f. 08-11-2000.

== Functions ==
- Grant recognition to aspiring schools
- Prescribe courses and text books for High school and Intermediate level
- Conduct High school and Intermediate examinations
- Provide equivalence to the examinations conducted by other Boards

== Structure ==
The Director of Education of the State is Ex-Officio Chairman of the Board. The Secretary of the Board is appointed by the State Government. Eight people are Ex-officio members. Primary sub-committees (45 total):

- Curriculum committee
- Examination Committee
- Result Committee
- Recognition Committee
- Finance Committee
