= Mankapur Junction railway station =

Railway station in Uttar Pradesh, India

Mankapur Junction
- Indian Railways logo

General information
- Location: Mankapur, Uttar Pradesh; India
- Coordinates: 27°02′23″N 82°13′37″E
- Elevation: 104 metres (341 ft)
- System: Indian Railways junction station
- Owner: Indian Railways
- Operator: North Eastern Railway
- Lines: Lucknow–Gorakhpur line; Mankapur–Ayodhya line
- Platforms: 5
- Tracks: 8

Construction
- Structure type: At grade
- Parking: Yes

Other information
- Status: Functioning
- Station code: MUR
- Zone(s): North Eastern Railway
- Division(s): Lucknow NER

History
- Opened: 1930
Location

Mankapur Junction railway station is located in Mankapur town of Gonda district, Uttar Pradesh. It serves Mankapur town. Its code is MUR. It has five platforms. Kushinagar Exp, Rapti Sagar Sperfast Express, Intercity, Prayagraj Sangam, Durg Express, Saryu Express, Varanasi Baharaich Intercity, Awadh Express, Chhapra Kachehri Gomti Nagar, Satyagrah Express and many more trains halt here.
