= Nawabganj, Gonda =

Nawabganj, Gonda Nawabganj Nandani Nagar Nawabganj
- Town
- Nickname: NBJ
- Location in Uttar Pradesh, India Nawabganj, Gonda (India)
- Coordinates: 26.87°N 82.13°E
- Country: India
- State: Uttar Pradesh
- District: Gonda
  - Rank: 1
- Elevation: 93 m (305 ft)

Population (2011)
  - Total: 17,314

Languages
  - Official: Hindi, Awadhi
- Time zone: UTC+5:30 (IST)
- Postal code: 271303
- Vehicle registration: UP42-CA(Ayodhya RTO), UP43-BD(Gonda RTO)
- Website: up.gov.in

Nawabganj is a city and a Nagar Palika Parishad in Gonda district in the Indian state of Uttar Pradesh. It is under Ayodhya Development Authority (ADA) and is divided into 25 wards for which elections are held every 5 years.

== Geography ==
Nawabganj is located at 26.87°N 82.13°E. It has an average elevation of 93 metres (305 feet).

== Demographics ==
As of 2011 India census, Nawabganj had a population of 17314. Males constitute 8986 of the population and females 8328. Nawabganj has an average literacy rate of 80.56%, higher than the national average of 59.5%: male literacy is 85.61%, and female literacy is 75.17%. In Nawabganj, 12.09% of the population is under 6 years of age.

Nawabganj Nagar Palika Parishad has total administration over 2,774 houses to which it supplies basic amenities like water and sewerage. It is also authorize to build roads within Nagar Palika Parishad limits and impose taxes on properties coming under its jurisdiction.

== Religion ==
Nawabganj religion data 2011 shows that of 17314 people 61.59% population practice Hinduism while 36.89% population practice Islam as their religion.

There are also small groups of other minorities groups also living in Nawabganj.

Sikhs:0.94%, Christian:0.46%, Others:0.02%
