= Devipatan division =

Administrative division of Uttar Pradesh, India

Coordinates: 27.1333°N 81.9637°E

Devipatan division

Devipatan division is one of the 18 administrative geographical units (i.e. division) of the northern Indian state of Uttar Pradesh. The division derives its name from the Devi Patan temple located in the tehsil of Tulsipur, which is dedicated to Maa Pateshwari Devi. Currently (As of 2005), the division consists of 4 districts, of which Gonda city is the divisional headquarters:-

- Gonda
- Bahraich
- Shravasti
- Balrampur

== History ==
Devipatan division was established on 21 November 1997.
