= Maa Pateswari University =

State public university in Balrampur, Uttar Pradesh, India

- माँ पाटेश्वरी विश्वविद्यालय
- University seal
- Motto: Bhadraṃ bhadraṃ kratur asmāsu dhehi (Sanskrit)
- Type: State university
- Established: 19 July 2024; 2 years ago
- Academic affiliations: UGC; AIU; NCTE
- Chancellor: Governor of Uttar Pradesh
- Vice-Chancellor: Prof. Ravi Shankar Singh
- Location: Balrampur, Uttar Pradesh, India
- Campus: Rural
- Language: English; Hindi
- Website: mpublp.ac.in

Maa Pateswari University ((MPU), माँ पाटेश्वरी विश्वविद्यालय, pronounced [mɑː pāʈeːʃʋəriː ʋiʃʋʋid̪jɑːlɛj]) is a state university located in Balrampur district, Uttar Pradesh, India. It was established by the Government of Uttar Pradesh in 2024 to promote higher education in the Devipatan division which include Balrampur, Gonda, Bahraich, Shravasti and adjoining areas.

== History ==
The Government of Uttar Pradesh first proposed setting up a state university in the Devipatan division, which includes Balrampur, in its 2023–24 state budget. The proposal was subsequently approved by the state cabinet, and the institution was notified under the Uttar Pradesh State Universities Act, 1973.

The foundation stone of Maa Pateswari University was laid by Chief Minister Yogi Adityanath on 15 March 2024 in Balrampur.

== Campus and Infrastructure ==
The university’s permanent campus is being developed in Balrampur district. As per the architectural firm STHAPATI, which designed the campus plan, it spans around 25,000 square metres and is planned in two phases, combining academic blocks, administrative areas and residential zones with sustainable and eco-friendly design.

== Academics ==
=== Organisation and Administration ===
The Chancellor of the university is the Smt. Anandiben Patel, while the Vice-Chancellor is Prof. Ravi Shankar Singh.

=== Affiliation and Recognition ===
According to its official website, Maa Pateswari University is recognised under Section 2(f) of the University Grants Commission (UGC).

=== Programmes and Initiatives ===
In June 2025, the university announced new academic programmes in religion, culture and classical languages including Tamil, Odia and Kannada. It also introduced dual-degree options such as B.A.+LL.B. and B.Sc.+LL.B., which can be pursued in regular as well as online modes.

== Student Admission ==
Admissions to the university and its affiliated colleges are conducted online through the Government of India's Samarth eGov platform. Applicants complete registration online and subsequently verify their documents at the respective affiliated colleges.

== Jurisdiction ==
The university affiliates colleges located in districts under the Devipatan division and adjoining regions.

== Controversies ==
=== Examination and grading Controversies ===
The National New Education Policy (NEP 2020) framework introduced in its educational circular, Maa Pateswari University has restructured examination format containing five subjective questions carrying 20 marks each and subsequently giving only two hours window to write highly detailed answer in 24 minutes each with no time for question paper reading, no internal marking system. This defeats the core objective of the National NEP Education framework.

The format led widespread disqualification and sparked a local demonstrations by its affiliated colleges include MLK PG College, where students and the faculty has raised serious allegation on evaluation process, high rate of course failures, Farzi back (fake back-paper) and increase in the fee. Despite the allegation on the University on its format the University has came with clean hand blaming the technical glitch whereas the University is using Samarth Portal for admission and results management which raises serious questions on the quality of the educational by the University.

== See also ==
- List of colleges affiliated with Maa Pateshwari University
- List of universities in Uttar Pradesh
- Higher education in India
