= Mankapur =

- Town
- Location in Uttar Pradesh, India
- Coordinates: 27.03°N 82.23°E
- Country: India
- State: Uttar Pradesh
- District: Gonda

Government
  - Body: BJP
  - MLA: Ramapati Shastri
- Elevation: 1,000 m (3,300 ft)

Population (2011)
  - Total: 9,461

Languages
  - Official: Hindi, Awadhi
- Time zone: UTC+5:30 (IST)
- PIN: 271302,271308
- Telephone code: 05265
- Vehicle registration: UP-43

Mankapur is a town and a nagar panchayat in Gonda district in the Indian state of Uttar Pradesh. It is a constituency of Uttar Pradesh Legislative Assembly currently headed by BJP. It borders Gonda to the West, Rehra bazar to the North, Maskanwa to the East and Nawabganj to the South.

== Demographics ==
According to the 2001 India census, Mankapur had a population of 8,865. Males constituted 54 percent of the population and females 46 percent. The city had an average literacy rate of 77 percent, which exceeded the national average of 67.5 percent. Male literacy was higher than female literacy, with 86 percent to 75 percent. 13 percent of the population was revealed to be under 6 years of age.

== Languages ==
Languages spoken in Mankapur include Awadhi, a dialect of Hindi continuum spoken by over 38 million people, mainly in the Awadh region.

== History ==
The estate was formerly in the hands of Bhars, whose chief Makka Bhar cleared the forest and founded the village of Mankapur calling it after him. Makka Bhar and his descendants ruled here for six generations. They were in turn subdued by Newal Singh, a Chandrabansi or Bandhalgoti Kshatriya who reigned at Maksara, a village of this pargana. This Kshatriya clan ruled at Mankapur for 12 generations, and the last of the line was Partab Singh, who left no issue at his death. His wife became a sati with her husband, and her sati chabutara stands in mauza Bhitaura in this pargana. Rani Bhagmati, the mother of Partab Singh, then adopted Azmat Singh, a son of Datt Singh, the Bisen Raja of Gonda, who was her sister’s husband. Thus the Mankapur raj was acquired by the Bisen family. Mankapur mandal was a Taluqedari (estate) formed when Raja Dutt Singh of Gonda, of the Bisen Rajput dynasty, seized from Bandhalgoti rajputs of Mankapur and gave it to his younger infant son, Kunwar Ajmat Singh around 1681, making him the first ruler of the state. The last ruler of this Taluqedari before independence was Raghavendra Pratap Singh, who was a Congress politician (1933–1955) and who served in the UP assembly continuously since 1937.

The last head of the Mankapur Taluqedari, and the last ruler of Mankapur was former Uttar Pradesh Agriculture Minister Maharaja Anand Singh, father to current Member of Parliament from Gonda, Shri Kirti Vardhan Singh. Other immediate members of the royal family include:

- Jai Vardhan Singh
- Rajkumari Niharika Kumari
  - Akshay Singh
  - Aditi Singh
- Rajkumari Shivani Singh Ji
  - Anirudh Singh
  - Arnav Singh
  - Shephali Singh
- Rajkumari Radhika Singh Ji
  - Vasudev Singh

The state had 189 villages under it and during the British Raj, it was a pargana in Utraula tehsil. It became a separate tehsil in 1987, later in 1997 when the Gonda district was divided to create Balrampur district, it remained with its former district.

== Transport ==
Mankapur Junction railway station is the nearest railway station and the nearest airport is Ayodhya Airport (46.8 km). Mankapur is well connected by roadways to Gonda, Ayodhya and state capital of Lucknow.

== Economy ==
Mankapur has one of the country's six largest manufacturing plants of Indian Telephone Industries (ITI). Along with that major occupation of public is Agriculture. With good connectivity with other districts, Mankapur serves as a luring place for further industrial growth.

== Geography ==
The famous Manwar River passes through Mankapur, next to the Manwar Estate of the Mankapur Taluqedars. Unfortunately, the river is dying a slow death, so a cleaning program was initiated by Yogi Adityanath in order to rejuvenate the flow of river. It is believed that Lord Dasrath performed Yagya at Makhoda Dham resulting in birth of Lord Rama.
