= Gonda, Uttar Pradesh =

City in Uttar Pradesh, India

Gonda
- City
- Location within Uttar Pradesh Location within India
- Coordinates: 27.13°N 81.93°E
- Country: India
- State: Uttar Pradesh
- District: Gonda
- Region: Anga or Angdesh

Government
  - Type: Government of Uttar Pradesh
  - Body: Bharatiya Janata Party
  - Member of Parliament: Kirti Vardhan Singh
- Elevation: 120 m (390 ft)

Population (2025)
  - Total: 168,000

Language
  - Official: Hindi
  - Additional official: Urdu
  - Regional language: Awadhi
- Time zone: UTC+5:30 (IST)
- Postal code: 271001
- Vehicle registration: UP-43
- Sex Ratio: 944 ♂/♀
- Website: gonda.nic.in

Gonda is a city and a municipal board in the Gonda district of the Indian state of Uttar Pradesh. It serves as the administrative headquarters of the district. The city is located about 125 km (78 mi) north-east of the state capital, Lucknow.

The district of Gonda is administratively divided into four tehsils: -

1. Gonda
2. Colonelganj
3. Tarabganj
4. Mankapur.

== See also ==
- Gonda District
