= Gonda district =

Coordinates: 27°15′N 82°00′E

- District of Uttar Pradesh
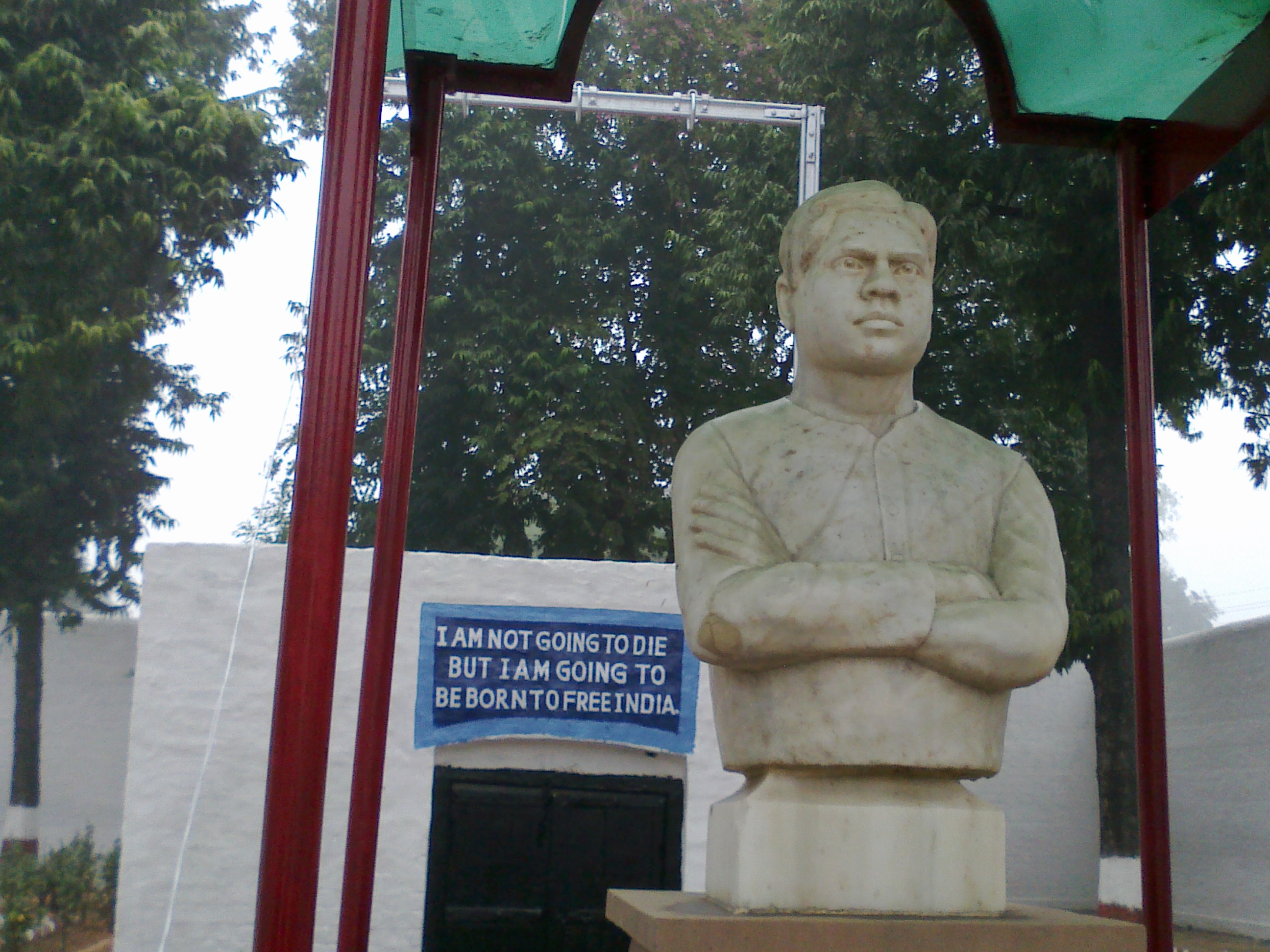
- Statue of Rajendranath Lahiri at Gonda District Jail

- Location of Gonda district in Uttar Pradesh
- Country: India
- State: Uttar Pradesh
- Division: Devipatan
- Town: 1620; 406 years ago
- District: 1856; 170 years ago
- Founder: Raja Maan Singh
- Named for: Gonard
- Headquarters: Gonda
- Tehsils: 4 Colonelganj; Gonda; Mankapur; Tarabganj

Government
  - District magistrate: Priyanka Niranjan
  - Lok Sabha constituencies: Gonda
  - Vidhan Sabha constituencies: 7 Colonelganj; Mankapur; Gonda Sadar; Gaura; Mehnaun; Tarabganj; Katra Bazar

Area
  - Total: 4,003 km^{2} (1,546 sq mi)

Population (2011)
  - Total: 3,433,919
  - Density: 857.8/km^{2} (2,222/sq mi)
  - Urban: 225,029
- Demonym(s): Gondvi, Gondvian

Demographics
  - Effective literacy: 58.71%
  - Sex ratio: 921
- Time zone: UTC+05:30 (IST)
- Postal code: 271001
- Area code: 0-5262
- Vehicle registration: UP-43
- Major highways: 4 NH27, UPSH 30, UPSH 9, UPSH 1A
- Average annual precipitation: 22.4 mm
- Website: gonda.nic.in

Gonda district is an administrative district in the Awadh region of the state of Uttar Pradesh, India. The district headquarters is located at the city of Gonda, which also serves as the administrative centre of the Devipatan division. The district covers an area of 4,003 km^{2} (1,546 sq mi).

District-wide vote share by party in Gonda (Assembly elections, 2022). Data aggregated from all seven constituency result pages of the Election Commission of India: Mehnaun (AC 295), Gonda (AC 296), Katraa Bazar (AC 297), Colonelganj (AC 298), Tarabganj (AC 299), Mankapur (AC 300), Gaura (AC 301). Accessed 3 October 2025.
1. BJP (51.7%)
2. SP (37.3%)
3. BSP (4.25%)
4. INC (3.56%)
5. Others (incl. smaller parties, independents & NOTA) (3.19%)

== History ==
=== Early / Ancient period ===
The area of present-day Gonda district lay within the ancient kingdom of Kosala, one of the sixteen Mahajanapadas of early India, with Ayodhya and Shravasti as major centres. Archaeological remains associated with early Buddhism have been discovered in the region, particularly around Shravasti.

=== Medieval and early modern period ===
In the early medieval era, the region was ruled by the Kalachuris of Sarayupara (c. 8th–11th centuries), whose domain along the Sarayu (Ghaghara) included parts of Bahraich and Gonda. From the 12th century onward, Gonda was gradually absorbed into larger north Indian polities and became part of the administrative apparatus of the Awadh region under successive sultanates and later the Mughal Empire.

=== Company and British period ===
Gonda was originally part of the Nizamat of Gorakhpur. After the cession of Gorakhpur to the British in 1801 under a treaty with the Nawab of Oudh, Gonda was united administratively with Bahraich.

When Awadh was annexed in 1856 by the British, Gonda was constituted as a separate district. On 7 January 1875, a boundary settlement ceded the tract between Baghaura Tal and the Arrah River to Nepal.

=== Swaminarayan's birthplace – Chhapaiya ===
The village of Chhapaiya in Gonda district is widely recognized as the birthplace of Swaminarayan (born Ghanshyam Pande in 1781). This is an established fact in local government and pilgrimage sources, though academic historical research on the early life of Swaminarayan is limited.

=== Role in the Indian independence movement ===
Gonda was involved in India's struggle for independence. Notably, Raja Devi Bakhsh Singh escaped to Nepal during the 1857 rebellion. It is also recorded that Chandra Shekhar Azad sought refuge in the region, and Rajendra Lahiri was imprisoned and executed in Gonda Jail.

=== Recent history ===
In independent India, the district came into the national spotlight following the 1982 Gonda Encounter, in which 13 persons were killed in a staged police encounter. In 2013, a special CBI court sentenced three policemen to death and five others to life imprisonment for their roles in the case.

== Economy and development ==
Agriculture and the sugar industry are the mainstays of the economy of Gonda district. Several sugar mills are located in and around the district:

- The Balrampur Chini Mills Limited unit at Babhnan is operational. It also hosts a molasses-based distillery, commissioned with a capacity of 60 kL/day in 2004.
- The Balrampur Chini Mills Limited unit at Mankapur is operational.
- The Sarju Sahkari Chini Mills Ltd. at Belrayan is also operational.
- The Kisan Sahkari Chini Mills Ltd. at Gonda remains of uncertain operational status.

In addition to sugar processing, alcohol production through molasses-based distilleries contributes to the industrial economy of the district.

=== Development status ===
In 2006, the Ministry of Panchayati Raj identified Gonda as one of India's 250 "most backward districts" (out of a total of 640). It was also one of 35 districts in Uttar Pradesh that received allocations under the Backward Regions Grant Fund (BRGF).

The BRGF programme was delinked from the central budget beginning in financial year 2015–16, pursuant to the implementation of the Fourteenth Finance Commission's recommendations of enhanced state revenue share. Subsequently, Gonda district has been included in the Government of India's Aspirational Districts Programme under the aegis of NITI Aayog, which seeks to accelerate development across health, education, agriculture, financial inclusion, and infrastructure indicators.

== Demographics ==
=== Historical population ===
Historical population and sex ratio of Gonda district (1901–2011)
Year	Population	Sex ratio (♀/1000 ♂)	Source
1901	873,630	—	
1911	879,226	—	
1921	917,115	—	
1931	980,987	—	
1941	1,070,397	—	
1951	1,168,645	—	
1961	1,279,883	—	
1971	1,409,722	—	
1981	1,749,260	—	
1991	2,204,445	—	
2001	2,765,586	—	
2011	3,433,919	921	

Religions in Gonda district (2011)
Religion	Percent
Hinduism	79.77%
Islam	19.76%
Christian	0.14%
Sikh	0.06%
Buddhist	0.02%
Jain	0.01%
Other religions and persuasions (ORP)	0.00%
Religion not stated	0.25%

According to the 2011 census Gonda district has a population of 3,433,919, roughly equal to the nation of Panama or the US state of Connecticut. This gives it a ranking of 95th in India (out of a total of 640). The total number of literates in the district is 1,679,99 which constitute 48.9% of the total population. Population in the age range of 0 to 6 years was 572,386. The effective literacy (population 7 years and above) was 58.7%. The district has a population density of 857 inhabitants per square kilometre (2,220/sq mi). Its population growth rate over the decade 2001-2011 was 24.17%, higher than the average of Uttar Pradesh (20.09%). Gonda has a sex ratio of 921 females for every 1000 males, and a sex ratio among children 0–6 years old of 926, both higher than the state average (908 and 899 respectively). 6.55% of the population lives in urban areas. Scheduled Castes made up 15.49% of the population.

The human development index of the Gonda district is very low.

=== Languages ===
The official language of the district is Hindi.

At the time of the 2011 Census of India, 81.03% of the population in the district reported Hindi as their mother tongue, 16.04% reported Awadhi, and 2.68% reported Urdu.

Languages of Gonda district (2011) (Note: Many speakers of Awadhi self-report their mother tongue as "Hindi" in the Census, which leads to Awadhi being underrepresented. See "Language Census 2011: Concepts & Definitions (C-16)" (PDF). Office of the Registrar General & Census Commissioner. 2018. and Grierson, George A. (1916). The Linguistic Survey of India, Volume IX, Part I: Indo-Aryan Family, Central Group. Calcutta: Government of India Press. pp. 3–15..)
1. Hindi (81.0%)
2. Awadhi (16.0%)
3. Urdu (2.68%)
4. Others (0.25%)

Awadhi is traditionally the dominant spoken language of the region, as Gonda lies within the cultural area of Awadh. Although the 2011 Census records over four-fifths of the population as speaking Hindi, this figure includes regional varieties such as Awadhi, which 16.04% explicitly identified. Linguists note that Awadhi continues to be widely used in daily communication, folk songs, oral traditions, and local literature, while standard Hindi serves as the formal and administrative language.

Apart from Hindi, languages spoken in the district include Awadhi, a variety of the Hindi continuum spoken by over 38 million people in the Awadh region, as well as Bhojpuri and English, though their numbers in the district are too small to be reported separately in the Census.

== Tehsils (Sub-district) ==
There are four Tehsils in Gonda district.

1. Colonelganj
2. Gonda
3. Mankapur
4. Tarabganj

== Blocks ==
Gonda district comprises 16 Blocks:

1. Babhanjot
2. Belsar
3. Chhapia
4. Colonelganj
5. Haldharmau
6. Itiathok
7. Jhanjhari
8. Katra Bazar
9. Mankapur
10. Mujehana
11. Nawabganj
12. Pandri Kripal
13. Paraspur
14. Rupaidih
15. Tarabganj
16. Wazirganj

== Townships and villages ==
- ITI Township Mankapur

== Education ==
The effective literacy rate (7+) is 58.71%, the state average (69.72%). The government of India has created a special scheme for underdeveloped districts through the "Backward Region Grant Fund". Gonda is one of the recipients of this fund.

=== Institutions and schools ===
- LBS Degree College
- Meena Shah Institute of Technology and Management (MSITM) Degree College
- Saraswati Devi Nari Gyansthali P.G. College
- St Xaviers Senior Secondary School.
- Saraswati Vidya Mandir Inter College Malviya Nagar, Gonda

== Public health ==
Gonda has 15 hospitals, 27 Ayurvedic hospitals, 11 Homeopathic hospitals and 2 Unani hospitals, in addition to 66 Government Primary Health Centres. Gonda is one of the districts in the list of top 100 districts in order of Infant Mortality Rate in 2011 census data. It also comes in the top 57 districts with the highest maternal mortality rate

Gonda has been listed as cleanest Nagar Palika in entire Uttar Pradesh according to the Swachhta Sarvekshan 2022 overturning its last position in the country as per the 2017 survey.

== Notable people ==
- Patanjali, the Sanskrit author Gonardiya is generally identified with Patanjali, the epithet denotes someone from Gonarda, which has been identified by some with Gonda.
- Raja Anand Singh
- Adam Gondvi
- Vinod Singh
- Brij Bhushan Sharan Singh
- Kirti Vardhan Singh
- Bawan Singh
- Ketki Devi Singh
- Fasi-ur-Rehman Munnan Khan
- Satya Deo Singh
- Raja Devi Bakhsh Singh
- Babu Ishwar Sharan Singh
