= Basantpur, Pachperwa =

Village in Balrampur, India

Basantpur
- Village
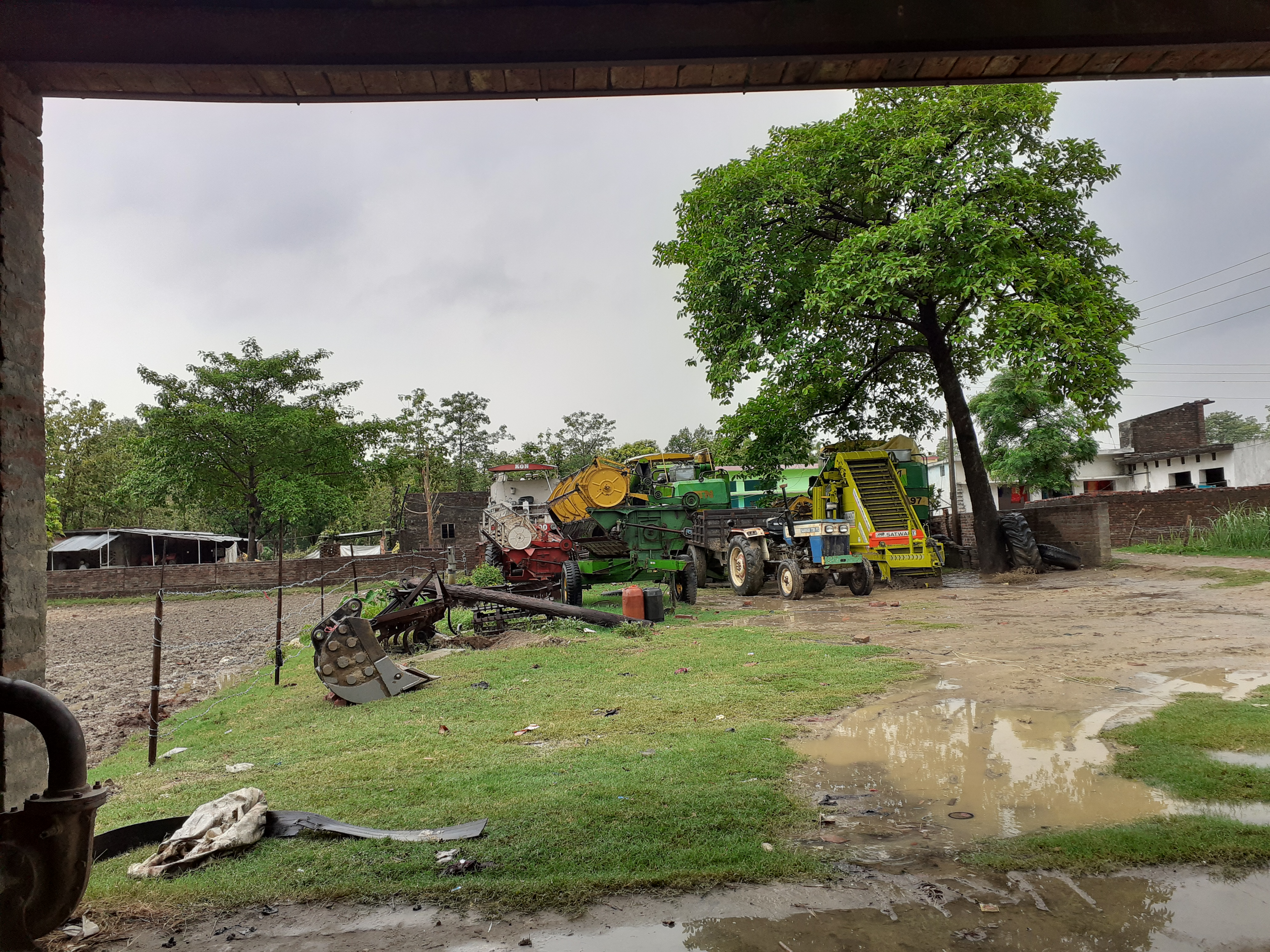
- Basantpur after raining

- Location in Uttar Pradesh, India Basantpur (India) Basantpur (Asia)
- Coordinates: 27.44°N 82.60°E
- Country: India
- District: Balrampur
- State: Uttar Pradesh
- Post: Madhyanagar

Government
  - Type: Gram Panchayat
  - Sarpanch (Pradhan): Shabnam Khan

Population (2011)
  - Total: 3,776

Language
  - Official: Hindi
  - Additional official: Urdu

Electricity
  - In Village: Available
- India: +91
- Pin code: 271215
- Vehicle registration: UP-47
- Vidhan Sabha Constituency: Gainsari
- Lok Sabha Constituency: Shravasti
- Website: https://balrampur.nic.in/

Basantpur is a village in Pachperwa Block, Balrampur district of Uttar Pradesh State, India.

== Demographics ==
As of 2011 Indian Census, Basantpur had a total population of 3,776, of which 2,012 were males and 1,764 were females. Population within the age group of 0 to 6 years was 631. The total number of literates in Basantpur was 1,561, which constituted 41.3% of the population with male literacy of 48.0% and female literacy of 33.8%. The effective literacy rate of the 7+ population of Basantpur was 49.6%, of which male literacy rate was 57.9% and female literacy rate was 40.3%. The Scheduled Castes population was 131. Basantpur had 475 households in 2011.

== Politics ==
The sarpanch of Basantpur is Shabnam Khan. The panchayat has five ward members chosen by the people through polling. The village was named after Annie Besant.

== Transport ==
Nearest railway station is Pachperwa railway station.

== See also ==
- Bargadwa Saif
- Ganeshpur
