= Shiv Pratap Yadav =

Member of the Uttar Pradesh Legislative Assembly (1951-2024)

Shiv Pratap Yadav Dr.

Minister of State Government of Uttar Pradesh
- In office 2012–2017
- Chief Minister: Akhilesh Yadav
- Ministry & Department's: Zoological Garden
- In office 2003–2004
- Chief Minister: Mulayam Singh Yadav
- Ministry & Department's: Agriculture

Member of Uttar Pradesh Legislative Assembly
- In office 2022–2024
- Preceded by: Shailesh Kumar Singh
- Succeeded by: Rakesh Kumar Yadav
- In office 2012–2017
- Preceded by: Alauddin
- Succeeded by: Shailesh Kumar Singh (Shailu)
- In office 2002–2007
- Preceded by: Vindu Lal
- Succeeded by: Alauddin
- In office 1993–1996
- Preceded by: Vindu Lal
- Succeeded by: Vindu Lal
- Constituency: Gainsari

Personal details
- Born: 3 July 1951 Balrampur, Uttar Pradesh
- Died: 26 January 2024 (aged 72) Medanta, Gurugram
- Party: Samajwadi Party
- Children: Rakesh Kumar Yadav
- Education: Doctor of Philosophy
- Alma mater: Dr. Ram Manohar Lohia Avadh University
- Profession: Politician

Shiv Pratap Yadav (3 July 1951 – 26 January 2024) was an Indian politician and a member of the Samajwadi Party. He was a member of the 12th, 14th, 16th, and 18th Uttar Pradesh Assembly from the Gainsari Assembly constituency of Balrampur district.

== Early life ==
Shiv Pratap Yadav was born in Uttar Pradesh, India, to a Hindu Yadav family of Ram Lal Yadav. He died on 26 January 2024. After his death, his son, Rakesh Kumar Yadav, was elected as a member of the 18th Uttar Pradesh Assembly from the Gainsari Assembly of Balrampur.

== Education ==
Shiv Pratap Yadav completed his post-graduation with a Master of Science at the Deen Dayal Upadhyay Gorakhpur University, Gorakhpur, in 1973. Later, he joined Dr. Ram Manohar Lohia Avadh University, Faizabad, where he completed a Doctor of Philosophy in 1978.

== Posts held ==
#	From	To	Position	Ref
01	1993	1996	Member, 12th Uttar Pradesh Assembly	
01	2002	2007	Member, 14th Uttar Pradesh Assembly	
01	2012	2017	Member, 16th Uttar Pradesh Assembly	
02	2022	2024	Member, 18th Uttar Pradesh Assembly	
