= Jaitapur, Balrampur =

Jaitapur
- Village
- Interactive map of Jaitapur
- Country: India
- State: Uttar Pradesh
- District: Balrampur
- Vehicle registration: UP 47

Jaitapur is a village in Gainsari Mandal, Balrampur district, Uttar Pradesh State. Jaitapur is 18 km distance from its town Gainsari. Jaitapur is 35 km distance from its district main city Balrampur and 167 km distance from its state main city Lucknow.
