= Bargadwa Saif =

- Village
- Location in Uttar Pradesh, India Bargadwa Saif (India) Bargadwa Saif (Asia)
- Coordinates: 27.50°N 82.64°E
- Country: India
- State: Uttar Pradesh
- District: Balrampur

Population (2011)
  - Total: 7,130

Bargadwa is a village in Pachperwa block, Balrampur district, Uttar Pradesh, India.

In 2011, the total population of this village was 7130 (3746 males and 3384 females). There is one bank, Allahabad Bank, upon exiting this village.

== See also ==
Bargadwa Saif was owned by one of the landlord called Saif Khan from Mahato gharana. His one of the elder brother called Teja Khan was a popular landlord in a village called Patherdeiya, Lumbini, Nepal. His property estimated near 24 villages and 8 kasbaas. Bargadwa Saif village is named in honour of Saif Mahato

- Basantpur, Pachperwa
- Ganeshpur, Pachperwa
