= Rehra bazar =

Rehra Bazar is a block located in Balrampur district in rural Uttar Pradesh. It is one of the nine blocks of Balrampur district. According to the administration records, the block code of Rehra Bazar is 564. The block has 96 villages and there are total 32,318 houses in this block. Pincode of Rehra baza is 271306.There are 81 gram panchayats and 96 villages in Rehra Bazar kshetra panchayat / block. Hindi and Urdu are spoken by the natives here.

== Demographics ==
The total geographical area in which this village is expanded in 287.61 ha (710.7 acres) (2.88 km^{2}). Rehra Bazar's population is 217,742. Out of this, 111,391 are males while the females count 106,351 here. This block has 37,451 children in the age bracket of 0–6 years. Among them 19,374 are boys and 18,077 are girls. The latitude 27.182732 and 82.28908 longitude are the geocoordinate of the Rehra Bazar. Utraula, Balrampur, Tulsipur, and Faizabad are the nearby cities to Rehra bazar.

== Education ==
The literacy ratio in Rehra Bazar block is 46%. 101,849 out of a total 217,742 population is literate here. Among males, the literacy ratio is 55% as 61,954 males out of total 111,391 are literate while female literacy rate is 37% as 39,895 out of total 106,351 females are literate in this block.

The negative portion is that the illiteracy ratio of Rehra Bazar block is shockingly high – 53%. Here 115,893 out of total 217,742 people are illiterate. Male illiteracy rate here is 44% as 49,437 males out of total 111,391 are uneducated. In females, the illiteracy ratio is 62% and 66,456 out of total 106,351 females are illiterate in this block.

== Educational Institutes in Rehra Bazar Block ==
School name	Village	Cluster	Pin Code
P.s. Rehra Bazar (ii) School	Rehra Bazar	Rehra Bazar	271206
Kasturaba Gandhi Balika Vidy. School	Adhinpur	Rehra Bazar	271226
P.s. Barhya Farid Khan School	Barhya Farid Khan	Rehra Bazar	271306
U.p.s. Budhipur School	Boodhipur	Rehra Bazar	271306
P.s. Keradeeh School	Kerideeh	Rehra Bazar	271306
Mah.dayanand Sar.j.h. School	Kirtapur	Rehra Bazar	271306
P.s. Kirtapur School	Kirtapur	Rehra Bazar	271306
U.p.s. Kirtapur School	Kirtapur	Rehra Bazar	271306
U.p.s. Rehara Bazar School	Rehra Bazar	Rehra Bazar	271306
P.s. Rudhauli School	Rudhauli	Rehra Bazar	271306
P.s. Sonapar (ii) School	Sonapar	Rehra Bazar	271306
P.s. Sonapar School	Sonapar	Rehra Bazar	271306
U.p.s. Sonapar School	Sonapar	Rehra Bazar	271306
Shri Ram Janki Bal V. Mandir School	Achalpur Roop	Rehra Bazar	271307
P.s. Banjariya Husain School	Banjariya Husain	Rehra Bazar	271307

== Transportation ==
Rehra Bazar is 177 km from State capital Lucknow, Deoria Mainaha (1 km), Garib Nagar (1 km), Majhowa Kurthua (2 km), Jogiveer (2 km), and Sahpur Itai (2 km) are the nearby villages.

- Balrampur - 28 km
- Tulsipur - 28 km
- Gainsari Jn - 33 km
- Lakhpat Nagar - 36 km

Airport:

- Gorakhpur Airport - 135 km
- Amausi Airport - 179 km
- Varanasi Airport - 236 km
- Bamrauli Airport - 242 km
