= Basantpur =

Basantpur may refer to:

- Basantpur, Bara, town and village development community in Nepal
- Basantpur, Pachperwa, village development in Balrampur district, Uttar Pradesh
- Basantpur, Parsa, village development community in Nepal
- Basantpur (community development block), Siwan, a block in Bihar, India

- Basantpur, Siwan (Vidhan Sabha constituency) - in Bihar, India

- Basantpur, Sohaon, village in Uttar Pradesh, India
