= Kailash Nath Shukla =

Member of the Uttar Pradesh Legislative Assembly

Member of Uttar Pradesh Legislative Assembly
- Incumbent
- Assumed office March 2017
- Preceded by: Abdul Mashhood Khan
- Constituency: Tulsipur

Personal details
- Born: 18 February 1959 (age 67) Balrampur, Uttar Pradesh
- Party: Bharatiya Janata Party
- Profession: Politician

Kailash Nath Shukla is an Indian politician and a member of the Bharatiya Janata Party. He is a member of the 18th Uttar Pradesh Assembly from the Tulsipur Assembly constituency of Balrampur district.

== Early life ==
Kailash Nath Shukla was born on 18 February 1959 in Balrampur, Uttar Pradesh, to a Hindu family of Rajmani Shukla. He married Champa Shukla in 1975 and they had 2 children.
