= Tilgadiya Buzurg =

Village in Uttar Pradesh, India

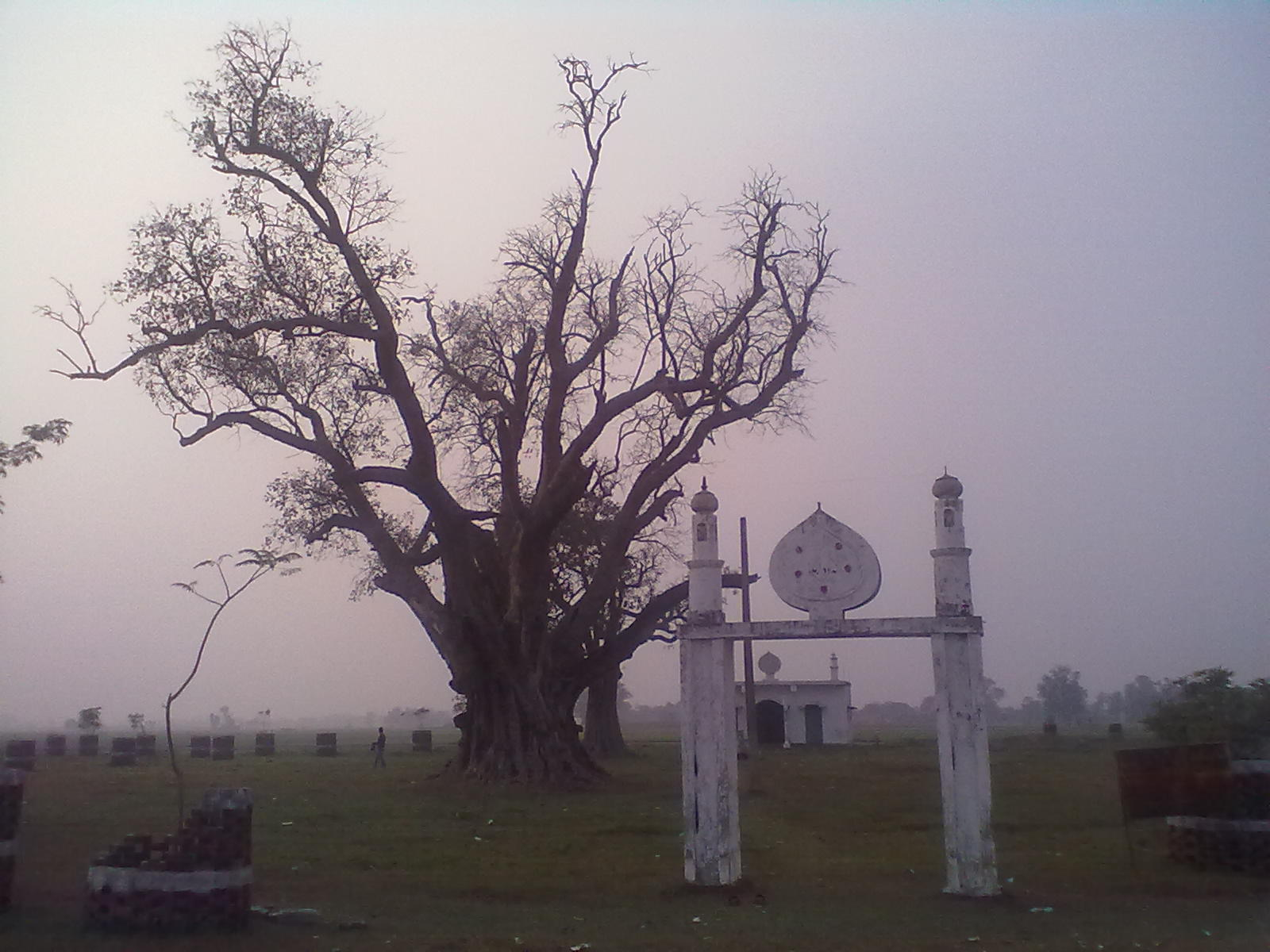
Karbala Gate & Sacred Banyan Tree Tilgadiya Buzurg

Tilgadiya Buzurg is a village in the Domariyaganj Tehsil of Siddharthnagar district in the North Indian state of Uttar Pradesh. It is situated near the banks of Rapti River. Majority of the residents of Tilgadiya are Kazmi by lineage.

It is only 104 km away from Gorakhpur Airport. The major Railway Station Basti that connects to maximum number of main stations in India is only 50 km away from this village. It is located 51 km towards west from district headquarters Navgarh, and 203 km from state capital Lucknow. Tilgadiya Buzurg is surrounded by Khuniyaon Tehsil towards East, Itwa Tehsil towards North, Ramnagar Tehsil towards South, Mithwal Tehsil towards East. Utraula, Tetri Bazar, Tulsipur, Balrampur are the nearby towns. Hindi is the local language of Tilgadiya.

== History ==
It is believed that some 400 years ago, a noble family of Sayyeds migrated from Iran during the Mughal period to propagate Shiasm in India. Currently the Saadat of this village are descendants of those Sayyeds. Majority of the population is Shia Isna Ashri but followers of other religions are also accounted for the population of this village. Prominent among them are Sunnis, Buddhists and Hindus. It is believed that the Shia population of this village is having their lineage from the 7th Imam Imam-e-Musa-al Kazim, hence the majority of the people are Kazmis. There are few families who have migrated from other villages and have settled here, prominent among them are Rizvis.

In ancient times the only source of livelihood of this village was farming but as time passed and people acquired education, things have changed a lot. Few families of this village are still called as Landlords or Zami'ndaar as they own huge amount of farmland even today. Tilgadiya has produced many Doctors, Engineers, Lawyers, Teachers, Chartered Accountant, Businessmen and professionals in almost every domain of life. One can also find various people of this village working for Indian Railways. But still majority of the population is in Interior Business working as contractors, labourers etc. Most of the professionals are settled in cities like Mumbai, Delhi, Lucknow, Dubai etc. The amazing thing about the people of tilgadiya is that they might be in any part of the world for the rest of the year but they will visit tilgadiya before the onset of Moharram.

== Demographics ==
Tilgadiya has a total population of 885 having male contribution as 416 and female contribution as 469. Majority of the people are Twelver Shiites with small population of other faiths such as Sunnis, Buddhists and Hindus. The Dalits, Lohaar, Sonaar etc. settled here are on the lands given by Sayyed Landlords of Tilgadiya. A separate locality of Dalits still exists in Tilgadiya.

== Education and literacy ==
The literacy rate among the people was a concern in ancient times but current population of the village especially between 18 and 40 years have 70% literacy. This includes Doctors, Engineers, Lawyers, Chartered Accountant and Professionals having Bachelors & Master's degree in arts, Science, Commerce, Business Administration and Computer Applications etc. But still the major section of the population is working as contractors or labourers in Interior Business. A substantial number of people are also working in government sectors like Indian Railways, India Post, Civil Health Dept, Ministry of Science & Technology.

The Department of Education has started Primary School in this village in 1967 with medium of instruction as Hindi. The village also has a Religious Educational Institute like Madresa partially managed by Tanzeem-ul-Makatib and the local body of the village. Tilgadiya is blessed with people having outstanding excellence in Fine Arts, Craft and Creativity. Tazia of Imam Hussain and other Manzar Kashi made during Maah-e-Aza is a clear proof of this.

== Culture and religion ==
Tilgadiya is predominantly made up of Shia Muslims, with many Shia houses of worship throughout the village. A temple at the outskirt of the village towards the eastern side is a holy place of worship for Hindus.

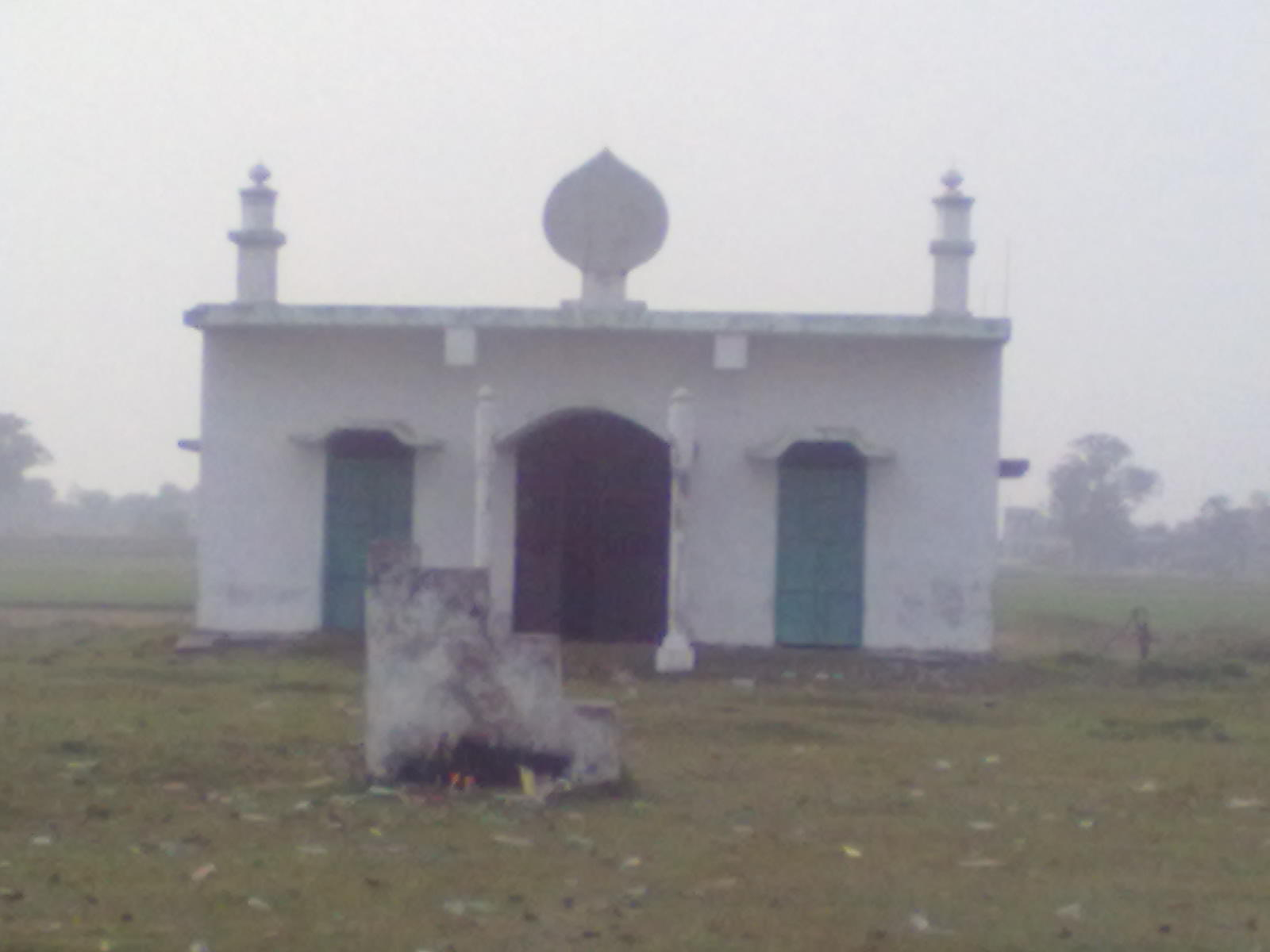
Karabala Imambada of Tilgadiya Buzurg

=== Expatriates ===
Almost 70% of the Tilgadiyan expatriate population are settled in Mumbai. Out of this 80% live in Govandi. They participate in several religious activities, like Shabbedari, Majlis, and Procession etc.
