= Pachperwa =

- Town
- Location in Uttar Pradesh, India Pachperwa (India)
- Coordinates: 27.52°N 82.65°E
- Country: India
- State: Uttar Pradesh
- District: Balrampur

Government
  - Nagar Panchayat Chairman: Saman Malik
- Elevation: 98 m (322 ft)

Population (2011)
  - Total: 17,220

Language
  - Official: Hindi
  - Additional official: Urdu
- Time zone: UTC+5:30 (IST)
- Postal code: 271215
- Telephone code: 05264
- Vehicle registration: UP 47
- Website: up.gov.in

Pachperwa is a town and a nagar panchayat in Balrampur district in the Indian state of Uttar Pradesh. Pachperwa is situated 54 km (34 mi) from district headquarters Balrampur and 200 km (120 mi) from state capital Lucknow. The National Highway 730 connected the town to district headquarters as well as other cities.

== Politics ==
The Pachperwa city is divided into 12 wards for which elections are held every 5 years.

== Demographics ==
As of 2011 Indian Census, Pachperwa Nagar Panchayat had a total population of 17,220, of which 8,915 were male and 8,305 were female. The female sex ratio was of 932. Population within the age group of 0 to 6 years was 2,646. The total number of literate persons in Pachperwa was 7,510, which constituted 43.6% of the population; with male literacy of 48.8% and female literacy of 38.1%. The effective literacy rate of 7+ population of Pachperwa was 51.5%, of which male literacy rate was 57.8% and female literacy rate was 44.9%. The Scheduled Castes and Scheduled Tribes population was 604 and 46 respectively. Pachperwa had 2573 households in 2011.

== See also ==
- Bargadwa Saif
- Basantpur
- Ganeshpur

== Transportation ==
=== Railways ===
Pachperwa is connected to Gorakhpur though rail. Gorakhpur-Badshahnagar Express halts at Pachperwa railway station.
