= Vinay Kumar Pandey =

Indian politician

Vinay Kumar pandey

Member of Parliament, Lok Sabha
- In office 2009–2014
- Preceded by: constituency established
- Succeeded by: Daddan Mishra
- Constituency: Shrawasti

Minister of State Government of Uttar Pradesh
- In office 1997–2001
- Governor: Romesh Bhandari; Suraj bhan; Vishnu Kant Shastri
- Chief Minister: Kalyan Singh
- Ministry & Department's: Homeguard's

Member of Uttar Pradesh Legislative Assembly
- In office 1993–2002
- Preceded by: Hanumant Singh
- Succeeded by: Geeta Singh
- Constituency: Balrampur

Personal details
- Born: 18 June 1964 (age 62) Mankapur, Uttar Pradesh, India
- Citizenship: India
- Party: Samajwadi Party
- Other political affiliations: Indian National Congress Akhil Bharatiya Loktantrik Congress
- Spouse: Mrs. Seema Pandey alias Divya
- Children: 1 son & 2 daughters
- Education: Dr. Ram Manohar Lohia Avadh University; Maharani Lal Kunwari P.G. College & University of Lucknow
- Profession: Farmer, Social Worker & Politician
- Committees: Member of four committees

Vinay Kumar Pandey (born 18 June 1964) was a member of the 15th Lok Sabha of India. He represented the Shrawasti constituency of Uttar Pradesh and is a member of the Samajwadi Party political party.

== Education and background ==
Pandey was born in Mankapur, Gonda (Uttar Pradesh). He holds PhD in Paleobotany. Pandey also holds Postgraduate diploma in Computer science, Ayurved Ratna and a certificate course in Processing and Cultivation of Aeromatic and Medicinal Plants.

== Posts held ==
#	From	To	Position
01	1988	1993	Member Gram Panchayat, Ghughulpur, Uttar Pradesh
02	1993	1994	MLA, Uttar Pradesh Legislative Assembly
03	1995	2001	MLA, Uttar Pradesh Legislative Assembly
04	1997	2001	Minister, Government of Uttar Pradesh
05	2009	2014	Elected to 15th Lok Sabha
06	2009	2014	Member, Committee on Human Resource Development
07	2009	2014	Member, Consultative Committee, Ministry of Communications and Information Technology
08	2009	2014	Member, Committee on Papers Laid on the Table
09	2009	2014	Member, Hindi Advisory Committee, Department of Revenue, Expenditure and Disinvestment, Comptroller and Auditor General

== See also ==
- List of members of the 15th Lok Sabha of India
- Politics of India
- Parliament of India
- Government of India
