= Gainsari Junction =

Railway station in Uttar Pradesh

Gainsari Junction railway station

General information
- Location: Gainsari, Balrampur, Uttar Pradesh; India
- Coordinates: 27.5271°N 82.5469°E
- System: Indian Railway Station
- Owner: Indian Railways
- Operator: North Eastern Railway
- Platforms: 2
- Tracks: 3

Construction
- Parking: No

Other information
- Status: Functioning
- Station code: GIR
- Zone(s): North Eastern Railway
- Division(s): Lucknow
Location
- Location within India Location within Uttar Pradesh

Gainsari Junction railway station is located in Gainsari town of Balrampur district, Uttar Pradesh state of India. Its code is GIR. It has two platforms. Passenger and DEMU trains halt here.
