= Tulsipur Assembly constituency =

Constituency of the Uttar Pradesh legislative assembly in India

Coordinates: 27.53°N 82.42°E

Tulsipur
- Constituency No. 291 for the Uttar Pradesh Legislative Assembly

Constituency details
- Country: India
- Region: North India
- State: Uttar Pradesh
- District: Balrampur
- Lok Sabha constituency: Shravasti
- Total electors: 3,83,960
- Reservation: None

Member of Legislative Assembly
- 18th Uttar Pradesh Legislative Assembly
- Incumbent Kailash Nath Shukla
- Party: Bharatiya Janata Party
- Elected year: 2022

Tulsipur is a constituency of the Uttar Pradesh Legislative Assembly covering the city of Tulsipur in the Balrampur district of Uttar Pradesh, India. It is one of five assembly constituencies in the Shravasti Lok Sabha constituency.

== Members of the Legislative Assembly ==
Year	Name	Party
2012	Abdul Mashhood Khan	Samajwadi Party
2017	Kailash Nath Shukla	Bharatiya Janata Party
2022	Kailash Nath Shukla	Bharatiya Janata Party

== Election results ==
=== 2027 ===
2027 Uttar Pradesh Legislative Assembly election: Tulsipur
Party	Candidate	Votes	%	±%
INDIA				
NDA				
BSP				
NOTA	None of the above			
Majority				
Turnout				
gain from		Swing		

=== 2022 ===
2022 Uttar Pradesh Legislative Assembly election: Tulsipur
Party	Candidate	Votes	%	±%
BJP	Kailash Nath	87,032	42.92	+11.37
Independent	Zeba Rizwan	51,251	25.27	
SP	Abdul Mashood Khan	42,815	21.11	+2.6
BSP	Bhuvan Pratap Singh	8,118	4.0	−7.79
INC	D S Dipankar	4,171	2.06	−20.04
NOTA	None of the above	2,228	1.1	−0.16
Majority		35,781	17.65	+8.2
Turnout		202,787	52.81	−0.94
BJP hold		Swing		

=== 2017 ===
2017 Uttar Pradesh Legislative Assembly election: Tulsipur
Party	Candidate	Votes	%	±%
BJP	Kailash Nath Shukla	62,296	31.55	
INC	Zeba Rizwan	43,637	22.1	
SP	Abdul Mashhood Khan	36,549	18.51	
BSP	Krishn Kumar Urf Dr. K. K. Sachan	23,273	11.79	
Independent	Rajeshwar Mishra	16,947	8.58	
LKD	Mahbub Aalam	2,047	1.04	
Independent	Renu	1,796	0.91	
NOTA	None of the above	2,459	1.26	
Majority		18,659	9.45	
Turnout		197,479	53.75	
Bhartiya Janta Party hold		Swing		

== See also ==
- List of constituencies of the Uttar Pradesh Legislative Assembly
- Balrampur district, Uttar Pradesh
