= Rakesh Kumar Yadav (politician) =

Member of the Uttar Pradesh Legislative Assembly

Member of Uttar Pradesh Legislative Assembly
- Incumbent
- Assumed office June 2024
- Preceded by: Shiv Pratap Yadav
- Constituency: Gainsari

Personal details
- Born: Uttar Pradesh, India
- Party: Samajwadi Party
- Parent: Shiv Pratap Yadav (father)
- Profession: Politician

Rakesh Kumar Yadav is an Indian politician and a member of the 18th Uttar Pradesh Assembly from the Gainsari Assembly constituency of Balrampur district. He is a member of the Samajwadi Party.

== Early life ==
Rakesh Kumar Yadav was born in Uttar Pradesh to a Hindu family of Shiv Pratap Yadav, a four-time MLA from the Gainsari Assembly constituency.
