= Sri Ram Chandra Singh Mahavidyalaya =

Educational Institution

Coordinates: 26.770000°N 82.150000°E

- Type: College
- Affiliations: Dr. Ram Manohar Lohia Avadh University
- Location: (India) Ayodhya, Uttar Pradesh, India
- Campus: Urban
- Colours
- Website: www.srcsm.org

Sri Ram Chandra Singh Mahavidyalaya (SRCSM) college is situated at Lohati Saraiya in Ayodhya district, Uttar Pradesh. The college is affiliated to Dr. Ram Manohar Lohia Avadh University.

== Programmes ==
The college offers undergraduate i.e. bachelor course under the aegis of its affiliate Dr. Ram Manohar Lohia Avadh University are-

- Bachelor of Science (B.Sc.)
- Bachelor of Arts (B.A)
