= Ram Shiromani Verma =

Member of the 17th Lok Sabha

Member of Parliament, Lok Sabha
- Incumbent
- Assumed office 23 May 2019
- Preceded by: Daddan Mishra
- Constituency: Shravasti

Personal details
- Party: Samajwadi Party
- Other political affiliations: Bahujan Samaj Party
- Parent: Dayaram Verma (father)
- Education: Avadh University
- Profession: Business and agriculture

Ram Shiromani Verma is an Indian politician and member of the Lok Sabha, the lower house of the Parliament of India. Verma is from Shravasti constituency, Uttar Pradesh and was elected in the 2024 Indian general election and 2019 Indian general election as member of the Samajwadi Party and Bahujan Samaj Party respectively.

== Political career ==
In March 2019, Mahagathbandhan, the grand alliance of Samajwadi Party, Bahujan Samaj Party and Rashtriya Lok Dal announced that Verma would contest the upcoming 2019 Indian general election from Shravasti constituency on the symbol of Bahujan Samaj Party. On 23 May, he was elected to the Lok Sabha after defeating Daddan Mishra, his nearest rival and sitting MP from Bharatiya Janata Party by a margin of 5,320 votes. Verma was polled 440,944 votes. After getting elected, he said that building a college, repairing roads and demanding an expansion of railways in his constituency were his priorities. Being a businessman, he is seldom seen in his constituency.

In 2024 Indian general election, he switched over to the Samajwadi Party and successfully defended his seat, defeating Bharatiya Janata Party candidate Saket Mishra by a margin of 76,673 votes.Sources:
