= Basantpur, Sohaon =

Basantpur is a village in the Ballia district of Uttar Pradesh, India. It is located in the Sohaon block of Ballia tehsil.

The village is divided into Basantpur Uttari and Basantpur Dakshini (or Dakchini). The postal code of the village is 277504.

The National Highway 31 (NH-31) passes by Basantpur.

The village comes under the purview of the Narahi police station. The nearest colleges are Sewa Sangh Inter College and Sant Gramyanchal Degree College. The nearest city is Buxar (15 km) in Bihar.
