= Shah Alam (filmmaker) =

Indian Filmmaker

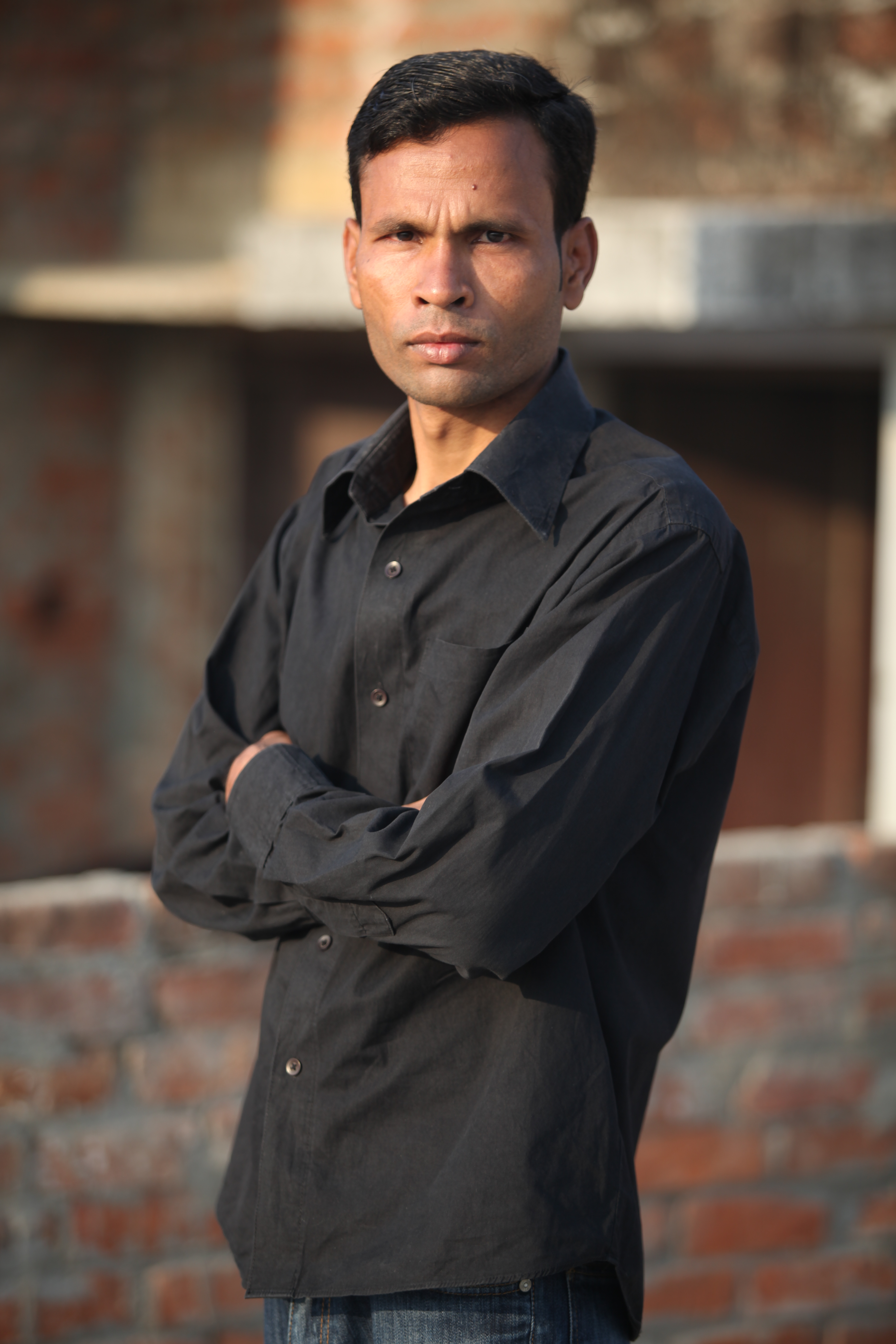
- Born: 22 September 1981 (age 44); Nakha, Basti, Uttar Pradesh, India
- Other name: Rana
- Education: Dr. Ram Manohar Lohia Avadh University, Faizabad; Jamia Millia Islamia, New Delhi
- Occupations: social activist journalist documentary film maker
- Known for: Awam Ka Cinema; Sunil Janah School of Photography, Chambal Valley
- Website: Awam Ka Cinema

Shah Alam (born 22 September 1981, Nakha, Basti) is a social activist and documentary film maker.

He is founder of Awam Ka Cinema (People's Cinema) & Sunil Janah School of Photography at Chambal Valley.

== Early life and career ==
Shah Alam born at Nakha, district Basti and he was an alumnus of the Dr. Ram Manohar Lohia Avadh University, Faizabad & Jamia Millia Islamia, New Delhi.

After completing his education he was working in TV news channels, later he founded an organisation named Awam Ka Cinema (People's Cinema) in 2006 & Sunil Janah School of Photography at Chambal Valley in 2017.

== Personal life ==
Now, Shah Alam lives in Chambal Valley. He is currently writing a book.
