= Pachperwa railway station =

Railway station in Uttar Pradesh India

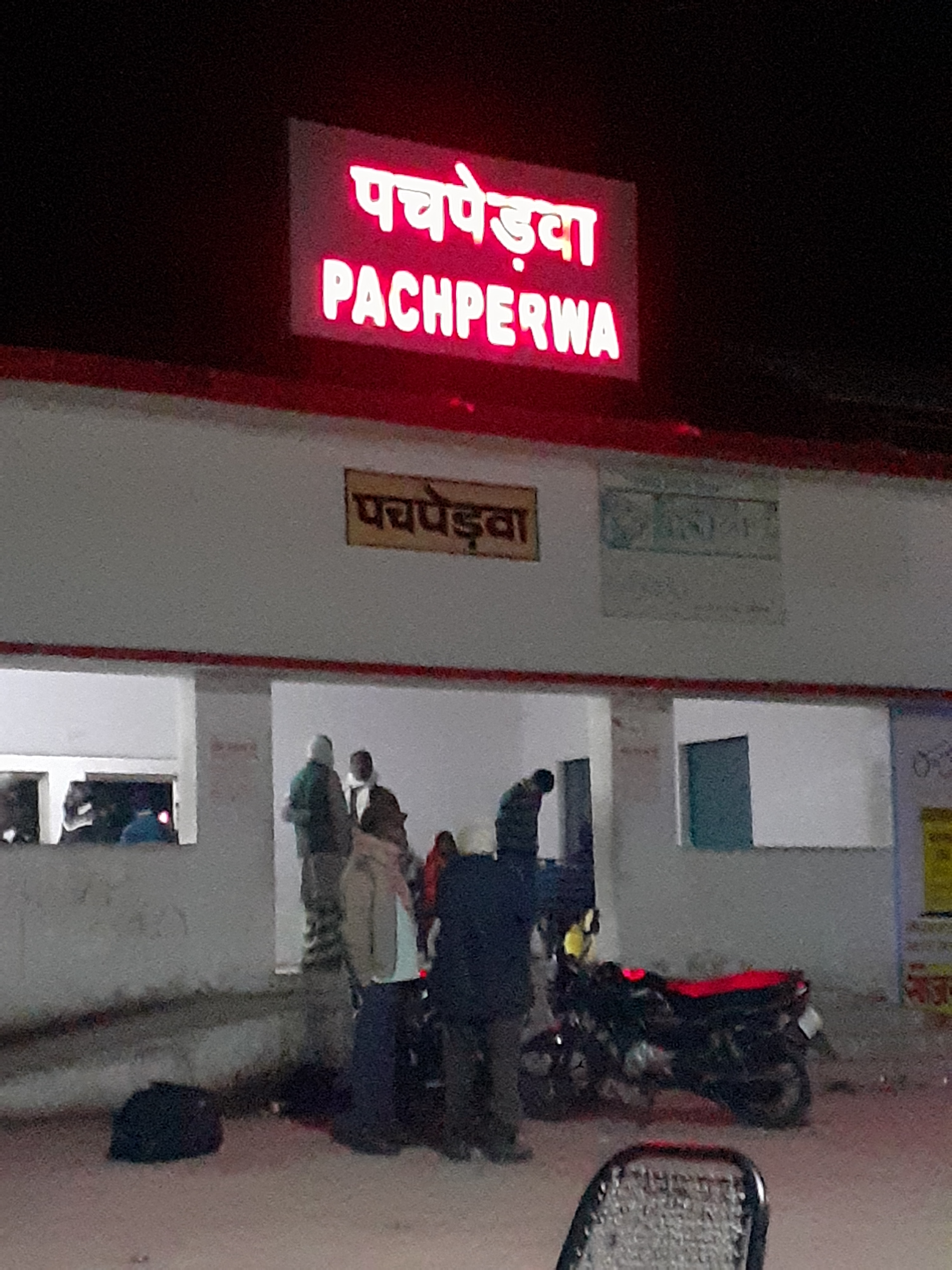
- Out of station

General information
- Location: Pachperwa, Balrampur district, Uttar Pradesh; India
- Coordinates: 27.5299°N 82.6387°E
- System: Indian Railways station
- Owner: Indian Railways
- Operator: North Eastern Railway
- Platforms: 2
- Tracks: 3

Construction
- Structure type: Standard
- Parking: No
- Cycle facilities: Yes

Other information
- Station code: PPW
- Zone(s): North Eastern Railway
- Division(s): Lucknow NER

History
- Opened: Yes
- Rebuilt: Yes
Location
- Location within India Location within Uttar Pradesh

Pachperwa railway station is located in Pachperwa town of Balrampur district, Uttar Pradesh, India. It serves Pachperwa town. Its code is PPW. It has two platforms. Passenger, DEMU, and Express trains halt here.

== Trains ==
There are many trains:

- Gorakhpur−Badshahnagar Intercity Express
- Gorakhpur–Sitapur Express (via Barhni)
- 55049/55050 Nakha Jungle–Daliganj Passenger
- 55031/55032 Nakaha Jungle–Lucknow Jn. Passenger
- 75007/75008 Gorakhpur–Gonda DEMU (via Barhni)
- 75002/75005 Gorakhpur–Gonda DEMU (via Barhni)
