= Gainsari =

- Town
- Location in India
- Coordinates: 27.53°N 82.53°E
- Country: India
- State: Uttar Pradesh
- District: Balrampur

Area
  - Total: 3.75 km^{2} (1.45 sq mi)
- Elevation: 109 m (358 ft)

Population (2011)
  - Total: 7,116
  - Density: 1,900/km^{2} (4,910/sq mi)

Languages
  - Official: Hindi Awadhi
- Time zone: UTC+5:30 (IST)
- PIN: 271210
- Telephone code: 05264
- Vehicle registration: UP-47

Gainsari is a nagar panchayat in Tulsipur tehsil, Balrampur district in the state of Uttar Pradesh, India. It is near the India-Nepal border and is 238 km far from Lucknow capital city of Uttar Pradesh. It has an average elevation of 109 metres (357 feet) above sea level.

The nearest domestic airport is Shravasti Airport (58 km) and the nearest international airport is Chaudhary Charan Singh International Airport (243 km) in Lucknow.

== Demographics ==
Gainsari Village, with a population of 7,116 is located in Tulsipur sub-district of Balrampur district. Total geographical area of Gainsari is 4 km^{2} (1.5 sq mi) and it is the 117th biggest village by area in the sub-district. Population density of the village is 1898 persons per km^{2} . As per the Population Census 2011, there are total 1,054 families residing in the village Gainsari with the literacy rate of Gainsari is 68.3%. Gainsari village has higher literacy rate compared to 40.4% of Balrampur district.

== Transports ==
=== Rail ===
The nearest railway station is Gainsari Junction which serves as local transportation for the residents. Nearest express railway station, Tulsipur is 15 km from the gainsari. The Gainsari Post office is located at Biskhor Road which serves as general post office for the area and nearby villages.

== Administration and Political ==
The Gainsari nagar panchayat comes under Tulsipur sub-district headquarter and the distance from the town is 15 km. District headquarter Balrampur is 45 km from the town. Kotwali Gainsari serves as police administration in the area. Gainsari is also one of the Vidhan Sabha constituencies in Balrampur district. The area falls under Shravasti Lok Sabha constituency of the Uttar Pradesh.

The village was declared a Nagar Panchayat with 15 wards in 2022.

== See also ==
- Tulsipur
- Tulsipur, Rapti
- Balrampur
