= Afroz Ahmad =

Indian environmental scientist

Hon’ble Afroz Ahmad
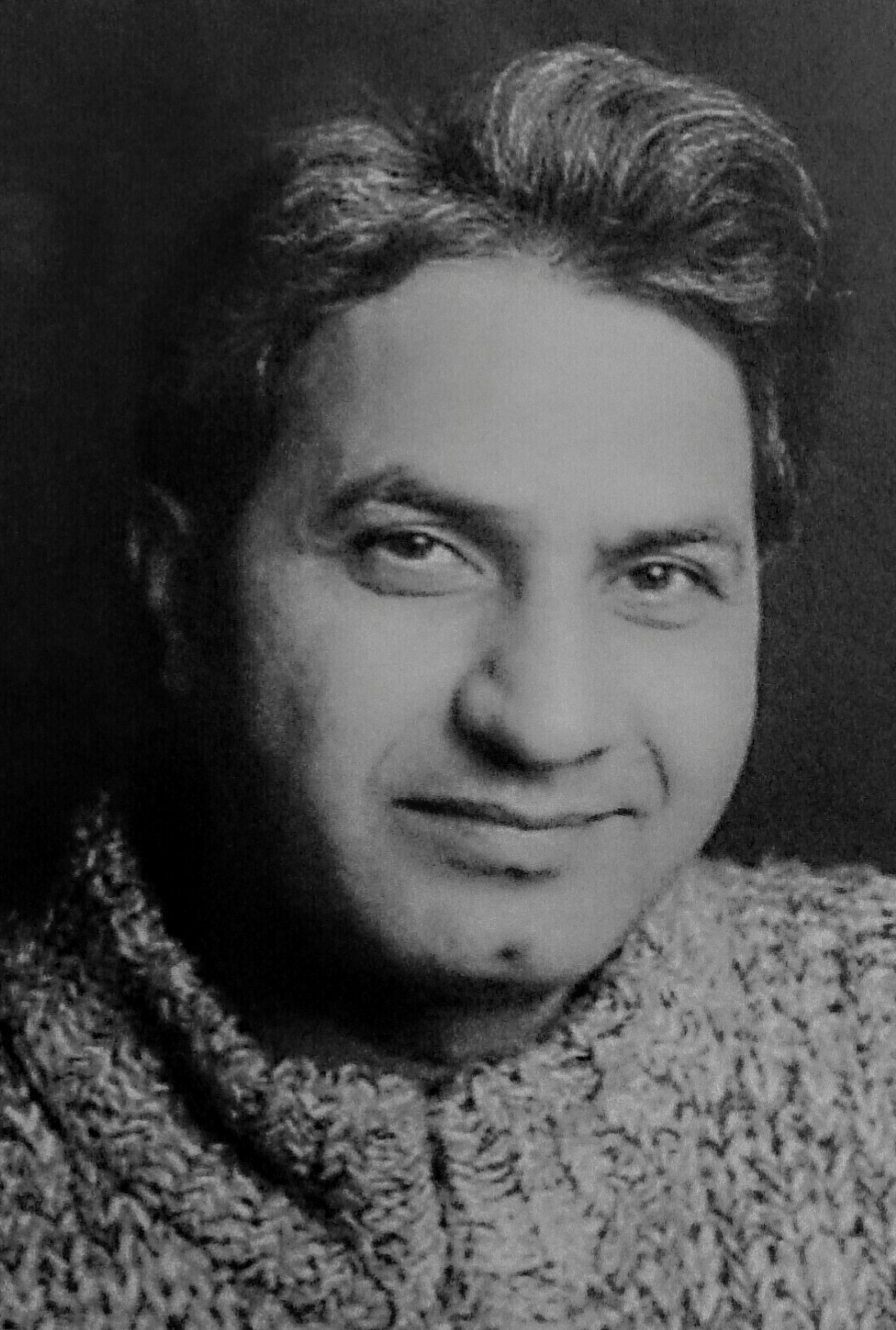
- Born: November 14, 1958 (age 67); Balrampur, Uttar Pradesh, India
- Education: Avadh University, Faizabad; Dresden University of Technology, Germany; UNEP/UNESCO-CIPSEM, Germany; United Nations University- Leadership Academy; University of Jordan
- Occupations: Environmental scientist, civil servant, author
- Notable work: Application of Environmental impact assessment in the Himalayas, Major Water Resources projects in Eastern Uttar Pradesh, Central India. Policy planning related to Human Rehabilitation Displaced Due to major Water Resources Projects on the Narmada River.
- Relatives: Bekal Utsahi (father in law)

Afroz Ahmad is an Indian environment scientist and a former civil servant. He possesses United Nations expertise in Environmental management and protection and Leadership. He is credited for integrating the environment with development and ensuring sustainable development in India.

Before joining the Indian service, he was with the United Nations Environment Programme in Germany. Presently, he is a member of the NGT National Green Tribunal Act- Apex court on Environmental Affairs of India. He was Advisor to the Government of Maharashtra for Environment, Forest and Human Rehabilitations Affair with the Status of State Guest. On 5 December 2014, Ahmad was appointed Member (Environment & Rehabilitation) of the Narmada Control Authority, Ministry of Water Resources (India) Government of India by the Appointments Committee of the Cabinet chaired by Prime Minister of India. Ahmad is Chairman/Member of various high-level national and international committees related to Environment, Forest, Development etc.

== Career ==
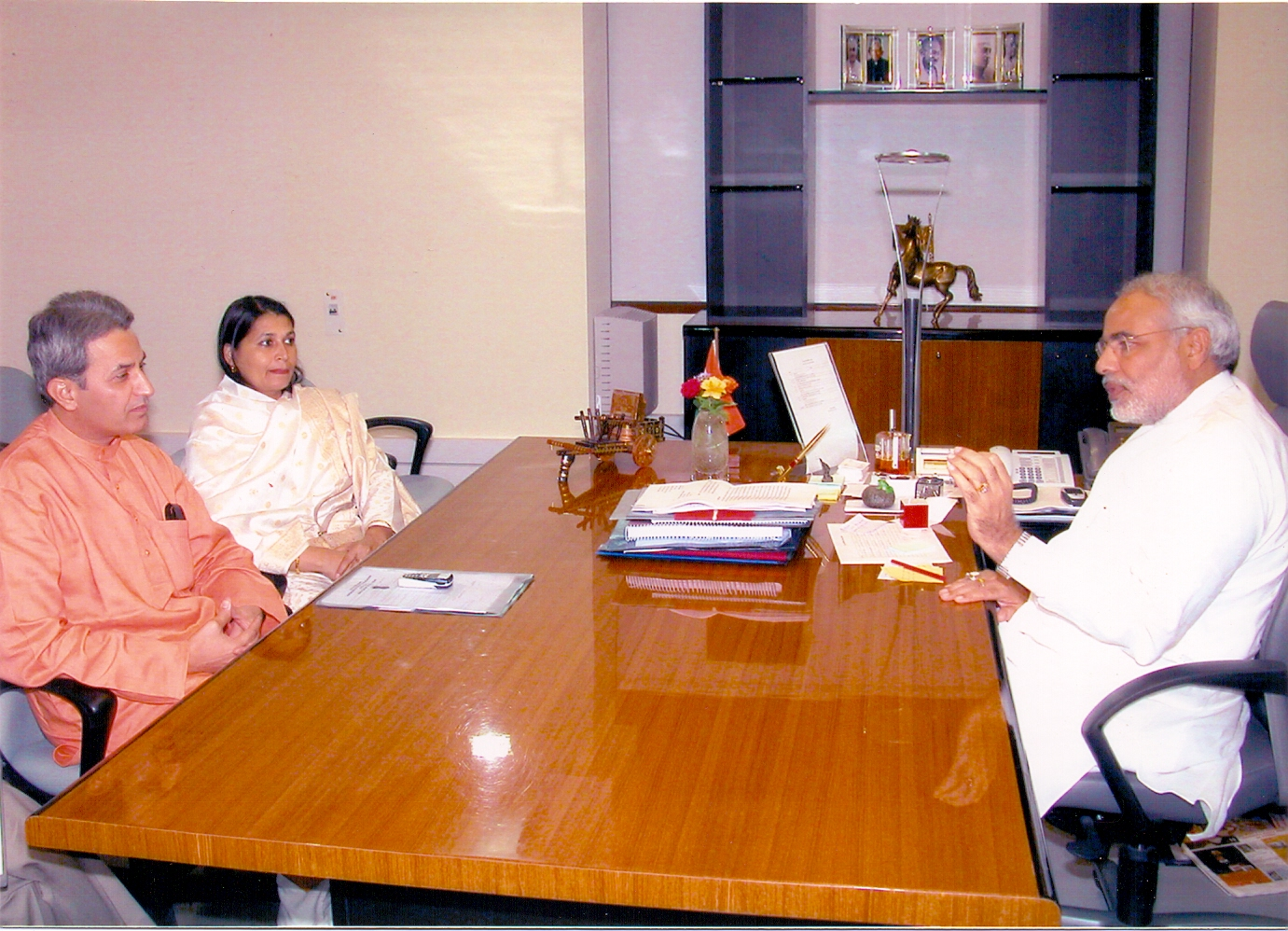
Afroz Ahmad discussing Narmada Rehabilitation issue with Narendra Modi, presently Prime Minister of India on 22 July 2006.

In December 2014, Ahmad was appointed Member (Environment & Rehabilitation) in the Narmada Control Authority, Ministry of Water Resources, River Development and Ganga Rejuvenation within the government of India. Before assuming charge as Member, he was Director (Impact Assessment & Rehabilitation) in the Narmada Control Authority.

Ahmad has also worked for the G. B. Pant Institute of Himalayan Environment and Development, Ministry of Environment and Forests (India).

== Personal life ==
Afroz Ahmad married Begum Sadiya Yasmin (Afroz), daughter of poet and politician Bekal Utsahi. Sadiya is a poet and social worker. He has two sons, physician Dr. Mohamid Afroz Khan and politician from Bhartiya Janata Party Samman Afroz Khan who was Member(State Minister) Minorities Commission

== Publications ==
Ahmad is the author of over 100 research papers, articles and reports on environmental management, sustainable development, policy planning, and human rehabilitation, including three papers published by The Royal Swedish Academy of Sciences. Some notable publications are:

- Assessment of Environmental Impacts of Sarda Sahayak Canal Irrigation Project of Uttar Pradesh Government, India. Int. J.Environmental Studies, ENGLAND, Vol.28, 123–130, 1986.
- Environmental impacts evaluation of Gandak Canal Irrigation Project of Eastern U.P., India and Guidelines for its Management. Int. J. Environmental studies, ENGLAND, Vol.32, pp. 137–149, 1988.
- Analysis of Himalayan Environmental Problems and Guidelines with special emphasis on Application of Environmental Impact Assessment (EIA) for the Planning, Management and for sustainable development. The Environmentalist, ENGLAND, Vol.10, No.4, pp. 281–298, 1990.
- Application of Environmental Impact Assessment in Himalayas: An Ecosystem approach for resources conservation and sustainable development. AMBIO, The Royal Swedish Academy of Sciences (selectors of Nobel Laureates), Stockholm, SWEDEN, Vol.22, No.1, pp. 4–9, February, 1993.
- Environmental Impact Assessment for sustainable development: Chittaurgarh Irrigation Project in Outer Himalayas. AMBIO, The Royal Swedish Academy of Sciences, SWEDEN, Vol.20, No.7, pp. 298–302, November 1991.
- Narmada Water Resources Project, India: Implementing Sustainable Development. AMBIO, The Royal Swedish Academy of Sciences (selectors of Nobel Laureates), Stockholm, SWEDEN, vol. 28 (5) 27, pp. 398–403, August, 1999.
- Environmental degradation and possible solution for its restoration – A case study of magnesite mining in Indian Central Himalayas. U.N. (UNEP)'s Desertification Control Bulletin, No.21, Nairobi, KENYA, pp. 15–23, 1992.
- Rehabilitation of the displaced – A comprehensive Policy Approach. The Administrator, Journal of the Lal Bahadur Shastri National Academy of Administrator, Mussoorie, India, Vol.XLIII, pp. 47–64, April–June, 1998.
- Disaster Risk Reduction through Integrated River Basin Management – Policy Approach, NIDM, Ministry of Home Affairs, vol.7, number 1 and 2 December 2013, pp. 181–198.
