= Daddan Mishra =

Indian politician

Member of Parliament, Lok Sabha
- In office 2014–2019
- Preceded by: Vinay Kumar Pandey
- Succeeded by: Ram Shiromani Verma
- Constituency: Shravasti

President, District Panchayat
- Incumbent
- Assumed office 2021
- Constituency: Shravasti

Member of Uttar Pradesh Legislative Assembly
- In office 2007–2012
- Minister: Minister of State
- Preceded by: Chandramani Kant Singh
- Succeeded by: Indrani Devi
- Constituency: Bhinga

Personal details
- Born: 30 September 1967 (age 58) Kalam Satrahi, Srawasti Bahraich, Uttar Pradesh
- Party: Bharatiya Janata Party
- Spouse: Vimla Mishra (m. 1994)
- Children: 2 sons
- Parents: Aatmaram Mishra (father); Banwari Devi (mother)
- Education: Master of Arts
- Alma mater: Awadh University
- Profession: Agriculturist, Businessman

Daddan Mishra (born 30 September 1969 in Bahraich UP) is a former member of parliament the Bharatiya Janata Party and has won the 2014 Indian general elections from the Shrawasti (Lok Sabha constituency).

== Political career ==
Mishra won the 2007 assembly elections from Bhinga constituency in Shrawasti on a BSP ticket and was inducted in the ministry as the state minister of Medical Education. In 2012, he resigned from his post and all party activities and joined the BJP. He lost the 2012 Assembly election on the BJP ticket.
