= Abdul Mashhood Khan =

Indian politician

Member of the 17th Uttar Pradesh Assembly
- In office 2012–2017
- Succeeded by: Kailash Nath Shukla
- Constituency: Tulsipur

Personal details
- Born: 1 July 1969 (age 56)
- Party: Samajwadi Party
- Parent: Badrujjama Khan (father)

Abdul Mashhood Khan (born 1 July 1969) is an Indian politician and member of the Samajwadi Party. He was a candidate in the 2012 Uttar Pradesh Legislative Assembly election and the 2017 Uttar Pradesh Legislative Assembly election to represent Tulsipur.
