= Gainsari Assembly constituency =

Constituency of the Uttar Pradesh legislative assembly in India

Coordinates: 27.53°N 82.55°E

Gainsari
- Constituency No. 292 for the Uttar Pradesh Legislative Assembly

Constituency details
- Country: India
- Region: North India
- State: Uttar Pradesh
- District: Balrampur
- Total electors: 3,65,598
- Reservation: None

Member of Legislative Assembly
- 18th Uttar Pradesh Legislative Assembly
- Incumbent Rakesh Kumar Yadav
- Party: Samajwadi Party
- Elected year: 2024

Gainsari is a constituency of the Uttar Pradesh Legislative Assembly covering the city of Gainsari in the Balrampur district of Uttar Pradesh, India.

Gainsari is one of five assembly constituencies in the Shravasti Lok Sabha constituency. Since 2008, this assembly constituency is numbered 292 amongst 403 constituencies.

Currently this seat belongs to Samajwadi Party candidate Shiv Pratap Yadav who won in last Assembly election of 2022 Uttar Pradesh Legislative Elections defeating Bhartiya Janata Party candidate Shailesh Kumar Singh by a margin of 5,837 votes.

== Members of Legislative Assembly ==
Year	Name	Party
1967	S. B. Singh	Bharatiya Jana Sangh
1969	Vijay Pal Singh	Bharatiya Jana Sangh
1974	Vijay Pal Singh	Bharatiya Jana Sangh
1977	Vindu Lal	Janata Party
1980	Aqbal Husain	Indian National Congress
1985	Arun Pratap Singh	Indian National Congress
1989	Aqbal Husain	Indian National Congress
1991	Vindu Lal	Bharatiya Janata Party
1993	Shiv Pratap Yadav	Samajwadi Party
1996	Vindu Lal	Bharatiya Janata Party
2002	Shiv Pratap Yadav	Samajwadi Party
2007	Alauddin Khan	Bahujan Samaj Party
2012	Shiv Pratap Yadav	Samajwadi Party
2017	Shailesh Kumar Singh	Bharatiya Janata Party
2022	Shiv Pratap Yadav	Samajwadi Party
2024^	Rakesh Kumar Yadav	Samajwadi Party

^By Election

== Election results ==
=== 2027 ===
2027 Uttar Pradesh Legislative Assembly election: Gainsari
Party	Candidate	Votes	%	±%
INDIA				
NDA				
BSP				
NOTA	None of the above			
Majority				
Turnout				
gain from		Swing		

=== 2024 bypoll ===
Uttar Pradesh Legislative Assembly by-election, 2024: Gainsari
Party	Candidate	Votes	%	±%
SP	Rakesh Kumar Yadav	87,120	46.76	▲7.08
BJP	Shailesh Kumar Singh	77,683	41.7	▲5.09
BSP	Mohammad Haris Khan	16,983	9.12	▼7.69
NOTA	None of the Above	1,364	0.73	▼0.19
Majority		9,437	5.06	▲1.99
Turnout		1,86,304		
SP hold		Swing		

=== 2022 ===
2022 Uttar Pradesh Legislative Assembly election: Gainsari
Party	Candidate	Votes	%	±%
SP	Shiv Pratap Yadav	75,345	39.68	+16.03
BJP	Shailesh Kumar Singh	69,508	36.61	+8.2
BSP	Alauddin Khan	31,914	16.81	−10.43
INC	Ishtiyaq Ahmed Khan	3,984	2.1	
AIMIM	Shahabuddin	3,398	1.79	+0.18
NOTA	None of the above	1,744	0.92	−0.07
Majority		5,837	3.07	+1.9
Turnout		189,885	51.94	−4.13
SP gain from BJP		Swing		

=== 2017 ===
2017 Uttar Pradesh Legislative Assembly election: Gainsari
Party	Candidate	Votes	%	±%
BJP	Shailesh Kumar Singh	55,716	28.41	
BSP	Alauddin	53,413	27.24	
SP	Shiv Pratap Yadav	46,378	23.65	
Independent	Anurag	27,652	14.1	
AIMIM	Manzoor Alam Khan	3,160	1.61	
NOTA	None of the above	1,914	0.99	
Majority		2,303	1.17	
Turnout		196,103	56.07	
BJP hold		Swing		

== See also ==
- Balrampur district, Uttar Pradesh
- List of constituencies of the Uttar Pradesh Legislative Assembly
