= Ganeshpur, Pachperwa =

Village in Uttar Pradesh, India

Ganeshpur
- Village & Market
- Interactive map of Ganeshpur
- Country: India
- State: Uttar Pradesh
- District: Balrampur
- Tehsil: Tulsipur

Population (2011)
  - Total: 2,939

Ganeshpur is a village and market in Pachperwa block in Balrampur district, Uttar Pradesh state of India.
