= Dr. Ram Manohar Lohia Avadh University =

Public University in Ayodhya

- University seal
- Other name: Avadh University
- Motto: ज्योतिषां ज्योतिरेकम्
- Motto in English: Dedicated to Truth
- Type: State university
- Established: 4 March 1975; 51 years ago
- Accreditation: NAAC B
- Affiliations: UGC
- Chancellor: Governor of Uttar Pradesh
- Vice-Chancellor: Bijendra Singh
- Faculty: 250+
- Students: 2,665
- Location: Ayodhya, Ayodhya district, Uttar Pradesh, India; 26.75369°N 82.14267°E
- Campus: 112.24 acres (45.42 ha); Urban
- Website: www.rmlau.ac.in

Dr. Ram Manohar Lohia Avadh University, commonly known as Avadh University, is a state university located in Ayodhya city, Ayodhya district, Uttar Pradesh, India. It was established in 1975 by the government of Uttar Pradesh. Presently, the university is catering education to about 5 lakhs regular/private students through its nine residential PG departments and on campus Institute of Engineering along-with more than 600 affiliated colleges.

== History ==
The government of Uttar Pradesh, established Avadh University, Faizabad, initially as an affiliating university by its notification no. 1192/fifteen-10-46(6)-1975 dated 4 March 1975 and appointed Prof. (Dr.) Surendra Singh as the first Vice chancellor. In 1993–94, it was renamed as Dr. Ram Manohar Lohia Avadh University in the memoriam of late Dr. Ram Manohar Lohia, a socio-economic ideologue and freedom fighter.

The university initially started its office in a rental building at Civil Lines, Faizabad. Land acquisition process for varsity's formal office started in 1976. Ultimately, the then chancellor and governor of the state Shri G.D. Tapase laid foundation of the present administrative building of the varsity on 2 May 1978.

The university assumed the shape of an affiliating cum residential varsity in April 1984. The residential segment became functional with the opening of four PG departments in the campus viz. History, Culture & Archaeology, Economics & Rural Development, Mathematics & Statistics and Physics & Electronics. Four more departments viz. M.B.A, Bio-Chemistry, Microbiology and Environmental Sciences were added to its academic paraphernalia in 1993-94 which in turn brought recognition of the varsity under 12B scheme of U.G.C.

In 2000–01, Institute of Engineering & Technology was established on the campus with B.Tech. (in Mechanical Engineering, Information Technology, Computer Science and Engineering and Electronics & Communication Engineering) and M.C.A. courses. In the same year, some other courses like M.C.J., M.S.W., B.Lib. and M.Lib. were also added to widen the academic spectrum of the residential setup. In addition, a number of PG programs like M.Sc-Biotechnology, M.T.A., M.P.Ed., M.Ed. and UG programs like B.B.A., B.C.A. and B.P.Ed. became functional on the campus from the session 2005–06.

The Sardar Patel Centre for National Integration has been established with the vision and mission of creating awareness towards integrating all cross sections of people, culturally and politically. Centre was established in 2020, where in three post-graduate degree programs are successfully running as mentioned in Governance and public policy, Strategic Studies and International Relations.

== Campus and infrastructure ==
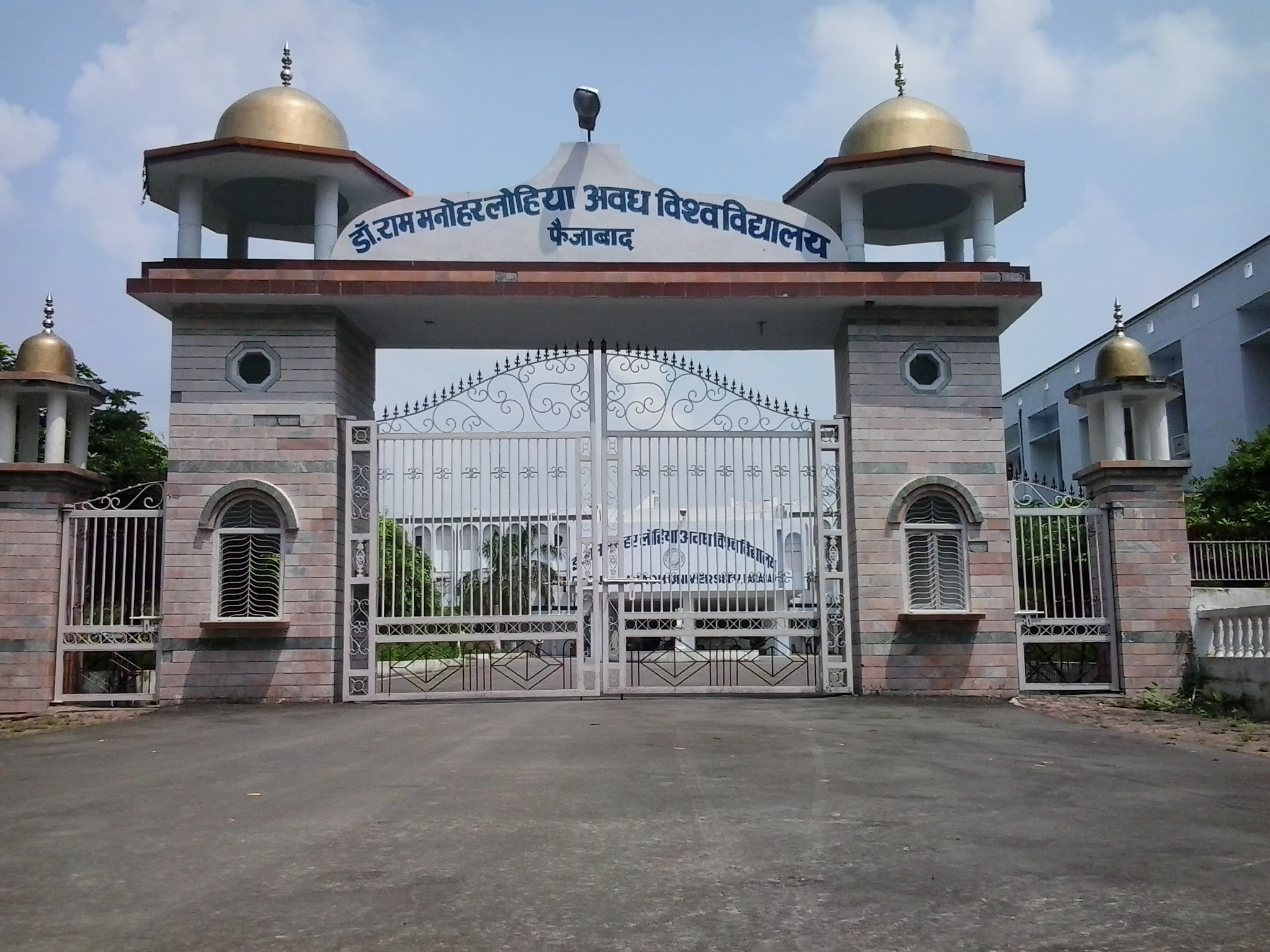
Front Gate of Awadh University

The university is spread over an area of 112.24 acres. It has 23 buildings which include the administration building, Kautilya administration building, examination building, Swami Vivekananda auditorium, health centre, central library, entrance examination cell, physics and electronics building, guest house and IT centre. It has two boys' and two girls' hostels and faculty housing.

== Departments and institutes ==
- Sardar Patel Centre For National Integration
- Institute of Engineering and Technology (IET), established in 2000, imparting B.Tech and M.Tech degrees in various engineering areas, as well as MCA.
- Department of Business Management and Entrepreneurship
- Department Of Mass Communication & Journalism (B.Voc Mass communication and MA Mass communication are ug and pg courses running in department)
- Department of Physics and Electronics
- Department of Mathematics and Statistics
- Department of Biochemistry
- Department of Microbiology
- Department of Environmental Sciences
- Department of Economics and Rural Development
- Department of History Culture & Archaeology
- Department of Adult, Continuing and Extension Education
- Department of Social Work
- Department of Physical Education

== Affiliated colleges ==
Avadh University has 134 degree colleges affiliated to it. They fall in the following zones: Ambedkar Nagar, Amethi, Ayodhya district, Bahraich, Balrampur, Barabanki, Farrukhabad, Firozabad, Gonda, Lucknow, Pratapgarh, Raebareli, Shravasti, Sultanpur.

== Notable alumni ==
- Afroz Ahmad
- Anupam Shyam
- Indrajeet Patel
- Brij Bhushan Sharan Singh
- Jitender Singh Tomar
- Sanjaya Sinh
- Hari Om Pandey
- Savitri Bai Phule
- Lallu Singh
- R. K. Chaudhary
- Ram Shiromani Verma
- Shah Alam (filmmaker)
- Manish Rawat
- Jagdambika Pal
- Ameeta Singh
- Anupama Jaiswal
- Krishna Raj
- Deepak Singh (politician)
- Vinay Kumar Pandey
- Daddan Mishra
- Sanghmitra Maurya
