= Sohaon =

- town
- Location in Uttar Pradesh, India
- Coordinates: 25°45′30″N 84°8′56″E
- Country: India
- State: Uttar Pradesh
- District: Ballia District
- Pincode: 277504

Area
  - Total: 3.1832 km^{2} (1.2290 sq mi)

Population (2011)
  - Total: 6,276
  - Density: 1,972/km^{2} (5,106/sq mi)

Languages
  - Official: Bhojpuri, Hindi
- Time zone: UTC+5:30 (IST)
- Vehicle registration: UP-60
- Nearest city: Ballia
- Lok Sabha constituency: Azamgarh (Lok Sabha constituency)
- Website: ballia.nic.in

Sohaon is a town in Ballia district of Azamgarh division in Uttar Pradesh state in western India.

== Town ==
Located on the northern bank of the Ganges River, Ballia is an economic and transportation spot on the border between Uttar Pradesh and Bihar in northern India. Local tradition holds that the city was established by saints who named it Ballia. The city's culture shows influence from Buddhism and Islamic traditions. It hosts a cattle fair, Dadri Mela, held in autumn, which is recorded as the second largest cattle market in the country.

Senduria (2 km), Amao (2 km), Govindpur Khas (2 km), Baghouna Kala (3 km), Bharouli Khas (3 km) are the nearby villages to Sohaon. Sohaon is surrounded by Buxar Block to the south, Bhanwarkol Block to the west, Simri Block to the east, Itarhi Block to the south.

== Nearby villages of Sohaon ==
- Dariapur
- Harbanshpur
- Tutuwari
- Pahia
- Tal Sayal
- Neura
- Champapur
- Senduria
- Kothia
- Alawalpur
- Surahi
- Narsing Patti Doyam

Buxar, Dumraon, Ballia, Rasra are the nearby cities to Sohaon.
