= Bekal Utsahi =

Indian writer (1924–2016)

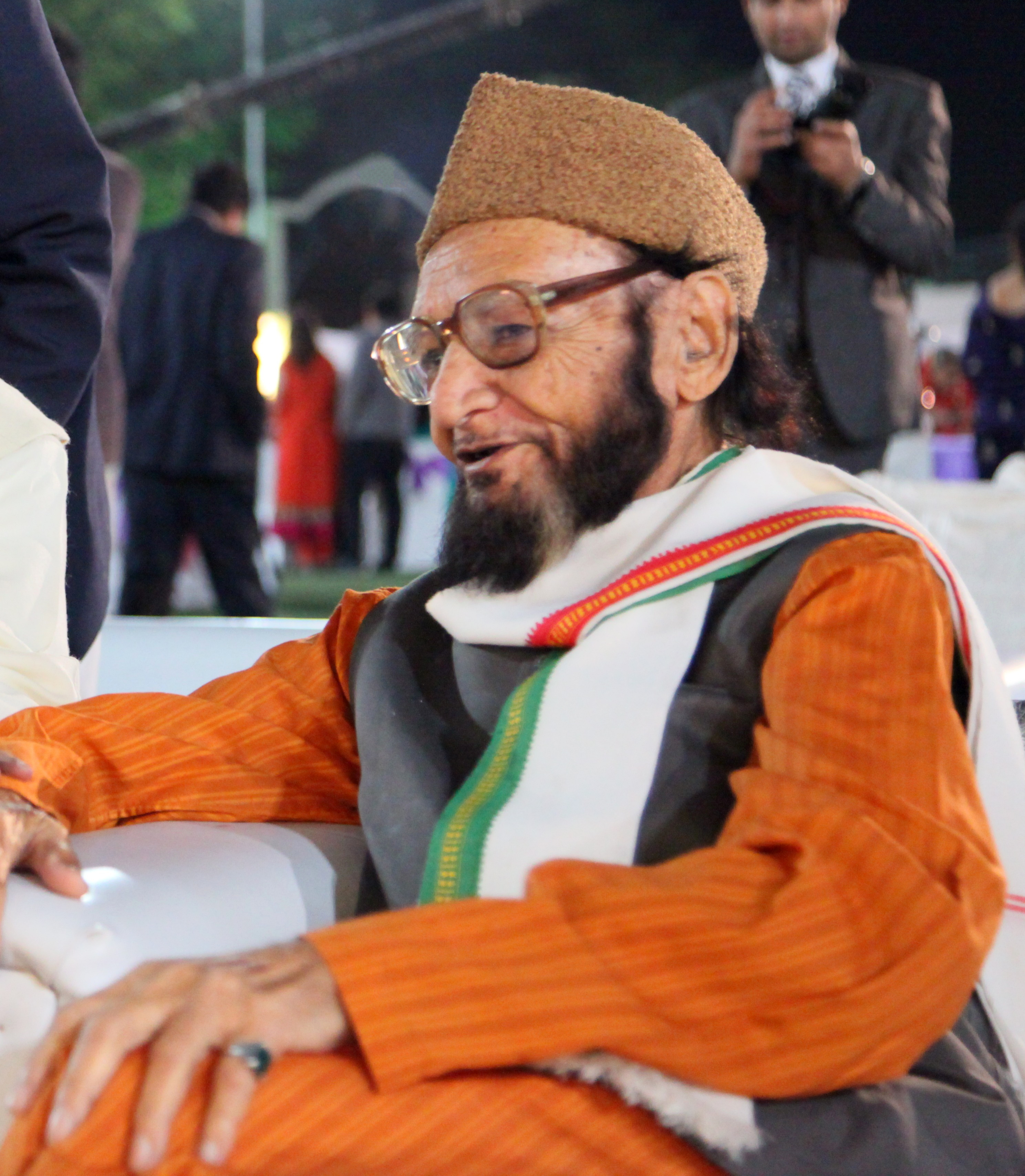
- Utsahi in 2013
- Born: Muhammad Shafi Ali Khan; 1 June 1928; Balrampur, Uttar Pradesh, India
- Died: 3 December 2016 (aged 92); New Delhi, India
- Resting place: Balrampur
- Occupations: Poet, writer, politician
- Organization: Indian National Congress
- Known for: National Integration, Ganga-Jamuni tehzeeb
- Political party: Indian National Congress (I)

Muhammad Shafi Ali Khan (1 June 1928 – 3 December 2016), popularly known as Bekal Utsahi, was an Indian poet, writer and politician. He was a congressman close to Indira Gandhi and a Member of Parliament in the Upper House Rajya Sabha. He received several national awards, including the Padma Shri in 1976 and Yash Bharti.

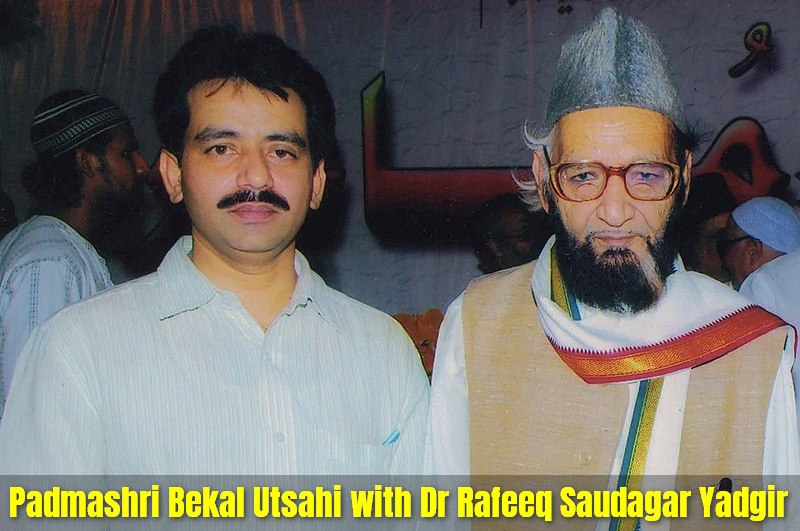
In 2011, Bekal Utsahi (right) with Rafeeq Saudagar (Karnataka Urdu poet) at National Integration Mushaira organised by Anjuman Muhibban-e-Urdu (A.P) at Public Garden, Nampally in Hyderabad.

== Early life and background ==
Bekal Utsahi was born on 1 June 1928 in Balrampur. Mohammed Jafar Khan Lodi was his father.

He was a former member of Rajya Sabha. In 1976 he received the Padmashree Award in literature. During a visit to the Mazar of Vaaris Ali Shah of Dewa Sharif in 1945 Shah Hafiz Pyare Miyan quoted, "Bedam Gaya Bekal aaya". After that incident, Mohammad Shafi Khan changed his name to "Bekal Varsi". During the period of Jawaharlal Nehru in 1952 an exciting event happened, which resulted in the emergence of Utsahi. There was an election programme of Indian National Congress party in Gonda at that time. Bekal Varsi welcomed Nehru with his poetry "Kisan Bharat Ka". Nehru was very much impressed and said, "Yeh hamara utsahi shayar hai". Finally, he is known as Bekal Utsahi in the literary world.

== Politics ==
Utsahi was actively involved with Indian National Congress and very close to Indira Gandhi. In 1982, Rajiv Gandhi nominated him as a Member of Rajya Sabha, the upper house of the Indian Parliament, because of his contribution for national integration. He was also Member of National Integration Council chaired by Prime Minister of India.

== Awards ==
Utsahi received the Padma Shri award in 1976. He received Yash Bharti Award from Uttar Pradesh Government. In 2013 he was awarded Maati Ratan Samman by Shaheed Shodha Sansthan for his services to Urdu literature.
