= Shravasti Lok Sabha constituency =

Lok Sabha constituency in Uttar Pradesh

Coordinates: 27.7°N 81.84°E

Shravasti UP-58
- Lok Sabha constituency
- Interactive Map Outlining Shravasti Lok Sabha constituency

Constituency details
- Country: India
- Region: North India
- State: Uttar Pradesh
- Assembly constituencies: Bhinga; Shravasti; Tulsipur; Gainsari; Balrampur
- Established: 2008- Present
- Total electors: 1,787,985
- Reservation: None

Member of Parliament
- 18th Lok Sabha
- Incumbent Ram Shiromani Verma
- Party: Samajwadi Party
- Elected year: 2024
- Preceded by: Daddan Mishra

Shrawasti Lok Sabha constituency is one of the 80 Lok Sabha (parliamentary) constituencies in Uttar Pradesh state in northern India. This constituency came into existence in 2008 as a part of the implementation of delimitation of parliamentary constituencies based on the recommendations of the Delimitation Commission of India constituted in 2002.

== Assembly segments and serving MLAs ==
Shrawasti Lok Sabha constituency comprises five Vidhan Sabha (legislative assembly) segments. These are:

No	Name	District	Member	Party	2024 Lead
289	Bhinga	Shravasti	Indrani Devi	SP	SP
290	Shravasti	Shravasti	Ram Feran Pandey	BJP	SP
291	Tulsipur	Balrampur	Kailash Nath Shukla	BJP	SP
292	Gainsari	Balrampur	Rakesh Kumar Yadav	SP	SP
294	Balrampur (SC)	Balrampur	Paltu Ram	BJP	BJP

Shravasti, Tulsipur, Gainsari and Balrampur assembly segments were earlier in erstwhile Shravasti Lok Sabha constituency. Bhinga assembly segment was earlier in erstwhile Bahraich Lok Sabha constituency.

== Members of Parliament ==
Year	Member	Party
1952-2009 : See Balrampur
2009	Vinay Kumar Pandey	Indian National Congress
2014	Daddan Mishra	Bharatiya Janata Party
2019	Ram Shiromani Verma	Bahujan Samaj Party
2024	Ram Shiromani Verma	Samajwadi Party

== General election results ==
=== 2024 ===
2024 Indian general elections: Shrawasti
Party	Candidate	Votes	%	±%
SP	Ram Shiromani Verma	511,055	48.83	▲48.83
BJP	Saket Misra	4,34,382	41.51	▼2.27
BSP	Muinuddin Ahamad Khan	56,251	5.38	▼38.93
NOTA	None of the Above	9,872	0.94	▼0.78
Majority		76,673	7.33	▲6.80
Turnout		10,46,528	52.84	▲0.76
SP gain from BSP		Swing		

=== 2019 ===
2019 Indian general elections: Shrawasti
Party	Candidate	Votes	%	±%
BSP	Ram Shiromani Verma	441,771	44.31	+24.43
BJP	Daddan Mishra	4,36,451	43.78	+8.58
INC	Dhirendra Pratap Singh	58,042	5.82	+3.78
CPI	Nabban Khan	12,662	1.27	
NOTA	None of the Above	17,108	1.72	+0.23
Majority		5,320	0.53	−8.24
Turnout		9,97,139	52.08	
BSP gain from BJP		Swing		

=== General election 2014 ===
2014 Indian general elections: Shrawasti
Party	Candidate	Votes	%	±%
BJP	Daddan Mishra	3,45,964	35.30	+27.38
SP	Atiq Ahmed	2,60,051	26.53	+8.15
BSP	Lal Ji Verma	1,94,890	19.88	−6.47
PECP	Rizwan Zaheer	1,01,817	10.39	+8.35
INC	Vinay Kumar Pandey	20,006	2.04	−31.25
Independent	Arun Kumar	10,083	1.03	
Independent	Ram Adhar	6,278	0.64	
Independent	Vijay Kumar	5,542	0.56	
Independent	Prakash Chandra Mishra	4,489	0.45	
Independent	Arjun Yadav	3,730	0.38	
Independent	Tej Bahadur	3,474	0.35	
Samyak Parivartan Party	Saxsen	3,188	0.32	
Independent	Ram Sudhi	2,961	0.30	
AAP	Ratnesh	2,578	0.26	
NOTA	None of the Above	14,587	1.49	
Majority		85,913	8.77	
Turnout		9,80,196	54.82	
BJP gain from INC		Swing		

=== General election 2009 ===
2009 Indian general elections: Shrawasti
Party	Candidate	Votes	%	±%
INC	Vinay Kumar Pandey	2,01,556	33.29	14.34
BSP	Rizwan Zaheer	1,59,527	26.35	11.35
SP	Rubab Sayeda	1,11,247	18.38	7.91
BJP	Satya Deo Singh	47,943	7.92	3.41
PECP	Rajeshwar Mishra	44,691	7.38	
IND.	Vinod Kumar Pandey	14,002	2.31	
Majority		42,029	6.94	
Turnout		6,05,386	43.06	
INC win (new seat)				

== See also ==
- Balrampur Lok Sabha constituency
- Shravasti district
- List of constituencies of the Lok Sabha
