= Utraula =

Utraula उतरौला
- City
- Location in Uttar Pradesh, India
- Coordinates: 27.2931°N 82.3943°E
- Country: India
- State: Uttar Pradesh
- District: Balrampur
- Division: Devipatan

Government
  - Type: Municipal council
  - Body: Utraula Nagar Palika Parishad
- Elevation: 96 m (315 ft)

Population (2011)
  - Total: 32,145
- Demonym: Utraulavi

Languages
  - Official: Hindi
  - Spoken: Awadhi, Urdu
- Time zone: UTC+5:30 (Indian Standard Time)
- PIN: 271604
- Telephone code: 915265
- Vehicle registration: UP-47

Utraula (Hindi: उतरौला) is a city and a Nagar Palika Parishad in Balrampur district in the Indian state of Uttar Pradesh. It is situated in the Devipatan division of northeastern Uttar Pradesh, in the historical region of Awadh. The town is associated with the historical Utraula estate and is known for its religious and cultural heritage.

Utraula is an important administrative and commercial centre of the surrounding rural region. It is also the headquarters of Utraula tehsil, which comprises several hundred villages. The town is situated in the Rapti river basin, near the West Rapti River.

== History ==
Utraula has a history associated with the medieval political and administrative development of the Awadh region. According to the District Census Handbook of Balrampur, Ali Khan, a Kakar Pathan, established the Utraula taluka during the sixteenth century. He died in 1571, and his son Sher Khan subsequently entered into an agreement with the Mughal emperor Akbar, allowing him to retain control of the Utraula estate.

During the Mughal period, Utraula formed part of the administrative territory of Awadh. The historical Utraula estate was governed by a succession of local rulers and landholding families. The Utraula region also experienced political changes during the eighteenth and nineteenth centuries under the Nawabs of Awadh and subsequently the British administration.

After Indian independence, Utraula was part of Gonda district. On 1 July 1953, the former Utraula tehsil was divided into the separate Utraula and Balrampur tehsils. On 25 May 1997, Balrampur district was established after its separation from Gonda district, with Utraula becoming one of its three tehsils.

== Geography ==
Utraula is situated in northeastern Uttar Pradesh in the Balrampur district. The surrounding region forms part of the Rapti river basin and has predominantly agricultural land.

The town is located in the southern part of Balrampur district and is connected by roads to Balrampur, Gonda, Mankapur and neighbouring settlements.

=== Administrative geography ===
Utraula is both a municipal town and the headquarters of Utraula tehsil.

According to the Balrampur district administration, Utraula tehsil comprises 363 villages. It is one of the three tehsils of Balrampur district, the others being Balrampur and Tulsipur.

Utraula development block is a separate rural administrative unit and should not be confused with the entire tehsil. The 2011 District Census Handbook provides a separate list of villages under the Utraula community development block.

== Demographics ==
According to the 2011 Indian Census, Utraula had a population of 32,145, comprising 16,621 males and 15,524 females.

The town had 4,669 children aged between zero and six years, representing approximately 14.52% of the population. The reported female sex ratio was 934 females per 1,000 males.

The overall literacy rate was reported as 71.48%, with male literacy at 76.02% and female literacy at 66.61%.

These figures refer to the municipal town and should be distinguished from demographic statistics for the wider Utraula tehsil.

== Culture ==
Utraula has a mixed cultural heritage influenced by the traditions of the Awadh region. Hindi, Awadhi and Urdu are spoken by residents, with Hindi serving as the principal official language.

Religious and cultural celebrations include Diwali, Holi, Eid, Muharram, Dussehra, Navratri and festivals associated with the Hindu and Muslim communities.

The town is also known for its traditional markets, local cuisine, religious gatherings and community festivals.

=== Religious places ===
==== Dukhharan Nath Temple ====
The Dukhharan Nath Temple is one of the prominent religious sites in Utraula. It is situated in the Gandhi Nagar locality and is dedicated to Shiva.

According to local tradition, the temple is associated with a ruler of Utraula named Nawaz Ali Khan and a Hindu ascetic named Jaikaran Giri. Historical accounts published in local newspapers describe how the ruler arranged the excavation of a mound following the ascetic's account of a Shiva lingam beneath it.

The temple is particularly known for its distinctive, inclined Shiva lingam. According to local religious tradition, attempts to straighten or remove the lingam were unsuccessful, after which a temple and a pond were constructed at the site.

The temple attracts devotees during Maha Shivaratri, the month of Shravan, and other religious occasions. It is also associated with the festivals of Kajari Teej and Nag Panchami. Local accounts describe it as a symbol of Hindu-Muslim cultural coexistence.

In January 2024, reconstruction work on the temple pond was reported to have commenced using ₹1.30 crore from the local MLA's development fund.

==== Jwala Mai Temple ====
The Jwala Mai Temple is a Hindu religious site situated in Gandhi Nagar, Utraula. It is dedicated to the worship of the Hindu goddess and is visited by devotees throughout the year.

The temple is particularly associated with the celebrations of Navratri, when devotees visit to offer prayers, flowers, coconuts and other offerings. It is among the religious sites in Balrampur district visited during the Navratri festival.

==== Other religious sites ====
Other temples and religious establishments in and around Utraula include local Shiva temples, Hanuman temples and shrines associated with the surrounding villages.

== Governance ==
Utraula is administered by the Utraula Nagar Palika Parishad, which is responsible for municipal services and local civic administration.

The town also serves as the headquarters of Utraula tehsil. Important government facilities include:

- Sub-Divisional Magistrate (SDM) office.
- Tehsil and revenue administration.
- Sub-Registrar Office.
- Civil court facilities.
- Police and other government administrative offices.

Utraula is also a legislative assembly constituency in the Uttar Pradesh Legislative Assembly.

== Economy ==
Agriculture is an important economic activity in the Utraula region. The surrounding villages depend largely on farming and related occupations.

The town serves as a commercial centre for nearby rural settlements. Local economic activities include retail trade, agricultural markets, transport, small businesses, construction and service establishments.

The local markets provide agricultural products, household goods, clothing, food items and other daily necessities to residents of the surrounding villages.

== Education and healthcare ==
Utraula serves as an educational and healthcare centre for the surrounding rural population. Schools, colleges and government and private healthcare facilities serve residents of the town and nearby villages.

Residents also access specialised medical and higher educational facilities in larger cities such as Balrampur, Gonda and other regional centres.

== Transport ==
=== Road ===
Utraula is connected by road to Balrampur, Gonda, Mankapur, Nawabganj, Tulsipur and other towns in Uttar Pradesh.

State Highway 9 connects Utraula with Nawabganj through Mankapur. The road network also provides connections to neighbouring districts and regional commercial centres.

=== Bus ===
Utraula has a bus station with services connecting the town to Balrampur, Gonda, Lucknow, Ayodhya, Basti and other nearby destinations.

Public and private transport services, including buses and shared vehicles, are used for local and regional travel.

=== Rail ===
Utraula does not have a railway station within the town. Residents generally use nearby railway stations in the Balrampur and Gonda regions for longer-distance travel.

=== Air ===
The nearest airports serving the region include Maharshi Valmiki International Airport in Ayodhya and Gorakhpur Airport. Lucknow's Chaudhary Charan Singh International Airport provides additional domestic and international connectivity.

== See also ==
- Balrampur district, Uttar Pradesh
- Uttar Pradesh
- Awadh
- West Rapti River
- Shravasti
