= Balrampur =

- Town
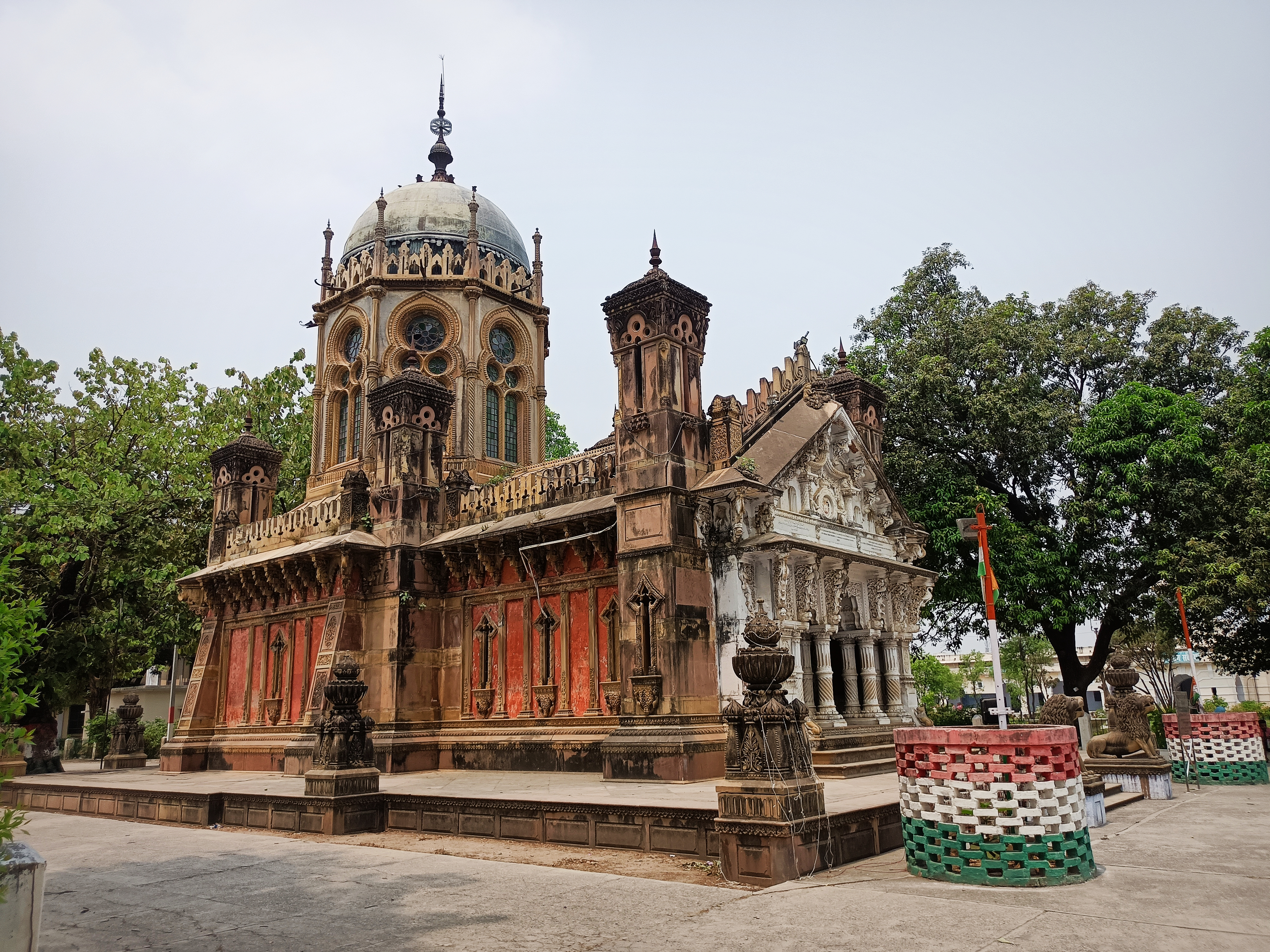
- Maharani Lal Kunwari Post Graduate College

- Location in Uttar Pradesh, India Balrampur (India) Balrampur (Asia)
- Coordinates: 27.43°N 82.18°E
- Country: India
- State: Uttar Pradesh
- District: Balrampur
- Elevation: 106 m (348 ft)

Population (2011)
  - Total: 81,054
  - Density: 692/km^{2} (1,790/sq mi)

Language
  - Official: Hindi
  - Additional official: Urdu
  - Regional language: Awadhi
- Time zone: UTC+5:30 (IST)
- Postal code: 271201
- Vehicle registration: UP-47
- Sex ratio: 912/1000♂/♀
- Website: www.balrampur.nic.in

Balrampur is a town and a municipal board in Balrampur district in the state of Uttar Pradesh, India. It is situated on the bank of river Rapti and is the district headquarters of Balrampur district.

== History ==
Balrampur town is in close vicinity of Shravasti where Lord Gautam Buddha is considered to have displayed his supernatural powers in the spiritual transformation of Angulimala, a famous dacoit who wore a necklace (mala) of fingers (anguli).

In the Mughal era, Balrampur was the seat of Balrampur Estate, the largest talukdari estate in Awadh and the ruler were from the Janwar Rajput clan. Sir Digbijai Singh, Maharaja of Balrampur (1818–1882), was made a Knight Commander of the Star of India (KCSI) by the British for his support in the Uprising of 1857.

== Geography ==
Balrampur is located at 27.43°N 82.18°E. It has an average elevation of 105 metres (344 ft).

== Demographics ==
As of the 2011 census, Balrampur NPP had a total population of 81,054, of which 42,237 were males and 38,817 females. Population within the age group of 0 to 6 years was 10,492. The total number of literates in Balrampur was 47,964, which constituted 59.2% of the population with male literacy of 63.2% and female literacy of 54.8%. The effective literacy rate of 7+ population of Balrampur was 68.0%, of which male literacy rate was 72.3% and female literacy rate was 63.1%. The Scheduled Castes and Scheduled Tribes population was 5,318 and 96 respectively. Balrampur had 12405 households in 2011.

== Politics ==
Before delimitation the parliamentary constituency was known as Balrampur.

Former Prime Minister, Atal Bihari Vajpayee was declared elected for the first time from Balrampur Loksabha seat in 1957. Although in 1962 he lost the election to Subhadra Joshi (Congress). But in 1967 once again Vajpayee emerged as a winner. In the honour of Atal Bihari Vajpayee, a new train Sushashan Express (weekly) has been started which has the route from Balrampur to Gwalior.

Jagram Paswan of "Samajwadi Party" was elected as MLA from 2012 to 2017 and Palturam of "BJP" is the MLA from Balrampur seat since 2017. And Mrs. Israt Jamal (wife of late Mr. Javed Hasan) of "Samajwadi Party" is the former president of municipal board. Late Mohd Javed Hasan is the only person who won the balrampur municipal board three time continuously.

The mayor of Balrampur Nagar Palika is Dhirendra Pratap Singh.

== Economy ==
=== Industry ===
BCM- Balrampur Chini Mills Limited (Sugar Factory), the largest sugar production unit in India, is located in Balrampur. During the period of British rule it was owned by BIC (British India Corporation). Padmashree Minakshi Sarawagi is the managing director and owner of BCM. Bajaj Hindustan also has a sugar mill in the district near Utraula.

== Archaeological sites ==
Two prominent archaeological sites, Jetavana and Savatthi, or Saheth and Maheth, as they are locally known, are located in the vicinity of Balrampur town. Alexander Cunningham used the ancient (6th century CE) accounts of Chinese pilgrim-monks to determine that Saheth-Maheth actually referred to Jetavana and Savatthi.

Saheth, covering an area of 32 acres, was the site of the Jetavana monastery. It became an important place of pilgrimage, adorned with numerous shrines, stupas and monasteries. The stupas belong mostly to the Kushan period, while the temples are in the Gupta style. The remains date from the Mauryan era (3rd century BCE) to the 12th century CE. One of the earliest stupas, contained relics of the Buddha. A colossal statue of the Buddha was also found here which is now preserved in the Indian Museum, Kolkata.

Maheth covers an area of about 400 acres (160 ha), and has been identified with the remains of the city proper and is located about 0.25 miles (0.40 km) to the north-east of Saheth. Excavations have exposed the massive gates of the city, ramparts and also the ruins of other structures which testify to the prosperity of ancient Sravasti. The Sobhanath Temple is located here. The ruins of Maheth includes two stupas. One stupa, known as Pakki Kuti, is said to be that of Angulimala while the other, known as Kachchi Kuti, is believed to be that of Sudatta, a disciple of Buddha. Pakki Kuti and Kacchi Kuti were later converted into Brahmanical temples.

The Emperor Ashoka visited Jetavana, and the Chinese pilgrim Hiuen- Tsang (Xuanzang) mentions two Ashokan pillars at Sravasti. Other places of interest include the Swarnagandha Kuti where Gautama Buddha lived. In Jetavana is also located the second-holiest tree of Buddhism: the Anandabodhi Tree.

== Tourism and culture ==
The district has very rich literary heritage. Famous Urdu poet Ali Sardar Jafri was born here in 1913. He is among the only four Urdu poets who got the prestigious Jnanpith award (other three are Firak Gorakhpuri, Kurtulain Hyder and Shaharyar). The other notable poet of the town is Syed Ali Mehdi Rizvi, very famous for his religious Urdu poetry such as Mussadas, Marsiya, Salam, Rubai, Nauha etc. Apart from extensively writing the religious poetry, his other notable works include poetic representation of History of India named "Matla-e-Watan" and translation of Bhagavad Gita in Urdu poetry. Apart from that the birthplace of Mohd Shafi Ali Khan also known as Bekal Utsahi is Balrampur. He has the distinction of being a former member of Rajya Sabha. In 1976 he got Padmashree Award in the field of literature. During a visit to the Mazar of Hazrat Vaaris Ali Shah of Devan-Sharif in 1945 Shah Hafiz Pyari Miyan quoted, "Bedam Gaya Bekal aaya". After that incident Mohammad Shafi Khan converted his name as "Bekal Varsi". During the period of Pandit Nehru in 1952 an interesting event happened, which resulted in the emergence of Bekal Utsahi. There was an election programme of congress party in Gonda at that time. Bekal Varsi welcomed Pandit Nehru by his poetry "Kisan Bharat Ka". Nehru was very much impressed and said,"Yeh hamara utsahi shayar hai". Finally he is renowned as Bekal Utsahi in the literary world.

One of the most popular Hindu worship sites is situated in Tulsipur about 27 kilometres from the district headquarters. It is known as Devi Patan.

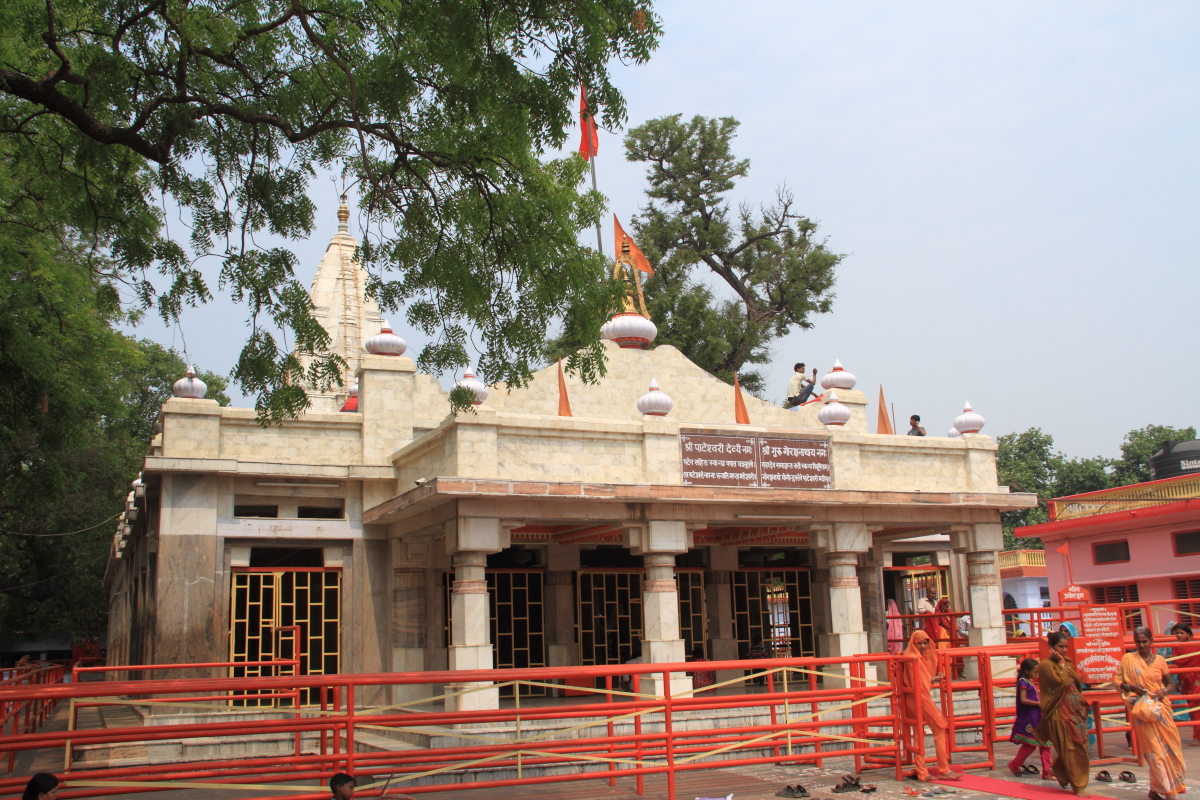
Patan Devi Temple, Tulsipur, Uttar Pradesh, India

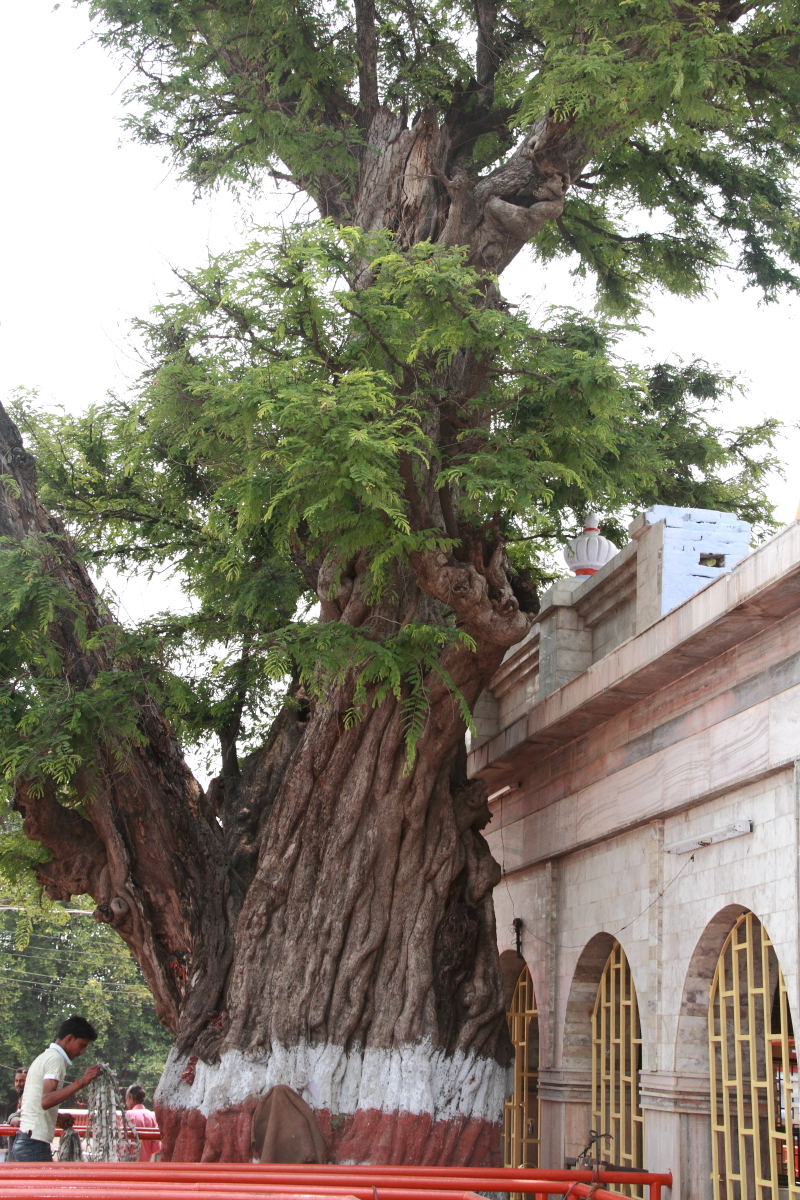
Patan Devi Temple, Tulsipur, Uttar Pradesh, India

The temple has the distinction of having included in 51 "Shaktipeethas" of Goddess Durga according to Hindu mythology. It is believed that during the event when Lord Shiva was carrying the corpse of his wife Sati, the light shoulder of Sati with cloth (वाम स्कन्ध पट सहित) had fallen here. Revered by Hindus in India and Nepal, millions of pilgrims visit this place throughout the year. A Grand festival has been organised at the time of Durga Puja. During the month of chaitra a "Mela" has also been organised every year. One of the salient feature of this event is "Shobha Yatra" of Peer Ratan Nath. Every year devotees from Dang district of Nepal used to come here as an integral part of yatra.

The Devi Patan Siddha Peeth had been established by Guru Gorakhnath of the Nath Sampradaya. The existing temple here is said to have been constructed King Vikramaditya. In the 1lth century King Suheldeo of Sravasti had renovated the temple. The royal family of Balrampur, is today the caretaker of the temple. A large fair takes place in Navratri and every year on Chaitra Panchami the deity of Pir Ratan Nath is brought from Dang in Nepal to the Devi Patan temple where it is worshipped along with the Devi.

Apart from that Bijleshwari Devi temple is also famous among the local people.

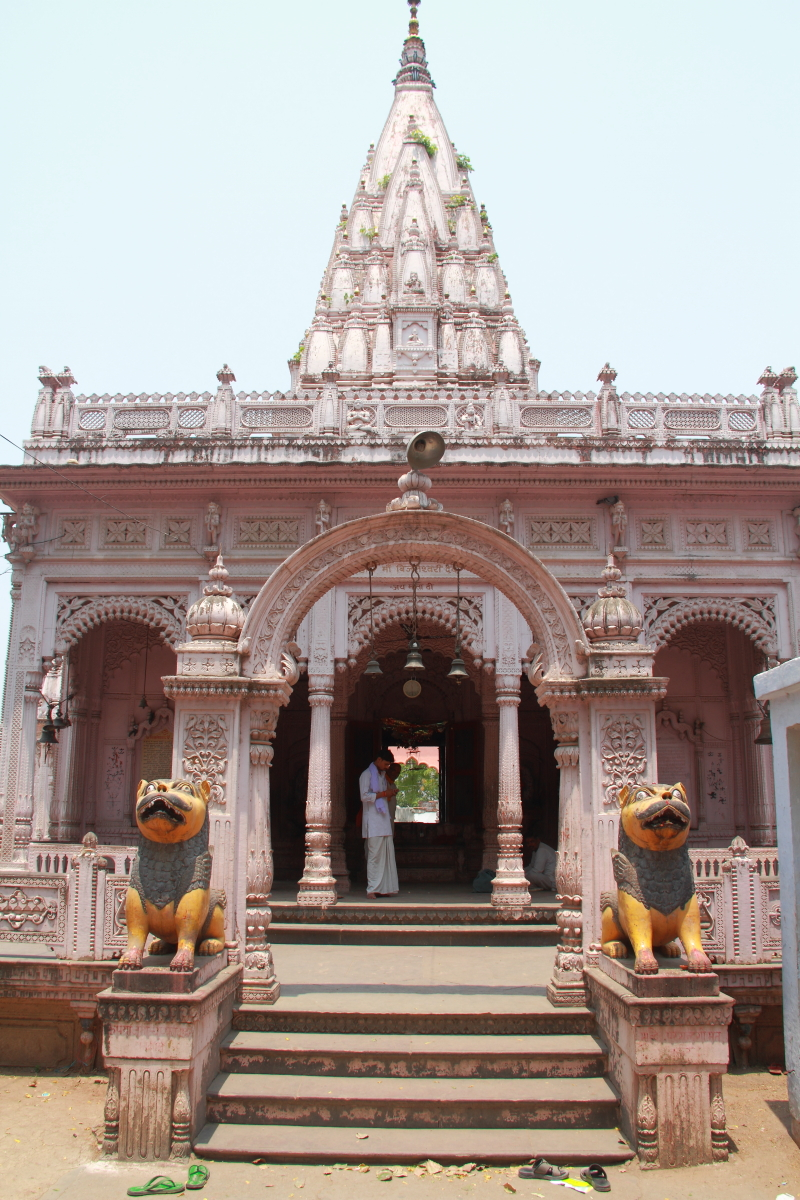
Bijlipur, Dist. Balrampur, Uttar Pradesh, India

The area where the temple is situated is known as Bijlipur. The temple is built by the Maharaja of Balrampur in the 19th century and is a fine example of intricate carving in red stone, which cover the whole structure.

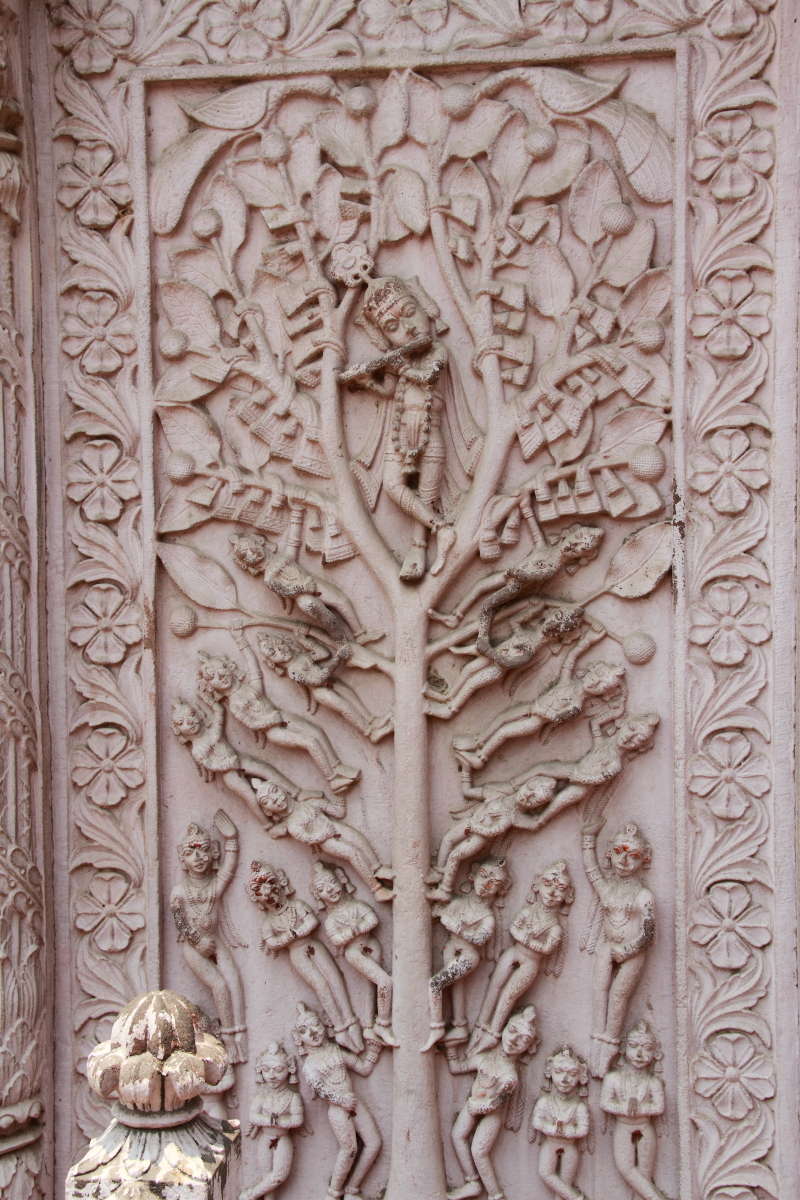
Bijlipur, Dist. Balrampur, Uttar Pradesh, India

The sanctum sanctorum has no idol but a deep covered hole in the ground, where legend has it that lightning fell to mark the spot for the building the temple. It has the distance of about 6 kilometres from Balrampur town. Jharkhandi Temple on the opposite side of Jharkhandi Railway Station of Gonda-Gorakhpur loop line attracts the attention of Balrampurites as well as other people too. The Festival of Moharram is celebrated with full enthusiasm. It is the landmark amongst the Moharram of whole country.

About 17 Kilometers from Bus Stand (UP Roadways) on Balrampur-Bahriach Road (SH-26) in Sravasti, which is considered one of the most important & popular holy places of Jains and Buddhists. The third Tirthankar Sambhavanatha was born here and it was here that he attained the ultimate light of knowledge through meditation. Shobhnath Temple (Jain temple) is also located in the Mahet area of Sravasti at a distance of about 1 km from Jetvan Monastery on the road leading to Kachchi Kuti, & Pakki Kuti. He took diksha at Sahetuk forest (hence Sahet). Few sculptures of Jain Tirthankars in standing & seated posture (belonging to 10th & 11th century) have been found during the excavations of this area. Excavations of nearby area have also exposed the remains of three temple complexes.

The 8th Tirthankar Lord Chandra Prabhu is also said to have meditated here. The birthday of Lord Sambhavnath is celebrated here in a big way on Kartik Purnima (Oct–Nov).

Sravasti is equally revered by Buddhists. Bhagvan Buddha spent 19 rainy seasons (vassa, चौमासे) and gave the majority of his teachings and discourses there, at the vihara in Jetvana, constructed by Anathpindak, devoted lay follower of Bhagvan Buddha. In the recent past, a Daen Maha Mongkol International Meditation Centre in Sravasti, one of the two centers (the other in Thailand), has been established by Upasika Bongkot Sitthipol with the emphasis on education to cultivate virtues, great wisdom, and kindness, giving rise to peace and true happiness in the world.

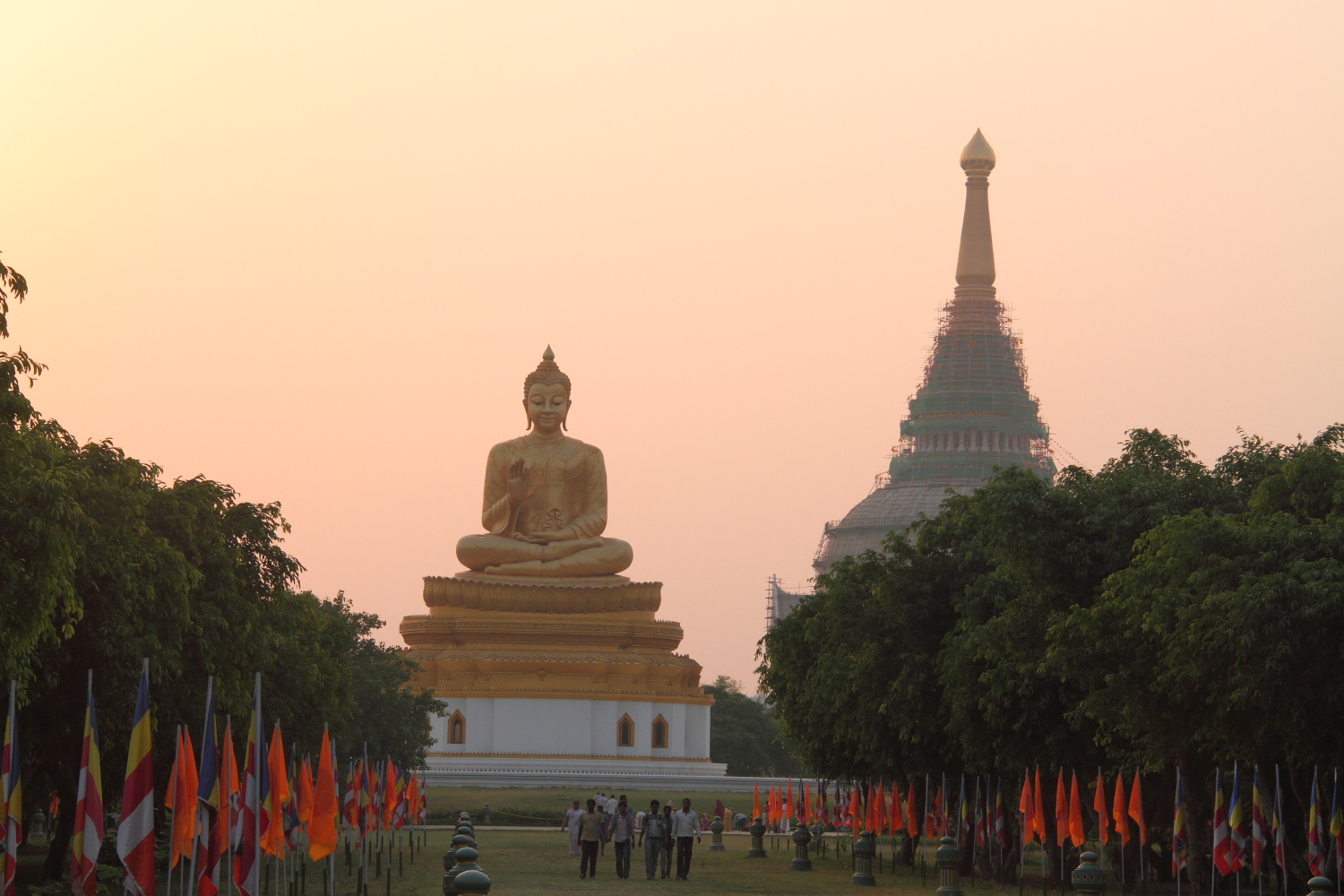
Daen Mahamongkol Chai, Sravasti, Uttar Pradesh, India

For almost thirty years, the training in meditation and wisdom for the public and youth from Thailand and other countries has been provided free of charge by the centre. The centre has six big halls for meditation which can accommodate up to 3000 people, each with the provision of solitary meditation in the huts along with large dining halls for devotees & visitors.

During the British period Balrampur riyasat was one of the important states of Avadh area. The amazing Neel Bagh Palace is also situated inside the town. It is One of the most frequently visited place by the tourists. Presently Dharmendra Prasad Singh is the member of former monarchy. He is also the curator of famous Maharani Lal Kunwari Post Graduate College, Balrampur.

== Transport ==
- Road: Balrampur is located about 160 Kilometers from the state capital Lucknow. The town is connected to Lucknow through state highway 1A. Uttar Pradesh State Road Transport Corporation buses are available from Kaiserbagh Bus Station, (Lucknow) frequently.
- Railways: Balrampur railway station (blp) comes under North Eastern Railway.

== Education ==
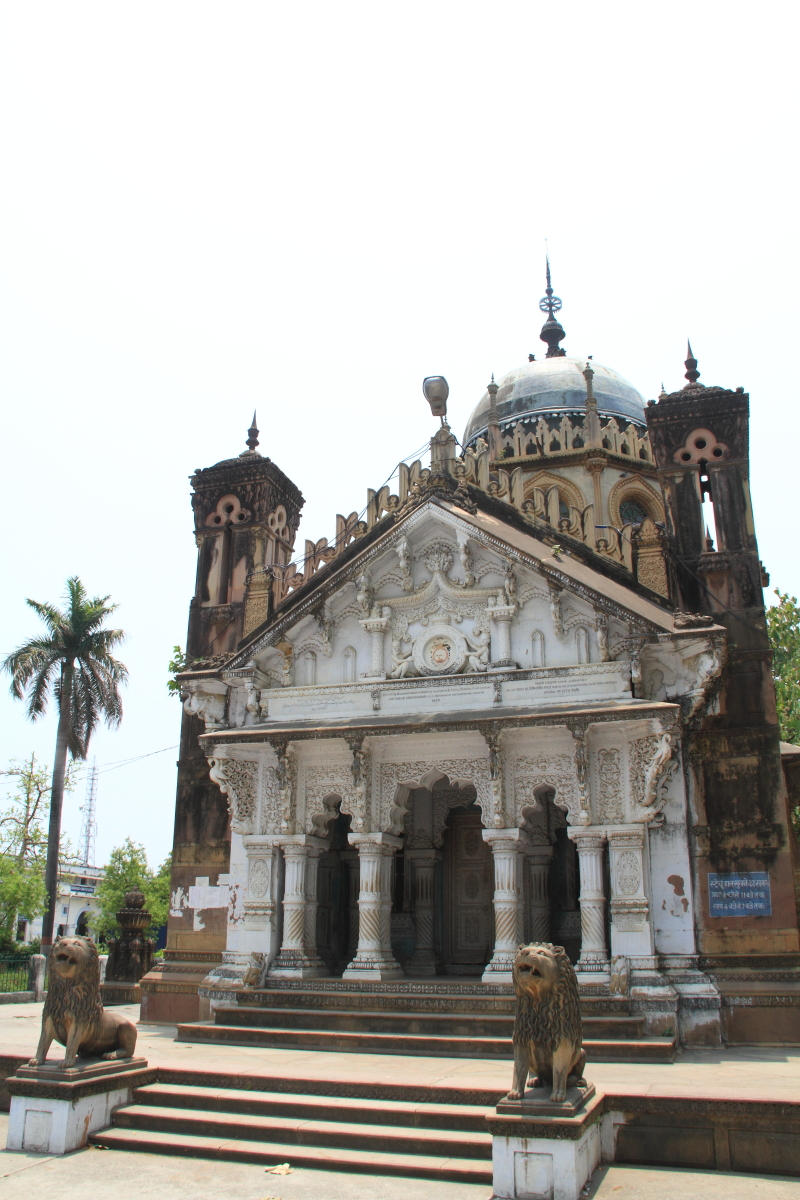
Maharani Lal Kunwari P.G. College, Balrampur, India

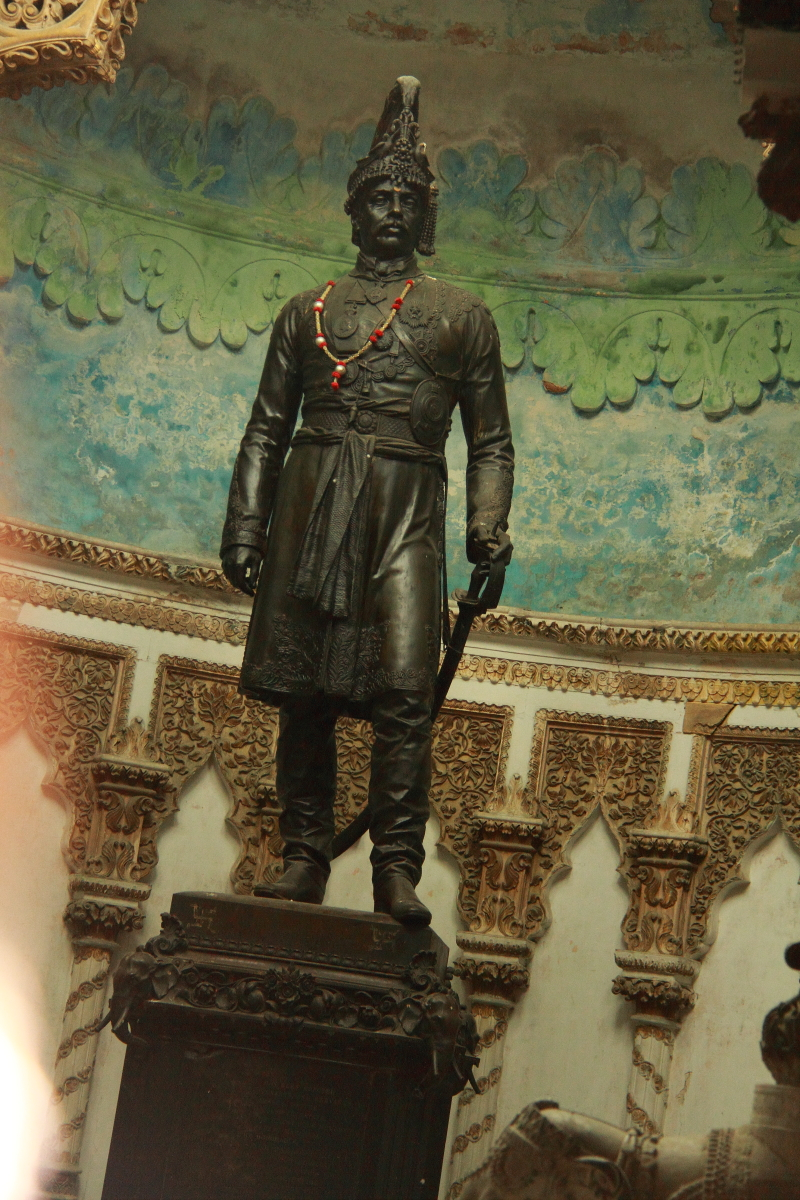
Balrampur, Uttar Pradesh, India

The royal family of Balrampur promoted education in the town and set up the oldest Inter College in 1883. The Maharani Lal Kunwari Post Graduate College (M.L.K. P.G. College) was founded in 1955 with the Maharaja donating the campus and buildings of the City Palace to set up the institution.

== Media ==
Balrampur has an All India Radio Relay station known as Akashvani Balrampur. It broadcasts on FM frequencies.

== In popular culture ==
- The 2023 Bollywood film The Great Indian Family is based in Balrampur.

== Notable persons ==
- Ali Sardar Jafri, Indian writer
- Bekal Utsahi, Indian poet, writer and politician
- Afroz Ahmad, Indian environmental scientist, advisor to the Government of Maharashtra and former civil servant
- Akash Mishra, professional footballer, part of the India national team

== See also ==
- Balrampur gang rape
- Balrampur (Lok Sabha constituency)
- Balrampur (Assembly constituency), in Uttar Pradesh

== Sources ==
- Chowhan, Thakur Baldeo Singh (2018). The Life of Maharaja Sir Digbijai Singh Bahadur K.C.S.I, Balrampur Estate, Oudh. Bloomsbury India. ISBN 978-9387457614.
