= Balrampur district, Uttar Pradesh =

Balrampur district
- District
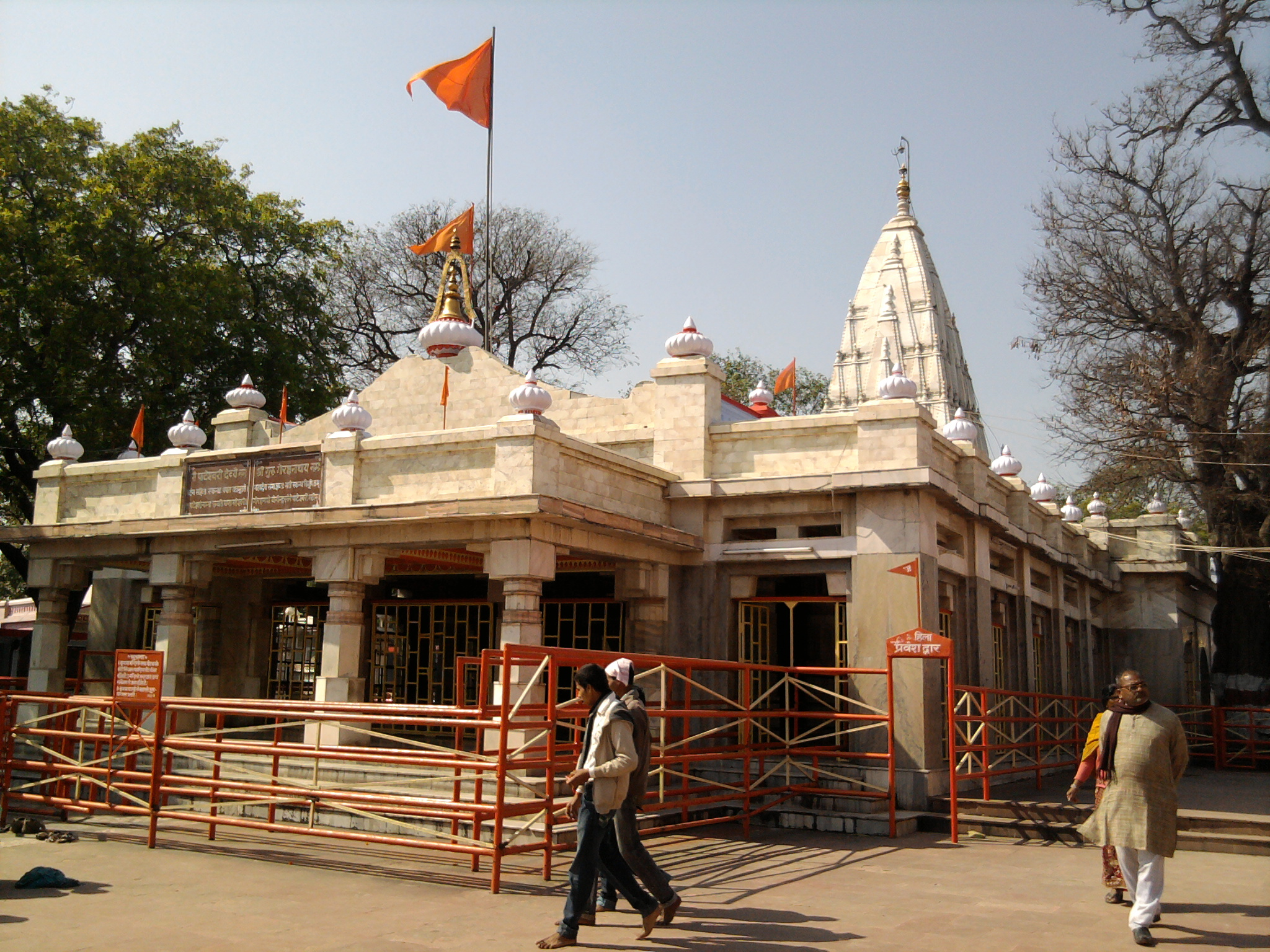
- Devi Patan temple in Tulsipur

- Location of Balrampur in Uttar Pradesh
- Coordinates (Balrampur): 27.43°N 82.18°E
- Country: India
- State: Uttar Pradesh
- Division: Devipatan
- Established: 22 May 1997; 29 years ago
- Headquarters: Balrampur

Government
  - District magistrate (DM): Pawan Agarwal (IAS)
  - Superintendent of Police (SP): Vikash Kumar (IPS)

Area
  - Total: 3,457 km^{2} (1,335 sq mi)

Population (2011)
  - Total: 2,148,665
  - Density: 621.5/km^{2} (1,610/sq mi)
  - Urban: 166,391

Demographics
  - Literacy: 51.76 per cent
  - Sex ratio: 922/1000 Annual Rainfall = 2200 mm
- Time zone: UTC+05:30 (IST)
- Vehicle registration: 47
- Lok Sabha constituencies: Shravasti
- Vidhan Sabha constituencies: 4
- Website: balrampur.nic.in

Balrampur district is one of the districts of the Indian state of Uttar Pradesh and is a part of Devipatan division as well as the historic Awadh regions. It has been cut from the adjacent district Gonda in 1997. Located on the banks of the West Rapti River. Balrampur is known for the temple of Pateshwari Devi, a Shakta pitha, and for the ruins of the nearby ancient city of Sravasti, now a pilgrimage site for Buddhists and Jains. The nearest airport is Shravasti airport 23.3 kilometres (14.5 mi) from the town but it is not an international and regular airport; the nearest international and regular airport is Chaudhary Charan Singh International Airport in Lucknow, 235 kilometres (146 mi) away. Lucknow is the capital city of Uttar Pradesh and is 220 kilometres (140 mi) from Balrampur district headquarters.

== Administration ==
The creation of Balrampur was done by G.D.No. 1428/1-5/97/172/85-R-5 Lucknow dated 25 May 1997 by the division of District Gonda. Siddharth Nagar, Shrawasti, Gonda District, are situated in the east-west and south sides respectively and Nepal State are Situated in its northern side. The area of the district is 336917 Hectares. In which the agriculture irrigated area is 221432 Hectares. In the north of the district is situated the Shivalik ranges of the Himalayas which is called Tarai Region.

According to Government of India, the district Balrampur is one of the Minority Concentrated Districts on the basis of the 2001 census data on population, socio-economic indicators and basic amenities indicators.

== Etymology ==
The district is named after the erstwhile princely estate (Taluqdari) and its capital, Balrampur. The name of this estate was derived from its founder Balram Das, who founded it in c. 1600 CE.

== History ==
=== Ancient period ===
Shravasti was the capital of Uttara (North) Kosala. The ruins of Sahet, ancient Shravasti, spread an area of 400 acres (1.6 km^{2}). Towards the Rapti River, a little north of Sahet, lies the ancient city of Mahet.

Gautam Buddha spent 21 rainy season under the sacred Peepal tree. The famous incident of Angulimal happened in the forest of Shravasti, where the dacoit who used to kill people and wear a garland of their fingers, was enlightened by Gautam Buddha.

=== Medieval period ===
Bahraich Sarkar of Awadh Subah and Mankapur presidency of gonda was a part of balrampur riyasat during the Mughal rule. Later, it came under the control of the ruler of Awadh till its annexation in February 1856 by the British government. British government separated Bahraich and Gonda from balrampur.

=== British and the post-independence period ===
During the British rule a commissionary was made for the administration of this area with its headquarters at Gonda and military command at Sakraura Colonelganj. During this period Balrampur was an Estate (Taluqdari) Janwar Rajput State in Utraula tehsil of Gonda district, which consisted of 3 tehsils, Gonda Sadar, Tarabganj and Utraula. After independence, Balrampur estate was merged with Utraula tehsil of Gonda district. On 1 July 1953 the tehsil of Utraula was bifurcated into two tehsils, Balrampur and Utraula. In 1987 three new tehsils were created from Gonda Sadar tehsil, namely, Tulsipur, Mankapur and Colonelganj. Later, in 1997 Gonda district was bifurcated into two parts and a new district, Balrampur was born consisting of three tehsils of the northern part of the erstwhile Gonda district, Balrampur, Utraula, and Tulsipur.

== Geography ==
The district's northern border with Nepal's Dang Deukhuri District follows the southern edge of the Dudhwa Range of the Siwaliks. To the northeast lies Kapilvastu District, Nepal. The rest of Balrampur is surrounded by Uttar Pradesh: on the east by Siddarthnagar, Basti on the south, Gonda on the southwest, and Shravasti on the west. Balrampur's area is 3,457 km^{2}.

== Economy ==
Balrampur is known for Balrampur Chini Mills, one of the largest sugar manufacturing industry in the country and one of the largest producer of ethanol in India. In 2006 the Ministry of Panchayati Raj named Balrampur one of the country's 250 most backward villages (out of a total of 640). It is one of the 34 districts in Uttar Pradesh currently receiving funds from the Backward Regions Grant Fund Programme (BRGF).

The district comprises 3 tehsils, Balrampur, Tulsipur and Utraula, which are further divided into 9 blocks: Balrampur, Gaindas bujurg, Gainsari, Harya satgharwa, Pachpedwa, Rehera bazar, Shriduttganj, Tulsipur and Utraula Sadullaah Nagar

== Demographics ==
Historical population
Year	Pop.	±% p.a.
1901	529,899	—
1911	533,293	+0.06%
1921	556,274	+0.42%
1931	595,016	+0.68%
1941	649,247	+0.88%
1951	708,839	+0.88%
1961	793,354	+1.13%
1971	892,307	+1.18%
1981	1,085,302	+1.98%
1991	1,368,630	+2.35%
2001	1,682,350	+2.09%
2011	2,148,665	+2.48%

According to the 2011 census Balrampur district has a population of 2,148,665. This gives it a ranking of 210th in India. The district has a population density of 64.2 inhabitants per square kilometre (166/sq mi). Its population growth rate over the decade 2001-2011 was 27.74%. Balrampur has a sex ratio of 922 females for every 1000 males, and a literacy rate of 51.76%. 7.74% of the population lives in urban areas. Scheduled Castes and Scheduled Tribes make up 12.90% and 1.16% of the population respectively. The tribals of this district are Tharus.

=== Languages ===
Languages of Balrampur district (2011)
1. Hindi (87.2%)
2. Awadhi (8.61%)
3. Urdu (4.06%)
4. Others (0.10%)

At the time of the 2011 Census of India, 87.23% of the population in the district spoke Hindi, 8.61% Awadhi and 4.06% Urdu as their first language.

=== Religion ===
Religions in Balrampur district (2011)
Religion	Percent
Hinduism	62.05%
Islam	37.51%
Other or not stated	0.66%
Distribution of religions

Tehsil	Hindus	Muslims	Others
Balrampur	72.07%	27.40%	0.53%
Tulsipur	60.09%	39.44%	0.47%
Utraula	54.72%	44.97%	0.31%

Balrampur district has a Hindu-majority population, but a significant Muslim minority. Muslims are most concentrated in Utraula tehsil and form a near-majority in urban areas.

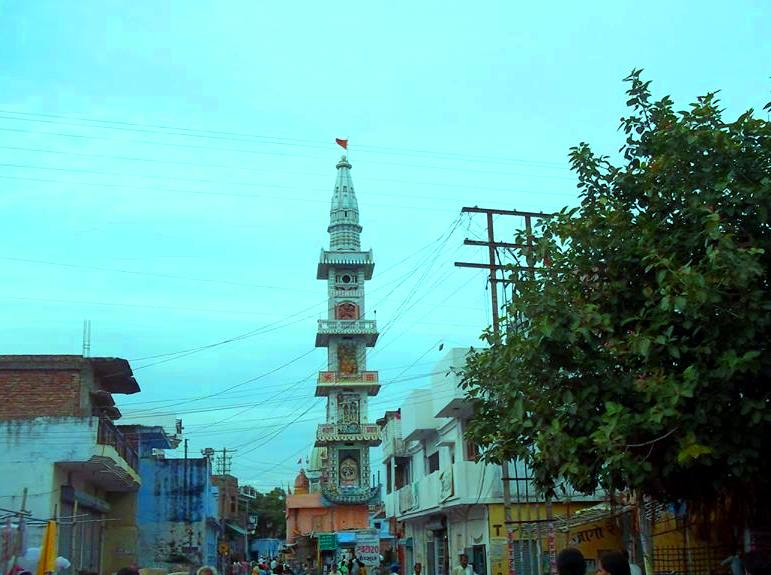
Hanuman Garhi in Tulsipur is the tallest structure in district.

The fortified entrance to Mahet is made of mud, constructed in a crescent shape. The Sobhnath temple houses the great Stupas. These Stupas reflect the Buddhist tradition and boast of the history of the monasteries in Balrampur.

Jeetavana monastery, one of the oldest monasteries in the country, is said to be one of the favourite sites of Gautam Buddha. It contains the 12th century inscriptions. There is also a sacred tree of Peepal nearby. It is said that the tree was grown from a sapling from the original Bodhi Tree at Bodh Gaya. Another site of religious importance in the city is Sravasti. It is said that Mahavira Jain, the 24th Tirthankara of Jainism, 'influenced' this place. It houses the Shwetambar temple.

== Education ==
- Maa Pateswari University
- Jesus & Mary School & College
- Starwards Public School & College
- Adi Shakti Ma Pateshwari Public School
- St. Xavier's Sr. Sec. School
- Fatima School
- Kendriye Vidyalaya
- Pioneer Public School
- Sharda Public School
- Blooming Buds Public School
- Scholars Academy Inter College
- MJ Activity School
- Tiny Tots Public School
- Balrampur Modern School
- City Montessori School
- Sardar Patel Inter college

== Notable people ==
- Ali Sardar Jafri
- Bekal Utsahi
- Nanaji Deshmukh
- Afroz Ahmad

== Media ==
The popular Hindi dailies such as North India Times, Shri Times, Dainik Hindustan, Dainik Jagran, Amar Ujala, Jansatta are available in district.

English dailies includes The Times of India, Hindustan Times, The Economic Times, The Business Line, The New Indian Express, The Hans India.

Urdu dailies includes Inqalab, Tareeqh, Roznama Rashtriya Sahara and so on.

== Tehsil (Sub-district) ==
Balrampur district have total of 3 Tehsils-

1. Balrampur
2. Tulsipur
3. Utraula

== Blocks ==
There are total of 9 Blocks in Balrampur district.

1. Harriya Sathgarwa
2. Balrampur
3. Tulsipur
4. Gainsari
5. Pachperwa
6. Sridattganj
7. Utraula
8. Gaindas Bujurg
9. Rehra Bazar

== Villages ==
- Jaitapur
- Kolhui Bihnouni
- Gaur Ramwapur Born Place Padmashri Bekal utsahi
