= Saharsa–Chheharta (Amritsar) Amrit Bharat Express =

Amrit Bharat Express train route in India

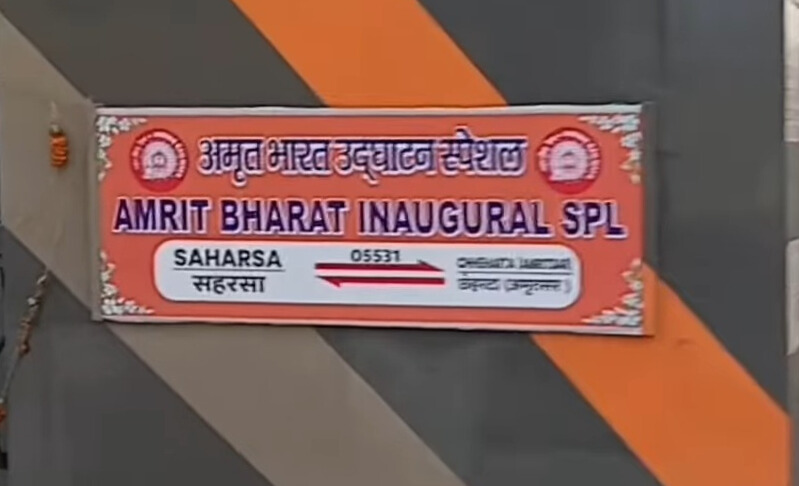

Overview
- Service type: Amrit Bharat Express, Superfast
- Status: Active
- Locale: Bihar, Uttar Pradesh, Uttarakhand, Haryana and Punjab
- First service: 22 September 2025; 11 months ago
- Current operator: Northern Railways (NR)

Route
- Termini: Saharsa Junction (SHC); Chheharta (CIA)
- Stops: 34
- Distance travelled: 1,571 km (976 mi)
- Average journey time: 38h 20m
- Service frequency: Weekly
- Train number: 14627 / 14628
- Lines used: Saharsa–Saraigarh line; Sitamarhi–Raxaul line; Gorakhpur–Gonda line; Moradabad–Roorkee line; Ambala–Jalandhar line; Amritsar–Chheharta line

On-board services
- Class: Sleeper class coach (SL) General unreserved coach (GS)
- Seating arrangements: Yes
- Sleeping arrangements: Yes
- Auto-rack arrangements: Upper
- Catering facilities: On-board catering
- Observation facilities: Saffron-grey
- Entertainment facilities: Electric outlets; Reading lights; Bottle holder
- Other facilities: CCTV cameras; Bio-vacuum toilets; Foot-operated water taps; Passenger information system

Technical
- Rolling stock: Modified LHB coach
- Track gauge: Indian gauge
- Electrification: 25 kV 50 Hz AC overhead line
- Operating speed: 41 km (25 mi) (Avg.)
- Track owner: Indian Railways
- Rake sharing: Yes

The 14627/14628 Saharsa–Chheharta (Amritsar) Amrit Bharat Express is India's 11th Non-AC Superfast Amrit Bharat Express train, which currently runs across the states of Bihar, Uttar Pradesh, Haryana, Uttarkhand and Chheharta of Punjab in India. Chheharta is located in the Amritsar District of Punjab in India.

The train is inaugurated on 15 September 2025 by Prime Minister Narendra Modi via video conference.

== Overview ==
The train is operated by Indian Railways, connecting Saharsa Junction and Chheharta. It is currently operated 14227/14228 on weekly basis.

== Rakes ==
It is the 11th Amrit Bharat 2.0 Express train in which the locomotives were designed by Chittaranjan Locomotive Works (CLW) at Chittaranjan, West Bengal and the coaches were designed and manufactured by the Integral Coach Factory at Perambur, Chennai under the Make in India initiative.

== Schedule ==
Train schedule: Saharsa ↔ Chheharta Amrit Bharat Express
Train no.	Station code	Departure station	Departure time	Departure day	Arrival station	Arrival hours
14627	SHC	Saharsa Junction	1:00 PM	Chheharta	3:20 AM	38h 20m
14628	CIA	Chheharta	10:20 PM	Saharsa Junction	10:00 AM	35h 40m

== Routes & halts ==
The halts for this 14627/14628 Saharsa Junction–Chheharta Amrit Bharat Express are as follows:-

1. Saharsa Junction
2. Supaul
3. Saraigarh Junction
  (Reversal)
4. Nirmali
5. Jhanjharpur Junction
6. Sakri Junction
7. Shisho Halt
8. Sitamarhi Junction
9. Raxaul Junction
10. Sikta
11. Narkatiaganj Junction
12. Siswa Bazar
13. Kaptanganj Junction
14. Gorakhpur Junction
15. Khalilabad
16. Basti
17. Mankapur Junction
18. Gonda Junction
19. Burhwal Junction
20. Sitapur Junction
21. Chandausi Junction
22. Moradabad Junction
23. Roorkee
24. Saharanpur Junction
25. Yamunanagar-Jagadhri
26. Ambala Cantonment Junction
27. Rajpura Junction
28. Sirhind
29. Dhandari Kalan
30. Phagwara Junction
31. Jalandhar City Junction
32. Beas Junction
33. Amritsar Junction
34. Chheharta

== Rake reversal ==
The train will reverse direction in 1 place :

1. Saraigarh Junction

== See also ==
- Amrit Bharat Express
- Vande Bharat Express
- Mahamana Express
- Saharsa Junction
- Chheharta

== Notes ==
a. Runs a day in a week with both directions.
