= Chhapra–Amritsar Weekly Express =

Train in India

Chhapra - Amritsar Weekly Express
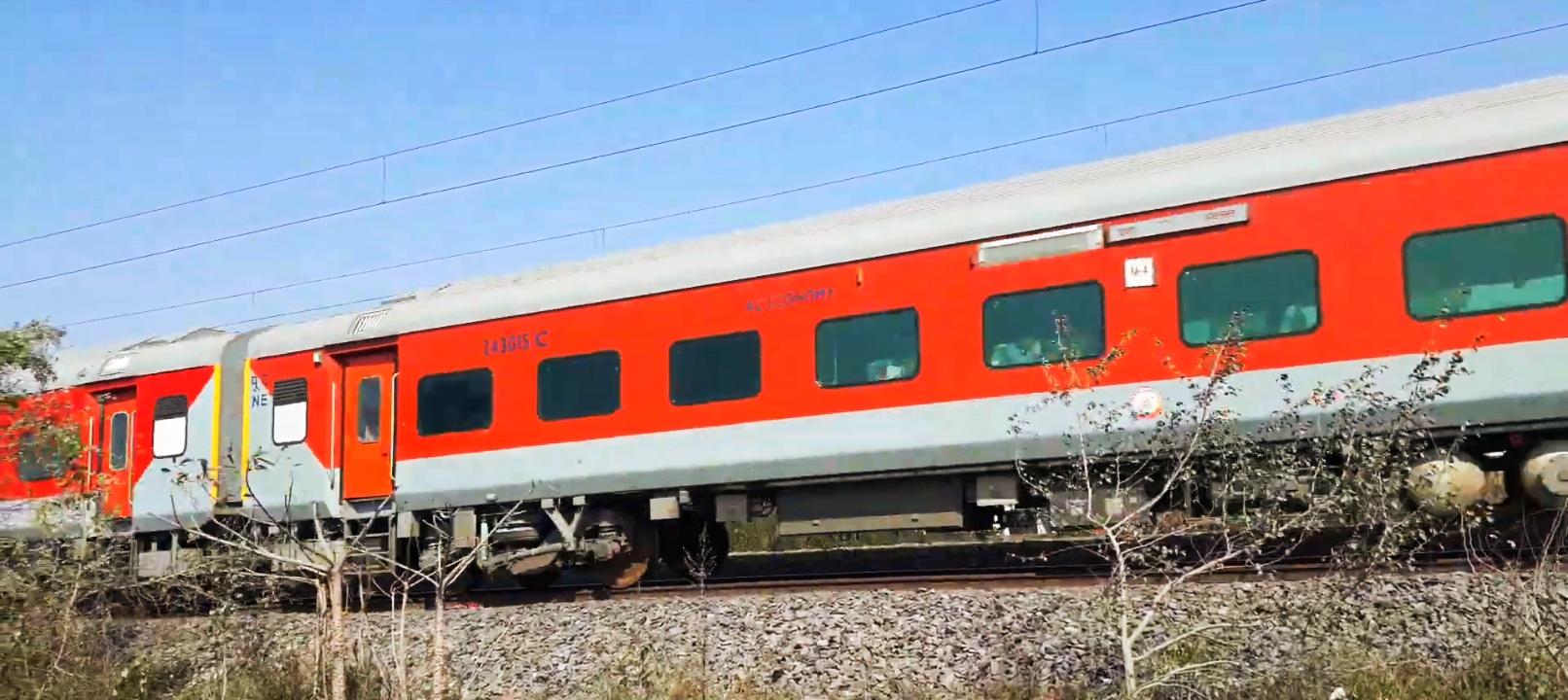
- Chhapra - Amritsar Weekly Express Arriving At Ambala Cantonment Junction railway station

Overview
- Service type: Express
- Status: Active
- Locale: Bihar, Uttar Pradesh, Haryana and Punjab
- First service: 12 December 2025; 4 months ago
- Current operator: North Eastern (NE)

Route
- Termini: Chhapra Junction (CPR); Amritsar Junction (ASR)
- Stops: 20
- Distance travelled: 1,313 km (816 mi)
- Average journey time: 27h 35m
- Service frequency: Weekly
- Train number: 15135 / 15136

On-board services
- Classes: Sleeper Class, AC 3rd Class
- Seating arrangements: No
- Sleeping arrangements: Yes
- Catering facilities: Pantry Car
- Observation facilities: Large windows
- Baggage facilities: No
- Other facilities: Below the seats

Technical
- Rolling stock: LHB coach
- Track gauge: 1,676 mm (5 ft 6 in)
- Electrification: 25 kV 50 Hz AC Overhead line
- Operating speed: 130 km/h (81 mph) maximum, 48 km/h (30 mph) average including halts.
- Track owner: Indian Railways

The 15135 / 15136 Chhapra–Amritsar Weekly Express is an express train belonging to the North Eastern Railway zone that runs between the city Chhapra Junction of Bihar and Amritsar Junction of Punjab in India.

It operates as train number 15135 from Chhapra Junction to Amritsar Junction and as train number 15136 in the reverse direction, serving the states of Punjab, Haryana, Uttar Pradesh and Bihar.

== Schedule ==
15135 / 15136 Chhapra–Amritsar Express (Weekly)
Train Type	Express
Distance	1470 km
Average Speed	~55 km/h
Journey Time (CPR → ASR)	~26 hrs 30 min
Journey Time (ASR → CPR)	~27 hrs
Classes Available	Sleeper (SL), General (UR)
Operating Days	CPR–ASR: Thursday ASR–CPR: Friday CPR - Chhapra Junction ASR - Amritsar Junction
Operator	NER – Varanasi Railway Division

== Route and halts ==
Route and Timetable of 15135/15136 Chhapra–Amritsar Express
15135 – Chhapra → Amritsar (Valid from 12 Dec 2025)				15136 – Amritsar → Chhapra (Valid from 13 Dec 2025)			
Sr.	Station	Arr	Dep	Sr.	Station	Arr	Dep
1	Chhapra Junction	—	10:15	1	Amritsar Junction	—	17:45
2	Siwan Junction	11:13	11:18	2	Beas Junction	18:15	18:17
3	Thawe Junction	11:50	11:55	3	Jalandhar City Junction	18:52	18:57
4	Tamkuhi Road	12:23	12:25	4	Dhandari Kalan	20:30	20:40
5	Padrauna	12:50	12:52	5	Ambala Cantonment Junction	22:35	22:40
6	Kaptanganj Junction	13:30	13:35	6	Saharanpur Junction	02:00	02:05
7	Gorakhpur Junction	14:30	14:40	7	Moradabad Junction	05:25	05:33
8	Khalilabad	15:14	15:16	8	Bareilly Junction	06:53	06:55
9	Basti	15:38	15:41	9	Sitapur Junction	11:05	11:15
10	Gonda Junction	17:05	17:15	10	Burhwal Junction	12:51	12:53
11	Burhwal Junction	18:18	18:20	11	Gonda Junction	14:10	14:20
12	Sitapur Junction	20:30	20:40	12	Basti	15:47	15:50
13	Bareilly Junction	00:50	00:52	13	Khalilabad	16:40	16:42
14	Moradabad Junction	02:42	02:50	14	Gorakhpur Junction	18:20	18:30
15	Saharanpur Junction	06:55	07:05	15	Kaptanganj Junction	19:30	19:35
16	Ambala Cantonment Junction	08:40	09:00	16	Padrauna	20:22	20:24
17	Dhandari Kalan	10:36	10:46	17	Tamkuhi Road	21:01	21:03
18	Jalandhar City Junction	11:50	11:55	18	Thawe Junction	21:40	21:45
19	Beas Junction	12:53	12:55	19	Siwan Junction	22:25	22:30
20	Amritsar Junction	13:50	—	20	Chhapra Junction	23:55	—

== Coach composition ==
Category	Coaches	Total
General Unreserved (GEN)	GEN, GEN, GEN, GEN	4
Sleeper Class (SL)	S1, S2, S3, S4, S5	5
AC 3 Tier (3A)	B1, B2, B3, B4, B5, B6	6
AC 3 Economy (3E)	M1, M2	2
AC 2 Tier (2A)	A1, A2	2
Composite First AC + Second AC (HA1)	HA1	1
Other Coaches	LPR, SLRD (Divyangjan)	2
Total Coaches		22

- Priamry Maintenance - Chhapra Coaching Depot

== Traction ==
As the entire route is fully electrified it is hauled by a Tuglakabad Shed-based WAP-7 electric locomotive from Chhapra Junction to Amritsar Junction and vice versa.

== Rake share ==
The train has no rake Reversal or rake share.

== See also ==
Trains from Chhapra Junction :

1. Chhapra–Anand Vihar Terminal Amrit Bharat Express
2. Lokmanya Tilak Terminus–Chhapra Express
3. Sarnath Express
4. Chhapra–Varanasi City Intercity Express
5. Chhapra–Lucknow Junction Express

Trains from Amritsar Junction :

1. Golden Temple Mail
2. Amritsar–Chandigarh Superfast Express
3. Amritsar–Delhi Junction Vande Bharat Express
4. Nagpur–Amritsar AC Superfast Express
5. Amritsar Shatabdi Express

== Notes ==
a. Runs 1 day in a week with both directions.
