= Chhapra–Anand Vihar Terminal Amrit Bharat Express =

Amrit Bharat Express train route in India

Chhapra – Anand Vihar Terminal Amrit Bharat Express
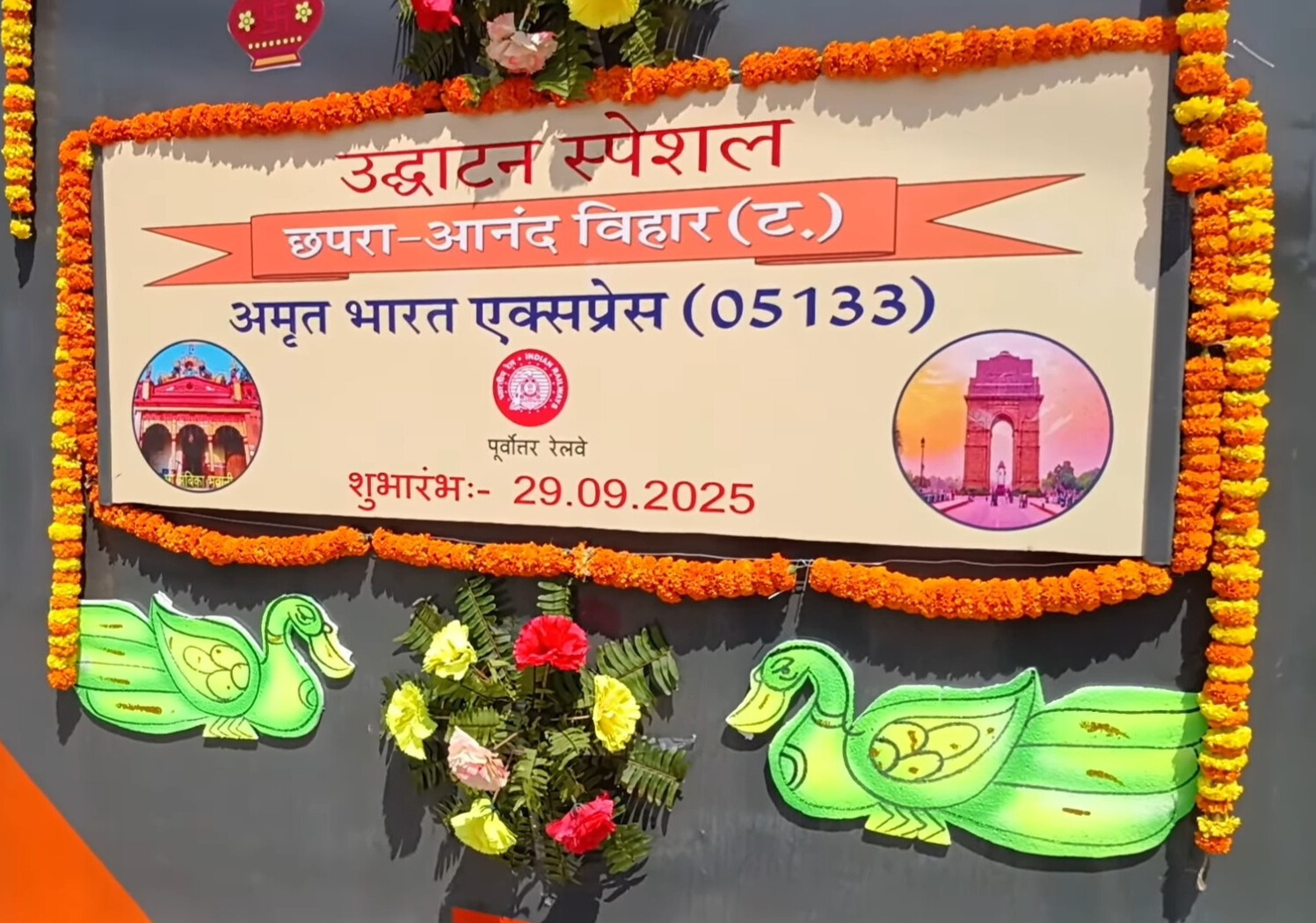

Overview
- Service type: Amrit Bharat, Superfast
- Status: Active
- Locale: Bihar, Uttar Pradesh and New Delhi
- First service: 29 September 2025; 11 months ago (Inaugural) 20 October 2025; 10 months ago (Commercial)
- Current operator: North Eastern Railways (NER)

Route
- Termini: Chhapra Junction (CPR); Anand Vihar Terminal (ANVT)
- Stops: 18
- Distance travelled: 949 km (590 mi)
- Average journey time: 24h 10m
- Service frequency: Bi-weekly
- Train number: 15133 / 15134
- Lines used: Chhapra–Gorakhpur line; Gorakhpur–Kanpur line; Kanpur–Ghaziabad–Anand Vihar section

On-board services
- Class: Sleeper class (SL) General unreserved coach (GS)
- Seating arrangements: Yes
- Sleeping arrangements: Yes
- Auto-rack arrangements: Upper
- Catering facilities: On-board catering
- Observation facilities: Saffron-grey
- Entertainment facilities: Electric outlets; reading lights; bottle holders
- Other facilities: CCTV cameras; bio-vacuum toilets; foot-operated water taps; passenger information system

Technical
- Rolling stock: Modified LHB coaches
- Track gauge: Indian gauge
- Electrification: 25 kV 50 Hz AC overhead line
- Operating speed: 130 km/h (81 mph) (Max. Speed); 39 km (24 mi) (Avg.)
- Track owner: Indian Railways
- Rake sharing: No

The 15133/15134 Chhapra–Anand Vihar Terminal Amrit Bharat Express is India's 13th Non-AC Superfast Amrit Bharat Express train, which currently runs across the states of Bihar, Uttar Pradesh and New Delhi, the capital city of India.

The train is inaugurated on 29 September 2025 by Prime Minister Narendra Modi via video conference from New Delhi, India.

== Overview ==
The train is operated by Indian Railways, connecting Chhapra Junction and Anand Vihar Terminal. It is currently operated with train numbers 15133/15134 on bi-weekly services.

== Rakes ==
It is the 12th Amrit Bharat 2.0 Express train in which the locomotives were designed by Chittaranjan Locomotive Works (CLW) at Chittaranjan, West Bengal and the coaches were designed and manufactured by the Integral Coach Factory at Perambur, Chennai under the Make in India initiative.

== Services ==
Chhapra–Anand Vihar Amrit Bharat Express 🚆
| Train number | Station code 🏷️ | Departure station 🚉 | Departure time ⏰ | Arrival station 🚉 | Arrival time ⏰ | Duration ⏳ |
|---|---|---|---|---|---|---|
| 15133 | CPR | Chhapra Junction | 10:00 PM | Anand Vihar Terminal | 10:10 PM | 24h 10m |
| 15134 | ANVT | Anand Vihar Terminal | 12:20 AM | Chhapra Junction | 10:50 PM | 22h 30m |

== Routes & halts ==
The halts for this 15133/15134 Chhapra Junction – Anand Vihar Terminal Amrit Bharat Express are as follows:-

1. Chhapra Junction
2. Siwan Junction
3. Thawe Junction
4. Tamkuhi Road
5. Padrauna
6. Kaptanganj Junction
7. Gorakhpur Junction
8. Khalilabad
9. Basti
10. Babhnan
11. Mankapur Junction
12. Gonda Junction
13. Barabanki Junction
14. Badshahnagar
15. Aishbagh
16. Kanpur Central
17. Etawah Junction
18. Anand Vihar Terminal

== Coach composition ==
Coach composition — Chhapra–Anand Vihar Terminal Amrit Bharat
| 0 | 1 | 2 | 3 | 4 | 5 | 6 | 7 | 8 | 9 | 10 | 11 | 12 | 13 | 14 | 15 | 16 | 17 | 18 | 19 | 20 | 21 | 22 | 23 |
|---|---|---|---|---|---|---|---|---|---|---|---|---|---|---|---|---|---|---|---|---|---|---|---|
| L | SLR | GS | GS | GS | GS | GS | S1 | S2 | S3 | S4 | PC | S5 | S6 | S7 | S8 | GS | GS | GS | GS | GS | GS | SLR | L |

Legend:

- L = Locomotive
- SLR = Seating-cum-Luggage rake
- GS = General second (unreserved)
- S1–S8 = Sleeper class coaches
- PC = Pantry car

== Rake reversal ==
There is no rake reversal or rake share.

== See also ==
- Amrit Bharat Express
- Vande Bharat Express
- Humsafar Express
- Chhapra Junction
- Anand Vihar Terminal
- Muzaffarpur–Charlapalli Amrit Bharat Express

== Notes ==
a. Runs 2 days in a week with both directions
