= Sahjanwa railway station =

Railway station in Uttar Pradesh, India

Sahjanwa railway station Sahjanwa Gida Gorakhpur

General information
- Location: Sahjanwa, Gorakhpur, Uttar Pradesh; India
- Coordinates: 26°45′49″N 83°12′58″E
- System: Regional rail and Light rail station
- Owner: Indian Railways
- Operator: North Eastern Railway
- Lines: Gorakhpur–Basti–Lucknow; Lucknow–Varanasi; Sahjanwa-dohrighat proposed railway line
- Platforms: 3, (2) proposed after developing as satellite station
- Tracks: 5

Construction
- Structure type: standard on ground station
- Parking: Available
- Cycle facilities: Not available

Other information
- Station code: SWA

History
- Opened: 1980; 46 years ago
Location
- Location within Uttar Pradesh Location within India

Sahjanwa railway station is located in the town of Sahjanwa district of Gorakhpur in the Indian state of Uttar Pradesh. it was constructed in 1980. It serves Sahjanwa and Gida which is its industrial areas located at 2 km (1.2 mi) from Sahjanwa it is located on the Gorakhpur–Basti–Lucknow–Delhi main line on the route of North Eastern Railway.

The station offers class B railway station facilities. The station is 18 km (11 mi) from Gorakhpur railway station and 28 km (17 mi) from Gorakhpur airport. it is one of the ten railway stations of Gorakhpur.

Some major railway stations located near sahjanwa are, Basti, and Gorakhpur. It is directly and well connected by Gorakhpur, Varanasi, Lucknow, Gonda, Basti, Kanpur, Jhansi, Durg, Agra, Barauni, New Delhi, Bhopal, Mumbai, Nasik, Allahabad, and Ayodhya. After developing as a satellite station it will be become major terminating junction for Lucknow–Bahraich–Gonda–Varanasi and south side of Gorakhpur via Dohrighat.

== History ==
The railway line between Gorakhpur–Gonda loop, running between Gorakhpur and Gonda, was constructed by North Eastern Railway between 1979 and 1995–2000.

== Trains which have stop at Sahjanwa railway station ==
There are currently 10 trains that take a halt at this station. They are-

Train no.	Name	From	To
11123	Barauni Gwalior express	Barauni Junction	Gwalior Junction
05106	Basti Gorakhpur Intercity Express	Basti station	Gorakhpur Junction
15203	Barauni Lucknow express	Barauni junction	Lucknow Junction
12531	Gorakhpur Lucknow express	Gorakhpur Junction	Lucknow Junction
55025	Gorakhpur Gonda passenger	Gorakhpur Junction	Gonda Junction
55001	Gorakhpur Ayodhya passenger	Gorakhpur Junction	Ayodhya Junction
19038	Gorakhpur Bandra terminous Avadh express	Gorakhpur Junction	Bandra terminous
19040	Muzaffarpur Bandra terminous Avadh express	Muzaffarpur Junction	Bandra Terminous
55027	Gorakhpur Gonda passenger	Gorakhpur Junction	Gonda Junction
15007	Varanasi city Lucknow Junction Krishak express	Varanasi city	Lucknow Junction.

== See also ==
- Gorakhpur Junction
- Lucknow Junction
- Gorakhpur Cantonment
- Domingarh
- Basti

Preceding station	Indian Railways	Following station
Jagatbela towards ?	North Eastern Railway zone Lucknow–Gorakhpur section	Sihapar Halt towards ?
