= Vaishali Express =

Train in India

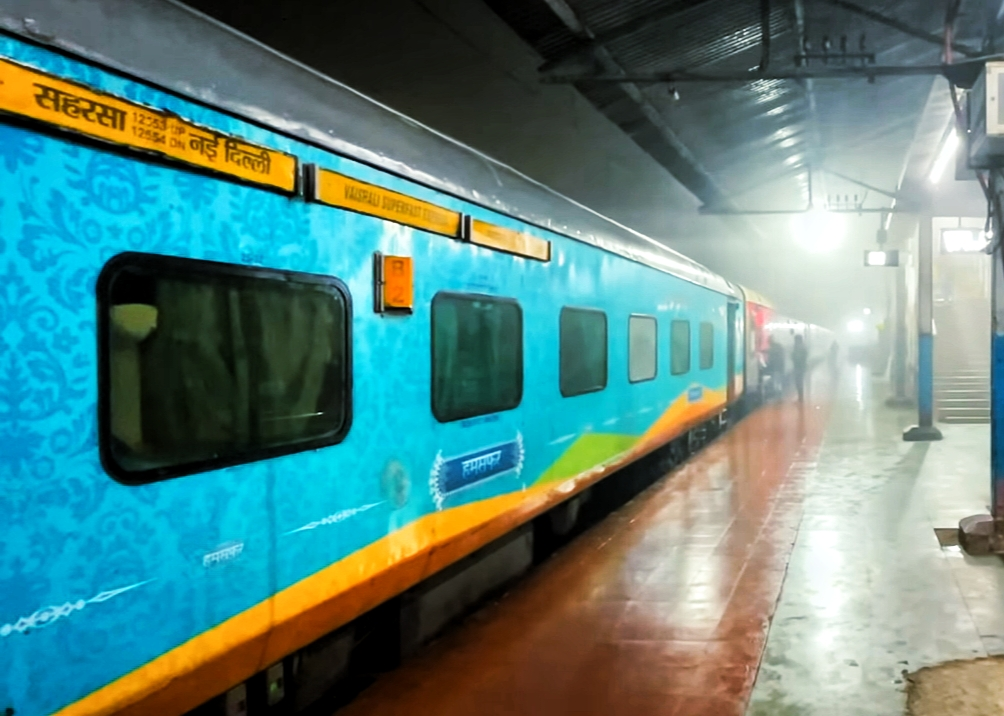
- Vaishali Express At Etawah Junction

Overview
- Service type: Express
- First service: 31 October 1973; 53 years ago
- Current operator: East Central Railway

Route
- Termini: New Delhi (NDLS); Lalitgram (LLP)
- Stops: 24
- Distance travelled: 1,370 km (851 mi)
- Average journey time: 25 hrs 50 mins
- Service frequency: Daily
- Train number: 15565 / 15566

On-board services
- Classes: AC First Class, AC 2 Tier, AC 3 Tier, Sleeper Class, General Unreserved
- Seating arrangements: Yes
- Sleeping arrangements: Yes
- Catering facilities: Available
- Observation facilities: Large windows
- Baggage facilities: Available
- Other facilities: Below the seats

Technical
- Rolling stock: LHB coach
- Track gauge: Broad Gauge
- Operating speed: 55 km/h (34 mph) average including halts.

The 15565 / 15566 Vaishali Express is an express train operated by East Central Railway zone, that running between New Delhi in Delhi and Lalitgram in Bihar, India. It is known for serving the northern part of Bihar and connecting it to the national capital.

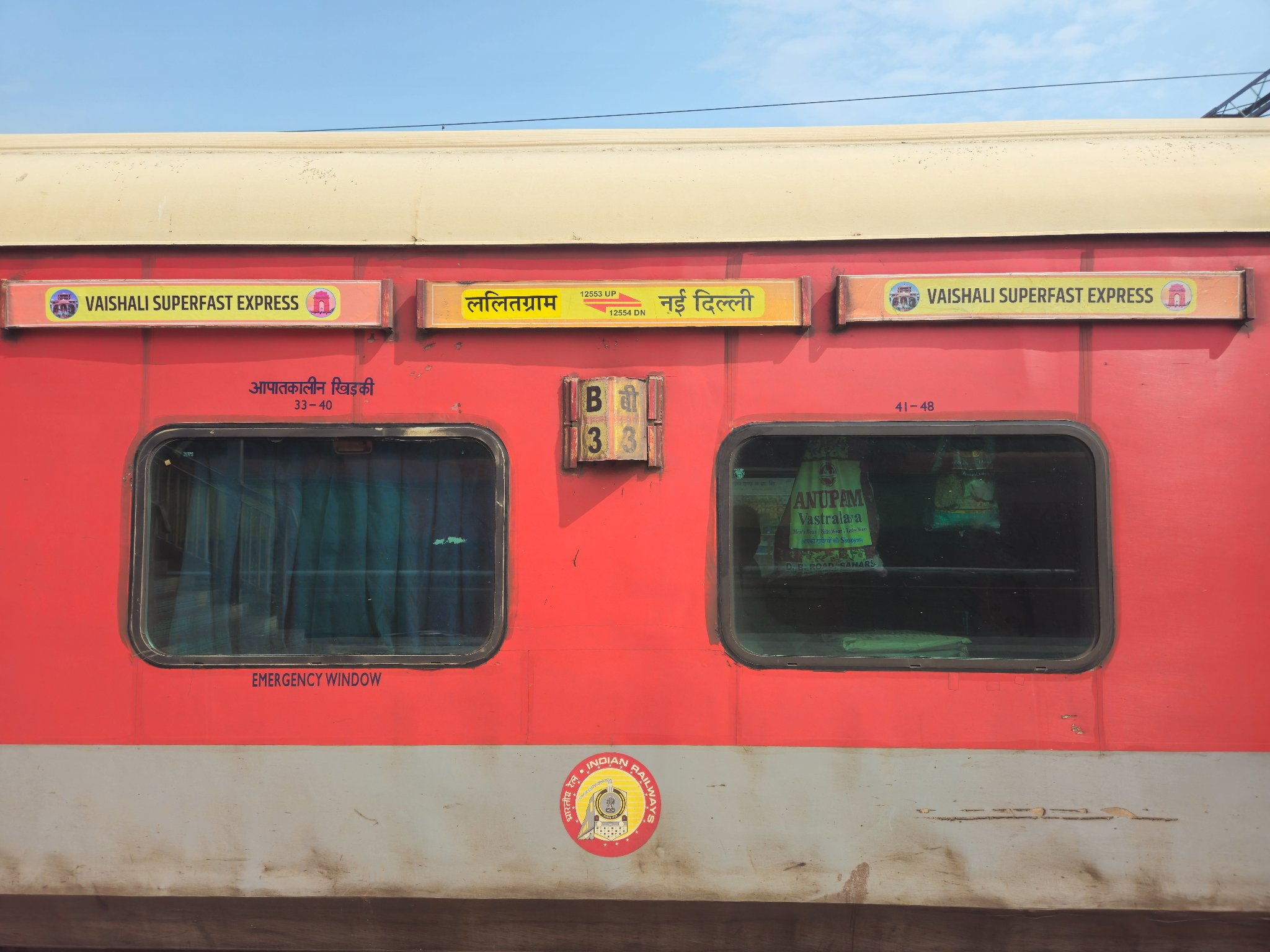
Vaishali Express At New Delhi

== History ==
- The train originally operated between New Delhi and Samastipur Junction, serving as an important route in northern Bihar.
- The train was previously known as the Jayanti Jayanta Express, also called the Muzaffarpur–New Delhi Jayanti Jayanta Express in some earlier timetables.
- It was later extended to Barauni Junction, expanding its reach within the region.
- On 5 March 2019, the service was extended again to Saharsa Junction, increasing connectivity further into northeastern Bihar.
- In May 2018, the train's older ICF coaches were replaced with modern LHB coaches, improving passenger safety and ride quality.
- The Vaishali Express became one of the first Indian trains to receive ISO 9000 certification, following the Bhopal Express.
- On 1 October 2025, the train was extended up to Lalitgram Railway Station, passing through Supaul, Sariaghat, and Raghopur, providing better rail access to these areas.
- On 7 December 2025, it is announced that Vaishali Express will change the train number from 12553/12554 to 15565/15566, thus making the train downgrade from Superfast to original Express category.

== Schedule ==
15565 / 15566 Lalitgarm–New Delhi Vaishali Express Schedule
Train Type	Mail / Express
Distance	~1300 km
Journey Time (Lalitgram → New Delhi)	~26 hrs 30 min
Journey Time (New Delhi → Lalitgram)	~25 hrs 15 min
Classes Available	AC 1-tier, AC 2-tier, AC 3-tier, Sleeper Class, General Unreserved
Operating Days	Daily
Railway Zone	East Central Railway / Northern Railway

== Route and timetable ==
Vaishali Express
15565 Lalitgarm → New Delhi				15566 New Delhi → Lalitgarm			
Station	Day	Arr.	Dep.	Station	Day	Arr.	Dep.
Lalitgram	1	—	04:00	New Delhi	1	—	20:40
Raghopur	1	04:17	04:19	Ghaziabad Junction	1	21:23	21:25
Saraigarh Junction	1	04:33	04:35	Aligarh Junction	1	22:33	22:35
Supaul junction	1	05:01	05:03	Tundla Junction	1	23:38	23:40
Saharsa Junction	1	06:25	06:45	Etawah Junction	2	00:38	00:40
Mansi Junction	1	07:38	07:40	Kanpur Central	2	02:25	02:30
Khagaria Junction	1	07:50	07:52	Aishbagh	2	04:05	04:15
Begusarai	1	08:22	08:24	Badshahnagar	2	04:37	04:40
Barauni Junction	1	08:50	09:00	Barabanki Junction	2	05:21	05:23
Dalsinghsarai	1	09:30	09:32	Gonda Junction	2	06:33	06:38
Samastipur Junction	1	09:52	09:57	Basti	2	07:40	07:43
Muzaffarpur Junction	1	10:55	11:00	Khalilabad	2	08:10	08:12
Hajipur Junction	1	11:55	12:00	Gorakhpur Junction	2	09:17	09:27
Sonpur Junction	1	12:08	12:10	Deoria Sadar	2	10:20	10:25
Chhapra Junction	1	13:40	13:45	Siwan Junction	2	11:25	11:30
Siwan Junction	1	14:35	14:40	Chhapra Junction	2	12:35	12:40
Deoria Sadar	1	15:33	15:35	Sonpur Junction	2	13:36	13:38
Gorakhpur Junction	1	16:50	17:00	Hajipur Junction	2	13:50	13:55
Khalilabad	1	17:34	17:36	Muzaffarpur Junction	2	14:43	14:48
Basti	1	17:58	18:01	Samastipur Junction	2	15:55	16:00
Gonda Junction	1	19:10	19:15	Dalsinghsarai	2	16:23	16:25
Barabanki Junction	1	20:56	20:58	Barauni Junction	2	17:10	17:20
Badshahnagar	1	21:36	21:39	Begusarai	2	17:46	17:48
Aishbagh	1	22:00	22:10	Khagaria Junction	2	18:46	18:48
Kanpur Central	1	23:40	23:45	Mansi Junction	2	19:13	19:15
Etawah Junction	2	01:14	01:16	Saharsa Junction	2	20:20	20:40
Tundla Junction	2	02:38	02:40	Supaul junction	2	21:13	21:15
Aligarh Junction	2	03:50	03:52	Saraigarh Junction	2	21:48	21:50
Ghaziabad Junction	2	05:43	05:45	Raghopur	2	22:00	22:02
New Delhi	2	06:30	—	Lalitgram	2	22:45	—

== Coach composition ==
Category	Coaches	Total
Luggage/Parcel Rake (LPR)	LPR1, LPR2	2
General Unreserved (GEN)	GEN1, GEN2, GEN3, GEN4	4
Sleeper Class (SL)	S1, S2, S3, S4, S5, S6	6
Pantry Car (PC)	PC	1
AC 3 Tier (3A)	B1, B2, B3, B4, B5	5
AC 3 Economy (3E)	M1	1
AC 2 Tier (2A)	A1, A2	2
AC First Class (1A)	H1	1
Sleeper cum Luggage Rake (SLRD) (Divyangjan)	SLRD	1
Total Coaches		22

- Primary Maintenance – Saharsa CD

== See also ==
- Radhikapur–Anand Vihar Terminal Express
- Sapt Kranti Express
