= Gaur railway station =

Railway station in Uttar Pradesh

Gaur

General information
- Location: State Highway 1A, Gadaha Dalthaman, Gaur, Basti district, Uttar Pradesh; India
- Coordinates: 26°54′48″N 82°33′40″E
- Elevation: 96 metres (315 ft)
- System: Indian Railways station
- Owner: Indian Railways
- Line: Lucknow–Gorakhpur line
- Platforms: 2
- Tracks: 2

Construction
- Structure type: Standard (on ground)
- Parking: Yes

Other information
- Status: Functioning
- Station code: GAUR
- Zone(s): North Eastern Railway zone
- Division(s): Lucknow NER
Location
- Location within India Location within Uttar Pradesh

Gaur railway station is a railway station on Lucknow–Gorakhpur line under the Lucknow NER railway division of North Eastern Railway zone. This is situated beside State Highway 1A at Gadaha Dalthaman, Gaur in Basti district in the Indian state of Uttar Pradesh.

Preceding station	Indian Railways	Following station
Tinich towards ?	North Eastern Railway zone Lucknow–Gorakhpur section	Babhnan towards ?
