= Chowka Ghat railway station =

Railway station in Uttar Pradesh

Chowka Ghat

General information
- Location: National Highway 927, Ramnagar Tehsil, Madna, Barabanki district, Uttar Pradesh; India
- Coordinates: 27°06′00″N 81°27′00″E
- Elevation: 110 metres (360 ft)
- System: Indian Railways station
- Owner: Indian Railways
- Line: Lucknow–Gorakhpur line
- Platforms: 2
- Tracks: 2

Construction
- Structure type: Standard (on ground)
- Parking: Yes

Other information
- Status: Functioning
- Station code: CKG
- Zone(s): North Eastern Railway zone
- Division(s): Lucknow NER
Location
- Location within India Location within Uttar Pradesh

Chowka Ghat railway station is a railway station on Lucknow–Gorakhpur line under the Lucknow NER railway division of North Eastern Railway zone. This is situated beside National Highway 927 at Ramnagar Tehsil, Madna in Barabanki district in the Indian state of Uttar Pradesh.

Preceding station	Indian Railways	Following station
Ghaghara Ghat towards ?	North Eastern Railway zone Lucknow–Gorakhpur section	Burhwal Junction towards ?
