= Sihapar Halt railway station =

Railway station in Uttar Pradesh

Sihapar Halt

General information
- Location: National Highway 28, Kashroul, Sahjanwa, Gorakhpur district, Uttar Pradesh; India
- Coordinates: 26°45′28″N 83°09′54″E
- Elevation: 80 metres (260 ft)
- System: Indian Railways station
- Owner: Indian Railways
- Line: Lucknow–Gorakhpur line
- Platforms: 1
- Tracks: 2

Construction
- Structure type: Standard (on ground)
- Parking: Yes

Other information
- Status: Functioning
- Station code: SIPR
- Zone(s): North Eastern Railway zone
- Division(s): Lucknow NER
Location
- Location within India Location within Uttar Pradesh

Sihapar Halt railway station is a railway station on Lucknow–Gorakhpur line under the Lucknow NER railway division of North Eastern Railway zone. This is situated beside National Highway 28 at Kashroul, Sahjanwa in Gorakhpur district in the Indian state of Uttar Pradesh.

Preceding station	Indian Railways	Following station
Sahjanwa towards ?	North Eastern Railway zone Lucknow–Gorakhpur section	Maghar towards ?
