= Jagatbela railway station =

Railway station in Uttar Pradesh

Jagatbela

General information
- Location: Gorakhpur-Jagatbela Road, Jagatbela, Gorakhpur district, Uttar Pradesh; India
- Coordinates: 26°46′20″N 83°16′43″E
- Elevation: 78 metres (256 ft)
- System: Indian Railways station
- Owner: Indian Railways
- Line: Lucknow–Gorakhpur line
- Platforms: 2
- Tracks: 2

Construction
- Structure type: Standard (on ground)
- Parking: Yes

Other information
- Status: Functioning
- Station code: JTB
- Zone(s): North Eastern Railway zone
- Division(s): Lucknow NER
Location
- Location within India Location within Uttar Pradesh

Jagatbela railway station is a railway station on Lucknow–Gorakhpur line under the Lucknow NER railway division of North Eastern Railway zone. This is situated beside Gorakhpur-Jagatbela Road at Jagatbela in Gorakhpur district in the Indian state of Uttar Pradesh.

Preceding station	Indian Railways	Following station
Domingarh towards ?	North Eastern Railway zone Lucknow–Gorakhpur section	Sahjanwa towards ?
