= Sarju railway station =

Railway station in Uttar Pradesh

Sarju

General information
- Location: Kuri, Sarju, Gonda district, Uttar Pradesh; India
- Coordinates: 27°06′43″N 81°38′53″E
- Elevation: 109 metres (358 ft)
- System: Indian Railways station
- Owner: Indian Railways
- Line: Lucknow–Gorakhpur line
- Platforms: 2
- Tracks: 2

Construction
- Structure type: Standard (on ground)
- Parking: Yes

Other information
- Status: Functioning
- Station code: SUJ
- Zone(s): North Eastern Railway zone
- Division(s): Lucknow NER
Location
- Location within India Location within Uttar Pradesh

Sarju railway station is a railway station on Lucknow–Gorakhpur line under the Lucknow NER railway division of North Eastern Railway zone. This is situated at Kuri, Sarju in Gonda district in the Indian state of Uttar Pradesh.

Preceding station	Indian Railways	Following station
Colonelganj towards ?	North Eastern Railway zone Lucknow–Gorakhpur section	Jarwal Road towards ?
