= Motiganj railway station =

Railway station in Uttar Pradesh

General information
- Location: State Highway 30, Motiganj, Gonda district, Uttar Pradesh; India
- Coordinates: 27°06′05″N 82°06′13″E
- Elevation: 110 metres (360 ft)
- System: Indian Railways station
- Owner: Indian Railways
- Line: Lucknow–Gorakhpur line
- Platforms: 2
- Tracks: 2

Construction
- Structure type: Standard (on ground)
- Parking: Yes

Other information
- Status: Functioning
- Station code: MOTG
- Zone(s): North Eastern Railway zone
- Division(s): Lucknow NER
Location
- Location within India Location within Uttar Pradesh

Motiganj railway station is a railway station on Lucknow–Gorakhpur line under the Lucknow NER railway division of North Eastern Railway zone. This is situated beside State Highway 30 at Motiganj in Gonda district in the Indian state of Uttar Pradesh.

Preceding station	Indian Railways	Following station
Jhilahi towards ?	North Eastern Railway zone Lucknow–Gorakhpur section	Baruachak towards ?
