= Gonda Kachahri railway station =

Railway station in Uttar Pradesh

Gonda Kachahri

General information
- Location: Civil lines, Gonda, Gonda district, Uttar Pradesh; India
- Coordinates: 27°08′25″N 81°56′02″E
- Elevation: 111 metres (364 ft)
- System: Indian Railways station
- Owner: Indian Railways
- Line: Lucknow–Gorakhpur line
- Platforms: 3
- Tracks: 2

Construction
- Structure type: Standard (on ground)
- Parking: Yes

Other information
- Status: Functioning
- Station code: GDK
- Zone(s): North Eastern Railway zone
- Division(s): Lucknow NER
Location
- Location within India Location within Uttar Pradesh

Gonda Kachahri railway station is a railway station on the Lucknow–Gorakhpur line under the Lucknow NER railway division of North Eastern Railway zone. This is situated at Civil lines, Gonda in Gonda district in the Indian state of Uttar Pradesh.

Preceding station	Indian Railways	Following station
Gonda Junction towards ?	North Eastern Railway zone Lucknow–Gorakhpur section	Kathola towards ?
