= Maijapur railway station =

Railway station in Uttar Pradesh

Maijapur

General information
- Location: Balpur, Chauri, Gonda district, Uttar Pradesh; India
- Coordinates: 27°08′30″N 81°46′26″E
- Elevation: 110 metres (360 ft)
- System: Indian Railways station
- Owner: Indian Railways
- Line: Lucknow–Gorakhpur line
- Platforms: 2
- Tracks: 2

Construction
- Structure type: Standard (on ground)
- Parking: Yes

Other information
- Status: Functioning
- Station code: MIR
- Zone(s): North Eastern Railway zone
- Division(s): Lucknow NER
Location
- Location within India Location within Uttar Pradesh

Maijapur railway station is a railway station on Lucknow–Gorakhpur line under the Lucknow NER railway division of North Eastern Railway zone. This is situated at Balpur, Chauri in Gonda district in the Indian state of Uttar Pradesh.

Preceding station	Indian Railways	Following station
Kathola towards ?	North Eastern Railway zone Lucknow–Gorakhpur section	Kasturi towards ?
