= Baruachak railway station =

Railway station in Uttar Pradesh

General information
- Location: State Highway 30, Gonda Road, Gonda district, Uttar Pradesh; India
- Coordinates: 27°07′22″N 82°03′19″E
- Elevation: 108 metres (354 ft)
- System: Indian Railways station
- Owner: Indian Railways
- Line: Lucknow–Gorakhpur line
- Platforms: 2
- Tracks: 2

Construction
- Structure type: Standard (on ground)
- Parking: Yes

Other information
- Status: Functioning
- Station code: BRCK
- Zone(s): North Eastern Railway zone
- Division(s): Lucknow NER
Location
- Location within India Location within Uttar Pradesh

Baruachak railway station is a railway station on Lucknow–Gorakhpur line under the Lucknow NER railway division of North Eastern Railway zone. This is situated beside State Highway 30, Gonda Road at Baruachak in Gonda district in the Indian state of Uttar Pradesh.

Preceding station	Indian Railways	Following station
Motiganj towards ?	North Eastern Railway zone Lucknow–Gorakhpur section	Gonda Junction towards ?
