= Orwara railway station =

Railway station in Uttar Pradesh

Orwara

General information
- Location: National Highway 28, Wankashi, Orwara, Basti district, Uttar Pradesh; India
- Coordinates: 26°47′56″N 82°50′33″E
- Elevation: 91 metres (299 ft)
- System: Indian Railways station
- Owner: Indian Railways
- Line: Lucknow–Gorakhpur line
- Platforms: 2
- Tracks: 2

Construction
- Structure type: Standard (on ground)
- Parking: Yes

Other information
- Status: Functioning
- Station code: ORW
- Zone(s): North Eastern Railway zone
- Division(s): Lucknow NER
Location
- Location within India Location within Uttar Pradesh

Orwara railway station is a railway station on Lucknow–Gorakhpur line under the Lucknow NER railway division of North Eastern Railway zone. This is situated beside National Highway 28 at Wankashi, Orwara in Basti district in the Indian state of Uttar Pradesh.

Preceding station	Indian Railways	Following station
Munderwa towards ?	North Eastern Railway zone Lucknow–Gorakhpur section	Basti towards ?
