= Chureb railway station =

Railway station in Uttar Pradesh, India

Chureb

General information
- Location: National Highway 28, Kheendiha, Chureb, Sant Kabir Nagar district, Uttar Pradesh; India
- Coordinates: 26°46′56″N 82°58′39″E
- Elevation: 88 metres (289 ft)
- System: Indian Railways station
- Owner: Indian Railways
- Line: Lucknow–Gorakhpur line
- Platforms: 3
- Tracks: 2

Construction
- Structure type: Standard (on ground)
- Parking: Yes

Other information
- Status: Functioning
- Station code: CRV
- Zone(s): North Eastern Railway zone
- Division(s): Lucknow NER
Location
- Location within India Location within Uttar Pradesh

Chureb railway station is a railway station on Lucknow–Gorakhpur line under the Lucknow NER railway division of North Eastern Railway zone. This is situated beside National Highway 28 at Kheendiha, Chureb in Sant Kabir Nagar district in the Indian state of Uttar Pradesh.

Preceding station	Indian Railways	Following station
Khalilabad towards ?	North Eastern Railway zone Lucknow–Gorakhpur section	Munderwa towards ?
