= Ghaghara Ghat railway station =

Railway station in Uttar Pradesh

Ghaghara Ghat

General information
- Location: National Highway 927, Tappe Sipah, Bahraich district, Uttar Pradesh; India
- Coordinates: 27°06′10″N 81°30′12″E
- Elevation: 109 metres (358 ft)
- System: Indian Railways station
- Owner: Indian Railways
- Line: Lucknow–Gorakhpur line
- Platforms: 2
- Tracks: 2

Construction
- Structure type: Standard (on ground)
- Parking: Yes

Other information
- Status: Functioning
- Station code: GHT
- Zone(s): North Eastern Railway zone
- Division(s): Lucknow NER
Location
- Location within India Location within Uttar Pradesh

Ghaghara Ghat railway station is a railway station on Lucknow–Gorakhpur line under the Lucknow NER railway division of North Eastern Railway zone. This is situated beside National Highway 927 at Tappe Sipah in Bahraich district in the Indian state of Uttar Pradesh.

| Preceding station | Indian Railways | Following station |
|---|---|---|
| Jarwal Road towards ? | North Eastern Railway zone Lucknow–Gorakhpur section | Chowka Ghat towards ? |
