= Kasturi railway station =

Railway station in Uttar Pradesh

Kasturi

General information
- Location: Gourava Khurd, Kasturi, Gonda district, Uttar Pradesh; India
- Coordinates: 27°08′24″N 81°43′44″E
- Elevation: 108 metres (354 ft)
- System: Indian Railways station
- Owner: Indian Railways
- Line: Lucknow–Gorakhpur line
- Platforms: 2
- Tracks: 2

Construction
- Structure type: Standard (on ground)
- Parking: Yes

Other information
- Status: Functioning
- Station code: KSR
- Zone(s): North Eastern Railway zone
- Division(s): Lucknow NER
Location
- Location within India Location within Uttar Pradesh

Kasturi railway station is a railway station on Lucknow–Gorakhpur line under the Lucknow NER railway division of North Eastern Railway zone. It is situated at Gourava Khurd, Kasturi in Gonda district in the Indian state of Uttar Pradesh.

Preceding station	Indian Railways	Following station
Maijapur towards ?	North Eastern Railway zone Lucknow–Gorakhpur section	Colonelganj towards ?
