= Colonelganj railway station =

Railway station in Uttar Pradesh

Colonelganj

General information
- Location: Sakrora, Colonelganj, Gonda district, Uttar Pradesh; India
- Coordinates: 27°08′16″N 81°41′39″E
- Elevation: 108 metres (354 ft)
- System: Indian Railways station
- Owner: Indian Railways
- Line: Lucknow–Gorakhpur line
- Platforms: 2
- Tracks: 2

Construction
- Structure type: Standard (on ground)
- Parking: Yes

Other information
- Status: Functioning
- Station code: CLJ
- Zone(s): North Eastern Railway zone
- Division(s): Lucknow NER
Location
- Location within India Location within Uttar Pradesh

Colonelganj railway station is a railway station on Lucknow–Gorakhpur line under the Lucknow NER railway division of North Eastern Railway zone. This is situated at Sakrora, Colonelganj in Gonda district in the Indian state of Uttar Pradesh.

Preceding station	Indian Railways	Following station
Kasturi towards ?	North Eastern Railway zone Lucknow–Gorakhpur section	Sarju towards ?
