= Tinich railway station =

Railway station in Uttar Pradesh

Tinich

General information
- Location: State Highway 1A, Kaithaulia, Sari Kalp, Basti district, Uttar Pradesh; India
- Coordinates: 26°52′56″N 82°38′23″E
- Elevation: 94 metres (308 ft)
- System: Indian Railways station
- Owner: Indian Railways
- Line: Lucknow–Gorakhpur line
- Platforms: 2
- Tracks: 2

Construction
- Structure type: Standard (on ground)
- Parking: Yes

Other information
- Status: Functioning
- Station code: TH
- Zone(s): North Eastern Railway zone
- Division(s): Lucknow NER
Location
- Location within India Location within Uttar Pradesh

Tinich railway station is a railway station on Lucknow–Gorakhpur line under the Lucknow NER railway division of North Eastern Railway zone. This is situated beside State Highway 1A at Kaithaulia, Sari Kalp in Basti district in the Indian state of Uttar Pradesh.

Preceding station	Indian Railways	Following station
Govind Nagar towards ?	North Eastern Railway zone Lucknow–Gorakhpur section	Gaur towards ?
