= Amarnath Express =

Train in India

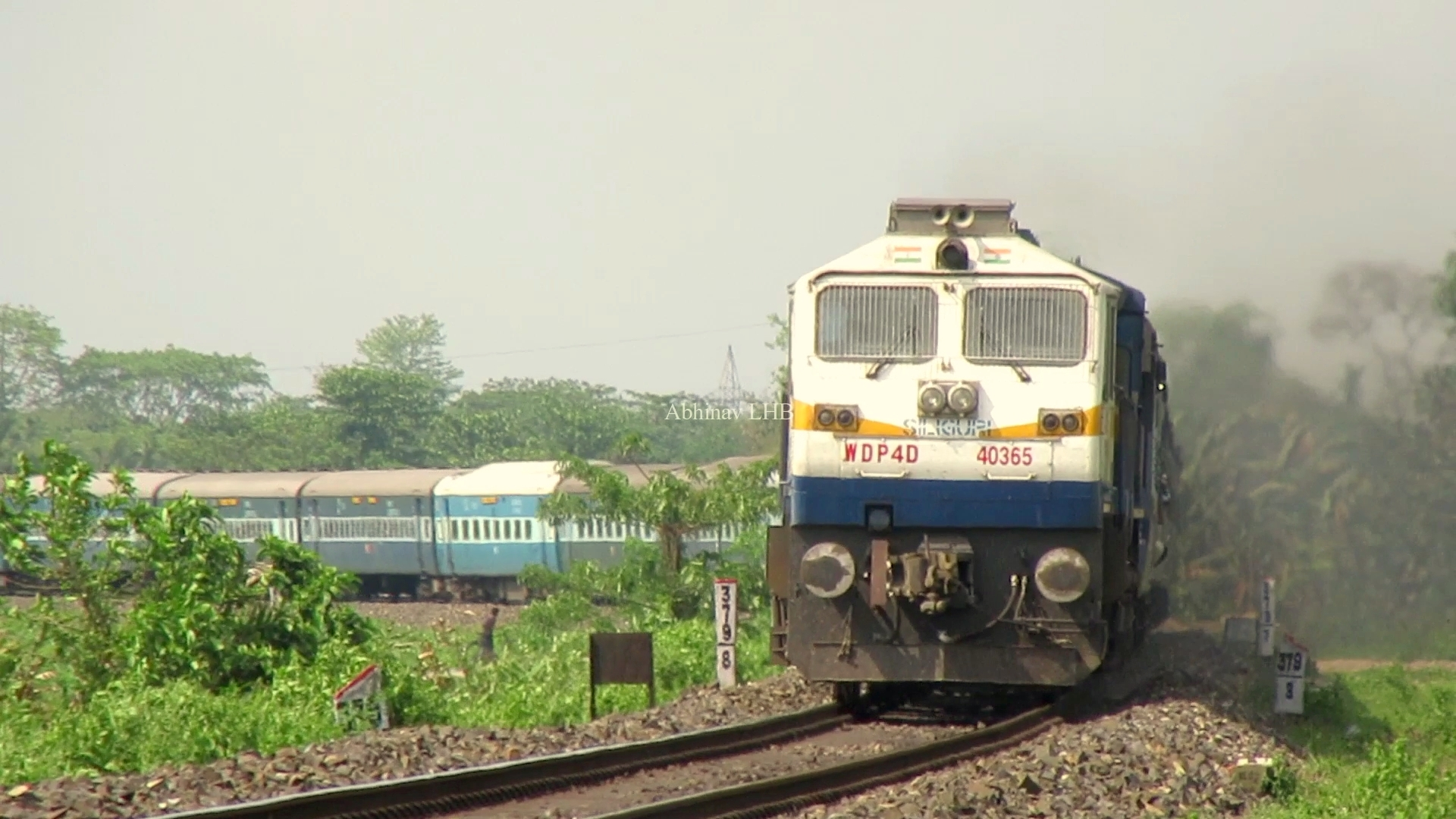
- A WDP-4D #40365 of Siliguri Loco Shed hauling Amarnath Express.

Overview
- Service type: Express
- First service: 13 March 2002; 24 years ago
- Current operator: Northeast Frontier Railway

Route
- Termini: Guwahati (GHY); Jammu Tawi (JAT)
- Stops: 41
- Distance travelled: 2,431 km (1,511 mi)
- Average journey time: 47 hours 15 mins
- Service frequency: Weekly.
- Train number: 15653 / 15654

On-board services
- Classes: AC 2 tier, AC 3 tier, Sleeper Class, General Unreserved
- Seating arrangements: Yes
- Sleeping arrangements: Yes
- Catering facilities: Available
- Observation facilities: Large windows
- Baggage facilities: Available
- Other facilities: Below the seats

Technical
- Rolling stock: LHB coach
- Track gauge: 1,676 mm (5 ft 6 in)
- Operating speed: 130 km/h (81 mph) maximum, 51 km/h (32 mph) average including halts.

The 15653 / 15654 Amarnath Express is an Express train belonging to Indian Railways - Northeast Frontier Railway zone that runs between Guwahati and Jammu Tawi in India.

It operates as train number 15653 from Guwahati to Jammu Tawi and as train number 15654 in the reverse direction serving the 8 states of Assam, West Bengal, Bihar, Uttar Pradesh, Uttarakhand, Haryana, Punjab and Jammu and Kashmir.

It is named after the Amarnath Temple which is located in the union territory of Jammu and Kashmir and is 1 of 3 trains that connect Guwahati and Jammu Tawi, the other being the Lohit Express and Kamakhya–Shri Mata Vaishno Devi Katra Express.

== Coaches ==
The 15653 / 54 Guwahati Jammu Tawi Amarnath Express has 1 AC 2 tier, 2 AC 3 tier, 14 Sleeper Class, 4 General Unreserved and 2 SLR (Seating cum Luggage Rake) Coaches. In addition, it carries a Pantry car coach.

As is customary with most train services in India, Coach Composition may be amended at the discretion of Indian Railways depending on demand.

== Service ==
The 15653 Guwahati Jammu Tawi Amarnath Express covers the distance of 2,431 km (1,511 mi) in 47 hours 15 mins (51.45 km/h) and in 48 hours 45 mins as 15654 Jammu Tawi Guwahati Amarnath Express (49.87 km/h).

== Routeing ==
The 15653 / 54 Guwahati Jammu Tawi Amarnath Express runs from:

ASSAM

1. Guwahati (Starts)
2. Kamakhya
3. Rangiya
4. New Bongaigaon Junction

WEST BENGAL

1. New Alipurduar
2. New Cooch Behar
3. Dhupguri
4. New Jalpaiguri (Siliguri)

BIHAR

1. Katihar Junction
2. Begusarai
3. Barauni Junction
4. Muzaffarpur Junction
5. Bapudam Motihari

UTTAR PRADESH

1. Gorakhpur Junction
2. Basti
3. Babhnan
4. Gonda
5. Lucknow NR
6. Shahjehanpur
7. Bareilly
8. Moradabad
9. Saharanpur Junction

UTTARAKHAND

1. Laksar Junction

HARYANA

1. Jagadhri
2. Ambala Cantonment Junction

PUNJAB

1. Ludhiana Junction
2. Jalandhar Cantonment
3. Pathankot Cantonment

JAMMU KASHMIR

1. Kathua
2. Jammu Tawi (Ends).

== Traction ==
It is hauled by a Tughlakabad Loco Shed or Ghaziabad Loco Shed based WAP-7 electric locomotive from Guwahati to Jammu Tawi and vice versa.

== Operation ==
15653 Guwahati Jammu Tawi Amarnath Express runs from Guwahati every Wednesday reaching Jammu Tawi on the 3rd day.

15654 Jammu Tawi Guwahati Amarnath Express runs from Jammu Tawi every Friday reaching Guwahati on the 3rd day.
