= Manwar Sangam Express =

Train in India

Overview
- Service type: Express
- First service: 30 November 2016; 9 years ago
- Current operator: North Central Railway

Route
- Termini: Prayagraj Sangam (PYGS); Basti (BST)
- Stops: 8
- Distance travelled: 267 km (166 mi)
- Average journey time: 6 hrs 40 mins
- Service frequency: 5 days a week. (Note: Runs five days in a week for every direction.)
- Train number: 14231 / 14232

On-board services
- Classes: AC Chair Car, Chair Car, General Unreserved
- Seating arrangements: Yes
- Sleeping arrangements: No
- Auto-rack arrangements: Overhead racks
- Catering facilities: On-board catering, E-catering
- Observation facilities: Large windows
- Baggage facilities: Available
- Other facilities: Below the seats

Technical
- Rolling stock: ICF coach
- Track gauge: Broad Gauge 1,676 mm (5 ft 6 in)
- Operating speed: 44 km/h (27 mph) average including halts.
- Rake maintenance: Prayagraj Sangam

The 14231 / 14232 Manwar Sangam Express is an express train belonging to North Central Railway zone that runs between Prayagraj Sangam and Basti in India. It is currently being operated with 14231/14232 train numbers on five days in a week for every direction.

== Service ==
The 14231/Manwar Sangam Express has an average speed of 44 km/h and covers 267 km in 6h 40m. The 14232/Manwar Sangam Express has an average speed of 44 km/h and covers 267 km in 6h 40m.

== Route and halts ==
The important halts of the train are:

- Prayagraj Sangam
- Pratapgarh Junction
- Sultanpur Junction
- Faizabad Junction
- Ayodhya Junction
- Mankapur Junction
- Babhnan
- Basti

== Coach composition ==
The train has standard ICF rakes with max speed of 110 kmph. The train consists of 12 coaches :

- 2 AC Third
- 12 Sleeper
- 4 General
- 2 Seating cum Luggage Rake

== Traction ==
earlier was WDP-4D. Both trains are hauled by a Ghaziabad Loco Shed-based WAP-5 or Tughlakabad Loco Shed-based WAP-4 electric locomotive from Prayagraj Sangam to Basti and vice versa.

== See also ==
- Prayagraj Junction railway station
- Basti railway station
