= Raghopur railway station =

Railway station in Bihar

Raghopur
- Indian Railways logo

General information
- Location: NH 131 Road, Raghopur, Supaul district, Bihar; India
- Coordinates: 26.30004°N 86.8388854°E
- Elevation: 66 metres (217 ft)
- System: Indian Railways station
- Owner: Indian Railways
- Operator: East Central Railway
- Line: Saharsa–Forbesganj line
- Platforms: 3
- Tracks: 2

Construction
- Structure type: Standard (on ground station)
- Parking: Available
- Accessible: Yes

Other information
- Status: Functioning
- Station code: RGV
- Zone(s): East Central Railway
- Division(s): Samastipur

History
- Opened: 1 October 1888; 138 years ago
- Closed: 1934; 92 years ago
- Rebuilt: 5 June 1974; 52 years ago

Services
Preceding station	Indian Railways	Following station
Narayanpur Murli Halt towards Saraigarh Junction	East Central Railway zone Saharsa–Forbesganj line	Ram Bishanpur towards Forbesganj Junction
Location
- Location within India Location within Bihar
- Interactive map

Raghopur railway station (station code: RGV), is a railway station on the Saharsa–Forbesganj line under Samastipur railway division of the East Central Railway zone. The station is situated near NH 131 Road at Raghopur in Supaul district in the Indian state of Bihar.

== History ==
This railway station is part of the historic Saharsa–Forbesganj line operated by then Tirhut Railway, and officially opened on October 1, 1888, during the railway line extension up to Pratapganj. At the time, the railway line was meter-gauge from Saharsa to Forbesganj. The devastating 1934 Bihar earthquake severely impacted the rail tracks and buildings, destroying much of the railway infrastructure.

Following India's independence, the 23 kilometres (14 mi) long Saraigarh–Raghopur-Lalitgram-Pratpganj railway line was inaugurated by then Railways minister, Lalit Narayan Mishra on 5 June 1974.

In 2008, the Bihar flood caused by the Kosi river damaged the Raghopur-Forbesganj railway section. Following the damage, only the Saharsa–Raghopur meter gauge rail section remained operational up to 2015. On September 19, 2020 the broad gauge railway section was resumed between Saharsa and Raghopur.

After 13 long years, the railway section of 20 kilometres (12 mi), was upgraded to broad gauge from Raghopur to Lalitgram, and railway service was started on April 1, 2022.The 29 kilometres (18 mi) railway line was finally restored from Lalitgram to Forbesganj, and passenger train service was resumed on March 12, 2024. The entire Saharsa–Forbesganj line was successfully converted to broad gauge, significantly improving connectivity in the region.
