= Munderwa railway station =

Railway station in Uttar Pradesh

Munderwa

General information
- Location: Jagdishpur, Munderwa Lohadar, Basti district, Uttar Pradesh; India
- Coordinates: 26°46′35″N 82°54′12″E
- Elevation: 89 metres (292 ft)
- System: Indian Railways station
- Owner: Indian Railways
- Line: Lucknow–Gorakhpur line
- Platforms: 2
- Tracks: 2

Construction
- Structure type: Standard (on ground)
- Parking: Yes

Other information
- Status: Functioning
- Station code: MND
- Zone(s): North Eastern Railway zone
- Division(s): Lucknow NER
Location
- Location within India Location within Uttar Pradesh

Munderwa railway station is a railway station on Lucknow–Gorakhpur line under the Lucknow NER railway division of North Eastern Railway zone. This is situated at Jagdishpur, Munderwa Lohadar in Basti district in the Indian state of Uttar Pradesh.

| Preceding station | Indian Railways | Following station |
|---|---|---|
| Chureb towards ? | North Eastern Railway zone Lucknow–Gorakhpur section | Orwara towards ? |
