= Govind Nagar railway station =

Railway station in Uttar Pradesh

Coordinates: 26.8529°N 82.7218°E

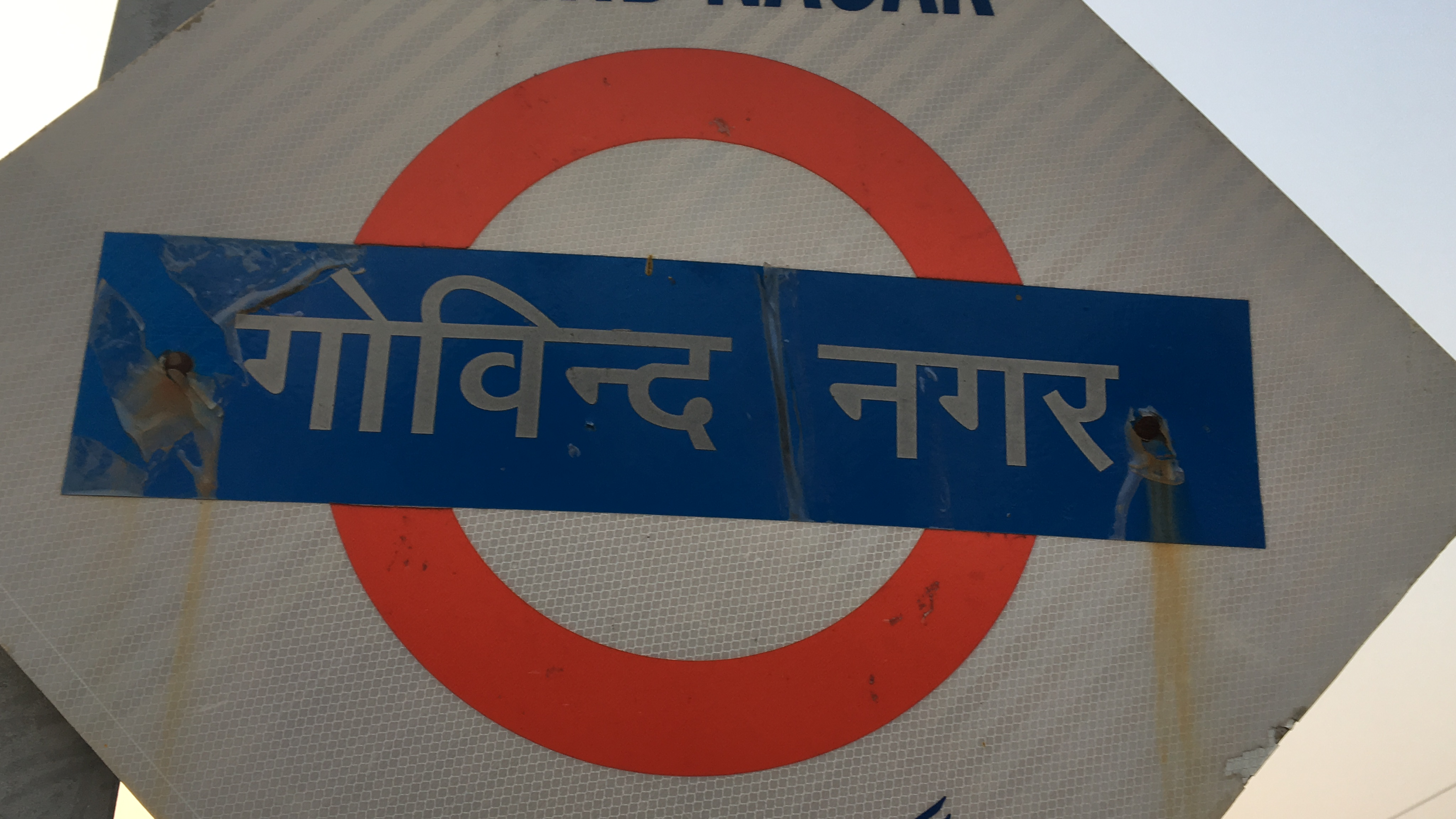

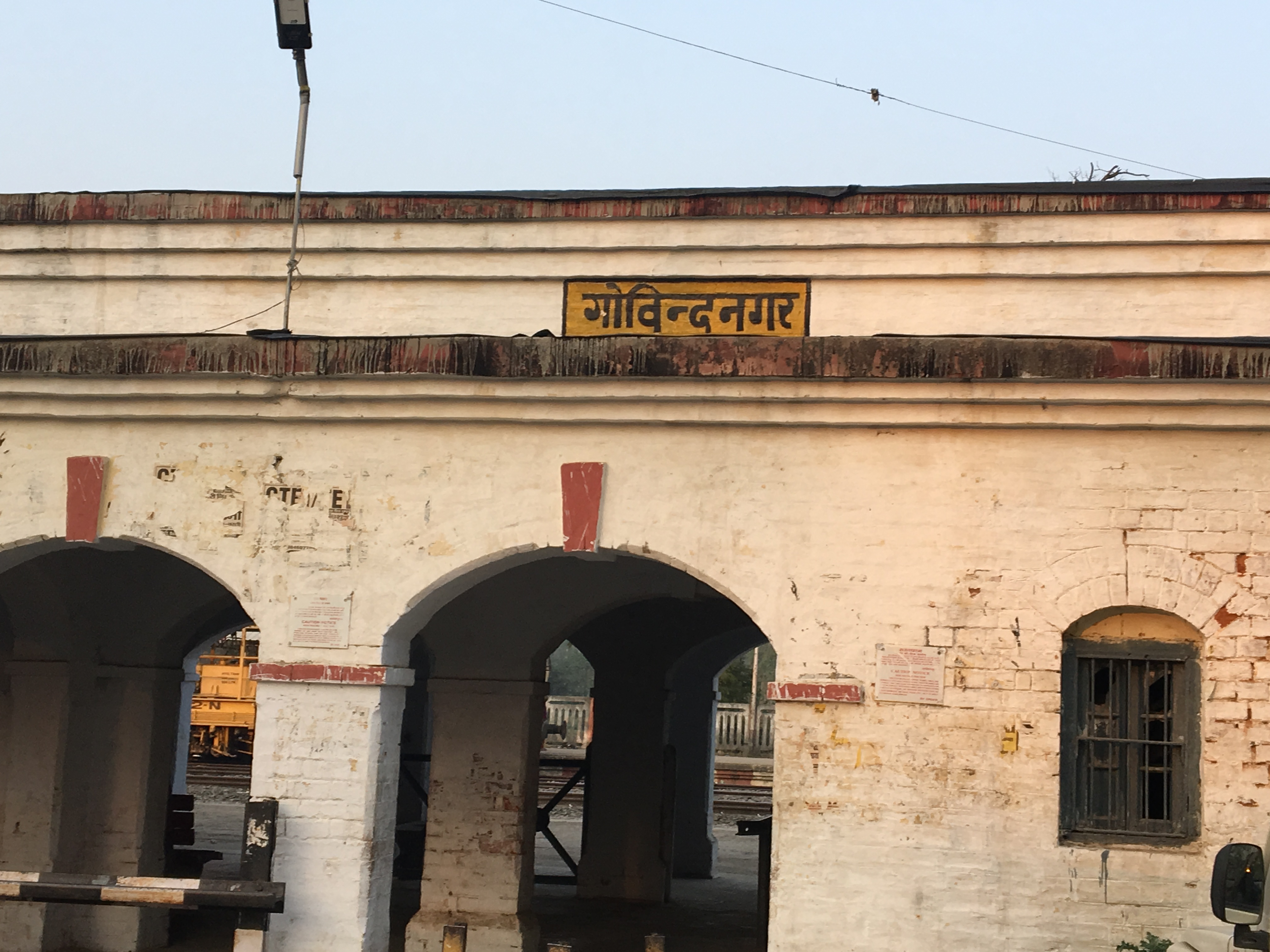
Govind Nagar RAILWAY Station

Govind Nagar railway station is located in Basti district in the Indian state of Uttar Pradesh. It serves Walterganj Market, Sugar Mill, and the surrounding Village areas. Station Code (GOVR) Northern Railway. Here are some trains that are passing through Govindnagar railway stations like Gkp-gd Passenger, Gd-gkp Passenger, Ay-gkp Passenger, Gkp-ay Passenger, Gd-gkp Passenger, and many more.

Preceding station	Indian Railways	Following station
Basti towards ?	North Eastern Railway zone Lucknow–Gorakhpur section	Tinich towards ?
