= Jarwal Road railway station =

Railway station in Uttar Pradesh

Jarwal Road

General information
- Location: State Highway 13, Kaiserganj Tehsil, Bambhaura, Bahraich district, Uttar Pradesh; India
- Coordinates: 27°07′13″N 81°32′25″E
- Elevation: 112 metres (367 ft)
- System: Indian Railways station
- Owner: Indian Railways
- Line: Lucknow–Gorakhpur line
- Platforms: 2
- Tracks: 2

Construction
- Structure type: Standard (on ground)
- Parking: Yes

Other information
- Status: Functioning
- Station code: JLD
- Zone(s): North Eastern Railway zone
- Division(s): Lucknow NER
Location
- Location within India Location within Uttar Pradesh

Jarwal Road railway station is a railway station on Lucknow–Gorakhpur line under the Lucknow NER railway division of North Eastern Railway zone. This is situated beside State Highway 13, at Kaiserganj Tehsil, Bambhaura in Bahraich district in the Indian state of Uttar Pradesh.

Preceding station	Indian Railways	Following station
Sarju towards ?	North Eastern Railway zone Lucknow–Gorakhpur section	Ghaghara Ghat towards ?
