= 2014 Khalilabad derailment =

Rail accident in India

Coordinates: 26°46′57″N 82°58′41″E

Details
- Date: 26 May 2014
- Location: Sant Kabir Nagar district, Uttar Pradesh
- Country: India

Statistics
- Trains: 2
- Deaths: 40
- Injured: 150
- Damage: 2 trains

On 26 May 2014, an express train travelling from Gorakhpur town to Hisar collided with a stationary goods train at Chureb railway station in Khalilabad north India, killing at least 40 people and injuring another 150. Prime-minister-elect Narendra Modi expressed his condolences at the time, on Twitter.

Narendra Modi
(@narendramodi)
tweeted:

My condolences to families of those who lost their lives in the Gorakhdham express tragedy. Prayers with the injured.

26 May 2014
