= Saharsa–Forbesganj line =

Railway line in India

Overview
- Status: Operational
- Owner: Indian Railways
- Locale: Bihar, India
- Termini: Saharsa Junction; Forbesganj Junction
- Stations: 23

Service
- Type: Single electric line
- Operator: East Central Railway zone

History
- Opened: 1887; 139 years ago

Technical
- Line length: 111 km (69 mi)
- Number of tracks: 1
- Track gauge: 1,676 mm (5 ft 6 in)
- Electrification: Yes
- Operating speed: SHC-SOU 100 km/h (62 mph); SOU-SRGR 70 km/h (43 mph); SRGR-RGV 90 km/h (56 mph); RGV-FBG 100 km/h (62 mph)

Saharsa–Forbesganj line is a single 5 ft 6 in (1,676 mm) broad-gauge track from Saharsa Junction to Forbesganj Junction of Bihar state. The line connects Saharsa, headquarter of Kosi Division, to Forbesganj, a major trade centre in Araria District. It is oldest and longest rail route in Kosi region. The whole line falls under Samastipur Division of East Central Railway.

== History ==
The history of the Saharsa–Forbesganj railway line is deeply intertwined with the shifting course of the Kosi River. The first meter-gauge (MG) railway line in the region was introduced by the Tirhut Railway with the construction of the Nirmali–Bhaptiahi (now Saraigarh Junction) section on 15 November 1887. It was later extended to Pertabganj (now Pratapganj) in 1888 and further to Kunwaghat (then situated on the bank of the Kosi River) in 1890.

In 1907, the network expanded with the addition of a new Bhaptiahi–Simri Bakhtiyarpur line via Supaul and Saharsa, improving connectivity in the region. However, the Kosi River's unpredictable shifts led to the construction of a diversion between Raghopur and Pertabganj (now Pratapganj) in 1912 to maintain the railway link.

The devastating 1934 Bihar earthquake severely impacted the region, destroying much of the railway infrastructure. The Kosi River shifted west of Bhaptiahi (Saraigarh), severing the railway connection to Darbhanga. Despite the widespread damage, the Saharsa–Bhaptiahi section was restored and became operational in 1950, providing a lifeline to the region.

Following India's independence, the Saraigarh–Forbesganj section was commissioned in 1975, making the entire line functional in meter gauge.

== Gauge Conversion ==
The gauge conversion project for the Saharsa–Forbesganj railway line, which involved upgrading the line from meter gauge (MG) to broad gauge (BG), was sanctioned in 2003–04. However, in 2008, the devastating Kosi floods destroyed the MG section between Raghopur and Forbesganj. Following this, only the Saharsa–Raghopur section remained operational. Although the project was approved in 2003–04, the actual gauge conversion work began in January 2012. During the process, the Tharbitia–Raghopur MG section was closed in 2015, while the Saharsa–Tharbitia MG section continued to operate until 2016, making it the last surviving MG line in the Kosi division.

The BG-converted line was opened in multiple phases:

1. Saharsa Junction–Garh Baruari – 2019
2. Garh Baruari–Supaul – March 2020
3. Supaul–Raghopur (including Kosi Mahasetu) – August 2020
4. Raghopur–Lalitgram – 2022
5. Lalitgram–Forbesganj – 2024

Thus, the entire Saharsa–Forbesganj line was successfully converted to broad gauge, significantly improving connectivity in the region.

== Trains ==
- Jogbani-Danapur Intercity Express
- Jogbani-Saharsa Express
- Jogbani-Raxaul Weekly Express
- Lalitgram–Saharsa Rajyarani Special
- Lalitgram–Saharsa Jansadharan Special
- Saharsa–Anand Vihar Garib Rath Special

== See also ==
- Indian Railways
- Saharsa Junction
- Samastipur railway division
- Kosi Division
- East Central Railway zone
