= JLD =

JLD may refer to:

- Justice League Dark, a superhero team appearing in American comic books published by DC Comics
- Julia Louis-Dreyfus (born 1961), an American actress and comedian
- Jarwal Road railway station, the station code JLD
- Jurong Lake District, a district of Singapore
- Janata Lok Dal, a fictitious political party
