= Shisho Halt railway station =

Railway station in Bihar, India

Shisho Halt

General information
- Location: Darbhanga - Kamtaul Hwy, Shisho, Bihar; India
- Coordinates: 26.196505°N 85.877953°E
- Elevation: 66 metres (217 ft)
- System: Indian Railways station
- Owner: Indian Railways
- Operator: East Central
- Line: Muzaffarpur–Gorakhpur main line
- Platforms: 3

Construction
- Structure type: At-grade
- Parking: Yes
- Accessible: Available

Other information
- Status: Functioning
- Station code: SHEO
- Zone(s): East Central Railway zone
- Division(s): Samastipur

History
- Opened: 1930

Passengers
- Daily: 100+
Location
- Location within Bihar Location within India
- Interactive map

Shisho Halt railway station (Station code: SHEO) is a small halt station in Bihar, India. It is operated by Indian Railways and falls under the East Central Railway zone.

== Major trains ==
● Saharsa–Chheharta (Amritsar) Amrit Bharat Express (14627/14628)
