= Sitapur Cutchery railway station =

Railway Station in Uttar Pradesh, India

- Indian Railways logo

General information
- Location: Sitapur, Uttar Pradesh; India
- Coordinates: 27.5645°N 80.6871°E
- Elevation: 141 metres (463 ft)
- System: Indian Railways station
- Owner: Indian Railways
- Operator: North Eastern Railway
- Platforms: 1
- Tracks: 2
- Connections: Auto stand

Construction
- Structure type: At grade
- Parking: No
- Cycle facilities: No

Other information
- Status: Construction – electric-line doubling
- Station code: STRK
- Zone(s): Northern Eastern Railway
- Division(s): Lucknow NER
Location
- Location within India Location within Uttar Pradesh

Sitapur Cutchery railway station is a small railway station in Sitapur district, Uttar Pradesh. Its code is STRK. It serves Sitapur city. The station consists of a single platform. The platform is not well sheltered. It lacks many facilities including water and sanitation.
