= Segowlie–Raxaul Railway =

Defunct railway company of India

Sagauli–Raxaul Railway
- Industry: Railways
- Defunct: 1920
- Successor: Tirhoot Railway
- Headquarters: India
- Area served: Northern India
- Services: Rail transport

Sagauli–Raxaul Railway was owned by the Segowlie–Raxaul Railway Company and worked by the Bengal and North Western Railway. The Sugauli–Raxaul Railway was absorbed by the Tirhoot Railway in around 1920.

== Notes ==
1. Rao, M.A. (1988). Indian Railways, New Delhi: National Book Trust, p. 37
2. Rao, M.A. (1988). Indian Railways, New Delhi: National Book Trust, pp. 42–3
3. Chapter 1 - Evolution of Indian Railways-Historical Background
