= Burhwal Junction railway station =

Railway station in Uttar Pradesh, India

Burhwal Junction

General information
- Location: Ramnagar - Fatehpur Rd, Burhwal, Uttar Pradesh; India
- Coordinates: 27.085880°N 81.389405°E
- Elevation: 115 metres (377 ft)
- System: Junction station
- Owner: Indian Railways
- Operator: East Central
- Line: Lucknow–Gorakhpur line
- Platforms: 4
- Tracks: 4

Construction
- Structure type: Standard on-ground
- Parking: Yes
- Accessible: Available

Other information
- Status: Functioning
- Station code: BUW
- Zone(s): North Eastern Railway zone
- Division(s): Lucknow

History
- Opened: 1885
Location
- Location within Uttar Pradesh Location within India
- Interactive map

Burhwal Junction railway station (Station code: BUW) is a railway station in Uttar Pradesh, India. It is operated by Indian Railways under the North Eastern Railway zone. The station serves both passenger and freight trains, connecting nearby towns and cities in the region. With multiple platforms and tracks, Burhwal Junction acts as a significant transit point for regional rail traffic, supporting local transportation and commerce. The station has been operational since 1885 and continues to play an important role in the rail network of Uttar Pradesh.

== Major Trains ==
● Krishak Express (15008/15009)

● Satyagrah Express (15274/15275)

● Avadh Assam Express (19037/19038)

● Saharsa–Chheharta (Amritsar) Amrit Bharat Express (14627/14628)

● Barauni–Gwalior Mail (11124/11125)
