= Domingarh railway station =

Railway station in Uttar Pradesh, India

Domingarh Railway Station
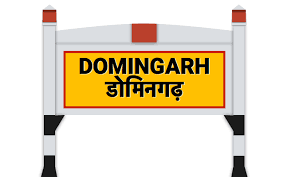

General information
- Location: Surajkund, Gorakhpur, Uttar Pradesh; India
- Coordinates: 26.7648°N 83.3413°E
- System: Regional rail and Light rail station
- Owner: Indian Railways
- Operator: North Eastern Railway
- Lines: Gorakhpur–Lucknow; Lucknow–Varanasi
- Platforms: 2
- Tracks: 4

Construction
- Structure type: standard on ground station
- Parking: Available
- Cycle facilities: Not available

Other information
- Station code: DMG

History
- Opened: 1995; 31 years ago
Location

Domingarh railway station (station code: DMG) is a railway station in Gorakhpur, Uttar Pradesh, India. It is an important railway station under the North Eastern Railway zone of Indian Railways and is administered by the Lucknow NER railway division. The station serves the western part of Gorakhpur and provides rail connectivity to destinations across Uttar Pradesh and neighbouring states.

Opened in 1995, the station was developed to cater to local passenger traffic and support train operations in the Gorakhpur region. In 2025, Domingarh became the first all-women-operated railway station in Gorakhpur and the second such station under the Lucknow Division of the North Eastern Railway.

== History ==
Domingarh railway station was opened in 1995 to serve the growing passenger traffic in the western part of Gorakhpur. Located about 6 km from Gorakhpur Junction railway station, the station was developed to improve rail connectivity and support train operations on the busy Gorakhpur–Lucknow corridor. The station was established as part of the expansion and modernization of the broad-gauge railway network in the region, and the route was later electrified under Indian Railways' network electrification programme.

In 2025, Domingarh railway station became the first all-women-operated railway station in Gorakhpur and the second such station under the Lucknow NER railway division. The station is managed entirely by women employees, who oversee station operations, ticketing, passenger services, signalling coordination, and security, marking a significant milestone in the North Eastern Railway's women empowerment initiatives.

== Women-led station initiative ==
The women-led station initiative at Domingarh railway station was introduced by the Lucknow NER railway division of the North Eastern Railway zone under Divisional Railway Manager, Mr. Gaurav Agarwal, with women employees assigned responsibility for the station's operational, commercial, passenger service, and security functions.

Under the initiative, women Station Masters manage train operations and signalling coordination in shifts, while women staff handle ticketing and passenger assistance services. Women personnel of the Railway Protection Force are responsible for security, surveillance, and crowd management at the station.

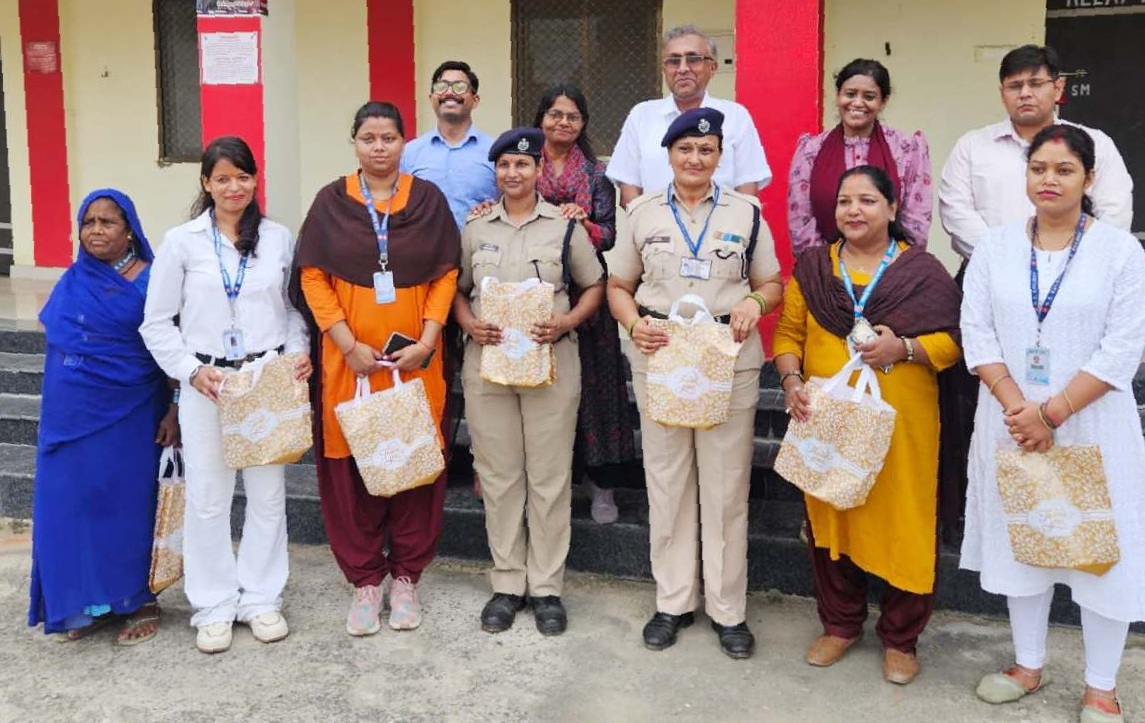

== Infrastructure ==
Domingarh railway station is a standard on-ground railway station on the Gorakhpur–Lucknow line under the North Eastern Railway zone. The station has two passenger platforms and multiple electrified broad-gauge tracks, enabling the operation of both passenger and Mail/Express trains. It is equipped with platform shelters, seating facilities, computerized ticketing counters, and a foot overbridge for passenger movement.

The station provides basic passenger amenities including waiting areas, drinking water, toilets, parking facilities, and an approach road connecting it to the surrounding areas of Gorakhpur. As part of railway infrastructure development in the region, the station is also expected to play an important role in easing congestion at Gorakhpur Junction railway station by supporting train operations on the Gorakhpur–Domingarh–Kusumhi corridor.
