= Babhnan =

Town in Uttar Pradesh, India

Coordinates: 26°56′04″N 82°30′14″E

Babhnan is an industrial town in the state of Uttar Pradesh, India. It is located in northeastern Uttar Pradesh, approximately 30 kilometers from the district headquarters of Basti and around 50 kilometers from Gonda.

== Demographics ==
The Babhnan Bazar Nagar Panchayat has population of 14,282 of which 7,514 are males while 6,768 are females as per report released by Census India 2011. Bhabnan Bazar 2024 - 2025 Population Current estimated population of Babhna Bazar Nagar Panchayat in 2025 is approximately 20,600. The schedule census of 2021 for Babhnan Bazar city is postponed due to covid. We believe new population census for Babhnan Bazar city will be conducted in 2025 and same will be updated once its done. The current data for Babhnan Bazar town are estimated only but all 2011 figures are accurate. The primary languages spoken are Hindi and Awadhi. Agriculture and small-scale trade are the mainstays of the local economy.

== Transportation ==
Babhnan is served by a Babhnan railway station that connects it to major cities like Gorakhpur, Lucknow, and Delhi.National Highway 28 is 17km away from the town which is connected through a State Highway with Babhnan. Public and private bus services are available for commuters and travelers.

== Economy ==
The town's economy is primarily agricultural, with sugarcane and rice being the main crops. Babhnan has a unit of Balrampur Chini mills Ltd. since 1975 & Distillery since 2002 ,Town also has small factories.
