= Chheharta railway station =

Railway station in Punjab, India

Chheharta

General information
- Location: Krishna Nagar, Har Gobind Pura, Amritsar, Punjab; India
- Coordinates: 31.6222°N 74.7946°E
- Elevation: 247 metres (810 ft)
- System: Indian Railways station
- Owner: Indian Railways
- Operator: Northern Railway
- Line: Amritsar–Jammu main line
- Platforms: 3
- Tracks: 2

Construction
- Structure type: At-grade
- Parking: Yes
- Accessible: Available

Other information
- Status: Functioning
- Station code: CIA
- Zone(s): Northern Railway zone
- Division(s): Firozpur
Location
- Location within Punjab Location within India
- Interactive map

Chheharta railway station (station code: CIA) is a railway station in Punjab, India. It is operated by Indian Railways situated under the Northern railway zone.The name “Chheharta” is derived from the Punjabi words "Chhe" (six) and "Harta" (Persian wheel), referring to the six Persian wheels of a large baoli (stepwell) located in the area. This stepwell was constructed under the supervision of Guru Arjan Dev Ji. Chheharta railway station has three platforms, one primarily for passenger trains and the others for freight operations. The station is strategically located near the India–Pakistan border, making it significant for cross-border trade and traffic. Indian Railways has allocated ₹60 crore for the development of Chheharta railway station. The project aims to upgrade the station as a satellite station, improving passenger facilities and enhancing freight-handling capacity.
