= Sahjanwan =

GIDA Sahjanwa Gorakhpur Industrial Area Sahjanwa
- Industrial Area
- Location in Gida gorakhpur Uttar Pradesh, India GIDA Sahjanwa Gorakhpur (India)
- Coordinates: 26°45′N 83°13′E
- Country: India
- State: Uttar Pradesh
- District: Gorakhpur

Area
  - Total: 1,210 km^{2} (470 sq mi)

Population (2001)
  - Total: 25,091
  - Density: 20.7/km^{2} (53.7/sq mi)

Languages
  - Official: Hindi
- Time zone: UTC+5:30 (IST)
- PIN: 273209
- Website: up.gov.in

GIDA Sahjanwan is industrial area of Gorakhpur in the state of Uttar Pradesh. It is fast developing an industrial area abbreviated as GIDA with many factories, including IGL, Parle and ARP, as well as power looms, plywood and the only jute mill in Uttar Pradesh.

== Demographics ==
According to the Census of India in 2001, Sahjanwa had a population of 25,091. Males constitute 53% of the population and females 47%. Sahjanwa has an average literacy rate of 57%, lower than India's national average of 59.5%. Male literacy is 70%, and female literacy is 43%. In Sahjanwa 17% of the population is 6 or younger. Sahjanwa is in the eastern part of Uttar Pradesh. Hindi is the customary language.

== Education ==
The two main intermediate colleges are BholaRam Maskara Intermediate College and Murari Intermediate College. The founders are Jyoti Prakash Maskara, owner of The Mahabir Jute Mill and Murari Lal Ji. Murari Intermediate College is one of the oldest colleges in the town.

=== Schools ===
- Buddha Institute Of Technology
- Little Flower Sr. Sec. School
- Tarachand Agrawal Saraswati Vidya Mandir
- Gopal Shishu Mandir
- St. Joseph School
- Navals National Academy
- Maa Sarswati Shishu Mandir Higher Secondary School
- St. Xavier's School
- Draupadi Devi Gita Devi Sarswati Vidhya Mandir Purv Madhyamik Vidhyalay
- Purvanchal College of Higher Education (Formerly-Divya Technical Degree College)
- Smt Barfa Devi Saraswati Gyan Mandir Sahjanwa
- T.N Memorial Public School, Sahjanwa
- DDU Mahavidyalay Sahjanwa Gorakhpur 273209
- Swami Vivekanand Academy Sahjanwa Gorakhpur 273209

== Economy ==
=== Manufacturing ===
Located in the Industrial park (GIDA) of the Gorakhpur are:

- 1000 megawatt distribution center of Indo – Bhutan (TALA Pariyogana)
- The Mahaveer Jute Mill (India's second Jute Mill in working)
- India Glycols Limited
- Gallant Ispat Ltd
- Azam Rubber Products
- Hindustan petroleum corp.lmt
- Tripathi Construction Pvt. Ltd
- Indian oil corporation limited
- IT Park(upcoming)

=== Transport ===
Sahjanwan has a passenger railway station with trains that go to main railway station of Gorakhpur i.e., Gorakhpur Junction and it also has trains which go to Lucknow. In addition, buses lead to and stop at Gida Gorakhpur
