= Saraigarh Junction railway station =

Railway station in Bihar, India

Saraygarh Junction

General information
- Location: Station Road, Saraigarh, Bhaptiyahi, Supaul district, Bihar; India
- Coordinates: 26.2935°N 86.7379°E
- Elevation: 51 metres (167 ft)
- System: Junction station
- Owner: Indian Railways
- Operator: East Central
- Line: Saharsa–Forbesganj line
- Platforms: 4
- Tracks: 1

Construction
- Structure type: Standard on-ground
- Parking: Yes
- Accessible: Available

Other information
- Status: Functioning
- Station code: SRGR
- Zone(s): East Central Railway zone
- Division(s): Samastipur

History
- Opened: 15 November 1885
- Rebuilt: Under progress
Location
- Location within Bihar Location within India

Saraigarh Junction railway station (station code: SRGR) is a railway station on the Saharsa–Forbesganj line in the East Central Railway zone of Indian Railways. It serves the town of Saraigarh in Supaul district, Bihar. The station falls under the Samastipur railway division.

== History ==
Saraigarh Junction was established during the British colonial period as part of the Tirhut Railway. The Saharsa–Forbesganj line, including Saraigarh, was inaugurated on 15 November 1887. Over the years, the station developed into a junction, handling both passenger and freight services. Its location along SH76 made it a convenient hub for regional connectivity and trade, supporting the growth of Supaul district and nearby towns.

== Overview ==
It lies on the Saharsa–Forbesganj line of the East Central Railway under the Samastipur railway division. The station has four platforms and handles around 1,400 passengers daily. Despite being a rural station, Saraigarh plays a key role in connecting nearby towns and villages to larger cities in Bihar.

== Electrification ==
The electrification work in this region was completed around 2021–2022, enabling electric locomotives to operate through the station. This development has improved train speed, efficiency, and reduced dependence on diesel engines.

== Upcoming projects ==
Indian Railways has planned several improvements for Saraigarh Junction railway station. Among the key projects are:

● Doubling of tracks on the Saharsa–Forbesganj route to improve capacity and reduce congestion.

● Enhanced passenger amenities, including upgraded waiting halls, drinking water, and improved seating arrangements.

● Better connectivity with nearby towns in Supaul district through the addition of more passenger and DEMU services.

== Redevelopment Station ==
As part of the Amrit Bharat Station Scheme, Saraigarh Junction has been identified for phased redevelopment. The proposed plans include:

- Construction of a modern station building with improved design and passenger-friendly facilities
- Upgraded platforms with better shelter, lighting, and digital display boards
- Development of clean waiting rooms, toilets, and circulating areas for smoother passenger movement
- Provision for parking space and improved approach roads to handle increasing passenger traffic
