= Basti railway station =

Railway station in Uttar Pradesh, India

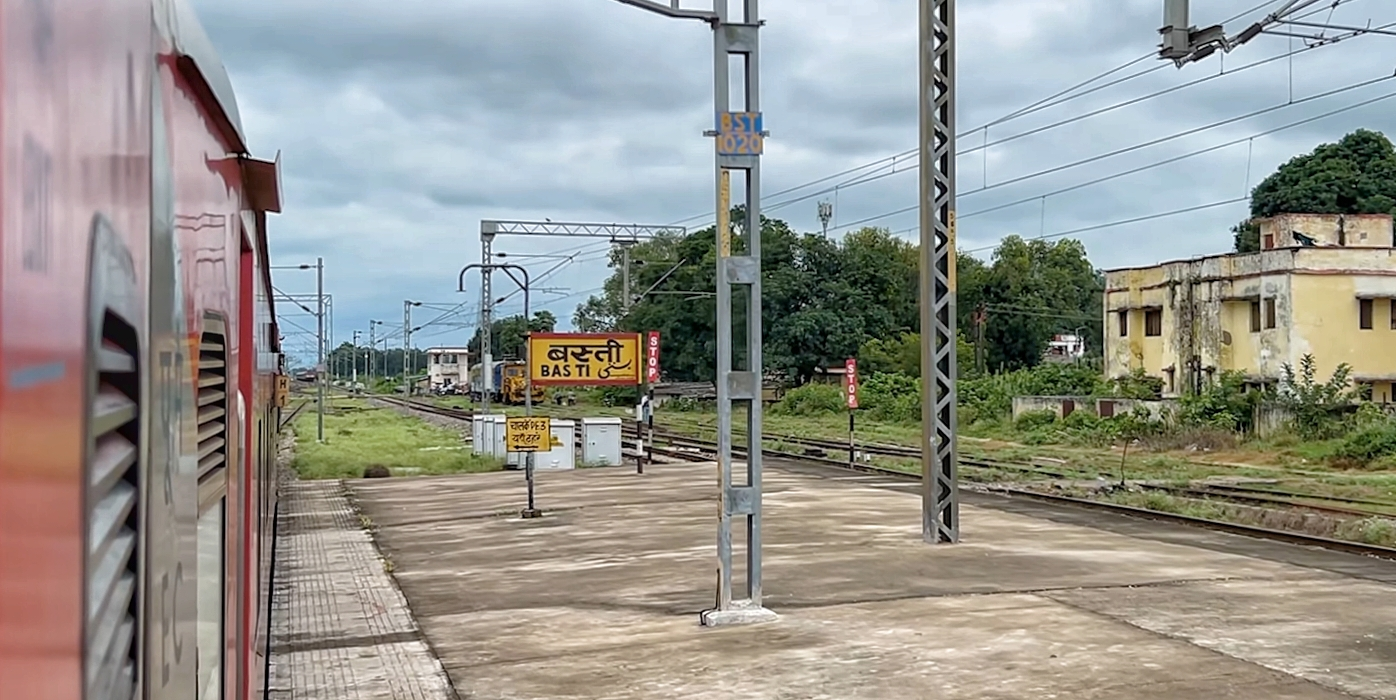
- Basti Railway Station

General information
- Location: Basti, Uttar Pradesh, India
- Coordinates: 26.8154°N 82.7692°E
- Elevation: 101 metres (331 ft)
- System: Indian Railways station
- Owner: Indian Railways
- Operator: North Eastern Railway
- Line: Broad Gauge
- Platforms: 5
- Tracks: 7
- Connections: Auto stand

Construction
- Structure type: At grade
- Parking: Yes
- Cycle facilities: Yes

Other information
- Status: Double electric line
- Station code: BST
- Zone(s): North Eastern Railway
- Division(s): Lucknow NER

History
- Opened: 1872
- Rebuilt: redevelopment station

Passengers
- Daily: 1.5 lakh daily

Services
A1 class
Location
- Location within India Location within Uttar Pradesh

Basti railway station is a main railway station in Basti district, Uttar Pradesh. Its code is BST. It serves Basti city. The station consists of seven platforms.

It is a very important railway station of North Eastern Railway zone. The main line connecting Lucknow with Gorakhpur and places in Bihar and Assam in the east passes through the south of the district. It has various facilities like escalator, elevator, free wifi, automatic ticket vending machines, food stall, parking, toilet, water supply 24 hours, train information display board, waiting hall, etc. The station offer Class A-1 station facilities. This station is a first electrified station of North eastern Railway. This station is very main station between Gorakhpur-barabanki-Aishbag line. There is a daily Intercity express between Gorakhpur and Lucknow. The station is well connected to Delhi, Mumbai, Pataliputra, Lucknow, Ajmer, Ahmedabad, Hyderabad, Bangalore, Varanasi, Thiruvananthapuram, Chennai, Jammu, Howrah, Jaipur.

Important trains are Bapudham Motihari - Anand Vihar Terminal Amrit Bharat Express, Vande Bharat, Dibrugarh–Gomti Nagar (Lucknow) Amrit Bharat Express, Gorakhdham Express, Vaishali Express, Raptisagar Express, Gorakhpur–Lokmanya Tilak Terminus Superfast Express, Gorakhpur–Anand Vihar Terminal Humsafar Express (via Basti), Satyagrah Express, Garib Rath, Kamakhya–Anand Vihar Weekly Express, Antyodaya Express, Poorbiya express, Godda gomti nagar express, Amrit bharat, and many more. Manwar Sangam Express & GKP–BST–GKP Special train originates and terminates at Basti . The Basti district is served by 6 local railway stations other than Basti railway station, namely, Babhnan(BV), Tinich, Gaur, Govind Nagar, Orwara, & Munderwa, among them Babhnan railway station (BV) is second important and Biggest railway station after Basti in Basti District.
