= Padrauna railway station =

Railway Station in Uttar Pradesh, India

General information
- Location: Station Road, Padrauna, Uttar Pradesh; India
- Coordinates: 26°53′51″N 83°58′59″E
- Elevation: 89 metres (292 ft)
- System: Regional rail station
- Owner: Indian Railways
- Operator: North Eastern Railway
- Line: Gorakhpur–Siwan(Via Thawe)
- Platforms: 2
- Tracks: 3
- Connections: Taxi stand

Construction
- Structure type: Standard (on ground station)
- Parking: Yes
- Cycle facilities: NO
- Accessible: Yes

Other information
- Status: Functioning
- Station code: POU
- Zone(s): North Eastern Railway
- Division(s): Varanasi

History
- Opened: 1907; 119 years ago
- Former names: Bengal and North Western Railway; Northern Railway
Location
- Location within Uttar Pradesh

Padrauna railway station is on the Gorakhpur–Thawe line. It is about 77 km from Gorakhpur railway station and is situated towards its north-eastern part. It is situated about 20 km from Kushinagar, an international tourist and religious spot for Buddhists. It serves Padrauna city in the Indian state of Uttar Pradesh.

== Railway station ==
Padrauna railway station is at an elevation of 89 metres (292 ft) and was assigned the code – POU. Padrauna railway station is one of the important railway station of kushinagar district because of being the district headquarter.

== History ==
Bengal and North Western Railway constructed the 79 mi (127 km) long 1,000 mm (3 ft 3 3/8 in)-wide metre-gauge line from Siwan to Kaptanganj in 1907.

The Kaptanganj–Thawe section was converted to 5 ft 6 in (1,676 mm) broad gauge in 2011.

== Passengers ==
Padrauna railway station handles around 18,000 passengers every day.

Preceding station	Indian Railways	Following station
Barharaganj towards ?	North Eastern Railway zone Gorakhpur–Thawe branch line	Kath Kuiyan towards ?
