= Tamkuhi Road railway station =

Railway Station in Uttar Pradesh, India

Tamkuhi Road Railway Station
- Indian Railways logo

General information
- Location: Agency Road, Tamkuhi Road, Kushinagar district, Uttar Pradesh; India
- Coordinates: 26.7244665°N 84.225471°E
- Elevation: 84 metres (276 ft)
- System: Indian Railways station
- Owner: Indian Railways
- Operator: North Eastern Railway
- Line: Kaptanganj–Thawe section
- Platforms: 2
- Tracks: 3

Construction
- Structure type: Standard (on-ground station)
- Parking: No
- Cycle facilities: No
- Accessible: No

Other information
- Status: Single diesel line
- Station code: TOI
- Zone(s): North Eastern Railway
- Division(s): Varanasi

History
- Opened: 1907
- Rebuilt: 2011
- Former names: Bengal and North Western Railway
Location
- Location within India Location within Uttar Pradesh

Tamkuhi Road railway station is a second important railway station of Kushinagar district after Padrauna (District Headquarters, kushinagar) (popularly known for its international buddha pilgrimage) of Uttar Pradesh. Its code is TOI. It serves Tamkuhi Road town. The station consists of two platforms. The platforms are not well sheltered. It lacks many facilities including water and sanitation.

Tamkuhi Road was part of Bengal and North Western Railway constructed the 79 mi (127 km)-long 1,000 mm (3 ft 3 3/8 in)-wide metre-gauge line from Siwan to Kaptanganj in 1907.

The Kaptanganj–Thawe section was converted to 1,676 mm (5 ft 6 in)-wide 5 ft 6 in (1,676 mm) broad gauge in 2011. https://m.facebook.com/satya5108946/
