= Tirhut Railway =

Railway in Northern India

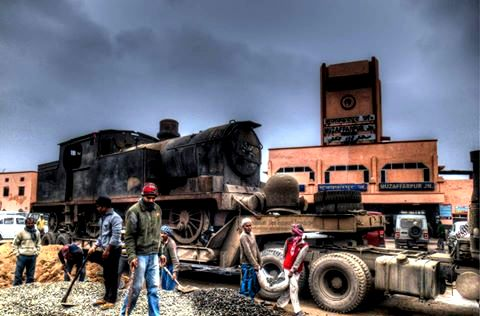
- View of the remains of the 100 Year old Coal Locomotive of Tirhut Railways.
- Industry: Railways
- Predecessor: none
- Defunct: 1 January 1943
- Successor: Oudh and Tirhut Railway
- Headquarters: India
- Area served: Northern India
- Services: Rail transport

Tirhut Railway (originally Tirhoot State Railway) was originally owned by the Raj Darbhanga and later by the provincial government. Its ownership was later transferred to the Government of India which operated it as part of the Indian State Railways from opening to late 1886, as the Tirhoot Railway from late 1886 to 30 June 1890 and by the Bengal and North Western Railway from 1 July 1890. Tirhoot Railway absorbed the Segowlie-Raxaul Railway is around 1920. The Tirhut Railway was merged into the Oudh and Tirhut Railway on 1 January 1943.

In 1874 the first railway line in North Bihar of Tirhoot State Rly was laid from the Darbhanga palace compound (where the place is still marked by the now Kameshwar Singh University) to Bajitpur on the banks of Ganges opposite Barh via Samastipur as the first line for general transport in the Tirhoot Division at the prompting of the Maharaja Lakshmishwar Singh.

== Stations ==
Here are some stations opened by Tirhut railway.

Railway stations and their opening years
No.	Railway station	Opened
1	Darbhanga Junction railway station	1875
2	Saharsa Junction railway station	1887
3	Muzaffarpur Junction railway station	1875
4	Supaul railway station	1860
5	Saraigarh Junction railway station	1885
6	Sitamarhi Junction railway station	1890
7	Madhubani railway station	1906

== See also ==
- Rail transport in India#History
