= Supaul junction railway station =

Railway station in Bihar, India

Supaul
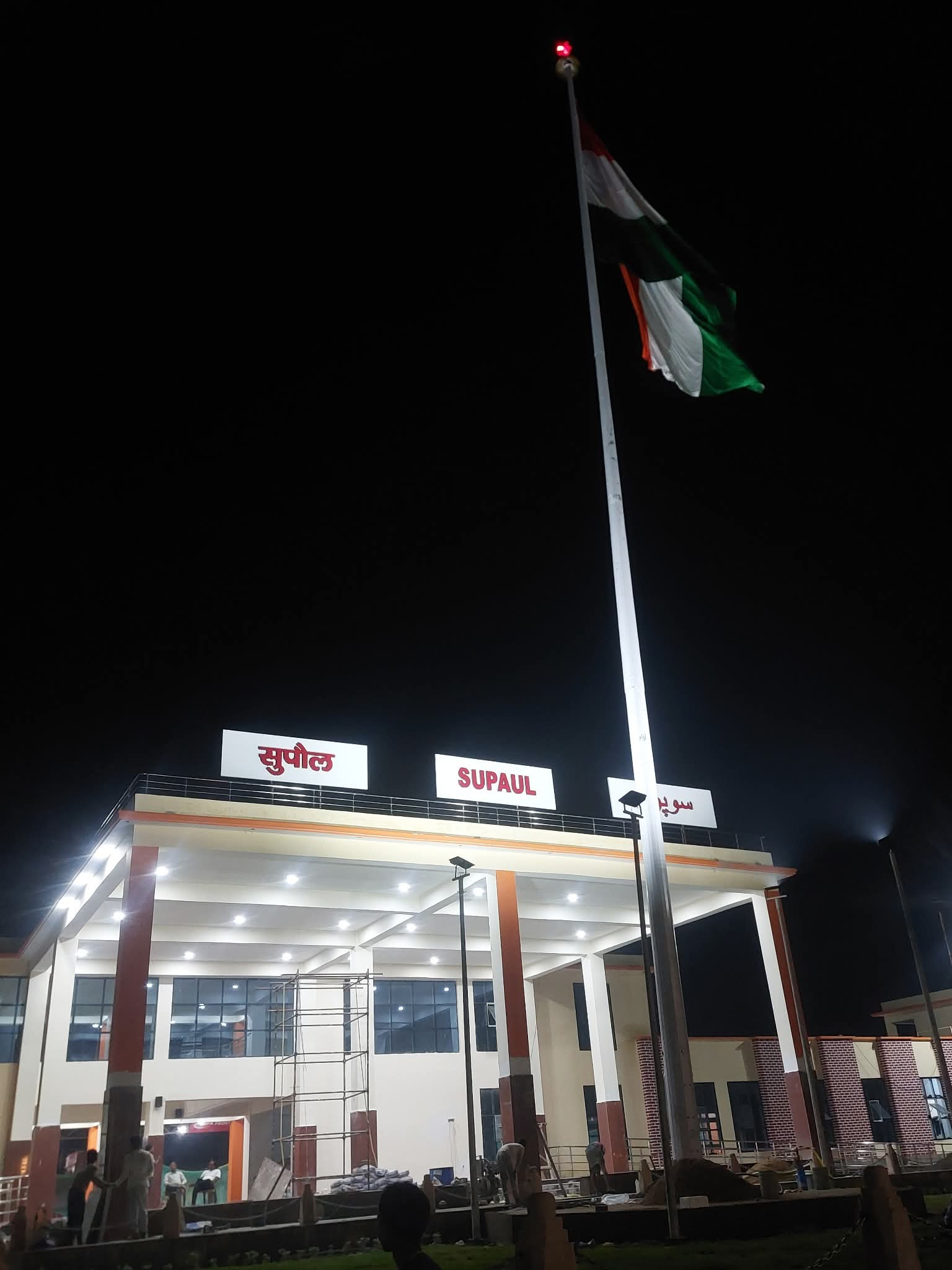
- Supaul Railway Station Main Entrance

General information
- Location: Supaul Railway Station, Station Road, Off NH-327, Supaul, Bihar; India
- Coordinates: 26.1176°N 86.6030°E
- Elevation: 51 metres (167 ft)
- System: Indian Railways station
- Owner: Indian Railways
- Operator: East Central
- Platforms: 3

Construction
- Structure type: At-grade
- Parking: Yes
- Accessible: Available

Other information
- Status: Functioning
- Station code: SOU
- Zone(s): East Central Railway zone
- Division(s): Samastipur

History
- Opened: 1887
- Closed: -

Passengers
- Daily: 2,700+
Location
- Location within Bihar Location within India
- Interactive map

Supaul junction railway station (station code: SOU) is a railway station serving the town of Supaul in Supaul district, Bihar, India. It falls under the Samastipur railway division of the East Central Railway zone of Indian Railways. The station lies on the Saharsa–Forbesganj line, which connects Supaul to major regional centres such as Saharsa, Madhepura, and Forbesganj.

== History ==
Supaul junction railway station was made in 1887 by Tirhut Railways in British raj .It is one of the oldest station in Kosi Subregion.

== Overview ==
Supaul junction railway station plays an important role in serving the Kosi region of Bihar, providing rail connectivity for both passenger and freight services. It is one of the key railway hubs in northeastern Bihar and serves as a transit point for travellers from nearby districts including Madhubani, Araria, and Madhepura.

The station consists of two platforms and multiple tracks, with facilities such as a booking office, foot overbridge, and basic passenger amenities. In recent years, Supaul has gained prominence due to its inclusion in the Amrit Bharat Station Scheme, under which it is being redeveloped into a modern, eco-friendly, and passenger-friendly station.

== Redevelopment ==
Supaul junction railway station is undergoing redevelopment under the Amrit Bharat Station Scheme, an initiative of the Indian Railways aimed at transforming stations into modern, world-class facilities. The redevelopment focuses on enhancing passenger convenience, accessibility, and overall infrastructure quality.

A new railway line was made in 2025 -2026 from supaul (Sou) to Triveniganj via aham pipra.

Under this project, the station will see improvements in station access, circulating areas, waiting halls, and platforms. The plan also includes integrating the station with the surrounding city area and providing modern amenities such as free Wi-Fi, improved passenger information systems, and facilities for persons with disabilities.

=== Key details ===
Supaul junction railway station is among 92 stations in Bihar selected for redevelopment under the Amrit Bharat Station Scheme.

- Scope: The project follows a continuous and long-term approach to upgrade station amenities. Key components include:
  - Upgrading station access and circulating areas
  - Renovation of waiting halls and restrooms
  - Enhancement of platform surfacing and roofing
  - Installation of modern passenger information systems
  - Provision of free Wi-Fi and kiosks promoting local products
- Integration: The redevelopment plan envisions connecting both sides of the city through the station premises and ensuring multimodal integration for improved connectivity.
- Sustainability: The design emphasizes eco-friendly and sustainable solutions, including energy-efficient systems and environmentally responsible construction

== Trains ==
Train Schedule
Train No.	Train Name	From - To	Type	Arrival	Departure	Days	Classes
13214	SHC JBN Express	Saharsa Jn (SHC) - Jogbani (JBN)	Mail Express	00:35	01:05	Daily	SLRD, GEN, SL, 2A, 3A
15502	JBN RXL Express	Jogbani (JBN) - Raxaul Jn (RXL)	Mail Express	01:30	02:00	Tue, Fri	GEN, 3A, SL
05515	LLP SHC Special	Lalitgram (LLP) - Saharsa Jn (SHC)	Train On Demand	SRC	03:45	Daily	—
75218	FBG-DBG DMU	Forbesganj Jn (FBG) - Darbhanga Jn (DBG)	DMU	04:00	04:15	Daily	GEN
15509	Rajya Rani Express	Lalitgram (LLP) - Patna Jn (PNBE)	Mail Express	SRC	04:45	Daily	—
13211	JBN DNR Express	Jogbani (JBN) - Danapur (DNR)	Mail Express	06:15	06:45	Daily	—
75202	SHC-FBG DMU	Saharsa Jn (SHC) - Forbesganj Jn (FBG)	DMU	09:30	09:50	Daily	GEN
75201	FBG-SHC DMU	Forbesganj Jn (FBG) - Saharsa Jn (SHC)	DMU	12:15	12:35	Daily	GEN
13212	DNR JBN Express	Danapur (DNR) - Jogbani (JBN)	Mail Express	13:30	14:00	Daily	—
14603	Jansadharan Express	Narpatganj (NPV) - Amritsar Jn (ASR)	Mail Express	13:45	14:15	Fri	—
05737	NKE NJP Puja Special	Narkatiaganj Jn (NKE) - New Jalpaiguri Jn (NJP)	Train On Demand	14:15	14:40	Mon	—
75206	SHC-SRGR-LLP DMU	Saharsa Jn (SHC) - Lalitgram (LLP)	DMU	17:30	DSTN	Daily	GEN
05516	SHC LLP Special	Saharsa Jn (SHC) - Lalitgram (LLP)	Train On Demand	18:10	DSTN	Daily	—
75205	LLP-SRGR-SHC DMU	Lalitgram (LLP) - Saharsa Jn (SHC)	DMU	SRC	18:15	Daily	GEN
13213	JBN SHC Express	Jogbani (JBN) - Saharsa Jn (SHC)	Mail Express	18:35	19:05	Daily	SLRD, GEN, SL, 2A, 3A
15510	Rajya Rani Express	Patna Jn (PNBE) - Lalitgram (LLP)	Mail Express	19:00	DSTN	Daily	—
15501	RXL JBN Express	Raxaul Jn (RXL) - Jogbani (JBN)	Mail Express	19:50	20:20	Mon, Thu	GEN, SL, 3A
05738	NJP NKE Special	New Jalpaiguri Jn (NJP) - Narkatiaganj Jn (NKE)	Train On Demand	20:25	20:50	Sun	—
14604	Jansadharan Express	Amritsar Jn (ASR) - Narpatganj (NPV)	Mail Express	22:00	22:30	Thu	—
75217	DBG-FBG DMU	Darbhanga Jn (DBG) - Forbesganj Jn (FBG)	DMU	22:50	23:05	Daily	GEN
05736	KIR ASR Special	Katihar Jn (KIR) - Amritsar Jn (ASR)	Train On Demand	23:45	00:15	Thu	—

== See also ==
Lalitgram railway station
