= Babhnan railway station =

Railway station in Uttar Pradesh

- Indian Railways logo

General information
- Location: Babhnan, Basti & Gonda Districts, Uttar Pradesh, India
- Coordinates: 26.938296°N 82.501816°E
- Elevation: 99 metres (325 ft)
- System: Indian Railways station
- Owner: Indian Railways
- Operator: North Eastern Railway
- Line: Double electrified line
- Platforms: 2
- Tracks: 4
- Connections: Auto stand

Construction
- Structure type: At grade
- Parking: Yes
- Accessible: Available

Other information
- Status: Operating
- Station code: BV
- Zone(s): Northern Eastern Railway
- Division(s): Lucknow NER

History
- Opened: 15 January 1885
- Rebuilt: 1981

Passengers
- 20,000-25,000

Services
Passenger and Freight services
Location
- Location within India Location within Uttar Pradesh

Babhnan railway station is a railway station in Basti & Gonda districts, Uttar Pradesh. Its code is BV. Basti railway station is 30 km from Babhnan station. It serves Babhnan. The station consists of two platforms and has various facilities available.Many express and superfast trains stop at this station.

Babhnan railway station is known for nearby mills and mandirs.
