= Khalilabad railway station =

Railway Station in Uttar Pradesh, India

- Indian Railways logo

General information
- Location: Khalilabad, Uttar Pradesh; India
- Coordinates: 26.7751°N 83.0550°E
- Elevation: 83 metres (272 ft)
- System: Indian Railways station
- Owner: Indian Railways
- Operator: North Eastern Railway
- Line: Lucknow gonda gorakhpur main line
- Platforms: 3
- Tracks: 5(3 platform tracks+1mainline track+1goods train track)
- Connections: Auto stand

Construction
- Structure type: At grade
- Parking: Yes
- Cycle facilities: No

Other information
- Status: Double electric line
- Station code: KLD
- Zone(s): North Eastern Railway
- Division(s): Lucknow NER
Location
- Location within India Location within Uttar Pradesh

Khalilabad railway station, located in Sant Kabir Nagar district, Uttar Pradesh, serves the city of Khalilabad. With the station code KLD, it features three platforms, all of which are well sheltered.

The station is situated on the Gorakhpur–Basti–Lucknow line.
