= Lucknow NER railway division =

Railway division of India

Lucknow NER railway division is one of the three railway divisions under the jurisdiction of North Eastern Railway zone of the Indian Railways. This railway division was formed on 14 April 1952.

Izzatnagar railway division (at Bareilly City) and Varanasi railway division are the other two railway divisions under NER Zone headquartered at Gorakhpur.

== List of railway stations and towns ==
The list includes the stations under the Lucknow NER railway division and their station category.

Category of station	No. of stations	Names of stations
A-1	3	Gorakhpur Junction, Lucknow Junction, Basti railway station
A	2	Gonda Junction railway station, Khalilabad railway station
B	8	Bahraich railway station, Aishbagh, Mankapur Junction railway station, Babhnan railway station, Sitapur Cutchery railway station, Lakhimpur railway station
C (suburban station)	-	-
D	33	Barhni, Gomti Nagar, Jarwal Road, Lucknow City, Rawatpur,
E	75	Katra,
F halt station	38	-
Total	157	-

Stations closed for Passengers -
