= Lucknow–Gorakhpur line =

Indian railway line

Lucknow–Gorakhpur line with Shahjahanpur–Burhwal Branch line
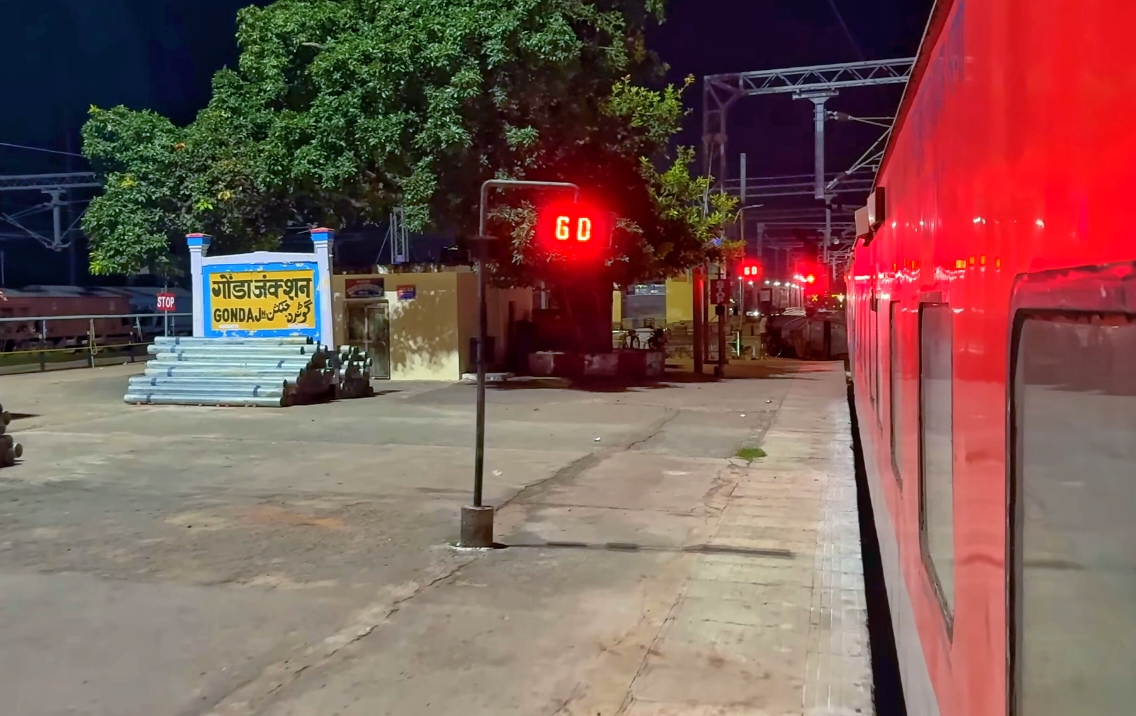
- Gonda Junction is an important Railway Station on Lucknow–Gorakhpur line

Overview
- Status: Operational
- Owner: Indian Railways
- Locale: Uttar Pradesh, India
- Termini: Lucknow Charbagh; Gorakhpur Junction

Service
- Operator(s): Northern Railway & North Eastern Railway

History
- Opened: 15 January 1885

Technical
- Track length: 277 km (172 mi)
- Number of tracks: 2
- Track gauge: 5 ft 6 in (1,676 mm) broad gauge
- Electrification: Yes
- Operating speed: 110 km/h

The Lucknow–Gorakhpur line is a railway route in Uttar Pradesh. It is classified as 'B special class' according to Indian Railways standards, and its trains can reach up to 123 kilometres per hour (76 mph) on this line. The line is doubled broad gauge and electrified, and it is the first fully electrified railway line of the North Eastern Railway zone.

This line is one of the busiest in eastern and central Uttar Pradesh. It connects Assam, West Bengal, North Bihar and eastern Uttar Pradesh to Delhi, Haryana, Punjab, Jammu and Kashmir and Uttarakhand. Trains for Mumbai, Rajasthan and Gujarat are also connected to this line.

Major stations on this line include Barabanki, Gonda and Basti.

== History ==
This line was constructed by the Bengal and North Western Railway during the 19th century and 20th century. It was opened in seven phases during the construction period.

- The first phase, between Barabanki and Burhwal Junction was opened on 1 April 1872.
- The second phase, between Burhwal Junction and Bahramghat was opened on 24 November 1896.
- The third phase, between Bahramghat and Jarwal Road was opened on 18 December 1896.
- The fourth phase, between Jarwal Road and Colonelganj was opened on 1 February 1892.
- The fifth phase, between Colonelganj and Gonda was opened on 29 October 1881.
- The sixth phase, between Gonda and Mankapur was opened on 2 April 1884.
- The seventh phase, from Mankapur to Gorakhpur Junction was opened on 15 January 1885.

The branch line from Burhwal Junction to Shahjahanpur was opened on 13 March 1911.

On 1 January 1943, this line was transferred from the initial jurisdiction to Oudh Tirhut Railway, after the amalgamation of: Bengal and North Western Railway, the Tirhut Railway, Mashrak-Thawe Extension Railway, Rohilkund and Kumaon Railway Company.

After that, on 14 April 1952, this line was transferred to the jurisdiction of North Eastern Railway, after the amalgamation of Oudh Tirhut Railway and Assam Railway Company.

== Main line and branches ==
The main line of the Lucknow–Basti–Gorakhpur section is 277 km (172 mi), and also features a branch line which connects to Shahjahanpur from Burhwal Junction with a length of 188 km (117 mi), and joins to the Lucknow–Moradabad line.

== Projects ==
There is a plan to double the branch line of Burhwal Junction to Shahjahanpur Junction with electrification. This was approved in 2016 and with a tenure of five years. 90km (56 mi) of new line will be constructed between Basti (Uttar Pradesh) to Kapilvastu (NEPAL). One more proposed platform will be constructed in the Basti district.
