= Katehri =

- Town
- Location in Uttar Pradesh, India Katehri (India)
- Coordinates: 26.431°N 82.540°E
- Country: India
- State: Uttar Pradesh
- District: Ambedkar Nagar
- Elevation: 133 m (436 ft)

Population (2001)
  - Total: 3,000

Languages
  - Official: Hindi
- Time zone: UTC+5:30 (IST)
- Telephone code: 05278
- Vehicle registration: UP
- Website: up.gov.in

Katehri, also spelled as Katehari, is a town in Ambedkar Nagar district in the Indian state of Uttar Pradesh. Katehri is also a block in Ambedkar Nagar district, Uttar Pradesh.

Katehari is a constituency of the Uttar Pradesh Legislative Assembly covering the city of Katehari in the Ambedkar Nagar district of Uttar Pradesh, India.

Katehari
Constituency Details
Country	India
State	Uttar Pradesh
District	Ambedkar Nagar
Reservation	None
Member of Legislative Assembly
Current MLA	Dharmraj Nishad
Party	BJP
Elected year	2024

Katehari is one of five assembly constituencies in the Ambedkar Nagar Lok Sabha constituency. Since 2008, this assembly constituency is numbered 277 amongst 403 constituencies.

Katehri is also having a Railway station which is recently renovated by Indian Railway. It is now having fully electrified route.

School and Colleges in Katehari

1- Junior Madhyamik School, Katehari

2- Primary (English medium) School, Katehari

3- Ram Dev Janta Inter college, Katehari

4- BBS Public School, Katehari

5- Vedmurti Taponishtha Shree Ram Sharma Acharya Inter college, Katehari

6- Dev Bal School, Katehari

7- Dev Indravati PG College, Katehari

8- Vidushi College of Pharmacy, Katehari

9- Dashrath Verma Mahavidylaya, Katehari

10-Malti Modern Public Inter college, Katehari

== Nearly Kasba ==
1. Akbarpur 11KM
2. Tanda 25KM
3. Jalalpur 32KM
4. Baskhari 27KM
5. Rajesultanpur 82KM
6. Jahangir Ganj 65KM
