= Bilariaganj =

Municipal Corporation City in Uttar Pradesh, India

- City
- Location in Uttar Pradesh, India
- Coordinates: 26.2°N 83.23°E
- Country: India
- State: Uttar Pradesh
- District: Azamgarh
- Established: 2022
- Founder: Yogi Adityanath (Chief Minister of Uttar Pradesh)

Government
  - Type: Municipal corporation
  - Body: Nagar Palika Parishad Bilariaganj

Area
  - Total: 183 km^{2} (71 sq mi)
  - Rank: 2 in district
- Elevation: 104 m (341 ft)

Population (2022)
  - Total: 104,332
  - Rank: 2 in district
  - Density: 570/km^{2} (1,480/sq mi)

Languages
  - Official: Hindi, Bhojpuri
- Time zone: UTC+5:30 (IST)
- Postal code: 276121
- Vehicle registration: UP 50 __ ____
- Website: http://www.nppbilariaganj.in

Bilariaganj is the second largest city and a nagar palika parishad in Azamgarh division after its capital city Azamgarh in the state of Uttar Pradesh, India.

== Geography ==
Bilariaganj is located at 26.2°N 83.23°E. It has an average elevation of 104 metres (341 feet).

Bilariaganj city is separated into a few market places such as Qasimganj, Bajrang Nagar, Bhimbar, Andakhor, Jaigahan and Ismailpur Goria.

== Demographics ==
As of 2001 India census, Bilariaganj had a population of 104,332. Males constitute 49.7% of the population and females 50.3%. Bilariaganj has an average literacy rate of 67%, higher than the national average of 59.5%; with male literacy of 73% and female literacy of 61%. 16% of the population is under 6 years of age.

== Road ==
Bilariaganj city has good road connectivity, connecting the city to all over Uttar Pradesh and all over India.

Purvanchal Expressway connects the city to the state capital city Lucknow. It also connects to Ayodhya, Sultanpur, Barabanki and various regions of India.

National Highway 233B (India) connects the city to Varanasi, Azamgarh, Atraulia, Baskhari, Tanda, Bansi, Basti, and Lumbini.

Bilariaganj has also a few state highways which connect the city from various regions such as Azamgarh, Mau, Ballia, Ambedkar Nagar, Gorakhpur, Ayodhya, Dohrighat, Khalilabad, Ghazipur, Jaunpur, and Shahganj.

Some local roads also present which connect the city to some small towns of Azamgarh District such as Maharajganj, Jiyanpur, Azmatgarh, Rajesultanpur, Kaptanganj and Latghat.

== Railway ==
The nearest railway station of Bilariaganj city is Azamgarh Railway Station which is highly connected to all over India.

Hundreds of trains run from here to various parts of the country, of which the following are important:

- Kaifiyat Express - Azamgarh - Akbarpur - Ayodhya - Barabanki - Lucknow - Kanpur Central - Aligarh - Tundla Junction - Ghaziabad- Old Delhi
- Godan Express - Gorakhpur - Azamgarh - Lokmanya Tilak Terminus / CPR LTT Express - Chapra - Azamgarh - Lokmanya Tilak Terminus
- Mangal Pandey Express / AMH KOAA Express - Azamgarh - Kolkata
- Sabarmati Express - Darbhanga - Azamgarh - Ahmedabad
- Utsarg Express - Tata Nagar - Chapra - Azamgarh - Kanpur Central - Farrukhabad
- Tapti Ganga Express - Chapra - Azamgarh - Surat

== Air ==
Azamgarh Airport is situated in Bilariaganj region which is a domestic flights operating airport and developing as an international airport.

== Notable places ==
- Narottam Bramha Baba Temple
- Shiv Temple (New Chowk)
- Qasimganj Bazar
- Jharkhande Mahadev Temple
- Shri Panchdev Dham Santosi Maa Temple

== Education ==
Bilariaganj city has a few big educational institutions which are famous for their education and discipline.

- Jamiatul Falah
- Adarsh Inter College
- Muneshwar Devnandan Girls P. G. College
- Narottam Bramha Inter College
- Shikshak Intermediate College
- Rahul Sankrityayan College of Pharmacy
- Sanskrit Pathsala, Sundarpur
- Swami Sahjanand Polytechnic College & Industrial Training Institute
- Pt. Nagina College of Pharma
