= Aannapur =

- Village
- Location in Uttar Pradesh, India Aannapur (India)
- Coordinates: 26.333°N 82.445°E
- Country: India
- State: Uttar Pradesh
- Division: Faizabad
- Tehsil: Alapur
- Elevation: 91 m (299 ft)
  - Rank: 1,343
  - Density: 2/km^{2} (5.2/sq mi)

Languages
  - Official: Hindi
- Time zone: UTC+5:30 (IST)
- Postal code: 224181
- Telephone code: +91-5450
- Vehicle registration: UP45 XXXX
- Website: http://ambedkarnagar.nic.in/TahseelSite/Alapur.html

Aannapur is a village in the town of Allapur, Uttar Pradesh, India. Mundera is Tehsil (administrative division) of Allapur and belongs to the Faizabad city division. The Prithvipur village headquarters is 35 km away in Akbarpur.

== Caste ==
Aannapur has a separation population of Schedule Caste (SC) that constitutes 32.69% of total population. Aannapur currently does not have any Schedule Tribe (ST) peoples.

== Demographic ==
In the 2011 India census, Aannapur recorded a population of 1,343 in 201 registered households. Males constitute 53% of the population and females 47%.

== Transportation ==
The nearest major railway is the akbarpur Railway Station located 45 km from Aannapur. The Akbarpur Junction Railway Station is 45 km from Aannapur.

== Weather ==
Summer climates (March to July) range from 30 to 40 degrees Celsius. Winter climates (November to January) range from 10 to 20 degrees Celsius.

== See also ==
- List of villages in India
