= Musepur Kalan, Uttar Pradesh =

Musepur
- Village
- Location in Uttar Pradesh, India Musepur (India)
- Coordinates: 26.502°N 82.848°E
- Country: India
- State: Uttar Pradesh
- Tehsil: Alapur
- Division: Faizabad
- Elevation: 92 m (302 ft)

Languages
  - Official: Hindi, Urdu
- Time zone: UTC+5:30 (IST)
- Postal code: 224143
- Telephone code: 05273
- Vehicle registration: UP 45

Musepur is a village in Alapur tehsil of Ambedkar Nagar district, Uttar Pradesh state, India. It belongs to Faizabad Division. It is located 30 km east of the district headquarters, Akbarpur, Ambedkar Nagar, and 216 km from the state capital, Lucknow. Musepur Kalan's pin code is 224143, and its postal head office is Hanswar.

== Overview ==
Musepur Kalan Panchayat Ramnagar is situated in Ambedkar Nagar District. Agriculture is the main profession of this village. The local language is Hindi.

== See also ==
- Ambedkar Nagar
