= Katat =

- Village
- Location in Uttar Pradesh, India Katat (India)
- Coordinates: 26.26°N 82.42°E
- Country: India
- State: Uttar Pradesh
- District: Ambedkar Nagar
- Elevation: 89.564 m (293.85 ft)

Population (2001)
  - Total: 1,200

Languages
  - Official: Hindi
- Time zone: UTC+5:30 (IST)
- PIN: 224210
- Telephone code: 91 5271
- Vehicle registration: UP 45

Katat or Katant is a village (gram/ gaon) in Akbarpur tehsil of Ambedkar Nagar district of Uttar Pradesh, India, located 10.4 miles (16.7 km) in the east of Akbarpur town on Akbarpur-Azamgarh road. It is the part of seven gram sabha and associated with village panchayat, Mouja- Majisa and post office Rampur Rampatti, with 1,200 residents, which comes under the jurisdiction of Sammanpur police station.

== Society ==
Katat is home to different sections of Indian society. It is a village with traditional culture, which is transforming rapidly. The villagers are mostly peasants and workers.

== Schools ==
Katat has one primary school controlled by Government of Uttar Pradesh. The total strength of students in the school is hundred (academic year 2010-11). The closest government school-Savitribai Government Girls Intermediate College for secondary education is located in Kurki Bazar.

== Transport ==
Katat is indirectly connected with Akbarpur, the district headquarters of Ambedkar Nagar through bus and small transport vehicles. Commuters and villagers have to leave bus or small transport vehicles at Bariyawan (15.1 km east of district headquarters) and walk towards south (behind minor irrigation channel), pitch road headed to the village.

== Nearest places ==
- Rajesultanpur
- Baskhari
- Akbarpur
- Tanda

== Nearest Higher Education Institute ==
The institute for higher education, Ramabai Government Women Post Graduate College is located 12.2 km from west of Katat village towards district headquarters.

== Nearest Railway Station ==
The nearest Indian Railways Station is Akbarpur (ABP) with distance of 17.2 km and Malipur railway station (MLPR) towards south-west of village with distance of 18.91 km.

== Nearest Hospital ==
The district hospital Akbarpur has the facilities of caring patients through emergency services.
