= Ramnagar Mahuware =

Village in Uttar Pradesh, India

Coordinates: 26.450°N 82.901°E

Ramnagar, also spelled as Ramnagar Mahuware, is a town in Ambedkar Nagar district, Faizabad division, in the state of Uttar Pradesh, India. It is located on National Highway 233A between Tanda and Rajesultanpur. It is also near Hanswar.

Religions in Ramnagar, Alapur
Religion	Percent
Hindus	90%
Muslims	10%
Jains	0%
Others†	0%
Distribution of religions †Includes Sikhs (0%), Buddhists (<0%).

== Educations ==
- Pt. Ram Lakhan Shukla Rajkeey Post Graduate College Alapur

Mansoorganj

- Ramnagar, Alapur
- Sekhauliya
- Chaudharipur
- Nagdaha

== See also ==
Ambedkar Nagar district Top Kasba/Market

- Hanswar
- Tanda
- Akbarpur
- Rajesultanpur
- Jalalpur
- Baskhari
