= Mordhwaj =

King in Indian folklore

Mordhwaj Koliya vanshi
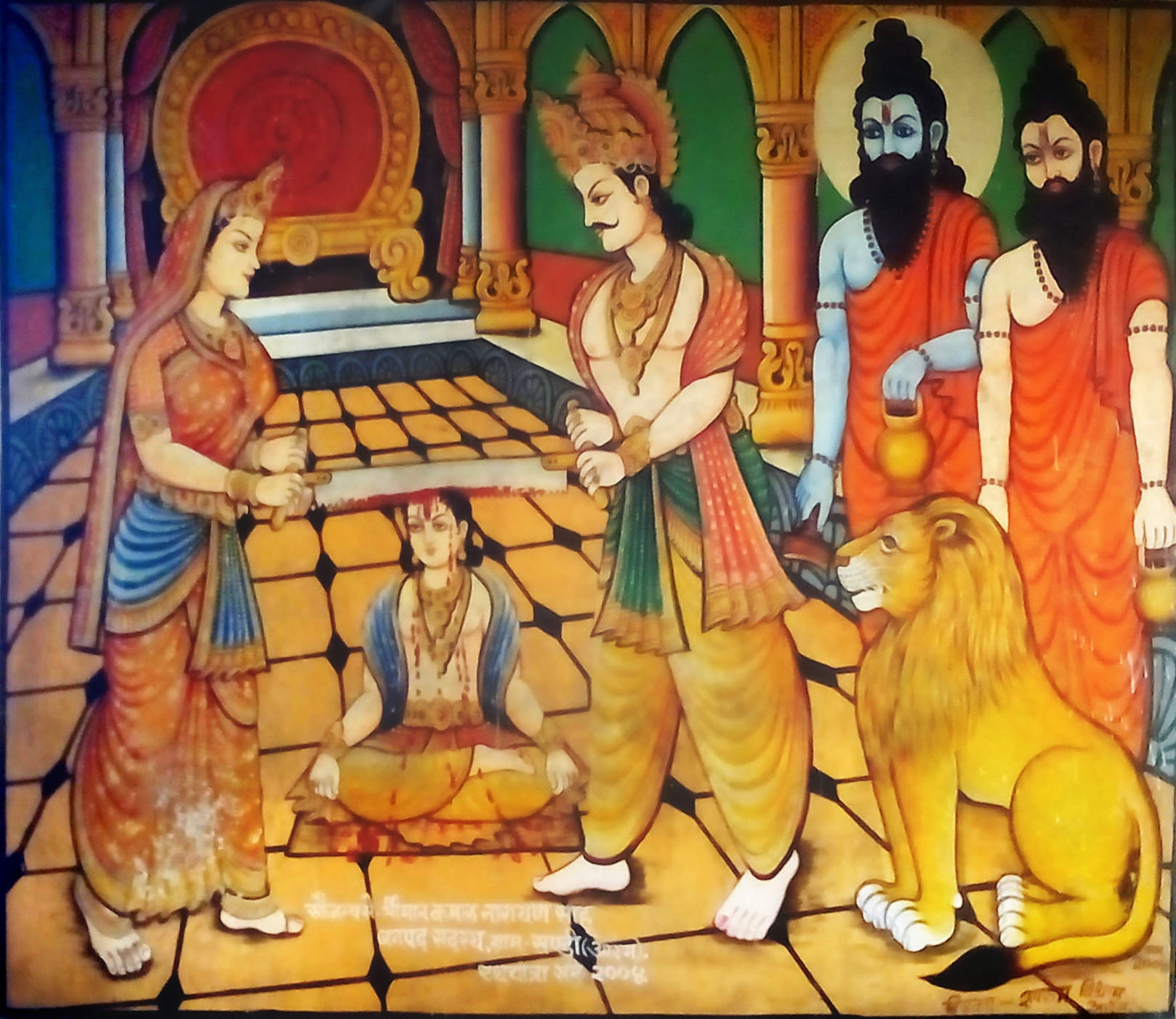
- Raja Mordhwaj and his wife cutting their son's body in front of Krishna and Balram as saints and Arjuna as Lion
- Based on: Mahabharata

In-universe information
- Full name: Raja Mordhwaj
- Gender: Male
- Occupation: King
- Family: Haihaya dynasty
- Spouse: Padmavati
- Children: Tamradhwaj

According to Indian folklore, Mordhwaj or Mordhwaja or Murddhawaja (Sanskrit: मोरध्वज) is an ancient king of the Mahabharata period, who is believed to have been blessed by Krishna.

== Legends ==
According to regional folklore, Mordhwaj was a devotee of Krishna and a great donor. Arjuna was proud that there is no greater devotee of Krishna than him. After Mahabharata War was over, Lord Krishna told Arjuna that I have a devotee greater than you and that is Mordhwaj. Krishna reached King Mordhwaj in a Brahmin disguise and said that Maharaj, my lion, is hungry and he is a cannibal. The king Mordhwaj said that if I would be his food, it will be my fortune. Krishna said that both of you, husband and wife, should cut off the head of your son and feed him meat. In the meantime, even a single tear comes out; then, the lion will not eat it. Thus the king Mordhwaj and his queen cut off their son's head and put it in front of the lion. Then Krishna blessed king Mordhwaj and his son was resurrected. Thus Krishna tested his devotee and Arjuna's pride was shattered.

== Temples ==
A new temple has also been built near the ancient fort on the bank of Saryu River in Aalapur tehsil of Ambedkar Nagar district of Uttar Pradesh. In the Temple - Idol of King Mordhwaja along with his wife and son can be seen in a special stance which portrays the story of King Mordhwaj. A large number of devotees reach here every Sunday for bathing and worship. Chadipur Fort has its own special identity in the adjoining districts including Ambedkar Nagar, Azamgarh and Gorakhpur. Sadhus and saints from far-flung areas keep reaching this holy ghat throughout the year for worship.

A temple dedicated to Mordhwaj is located in a village called Moonj in the Etawah district of Uttar Pradesh.

Mordhwaj established the Bageshwar Nath Shiv Temple at Arang in Raipur District of Chhattisgarh in the 11th century.

Mahamaya Mandir, a 1400 years old temple at Ratanpur in Bilaspur district was also built by King Mordhwaj. According to its priest Pandit Manoj Shukla, King Mordhwaj had built 36 forts in Chhattisgarh. After the construction of every fort, he used to build a temple of Mother Mahamaya. One of these temples is the Mahamaya temple located in Raipur, where Mother Mahamaya and Samleshwari Devi are viewed as Mahalaxmi.

== Forts ==
A Mordhwaj fort is located at Mathurapur Mor village in Najibabad of Uttar Pradesh. The excavations, carried out at Mathurapurmor's Mordhwaj fort, which is locally known as Begam Kothi, located 15 kilometers from Kotdwara towards Najibabad, discovered antiques including terracotta, gold coins, potsherds decorated bricks and copper.

A police station in Bijnor district is named after King Mordhwaj. On the Meerut-Pauri National Highway, Najibabad and Kotdwar used to be the fort of King Mordhwaj. Its remnants are still available. In May 2021, the land has been allocated to construct the police station in Samirpur village.

There is another Mordhwaj Fort located on the bank of Saryu River in Aalapur tehsil of Ambedkar Nagar district of Uttar Pradesh. It is believed in the region that the fort was established by King Mordhwaj in Chadipur Kala, situated at a distance of 10 yojanas from Ayodhya. The force of time has neglected this ancient site.

One more, There is another Mordhwaj Fort located on the bank of Narmada River in barwaha tehsil of khargone district of madhya pradesh. It is believed in the region that the fort was established by King Mordhwaj in mardana, situated at a distance of 105 km from indore. The force of time has neglected this ancient site.

== See also ==
- Tamluk Royal Family
