= Bhaupur, Ambedkar Nagar =

Bhaupur Village Bhaupur
- Village
- Location in Uttar Pradesh, India Bhaupur Village (India)
- Coordinates: 26.255°N 82.355°E
- Country: India
- State: Uttar Pradesh
- District: Ambedkar Nagar

Government
  - Body: Gram panchayat
- Elevation: 92.964 m (305.00 ft)

Population (2001)
  - Total: 1,750

Languages
  - Official: Hindi
- Time zone: UTC+5:30 (IST)
- PIN: 224210
- Telephone code: 91 5271
- Vehicle registration: UP 45

Bhaupur is a village (gram/ gaon) in Akbarpur, Ambedkar Nagar district of Uttar Pradesh, India, located 4.8 miles (7.7 km) in the east of Akbarpur town. It is the part of eleven gram sabha , with 1,750 people, which comes under the gram panchayat (local government), Rukunuddinpur.

== Society ==
Bhaupur is home to various sections of Indian society. It is a village with traditional culture, which is transforming slowly. The villagers are mostly peasants and workers.

== Schools ==
Bhaupur has one primary school controlled by Government of Uttar Pradesh. The total strength of students in the school is seventy-five (academic year 2009–10).

== Transport ==
Bhaupur is indirectly connected with Akbarpur, the district headquarters of Ambedkar Nagar through bus and small transport vehicles. Commuters and villagers have to leave bus or small transport vehicles at Kurki Bazar (4 km east of district headquarters) and walk towards south, pitch road headed to the village.

== Nearest places ==
- Rajesultanpur
- Baskhari
- Akbarpur
- Tanda

== Nearest Higher Education Institute ==
The institute for higher education, Ramabai Government Post Graduate College (for Women) is located 3.5 km from west of Bhaupur village towards district headquarters.

== Nearest railway station ==
The nearest Indian Railways Station is Akbarpur railway station (ABP) with distance of 8.5 km.

== Nearest hospital ==
The district hospital Akbarpur has the facilities of caring patients through emergency services.
