= Mundera =

- Village
- Location in Uttar Pradesh, India Mundera (India)
- Coordinates: 26.3153°N 79.81560°E
- Country: India
- State: Uttar Pradesh
- Division: Faizabad
- Tehsil: Baskhari
- Elevation: 92 m (302 ft)

Population (2011)
  - Total: 5,026
  - Density: 2/km^{2} (5.2/sq mi)

Languages
  - Official: Hindi Urdu English
- Time zone: UTC+5:30 (IST)
- Postal code: 224143
- Telephone code: +91-5450
- Vehicle registration: UP45 XXXX

Mundera is a Village of Tanda, Ambedkar Nagar, Uttar Pradesh. Mundera is Tehsil of Baskhari and belongs to Faizabad division. Mundera is administered by Akbarpur, which is 35 km away.

== Transportation ==
There is no railway station within 35 km of Mundera. However, the Akbarpur Junction Railway is 35 km away and a major station, the Basti Railway Station, is 60 km away.

== Demographics ==
As of 2011 India census Mundera had a population of 5,026. Males constitute 53% of the population and females 47%.There are 710 houses in Mundera.

== Weather ==
Mundera climate of summer (March to July) temperatures can range from 30 to 40 degrees Celsius. Winter climate (November to January) temperatures can range from 10 to 20 degrees Celsius.

== See also ==
- List of villages in India
