= Mahrajganj, Azamgarh =

Mahrajganj
- Town
- Location in Uttar Pradesh, India
- Coordinates: 26°16′N 83°07′E
- Country: India
- State: Uttar Pradesh
- District: Azamgarh

Population (2011)
  - Total: 6,735

Languages
  - Official: Hindi, Avadhi
- Time zone: UTC+5:30 (IST)
- Vehicle registration: UP 50

Maharajganj is a town and a nagar panchayat in Azamgarh district in the Indian state of Uttar Pradesh. It is connected to National Highway 233B (India), linking Azamgarh to Rajesultanpur.

== Demographics ==
Religions in Maharajganj, Azamgarh
Religion	Percent
Hindus	92%
Muslims	08%
Jains	0%
Others†	0%
Distribution of religions †Includes Sikhs (0.0%), Buddhists (<0.0%).

As of 2011 Maharajganj had a population of 6,735. Males constitute 51% of the population and females 49%. Maharajganj has an average literacy rate of 67.93%, higher than the national average of 64.8%. Male literacy is 73%, and female literacy is 62.4%. In Maharajganj, 14% of the population is under 6.

== Geography ==
Maharajganj is located within 6 km of Rajesultanpur and 24 km of Azamgarh. Maharajganj is situated on the southern side of the river Chhoti Saryu,

== Transport ==
National Highway 233B (India) connects Azamgarh, Rajesultanpur, Gorakhpur and Kaptanganj to Mahrajganj Overall Road Connectivity is good.
