= Bhiyaon =

Bhiyaon Bhiyawan
- Block
- Location in Uttar Pradesh, India
- Coordinates: 26.352°N 82.795°E
- Country: India
- State: Uttar Pradesh
- District: Ambedkar Nagar

Government
  - Body: Village

Area
  - Total: 211.86 km^{2} (81.80 sq mi)
- Elevation: 90 m (300 ft)

Population (2011)
  - Total: 208,260
  - Density: 983.01/km^{2} (2,546.0/sq mi)

Languages
  - Official: Hindi, Awadhi
- Time zone: UTC+5:30 (IST)
- PIN: 224139
- Telephone code: 05274
- Vehicle registration: UP45
- Website: ambedkarnagar.nic.in

Bhiyaon or Bhiyawan is a village block in Jalalpur, Ambedkar Nagar district of the Indian state of Uttar Pradesh. It belongs to Akbarpur Division (formerly Ayodhya Division). It is located 39 km east of the district headquarters, Akbarpur, and 230 km from Lucknow.

== Demographics ==
According to the 2011 census, Bhiyaon has a population of 208,260. The male population was 104,244, while females numbered 104,016. The sex ratio was 998. The average literacy rate was 70.52%, with males at 81.77% and females at 59.42%. 13% of the population is under six years of age.

== See also ==
- Ambedkar Nagar
- Akbarpur, Ambedkar Nagar
- Akbarpur Railway Station
- Akbarpur Airport
