= Sethwa =

Village in Uttar Pradesh, India

Coordinates: 25.808974°N 83.602314°E

Sethwa is a village situated near the town of Jalalpur, in the Ambedkar Nagar district of Uttar Pradesh, India. The name Sethwa originates from the amalgamation of Seth and Wa. The word seth in Hindi Language means A Wealthy Person and wa means To Live, so in effect it means a place where wealthy people live and it lives by this name.
