= Bachuwapar =

- Village
- Nickname: BPR
- Location in Uttar Pradesh, India Bachuwapar (India)
- Coordinates: 26°17′10″N 83°06′50″E
- Country: India
- State: Uttar Pradesh
- District: Ambedkar Nagar
- Subdistrict: Rajesultanpur
- Founder: 1801
- Named for: Pandit Rajesh Mishra
- Elevation: 1,346 m (4,416 ft)

Population (2011)
  - Total: 5,678

Languages
  - Official: Hindi, Awadhi, English
- Time zone: UTC+5:30 (IST)
- Pincode: 224176
- Vehicle registration: UP 45
- Sex ratio: 1165/1000 ♂/♀

Bachuwapar is a Kasba/Town in Ambedkar Nagar district in the Indian state of Uttar Pradesh and is Subpost Office of Rajesultanpur.

== Demographics ==
As of 2011 India census, Bachuwapar had a population of 578. Males constitute 54% of the population and females 46%. Bachuwapar has an average literacy rate of 70%, higher than the national average of 59.5%: male literacy is 76%, and female literacy is 63%. In Bachuwapar, 15% of the population is under 6 years of age.

Religions in Bachuwapar
Religion	Percent
Hindus	96%
Muslims	0%
Jains	4%
Others†	0%
Distribution of religions †Includes Sikhs (0%), Buddhists (<0%).

== Nearby City ==
- Rajesultanpur 0.5 km
- Tanda 50 km
- Azamgarh 30 km
- Gorakhpur 58 km
- Faizabad 120 km
