= National Highway 233 (India) =

Road in India

National Highway 233

Route information
- Length: 288 km (179 mi)

Major junctions
- West end: Varanasi, Uttar Pradesh
- East end: Lumbini, Nepal

Location
- Country: India
- Primary destinations: Lumbini, Siddharthnagar, Ambedkar Nagar, Azamgarh, Varanasi, Basti

Highway system
- Roads in India; Expressways; National; State; Asian
← NH 232	→ NH 233A

National Highway 233 is a National Highway in India that links Varanasi, Uttar Pradesh to Lumbini, Nepal via Azamgarh.

In February 2024, prime minister Narender Modi inaugurated the four-lane Ghargra-Bridge-Varanasi section of the NH 233.

== Route description ==
National Highway 233 starts at the Varanasi and runs to Tanda and Lumbini

- Varanasi
- Chandwak
- Lalganj
- Rani Ki Sarai
- Azamgarh
- Gomadih
- Burhanpur
- Atrauliya
- Baskhari
- Tanda
- Basti
- Rudhauli
- Bansi
- Siddharthnagar
- Birdpur
- Kakrahwan
- Lumbini

== See also ==
- List of national highways in India
- National Highways Development Project
