= Ghughurpatti =

Village in Uttar Pradesh, India

- village
- Location in Uttar Pradesh, India Ghughurpatti (India)
- Coordinates: 26°17′10″N 83°07′50″E
- Country: India
- State: Uttar Pradesh
- Established: 7
- Founder: 1801
- Named for: Pandey Firefired

Government
  - Type: Town Area
- Elevation: 156 m (512 ft)

Population (2011)
  - Total: 193

Languages
  - Official: Hindi
  - Additional official: Urdu
- Time zone: UTC+5:30 (IST)
- PIN: 224176
- Vehicle registration: UP 45
- Sex ratio: 1000/1040 ♂/♀

Ghughurpatti is a village in Ambedkar Nagar district in the Indian state of Uttar Pradesh and is a sub post office of Rajesultanpur.

== Demographics ==
As of 2011 Indian Census, Ghughurpatti had a total population of 193, of which 95 were males and 98 were females. Population within the age group of 0 to 6 years was 28. The total number of literates in Ghughurpatti was 131, which constituted 67.9% of the population with male literacy of 80.0% and female literacy of 56.1%. The effective literacy rate of 7+ population of Ghughurpatti was 79.4%, of which male literacy rate was 93.8% and female literacy rate was 65.5%. Ghughurpatti had 30 households in 2011.

Ghughurpatti' Village population is 198.

Religions in Ghughulpatti
Religion	Percent
Hindus	100%
Muslims	0%
Jains	0%
Others†	0%
Distribution of religions †Includes Sikhs (0%), Buddhists (<0%).

== Nearest city ==
- Rajesultanpur 2 km
- Maharajganj 2 km
- Tanda 52 km
- Azamgarh 28 km
- Gorakhpur 60 km
- Faizabad 122 km
