= Alauddin Patti =

Coordinates: 26°11′N 83°12′E

Alauddin Patti is a village in Azamgarh district of Uttar Pradesh, India. Its population is about 7000.

The nearest railway station is Azamgarh, and the nearest airport is Varanasi (100 km).

The nearest town is Bilariyaganj.

The nearest police station is Bilariyaganj.

The post office is Bilariyaganj.

There is one primary school and one higher secondary school.

The main industry in this village is farming.

The majority of young and average people have migrated to different parts of India and abroad for jobs.
