= Choti Saryu =

River in India

Choti Saryu or Tamasa River is a river in India that starts in Ambedkar Nagar, Faizabad division, Uttar Pradesh, and passes through Mau and joins another river in Phephna. The joint stream joins the Ganga at Anjorpur. It is a perennial river – in the dry season only sluggish black water remains, but in the rainy season it can cause floods such as the one in 2005.

It should not be confused with the Tamsa River which originates in the Kaimur Range in Madhya Pradesh and joins the Ganga at Sirsa.

== Route ==
1. Tanda
2. Baskhari
3. Neoriye
4. Atoliya
5. Rajesultanpur
6. Mahrajganj
7. Bilariyaganj
8. Latghat
9. Doharighat
10. Maduwan

== Towns and ghat ==
- Tanda (Rajghat, Nizamghat)
- Rajesultanpur (Kamhariyaghat, Baluaghat, Chadipurghat)
- Doharighat (Muktidham)
