= Bhaupur =

Bhaupur may refer to:

- Bhaupur, Kanpur
- Bhaupur, Ambedkar Nagar
