= Prithvipur, Ambedkar Nagar =

Prithvipur
- Village
- Location in Uttar Pradesh, India Prithvipur (India)
- Coordinates: 26.333°N 82.445°E
- Country: India
- State: Uttar Pradesh
- Division: Faizabad
- Tehsil: Baskhari
- Elevation: 89 m (292 ft)

Population (2011)
  - Total: 2,074
  - Density: 2/km^{2} (5.2/sq mi)

Languages
  - Official: Hindi Urdu English
- Time zone: UTC+5:30 (IST)
- Postal code: 224190
- Telephone code: +91-5450
- Vehicle registration: UP45 XXXX

Prithvipur is a village of Tanda, Ambedkar Nagar, Uttar Pradesh, India. It is also a Tehsil and forms part of Faizabad division. Akbarpur is the district headquarters and is 35 km (22 mi) distant. The postal code is 224190.

== Caste ==
The village has a separation population of Schedule Caste (SC) which constitutes 32.79% of total population. The village currently doesn't have any Schedule Tribe (ST) peoples.

== Demographics ==
As of the 2011 India census Prithvipur had a population of 2,074. Males constitute 53% of the population and females 47%. There are 352 houses in Prithvipur.

== Transportation ==
There are no railway stations less than 35 km away from Prithvipur. Basti Railway Station is a major railway station 50 km from Prithvipur.

== Weather ==
Prithvipur has a climate of summer (from March to July), and temperatures can range from 30 to 40 degrees Celsius. Winter climate (November to January) temperatures can range from 10 to 20 degrees Celsius.

== See also ==
- List of villages in India
