= Shravan Kshetra =

Shravan Kshetra is a Hindu pilgrimage centre in Akbarpur, Ambedkar Nagar District, Uttar Pradesh, India. It is located at the confluence of Tamsa and Visui rivers. According to local tradition, it is the place where Dasharatha, the father of Rama, killed Shravan.
