= Rashtriya Inter College =

Location
- Rajesultanpur, Uttar Pradesh; India; 26°18′N 83°07′E

Information
- Type: Public
- Established: 2001
- Principal: Rajbali Pandey
- Faculty: 15
- Enrollment: 2,456 (2014–2015) (974 undergrad, 11 postgrad)
- Campus: Rural, 1.809 acres
- Nickname: RIC
- Affiliations: Inter College

Rashtriya Inter College is an intermediate college located in Rajesultanpur, Uttar Pradesh. It was established in 1990 by the Government of India.

== Students ==
The college provides admission to female and male students after completion of 10+2 (intermediate) course work in different streams: Humanities, Science and Commerce. For the 2014–2015 academic year, the size of the student body is about 4,385, which comprised various sections of society.
