= Syeda Ummehani Ashraf =

Indian academic

- Born: 26 December 1949 (age 76); Kichaucha Sharif, Uttar Pradesh, India

Academic work
- Era: contemporary
- Discipline: Urdu language
- Institutions: Aligarh Muslim University

Religious life
- Religion: Islam
- Main interests: Urdu Qaseeda

Syeda Ummehani Ashraf is a senior Professor of Urdu at the Women's College of Aligarh Muslim University. She is the wife of Urdu poet and critic, Syed Amin Ashraf. She has authored books including A study of Classicism and Romanism in Urdu.

== Biography ==
Ummehani Ashraf was born to Syed Aale Hasan and Syeda Khatoon on 26 December 1949 at Kichaucha Sharif, Ambedkar Nagar District, Uttar Pradesh, India. She did her primary schooling at the village madrasa in Kichaucha Shariff. She cleared the matriculation examination as a private candidate in 1966. She received a B.A in 1973 an M.A in 1975, and a PhD degree in 1981 from the Aligarh Muslim University. Her PhD thesis title was Shumaili Hind ke Qasaid Ki Farhang.

She was appointed Urdu lecturer in the Women's College of the Aligarh Muslim University in 1986. She became a professor in 2002.

== Literary works ==
Ummehani Ashraf's works include:

- A study of Classicism and Romanism in Urdu
- Urdu Qaseeda Nigari
- Urdu Marsia Nigari
- A sociological study of Urdu Qaseeda
- A farhang of Urdu Qaseedas as written in North India
