= Chhihin Sharif =

- village
- Location in Uttar Pradesh, India
- Coordinates: 26.165033°N 83.245368°E
- Country: India
- State: Uttar Pradesh
- District: Azamgarh

Population (2011)
  - Total: 2,673

Languages
  - Official: Urdu
- Time zone: UTC+5:30 (IST)
- Postal code: 530003

Chhihin Sharif is a village near Bilariaganj in Azamgarh District of Uttar Pradesh state in India. It is located 12 km towards South from Azamgarh and is 262 km away from state capital Lucknow. Chhihin Sharif is part of Sagri tehsil of Azamgarh District. It has a population of 2,673, as per Population Census. Chhihin Sharif is known for its graveyard which is one of the biggest in Uttar Pradesh East. Bilariyaganj is the nearest town to this village. The adjoining villages are Mohammadpur and Chhichhori.

Urdu and Hindi is local dialect used in Chhihin Sharif. However, due to most of the youths getting educated, English is also becoming a language of daily use among youths.

== See also ==
- Bilariaganj
