= Bheem Prasad Sonkar =

Indian politician

MLA, 16th Legislative Assembly of Uttar Pradesh
- In office March 2012 – March 2017
- Preceded by: Constituency Created
- Succeeded by: Aneeta Kamal
- Constituency: Alapur

MLA, 13th Legislative Assembly of Uttar Pradesh
- In office 1996–2002
- Succeeded by: Mayawati
- Constituency: Jahangirganj

Personal details
- Born: 1 August 1956 Rajesultanpur, Uttar Pradesh
- Died: 23 February 2021 (aged 64) Azamgarh, Uttar Pradesh
- Citizenship: India
- Party: Samajwadi Party
- Spouse: Shakuntala Devi
- Children: 4
- Parent: Madhav Sonkar (father)
- Occupation: Agricultural
- Profession: Politician

Bheem Prasad Sonkar was an Indian politician and a member of the 16th Legislative Assembly of Uttar Pradesh of India. He represented the Alapur constituency of Uttar Pradesh and was a member of the Samajwadi Party. Sonkar died on 23 February 2021 while undergoing treatment at Azamgarh District Hospital. He was suffering from a fatal disease.

== Early life and education ==
Bheem Prasad Sonkar was born in Rajesultanpur, Uttar Pradesh. He held a Bachelor's degree.

== Political career ==
Bheem Prasad Sonkar has been a MLA for one term. He represented the Alapur constituency and was a member of the Samajwadi Party.

== Posts held ==
#	From	To	Position	Comments
01	March 2012	March 2017	Member, 16th Legislative Assembly	

== See also ==
- Alapur
- Rajesultanpur
- Politics of India
- Sixteenth Legislative Assembly of Uttar Pradesh
- Uttar Pradesh Legislative Assembly
