= Aneeta Kamal =

Indian politician

MLA in 17th Legislative Assembly of Uttar Pradesh
- In office March 2017 – March 2022
- Preceded by: Bheem Prasad Sonkar
- Constituency: Alapur (Assembly constituency)

Personal details
- Born: 23 March 1986 (age 40) Khatamipur, Ambedkar Nagar, Uttar Pradesh
- Party: Bharatiya Janata Party
- Education: Master of Arts
- Alma mater: Avadh University
- Occupation: MLA
- Profession: Politician; Agriculture

Aneeta Kamal is an Indian politician and a member of 17th Legislative Assembly of Uttar Pradesh of India. She represents the Alapur (Assembly constituency) in Ambedkar Nagar district of Uttar Pradesh and is a member of the Bharatiya Janata Party.

== Early life and education ==
Kamal was born 23 March 1986 in Khatamipur village in Ambedkar Nagar district of Uttar Pradesh to father Ram Parit. In 2006, she married Awadhesh Kumar, they have two sons. He belongs to Scheduled Caste (Chamar) community. In 2010, he attended Baba Barua Das Mahavidhyalaya Maruiya Ashram (Avadh University) and attained Master of Arts degree.

== Political career ==
Kamal has been MLA for one term. She was successful in the legislature in the first attempt. In 17th Legislative Assembly of Uttar Pradesh (2017) elections, she defeated Samajwadi Party candidate Sangeeta by a margin of 12,513 votes.

== Posts held ==
#	From	To	Position	Comments
01	March 2017	Incumbent	Member, 17th Legislative Assembly of Uttar Pradesh	
