= Aalapur =

- Town
- Location in Uttar Pradesh, India Aalapur (India)
- Coordinates: 26.333°N 82.445°E
- Country: India
- State: Uttar Pradesh
- Division: Faizabad (now Ayodhya division)
- District: Ambedkar Nagar
- Tehsil: Aalapur
- Elevation: 92 m (302 ft)
  - Rank: 240
  - Density: 2/km^{2} (5.2/sq mi)

Languages
  - Official: Hindi
- Time zone: UTC+5:30 (IST)
- Postal code: 224143
- Telephone code: +91-5450
- Vehicle registration: UP45 XXXX
- Website: http://ambedkarnagar.nic.in/TahseelSite/Alapur.html

Aalapur is a town and tehsil in Ambedkar Nagar district, Uttar Pradesh, India. It is a part of Faizabad division (now Ayodhya division) in Uttar Pradesh state. Aalapur is 33 km east of district headquarters Akbarpur city.

== Demographic ==
As of the 2011 India census, Aalapur had a population of 240. Males constituted 127 of the population and females 117. There were 34 households.

== Township ==
Alapur Subdivision have Only One Township in Rajesultanpur

== City/Town Area ==
1. Rajesultanpur
2. Jahangir Ganj

== Market ==
1. Ram Nagar
2. Sabitpur
3. Sukalbazzar
4. Padumpur
5. Siknghalpatti
6. Devriya Bazaar
7. Giryia Bazaar
8. Indaipur
9. Madarmau

== See also ==
- List of villages in India
