= Alapur Assembly constituency =

Assembly constituency in Uttar Pradesh

Coordinates: 27.91°N 79.24°E

Alapur
- Constituency No. 279 for the Uttar Pradesh Legislative Assembly

Constituency details
- Country: India
- Region: North India
- State: Uttar Pradesh
- District: Ambedkar Nagar
- Reservation: SC

Member of Legislative Assembly
- 18th Uttar Pradesh Legislative Assembly
- Incumbent Tribhuvan Dutt
- Party: Samajwadi Party
- Elected year: 2022
- Preceded by: Aneeta Kamal

Alapur is a constituency of the Uttar Pradesh Legislative Assembly covering the city of Alapur in the Ambedkar Nagar district of Uttar Pradesh, India. It is one of five assembly constituencies in the Sant Kabir Nagar Lok Sabha constituency. Since 2008, this assembly constituency is numbered 279 amongst 403 constituencies.

== Members of Legislative Assembly ==
Year	Member	Party
Till 2012 : Constituency did not exist See : Jahangirganj assembly constituency
2012	Bheem Prasad Sonkar	Samajwadi Party
2017	Aneeta Kamal	Bharatiya Janata Party
2022	Tribhuvan Dutt	Samajwadi Party

== Election results ==
=== 2027 ===
2027 Uttar Pradesh Legislative Assembly election: Alapur
Party	Candidate	Votes	%	±%
INDIA				
NDA				
BSP	Keshradevi Gautam			
NOTA	None of the above			
Majority				
Turnout				
gain from		Swing		

=== 2022 ===
2022 Uttar Pradesh Legislative Assembly election: Alapur
Party	Candidate	Votes	%	±%
SP	Tribhuvan Dutt	74,165	35.55	▲5.29
BJP	Triveni Ram	64,782	31.05	▼5.54
BSP	Keshradevi Gautam	53,061	25.43	▼4.19
VIP	Premlata	6,778	3.25	
NOTA	None of the above	1,538	0.74	▼0.26
Majority		9,383	4.5	▼1.83
Turnout		208,647	61.37	▲0.23
SP gain from BJP		Swing		

=== 2017 ===
Bharatiya Janta Party candidate Aneeta Kamal who won in last Assembly election of 2017 Uttar Pradesh Legislative Elections defeating Samajwadi Party candidate Sangeeta by a margin of 12,513 votes.

2017 General Elections: Alapur
Party	Candidate	Votes	%	±%
BJP	Aneeta Kamal	72,366	36.59	
SP	Sangeeta	59,853	30.26	
BSP	Tribhuvan Dutt	58,591	29.62	
NOTA	None of the above	1,949	1.0	
Majority		12,513	6.33	
Turnout		197,802	61.14	
BJP gain from SP		Swing		

=== 2012 ===
2012 General Elections: Alapur (SC)
Party	Candidate	Votes	%	±%
SP	Bheem Prasad Sonkar	79,846	48.15	
BSP	Tri Bhuvan Dutt	49,823	30.04	
INC	Jay Ram Vimal	11,587	6.99	
BJP	Triveni Ram	9,902	5.97	
PECP	Jaswant	3,927	2.37	
JPS	Anil Kumar	2,087	1.26	
	Remainder 9 Candidates	8,663	5.22	
Majority		30,023	18.10	
Turnout		1,65,835	58.28	
SP win (new seat)				
