= Sekhauliya, Uttar Pradesh =

Sekhauliya
- village
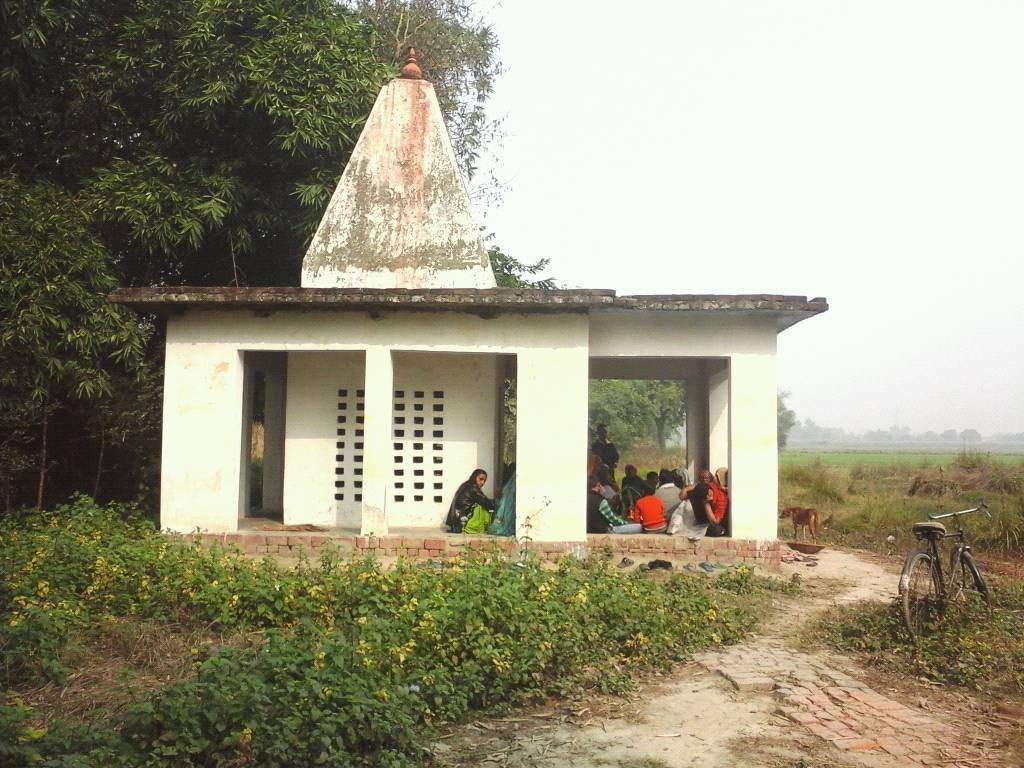
- Temple

- Location in Uttar Pradesh, India
- Coordinates: 26.4318519°N 82.917179°E
- Country: India
- District: Ambedkar Nagar district
- State: Uttar Pradesh
- Time zone: UTC+5:30 hours (IST)

Sekhauliya is the name of a village in Uttar Pradesh, ( Ayodhya division ) in the Ambedkar Nagar district . It is situated 2 km away from sub-district headquarter Alapur and 40 km away from district headquarter Ambedkar Nagar. As per 2009 stats, Madhuwana is the gram panchayat of Sekhauliya village. Another name of this village is Tapsi Nagar The same name is also written along with the polling station and school (172 Late Vidya Devi Kanya School Tapsi Nagar) The total geographical area of village is 48.14 hectares. Sekhauliya has a total population of 355 peoples. There are about 53 houses in Sekhauliya village.

== Nearby College ==
- Pt. Ram Lakhan Shukla Rajkeey Post Graduate College Alapur - This is under 5 km. of the east of village near Katghar.

== See also ==
- Ambedkar Nagar district
- Ramnagar, Alapur
- Ayodhya

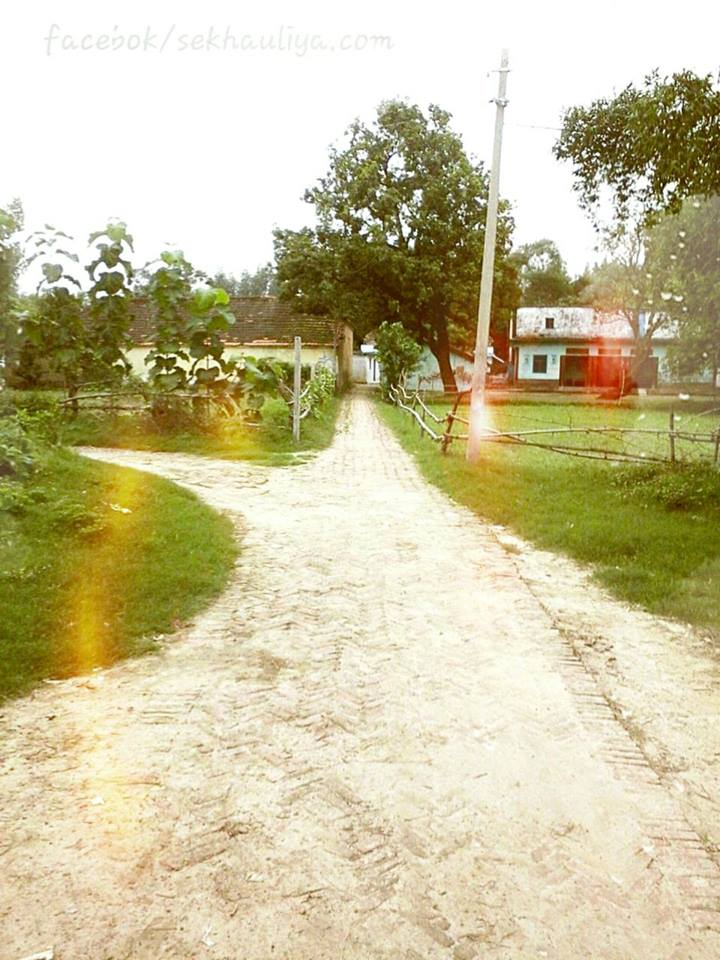
:An entrance path of Sekhauliya
