= Azmatgarh =

- town
- Location in Uttar Pradesh, India
- Coordinates: 26°09′58″N 83°22′01″E
- Country: India
- State: Uttar Pradesh
- District: Azamgarh
- Named for: Azmat Shah

Area
  - Total: 122 km^{2} (47 sq mi)

Population (2016)
  - Total: 23,483
  - Density: 536/km^{2} (1,390/sq mi)

Languages
  - Official: Hindi Bhojpuri
- Time zone: UTC+5:30 (IST)
- PIN: 276124
- Area code: 05462
- Vehicle registration: UP 50

Azmatgarh is a town and a nagar panchayat in Azamgarh district in the state of Uttar Pradesh, India.

== Schools in Azmatgarh ==
Children Public School is situated near Goga Bhikhi Chowk Azmatgarh. Children Public School was established in 2000.The school run in both English Medium (CBSE Board) as well as Hindi Medium (UP Board). It is an English Medium Co-Educational Institute.

== Festivals ==
Common Indian Festivals such as ChristmasHoli, Diwali, Durga Puja, Vijayadashami, Ram Navami, Eid are celebrated with great pomp and show in the city.

== Demographics ==
Azmatgarh is situated near jiyanpur, It is 4 kilometer east to jiyanpur, & 22.4 km from district headquarter Azamgarh

As of 2001 India census, Azmatgarh had a population of 18,101, but as per the UP government website, Azmatgarh had a population of 23,483. Males constitute 50% of the population and females 50%. Azmatgarh has an average literacy rate of 72%, lower than the national average of 75.5%; with 85% of the males and 70% of females literate. 21% of the population is under 6 years of age.

Religions in Azmatgarh
Religion	Percent
Hindus	76%
Muslims	23%
Jains	0.5%
Others†	0.5%
Distribution of religions †Includes Sikhs (0.2%), Buddhists (<0.2%).
