= Rajesharyarpur =

- Town
- Nickname: SP
- Location in Uttar Pradesh, India
- Coordinates: 26°18′17″N 83°05′44″E
- Country: India
- State: Uttar Pradesh
- Elevation: 100 m (330 ft)

Population (2011)
  - Total: 7,678

Languages
  - Official: Hindi, Awadhi, English
- Time zone: UTC+5:30 (IST)
- PIN: 224176
- Vehicle registration: UP 45

Rajesharyarpur or Sharyarpur, is a town in Ambedkar Nagar district in the Indian state of Uttar Pradesh. Rajesharyarpur is 1 km from Rajesultanpur city.

Religions in Raje Sharyarpur
Religion	Percent
Hindus	80%
Muslims	15%
Jains	5%
Others†	0.0%
Distribution of religions †Includes Sikhs (0.0%), Buddhists (<0.0%).
