= Gandhi Smarak Inter College, Rajesultanpur =

Gandhi Smarak Inter College
- गॉधी स्मारक इण्टर कालेज

Location
- Rajesultanpur, Uttar Pradesh; India
- Coordinates: 26°18′N 83°07′E

Information
- Type: Public
- Motto: Sanskrit: विजयते भारतम्
- Established: 1935
- Principal: Jaiprakash Singh
- Faculty: 45
- Enrollment: 4,456 (2014–2015) (974 undergrad, 411 postgrad)
- Campus: Rural, 9.809 acres
- Nickname: GSIC
- Affiliations: Inter College

Gandhi Smarak Inter College (Gandhi Memorial Inter College, Hindi: गॉधी स्मारक इण्टर कालेज,राजेसुल्तानपुर) is an intermediate college located in Rajesultanpur, Uttar Pradesh. It was established in 1932 by the Government of India.

== Students ==
The college provides admission to female and male students after completion of 10+2 (intermediate) course work in different streams: Humanities, Science and Commerce. For the 2014–2015 academic year, the size of the student body is about 4,385, which comprised various sections of society.
