= Mijhaura =

- village
- Location in Uttar Pradesh, India
- Coordinates: 26.85°N 80.92°E
- Country: India
- State: Uttar Pradesh
- District: Ambedkar Nagar

Government
  - Type: Pardhan RAJAN KHAN
  - Body: Gram panchayat

Population (2016)
  - Total: 18,000

Languages
  - Official: Hindi, Urdu avadhi
- Time zone: UTC+5:30 (IST)
- PIN: 224152
- Telephone code: 05271
- Vehicle registration: UP-45

Mijhaura is a village and a gram panchayat in Ambedkar Nagar district in the Indian state of Uttar Pradesh.
