= Tribhuvan Dutt =

Indian politician

Tribhuvan Dutt is an Indian politician from the Samajwaadi Party, before October 2020 he was member of Bahujan Samaj Party and a member of the 13th Lok Sabha from the Akbarpur constituency. In the 1999 Indian general election, the seat was won by Mayawati, but she resigned in 2002 to take over as Chief Minister of Uttar Pradesh. It went to Tribhuvan Dutt in the ensuing re-election.

Dutt also served on the Defence subcommittee of the 13th Lok Sabha.Digital Sansad

He won 2007 UP assembly election from Jahangirganj Assembly constituency of Ambedkarnagar.

Dutt joined Samajwaadi Party in October 2020. He won 2022 UP assembly election from Aalapur Seat of Ambedkarnagar.
