= National Highway 233A (India, old numbering) =

National highway in India

National Highway 233A

Route information
- Length: 100 km (62 mi)

Major junctions
- West end: Rajesultanpur, Uttar Pradesh
- East end: Ayodhya, Uttar Pradesh

Location
- Country: India
- Primary destinations: Rajesultanpur – Tanda- Ayodhya

Highway system
- Roads in India; Expressways; National; State; Asian
| ← NH 233 | → NH 233B |

National Highway 233A is a National Highway in India that links Rajesultanpur, Nasirpur, Chhitauna, Gangasagar, Ambedkar Nagar in Uttar Pradesh to Ayodhya in Uttar Pradesh.up

== Start ==
National Highway 233A starts in Ayodhya outed in Near NH 27(Ayodhya to Gorkhapur). Formally We are know Ayodhya in Deokali Chowk

== Route ==
- Ayodhya(Ring Road To Saketpuri)
- Devkali
- Darshan Nagar
- Maya Bazzar
- Iltifatganj Bazar
- Aropur
- Ramnagar, Alapur
- Jahangirganj(Mampur to Nahar road)Road)
- Deoria
- Pooranpur
- Tenduvaikalan
- Padumpur
- Rajesultanpur(Near Gopalbaag Chowk in NH233B )

== See also ==
- List of national highways in India
- National Highways Development Project
