= Arunima Sinha =

Indian mountain climber and sportswoman

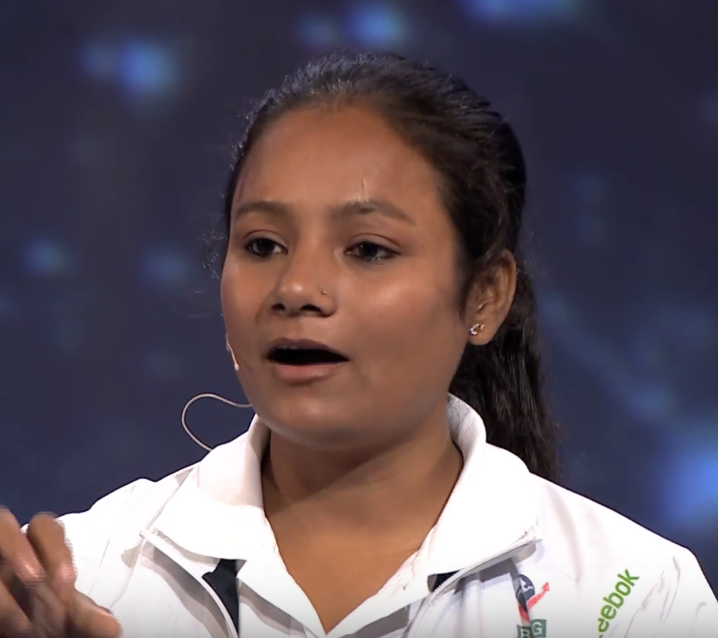
- Arunima Sinha in 2014
- Born: Ambedkar Nagar, Uttar Pradesh, India
- Occupations: Motivational Speaker; Indian Mountaineer; Former seven Time Volleyball national player
- Spouse: Gaurav Singh
- Awards: Padma Shri Award (2015); Tenzing Norgay National Adventure Award (2015); First Lady Award (2016); Malala Award; Yash Bharti Award; Rani Laxmi Bai Award

Arunima Sinha is an Indian mountaineer and sportswoman. She is India's first amputee and world's first female amputee to scale Mount Everest (Asia), Kilimanjaro (Africa), Mount Elbrus (Europe), Mount Kosciuszko (Australia), Aconcagua (South America), Denali (North America) and Vinson Massif (Antarctica). She is also a seven time Indian volleyball player. Before Arunima, Rhonda Graham from USA claimed to be the world's first female amputee who climbed Mount Everest in October 2011. However, reports stated that she climbed only up to the base camp.

She was pushed from a running train by robbers in 2011 while she was resisting them, causing in rods pushed into her left leg and multiple fractures of the spinal cord.

Her aim was to climb each of the continent's highest peaks and hoist the national flag of India. She had already done six peaks until 2014: Everest in Asia, Kilimanjaro in Africa, Elbrus in Europe, Kosciuszko in Australia, Aconcagua in South America, and Denali in North America. She completed her final summit of Mount Vinson in Antarctica on 1 January 2019.

In 2015, she received the Padma Shri award, the fourth highest civilian award of India.

== Early life ==
Arunima Sinha was born in Ambedkar Nagar near Lucknow in Uttar Pradesh. Her father was in the Indian Army and her mother was a supervisor in the health department. She has an elder sister and a younger brother. After her father died, her mother tried to take care of her family.

Arunima liked football and also was a national volleyball player. She wanted to join the paramilitary forces. She got a call letter from the CISF and faced a life-changing assault while travelling to Delhi. Robbers snatched her bag and pushed her out of the running train. She fell on the track and was unable to move due to her severe injuries. A train coming from the opposite side ran over her leg below the knee. She lay there through the night with 49 trains passing by. Locals took her to the hospital the following day.

== Train incident ==
Sinha, a former national volleyball and football player, boarded the Padmavati Express train at Lucknow for Delhi on 12 April 2011, to take an examination to join the CISF. She was pushed out of a general coach of the train by hooligans wanting to snatch her bag and gold chain. Recounting the incident, she said:

I resisted and they pushed me out of the train. I could not move. I remember seeing a train coming towards me. I tried getting up. By then, the train had run over my leg. I don't remember anything after that.

Immediately, as she fell on the railway track, another train on a parallel track crushed her leg below the knee. She was rushed to the hospital with serious leg and pelvic injuries and lost her leg after doctors amputated it to save her life.

She was offered compensation of ₹25,000 (US$260) by the Indian Sports Ministry. Following national outrage, The Minister of State for Youth Affairs and Sports, Ajay Maken announced an additional Rs. ₹200,000 (US$2,100) compensation as medical relief, together with a recommendation for a job in the CISF. The Indian Railways also offered her a job.

On 18 April 2011, she was brought to the All India Institute of Medical Sciences for further treatment, spending four months at the institute. She was provided a prosthetic leg free of cost by a private Delhi-based Indian company.

An inquiry by the police into the incident threw her version of the accident into doubt. According to the police, she was either attempting suicide or met with an accident while crossing the railway tracks. Arunima claimed that the police were lying. Contrary to the police claims the Lucknow bench of Allahabad High Court ordered Indian Railways to pay a compensation of ₹500,000 (US$5,200) to Arunima Sinha.

== Mount Everest journey ==
=== Planning and training ===
While still being treated in the All India Institute of Medical Sciences, she resolved to climb Mount Everest. She was inspired by cricketer Yuvraj Singh (who had recovered from cancer) and other television shows, "to do something" with her life. She excelled in the basic mountaineering course from the Nehru Institute of Mountaineering, Uttarkashi, and was encouraged by her mother to climb Everest. She climbed Mount Everest with a prosthetic leg, which was arranged by raising funds with the help of a swami of Ramakrishna Mission, Vadodara.

She contacted Bachendri Pal, the first Indian woman to climb Mount Everest, in 2011. When she met Pal and Arunima told her story to her, Bachendri Pal said to Arunima "My child, you decided to climb Mount Everest in these situations with Prosthetic (Artificial) leg. You had climbed, achieved Mount Everest my child now just the date is remaining to the World to know".

And after that Arunima joined a basic mountaineering course from Nehru Institute of Mountaineering and TATA Steel Adventure (TSAF) in Uttarkashi (India) and she was encouraged or motivated by her elder brother Omprakash to climb Mount Everest.

Sinha climbed Island Peak (6150 metres) in 2012 as preparation for her ascent of Everest

Sinha and Susan Mahout, a USAF instructor, who had together climbed Mount Chaser Sangria (6,622 meters or 21,726 feet) in 2012 under the guidance of Hendrick Pal started their ascent of Mount Everest.

After a hard toil of 17 hours, Sinha reached the summit of Mount Everest at 10:55 am on 21 May 2013, as part of the Tata Group-sponsored Eco Everest Expedition, becoming the first female amputee to scale Everest. She took 52 days to reach the summit. She wrote a small message thanking the Almighty on a wrapped cloth and pressed it in the snow. Recounting the incident, she said:

It was my tribute to Shankara Bhagawan, and Swami Vivekananda who has been an inspiration throughout my life.

=== After climbing Mount Everest ===
Uttar Pradesh then-incumbent chief minister Akhilesh Yadav honoured Sinha and handed over two cheques for an amount of Rs. 25 lakh in a function organised at her residence in Lucknow. This included a cheque of Rs. 20 lakh from the state government and a cheque of Rs. 5 lakh on behalf of Samajwadi Party. The chief minister said that Sinha had created history, due to her hard work and determination, by climbing Mount Everest. She was congratulated by the Jitendra Singh on her achievement.

Arunima Sinha is now dedicated towards social welfare and wants to open a free sports academy for poor and disabled people. She is donating all the financial aids she is getting through awards and seminars for the same cause. The academy would be named Shaheed Chandra Shekhar Vikalang Khel Academy.

She wrote the book titled Born Again on The Mountain: The Story of Losing Everything and Finding it back. in 2014.

She was awarded Padma Shri, the fourth highest civilian award of India, in 2015. She was Awarded Tenzing Norgay Highest Mountaineering Award in India same as Arjun Award.

== Antarctic expedition ==
After climbing the Mount Everest Arunima Sinha's next goal was to climb all the seven highest peaks in all seven continents. She covered six peaks, i.e. in Asia, Europe, South America, Australia, Africa and North America by 2014. She summited Mount Elburs of Russia (Europe) Elevation 5,642 m (18,510 ft), Prominence 4,741 m (15,554 ft) and Kilimanjaro of Tanzania (Africa) Elevation 5,895 m (19,341 ft) and Prominence 5,885 m (19,308 ft). On 4 January 2019, she climbed the seventh peak on Antarctica and became world's first female amputee to climb Mount Vinson.

== See also ==
- List of Mount Everest records of India
- List of Mount Everest records
- List of Mount Everest summiters by number of times to the summit
