= Anwar Jalalpuri =

Indian poet and translator (1947-2018)

Professor Anwar Jalalpuri
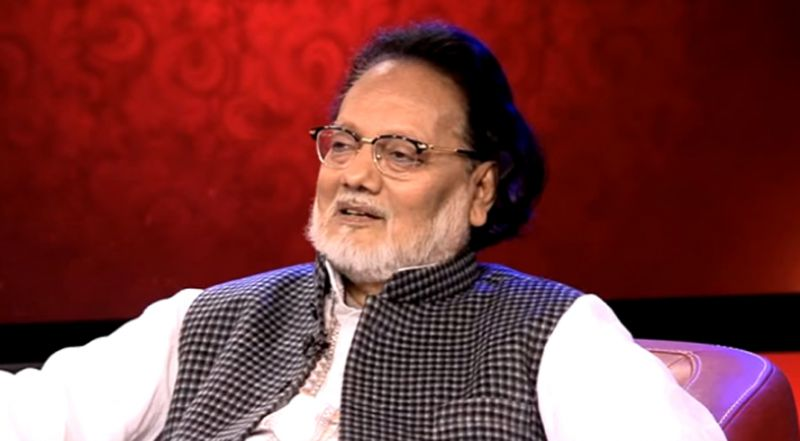
- Born: Anwar Ahmad; 6 July 1947; Jalalpur, United Provinces, British India
- Died: 2 January 2018 (aged 70); Lucknow, Uttar Pradesh, India
- Other name: Anwar Ahmad
- Education: Aligarh Muslim University
- Occupation: Poet
- Known for: Having translated the Bhagavad Gita from Sanskrit to Urdu
- Title: Professor, Poet
- Spouse: Aalima Khatoon
- Children: 4
- Awards: Yash Bharti Award (2016); Padma Shri (2018)

Anwar Jalalpuri (6 July 1947 – 2 January 2018) was an Indian Urdu poet from Jalalpur, Uttar Pradesh, known for translating the Bhagavad Gita from Sanskrit to Urdu.

Initially educated in Azamgarh, he studied at Aligarh Muslim University.

He received the Padma Shri posthumously from the President of India, and the Yash Bharti Award from the government of Uttar Pradesh. He also got Maati Ratan Samman by Shaheed Shodha Sansthan.

He died from a brain stroke on 2 January 2018.
