= Jahangirganj =

- Village
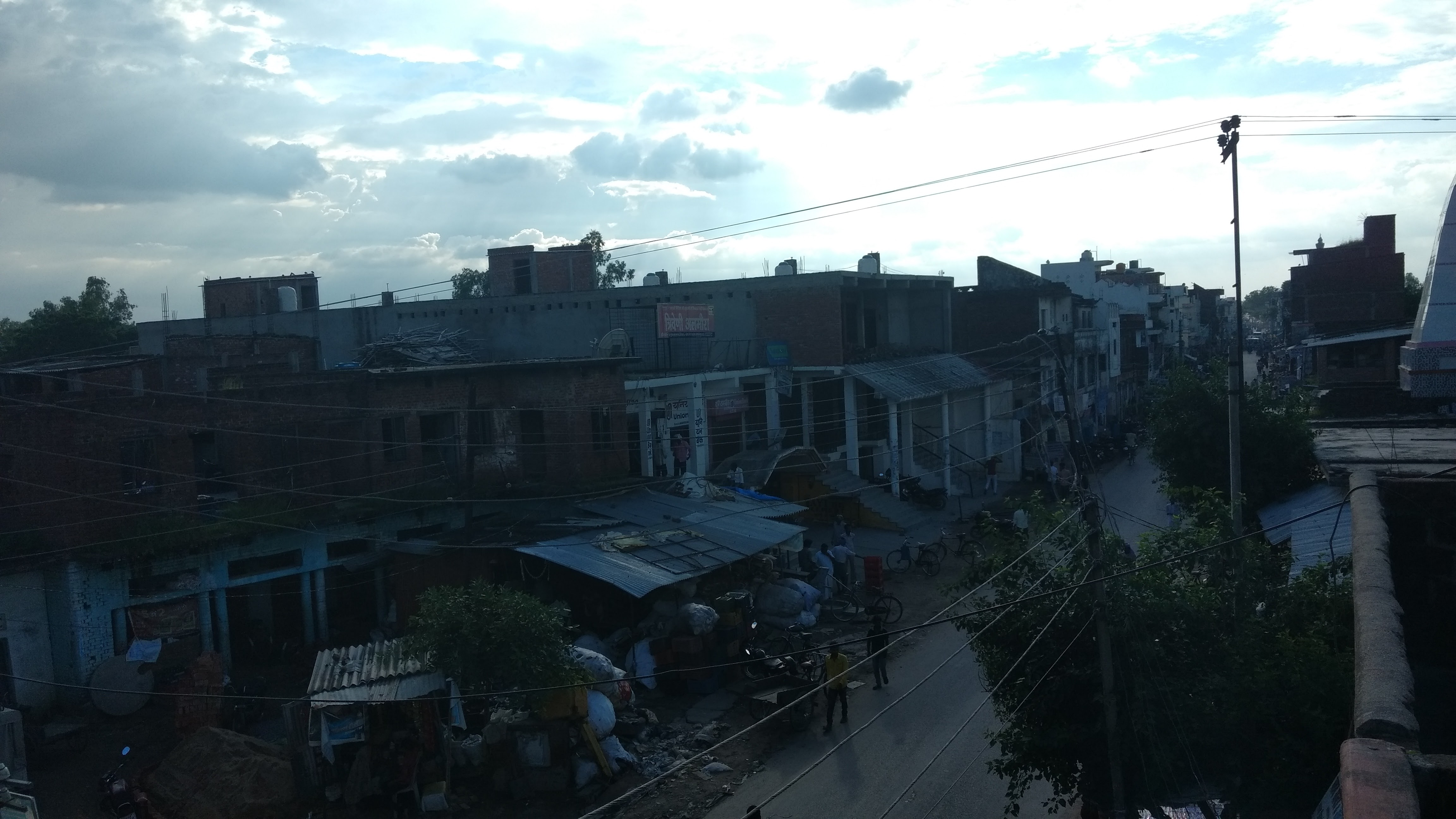
- Jahangirganj Market Long View in Rajesultanpur Tanda Road

- Location in Uttar Pradesh, India
- Coordinates: 26.4140705°N 82.978394°E
- Country: India
- State: Uttar Pradesh
- Elevation: 92 m (302 ft)

Population (2011)
  - Total: 4,773

Languages
  - Official: Hindi, Urdu
- Time zone: UTC+5:30 (IST)
- PIN: 224147
- Area code: 05274
- Vehicle registration: UP 45

Jahangirganj is a Nagar panchayat and Market in Ambedkar Nagar district in the Indian state of Uttar Pradesh and is Subpost Office. It is found 45 km towards East from District headquarters Akbarpur, Ambedkar Nagar and 242 km from State capital Lucknow.

== Demographics ==
As of 2011 Indian Census, Jahangirganj had a total population of 4,773, of which 2,406 were males and 2,367 were females. Population within the age group of 0 to 6 years was 636.

== Road ==
Jahangirganj is a counted by National Highway 233A (India) is going Tanda To Rajesultanpur and Azamgarh.

== Ecology ==
The highest day temperature during the summer is in between 26°C to 46°C and average temperatures of January is 16°C, February is 18°C, March is 26°C, April is 32°C and May is 37°C.

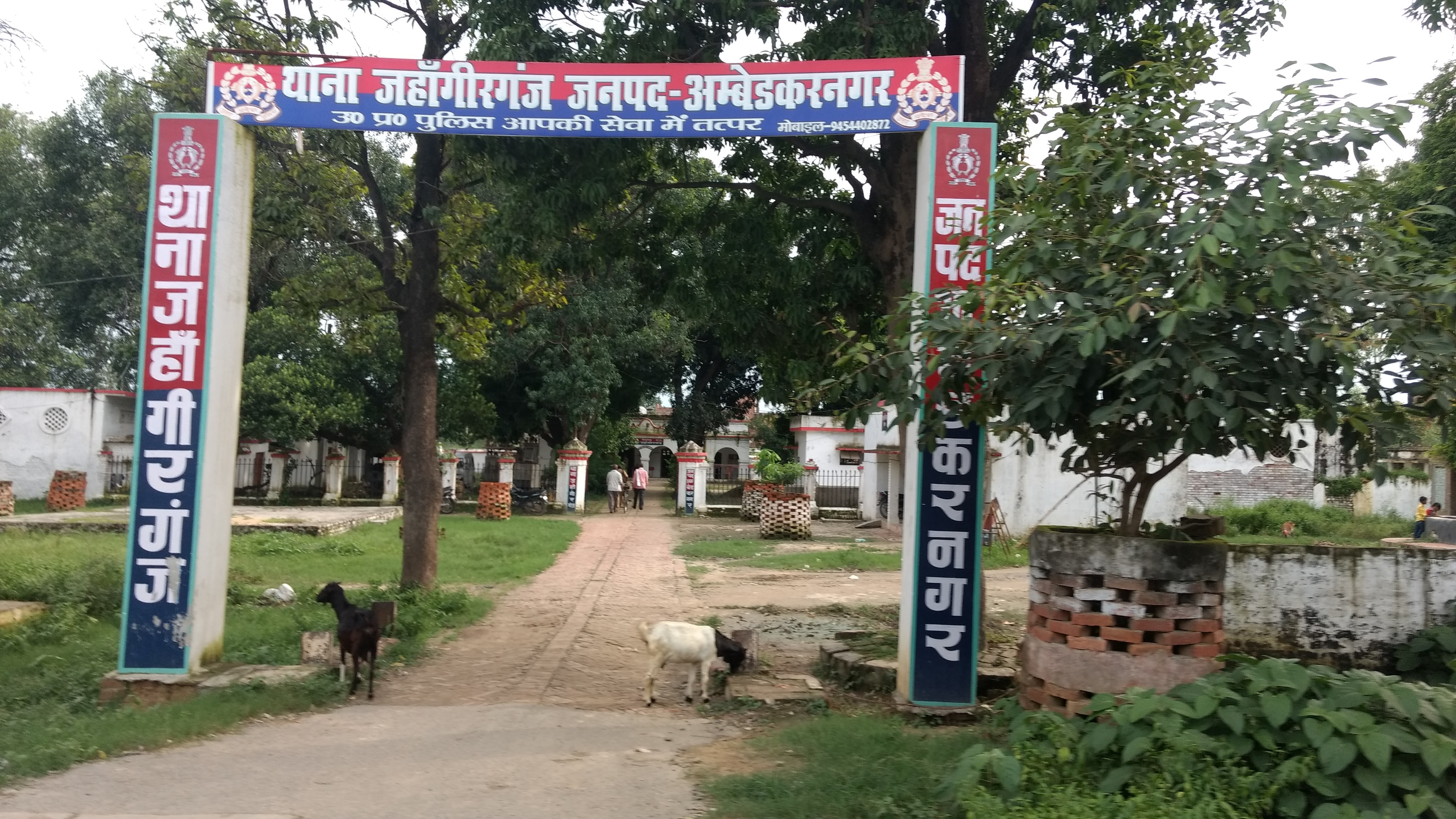
Jahangirganj Police Station in Tanda Rajesultanpur Road

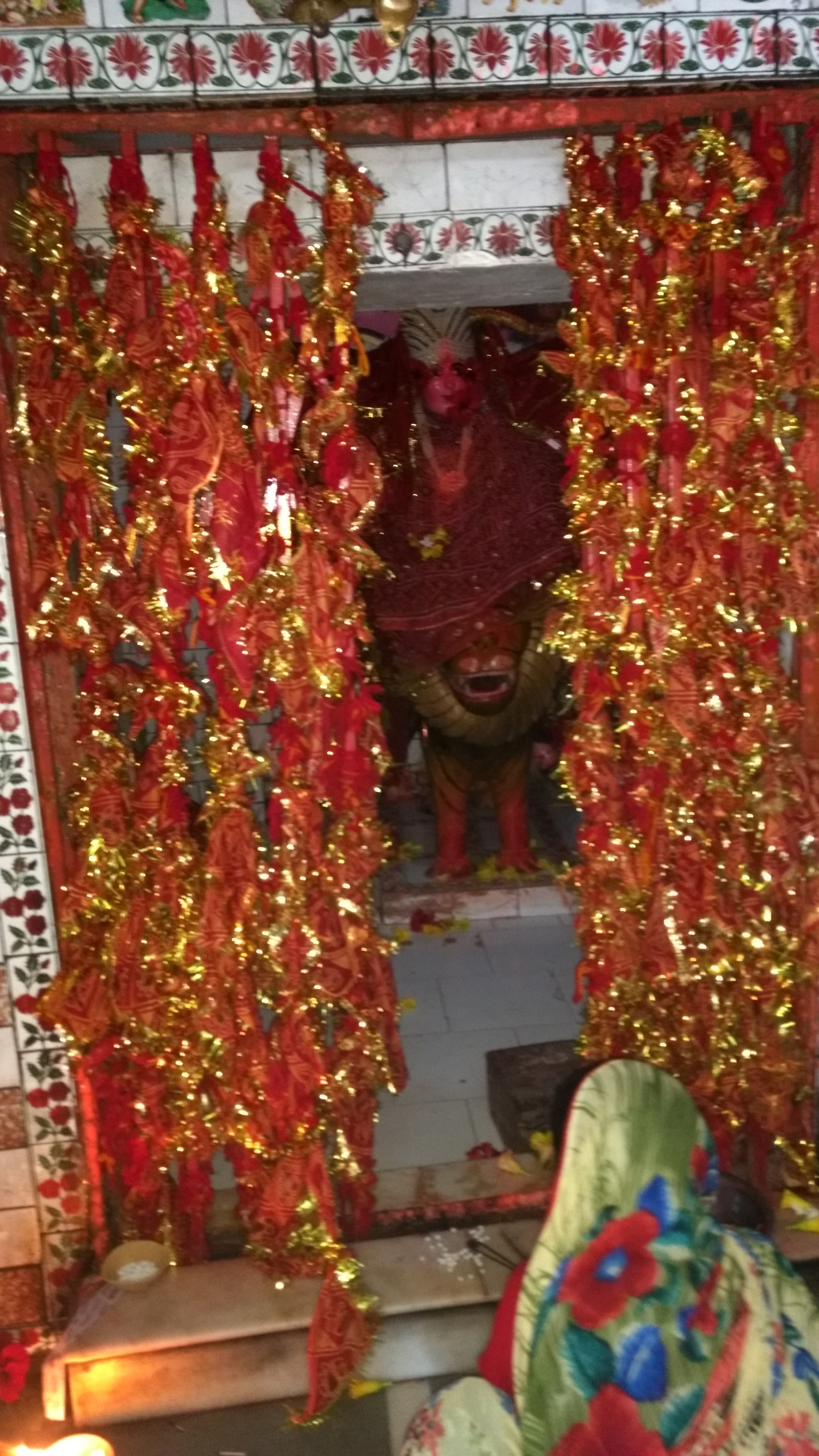
Bhujahiya Mata Temple near Jahangirganj

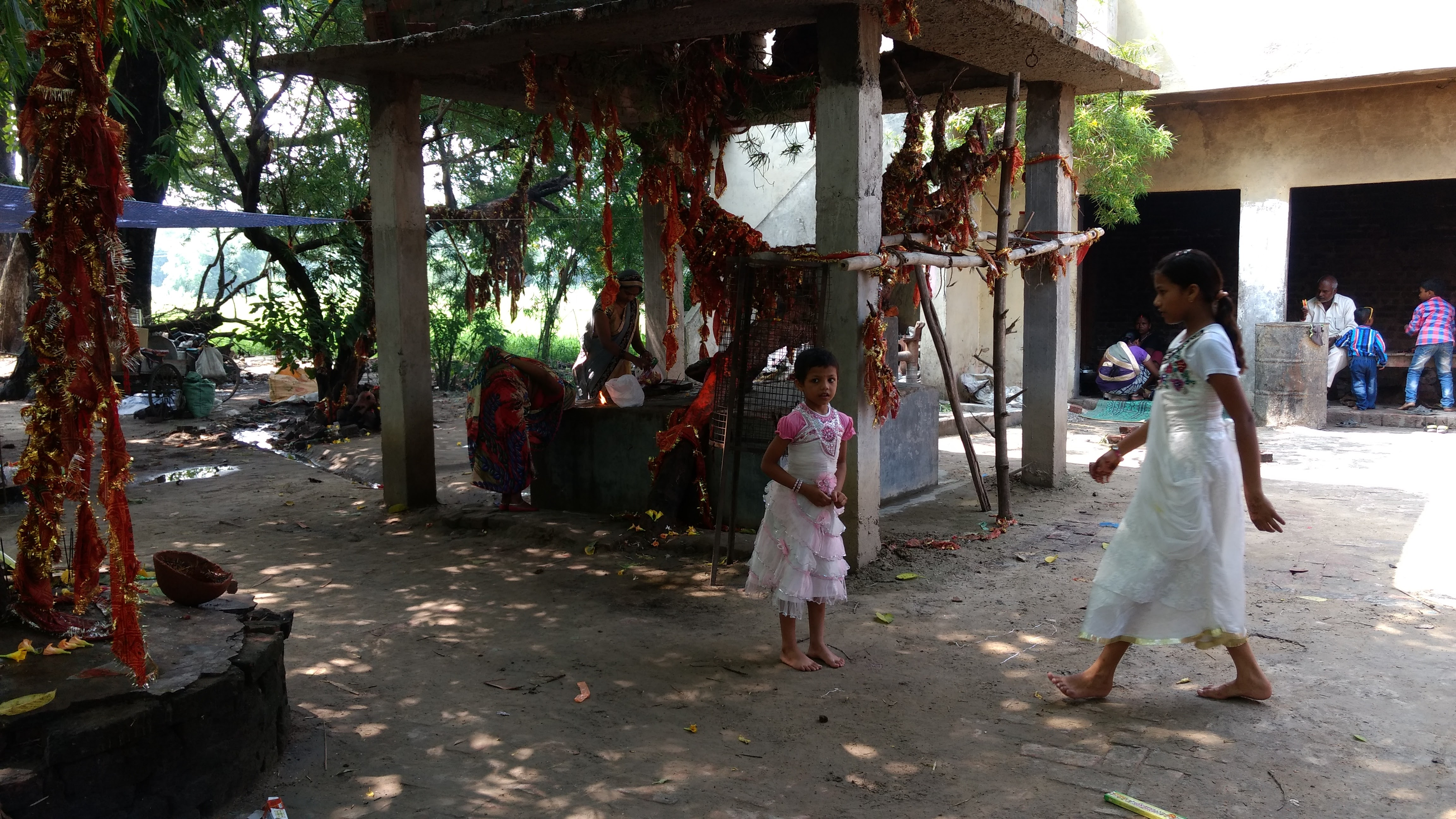
Holy Tree inside the Bhujahiya Mata Temple

== Nearly cities ==
- Tanda, Ambedkar Nagar 35 km
- Akbarpur 45 km
- Azamgarh 43 km
- Gorakhpur 70 km
- Khalilabad 47 km
- Rajesultanpur 20 km

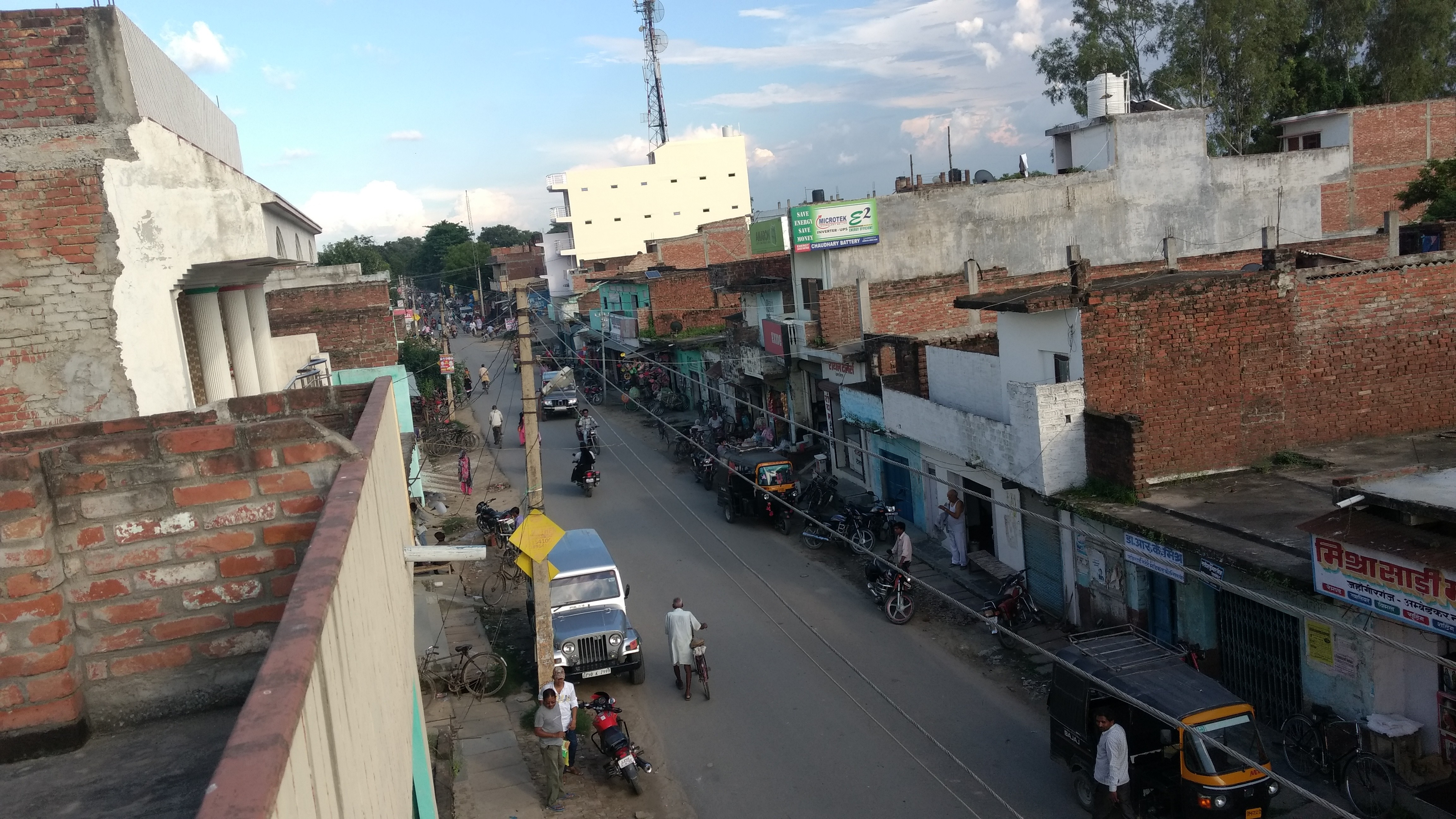
Jahangirganj Market view

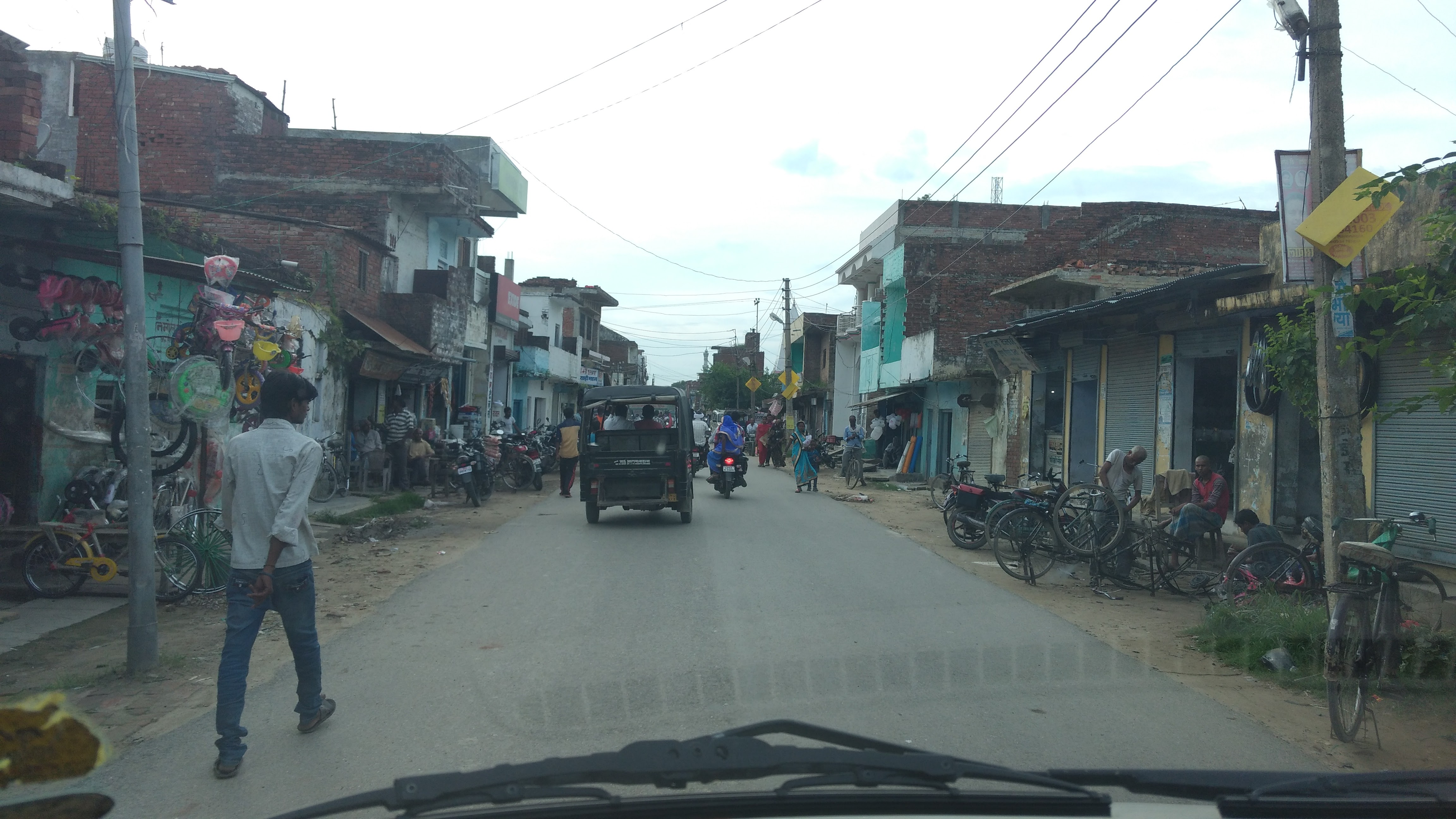
Jahangirganj Market
