= Iltifatganj Bazar =

- Town
- Location in Uttar Pradesh, India
- Coordinates: 26.54999°N 82.650018°E
- Country: India
- State: Uttar Pradesh
- District: Ambedaker Nagar

Government
  - Body: Municipal Board

Population (2001)
  - Total: 11,339

Languages
  - Official: Hindi
- Time zone: UTC+5:30 (IST)

Iltifatganj Bazar is a town and a nagar panchayat in Ambedaker Nagar district in the Indian state of Uttar Pradesh. Situated at the bank of Ghaghra River. It is near 4 km to Tanda NTPC township.

== Demographics ==
As of 2017 India census, Iltifatganj Bazar had a population of 11,339. Males constitute 52% of the population and females 48%. Iltifatganj Bazar has an average literacy rate of 55%, lower than the national average of 59.5%: male literacy is 60%, and female literacy is 49%. In Iltifatganj Bazar, 20% of the population is under 6 years of age.

Religions in Iltifatganj Bazzar
Religion	Percent
Hindus	29%
Muslims	71%
Jains	0.5%
Others†	0.5%
Distribution of religions †Includes Sikhs (0.2%), Buddhists (<0.2%).
