= Allapur, Uttar Pradesh =

Allapur
- Town
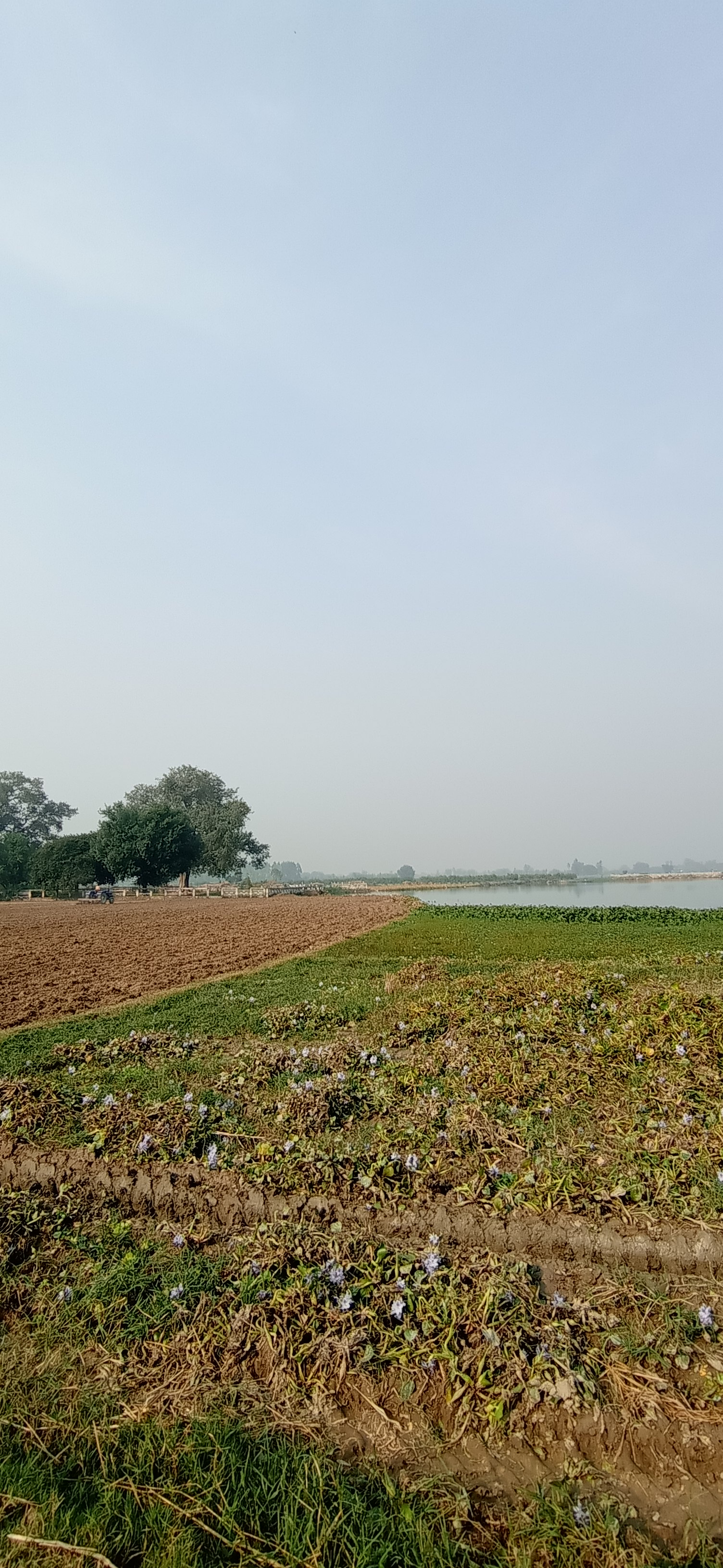
- Interactive map of Allapur
- Coordinates: 27.9120200°N 79.2379300°E
- Country: India
- State: Uttar Pradesh
- District: Badaun
- Founder: Alauddin Khilji

Population (2011)
  - Total: 23,985

Languages
  - Official: Hindi Urdu
- Time zone: UTC+5:30 (IST)
- Postal code: 243631
- Vehicle registration: UP- 24
- Website: up.gov.in

Allapur is a town and a nagar panchayat in Badaun district in the state of Uttar Pradesh, India.

== Demographics ==
As of the 2001 Census of India, Alapur had a population of 20,725. Males constitute 53% of the population and females 47%. Allapur has an average literacy rate of 35%, lower than the national average of 59.5%; with 67% of the males and 33% of females literate. 21% of the population is under 6 years of age.
