= Jiyanpur =

- Town
- Location in Uttar Pradesh, India
- Coordinates: 26.15°N 83.33°E
- Country: India
- State: Uttar Pradesh
- District: Azamgarh
- Elevation: 70 m (230 ft)

Population (2001)
  - Total: 10,298

Languages
  - Official: Hindi
- Time zone: UTC+5:30 (IST)

Jiyanpur is a town and a nagar panchayat in Azamgarh district in the Indian state of Uttar Pradesh. It lies along State Highway 66.

== Geography ==
Jiyanpur is located at 26.15°N 83.33°E. It has an average elevation of 70 metres (229 feet).

== Demographics ==
As of 2014 India census, Jiyanpur had a population of 40578. Males constitute 53% of the population and females 47%Jiyanpur has an average literacy rate of 78%, lower than the national average of 79.5%: male literacy is 67%, and female literacy is 51%. In Jiyanpur, 19% of the population is under 6 years of age.
