= Alapur =

- village
- Location in Uttar Pradesh, India Alapur (India)
- Coordinates: 26°54′43″N 81°9′41″E
- Country: India
- State: Uttar Pradesh
- District: Barabanki

Languages
  - Official: Hindi
- Time zone: UTC+5:30 (IST)
- PIN: 225125
- Vehicle registration: UP 41

Alapur, is a village in Barabanki district in the state of Uttar Pradesh, India. The village is situated 3 km from Barabanki city towards Lucknow on the west bank of Reth river.

== History ==
During archaeological excavation of ancient mound at Alapur black slipped ware and grey ware dating pre Shunga-Kushana to early medieval period were excavated.

== Geography ==
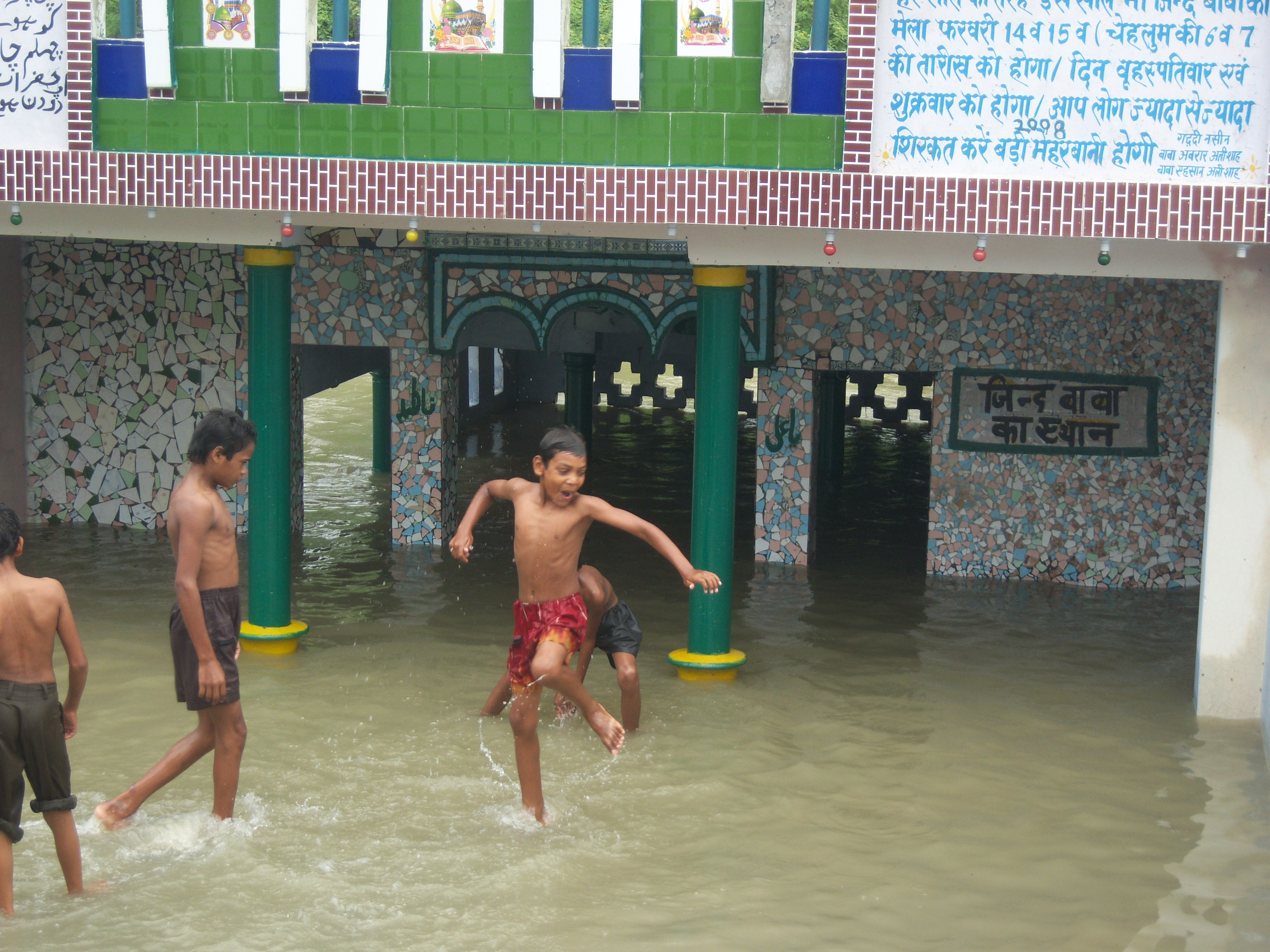
Jind Baba ki Mazar

Alapur is located at 26°54′43″N 81°9′41″E. Jind baba ki Mazar is located on National Highway 27. Lucknow-Faizabad road enters Barabanki by crossing the Reth river by a bridge at Alapur
