= Jalalpur =

- Town
- Location in Uttar Pradesh, India
- Coordinates: 26.30°N 82.75°E
- Country: India
- State: Uttar Pradesh
- Division: Ayodhya division
- District: Ambedkar Nagar
- Tehsil: Jalalpur
- Established: 1876

Government
  - Body: Municipal Board

Area
  - Total: 512.20 km^{2} (197.76 sq mi)
- Elevation: 118 m (387 ft)

Population (2011)
  - Total: 31,972
  - Rank: 36
  - Density: 62.421/km^{2} (161.67/sq mi)

Language
  - Official: Hindi
  - Additional official: Urdu
- Time zone: UTC+5:30 (IST)
- PIN: 224149
- Vehicle registration: UP-45
- Website: ambedkarnagar.nic.in

Jalalpur is a town, tehsil and a municipal board in Ambedkar Nagar district in the Indian state of Uttar Pradesh, India.

== Geography ==
Jalalpur is located at 25.85°N 79.82°E. It has an average elevation of 118 metres (387 ft).

The city is directly connected to Azamgarh, Akbarpur, Shahganj, Rajesultanpur, Varansi, Faizabad, Ayodhya, Lucknow, Kanpur by private bus.

== Demographics ==
As of 2001 India census, Jalalpur had a population of 29,634. Males constitute 51% of the population and females 49%. Jalalpur has an average literacy rate of 69%, higher than the national average of 59.5%: male literacy is 73%, and female literacy is 64%. In Jalalpur, 16% of the population is under 6 years of age.

Religions in Jalalpur
| Religion | Percent |
| Hindus | 29% |
| Muslims | 70% |
| Jains | 0.2% |
| Others† | 0.7% |
Distribution of religions †Includes Sikhs (0.2%), Buddhists (<0.2%).

== Notable people ==
- Anwar Jalalpuri (1947–2018), Indian poet and writer who translated the Geeta to Urdu, entitled "Urdu Shairi Mein Geeta", also worked in the film, Dedh Ishqiya.
