= Syed Amin Ashraf =

Indian academic (1930–2013)

Personal life
- Born: 10 July 1930
- Died: 7 February 2013 (aged 82)
- Era: contemporary
- Region: India
- Main interest: Urdu Ghazal
- Notable work(s): Urdu Ghazal, Urdu Literary Criticism

Religious life
- Religion: Islam

Syed Amin Ashraf (10 July 1930 – 7 February 2013) was an Indian Urdu Ghazal poet and critic. He earned his PhD in English Literature from Aligarh Muslim University on the topic Major Themes and Imagery in Sarogini Naidu's Poetry, and later served the same department. He produced three poetic collections and a critical compendium of essays in the form of a book. Several academic awards were conferred on his poetic anthologies, and numerous critical articles and books praised his poetic artistry.

== Biography ==
Syed Amin Ashraf was born on 10 July 1930 in Kichhauchha Sharif, the eldest child and son of his parents. His father was Syed Habeeb Ashraf. He worked as a librarian in the village's library. He received his primary education at a local madrasa. He received a BA, an MA and a PhD degree from the Aligarh Muslim University.

Ashraf wrote three poetic collections titled, 'Jadae Shab', 'Bahare Ijaad' and 'Qafase Rang'. Barg-o-Baar is a collection of his critical papers. He received awards from Ghalib Academy, New Delhi and Uttar Pradesh Urdu Academy, Lucknow. He also served as the editor of the Aligarh Magazine during 1960's.

Ashraf died of a cardiac arrest in Aligarh, on 7 February 2013, at the age of 82. He was buried beside his father's grave near the shrine of Ashraf Jahangir Semnani at Kichaucha Sharif.

== Literary works ==
- Ashraf, Syed Amin (2000). Jada-e-Shab (in Urdu). Educational Publishing House.
- Ashraf, Syed Amin (2007). Bahar-e-Ijad [ur]. Syed Amin Ashraf.
- Ashraf, Syed Amin (2011). Rizwan, Rizwanur Raza (ed.). Qafas-e-Rang (in Urdu). Syed Amin Ashraf.
- Ashraf, Syed Amin (2012). Barg-o-Bahar (in Urdu). Delhi: M K Offset Press.

== Awards and honours received ==
- U.P. Urdu Academy Award on the book 'Bahare Ijaad', Lucknow(2007).
- U.P. Urdu Academy Award for contribution to Urdu Poetry, Lucknow (2010).
- Maikash Award from Maikash Academy, Aligarh (2010).
- Ghalib Award from Ghalib Academy, New Delhi (2011).
- 19 Nov 2012 – 68. Sheri Nashist at the UGC ASC in honour of Dr. Syed Amin. Ashraf
