= National Highway 233B (India, old numbering) =

National highway in India

National Highway 233B

Route information
- Length: 290 km (180 mi)

Major junctions
- West end: Siddharth Nagar, Uttar Pradesh
- East end: Bilaspur, Chhattisgarh

Location
- Country: India
- Primary destinations: Siddharath Nagar Azamgarh, Mau, Gazipur, Chanduli, Mirzapur, Vikarampur, Sonbhadra, Bilaspur

Highway system
- Roads in India; Expressways; National; State; Asian
← NH 233A	→ NH 234

National Highway 233B is a National Highway in India that links Bilaspur, Chhattisgarh to Siddharath Nagar in Uttar Pradesh.

== See also ==
- List of national highways in India
- National Highways Development Project
