= Akbarpur, Ambedkar Nagar =

City in Uttar Pradesh, India

Akbarpur
- City
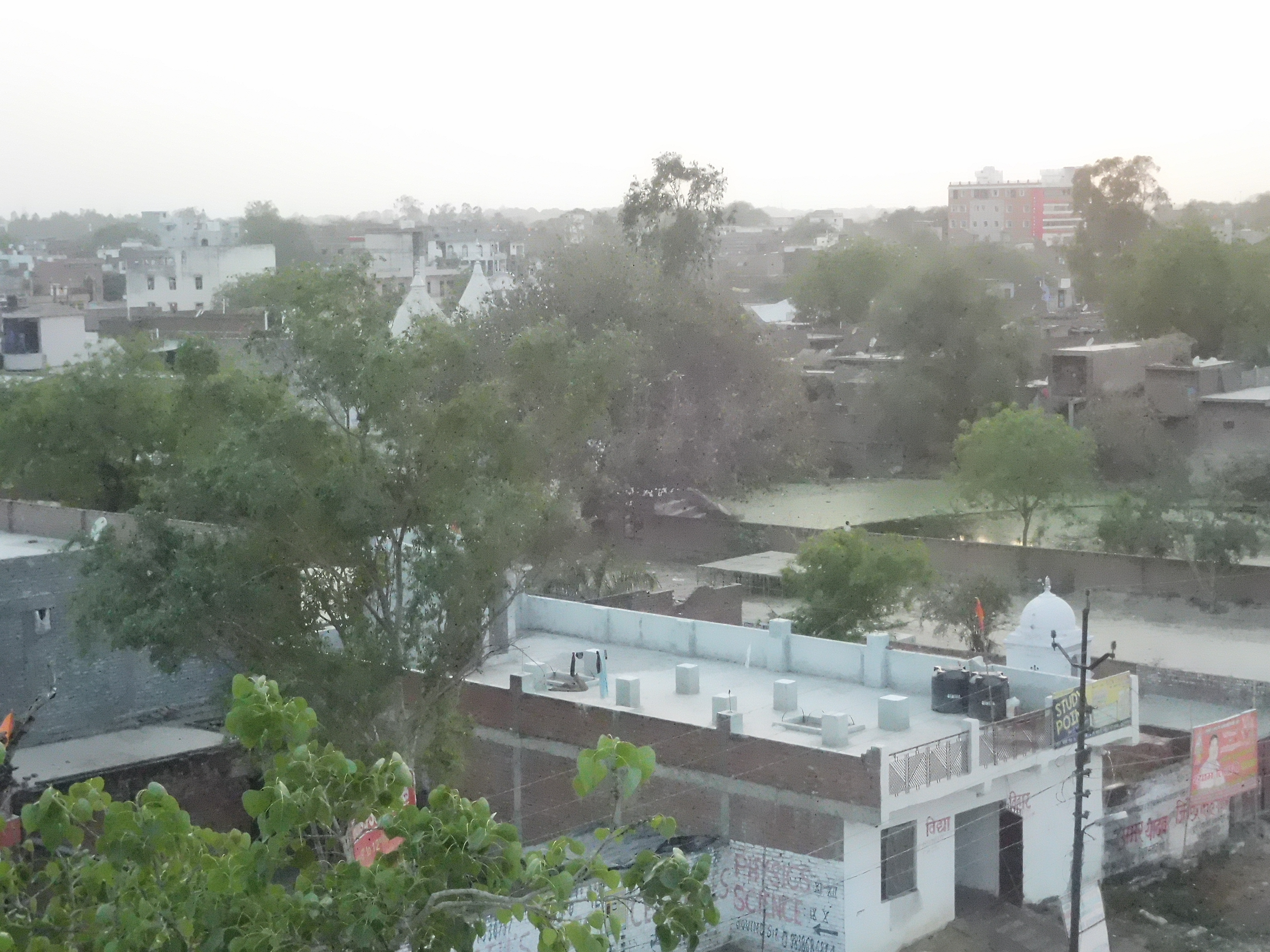
- Akbarpur Skyline

- Location in Uttar Pradesh, India Akbarpur (India)
- Coordinates: 26°26′00″N 82°32′25″E
- Country: India
- State: Uttar Pradesh
- District: Ambedkar Nagar

Government
  - Body: Municipal Board
- Elevation: 133 m (436 ft)

Population (2011)
  - Total: 111,594

Language
  - Official: Hindi
  - Additional official: Urdu
- Time zone: UTC+5:30 (IST)
- PIN: 224122
- Telephone code: +91(5271)
- Vehicle registration: UP-45
- Sex ratio: 1000/937 ♂/♀
- Website: ambedkarnagar.nic.in

Akbarpur is a city, municipal corporation, tehsil, and the administrative headquarters of Ambedkar Nagar district in the state of Uttar Pradesh, India. It is a part of Ayodhya division.

== Mythology ==
According to the Ramayana, Akbarpur is where King Dashratha shot Dhanush Shravana Kumara, at a place called Shravan Kshetra. The ashram of the sage Shringi Rishi was said to be situated here. According to the Ramayana, Rama's son Kusha ruled Shravasti.

== Geography ==
Akbarpur sits along the Tamsa River (also known as the Tons River). The city of Akbarpur proper is located on the left bank of the Tamsa, while the town of Shahzadpur, which has been incorporated under Akbarpur since 1856, lies on the right bank of the Tamsa. Shahzadpur has historically been an important bazaar and centre of trade for the region.

Lorepur, part of Akbarpur City, is noted as the location of the old palace and imambargah of Lorepur.

== History ==
The area in and around present-day Akbarpur was formerly controlled by the Bhars before the Islamic conquest of the region. Prior to the foundation of the city of Akbarpur, the area was known as Sinjhauli, after the still surviving eponymous village, and consisted of seven tappas, those being Sikandarpur, Nahvi, Sarara, Sisani, Karmaul, Kamtar, and Haveli. The division of the area into tappas would not be abandoned until the reign of Saadat Ali Khan.

Akbarpur was founded during the reign of Emperor Akbar by the erstwhile administrator of the pargana of Sinjhauli, Muhammad Mohsin Khan. Mohsin Khan established a fort, as well as a mosque inside of it, on the left bank of the Tamsa as well as a bridge over the river. The mosque bears an inscription in Persian which states that it was constructed by Mohsin Khan in the year 976 Hijri. Akbar is said to have later personally passed through the town, ordering more buildings to be erected at the location. Akbarpur would later become a mint town.

After the foundation of the city, the area would become influenced by the Sayyid house of Pirpur. Akbar is said to have made several members of the house of Pirpur into hereditary chaudharis of the pargana of Akbarpur during his reign. The family would subsequently create estates that would eventually morph into the taluqas of Pirpur and Samanpur, both of which would continue to hold large tracts of land in the region into the era of the British Raj.

== Demographics ==
As of 2011 Indian Census, Akbarpur had a total population of 111,447, of which 57,330 were males and 54,117 were females. Population within the age group of 0 to 6 years was 14,726. The total number of literates in Akbarpur was 72,049, which constituted 64.6% of the population with male literacy of 70.9% and female literacy of 58.1%. The effective literacy rate of 7+ population of Akbarpur was 74.5%, of which male literacy rate was 81.7% and female literacy rate was 66.9%. The Scheduled Castes and Scheduled Tribes population was 15,310 and 50 respectively. Akbarpur had 17720 households in 2011.

Hindi is the official language, while Urdu is the additional official language.

== Administration ==
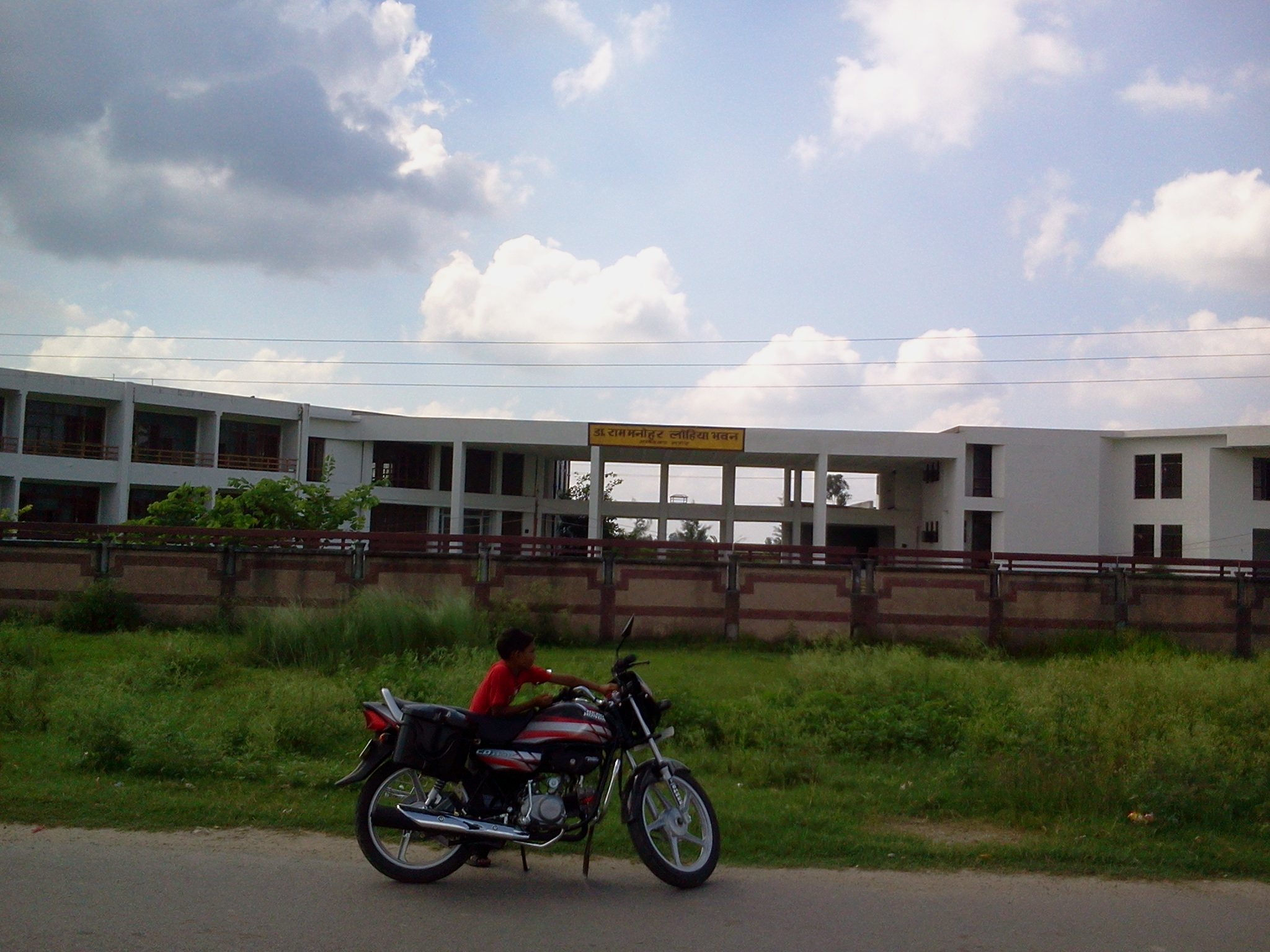
Lohia Bhavan, Akbarpur

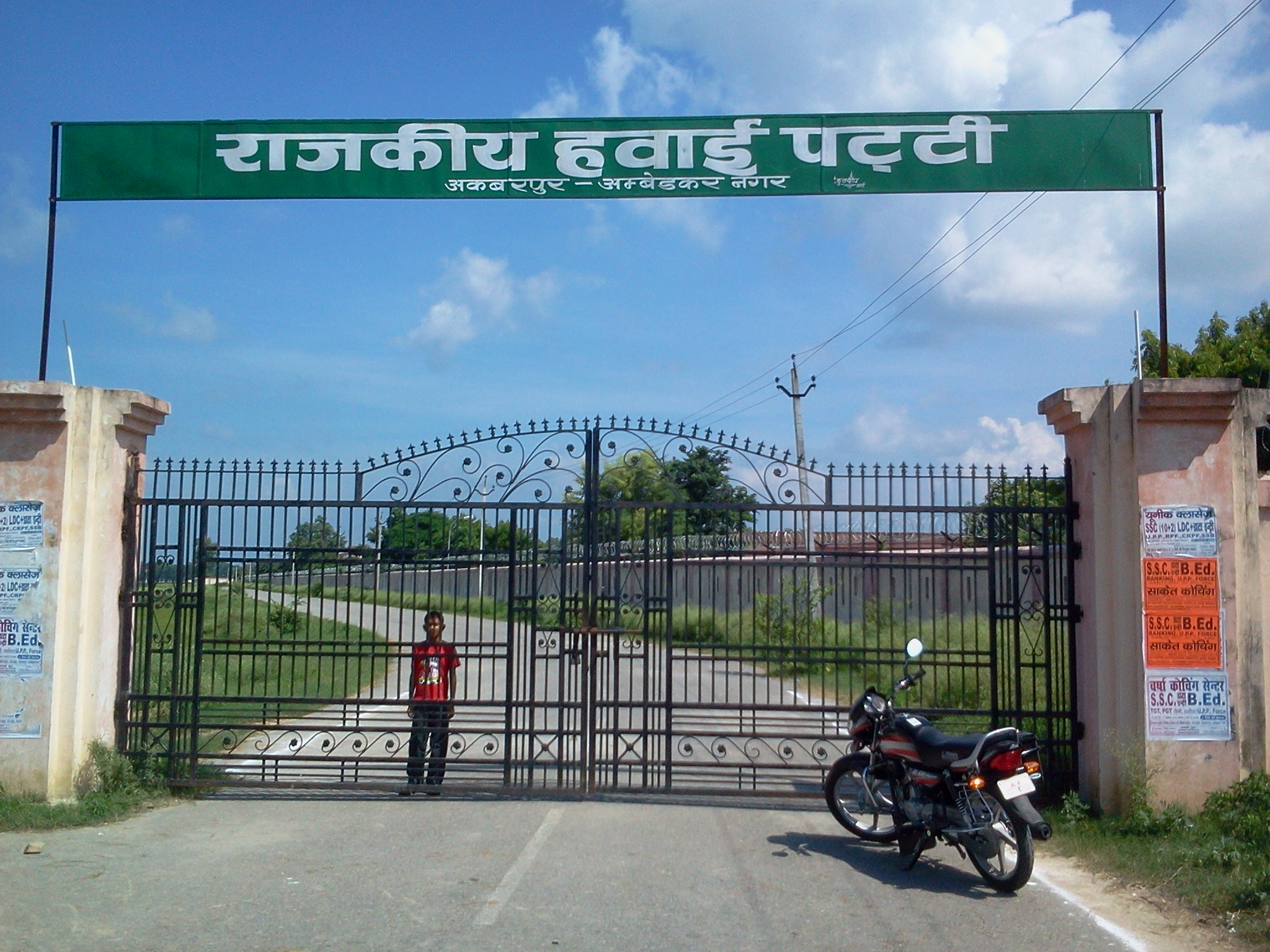
Government airstrip, Akbarpur

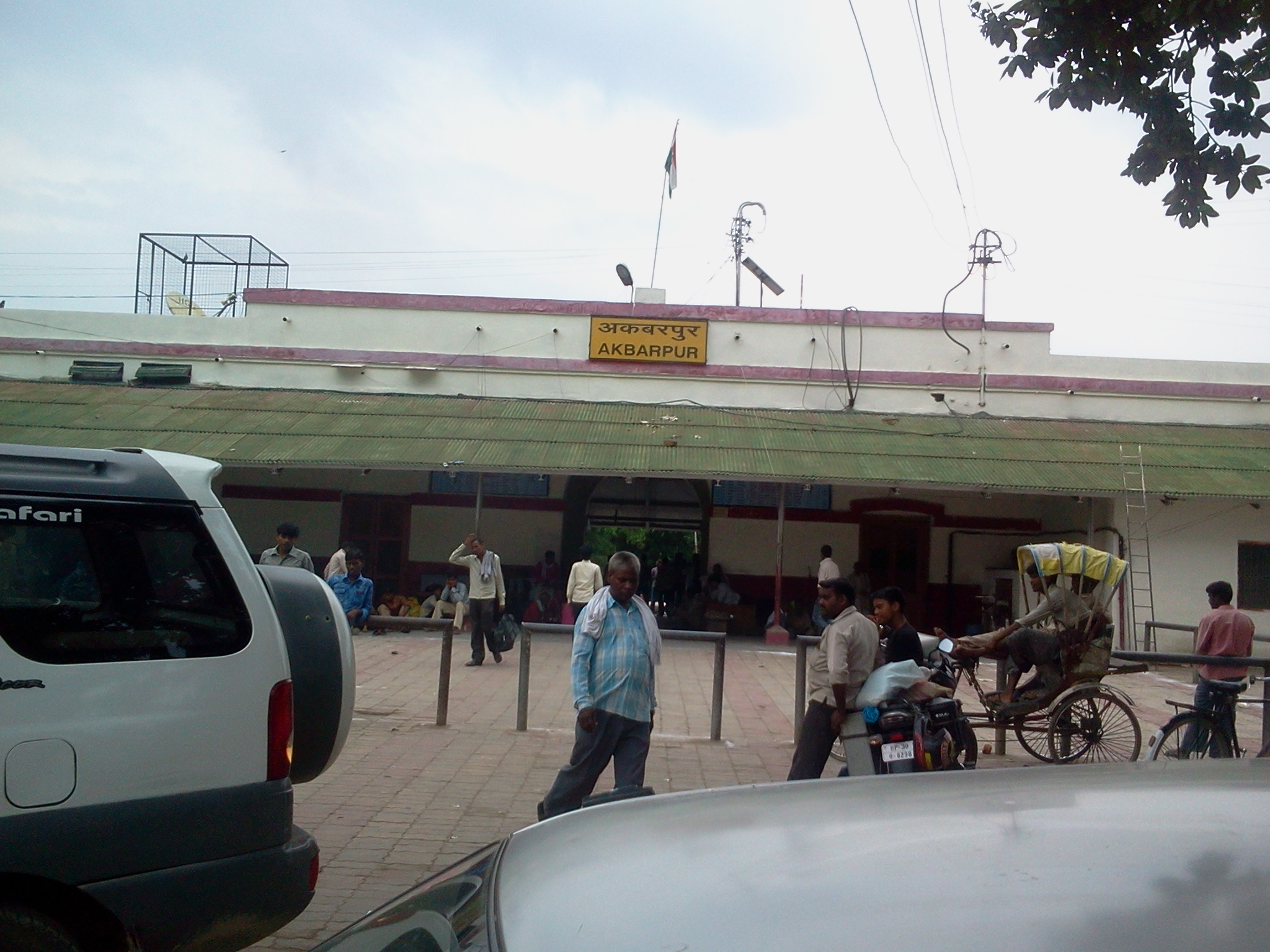
Akbarpur Junction

Akbarpur city is governed by a municipal corporation.

== Economy ==
Major economic activities in the district are power looms and farming. Agricultural industries include rice milling and power and distribution transformer manufacturing. The district is noted for Tanda Terricot clothes based in nearby Tanda. The district has a sugar factory, the Akbarpur Sugar Mill, which is situated near Mijhaura, about 10 kilometres (6.2 mi) from the city. Many rice mills are present in Akbarpur. There is a cement manufacturing plant, the Jaypee Ayoudha Grinding Unit, which belongs to the Jaypee Group. The district has a thermal power station belonging to NTPC Limited.

== Transport ==
=== By road ===
Akbarpur is well connected with the nearby cities of Faizabad, Ayodhya, Lucknow, Sultanpur, Raebareli, Amethi, Azamgarh, Jaunpur, Varanasi, Prayagraj, Pratapgarh; and with the nearby towns of Tanda, Baskhari, Dostpur, Hanswar, Rajesultanpur,Haiderganj, Jalalpur, Jahangirganj, Goshainganj, Tarun, and Bikapur.

The Purvanchal Expressway connects Akbarpur to the capital, New Delhi, via the Agra-Lucknow and Yamuna expressways.

=== By rail ===
Akbarpur Junction is the main railway station in Akbarpur city. Goshainganj, Ayodhya Cantt, Ayodhya Junction, Lucknow Junction, Shahganj Junction and Varanasi Junction are nearby railway stations.

=== By air ===
Ayodhya Airport (Ayodhya), Chaudhary Charan Singh International Airport (Lucknow), Gorakhpur Airport (Gorakhpur), and Lal Bahadur Shastri International Airport (Varanasi) are the nearby airports.

== Education ==
The recent establishment of various local colleges has improved the availability of higher education. The Ramabai Government Women Post Graduate College, Akbarpur, was established in 1997 to provide opportunities in various disciplines to rural, as well as urban, students. BNKBPG College is a privately managed and government-aided co-educational degree college that offers several programs. There is one government engineering college, Mahamaya Engineering College, a medical college, and a recently opened agriculture college.

Many government secondary schools (junior high schools and Rajkiya intermediate colleges) have been opened in town to provide educational opportunities. St. Peter's Inter College is an ICSE-accredited English medium inter college founded in 1984, and it celebrated 25 years of existence in 2009. Radiant college is a CBSE-accredited college in Jalalpur. Narendra Dev Intermediate College is accredited to the U.P. board.

=== Engineering colleges ===
- Rajkiya Engineering College, Ambedkar Nagar is a government Engineering college in Akbarpur, Ambedkar Nagar. It is affiliated with Dr. A.P.J. Abdul Kalam Technical University.
- Mahamaya College of Agricultural Engineering and Technology is a government agriculture engineering college in Akbarpur. It is part of Faizabad's Narendra Dev University of Agriculture and Technology.
- Ramabai Government Women Post Graduate College is a women's pg college.

=== Medical college ===
- Mahamaya Rajkiya Allopathic Medical College, A government medical college in Akbarpur, Ambedkar Nagar

== Religious sites ==
1.Ashrafpur Kichhauchha, a village in Ambedkar Nagar district about 25 kilometres (16 mi) from Akbarpur city, is the location of the shrine of the illustrious 13th Century Chisti Sufi saint Ashraf Jahangir Semnani, which is visited by millions of devotees every year, irrespective of religion, ethnicity, and gender.

2.A popular pilgrimage site is the Hindu temple of Shiv Baba. It is situated 5 kilometres (3.1 mi) from the city, on Faizabad Road, and 50 kilometres (31 mi) from the holy city of Ayodhya. A fair is held here every Monday and Friday.

== Notable people ==
- Syed Amin Ashraf
- Syed Waheed Ashraf
- Syeda Ummehani Ashraf
- Ram Manohar Lohia, Indian freedom fighter and socialist political leader.
- Neem Karoli Baba, spiritual saint
- Abdur-Razzaq Nurul-Ain
- Ashraf Jahangir Semnani

== See also ==
- Akbarpur Railway Station
- Bhaupur, Ambedkar Nagar
- Faizabad Railway Station
- Faizabad Airport
- Katat
- Rajesultanpur
