= Baskhari =

- Town
- Location in Uttar Pradesh, India
- Coordinates: 26.453°N 82.773°E
- Country: India
- State: Uttar Pradesh
- District: Ambedkar Nagar

Government
  - Body: Municipal Board

Area
  - Total: 215 km^{2} (83 sq mi)
- Elevation: 118 m (387 ft)

Population (2015)
  - Total: 18,485
  - Density: 86.0/km^{2} (223/sq mi)

Languages
  - Official: Hindi, Awadhi
- Time zone: UTC+5:30 (IST)
- PIN: 224129
- Telephone code: 05274
- Vehicle registration: UP45
- Website: ambedkarnagar.nic.in

Baskhari is a town (Village Panchayat Block) located in Ambedkar Nagar district in the Indian state of Uttar Pradesh.

== Demographics ==
As of 2001 India census, Baskhari had a population of 18,485. Males constitute 50% of the population and females 50%. Baskhari has an average literacy rate of 65%, higher than the national average of 59.5%: male literacy is 78%, and female literacy is 59%. In Baskhari, 13% of the population is under 6 years of age. Akbarpur, Ambedkar Nagar, Tanda, Ambedkar Nagar, Mau, Sahjanwa, Azamgarh, Rajesultanpur, Hanswar, Jahangir Ganj, are the nearby Cities to Baskhari.

Religions in Baskhari
| Religion | Percent |
| Hindus | 65% |
| Muslim | 34% |
| Jains | 0.5% |
| Others† | 0.5% |
Distribution of religions †Includes Sikhs (0.8%), Buddhists (<0.2%).
