= Ambedkar Nagar district =

District in Uttar Pradesh, India

- District
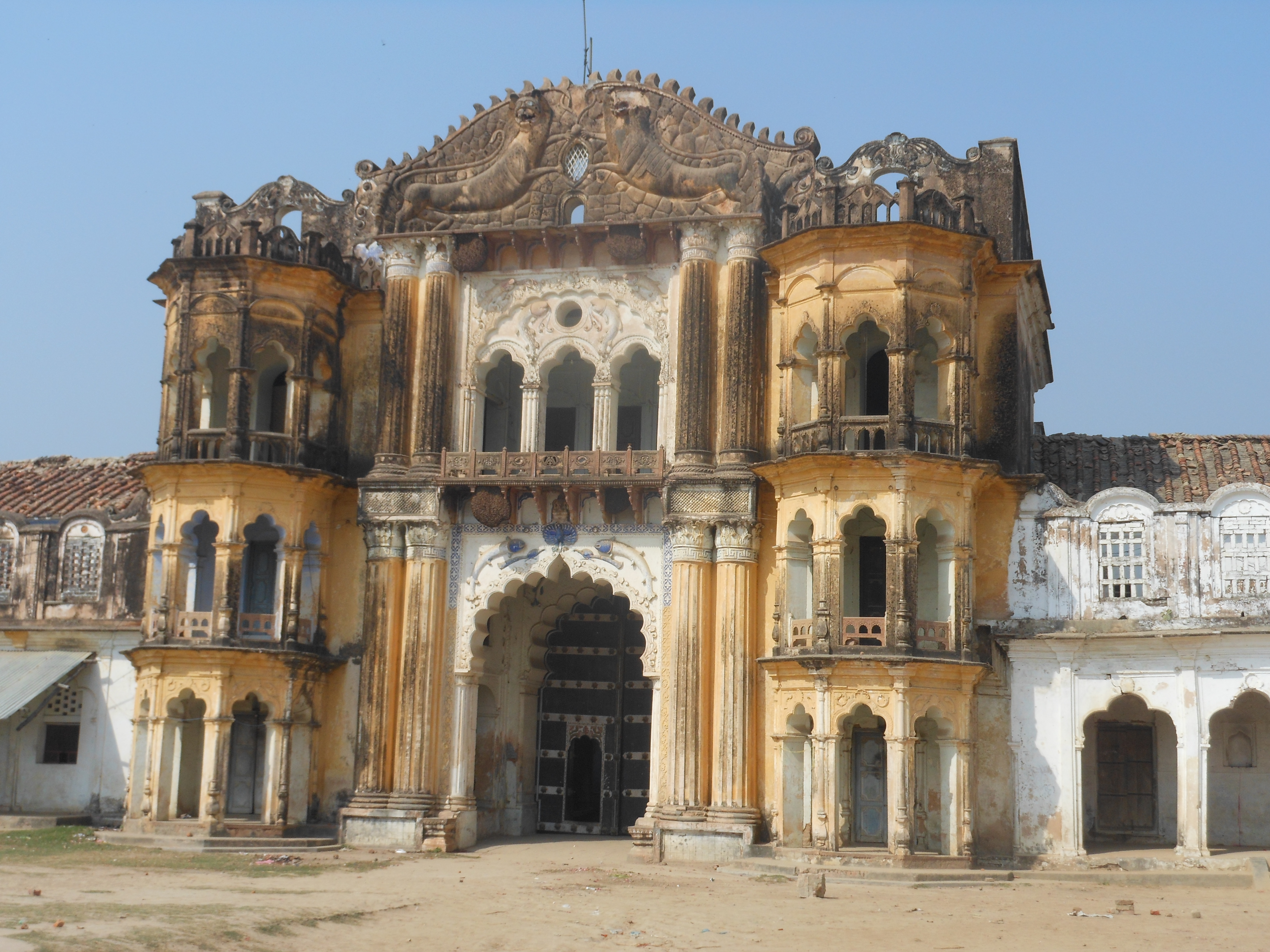
- Fort at Hanswar

- Location of Ambedkar Nagar district in Uttar Pradesh
- Country: India
- State: Uttar Pradesh
- Division: Ayodhya
- Established: 29 September 1995; 31 years ago
- Headquarters: Akbarpur
- Tehsils: Akbarpur, Tanda, Jalalpur, Alapur, Bhiti

Government
  - Lok Sabha constituencies: 1. Ambedkar Nagar Lok Sabha constituency - Akbarpur, Jalalpur, Katehari, Tanda; 2. Sant Kabir Nagar (Lok Sabha constituency) - Alapur
  - Vidhan Sabha constituencies: 1. Katehari; 2. Akbarpur; 3. Tanda; 4. Jalalpur; 5. Alapur
  - District Magistrate: Essha Priya, IAS
  - Superintendent of Police: Prachi Singh, IPS

Area
  - Total: 2,350 km^{2} (910 sq mi)

Population (2011)
  - Total: 2,397,888
  - Density: 1,020/km^{2} (2,640/sq mi)

Demographics
  - Literacy: 74.37%
  - Sex ratio: 976
- Time zone: UTC+05:30 (IST)
- Vehicle registration: UP-45
- Major highways: NH 28, NH 128, NH 233A, NH 233B NH 135A, Purvanchal Expressway, Gorakhpur Link Expressway
- Website: Official Website

Ambedkar Nagar district is one of the 75 districts of the Indian state of Uttar Pradesh. This district is a part of Ayodhya division in the Awadh region of the state. This district was established on 29 September 1995 by carving out parts of the erstwhile Faizabad district (now Ayodhya district). It was created by the then Chief Minister Mayawati and named in memory of B. R. Ambedkar, who worked for the advancement of the depressed classes. Hindi and Awadhi are the most widely spoken languages in the district. The total area of Ambedkar Nagar district is 2350 Sq. Km.

== Geography ==
=== Topography ===
Ambedkar Nagar is located on the north-eastern part of Uttar Pradesh, part of Awadh region. It lies between 26° 09' N to 26° 40' N latitudes and 82° 12' E to 83° 05' E longitudes. It is bounded on the north by Basti and Sant Kabir Nagar districts, on the north-east by Gorakhpur district, on the south by Sultanpur district, on the west by Ayodhya district, on the east by Azamgarh district, and on the south east by Shahganj tehsil of Jaunpur district. The total area of the district is 2,520 km^{2} (970 sq mi). The total length of the district from east to west is approximately 75 km (47 mi) and the breadth from north to south is about 42 km (26 mi).

The district of Ambedkar Nagar forms a part of the central Ganga basin. The soils of the Ambedkar Nagar district are alluvium.

The Sarayu river is the main river and is located at the northern boundary of the district. The Tanda, Rajesultanpur, Ramnagar and Baskhari blocks are located along this river and use its water for irrigation. Irrigation in the Baskhari block is also from Lake Devhat, the Rajesultanpur Lake and the Hanswar Lake. Lake Darvan provides water in the Katehari block. The Akbarpur, Bhiti, Bhiyaon, and Jalalpur blocks depend upon smaller rivers and seasonal streams. The city of Akbarpur is situated on the banks of the River Tons (Tamsa), which divides the city into the two parts Akbarpur and Shahzadpur, with the latter being the main commercial centre of the city.

=== Climate ===
The climate of the district resembles that of eastern Uttar Pradesh. It is characterised by a rhythm of seasons, which are produced by south-west and north-east monsoon. The reversal of winds takes place twice a year. The climate of the district may be classified into three distinct seasons.

- Cold weather season (November to February)
- Hot weather season (March to mid-June)
- Season of rains (mid-June to October)

The cold weather season lasts from November to February. In November, the belt of high pressure extends from north-west India and covers the whole of the Uttar Pradesh. The temperature beings to decline and the maximum and minimum are 32.15 and 8.95 °C (89.87 and 48.11 °F) respectively, in this month. The prevailing winds blow from west to east and are influenced by the pressure distribution and pattern of the Himalayas.

== Demography ==
Historical population
| Year | Pop. | ±% p.a. |
|---|---|---|
| 1901 | 641,783 | — |
| 1911 | 604,679 | −0.59% |
| 1921 | 614,107 | +0.15% |
| 1931 | 631,356 | +0.28% |
| 1941 | 691,971 | +0.92% |
| 1951 | 777,416 | +1.17% |
| 1961 | 866,321 | +1.09% |
| 1971 | 1,046,122 | +1.90% |
| 1981 | 1,291,125 | +2.13% |
| 1991 | 1,629,353 | +2.35% |
| 2001 | 2,026,876 | +2.21% |
| 2011 | 2,397,888 | +1.70% |

According to the 2011 census Ambedkar Nagar district has a population of 2,397,888, This gives it a ranking of 186th in India (out of a total of 640). The district has a population density of 1,021 inhabitants per square kilometre (2,640/sq mi). Its population growth rate over the decade 2001-2011 was 18.35%. Ambedkar Nagar has a sex ratio of 976 females for every 1000 males, and a literacy rate of 74.37%. 11.71% of the population lives in urban areas. Scheduled Castes make up 24.65% of the population.

The distribution of population in each block is controlled by physical conditions and socio-economic causes. Akbarpur block has the highest share of population (16.56%), followed by Jalalpur (13.80%), Tanda (12.32%), Ramnagar (10.26%), Katehri (10.03%), Bhiyaon (9.78%), Baskhari (9.53%), Jahangirganj (9.17%) and Bhiti (8.55%).

=== Religion ===
Religion in Ambedkar Nagar district (2011)
| Religion | Percent |
| Hinduism | 82.81% |
| Islam | 16.75% |
| Other or not stated | 0.44% |

Hinduism is major religion in Ambedkar Nagar district with 1.985.654 Hindus (82.81%). Islam is second largest religion with 401,678 Muslims (16.75%). Other religions includes 2.536 Christians (0.11%), 1.817 Buddhists (0.08%), 869 Sikhs (0.04%), 235 Jains (0.01%), 5.066 did not stated (0.21%) and 33 did other (<0.01%).

=== Languages ===
Languages of Ambedkar Nagar district (2011)
1. Hindi (79.5%)
2. Awadhi (10.7%)
3. Urdu (8.09%)
4. Bhojpuri (1.63%)
5. Others (0.12%)

The official languages of the district are Hindi and Urdu. The most spoken languages of Ambedkar Nagar district are Hindi and Awadhi.

At the time of the 2011 Census of India, 79.45% of the population in the district spoke Hindi, 10.71% Awadhi, 8.09% Urdu and 1.63% Bhojpuri as their first language.

The areas of Birhar and Surhurpur speak Bhojpuri as opposed to Awadhi.

== Cities and towns ==
=== Ambedkar Nagar nagar panchayat and nagar palika ===
- Akbarpur
- Tanda
- Rajesultanpur
- Jalalpur
- Ashrafpur Kichhauchha
- Iltifatganj
- Jahangir Ganj
- Mubarakpur

=== Blocks ===
- Akbarpur
- Baskhari
- Bhiti
- Bhiyaon
- Jahangir Ganj
- Jalalpur
- Katehari
- Ramnagar, Alapur
- Tanda

=== Major villages ===
- Malipur
- Sekhauliya, Uttar Pradesh

== Economy ==
Ambedkar Nagar is known for its textile industry, power plant, sugar plant and cement manufacturing plant. Tanda town is well known for its "Tanda Terrycot". The major economic activity of the district is agro-based industries, firms small, power looms and farming. There is a thermal power plant belonging to the NTPC called Tanda thermal power plant at Makhdoom Nagar area near Tanda. Jaypee Group (Jaypee Ayoudha Greeding) has set up a cement manufacturing plant at Naseebjot Village near Tanda. The district has a sugar factory called Akbarpur Sugar Mill, which is situated near Mijhaura, about ten kilometres from the district headquarters. Akbarpur is a very important town and district headquarter of Ambedkar Nagar district with active participation in the production of plastic along with farm based products.

In 2006 the Ministry of Panchayati Raj named Ambedkar Nagar one of the country's 250 most backward districts (out of a total of 640). It is one of the 34 districts in Uttar Pradesh currently receiving funds from the Backward Regions Grant Fund Programme (BRGF).

== Tourism ==
- Shravan Kshetra Dham at the confluence of holy rivers Tamsa and biswi.
- The shrine of Ashraf Jahangir Semnani is located in Kichhauchha Sharif.

== Transport ==
=== Bus stations ===
- Akbarpur (Akbarpur, Ayodhya, Sultanpur depot,Dr Ambedkar Depot,Basti Depot,Mau Depot)
- Tanda (Ayodhya depot)
- Rajesultanpur (Azamgarh depot, Ayodhya depot, Civil Line depot,Zero Road depot,Dr Ambedkar depot)
- Baskhari (Akbarpur depot, Doharighat depot)

=== Railway station ===
- Akbarpur railway station

Nearby stations

- Ayodhya cantt railway station
- Sultanpur railway station

== Education ==
=== Medical and engineering colleges ===
- Acharya Narendra Deva University of Agriculture and Technology, a government Agriculture Engineering college in Akbarpur

=== Other colleges ===
- Gandhi Smarak Inter College, Rajesultanpur

== Media ==
Ambedkar Nagar has some active media groups which continuously give news updates on Ambedkar Nagar news in Hindi, including breaking news and current news. These media groups include Amar Ujala, Dainik Jagaran, Avadhnama Urdu Dainik Bhaskar, Hindustan and Soochna News.

== Notable people ==
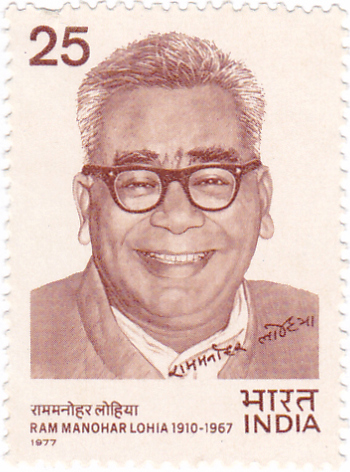
Ram Manohar Lohia

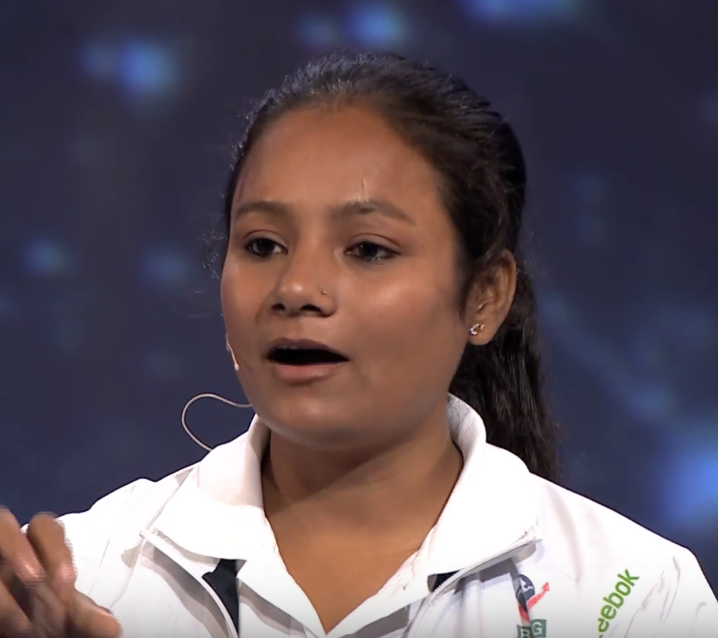
Arunima Sinha

- Masood Ahmad, Ex-MLA Tanda and member of the 1993 Legislative Assembly of Uttar Pradesh of India.
- Muhammad Madni Ashraf Ashrafi Al-Jilani, Grand Mufti of India and Islamic scholar, Sufi, author
- Syed Amin Ashraf (1931-2013), Urdu poet and academic at the Department of English, Aligarh Muslim University, from Kichaucha Sharif
- Syed Waheed Ashraf, Sufi poet and scholar of Persian and Urdu languages hailing from Kichaucha Sharif in Ambedkar Nagar district
- Bashir Badr, poet who writes in Urdu language, especially ghazals.
- Mahdi Hasan, anatomist and Padma Shree awardee
- Anwar Jalalpuri (1947 - 2 January 2018) an Urdu poet from Jalalpur, Ambedkar Nagar, who translated the Bhagavad Gita from Sanskrit to Urdu.
- Naseem Khan politician for the Indian National Congress
- Ram Manohar Lohia, politician from Akbarpur
- Hashmi Miya, Muslim scholar, Sufi, and author, also known as Syed Mohammed Hashmi Ashrafi Al Jilani
- Azimulhaq Pahalwan, Ex-MLA Tanda and member of the Sixteenth Legislative Assembly of Uttar Pradesh of India.
- Hari Om Pandey, member of parliament from BJP
- Rakesh Pandey, MLA Jalalpur from Samajvadi Party and Ex-MP Ambedkar Nagar from Bahujan Samajvadi Party.
- Ritesh Pandey, MP Ambedkar Nagar and Ex-MLA from Jalalpur from Bahujan Samajvadi Party
- Ram Achal Rajbhar, MLA reprsenting the Akbarpur Assembly constituency from 1993 to 2012 and from 2017 onwards.
- Arunima Sinha, the first Indian woman amputee to climb Mount Everest
- Jai Ram Varma (4 February 1904 – 14 January 1987), Indian freedom fighter, politician, and Member of Parliament, Lok Sabha of India.
- Lalji Verma Ex. Minister Uttar Pradesh government and leader of the BSP legislative assembly.
- Ram Murti Verma MLA from Tanda, member of Samajwadi Party, former minister in Akhilesh Yadav's government, ex-MLA from Akbarpur.
