= Rajesultanpur =

- Town
- Location in Uttar Pradesh, India Rajesultanpur (India)
- Coordinates: 26°18′17″N 83°4′44″E
- Country: India
- State: Uttar Pradesh
- District: Ambedaker Nagar
- Established: 20 January 1695

Government
  - Type: Nagar panchayat
  - Body: Nagar Panchayat Rajesultanpur

Area
  - Total: 8 km^{2} (3.1 sq mi)
  - Rank: 5
- Elevation 49: 145 m (476 ft)

Population (2011)30,698
  - Total: 28,852
  - Rank: 07
  - Density: 3,600/km^{2} (9,300/sq mi)
- Demonym: Indian

Language
  - Official: Hindi
  - Additional official: Urdu
- Time zone: UTC+5:30 (IST)
- PIN: 224176
- Vehicle registration: UP-45
- Website: nprajesultanpur.in

Rajesultanpur or Raje Sultanpur is a town and nagar panchayat in Ambedkar Nagar district in the Indian state of Uttar Pradesh.

== Demographics ==
Rajesultanpur' Town population is 28632.

Religions in Rajesultanpur
Religion	Percent
Hindus	95%
Muslims	4%
Buddhism	0.75%
Others†	0.25%
Distribution of religions †Includes Sikhs (0%), Jain (<0%).

As of 2011 India census, Population of children with age 0–6 years is 16636 which makes up 32.32% of total population of Rajesultanpur. Average Sex Ratio of Rajesultanpur is 1090 Females (per 1000 Males) which is higher than Uttar Pradesh state average of 912 Females. Child Sex Ratio of Rajesultanpur as per census is 1009 (per 1000 Males), which is also higher than Uttar Pradesh average of 902 Females.

Rajesultanpur has higher literacy rate contrasted with Uttar Pradesh. In 2011, literacy rate of Rajesultanpur was 90.42% contrasted to 67.68% of Uttar Pradesh. In Rajesultanpur Male literacy stands at 97.95% while female literacy rate was 82.78%.

== Government and politics ==
The town is governed by the 'Nagar Panchayat Rajesultanpur'.

== Transportation ==
=== Rail ===
The rail connections are used primarily for passenger trains but also as goods transportation through Akbarpur Railway Station and Ayodhya Cantt railway station . Rajesultanpur is around 120 km from Varanasi, 250 km from Lucknow, 120 km from Faizabad; 113 km from Ayodhya and 60 km from Gorakhpur. Rajesultanpur connected in future via Purvanchal Expressway with four lane to Gorakhpur.

=== Air ===
The nearest airports are Ayodhya Airport, Varanasi Airport and Chaudhary Charan singh International Airport, Lucknow.

=== Road ===
Frequent government bus services are not available to nearby towns and cities, although many private travel agencies run frequent bus services to Azamgarh and Faizabad such as SBS (Singh Bus Service). For short journeys, jeeps and cars are the common means of transportation. For internal transport, the rickshaw is very common.

==== Highways ====
- NH 233A
- NH 233B

==== Roads ====
- Rajesultanpur -Tanda Road
- Rajesultanpur -Maharajganj-Kaptanganj-Azamgarh Road
- Rajesultanpur -Deulpur
- Rajesultanpur -Sikariganj Road
- Rajesultanpur -Sabitpur-Doharighat Road
- Rajesultanpur -Atroliya Road

== Education ==
- SLJB PG College, established in 1996.
- BBS PG College
- RMRS PG College

== See also ==
- Ghughurpatti
- Ambedkar Nagar
- Faizabad
- Ayodhya
- Rajesharyarpur
