= Amaniganj, Ayodhya =

Town in Uttar Pradesh, India

Amaniganj
- Town
- Location within Uttar Pradesh
- Coordinates: 26°40′29.03″N 81°46′20.57″E
- Country: India
- State: Uttar Pradesh
- Division: Ayodhya
- District: Ayodhya
- Tehsil: Milkipur
- Block: Amaniganj

Language
  - Official language: Hindi
  - Regional language: Awadhi
- Time zone: UTC+5:30 (IST)
- PIN: 224121
- Vehicle registration: UP-42

Amaniganj is a town in Milkipur tehsil, Ayodhya district in the Indian state of Uttar Pradesh. Amaniganj is situated on Milkipur-Rudauli road and is 51 km away from district headquarters Ayodhya city. Amaniganj is a block in Ayodhya, Uttar Pradesh.

There is a big market, shopping centres, food shops, TVS automobile agency, big vegetable market, hospital, many bank branches like State Bank of India, schools and colleges in Amaniganj, Ayodhya. Pin code of Amaniganj is 224121.

== Transport ==
=== By Road ===
Amaniganj has good connectivity by road with Ayodhya, Barabanki, Lucknow, Sultanpur, Amethi, Raebareli, Akbarpur, Basti, Pratapgarh and Prayagraj. The state government's Road Transport Service runs regular buses to these cities. And Nearby towns Rudauli, Milkipur, Bhelsar, Harringtonganj, Kumarganj, Shahganj, Khandasa, Kochha, Khajurahat, Motiganj, Inayat Nagar, Haliyapur, Bikapur, Bhadarsa, Masodha, Chaure Bazar, Haiderganj, Tarun, Sohawal and Raunahi are also well connected with Amaniganj, Ayodhya.

=== By Train ===
Rudauli is the nearest railway station to Amaniganj, Ayodhya. Ayodhya Junction, Ayodhya Cantt, Goshainganj, Nihalgarh, Barabanki Junction, Musafirkhana, Sultanpur Junction and Amethi are the nearby railway stations from Amaniganj, Ayodhya.

=== By Air ===
Ayodhya International Airport (Ayodhya), Chaudhary Charan Singh International Airport (Lucknow) and Prayagraj Airport (Prayagraj) are the nearby airports to reach Amaniganj, Ayodhya.
