= Bhelsar =

Village in Uttar Pradesh, India

Bhelsar or Bhilser
- Village
- Location in Uttar Pradesh, India
- Coordinates: 26.783811°N 81.759722°E
- Country: India
- State: Uttar Pradesh
- Division: Ayodhya
- District: Ayodhya
- Tehsil: Rudauli

Language
  - Official language: Hindi
  - Regional language: Awadhi And Urdu
- Time zone: UTC+5:30 (IST)
- PIN: 224116
- Vehicle registration: UP-42

Bhelsar or Bhilser is a village in Rudauli tehsil, Ayodhya district in the Indian state of Uttar Pradesh, India. Bhelsar is situated on NH-27 Lucknow- Ayodhya road in Ayodhya, Uttar Pradesh. Bhelsar 3 km away from Rudauli Town. And Bhelsar is 39 km west of district headquarters Ayodhya city.

== Transport ==
=== Road ===
Bhelsar is well connected with cities and towns due to good road connectivity. Bhelsar is located near the Ayodhya - Barabanki NH-27 highway in Ayodhya, Uttar Pradesh. Ayodhya, Barabanki, Gonda are the nearby cities connected well with Bhelsar. Rudauli, Sohawal, Raunahi, Patranga, Milkipur, Kumarganj, Masodha, Bhadarsa, Bikapur, Tarun, Maya Bazar, Goshainganj, Haiderganj and Chaure Bazar are the nearby towns in Ayodhya, Uttar Pradesh.

=== Railway ===
Rudauli railway station is the nearest from Bhelsar which connects with Indian railways. Rudauli, Ayodhya Cantt, Ayodhya Junction, Barabanki Junction and Goshainganj are the nearby railway stations from Bhelsar, Ayodhya.

=== Air ===
Ayodhya International Airport (Ayodhya) and Chaudhary Charan Singh International Airport (Lucknow) are the nearby airports from Bhelsar, Ayodhya.
