= Baragaon =

Baragaon may refer to several places in India:

== Bihar ==
- Baragaon, Nalanda, a village in the Nalanda district

== Himachal Pradesh ==
- Baragaon, Himachal, a village in Shimla district

== Karnataka ==
- Baragaon, Karnataka, a village in Khanapur taluka, Belagavi district

== Uttar Pradesh ==
- Baragaon, Ayodhya, a village in Ayodhya district
- Baragaon, Barabanki, a village in Barabanki district
- Baragaon, Jhansi, a town in the Jhansi district
- Baragaon, Kotla, a village in Kotla block, Firozabad district
- Baragaon, Mainpuri, a village in Mainpuri district
- Baragaon, Shahganj, a village in Shahganj, Jaunpur district
- Baragaon, Varanasi, a town in the Varanasi district

== See also ==
- Badagaon, a town in Tikamgarh district, Madhya Pradesh, India
- Badagoan, a town in Shajapur district, Madhya Pradesh, India
- Boragaon, a village in Chikkodi taluka, Belagavi district, Karnataka, India
