= Raithuwa =

Village in India

- Village
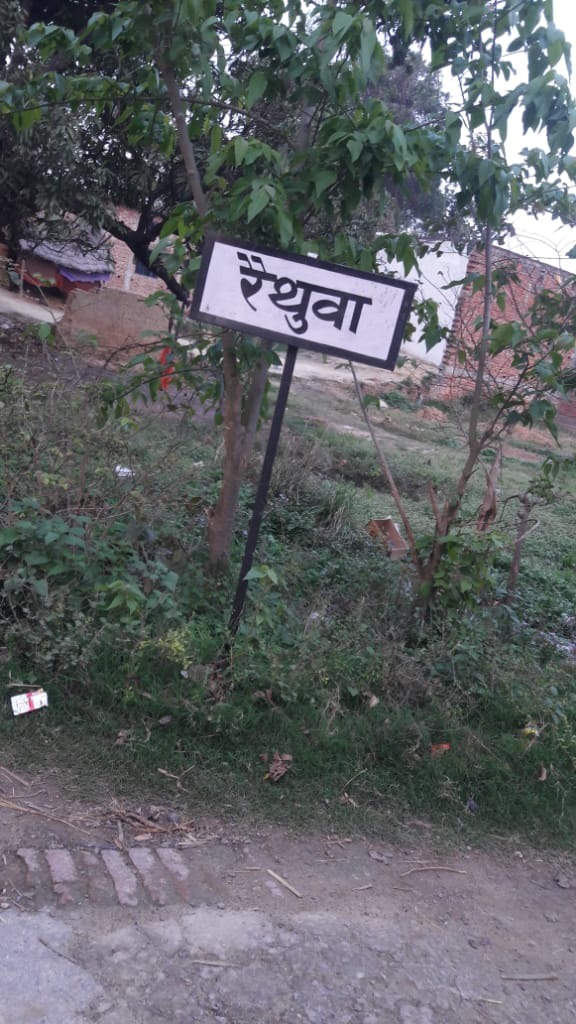
- Sign board of Raithuwa village

- Location within Uttar Pradesh Location within India
- Country: India
- State: Uttar Pradesh
- District: Ayodhya
- Established: 19 century

Population (2011)
  - Total: 3,200

Languages
  - Official: Hindi,
  - Additional official: Urdu
- Time zone: UTC+5:30 (IST)
- Postal code: 224202
- Website: up.gov.in

Raithuwa is a village in Sohawal tehsil in Ayodhya district of the Indian state of Uttar Pradesh, India. The nearest town to Raithuwa is Bhadarsa which is 6 km away. Raituwa is 19 km south of district headquarters Ayodhya city.

As of May 2021, the village is headed by Pradhan Shri Mo Ishtiyaq.

== Geography ==
Masodha Block, which Raithuwa is located within, is bordered by Pura Bazar Block to the east, Bikapur Block to the south, Ayodhya Block to the north, and Harringtonganj Block to the west.

== Transport ==
This village is directly connected to Sultanpur, Bahraich, Gonda, Basti, Azamgarh, Akbarpur, Ambedkar Nagar, Varanasi, Ayodhya, Lucknow, Kanpur and other big cities by public bus and private bus as well.

== Railway Station ==
The nearest Railway station of the village is Bharatkund railway station that is approximately 4 km.

== Demographics ==
According to the 2011 Census of India, the village had a population of 3200 people, with roughly equivalent numbers of males and females. Raithuwa has a below-average literacy rate compared to the rest of Uttar Pradesh. In 2011, the literacy rate of Raithuwa was 65.12% compared to the Uttar Pradesh average of 67.68%. In Raithuwa, the male literacy stands significantly higher than that of female literacy with the male literacy rate at 75.32% and the female literacy rate at 55.15%. The population of children under six years old was more than 500, About 20% of the total population.

As per the constitution of India and Panchyati Raaj Act, Raithuwa is administrated by a sarpanch, who is the elected representative of the village. There is also a post office within the village.

Religions in Raithuwa
| Religion | Percent |
| Hindus | 49% |
| Muslims | 50% |
| Others† | 1% |
Distribution of religions

== Education ==
There are two schools in the village, one a government-run primary school and the other an Urdu language secondary school. Within a 5 km radius of the village there are approximately 10 schools, including 4 English language secondary schools and 5 Undergraduate schools.

== Festivals ==
=== Hindu festivals ===
According to Hindu calendar Vikram Samvat lunar calendar chaitra is considered as first month. Hindu festivals celebrated include Navaratri and Rama Navami, Rakshabandhan, Deepawali, and Holi.

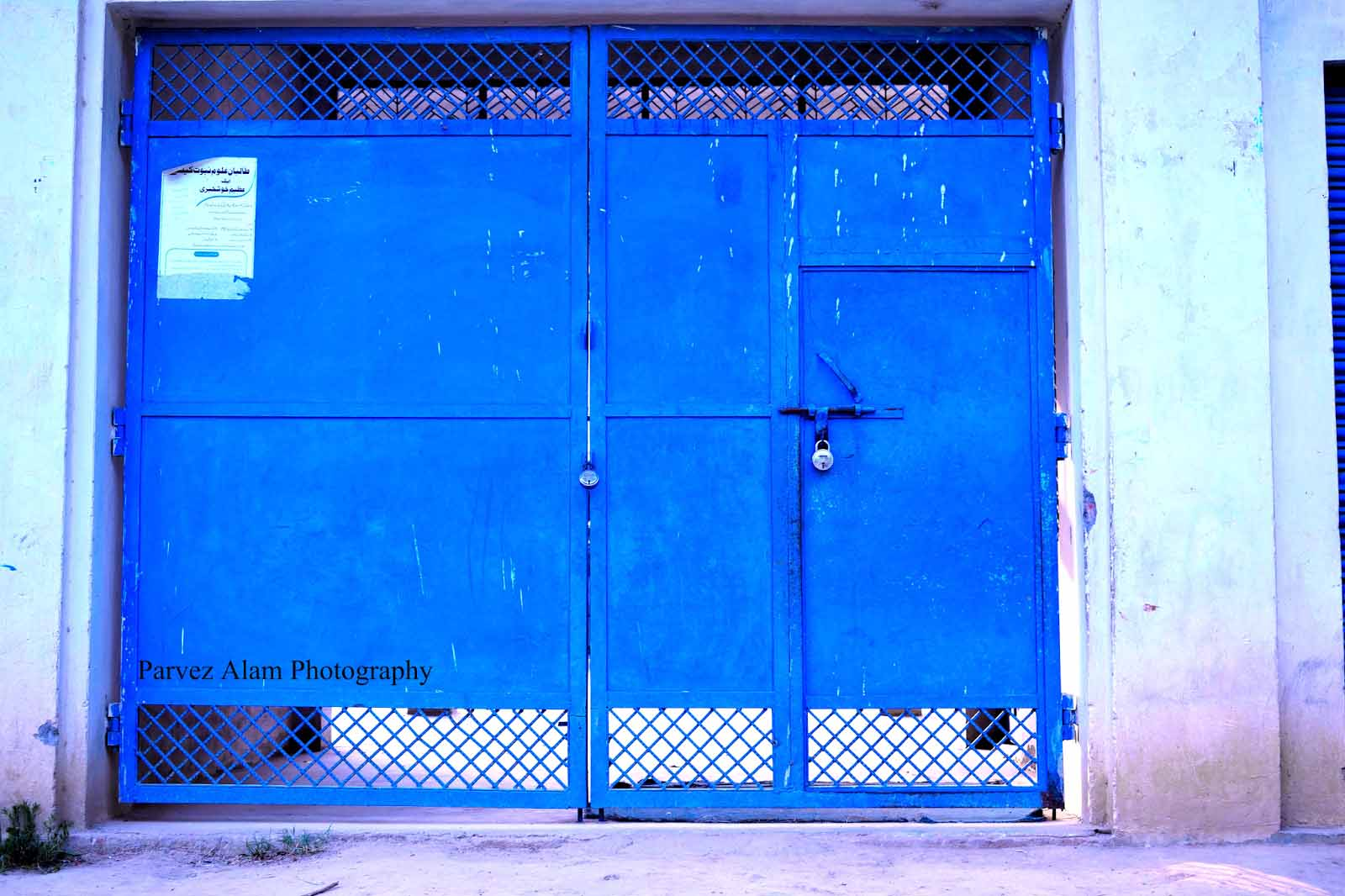
Gate of Madarsa Mohammadia Kashiful Uloom

=== Muslim festivals ===
The Muslim calendar begins with the month of Muharram. Muslim festivals celebrated including Eid-ul-Fitr, and Bakra Eid.

== See also ==
- Nandigram (Bharatkund)
- Bharatkund railway station
