= Nandigram, Ayodhya =

Religious place in Ayodhya, India

Nandigram Bharatkund
- Village
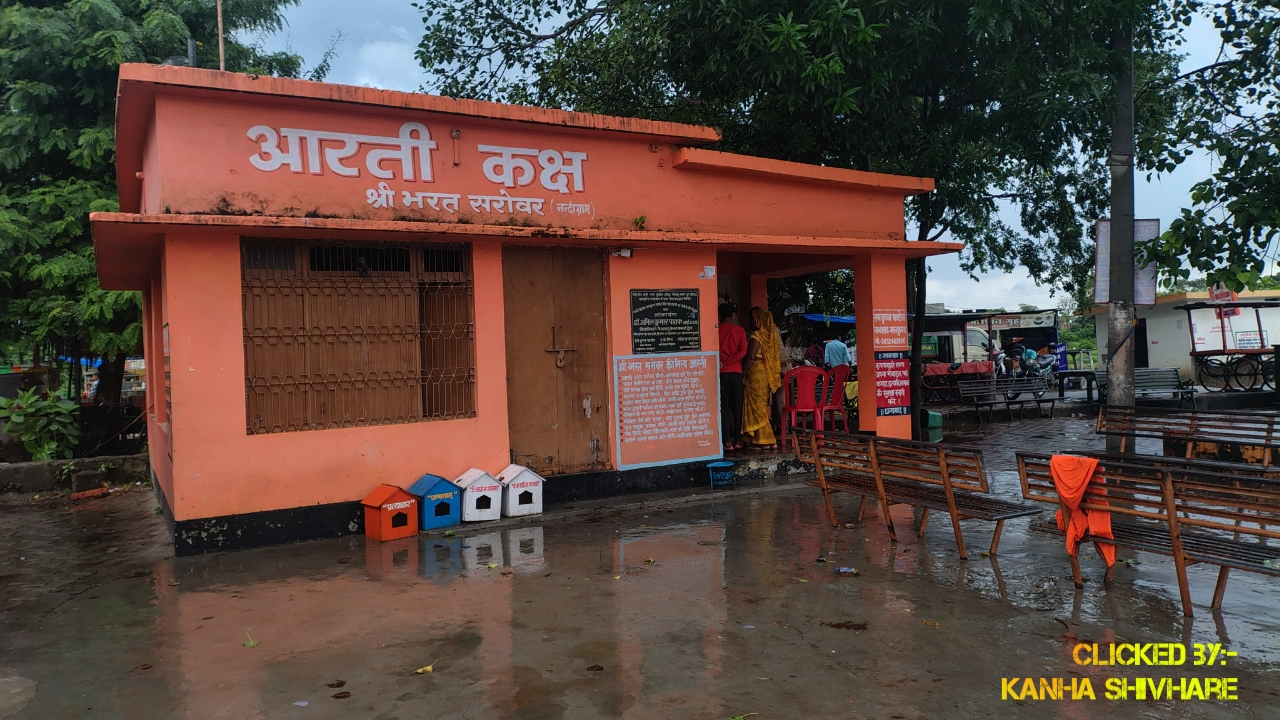
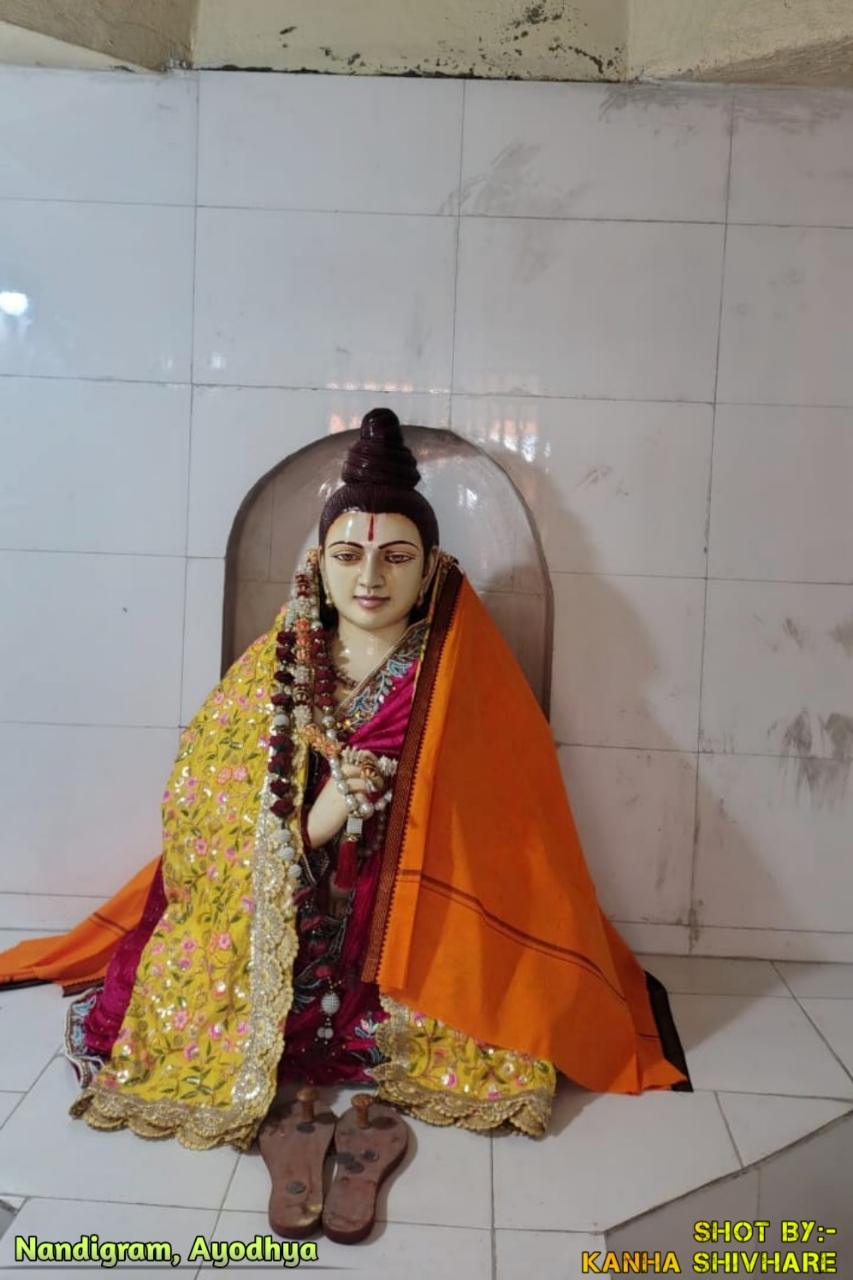
- Aarti kaksh at Bharat sarovar Bharat mandir in Nandigram

- Nandigram (Uttar Pradesh) Nandigram (India) Nandigram (Asia)
- Coordinates: 26.65°N 82.15°E
- Country: India
- State: Uttar Pradesh
- Division: Ayodhya
- District: Ayodhya
- Tehsil: Sohawal
- Named for: Bharata
- Time zone: UTC+5:30 (IST)
- Postal code: 224202
- Vehicle registration: UP-42

Nandigram, also known by ancient name Bharatkund, is a village and religious place in Sohawal tehsil in Ayodhya district in the Indian state of Uttar Pradesh, India. During the exile of Lord Ram, King Bharat ruled from Nandigram instead of the kingdom's capital Ayodhya. Nandigram is 15 km (9.3 mi) south of district headquarters Ayodhya city.

The pincode of Nandigram is 224202, Nandigram comes under Bharatkund post office. As of 2011 census of India, population of the village was approximately 1500.

== Transport ==
=== Road ===
Nandigram is very close to Ayodhya - Sultanpur NH 330 therefore there is a good road connectivity with nearby cities and towns from Nandigram. Ayodhya, Sultanpur and Akbarpur are the nearby cities connected well with Nandigram. Bhadarsa, Bikapur, Masodha, Tarun, Haiderganj and Chaure Bazar are the nearby towns also good connected with Nandigram.

=== Railway ===
The nearest local railway station to reach Nandigram is Bharatkund railway station. Ayodhya Cantt and Ayodhya Dham Junction are the nearby railway stations to reach Nandigram.

=== Air ===
Ayodhya Airport and Chaudhary Charan Singh International Airport (Lucknow) are the nearby airports from Nandigram.

== Schools and colleges ==
- M. J. S. Academy School, Bharatkund.

== Gallery ==
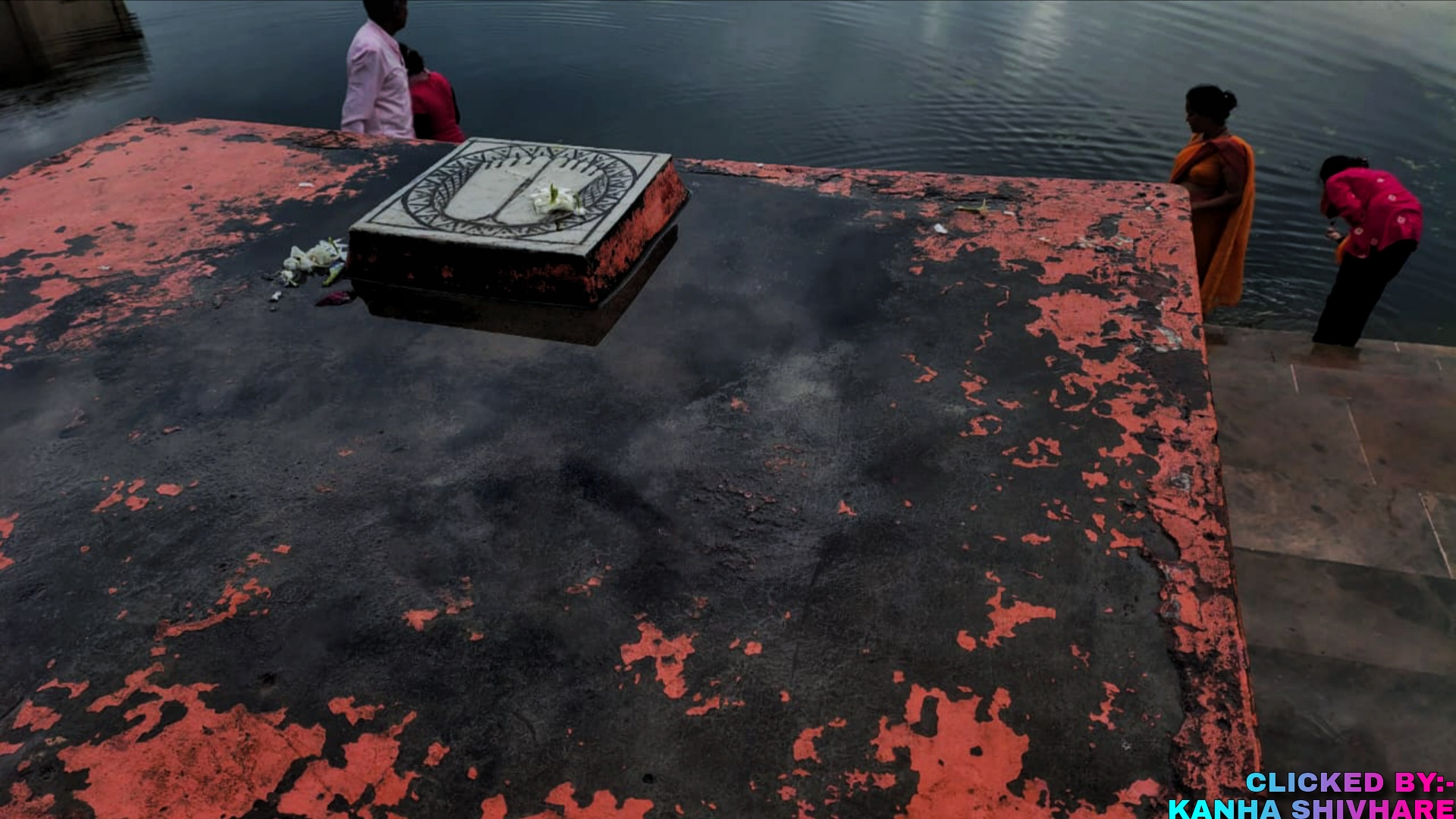
Ram Charan at Bharatkund, Nandigram

== See also ==
- Bharatkund railway station
