= Dhamhar =

- Village
- Location within India
- Coordinates: 26.4583°N 82.2230°E
- Country: India
- State: Uttar Pradesh
- District: Ayodhya district

Area
  - Total: 2.315 km^{2} (0.894 sq mi)
- Elevation: 93 m (305 ft)

Population (2011 census of India)
  - Total: 1,885
- Time zone: UTC+5:30 (IST)
- Postal code: 224205
- Vehicle registration: UP-42
- Website: uttarpradesh.gov.in

Dhamhar is a village in Bikapur tehsil, Ayodhya district in the Uttar Pradesh state of India.

Dhamhar is very close to Haiderganj town. Dhamhar is 43 km south of district headquarters Ayodhya city. It is the birthplace of freedom fighter Sarju Prasad Dubey.

The pincode of Dhamhar is 224205 and Dhamhar comes under Khapradih post office. Dhamhar is a part of Goshainganj Vidhan Sabha constituency and Ambedkar Nagar Lok Sabha constituency.

== Transport ==
=== Road ===
Dhamhar is well connected with nearby cities Ayodhya, Akbarpur, Sultanpur. And Dhamhar is also well connected with Chaure Bazar, Tarun, Bikapur, Bhiti and Goshainganj towns due to very close to Haiderganj town.

=== Railway ===
Chaure Bazar, Kurebhar, Goshainganj, Ayodhya Cantt and Ayodhya Junction are nearby railway stations.

=== Air ===
Ayodhya Airport is the nearest airport to Dhamhar.
