= Amaniganj =

Amaniganj may refer to:

- Amaniganj, Lucknow, a village in Lucknow, Uttar Pradesh
- Amaniganj, Ayodhya, a town in Ayodhya, Uttar Pradesh

See also

- Amanganj, a town in Madhya Pradesh
