= Gaddopur =

- Village
- Location in Ayodhya, Uttar Pradesh, India
- Coordinates: 26.758716°N 82.117546°E
- Country: India
- State: Uttar Pradesh
- District: Ayodhya
- Assembly Segment: Ayodhya

Government
  - Councilor: Ram Teerath

Population
  - Total: 8,000 (approximate)

Languages
  - Official: Hindi and English
- Time zone: UTC+5:30 (IST)
- PIN: 224001
- Telephone code: +91-05278

Gaddopur is an industrial area and village in the Ayodhya district of Uttar Pradesh, India, located near the historic city of Ayodhya. It falls under the jurisdiction of the Ayodhya Municipal Corporation and is part of the 10-Lala Lajpat Rai Nagar Ward, represented by corporator Ram Teerath (BJP).

== Demographics ==
Gaddopur is a typical village of Uttar Pradesh with a population of approximately 8,000. The residents belong to various communities, including Thakur, Brahmin, Yadav, Bania, Kumhar, and Dalit. The predominant groups in the village are Thakur, Brahmin, and Yadav.

Agriculture is the primary source of livelihood for the majority of households. A smaller proportion of residents, particularly from the Brahmin, Thakur and Yadav communities, are employed in Central and State government services.

== Transport ==
=== By road ===
Gaddopur lies on the East–West National Corridor along NH 27, which connects it to major cities such as Lucknow and Gorakhpur. The village is also well linked by road to nearby towns, markets, and regional centers, ensuring easy access for trade and travel.

=== By train ===
The nearest railway facility is the Ayodhya Cantt railway station, located approximately 2 km (1.2 mi) from the village. It serves as a major railhead connecting Gaddopur to several destinations across Uttar Pradesh and beyond.

=== By air ===
The closest airport is the Maharishi Valmiki International Airport, Ayodhya, situated around 2 km (1.2 mi) away. The airport provides domestic connectivity and is an important link for travelers to and from the region.

== Localities ==
Gaddopur comprises two main habitations — Bada Gaddopur and Chhota Gaddopur — which together form the core settlement of the village. These two habitations are closely interconnected, sharing common infrastructure, traditions, and community spaces. Despite being distinct in name, they function as a unified village, participating jointly in local governance, festivals, and economic activities under the Gaddopur Gram Sabha.

== Neighboring villages of Gaddopur ==
Several villages lie on the outskirts of Gaddopur, some of which fall under the Gaddopur Gram Sabha, while others do not. These surrounding settlements maintain close cultural and economic ties with Gaddopur, contributing to a shared regional identity.
