= Rani Bazar =

- Town
- Nickname: RBZ
- Country: India
- State: Uttar Pradesh
- District: Ayodhya
- City: Ayodhya

Government
  - Type: Nagar nigam Ayodhya
- Elevation: 1,746 m (5,728 ft)

Population (2011)
  - Total: 19,985
  - Rank: 32

Languages
  - Official: Hindi, Awadhi, English
- Time zone: UTC+5:30 (IST)
- PIN: 204001
- Vehicle registration: UP-42
- Sex ratio: 1000/992 ♂/♀
- Website: up.gov.in

Rani Bazar is a Town in Ayodhya city in the Indian state of Uttar Pradesh and is Subpost Office of Ayodhya.

== Demographics ==
As of 2011 India census, Rani Bazar had a population of 19,990. Males constitute 51% of the population and females 49%. Rani Bazar has an average literacy rate of 62%, higher than the national average of 59.5%: male literacy is 71%, and female literacy is 52%. In Rani Bazar, 17% of the population is under 6 years of age.

Religions in Rani Bazar
Religion	Percent
Hindus	90%
Muslims	0%
Jains	10%
Others†	0%
Distribution of religions †Includes Sikhs (0%), Buddhists (<0%).
