= Sarairasi =

- City
- Country: India
- State: Uttar Pradesh
- District: Ayodhya
- City: Ayodhya

Sarairasi is a Suburb located in Ayodhya city in the Indian state of Uttar Pradesh and is sub post office of Ayodhya.
