= Hastinganj =

- City
- Country: India
- State: Uttar Pradesh
- District: Ayodhya
- City: Ayodhya

Government
  - Type: Town Area
- Elevation: 1,346 m (4,416 ft)

Population (2011)
  - Total: 45,000
  - Rank: 13

Languages
  - Official: Hindi, Awadhi, English
- Time zone: UTC+5:30 (IST)
- PIN: 204001
- Vehicle registration: UP 42
- Sex ratio: 1000/992 ♂/♀
- Website: up.gov.in

Hastinganj is a town in Ayodhya city in the Indian state of Uttar Pradesh and is Subpost Office of Ayodhya.

== Demographics ==
As of 2011 India census, Hastinganj had a population of 45000. Males constitute 51% of the population and females 49%. Rikabganj has an average literacy rate of 62%, higher than the national average of 59.5%: male literacy is 71%, and female literacy is 52%. In Hastinganj, 17% of the population is under 6 years of age.

Religions in Hastinganj
Religion	Percent
Hindus	60%
Muslims	5%
Jains	5%
Others†	30%
Distribution of religions †Includes Sikhs (0%), Buddhists (<0%).
