= Masodha =

- Town
- Location in Uttar Pradesh, India Masodha (India)
- Coordinates: 26.77316°N 82.13982°E
- Country: India
- State: Uttar Pradesh
- Division: Ayodhya
- District: Ayodhya

Government
  - Type: Municipal Corporation
  - Body: Ayodhya Municipal Corporation
- Elevation: 1,346 m (4,416 ft)

Population (2011)
  - Total: 29,000
  - Rank: 13

Languages
  - Official: Hindi
  - Regional: Awadhi
- Time zone: UTC+5:30 (IST)
- PIN: 204001
- Vehicle registration: UP-42
- Sex ratio: 1000/992 ♂/♀
- Website: up.gov.in

Masodha is a town in Ayodhya district in the Indian state of Uttar Pradesh. It is a sub post office of Ayodhya and is close to Ayodhya city. Masodha is 6 km south of the district magistrate's office . Masodha is also a block in Ayodhya district.

== Transport ==
=== Road ===
Masodha is situated at Ayodhya - Sultanpur Road NH 330; that is why Masodha is well connected with nearby cities and towns. Ayodhya, Sultanpur and Akbarpur are the nearby cities. Bhadarsa, Bikapur, Goshainganj, Mehbubganj, Maya Bazar, Sohawal, Raunahi, Tarun, and Haiderganj are the nearby towns connected well with Masodha.

=== Railway ===
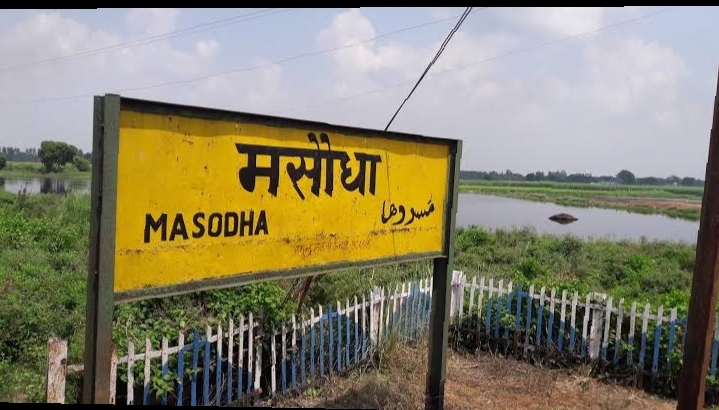
Masodha railway station

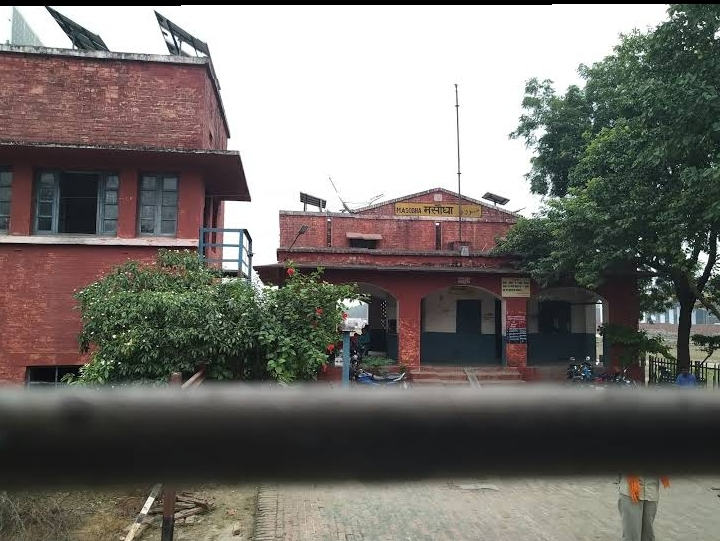
Masodha railway station

Masodha is the main railway station which is located in Masodha town itself. Ayodhya Cantt, Bharatkund, Ayodhya Junction, Goshainganj, Rudauli and Chaure Bazar are the nearby railway stations from Masodha.

=== Air ===
Ayodhya International Airport (under construction) is the nearest airport to Masodha.

== Demographics ==
As of the 2011 India census, Masodha had a population of 250. Males constitute 51% of the population and females 49%. Masodha has an average literacy rate of 62%, higher than the national average of 59.5%: male literacy is 71%, and female literacy is 52%. In Masodha, 17% of the population is under 6 years of age.

Religions in Masodha
Religion	Percent
Hindus	85%
Muslims	2%
Jains	13%
Others†	0%
Distribution of religions †Includes Sikhs (0%), Buddhists (<0%).
