= Vidisha (disambiguation) =

Vidisha (also Besnagar and Bhelsa) is a city in the Indian state of Madhya Pradesh.

Vidisha may also refer to:

- Vidisha district, for which the city of Vidisha is the administrative headquarters
- Vidisha Assembly constituency, Madhya Pradesh Legislative Assembly
- Vidisha Lok Sabha constituency, Parliament of India
- Vidisha Srivastava, Indian television actress
- Vidisha Baliyan, Indian model and tennis player

== See also ==
- Bhelsar, a village in Uttar Pradesh, India
- Bidisha, British-Indian broadcaster and journalist
