= Rudauli =

- Town
- Location in Uttar Pradesh, India
- Coordinates: 26.75°N 81.75°E
- Country: India
- State: Uttar Pradesh
- District: Ayodhya
- Elevation: 105 m (344 ft)

Population (2011)
  - Total: 43,091

Language
  - Official: Hindi
  - Additional official: Urdu
- Time zone: UTC+5:30 (IST)
- Postal code: 224120
- Vehicle registration: UP-42

Rudauli is a town, tehsil and a municipal board in Ayodhya district in the Indian state of Uttar Pradesh. Rudauli is 50 km west of the district headquarters Ayodhya.

== Geography ==
Rudauli is located at 26.75°N 81.75°E. It has an average elevation of 105 metres (344 feet).

== Demographics ==
Religion in Rudauli (2011)
Religion	Percent
Islam	60.00%
Hinduism	40.00%
Sikhism	0.00%
Christianity	0.00%
Buddhism	0.00%
Jainism	0.03%
Others	0.00%

As of 2001 India census, Rudauli had a population of 36,804. Males constitute 52% of the population and females 48%. Rudauli has an average literacy rate of 47%, lower than the national average of 59.5%: male literacy is 53%, and female literacy is 40%. In Rudauli, 17% of the population is under 6 years of age.

== Governance and politics ==
=== Civic administration ===
Rudauli is also a block in Ayodhya district in Uttar Pradesh. There is a police station in Rudauli.

== Transportation ==
=== Road ===
Rudauli is well connected with nearby cities of Ayodhya, Barabanki and Lucknow, and also with Sohawal, Mawai, Milkipur, Kumarganj, Goshainganj and Bikapur towns of Ayodhya district, Uttar Pradesh.

=== Railway ===
Rudauli, Ayodhya Cantt, Ayodhya Junction and barabanki junction are the nearest railway stations.

=== Air ===
Ayodhya International Airport is the nearest airport to the town.

== Notable people ==
- Majaz, Urdu poet and maternal uncle of Javed Akhtar
- Phoolchand Gupta, Hindi and Gujarati poet, writer and translator
- Parwana Rudaulvi, Urdu Poet, Journalist, Writer and Translator
- Hamida Salim, Urdu poet, teacher,
