= Phoolchand Gupta =

Indian writer

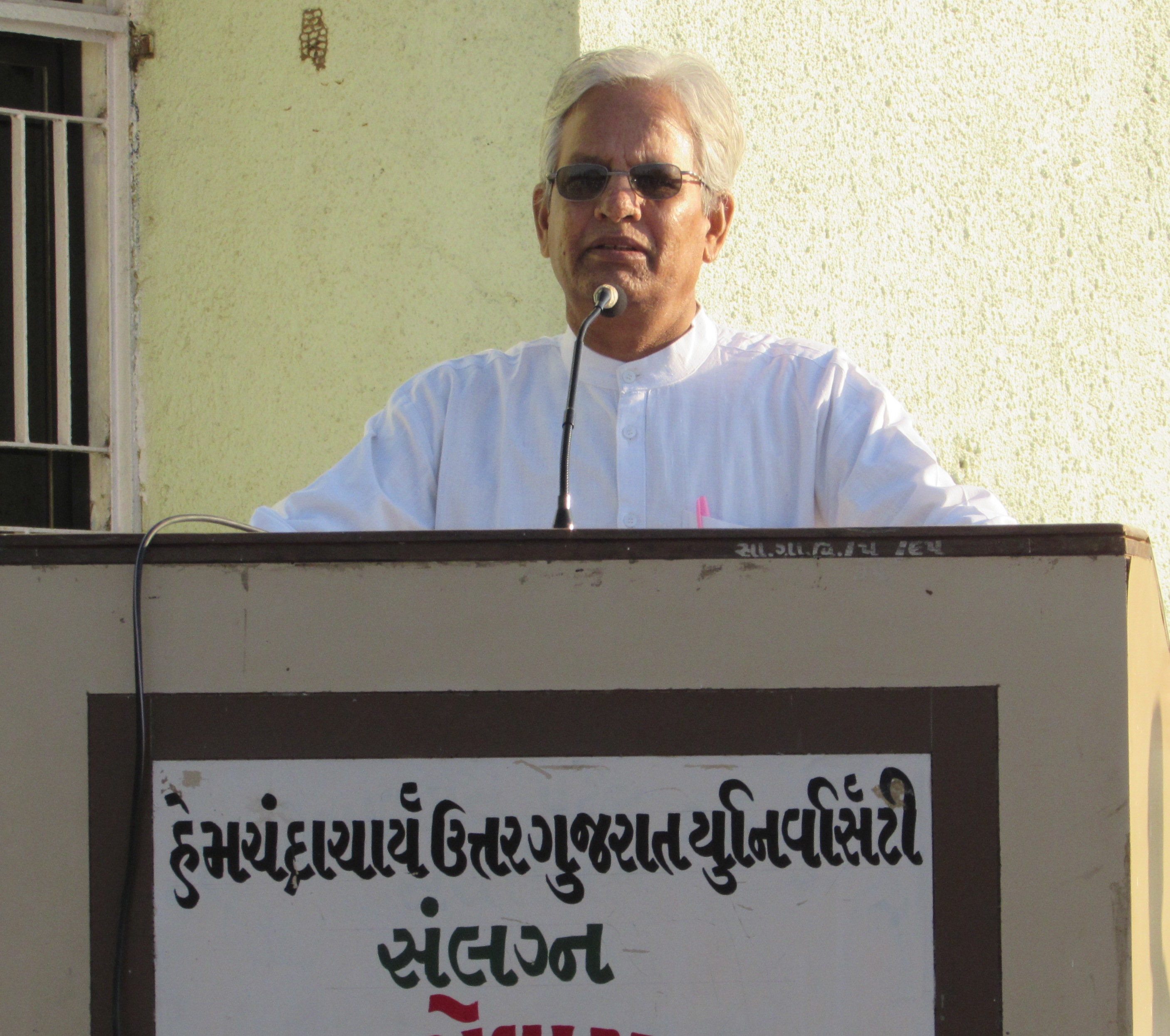
- Gupta at Sabargram Mahavidyalay, Prantij in 2016
- Born: Phoolchand Jagatnarayan Gupta; 30 October 1958 (age 67); Amraigaon, Uttar Pradesh, India
- Education: Gujarat University; Veer Narmad South Gujarat University
- Occupations: Poet, writer, translator
- Spouse: Shakun Gupta (m. 1982)
- Children: 3
- Writing career
- Language: Gujarati, Hindi
- Years active: 1973 - present
- Genres: Ghazal, free verse, short story
- Notable awards: Safdar Hashmi Prize (2000)
- Movement: Dalit literature in Gujarati

Phoolchand Gupta (born 30 October 1958) is an Indian Hindi and Gujarati language poet, writer and translator. He hails from Himmatnagar, Gujarat, India. He made significant contributions to the Gujarati Dalit literature. Hindi Sahitya Akademi of state awarded him in 2013 for his book Khwabkhwahon Ki Sadi Hai. He won the Shafdar Hashmi Prize (2000) for his book Isi Mahol Mein.

== Early life ==
Phoolchand Gupta was born to his parents, Jagatnarayan and Savitridevi, on 30 October 1958 at Amraigaon, a village in Rudauli city of Ayodhya district (then Barabanki district) in the Indian state of Uttar Pradesh. He completed his primary education from Amraigaon Primary School in 1969. In 1970, he came to Ahmedabad and completed his schooling (Old S.S.C.) from Janta Hindi High School, Naroda in 1974. He got his Bachelor of Commerce in 1978 from Sardar Vallabhbhai Patel Commerce Mahavidyalay, Ahmedabad.

In 1982, he joined H. K. Arts College, Ahmedabad and got his Bachelor of Arts in 1985 in English literature. He did his Master of Arts in 1987 from School of Languages of Gujarat University. In the same year, he did Postgraduate diploma in Journalism from Bhavan's Center, Ahmedabad. Again in 1993, he obtained Master of Arts in Hindi literature from Gujarat University. Under the guidance of Uttambhai Patel, he received a Ph.D. for his dissertation Ikkisvi Sadi Ke Pratham Dashak Ke Hindi Upanyas Me Dalit, Nari Evam Vargiya Chetna (lit. 'Dalit, woman and class consciousness in Hindi novels of the first decade of 21st century') in 2013 from Veer Narmad South Gujarat University.

== Career ==
Gupta started his career in 1980 as a clerk at a private transport company at Ahmedabad. From 1987 to 1988, he served as a journalist at Young India, a daily. In 1989, he joined Sabargram Vidyapith, Sonasan in Prantij as a professor of English literature.

He started writing poems during his school days. His first poem was published in 1973. Subsequently, his writings were published in Gujarati and Hindi literary magazines including Hans, Samkaleen Bharatiya Sahitya, English Literature, Nirikshak, Navneet Samarpan and Kumar. He started writing in Gujarati after moving to Prantij.

== Works ==
He has written poems, short stories and essays in Hindi and Gujarati. His literary creation is influenced by Marxism. The theme of his ghazals has been political, social and economic inequalities and the erosion of human values.

Isi Mahol Me, his first collection of poems in Hindi, was published in 1997, followed by Hey Ram (2002). Saansat Me Hai Kabootar (2003), Koi Nahi Sunata Aag Ke Sansmaran (2006), Rakh Ka Dher (2010), Kot Ki Jaib Se Jhankati Prithvi (2012), Dinu Aur Kauvve (2012), (Note: This collection (Dinu Aur Kauvve) was first published in 1994 in the poetry anthology magazine "Aakhari Dashak ki Lambi Kavitayein" (lit. "Long Poems of the Last Decade") edited by Ramnika Gupta and Nageshwar Lal.) Jharne Ki Tarah (2013), Phool Aur Titli (2014), Timir ka Durg (2021) and Yah Kaalkhand Upajaau hai (2023) are his collections of poetry.

Khwabkhwaho Ki Sadi Hai (2009) and Aarzoo-E-Phoolchand (2015) are his collections of Gazals. Prayaschit Nahi Pratishodh is his story collection. Pratham Dashak ke Hindi Upanyas Aur Mukti Chetna (2016) is a collection of literary criticism.

Gandhi Aantarman (2008, Gujarati), Mahagatha (2011) and GEMS on Grass Tips (2018, poems in prose) are his other literary collections.

Gupta has translated several literary works including Gujarati language stories, poems, interviews, plays and critical essays. He translated Raghuvir Chaudhary's Gujarati novels: Lagani, Ichhawar Uparwas, Sahvas and Antarvas into Hindi. He also translated Harish Mangalam's Gujarati story collection Talab.

== Recognition ==
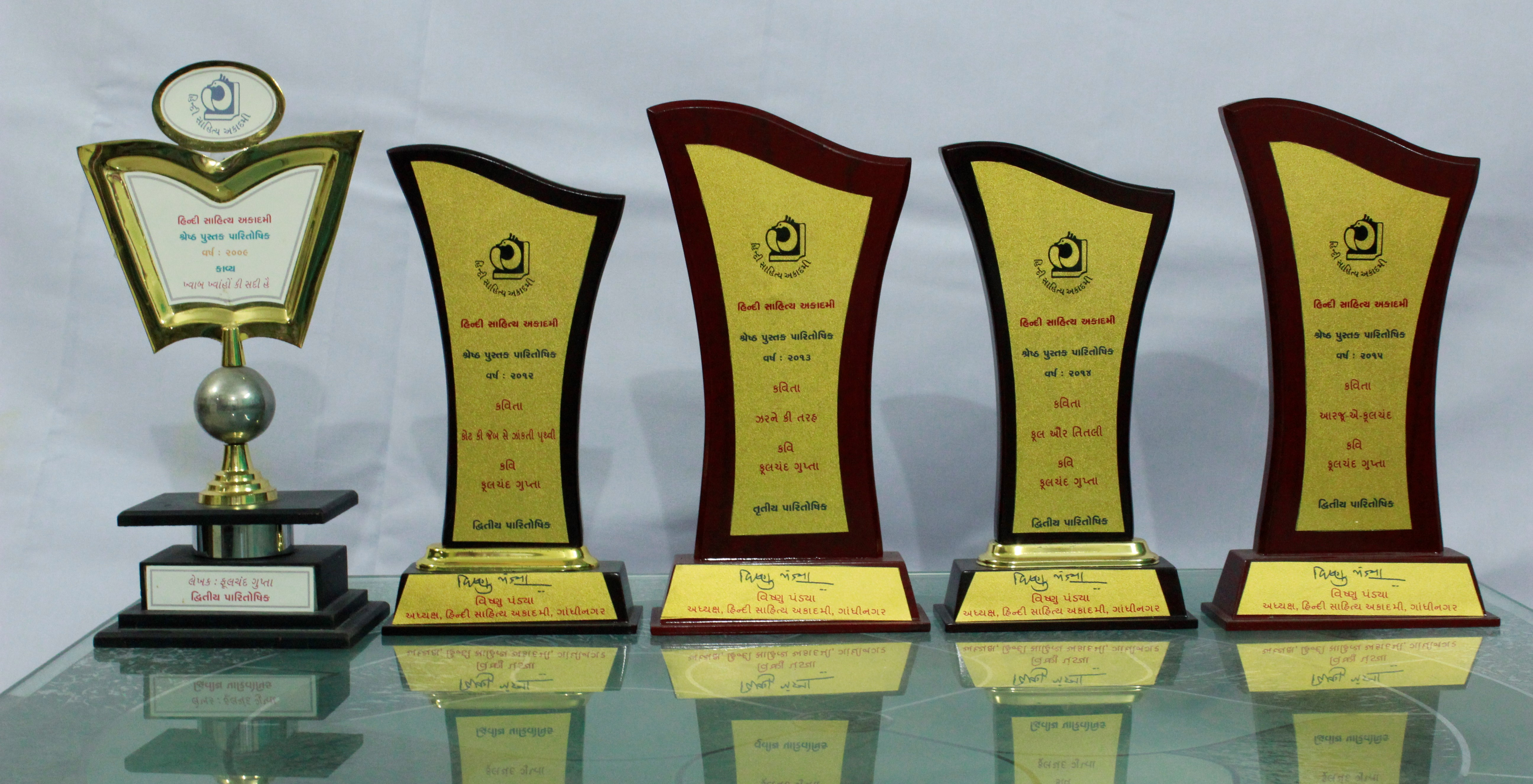
Hindi Sahitya Akademi Awards to Phoolchand Gupta by Gujarat Sahitya Akademi

Gupta's contributions to the field of Hindi literature have been recognised and he has received many literary awards. He won Shafdar Hashmi Puraskar in 2000 for his book Isi Mahol Me (1997). He has been awarded the "Gujarat Hindi Sahitya Akademi Award" by the Gujarat Sahitya Akademi in 2009 for his book Khabgahon Ki Sadi Ha, in 2012 for Kot ki Jebse Jhankti Prithvi, in 2013 for Jharne Ki Taraha, in 2014 for Phool Aur Titl and in 2015 for Arzoo-e-Phoolchand. He has received Aravali Shikhar Sanman and Antarrashtriya Tathagat Sanman.

== Family ==
He married Shakun Gupta in 1982 and they have a daughter, Pallavi, and two sons, Siddhartha and Ruchir. He lives in Himatnagar.

== See also ==
- List of Gujarati-language writers
