= Nandigram (disambiguation) =

Nandigram is a census town in the Nandigram I Community Development Block of the Haldia subdivision in the Purba Medinipur district of the Indian state of West Bengal.

Nandigram may also refer to:

- Nandigram I, a community development block in Haldia subdivision of Purba Medinipur, West Bengal, India
- Nandigram II, a community development block in Haldia subdivision of Purba Medinipur, West Bengal, India
- Nandigram (Vidhan Sabha constituency), an assembly constituency in Purba Medinipur, West Bengal, India
- Nandigram violence, violent protests against government land acquisition in West Bengal, India in 2007
- Nandigram Express, a railway service in India
- Nandigram Upazila, an upazila of Bogra District in the Division of Rajshahi, Bangladesh
- Nandigram (Bharat Kund), a village in Sohawal tehsil, Uttar Pradesh, India; mentioned in the Ramayana as the residence of Rama's brother Bharata
- Nandigrama, a place in western India known for a school of 13th-18th century astronomer-mathematicians
