= Parwana =

Parwana may refer to:

- Parwana (title), Seljuk court title
- Mu'in al-Din Parwana, 13th-century Seljuk statesman in Anatolia
- Parwana Rudaulvi, Indian writer
- Parwana (1947 film), a 1947 Hindi drama film
- Parwana (1971 film), a 1971 Bollywood thriller film directed by Jyoti Swaroop
- Parwana (2003 film), a 2003 Bollywood drama film directed by Deepak Bahry
