= Taalgaon =

Taalgaon, also spelled Talgaon, is a village in Fatehpur mandal, Barabanki district, Uttar Pradesh, India. It is 34 kilometres (21 mi) from its district main city at Barabanki and 44 kilometres (27 mi) from the state capital of Lucknow.

Taalgaon Pin Code is 225407 and Post office name is Meermau, Rudauli.
