= Akhlaqur Rahman Kidwai =

Indian politician (1921–2016)

Akhlaq Ur Rehman Kidwai
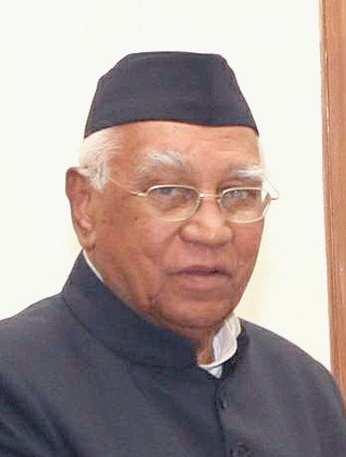
- Kidwai in February 2009

13th Governor of Haryana
- In office 7 July 2004 – 27 July 2009
- Chief Minister: Om Prakash Chautala; Bhupinder Singh Hooda
- Preceded by: O.P. Verma
- Succeeded by: Jagannath Pahadia

Governor of Rajasthan
- Additional charge
- In office 21 June 2007 – 6 September 2007
- Chief Minister: Vasundhara Raje
- Preceded by: Pratibha Patil
- Succeeded by: Shilendra Kumar Singh

15th Governor of West Bengal
- In office 27 April 1998 – 18 May 1999
- Chief Minister: Jyoti Basu
- Preceded by: K. V. Raghunatha Reddy
- Succeeded by: Shyamal Kumar Sen

10th Governor of Bihar
- In office 14 August 1993 – 26 April 1998
- Chief Minister: Lalu Prasad Yadav; Rabri Devi
- Preceded by: Mohammad Shafi Qureshi
- Succeeded by: Sunder Singh Bhandari
- In office 20 September 1979 – 15 March 1985
- Chief Minister: Ram Sunder Das; Jagannath Mishra; Chandrashekhar Singh; Bindeshwari Dubey
- Preceded by: Jagannath Kaushal
- Succeeded by: Pendekanti Venkatasubbaiah

Personal details
- Born: 1 July 1921 Baragaon, Barabanki, United Provinces, British India (now in Uttar Pradesh, India)
- Died: 24 August 2016 (aged 95) New Delhi, India
- Spouse: Jamila Kidwai (deceased)
- Children: 6
- Education: Jamia Millia Islamia; University of Illinois; Cornell University
- Religion: Sunni Islam

Akhlaq Ur Rehman Kidwai (1 July 1921 – 24 August 2016) was an Indian chemist and politician. He served as Governor of the states of Bihar, West Bengal and Haryana. Also, he worked as Governor (as an additional charge) of the state of Rajasthan. He was a member of the Rajya Sabha, the upper house of the Indian parliament, from 1999 to 2004. He was awarded the Padma Vibhushan, India's second highest civilian award.

== Early life and education ==
He was born in 1921 in Baragaon village of Barabanki district in Uttar Pradesh to father, late Ashfaqur Rehman Kidwai and mother, late Nasim-un-nisa. He was married to the late Jamila Kidwai, and had six children, two sons and four daughters.

He completed his schooling at Sherwood College, Nainital, pursued BA at Jamia Millia Islamia University, 1940, M.Sc. at University of Illinois, 1948 and PhD at Cornell University, 1950.

== Political and public career ==
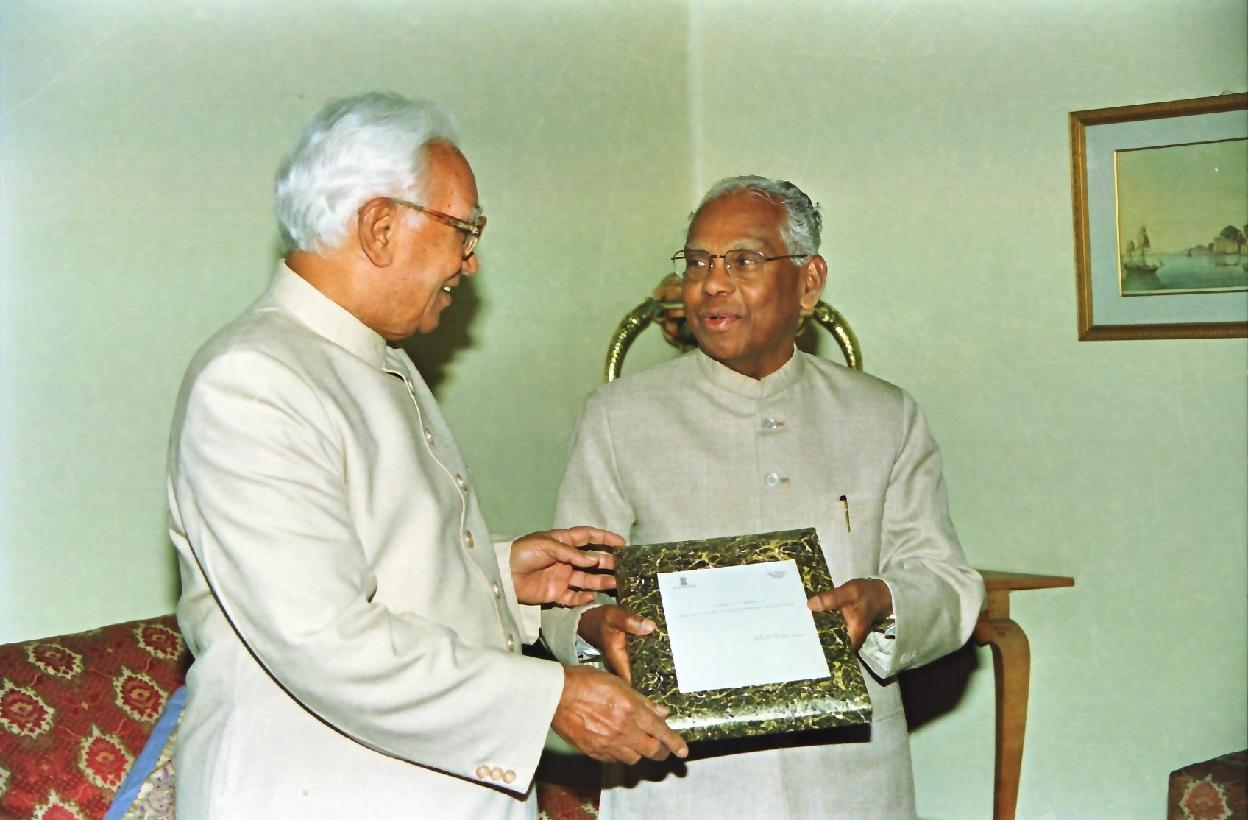
The Governor of West Bengal, Shri Akhlaqur Rahman Kidwai calling on the President of India, Shri K. R. Narayanan at Kolkata

Dr. Kidwai started his professional career as a professor and head of Department of Chemistry and dean of Faculty of Science at Aligarh Muslim University, India. Kidwai then went on to become the chairman of Union Public Service Commission (UPSC), Government of India from 1974 to 1977. He was Governor of Bihar twice, from 1979 to 1985 and 1993 to 1998 and Governor of West Bengal from 1998 to 1999.

In addition, he was chancellor of Aligarh Muslim University, Aligarh, from 1983 to 1991 and was also the director of the Jammu & Kashmir Bank.

Kidwai was a member of the Rajya Sabha from January 1999 to July 2004. He was the Governor of Haryana from 7 July 2004 to 27 July 2009. After Pratibha Patil's resignation as Governor of Rajasthan in June 2007, he was asked to take over that position as well, serving as Governor of the state until S. K. Singh took office on 6 September 2007.

In addition to his political career, he was a champion for promoting research and development and elevating the status of women by education and self-reliance. He served as the chairman of the Institute of Marketing and Management, New Delhi and president of Vocational Education Society for Women.

Kidwai served as a member of the following national committees, organizations and institutions:

- National Committee on Science and Technology, 1968–75.
- Perspective Science and Technology Plan Committee of the Department of Science and Technology and the Planning Commission.
- Council and the Governing Body of Indian Council of Agricultural Research (ICAR) 1970–73.
- Board of Council of Scientific and Industrial Research (CSIR) and Governing Bodies of Central Drug Research Institute, Lucknow and Central Institute of Chemical Technology, Hyderabad.
- Regional Imbalances Enquiry Commission, Jammu and Kashmir State, 1979.
- State Planning Board and Heavy Industries Plan Committees, Government of Uttar Pradesh.
- University Grants Commission (UGC) and Chairman of the Central Universities Review Committee, 1985–86.
- Central Advisory Board of Education.
- Central Council of Indian Institutes of Technology (IITs).
- Committee on New Education Policy, 1986 and Chairman of its Sub-Committee on Non-Formal Methods of Education.
- Member and Patron Delhi Public School Society (1968-continued).
- Honorary Fellow of the Institution of Engineers, India.
- Chairman, Review Committee on Unani Medicine, Ministry of Health, Government of India.
- Chairman, Selection Board of Scientists Pool (1968–79).
- Chairman of the Board of Assessment of Educational and Technical Qualification for Employment, Ministry of Education, Government of India (1967–79).
- The American, British and Indian Chemical Societies.
- American Association for the Advancement of Science.

== Awards and honors ==
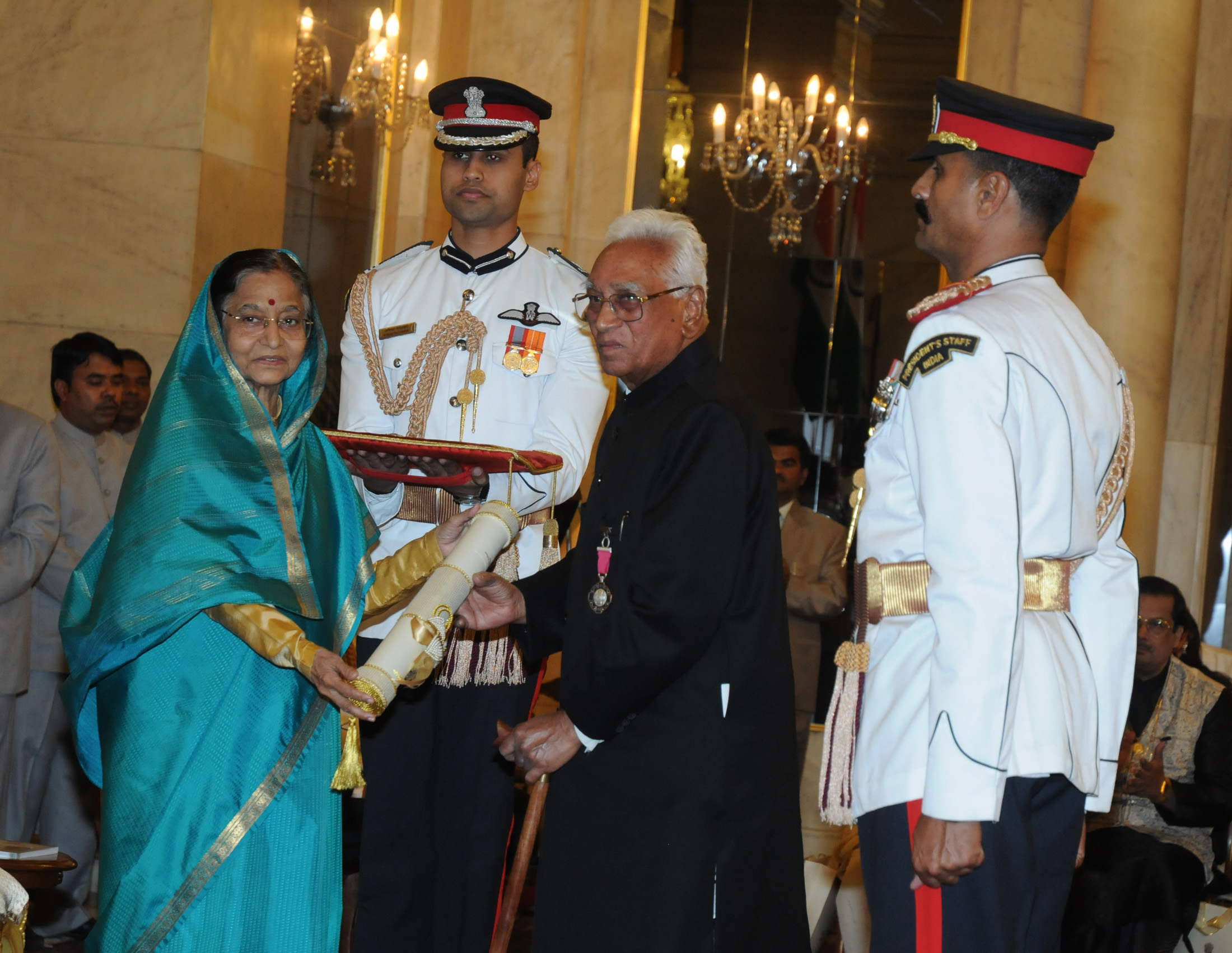
The President, Pratibha Patil, presenting the Padma Vibhushan award to Dr. Akhlaqur Rahman Kidwai, at an Investiture Ceremony, at Rashtrapati Bhavan, in New Delhi on March 24, 2011

On January 25, 2011, Kidwai was awarded the Padma Vibhushan, India's second highest civilian award. The award was for his contribution towards Public Affairs.

== Death ==
He died on August 24, 2016, in New Delhi after a long illness, aged 95. He was buried at the Jamia Millia Islamia graveyard.

Preceded by -	Union Deputy Minister, Railways; 1974 – 1976	Succeeded by -
Preceded by -	Union Deputy Minister, Commerce; 1976 – 1977	Succeeded by -
Preceded by Justice K.B.N. Singh (acting)	Governor of Bihar; 1979 – 1985	Succeeded by P. Venkatasubbaiah
Preceded by Mohammad Shafi Qureshi	Governor of Bihar; 1993 – 1998	Succeeded by Sunder Singh Bhandari
