= Milkipur =

- Town
- Map of Milkipur

- Location in Uttar Pradesh, India
- Coordinates: 26.594375°N 81.909554°E
- Country: India
- State: Uttar Pradesh
- District: Ayodhya

Government
  - Legislator: Chandrabhanu Paswan
- Elevation: 94 m (308 ft)

Population (2011)
  - Total: 2,629

Languages
  - Official: Hindi
- Time zone: UTC+5:30 (IST)
- PIN: 224153
- Vehicle registration: UP-42
- Website: ayodhya.nic.in

Milkipur is a town and tehsil in Ayodhya district in the Indian state of Uttar Pradesh. Milkipur is 32 km south of district headquarters Ayodhya city. District Ayodhya consists of 11 blocks and Milkipur is a block in Ayodhya, Uttar Pradesh.

Acharya Narendra Deva University of Agriculture and Technology is situated at Kumarganj (a town situated at a distance of about 10 km, south from Milkipur). Tehsil headquarters and Police station of Milkipur tehsil are situated at Inayatnagar, 5 kilometers North-East from Milkipur centre.

== History ==
The town Milkipur and its name originated from the people of Milki Caste who once lived here.

== Geography ==
Milkipur is located at 26.594375°N 81.909554°E. It has an average elevation of 94 metres (311feet). The Milkipur Constituency is surrounded by Gomti and Tamsa rivers.

== Demographics ==
As of 2001 India census, Milkipur had a population of 1,764. Males constitute 52% of the population and females 48%. Milkipur has an average literacy rate of 52%, lower than the national average of 59.5%; with male literacy of 63% and female literacy of 39%. 17% of the population is under 6 years of age.

== Climate ==
Milkipur has a warm humid subtropical climate with cool, dry winters from December to February and dry, hot summers from March to July. The rainy season is from mid-June to mid-September, when Milkipur gets an average rainfall of 1010 mm (40 in) mostly from the south-west monsoon winds. In winter the maximum temperature is around 25 degrees Celsius and the minimum is in the 2 to 3 degrees Celsius range. Fog is quite common from late December to late January. Summers are very hot with temperatures ranging from 35 to 45 degree Celsius.

Climate data for Ayodhya
Month	Jan	Feb	Mar	Apr	May	Jun	Jul	Aug	Sep	Oct	Nov	Dec	Year
Record high °C (°F)	28 (82)	32 (90)	41 (106)	44 (111)	46 (115)	48 (118)	41 (106)	38 (100)	38 (100)	37 (99)	33 (91)	28 (82)	69 (156)
Mean daily maximum °C (°F)	18 (64)	26 (79)	32 (90)	36 (97)	40 (104)	41 (106)	36 (97)	34 (93)	35 (95)	32 (90)	26 (79)	20 (68)	33 (91)
Mean daily minimum °C (°F)	6 (43)	12 (54)	16 (61)	22 (72)	27 (81)	29 (84)	27 (81)	26 (79)	25 (77)	20 (68)	12 (54)	7 (45)	15 (59)
Record low °C (°F)	−3 (27)	7 (45)	11 (52)	15 (59)	20 (68)	22 (72)	20 (68)	18 (64)	21 (70)	15 (59)	9 (48)	0.5 (32.9)	−3 (27)
Average precipitation mm (inches)	23 (0.9)	16 (0.6)	9 (0.4)	5 (0.2)	6 (0.2)	68 (2.7)	201 (7.9)	286 (11.3)	202 (8.0)	43 (1.7)	7 (0.3)	8 (0.3)	881 (34.7)

== Festivals ==
All major Festivals Like Holi, Deepawali, Ramnavmi, Eid, Vijayadashami etc. are celebrated with full zeal and joy.

== Transport ==
=== Air ===
Ayodhya International Airport (Ayodhya) (40 km) and Lucknow airport (115 km) are the nearby airports from Milkipur town.

=== Road ===
Milkipur is situated at National Highway 330A and it has good road connectivity with Lucknow (115 km), Ayodhya (32 km), Rudauli (23 km) and Jagdishpur (30 km).

=== Railway ===
Rudauli, Ayodhya Cantt, Ayodhya Junction, Goshainganj and Chaure Bazar are the nearby railway stations from Milkipur.

== Education ==
=== Acharya Narendra Deva University Of Agriculture and Technology ===
Acharya Narendra Deva University of Agriculture and Technology is an agricultural university at Ayodhya district in the Indian state of Uttar Pradesh. It is in the small town of Milkipur Constituency known as Kumarganj.

On 15 January 1974 the foundation stone of Narendra Dev University of Agriculture & Technology was led by the prime minister of India Indira Gandhi at Masodha near Ayodhya. Shri Laxmi narain Rai, APCS officer of Agriculture Department, government of UP, was deputed as officer on special duty. After a few month, he was succeeded by Dr. A.S. Srivastava he took over in October, 1974. Some speed work was done by his team. A new development took place during 1975 and the government of UP decided to locate the main campus of the university in Milkipur at kumarganj, Ayodhya district instead of Masodha. Shri A.D. Pandey, IAS officer (retired) was appointed the first vice chancellor of the university on 10 October 1975. The university started functioning in a borrowed building of Gram Swavlambi Vidyalaya Acharya Nagar Naka Ayodhya. DR. R.P.Chandola joined as the first Registrar of the university in November 1975. A committee was constituted for the site selection of Academy administrative and residential blocks of the university at Kumarganj. The committee submitted its report on 22 January 1976. On 10 July 1976 the paddy research station located at, Masodha, Gahghara Ghat and ECF and NDS schemes were transferred to the university by the government and U.P. institute Agril. science Kanpur which formed the nucleus of the research university. Dr.Kirti Singh took over the first Dean of the Agril. faculty on 12 February 1977 which approved creation of 20 departments in the college of agriculture.

The Mahamaya college of Agriculture Engineering and Technology(MCAET) a constituent college of N.D. university of Agriculture and Technology, Kumarganj, Ayodhya was established at Ambedkar Nagar by upgrading the department of agriculture of the college of agriculture to cater the needs of development of engineering and Technology to suit the condition of the farmers of Eastern Uttar Pradesh characterised by problems of user lands, water looked poorly drained soils scant power supply, small holdings, low purchasing power and poor rural infrastructure. Former Prime Minister of India Smt. Indira Gandhi Laid Foundation stone of NDUAT on 10 October 1975 Narendra Deva University of Agriculture and Technology, Narendra Nagar (Kumarganj), named after a great national leader, educationist, philosopher and great socialist, Achraya Narendra Deva whose ideals constitute a great national heritage and source of inspiration in the national quest for a progressive economy free from the fear and exploitation.

== Media ==
=== Press ===
Milkipur is fully covered by prominent Hindi newspapers like Dainik jagran, Amar Ujala, Hindustan, Jan Morcha etc.

=== Radio ===
The Following Radio Stations Can be listened in Milkipur.

- All India Radio
- FM Ayodhya 101.9 MHz
- Radio City Lucknow 91.1 MHz
- Radio Mirchi Lucknow 98.3 MHz
- FM Rainbow Lucknow 100.7 MHz
- FM RADIO Kumarganj

=== Internet ===
Major Broadband Internet providers in Milkipur are BSNL, Reliance Jio, Bharti Airtel, Vodafone and Idea.
