= Bharatkund railway station =

Station in Uttar Pradesh, India

Bharatkund
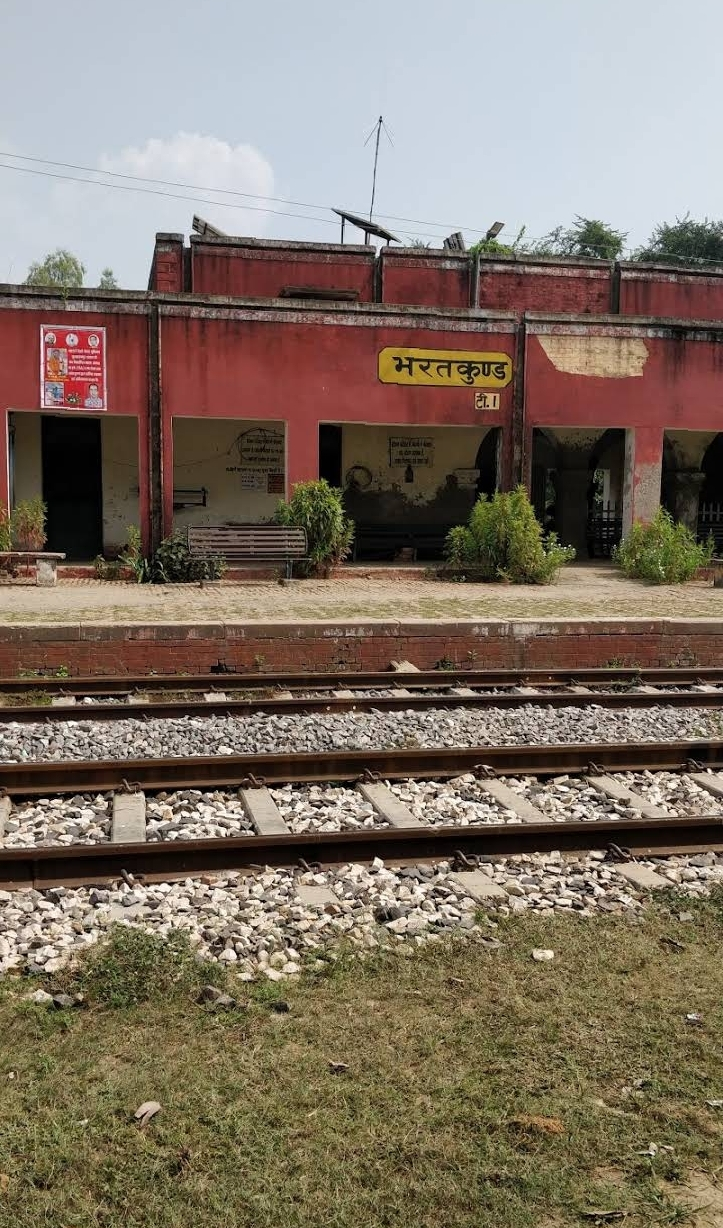
- Bharatkund railway station, Ayodhya

General information
- Location: Station Road, Bharatkund, Ayodhya district, Uttar Pradesh; India
- Coordinates: 26.6356°N 82.1267°E
- System: Express train & Passenger train station
- Owner: Indian Railways
- Line: Prayagraj–Ayodhya line
- Platforms: 02
- Tracks: 01

Construction
- Structure type: Standard on-ground station
- Parking: Yes
- Cycle facilities: Available

Other information
- Station code: BTKD
- Fare zone: Northern Railway zone

History
- Opened: 20th century

Services
Location

Bharatkund railway station is one of the railway station in the Ayodhya district of Indian state of Uttar Pradesh.

It takes 20 minutes to travel from Ayodhya city to Bharatkund railway station. Approximate driving distance between Ayodhya and Bharatkund railway station is 17 km (11 mi). Travel time refers to the time taken if the distance is covered by a car.
