= Kumarganj, Ayodhya =

Kumarganj
- Town
- Location in Uttar Pradesh, India Kumarganj (India)
- Coordinates: 26.553010°N 81.842512°E
- Country: India
- State: Uttar Pradesh
- Division: Ayodhya
- District: Ayodhya

Area
  - Total: 3.5 km^{2} (1.4 sq mi)
- Elevation: 98 m (322 ft)

Language
  - Official: Hindi
  - Additional official: Urdu
- Time zone: UTC+5:30 (IST)
- PIN: 224229
- Vehicle registration: UP-42
- Website: up.gov.in

Kumarganj is a university town in the Ayodhya district in the state of Uttar Pradesh in India. Kumarganj is 37 km south of district headquarters Ayodhya city.

== Government and politics ==
=== Civic administration ===
There is a police station in Kumarganj.

== Transport ==
Road

Kumarganj has good connectivity by road to Raebareli, Ayodhya, Lucknow, Kanpur, Varanasi and Prayagraj city.

Railways

The nearest railway station is Nihalgarh Railway Station (25 km), Ayodhya Cantt (41 km) and Ayodhya junction (47 km).

Air

The nearest airport is Ayodhya International Airport 40 km north, Lucknow Airport 128 km, Varanasi Airport 200 km.

== Education ==
- Acharya Narendra Deva University of Agriculture and Technology
