= Badagoan =

- Town
- Location in Madhya Pradesh, India Badagoan (India)
- Coordinates: 23°43′59″N 76°18′25″E
- Country: India
- State: Madhya Pradesh
- District: Shajapur

Population (2001)
  - Total: 6,566

Languages
  - Official: Hindi
- Time zone: UTC+5:30 (IST)
- ISO 3166 code: IN-MP
- Vehicle registration: MP

Badagoan is a town and a nagar panchayat in Shajapur district in the state of Madhya Pradesh, India.

== Demographics ==
As of 2001 India census, Badagoan had a population of 6,566. Males constitute 52% of the population and females 48%. Badagoan has a literacy rate of 52%, lower than the national average of 59.5%; with 59% of the males and 31% of females literate. 17% of the population is under 6 years of age.
