= Acharya Narendra Deva University of Agriculture and Technology =

University in Kumarganj, Uttar Pradesh India

- Type: State university
- Established: 10 October 1975 (50 years ago)
- Accreditation: NAAC A++
- Affiliations: UGC
- Chancellor: Governor of Uttar Pradesh
- Vice-Chancellor: Dr. Gyanendra Pratap Singh
- Location: Kumarganj, Ayodhya, Uttar Pradesh, India; 26.5356°N 81.8352°E
- Campus: Rural, 477 Acres
- Website: www.nduat.org

Acharya Narendra Deva University of Agriculture and Technology (ANDUaT), is a university located in Kumarganj, Ayodhya district in the Indian state of Uttar Pradesh. It was established in 1975 and named after the politician and educator Narendra Deva, who served as vice chancellor of the University of Lucknow and Banaras Hindu University. It has constituent colleges in Ambedkar Nagar district and Azamgarh district.

== History ==
The foundation stone of was laid on 15 January 1974, by Prime Minister Indira Gandhi at Masodha near Faizabad. Laxmi Narain Rai was the first officer on special duty, succeeded by A.S. Srivastava in October 1974 and by the first vice-chancellor, A.D. Pandey in October 1975. In the same year the government of Uttar Pradesh decided that the main campus of the university would be established at Kumarganj, Ayodhya instead of Masodha. The university started functioning in a borrowed building of Gram Swalabi Vidyalaya Acharya Nagar, Naka, Faizabad.

The Mahamaya College of Agriculture Engineering and Technology was established in 2002 at Ambedkar Nagar by upgrading the department of Agriculture Engineering in the College of Agriculture.

== Constituent colleges ==
The university includes the following constituent colleges:

- Mahamaya College of Agricultural Engineering and Technology, Akbarpur, Ambedkar Nagar
- College of Agriculture, Kumarganj, Ayodhya
- College of Fisheries, Kumarganj, Ayodhya
- College of Community Science, Kumarganj, Ayodhya
- College of Horticulture and Forestry, Kumarganj, Ayodhya
- College of Veterinary Science & Animal Husbandry, Kumarganj, Ayodhya
- College of Agriculture, Azamgarh
- College of Agriculture, Gonda
