= Baragaon, Mainpuri =

Village in Uttar Pradesh, India

Baragaon
- Village
- Location in Uttar Pradesh, India
- Coordinates: 27.1652897°N 78.9370593°E
- Country: India
- State: Uttar Pradesh
- District: Mainpuri
- Tehsil: Mainpuri

Area
  - Total: 6.462 km^{2} (2.495 sq mi)

Population (2011)
  - Total: 2,788
  - Density: 431.4/km^{2} (1,117/sq mi)
- Time zone: UTC+5:30 (IST)

Baragaon (Baṛāgāon) is a village in Mainpuri block of Mainpuri district, Uttar Pradesh, India. As of 2011, it had a population of 2,788, in 442 households.

== Demographics ==
As of 2011, Baragaon had a population of 2,788, in 442 households. This population was 53.4% male (1,490) and 46.6% female (1,298). The 0-6 age group numbered 406 (228 male and 178 female), or 14.6% of the total population. 510 residents were members of Scheduled Castes, or 18.3% of the total.

The 1981 census recorded Baragaon as having a population of 1,518 people, in 237 households.

The 1961 census recorded Baragaon (as "Barangaon") as comprising 10 hamlets, with a total population of 1,009 people (529 male and 400 female), in 167 households and 147 physical houses. The area of the village was given as 1,595 acres.

== Infrastructure ==
As of 2011, Baragaon had 1 primary school; it did not have any healthcare facilities. Drinking water was provided by tap, well, hand pump, and tube well; there were no public toilets. The village had a post office and public library, as well as at least some access to electricity for all purposes. Streets were made of kachcha materials.
