= Parwana Rudaulvi =

Indian writer and journalist (1933–2008)

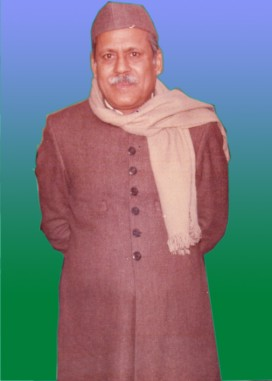
Parwana Rudaulvi11-11-1933 - 12-04-2008

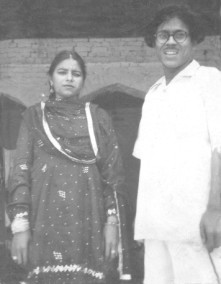
Parwana Rudaulvi with his wife Umm-e-Habiba

Syed Meesam Tammarسید میسم تمار (11 November 1933 – 12 April 2008), best known as Parwana Rudaulviپروانہ ردولوی, was an Indian Urdu-language writer and journalist. He was born in Rudauli, which was then in Barabanki district and is now in Faizabad. He is maternal grandfather of Fazayal Shabbir, author of the book "City Under Curfew and other stories"

== Career ==
- 1950 Reporter in U. P. Assembly
- 1951 Nai Dunya, Delhi
- 1955 Launched own Urdu daily SIYASAT-E-NAU from Kanpur. Discontinued its publication in 1957
- 1957 Joined the Daily Hindustan Bombay
- 1959 Rejoined the daily NAI DUNIYA, as its Executive Editor
- 1960 Worked in The Daily Dawat, Delhi
- 1963 Worked in The Daily Mulk-O-Millat, Delhi
- 1968 Worked with Daily Qaaed of Lucknow, as its Resident Editor
- 1969 Joined the Daily Pratap, New Delhi. Worked there for about 22 years (until 1990) in many important positions, including head of the magazine section
- 1990 Executive Editor of the leading Urdu Daily Awam, New Delhi
- 1997 Executive Editor of Daily Sab-ka-Akhbar, New Delhi

== Roles ==
- President of Hum Hindustani, an organisation working for communal harmony among all sections of society.
- General Secretary, Delhi Writers Forum, working for the welfare of writers and journalists.
- Member of the Governing Council of Urdu Academy, Delhi.
- Urdu News bulletin Compiler and News Reader, Radio Kashmir, Srinagar (Delhi Camp).
- Commentator, All India Radio NSD & ESD.
- Editor, News & Views (Urdu Feature Service).

== Books published ==
- URDU SAHAFAT KA ISTEGHASA (Research Book)
- JONK (Collection of Short Stories)
- NIJAT KA RASTA (Moral Values)
- HOO-BA-HOO (Sketches of contemporary writers, poets and journalists)
- AAZMAISH (Novel)
- VEERANI NAHIN JAATI (Novel)
- KARBALA SE KOOFEY TAK (History)
- SHAH NAMA E KARBALA (Long Poem)
- KARBALA KI BAHADUR KHAWATEEN (History)
- QATILANE HUSAIN KA IBRATNAK ANJAM (History)
- SPAIN SE BOSNIA TAK (History)
- NOSTRADAMUS KI SACHCHI AUR HAIRAT ANGEZ PESHANGOIYAN(Mysticism)
- JALIANWALA BAGH KA HERO (Urdu Translation, National Book Trust (NBT))
- TODA & TORA (Urdu Translation, National Book Trust (NBT))
- INDIA 2001 (Urdu Translation, National Council for Promotion of Urdu Language (NCPUL))

== Awards ==
- Film Avlokan Award (Twice)
- Matra Shree Award (Twice)
- Alami Urdu Award for Lifetime Achievements in Journalism
- Delhi Urdu Academy Award for Excellence in Journalism
- U. P. Urdu Academy Award for Short Stories
- Mir -E- Qalam Award (All India Mir Academy, Lucknow)
- Baba – E - Urdu Dr. Abdul Haq Award
- Ramkishan Jaidayal Dalmia Award for National Harmony.http://www.dalmiabrothers.com/oufawards.htm
