= Amaniganj, Lucknow =

Coordinates: 27.145°N 80.913°E

Amaniganj is a neighbourhood in Lucknow's Ganesh Ganj ward. There is an Indian post office Bakshi Ka Talab of Lucknow district Amaniganj, Uttar Pradesh 226203.
