= Baragaon, Kotla =

Village in Uttar Pradesh, India

Baragaon
- Village
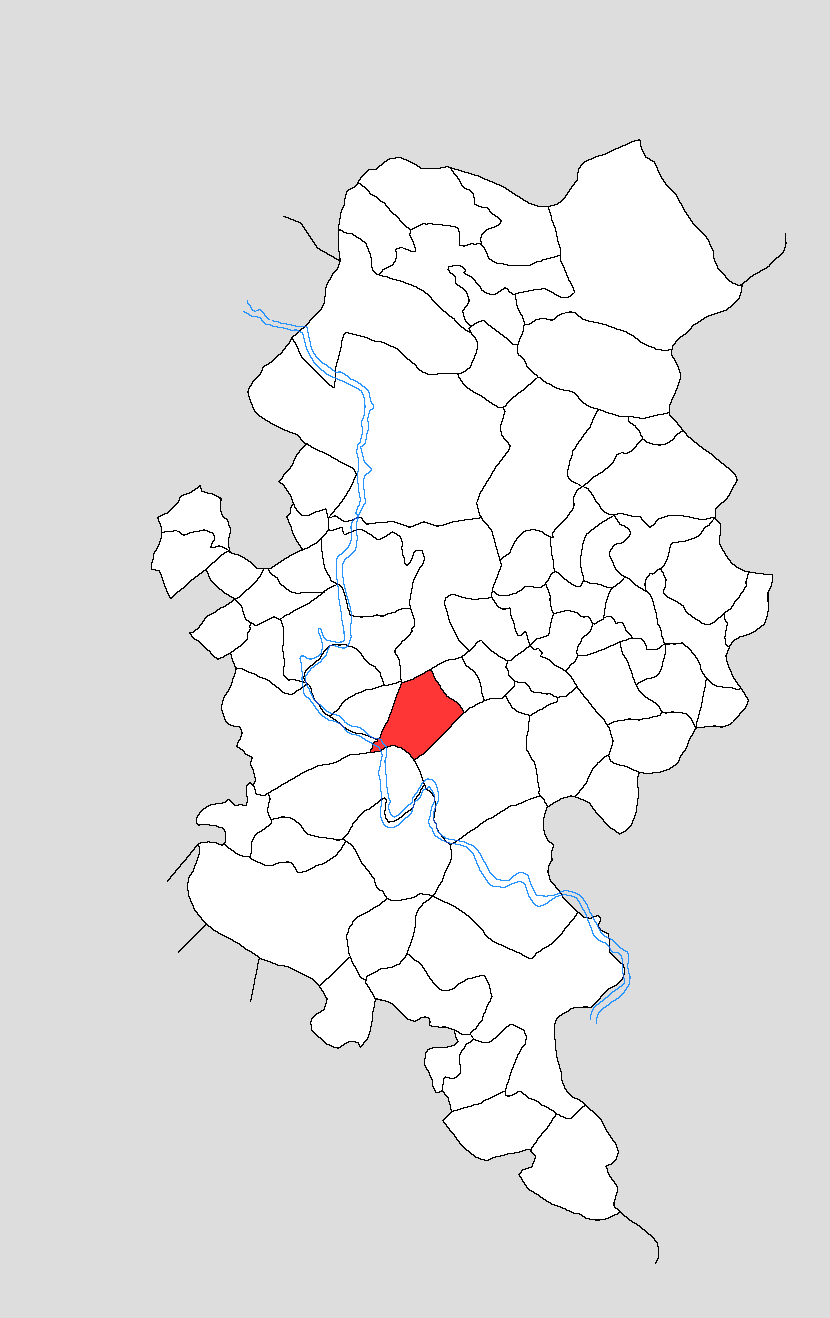
- Map showing Baragaon in Kotla block

- Location in Uttar Pradesh, India
- Coordinates: 27.2541°N 78.40573°E
- Country: India
- State: Uttar Pradesh
- District: Firozabad
- Tehsil: Firozabad

Area
  - Total: 2.025 km^{2} (0.782 sq mi)

Population (2011)
  - Total: 1,181
  - Density: 583.2/km^{2} (1,511/sq mi)
- Time zone: UTC+5:30 (IST)

Baragaon (Baṛāgā̃v) is a village in Kotla block of Firozabad district, Uttar Pradesh. As of 2011, it has a population of 1,181, in 192 households.

== Demographics ==
As of 2011, Baragaon had a population of 1,181, in 192 households. This population was 52.2% male (616) and 47.8% female (565). The 0-6 age group numbered 219 (108 male and 111 female), making up 18.5% of the total population. 287 residents were members of Scheduled Castes, or 24.3% of the total.

The 1981 census recorded Baragaon as having a population of 662 people (363 male and 299 female), in 116 households and 112 physical houses.

The 1961 census recorded Baragaon as comprising 1 hamlet, with a total population of 490 people (277 male and 213 female), in 98 households and 72 physical houses. The area of the village was given as 509 acres.

== Infrastructure ==
As of 2011, Baragaon had 2 primary schools; it did not have any healthcare facilities. Drinking water was provided by hand pump and tube well/borehole; there were no public toilets. The village did not have a post office or public library; there was at least some access to electricity for all purposes. Streets were made of both kachcha and pakka materials.
