= Baragaon, Karnataka =

Baragaon
- Village
- Interactive map of Baragaon
- Coordinates: 15°40′04″N 74°31′58″E
- Country: India
- State: Karnataka
- District: Belagavi
- Talukas: Khanapur

Government
  - Type: Panchayat raj
  - Body: Gram panchayat

Languages
  - Official: Kannada
- Time zone: UTC+5:30 (IST)
- ISO 3166 code: IN-KA
- Vehicle registration: KA
- Website: karnataka.gov.in

Baragaon is a village in Belagavi district in the southern state of Karnataka, India.
