= Baragaon, Shahganj =

Baragaon
- village
- Location in Uttar Pradesh, India Baragaon (India)
- Coordinates: 26.079°N 82.626°E
- Country: India
- State: Uttar Pradesh
- District: Jaunpur
- Elevation: 303 m (994 ft)

Population (2001)
  - Total: 6,595

Languages
  - Official: Hindi
- Time zone: UTC+5:30 (IST)
- PIN: 223103
- Telephone code: 05453

Baragaon is a village in Jaunpur district, Uttar Pradesh state, India. It is 6 kilometres (3.7 mi) from Shahganj Railway station toward east–west direction on Lucknow road.
