= Tarun, Ayodhya =

Tarun
- Town
- Country: India
- State: Uttar Pradesh
- District: Ayodhya
- Tehsil: Bikapur
- Block: Tarun

Government
  - Type: Town
- Elevation: 1,346 m (4,416 ft)

Population (2011)
  - Total: 15,985
  - Rank: 32

Language
  - Official: Hindi
  - Additional official: Urdu
  - Regional: Awadhi
- Time zone: UTC+5:30 (IST)
- PIN: 224203
- Vehicle registration: UP 42
- Sex ratio: 1000/1020 ♂/♀

Tarun is a town in Bikapur tehsil, Ayodhya district in the Indian state of Uttar Pradesh, India. Tarun is 30 km south of district headquarters Ayodhya city.

Tarun is also a block in Ayodhya district. There is a police station in Tarun. Tarun is a part of Goshainganj Vidhan Sabha constituency and Ambedkar Nagar Lok Sabha constituency.

== Transport ==
=== Road ===
Tarun is well connected with nearby cities Ayodhya, Sultanpur and Akbarpur. And also Goshainganj, Bikapur, Bhadarsa, Haiderganj, Masodha and Chaure Bazar towns are the nearby towns from Tarun

=== Railway ===
Goshainganj, Ayodhya Junction, Faizabad Junction, and Chaure Bazar are the nearby railway stations from Tarun.

=== Air ===
Ayodhya Airport in Ayodhya is the nearest airport from Tarun.

== Demographics ==
As of 2011 India census, Tarun Bazaar had a population of 15,990. Males constitute 51% of the population and females 49%. Tarun Bazaar has an average literacy rate of 62%, higher than the national average of 59.5%: male literacy is 71%, and female literacy is 52%. In Tarun Bazaar, 17% of the population is under 6 years of age.

Religions in Tarun Bazaar
Religion	Percent
Hindus	85%
Muslims	15%
Jains	0%
Others†	0%
Distribution of religions †Includes Sikhs (0%), Buddhists (<0%).
