= Boragaon =

Town in Karnataka, India

- Town
- Location in Karnataka, India Boragaon (India)
- Coordinates: 16°35′54.909″N 74°30′33.424″E
- Country: India
- State: Karnataka
- District: Belgaum
- Talukas: Nippani

Government
  - Type: Panchayat raj

Population (2001)
  - Total: 13,519

Languages
  - Official: Kannada
- Time zone: UTC+5:30 (IST)
- Postal code: 591216

Boragaon is a Town located in the Nippani Taluka of the Belagavi district in the state of Karnataka, India.

== Demographics ==
At the 2001 India census, Boragaon had a population of 13519 with 7012 males and 6507 females.

== See also ==
- Belgaum
- Districts of Karnataka
