= Sohawal =

- Town
- Location in Uttar Pradesh, India
- Coordinates: 26°45′00″N 81°59′10″E
- Country: India
- State: Uttar Pradesh
- District: Ayodhya
- Elevation: 1,346 m (4,416 ft)

Population (2011)
  - Total: 25,123
  - Rank: 9

Language
  - Official: Hindi
  - Additional official: Urdu
- Time zone: UTC+5:30 (IST)
- PIN: 224188
- Vehicle registration: UP-42
- Sex ratio: 1000/1000 ♂/♀
- Website: up.gov.in

Sohawal is a town and tehsil in Ayodhya district in the Indian state of Uttar Pradesh and is sub post office of Ayodhya. Sohawal is 18 km west of district headquarters Ayodhya.

== Demographics ==
Religions in Sohawal
Religion	Percent
Hindus	75%
Muslims	15%
Jains	10%
Others†	0%
Distribution of religions †Includes Sikhs (0%), Buddhists (<0%).

As of 2011 India census, Sohawal had a population of 25,123. Males constitute 51% of the population and females 49%. Sohawal has an average literacy rate of 62%, higher than the national average of 59.5%: male literacy is 71%, and female literacy is 52%. In Sohawal, 17% of the population is under 6 years of age.

== Government and politics ==
Sohawal is a block in the Ayodhya district in Uttar Pradesh.

The town is a part of Ayodhya Lok Sabha constituency in Uttar Pradesh, India. Lallu Singh from Bharatiya Janata Party is the MP of Ayodhya Lok Sabha constituency in Uttar Pradesh.

== Transport ==
=== Road ===
Sohawal is well connected with nearby cities Ayodhya and also with Rudauli, Goshainganj and Bikapur towns of Ayodhya district.

=== Railway ===
Sohawal railway station serves the town of Sohawal.

=== Air ===
Ayodhya International Airport is the nearest airport.
