= Baragaon, Ayodhya =

Village in India

Baragaon
- Village
- Interactive map of Baragaon
- Country: India
- State: Uttar Pradesh
- District: Ayodhya

Population
  - Total: 2,087

Baragaon is a village in Ayodhya district in India, 30 km from Ayodhya district headquarters.

== Population ==
In the 1951 census, Baragon had a total population of 2,080, of which 575 belonged to Scheduled Castes and 1,505 were from the 'Others' category.
