= Baragaon, Barabanki =

Baragaon
- village
- Location in Uttar Pradesh, India Baragaon (India)
- Coordinates: 26.976°N 81.309°E
- Country: India
- State: Uttar Pradesh
- District: Barabnki

Government
  - Body: Gram panchayat

Languages
  - Official: Hindi
- Time zone: UTC+5:30 (IST)
- PIN: 225204
- Vehicle registration: UP-41
- Website: up.gov.in

Baragaon or Badagaon is a census village and panchayat of Masauli Block in Barabanki district in the state of Uttar Pradesh, India.

== Geography ==
Baragaon is located at 26°58′32″N 81°18′32″E.

== See also ==
- Qidwai
