= Bikapur =

- Town
- Interactive map of Bikapur
- Country: India
- State: Uttar Pradesh
- Division: Ayodhya
- District: Ayodhya
- Tehsil: Bikapur

Population (2011)
  - Total: 14,453

Language
  - Official: Hindi
  - Additional official: Urdu
  - Regional: Awadhi
- Vehicle registration: UP-42

Bikapur is a town, tehsil and nagar panchayat of Ayodhya district of Uttar Pradesh state in India. Bikapur is 20 km south of the district headquarters Ayodhya city.

== Demographics ==
In 2011 total population of Bikapur 14,453.

== Governance and politics ==
=== Civic administration ===
Bikapur is also a block in Ayodhya district in Uttar Pradesh. There is a police station in Bikapur.

=== Villages ===
Villages in Bikapur tehsil include Dhamhar.

== Places of interest ==
There are many nearest tourist attraction places like as Sitakund (2 km) which is 84 kosi parikarma site, Bharatkund (6 km) Bharat Hanuman Milaap sthal and Ayodhya (25 km) Birthplace of Lord Rama.

== Transport ==
=== By air ===
Ayodhya Airport (20 km) is the nearest airport to reach Bikapur.

=== By rail ===
The Indian railway network connects Ayodhya, Sultanpur, Pratapgarh and Prayagraj with Bikapur. Ayodhya Cantt, Ayodhya Junction, and Sultanpur Junction are the nearby railway stations from Bikapur.

=== By road ===
Bikapur is on the NH 330 and therefore has good road connectivity with Ayodhya, Sultanpur, Pratapgarh and Prayagraj using the NH 330. Bikapur is also well connected by road with nearby towns Bhadarsa, Masodha, Tarun, Haiderganj, and Milkipur.
