= Haiderganj =

Town in Uttar Pradesh, India

- Town
- Location in Uttar Pradesh, India
- Country: India
- State: Uttar Pradesh
- Division: Ayodhya
- District: Ayodhya
- Tehsil: Bikapur
- Block: Tarun

Language
  - Official: Hindi
  - Additional official: Urdu
  - Regional language: Awadhi
- Time zone: UTC+5:30 (IST)
- PIN: 224205
- Vehicle registration: UP-42
- Website: ayodhya.nic.in

Haiderganj is a town in the Bikapur tehsil of Ayodhya district of the Indian state of Uttar Pradesh. Haiderganj is 40 km south of district headquarters Ayodhya.

== Civic administration ==
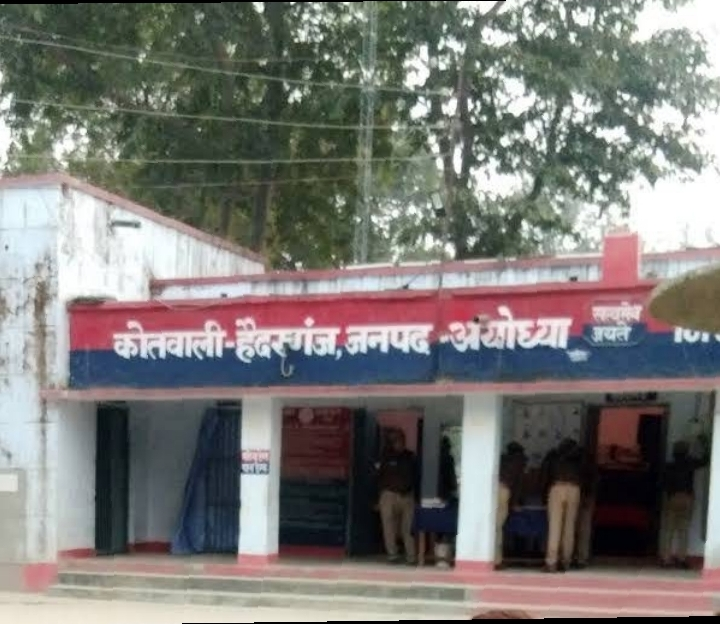
Police station Haiderganj, Ayodhya

There is a police station (Thana) in Haiderganj. Haiderganj is a part of Tarun block in Ayodhya district.

== Politics ==
Haiderganj is a part of Goshainganj Vidhan Sabha constituency and Ambedkar Nagar Lok Sabha constituency. Abhay Singh from Samajwadi Party is an MLA of Goshainganj Vidhan Sabha constituency in Uttar Pradesh, India. And Ritesh Pandey from BSP is an MP of Ambedkar Nagar Lok Sabha constituency in Uttar Pradesh state, India.

== Transport ==
=== By Road ===
Haiderganj is well connected with nearby cities and towns due to good road connectivity. Ayodhya (40 km), Sultanpur (32 km), Akbarpur (35 km) and Pratapgarh (73 km)are the nearby cities connected well with Haiderganj.

Bhiti (7 km), Tarun (10 km), Fulauna (11 km), Chaure Bazar (12 km), Kurebhar (13 km), Semari (15 km), Goshainganj (20 km), Bikapur (21 km) and Maharua (21 km) are the nearby towns and markets connected very well with Haiderganj.

=== By Train ===
Goshainganj, Ayodhya Junction, Faizabad Junction, Akbarpur Junction, and Sultanpur Junction are the nearby railway stations.

=== By Air ===
Ayodhya Airport is the nearest airport from Haiderganj.

== Education ==
- Kalpana Shikshan Prashikshan P.G. College, Sarai Manodhar, Haiderganj
- Shri Baijnath Shivkala Mahavidyalaya, Haiderganj

== See also ==
- Nandigram, Ayodhya
