= Bhadarsa =

- Town
- Location in Uttar Pradesh, India Bhadarsa (India)
- Coordinates: 26°39′37″N 82°07′27″E
- Country: India
- State: Uttar Pradesh
- District: Ayodhya

Population (2011)
  - Total: 13,154

Languages
  - Official: Hindi, Urdu
- Time zone: UTC+5:30 (IST)
- Postal code: 224202
- Website: up.gov.in

Bhadarsa is a town and nagar panchayat in Ayodhya district in state of Uttar Pradesh, India. Bhadarsa is 22 km south of district headquarters Ayodhya city.

== Transport ==
=== Road ===
Due to very close to Ayodhya- Sultanpur NH 330, Bhadarsa is very well connectivity with nearby cities and towns in Uttar Pradesh. Ayodhya, Sultanpur, Pratapgarh are the nearby cities. And Bikapur, Masodha, Tarun, Haiderganj, Chaure Bazar, Sohawal are the nearby towns well connected with Bhadarsa.

=== Railway ===
Bharatkund Railway Station is the nearest local railway station. Ayodhya Cantt and Ayodhya Dham Junction are the nearby main railway stations from Bhadarsa.

=== Air ===
Ayodhya Airport is nearest airport from Bhadarsa.

== Demographics ==
As of the 2011 Census of India, Bhadarsa had a population of 13154. Males constitute 51% of the population and females 49%. Bhadarsa has an average literacy rate of 55%, lower than the national average of 59.5%; with 58% of the males and 42% of females literate. 12% of the population is under 6 years of age.

Religions in Bhadarsa
Religion	Percent
Hindus	41.6%
Muslims	57.4%
Jains†	0.3%
Others†	0.7%
Distribution of religions
