= Ayodhya Airport =

Airport serving Ayodhya, Uttar Pradesh, India

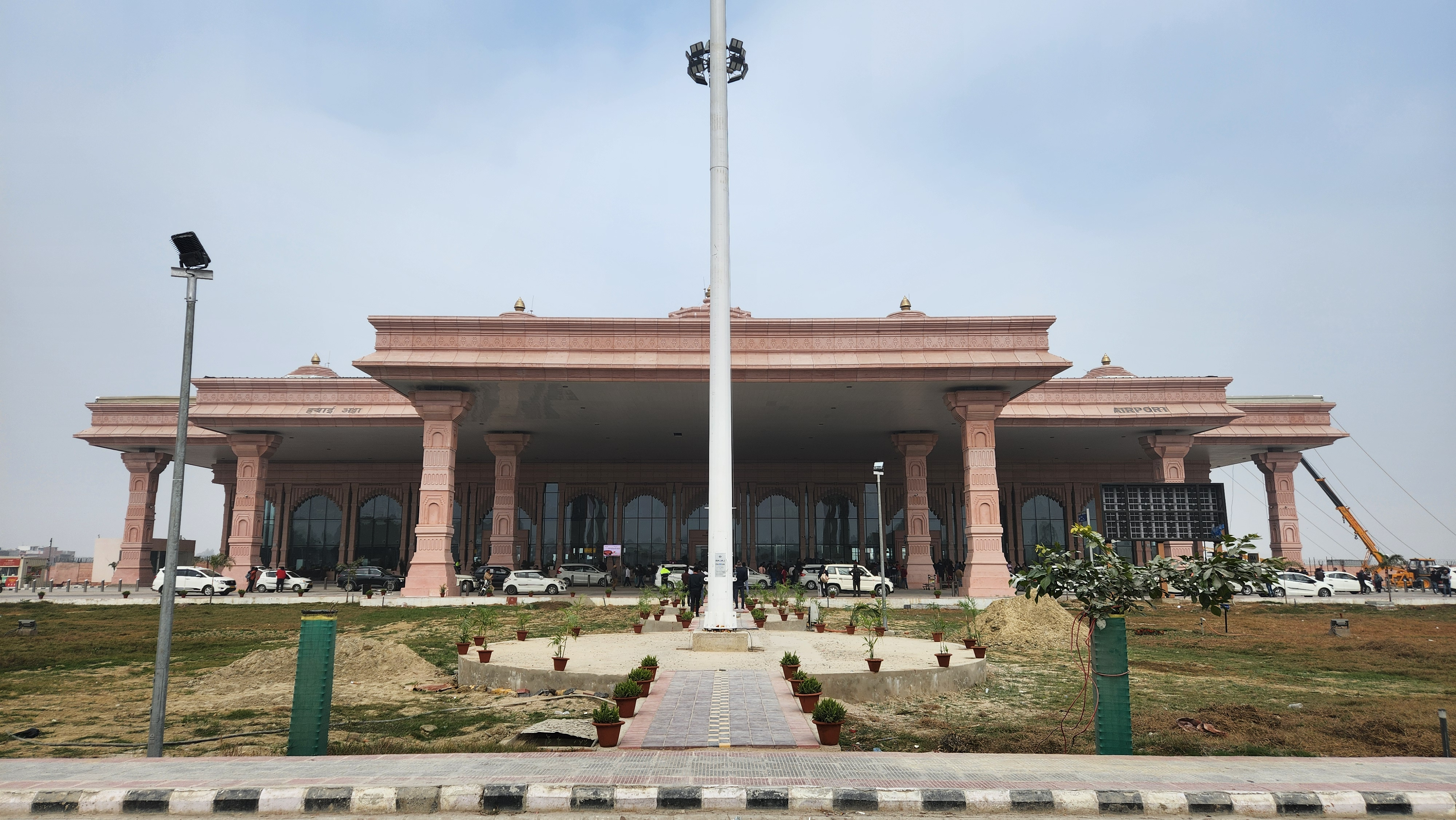
- IATA: AYJ; ICAO: VEAY

Summary
- Airport type: Public
- Owner: Government of India
- Operator: Airports Authority of India
- Serves: Ayodhya–Faizabad
- Location: Ayodhya, Uttar Pradesh, India
- Opened: 30 December 2023; 2 years ago
- Elevation AMSL: 102 m (335 ft)
- Coordinates: 26.7480337°N 82.1507812°E

Map
- Location of airport in Uttar Pradesh AYJ (India)

Runways
Direction	Length		Surface
Direction	m	ft	Surface
11/29	2,250	7,381	Concrete

Statistics (April 2025 – March 2026)
- Passengers: 19,23,651 (▼ -17.2%)
- Aircraft movements: 5,736 (▼ -24.1%)
- Cargo tonnage: —
- Source: Airports Authority of India

Ayodhya Airport (IATA: AYJ, ICAO: VEAY), officially named Maharshi Valmiki International Airport, Ayodhyadham, is an international airport in Ayodhya in the Indian state of Uttar Pradesh.

An airstrip existed at the current location of the airport, which was earlier used by the Indian Air Force. Since 2008, the airstrip was rented for use by private aircraft by the Government of Uttar Pradesh. In 2013, it was transferred to the Airports Authority of India to develop an airport under the UDAN scheme of the Government of India. In 2018, the state government announced an expansion plan for the airport. The construction began in February 2022, and was completed by late 2023. It was inaugurated on 30 December 2023, and commercial flight operations began on 10 January 2024.

== History ==
=== Background and planning ===
The Faizabad airstrip, which existed at the location of the airport, was earlier used by the Indian Air Force. In 2008, the Government of Uttar Pradesh allowed the unused airstrip for usage by private aircraft for a fee. In 2012, the Minister of Civil Aviation announced plans to develop the existing airstrip at Faizabad to improve regional connectivity and tourism. In 2013, the state government approved the transfer of the airstrip to the Airports Authority of India (AAI) to develop the airport as a part of the UDAN scheme of the Government of India.

=== Expansion ===
In 2018, the state government announced plans for the expansion of the airport and allocated ₹2 billion for acquiring land acquisition for the same. On 12 August 2020, the state government said that ₹5.25 billion (US$55 million) has been approved and ₹3 (3.1¢ US) has been spent for land acquisition for the airport. On 16 September 2020, the AAI projected that 478.1 acres (193.5 ha) of land would be required for the first phase of the airport. On 10 March 2021, the central government allocated ₹2.42 billion (US$25 million) for the development of the airport, and the state government had completed 270 acres (110 ha) of land acquisition for the same. On 8 April 2022, the state government signed a lease agreement with the AAI for the transfer of 317.85 acres (128.63 ha).

=== Construction and opening ===
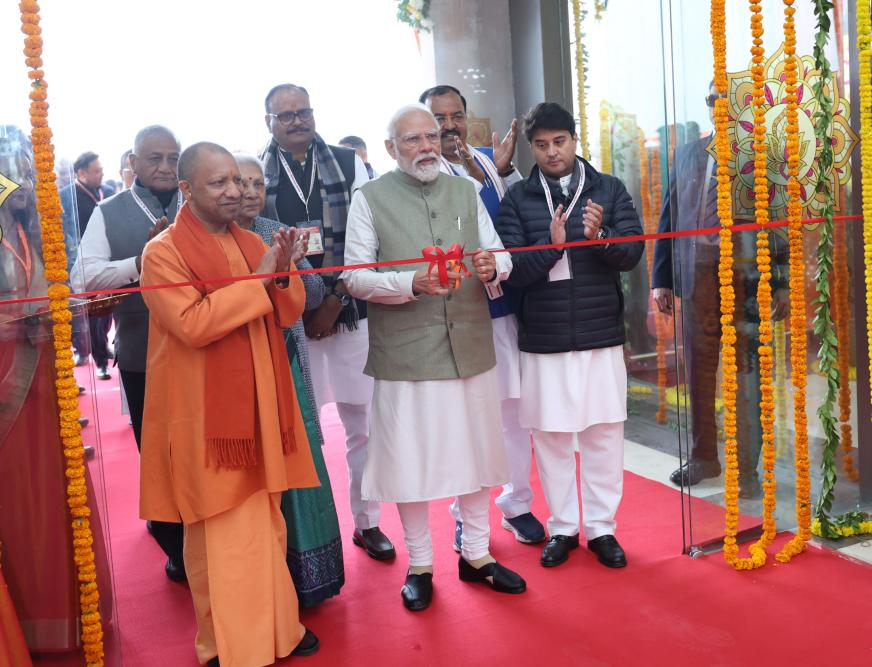
Prime Minister Narendra Modi inaugurating the airport on 30 December 2023

The construction began in February 2022. In April 2022, the state government announced that the airport would become operational before the completion of the Ram Mandir in Ayodhya. In 2021, the state government had proposed to name the airport after Hindu deity Rama, the protagonist of the epic Ramayana, who was born in Ayodhya. However, in December 2023, the airport was named after Maharishi Valmiki, the author of Ramayana. By December 2022, about 45% of the works had been completed, and the airport was planned to be completed by December 2023. The construction of the airport was completed by late 2023 and the airport as inaugurated by Prime Minister Narendra Modi on 30 December 2023. Commercial flight operations began from 10 January 2024, with IndiGo flying the inaugural flight out of the airport.

== Infrastructure ==
=== Runway ===
The existing airstrip was 1,500 m (4,900 ft) long and 30 m (98 ft) wide, and was capable of handling only smaller aircraft. In 2018, the AAI had announced plans for the expansion of the runway to make it capable of handling larger narrow body aircraft. The runway was planned to be extended to 2,500 m (8,200 ft) in length and 45 m (148 ft) in width, with a 100–150 m (330–490 ft)-wide set-off area on each side of the runway. The runway extension was planned to be completed in two phases, with the runway extended to 2,250 m (7,380 ft) in the first phase, and further to 3,125 m (10,253 ft) in the second phase. The runway was proposed to be extended by another 625 m (2,051 ft) to 3,750 m (12,300 ft) in the third phase if required, which will make it capable of handling wide body aircraft. The runway was equipped with Instrument Landing System (ILS), Doppler Very-high frequency Omnidirectional Range (DVOR) and Distance Measuring Equipment (DME) during the first phase of development.

=== Passenger terminal ===
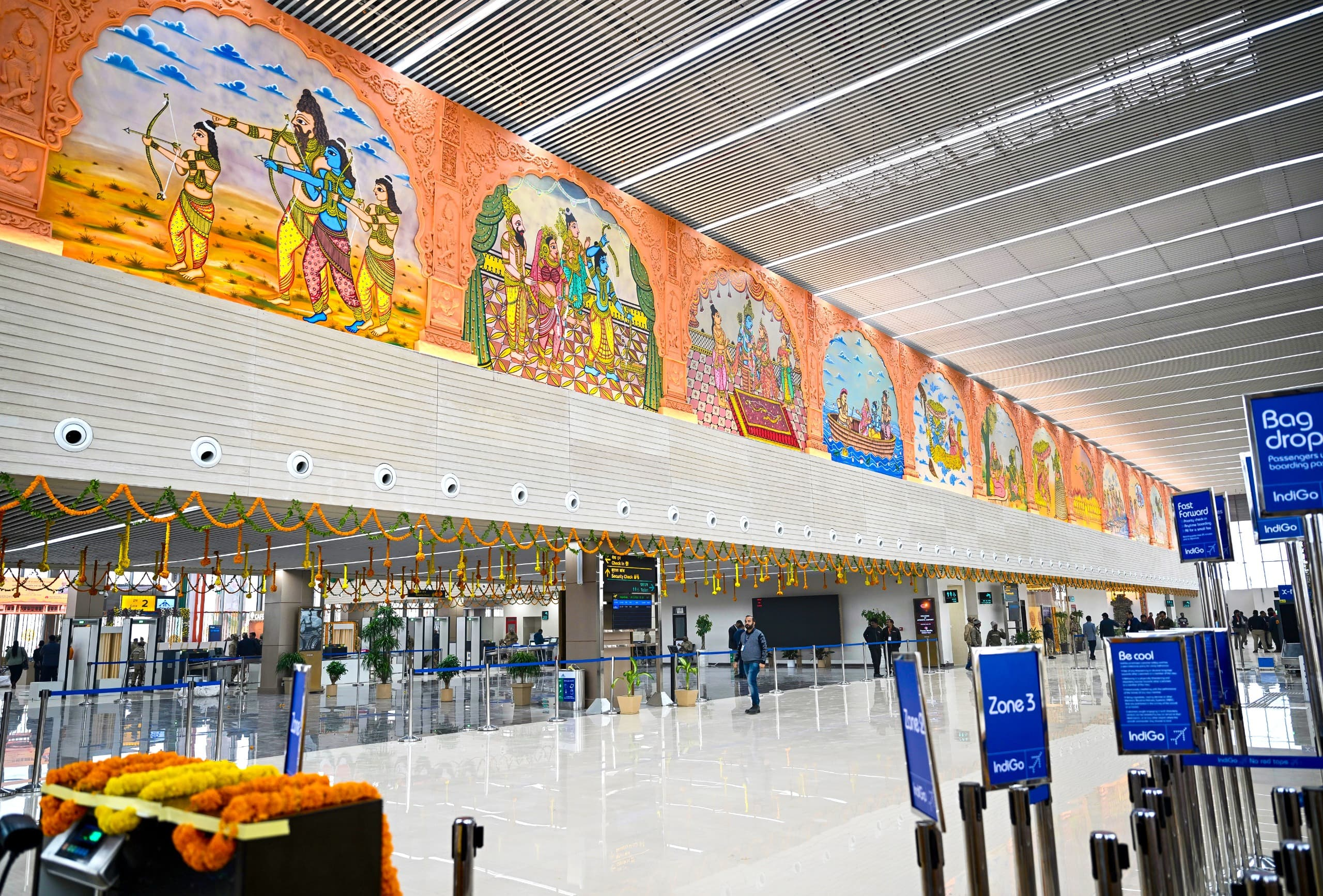
Interior of the airport with art depicting scenes from the Ramayana

Terminal 1 covers an area of 6,500 m^{2} (70,000 sq ft) and was completed as part of the first phase of the airport's development. It is capable of handling 300 passengers during peak hours and around 1 million passengers annually. The terminal is equipped with nine check-in counters, three conveyor belts, and two lounges.

The airport has been designed to portray the local culture and heritage. The terminals contain several murals and wall art in Madhubani art and Pattachitra art forms, and sculptures from the Nagara style of temple architecture. The art depicts the symbolism and scenes from the Ramayana and the Mahabharata. The architectural style also uses symbols such as "bow and arrow" that symbolises its association with Rama. The terminal is built with red stone with carved pillars at the entrance, and mixes Indian temple architecture with modern architecture. The roof of the terminal, measuring 65,000 ft^{2} (6,000 m^{2}), is supported by seven big columns, symbolising the seven kandas (books) of Ramayana. The terminal has a rectangular base with carved pillars and adorned with a shikara on its top. The terminal uses clean energy to generate electricity and follows sustainable measures to dispose waste, and conserve water.

=== Other facilities ===
The airport has an apron suitable for parking of four narrow-body aircraft. Within its premises, the airport has parking spaces for vehicles, a fuel farm, a fuel station, a fire station, an Air Traffic Control tower and other ancillary facilities. There are several hotels attached to the airport.

== Future expansion ==
Terminal 2 will cover an area of 50,000 m^{2} (540,000 sq ft) and will be the second terminal of the airport planned as part of the second phase of the airport's development. It will be able to accommodate 3,200 passengers during peak hours and over 5-7 million passengers annually. It will have eight aerobridges and additional apron for parking of eight narrow-body aircraft. A garden and a parking space has also been planned as a part of the second phase. As of November 2023, the second phase of the airport's development, is under bidding process.

Terminal 3 will cover an area of 50,000 m^{2} (540,000 sq ft) and will be the third terminal of the airport planned as part of the final phase of the airport's development. An additional apron suitable for parking of eight wide-body aircraft is planned as a part of the final phase. A new Air Traffic Control tower, and fire station is also planned as part of the expansion. A medical college will also be established between terminals 2 and 3.

== Airlines and destinations ==
Airlines	Destinations
Air India Express	Bengaluru, Delhi
Akasa Air	Delhi
Alliance Air	Dehradun, Delhi, Hisar
IndiGo	Ahmedabad, Bengaluru, Delhi, Hyderabad, Navi Mumbai,

== Statistics ==
Operations and statistics
Year	Passengers	Aircraft
2023-24	2,13,015	1,694
2024-25	11,15,016	7,557
2025-26	9,23,651	5,736

Ayodhya Airport passenger traffic (2025–2026)
Month	2025	2026	Change (%)
January	106,744	68,884	−35.5%
February	102,108	57,442	−43.7%
March	122,918	61,691	−49.8%
April	110,162	67,332	−38.9%
May	98,924	69,751	−29.5%
June	82,602	45,185	−45.3%
July	56,557	30,668	−45.8%
August	54,373	36,338	−33.2%
Total	734,388	437,291	−40.5%

== Connectivity ==
A 3.2 km (2.0 mi)-long four-lane approach road connects the airport with NH-27, running along the western side of the airport. The nearest bus station from the airport is Faizabad Bus Depot, located 5 km (3.1 mi) away to the north-west, while Ayodhya Dham Central Bus Station is located 16 km (9.9 mi) away to the north-east.

The nearest railway station from the airport is Faizabad, located 6.8 km (4.2 mi) away to the north-west, while the Ayodhya is located 14.8 km (9.2 mi) away to the north-east.

== See also ==
- List of airports in Uttar Pradesh
