= Ayodhya district =

District in Uttar Pradesh, India

Ayodhya district Faizabad district
- District
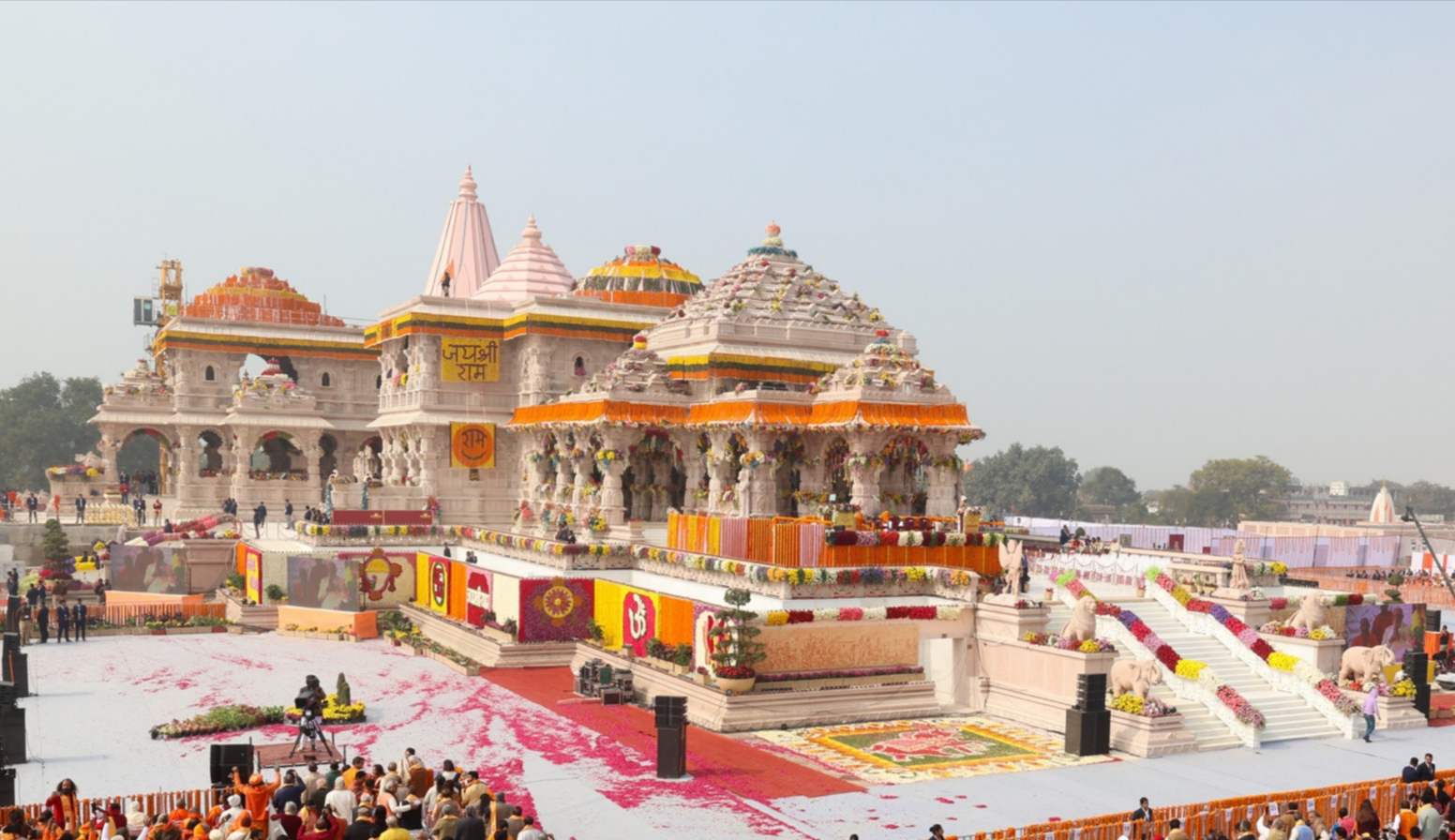
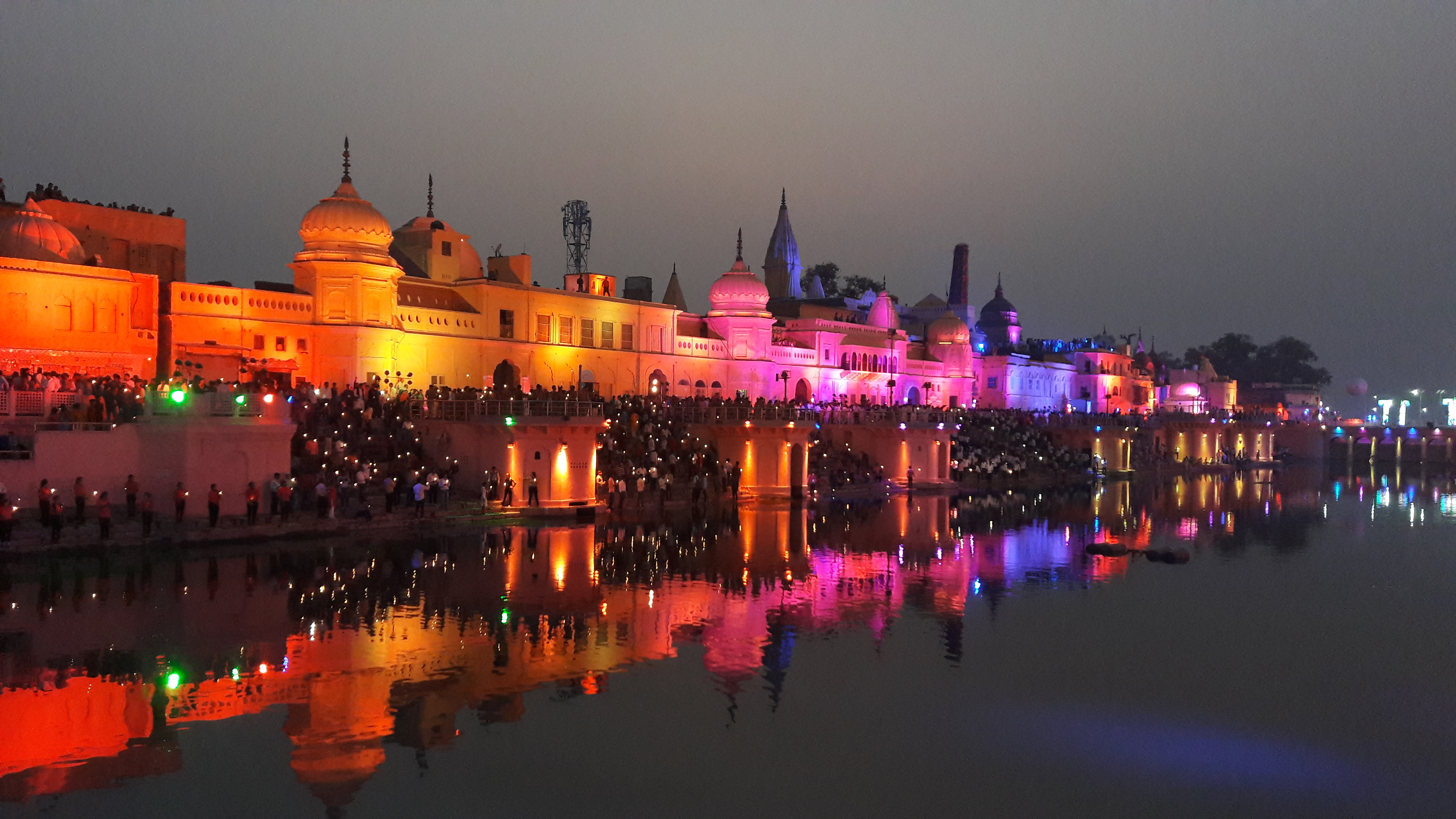
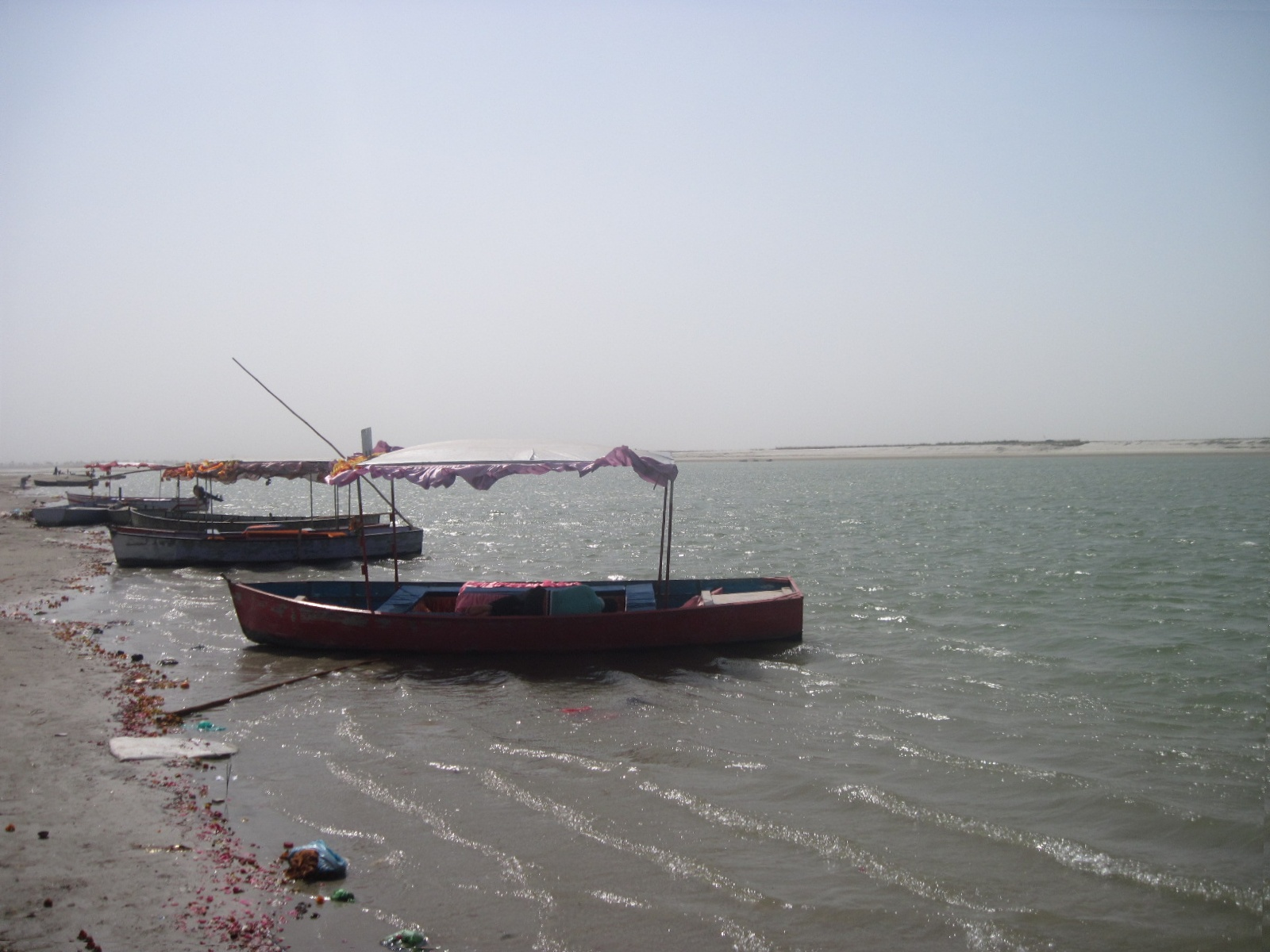
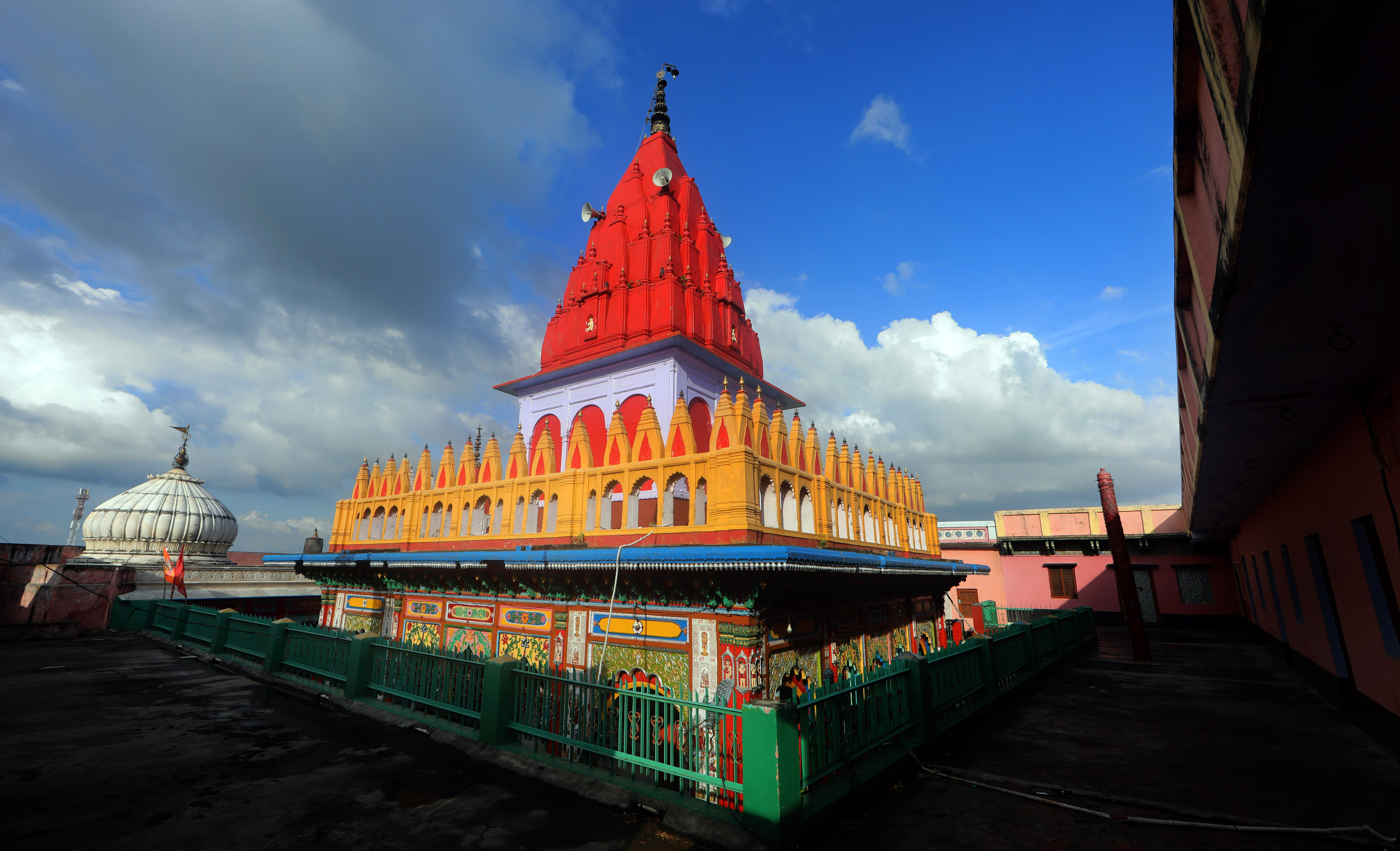
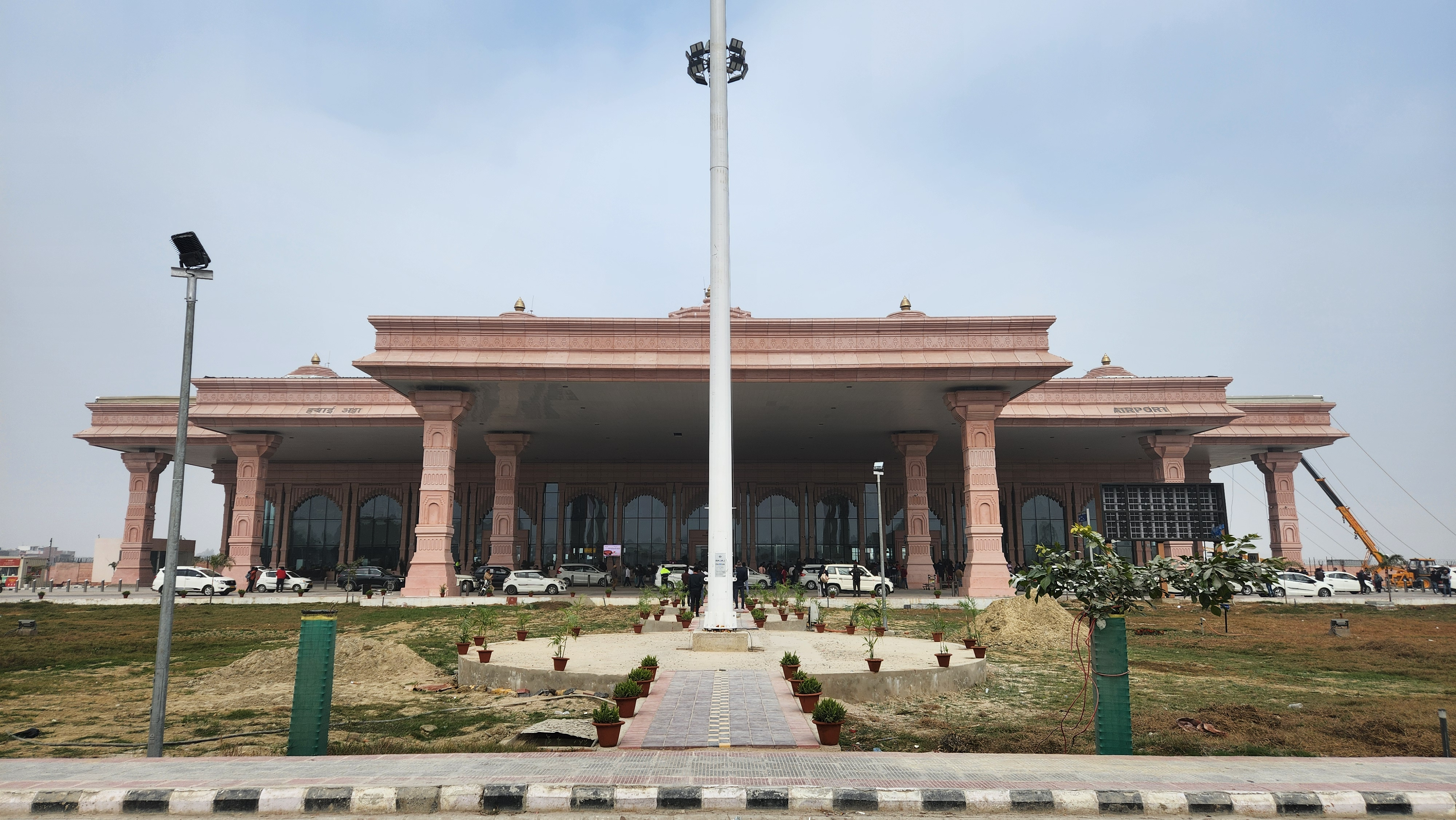
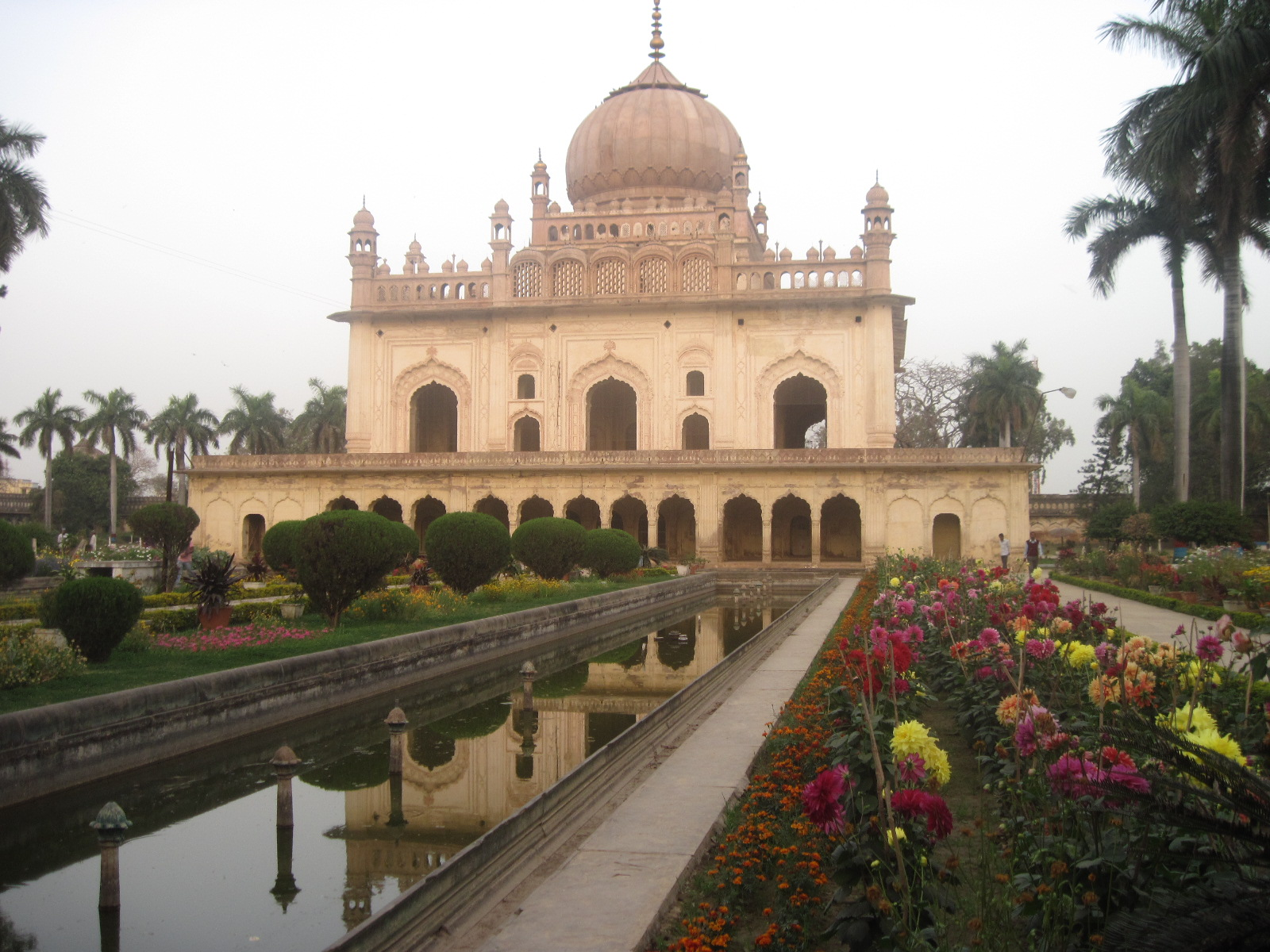
- Clockwise from top-left: Ram Mandir in Ayodhya, Diwali at Ram ki Paidi in Ayodhya, Hanuman Garhi Temple in Ayodhya, Gulab Bari in Faizabad, Ayodhya International Airport in Ayodhya, Saryu River in Ayodhya

- Location of Ayodhya district in Uttar Pradesh
- Country: India
- State: Uttar Pradesh
- Division: Ayodhya
- Headquarters: Ayodhya
- Tehsils: 5

Government
  - District Magistrate: Chandra Vijay Singh (IAS)
  - Lok Sabha constituencies: 1. Faizabad Lok Sabha constituency - Ayodhya, Bikapur, Milkipur, Rudauli; 2. Ambedkar Nagar Lok Sabha constituency - Goshainganj
  - Vidhan Sabha constituencies: 1. Ayodhya; 2. Bikapur; 3. Goshainganj; 4. Milkipur; 5. Rudauli

Area
  - Total: 2,522 km^{2} (974 sq mi)

Population (2011)
  - Total: 2,470,996
  - Density: 979.8/km^{2} (2,538/sq mi)
  - Urban: 689,354

Demographics
  - Literacy: 69.57%
  - Sex ratio: 961
- Time zone: UTC+05:30 (IST)
- Vehicle registration: UP-42
- Major highways: NH 27, NH 330, NH 330A, SH 30
- Website: ayodhya.nic.in

Ayodhya district (formerly Faizabad district) is one of the 75 districts in the northern Indian state of Uttar Pradesh. The city of Ayodhya is its administrative headquarters. The district occupies an area of 2,522 square kilometres (974 sq mi), and had a population of 2,470,996 in the 2011 census. Ayodhya district shares its borders with 6 districts of Uttar Pradesh. It is bordered by Gonda and Basti districts on the northern side, Amethi and Sultanpur districts on the south, and Ambedkar Nagar and Barabanki districts share the border on the east and west.

The official name of the district was changed from Faizabad to Ayodhya in November 2018.

== Demographics ==
Historical population
Year	Pop.	±% p.a.
1901	739,402	—
1911	693,018	−0.65%
1921	694,764	+0.03%
1931	714,938	+0.29%
1941	782,639	+0.91%
1951	873,686	+1.11%
1961	960,818	+0.96%
1971	1,107,515	+1.43%
1981	1,361,862	+2.09%
1991	1,684,747	+2.15%
2001	2,088,928	+2.17%
2011	2,470,996	+1.69%

Religions in Ayodhya district (2011)
Religion	Percent
Hindu	84.75%
Islam	14.80%
Other or not stated	0.45%
Distribution of religions

According to the 2011 Indian census, the district had a population of 2,470,996, of which males were 1,259,628 and females were 1,211,368. The population in the age group of 0–6 years was 360,082. This gave it a ranking of 178th in India (out of a total of 640). The district had a population density of 1,054 inhabitants per square kilometre (2,730/sq mi). Its population growth rate over the decade 2001-2011 was 18.16%. The district had a sex ratio of 961 females for every 1000 males. The total number of literates in the district was 1,450,901, which constitutes 58.7% of the population. The effective literacy rate of those aged 7+ was 70.63%. 13.77% of the population lives in urban areas. Scheduled Castes made up 22.46% of the population.

Languages in Ayodhya district (2011 census)
1. Hindi (83.0%)
2. Awadhi (13.5%)
3. Urdu (3.14%)
4. Others (0.36%)

At the 2011 Census of India, 83.00% of the population in the district identified their first language as Hindi, 13.50% as Awadhi and 3.14% as Urdu.

== Politics ==
Ayodhya district has one Lok Sabha constituency and five Vidhan Sabha constituencies. Awadhesh Prasad of the Samajwadi Party is the sitting MP of Faizabad Lok Sabha constituency. Four of the five legislative assembly seats are held by the BJP and one by the Samajwadi Party. Ved Prakash Gupta (BJP) is the MLA for Ayodhya, Ram Chandra Yadav (BJP) for Rudauli, Chandrabhanu Paswan (BJP) for Milkipur, Amit Singh Chauhan (BJP) for Bikapur and Abhay Singh (Samajwadi Party) for Goshainganj.

== Police stations ==
There are 19 Police stations in Ayodhya district.

- Kotwali, Ayodhya
- Inayat Nagar
- Ayodhya Cantt.
- Kumarganj
- Kotwali Nagar
- Khandasa
- Gosainganj
- Tarun
- Patranga
- Pura Kalandar
- Kotwali, Bikapur
- Mawai
- Maharajganj
- Mahila Thana
- Rudauli
- Ram Janmabhoomi
- Raunahi
- Haiderganj
- Baba Bazaar (newly created 2022).

== Transport ==
=== By Rail ===
The major railway stations in the district are

- Ayodhya Junction
- Ayodhya Cantt
- Rudauli railway station
- Goshainganj railway station

=== By Air ===
Ayodhya International Airport is the international airport in Ayodhya district.

== Education ==
- Avadh University, later renamed the Dr. Ram Manohar Lohia Avadh University, was established in Faizabad, Ayodhya district in 1975.
- Acharya Narendra Deva University of Agriculture and Technology is a university situated in Kumarganj.
- K.S. Saket P.G. College is a degree college situated in Ayodhya city.

== Villages ==
- Baragaon
