= Ambedkar Nagar Lok Sabha constituency =

Lok Sabha Constituency in Uttar Pradesh, India

Coordinates: 25.41°N 81.86°E

Ambedkar Nagar UP-55
- Lok Sabha constituency
- Interactive Map Outlining Ambedkar Nagar Lok Sabha constituency

Constituency details
- Country: India
- Region: North India
- State: Uttar Pradesh
- Assembly constituencies: Goshaiganj; Katehari; Tanda; Jalalpur; Akbarpur
- Established: 2008- Present
- Reservation: None

Member of Parliament
- 18th Lok Sabha
- Incumbent Lalji Verma
- Party: Samajwadi Party
- Elected year: 2024

Ambedkar Nagar Lok Sabha constituency is one of the 80 Lok Sabha (parliamentary) constituencies in the Indian state of Uttar Pradesh. This Lok Sabha Constituency came into existence in 1996 as 11th Lok Sabha was held in April - May 1996. On 29 September 1995 Ambedkar Nagar district was carved out from Faizabad district (now Ayodhya) in the memory of B. R. Ambedkar.

== Assembly segments ==
Presently, Ambedkar Nagar Lok Sabha constituency comprises five Vidhan Sabha (legislative assembly) segments. These are:

No	Name	District	Member	Party	2024 Lead
276	Goshainganj	Ayodhya	Abhay Singh	IND	SP
277	Katehari	Ambedkar Nagar	Dharamraj Nishad	BJP	SP
278	Tanda	Ambedkar Nagar	Ram Murti Verma	SP	SP
280	Jalalpur	Ambedkar Nagar	Rakesh Pandey	SP	SP
281	Akbarpur	Ambedkar Nagar	Ram Achal Rajbhar	SP	SP

Katehari, Tanda, Jalalpur and Akbarpur assembly segments were earlier in erstwhile Akbarpur Lok Sabha constituency.

== Members of Parliament ==
=== As Akbarpur (SC) Lok Sabha constituency ===
Bahujan Samaj Party is the most successful political party in Ambedkar Nagar/Akbarpur Lok Sabha constituency.
1. BSP (7 terms) (38.9%)
2. INC (3 terms) (16.7%)
3. SP (2 terms) (11.1%)
4. JD (2 terms) (11.1%)
5. BJP (1 term) (5.56%)
6. JP (1 term) (5.56%)
7. JP(S) (1 term) (5.56%)
8. RPI (1 term) (5.56%)

Year	Member	Party
1962	Panna Lal	Indian National Congress
1967	Ramji Ram	Republican Party of India
1971	Ramji Ram	Indian National Congress
1977	Mangal Dev Visharad	Janata Party
1980	Ram Avadh	Janata Party (Secular)
1984	Ram Pyare Suman	Indian National Congress
1989	Ram Avadh	Janata Dal
1991	Ram Avadh	Janata Dal
1996	Ghanshyam Kharwar	Bahujan Samaj Party
1998	Mayawati	Bahujan Samaj Party
1999	Mayawati	Bahujan Samaj Party
2002^	Tribhuvan Dutt	Bahujan Samaj Party
2004	Mayawati	Bahujan Samaj Party
2004^	Shankhlal Majhi	Samajwadi Party

=== As Ambedkar Nagar Lok Sabha Constituency ===
Year	Member	Party
2009	Rakesh Pandey	Bahujan Samaj Party
2014	Hari Om Pandey	Bharatiya Janata Party
2019	Ritesh Pandey	Bahujan Samaj Party
2024	Lalji Verma	Samajwadi Party

^By Poll

== Election results ==
=== General Election 2024 ===
2024 Indian general elections: Ambedkar Nagar
Party	Candidate	Votes	%	±%
SP	Lalji Verma	544,959	46.30	▲46.30
BJP	Ritesh Pandey	4,07,712	34.64	▼8.31
BSP	Qamar Hayat	1,99,499	16.95	▼34.80
NOTA	None of the Above	7,448	0.63	▼0.41
Majority		1,37,247	11.64	▲2.84
Turnout		11,77,062	61.58	▲0.50
SP gain from BSP		Swing		

=== General Election 2019 ===
2019 Indian general elections: Ambedkar Nagar
Party	Candidate	Votes	%	±%
BSP	Ritesh Pandey	564,118	51.75	+23.46
BJP	Mukut Bihari	4,68,238	42.95	+1.18
PSP(L)	Premnath Nishad	2,390	0.22	+0.22
NOTA	None of the Above	11,344	1.04	
Majority		95,880	8.80	
Turnout		10,90,615	61.08	
BSP gain from BJP		Swing		

=== General Election 2014 ===
2014 Indian general elections: Ambedkar Nagar
Party	Candidate	Votes	%	±%
BJP	Hari Om Pandey	4,32,104	41.77	
BSP	Rakesh Pandey	2,92,675	28.29	
SP	Ram Murti Verma	2,34,467	22.67	
INC	Ashok Singh	22,775	2.20	
MADP	Suresh Kumar Bauddh	7,694	0.74	
NOTA	None of the Above	7,422	0.72	
Majority		1,39,429	13.48	
Turnout		10,34,435	60.18	
BJP gain from BSP		Swing		

=== General Election 2009 ===
2009 Indian general elections: Ambedkar Nagar
Party	Candidate	Votes	%	±%
BSP	Rakesh Pandey	259,487	32.00%	
SP	Shankhlal Majhi	2,36,751	29.20%	
BJP	Vinay Katiyar	2,26,067	27.88%	
Majority		22,736		
Turnout		8,10,810	54.24%	
BSP win (new seat)				

== See also ==
- Ambedkar Nagar district
- List of constituencies of the Lok Sabha
