= Naipura =

- Village
- Interactive map of Naipura
- Country: India
- State: Uttar Pradesh
- Division: Faizabad
- Tehsil: Tanda

Population (2011)
  - Total: 3,156
  - Density: 2/km^{2} (5.2/sq mi)

Languages
  - Official: Hindi Urdu English
- Time zone: UTC+5:30 (IST)
- Postal code: 224145
- Telephone code: +91-5450
- Vehicle registration: UP, 45

Naipura is a Village of Tanda Ambedkar Nagar, Uttar Pradesh. Naipura is Tehsil of Tanda and It belongs to Faizabad division. Located 26 km toward north from District headquarter Akbarpur, Ambedkar Nagar, 13 km from Tanda, and 200 km from state capital Lucknow. The villagers mostly speak the Hindi local language.

== Notable people ==
- Sanju Devi is a Bharatiya Janata Party politician of Tanda, Uttar Pradesh
- Azimulhaq Pahalwan is a Samajwadi Party politician

== Caste ==
Naipura has a substantial population of Scheduled Caste people. They constitute 25.92% of total population in Naipura village. The village does not have any Scheduled Tribe population.

== Demographic ==
Naipura had a population of 3156, of which 1602 were male and 1554 female at the time of the 2011 Census of India. The children with age 0–6 is 509 which makes up 16.13% of total population of village. The Average Sex Ratio was 970, which is higher than Uttar Pradesh state average of 912. The Child Sex Ratio was 1012, higher than Uttar Pradesh average of 902.

== Transportation ==
The nearest railway station is about 10 kilometres (6.2 mi) distant. Basti is a major railway station, situated 35 kilometres (22 mi) away, and there is also Akbarpur Junction, 20 kilometres (12 mi) away.

== Weather ==
In Naipura, climate of summer (March to July) temperatures can range from 30 to 40 degrees Celsius. Winter climate (November to January) temperatures can range from 10 to 20 degrees Celsius.

== Nearby villages ==
- Aliganj
- Kurram Nagar
- Asopur

== See also ==
- List of villages in India
