= Muhammadullah Khalili Qasmi =

Indian Islamic scholar, mufti and writer (b. 1979)

Maulana, Mufti Muhammadullah Khalili Qasmi
- Born: 14 October 1979 (age 46); Hanswar, Faizabad district (now Ambedkar Nagar district), Uttar Pradesh, India
- Occupations: Islamic scholar, mufti, and writer

Academic background
- Education: Aalimiyyah, Double M.A., PhD
- Alma mater: Darul Uloom Deoband; Markazul Ma'arif Education and Research Centre; Jamia Millia Islamia; Maulana Azad National Urdu University; Jamia Hamdard
- Academic advisors: Naseer Ahmad Khan, Nizamuddin Azami, Noor Alam Khalil Amini, Ishtiyaque Danish

Academic work
- Main interests: Fiqh, Islamic studies, translation
- Notable works: Madrasa Education: Its Strength and Weakness; Ulama, Post-Madrasa Education, Muslim Youth and Contemporary Challenges; Darul Uloom Deoband Ki Jāmi' O Mukhtasar Tareekh (Urdu)

Muhammadullah Khalili Qasmi (born 14 October 1979) is an Indian Islamic scholar, mufti, writer, and trilingual translator of Urdu, Arabic, and English. He is an alumnus of Darul Uloom Deoband, Markazul Ma'arif Education and Research Centre, Jamia Millia Islamia, Maulana Azad National Urdu University, and Jamia Hamdard; and has written several books in English, Urdu, and Arabic.

== Early life and education ==
Muhammadullah Khalili Qasmi was born on 14 October 1979 in Hanswar, Faizabad district (now Ambedkar Nagar district), Uttar Pradesh, India. His father Abdul Salam Muztar Hanswari (1924–2022) was a physician, Quran reciter, poet, and authorized disciple of Abdul Halim Jaunpuri.

Qasmi received his early education from his parents and at Madrasah Ishā'at-ul-Uloom in Hanswar, and he studied Arabic at Madrasa Anwar-ul-Uloom in Bhulepur. In 1995, he enrolled in Darul Uloom Deoband in the sixth grade of Arabic and in 1997, he graduated with distinction. In 1998 and 1999, respectively, he completed courses in Arabic literature and Ifta at Darul Uloom Deoband. He studied Sahih al-Bukhari with Naseer Ahmad Khan, Qawā'id al-Fiqh with Nizamuddin Azami in Ifta, and Arabic literature with Noor Alam Khalil Amini.

After completing his education at Darul Uloom Deoband, Qasmi studied for a diploma in English language and literature at the Markazul Ma'arif Education and Research Centre in New Delhi and Mumbai in 2000 and 2001. In 2006 and 2008, he studied for a Bachelor of Arts in Arabic with English and political science at Jamia Millia Islamia, New Delhi. At the same time, he studied for a diploma in functional Arabic from the National Council for Promotion of Urdu Language in New Delhi, from where he also studied for a diploma in English teaching in 2009.

In 2009 and 2010, Qasmi completed a masters degree in Islamic Studies at Jamia Millia Islamia, Delhi. In 2010, he received his diploma in journalism and mass communication from Maulana Azad National Urdu University, Hyderabad. He also passed the National Eligibility Test (NET) and Research Fellowship (RF) examinations twice in two subjects at the University Grants Commission, New Delhi, in 2009 and 2010. After that, he studied for a Master of Arts (MA) in English at Maulana Azad National Urdu University, Hyderabad, in 2012 and 2013. In 2018, he submitted his thesis on Islamic studies that is entitled "The Contribution of Deoband School to Hanafi Fiqh: A Study of Its Response to Modern Issues and Challenges" to the Department of Islamic Studies at Jamia Hamdard, New Delhi, under the supervision of Ishtiyaque Danish and received his PhD in January 2019.

== Career ==
Qasmi is the editor for the official websites of Darul Uloom Deoband and Darulifta-Deoband.com, and the coordinator of Darul Uloom Deoband's Internet and Online Fatwa sections. He also has a bilingual academic-and-literary website called Deoband Online. Prior to joining Darul Uloom Deoband, Qasmi worked at Markazul Maarif in Mumbai, where he taught English, conducted research, and provided management services for almost three years.

== Literary works ==
Qasmi began writing theses and essays in 1993. Since his student days, his articles have been published in magazines and journals, and he has been associated with the editorial boards of magazines. During his stay at Markazul Maarif in Mumbai, he received training in English essay writing and journalism from the German novelist and journalist Ilija Trojanow.

=== Views ===
According to Qasmi:

As Islam is a comprehensive religion, its education system is also comprehensive. It includes all kinds of sciences and arts that are beneficial for human beings in this world and hereafter. Islam does not encourage such things that seem to be sciences, but they are based on ignorance and useless or even harmful for human beings. Thus, Islam classifies the useful sciences from the useless and harmful ones. Islam gave every science its due position and importance so that people can benefit from them as per their importance and need.

=== Books ===
Qasmi has published works in Urdu and English; he has also translated books to and from Urdu, English, and Arabic. Some of his works include:

- Shama’il an-Nabi (compilation of his father's Poetry collection)
- Madrasa Education: Its Strength and Weakness
- Islamic Speeches (in two volumes)
- Ulama, Post-Madrasa Education, Muslim Youth and Contemporary Challenges
- Silk Latter Movement (English translation of the book "Tehreek-e-Reshmi Roomāl" by Muhammad Miyan Deobandi.)
- Fighi Decisions and Resolutions of Idarat al-Mabahis al-Fiqhiyyah
- Fatwas for America, Part Two
- Thamarat-ul-Aqāid (English and Arabic translation of the book "Samrat al-Aqāid" by Sameeruddin Qasmi)
- Fatāwā Ulama-e-Hind (English translation of Fatawa Ulama-e-Hind compiled by Aneesur Rahman Qasmi)
- Majmoo'a-e-Ash'ār o Ghazaliyyāt (His poetry collection)
- Darul Uloom Deoband Ki Jāmi' O Mukhtasar Tareekh (Urdu; Bengali translation: দারুল উলুম দেওবন্দ : ইতিহাস, ঐতিহ্য, অবদানের গৌরবদীপ্ত দেড় শতাব্দী)
- Darul Uloom Deoband Ka Itihās (Hindi)
