= Pawan Pandey =

Indian politician (born 1968)

Pawan Kumar Pandey
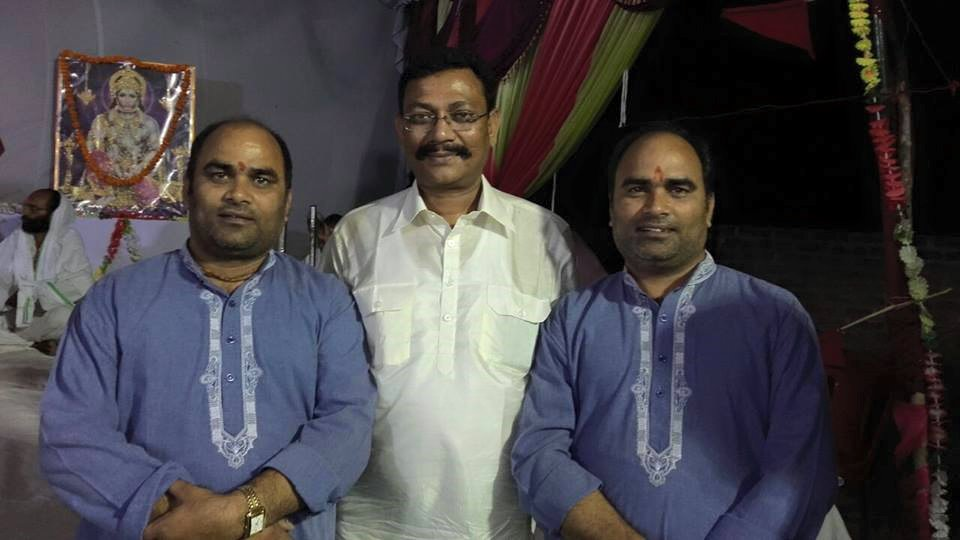

Member of Uttar Pradesh Legislative Assembly
- In office 1991–1993
- Preceded by: Akbar Husain Babar
- Succeeded by: Ram Achal Rajbhar
- Constituency: Akbarpur

Personal details
- Born: January 21, 1968 (age 58) Kotwa Mohamadpur, Uttar Pradesh, India
- Party: Bharatiya Janata Party
- Other political affiliations: Bahujan Samaj Party; Apna Dal; Lok Jan Shakti Party; Shivsena; Independent
- Relations: Rakesh Pandey (elder brother); Ritesh Pandey (nephew)

Pawan Kumar Pandey is an Indian politician from Shiv Sena and a former Member of Uttar Pradesh Legislative Assembly from the Akbarpur constituency in Ambedkar Nagar district.

== Political career ==
He was one among those accused in the Babri Masjid demolition case - arising from the destruction of a mosque in December 1992. He is alleged to have been involved in the planning of the demolition of the Babri Masjid under the leadership of Uma Bharti, Lal Krishna Advani, Ashok Singhal and other members of the Vishva Hindu Parishad. He was elected as an MLA from Akbarpur (Assembly constituency) during the 1991 Uttar Pradesh Legislative Assembly election on a Shiv Sena ticket. He ran for reelection in 1993, but was unseated by the Bahujan Samaj Party's Ram Achal Rajbhar. He also contested Lok Sabha elections from Sultanpur Parliamentary Constituency in 1999 as an independent candidate but lost by a margin of 44,033 votes after gaining 1,29,525 votes. In 2014 he fought on Bahujan Samaj Party ticket but lost by a margin of 1,78,902 after gaining 2,31,446 votes. Since 1991 he fought 4 assembly elections and 2 parliamentary elections but didn't win.

== Personal life ==
His elder brother Rakesh Pandey (politician, born 1952) was a Samajwadi Party MLA from Jalalpur and his younger brother Krishna Kumar Pandey alias Kakku Pandey contested a seat at Isauli in Sultanpur district in 2007 and 2012 legislative assembly elections respectively as a Bahujan Samaj Party candidate. His nephew Ritesh Pandey was MP from Ambedkarnagar district and a member of the Bahujan Samaj Party from 2019-2024. His son Prateek Pandey contested a seat at Katehri in 2022 Vidhan Sabha elections of Uttar Pradesh as a Bahujan Samaj Party candidate.
