= Akbarpur Assembly constituency =

Constituency of the Uttar Pradesh legislative assembly in India

Coordinates: 26.44°N 82.55°E

Akbarpur
- Constituency No. 281 for the Uttar Pradesh Legislative Assembly

Constituency details
- Country: India
- Region: North India
- State: Uttar Pradesh
- District: Ambedkar Nagar
- Established: 1957
- Total electors: 268,672 (2012)
- Reservation: None

Member of Legislative Assembly
- 18th Uttar Pradesh Legislative Assembly
- Incumbent Ram Achal Rajbhar
- Party: Samajwadi Party
- Elected year: 2022

Akbarpur Assembly constituency is one of the 403 constituencies of the Uttar Pradesh Legislative Assembly, India. It is a part of the Ambedkar Nagar district and one of the five assembly constituencies in the Ambedkar Nagar Lok Sabha constituency. Akbarpur Assembly constituency came into existence in 1955 as a result of the "Final Order DC (1953-1955)". The extant and serial number of this constituency was last defined in "Delimitation of Parliamentary and Assembly Constituencies Order, 2008".

== Wards / Areas ==
Akbarpur assembly constituency comprises Akbarpur, Sikandarpur, Rampur Sakarwari & Akbarpur MB of Akbarpur Tehsil.

== Members of the Legislative Assembly ==
Bahujan Samaj Party is the most successful political party in Akbarpur Assembly elections.
1. BSP (5 terms) (29.4%)
2. INC (3 terms) (17.6%)
3. SP (2 terms) (11.8%)
4. CPI(M) (2 terms) (11.8%)
5. INC (I) (1 term) (5.88%)
6. Independent (1 term) (5.88%)
7. PSP (1 term) (5.88%)
8. JP (1 term) (5.88%)
9. Shiv Sena (1 term) (5.88%)

Year	Member	Party
1957	Balwan Singh	Independent
1962	Balwan Singh	Praja Socialist Party
1967	Jai Ram Varma	Indian National Congress
1969	Priyadarshi Jetly	Indian National Congress
1974	Priyadarshi Jetly	Indian National Congress
1977	Hari Ram Verma	Janata Party
1980	Priya Darshi Jetly	Indian National Congress (I)
1985	Akbar Husain Babar	Communist Party of India (Marxist)
1989	Akbar Husain Babar	Communist Party of India (Marxist)
1991	Pawan Pandey	Shiv Sena
1993	Ram Achal Rajbhar	Bahujan Samaj Party
1996	Ram Achal Rajbhar	Bahujan Samaj Party
2002	Ram Achal Rajbhar	Bahujan Samaj Party
2007	Ram Achal Rajbhar	Bahujan Samaj Party
2012	Ram Murti Verma	Samajwadi Party
2017	Ram Achal Rajbhar	Bahujan Samaj Party
2022	Ram Achal Rajbhar	Samajwadi Party

== Election results ==
=== 2027 ===
2027 Uttar Pradesh Legislative Assembly election: Akbarpur
Party	Candidate	Votes	%	±%
INDIA				
NDA				
BSP	Manoj Kumar Verma			
NOTA	None of the above			
Majority				
Turnout				
gain from		Swing		

=== 2022 ===
2022 Uttar Pradesh Legislative Assembly election: Akbarpur
Party	Candidate	Votes	%	±%
SP	Ram Achal Rajbhar	81,931	38.14	▲9.6
BJP	Dharmraj Nishad	69,595	32.39	▲4.09
BSP	Chandra Prakash Verma	53,398	24.85	▼10.55
INC	Priyanka	2,735	1.27	
NOTA	None of the above	1,656	0.77	▼0.08
Majority		12,336	5.75	▼1.11
Turnout		214,843	64.6	▼2.13
SP gain from BSP				

=== 2017 ===
2017 Uttar Pradesh Legislative Assembly election: Akbarpur
Party	Candidate	Votes	%	±%
BSP	Ram Achal Rajbhar	72,325	35.4	
SP	Ram Murti Verma	58,312	28.54	
BJP	Chandra Prakash Verma	57,821	28.3	
NISHAD	Shriram	6,550	3.21	
NOTA	None of the above	1,719	0.85	
Majority		14,013	6.86	
Turnout		204,316	66.73	

=== 2012 ===
2012 Uttar Pradesh Legislative Assembly election: Akbarpur
Party	Candidate	Votes	%	±%
SP	Ram Murti Verma	91,126	51.31	−
BSP	Sanjay Kumar	64,840	36.51	−
INC	Amit Kumar	7,305	4.11	−
NOTA	None of the Above			
Majority		26,286	14.80	−
Turnout		177,613	64.77	−
Registered electors				
SP hold		Swing	-	

== See also ==
- Ambedkar Nagar district
- Ambedkar Nagar Lok Sabha constituency
- Government of Uttar Pradesh
- List of Vidhan Sabha constituencies of Uttar Pradesh
- Uttar Pradesh
- Uttar Pradesh Legislative Assembly
