= Markazul Ma'arif Education and Research Centre =

Islamic educational and research institution located in Jogeshwari, Mumbai

Markazul Ma'arif Education and Research Center
- مرکز المعارف ایجوکیشن اینڈ ریسرچ سنٹر
- Other name: MMERC
- Type: Islamic educational and research institution
- Established: 1994; 32 years ago
- Founder: Badruddin Ajmal
- Affiliations: Markazul Maarif
- Director: Burhanuddin Qasmi
- Location: Oshiwara, Jogeshwari (West), Mumbai, Maharashtra, India
- Website: mmerconline.com

Markazul Ma'arif Education and Research Center (MMERC) is an Islamic educational and research institution located in Jogeshwari, Mumbai, India. Established in 1994 by Badruddin Ajmal, MMERC aims to train madrasa graduates in English language, computer literacy, and modern subjects. The institution seeks to integrate traditional Islamic scholarship with contemporary academic and communication skills, enabling graduates to participate more effectively in modern discourse.

== History ==
MMERC was founded in 1994 as a project of the Assam-based NGO Markazul Maarif. Originally established in Delhi, the centre later shifted its main operations to Mumbai in 2000.

MMERC was set up in response to concerns about the limited engagement of traditional Islamic scholars with modern society, particularly in English-speaking contexts. The founder, Badruddin Ajmal, envisaged the centre as a bridge between classical Islamic education and contemporary professional and social challenges; since its inception MMERC has developed programmes emphasising English proficiency, research methodology, and public engagement for madrasa graduates.

To address the lack of English exposure among madrasa students, MMERC instituted a competitive, structured intake admitting selected candidates through a combined written and oral entrance test and provided intensive training in English and computer skills. The centre has historically offered full residential facilities and scholarships, enabling students from institutions such as Darul Uloom Deoband and Darul Uloom Nadwatul Ulama to participate without financial burden.

== Academic Programs ==
=== DELL (Diploma in English Language and Literature) ===
The center offers a two-year diploma in English language and literature designed specifically for madrasa graduates. The course includes English grammar, literature, public speaking, writing, and exposure to contemporary social and religious issues.

=== Research Programs ===
- One-Year Research Training: Offered to DELL graduates, this program focuses on Islamic and social research projects.
- Two-Year Research Fellowship: Designed to produce original academic contributions and address misconceptions about Islam.

=== Community and Part-Time Courses ===
The center runs several additional programs:

- SELC – Short-term English Language Course for Ulama and Imams
- SALIC – Six-month Islamic awareness course for college students
- VTC – Vocational training and moral education camps for school children
- EC & PD – English communication and personality development for rural graduates
- IQRA – Qur'an recitation and Tajweed for adults
- Maktab – Basic Islamic education for school-going children

=== Markaz Online Madrasa (2023–2024) ===
In July 2023, the MMERC, Mumbai, launched the Markaz Online Madrasa (MOM), an English-medium Islamic learning platform for youth and professionals worldwide. The project was conceived with input from MMERC alumni and approved during a global meeting of the International MMERC Alumni Network (IMAN).

It was officially inaugurated in November 2024 at Mahmood Hall, Deoband, during a national seminar attended by over 200 scholars. The curriculum was finalized at the event, presided over by Abul Qasim Nomani and attended by Badruddin Ajmal.

MOM offers a five-year, four-stage online 'Alim course entirely in English, covering Qur'an, Hadith, Sīrah, Islamic law, theology, and comparative religion, and is open to learners aged 15 and above globally.

== Evaluation and academic impact ==
A 2017 case study of MMERC, conducted by linguist Basheek Beg, highlighted the pedagogical approach and practical outcomes of the Diploma in English Language and Literature (DELL) program. The study found that most MMERC students come from madrasa backgrounds with little to no exposure to English. Through structured classroom instruction, regular testing, and free residential facilities, the two-year DELL course helps students develop listening, speaking, reading, writing, and comprehension skills. While the report acknowledged MMERC’s social impact and language achievement, it also recommended improvements such as better utilization of resources, professionally trained teachers, and a more student-centered curriculum design.

The study emphasized that while MMERC provides comprehensive facilities including free lodging, food, and academic materials there remain areas for pedagogical improvement. For instance, although students showed notable gains in basic English skills, the study recommended revising the syllabus to better align with learner needs, enhancing teacher training, and incorporating technology such as language labs and interactive tools to improve pronunciation and communication fluency. The findings also noted that students were highly motivated to learn English primarily for career advancement, social integration, and Islamic outreach (dawah), indicating a clear alignment between personal goals and institutional objectives.

== Welfare Activities ==
MMERC also undertakes charitable projects such as providing medical aid, scholarships, disaster relief, and awareness campaigns in underserved communities.

== Inter-DELL National Elocution Competition (2015) ==
In 2015, MMERC organized the first All-India Inter-DELL National Elocution Competition in Mumbai. Participants were DELL students from multiple affiliated institutions across India. All top prizes were secured by MMERC students. The event was presided over by Badruddin Ajmal and attended by public figures including Zahir Kazi and Teesta Setalvad, who praised the initiative for promoting Islamic scholarship through English.

== Publications and Media ==
=== Eastern Crescent ===
In 2006, MMERC launched the English monthly magazine Eastern Crescent, which aims to provide Islamic perspectives on contemporary issues. The magazine includes essays, editorials, and interviews with scholars and public intellectuals.

=== Book Publications ===
In December 2016, the then Vice President of India, Mohammad Hamid Ansari, released three books published by MMERC:

- Prophet Muhammad's Life: An Introspection on Present Day Conditions – by Muddassir Ahmad Qasmi
- Common Mistakes among Muslims – English translation of Aghlatul Awam by Ashraf Ali Thanwi
- The Elevation of Woman in Islam – translated from a work by Abdus Samad Rahmani
- Madrasa Education: Its Strength and Weakness – an analytical work by Muhammadullah Khalili Qasmi, discussing the merits and challenges of traditional Islamic education in India.

== Online Services ==
MMERC operates a digital platform providing fatwas and Islamic guidance via its online Darul Ifta. Its online ecosystem includes:

- Official course website
- Markaz Media and Publications
- Eastern Crescent Magazine

== Admissions ==
Admission to MMERC programs is based on an annual entrance exam held during the Islamic month of Rajab. The process includes assessments in Islamic studies and general knowledge.

== Environmental and civic participation ==
In 2017, MMERC participated in the Versova Beach cleanup drive in Mumbai. Students joined volunteers from other schools to remove waste as part of a broader environmental awareness initiative.

== Legal proceedings ==
In May 2025, MMERC was named in a legal case involving the alleged unauthorized construction of a mosque and madrasa on a public playground in Oshiwara, Mumbai. The Bombay High Court directed the Brihanmumbai Municipal Corporation (BMC) to conduct a survey and determine the legality of the structures.

== Influence ==
MMERC has served as a model for similar programs in other Islamic seminaries, including Darul Uloom Deoband, which have incorporated English language training into their curriculum to better prepare graduates for engagement with modern society.

MMERC has also been cited in national discourse as an example of a "modern madrasa" initiative that successfully integrates English and modern subjects without compromising on traditional religious instruction. As noted in a 2015 report, the institute attracts thousands of applicants for just 25 seats in its two-year program, which begins with foundational English and culminates in exposure to classical literature, such as the works of Shakespeare. According to the report, graduates have gone on to join multinational corporations, pursue higher education at institutions like Jawaharlal Nehru University, or serve in public and private sectors.

== Alumni ==
Approximately 400 graduates have completed its programs. These alumni work as educators, translators, researchers, and public speakers across India and internationally.
