= Azimulhaq Pahalwan =

Indian politician (1962–2020)

Haji Azimulhaq Pahalwan

MLA, 16th Legislative Assembly of Uttar Pradesh
- In office 2012 – Mar. 2017
- Preceded by: Lalji Verma
- Succeeded by: Sanju Devi
- Constituency: Tanda, Ambedkar Nagar

Personal details
- Born: 25 Apr. 1962 near Hanswar, Bhulepur, Ambedkar Nagar, Uttar Pradesh, India
- Died: 5 May 2020 (aged 57–58) Bhulepur
- Party: Samajwadi Party
- Spouse: Monisha Khatoon (m. 1987)
- Children: 2 sons, 4 daughters
- Parent: Abdul Rakeeb (father)
- Education: S.Y.N.H.S. School Baskhari
- Occupation: MLA
- Profession: Agriculturist, politician

Haji Azimulhaq Pahalwan ( 25 Apr 1962 – May 2020) was an Indian politician and a member of the Sixteenth Legislative Assembly of Uttar Pradesh of India. He represented the Tanda constituency in Ambedkar Nagar from Samajwadi Party during 2012 to Mar 2017 when Akhilesh Yadav was elected as first time Chief Minister of Uttar Pradesh.

== Early life and education ==
Pahalwan was born in Bhulepur, near Hanswar, Uttar Pradesh. He attended the S.Y.N.H.S. School Baskhari and attained degrees. He died on 5 May 2020.

== Political career ==
Pahalwan was a member of the Sixteenth Legislative Assembly of Uttar Pradesh since 2012. He represented the Tanda, Ambedkar Nagar constituency and was a member of the Samajwadi Party. In 2017 general election of Uttar Pradesh Legislative Assembly, he was defeated by Bharatiya Janata Party candidate Sanju Devi with an acute margin of 1723 votes.

== Posts held ==
| # | From | To | Position | Comments |
|---|---|---|---|---|
| 01 | 2012 | 2017 | Member, 16th Legislative Assembly | |

== See also ==
- Uttar Pradesh Legislative Assembly
