= Lalji Verma =

Indian politician

Member of Parliament, Lok Sabha
- Incumbent
- Assumed office 4 June 2024
- Preceded by: Ritesh Pandey
- Constituency: Ambedkar Nagar

Cabinet Minister Government of Uttar Pradesh
- In office 13 May 2007 – 15 March 2012
- Chief Minister: Mayawati
- Ministry & Departments: Parliamentary Affairs; Finance; Medical Education
- In office 13 October 2002 – 29 August 2003
- Chief Minister: Mayawati
- Ministry & Departments: Medical Education (Allopathy)
- In office 3 May 2002 – 12 October 2002
- Chief Minister: Mayawati
- Ministry & Departments: Public Enterprises

Minister of State (Independent Charge) Government of Uttar Pradesh
- In office 21 September 1997 – 19 October 1997
- Chief Minister: Kalyan Singh
- Ministry & Departments: Jail

Member of Uttar Pradesh Legislative Assembly
- In office 11 March 2017 – 4 June 2024
- Preceded by: Shankhlal Majhi
- Succeeded by: Dharamraj Nishad
- Constituency: Katehari
- In office 17 October 1996 – 6 March 2012
- Preceded by: Masood Ahmad
- Succeeded by: Azimulhaq Pahalwan
- Constituency: Tanda
- In office 22 June 1991 – 4 December 1993
- Preceded by: Gopi Nath Verma
- Succeeded by: Masood Ahmad
- Constituency: Tanda

Member of Uttar Pradesh Legislative Council
- In office 7 July 1986 – 15 January 1991
- Constituency: elected by Legislative assembly members

Personal details
- Party: Samajwadi Party
- Other political affiliations: Bahujan Samaj Party; Janata Dal; Lok Dal
- Spouse: Shobhawati Verma
- Education: Kulbhaskar Ashram Degree College (Allahabad), Kanpur University
- Occupation: Politician

Lalji Verma (born 5 January 1955) is an Indian politician from the Samajwadi Party and former member of the Legislative Assembly. He represented Katehari Assembly constituency in 18th Uttar Pradesh Assembly. In the 2024 Indian general elections, he was elected as a Member of Parliament in the Lok Sabha as a member of Samajwadi Party.

== Biography ==
Verma was born in the village of Mohiuddinpur, in Uttar Pradesh, India, on 5 January 1955 in a Kurmi family. He completed a Master of Science on agricultural science. He is an active political and social worker and a member of the Samajwadi party.

== Personal life ==
Verma is married to Shobhawati Verma and has one son, Vikas Verma, and two daughters, Akanksha Verma, and Dr. Chhaya Verma. His son Vikas Verma committed suicide on 14 March 2018.

== Political career ==
Verma started his political career by involving himself in student politics. He became the general secretary of the Tanda student union in 1973. He also was the general secretary of Kulbhaskar Ashram Degree College, Allahabad from 1977 to 1978. He was member of Uttar Pradesh legislative council from 7 July 1986 to 15 January 1991. He has also been elected member of the Uttar Pradesh legislative assembly in 1991, 1996, 2002, 2007, 2017, and 2022.

On 3 June 2021, Mayawati expelled Verma and Ram Achal Rajbhar, another Bahujan Samaj Party leader, from the BSP for alleged anti-party activities.

== Positions held ==
Verma has held these positions so far:

- State Minister (Independent Charge) for Jail from 21 September 1997 to 19 October 1997.
- Minister for Public Enterprises from 3 May 2002 to 12 October 2002.
- Minister for Medical Education from 13 October 2002 to 29 August 2003, 17 May 2007 to 4 February 2008 & 2 May 2008 to 11 March 2012
- Minister for Handicapped Welfare from 17 May 2007 to 4 February 2008.
- Acting Chairman, Questions & Reference Committee of Uttar Pradesh Legislative Council from August 1990 to January 1991.
- Acting Chairman, Questions & Reference Committee of Uttar Pradesh Legislative Assembly in 1998–1999.
- Chairman, Joint Committee on the Public Undertakings & Corporations of U.P. Legislative Assembly in 1997–1998.
- Chairman, Committee on Government Assurances of U.P. Legislative Assembly in 1999–2001.
- Member, Business Advisory Committee of Uttar Pradesh Legislative Assembly in 1991, 1992, 2002, 2003, 2004, 2007–2008 and 2008–2009.
- Member, Panel of Presiding Members of Uttar Pradesh Legislative Assembly in 1997–1998.
- Member, Questions & Reference Committee of Uttar Pradesh Legislative Assembly in 1997–1998.
- Member, Rules Committee of Uttar Pradesh Legislative Assembly in 2002–2003, 2007–2008 and 2008–2009.
- Member, Privilege Committee of Uttar Pradesh Legislative Assembly in 2007–2008 and 2008–2009.
- Minister for Parliamentary Affairs of Uttar Pradesh in 2007 to 11 March 2012
- Minister for Finance of Uttar Pradesh in 2008 to 2012

== Candidate ==
Verma was the candidate of BSP from Sravasti for the Lok Sabha elections in 2014.

Verma was the candidate of BSP from Katehari for the Vidhan Sabha elections in 2017. Verma won the election of Vidhan Sabha from Katehari.
