= Burhanuddin Qasmi =

Indian Islamic scholar and writer (b. 1971)

Mohammad Burhanuddin Qasmi
- Born: 5 March 1971 (age 55); Kakanimara, Karimganj district, Assam, India
- Education: Darul Uloom Deoband; Markazul Maarif; Maulana Azad National Urdu University
- Occupations: Islamic scholar, writer, educator, poet
- Known for: Director of Markazul Ma'arif Education and Research Centre (MMERC), Editor of Eastern Crescent

Mohammad Burhanuddin Qasmi (born 5 March 1971), also known as MB. Qasmi or M. Burhanuddin Qasmi, is an Indian Islamic scholar, educator, writer, and poet. He is the Director of the Markazul Ma'arif Education and Research Centre (MMERC) in Mumbai, an institution that trains madrasa graduates in English language and modern disciplines. He is also the founding editor of the English monthly magazine Eastern Crescent and a regular commentator on socio-religious and political issues affecting Indian Muslims.

Qasmi has authored books and essays in English, Urdu, and Bengali, and has been an active voice in national and international forums addressing issues of education, interfaith harmony, media bias, minority rights, and the intersection of tradition and modernity in Muslim communities.

== Early life and education ==
Mohammad Burhanuddin Qasmi was born in Kakanimara village in Karimganj district, Assam, India. He acquired his Fazilat (Islamic theology degree) from Darul Uloom Deoband (1988–1994), where he studied Islamic jurisprudence, Qur'anic exegesis, Hadith, Arabic literature, and Islamic history. He later completed a Diploma in English Language and Literature from MMERC (1994–1997), and earned a Master's degree (MA) in English Literature from Maulana Azad National Urdu University (MANUU), Hyderabad, in 2011.

== Career ==
Qasmi began his career in Islamic education and journalism in the mid-1990s. After completing his English diploma at MMERC, he briefly served in 1997 as Director at the Islamic Centre in Lucknow, established by Salman Husaini Nadwi. In 1998, he was appointed as Director of the MMERC in Mumbai, an institute founded by Badruddin Ajmal to train madrasa graduates in English and modern subjects.

During his student years, Qasmi developed an interest in English journalism and launched a newsletter from the Islamic Centre in Lucknow.

He launched the English magazine Eastern Crescent in May 2006, which regularly features articles on Islamic thought, education, and contemporary socio-political issues.

He described MMERC as a unique institution that blends traditional Islamic scholarship with modern disciplines by preparing madrasa graduates in English and contemporary subjects. According to Qasmi, the goal is to enable them to engage meaningfully with the wider world while maintaining their religious identity.

In addition to his academic and editorial responsibilities, Qasmi has been active in public discourse on minority rights and national unity. He has spoken at various national and international platforms addressing issues such as secularism, extremism, and the integration of Indian Muslims into the national mainstream. He often emphasizes the need for academic and economic empowerment of the community and advocates for responsible engagement with media and civil society.

=== Educational initiatives ===
In 2010, Qasmi announced the establishment of the Markaz Universal School of Theology in Jogeshwari, Mumbai, as a project of the MMERC. The school aimed to integrate a dual curriculum combining international academic syllabi with traditional Islamic studies to attract middle-class and affluent Muslim families who otherwise did not send their children to madrasas. Qasmi stated that the goal was to offer students both religious grounding and broader career opportunities. The project was backed by survey data from 11,000 Muslim families, of whom 96 percent supported the initiative.

== Views ==
=== Terrorism and communal violence ===
Following the 2008 Mumbai attacks, Qasmi emphasized that Indian Muslims had no connection to the violence and called it a foreign act. He stated, "This is a foreign attack. It has nothing to do with Indian Muslims or Muslim violence against Hindus or Hindu violence against Muslims."

In 2011, during a rally in Mumbai's Azad Maidan, Qasmi criticized media bias in reporting on arrests of Muslims in terror-related cases. He noted that while arrests were widely reported, the eventual acquittals or releases were often ignored, calling for more responsible journalism.

In 2012, Qasmi joined other Muslim leaders in condemning violence against minorities during the Assam riots and called for decisive government action.

=== Judiciary and legal processes ===
Ahead of the 2010 Allahabad High Court verdict on the Babri Masjid–Ram Janmabhoomi dispute, Qasmi urged the community to maintain peace and faith in the judiciary. He cautioned against provocations and discouraged both protest and celebration, regardless of the verdict's outcome.

Following the verdict, Qasmi stated that the judgment was "more a reconciliation than a judgment based on merit" and criticized the court's reasoning for designating the site as Ram's birthplace.

In 2011, Qasmi condemned the arrest of IPS officer Sanjiv Bhatt, terming it political retaliation against a whistleblower. He emphasized that communal violence must be condemned, but such events should not be used to silence those who speak out.

In 2014, Qasmi clarified that Shariah courts in India operate as informal mediation forums without legal authority under the Indian Constitution.

=== Shariah courts and legal framework ===
In 2014, Qasmi clarified that Shariah courts in India operate as voluntary, community-based mechanisms for resolving personal disputes, primarily within the Muslim community. He emphasized that these forums carry no legal authority and that any aggrieved party is free to seek remedy through formal judicial channels. He described them as a misunderstood but effective system for delivering social justice in areas such as divorce, inheritance, and family matters.

=== Education and reform ===
Qasmi has consistently advocated for blending modern and traditional education. In 2013, while addressing a Quran memorization event in Hyderabad, he emphasized the importance of integrating religious learning with contemporary subjects to prepare students for current challenges.

In the same year, he criticized the Maharashtra government's madrasa modernization initiative, arguing that most Muslim children attend regular schools rather than madrasas. He called for better infrastructure and teacher availability in Urdu-medium schools instead.

=== Gender and personal law ===
In 2013, Qasmi expressed caution over the Bharatiya Muslim Mahila Andolan's initiative to establish women-led Shariah courts, questioning their religious expertise and adherence to Islamic legal standards.

In 2018, Qasmi served as coordinator for a protest of nearly 200,000 women at Mumbai's Azad Maidan against the triple talaq criminalization bill. He argued that the law was an infringement on religious autonomy and would harm rather than help Muslim women.

After the bill became law in 2019, Qasmi condemned it as a "black day" and said the move was humiliating to Indian Muslims and a direct interference in Islamic personal law.

=== Politics and secularism ===
In 2015, Qasmi released an open letter co-signed by over 200 scholars urging the reunification of Jamiat Ulema-e-Hind factions to offer unified leadership to Indian Muslims. The letter warned of rising Islamophobia and communal violence and called for coordinated resistance.

In the 2019 general election, Qasmi urged support for secular parties but criticized the Indian National Congress for not forming alliances with other like-minded groups such as AIUDF, AAP, and TMC. He warned that such disunity among secular forces would ultimately benefit communal politics.

=== Media narratives and digital engagement ===
In a 2020 interview, Qasmi reflected on the media's evolving portrayal of Muslims. He criticized the repeated labeling of Muslims as "orthodox", "extremist", or "Islamist", calling it a repackaging of old prejudices. He emphasized the importance of digital platforms in empowering Muslim scholars to challenge biased narratives and promote positive engagement through education, economic participation, and media outreach.

=== Environmental and civic engagement ===
In August 2017, under the leadership of environmental activist Afroz Shah, students from the MMERC participated in a large-scale beach clean-up drive at Versova Beach, Mumbai. The campaign involved 8,500 students from five schools and over 250 volunteers who collectively removed 160,000 kilograms of waste over the weekend. Qasmi, as Director of MMERC, stated that involving students in such civic efforts would instill in them an understanding of zero-waste principles from an early age, encouraging sustainable practices at home.

== Affiliations ==
Qasmi has been associated with several religious, educational, and humanitarian organizations in India and abroad. He serves as the Director of the MMERC in Mumbai and is the Editor of the English monthly magazine Eastern Crescent. He is also the managing director of Markaz Media and Publications Pvt. Ltd. and Director of Markaz Online Madrasa (MOM), an Islamic e-learning platform. In addition to his administrative roles, Qasmi is a member of the Governing Body of the All India Ulama Council and the executive committee of Jamiat Ulama-e-Maharashtra. He has served as a trustee of the India Wisdom Foundation and the Movement for Human Welfare. Internationally, he is affiliated as a member with Heavenly Culture, World Peace and Restoration of Light (HWPL), Seoul, South Korea.

== Literary works ==
Qasmi has authored several works across genres, including theology, history, language instruction, and poetry. He is the author of Recounting Untold History: Darul Uloom Deoband – A Heroic Struggle Against British Tyranny, which explores the anti-colonial legacy of the Deoband seminary.

In addition, Qasmi has published instructional textbooks in English language learning, including Short-Term English Learning Course (SELC) (2023) and Advanced English Conversation Course (AECC) (2023), designed primarily for madrasa graduates.

He is also the author of Seeratun Nabi: A Biography of Prophet Muhammad (2024), a concise work on the life of the Prophet aimed at general readers.

Qasmi has written extensively in English, Urdu, Hindi, and Bengali for national and international publications. His articles and essays have appeared in outlets such as The Hindu, Hindustan Times, The Indian Express, Asian Tribune, The Pioneer, Eastern Post, and The Milli Gazette.

In addition to essays and op-eds, Qasmi has composed over a hundred poems in English and Bengali, often exploring themes of faith, social justice, and personal reflection.
