= Sher Bahadur =

Sher Bahadur may refer to:

- Sher Bahadur Deuba (born 1946), Former Prime Minister of Nepal
- Sher Bahadur Kunwor, Member of Nepalese Parliament
- Sher Bahadur Thapa (1921–1944), Nepalese Victoria Cross holder
- Sher Bahadur Singh (died 2020), Indian politician
- Sher Bahadur Tamang, Nepalese politician
