= Katehari Assembly constituency =

Constituency of the Uttar Pradesh legislative assembly in India

Coordinates: 25.53°N 82.21°E

Katehari
- Constituency No. 277 for the Uttar Pradesh Legislative Assembly

Constituency details
- Country: India
- Region: North India
- State: Uttar Pradesh
- District: Ambedkar Nagar
- Lok Sabha constituency: Ambedkar Nagar
- Total electors: 3,94,267
- Reservation: None

Member of Legislative Assembly
- 18th Uttar Pradesh Legislative Assembly
- Incumbent Dharmraj Nishad
- Party: BJP
- Alliance: NDA
- Elected year: 2024
- Preceded by: Lalji Verma

Katehari Assembly constituency is a constituency of the Uttar Pradesh Legislative Assembly covering the city of Katehari in the Ambedkar Nagar district of Uttar Pradesh, India. Katehari is one of five assembly constituencies in the Ambedkar Nagar Lok Sabha constituency.

== Members of the Legislative Assembly ==
Year	Member	Party
1957	Loknath Singh	Indian National Congress
1962	Raghunath Singh	Socialist Party
1967	Ramnarayan Tripathi	Indian National Congress
1969	Bhagwati Prasad Shukla	Indian National Congress
1974	Bhagwati Prasad Shukla	Indian National Congress
1977	Ravindra Nath Tewari	Janata Party
1980	Jiya Ram Shukla	Indian National Congress (I)
1985	Ravindranath Tewari	Janata Party
1989	Ravindranath Tewari	Janata Dal
1991	Anil Kumar Tewari	Bharatiya Janata Party
1993	Ram Dev Verma	Bahujan Samaj Party
1996	Dharamraj Nishad	Bahujan Samaj Party
2002	Dharamraj Nishad	Bahujan Samaj Party
2007	Dharamraj Nishad	Bahujan Samaj Party
2012	Shankhlal Majhi	Samajwadi Party
2017	Lalji Verma	Bahujan Samaj Party
2022	Lalji Verma	Samajwadi Party
2024^	Dharmraj Nishad	Bharatiya Janata Party

^ denotes by-election

== Election results ==
Bahujan Samaj Party is the most successful political party in Katehari Assembly elections.
1. BSP (5 terms) (27.8%)
2. INC (4 terms) (22.2%)
3. BJP (2 terms) (11.1%)
4. SP (2 terms) (11.1%)
5. JP (2 terms) (11.1%)
6. INC (I) (1 term) (5.56%)
7. JD (1 term) (5.56%)
8. Socialist Party (1 term) (5.56%)

=== 2027 ===
2027 Uttar Pradesh Legislative Assembly election: Katehari
Party	Candidate	Votes	%	±%
INDIA				
NDA				
BSP				
NOTA	None of the above			
Majority				
Turnout				
gain from		Swing		

=== 2024 bypoll ===
Uttar Pradesh Legislative Assembly by-election, 2024: Katehari
Party	Candidate	Votes	%	±%
BJP	Dharmraj Nishad	104,091	45.57	New
SP	Shobhawati Verma	69,577	30.46	▼7.32
BSP	Amit Verma	41,647	18.23	▼5.39
ASP(KR)	Rajesh Kumar	5,152	2.26	▲1.87
Independent	Govind Kumar	1,650	0.72	New
NOTA	None of the Above	1,530	0.67	▲0.07
Majority		34,514	15.11	▲12
Turnout		2,28,434		
BJP gain from SP		Swing		

=== 2022 ===
2022 Uttar Pradesh Legislative Assembly election: Katehari
Party	Candidate	Votes	%	±%
SP	Lalji Verma	93,524	37.78	+18.36
NISHAD	Avadhesh Kumar	85,828	34.67	+26.68
BSP	Prateek Pandey	58,482	23.62	−12.37
NOTA	None of the above	1,492	0.6	−0.36
Majority		7,696	3.11	+0.43
Turnout		247,560	62.79	−0.54
SP gain from BSP		Swing		

=== 2017 ===
Bahujan Samaj Party candidate Lal ji Verma won in last Assembly election of 2017 Uttar Pradesh Legislative Elections defeating Bharatiya Janta Party candidate Awadhesh Kumar Dwiwedi by a margin of 6,287 votes.

2017 Uttar Pradesh Legislative Assembly Election: Katehar
Party	Candidate	Votes	%	±%
BSP	Lal Ji Verma	84,358	35.99	
BJP	Awdhesh Kumar Dwivedi	78,071	33.31	
SP	Jaishankar Pandey	45,532	19.42	
NISHAD	Ajay Pratap Singh	18,721	7.99	
NOTA	None of the above	2,235	0.96	
Majority		6,287	2.68	
Turnout		234,407	63.33	
