= Hari Om Pandey =

Indian politician

Member of Uttar Pradesh Legislative Council
- Incumbent
- Assumed office 12 April 2022
- Preceded by: Hiralal Yadav
- Constituency: Ayodhya-Ambedkarnagar Local Authorities

Member of parliament, Lok Sabha
- In office 2014–2019
- Preceded by: Rakesh Pandey
- Succeeded by: Ritesh Pandey
- Constituency: Ambedkar Nagar

Personal details
- Born: 1 August 1956 (age 69); Ambedkar Nagar, Uttar Pradesh, India
- Political party: Bharatiya Janata Party
- Spouse: Rama Pandey (m. 1975)
- Children: 4 sons
- Parents: Ram Kumar Pandey (father); Kalpana Pandey (mother)
- Education: Master of Arts; Bachelor of Education; Diploma in Physical Education
- Alma mater: Dr. Ram Manohar Lohia Avadh University, K.S. Saket P.G. College, Lucknow Christian College
- Occupation: Agriculturist

Hari Om Pandey is an Indian politician belonging to the Bharatiya Janata Party (BJP). He is currently serving as Member of Legislative Council (MLC) from Ayodhya-Ambedkarnagar Local Authorities seat.He served as the Member of the Parliament (Lok Sabha), from 2014 to 2019. He won in the 2014 Indian general elections from the Ambedkar Nagar constituency in the state of Uttar Pradesh. He defeated his nearest rival Rakesh Pandey of Bahujan Samaj Party (BSP) by a margin of 139,429 votes. He is the first person from BJP to win Ambedkar nagar constituency. He is also cousin of NRI Researcher Kaushlendra Tripathi.

== Positions held ==
- May 2014: Elected to 16th Lok Sabha
- 1 September 2014 onwards: Member, Standing Committee on Human Resource Development; Member, Consultative Committee, Ministry of Youth Affairs and Sports
