= Rakesh Pandey (UP politician) =

Indian politician (born 1952)

Member (MLA) of Uttar Pradesh Legislative Assembly
- Incumbent
- Assumed office 2022
- Preceded by: Subhash Rai
- In office 2002–2007
- Preceded by: Sher Bahadur Singh
- Succeeded by: Sher Bahadur Singh
- Constituency: Jalalpur

Member of Parliament in Lok Sabha
- In office 2009–2014
- Preceded by: Constituency established
- Succeeded by: Hari Om Pandey
- Constituency: Ambedkar Nagar

Personal details
- Born: 14 August 1952 (age 73) Kotwa Mohamadpur, Uttar Pradesh, India
- Party: Samajwadi Party (January 2022 - present)
- Other political affiliations: Bahujan Samaj Party (till January 2022)
- Spouse: Manju Pandey (m. 1971)
- Relations: Pawan Pandey (younger brother)
- Children: 2 (including Ritesh Pandey)
- Profession: Agriculturist
- As of 30 July, 2019

Rakesh Pandey (born 14 August 1952) is an Indian politician and a member of the 18th Uttar Pradesh Assembly from Jalalpur as a Samajwadi Party candidate. He was a Member of Parliament in the 15th Lok Sabha from Ambedkar Nagar as a Bahujan Samaj Party (BSP) candidate. From 2002 to 2007, he was a MLA in the Uttar Pradesh Legislative Assembly. In January 2022, Pandey left Bahujan Samaj Party and joined Samajwadi Party.

== Personal life ==
Pandey was born in Kotwa Mohamadpur in Ambedkar Nagar district of Uttar Pradesh to Jagmohan Pandey and Raghuraji Devi. He studied till matriculation and is an agriculturalist by profession. Pandey married Manju Pandey on 29 June 1971. They have two sons. His younger son, Ritesh Pandey is an MP from the Ambedkar Nagar constituency. His older son, Ashish Pandey is a Lucknow based real estate businessman.

== Political career ==
Pandey was a member in the Uttar Pradesh Legislative Assembly from 2002 to 2007. As a Bahujan Samaj Party politician, he was a Member of Parliament in the 15th Lok Sabha from Ambedkar Nagar from 2007 to 2014.

In January 2022, Pandey left Bahujan Samaj Party and joined Samajwadi Party. Subsequently, Pandey won from the Jalalpur constituency in the 2022 Uttar Pradesh Legislative Assembly election, defeating Bahujan Samaj Party's Rajesh Singh by a margin of 13,630 votes.
