= Ram Achal Rajbhar =

Indian politician

- राम अचल राजभर

Member of the Uttar Pradesh Legislative Assembly
- Incumbent
- Assumed office 11 March 2017
- Preceded by: Ram Murti Verma
- Constituency: Akbarpur
- In office 1993–2012
- Preceded by: Pawan Pandey
- Succeeded by: Ram Murti Verma
- Constituency: Akbarpur

Minister of State, Government of Uttar Pradesh
- In office 13 May 2007 – 15 March 2012
- Cabinet: Mayawati - IV
- Ministry and Departments: Transport

Personal details
- Born: 15 January 1955 (age 71) Kayamuddinpur Sheikhpura, Uttar Pradesh
- Party: Samajwadi Party
- Other political affiliations: Bahujan Samaj Party
- Spouse: Bhanmati Rajbhar (died)
- Parent: Ram Avadh Rajbhar (father)
- Education: B.N.K.P.G. College, Akbarpur, Ambedkar Nagar

Ram Achal Rajbhar is an Indian politician and currently a member of Samajwadi Party. He is a five-time MLA from Uttar Pradesh Legislative Assembly.

== Personal life ==
Rajbhar was born on 15 January 1955 in Kayamuddinpur, Sheikhpura, Uttar Pradesh. His father was Ram Avadh Rajbhar. He received his graduate degree at B.N.K.P.G. College, Akbarpur, Ambedkar Nagar, and graduated in 1978. He married Bhanmati Rajbhar. After his wife's death, he founded the Bhanmati Smarak Mahavidyalaya in 2009, a college which was named in memory of her. Rajbhar has a son, Sanjay Rajbhar.

== Political career ==
Rajbhar contested the Akbarpur Assembly Constituency in 1993 on the Bahujan Samaj Party ticket, defeating incumbent Pawan Kumar Pandey of the Shiv Sena. Rajbhar, afterwards, also won the elections in 1996, 2002, and 2007, remaining MLA of Akbarpur until he was denied the Bahujan Samah Party ticket by Mayawati in 2012 due to corruption charges against him. Rajbhar's son, Sanjay Rajbhar, ran in his place in the 2012 elections, but was defeated by Ram Murti Verma.

From 2005 to 2014, Rajbhar served as the Bahujan Samaj Party's Uttarakhand in-charge. After a three year interim, Rajbhar once again resumed his role as the party's Uttarakhand in-charge in 2017.

From 2007 to 2012, Rajbhar served in the Fourth Mayawati ministry as Minister of State in the transport department. As transport minister, he launched an initiative against non-tax paying commercial vehicles. Rajbhar faced allegations of corruption for his tenure as transport minister, with the Lokayukta of Uttar Pradesh recommending the prosecution of Rajbhar for money laundering and amassing assets through the misuse his position.

On 11 July 2012 Rajbhar was appointed president of the Bahujan Samaj Party's Uttar Pradesh unit by Mayawati, replacing the previous president, Swami Prasad Maurya. Shortly after his appointment, Rajbhar stated that his goal as UP president would be to strengthen the party at the divisional and grassroots levels in and to consolidate the party's support base in preparation for the 2014 Lok Sabha elections, with the intention of getting Mayawati to reach Delhi. Rajbhar remained president of the Uttar Pradesh unit until he was replaced as president by R. S. Kushwaha in May 2018.

Rajbhar once again contested from the Akbarpur assembly constituency as a Bahujan Samaj Party candidate in the 2017 Uttar Pradesh Legislative Assembly election and won the seat by defeating Samajwadi Party's Ram Murti Verma by a margin of 14,013, serving as an MLA in the assembly from 2017 to 2022.

In May 2018, Mayawati appointed Ram Achal Rajbhar to the position of the national general secretary of the Bahujan Samaj Party.

On 3 June 2021, Rajbhar, alongside Lalji Verma, were expelled from the Bahujan Samaj Party by Mayawati for alleged anti-party activities during panchayat-level elections that had ended shortly beforehand. Rajbhar in particular was accused by the Bahujan Samaj Party of meeting with Samajwadi Party leaders. This expulsion marked the end of Rajbhar's nearly 35 years with the Bahujan Samaj Party, and he would operate as an independent for the next several months. On November 7 of the same year, both Rajbhar and Verma formally joined the Samajwadi Party after both men decided that the Samajwadi Party was the only viable alternative to the Bharatiya Janata Party in Uttar Pradesh.

As a member of the Samajwadi Party, Rajbhar contested from Akbarpur in the 2022 Uttar Pradesh Legislative Assembly election and emerged victorious in this seat by 12,000 votes, beating BJP candidate Dharamraj Nishad by a margin of 12,455 votes.

=== Legal issues ===
On 20 July 2016, Daya Shankar Singh, vice-president of the Bharatiya Janata Party in Uttar Pradesh, criticized Mayawati, analogizing her allocation of the party ticket to the highest bidder to the act of prostitution. The next day, on the 21st, the Bharatiya Janata Party sacked Singh from all of his posts in the party. That same day, in retaliation to Singh's remarks, various Bahujan Samaj Party members led a protest in Hazratganj, with slogans of "present Daya Shankar Singh's daughter" ("दयाशंकर सिंह की बेटी को पेश करो") and "present Daya Shankar Singh's sister" ("दयाशंकर सिंह की बहन को पेश करो") being raised by protesters. Mayawati defended these slogans, stating that they were intended to "make them realize the pain of abuse" and to make the Singh family realize that Mayawati was "also the sister and daughter of someone". On the 22nd, the mother of Singh filed a first information report (FIR), accusing various Bahujan Samaj Party leaders, including Ram Achal Rajbhar, Mevalal Gautam, Atar Singh Rao, Naushad Ali, and Naseemuddin Siddiqui, of making indecent remarks towards Daya Shankar Singh's female relatives, including his daughter, wife, and mother, during the protests that had occurred the day before. Singh's wife later demanded that POCSO Act charges be included in the charges against the accused for their alleged derogatory comments against Singh's at the time twelve-year-old daughter, resulting in the police adding POCSO charges against the Bahujan Samaj Party leaders in addition to the existing charges against them. Two years later, on 12 January 2018, a charge sheet was filed against Rajbhar and the other accused Bahujan Samaj Party leaders. Another two years later, on 21 October 2020, Rajbhar, Gautam, Rao, and Ali all were declared fugitives and had arrest warrants issued against them. Rajbhar, alongside Naseemuddin Siddiqui, were arrested in January 2021, remaining in jail for an eight day period, starting from 19 January to until they were granted bail on 27 January. The POCSO Act charges were later dropped against Mewalal Gautam, but were not dropped against Rajbhar, Rao, Ali, and Siddiqui because they, unlike Gautam, had not challenged the trial court's orders in the High Court.
