= Tanda Assembly constituency =

Constituency of the Uttar Pradesh legislative assembly in India

Coordinates: 26.55°N 82.66°E

Tanda
- Constituency No. 278 for the Uttar Pradesh Legislative Assembly

Constituency details
- Country: India
- Region: North India
- State: Uttar Pradesh
- District: Ambedkar Nagar
- Lok Sabha constituency: Ambedkar Nagar
- Total electors: 3,29,754
- Reservation: None

Member of Legislative Assembly
- 18th Uttar Pradesh Legislative Assembly
- Incumbent Ram Murti Verma
- Party: Samajwadi Party
- Elected year: 2022

Tanda is a constituency of the Uttar Pradesh Legislative Assembly covering the town of Tanda in the Ambedkar Nagar district of Uttar Pradesh, India. It is one of five assembly constituencies in the Ambedkar Nagar Lok Sabha constituency. Since 2008, this assembly constituency is numbered 278 amongst 403 constituencies.

As of March 2022, this seat belongs to Samajwadi Party candidate Ram Murti Verma who won in last Assembly election of 2022 Uttar Pradesh Legislative Elections defeating BJP candidate Kapil Deo Verma by a margin of 31,491 votes.

== Members of Legislative Assembly ==
Year	Member	Party
1952	Ram Sumer	Indian National Congress
1952	Mohammad Nasir	Indian National Congress
1957	Jai Ram Varma	Indian National Congress
1957	Sukh Ram	Indian National Congress
1962	Jai Ram Varma	Indian National Congress
1967	Ram Chandra Azad	Indian National Congress
1969	Ram Chandra Azad	Bharatiya Kranti Dal
1970^	Jai Ram Varma	Bharatiya Kranti Dal
1974	Nisar Ahmad Ansari	Indian National Congress
1977	Abdul Hafeez	Janata Party
1980	Gopi Nath Verma	Janata Party (Secular)
1985	Jai Ram Varma	Indian National Congress
1988^	Gopi Nath Verma	Lokdal
1989	Gopi Nath Verma	Janata Dal
1991	Lalji Verma	Janata Dal
1993	Masood Ahmad	Bahujan Samaj Party
1996	Lalji Verma	Bahujan Samaj Party
2002	Lalji Verma	Bahujan Samaj Party
2007	Lalji Verma	Bahujan Samaj Party
2012	Azimulhaq Pahalwan	Samajwadi Party
2017	Sanju Devi	Bharatiya Janata Party
2022	Ram Murti Verma	Samajwadi Party

== Election results ==
=== 2027 ===
2027 Uttar Pradesh Legislative Assembly election: Tandi
Party	Candidate	Votes	%	±%
INDIA				
NDA				
BSP				
NOTA	None of the above			
Majority				
Turnout				
gain from		Swing		

=== 2022 ===
2022 Uttar Pradesh Legislative Assembly election: Tanda
Party	Candidate	Votes	%	±%
SP	Ram Murti Verma	95,263	43.49	▲7.98
BJP	Kapil Deo	63,166	28.84	▼7.51
BSP	Shabana Khatoon	45,222	20.64	▼3.44
AIMIM	Irfan Ahmad	7,442	3.4	▲2.39
NOTA	None of the above	1,211	0.55	▼0.2
Majority		32,097	14.65	▲13.81
Turnout		219,050	66.43	▼1.0
SP gain from BJP		Swing		

=== 2017 ===
2017 Uttar Pradesh Legislative Assembly Election: Tand
Party	Candidate	Votes	%	±%
BJP	Sanju Devi	74,768	36.35	
SP	Azeemul Haq Pahalwan	73,043	35.51	
BSP	Manoj Kumar Verma	49,526	24.08	
AIMIM	Irfan Pathan	2,070	1.01	
NOTA	None of the above	1,530	0.75	
Majority		1,725	0.84	
Turnout		205,700	67.43	

=== Summary ===
Year	Constituency Name	Winner	Party	Votes	Runner up	Party	Votes	Margin
2022	Tanda	Ram Murti Verma	SP	94442	Kapil Deo Verma	BJP	62951	31491
2017	Tanda	Sanju Devi	BJP	74768	Azimulhaque Paglwan	SP	73043	1725
2012	Tanda	Azimulhaque Pahlwan	SP	83249	Ajay Kumar Alias Vishal Verma	BSP	55728	27521
2007	Tanda	Lal Ji Verma	BSP	65365	Azimul Huqe Pahalwan	SP	62910	2455
2002	Tanda	Laljee Verma	BSP	67376	Azeemul Haq Pahalwan	SP	56887	10489
1996	Tanda	Lalji Verma	BSP	55960	Jamirul Hasan Ansari	SP	54302	1658
1993	Tanda	Dr. Masood Ahmad	BSP	61374	Keshav Ram Verma	BJP	40202	21172
1991	Tanda	Lal Ji Verma	JD	40614	Sheo Pujan Verma	BJP	26983	13631
1989	Tanda	Gopi Nath Verma	JD	42308	Ram Abhilakh	INC	29782	12526
1988	Tanda	G.Nath	LKD	40783	M.A.Kidwai	INC	34988	5795
1985	Tanda	Jai Ram Verma	INC	26271	Gopi Nath Verma	LKD	21156	5115
1980	Tanda	Gopi Nath Verma	JNP(SC)	25734	Nisar Ahmad Ansari	INC(I)	25682	52
1977	Tanda	Abdul Hafeez	JNP	29000	Jai Ram Verma	INC	25350	3650
1974	Tanda	Nisar Ahmad Ansari	INC	34153	Ram Chandra Azad	BKD	25941	8212
1970	Tanda	J.R.Verma	BKD	33114	R.N.Tripathi	IND	17532	15582
1969	Tanda	Ram Chandra Azad	BKD	22995	Mukhtar Ammad	INC	21312	1683
1967	Tanda	R. C. Azad	INC	27121	S. Singh	BJS	14809	12312
1962	Tanda	Jai Ram Varma	INC	27779	Satya Narain	IND	17798	9981
1957	Tanda	Sukh Ram	INC	30296	Badal Ram	IND	21029	9267
1957	Tanda	Jai Ram Varma	INC	39685	Jeet Bahadur Singh	PSP	21077	18608
