= K.S. Saket P.G. College =

College in Uttar Pradesh, India

- Type: Government aided college
- Established: 26 July 1951; 75 years ago
- Founders: Acharya Narendra Deva; Baba Raghav Das; Parmeshwar Nath Sapru
- Accreditation: NAAC B++
- Affiliations: Dr. Ram Manohar Lohia Awadh University
- Chairman: Shailendra Mohan Pratap Mishra
- President: Deep Krishna Verma
- Principal: Prof (Dr) Danpati Tiwari
- Location: Ayodhya, Uttar Pradesh, India; 26.7853°N 82.1872°E
- Campus: Urban
- Nickname: Saket College
- Website: kssaketpgcollege.ac.in

K.S. Saket P.G. College (Full name: Kamtaprasad Sunderlal Post Graduate College) is a government-aided college located on National Highway 28 between Faizabad and Ayodhya. The college is affiliated to Dr. Ram Manohar Lohia Awadh University.

== History ==
K. S. Saket Post Graduation College was established in the year 1951. The institution was established to meet with its goal of empowering the youths with higher education.

== Notable alumni ==
- R. K. Chaudhary
- Brij Bhushan Sharan Singh
- Hari Om Pandey

== Programmes ==
=== Undergraduate ===
- Bachelor of Arts (B.A)
- Bachelor of Science (B.Sc.)
- Bachelor of Commerce (B.Com.)
- Bachelor of Computer Application (B.C.A.)
- Bachelor of Education (B.Ed.)
- Legum Baccalaureus (LL.B.)

=== Postgraduate ===
- Master of Arts (M.A)
- Master of Commerce (M.Com.)
- Master of Science (M.Sc.)
