= Bashir Badr =

Indian poet (1935–2026)

Professor Bashir Badr
- Born: Syed Muhammad Bashir; 15 February 1935; Faizabad, United Provinces of Agra and Oudh, British India (in modern-day Bukiya near Hanswar, Ambedkar Nagar, Uttar Pradesh, India)
- Died: 28 May 2026 (aged 91); Bhopal, Madhya Pradesh, India
- Education: M.A, PhD in Urdu Literature
- Alma mater: Aligarh Muslim University
- Occupations: Poet, Professor, writer
- Spouse: Rahat Badr
- Relatives: Nusrat Badr (son)
- Writing career
- Genre: Ghazal
- Subjects: Love, Philosophy
- Website: www.bashirbadr.com

Bashir Badr (born Syed Muhammad Bashir; 15 February 1935 – 28 May 2026) was an Indian poet born in Bukiya village near Hanswar in present-day Ambedkar Nagar district, Uttar Pradesh. He taught Urdu at the Aligarh Muslim University. He primarily wrote in the Urdu language, particularly ghazals. He also wrote a couplet titled Dushmani Jam Kar Karo in 1972 during Shimla Agreement that revolves around the partition of India. Most of Badr's unpublished literary work, including an uncertain number of poems was lost during the 1987 Meerut communal riots, and later he moved to Bhopal, Madhya Pradesh.

== Early life and education ==
Badr was born in Bukiya near Hanswar, Ambedkar Nagar, Uttar Pradesh, India) on 15 February 1935. After he did his early schooling, he attended the Aligarh Muslim University where he did his Bachelor of Arts, Master of Arts and PhD. Later, he served at the same university as a lecturer. He also served at Meerut College for over seventeen years.

After his property, including his house and books, was damaged in the 1987 Meerut violence, he permanently moved to Bhopal.

== Career ==
Badr started writing poems at the age of seven. He wrote some collections of ghazals titled Ikai, Kulliyate Bashir Badr, Aamad, Image, Aahat and Devanagari script ghazals titled Ujale Apni Yadon Ke. During his career, he wrote two books titled Azadi Ke Bad Urdu Ghazal Ka Tanqidi Mutala (Critical study of Urdu ghazal after independence) and Biswin Sadi Mein Ghazal (Ghazals in 20th century) focused on literary criticism.

He also served at the Bihar Urdu Academy as a chairman.

== Influence on politics ==
His couplets appear to have had an influence on Indian politicians, and are sometimes quoted in the parliament of India by the leaders such as prime minister of India Narendra Modi and 2014's prime minister candidate of Congress Rahul Gandhi. In 1972, his couplet was quoted by Zulfikar Ali Bhutto.

== Later life and death ==
Badr later suffered from dementia and was believed to have forgotten his Mushaira years as a result.

Badr died in Bhopal on 28 May 2026, at the age of 91.

== Awards ==
Badr received the Padma Shri award in 1999 for contribution towards literature and Sangeet Natak Akademi. He also received the Sahitya Akademi Award in Urdu for his poetry collection "Aas" in 1999.

== Legacy ==
Badr is one of the most quoted shayars in Indian pop-culture.

A popular radio show Ujaale Apni Yaadon Ke on Vividh Bharti derives its title from one of Badr's most popular sher.

Ujāle apnī yādoñ ke hamāre saath rahne do
Na jaane kis galī meñ zindagī kī shaam ho jaae
(Let the light of your memories stay with me
Who knows in which lonely lane the evening of life may fall)

The 2015 film Masaan contains various examples of poetry and shaayari by Basheer Badr, along with works by Akbar Allahabadi, Chakbast, Mirza Ghalib and Dushyant Kumar. Explaining this as a conscious tribute, the film's lyrics writer Varun Grover explained that he wanted to show the character of Shaalu (played by Shweta Tripathi) as a person whose hobby is to read Hindi poetry and shaayari, as this is a common hobby of Millennial and Generation X youngsters in Northern India, especially when in love, but this aspect is rarely shown in Hindi films.
