= Ram Murti Verma =

Indian politician

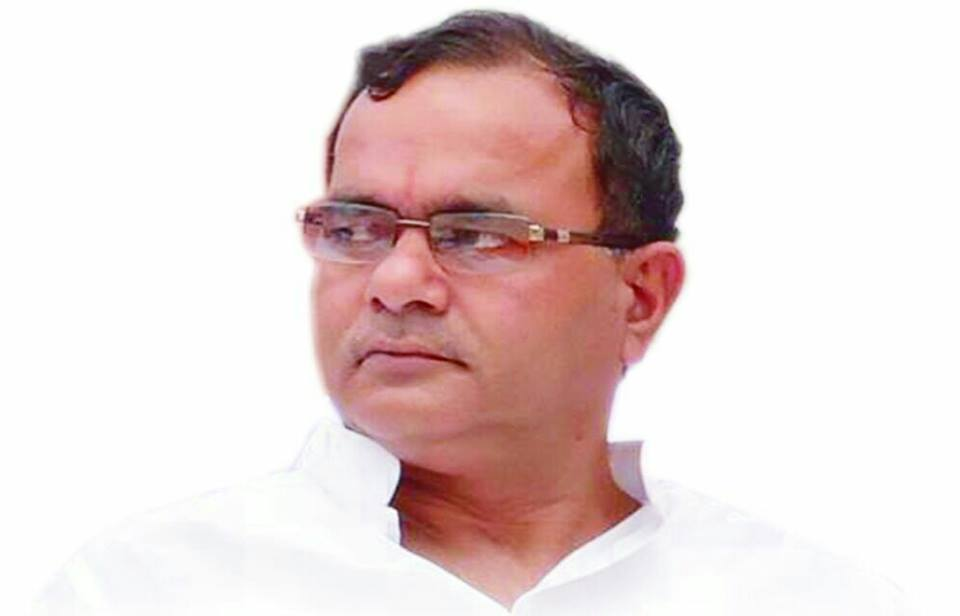

MLA, 18th Legislative Assembly
- Incumbent
- Assumed office 10 March 2022
- Preceded by: Sanju Devi
- Constituency: Tanda

MLA, 16th Legislative Assembly
- In office March 2012 – March 2017
- Preceded by: Ram Achal Rajbhar
- Succeeded by: Ram Achal Rajbhar
- Constituency: Akbarpur

Personal details
- Born: 1 January 1965 (age 61) Dohripur, Uttar Pradesh, India
- Party: Samajwadi Party
- Spouse: Sudama Devi (m. 1984)
- Children: 2
- Profession: Agriculturist; politician

Ram Murti Verma (born 1 January 1965) is an Indian politician and former Minister of Milk and Dairy development in the Uttar Pradesh government under Akhilesh Yadav ministry. As a member of the Samajwadi Party, Verma represents the Tanda constituency in the 18th Legislative Assembly of Uttar Pradesh. Before that, he represented the Akbarpur constituency in the Sixteenth Legislative Assembly of Uttar Pradesh.

== Early life and education ==
Verma was born on 1 January 1965 to Vasudev Verma in Dohripur village of Ambedkar Nagar district in the state of Uttar Pradesh. He enrolled for bachelor's degree but did not complete his education. Verma married Sudama Devi in 1984, with whom he has two sons. Verma is an agriculturist by occupation.

== Political career ==
A member of the Samajwadi Party, Verma won from the Akbarpur assembly constituency in the 2012 Uttar Pradesh Legislative Assembly election, serving as an MLA in the assembly from 2012 to 2017, before losing in 2017 by a small margin.

In 2022 Uttar Pradesh Legislative Assembly election, Verma contested from the Tanda constituency instead of Akbarpur and won by 41,989 votes, defeating Bharatiya Janta Party's Kapil Deo Verma with margin of 32097 votes.

Verma had also served thrice as the district president of the Samajwadi Party. He also contested in the 2014 Lok Sabha election from Ambedkar Nagar constituency.
