= National Loktantrik Party =

Indian political party

- Abbreviation: NLP
- President: Dr.Suhail Chaudhary
- Founders: Masood Ahmad
- Founded: 15 Dec 1995; 30 years ago
- ECI Status: Registered

The National Loktantrik Party (NLP; English: National Democratic Party) is a political party in India. It was formed on 15 December 1995 by Dr. Masood Ahmad. The party had an MP in the Lok Sabha named Baleshwar Yadav from Padrauna Lok Sabha in 14th Lok Sabha.
