= Ravindranath Tewari =

Indian politician

Ravindranath Tiwari was a politician from Ayodhya, Uttar Pradesh who was elected for the Katehari Assembly constituency. He was a cabinet minister in the government of Uttar Pradesh during the chief ministership of Mulayam Singh Yadav.
