= Subhash Rai =

Indian politician

Member (MLA) of Uttar Pradesh Legislative Assembly
- In office Oct 2019 – Mar 2022
- Preceded by: Ritesh Pandey
- Succeeded by: Rakesh Pandey
- Constituency: Jalalpur

Personal details
- Party: Samajwadi party

Subhash Rai is an Indian politician in the Samajwadi Party. He was elected as a member of the Uttar Pradesh Legislative Assembly from Jalalpur on 24 October 2019.
