= Jalalpur Assembly constituency =

Constituency of the Uttar Pradesh legislative assembly in India

Coordinates: 26.31°N 82.74°E

Jalalpur
- Constituency No. 280 for the Uttar Pradesh Legislative Assembly

Constituency details
- Country: India
- Region: North India
- State: Uttar Pradesh
- District: Ambedkar Nagar
- Lok Sabha constituency: Ambedkar Nagar
- Total electors: 4,07,064
- Reservation: None

Member of Legislative Assembly
- 18th Uttar Pradesh Legislative Assembly
- Incumbent Rakesh Pandey
- Party: Samajwadi Party
- Elected year: 2022
- Preceded by: Subhash Rai

Jalalpur is a constituency of the Uttar Pradesh Legislative Assembly covering the city of Jalalpur in the Ambedkar Nagar district of Uttar Pradesh, India.

Jalalpur is one of five assembly constituencies in the Ambedkar Nagar Lok Sabha constituency. Since 2008, this assembly constituency is numbered 280 amongst 403 constituencies.

== Members of Legislative Assembly ==
Bahujan Samaj Party is the most successful political party in Jalalpur Assembly elections.
1. BSP (5 terms) (31.2%)
2. SP (4 terms) (25.0%)
3. CPI(M) (2 terms) (12.5%)
4. Independent (2 terms) (12.5%)
5. INC (1 term) (6.25%)
6. INC (I) (1 term) (6.25%)
7. BJP (1 term) (6.25%)

Year	Member	Party
1967	Jagdamba Prasad	Independent
1969	Jagdamba Prasad	Indian National Congress
1974	Bhagwati Prasad	Communist Party of India (Marxist)
1977	Bhagwati Prasad	Communist Party of India (Marxist)
1980	Sher Bahadur Singh	Indian National Congress (I)
1985	Sher Bahadur Singh	Independent
1989	Ram Lakhan Verma	Bahujan Samaj Party
1991	Ram Lakhan Verma	Bahujan Samaj Party
1993	Ram Lakhan Verma	Bahujan Samaj Party
1996	Sher Bahadur Singh	Bharatiya Janata Party
2002	Rakesh Pandey	Samajwadi Party
2007	Sher Bahadur Singh	Bahujan Samaj Party
2012	Sher Bahadur Singh	Samajwadi Party
2017	Ritesh Pandey	Bahujan Samaj Party
2019^	Subhash Rai	Samajwadi Party
2022	Rakesh Pandey	Samajwadi Party

== Election results ==
=== 2027 ===
2027 Uttar Pradesh Legislative Assembly election: Jalalpur
Party	Candidate	Votes	%	±%
INDIA				
NDA				
BSP	Dayaram Rajbhar			
NOTA	None of the above			
Majority				
Turnout				
gain from		Swing		

=== 2022 ===
2022 Uttar Pradesh Legislative Assembly election: Jalalpur
Party	Candidate	Votes	%	±%
SP	Rakesh Pandey	93,668	36.18	▲4.58
BSP	Rajesh Singh	80,038	30.91	▼0.34
BJP	Subhash Rai	71,236	27.52	▼0.07
VIP	Nitesh Kumar	2,410	0.93	
NOTA	None of the above	1,399	0.54	▲0.08
Majority		13,630	5.27	▲4.92
Turnout		258,897	63.6	▲5.20
SP hold		Swing		

=== 2019 bypoll ===
UP By-election, 2019: Jalalpur
Party	Candidate	Votes	%	±%
SP	Subhash Rai	72,611	31.60	+7.19
BSP	Chhaya Verma	71,821	31.25	−6.26
BJP	Rajesh Singh	63,405	27.59	−4.50
SBSP	Ravikant	9,040	3.93	
Independent	Murad Ali	2,953	1.29	
INC	Sunil Mishra	2,521	1.10	
NOTA	None of the above	1,055	0.46	−0.18
Majority		790	0.35	−5.07
Turnout		229,797	58.40	−4.26
SP gain from BSP		Swing		

=== 2017 ===
Ritesh Pandey won in last Assembly election of 2017 Uttar Pradesh Legislative Elections defeating Bharatiya Janta Party candidate Rajesh Singh by a margin of 13,030 votes.

2017 Uttar Pradesh Legislative Assembly election: Jalalpur
Party	Candidate	Votes	%	±%
BSP	Ritesh Pandey	90,309	37.51	
BJP	Rajesh Singh	77,279	32.09	
SP	Shankhilal Majhi	58,773	24.41	
NOTA	None of the above	1,531	0.64	
Majority		13,030	5.42	
Turnout		240,787	62.66	
BSP gain from SP		Swing		
