= Ram Avadh =

Indian politician (born 1927)

Member of Parliament, Lok Sabha
- In office 1989–1996
- Preceded by: Ram Pyare Suman
- Succeeded by: Ghanshyam Kharwar
- In office 1980–1984
- Preceded by: Mangal Dev Visharad
- Succeeded by: Ram Pyare Suman
- Constituency: Akbarpur

Personal details
- Born: 1 May 1927 Rampurka,Faizabad district, United Provinces, British India(present-day Uttar Pradesh, India)
- Party: Janata Dal
- Spouse: Saraswati Devi

Ram Avadh (born 1 May 1927) was an Indian politician. He was elected to the Lok Sabha, the lower house of the Parliament of India, as a member of the Janata Dal.
