= Masood Ahmad =

Indian politician

Member of the Legislative Assembly, Uttar Pradesh
- In office 4 December 1993 – 28 October 1995
- Constituency: Tanda

Minister of Education Government of Uttar Pradesh
- In office 5 December 1993 – 3 June 1995

Personal details
- Born: 1953 (age 72–73) Pirthivipur near Hanswar, Ambedkar Nagar
- Party: Indian National Congress
- Education: AMU Aligarh
- Occupation: MLA
- Profession: Politician

Dr. Masood Ahmad is an Indian politician and a member of 1993 Legislative Assembly of Tanda, Uttar Pradesh of India. He represented the Tanda, Ambedkar Nagar constituency of Uttar Pradesh and was a state President of Rashtriya Lok Dal of Uttar Pradesh since August 2016 to March 2022. He was former Education Minister of Uttar Pradesh in 1993.

== Political career ==
Born in 1953 in Pirthivipur near Hanswar, Uttar Pradesh, Masood Ahmad received a doctorate in history (Ph.D.) from Aligarh Muslim University. He met Manyavar Kashiram during the DS4 and BAMCEF days.

Masood thereafter became a trusted aide of Manyavar Kahsiram and also became the founder member of Bahujan Samajwadi Party. He fought elections from various constituencies but tasted his first success in 1993 when he won on assembly BSP ticket from Tanda, Ambedkar Nagar.

He also became the Cabinet Minister of education with all three basic, middle and upper departments. He played a key role in formulating education policy and promoting Urdu through recruitment and otherwise in the brief spell of six months when he was a minister.

Masood resigned from the ministry in a dramatic fashion due to differences with party members. Thereafter he founded the National Loktantrik Party and spent two decades in struggle for the minority and Dalit cause. He was successful in getting elected several MLAs and MPs from his party. His party base and cadre stretched from the farms of Western Uttar Pradesh to the villages in Eastern UP to the parched lands of Bundelkhand. In 2015 he joined the Rashtriya Lok Dal to strengthen Ajit Singh and Jayant Chaudhary in their struggle for the farmers, dalits, obc, Muslim and development cause. He became the national spokesperson and then the general secretary of the party. He began a new inning in September 2016 after national president Ajit Singh handed over to him the important responsibility of the state unit chief.

On 19 March 2022, Ahmad resigned from Rashtriya Lok Dal's primary membership and post.

On 8 August 2022, Ahmad has joined the Indian National Congress along with his supporters.

== Education ==
He got his early education from their home town then they shifted to Aligarh for higher education, where he did graduation and post graduation from AMU in political science after that he completed his PhD in same field.

== Posts held ==
#	From	To	Position	Comments
01	1993	1995	Member, 1993 Uttar Pradesh Legislative Assembly election	

== See also ==
- Uttar Pradesh Legislative Assembly
