= Ramji Ram =

Indian politician (born 1931)

Member of Parliament, Lok Sabha
- In office 1967–1977
- Preceded by: Panna Lal
- Succeeded by: Mangal Dev Visharad
- Constituency: Akbarpur

Personal details
- Born: 17 January 1931 Tanda,Faizabad, United Provinces, British India(present-day Uttar Pradesh, India)
- Party: Indian National Congress
- Other political affiliations: Republican Party of India
- Spouse(s): Ramaw Devi and Manraji Dev

Ramji Ram (born 17 January 1931) was an Indian politician. He was elected to the Lok Sabha, the lower house of the Parliament of India, as a member of the Indian National Congress.
