= Tanda, Ambedkar Nagar =

Town in Uttar Pradesh, India

Tanda
- Town
- Location in Uttar Pradesh, India Tanda (India)
- Coordinates: 26.55°N 82.65°E
- Country: India
- State: Uttar Pradesh
- Division: Ayodhya
- District: Ambedkar Nagar
- Elevation: 78 m (256 ft)

Population (2011)
  - Total: 95,516

Language
  - Official: Hindi
  - Additional official: Urdu
  - Regional: Awadhi
- Time zone: UTC+5:30 (IST)
- PIN: 224190
- Vehicle registration: UP-45

Tanda is a town in Ambedkar Nagar district in the Indian state of Uttar Pradesh situated on the banks of Ghaghara River. It is a nagar palika parishad and is part of Ayodhya division in Uttar Pradesh. The town is situated 20 kilometres (12 mi) north east from district headquarter Akbarpur. Tanda is also a tehsil in the district. It has one of the largest handloom weaving industries for manufacturing varieties like gamchha, lungi, polyester clothing, check-shirt clothes material in state of Uttar Pradesh.

== History ==
Tanda has a rich historical background. It used to be a barren land until the Mughal Emperor Farrukhsiyar asked Raja Syed Mohammad Hayat to make a civilisation on the bank of the Ghaghara river in 1714 A.D. The royal estate of Tanda stretched from the borders of old Awadh State to the borders of Bihar.

Before Indian Rebellion of 1857, Tanda’s then Raja Syed Hussain Ali, with his brother Raja Syed Abbas Ali, stood against British army troops, which were moving towards Delhi, and fought a fierce battle in which many of the Estate’s soldiers died. It was Raja Syed Mohammad Raza who by his virtue of intelligence was able to hold on the legacy.Raja Syed Hussain Abbas continues with the legacy. Today Raja Syed Kazim Raza and holds the heritage.(the only legal heir)

== Demographics ==
According to the 2011 census of India, the Tanda Nagar Palika Parishad had a population of 95,516, of which 49,429 were males while 46,087 were females. The population of children in the age range 0-6 was 12,090 which is 12.66% of total population of Tanda. The total number of literates in Tanda was 64,736, which constituted 67.8% of the population with male literacy of 71.5% and female literacy of 63.8%. The effective literacy rate of 7+ population of Tanda was 77.6%, of which male literacy rate was 81.8% and female literacy rate was 73.1%. The Scheduled Castes and Scheduled Tribes population was 7,094 and 3 respectively. Tanda had 14597 households in 2011.

The most commonly spoken languages are Hindi, Awadhi and Urdu.

== Government and politics ==
=== Administration ===
As of 2022, Ram Murti Verma from Samajwadi Party is the MLA in the Uttar Pradesh Legislative Assembly representing Tanda constituency of Uttar Pradesh Legislative Assembly.

Lalji Verma, Ex-MLA Ex-minister of Uttar Pradesh Govternment hails from the same constituency. Dr. Masood Ahmad was the education minister from Prithvipur village near Hanswar of this region.

=== Civic amenities and services ===
==== Hospitals ====
- Mahamaya Rajkiya Allopathic Medical College serve as local Hospital for Tanda and entire Ambedkar Nagar district.

== Economy ==
Tanda is an industrial city known for its Tanda Terricot clothes which are manufactured on power looms, and has an earlier history of weaving on hand looms. Things changed with the introduction of electricity in the early 1960s.

== Transportation ==
=== By train ===
Tanda is well connected by road to the rest of the country. The rail connections are used primarily for goods transportation for the power plant and the cement factory. For passenger transportation, Akbarpur Junction, Ayodhya Cantt and Ayodhya Junction is the main option. Akbarpur has located about 58 km from Ayodhya. Tanda is around 187 km from Lucknow.

=== By air ===
The nearest international airports are the Ayodhya Airport in Ayodhya, Lal Bahadur Shastri Airport in Varanasi and Chaudhary Charan Singh International Airport in Lucknow. Nearest domestic airport is Gorakhpur Airport in Gorakhpur.

=== Road ===
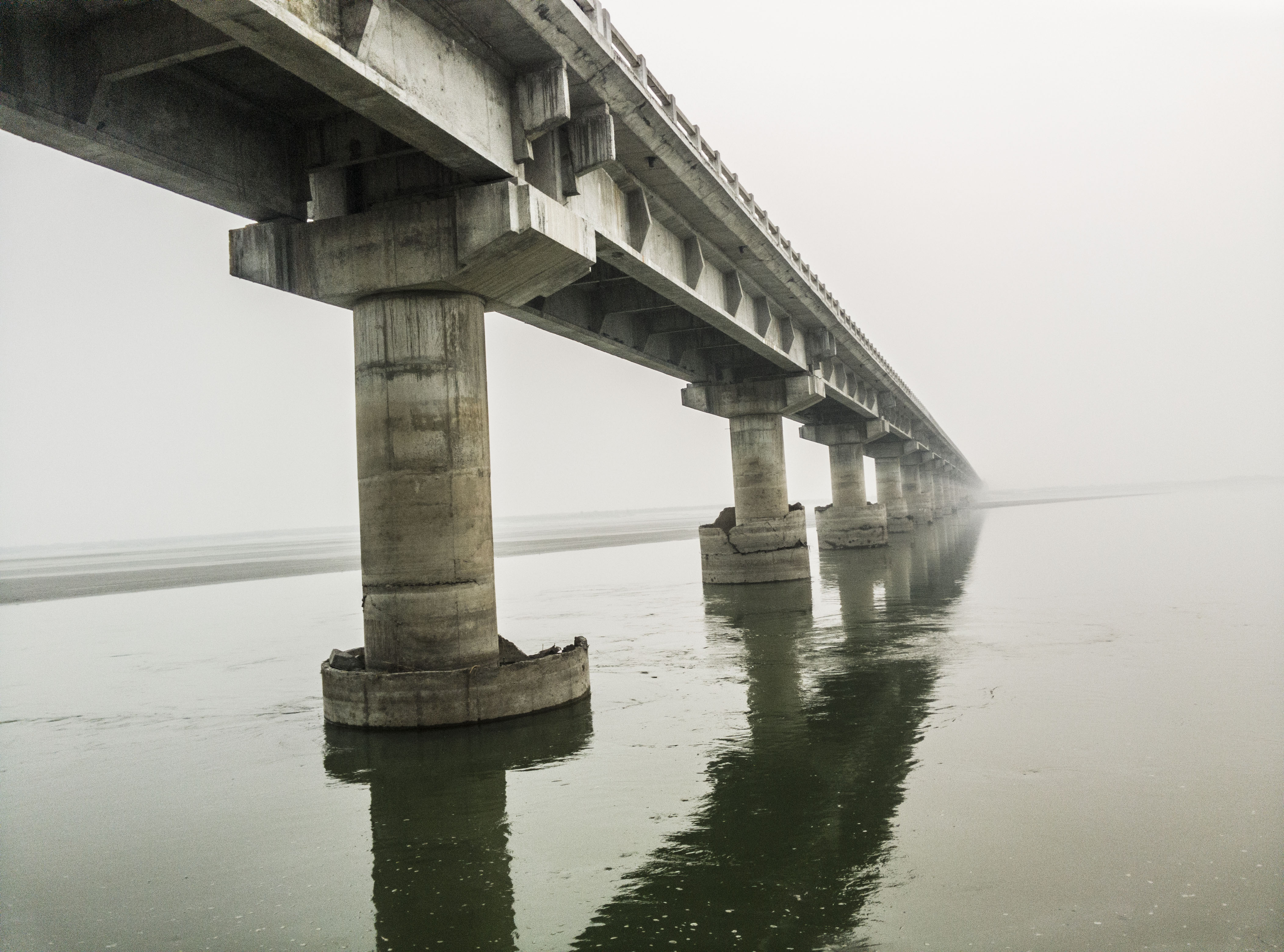
View of Tanda Kalwari Bridge from Ghaghara River.

The town is situated 20 kilometres (12 mi) north east from district headquarter Akbarpur. The town is directly connected with Basti by National Highway 28 passing through Tanda-Kalwari Bridge. The town is connected to Banda by National Highway 128 via Akbarpur, Sultanpur and Raebareli. Road connectivity:

- National Highway 233A (India)
- National Highway 232 (India)
- Tanda-Azamgarh Road
- Tanda-Rajesultanpur Road
- Tanda-Basti Road
- Tanda- Ayodhya Road

== Education ==
- Adarsh Janta Inter College, Tanda Ambedkar Nagar
- D.A.V. Academy, Tanda
- Qaumi Inter College Tanda Ambedkar Nagar
