= Ritesh Pandey =

Indian politician

Member of Parliament, Lok Sabha
- In office 23 May 2019 – 4 June 2024
- Preceded by: Hari Om Pandey
- Succeeded by: Lalji Verma
- Constituency: Ambedkar Nagar

Member (MLA) of Uttar Pradesh Legislative Assembly
- In office March 2017 – May 2019
- Preceded by: Sher Bahadur Singh
- Succeeded by: Subhash Rai
- Constituency: Jalalpur

Personal details
- Born: 3 April 1981 (age 45) Lucknow, Uttar Pradesh, India
- Party: Bharatiya Janata Party (2024-present)
- Other political affiliations: Bahujan Samaj Party (2019-2024)
- Parent: Rakesh Pandey
- Profession: Agriculture, business, social work
- Website: www.riteshpandey.in

Ritesh Pandey (born 3 April 1981) is an Indian politician who has served as the Member of Parliament from Ambedkar Nagar. He was a member of the Bahujan Samaj Party (BSP) from the state of Uttar Pradesh. Pandey resigned from Bahujan Samaj Party and joined Bharatiya Janata Party (BJP) in February 2024. He was also a MLA from Jalalpur constituency in Ambedkar Nagar district, which he represented between June 2017 and May 2019 before elected as MP in (Lok Sabha). He was appointed the Leader of the BSP in the Lok Sabha in January 2020. Prior to this appointment, he served as the Deputy Leader. According to his election filing he has 30 crores as his assets.

== Personal life ==
Pandey was born in Lucknow on 3 April 1981 to politician Rakesh Pandey and Manju Pandey. His father is a former Member of Parliament from Ambedkar Nagar. His older brother, Ashish Pandey is a real estate businessman. He graduated with a bachelor's degree in international business management from the European Business School in London in the year 2005.

== Politics ==
In the 2019 Lok Sabha election, Pandey won from the Ambedkar Nagar as a Bahujan Samaj Party (BSP) candidate by defeating closest rival from the Bharatiya Janata Party, Mukut Bihari, with a winning margin of 95,880 votes. In the assembly elections of 2017, he was elected as a MLA from the Jalalpur constituency, with a victory margin of 90303 votes. In 2012, Pandey unsuccessfully contested the Uttar Pradesh assembly elections, losing to Sher Bahadur Singh from the Samajwadi Party. Pandey has been ranked 19th in the Parliamentary Business Survey among 539 MPs in the country. He is the youngest MP to appear in the Top-20. Pandey has also got an excellent grade for the expenditure incurred on development works. He also serves as Chairman of the Parliamentary Committee on Papers Laid on the Table of the House. In 2020, he became the Floor Leader of the Bahujan Samaj Party in the Lok Sabha, becoming one of the youngest parliamentarians to lead a major national party in Parliament. Pandey is also an active member of multiple parliamentary committees such as the Standing Committee on External Affairs, the Joint Parliamentary Committee to examine the Personal Data Protection Bill, 2019 and the Joint Parliamentary Committee on the Biological Diversity (Amendment) Bill 2021.

Pandey resigned from BSP and joined the BJP on 26 February 2024, and contested in the 2024 Lok Sabha election but lost to Samajwadi Party's Lalji Verma.

== Social work ==
Pandey is the chairman of the Raghuraji Devi Foundation Trust who works on reforming education and promoting youth cultural events. He is also the co-founder and CEO of Awadh Mutineers, a grassroots sports initiative that trains and supports underprivileged children for playing football.
