= Sher Bahadur Singh =

Indian politician (1941-2020)

Member of Legislative Assembly, Uttar Pradesh
- In office 2007–2017
- Preceded by: Rakesh Pandey
- Succeeded by: Ritesh Pandey
- Constituency: Jalalpur
- In office 1996–2002
- Preceded by: Ram Lakhan Verma
- Succeeded by: Rakesh Pandey
- Constituency: Jalalpur
- In office 1980–1989
- Preceded by: Bhagauti Prasad
- Succeeded by: Ram Lakhan Verma
- Constituency: Jalalpur

Personal details
- Born: 9 September 1941 Kannupur, Jalalpur
- Died: 19 January 2020 (aged 78) Lucknow
- Party: Indian National Congress (1980-1985), Bhartiya Janata Party (1996-2002), Bahujan Samaj Party (2007-2012),

Sher Bahadur Singh (died 19 January 2020) was an Indian politician in Uttar Pradesh. He served 5 times as Member of the Legislative Assembly (India) Uttar Pradesh for Jalalpur (Assembly constituency). He was firstly elected member of Uttar Pradesh Legislative Assembly for Jalalpur constituency in 1980 from Indian National Congress, in 1985 as Independent, in 1996 from Bharatiya Janata Party, in 2002 from Bahujan Samaj Party, in 2012 from Samajwadi Party.

He was once a member of the Bahujan Samaj Party, but left that party after it decided not to field him as a candidate in the forthcoming election and joined the Samajwadi Party on 25 July 2011.

Singh died on 19 January 2020 of an age-related illness.

== Controversies ==
In 2007, tailoring shops were found in garages rented by several members of the Uttar Pradesh Legislative Assembly, including Singh.

In 2007, fighting broke out between Singh's bodyguards and some uninvited journalists at the wedding of Singh's nephew, Pawan Singh.
