= Shankhlal Majhi =

Indian politician from Uttar Pradesh

Shankhlal Majhi शंखलाल माझी
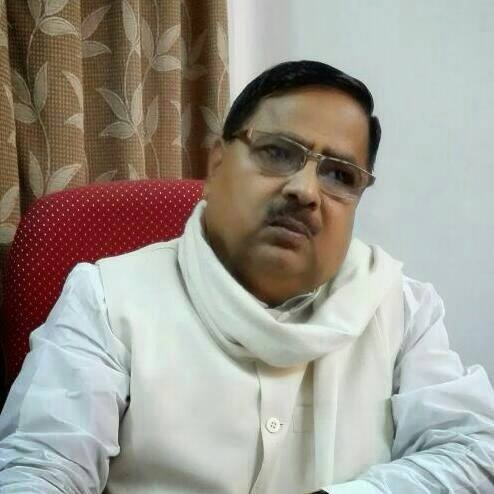

Minister of Medical-health and Family welfare Government of Uttar Pradesh
- In office March 2012 – March 2017
- Chief Minister: Akhilesh Yadav
- Succeeded by: Lalji Verma
- Constituency: Katehri

Personal details
- Born: 22 February 1955 (age 71) Village MukhlisPur, SantKabir Nagar, Uttar Pradesh
- Party: Samajwadi Party
- Spouse: Anjani (Wife)
- Children: Two (Sons) Ankur(Ravi)& Aakash, Three (Daughter) Mamta, Neha (Mansi), Ankita
- Profession: Agriculturist & Politician

Shankhlal Majhi is an Indian politician and former member of parliament from Akbarpur (now Ambedkar Nagar) and two time former member of Uttar Pradesh Legislative Assembly. Majhi is a member of the Samajwadi Party and represents Katehari constituency of Uttar Pradesh. He is the state Minister of Medical - Health and family welfare of Uttar Pradesh, in office since 15 March 2012.

== Early life and education ==
Shankhlal Majhi was born in the village Mukhlispur, SantKabeer Nagar district, in the state of Uttar Pradesh in 1955. Majhi had represented Akbarpur.

Majhi was elected to the Uttar Pradesh Legislative Assembly twice, in 2002 from Hainsarbazar (now Dhanghata) and in 2012 from the Katehari seat. He worked as a state minister of fisheries (independent), and is currently working as a state minister of Medical-health and family welfare. He is a prominent Nishada face of Samajwadi Party among India's fishing community. Majhi was elected as member of Parliament in 2004.
