= Panna Lal =

Indian politician (born 1921)

Member of Parliament, Lok Sabha
- In office 17 April 1952 – 4 April 1957
- Prime Minister: Jawaharlal Nehru
- Preceded by: Constituency established
- Constituency: Faizabad District (North West)
- In office 5 April 1957 – 3 March 1967
- Prime Minister: Jawaharlal Nehru; Gulzarilal Nanda; Lal Bahadur Shastri; Indira Gandhi
- Preceded by: Constituency established
- Succeeded by: Ramji Ram
- Constituency: Akbarpur

Personal details
- Born: 20 January 1921 Barhai-Ka-Purva, Faizabad, United Provinces, British India (present-day Uttar Pradesh, India)
- Party: Indian National Congress
- Spouse: Putravati Devi

Panna Lal (born 20 January 1921) was an Indian politician. He was elected to the Lok Sabha, the lower house of the Parliament of India, as a member of the Indian National Congress.
