= Sanju Devi =

Indian politician

Member of the Legislative Assembly, Uttar Pradesh
- In office 11 March 2017 – 10 March 2022
- Preceded by: Azimulhaq Pahalwan
- Constituency: Tanda

Personal details
- Born: Aliganj Tanda, Ambedkar Nagar
- Party: Bharatiya Janata Party
- Education: Junior High School Vidhyalaya
- Occupation: MLA
- Profession: Politician

Sanju Devi is an Indian politician who served as a member of 17th Legislative Assembly of Uttar Pradesh of India. She represented the Tanda constituency of Ambedkar Nagar from Uttar Pradesh and is a member of Bharatiya Janata Party.

== Political career ==
Sanju Devi has been a member of the 17th Legislative Assembly of Uttar Pradesh. Since 2017 she represents the Tanda constituency and is a member of the Bharatiya Janata Party.

== Posts held ==
#	From	To	Position	Comments
01	2017	2022	Member, 17th Legislative Assembly	

== See also ==
- Uttar Pradesh Legislative Assembly
