= Bhulepur =

- Village
- Location in Uttar Pradesh, India Bhulepur (India)
- Coordinates: 26°31′36″N 82°48′38″E
- Country: India
- State: Uttar Pradesh
- District: Ambedaker Nagar

Population (2001)
  - Total: 5,413

Languages
  - Official: Hindi
- Time zone: UTC+5:30 (IST)

Bhulepur (Hindi: भुलेपुर Bhulēpur, Urdu: بھولے پور) is a census town in Ambedaker Nagar district in the state of Uttar Pradesh, India.

== Demographics ==
As of 2001 India census, Bhulepur had a population of 5,413. Males constitute 52% of the population and females 48%. Bhulepur has an average literacy rate of 51%, lower than the national average of 59.5%; with male literacy of 56% and female literacy of 46%. 19% of the population is under 6 years of age.
