= Hanswar =

- Village
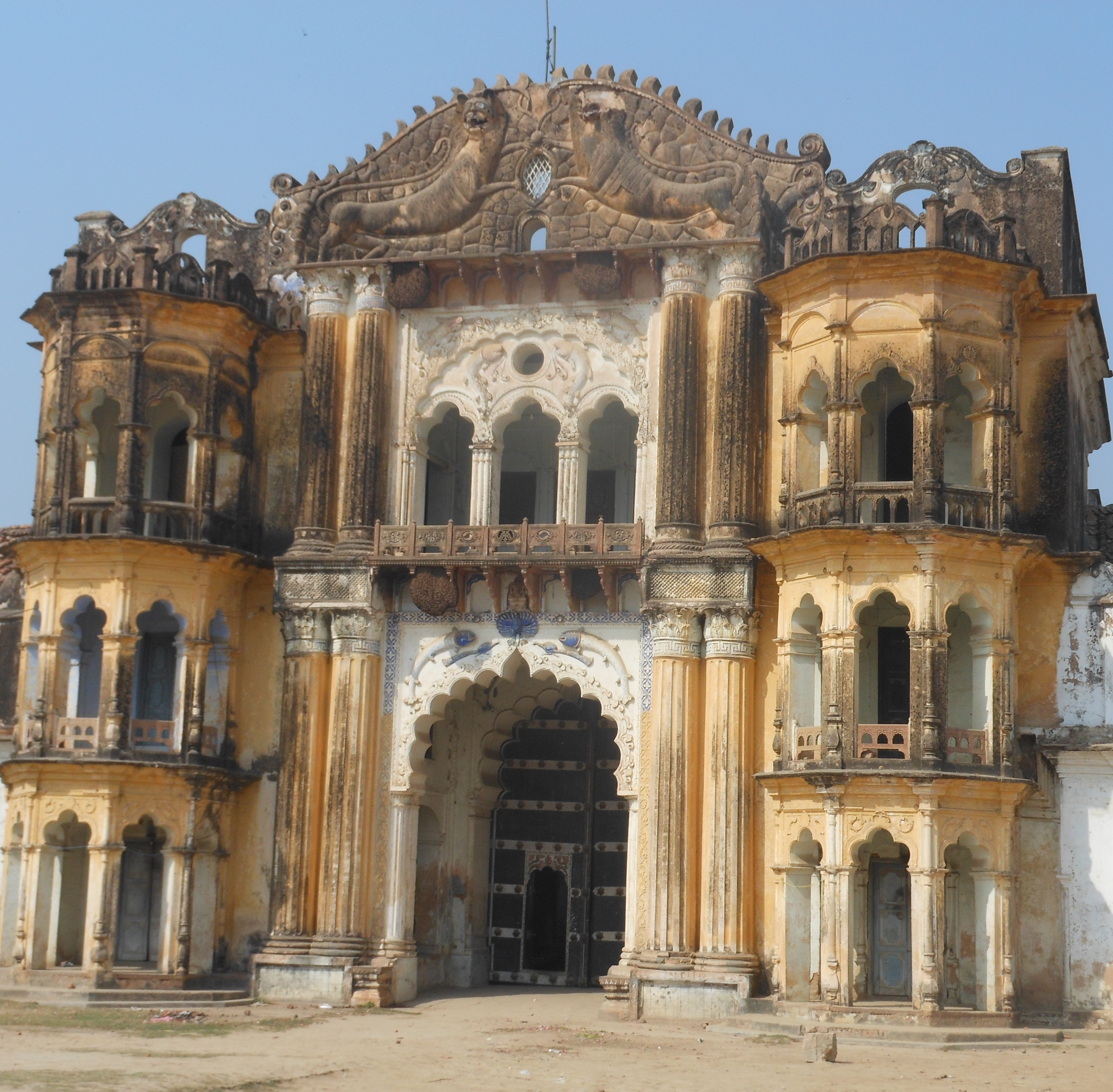

- Location in Uttar Pradesh, India
- Coordinates: 26.533°N 82.730°E
- Country: India
- State: Uttar Pradesh
- District: Ambedaker Nagar
- Elevation: 78 m (256 ft)

Language
  - Official: Hindi
  - Additional official: Urdu
- Time zone: UTC+5:30 (IST)
- PIN: 224143
- Telephone code: 0527328
- Vehicle registration: UP 45

Hanswar is a village in the Ambedkar Nagar district of Uttar Pradesh, India, located east of Tanda. Demographically, Hanswar resembles the rest of the Purvanchal area in which it is located.

== History ==
Hanswar, located 70-80 miles from Ayodhya, had a history dating back to the Mughal period. The ruler of the estate, Ranvijay Singh and his wife Jaikumari, vehemently opposed the construction of the Babri Masjid by Mir Baqi on Ram Janmabhoomi along with other Hindu rulers of the time. The Janmabhoomi Parisar was in control of Ranvijay Singh for 15 days well after it became part of the Babri Masjid, after which he died in a battle with the Mughal Army.

== Geography ==
=== Climate ===
Climate data for Hanswar
Month	Jan	Feb	Mar	Apr	May	Jun	Jul	Aug	Sep	Oct	Nov	Dec	Year
Record high °C (°F)	28 (82)	32 (90)	41 (106)	44 (111)	46 (115)	48 (118)	41 (106)	38 (100)	38 (100)	37 (99)	33 (91)	28 (82)	48 (118)
Mean daily maximum °C (°F)	18 (64)	26 (79)	32 (90)	36 (97)	40 (104)	42 (108)	36 (97)	34 (93)	35 (95)	32 (90)	26 (79)	20 (68)	33 (91)
Mean daily minimum °C (°F)	6 (43)	12 (54)	16 (61)	22 (72)	27 (81)	29 (84)	27 (81)	26 (79)	25 (77)	20 (68)	12 (54)	7 (45)	15 (59)
Record low °C (°F)	−3 (27)	7 (45)	11 (52)	15 (59)	20 (68)	22 (72)	20 (68)	18 (64)	21 (70)	15 (59)	9 (48)	0.5 (32.9)	−3 (27)
Average precipitation mm (inches)	23 (0.9)	16 (0.6)	9 (0.4)	5 (0.2)	6 (0.2)	68 (2.7)	208 (8.2)	286 (11.3)	202 (8.0)	43 (1.7)	7 (0.3)	8 (0.3)	881 (34.7)

Summer (March to July) temperatures can range from 35 to 45 degrees Celsius. Winters (November to January) temperatures can range from 6 to 25 degrees Celsius. Rains occur during monsoon season (July to September).

== Transport ==
Hanswar has bus routes connecting to the nearby cities of New Delhi, Mumbai, Agra, Ludhiana, Ambala, Lucknow, Varanasi, Jaunpur, Allahabad, Azamgarh, Gorakhpur, Faizabad, Akbarpur, Rajesultanpur and Ghazipur. But has no service of Uttar Pradesh Road Transport Corporation

== Education ==
Primary Hira Kids

Hira world_map by Mr. Akbar Ali

- Hira Public School
- Rangey Raghav Inter College
- Mohd Shafi National Inter College
- Shiv Kumari Devi Girls Inter College Hanswar

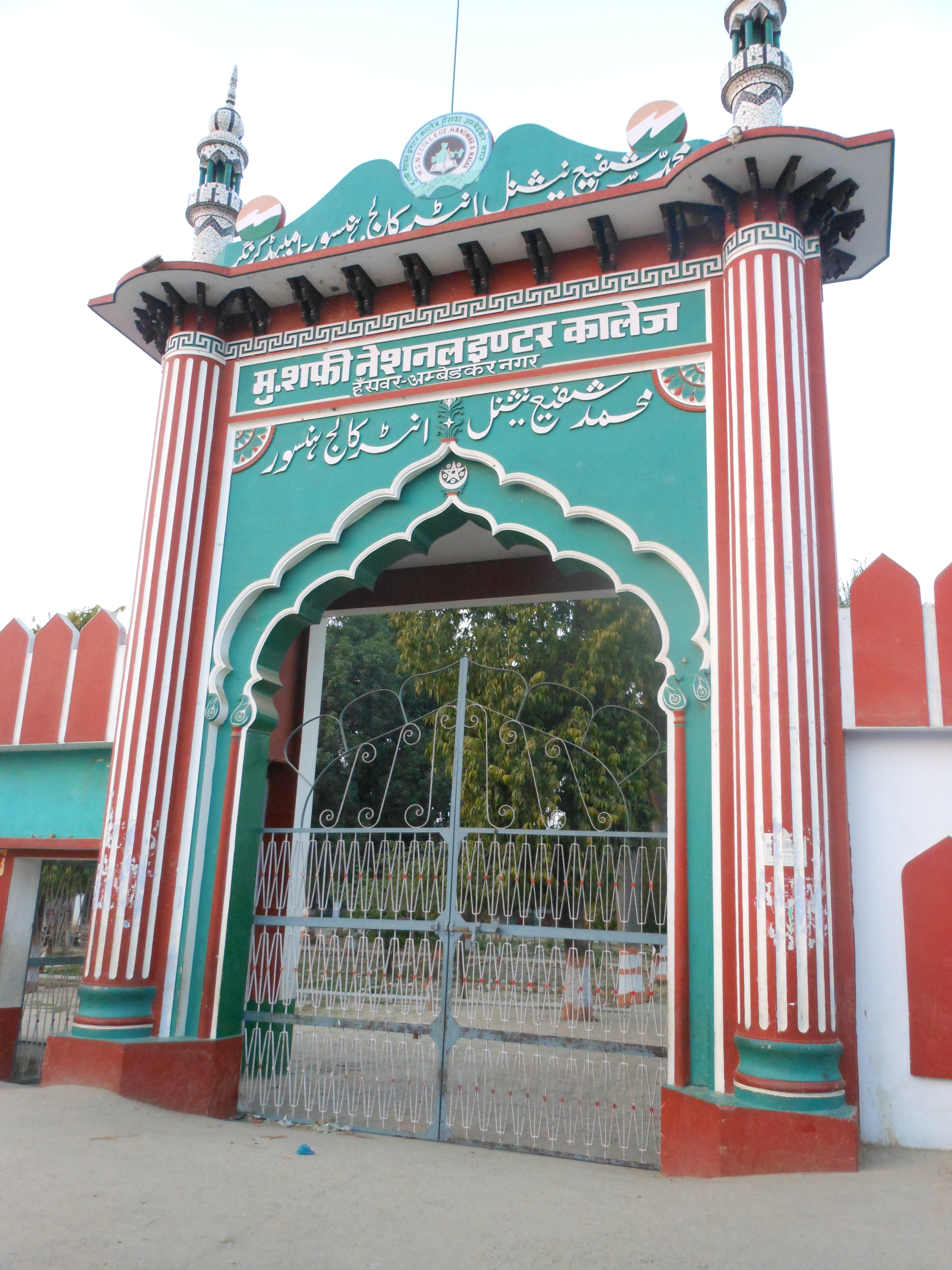
Mohd Safee National Inter College

== Notable people ==
- Masood Ahmad, Ex. MLA
- Bashir Badr, poet who writes in Urdu language, especially ghazals.

== Gallery ==
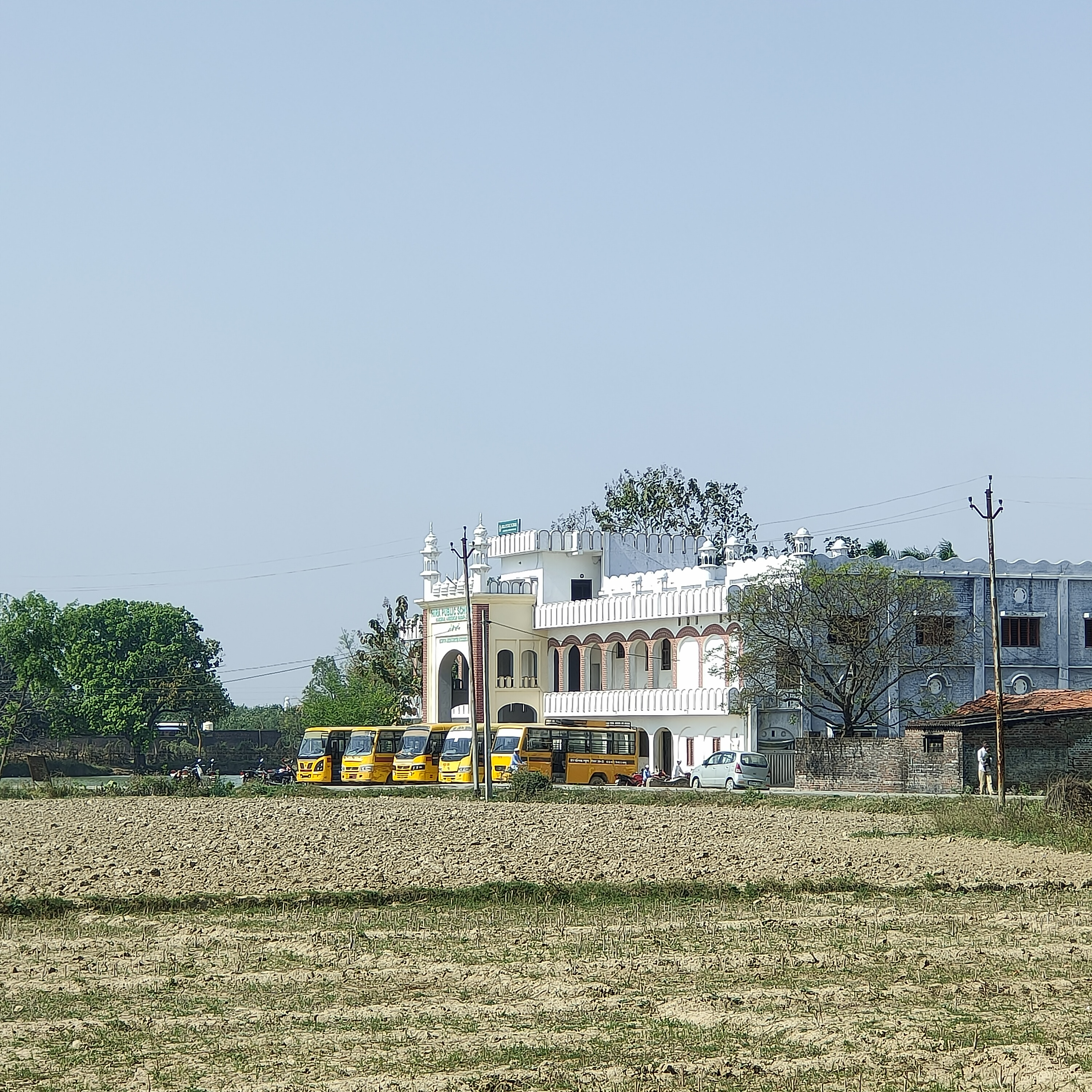
Hira Public School 10+2 1st CBSE Board Hanswar Ambedkar Nagar

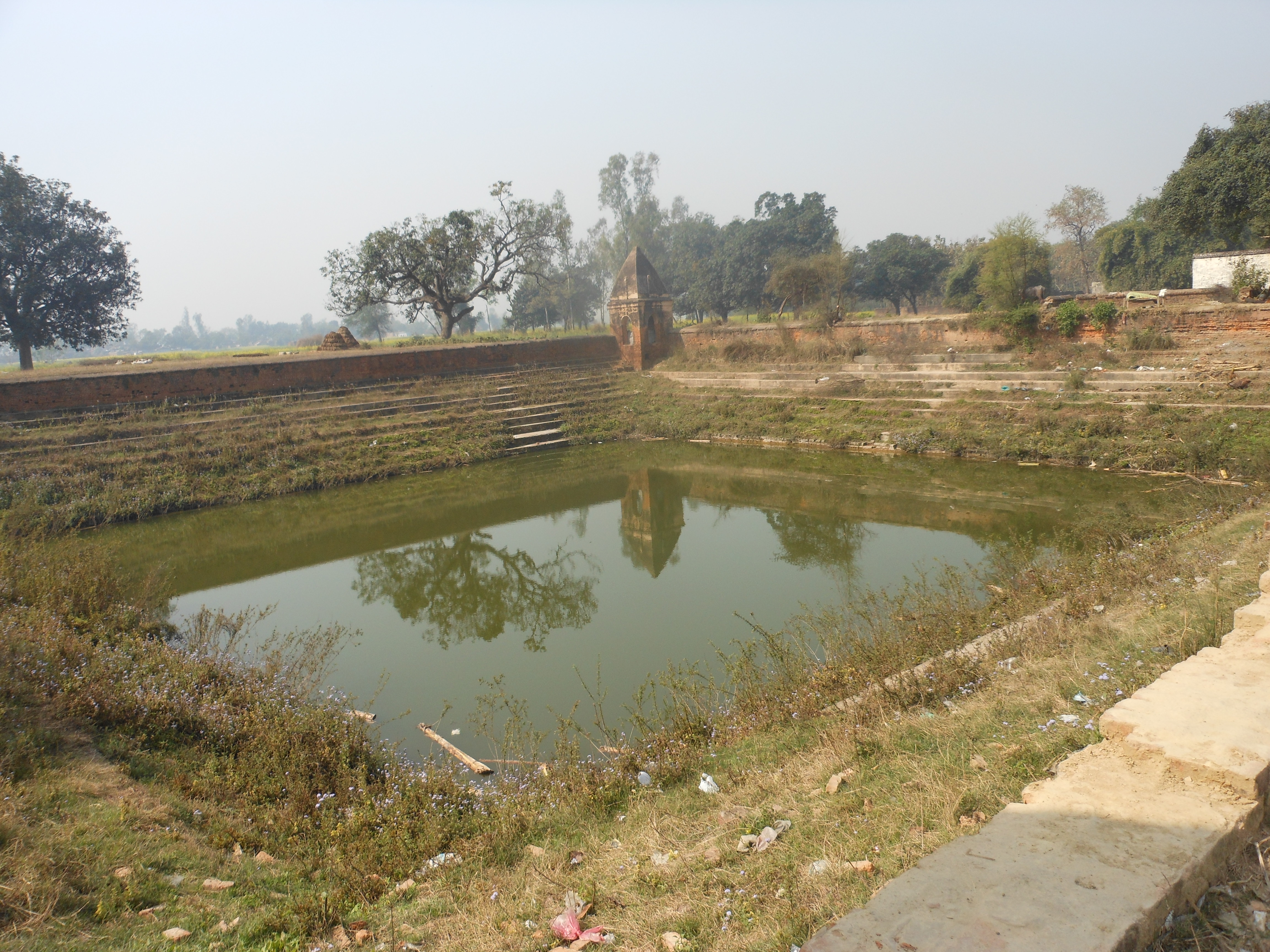
Khaki Baba ka Pokhra, located east of Hanswar near Katokhar Chauraha

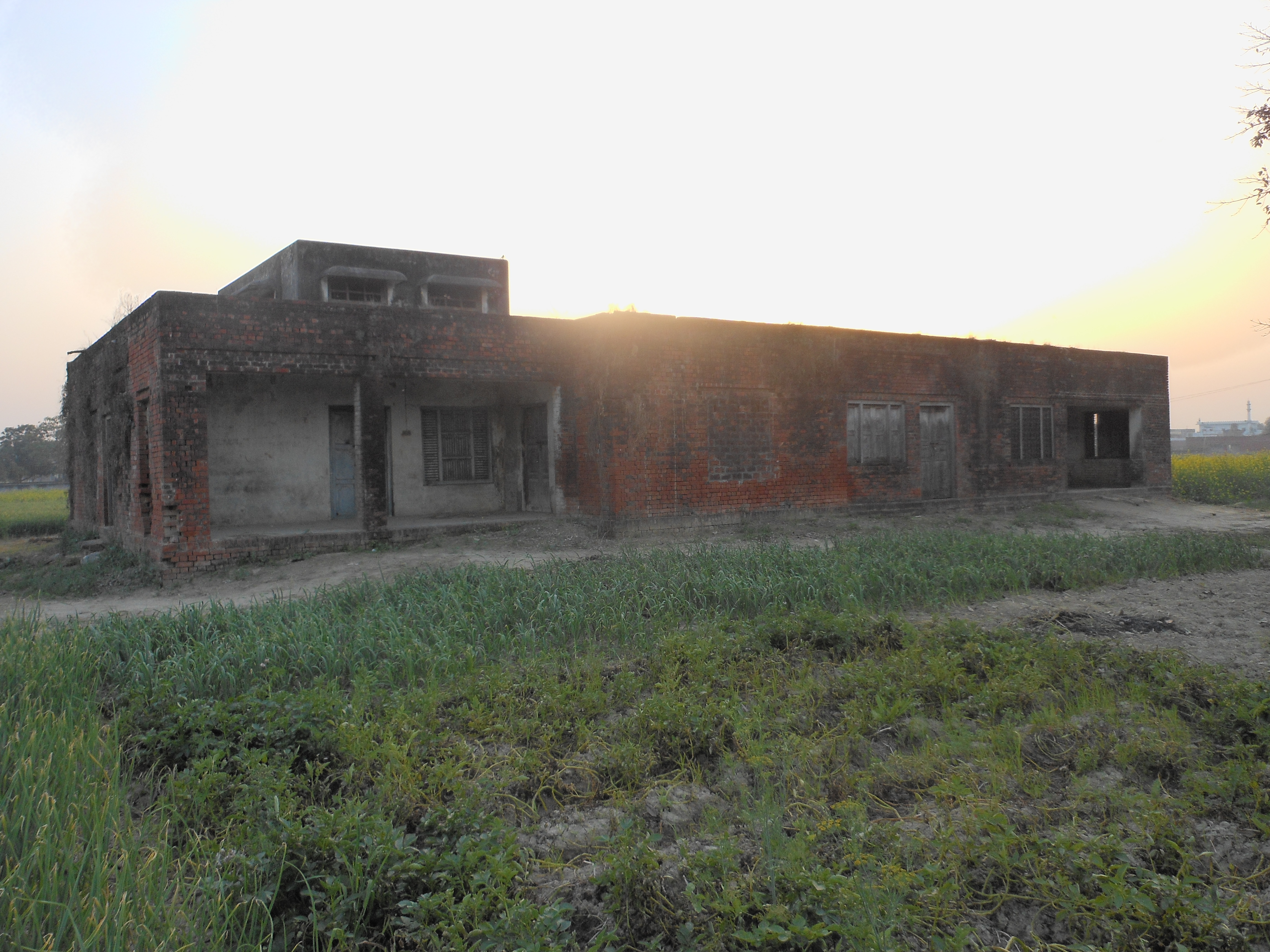
Hanswar's first hospital

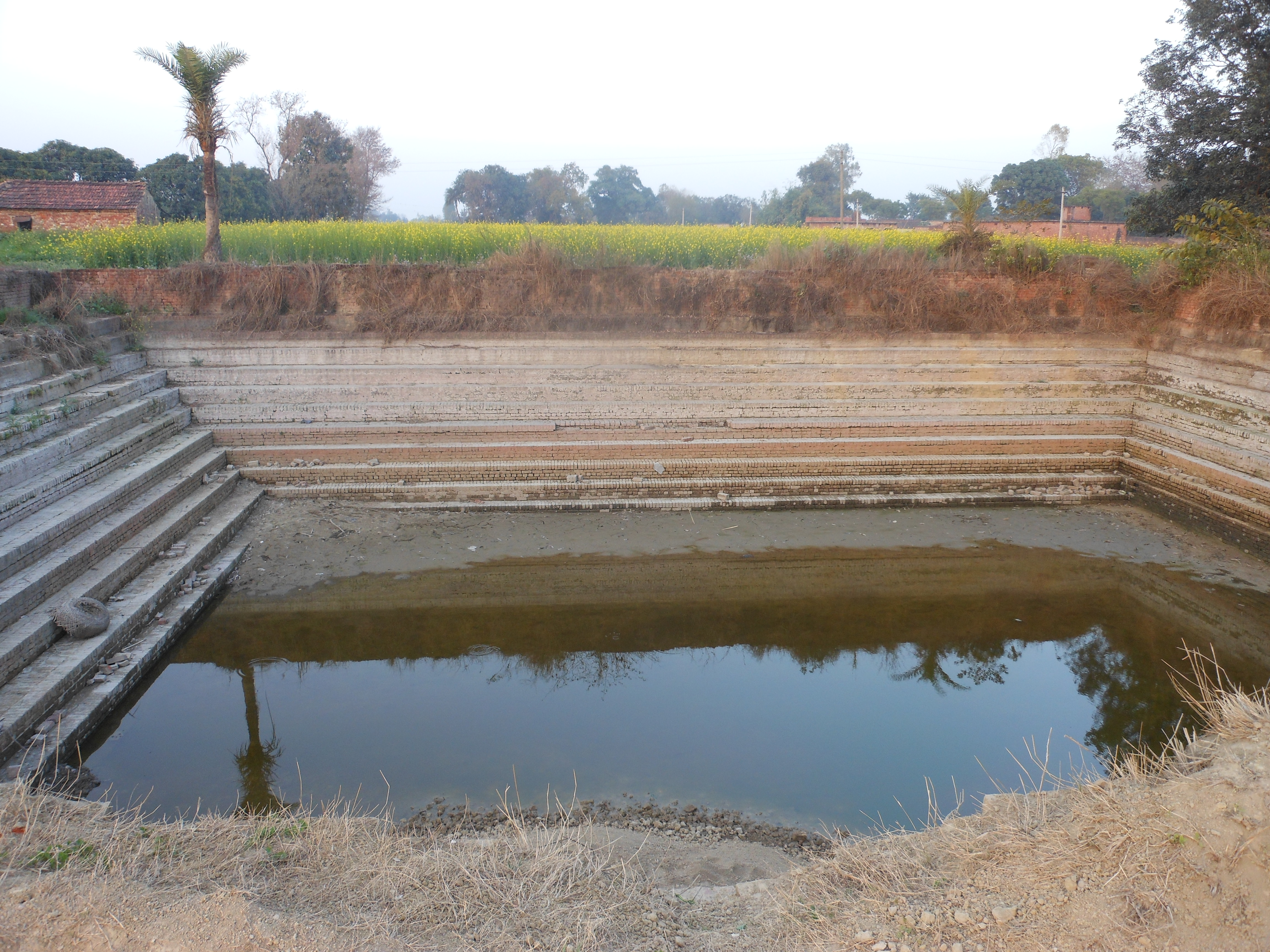
Hanswar swimming pool

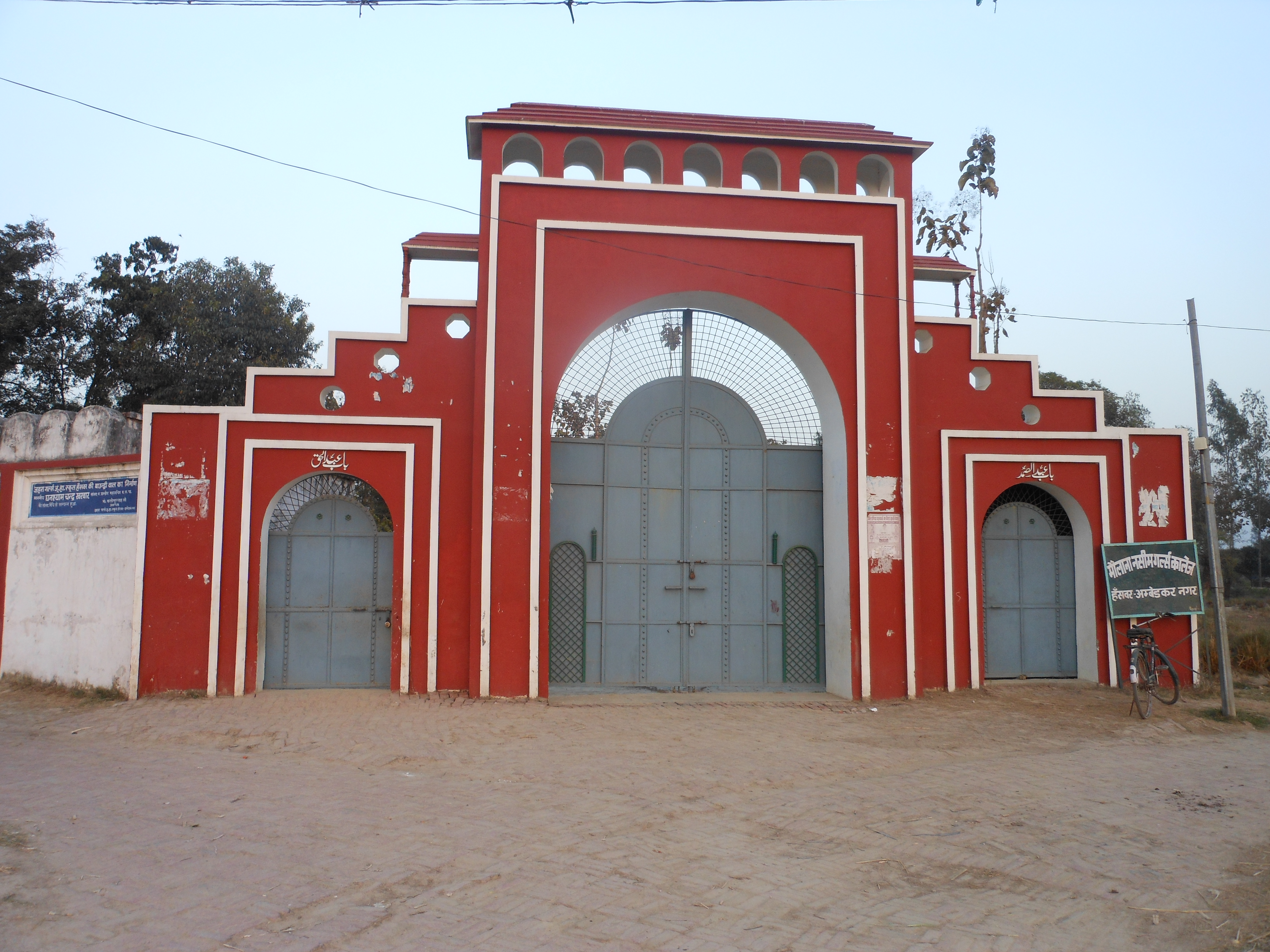
Maulana Naseem Girls College

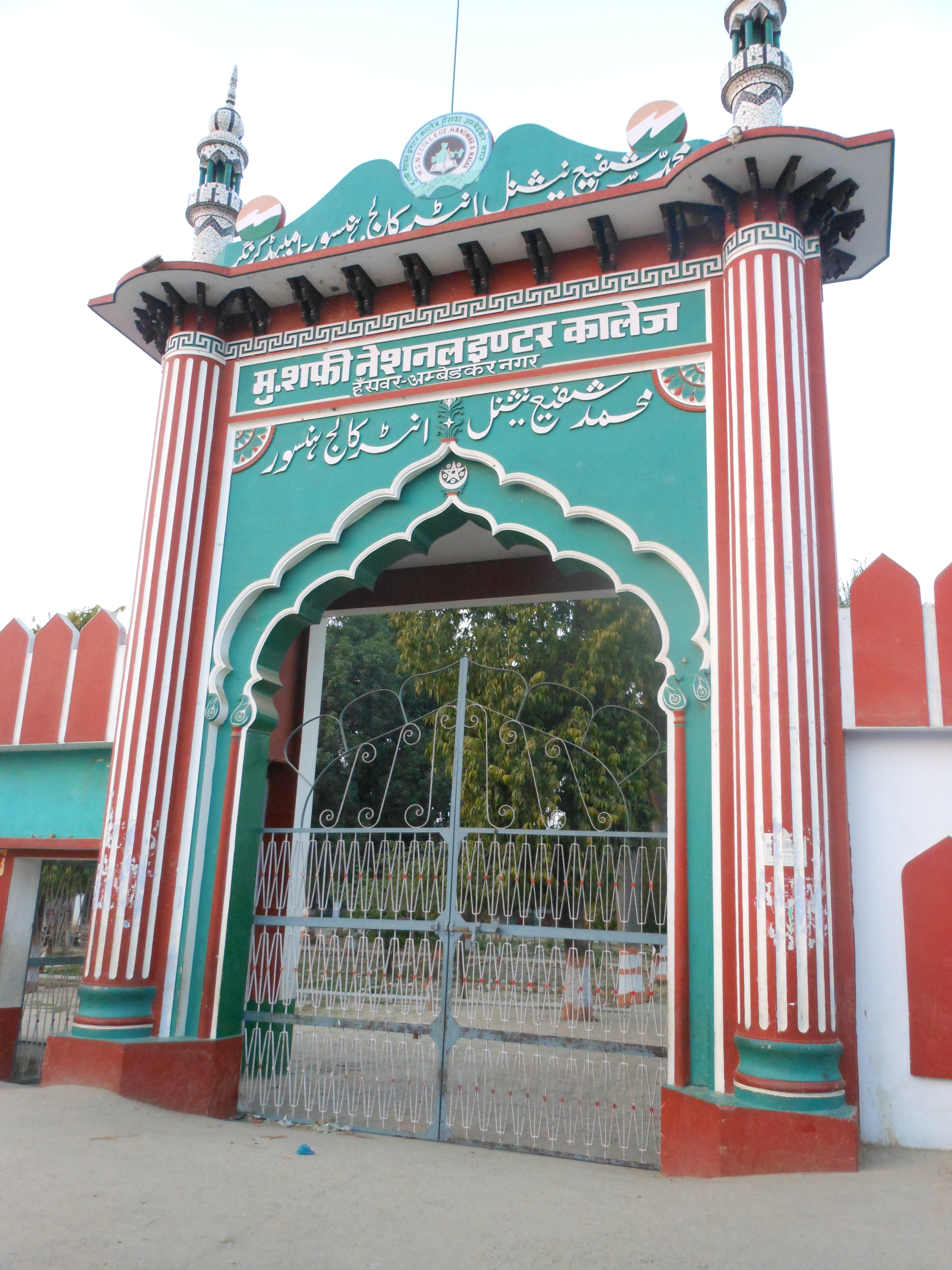
Mohd Safee National Inter College

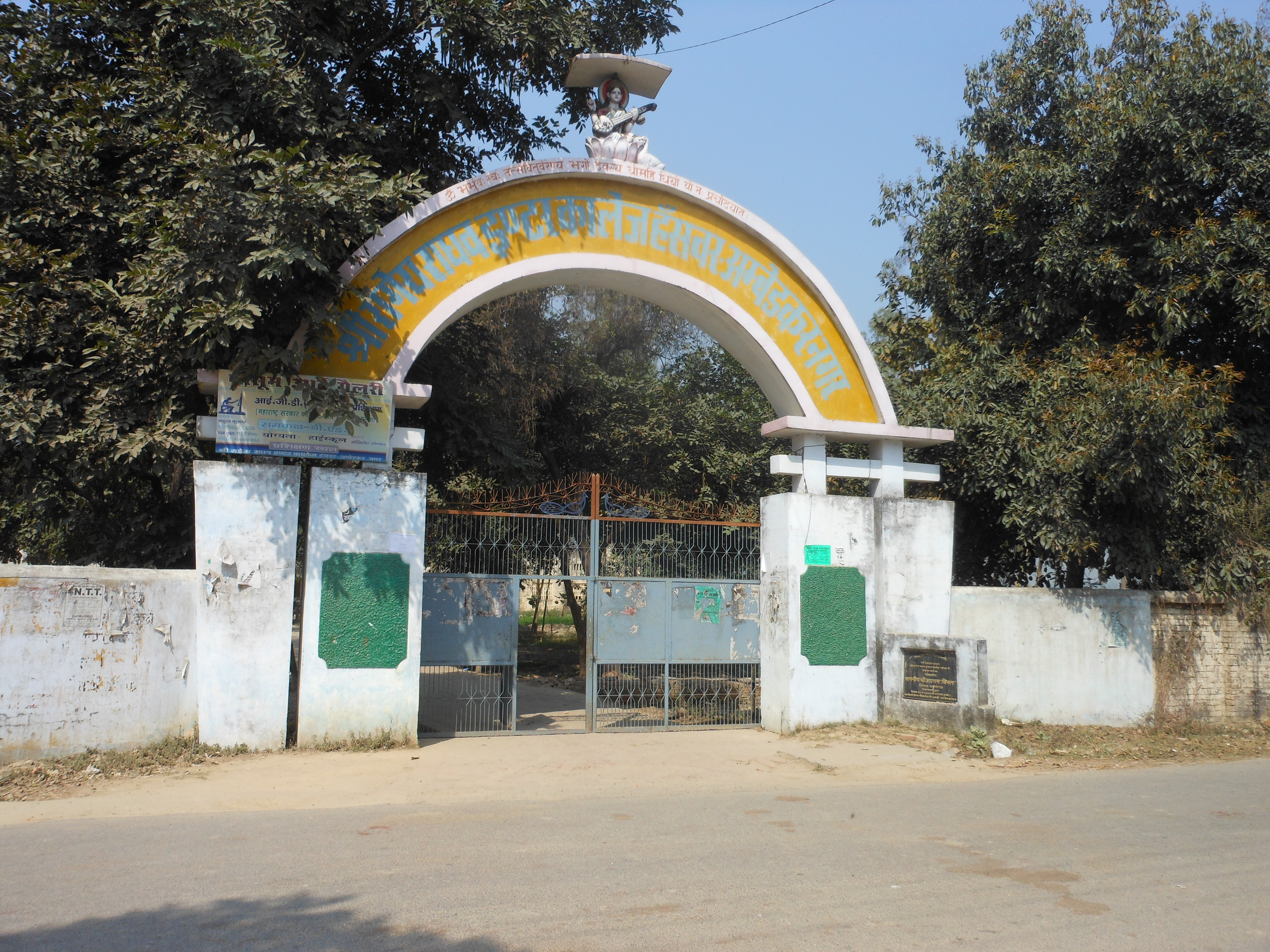
Rangey Raghav Inter College

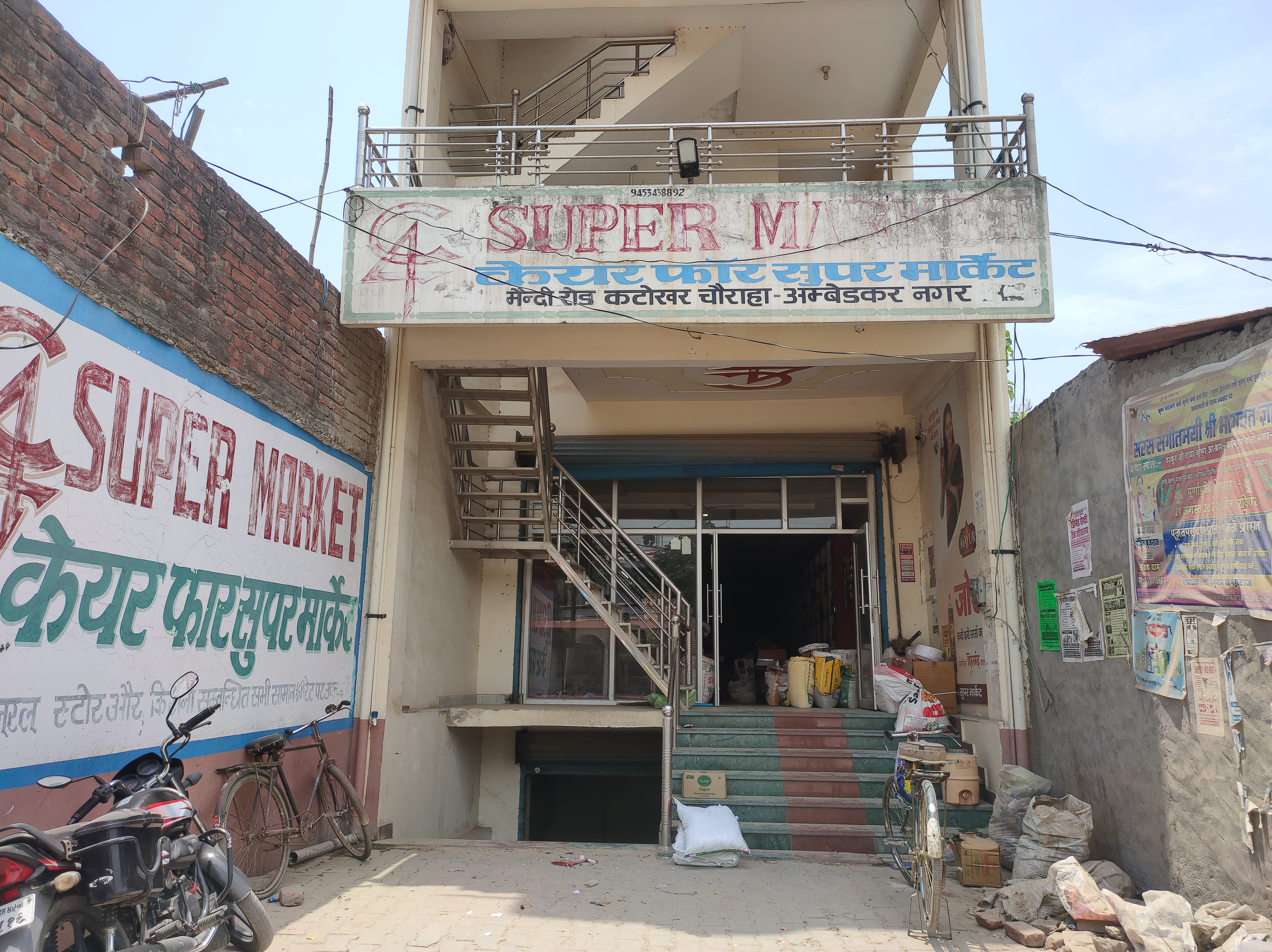
Care For Super Market Grocery Store

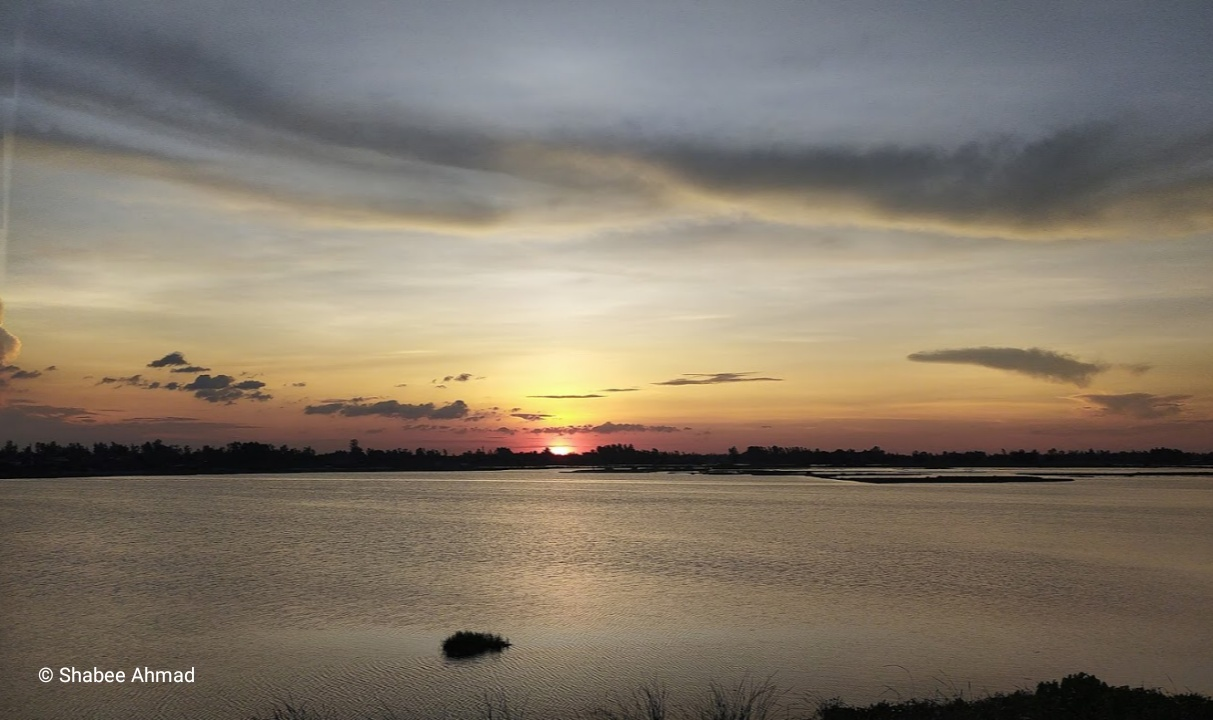
Hanswar lake by Shabee Ahmad
