= Dharmraj Nishad =

Indian politician

Member of Uttar Pradesh Legislative Assembly
- Incumbent
- Assumed office 23 November 2024
- Preceded by: Lalji Verma
- Constituency: Katehari
- In office 17 October 1996 – 8 March 2012
- Preceded by: Ram Dev Verma
- Succeeded by: Shankhlal Majhi
- Constituency: Katehari

Cabinet Minister Government of Uttar Pradesh
- In office 11 June 2008 – 15 March 2012
- Chief Minister: Mayawati
- Ministry & Department's: Fisheries

Personal details
- Party: Bharatiya Janata Party (2019 – present)
- Other political affiliations: Bahujan Samaj Party (1984-2019)
- Profession: Politician

Dharmraj Nishad is an Indian politician from Uttar Pradesh. He is a member of the Uttar Pradesh Legislative Assembly since 2024, representing Katehari Assembly constituency as a member of the Bharatiya Janata Party.

== See also ==
- Uttar Pradesh Legislative Assembly
- Katehari assembly
