= Markazul Maarif =

Social welfare organization in India

Markazul Ma’arif
- Type: NGO
- Registration no.: Regd. No. 187/83-84 (XXI of SR Act – 1860)
- Headquarters: Hojai
- Fields: Education, Relief & Rehabilitation, Agriculture, Social Forestry, Skill Development and more
- Board of directors: Dr. S.H. Choudhury
- Key people: Badruddin Ajmal, Sirajuddin Ajmal
- Award(s): Dakshata Gold Award Vijay; Rattan Gold Medal Award; Intellectual People Award
- Website: markazulmaarif.org

Markazul Ma'arif (Hindi: मरकज़-उल-मआरिफ़), is a Voluntary Social-welfare Non-Government Organisation in India. The organisation strives to work for the upliftment of economically and educationally backward segment of society. Since its inception Markazul Ma’arif has been uninterruptedly materializing various schemes and plans in different fields. Markaz has already carved a niche for itself in the heart of people with its wide network of activities throughout the country. Markazul Ma’arif plays an active role in relief and rehabilitation operation for victims of natural calamities. It caters to the need of the people irrespective of their caste, creed and religion by providing them with food, clothing and medicine. The organization is registered under Society Registration Act XXI of 1860, Reg. No. 187/83-84 (XXI of the SR Act of 1860).

== Activities ==
Markazul Ma'arif is running several school and scholarship endowment in Hojai and Nagaon District. Some of them are

- English Medium Schools - More than 40 Nos.
- Industrial Training Centre - 01 Nos
- Krishi Vikas Kendra under Agriculture Department - 01 Nos
- Merit Scholarships
- Medical and Marriage Aid
- Emergency Relief and Rehabilitation
- Computer and Vocational Training Centres - 19 Nos.
- Health Care and Sanitation Schemes
- Drinking Water supply schemes
- Social Forestry and Environment Promotion schemes
- Monthly aid to Poor, Widows and Differently able persons.
