= Sufism in Bangladesh =

Sufi tradition in Bangladesh

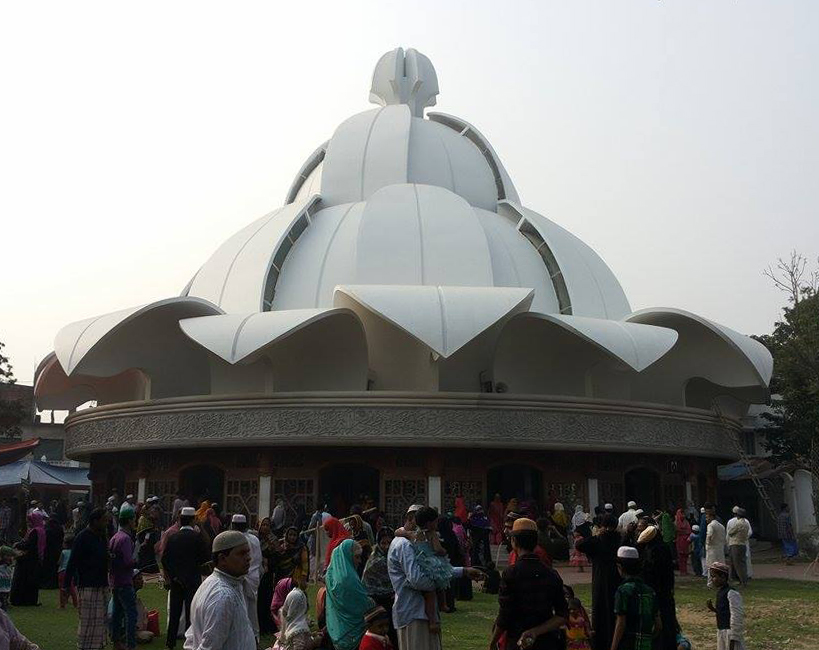
Shrine of Sayed Ziaul Haq, a Bengali Sufi saint

Sufism in Bangladesh is more or less similar to that in the whole Indian subcontinent. India, it is claimed, is one of the five great centers of Sufism, the other four being Persia (including central Asia), Baghdad (in Iraq), Syria, and North Africa. Sufi saints flourished in South Asia preaching the mystic teachings of Sufism that reached the common people. Sufism in Bangladesh is also called pirism, after the pirs or teachers in the Sufi tradition (also called Fakir).

The Sufism tremendously influenced local population and thus these Sufi masters were the single most important factor in South Asian conversions to Islam, particularly in what is now Bangladesh. Most Bangladeshi Muslims are influenced to some degree by Sufism. The conversion to Islam of the population of what was to become Bangladesh began in the thirteenth century and continued for hundreds of years. Muslim pirs who wandered about in villages and towns were responsible for many conversions.

A majority of Bangladeshi Muslims perceive Sufis as a source of spiritual wisdom and guidance and their Khanqahs and Dargahs as nerve centers of Muslim society These majority of Muslims in Bangladesh are Sunni, who mainly follow the Hanafi school of thought (madh'hab).

== Sufi principles ==
The Sufi principles and practices of Bangladesh are completely traced to the Quran and the Hadith. The mystical expressions of the Quranic verses of the Prophet Muhammad are the direct sources of Sufism. The concepts of nafs (self), zikr (remembrance), ibadat (prayer), muraqabah (meditation), miraj (ascension), tajalli (divine illumination), faqr (spiritual poverty), tawhid (Unity of God), fana (annihilation) and baqaa (subsistence) are all the basic sources of Sufism, as practiced in Bangladesh.

The tradition of Islamic mysticism known as Sufism appeared very early in Islam and became essentially a popular movement emphasizing worship out of a love of Allah, rather than fear. Sufism stresses a direct, unstructured, personal devotion to Allah in place of the ritualistic, outward observance of the faith and "a Sufi aims to attain spiritual union with God through love". An important belief in the Sufi tradition is that the average believer may use spiritual guides in his pursuit of the truth. Throughout the centuries many gifted scholars and numerous poets have been inspired by Sufi ideas.

== History ==
=== Under Brahmanic and Buddhist rule ===
Migrant Sufis introduced Islam to Bengal in the 12th century, during the Buddhist Pala Empire. Hinduism was also widespread in Bengal at the time, with some local rulers being explicitly Brahmanic despite being ruled by Buddhists. Bengal was also likely home to indigenous folk religions not bound by Buddhist, Brahmanic or Islamic orthodoxy; the 14th century account of Ibn Battuta describes the subjects of Fakhruddin Mubarak Shah in Sylhet as "noted for their devotion to and practice of magic and witchcraft".

The 12th century Turkic-speaking migrants from Central Asia were often either led by an alp (also written alp-eren; a heroic warrior) or a Sufi teacher. Historian Richard M. Eaton describes these Sufi teachers as combining qualities of the alp and the pre-Islamic shaman, with the traditional Sufi hierarchy of master and disciple proving "remarkably well suited for binding retainers to charismatic leaders". The earliest known Muslim inscription in Bengal records the construction of a khanqah by a fakir whose father was born in Maragheh, Iran. It is dated to 29 July 1221 and was found in Birbhum district (in what is now West Bengal).

Persian Sufi histories depict early Sufis as ghazis, or wagers of war against non-Muslims. Hagiographies of 14th century Sufi sheikh Jalaluddin Tabrizi, one of the earliest attested Sufis in Bengal, describe him as destroying temples and replacing them with Sufi resting houses, and converting "infidels" to Islam. Similarly, the 15th century Shah Jalal is described as fighting and defeating "infidels". In the 1930s, orientalist Paul Wittek adopted this theme in his Gaza thesis explaining the spread of Islam and the Ottoman Empire. More recent historians, including Richard Eaton, have argued that these hagiographies are "obviously ideological", and that original Sufis were not primarily motivated by conversion or holy war, with no Bengal Sufi or sultan calling himself "ghazi".

Similarities between Sufi thought and practice and Hinduism encouraged an inter-mingling of ideas. The ancient text Amṛtakuṇḍa ("The Pool of Nectar") was translated into Arabic and Persian in the 13th century and widely circulated among Sufis in Bengal and India more widely, including with preambles that situated the work in an Islamic context. The 16th century Sufi Abdul Quddus Gangohi made use of the Amṛtakuṇḍa in his teaching.

=== Bengal sultanate rule ===
Sufis took up residence in the successive capitals of Bengal, Lakhnauti, Pandua and Gaur. Typically adherents of the Suhrawardi, Firdausi or Chishti orders, these "urban Sufis" often formed a mutual patronage with temporal leaders. Drawing on an existing concept in the Persian-speaking world, urban Sufis would "predict" which prince would govern, and for how long. Richard Eaton describes this as "the implicit act of appointment" behind the "explicit act of 'prediction'". In legend, the first three rulers of the Tughlaq dynasty received turbans from the grandson of Chisti saint Fariduddin Ganjshakar, with the length of each man's turban "exactly correspond[ing]" to the length of his reign.

In the 14th century, the Chisti order dominated Sufi involvement in South Asian politics because its major shrines were located in the sub-continent, whereas the other orders looked westward. Nizamuddin Auliya's khanqah in Badayun trained sheikhs who spread throughout South Asia, including his Bengal disciple Akhi Siraj Aainae Hind. Akhi Siraj Aainae Hind's successor, Alaul Haq Pandavi, formed an alliance with Ilyas Shah as he founded the Ilyas Shahi dynasty. Chisti influence was strong during the rule of the seven sultans of the first Ilyas Shahi dynasty, although not without clashes. The second sultan, Sikandar Shah, clashed with Alaul Haq Pandavi over the amount of money he was distributing to the poor, and he may have been wary of the Sufi gaining too much power with the public. He would eventually "banish" the Sufi to Sonargaon. Sufis had influence in every region of Bengal verses composed by Sufi Ashraf Jahangir Simnani notes:

In the country of Bengal, not to speak of the cities, there is no town and no village where holy saints did not come and settle down.

— Ashraf Jahangir Simnani (ca. 1414)

When the Ilyas Shahi dynasty fell for the first time, Sufis saw Bengal as a distinctly Islamic polity defined by three centuries of Muslim rule, and a crucial part of Islam's global presence, with Sheikh Nur Qutb Alam (son of Alaul Haq Pandavi) writing:

The lamp of the Islamic religion and of true guidance

Which had [formerly] brightened every corner with its light,

Has been extinguished by the wind of unbelief blown by Raja Ganesh.

...

When the abode of faith and Islam has fallen into such a fate,

Why are you sitting happily on your throne?

The Jaunpur sultan Ibrahim Shah was the intended target of the sheikh's letter, but it was internal dynamics that would restore Muslim rule to Bengal. The Hindu conqueror Raja Ganesha's son and successor Jalaluddin Muhammad Shah converted to Islam under Sufi influence. Jalaluddin Muhammad Shah and his son and successor Shamsuddin Ahmad Shah were disciples of Nur Qutb Alam, and the 12 sultans after them were disciples of other descendants of Alaul Haq Pandavi. Ironically given Nur Qutb Alam's letter asking him to restore Muslim rule to Bengal, Ibrahim Shah attempted to invade Bengal during the Muslim rule of Shamsuddin Ahmad Shah.

=== Colonial Bengal and independent Bangladesh ===
Reverence for the Bangla folk hero Satya Pir was identified over a hundred years ago in what is now Bangladesh. Ritual practices surrounding the figure represent a syncretic combination of Hindu and Sufi Muslim practices.

In the 19th century, the Sufi teacher Gausul Azam Maizbhandari introduced the Qadiriyya order to Bangladesh, with his particular teachings coalescing into Tarika-e-Maizbhandari.

In the 20th century, one of the most influential Sufi in Bangladesh was the Sufi saint Khwaja Yunus Ali, who developed a tripartite teaching method, "by writing", "by lecture" and "by khanqah". His followers numbered in the hundreds of thousands. A number of khanqahs are operated by his successors, including Bangladesh's largest Khankas.

Khwaja's student Maulana Hashmatullah Faridpuri, the pir of Atroshi (in Faridpur), was a Sufi teacher until his death in 2001. Disciples advance in the Atroshi tariqa by bringing in more recruits. The focus of the pir of Atroshi in developing buildings and institutions, especially a 600-bed hospital and a mosque larger than the Taj Mahal, has influenced the behaviour of other Sufi pir in Bangladesh.

In recent years, Sufis have been subject to religious violence in Bangladesh, part of a broader pattern of violence perpetrated by Islamists against Sufis, Shias, atheists, religious minorities, liberals and foreigners.

== Involvement in politics ==
Islamic rule of Bengal began with Sufi blessings, when Ghiyasuddin Iwaj Shah took power in 1208 claiming to have had the blessing of two dervishes. The Ilyas Shahi dynasty was endorsed by Alaul Haq Pandavi, and the dynasty always had a relationship of mutual patronage with Sufis of the Chishti Order.

In modern times, Sufi pirs have sometimes engaged in Bangladeshi politics. Khwaja Enayetpuri was an "active supporter" of the Muslim League, although he never associated his tariqa with politics. The pir Hafezzi Huzur unsuccessfully contested the Bangladeshi presidential election in 1986. The pir of Atroshi supported the freedom fighters in the Bangladesh Liberation War and in 1989 founded a political party, the Zaker Party, that was opposed to Indian influence but contested the 1991 election without success.

Academic Samuel Landell Mills identifies the increased use of physical objects in Bangladeshi Sufism over other forms of Sufism as an attempt to extend the pir's spiritual authority to a worldly one. Pirs are associated with the places that they teach in, and the growth in material and stature of these places further strengthens their spiritual authority.

== Sufi chains ==
The Qadiri, Razzaqiah, Sureshwaria, Maizbhandaria, Naqshbandi, Chishti, Mujaddid, Ahmadia, Mohammadia, Soharwardi, Abul Ulaiya and Rifa'i orders were among the most widespread Sufi orders in Bangladesh in the late 1980s.

Prominent Sufi personalities in Bangladesh includes Sayyid Muhammad Burhanuddin Uwaysi, Abdul Gafur Hali, Syed Ahmad Ali Urfi Jan Sharif Shah Sureshwari, Syed Shah Muhammad siddiq (A'la Hujur), Syed Shah Muhammad Farooq, Ahmed Ullah Maizbhanderi, Golamur Rahman Maizbhandari aka "Baba Bhandari", Salekur Rahman Rahe Bhanderi, Sayed Delaor Husaein, Sayed Ziaul Haq, Syed Rashid Ahmed Jaunpuri. Sufism in Bangladesh is owed to the saint Khwaja Enayetpuri in Bangladesh, whose family lineage traced back to Baghdad but later on migrated to Delhi. The regular Sufi practice in many of the Khaneghahs in Bangladesh is zikr, assisted with ghazals. The participants of zikr do not perform any other Sama (Sufi music), qawwali, or dance. Sufism in Bangladesh is a silent and spontaneous movement. The Sufis and the Sheikhs in India and Bangladesh are believed to have shown many miracles and divine activities.

== Sufi practices ==
The regular Sufi practice in many of the Khanqahs in Bangladesh is Na`at Sharif and Zikr Sharif. The participants of zikr do not perform any other Sama (Sufi music), qawwali, or dance. The only music performed with the verbal zikr is Na`at, written and sung with rhythm and melody but without any musical instrument, by the poets (performers of zikr). The anniversary of the birth and death of a Sufi pir is observed annually. Popular belief holds that this anniversary is an especially propitious time for seeking the intercession of the pir. Large numbers of the faithful attend anniversary ceremonies, which are festive occasions enjoyed by the followers of the pir as well as orthodox Muslims. Anthropologist Peter J. Bertocci wrote, "Many, if not most, visit the graveside shrines (mazar) of pirs, some at least occasionally, many often, and an untold number rather regularly, throughout their lives".

== List of sufis in Bengal ==
- Jalal al-Din Tabrizi
- Shah Jalal
- Suhrawardiyya
- Syed Mahbub E Khoda
- Arsafm Qudrat E Khoda
- Baba Adam Shahid
- Shah Sultan Rumi
- Makhdum Shah

== See also ==
- Sufism in Pakistan
- Sufism in Sindh
- Sufism in India

== Bibliography ==
- Eaton, Richard M. (1993). The Rise of Islam and the Bengal Frontier, 1204-1760. University of California Press. ISBN 978-0-520-20507-9.
- Khan, Muhammad Mojlum (2013). The Muslim Heritage of Bengal: The Lives, Thoughts and Achievements of Great Muslim Scholars, Writers and Reformers of Bangladesh and West Bengal. Kube Publishing Limited. ISBN 978-1-84774-052-6.
