= Mohammad Ashraf =

Mohammad Ashraf or Muhammad Ashraf is the name of:

- Muhammad Ashraf (translator), Pakistani translator of Quran
- Muhammad Ashraf (wrestler) (born 1927), Pakistani Olympic wrestler
- Mohammad Ashraf Kichhouchhwi (born 1966), Indian Sufi
- Syed Muhammad Ashraf, Indian poet
- Syed Mohammad Izhar Ashraf (1935–2012), Indian imam
- Mohammad Ashraf Naseri (born 1962), Afghan governor of Badghis Province
- Muhammad Ashraf Bukhari (born 1956), Indian bureaucrat
- Mohammad Ashraf Mir, Indian politician
- Mohammad Zahid Ashraf (born 1973), Indian biotechnologist and academic

== See also ==
- Chaudhry Muhammad Ashraf (disambiguation)
- Mohamed Ashraf (disambiguation)
