= Syed Mohammad Izhar Ashraf =

Indian Sufi saint and Islamic scholar (1934–2012)

Syed Mohammed Izhar Ashraf

Sajjadanasheen of Dargah Ashraf Jahangir Semnani
- In office 1996–2012
- Preceded by: Syed Mohammed Mukhtar Ashraf
- Succeeded by: Syed Mahmood Ashraf
- Title: Shaikh-E-Azam, Sajjada Nashin of Aastane Ashrafia Hasania Sarkar e Kalan Kichhauchha Shareef

Personal life
- Born: 1934 Ashrafpur Kichhauchha, Uttar Pradesh, India
- Died: 22 February 2012 (aged 77–78) Ismailia Hospital, Mumbai, India
- Resting place: Dargah, Ashrafpur Kichhauchha, Uttar Pradesh, India
- Region: South Asia
- Main interest: Sufism
- Education: Al Jamiatul Ashrafia

Religious life
- Religion: Islam
- Denomination: Sunni
- Jurisprudence: Hanafi
- Tariqa: Ashrafi; Qadiriyya
- Movement: Barelvi movement

Muslim leader
- Disciple of: Syed Mohammed Mukhtar Ashraf
- Influenced: Mohammad Ashraf Kichhouchhwi
- Children: Syed Mehmood Ashraf; Mohammad Ashraf Kichhouchhwi; Syed Hammad Ashraf; Bibi Zubaida.
- Father: Syed Mohammed Mukhtar Ashraf
- Family: 38th descendant of Muhammed

Syed Mohammed Izhar Ashraf (1934 – 22 February 2012) was an Indian Sufi saint and Islamic scholar belonging to the Barelvi movement of Sunni Islam. He belonged to the Ashrafi family of Kichaucha Sharif and traced his spiritual lineage to the Sufi saint Ashraf Jahangir Semnani. Syed was chief patron of All India Ulema and Mashaikh Board.

== Early life and education ==
He was born to Syed Shah Mukhtar Ashraf and Bibi Sandija in 1934 or 1355 Hijri is Ashrafpur Kichaucha, Uttar Pradesh.

He completed his primary education at Kichhauchha Sharif. After that he went to Ahle sunnat Al Jamiatul Ashrafia Mubarakpur for Dars-i Nizami. He completed his Fazilat course in 1959. He established many madrasas all over India. Ashrafia Izhar-uloloom Machipur is a famous Madras founded by him. Later, he joined Jamia Naeemia Moradabad to teach Islamic education to students.

== Works ==
He had deep interest in Islamic poetry. A compilation of his Nat, Manquabat and Ghazal has published as "Izhare Haquiqat".

=== Social works ===
He is the founder of four Madrasas that follows the teaching of Ahmed Raza Khan Barelvi, the founder of Barelvi movement

- Madrasa Mukhtar Ul Uloom at Chirayya Chowk, Baisi Purnia district, Bihar
- Madrasa Ashrafia Izharuloloom at Bahadurganj, Kishanganj district, Bihar
- Madrasa Ashrafia Izharuloloom at Khushamadpura Malegaon district, Maharashtra
- Madrasa Ashrafia Gulshane Kabir at Bhagalpur, Bihar

== See also ==
- Hashmi Miya
