= Abdur-Razzaq Nurul-Ain =

Sufi saint

Personal life
- Born: 1287-10CE (AH 686) Baghdad, Iraq
- Died: 1407-68CE (AH 808) Ashrafpur Kichhauchha
- Parent: Hasan Abdul Ghafoor (father)
- Other name: Nurul-Ain

Religious life
- Religion: Islam

Muslim leader
- Based in: Ashrafpur Kichhauchha, Northern India
- Period in office: Late 12th century and early 13th century
- Predecessor: Ashraf Jahangir Semnani (needs confirmation as time period is different)
- Successor: Hasan Qattal

Abdur-Razzaq Nurul-Ain ( عبد الرزاق نور العين) was a Sufi saint.

== Works ==
- Maktubate Ashrafi (Letters of Ashraf) compiled by Abdur-Razzaq

== See also ==
- Ashraf Jahangir Semnani
- Alaul Haq Pandavi
- Syed Waheed Ashraf
- Sufi Saints of South Asia
- Syed Shah Muhammad wasil Ashraf
