= Syed Mohammed Moinuddin Ashraf =

Indian Islamic cleric and social activist

Moin-e-Millat Moin Miyan

Personal life
- Born: Syed Mohammed Moinuddin Ashraf; 24 February 1978 (age 48) Ashrafpur Kichhauchha, Uttar Pradesh, India
- Parent: Syed Anwar Ashraf (Musanna Miya) (father)
- Main interest: Sufism
- Education: Al-Jame-atul-Islamia
- Known for: Anti-drug campaigns and community outreach in Mumbai
- Other name: Moin-e-Millat
- Occupation: Islamic scholar, Sufi leader, social activist

Religious life
- Religion: Islam
- Denomination: Sunni
- Lineage: Syed
- Jurisprudence: Hanafi
- Tariqa: Chishti Order (Ashrafi)
- Movement: Barelvi

Muslim leader
- Disciple of: Syed Mohammed Mukhtar Ashraf
- Organization: All India Sunni Jamiyyathul Ulama

Syed Mohammed Moinuddin Ashraf (Urdu: سید محمد معین الدین اشرف; born 24 February 1978), also known as Moin Miyan; honorifically known as Moin-e-Millatis an Indian Sunni Islamic scholar, Sufi spiritual leader and social activist from Ashrafpur Kichhauchha, Uttar Pradesh. He belongs to the Ashrafi branch of the Chishti Order, which traces its spiritual lineage to the medieval Sufi saint Ashraf Jahangir Semnani. He has been associated with religious education, interfaith harmony, social awareness campaigns and public outreach in India.

== Early life and education ==
Moinuddin Ashraf was born on 24 February 1978 in Ashrafpur Kichhauchha, Uttar Pradesh, into a Sayyid family associated with the Ashrafi Sufi tradition. He received his Islamic education at Al-Jame-atul-Islamia, Raunahi, Uttar Pradesh where he studied classical Islamic sciences...

== See also ==
- Ashraf Jahangir Semnani
- Mukhtar Ashraf
- Chishti Order
- Sufism in India
- Barelvi movement
