= Muhammad Madni Ashraf Ashrafi Al-Jilani =

Indian Islamic scholar

Syed Mohammed Madni Ashraf Ashrafi Al Jilani
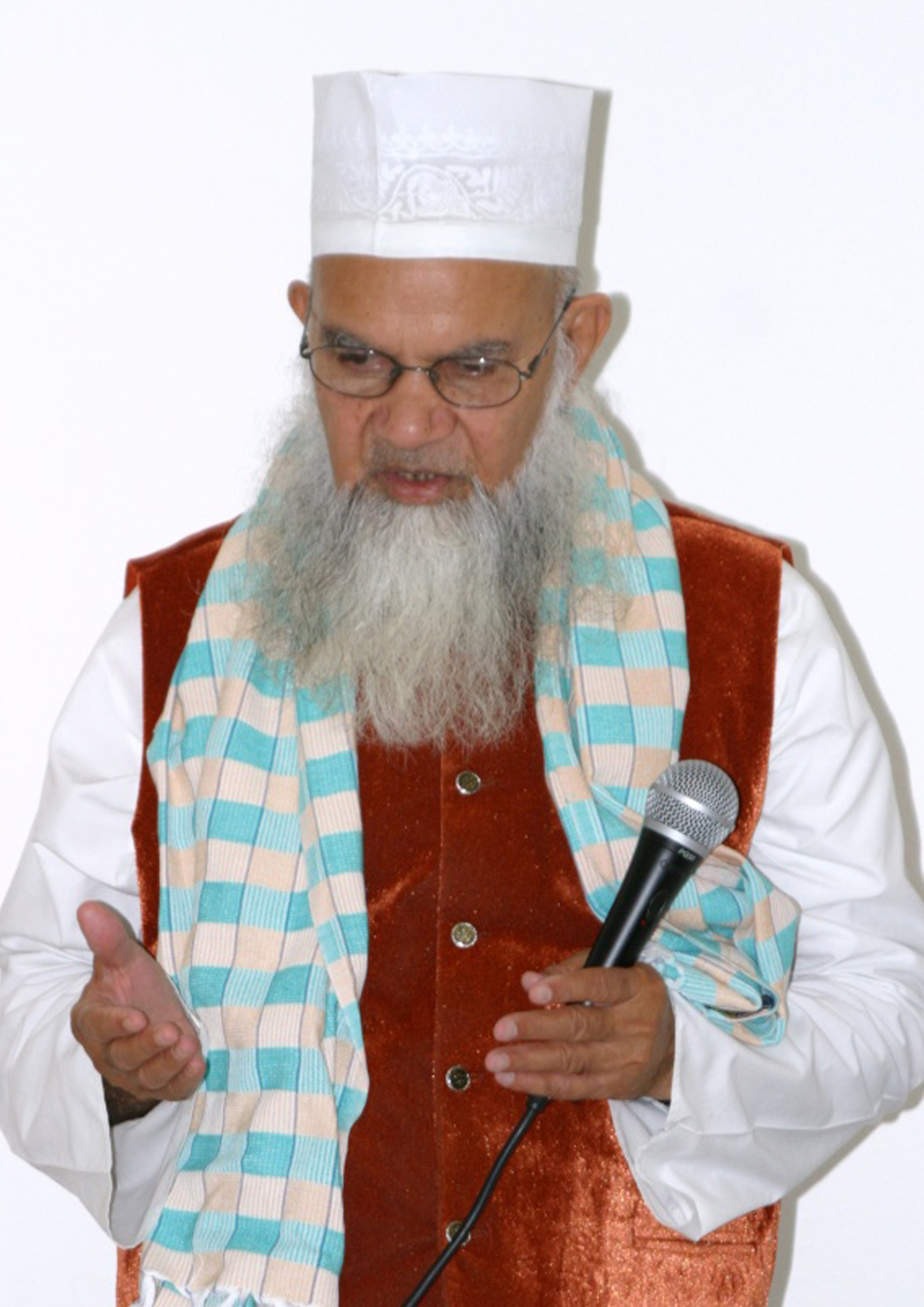

Shaykh al-Islam Mufassir

Personal details
- Born: Mohammed Madni; 28 August 1938 (age 88) Ashrafpur Kichhauchha, Uttar Pradesh, India
- Spouse: Syeda Shamima Khatoon
- Parent: Syed Mohammed Ashraf Ashrafi Al Jilani (Mohaddis-e-Azam-e-Hind) (father)
- Relatives: Hashmi Miyan (brother), Syed Mohammed Mukhtar Ashraf (maternal uncle, known as Sarkar-e-Kalan)
- Education: Al Jamiatul Ashrafia
- Occupation: Islamic scholar

Personal life
- Main interest(s): Sufism,Tafsir, Sharia, Fiqh, Hadith, Quran
- Notable idea(s): Permissibility of videography in Islam (within Shariah guidelines); Usage of modern media for Da'wah
- Notable work: Tafsir-e-Ashrafi

Religious life
- Religion: Islam
- Denomination: Sunni
- Lineage: Syed
- Jurisprudence: Hanafi
- Tariqa: Chishti Order (Ashrafi)

Muslim leader
- Successor: Syed Mohammed Hamza Ashraf Ashrafi Kichhauchhwi
- Disciple of: Syed Mohammed Mukhtar Ashraf

Syed Mohammed Madni Ashraf (Urdu: سید محمد مدنی اشرف), also known as Madni Miyan, (born on 27 August 1938 CE; 1 Rajab 1357 AH) is an Indian Islamic scholar, theologian, Mufti, Sufi spiritual leader, author, and exegete of the Qur'an from Ashrafpur Kichhauchha, Uttar Pradesh, India.

He traces his spiritual lineage to Ashraf Jahangir Semnani, the 14th-century Chishti Sufi saint of Kichhauchha Sharif, after whom the Ashrafi Sufi order is named.

He is the founder of the Mohaddis-e-Azam Mission and Shaikhul Islam Trust.

== Tafsir-e-Ashrafi ==
Tafsir-e-Ashrafi is a classical Sunni interpretation (tafsir) of the Qur'an, begun by his father Mohaddis-e-Azam-e-Hind and completed after his father's death by Madni Ashraf in 2008. It is a popular exegesis of the Qur'an due to its simple style and conciseness. It consists of 10 volumes, originally written in Urdu and later translated into English.

== Books ==
- Islam Ka Tassawure Ila Aur Maududi Sahib
- Deen aur Aqamat e Deen
- Al-Arba'in Al-Ashrafi
- Baran e Rahmat
- Masila Hazir O Nazir
- Inam al-Amal bil Niyyat
- Karamat-e-Ghawth-e-Azam
- Islamic Law
- Muslim Personal Law or Islamic Law?
- Islam Ka Nazriya Ibadat Aur Maududi Sahib
- Dawat e Islami Ka Tanqidi Jaiza
- Farizae Dawat O Tabligh
- Video Aur TV Ka Shariayi Istamal
- Tafhim al-Hadith Sarrah Mhiskat Shareef
- Islam Ka Nazriya Khatme Nabuwat Aur Tehzirun Nas
- Kanz al-Iman Aur Digar Tarazum-e-Quran Ka Taqably Mutalia
- Asri Takaze
- Kitabatun Niswa
- Karamat-e-Ghawth-e-Azam
- Mohabbate Rasool Ruhe Iman
- Rasool-e-Akram Kai Tashreehi Iktiyarat
- Islam Ka Nazriya Ibadat
- Khutbate Hyderabad
- Khutbate Bartannia
- Muhabbat al-Ahl al-Bayt (In English: Love of the Prophet Muhammad's Family)
- Roohani Namaaz
- Sharhe Hadeese Jibrael
- Tafheem al-Hadees

- Tafseer e Ashrafi

== Poetry ==
Writing under the pen-name "Akhtar", he composed poetic collections including:

- Tajalliyat-e-Sukhan (two volumes, ~254 pages)
- Paraan-e-Dil (Nazms and ghazals)
- Baran-e-Rahmat (also listed among his prose works)

== Legacy ==
Madni Miyan is viewed as a Mujaddid (reviver) of the Sufi tradition by his followers.

- He bridged traditional Sufi teachings with modern mediums—such as television and videography—while staying within Sharī‘ah guidelines.
- He actively promoted inter-Sufi unity and stood against sectarian divisions.
- He established institutions such as the Madni Miyan Arabic College, a hospital in his name, and inspired devotional works like the manqabat "Mera Madni Ashraf aa gaya".

== See also ==
- Hashmi Miya
- Mukhtar Ashraf
- Ashraf Jahangir Semnani
- Sufism in India
- Barelvi movement
