= Nur Qutb Alam =

Medieval Sufi saint of Bengal

Shaykh Nūr Qut̤b ʿĀlam Pāndavī

Personal life
- Born: Hazrat Pandua, Bengal
- Died: 1415-1416 AD Hazrat Pandua, Bengal Sultanate
- Resting place: Shash Hazari Dargah, Malda district
- Flourished: Late 14th to early 15th century
- Parent: Alaul Haq (father)
- Relatives: Akhi Siraj (grandfather)

Religious life
- Religion: Islam
- Denomination: Sunni
- Order: Chishti Order
- Jurisprudence: Hanafi

Muslim leader
- Teacher: Alaul Haq; Hamiduddin Nagauri
- Students: Rafaq ad-Din Shaykh Anwar Hussam ad-Din Manikpuri Jalaluddin Muhammad Shah Shah Kaku

Nūr Qut̤b ʿĀlam (Arabic: نور قطب عالم, Bengali: নূর কুতুব আলম) was a 15th-century Bengali Islamic scholar, author and poet. Based in the erstwhile Bengali capital Hazrat Pandua, he was the son and successor of Alaul Haq, a senior scholar of the Bengal Sultanate. He is noted for his efforts in preserving the Muslim rule of Bengal against Raja Ganesha and pioneering the Dobhashi tradition of Bengali literature.

== Early life and family ==
Nur Qutb Alam was born in the city of Hazrat Pandua to a Bengali Muslim family. Alam's cousins, uncles and grandfathers were all employed by the Sultanate of Bengal, with his brother, Azam Khan, serving as the Wazir (Prime Minister). His father, Alaul Haq, was the court scholar of Bengal and entrusted with its treasury during the reign of Sikandar Shah. His grandfather, Shaykh Asʿad Khālidī, migrated to Bengal from Lahore and served as the Sultanate's Finance Minister. Alam was a classmate of Sikandar Shah's son Ghiyasuddin Azam Shah, studying under Qadi Hamiduddin Nagauri in Rajnagar, Birbhum.

== Career ==
Nur Qutb Alam used to do all kinds of manual labour. He personally served his father and the faqirs who came to the khanqah by washing their clothes, carrying water and fuel, keeping water constantly warm for wudu and cleaning the toilets. Other than his children, Shaykh Rafaq ad-Din (father of Shaykh Zahid) and Shaykh Anwar, Alam was also the teacher of Hussam ad-Din Manikpuri and Shah Kaku.

Alam preferred busying himself with spirituality, which is evident from his rejection to his brother Wazir Azam Khan's request to be employed by the government. He performed Hajj (pilgrimage to Mecca) several times.

With the persecution of Bengali Muslims following Raja Ganesha's coup d'état, Nur Qutb Alam wrote a letter to Sultan Ibrahim Sharqi of Jaunpur to liberate Bengal. He also sent a letter to his father's disciple Ashraf Jahangir Semnani, who was in Jaunpur, to also request Sharqi to do so. Responding to the request, Ibrahim Sharqi proceeded towards Bengal, which threatened Ganesha's rule. Ganesha pleaded with Alam to stop the invasion, but Alam's condition was for him to embrace Islam. However, Ganesha's wife forbade her husband to convert and instead they offered his son, Jadu, to the Shaykh. With Alam's guidance and mentorship, Jadu became a Muslim with the name Muhammad, and ascended the throne as Jalaluddin Muhammad Shah. Alam then requested Sharqi to return to Bengal, though he refused, thus continuing the Bengal–Jaunpur confrontation.

== Works ==
Nur Qutb Alam had written at least 121 books, which were all compiled by his Murid Hussam ad-Din Manikpuri. His two magnum opi are Mughīth al-Fuqarā and Anis al-Ghurabā. A manuscript of the former is preserved in a private library at Khalifabagh, Bhagalpur, Bihar. Another incomplete copy is preserved in the library of the Asiatic Society of Bengal in Calcutta (Collection No. 466) alongside two copies of the latter book (Collection No. 1212 and 1213).

Alam also wrote several letters to various important personalities. Thirteen of these were compiled by 'Abd al-Haqq al-Dehlawi under the title Maktūbāt-e-Nūr Qutb ʿĀlam (Writings of Nur Qutb Alam) and are preserved at the National Archives of India in Delhi. He has also written poetry in Persian and Bengali using only the Persian script.

== Death and legacy ==
It is generally accepted that Alam died in 818 AH (1415-16 AD), with the chronogram of this date being Nur Banur-shud (light went into light). This is further evident from date cited by the book in possession of the guardians of his shrine as well as the 17th-century book Mirat al Asrar. His death was followed by Ganesha's second attempt in taking control of Bengal although Ganesha died a few years later.

He was buried near his father at the Shash Hazari Dargah, one of the major dargahs of Bengal; located in Hazrat Pandua and adjacent to the other contemporary scholars of Bengal such as Jalaluddin Tabrizi. Later sultans such as Alauddin Husain Shah (r. 1494–1519) used to make yearly visits to the shrine and was noted for granting a number of villages for maintaining the alms-house and madrasah attached to the Shash Hazari Dargah. Also, one of his descendants constructed the nearby Qutb Shahi Mosque in his honour. During the reign of Emperor Jahangir, the guardian of his shrine was his descendant and successor Mian Shaykh Masud, also known as Shah Muqam. Mughal general Mirza Nathan, author of the Baharistan-i-Ghaibi, paid his respects to the former and spent several days overnight at the shrine.
