= Mohammad Ashraf Kichhouchhwi =

Indian Sufi leader

Syed Mohammad Ashraf Kichhouchhwi
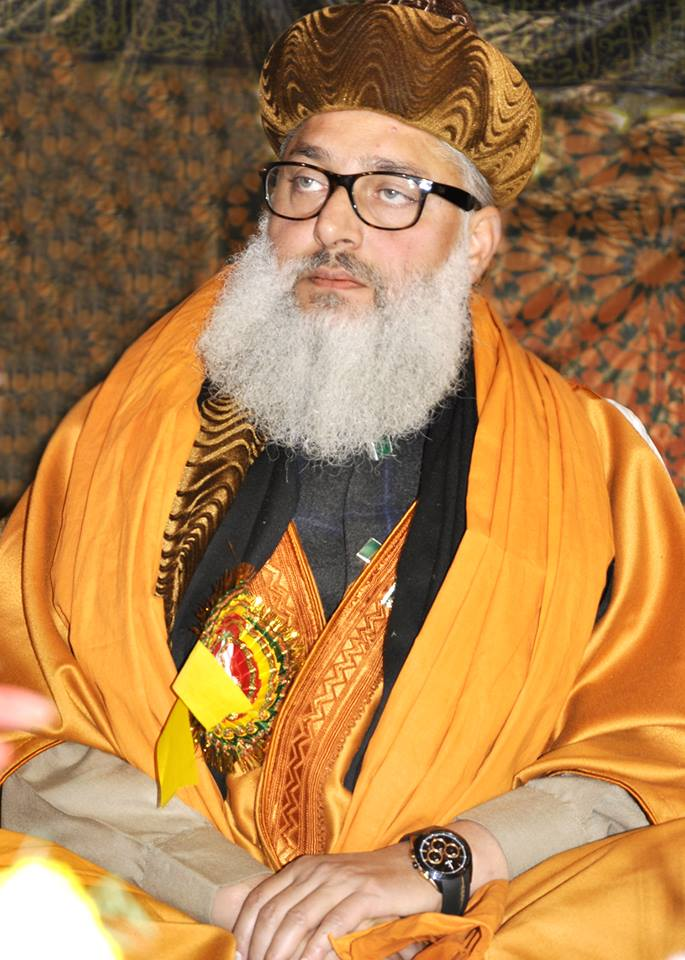

Founder and National President of All India Ulema and Mashaikh Board

Personal details
- Born: 5 July 1966 (age 60) Ambedkar Nagar, Uttar Pradesh, India.
- Spouse: Firdaus Fatima
- Children: Syed Nawaz Ashraf
- Parent: Syed Mohammad Izhar Ashraf (father)
- Education: Aligarh Muslim University, Jame-Ashraf Kichhauchha Shareef
- Occupation: Islamic Scholar
- Known for: Islamic Scholar & Social Leader- Educational and Humanitarian activist

Syed Mohammad Ashraf Kichhouchhwi (born 5 July 1966) is an Indian Sufi leader and spiritual master from Kichhauchha Sharif, the famous Sufi shrine of Ashraf Jahangir Semnani in Ambedkar Nagar in Uttar Pradesh. Kichhauchhwi is a patron of various social, academic and other developmental activities of Sufi Sunni Muslims in India. He is the Founder and National President of the All India Ulema and Mashaikh Board (AIUMB), a Sufi movement in India.

== AIUMB ==
Kichhouchhwi, as leader of the AIUMB, has gathered Sufi clerics and other Muslim leaders in India to build up community resilience against terrorism. Kichhowchhwi led a Sufi delegation that met the Indian PM on 26 August 2015 to raise the concerns of growing extremism in the name of Islam. The delegation members said the spread of terrorism in the name of Islam represents a danger to peace all over the world, and there is urgent need to take action to marginalise the forces which are promoting extremism for social, economic or political considerations. He has said that there is need to spread awareness among the Muslim community that organisations such as the ISIS and al Qaeda do not represent the path of Islam. He gave several suggestions for the promotion of Sufi thought and culture in India, including creation of a "Sufi circuit" to promote tourism, and steps for the rejuvenation of Sufi shrines and sites in India.

Kichhouchhwi opines that "Islam has been conflated in media with extremism... We have to keep the Muslim youths away from the politically motivated 'Islamists' and recognize the real culprits who cause greater defamation of Islam and Muhammad than the Islamophobes".

In recent years, Kichhouchhwi has organized large-scale conferences, popularly known as "Muslim Maha Panchayats", in addition to small gatherings, in many parts of India. In these gatherings, Sufis have declared that they accept neither the religious nor the political leadership of the Wahhabis. The AIUMB plans to organize an international Sufi conference or Religious Leaders' Summit in the beginning of 2016.

=== AIUMB protest against Zakir Naik ===
As a result of Kichhouchhwi's efforts, opposing Muslim preachers and televangelists including Zakir Naik faced protests from the All India Ulama & Mashaikh Board. Naik, who is President of the Mumbai-based Islamic Research Foundation and a frequent public speaker in Muslim countries, organized a public lecture on 17 January 2015 at the India Islamic Cultural Centre (IICC), New Delhi. A large number of Muslims, both Sunnis and Shias, led by All India Ulama & Mashaikh Board, gathered outside the premises of the IICC, strongly protesting against his address at the venue. They held that Naik had not only hurt the sentiments of Shia and Sufi Muslims and non-Muslims, but had also desecrated the values of religious harmony and respect for all faiths. Therefore, they did not think it appropriate for Naik to be a guest-speaker at the IICC, which is meant to stand for communal harmony and amity amongst the people of India.

== Foreign visits and lectures ==
In his visit to the First Asia & Pacific Countries Muslim Religious Leaders' Summit organized by the Presidency of Religious Affairs of Turkey (DİB), Kichhouchhwi stated that at a time when the extremism has penetrated the Asia-pacific countries in different forms, Sufi Ulama, Mashaikh, Imams and muftis, need to oppose the menace of Islamist radicalism and religious extremism. He also stated in his address: "at a time when the extremism has penetrated the Asia-pacific countries in different forms, Sufi Ulama, Mashaikh, Imams and muftis from Morocco to India to Bosnia to Chechnya to Pakistan to UAE to wartorn Syria –including Shia community, have come out to tackle the onslaught of religious extremism... So far, Sufi Islamic scholars and clerics and their organisations have held back the tide of extremism and radicalism."

Kichhouchhwi strongly condemned all groups who are perpetrating terrorist acts in the name of Islam. "Terror is terror, it has no relation to any religion, and it is a grave threat to all humanity", he said. He also condemned the last terror act in Turkey. "No matter which religion it comes from, we condemn such terror incidents, he said. He hoped that the summit would help rebuild deep cultural and historical relations and values between Muslim countries.

== Stance against ISIS, Al-Qaeda, Taliban and other extremist outfits ==
Against the backdrop of a series of coordinated terrorist attacks in Paris on the evening of 13 November 2015, Kichhouchhwi stated: "the Paris attack is not just an aggression against the people of France, but this is an infringement against the universal values of Islam. It was Islam which set example centuries ago by sheltering the Spanish Jews when Spain threw them out. It was Islam which taught Muslims to be the most compassionate towards the strangers and the guests, both Muslims and non-Muslims alike. But the ISIS aims at completely run down the history of Islam which is replete with these universal and egalitarian values".

Syed Muhammad Ashraf also denounced al-Qaeda's plan to form Qaiadat ul Jihad in South Asia.
