= Usman Serajuddin =

14th-century Sufi saint

Akhi `Uthmān Sirāj ad-Dīn Āinā-e-Hind

Personal life
- Born: c. 1258 Gaur, Bengal, Delhi Sultanate
- Died: c. 1357 (aged 98–99) Gaur, Bengal Sultanate (now Malda district, West Bengal, India)
- Resting place: Pirana Pir Dargah, Sadullahpur, Malda, West Bengal
- Flourished: 13th–14th century
- Relatives: Alaul Haq (son-in-law); Nur Qutb Alam (grandson)

Religious life
- Religion: Sunni Islam
- Denomination: Hanafi
- Order: Chishti Order

Senior posting
- Teacher: Fakhruddin Zarradi, Ruknuddin, Nizamuddin Auliya
- Students: Alaul Haq
- Arabic name
- Personal (Ism): Uthman عثمان
- Teknonymic (Kunya): Akhi Siraj أخ سراج
- Epithet (Laqab): Siraj ad-Din سراج الدين
- Toponymic (Nisba): al-Bangali البنغالي; Gauri/Al-Ghawri گوڑی/الغوري

ʿUthmān Sirāj ad-Dīn al-Bangālī (Arabic: عثمان سراج الدين البنغالي; 1258-1357), known affectionately by followers as Akhi Siraj (Bengali: আখি সিরাজ), was a 14th-century Bengali Muslim scholar. He was a Sufi belonging to the Chishti Order and was a disciple of Nizamuddin Auliya of Delhi. As one of the senior disciples of Nizāmuddīn Auliyā, he spent long years with him in Delhi and earned the sobriquet of Āinā-e-Hind (Persian: آینه هند Mirror of India). His shrine, the Pirana Pir Dargah in Gaur, West Bengal, attracts hundreds of thousands of devotees every year. Siraj and his successor, Alaul Haq, are credited with the rise to prominence of the Chishti order in Bengal.

== Early life and education ==
'Abd al-Haqq al-Dehlawi mentions in his Akhbar al Akhyar, the name of Akhi Sirāj Gaurī; which suggests that Siraj was a native of Gaur in Bengal. He is thought to have been born around 1258 CE, when the region was under the rule of the Mamluk dynasty based in Delhi.

As a young man, Siraj travelled to Delhi where he studied under prominent Muslim personalities. Siraj studied with Nizāmuddin and took lessons from Mawlānā Rukn ad-Din, studying Kafiah, Mufassal, the Mukhtaṣar of al-Qudurī and Majma'a-ul Bahrain. Amir Khurd, a disciple and biographer of Nizamuddin Auliya as well as the author of Siyār ul-Awliyā, also participated in these lessons. Siraj completed his studies in a short period of time and became an accomplished scholar, such was his zeal for learning. He was then to be made a senior disciple of Nizamuddin, but was informed that he was still not educated enough. As a result, he was taught the Islamic sciences for a further six months, by Shaykh Fakhr ad-Din Zarradi, a great scholar and another senior disciple of Nizamuddin Auliya. After presenting himself to Nizamuddin, Siraj was then conferred the khirqa (initiatory cloak) of khilafat (succession) and was given the Persian title of Āinā-e-Hind (Mirror of India).

== Later life ==
After receiving khilafat, Siraj remained in Delhi in the company of his mentor Nizamuddin for four years, though continuing to return to Bengal to see his mother once a year. Prior to his death in 1325, Nizamuddin ordered Siraj to return to Bengal to preach. Siraj was present at the bedside of Nizamuddin when he died in 1325 AD. He stayed in Delhi until 1328–1329, at which point he departed for Gaur after the Sultan Muhammad bin Tughlaq had transferred the capital to Daulatabad and forced Delhi's citizens to migrate.

After resettling down in Bengal, Siraj was made the court scholar of Bengal under the government of the Sultan Shamsuddin Ilyas Shah. Siraj established a huge langar kitchen where free food was distributed to the poor and destitute. He also brought some valuable books along with him from the library of Nizamuddin and these books formed the nucleus of the first Chishti khanqah in Bengal. Soon after his arrival in Hazrat Pandua, Alaul Haq became his disciple. Such was his love and devotion to Siraj that when they travelled, like Jalaluddin Tabrizi before him, Alaul Haq would carry a cauldron of hot food on his head even though it would burn his hair, so that he could provide his teacher with warm food on demand. It is said that this even took place during Siraj's numerous Hajj visits, which they would travel by on foot.

He lived and worked in Bengal for the rest of his life and he also married. One of his daughters later married his disciple, Alaul Haq. Amir Khurd, his fellow student, said that he won great esteem from the people of Bengal and "illumined the whole region with his spiritual radiance." Siraj buried the khirqa he received from Nizamuddin in the northwestern corner of the Sagar Dighi.

== Death and legacy ==
In 1357, Akhi Siraj died and was buried in a suburb of Lakhnauti called Sadullahpur. Siraj was succeeded by Alaul Haq.

It is said that he buried the khirqa (robes) that he had received from Sheikh Nizamuddin Auliya in the north-western corner of the Sagar Dighi (reservoir) and ordered that he be buried close to that piece of cloth. He was interred near his buried robes according to his wishes, and a mausoleum was erected over his grave. The date of construction of the mausoleum is not known, but two inscriptions attached to its gateways show that the gateways were erected in the 16th century by Sultan Alauddin Husain Shah and later Sultan Nasiruddin Nasrat Shah. Husain Shah built a siqayah (water fountain) at the mausoleum too. His urs is commemorated annually on Eid al-Fitr (1st and 2nd Shawwaal) and his tomb is still visited by many today. During this event, Jahaniyan Jahangasht's flag (which is kept in Jalaluddin Tabrizi's dargah) and Nur Qutb Alam's handprint are taken to Siraj's mausoleum.

== Sources ==
- Siyar-ul-Auliya p. 368-452
- Akhbar-ul-Akhyar p. 162-3
- Mir'at-ul-Israr p.888-91

== See also ==
- Nasiruddin Chiragh Dehlavi
- Mir Sayyid Ali Hamadani
- Sufi Saints of South Asia
