= Mukhtar Ashraf =

Indian Sufi spiritual leader (1916–1996)

Syed Mohammed Mukhtar Ashraf سید محمّد مختار اشرف
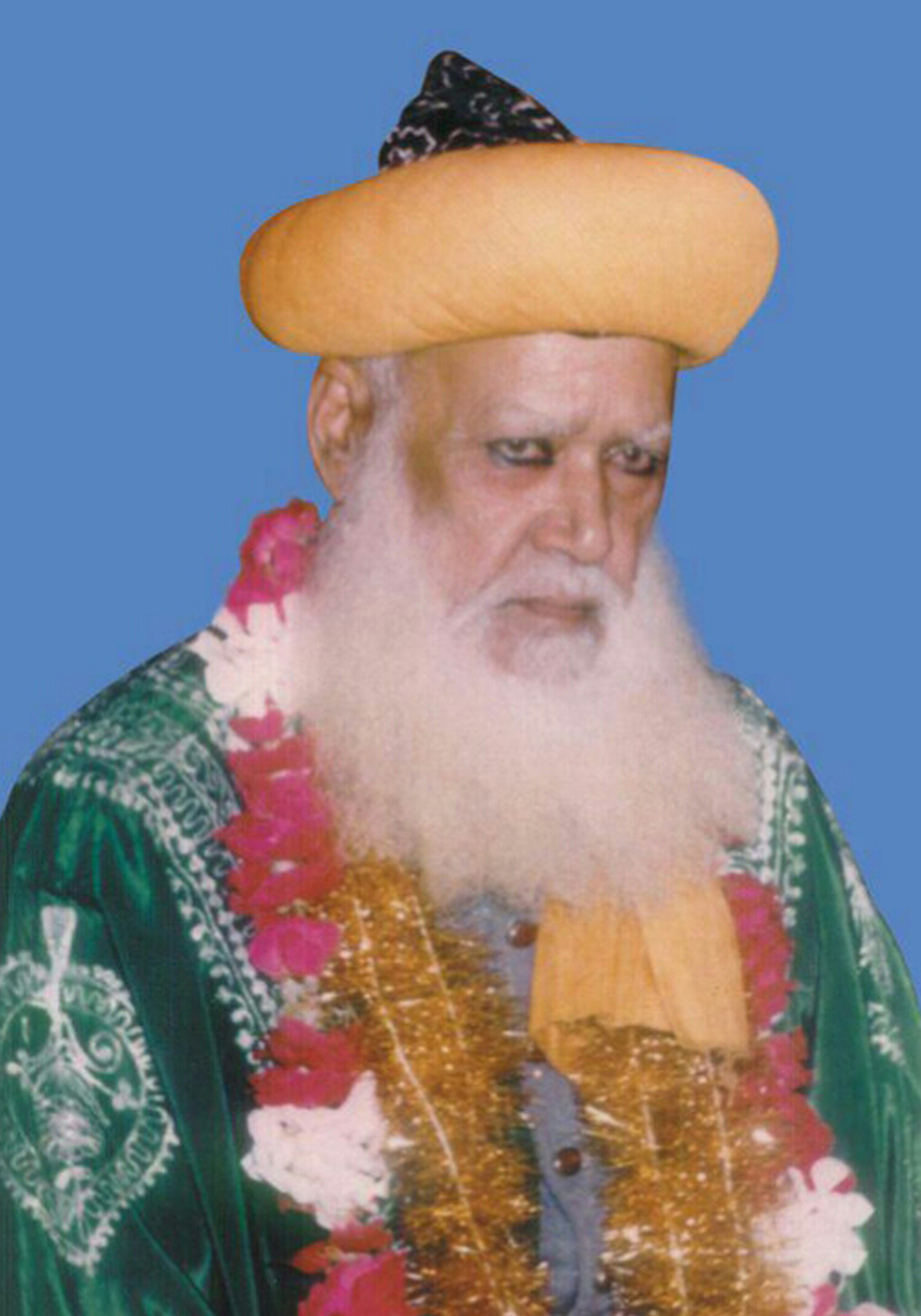
- Sufi Syed Mohammed Mukhtar Ashraf.
- Title: Sarkar E Kalan; Shaikh ul Mashaikh

Personal life
- Born: Mukhtar Ashraf; 4 August 1916 Ashrafpur Kichhauchha, Uttar Pradesh, India
- Died: 21 November 1996 (aged 80)
- Children: Syed Mohammad Izhar Ashraf
- Region: Uttar Pradesh
- Main interest: Sufism
- Other name: Muhammad Miya
- Occupation: Islamic Scholar

Religious life
- Religion: Islam
- Denomination: Ashraf; Sunni
- Jurisprudence: Hanafi
- Tariqa: Ashrafi; Chistiya; Quadriya

Muslim leader
- Disciple of: Syed Mohammed Ahmad Ashraf
- Influenced by: "Aala Hazrat" Ashrafi Miyan
- Influenced: Syed Mohammad Izhar Ashraf Muhammad Madni Ashraf Ashrafi Al-Jilani
- Children: Syed Mohammad Izhar Ashraf; Syed Mohammad Anwar Ashraf
- Father: Syed Mohammed Ahmad Ashraf
- Family: Ashraf

Syed Mohammed Mukhtar Ashraf (Urdu: سید محمد مختاراشرف, Hindi: सैयद मोहम्मद मुख्तार अशरफ़) (born on 4 August 1916 CE; 4 Shawwal 1334 AH) well known as Sarkar E Kalan (Urdu: سرکار کلاں, Hindi: सरकार ए कला) or Makhdoom ul Mashaikh (Urdu: مخدوم المشائخ, Hindi: मख़दूम उल मशाईख) was an Indian Sufi saint, spiritual leader, Islamic Scholar of Ahle Sunnah of the Ashrafi sufi order from Ashrafpur Kichhauchha, Uttar Pradesh, India. He was the Sajjada nashin of Dargah Ashraf Jahangir Semnani, founder of the Ashrafi Sufi Order. Syed died on 21 November 1996 in Ashrafpur Kichhauchha and is buried near dargah of Ashraf Jahangir Semnani.

== Early life ==
Syed was born on 4 August 1916 CE, according to Islamic calendar he was born on 4 Shawwal 1334 AH in Kichhauchha Sharif. He was the son of Sufi Syed Ahmed Ashraf and descendant of Ashraf Jahangir Semnani, founder of the Ashrafi Movement.

== Education ==
He completed his primary Islamic education at Kichhauchha Sharif after he began learning Dars-i Nizami from Maulana Imaduddin Wasi Ahmad Sasarami, Maulana Abdur Rashid Nagpuri and Hazrat Maulana Naimuddin Muradabadi Ashrafi.

== Successor ==
His grandfather Aala Hazrat Ashrafi Miyan nominated him as his Vali Ahad and Spiritual successor at Khanqah-e-Ashrafia Hasania, Kichhauchha Sharif on the occasion of Arbaʽeen of his deceased son Syed Ahmed Ashraf.

== Shrine and Urs ==
His shrine is located near the tomb (dargah) of Ashraf Jahangir Semnani at Kichhauchha Sharif, Ambedkar Nagar, Uttar Pradesh, India. His Urs (demise anniversary) is commemorated on 9 Rajab 1417 AH.

== See also ==
- Hashmi Miya
