= Husam ad-Din Manikpuri =

Medieval Sufi saint

Makhdoom Husāmuddīn Mānikpūrī
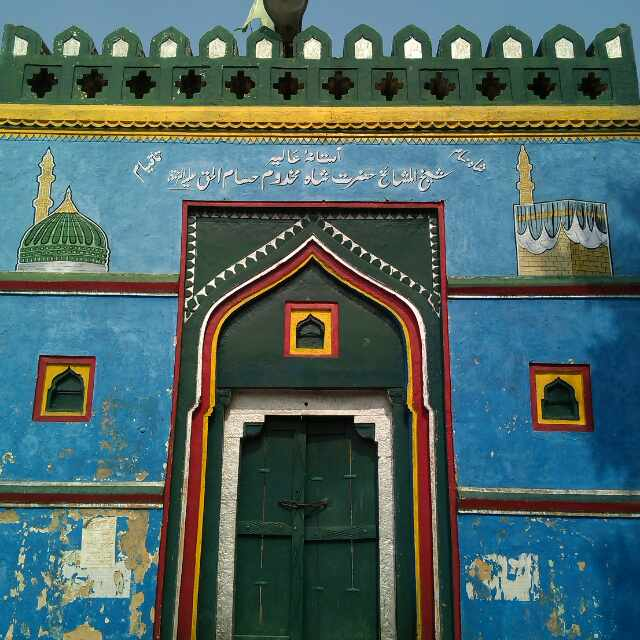
- Manikpuri's tomb

Personal life
- Born: Manikpur
- Died: Date disputed Manikpur
- Resting place: Garhi Manikpur, Pratapgarh, Uttar Pradesh
- Flourished: Late 14th to early 15th century

Religious life
- Religion: Islam
- Denomination: Sunni
- Order: Chishti Order
- Jurisprudence: Hanafi

Muslim leader
- Teacher: Nur Qutb Alam
- Students: Farid bin Salar

Husām ad-Dīn Mānikpūrī (Persian: حسام الدین مانکپوری) was a 15th-century Islamic scholar of North India. He belonged to the Chishti order, following his teacher Nur Qutb Alam of Bengal.

== Life ==
Manikpuri was a descendant of Mir Syed Shahabuddin of the Gardēzī Sadaat family, who had settled in Manikpur during the reign of Iltutmish (r. 1211–1236).

He travelled to the Bengal Sultanate, where he studied under Nur Qutb Alam of Hazrat Pandua. Following his studies, he fasted for seven years.

== Death ==
There is a debate on the date of his death. According to Ghulam Sarwar Lahori, he died on in 882 AH (1477-1478 CE). On the other hand, Hasan Askari asserts that Manikpuri died on 15 Ramadan 853 AH (9 November 1449 CE). Presently, his followers commemorate his annual urs (death anniversary) on 11 March. He is buried in Garhi Manikpur, Pratapgarh, Uttar Pradesh.

== Writings ==
- Anīs al-ʿĀshiqīn
- Rafīq al-ʿĀrifīn, compiled by his disciple Farid bin Salar
- Khulastul Awraad
- Risal e Mahvia
- Maktoobat-e-Mānikpūr
