= Ashrafpur Kichhauchha =

Ashrafpur Kichhauchha Kichhauchha
- Town
- Location in Uttar Pradesh, India
- Coordinates: 26°25′33″N 82°45′25″E
- Country: India
- State: Uttar Pradesh
- District: Ambedkar Nagar

Population (2001)
  - Total: 13,420

Languages
  - Official: Hindi
- Time zone: UTC+5:30 (IST)
- Vehicle registration: UP-45

Ashrafpur Kichhauchha is a town and a nagar panchayat in Ambedkar Nagar District in the state of Uttar Pradesh, India. It is well known worldwide as here the shrine of the Chisti Sufi saint Ashraf Jahangir Semnani is located, which attracts millions of devotees irrespective of religion, caste, creed and sex all the year round. The nearest railway station is the Akbarpur station which is about 23 kilometers. Akbarpur station is connected by rail to big cities such as Kolkata, Delhi, Lucknow, Varanasi and Mumbai.

== Demographics ==
As of 2001 India census, Ashrafpur Kichhauchha had a population of 13,420. Males constitute 51% of the population and females 49%. Ashrafpur Kichhauchha has an average literacy rate of -98%, lower than the national average of 59.5%; with 61% of the males and 39% of females literate. 21% of the population is under 6 years of age.

Religions in Ashrafpur Kichhauchha
Religion	Percent
Hindus	60%
Muslims	39%
Jains	0.5%
Others†	0.5%
Distribution of religions †Includes Sikhs (0.2%), Buddhists (<0.2%).

== Notable people ==
- Ashraf Jahangir Semnani
- Abdur-Razzaq Nurul-Ain
- Syed Amin Ashraf
- Syed Waheed Ashraf
- Syeda Ummehani Ashraf
- Muhammad Madni Ashraf Ashrafi Al-Jilani
- Mukhtar Ashraf
- Hashmi Miya
- Syed Mohammed Moinuddin Ashraf
