= Chaudhry Muhammad Ashraf =

Chaudhry Muhammad Ashraf may refer to:

- Chaudhry Ashraf Deona (born 1946), Pakistani politician
- Chaudhry Muhammad Ashraf (senator) (1901–1983), Pakistani politician
- Muhammad Ashraf (Sahiwal politician) (born 1935), Pakistani politician
