= Alaul Haq =

14th-century Sufi saint

Shaykh al-Mun`im al-Mukarram Alaul Haq Ganj-e-Nābāt

Personal life
- Born: 1301 AD Hazrat Pandua, Bengal
- Died: 1384-1398 AD (aged between 83 and 97) Hazrat Pandua, Bengal Sultanate (now Malda district, West Bengal, India)
- Flourished: Late 12th century
- Parent: As`ad Khālidī (father)
- Relatives: Akhi Siraj (father-in-law), Badr Islam Abu Zahid (grandson)

Religious life
- Religion: Sunni Islam
- Denomination: Hanafi
- Order: Chishti Order

Senior posting
- Teacher: Akhi Siraj, Nizām ul-Haq Sarfī
- Students: Ashraf Jahangir Semnani, Nur Qutb Alam
- Arabic name
- Personal (Ism): Umar عمر
- Patronymic (Nasab): ibn As'ad بن أسعد
- Epithet (Laqab): Ala al-Haq wa ad-Din علاء الحق والدين; Ala al-Haq علاء الحق
- Toponymic (Nisba): al-Khalidi الخالدي al-Bangali البنغالي; Pandawi/Al-Bandawi پانڈوی/الباندوي

Alā ul-Ḥaq wa ad-Dīn ʿUmar ibn As`ad al-Khālidī al-Bangālī (Arabic: علاء الحق والدين عمر بن أسعد الخالدي البنغالي), commonly known as Alaul Haq (Bengali: আলাউল হক) or reverentially by the sobriquet Ganj-e-Nābāt (Persian: گنج نابات, Bengali: গঞ্জ-এ-নাবাত), was a 14th-century Islamic scholar of Bengal. Posted in Hazrat Pandua, he was the senior disciple and successor of Akhi Siraj, and a Bengal Sultanate government official.

== Early life and education ==
Alaul Haq Umar was born in 1301, in the city of Hazrat Pandua to a Muslim family. His father, Shaykh As`ad Khālidī, migrated from Lahore to Pandua where he served as the Finance Minister of the Sultanate of Bengal. His uncles, cousins and brothers also held high ranks in the Sultanate court. Some sources claim that Haq was first taught by Nizamul Haq Sarfi, who was a senior scholar of Bengal based in Lakhnauti and teacher of Nasiruddin Bahath. This claim however, has been doubted by others due to issues relating to time periods. After the death of his father, Haq was meant to have inherited two gardens worth 8000 takas though someone else had taken possession of them. Haq never attempted to regain the inherited property.

Excelling in his studies, Alaul Haq began calling himself Ganj-e-Nābāt and gained popularity in Bengal. This act was criticised by Nizamuddin Auliya of Delhi, as his teacher was Ganj-e-Shakar (treasure of sugar), and the title of Ganj-e-Nabat (store of fine sugar) was a sign of arrogance and superiority. Akhi Siraj of the Chishti Order returned to Bengal on the advice of his teacher, Nizamuddin Auliya, where he was appointed as the country's court scholar. Alaul Haq became his student and dropped the Ganj-e-Nabat title. There are many stories relating to Haq's relationship with his mentor Siraj. It is said that Haq would accompany his teacher with a cauldron on his head, and carrying an oven whilst barefooted so his teacher could have hot meals, and would often have to walk in such a state in front of the homes of his relatives. This eventually led to Alaul Haq suffering from alopecia. This supposedly even took place during Siraj's numerous Hajj visits.

Alaul Haq was admired by his teacher Siraj to such an extent that he was made his successor and the husband of Siraj's daughter.

== Career ==
Following the death of Siraj, Haq served as the court scholar; setting up a khanqah in Hazrat Pandua and becoming an elite member of the Sultan of Bengal Shamsuddin Ilyas Shah's government. During the reign of Sultan Sikandar Shah, Haq was put in charge of the royal treasury of the Bengal Sultanate.

It is said that Alaul Haq was so generous to his students and the needy that his generosity outweighed that of the Sultan. As a result, he was banished to Sonargaon for two years before being allowed to return to his Khanqah. Ashraf Jahangir Semnani, a former ruler of Semnan in modern-day Iran, had abdicated his throne to become a student of Alaul Haq in Pandua. His journey took two years and upon meeting Haq and his disciples in the outskirts of Pandua, Semnani was carried by doli to Haq's khanqah where he was fed four handfuls of rice and paan by Alaul Haq. Semnani studied under Alaul Haq for 1

2 years, before being instructed by him to go and propagate in Jaunpur.

نهاده تاج دولت بر سر من، علاء الحق والدین گنج نابات
Ala al-Haq wa ad-Din Ganj-i-Nabat has placed the crown of Dawlat upon my head

— Persian couplet recited by student Ashraf Jahangir Semnani after being received by Alaul Haq at the khanqah

== Death ==
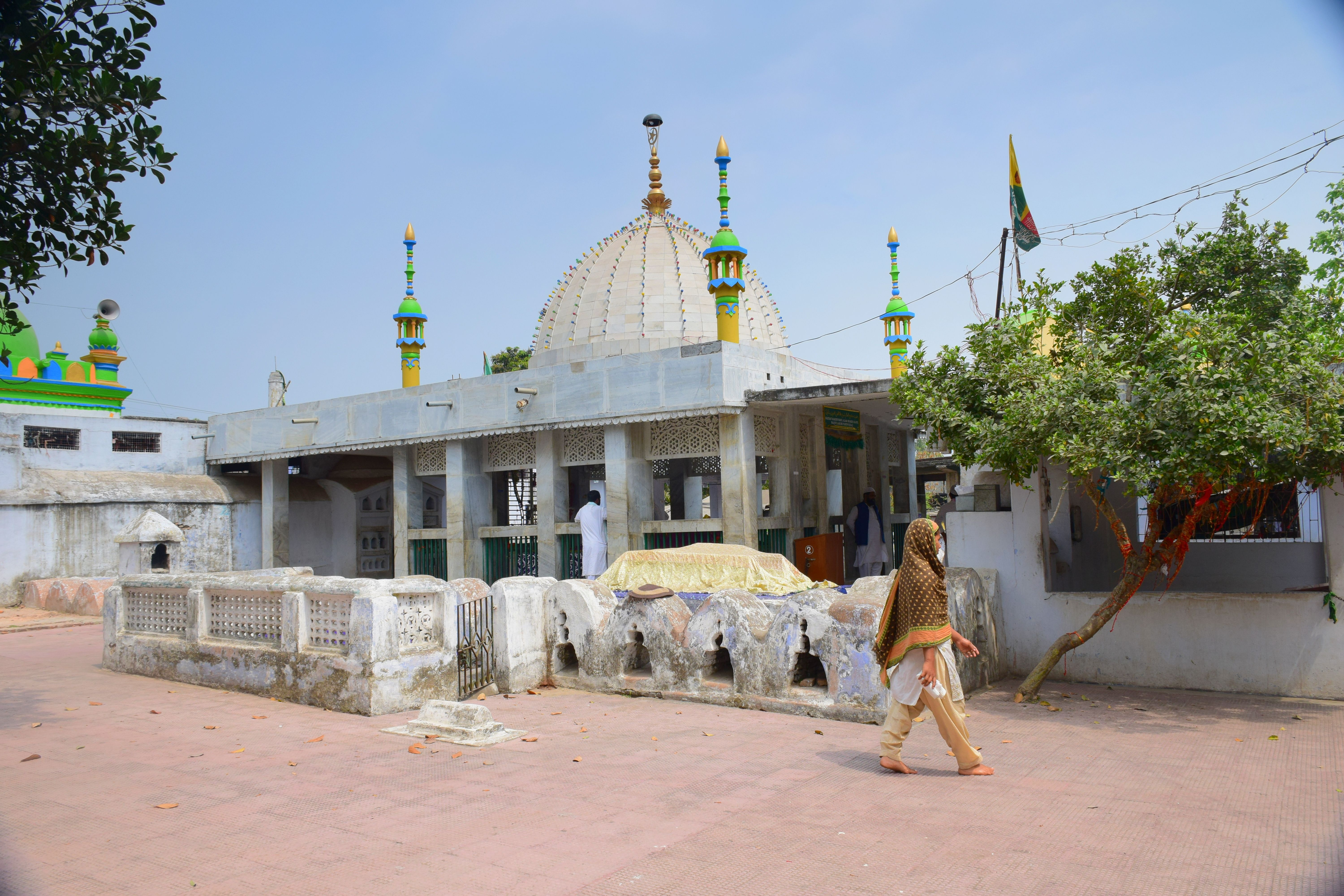
The historic Chhoti Dargah cemetery in Hazrat Pandua.

It is suggested by 'Abd al-Haqq al-Dehlawi, in his Akhbar al Akhyar, that Alaul Haq died in the year 800 AH (1398 AD). On the other hand, the guardians of Haq's shrine possess a book which cites his death in 786 AH (1384 AD). It has also been said that Alaul Haq's janaza was performed by Jahaniyan Jahangasht. His shrine, the Chhoti Dargah, is one of the major dargahs of Bengal; located in the ruined city of Hazrat Pandua in Malda and adjacent to the other contemporary scholars of Bengal such as Jalaluddin Tabrizi. Haq's disciples included his son Nur Qutb Alam (who was his successor), as well as the Sufi saints Ashraf Jahangir Semnani and Husayn Dhukkarposh. His urs is commemorated from 23 to 25 Rajab in Chhoti Dargah, presently in West Bengal, India. Alaul Haq's grandson, Badr Islam, and his great-grandson, Shaykh Zahid, were prominent scholars in Sonargaon.

== See also ==
- Mir Sayyid Ali Hamadani

== Bibliography ==
- Abdal Haqq Muhaddith Dehlwi [d.1052H-1642 CE]. Akhbarul Akhyar.: A short biography of the prominent Sufis of India have been mentioned in this book including that of Alaul Haq Pandavi
- 'Mir'at-ul-Israr' by Syed Abdur Rahman Chisti
- 'Lataife-Ashrafi' (Discourses of Ashraf Jahangir Semnani) Compiled by Nizam Yemeni, Edited and annotated by Syed Waheed Ashraf, published in 2010
- 'Ma'arijul-Wilayat'
- 'Hayate Makhdoom Syed Ashraf Jahangir Semnani(1975), Second Edition(2017) ISBN 978-93-85295-54-6, Maktaba Jamia Ltd, Shamshad Market, Aligarh 202002, India
