= Manikpur, Pratapgarh =

Town in Uttar Pradesh, India

Garhi Manikpur is a town and a nagar panchayat in Pratapgarh district in the Indian state of Uttar Pradesh.

== Geography ==
Manikpur is located at 25°55′59″N 81°58′59″E25.933°N 81.983°E.[1] It has an average elevation of 178 metres (583 feet). Manikpur is nagar panchayat in UP state.

== Demographics ==
As of 2001 India census, Manikpur had a population of 13,455. Males constitute 52% of the population and females 48%. In Manikpur, 19% of the population is under 6 years of age.

== Town ==
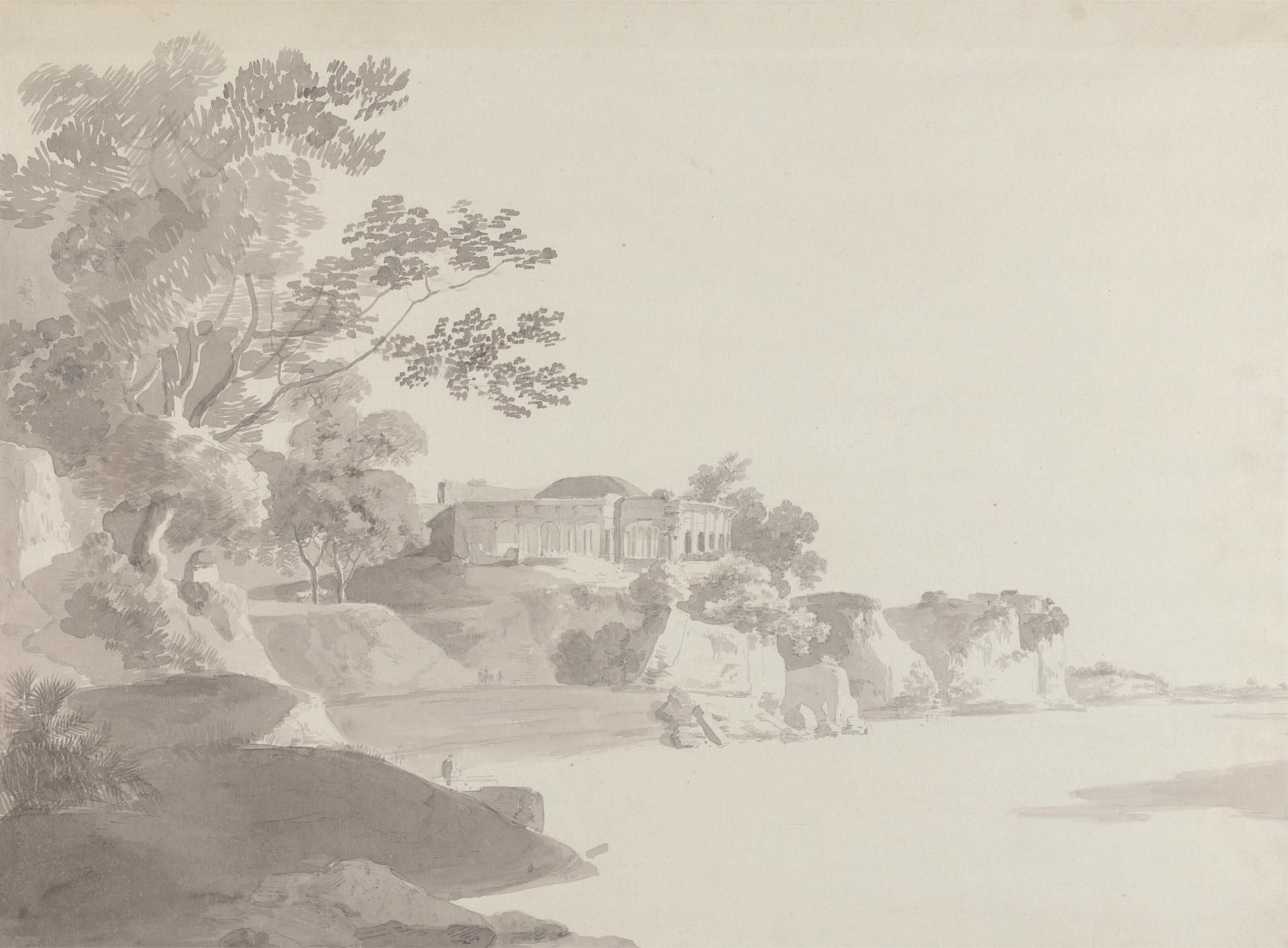
Manickpur on the Ganges, William Daniell, ca. 1788

The town is often called Manikpur-on-the-Ganges, or the "town of kings and saints", the name of the kings inhabiting Manikpur are Alauddin Khalji, Jalaluddin Khalji, Balban, Raja Manikchand, Raja Tassuq Husain (Father in Law of Nawab Wajid ALi Shah of Awadh). Manikpur is also famous for khoya (mava). It is often linked with its sister town across the river Ganges, Kara, 8.5 km (5.3 mi) downriver. To this day Kara, is often called Kara-Manikpur. Kara falls in Kaushambi district while Manikpur has now become a part of Pratapgarh district.

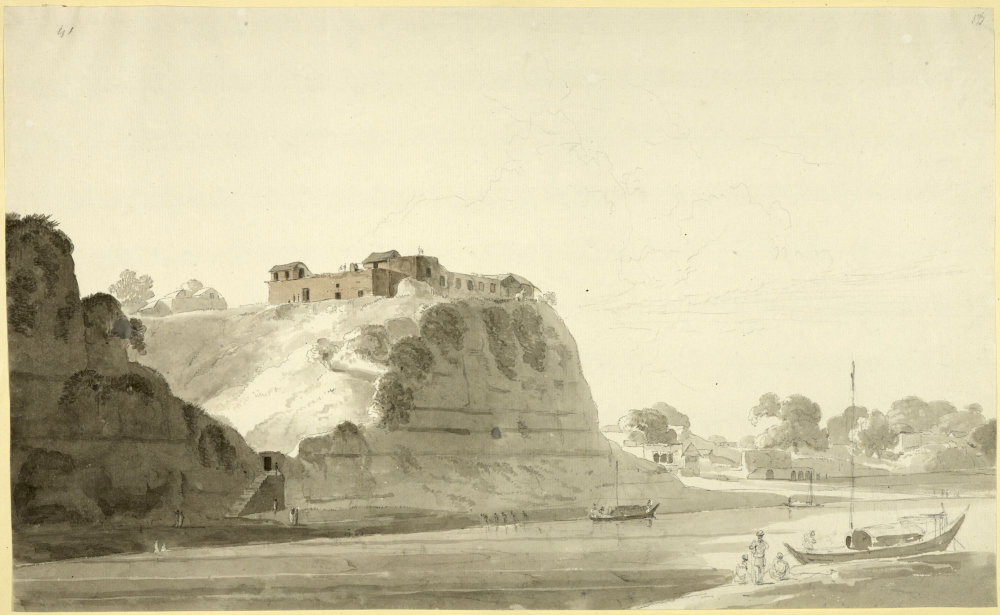
Another view of Manickpur, from the River Ganges, ca. 1828

There is a great controversy regarding the establishment of the town. The place is said to have been founded in 1638. The city still has some architectural remains which tell the history & reflect its glorious past. Manikpur Town is 2nd oldest town of Uttar Pradesh. Following structures are present in Manikpur and its adjacent area:

1. Old Fort of Manikchand: This old fort is about 1.5 km from the city, near Aliganj crossing of Garhi area and stands on a 36.5-metre high steep cliff overhanging the River Ganges. The mound is covered with broken bricks. The discoveries, around this site, date it back to early Hindu period.
2. Mosque: On the northern extremity of the mound of Fort of Manikchand (in Shahabad area), there is a small mosque, which is said to have been built by Emperor Shahjahan. The mosque is also known as Shahi Mosque.
3. Chihul Satun or Hall of Forty Pillars: The monument was constructed by King Sayyad Abdul Quadir and is one of the important architectural remains of Manikpur, located in Shahabad area. The structure, built of stones brought from Fatehpur Sikiri, is not intact. Great portion of the building has disappeared but remaining structure gives the idea of its splendor. Stone carvings on the structure are deep and well defined and each of the overhanging corbel bears the text from Qur'an. Major portion of the carving had been taken away by Asif-ud-dulla, Nawab of Awadh, to decorate his great Imambara of Lucknow.

Besides these buildings, there are many mosques & temples scattered in Manikpur area. Satya Sai Kuti, (built in 1944, about 1.5 km from Aliganj crossing on the mount of the fort), Jwala Devi temple is the great historical and very old temple of Maa "Jwala" in Manikpur Town. He has a story of "Dvapara Yuga" related to Lord Krishna's birth time Yogmaya role. Manikpur Town is a very holy and visitor place. Maa Jwala temple and sacred banks of the Ganges, due to many pilgrims every Purnima after bathing in the Ganges, the Maa Jwala vision to far away come from mausoleum of Shah Husamal, the great Fakir, are worth mentioning. Manikpur is famous for mangoes, Guava & Amla.

Transport Manikpur is connected by railway with Allahabad, Lucknow, Kanpur, Delhi and many more North Indian cities. Road- can be accessed by road via Allahabad-Lucknow road (NH-24B) from Allahabad, and via NH-96 from Chitrakoot Rail-Northern Railway Line connects Garhi Manikpur with other major cities of the state Air-Bamrauli Airport (Allahabad) about 80.

In the 1700s, Raja Muhammad Khan who belonged to the Sayyid tribe of Manikpur was the Mir-i-Atish, or artillery chief, of the Mughal Emperor Jahandar Shah.

== See also ==
- Husam ad-Din Manikpuri
- Urdu-speaking people
