= Mohamed Ashraf =

Mohamed Ashraf could refer to:

- Mohamed Ashraf Roqa, Egyptian football midfielder
- Mohamed Ashraf (footballer, born 2001), Egyptian football defender
- Ashraf Mohamed, Egyptian weightlifter

== See also ==
- Mohammad Ashraf (disambiguation)
