= Hashmi Miya =

Indian Muslim Scholar

Syed Mohammad Hashmi Ashraf
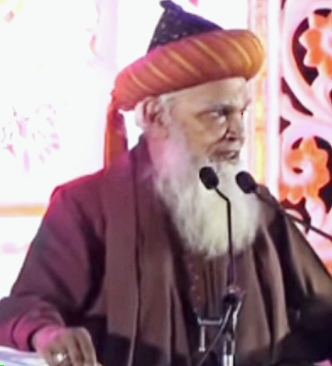
- Hashmi Miya

Personal details
- Born: Mohammed Hashmi; 8 July 1947 (age 79) Ashrafpur Kichhauchha, United Provinces, British India
- Children: 1.Syed Mohammed Noorani Ashraf 2.Syed Muhammad Subhani ashraf 3.Syed Muhammad Samdani Ashraf
- Parent: Mohammed Abul Muhamid Ashraf (father)
- Relatives: Madani Miya (older brother)
- Education: Al Jamiatul Ashrafia
- Occupation: Islamic scholar
- Title: Ghazi-e-Millat

Personal life
- Main interest: Sufism
- Notable idea(s): Let us know about the followers of Islam and their deeds and Islam gives the message of peace.

Religious life
- Religion: Islam
- Denomination: Sunni Barelvi
- Lineage: Syed
- Jurisprudence: Hanafi
- Tariqa: Ashrafi

Muslim leader
- Disciple of: Syed Mohammed Mukhtar Ashraf

Syed Mohammed Hashmi Miyan (Urdu سید محمد ہاشمی میاں) is an Indian Sunni Sufi Barelvi scholar and preacher. He is recognised as Ghazi-e-Millat (warrior of the community). He is followed by many Hindi and Urdu speakers,

According to one British website Hashmi Miyan is the youngest son of Muhaddis e Azam e Hind.

He is the younger brother of Madni Miya.

== Views ==
He had opposed the Citizenship Amendment Act, quoting that it is fine to eliminate the illegal immigrants from India, but it is quite difficult for all the Indian citizens to prove their residence-ship in India. He believes that there is no religion of terrorism.

== Literary works ==
Hashmi Miyan's literary works include

- Lataif e Deoband
- Rusumaat o Moharram o Taaziya
- Hazrat Amir e Muawiya Khalifa-e-Rashid
- Khutbaat e Hashmi Miyan
