= Syed Waheed Ashraf =

Indian Sufi scholar and poet

- Title: Allama, Sheikh-e-Tariqat

Personal life
- Born: 4 February 1933 (age 93)
- Era: Present
- Region: India
- Main interest: Sufism
- Notable work(s): Sufism, Arabic, English, Persian and Urdu quatrains (Ruba'i) and Naʽat, Persian and Urdu literary criticism, Islamic studies

Religious life
- Religion: Islam

Syed Waheed Ashraf (born 4 February 1933) is an Indian Sufi scholar and poet in Persian and Urdu.

== Education and career ==
Ashraf received his B.A., M.A. and Ph.D. (1965) degrees from Aligarh Muslim University. The title of his doctoral dissertation was A Critical Edition of Lataif-e-Ashrafi. After serving at a number of Indian universities (Punjabi University at Patiala, Maharaja Sayajirao University of Baroda at Vadodara and the University of Madras), Ashraf retired as head of the department of Arabic, Persian and Urdu at the University of Madras at Chennai in 1993. Fluent in seven languages (Middle Persian, New Persian, Arabic, English, Hindustani [Hindi-Urdu] and Gujarati), he writes in Urdu, Persian and English, has written, edited or compiled over 35 books. Ashraf has focused on upholding and propagating the principles and practices of Sufism.

== Works ==
=== Books ===
==== Sufism and Islamic studies ====
===== Urdu =====
- Hayat-e-Makhdoom Syed Ashraf Jahangir Semnani First Edition (1975) Second Edition (2017) ISBN 978-93-85295-54-6, Maktaba Jamia Ltd, Shamshad Market, Aligarh, Uttar Pradesh, India 202002HAYATE MAKHDOOM SYED ASHRAF JAHANGIR SEMNANI (2nd Ed.), 2017, OL 26384309M
- Tasawwuf (Part I) (1988), Reprint (2016) ISBN 978-93-85295-28-7, Maktaba Jamia Ltd, Shamshad Market, Aligarh, Uttar Pradesh, India 202002
- Tasawwuf (Part II) (2020), ISBN 978-93-85295-13-3, Maktaba Jamia Ltd, Shamshad Market, Aligarh, Uttar Pradesh, India 202002
- Tafsīr-e-Ashrafi (Iradat), Part I
- Tafsīr-e-Ashrafi (Bayat), Part II
- Qāal-Alashraf
- Qāal-Ussufia
- Me'rāj Sharīf (2003)
- Roza (1996)
- Mumin (2003)
- Hajje Tamattu (2010)-
- Chand Duyain Aur Mukhtasar Aurad-e-Ashrafia (Urdu and Arabic, 2007)

===== Persian =====
- Jawahir-us-Sulūk (translated and illustrated)
- Latāif-e-Ashrafi and Maktubāt-e-Ashrafi As Sources of History of Medieval India (sponsored by the Indian Council of Historical Research)
- Muqaddema-e-Latāif-e-Ashrafi. Maharaja Sayajirao University of Baroda, 1976.مقدمۀ لطايف اشرفي
- Latāif-e-Ashrafi, part I (edited and annotated, 2010)
- Latāif-e-Ashrafi, part II (edited and annotated, 2010)
- Latāif-e-Ashrafi, part III (edited and annotated, 2010)

===== English =====
- The Exoteric and Esoteric Aspects of Islamic Prayers (2005)

==== Poetry ====
===== Urdu =====
- Ruba'i (1987)
- Tajalliyāt First Ed.(1996), Second Ed.(2018) ISBN 978-93-85295-76-8, Maktaba Jamia Ltd, Shamshad Market, Aligarh, Uttar Pradesh, India 202002
- Lamhaat First Ed.(1998), Second Ed.(2023) ISBN 978-93-85295-76-8, Maktaba Jamia Ltd, Shamshad Market, Aligarh, Uttar Pradesh, India 202002
- Munājāt First Ed.(2002), Second Ed.(2022) ISBN 978-93-85295-36-2, Maktaba Jamia Ltd, Shamshad Market, Aligarh, Uttar Pradesh, India 202002
- Āyāt First Ed.(1996), Second Ed.(2020) ISBN 93-85295-12-8, Maktaba Jamia Ltd, Shamshad Market, Aligarh, Uttar Pradesh, India 202002
- Saughāt (2005)
- Chainama (2016)
- Barakaat First Ed.(2021), ISBN 978-93-84434-62-5, Maktaba Jamia Ltd, Shamshad Market, Aligarh, Uttar Pradesh, India 202002

===== Persian =====
- Parwaaz-e-Tafakkur (2015)
- Ruba'i: Part I (2010)
- Ruba'i: Part II
- Daryā Bi Qatrah (2009)

==== Criticism ====
===== Urdu =====
- Fida (Pupil of Ghalib; Co-Author Malik Ram; First Edition 1983, Second Edition 2015)
- Afsar Maudoodi
- Mutalae Afsar Maudoodi (2012)
- Muqaddema-e-Rubai First Ed.(2001), Reprint (2019) ISBN 978-93-85295-00-4, Maktaba Jamia Ltd, Shamshad Market, Aligarh, Uttar Pradesh, India 202002
- Urdu Zaban Mein Na'at-Gō'ī Ka Fan
- Rūh-e-Mahmood
- Tauzeehāt

===== Persian =====
- Tafheemāt
- Qasāid-e-Zauqi Vellori (translated, illustrated and edited)

==== Letters ====
- Irtibāt-o-Inekaas (Urdu and English)

=== English ===
- "The Political and Economic Thoughts of Hadrat Saiyed Ashraf Jahangir", Indo-Iranica, The Quarterly Organ of the Iran Society, Volume 56, March, June, September and December 2003, Numbers 1 to 4. Iran Society, 12 Dr. M. Ishaque Road, Kolkata, West Bengal, India 700016.
- "Avicenna's Explanation of Destiny",Indo-Iranica, The Quarterly Organ of the Iran Society, Volume-34: Nos: 1 to 4: March- Dec: 1981: IBN SINA NUMBER Iran Society, 12 Dr. M. Ishaque Road, Kolkata, West Bengal, India 700016
- "Nationalism in Urdu Poetry" Annals of Oriental Research, University of Madras, Volume 31 (1982), p. 391.
- "An Introduction to the Persian Poetry of Iqbal" in Annals of Oriental Research, University of Madras, Volume 30i (1980), p. 1-14.
- "Modern Persian Prose" Annals of Oriental Research, University of Madras, Volume xxviii, part 2 p. 1-8 (1979)
- "Sufism" ,Annals of Oriental Research, University of Madras, Volume 32(I) (1984), p. 55-72.
- "The contribution of the House of Qutb-e-Vellore to Persian Literature", Annals of Oriental Research, University of Madras, pages 1–22, volume xxx part2 (1981)
- "A Scholastic Approach To Some Muslim Religious Movements In India During 14th Century A.H., Annals of Oriental Research, University of Madras, Pages 1–30, Volume xxxi part 1, (1982)

=== Urdu ===
- Urdu Mein Na-at Goi Ka Fan - Naat Rang - Vol. 14 (اردو میں نعت گوئی کا فن ،- ڈاکٹر سیّد وحید اشرف کچھوچھوی)
- Nafhat-ul-Uns par Tahqeeqi Nazar(1), Maarif, Darul Musannafein, Azamgarh, Jan. 1966
- Nafhat-ul-Uns par Tahqeeqi Nazar(2), Maarif, Darul Musannefin Shibli Academy, Azamgarh, Uttar Pradesh, India, Feb. 1966
- Tareekh-e-Paidaisho Wafaat Hazrat Syed Ashraf Jahangir Semnani, Maarif, Darul Musannefin Shibli Academy, Azamgarh, Uttar Pradesh, India, Mar. 1966
- Tasawwuf-e-Islami Par Ek Hindustani Kitaab (1), Maarif, Darul Musannafein, Azamgarh, Aug. 1968
- Tasawwuf-e-Islami Par EK Hindustani Kitaab (2), Maarif, Darul Musannafein, Azamgarh, Sept. 1968
- Tasawwuf-o-Suluk Shah Hamdani Ki Tahreeron Mein (1), Maarif, Darul Musannafein, Azamgarh, Jan. 1989
- Tasawwuf-o-Suluk Shah Hamdani Ki Tahreeron Mein (2), Maarif, Darul Musannafein, Azamgarh, Feb. 1989
- Khwaja Hafiz Sheerazi Ki Shairi Mein Sulook (1), Maarif, Darul Musannafein, Azamgarh, Nov. 1991
- Khwaja Hafiz Sheerazi Ki Shairi Mein Sulook (2), Maarif, Darul Musannafein, Azamgarh, Dec. 1991
- Iqbal Ki Faarsi Shairi par Ek Ijmaali Nazar (1), Maarif, Darul Musannefin Shibli Academy, Azamgarh, Uttar Pradesh, India, Jan.1995
- Iqbal Ki Faarsi Shairi par Ek Ijmaali Nazar (2), Maarif, Darul Musannefin Shibli Academy, Azamgarh, Uttar Pradesh, India, Mar.1995
- Amir Khusro Bahaisiat-e-Faarsi Rubai Nigaar, Maarif, Darul Musannefin Shibli Academy, Azamgarh, Uttar Pradesh, India, Feb. 2001
- Abdul Qadir Fakhri Maharban, Maarif, Darul Musannefin Shibli Academy, Azamgarh, Uttar Pradesh, India, Oct.2002
- Hazrat Zauqi Ki Farsi Shairi, Maarif, Darul Musannefin Shibli Academy, Azamgarh, Uttar Pradesh, India, May 2003
- Ahmad Raza Ki Farsi Aur Urdu Shairi, Al-Meezan Monthly, Mumbai, Maharashtra, India; Imam Ahmad Raza (1976)
- Masnavi Asrar-e-Khudi Ki Fikri Buniyaad, Ziya-e-Wajeeh Monthly, Rampur, Uttar Pradesh, India

=== Persian ===
- Rubaiyaat (Amir Khusrau)
- Mutala'-e-Hafiz Shirazi Az Hais Zabaan-o-Sabk Bayaan, Danish 56-57, 3645 (Persian: مطالعه خواجه حافظ شیرازی از حیث زبان و سبک بیان، دانش ۵۶ و ۵۷، ۳۶۴۵)
