= All India Ulema and Mashaikh Board =

Sufi-orientated organisation in India

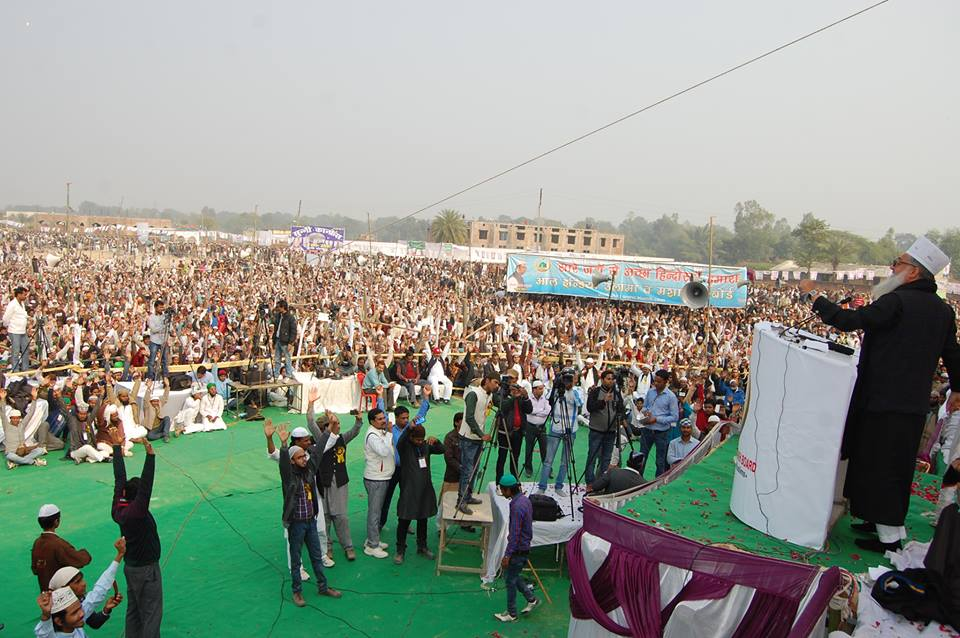
- AIUMB Sunni Conference in Amethi, Uttar Pradesh.
- Founder: Mohammad Ashraf Kichhouchhwi
- Location: House No. 20, Second Floor, First Lane, Johri Farm, Okhla, New Delhi, India
- National President: Syed Mohammad Ashraf
- Chief Patron: Pir Khwaja Ahmad Nizami
- Affiliations: Jamat-e-Ahle Sunnat Karnataka & World Urdu Association
- Website: aiumb.org

The All India Ulama & Mashaikh Board (abbreviated as AIUMB) (Note: is a body of Sufi-orientated Indian Sunni Muslims. It was founded by Mohammad Ashraf Kichhouchhwi. It is a representative body consisting of the Sajjada Nasheen (Patrons-in-Chief) of Dargahs, imams of mosques, Muftis and teachers of madrasas.) is an Islamic Non-governmental Organisation and a representative body consisting the Sajjadanasheens of Dargahs, Imams of Mosques, the Teacher and Muftis working in the Madrasa belonging to the Barelvi movement of Sunni Islam. It was established in all the states and territories of India. It was formally founded by Mohammad Ashraf Kichhouchhwi.

Initially started as representative body of Sunni Sufi Muslims of India, Currently, the AIUMB is defunct organization and apart from issuing press releases, it official website does not have any significant activity since several years. Its silence on relevant issues of Muslims of India and lip service without any activity against mob lynching's, illegal house demolition, NRC CAA and Waqf amendment Bill 2024 are seen with skeptical eyes. It has not organized any significant Conference on its past agenda since 2021 and also no annual meet has been organized since 9 February 2022.

This Board is also active in securing workable reservation for Muslims in education and employment in proportion to their population. For this they have been organizing meetings in U.P, Rajasthan, Gujrat, Delhi, Bihar, West Bengal, Jharkhand, Chattisgadh, Jammu and Kashmir, and other states besides huge Sunni Sufi conferences and Muslim Maha Panchayets. Sunni conference (Muradabad 3 January 2011), Bhagalpur (10 May 2010) and Muslim Maha Panchayet at Pakbara Muradabad (16 October 2011) and also Mashaikh e tareeqat conference of Bareilly (26 November 2011), World Sufi Forum (16-20 March 2016), Sufi Conference at West Bengal (February 2019), Sufi Conference at Kashmir (September 2021) are some of the examples.

== National Executive Body ==
AIUMB Protest against caricatures of the Muslim prophet Muhammad in the city of Sambhal, U.P, India.

S.N.	Name	Post
1	Syed Mohammad Ashraf Kichchowchhvi	Founder & National President
2	Syed Tanveer Hashmi	Vice President
3	Shah Ammar Ahmad Ahmadi (Nayyar Miyan)	Vice President
4	Syedul Anwar Sayyadi Miyan	Vice President
5	Syed Aale Mustafa Ali Pasha Quadri	Vice President
6	Shah Mohammad Hasan Jamee	National Secretary
7	Syed Fareed Ahmad Nizami	Executive Member
8	Syed Alamgir Ashraf	Executive Member
9	Syed Naseeruddin Chishty	Executive Member
10	Munawwar Jamal	Executive Member
11	Prof. Khwaja Mohd Ekramuddin	Chairman-Advisory Board
12	Mohammad Hussain Sherani	Office Secretary
13	Mohammad Ashraf	Treasurer
All India Units & Volunteers

== World Sufi Forum ==
All India Ulema and Mashaikh Board organised World Sufi forum in New Delhi from 17 to 20 March 2016. It was a gathering of 200 delegates from all around the world who were to denounce the terrorism and extremism. Famous Muslim Sufi scholar Shaykh ul Islam Dr. Muhammad Tahir-ul-Qadri delivered a keynote speech on 20 March 2016 in Ramlila Ground New Delhi, where he condemned terrorism and suicide bombings.

== See also ==
- Karwan-I-Islami
