= Shah Sultan Rumi =

11th-century Sufi saint

Shah Sultan Qamar ad-Din Rumi
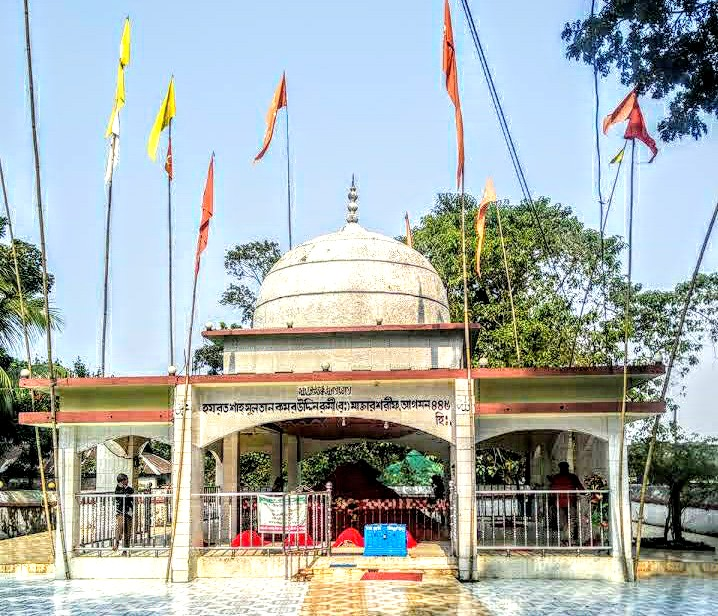
- Shrine of Shah Sultan Rumi in Madanpur

Personal life
- Died: 1075 CE Madanpur, Netrokona
- Other name: Kamaruddin

Religious life
- Religion: Sunni Islam

Senior posting
- Period in office: Early 11th century

Shāh Sulṭān Qamar ad-Dīn Rumī (Bengali: শাহ সুলতান কমর উদ্দিন রুমী, Arabic: شاه سلطان قمر الدين رومي), was an 11th-century Sufi Muslim figure who in scholarly tradition, is believed to have been the first Sufi who visited and settled in Bengal. His name is associated with the spread of Islam into Netrokona, part of a long history of travel between the Middle East, Central Asia and South Asia.

== Biography ==
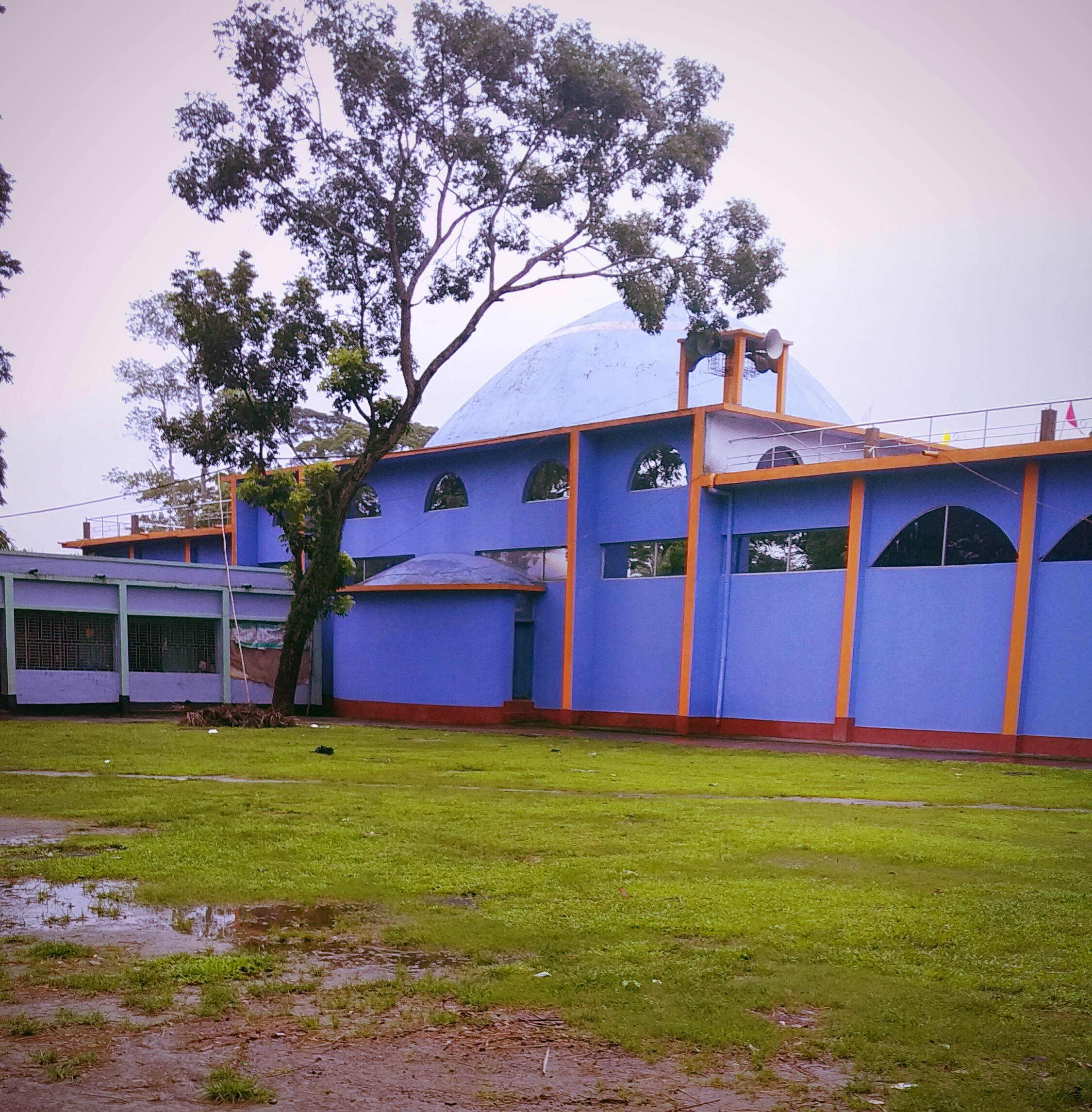
The Shah Sultan Jame Mosque in Madanpur, adjacent to his shrine.

Earlier documents reveal that Rumi arrived in Bengal in 1053 CE (445 Hijri) with his teacher Syed Shah Surkhul Antia and ten disciples. This was a century before the arrival of Muslim general Bakhtiyar Khalji and 250 years before Shah Jalal's Conquest of Sylhet in 1303 CE. Thus, Rumi arrived in Bengal even before the conquests.

Rumi and his comrades settled in modern-day Netrokona, an area with no Muslim population and ruled by a Koch king called Ganesh. The message of Islam reached the local residents, many of whom accepted Islam. When news of conversions reached the king, Rumi was summoned to the royal court. It is said that Rumi claimed that God granted him the spiritual power, and so he was faced with an ordeal. Poison was offered to him and, as is believed, he was safe and sound even after drinking the poison. All present at the scene accepted Islam and the king granted him the village of Madanpur as well as some neighbouring villages, and made it a rent-free area.

== Death and legacy ==
It is assumed that Shah Sultan Rumi died in 1075 CE (475 Hijri). A shrine was built in the village of Madanpur which continues to be visited. A mosque was built adjacent to the shrine complex.

During the colonial period of Bengal, the British East India Company tried to take over the shrine estate in 1829. This was contested by the guardians of the shrine who provided an old Persian document from 1082 CE. In response, the government abandoned the plan and granted the estate to the document holder; Syed Jalaluddin.

There are number of things named after Rumi:

- Shah Sultan Jame Mosque, Madanpur
- Shah Sultan Degree College
- Shah Sultan High School, Madanpur
- Shah Sultan Digital Institute
- Shah Sultan Diagnostic Center

== See also ==
- Shaikh Jalaluddin Tabrizi
