= Chaudhry Ashraf Deona =

Pakistani politician

Member of the Provincial Assembly of the Punjab
- In office 29 May 2013 – 31 May 2018

Personal details
- Born: 6 May 1946 (age 80) Gujrat District

Chaudhry Muhammad Ashraf Deona is a Pakistani politician who was a Member of the Provincial Assembly of the Punjab, from May 2013 to May 2018.

== Early life and education ==
He was born on 6 May 1946 in Gujrat District.

He graduated in 2009 from University of the Punjab and has a degree of Bachelor of Arts.

== Political career ==
He was elected to the Provincial Assembly of the Punjab as a candidate of Pakistan Muslim League (N) (PML-N) from Constituency PP-112 (Gujrat-V) in the 2013 Pakistani general election.

In May 2018, he quit PML-N and joined Pakistan Tehreek-e-Insaf (PTI).
