= Afsar Maudoodi =

20th-century Indian poet and physician

Personal life
- Born: 3 March 1874
- Died: 24 December 1948 (aged 74)
- Region: India
- Main interest(s): Urdu poetry, Yunani medicine
- Occupation: Physician

Religious life
- Religion: Islam

Mahmood Hussain Afsar Maudoodi (1874–1948) was an Urdu poet and a physician of Yunani medicine. He was the son of Ahmad Hussain Fida, who was a pupil of Mirza Ghalib.
