= Muhammad Ashraf (translator) =

Pakistani translator

Muhammad Ashraf is a publisher and distributor of Sunni Islamic literature based in Lahore, Pakistan.

== Specialization ==
Ashraf publishes solely Sunni Islamic religious work and was associated with the Darul Uloom Deoband madrasah and the movement that arose there, the Deobandi.

== Translations ==
Ashraf was the original publisher of the Abdullah Yusuf Ali translation of the Koran, The Holy Qur'an: Text, Translation and Commentary, famous for its copious missionary and apologetic footnotes (over 1200 pages), which for a long time has been used among English-speaking Muslims. An edited version of this Yusuf Ali translation was also subsidised for a brief period by the Saudi government.
