= Jalaluddin Tabrizi =

Sufi saint of Bengal

Makhdum Shaykh Jalāluddīn Tabrīzī
- أبو القاسم جلال الدین تبریزی
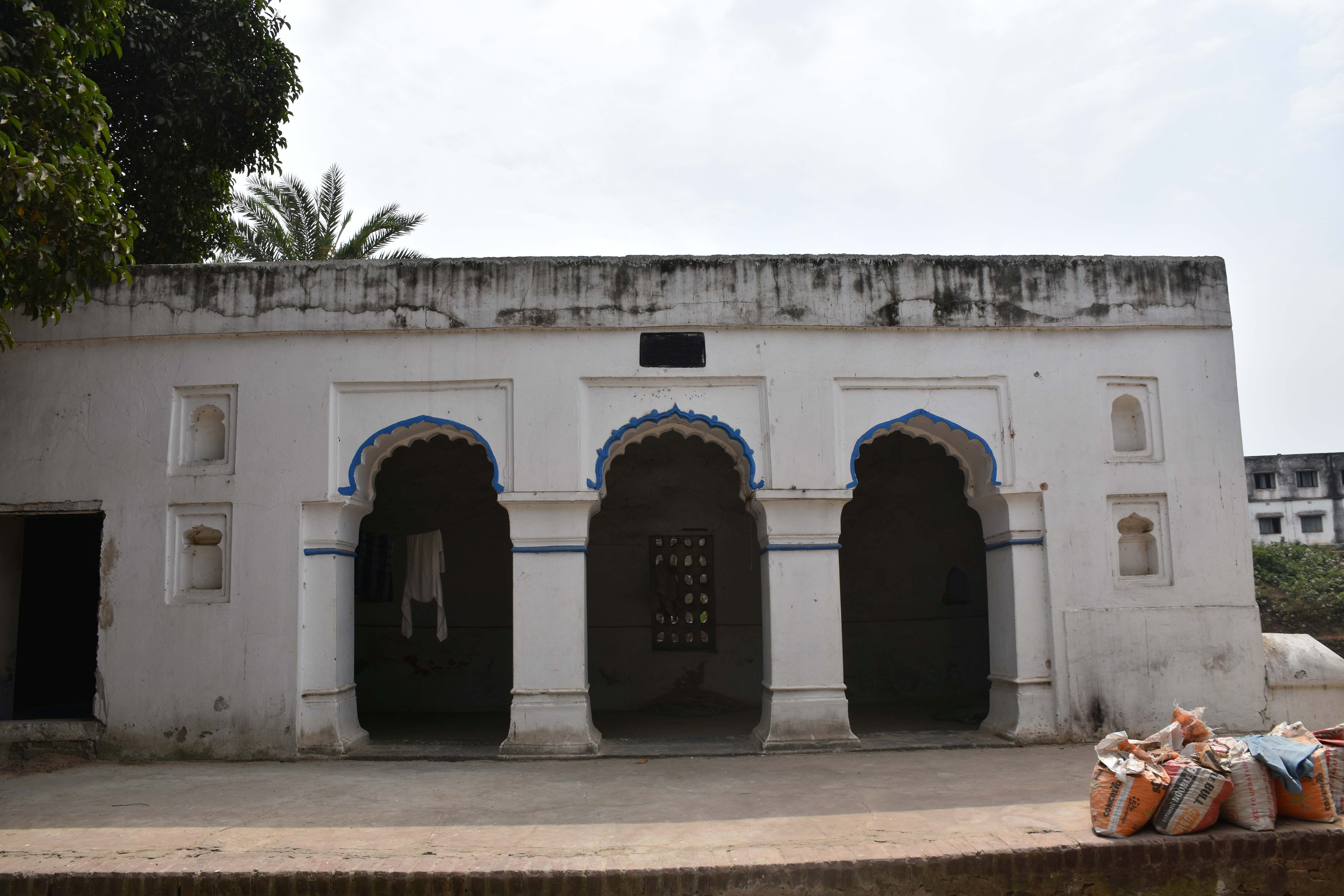
- Baish Hazari Dargah contains Tabrizi's tomb

Personal life
- Born: 12th-century Tabriz
- Died: 13th-century Hazrat Pandua, Bengal
- Resting place: Baish Hazari Dargah, Pandua, Malda district, West Bengal
- Other name: Jalal Uddin Tabrezi

Religious life
- Religion: Islam
- Denomination: Sunni
- Order: Suhrawardiyya
- School: Hanafi

Muslim leader
- Teacher: Abu Sayyid Tabrizi; Shahab al-Din Suhrawardi
- Period in office: 13th century

Abū al-Qāsim Jalāl ad-Dīn Tabrīzī (Persian: أبو القاسم جلال الدین تبریزی) was a celebrated Sufi saint of South Asia. He arrived in Bengal shortly after the start of its Muslim rule, where he propagated Islam to the local populace and spent the rest of his life. The Jaliliyyah Order, a small tariqah, is named after him, and he is considered to be the protagonist of the Sanskrit fiction Sekhaśubhodayā (Advent of the Shaykh).

== Early life and education ==
Abul Qasim Jalaluddin was born in Tabriz, in northwestern Iran. He studied under Abu Sayyid Tabrizi, a local Sunni scholar. After the death of this teacher, Jalaluddin Tabrizi became a disciple of Shahab al-Din Suhrawardi. Under Suhrawardi's service, Tabrizi frequently accompanied him during Hajj to Mecca and would carry a stove atop his head to keep food warm.

== Later life ==
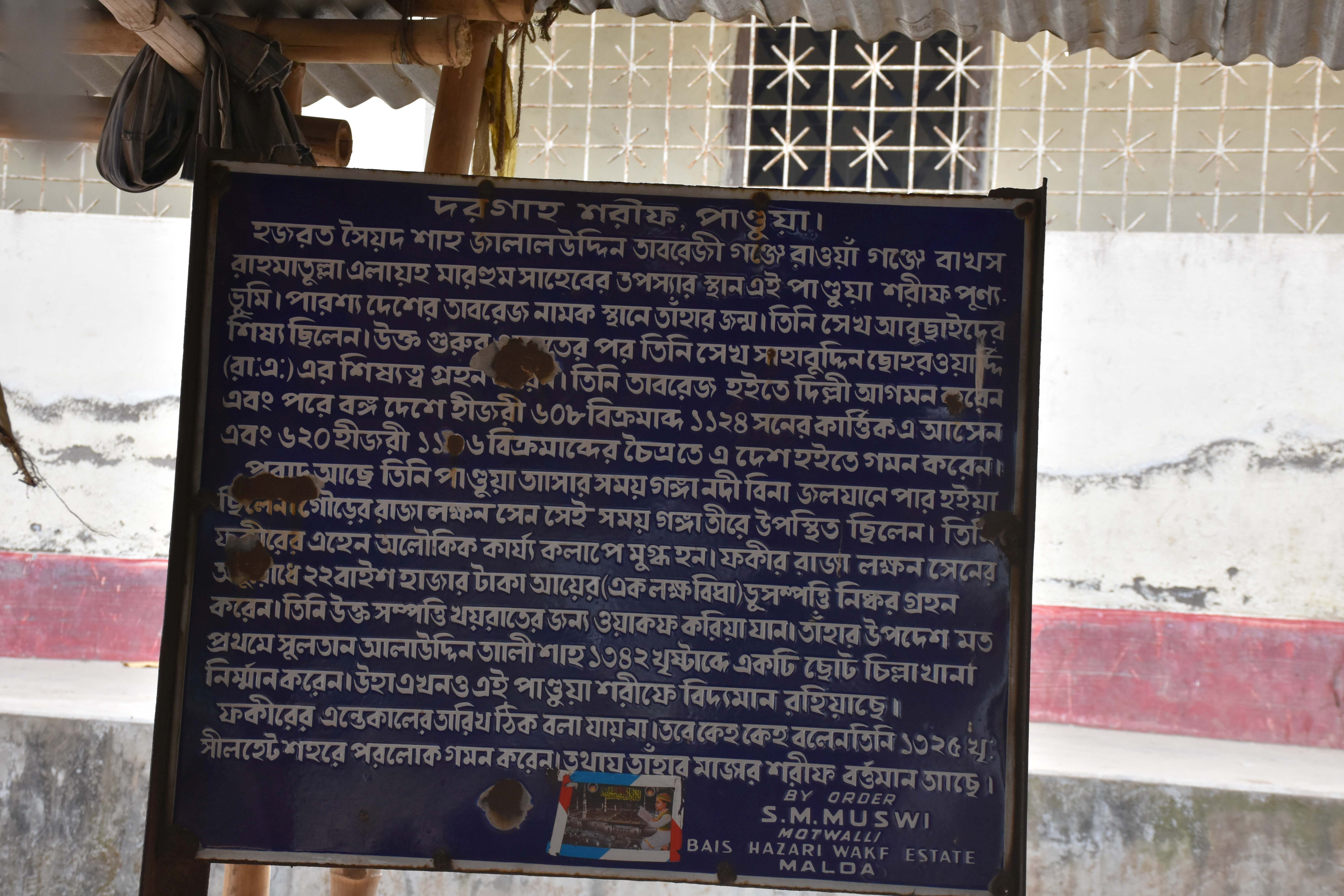
Signboard at the Baish Hazari Dargah

Tabrizi migrated to Delhi during the reign of Mamluk emperor Iltutmish in circa 1210, and was given a place to stay near the palace. His popularity was said to have annoyed Shaykh al-Islam Nizamuddin Sughra, who allegedly accused him of adultery with an infamous woman. However, other scholars like Qutbuddin Bakhtiar Kaki and Bahauddin Zakariya maintained good relations with Tabrizi. The accusations were later proved to be false.

He then proceeded to Bengal, which had recently been conquered by Muhammad Bakhtiyar Khilji. Among his numerous contributions, Tabrizi is credited for inviting many locals to Islam and amass a large following. The nearby town of Deotala was named as Tabrizabad in his honour, which suggests that he lived there for some time too.

== Death and legacy ==
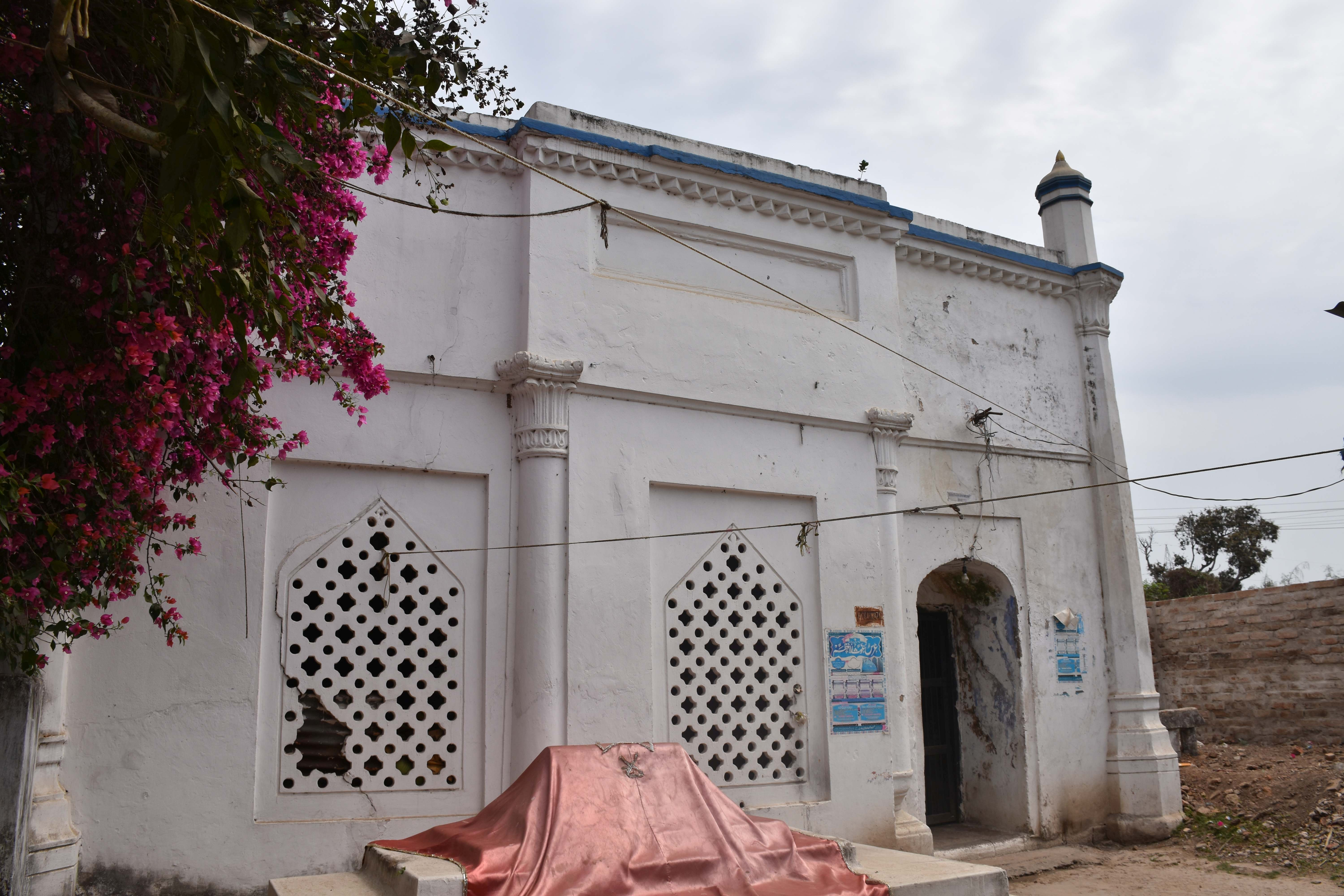
View of the Baish Hazari Dargah

The date of death of Jalaluddin Tabrizi is contested. Ghulam Sarwar asserts that he died in 1244, whilst Mirza Muhammad Akhtar Dehlavi records his death to be in 1225. Tabrizi was buried in his khanqah at Hazrat Pandua. The income of the donated land of the dargah was worth twenty-two thousand takas, and hence came to be known as the Baish Hazari Dargah.

However, Abu'l-Fazl ibn Mubarak claims that Tabrizi died in a place called Devmahal. Historians have struggled to locate such as a place as there is no place called Devmahal in Bengal. Colonial-era studies identify Devmahal with the Maldives.

The influence of Tabrizi to Muslim Bengal in the 13th-century can be seen from the succeeding centuries with confusions arising due to other Sufi saints with the common name Jalal. The 14th-century Moroccan traveller Ibn Battuta mentions his encounter with a Jalaluddin Tabrizi near Kamarupa although modern historians consider Ibn Battuta to have confused the former with Shah Jalal of Sylhet, due to an abundance of supporting inscriptions and evidences suggesting otherwise. Ibn Battuta wrote his book when he returned to Morocco, many years after travelling to these places.

During the reign of Mughal emperor Shah Alam II, Munshi Syed Sadruddin (d. 1796) was appointed as the mutawalli (guardian) of the Baish Hazari pargana. Sadruddin also built a library near his madrasa in Bohar which he gave the name Madrasa-i-Jalalia, in honour of the saint. The madrasa successively produced hundreds of ulama including Ghulam Mustafa Burdwani, Izharul Haque, Abdur Rab Lucknowi, Abdur Rahman Lucknowi and Nurul Haque Ansari.

== See also ==
- Shah Sultan Rumi
