= Ashraf Jahangir Semnani =

Indian Sufi saint

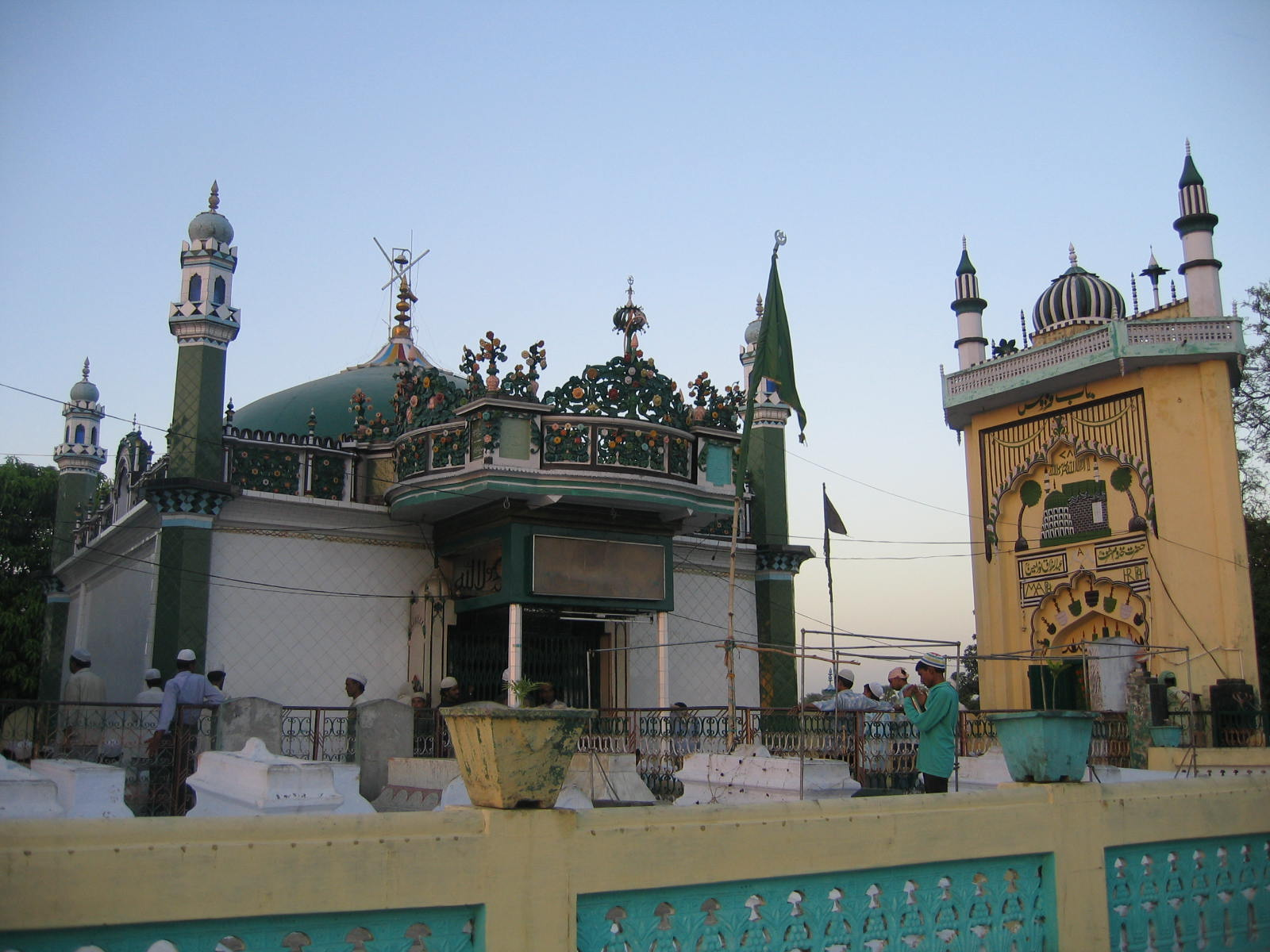
- Title: Jahangir; Mehboobe-Yazdani; Qudwatul Kubra; Sultan; Ashraf Jahangir; Makhdoom-e-Simnani

Personal life
- Born: 1289 CE (688 AH) Semnan (in modern Iran)
- Died: 1425 CE (28 Muharram 808 AH) Kichhauchha, India

Religious life
- Religion: Islam

Muslim leader
- Based in: Kichaucha, Northern India
- Period in office: Late 12th century to 13th century
- Predecessor: Alaul Haq Pandavi
- Successor: Abdur-Razzaq Nurul-Ain

Makhdoom Ashraf Jahangir Semnani (Urdu: سلطان سید مخدوم اشرف جہانگیر سمنانی) (1285–1386) was an Iranian Sufi saint from Semnan, Iran. He was the founder of the Ashrafi Sufi order. He is India's third most influential Sufi saint after Khwaja Moinuddin Chishti of Ajmer and Nizamuddin Auliya of Delhi.

His father Sultan Ibrahim Noorbaksh was the local ruler of Semnan.

== Early life ==
After his father's death, Semnani then aged 17, became the ruler of Semnan. He was said to be inclined towards mysticism. He enjoyed the company of Ruknuddin Ala ul Daula Semnani.

At the age of 23, Semnani abdicated his throne in favor of his brother Sultan Muhammad. Thereafter, Semnani migrated to Bengal in order to meet Alaul Haq Pandavi.

== Travels ==
After performing the obligatory pilgrimage to the Islamic Holy sites in Mecca and Medina, Semnani traveled to Gulbarga and Sarandib in South India.

== Meeting with other Sufis ==
Semnani met with various known Sufis of his time, including Shah Madar, Mir Sayyid Ali Hamdani, Hafez Shirazi, Bande Nawaz and Sultan Walad.

== Writings ==
Semnani was the author of the seminal Sufi text "Lataif-e-Ashrafi" ("Noble Subtleties"), a comprehensive encyclopedia of Sufism that explores practical and theoretical topics as well as theological, literary, and historical issues.

Written as oral discourses, the book contains two volumes.

Volume 1 explores Islamic theology, focusing on Tawheed (Divine Oneness). It includes a defense of Sama (Sufism) (music) as a spiritual tool. Volume 2 describes Sufi practices, ethics, and mystical states.

== See also ==
- Ala ud-Daula Simnani
- Alaul Haq Pandavi
- Sufi Saints of South Asia
