= Gorakhpur–Lokmanya Tilak Terminus Express (via Barhni) =

Train in India

Overview
- Service type: Express
- First service: 26 December 2016; 9 years ago
- Current operator: Northern Eastern Railway

Route
- Termini: Gorakhpur Junction (GKP); Lokmanya Tilak Terminus (LTT)
- Stops: 21
- Distance travelled: 1,746 km (1,085 mi)
- Average journey time: 34h 50m
- Service frequency: Weekly (Note: Runs one day in a week for every direction.)
- Train number: 15063/15064

On-board services
- Classes: AC 3 tier, Sleeper Class, General Unreserved
- Seating arrangements: No
- Sleeping arrangements: Yes
- Catering facilities: On-board Catering; E-catering
- Observation facilities: ICF coach
- Entertainment facilities: No
- Baggage facilities: No
- Other facilities: Below the seats

Technical
- Rolling stock: 2
- Track gauge: 1,676 mm (5 ft 6 in)
- Operating speed: 50 km/h (31 mph), including halts

The Gorakhpur–Lokmanya Tilak Terminus Express is an express train belonging to North Eastern Railway zone that runs between Gorakhpur Junction and Lokmanya Tilak Terminus in India. It is currently being operated with 15063/15064 train numbers on a weekly basis.

== Service ==
The 15063/Gorakhpur–Lokmanya Tilak Terminus Express has an average speed of 50 km/h and covers 1746 km in 34h 50m. The 15064/Lokmanya Tilak Terminus–Gorakhpur Express has an average speed of 52 km/h and covers 1746 km in 33h 25m.

== Route and halts ==
The important halts of the train are:

- Gorakhpur Junction
- Anand Nagar Junction
- Naugarh
- Shohratgarh
- Barhni
- Tulsipur
- Jharkhandi
- Balrampur
- Gonda Junction
- Barabanki Junction
- Lucknow Charbagh
- Kanpur Central
- Orai
- Jhansi Junction
- Rani Kamalapati
- Itarsi Junction
- Harda
- Khandwa Junction
- Bhusaval Junction
- Nasik Road
- Kalyan Junction
- Thane
- Lokmanya Tilak Terminus

== Coach composite ==
The train has standard ICF rakes with a max speed of 110 kmph. The train consists of 16 coaches:

- 2 AC III Tier
- 4 Sleeper Coaches
- 8 General Unreserved
- 2 Seating cum Luggage Rake

== Traction ==
Both trains are hauled by a Gonda Loco Shed-based WDM-3A diesel locomotive from Gorakhpur to Lucknow. From Lucknow, train is hauled by a Valsad Loco Shed-based WAM-4 electric locomotive uptil Kurla and vice versa.

== Rake sharing ==
The train shares its rake with 15065/15066 Gorakhpur–Panvel Express (via Barhni) and 15067/15068 Gorakhpur–Bandra Terminus Express (via Barhni).

== See also ==
- Gorakhpur Junction railway station
- Lokmanya Tilak Terminus
- Lokmanya Express
- Gorakhpur–Panvel Express (via Barhni)
- Gorakhpur–Bandra Terminus Express (via Barhni)
