= Gorakhpur–Panvel Express (via Barhni) =

Train in India

Overview
- Service type: Express
- First service: 20 December 2016; 9 years ago
- Current operator: Northern Eastern Railway

Route
- Termini: Gorakhpur Junction (GKP); Panvel (PNVL)
- Stops: 24
- Distance travelled: 1,746 km (1,085 mi)
- Average journey time: 34h 50m
- Service frequency: Four days (Note: Runs four days in a week for every direction.)
- Train number: 15065/15066

On-board services
- Classes: AC 3 tier, Sleeper class, General Unreserved
- Seating arrangements: No
- Sleeping arrangements: Yes
- Catering facilities: On-board catering E-catering
- Observation facilities: LHB coach
- Entertainment facilities: No
- Baggage facilities: No
- Other facilities: Below the seats

Technical
- Rolling stock: 2
- Track gauge: 1,676 mm (5 ft 6 in)
- Operating speed: 50 km/h (31 mph), including halts

The Gorakhpur–Panvel Express is an Express train belonging to North Eastern Railway zone that runs between Gorakhpur Junction and Panvel in India. It is currently being operated with 15065/15066 train numbers on a four days in a week basis.

== Service ==
The 15065/Gorakhpur–Panvel Express has an average speed of 50 km/h and covers 1746 km in 34h 50m. The 15066/Panvel–Gorakhpur Express has an average speed of 50 km/h and covers 1746 km in 34h 50m.

== Route and halts ==
The important halts of the train are:

- Gorakhpur Junction
- Anand Nagar Junction
- Naugarh
- Shohratgarh
- Barhni
- Tulsipur
- Jharkhandi
- Balrampur
- Gonda Junction
- Barabanki Junction
- Lucknow Charbagh
- Kanpur Central
- Orai
- Jhansi Junction
- Rani Kamalapati
- Itarsi Junction
- Harda
- Khandwa Junction
- Bhusaval Junction
- Nasik Road
- Kalyan Junction
- Panvel

== Coach composition ==
The train has LHB rakes with a max speed of 110 kmph. The train consists of 21 coaches:

- 2 AC II Tier
- 6 AC III Tier
- 7 Sleeper coaches
- 4 General Unreserved
- 2 Generator Car

== Traction ==
Both trains are hauled by a Gonda Loco Shed-based WDM-3A diesel locomotive from Gorakhpur to Gonda. From Gonda, train is hauled by a Valsad Loco Shed-based WAP-7 electric locomotive up till Panvel and vice versa.

== Rake sharing ==
The train shares its rake with 15063/15064 Gorakhpur–Lokmanya Tilak Terminus Express (via Barhni) and 15067/15068 Gorakhpur–Bandra Terminus Express (via Barhni)

== See also ==
- Gorakhpur Junction railway station
- Panvel railway station
- Lokmanya Express
- Gorakhpur–Lokmanya Tilak Terminus Express (via Barhni)
- Gorakhpur–Bandra Terminus Express (via Barhni)
