= Kushinagar Superfast Express =

Train in India

Overview
- Service type: Superfast
- Locale: Maharashtra, Madhya Pradesh & Uttar Pradesh
- First service: 1 May 1972; 53 years ago
- Current operator: North Eastern Railway

Route
- Termini: Mumbai LTT (LTT); Gorakhpur (GKP)
- Stops: 43
- Distance travelled: 1,680 km (1,044 mi)
- Average journey time: 30 hours 25 minutes
- Service frequency: Daily
- Train number: 22537 / 22538

On-board services
- Classes: AC first, AC 2 tier, AC 3 tier, Sleeper class, General Unreserved
- Seating arrangements: Yes
- Sleeping arrangements: Yes
- Catering facilities: Available
- Observation facilities: Large windows
- Baggage facilities: Available

Technical
- Rolling stock: LHB coach
- Track gauge: 1,676 mm (5 ft 6 in)
- Operating speed: 55 km/h (34 mph) average with halts.
Route map
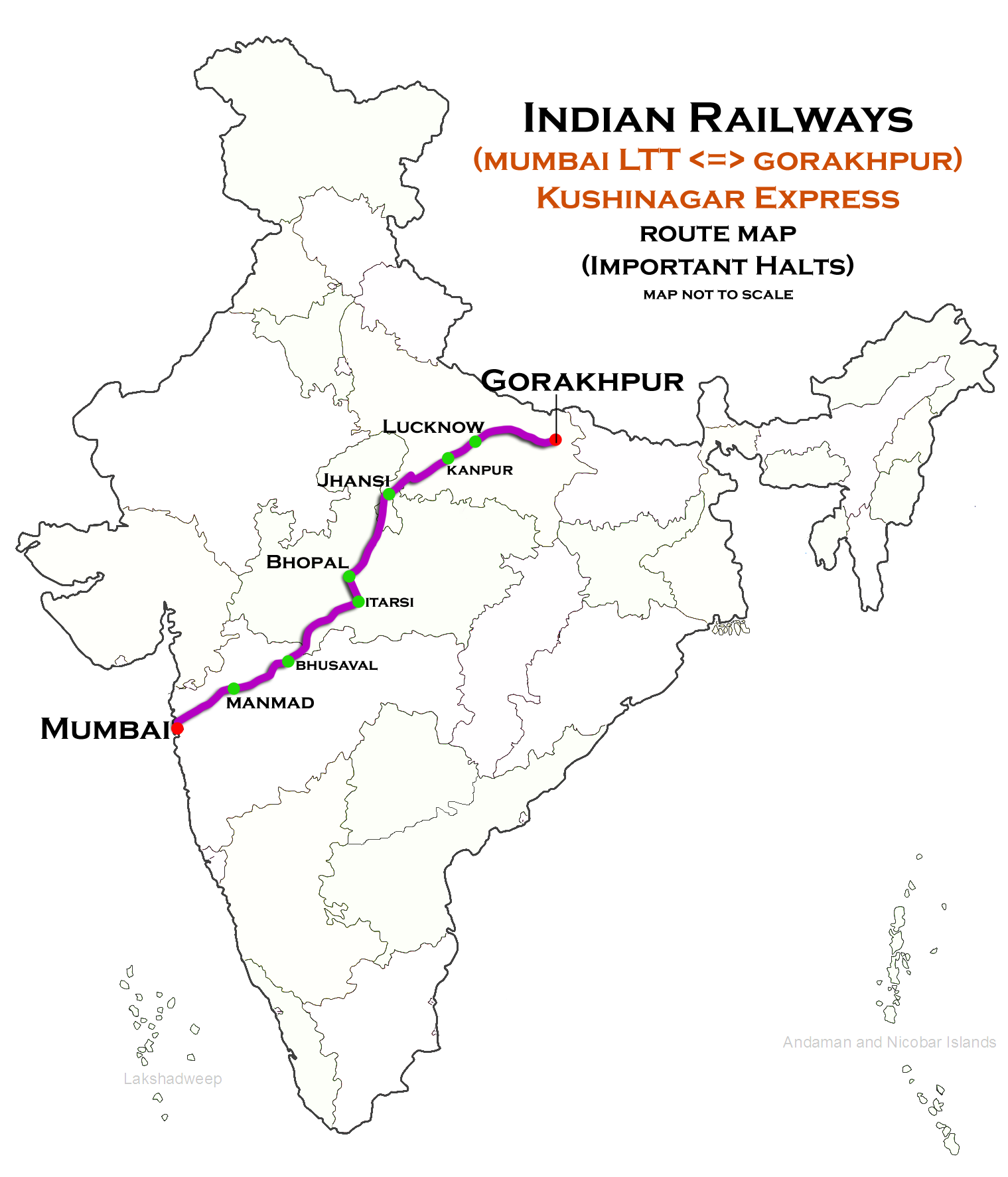

The 22537 / 22538 Kushinagar Superfast Express is an Indian Railways train running between Lokmanya Tilak Terminus (Mumbai) and Gorakhpur. It is numbered as 22538/22537. The train is named after the town of Kushinagar, an important Buddhist pilgrim centre near Gorakhpur.

The train takes nearly 30 hours to complete the distance of 1693 km.

== Route & halts ==
- Lokmanya Tilak Terminus
- Thane
- Nasik Road
- Manmad Junction
- Chalisgaon Junction
- Jalgaon Junction
- Bhusaval Junction
- Burhanpur
- Khandwa
- Harda
- Itarsi Junction
- Rani Kamalapati
- Bhopal Junction
- Vidisha
- Bina Junction
- Lalitpur Junction
- Babina
- Virangana Laxmibai
- Ait
- Orai
- Pokhrayan
- Kanpur Central
- Unnao Junction
- Lucknow Aishbagh
- Gonda Junction
- Mankapur Junction
- Maskanwa
- Babhnan
- Basti
- Khalilabad
- Gorakhpur Junction.

== Traction ==
It is hauled by a Kalyan Loco Shed-based WAP-7 electric locomotive on its entire journey.

== Coach composition ==
The 22538/22537 Kushinagar Express presently has 1 AC First Class, 3 AC 2 tier, 9 AC 3 tier, 4 Sleeper Class, 2 General Unreserved coaches, 1 EOG, 1 AC pantry car & 1 SLR coach.

Loco	1	2	3	4	5	6	7	8	9	10	11	12	13	14	15	16	17	18	19	20	21	22
	SLR	GS	GS	S4	S3	S2	S1	PC	B9	B8	B7	B6	B5	B4	B3	B2	B1	H1	A3	A2	A1	EOG

As with most train services in India, coach composition may be amended at the discretion of Indian Railways depending on demand.

== See also ==
- Indian Railways
