= Bandra Terminus–Gorakhpur Antyodaya Express =

Indian express train route

Mumbai Bandra Terminus – Gorakhpur Junction Antyodaya Express

Overview
- Service type: Antyodaya Express
- First service: 13 August 2017; 8 years ago
- Current operator: Western Railways

Route
- Termini: Bandra Terminus (BDTS); Gorakhpur Junction (GKP)
- Stops: 18
- Distance travelled: 2,026 km (1,259 mi)
- Average journey time: 36h 25m
- Service frequency: Weekly (Note: Run once in a week for every direction.)
- Train number: 22921 / 22922

On-board services
- Class: Unreserved
- Seating arrangements: Yes
- Sleeping arrangements: No
- Catering facilities: No
- Baggage facilities: Yes

Technical
- Rolling stock: LHB-Antyodaya
- Track gauge: 1,676 mm (5 ft 6 in)
- Operating speed: 57 km/h (35 mph)
Route map
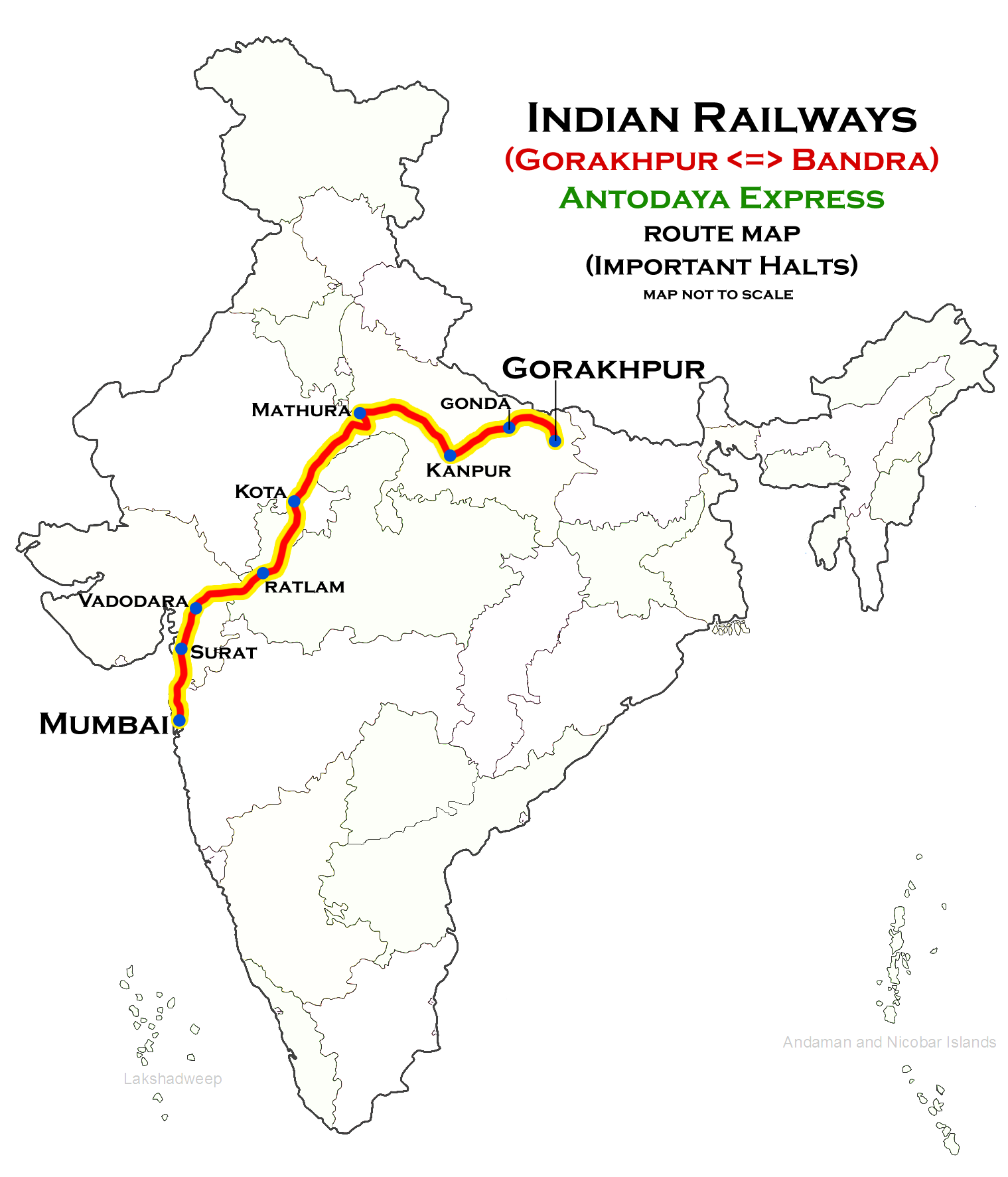

The 22921 / 22922 Bandra Terminus–Gorakhpur Antyodaya Express is an Express train belonging to Western Railway zone that runs between Bandra Terminus and Gorakhpur Junction. It is being operated with 22921/22922 train numbers on a weekly basis.

== Coach composition ==
The trains are completely general coaches trains designed by Indian Railways with features of LED screen display to show information about stations, train speed, etc. Vending machines for water, Bio toilets in compartments as well as CCTV cameras, mobile charging points and toilet occupancy indicators.

== Service ==
- 22921/Bandra Terminus–Gorakhpur Antyodaya Express has an average speed of 56 km/h and covers 2026 km in 36 hrs 25 mins.
- 22922/Gorakhpur–Bandra Terminus Antyodaya Express has an average speed of 55 km/h and covers 2026 km in 36 hrs 50 mins.

== Route & halts ==
- Bandra Terminus
- Borivali
- Vapi
- Surat
- Vadodara Junction
- Ratlam Junction
- Nagda Junction
- Kota Junction
- Bharatpur Junction
- Achhnera Junction
- Mathura Junction
- Kasganj Junction
- Farrukhabad Junction
- Kanpur Central
- Lucknow Charbagh
- Gonda Junction
- Balrampur
- Tulsipur
- Naugarh
- Anand Nagar Junction
- Gorakhpur Junction
- Train No. 22922 has a scheduled halt at Valsad

== Schedule ==
Train number	Station code	Departure station	Departure time	Departure day	Arrival station	Arrival time	Arrival day
22921	BDTS	Bandra Terminus	05:10 AM	Sun	Gorakhpur Junction	17:35 PM	Mon
22922	GKP	Gorakhpur Junction	03:25 AM	Tue	Bandra Terminus	16:15 PM	Wed

== Traction ==
Both trains are hauled by a Vadodara Loco Shed-based WAP-7 electric locomotives from Bandra to Gorakhpur and vice versa.

== Direction reversal ==
Train reverses its direction one time:

- Achhnera Junction

== See also ==
- Antyodaya Express
- Bandra Terminus
- Gorakhpur Junction railway station
