= Anandwan Express =

Train in India

Overview
- Service type: Superfast
- First service: 11 January 2016; 10 years ago
- Current operator: Central Railway

Route
- Termini: Mumbai LTT (LTT); Kazipet Junction (KZJ)
- Stops: 19
- Distance travelled: 1,105 km (687 mi)
- Average journey time: 19 hours 15 minutes
- Service frequency: Weekly
- Train number: 22127 / 22128

On-board services
- Classes: AC 2 Tier, AC 3 Tier, sleeper Class, general unreserved
- Seating arrangements: Yes
- Sleeping arrangements: Yes
- Catering facilities: On-board catering
- Observation facilities: Large windows
- Baggage facilities: No
- Other facilities: Below the seats

Technical
- Rolling stock: LHB coach
- Track gauge: 1,676 mm (5 ft 6 in)
- Operating speed: 57 km/h (35 mph) average including halts.

The 22127 / 22128 Anandwan Express is a superfast express train belonging to Indian Railways Central Zone that runs between Lokmanya Tilak Terminus and Kazipet Junction in India.

It operates as train number 22127 from Lokmanya Tilak Terminus to Kazipet Junction and as train number 22128 in the reverse direction, serving the states of Maharashtra and Telangana.

== Coaches ==
The 22127 / 28 Anandwan Express has 1 AC 2-tier, 4 AC 3-tier, 12 sleeper class, 3 general unreserved and two SLR (seating with luggage rake) coaches . It does not carry a pantry car.

As is customary with most train services in India, coach composition may be amended at the discretion of Indian Railways depending on demand.

== Service ==
The 22127 Lokmanya Tilak Terminus–Kazipet Junction Anandwan Express covers the distance of 1,105 km (687 mi) in 19 hours 15 mins (57 km/h) and in 19 hours 15 mins as the 22128 Kazipet Junction–Lokmanya Tilak Terminus Anandwan Express (57 km/h).

As the average speed of the train is more than 55 km/h (34 mph), as per railway rules, its fare includes a Superfast surcharge.

== Schedule ==
Train number	Station code	Departure station	Departure time	Departure day	Arrival station	Arrival time	Arrival day
22127	LTT	Lokmanya Tilak Terminus	11:30 AM	Monday	Kazipet Junction	6:45 AM	Tuesday
22128	KZJ	Kazipet Junction	6:30 PM	Tuesday	Lokmanya Tilak Terminus	1:45 PM	Wednesday

== Rake sharing ==
11079/11080 – Gorakhpur Junction to Lokmanya Tilak Terminus, Lokmanya Express

== Routing ==
The 22127 / 28 Anandwan Express runs from Lokmanya Tilak Terminus via Kalyan Junction, Bhusaval Junction, Akola Junction, Badnera Junction, Wardha Junction, Chandrapur, Balharshah Junction, Ramagundam to Kazipet Junction.

== Traction ==
As the route is fully electrified, a Bhusaval Loco Shed-based WAP-4 or Ajni Loco Shed-based WAP-7 electric locomotive pulls the train to its destination.
