= Jharkhandi railway station =

Railway station in Uttar Pradesh

Jharkhandi
- Indian Railways Logo

General information
- Location: Jharkhandi, Balrampur district, Uttar Pradesh; India
- Coordinates: 27°26′21″N 82°12′42″E
- System: Indian Railways station
- Owner: Indian Railways
- Operator: North Eastern Railway
- Line: Gorakhpur–Barhni line
- Platforms: 1
- Tracks: 1

Construction
- Structure type: Standard
- Parking: Yes

Other information
- Status: Functioning
- Station code: JKNI
- Zone(s): North Eastern Railway
- Division(s): Lucknow NER

History
- Electrified: Ongoing
Location
- Location within India Location within Uttar Pradesh

Jharkhandi railway station is located in Jharkhandi area of Balrampur district, Uttar Pradesh. It serves Jharkhandi area of Balrampur. Its code is JKNI. It has a single platform. Passenger, DEMU, and Express trains halt here.

== Trains ==
- Gorakhpur–Panvel Express (via Barhni)
- Lokmanya Tilak Terminus–Gorakhpur Lokmanya Express (via Barhni)
- Gorakhpur–Lokmanya Tilak Terminus Express (via Barhni)
- Gorakhpur–Sitapur Express (via Barhni)
- Gorakhpur–Bandra Terminus Express (via Barhni)
