= Gorakhpur–Lokmanya Tilak Terminus Superfast Express =

Train in India

Sant Kabir Dham Superfast Express
Overview
- Service type: Superfast
- Locale: Uttar Pradesh, Madhya Pradesh & Maharashtra
- First service: 7 February 2010; 16 years ago
- Current operator: Central Railways

Route
- Termini: Azamgarh Railway station Lokmanya Tilak Terminus (LTT)
- Stops: 15
- Distance travelled: 1,680 km (1,044 mi)
- Average journey time: 30 hours 5 minutes
- Service frequency: Daily
- Train number: 20103 / 20104

On-board services
- Classes: 2A, 3A, SL, UR/GEN
- Seating arrangements: Yes
- Sleeping arrangements: Yes
- Catering facilities: Available
- Observation facilities: Large windows
- Baggage facilities: Yes

Technical
- Rolling stock: LHB coach
- Track gauge: 1,676 mm (5 ft 6 in)
- Operating speed: 110 km/h (68 mph) average including halts

The 20103 / 20104 Gorakhpur–Lokmanya Tilak Terminus Sant Kabir Dham Superfast Express is a Superfast Express train belonging to Indian Railways that runs between Gorakhpur Junction and Lokmanya Tilak Terminus, Kurla (Mumbai) via Basti in India. It operates as train number 20104 from Gorakhpur Junction to Lokmanya Tilak Terminus and as train number 20103 in the reverse direction. Now it runs daily between LTT and Azamgarh railway station.

== Coaches ==
20103 / 20104 Gorakhpur Junction–Lokmanya Tilak Terminus Sant Kabir Dham Superfast Express presently has one AC 2 tier, four AC 3 tier, ten Sleeper class, four General Unreserved coaches and one Pantry car. As with most train services in India, coach composition may be amended at the discretion of Indian Railways depending on demand.

== Service ==
20104 Gorakhpur Junction – Lokmanya Tilak Terminus Sant Kabir Dham Superfast Express covers the distance of 1680 kilometres in 30 hours 5 mins (55.23 km/h) and 1680 kilometres in 30 hours 5 mins as 20103 Lokmanya Tilak Terminus - Gorakhpur Junction Sant Kabir Dham Superfast Express (56.10 km/h). As the average speed of the train is more than 56 km/h, its fare includes a Superfast surcharge.

It goes via Aishbagh Badshahnagar route without reversing its direction at Lucknow Jn.

During COVID19 pandemic the issue of bedrolls were temporarily discontinued.

== Route & halts ==
- Gorakhpur Junction
- Khalilabad
- Basti
- Babhnan
- Gonda Junction
- Badshahnagar
- Lucknow Aishbagh
- Kanpur Central
- Orai
- Jhansi Junction
- Bhopal Junction
- Itarsi Junction
- Khandwa Junction
- Bhusawal
- Igatpuri
- Lokmanya Tilak Terminus

== Traction ==
It is hauled by a Ajni-based WAP-7 or Kalyan-based WAP-7 locomotive in both directions.

== Gallery ==
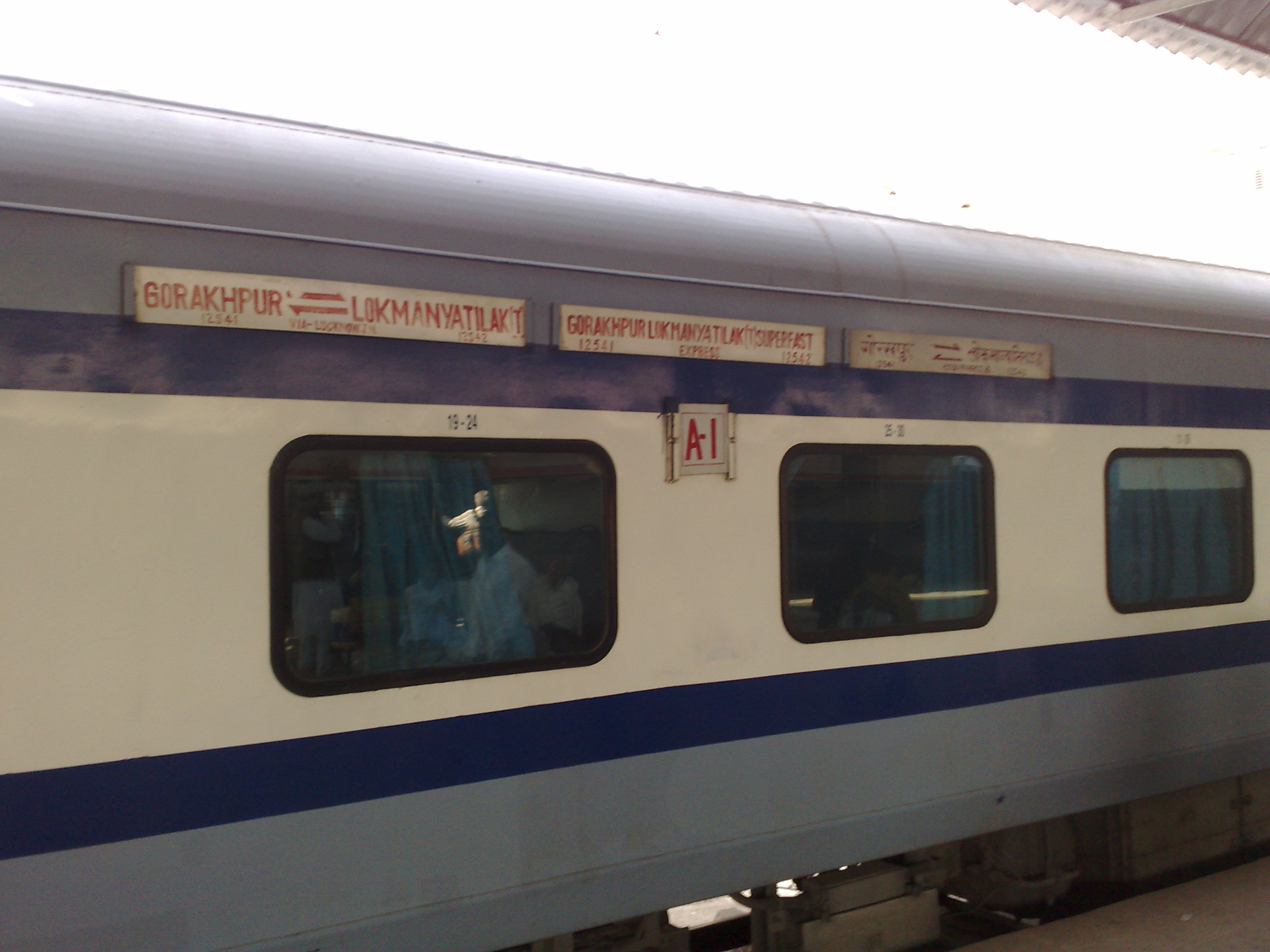
Gorakhpur Junction–Lokmanya Tilak Terminus Sant Kabir Dham Superfast Express – AC 2 tier coach

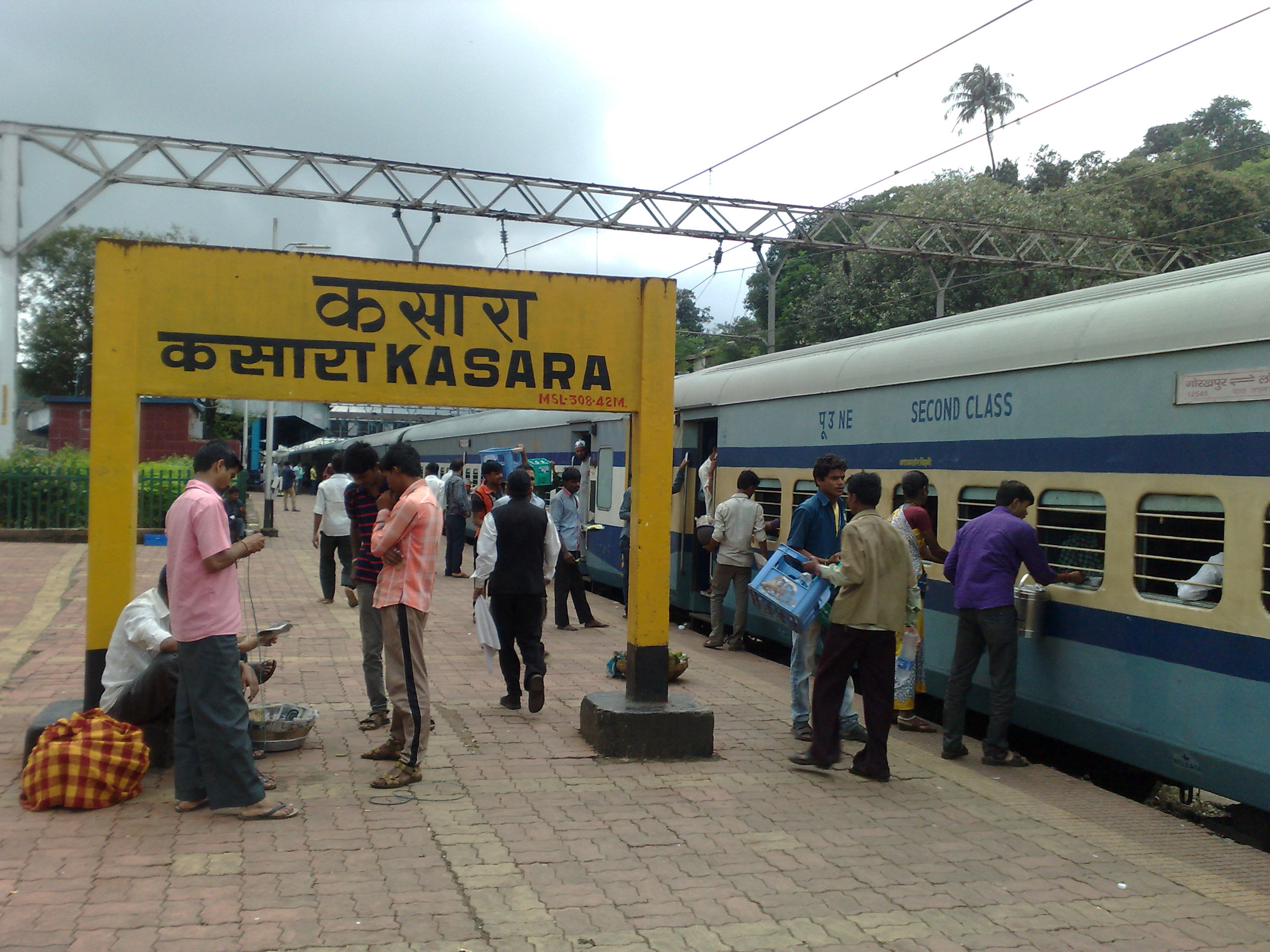
Gorakhpur Junction–Lokmanya Tilak Terminus Sant Kabir Dham Superfast Express at Kasara

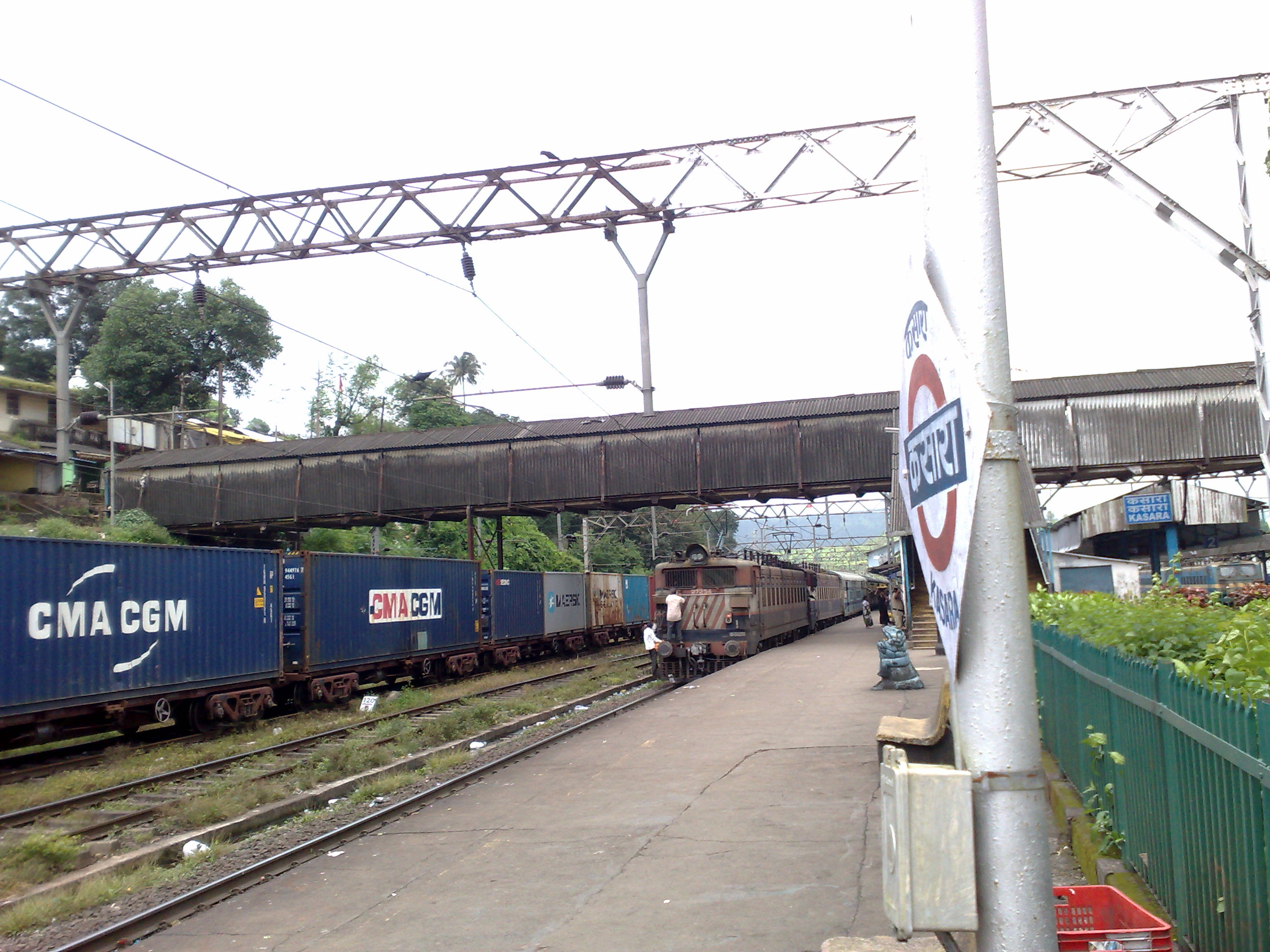
Gorakhpur Junction–Lokmanya Tilak Terminus Sant Kabir Dham Superfast Express leaving Kasara with WAG-7 bankers

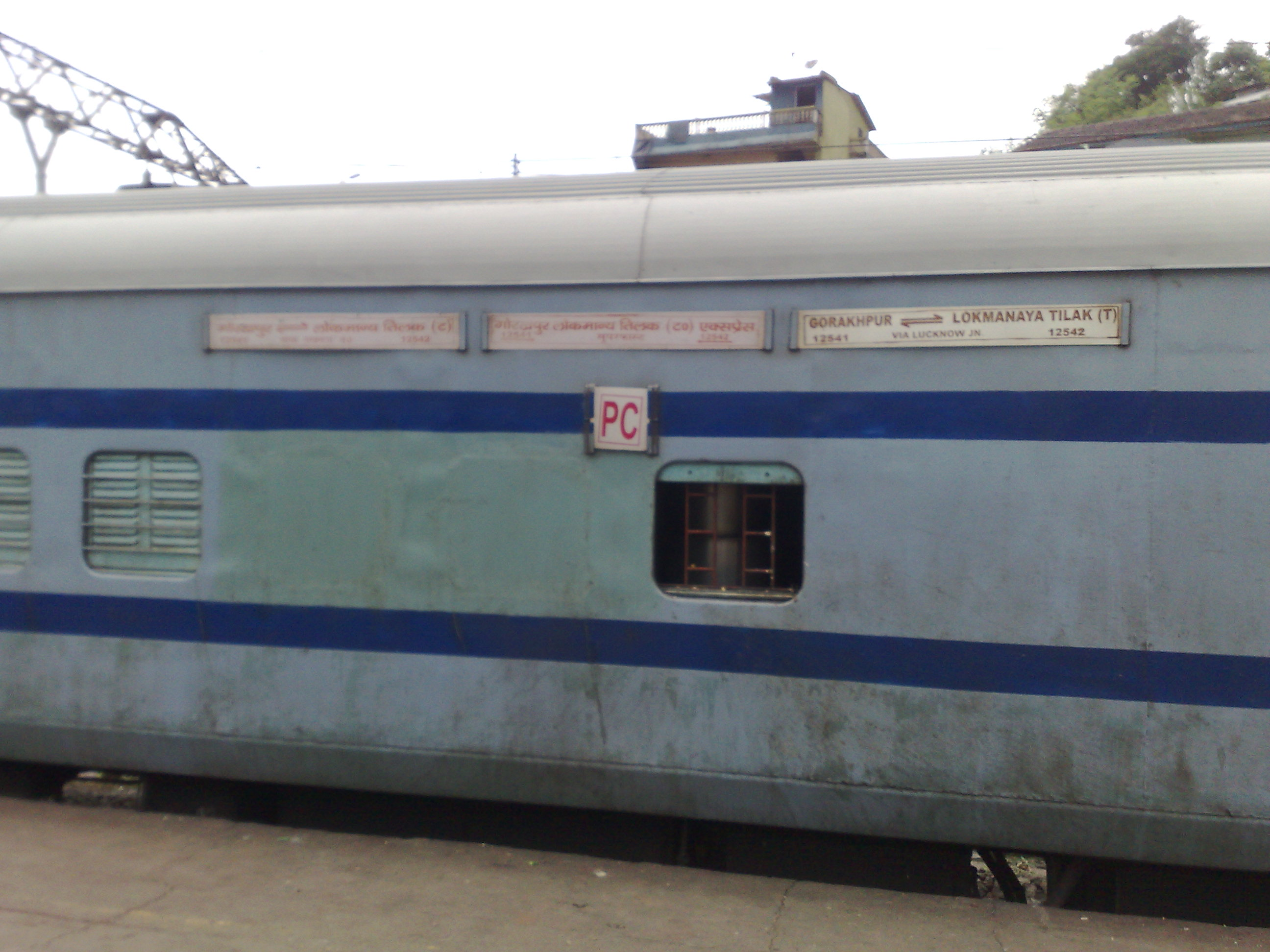
Gorakhpur Junction–Lokmanya Tilak Terminus Sant Kabir Dham Superfast Express – Pantry car coach

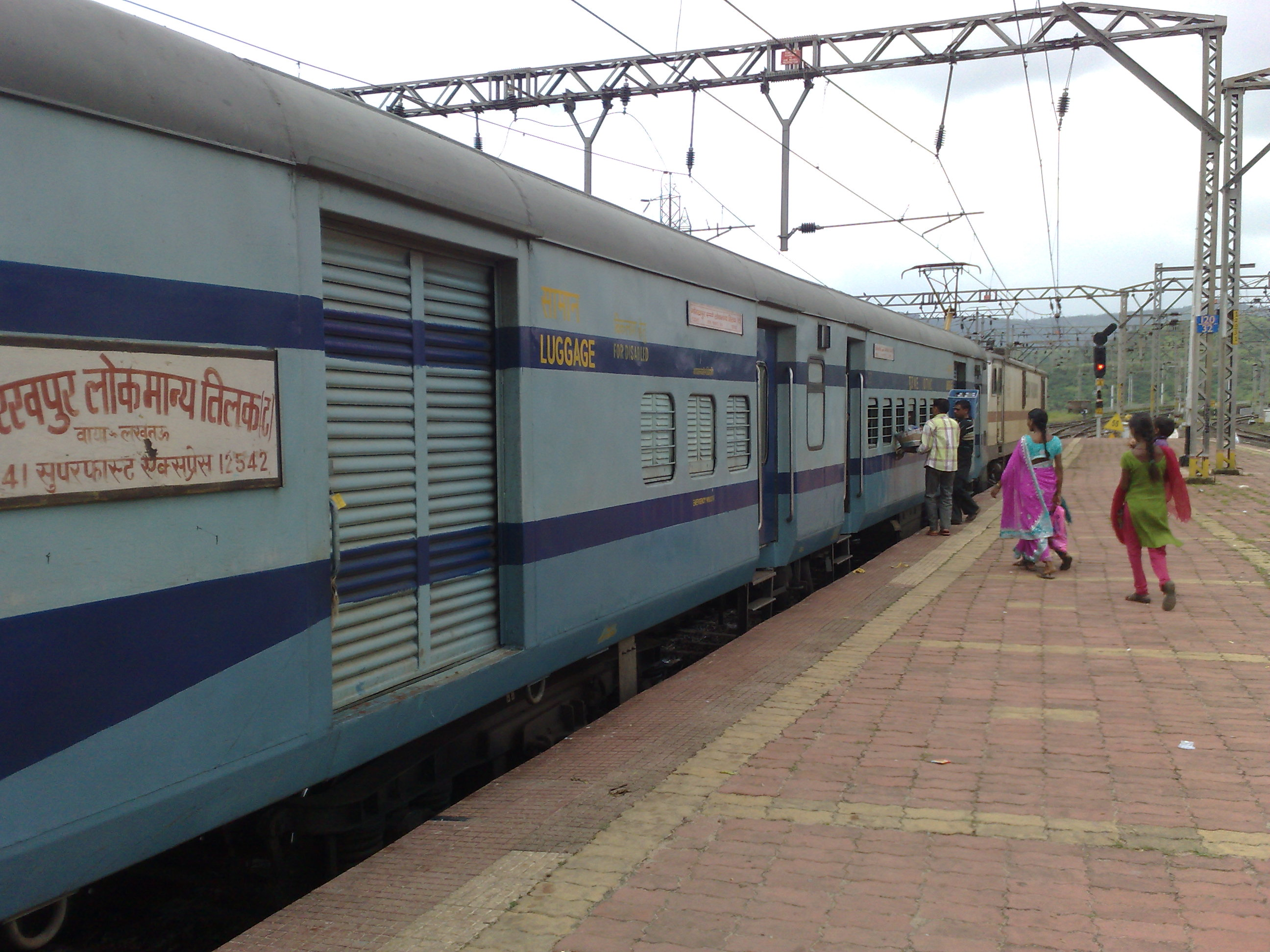
Gorakhpur Junction–Lokmanya Tilak Terminus Sant Kabir Dham Superfast Express headed by an Ajni-based WAP-7
