= Chhapra–Lokmanya Tilak Terminus Antyodaya Express =

Train in India

Chhapra–Mumbai CSMT Antyodaya Express

Overview
- Service type: Express
- Current operator: Northern Eastern Railway

Route
- Termini: Chhapra Junction; Chhatrapati Shivaji Terminus
- Stops: 17
- Distance travelled: 1,882 km (1,169 mi)
- Average journey time: 35 hours
- Service frequency: Weekly
- Train number: 15101 / 15102

On-board services
- Class: UR/GEN
- Seating arrangements: Yes
- Sleeping arrangements: Yes
- Catering facilities: No

Technical
- Rolling stock: LHB-Antyodaya
- Track gauge: 1,676 mm (5 ft 6 in)
- Operating speed: 54 km/h (34 mph)
Route map
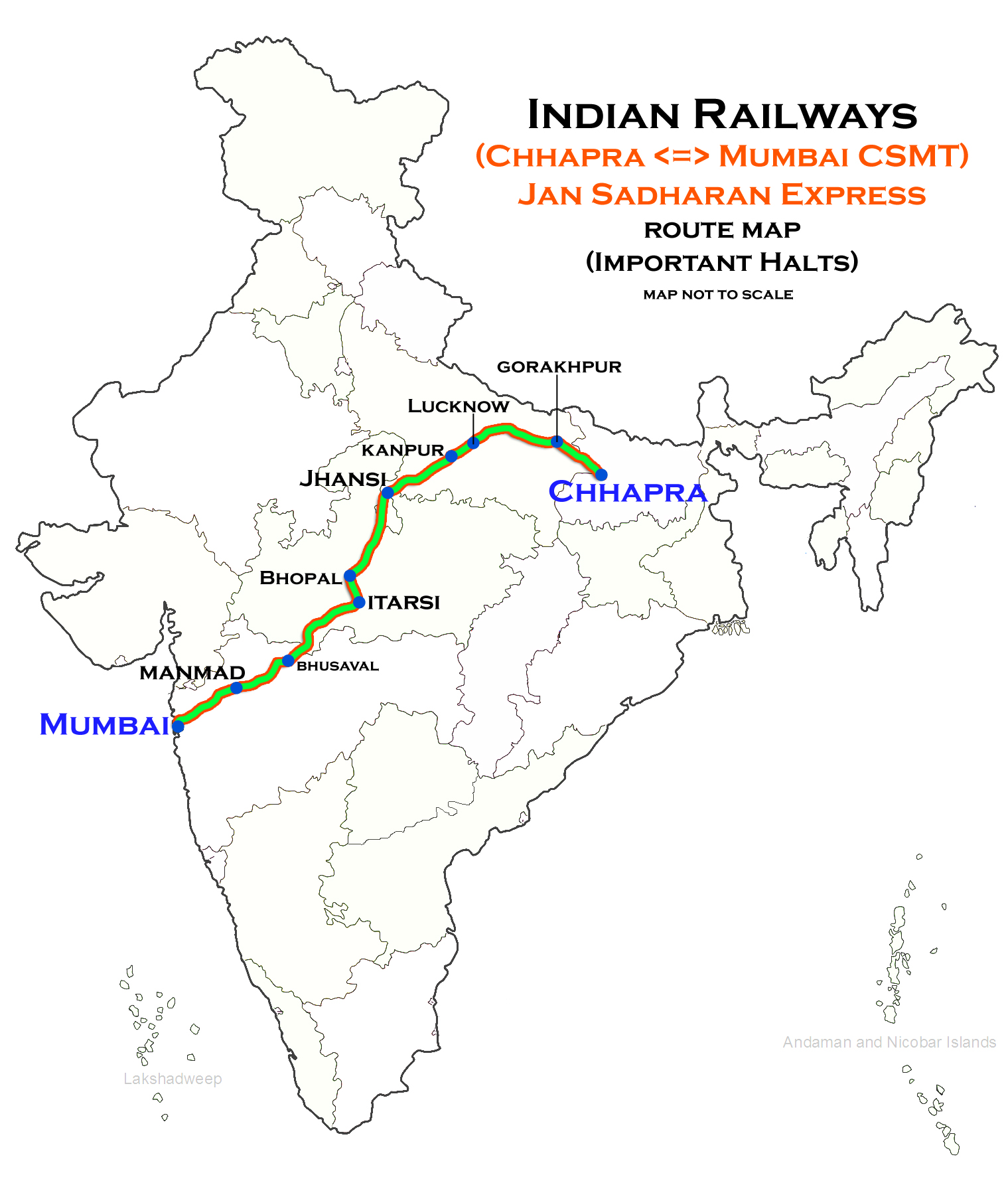

The Chhapra–Mumbai CST Antyodaya Express is a weekly Antyodaya Express, running between Chhapra Junction and Mumbai CST via Bhopal, Jhansi, Kanpur and Basti. It is numbered 15102/15101. This train is operated and maintained by North Eastern Railway zone of Indian Railways.

Till 25 April 2019, it was run as the Jan Sadharan Express with ICF Coaches and later 26 April 2019 it's upgraded to LHB coach and runs as the Antyodaya Express.

== Coaches ==
The 15101 / 02 Chhapra Junction–Mumbai CST Antyodaya Express has 23 general unreserved & two SLR (seating with luggage rake) coaches . It does not carry a pantry car.

As is customary with most train services in India, coach composition may be amended at the discretion of Indian Railways depending on demand.

== Service ==
The 15101 Chhapra Junction–Mumbai CST Antyodaya Express covers the distance of 1,882 km (1,169 mi) in 33 hours 10 mins (57 km/h) and in 37 hours 05 mins as the 15102 Mumbai CST–Chhapra Junction Antyodaya Express (51 km/h).

As the average speed of the train is lower than 55 km/h (34 mph), as per railway rules, its fare doesn't includes a Superfast surcharge.

== Routing ==
This train runs via Siwan Junction, Bhatni, Gorakhpur Junction, Basti, Ayodhya Junction, Prayagraj Junction, Kanpur Central, Orai, Jhansi Junction, Bhopal Junction, Khandwa Junction, Bhusaval Junction, Manmad Junction, Nasik Road, Kalyan Junction to reach Mumbai CST.

== Traction ==
As the route is fully electrified an electric locomotive WAP-4 pulls the train to its destination.
