= Shohratgarh railway station =

Railway station in Uttar Pradesh

Shohratgarh
- Indian Railways logo

General information
- Location: Shohratgarh, Siddharthnagar district, Uttar Pradesh; India
- Coordinates: 27°23′30″N 82°57′27″E
- Elevation: 94 metres (308 ft)
- System: Indian Railways station
- Owner: Indian Railways
- Operator: North Eastern Railway
- Line: Gorakhpur–Nautanwa–Barhni line
- Platforms: 3
- Tracks: 4

Construction
- Structure type: Standard
- Parking: Yes

Other information
- Status: Functioning
- Station code: SOT
- Zone(s): North Eastern Railway
- Division(s): Lucknow NER

History
- Electrified: Ongoing
Location
- Location within India Location within Uttar Pradesh

Shohratgarh railway station is located in Shohratgarh town of Siddharthnagar district, Uttar Pradesh. It serves Shohratgarh town. Its code is SOT. It has three platforms. Passenger, DEMU, and Express trains halt here.

== Trains ==
- Gorakhpur–Panvel Express (via Barhni)
- Gorakhpur–Lokmanya Tilak Terminus Express (via Barhni)
- Gorakhpur−Badshahnagar Intercity Express
- Gorakhpur–Sitapur Express (via Barhni)
- Gorakhpur–Bandra Terminus Express (via Barhni)
- ( nakaha jungle- Gomti nagar Express {(via shohratgarh)}
