= Gorakhpur–Thiruvananthapuram North Raptisagar Express =

Train in India

Gorakhpur – Thiruvananthapuram North Raptisagar Express
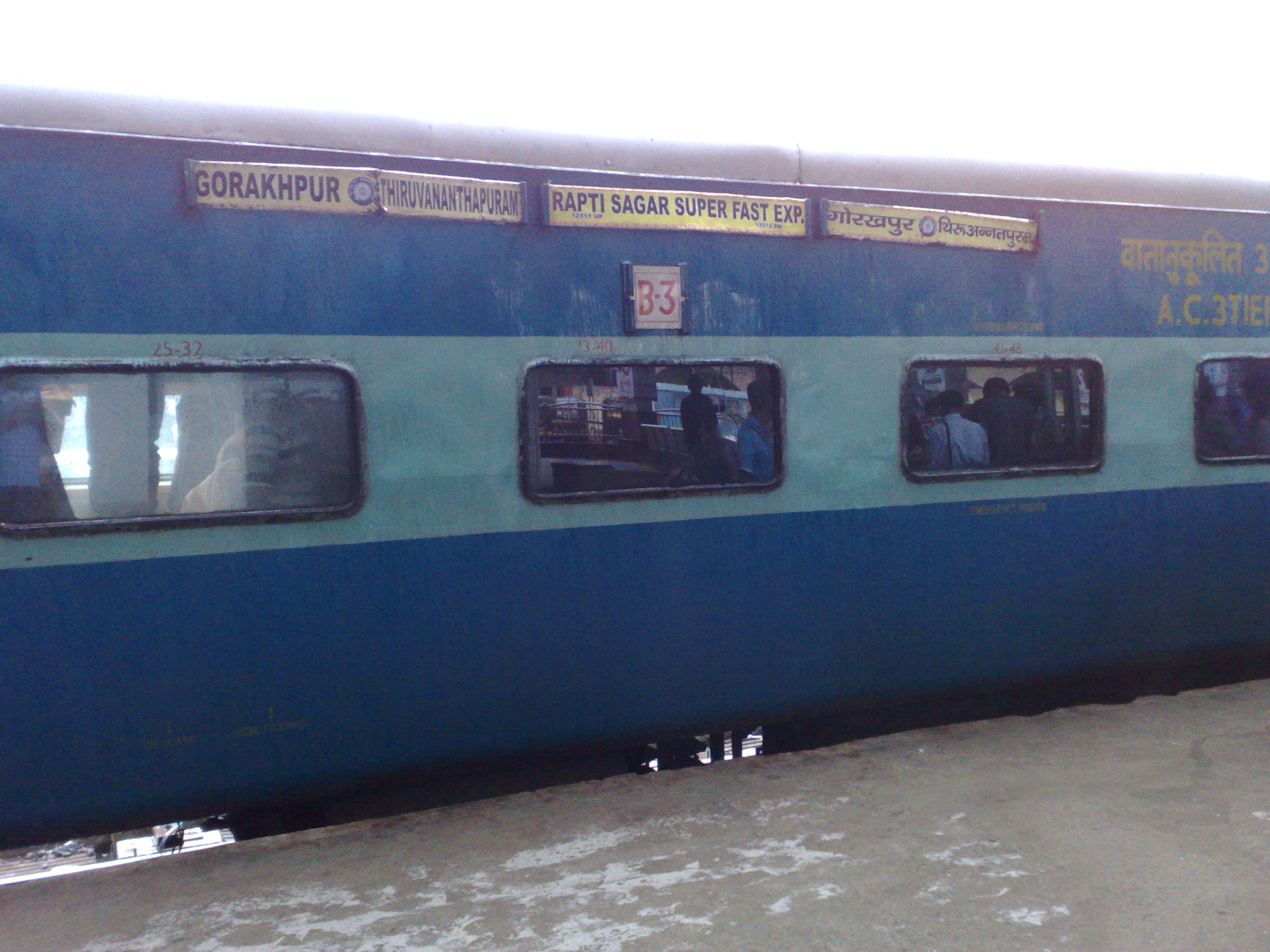

Overview
- First service: January 1, 1991; 35 years ago
- Current operator: North Eastern Railway zone

Route
- Termini: Thiruvananthapuram; Gorakhpur
- Stops: 60
- Distance travelled: 3,248 km (2,018 mi)
- Average journey time: 57 hours 05 minutes
- Service frequency: Tri-weekly
- Train number: 12511 / 12512

On-board services
- Classes: First AC, 2 Tier AC, 3 Tier AC, Sleeper Class, General
- Seating arrangements: Yes
- Sleeping arrangements: Yes
- Catering facilities: Available
- Observation facilities: Large windows
- Baggage facilities: Available

Technical
- Rolling stock: Loco: WAP-4/WAP-7
- Track gauge: 1,676 mm (5 ft 6 in)
- Operating speed: Average: 55 km/h Maximum speed: 110 km/h

The 12511/12512 Thiruvananthapuram–Gorakhpur Raptisagar Express is a long-distance Superfast Express train operated by the North Eastern Railway zone of Indian Railways. It runs between Thiruvananthapuram Central, serving the city of Thiruvananthapuram in Kerala, and Gorakhpur Junction, serving Gorakhpur in Uttar Pradesh via Chennai, Tamil Nadu.

== Overview ==
The Raptisagar Express refers to a set of long-distance express trains operating between southern and northern India. At present, these services run on a tri-weekly or weekly basis between Kochuveli / Ernakulam Junction in Kerala and Gorakhpur/Barauni in northern India.

The service was originally inaugurated as Train Nos. 5011/5012, operating between Gorakhpur and Cochin Harbour Terminus, running four days a week under the name Raptisagar Express. Alongside this, a bi-weekly service was introduced between Gorakhpur and Hyderabad as Train Nos. 5089/5090, later renumbered as 12589/12590 Secunderabad–Gorakhpur Express.

Subsequently, one weekly run of 5011/5012 was extended from Gorakhpur to Barauni, operating as Train Nos. 5221/5222, which later became 12521/12522 Ernakulam–Barauni–Ernakulam Raptisagar Express. Similarly, one weekly run of 5089/5090 was extended to Bengaluru (Yesvantpur) as Train Nos. 5091/5092, now operating as 12591/12592 Yesvantpur–Gorakhpur–Yesvantpur Express.

In the early 2000s, following the upgradation of these services to Superfast Express status, the train numbers were revised, and Train Nos. 12511/12512 were further extended to Thiruvananthapuram (Kochuveli).

== Schedule ==
12511 / 12512 Gorakhpur–Thiruvananthapuram North Raptisagar Express Schedule
Train Type	Superfast Express
Distance	3246 km (12511) / 3246 km (12512)
Average Speed	~57 km/h
Journey Time (GKP → TVCN)	~57 hrs 05 min
Journey Time (TVCN → GKP)	~56 hrs 40 min
Classes Available	2A, 3A, SL, GN, SLR
Operating Days	Thu, Fri, Sun
Operator	North Eastern Railway

== Route and halts ==
12511 Gorakhpur–Thiruvananthapuram North Raptisagar Express and 12512 Thiruvananthapuram North–Gorakhpur Raptisagar Express Schedule
Sr.	12511 GKP–TVCN				12512 TVCN–GKP			
Sr.	Station	Day	Arr.	Dep.	Station	Day	Arr.	Dep.
1	Gorakhpur Junction	1	—	06:33	Thiruvananthapuram North	1	—	06:35
2	Khalilabad	1	07:09	07:11	Kollam Junction	1	07:32	07:35
3	Basti	1	07:35	07:37	Kayankulam Junction	1	08:18	08:20
4	Mankapur Junction	1	08:21	08:23	Haripad	1	08:34	08:35
5	Gonda Junction	1	08:51	08:54	Ambalappuzha	1	08:50	08:51
6	Barabanki Junction	1	10:25	10:27	Alappuzha	1	09:02	09:05
7	Badshahnagar	1	11:00	11:03	Cherthala	1	09:24	09:25
8	Aishbagh	1	11:35	11:45	Ernakulam Junction	1	10:30	10:35
9	Unnao Junction	1	12:40	12:42	Aluva	1	11:05	11:07
10	Kanpur Central	1	13:12	13:17	Angamali	1	11:17	11:18
11	Pokhrayan	1	14:15	14:17	Chalakudi	1	11:33	11:34
12	Orai	1	14:51	14:53	Irinjalakuda	1	11:44	11:45
13	Virangana Lakshmibai Jhansi Junction	1	16:45	16:53	Thrissur	1	12:15	12:18
14	Lalitpur	1	17:48	17:50	Wadakancheri	1	12:38	12:39
15	Bhopal Junction	1	20:55	21:00	Ottappalam	1	13:19	13:20
16	Itarsi Junction	1	22:40	22:50	Palakkad Junction	1	13:45	13:50
17	Betul	2	00:30	00:32	Coimbatore Junction	1	15:20	15:25
18	Nagpur Junction	2	03:55	04:00	Erode Junction	1	16:55	17:05
19	Chandrapur	2	06:33	06:35	Salem Junction	1	17:55	18:00
20	Balharshah	2	07:35	07:40	Jolarpettai Junction	1	19:43	19:45
21	Warangal	2	11:18	11:20	Katpadi Junction	1	20:50	20:55
22	Vijayawada Junction	2	15:20	15:30	Chennai Central (Train Reversal)	1	23:05	23:35
23	Ongole	2	17:28	17:30	Gudur Junction	2	01:13	01:15
24	Gudur Junction	2	19:48	19:50	Vijayawada Junction	2	05:35	05:45
25	Chennai Central (Train Reversal)	2	22:40	23:10	Warangal	2	08:48	08:50
26	Katpadi Junction	3	01:05	01:10	Nagpur Junction	2	16:30	16:35
27	Salem Junction	3	03:47	03:50	Itarsi Junction	2	21:55	22:05
28	Erode Junction	3	04:50	05:00	Bhopal Junction	2	23:40	23:45
29	Coimbatore Junction	3	06:42	06:45	Virangana Lakshmibai Jhansi Junction	3	03:35	03:43
30	Palakkad Junction	3	07:55	08:00	Kanpur Central	3	07:55	08:05 30A-Ottapalam 08 23 /08 24//3//
31	Ernakulam Junction	3	10:55	11:00	Aishbagh	3	09:40	09:50
32	Alappuzha	3	11:52	11:55	Barabanki Junction	3	10:51	10:53
33	Kayankulam Junction	3	12:48	12:50	Gonda Junction	3	12:15	12:20
34	Kollam Junction	3	13:30	13:33	Basti	3	13:30	13:33
35	Thiruvananthapuram North	3	15:40	—	Gorakhpur Junction	3	15:15	—

Note - Only Major Junction is added in this list

== Coach composition ==
Category	Coaches	Total
Luggage/Parcel Rake (LPR)	LPR	1
General Unreserved (GEN)	GEN1, GEN2, GEN3, GEN4	4
AC 2 Tier (2A)	A1, A2	2
AC First Class (1A)	H1	1
AC 3 Tier (3A)	B1, B2, B3, B4, B5, B6, B7, B8	8
Pantry Car (PC)	PC	1
Sleeper Class (SL)	S1, S2, S3, S4	4
Sleeper cum Luggage Rake (SLRD) (Divyangjan)	SLRD	1
Total Coaches		22

- Primary Maintenance – [Depot Name]
