= Gorakhpur–Pune Express (via Lucknow) =

Express train in India

Overview
- Service type: Express
- First service: 26 March 2015
- Current operator(s): North Eastern Railways

Route
- Termini: Gorakhpur Junction; Pune Junction
- Stops: 20
- Distance travelled: 379 km (235 mi)
- Average journey time: 33 hours 55min mins
- Service frequency: Weekly
- Train number(s): 15029 / 15030

On-board services
- Class(es): AC 1st Class, AC 2 tier, AC 3 tier, Sleeper, General
- Seating arrangements: Yes
- Sleeping arrangements: Yes
- Catering facilities: No pantry car attached
- Baggage facilities: Yes

Technical
- Rolling stock: LHB coach
- Track gauge: Broad gauge 1,676 mm (5 ft 6 in)
- Operating speed: 140 km/h (87 mph) maximum, 55 km/h (34 mph), including halts

Gorakhpur–Pune Express is an Express train belonging to North Eastern Railway zone of Indian Railways that run between Gorakhpur Junction and Pune Junction in India.

This train was inaugurated on 26 March 2015, flagged off by Manoj Sinha (Former Minister of State Railways) for direct connectivity between Gorakhpur and Pune.

Till 23 May 2019, it was running with ICF coach after that its also converted into LHB coach for more comfortable travel.

== Service ==
Frequency of this train is weekly and it covers the distance of 1750 km with an average speed of 52 km/h on both sides.

== Routes ==
This train passes through Basti, Gonda Junction, Lucknow Charbagh, Kanpur Central, Jhansi Junction, Bina Junction, Bhopal Junction, Itarsi Junction, Bhusaval Junction, Manmad Junction & Daund Junction on both sides.

== Traction ==
As the route is electrified a WAP-4 loco pulls the train to its destination on both sides.
