= Gorakhpur–Mailani Express =

Train in India

Gorakhpur-Izzatnagar Express
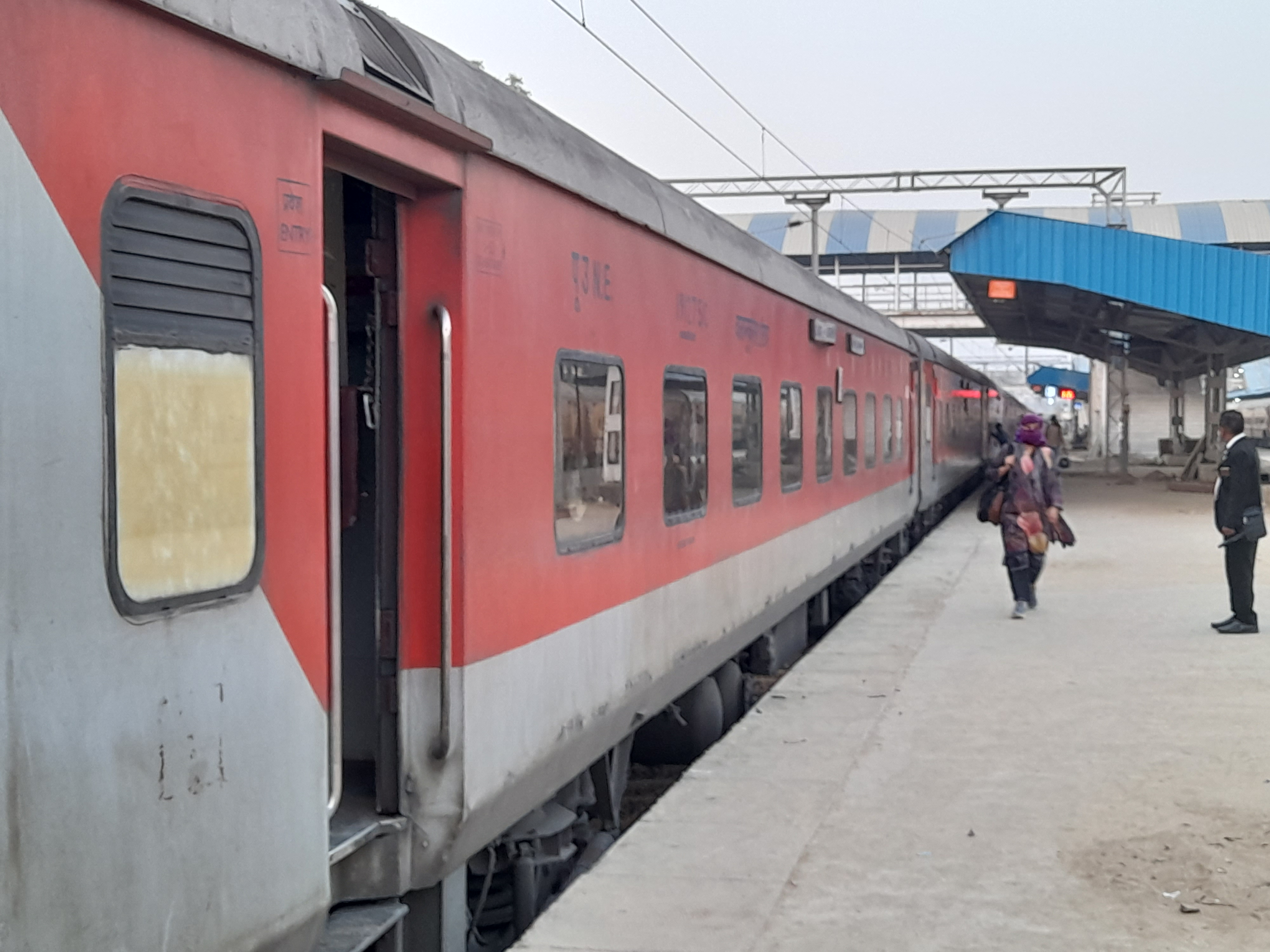
- 15009 GKP-IZN Express standing at Daliganj Junction

Overview
- Service type: Mail Express
- Status: Operating
- Predecessor: 15009/15010 Gorakhpur-Pilibhit Express 15009/15010 Gorakhpur-Mailani Express 15009/15010 Gorakhpur-Sitapur Express 15009/15010 Gorakhpur-Gomti Nagar Express
- First service: 14 September 2016; 10 years ago
- Current operator: North Eastern Railway

Route
- Termini: Gorakhpur (GKP); Izzatnagar (IZN)
- Stops: 29
- Distance travelled: 659 km (409 mi)
- Average journey time: 14 hours 30 minutes
- Service frequency: Daily. (Note: Runs seven days in a week for every direction.)
- Train number: 15009 / 15010

On-board services
- Classes: AC 1 Tier, AC 2 Tier, AC 3 Tier, Sleeper Class, General Unreserved, PWD
- Seating arrangements: No
- Sleeping arrangements: Yes
- Catering facilities: E-catering only
- Observation facilities: Largest windows
- Baggage facilities: No
- Other facilities: Below the seats

Technical
- Rolling stock: LHB coach
- Track gauge: 1,676 mm (5 ft 6 in)
- Operating speed: 41 km/h (25 mph) average including halts.

The 15009 / 15010 Gorakhpur–Izzatnagar Express is an Express train belonging to North Eastern Railway zone that runs between Izzatnagar railway station and Gorakhpur Junction in India. It is currently being operated with 15009/15010 train numbers on a daily basis.

== Service ==
The 15009/Gorakhpur–Izzatnagar Express has an average speed of 42 km/h and covers 649 km in 14.5h.

The 15010/Izzatnagar–Gorakhpur Express has an average speed of 37 km/h and covers 649 km in 14.5h.

== Route and halts ==
The important halts of the train are:

- Gorakhpur Junction
- Anandnagar Junction
- Barhni
- Pachperwa
- Tulsipur
- Balrampur
- Gonda Junction
- Barabanki Junction
- Gomti Nagar
- Badshahnagar
- Sitapur Junction
- Lakhimpur
- Gola Gokarannath
- Mailani Junction
- Pilibhit junction
- Bhojipura Junction
- Izzatnagar

== Coach composition ==
The train has LHB rakes with max speed of 110 kmph. The train consists of 22 coaches:

- 9 AC III Tier
- 1 AC I Tier
- 2 AC II Tier
- 4 Sleeper coaches
- 4 General Unreserved
- 2 Seating cum Luggage Rake

== Traction ==
Both trains are hauled by a Gonda or Izzatnagar Loco Shed-based WAP-7 Electric locomotive from Gorakhpur to Izzatnagar and vice versa.

== See also ==
- Gorakhpur Junction railway station
- Izzatnagar railway station
