= Lokmanya Express =

Train in India

Overview
- Service type: Express
- First service: 26 November 2016; 9 years ago
- Current operator: Central Railway

Route
- Termini: Mumbai LTT (LTT); Gorakhpur (GKP)
- Stops: 14
- Distance travelled: 1,746 km (1,085 mi)
- Average journey time: 31 hours 20 minutes
- Service frequency: Weekly (Note: Runs one days in a week for every direction.)
- Train number: 11079 / 11080

On-board services
- Classes: AC 2 Tier, AC 3 Tier, Sleeper Class, General Unreserved
- Seating arrangements: No
- Sleeping arrangements: Yes
- Catering facilities: Available
- Observation facilities: Large windows
- Baggage facilities: No
- Other facilities: Below the seats

Technical
- Rolling stock: LHB coach
- Track gauge: 1,676 mm (5 ft 6 in)
- Operating speed: 47 km/h (29 mph) average including halts.

The 11079 / 11080 Lokmanya Express is an express train belonging to Indian Railways that run between Gorakhpur Junction and Lokmanya Tilak Terminus (Mumbai) in India. It operates as train number 11080 from Gorakhpur Junction to Lokmanya Tilak Terminus and as train number 11079 in the reverse direction.

== Service ==
The 11079/Mumbai LTT - Gorakhpur Lokmanya Express (Via Barhni) has an average speed of 52 km/h and covers 1746 km in 33 hrs 40 mins. 11080/Gorakhpur - Mumbai LTT Lokmanya Express (via Barhni) has an average speed of 50 km/h and 1746 km in 34 hrs 50 mins.

== Route and halts ==
The important halts of the train are:

- Lokmanya Tilak Terminus
- Kalyan Junction
- Nasik Road
- Bhusaval Junction
- Khandwa Junction
- Itarsi Junction
- Rani Kamalapati
- Bhopal Junction
- Jhansi Junction
- Orai
- Kanpur Central
- Lucknow Charbagh
- Barabanki Junction
- Gonda Junction
- Balrampur
- Jharkhandi
- Tulsipur
- Barhni
- Naugarh
- Anandnagar Junction
- Gorakhpur Junction

== Coach composite ==
The train consists of 23 coaches:

- 1 AC II tier
- 3 AC III tier
- 13 sleeper coaches
- 4 general
- 2 second-class luggage/parcel van

== Traction ==
Both trains are hauled by a Kalyan Loco Shed based WAP-7 electric locomotive from Mumbai LTT to Gorakhpur Junction and vice versa.

== Direction reversal ==
The train reverses its direction one time:

- Lucknow Charbagh
