= Anand Nagar Junction railway station =

Railway station in Uttar Pradesh, India

Anand Nagar Junction

General information
- Location: Pharenda, Maharajganj district, Uttar Pradesh; India
- Coordinates: 27°05′58″N 83°16′11″E
- System: Indian Railways station
- Owner: Indian Railways
- Operator: North Eastern Railway
- Lines: Gorakhpur–Nautanwa & Gorakhpur–Barhni–Gonda line
- Platforms: 3
- Tracks: 06

Construction
- Structure type: Standard
- Parking: Yes
- Cycle facilities: Yes

Other information
- Status: Functioning
- Station code: ANDN
- Zone(s): North Eastern Railway
- Division(s): Lucknow NER
Location
- Location within India Location within Uttar Pradesh

Anand Nagar Junction railway station is located in Pharenda city of Maharajganj district, Uttar Pradesh. It serves Pharenda city. Its code is 'ANDN'. It has three platforms. Passenger, DEMU, Express, and Superfast trains including Humsafar Exp. halt here.

== Trains ==
- Gorakhpur–Panvel Express (via Barhni)
- Lokmanya Express
- Gorakhpur–Lokmanya Tilak Terminus Express (via Barhni)
- Bandra Terminus–Gorakhpur Antyodaya Express
- Gorakhpur−Badshahnagar Intercity Express
- Gorakhpur–Sitapur Express (via Barhni)
- Gorakhpur–Bandra Terminus Express (via Barhni)
- Gorakhpur–Anand Vihar Terminal Humsafar Express (via Barhni)
- Durg–Nautanwa Express (via Sultanpur)
- Durg–Nautanwa Express (via Varanasi)
- Gorakhpur–Nautanwa Express
