= Orai railway station =

Railway station in Uttar Pradesh, India

Orai Railway Station
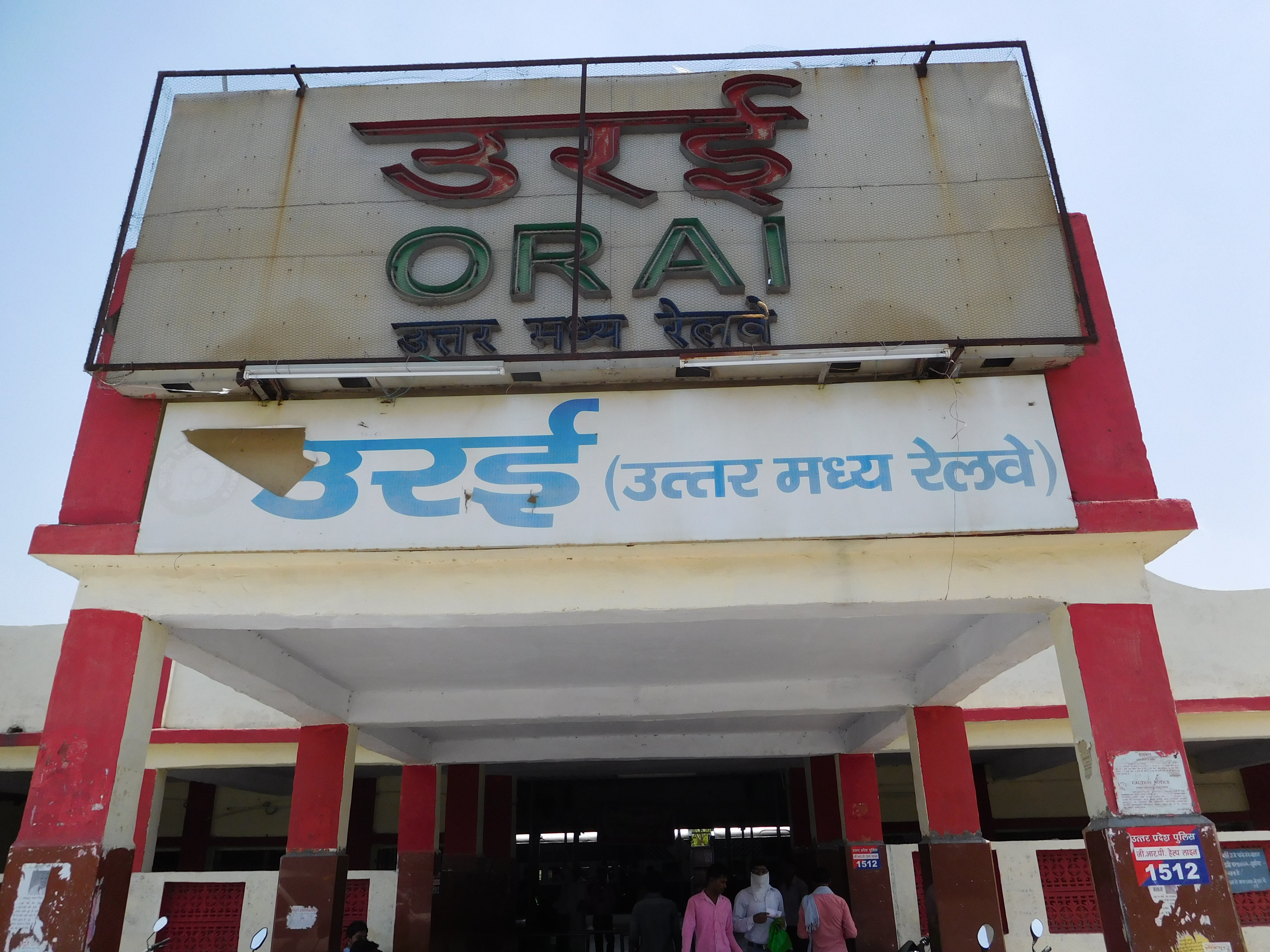

General information
- Location: Orai, Jalaun, Uttar Pradesh; India
- Coordinates: 25.9828°N 79.4598°E
- Elevation: 139 metres (456 ft)
- System: Indian Railways station
- Owner: Indian Railways
- Operator: North Central Railways
- Platforms: 4
- Tracks: 5 (double electrified BG)
- Connections: Auto stand

Construction
- Structure type: At grade
- Parking: Yes
- Cycle facilities: No

Other information
- Status: Functioning
- Station code: ORAI
- Zone(s): North Central Railways
- Division(s): Jhansi
Location
- Location within India Location within Uttar Pradesh

Orai Railway Station is a railway station on Jhansi–Kanpur rail line of North Central Railway in Jalaun district, Uttar Pradesh. Its code is ORAI. It serves Orai city. The station consists of four platforms. The platforms are well sheltered. The station lies between Kanpur–Jhansi section and well connected to all over India and station comes under the "model railway station" category.

== Trains ==
The following trains run from Orai railway station:

- Mumbai LTT–Lucknow AC SF Special Fare Special
- Pune–Lucknow Express
- Bhopal–Lucknow Jn Special Fare Special
- Ahmedabad–Darbhanga Sabarmati Express
- Gorakhpur–Yesvantpur Express
- Barauni–Gwalior Mail
- Chennai–Lucknow Express
- Sabarmati Express
- Pratham Swatrantata Sangram Express
- Bhopal–Pratapgarh Express (via Lucknow)
- Chhapra–Mumbai CST Antyodaya Express
- Gorakhpur–Mumbai Antyodaya Express
- Gorakhpur–Lokmanya Tilak Terminus Superfast Express
- Pune–Gorakhpur Express
- Lokmanya Tilak Terminus–Gorakhpur Express
- Gorakhpur–Secunderabad Express
- Indore–Rajendra Nagar Express (via Sultanpur)
- Indore–Rajendra Nagar Express (via Faizabad)
- Jhansi–Lucknow Jn. Intercity Express
- Jhansi–Kanpur Passenger (unreserved)
- Jhansi–Lucknow Passenger (unreserved)
- Kanpur–Valsad Udyog Karmi Express
- Kushinagar Express
- Lucknow Jn–Pune Express
- Mumbai LTT–Sultanpur Superfast Express
- Panchvalley Passenger
- Pushpak Express
- Raptisagar Express
- Gorakhpur–Panvel Express (via Barhni)
- Gorakhpur–Bandra Terminus Express (via Barhni)
- Gorakhpur–Lokmanya Tilak Terminus Express (via Barhni)
