= Tulsipur railway station =

Railway station in Uttar Pradesh

Tulsipur
- Indian Railways Logo

General information
- Location: Tulsipur, Balrampur district, Uttar Pradesh; India
- Coordinates: 27°31′54″N 82°24′29″E
- System: Indian Railways station
- Owner: Indian Railways
- Operator: North Eastern Railway
- Line: Gorakhpur–Barhni line
- Platforms: 2
- Tracks: 2

Construction
- Structure type: Standard
- Parking: Yes

Other information
- Status: Functioning
- Station code: TLR
- Zone(s): North Eastern Railway
- Division(s): Lucknow NER
Location
- Location within India Location within Uttar Pradesh

Tulsipur railway station is located in Tulsipur town of Balrampur district, Uttar Pradesh. It serves Tulsipur town. Its code is TLR. It has two platforms. Passenger, DEMU, and Express trains halt here.

== Trains ==
- Gorakhpur–Panvel Express (via Barhni)
- Lokmanya Tilak Terminus–Gorakhpur Lokmanya Express (via Barhni)
- Gorakhpur–Lokmanya Tilak Terminus Express (via Barhni)
- Gorakhpur−Badshahnagar Intercity Express
- Gorakhpur–Sitapur Express (via Barhni)
- Gorakhpur–Bandra Terminus Express (via Barhni)
- Gorakhpur–Anand Vihar Terminal Humsafar Express (via Barhni)
