= Balrampur railway station =

Railway station in Uttar Pradesh, India

General information
- Location: SH 26, Balrampur, Uttar Pradesh; India
- Coordinates: 27.4156°N 82.1611°E
- Elevation: 113 metres (371 ft)
- System: Indian Railways station
- Owner: Indian Railways
- Operator: North Eastern Railway
- Platforms: 2
- Tracks: 4
- Connections: Auto stand

Construction
- Structure type: Standard (on-ground station)
- Parking: Yes (Bicycle/Scooter only)
- Cycle facilities: No

Other information
- Status: Functioning
- Station code: BLP
- Zone(s): North Eastern Railway
- Division(s): Lucknow NER division
Location
- Location within India Location within Uttar Pradesh

Balrampur railway station is a railway station in Balrampur district, Uttar Pradesh. Its code is BLP. It serves Balrampur city. The station consists of two platforms. The platforms are not well sheltered. It lacks many facilities including water and sanitation.

== Major trains ==
Some of the important trains that runs from Balrampur are:

- Gorakhpur–Anand Vihar Terminal Humsafar Express (via Barhni)
- Lokmanya Express (11079/80)
- Sushasan Express (11111/11112)
- Lucknow Junction–Nakaha Jungle Passenger (55050/31)
- Gorakhpur–Gonda DEMU (75005/02)
- Gorakhpur–Gonda Junction DEMU (75007/08)
- Daliganj Junction–Nakaha Jungle Passenger (55032/49)
- Gorakhpur–Panvel Express (via Barhni)
- Bandra Terminus–Gorakhpur Antyodaya Express
- Gorakhpur–Bandra Terminus Express (via Barhni)
- Gorakhpur–Badshahnagar Intercity Express
- Gorakhpur–Sitapur Express (via Barhni)
- Champaran Humsafar Express (Katihar–Old Delhi railway station) (15705/15706)
