= Barhni railway station =

Railway station in Uttar Pradesh

Barhni
- Indian Railways logo

General information
- Location: Barhni, Siddharthnagar district, Uttar Pradesh; India
- Coordinates: 27°29′44″N 82°47′29″E
- System: Indian Railways station
- Owner: Indian Railways
- Operator: North Eastern Railway
- Line: Gorakhpur–Nautanwa–Barhni line
- Platforms: 3
- Tracks: 3

Construction
- Structure type: Standard
- Parking: Yes

Other information
- Status: Functioning
- Station code: BNY
- Zone(s): North Eastern Railway
- Division(s): Lucknow NER
Location
- Location within India Location within Uttar Pradesh

Barhni railway station is located in Barhni town of Siddharthnagar district, Uttar Pradesh. It serves Barhni town. Its code is 'BNY'. It has three platforms. Passenger, DEMU, Express, and Superfast trains halt here.

== Trains ==
- Gorakhpur–Panvel Express (via Barhni)
- Lokmanya Tilak Terminus–Gorakhpur Lokmanya Express (via Barhni)
- Gorakhpur–Lokmanya Tilak Terminus Express (via Barhni)
- Gorakhpur−Badshahnagar Intercity Express
- Gorakhpur–Lakhimpur Express (via Barhni, Lucknow)
- Gorakhpur–Bandra Terminus Express (via Barhni)
- Gorakhpur–Anand Vihar Terminal Humsafar Express (via Barhni)
