= Ait Junction railway station =

Railway station in Uttar Pradesh, India

Ait railway station
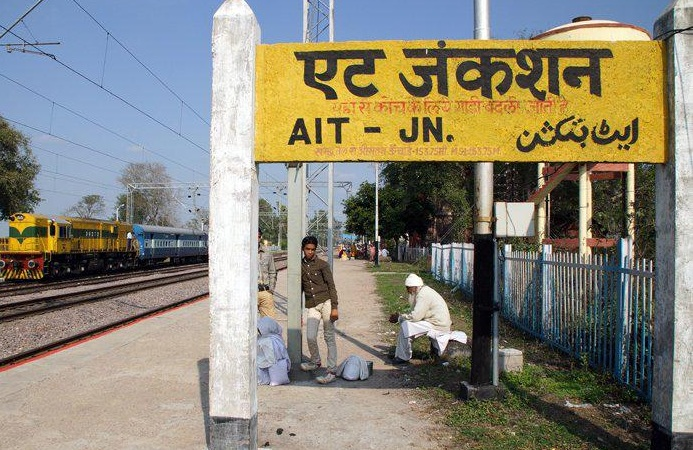

General information
- Location: Jhansi, Uttar Pradesh; India
- Coordinates: 25°50′0″N 79°14′1″E
- Elevation: 156 metres (512 ft)
- Operator: North Central Railway
- Platforms: 04
- Tracks: 05

Construction
- Structure type: Standard (on-ground station)
- Parking: Yes

Other information
- Status: Functioning
- Station code: AIT
- Zone(s): North Central Railway
- Division(s): Jhansi
Location
- Location within India Location within Uttar Pradesh

Ait Junction railway station (station code AIT) is a small railway station located in Jalaun, Konch (25°50′0″N 79°14′1″E) in the Indian state of Uttar Pradesh. Nearby major railway station is Jhansi Jn and the airport is Gwalior Airport. It belongs to North Central, Jhansi Jn.

== Major trains ==
- Konch Ait Passenger
- Ait Konch Passenger
- Kanpur–Jhansi Passenger
- Lucknow–Jhansi Passenger
- Panchvalley Passenger Slip 2
- Sabarmati Express
- Jhansi–Lucknow Passenger
- Kushinagar Express
- Gwalior–Barauni Mail
- Rishikesh–Bandikui Passenger
- Jhansi–Lucknow Intercity Express
- Lucknow–Jhansi Intercity Express

== See also ==
- Northern Railway zone
- Ait, Uttar Pradesh
