= Harda railway station =

Railway station in Madhya Pradesh

Harda

General information
- Location: Zoen 1.Railway Area File Ward 29, National Highway 59A, Harda, Madhya Pradesh; India
- Coordinates: 22.3385°N 77.1012°E
- Elevation: 289 metres (948 ft)
- System: Indian Railways station
- Owner: Indian Railways
- Operator: West Central Railway
- Line: Jabalpur–Bhusaval section
- Platforms: 4
- Tracks: 7
- Connections: Auto stand, city bus stop

Construction
- Structure type: Standard Good (on-ground station)
- Parking: Yes
- Cycle facilities: No

Other information
- Status: Functioning
- Station code: HD
- Zone(s): West Central Railway
- Division(s): Bhopal

History
- Opened: All Time
Location
- Location within India Location within Madhya Pradesh

Harda railway station is a major railway station in Harda district, Madhya Pradesh. Its code is HD. It serves Harda city. The station consists of four platforms, all well sheltered. It has facilities including water and sanitation.

== 2015 Accident ==
In August 2015, Lokmanya Tilak Terminus–Varanasi Junction Kamayani Express derailed near Harda, Madhya Pradesh, bogies fell into Machak river after flash floods dislodged a culvert near Machak river causing rail misalignment. The accident took place between Kurawan and Bhiringi railway station in Harda district on the Jabalpur–Bhusaval section, approx.100 km from Itarsi Junction. Rajendra Nagar Terminal–Mumbai Lokmanya Tilak Terminus Janata Express also derailed at the same spot.
