= Nasik Road railway station =

Railway station in Maharashtra, India

Nasik Road/ Nashik Road
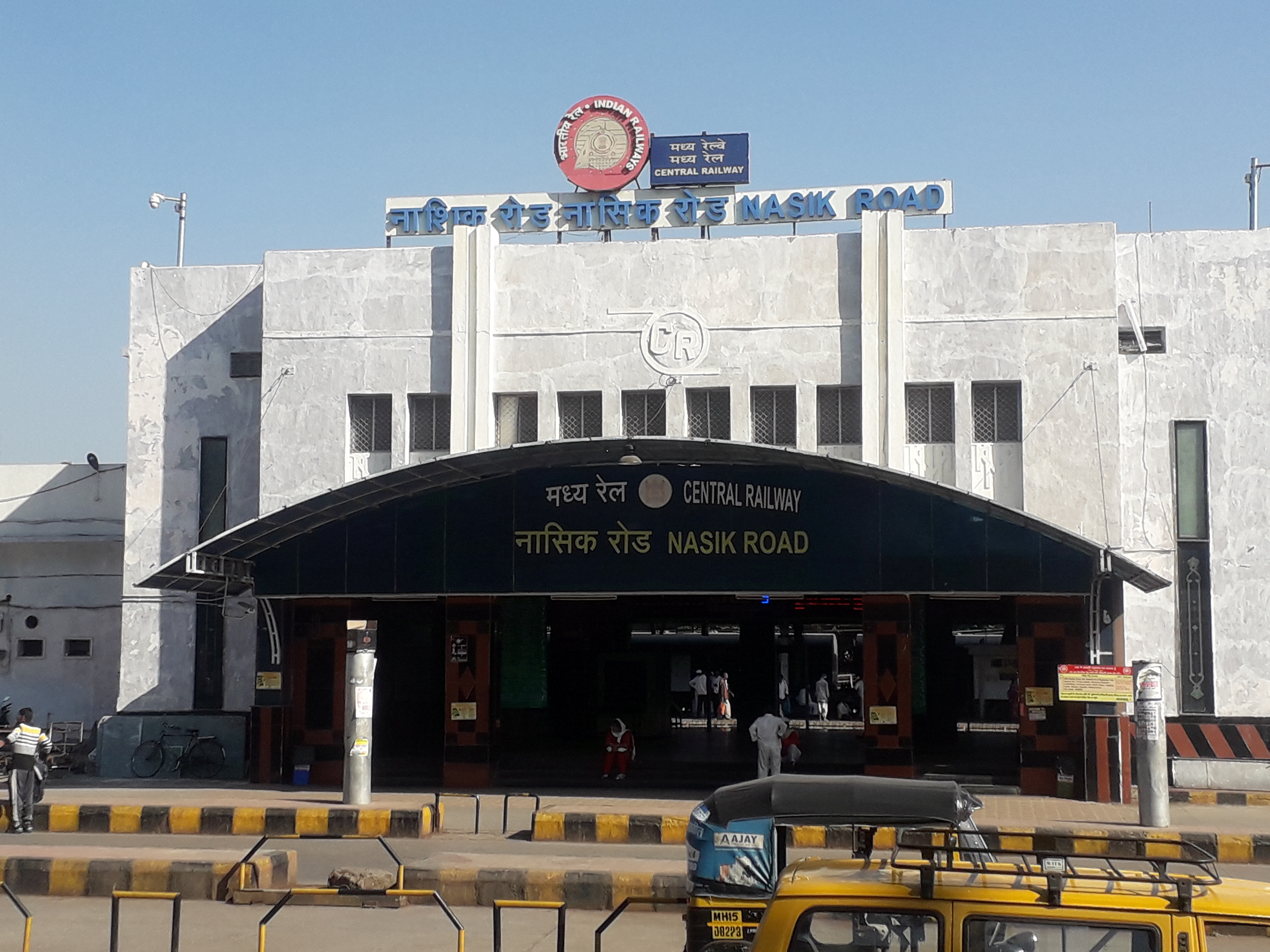

General information
- Location: Nashik-Pune Road, Nashik, Maharashtra, PIN 422101; India
- Coordinates: 19°56′50″N 73°50′32″E
- Elevation: 560.610 metres (1,839.27 ft)
- System: Indian Railways station
- Owner: Indian Railways
- Operator: Central Railway
- Lines: Howrah–Nagpur–Mumbai line Howrah–Allahabad–Mumbai line New Delhi–Bhopal–Mumbai line
- Platforms: 4+ (1 Proposed)
- Tracks: 7
- Connections: Taxi, Rickshaw, Citybus,

Construction
- Structure type: Standard, on ground
- Parking: Available
- Cycle facilities: Available (HEXI)

Other information
- Status: Active
- Station code: NK
- Zone(s): Central railway
- Division(s): Bhusawal

History
- Opened: 1862; 164 years ago
- Electrified: Yes, in 1921
- Former names: Great Indian Peninsula Railway

Passengers
- 700k daily passenger

Services
Preceding station	Indian Railways	Following station
Odha towards ?	Central Railway zone Bhusawal–Kalyan section	Devlali towards ?
Location
- Location within Maharashtra Location within India
- Interactive map

Nasik Road Railway Station or Nashik Road Railway Station serves Nashik city, Nashik Road and surrounding areas in Nashik district in the Indian state of Maharashtra. It is the main railway station of Nashik. It is one of the oldest and busiest railway stations in India. It is located on Mumbai–Delhi, Mumbai–Kolkata main line. It is an A1 category railway station. It comes under the Bhusawal Division of Central Railway. Nearly 300 trains have stops at this railway station. It is one of the cleanest railway stations in India.

== History ==
The first train in India travelled from Mumbai to Thane on 16 April 1853. By May 1854, Great Indian Peninsula Railway's Mumbai–Thane line was extended to Kalyan Junction. Bhusaval Junction was set up in 1860, but the service started in the mid-1860s. The line was extended to Khandwa in 1866 and to Nagpur in 1867.

=== Electrification ===
The railways in the Igatpuri–Manmad section were electrified in 1967–69.

== Amenities ==
Amenities at Nasik Road railway station include: tourist information centre, computerized reservation office, waiting room, retiring room, light refreshments, book stall, lift and escalator.

Nasik Road railway station is located at a distance of 9 km from Nashik city centre. Taxis, auto & city buses are available at the railway station for travel to different parts of the city and outside.

== Busy station ==
Nasik Road railway station is amongst the top hundred booking stations of the Indian Railway.

== Awards ==
Nasik Road station has been awarded as the 6th cleanest railway station in the A1/A category in India by Indian Railway (As per 2021 and 2022).

== Gallery ==
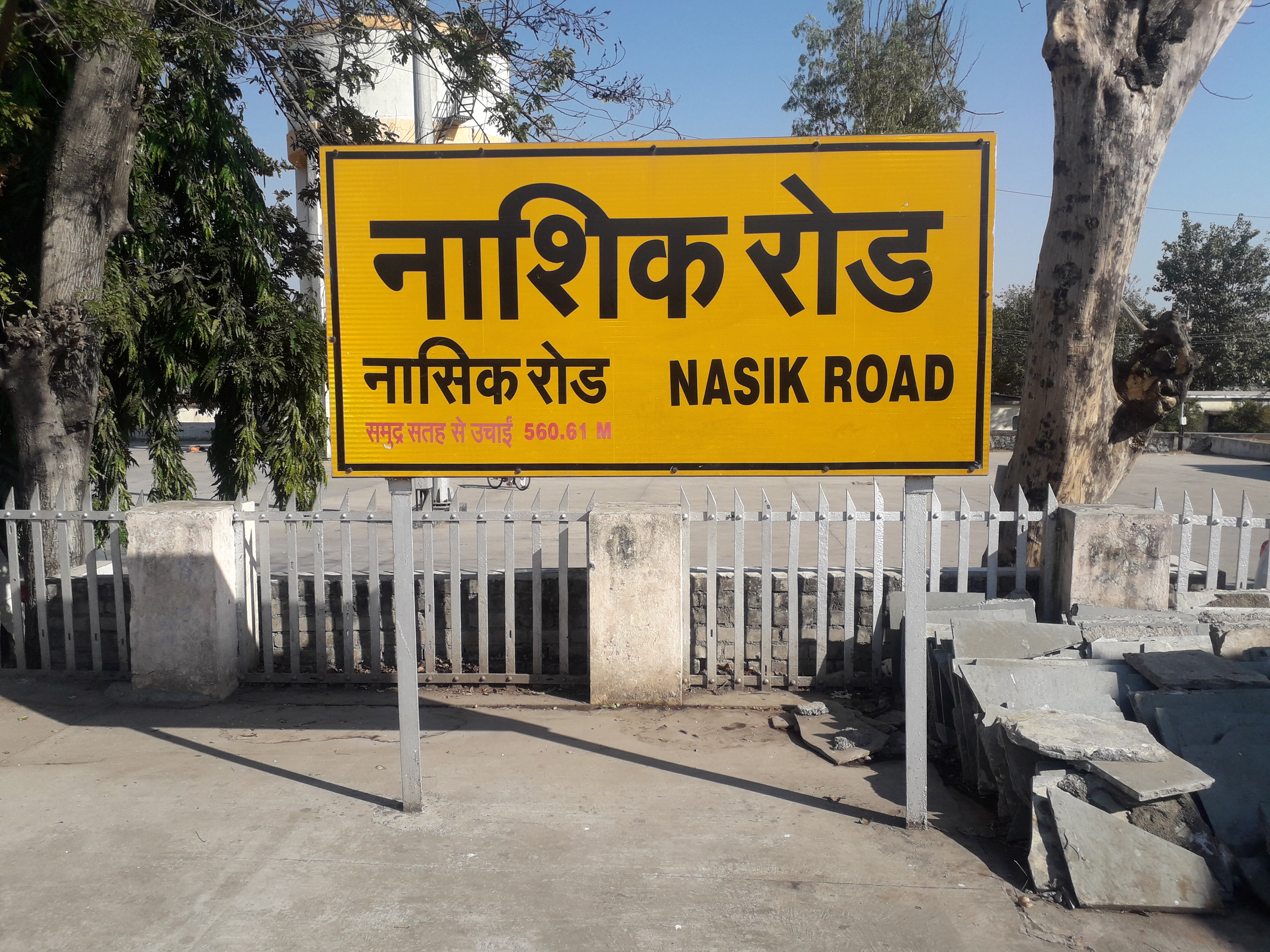
Nasik Road railway station – Station board

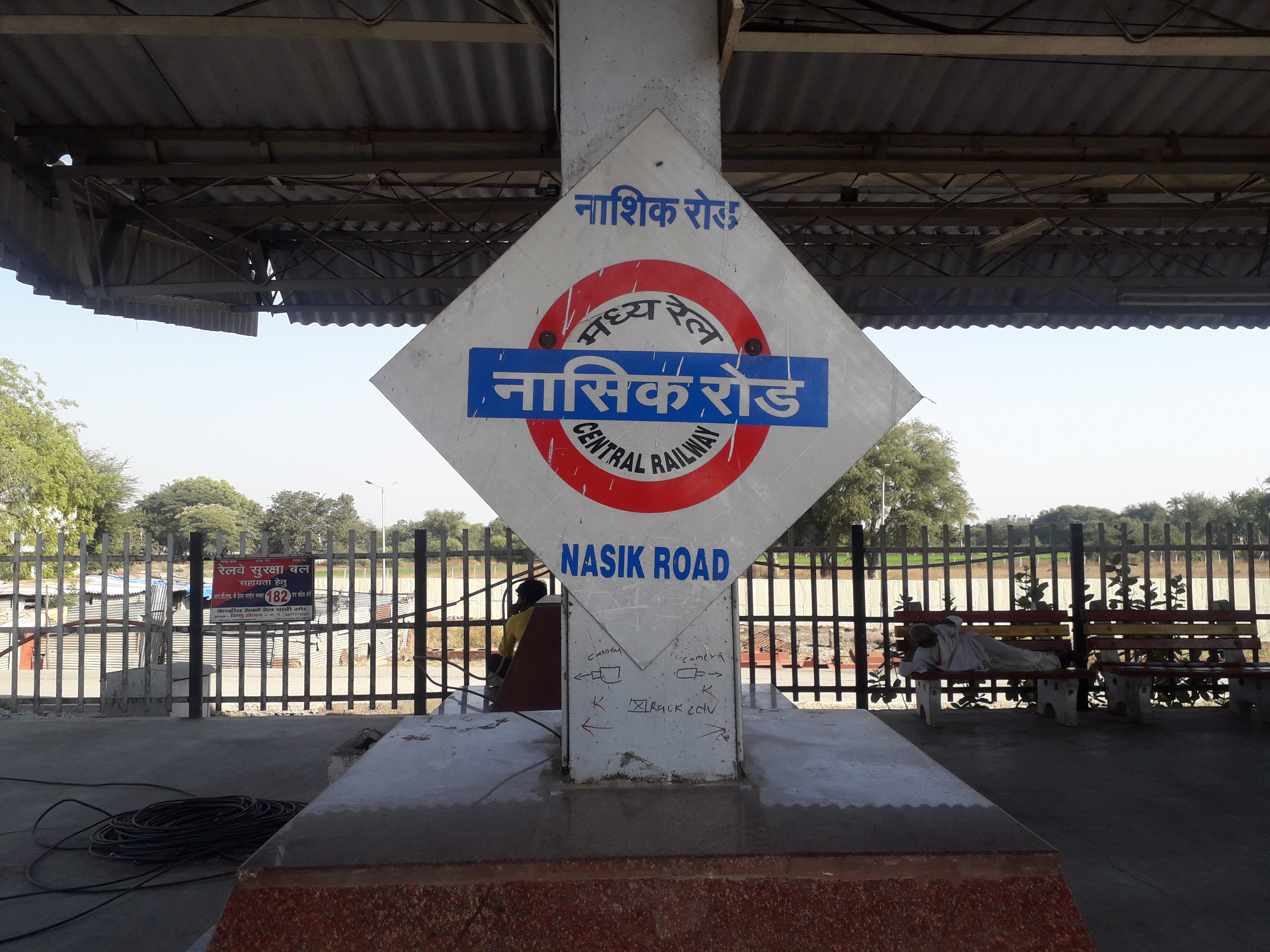
Nasik Road railway station – Central Railway – Platform board

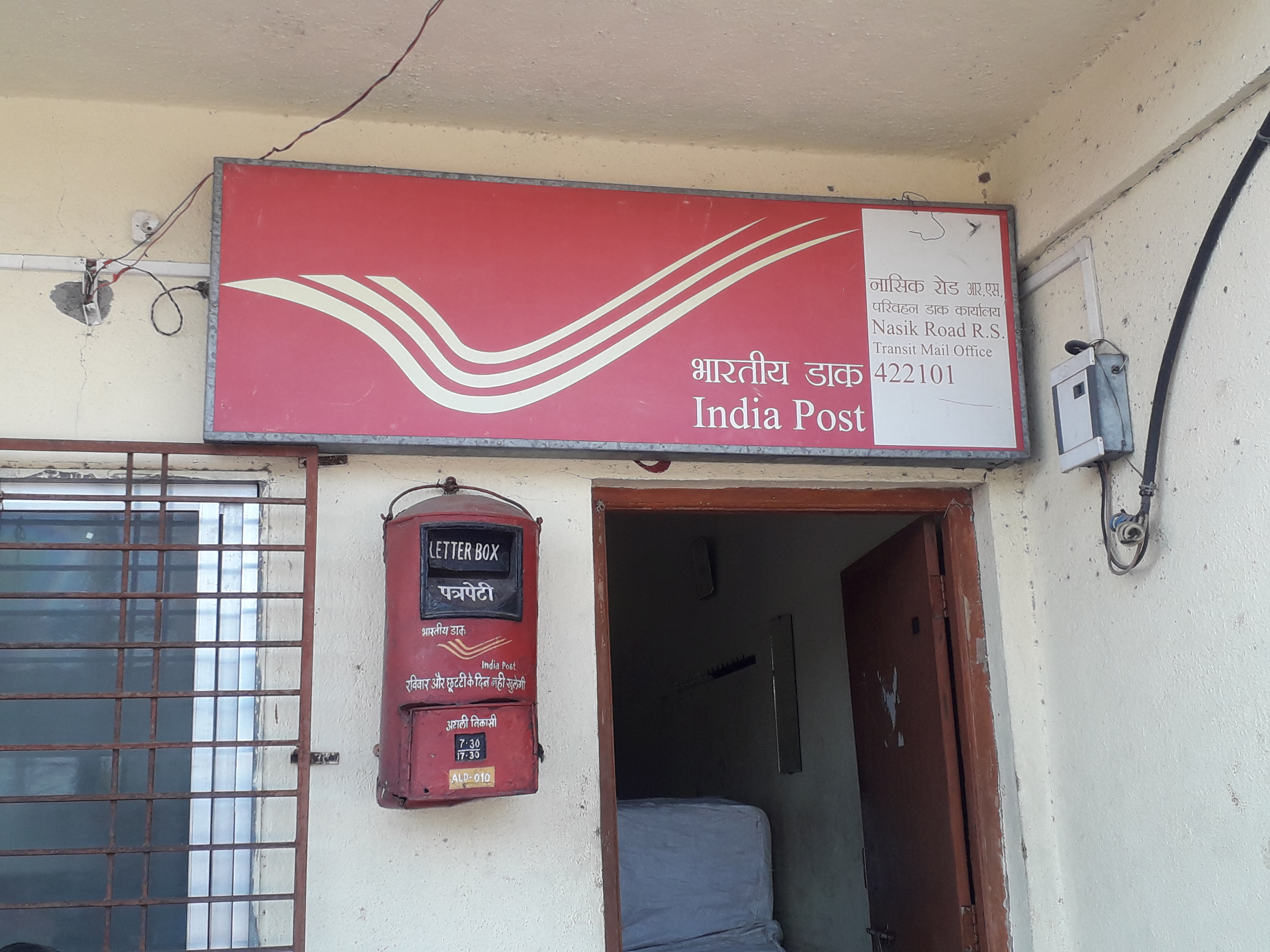
Nasik Road railway station – Railway Mail Service

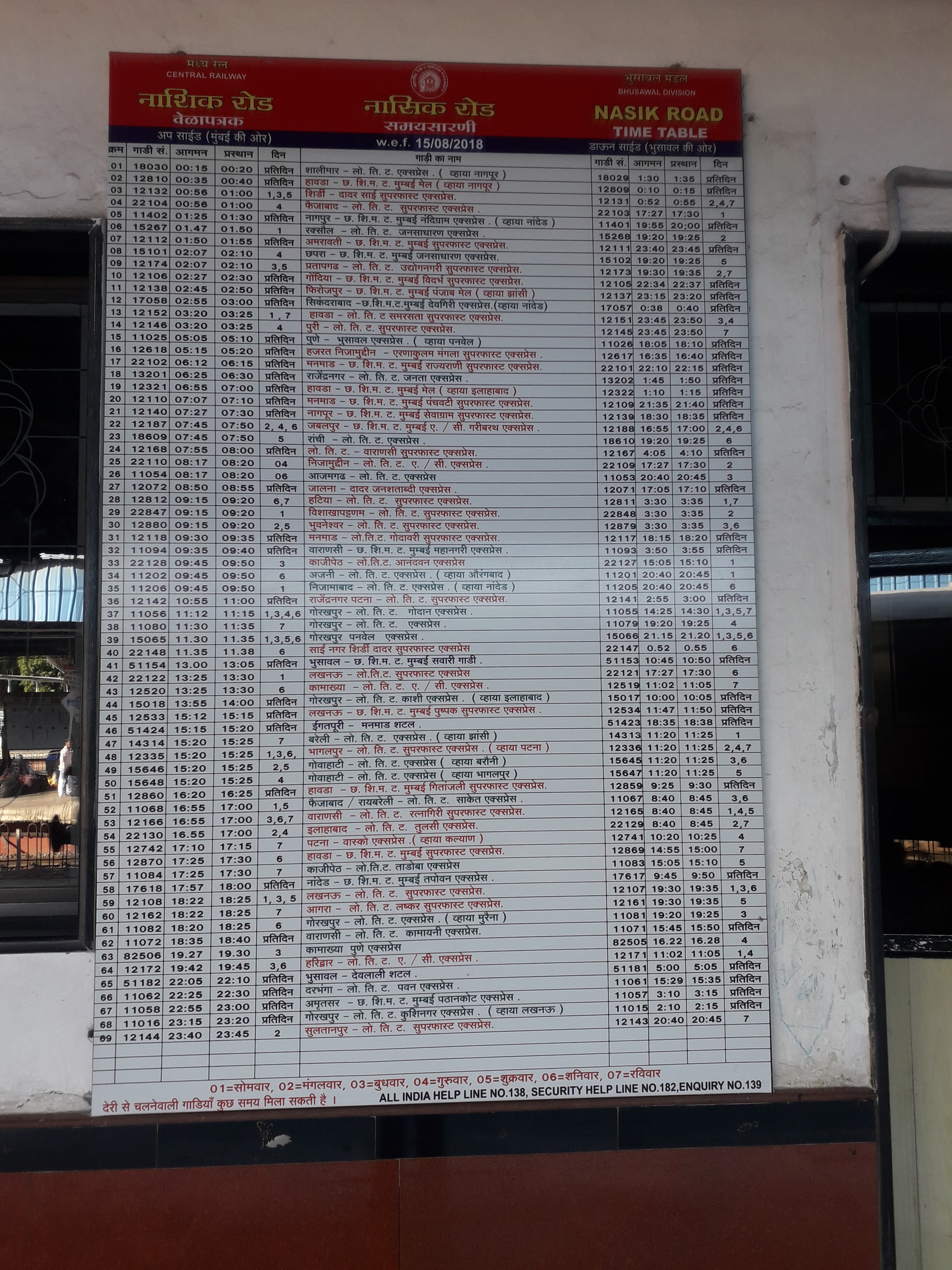
Nasik Road railway station – Train schedule

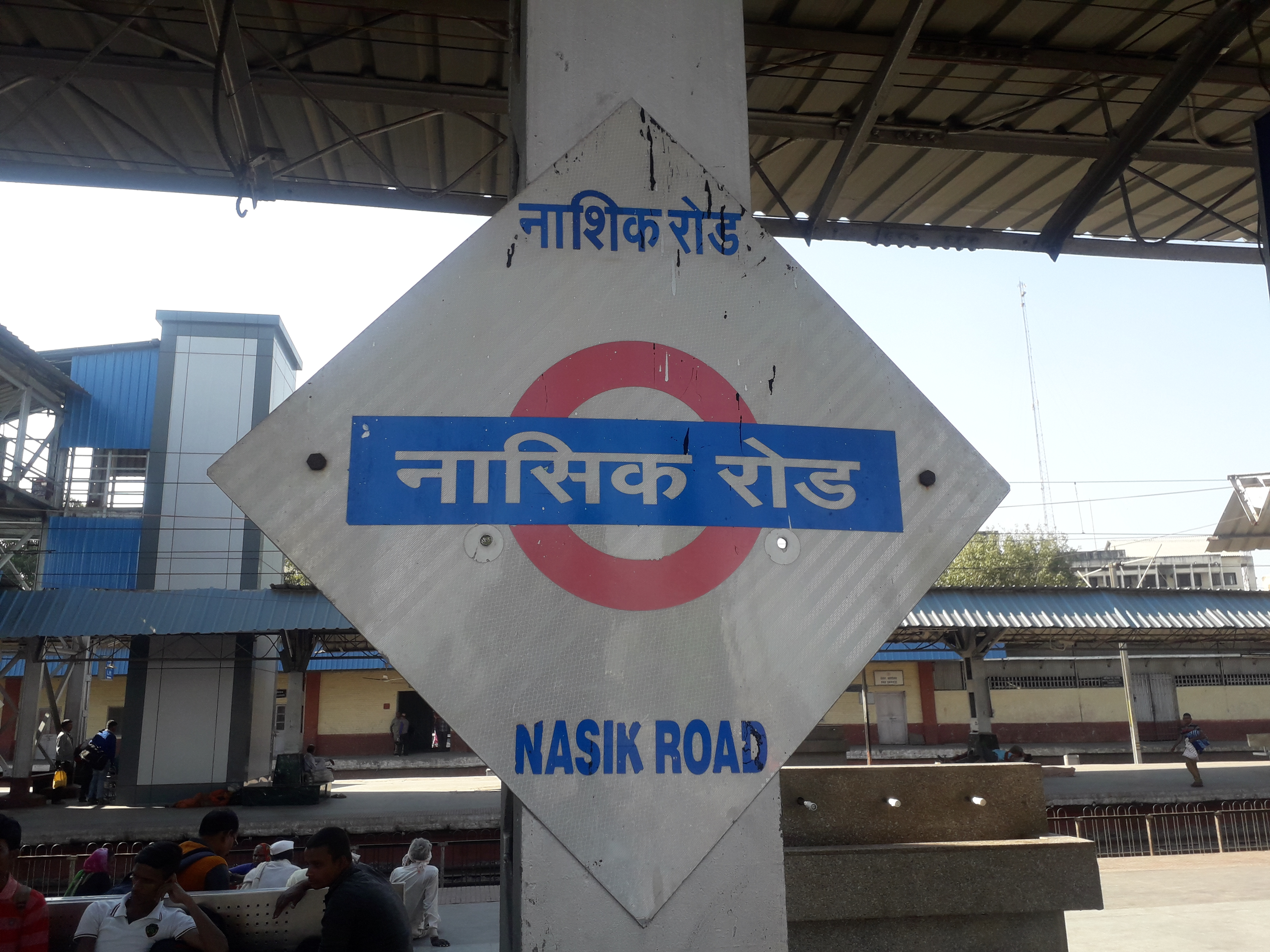
Nasik Road railway station – Platform board

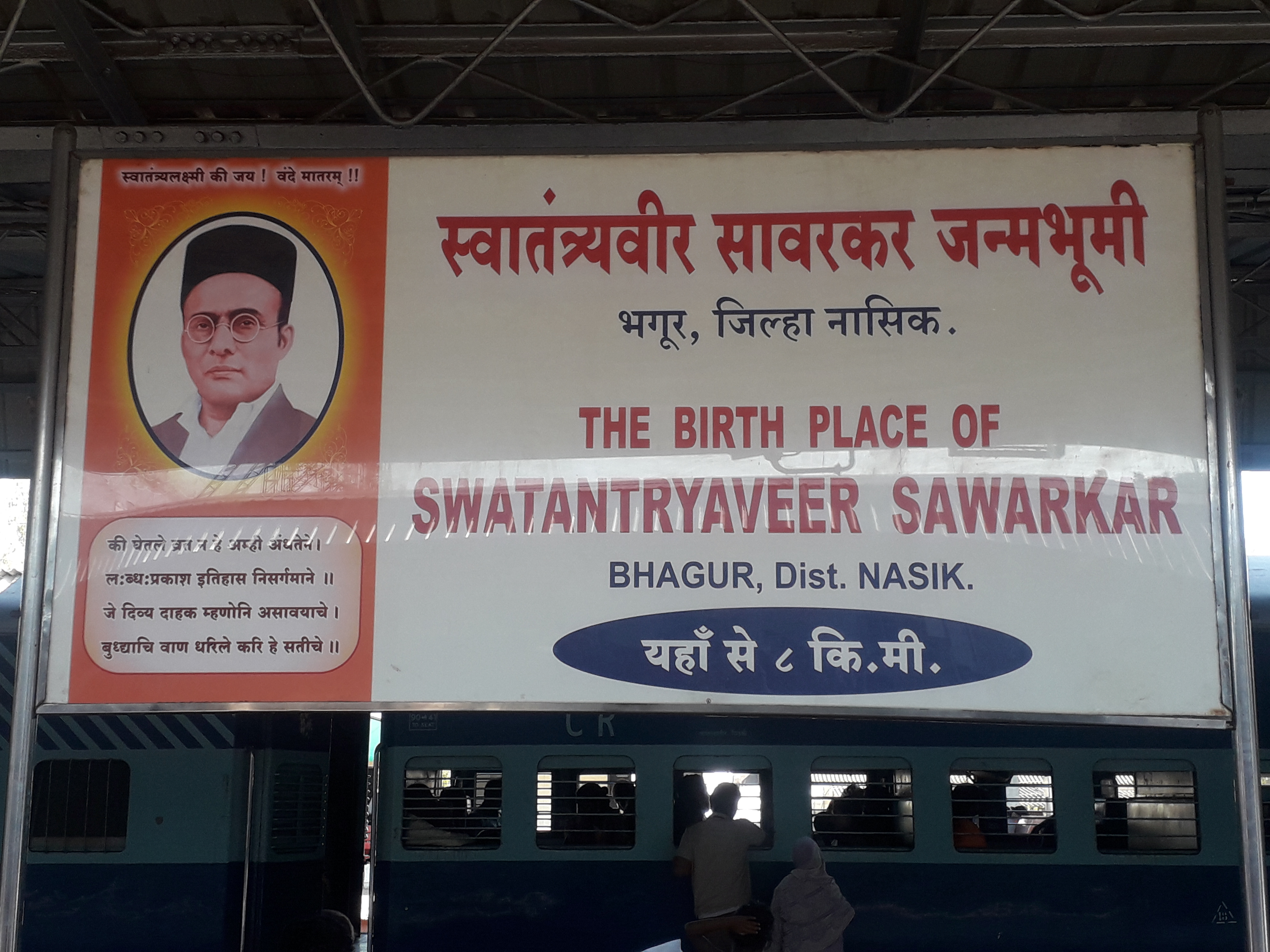
Nasik Road railway station – Information tablet

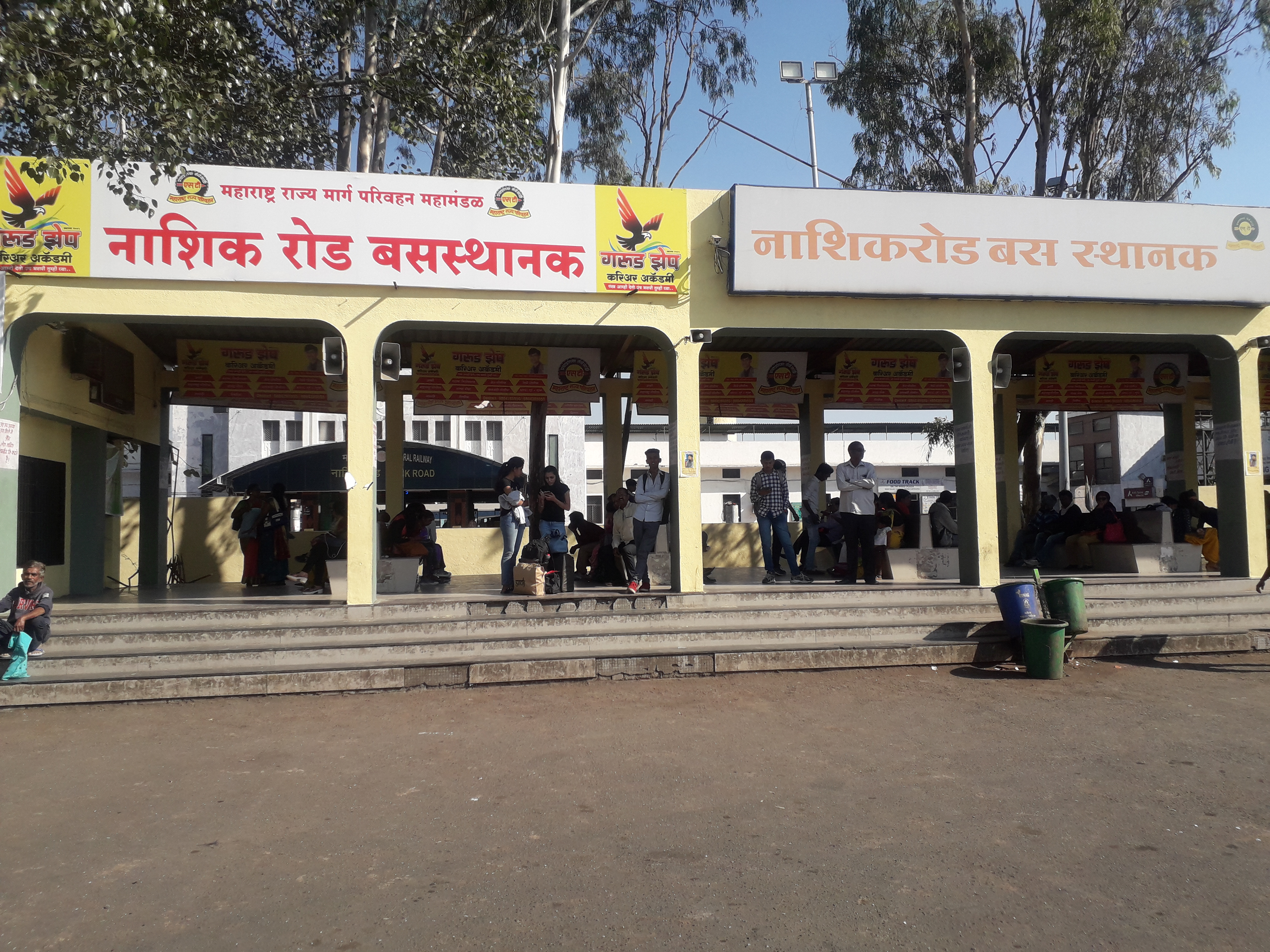
Nasik Road bus depot located just outside Nasik Road railway station
