= Gorakhpur–Bandra Terminus Express (via Barhni) =

Train in India

Overview
- Service type: Express
- First service: 18 December 2016; 9 years ago
- Current operator: Northern Eastern Railway

Route
- Termini: Gorakhpur Junction (GKP); Bandra Terminus (BDTS)
- Stops: 24
- Distance travelled: 1,901.2 km (1,181 mi)
- Average journey time: 38h 35m
- Service frequency: Weekly (Note: Runs one day in a week for every direction.)
- Train number: 15067/15068

On-board services
- Classes: AC 2 tier, AC 3 tier, Sleeper class, General Unreserved
- Seating arrangements: Yes
- Sleeping arrangements: Yes
- Catering facilities: On-board catering E-catering
- Observation facilities: LHB coach
- Entertainment facilities: No
- Baggage facilities: No
- Other facilities: Below the seats

Technical
- Rolling stock: 2
- Track gauge: 1,676 mm (5 ft 6 in)
- Operating speed: 49 km/h (30 mph), including halts

The 15067/15068 Gorakhpur–Bandra Terminus Express is an Express train belonging to North Eastern Railway zone that runs between Gorakhpur Junction and Bandra Terminus in India. It is currently being operated with 15067/15068 train numbers on a weekly basis.

== Service ==
15067/ Gorakhpur–Bandra Terminus Express has an average speed of 50 km/h and covers 1901.2 km in 37h 40m.

The 15068/ Bandra Terminus–Gorakhpur Express has an average speed of 46 km/h and covers 1901.2 km in 41h 15m.

== Route and halts ==
The important halts of the train are:

- Gorakhpur Junction
- Anand Nagar Junction
- Barhini
- Tulsipur
- Gonda Junction
- Lucknow Charbagh NR
- Kanpur Central
- Jhansi Junction
- HabibGanj
- Itarsi Junction
- Bhusaval Junction
- Bhestan
- Borivali
- Bandra Terminus

== Schedule ==
Train number	Station code	Departure station	Departure time	Departure day	Arrival station	Arrival time	Arrival day
15067	GKP	Gorakhpur Junction	05:30 AM	Wed	Bandra Terminus	19:10 PM	Thu
15068	BDTS	Bandra Terminus	00:20 AM	Fri	Gorakhpur Junction	17:35 PM	Sat

== Coach composition ==
The train has standard ICF coach with a max speed of 53 km/h. The train consists of 23 coaches:

- 1 AC II Tier
- 3 AC III Tier
- 9 Sleeper coaches
- 10 Second Class Unreserved
- 2 Seating cum Luggage Rake

== Traction ==
Both trains are hauled by a Locomotive shed, Vadodara or Locomotive shed, Bhusaval-based WAP-4E or WAP-4 electric locomotive from Gorakhpur to Bandra Terminus and vice versa.

== See also ==
- Gorakhpur Junction railway station
- Bandra Terminus
