= Gonda Junction railway station =

Railway station in Uttar Pradesh, India

Gonda Junction
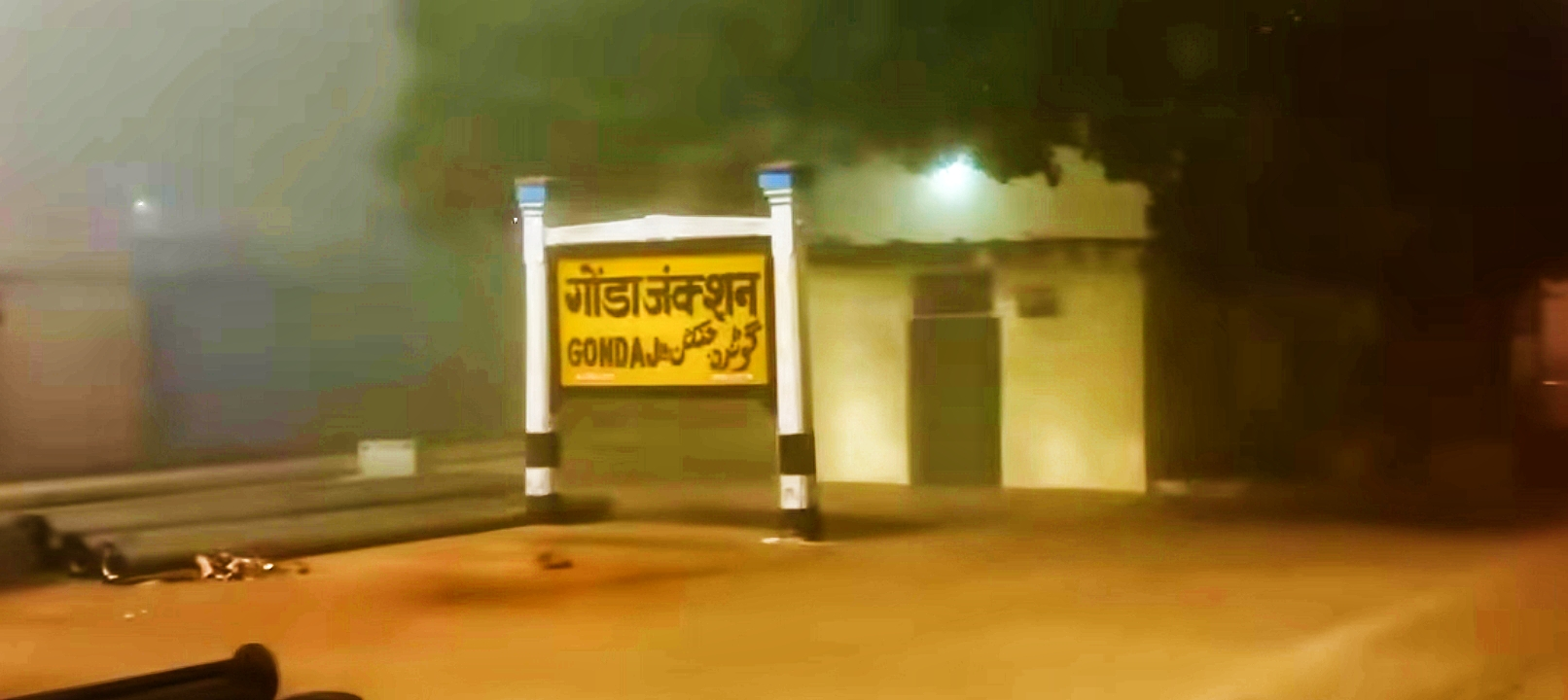
- Gonda Junction

General information
- Location: Gonda, Uttar Pradesh; India
- Coordinates: 27.1543°N 81.9771°E
- Elevation: 107 metres (351 ft)
- System: Indian Railways station
- Owner: Indian Railways
- Operator: North Eastern Railway
- Line: Lucknow–Gorakhpur line
- Platforms: 5
- Tracks: 8
- Connections: Auto stand, Escalator, Elevator

Construction
- Structure type: At grade
- Parking: Yes
- Cycle facilities: Yes

Other information
- Status: Functioning
- Station code: GD
- Zone(s): North Eastern Railway
- Division(s): Lucknow NER
Location
- Location within Uttar Pradesh Location within India

Gonda Junction railway station is a railway station in Devipatan division, Gonda district, Uttar Pradesh. Its code is GD. It serves Gonda city. The station consists of five platforms.

== Diesel Loco Shed, Gonda ==
Loco shed Gonda was established in April 1982 with an initial of 22 WDM locomotives.

Despite being called a Diesel Loco shed, it only houses electric locomotives.

Serial No.	Locomotive Class	Horsepower	Quantity
1.	WAP-7	6350	20
2.	WAG-5	3850	21
3.	WAG-7	5350	80
4.	WAG-9	6120	93
Total Locomotives Active as of February 2026			214
