= Gorakhpur Junction railway station =

Railway station in India

GORAKHPUR JUNCTION

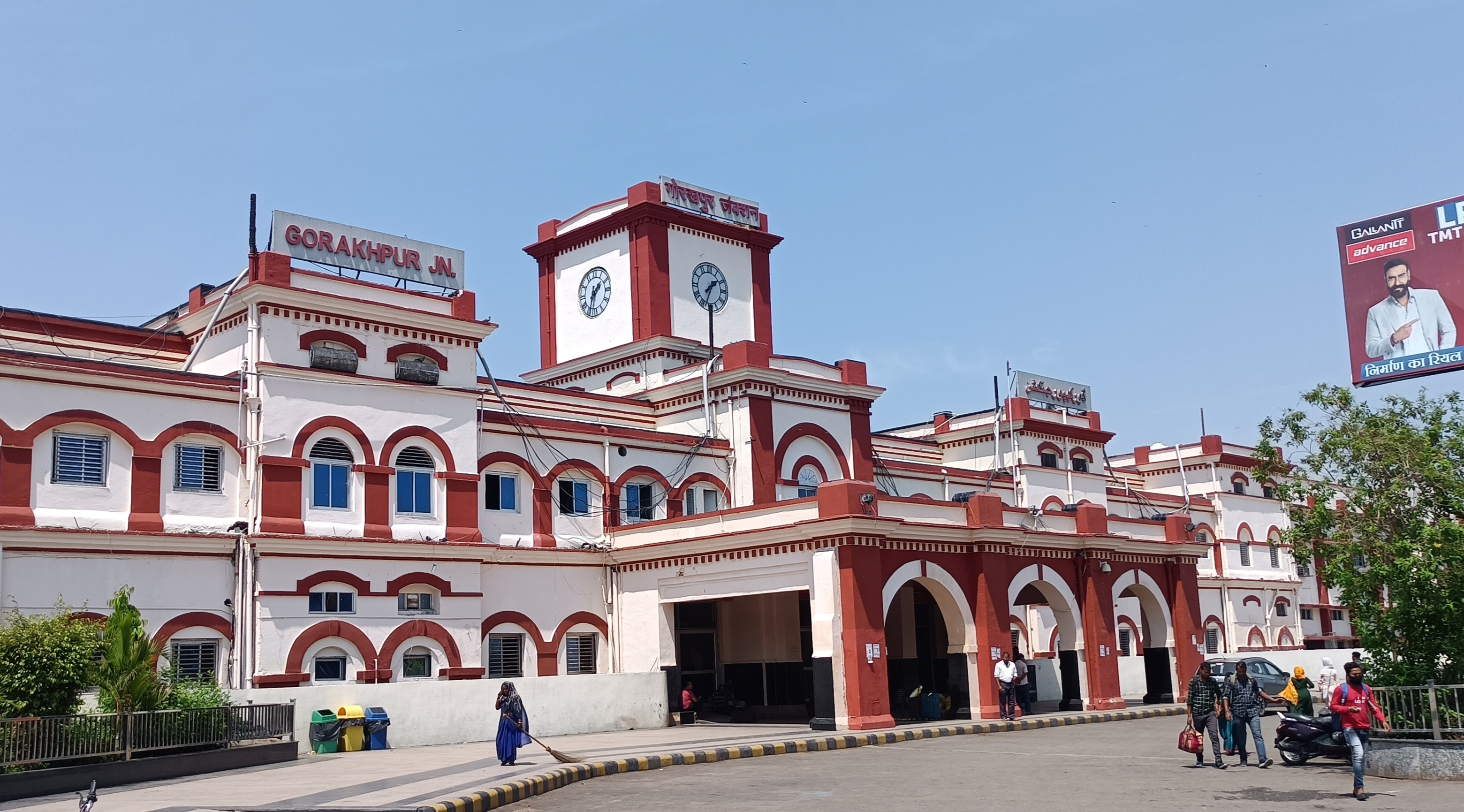
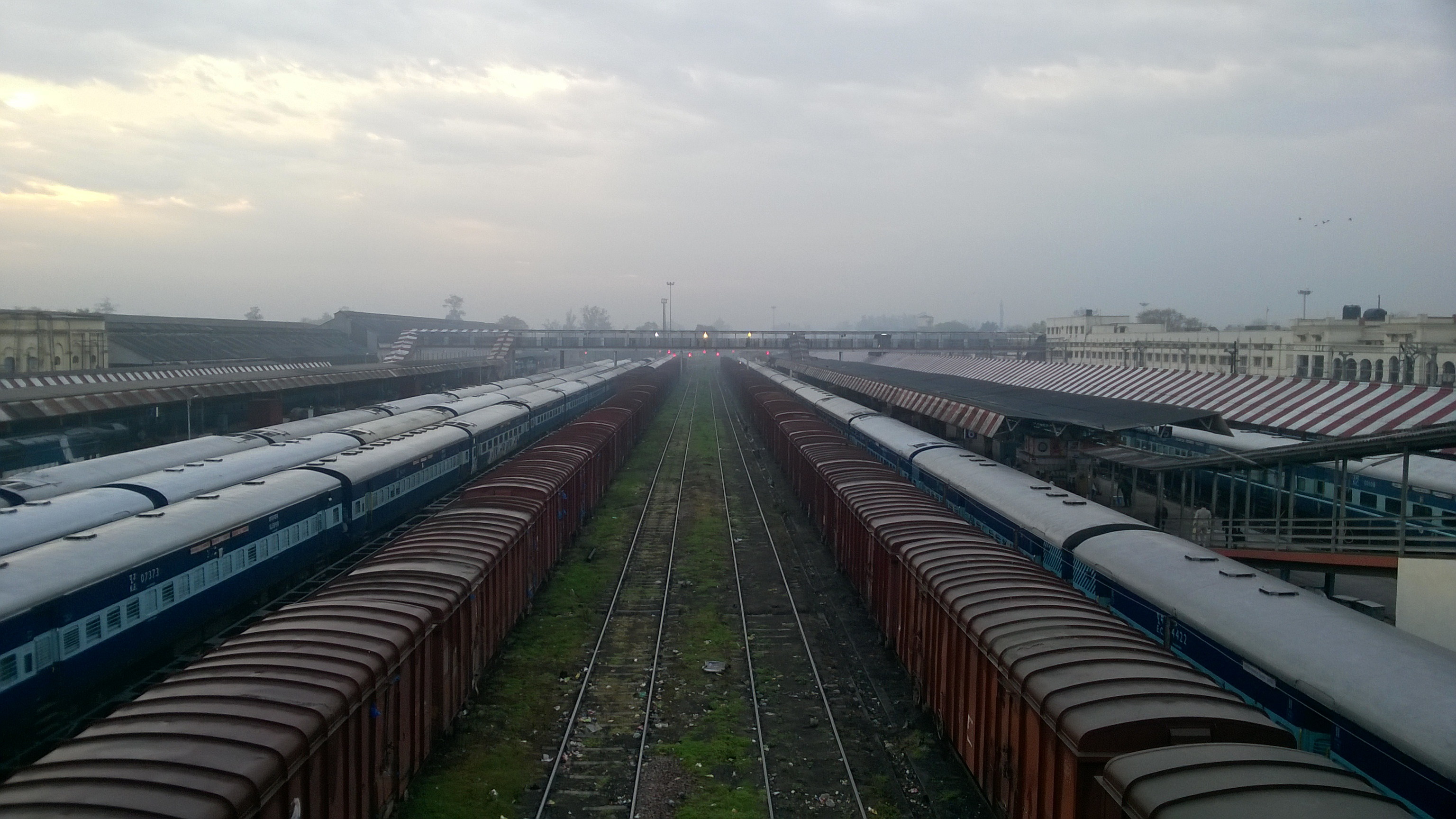
- Gorakhpur Junction Railway Station

General information
- Location: Station road near Dharamshala, Gorakhpur, Uttar Pradesh; India
- Coordinates: 26.7598°N 83.3818°E
- Elevation: 84 metres (276 ft)
- System: Indian Railways Station
- Owner: Indian Railways
- Operator: North Eastern Railway
- Lines: Lucknow–Gorakhpur line; Muzaffarpur–Gorakhpur main line; Barauni–Gorakhpur line; Chhapra–Gorakhpur line
- Platforms: 10 platforms Length– 1,366 m (4,482 ft)
- Tracks: 28
- Connections: Auto stand, Bus stand

Construction
- Structure type: At grade
- Parking: Yes
- Cycle facilities: Yes

Other information
- Status: Functioning
- Station code: GKP
- Zone(s): North Eastern Railway
- Division(s): Lucknow NER

History
- Opened: 1930; 96 years ago

Passengers
- 200,000 per day
Location
- Location within India Location within Uttar Pradesh
- Interactive map of Gorakhpur Junction

Gorakhpur Junction railway station (station code: GKP) is located in the city of Gorakhpur in the Indian state of Uttar Pradesh. It has the world's second longest railway platform after Hubballi Junction railway station in Karnataka. It serves as the headquarters of the North Eastern Railway, part of Indian Railways. The station offers Class A+ railway station facilities.

Gorakhpur Junction railway station is a major railway station in the state of Uttar Pradesh, especially in the Purvanchal region (Eastern Uttar Pradesh). It connects Eastern Uttar Pradesh to Bihar, Nepal, and Northern India to Bihar.

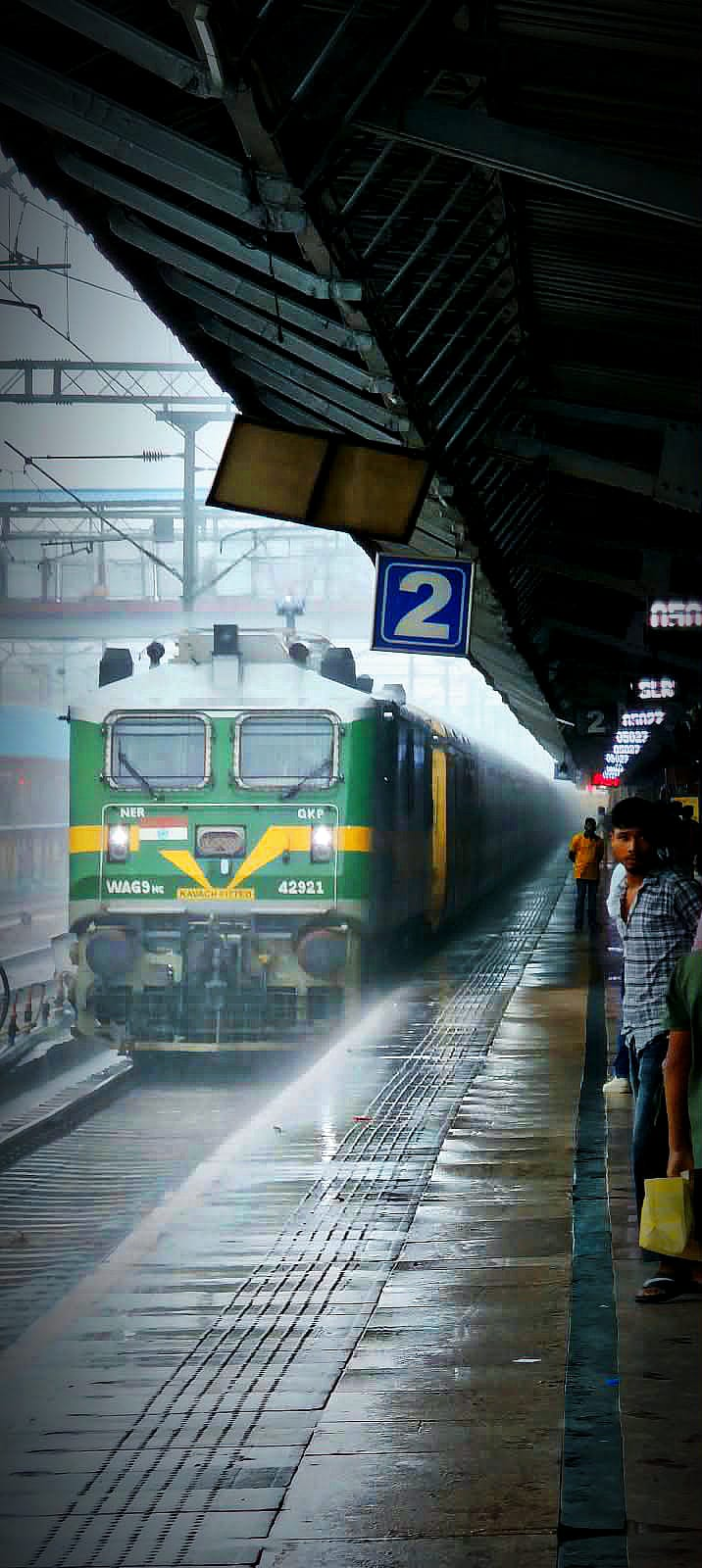
Gorakhpur WAG-9 At Gorakhpur Junction

== History ==
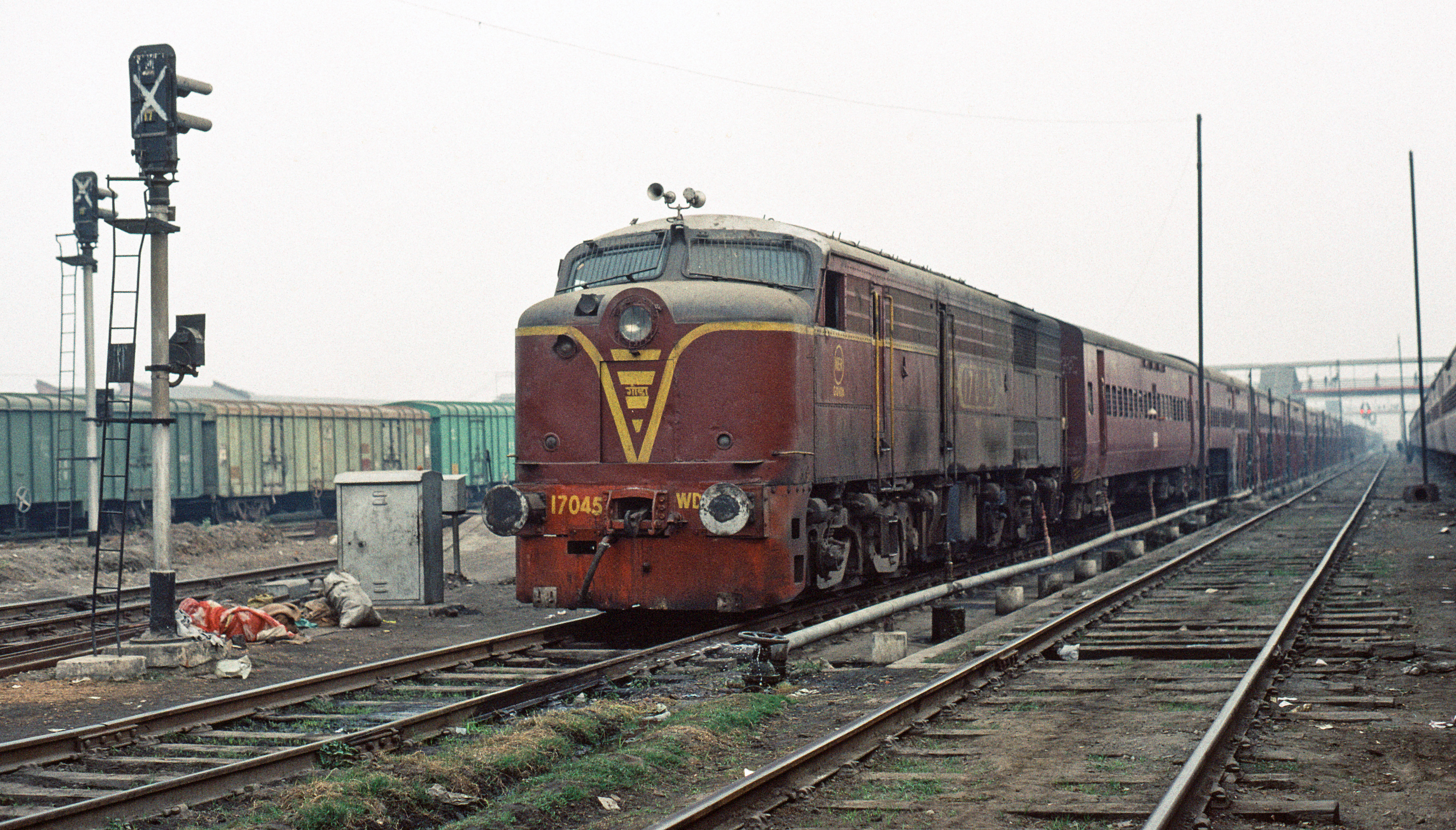
A broad gauge class WDM-1 locomotive with an evening train at Gorakhpur Junction in December 1993

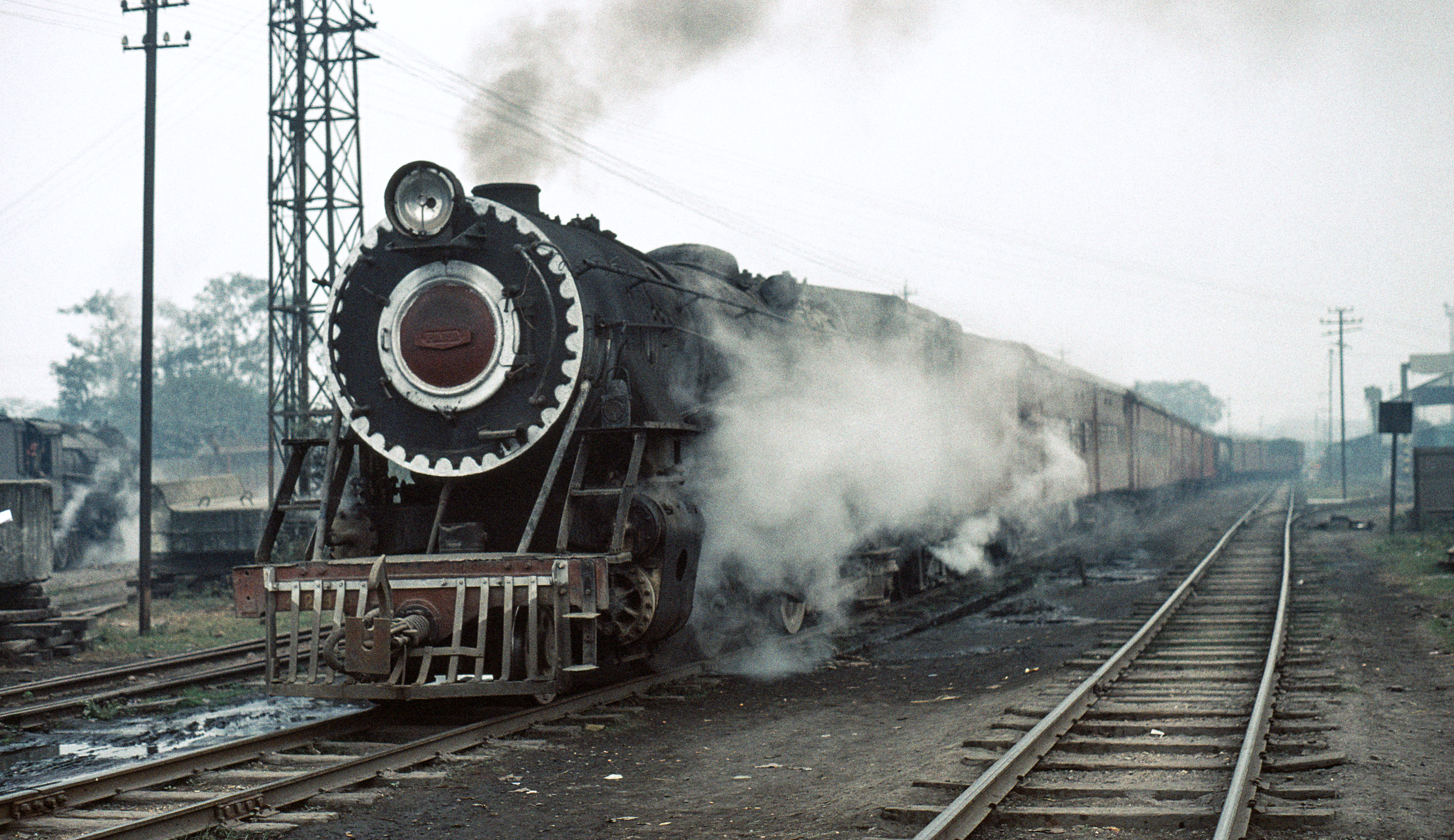
Metre gauge class YG 2-8-2 no. 4288, built by Nippon in 1956, departs from Gorakhpur with an evening train. These locomotives usually carried smoke deflectors

The 135-mile (217 km) metre-gauge Gonda loop, running between Gorakhpur and Gonda, was constructed by the Bengal and North Western Railway between 1886 and 1905. The 79-mile (127 km) Kaptanganj–Siwan metre-gauge line was opened in 1913. The 25-mile (40 km) metre-gauge Nautanwa branch line was opened in 1925.

Conversion to 5 ft 6 in (1,676 mm) broad gauge started with the Gorakhpur–Siwan section in 1981. The Gorakhpur–Paniyahwa section was converted in 1991. The Gorakhpur–Gonda loop was converted around 1985, and the Nautanwa branch line at about the same time. The Kaptanganj–Siwan line was converted around 2011 .

== Electric Loco Shed, Gorakhpur ==
Serial No.	Locomotive Class	Horsepower	Quantity
1.	WAP-4	5350	42
2.	WAP-5	6120	16
3	WAP-7	6350	18
4.	WAG-9	6120	8
Total Locomotives Active as of May 2026			84

== Second longest platform in the world ==
A remodeling of the Gorakhpur railway station was launched in 2009. The remodeling work was completed on a war footing within the scheduled time. With the inauguration of the remodeled yard on 6 October 2013, Gorakhpur has a platform measuring 1,366.33 metres (4,482.7 ft) with ramp and 1,355.40 metres (4,446.9 ft) without it. This is world's second longest railway platform.

== Passenger movement ==
Gorakhpur is amongst the top hundred booking stations of Indian Railways. The station handles 190~ trains daily. On some special occasions the number of trains increases up to 473. Some of the other railway stations in Uttar Pradesh handling large numbers of passengers are Kanpur Central, Varanasi Junction, Mathura Junction and Pandit Deen Dayal Upadhyaya Junction.
