= Hallaur =

- Town of Siddharthnagar
- Location in Uttar Pradesh, India Hallaur (India)
- Coordinates: 27.1727°N 82.6505°E
- Country: India
- State: Uttar Pradesh
- District: Siddharthnagar

Area
  - Total: 2 km^{2} (0.77 sq mi)

Population (2011)
  - Total: 6,999
  - Density: 3,500/km^{2} (9,100/sq mi)

Languages
  - Official: Hindi, Awadhi, Urdu
- Time zone: UTC+5:30 (IST)
- PIN: 272191
- Website: sidharthnagar.nic.in

Hallaur or Hallor village is located in Domariyaganj Tehsil of Siddharthnagar district in Uttar Pradesh, India. Domariyaganj is the nearest town to Hallaur village.

The name was derived from Chapter Hal-ata (Al-Insan) of the Quran by Meer Syed Shah Abdur Rasool (Meera Baba). It has a maternity home run by the state government. Bhatangwan village was merged into Hallaur and became a de facto part of Hallaur.

It is 44 kilometres southwest of Siddharthnagar district and 49 kilometres north of Basti district headquarters, neighbouring Domariaganj its headquarters.

== History ==
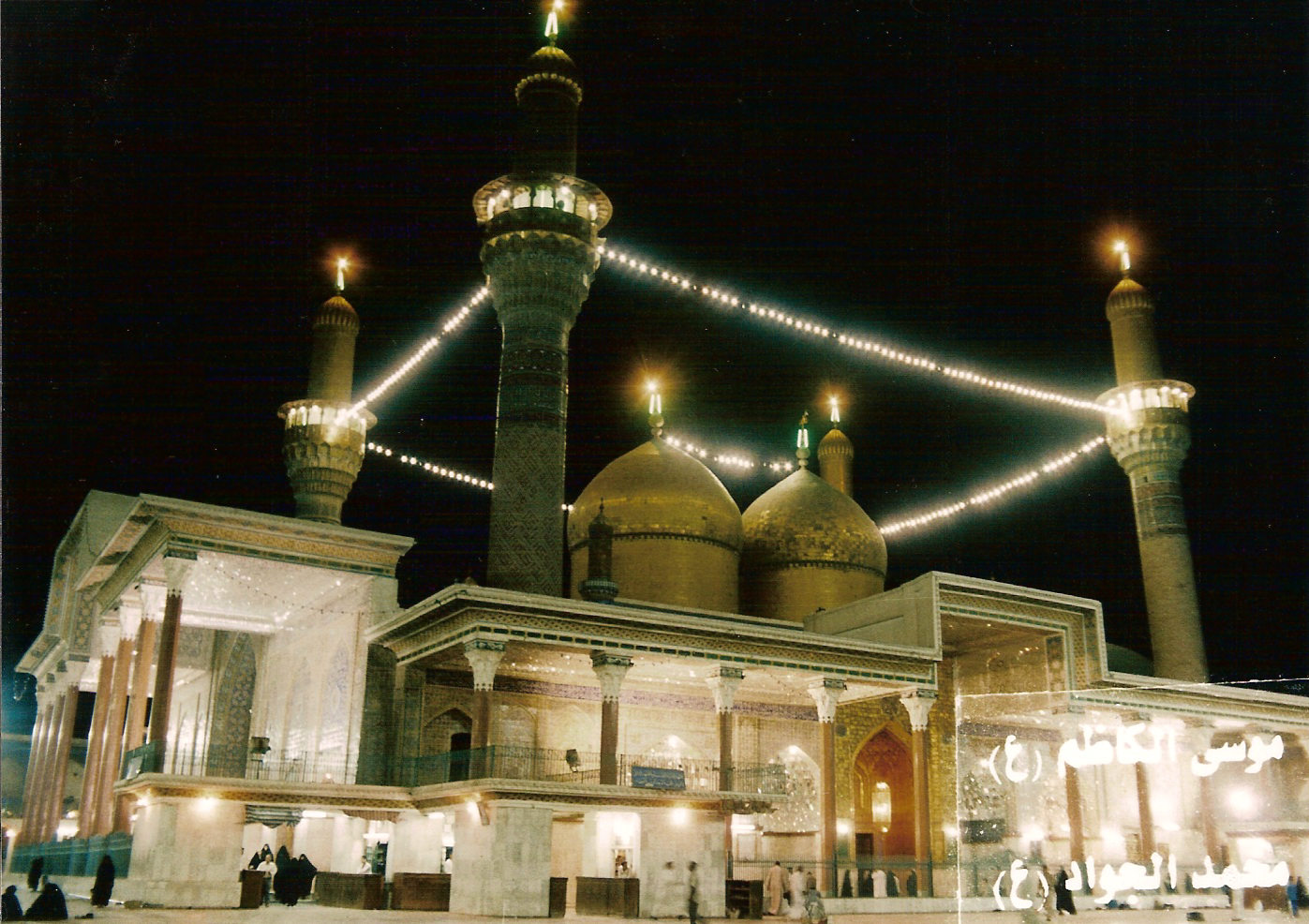
Al Kadhimiya Mosque where Imam Musa al-Kazim & Imam Mohammad al-Taqi al Jawwad are buried in Iraq

As per historical evidence some 335 years ago (during the reign of the Mughal Emperor Aurangzeb), a noble and small family of Sayyids, led by Shah Sayyid Abdur Rasool along with his family migrated from the Persian City of Toos to India during the Mughal period. Shah Syed Abdur Rasool later came to be known as "Meera Baba". He was a devout Twelver Shiite.In fact ancestors of more than 20% of present sadaat population was migrated from nearby villages such as Pandri, Sisai, Bhuigaawan, Pokhra, Bangawaan and Pipra during the past 250 years. Some migrated even 50 to 60 years ago. Meera Baba's tomb is in the heartland of Hallaur and old natives of Hallaur who are descendants of Meera Baba and his brothers revere him a lot. Every year urs of Meera Baba is commemorated and attended by huge number of people. A huge gathering pay their homage and recite verses of the Quran at his tomb daily especially on every Thursday. As per historical evidences Mughal Emperor Alamgir II visited Hallaur and was so impressed by Meera Baba's charms and divine power that he gifted five villages to Meera Baba. Shah Abdur Rasool Trust is still functional in Hallaur. The trust is responsible for maintenance of Bada Imambargah, maintenance of tomb of Meera Baba, organising anniversaries, etc. Day of Ashura procession on 10th Moharram, mourning procession of 7th Moharram and similar other processions are organised by the trust (Waqf) round the year from the grants released by Shia Central Waqf Board in favour of Waqf Shah Alamgir II.The present trustee is Janab Naushad Haider Rizvi, Advocate.

It has been said by the local Hallauris that Meer Shah Abdur Rasool faced hard-hitting confrontation from the tribal settled in Hallaur who were known as "Tharus". The Tharus asked Meera Baba to prove himself being a true Syed and show some miracles commensurate with their magical performances. Meera Baba once brushing his teeth with a Reetha stick sowed the same in the land within the premises of today's Jama Masjid of Hallaur. Within few days a sapling emerged. The whole Tharu community became his followers and most of them embraced Islam. That miraculous tree is still alive at the entrance of Jama Masjid. Hallauris keep the leaves of that tree as trophy. All Hallauris believe that as long as Meera Baba is in Hallaur, this a secured place. This area was named Hallaur either by Meera Baba or by his brothers. It is a prominent place near Domariaganj in the District of Siddharthnagar of Uttar Pradesh in India. Generally, the natives of this area are small landlords and agriculturists by profession. Soon, they realized the importance of education and as such presently they can be found in. Generally, they visit Hallaur on few occasions such as Muharram. Hallaur was actively involved in first war of Indian Independence. Begum Hazrat Mahal of Awadh took refuge on her way towards Nepal when she was being chased by British Army. Her small contingent was safely helped and guided by Shah Kabeer Ali under the leadership of Meer Muhammad Bakhsk. The British Army punished the Hallauris for this.

No murder or any other heinous crime has yet occurred in Hallaur.

== Demographics ==
As per the census held in India in 2001, Hallaur has a population of approximately 25,000 people, 50:50 men to women. However, after amalgamation of neighbouring Bhatangwa village with that of Hallaur, now Bhatangwa is part of Hallaur and with that Hallaur has an estimated total population of approximately 18,000 to 20,000 people including those of the adjoining areas. Residents of Hallaur are referred as Hallauris. Most of the Hallauris practice the Shia Islam religion with considerable population of other faiths such as Sunni Muslims, Hindus, Buddhists and a dozen Christians. Christians also have their missionary School and Hospital named as St. Thomas on Highway No. 26 of Hallaur.

Most of the Hallauri Muslims are Twelver Shiites. Around 85% of entire population is Muslim out of which more than 90% Shiites are from the Syed families, they are predominantly devout Shias. The remaining 15% of population has Buddhists and, Hindus and Christian population.

The Hindus settled in Hallaur have decades old history. They were given land by Syed landlords to settle down with their families in Hallaur. A separate locality of Dalits still exists in Hallaur on the land provided by Syeds. They have a good rapport with the other communities of hallaur.

== Education and literacy ==
The literacy rate amongst the people is considerably higher than other people living in surrounding area. Due to unemployment, people of this town are compelled to work in metropolitan cities, the Middle East and other countries for their living. A substantial number of people work in the government sector.

Religious educational institute like Madrasas was established by the Late Alhaj Syed Ali Hasan Rizvi (Tehsildar Sb) and is running successfully. The Modern school was established by late Qazi Adeel Abbasi, the late Hashmat Ali, the late Ghalib Husain, the late Mohd Iliyas, the late Samar Hallauri, the late Mohammad Husain (Nanhey baba), the late Lutf Haider, the late Itait Husain, the late Dr Nazeer Hasan (Moti doctor) and the late Sultan Ahmad in 1952. The district board also runs four schools (including two for girls) and three primary schools. There are some privately run schools also in Hallaur. Makhtab and Madrasas are the preferred sources of religious education for all preferably for women. Fine arts, craft and composition of Urdu poetry are major hobbies of native Hallauris. Hallaur has hosted All India Shia Conference which was attended by important religious leaders and also hosted the executive body meeting of "Anjuman Wazeefa Sadaat wa Momineen."

== Culture and religion ==
Hallauri are influenced by Persian as well as Indian culture. The language used by them is unique too. Being a Shiite-dominated town, Hallaur is becoming a Shiite center of eastern Uttar Pradesh because of its sizable population of Shia Muslims. A huge gathering can be seen during the month of Moharram. The theologian from Saran district of (Bihar) state of India "Allamah Sayyid Sa'id Akhtar Rizvi” who actively promoted Islam in East Africa and wrote number of books on Shiite theology and jurisprudence had served as Imam of Jama Masjid of Hallaur in his early days (1948–51). The late Haider Mahdi who was also a good orator. Itrat Hallauri, Qais Hallauri and Allamah Samar Hallauri are two poets from the region. Khurshid Hallauri and Jamal Hallauri are known for their classic poetry. Mayal Hallauri and Baqar Hallauri, teachers by profession, were also local poets. Sada-e-Dil [Voice of the Heart] was the epic which was composed and recited by Samar Hallauri on the opening day of All India Shia Conference (AISC). Upon him was conferred the title of 'Allamah' by AISC presided by 'Maulana Kalbe Abbas' the 'Fakhr-e-Qaum. More than three quarters of the population of this place is scattered throughout the world and other places like Mumbai, Lucknow, Delhi, Aligarh, Bangalore, Pune and Gorakhpur. However, most of the immigrants of this town are well connected to their roots as they frequently visit their motherland especially during the month of Moharram. A monthly Hindi magazine 'Dost Ki Baat' edited by Nafees Haider Hallauri and a newspaper named Hallaur Sandesh edited by Roshan Rizvi, another newspaper 'Watchman', edited by Helal Haider Rizvi also give glimpses of Hallauri thoughts and culture. Badshah Husain Rizvi contributed in Hindi literature. 'Parivartan' a Hindi magazine was a good effort of Sultan Ahmad Rizvi and his brothers. Jamaali Sahab has also written several Urdu novels which were published with the assistance of UP Urdu Academy. Presently, much work is being done by Dr Wazahat Rizvi in respect of Urdu literature. At the cultural level, Sultan Ahmad Rizvi and his brothers established 'AAG' (Armature Artist Guild) which has done commendable work in the field of Art, Drama and Theater. Mr. Hasan Abbas Rizvi ex. program executive All India Radio has contributed much in the field of radio drama. He had written, directed and played main character of Bhola, which was immensely popular, in very popular radio drama series Jharokha highlighting social problems, broadcast for more than 10 years continuously in eighties from Gorakhpur center of All India radio. District-level representation of the Indian People's Theatre Association (IPTA) was also representation of Hallaur, position of district secretary & president was with Adv. Manzar Rizvi and Khurshid Ahmad (R.K) respectively. Anwar Abbas Rizvi residing in Gorakhpur also contributed in the field of radio and TV. Hallauris are a unique community and most of them have the same resemblance. "Anjuman Farogh Matam" [Green Party] and "Anjuman Guldasta Matam" [Black Party] are the registered organisations behind all religious activities of Hallauris. "Anjuman Urooj Matam" is the youth wing of Farogh Matam and "Anjuman Ghuncha Matam" is the youth wing of Guldasta Matam. Every Hallauri is either affiliated to Farogh Matam or Guldasta Matam. Unlimited religious activities are performed by both parties round the year. Locally, Farogh Matam is named as Hari [Green] Party whereas Guldasta Matam is nicknamed as Kali/Safed [Black] (Ujari)Party. Almost every religious scholar of the country has visited Hallaur once or more to participate in Majlises organised by Farogh Matam and Guldasta Matam since almost last 100 years. AL Haj Ahmad Raza Rizvi who has delivered taqreer (majlis after tadfeen-e-Tazia) at Karbala Hallaur on the day of Ashura continuously for 56 years, Maulana Hasan Abbas Fitrat, Maulana Syed Ilmul Hasan Rizvi, Maulana Syed Zawar Hussain Rizvi, Maulana Chand, Alhaj Tafseer Hasan, Maulana Lakhte jigar, Jamal Haider, Qaiser Abbas, Khushter Abbas, Er. Mehdi Abbas and Er. Aftab Haider and many other religious scholars of Hallauri origin are doing/have done their level best to propagate Islam in different parts of India and world. "Anjuman Yadgare Husaini" is the mother Anjuman of all Anjumans. The late Ali Hasan Tehsildar was the person who had institutionalised and streamlined the activities of this Anjuman and was instrumental in making it financially strong. Karbala of Hallaur is a major place of mourning for Imam Husain ibn Ali. Earlier it was only for burial of Taziya and few other occasional events but in recent past Karbala has emerged as an important place of worship and social gatherings. A Mosque-cum-Imambargah was constructed by the late Er. Sayyid Badrul Hasan in the premises of Karbala (later he constructed another Imambargah in old Karbala). Much construction has continued since then. Several shrines were recently constructed and several are underway.

Shrines so far constructed in Karbala premises of Hallaur are as follows:

- Shrine of Imam Ali ibn Abi Talib
- Shrine of Syedah Zainab bint Ali
- Shrine of Imam Zayn al-Abidin Al-Sajjad
- Shrine of Imam Ali al Reza.

Shrines planned to be constructed in Karbala premises of Hallaur as of March 2010:

- The Shrine of Syedah Fatimah Zahra daughter of Muhammad.
- The Shrine of Abbas ibn Ali, already a Dargah in name of Bab ul Hawaej Abbas ibn Ali exists in Hallaur.
- The Shrine of Syedah Sakinah bint Husayn, already a small Imambargah exists in name of Sakinah Bint al Husain within Hallaur.
- The Shrine of Ali Asghar Ibn Husayn, constructed recently at Babulganj Muhallah.

== Azadari and other religious observances ==
Azadari in Hallaur is known all over India, it's done with great fervor. The practice of not cooking food at home on the day of Ashura is still prevalent in Hallaur. People abstain from cooking at home only if someone dies within their family, and that day they are provided with meal by their neighbours or near relatives. This is done ever year on the day of Ashura, people cook meals at their homes for their neighbours and then share each other. Taziya procession on the day of Ashura is carried out with much devotion in Hallaur. Hallaur has a history of Azadari which is done in great zeal. The Main religious activities of Azadari started from very first night of the month of Muharram until its end after two months and eight days, apart all other Mourning Days related to Masoomeen,

From First Night after sighting the Moon of Muharram, Majlis started and it continues on place to place and house to house following a time table from early in the morning until midnight. After midnight many SHAB E BEDARI (All Night Azadari) has been organised by many Anjumans each day all during two months and eight days. On the seventh and eighth days of Muharram, a Juloos is organized by both Farogh Matam and Guldista Matam separately which joins each other at Main Hallaur Fourway, it starts early in the morning and end late in night in Karbala of Hallaur Marching and mourning almost all houses and Shrines and Imambargah of Hallaur as well as in the night of the seventh Muharram JULOOS E MEHDI in memory of Qasim ibn Hasan and on the eighth night Juloos e Taboot in memory of Ali Akber Ibn Husayn is observed all night. Also, on the eighth Night of Muharram, in the Shrine / Dargah of Abbas ibn Ali a majlis was addressed followed by Matam and Alam. On tenth day of Muharram, the Day of Ashura a large Juloos is observed every year along With replicas of many religious signs like Alam and Zuljanah. This is followed by Matam, NAUHA, Qamazani and Zanjeerzani. In the night of Tenth Muharram, Sham e Ghareeban was mourned by local people in three major majlises which are

- Majlis e Sham e Ghareeba organized at Dargah Duwara
- Majliz e Sham e Ghareeba organized at Imambargah of Shafayat Husain Sahib
- Majlis e Sham e Ghareeba at the House of Barkat Husain Sahib T.T.

Taziya processions apart from day of Ashura are also carried out by Shiites on the following days:

- Day of Arbaeen also known as Chehlum in Hallaur falls 40 days after the day of Ashura.
- 25th of Moharram in commemoration of fourth Shiite Imam Ali ibnil Husain Zayn al-Abidin.
- 9th of Zil Hijjah in commemoration of martyrdom of Muslim ibn Aqeel cousin of Imam Husain ibn Ali who was captured and martyred in Kufa on this day.
- 28th of Safar in commemoration of Muhammad's Death and Martyrdom of second Shiite Imam Hasan ibn Ali on same day.
- Chup Tazia on 8th of Rabi'-ul-Awwal in commemoration of martyrdom of eleventh Shiite Imam Hasan al Askari
- 28th of Rajab in memory of Imam Husain ibn Ali's last day in Medina before he headed towards Karbala.

Qama-Zani, Zanjeer Zani and Matam on Fire are also done in Hallaur. Most of the Hallauris are in Taqlid of Grand Ayatollah Ali al-Sistani. Zainab bint Ali Day organised by Abbas brothers, Abbas Day organised by Alam brothers and Mahfile Noor organised by Farogh Matam are held every year with much devotion. Around four decades earlier, the late Nafis Ahmad Rizvi Advocate started a programme named Sham-e-Ghariban and this programme became highly acclaimed. Now this programme is carried out by Zakir-e-Ahlebayte Khushtar Abbas Rizvi.

Imambargahs in Hallaur are the places which contribute to the cause of mourning of Imam Husain ibn Ali and these are centres of religious gatherings in Moharram. A big new Imambargah is under construction in the vicinity of Hallaur bazaar. Besides Jama Masjid there are five mosques of the Shia community and one of the Sunni community.

List of Imambargahs in Hallaur:

- Imambargah Waqf Shah Alamgir II also known as Bada Imambargah constructed on the land gifted by Shah Alamgir II
- Imambaargaah Babul Baba
- Imambaargaah Seth Baba
- Dargah Bab ul Hawaej Abbas ibn Ali (Pachchon [West] Imambargah)
- Imambaargaah Nirmalain Bua
- Imambaargaah of Shafayat Husain Sahib Tehseeldar, nowadays known as Hussainyah Ali Hasan
- Imambaargaah of Karbala constructed by Er S.B.Hasan
- Imambaargaah Faham Hallauri
- Jannat al Baqi Imambargah in memory of demolished shrines in Jannat al Baqi, Saudi Arabia.
- Imam baargaah Abu Naadir
- Imam Bargaah Rajjab Ali

In addition, many families have earmarked some place within their houses as Imam Baargaah

The Shiva temple of Hallaur is an holy place of worship for Hindus. A fair on the occasion of Maha Shivratri is held every year with huge gathering of Hindus coming from far off to attend the fair. Hallaur also has a Hindu temple named as Kali Mandir. The land for Shivalaya, Seeta Garahiya and Kali Mandir was donated by Hallauri Landlord Syed Mohammad Haider son of late Shabbir Hasan with the consent of his grandfather, the late Hashmat Ali Numberdar.

== Jama Masjid and managing committee ==
A Central 'Jama Masjid' was constructed adjacent to the dwelling place of Shah Saiyyad Abdur Rasool almost three and half centuries ago. This was rebuilt in the 1930s. This mosque has, since then, been reconstructed, expanded and repaired from time to time with locally available resources, techniques and materials. This was again reconstructed as a grand mosque in the year 2016 applying new design and modern technique, And This newly built mosque was inaugurated by the imam of Friday and Jamaat Maulana Syed Waseem Raza Zaidi Sahib Qibla (imam juma wl jama'at from 2009 to 2019) And the first congregational prayer was also taught under his leadership. Jama Masjid is a centrally managed mosque, it is also the biggest mosque of Hallaur and organises the weekly Friday Congregational prayer along with the mandatory daily prayers.

The Jama Masjid's managing committee known as "Anjuman-e-Yadgar-e-Hussaini" looks after all affairs and management of the mosque, community Graveyards, Madrasas and Makhtab (imparting religious and modern education). "Anjuman-e-Yadgar-e-Hussaini" is one of the oldest registered religious organisations of Hallaur. The present Imam of the Jama Masjid is 'Hujjatul Islam Maulana syed Mohammad Hasan' from Akbarpur District. Considered as the mother organisation of all organisations in Hallaur "Anjuman-e-Yadgar-e-Hussaini" is actively involved in organising various religious activities in Hallaur. The notable tomb of Shah Abdur Rasool and graves of his family members and his miraculous Reetha tree are also within the premises of Jama Masjid.

== Hallauris outside Hallaur and their religious activities ==
Mumbai is believed to be having the largest Hallauri population outside Hallaur followed by Lucknow and Gorakhpur respectively. The majority of Hallauris live in clusters in Govandi and other areas of Mumbai like Andheri, Mira Road, Mumbra, Bandra, Kurla and Navi Mumbai and almost every country in the Persian Gulf. In addition, Hallauri have registered their presence in the US, Canada, United Kingdom, Africa, Germany, Japan and many other countries. Anjuman Haideri Hallaur is active in Mumbai, Lucknow, Delhi, Aligarh and Gorakhpur and Kanpur. Hallaur Association in Gorakhpur is a social-cum-religious platform of Hallauris residing in Gorakhpur. It organises a mourning procession of fifth Muharram every year. Religious activities are being organised in Delhi and Lucknow, too.

Hallauris are and were always independent, all cultural and religious functions are organized by donations received from members. ImamBargah –e- Haidery Hallaur, a Masjid cum Imam Bargah is built by Hallauris in Govandi. This Anjuman has a programme in the month of Safar, a Juloos where 72 Tabuts [Coffins] are carried by the mourners of the Martyrs of Karbala. In addition a religious "IDAARA" was founded by Er S.B. Hasan in Andheri West. It is being used for salaat, azaadari and other religious activities.

Hallaur is also known as the Azadari planet.

== See also ==
- Begum Hazrat Mahal
- Musa al Mubaraqqa
- Razavi Khurasan
- Rizvi
- Shia Islam in India
- Wasa Dargah
