= Chaukhara =

- Town
- Nickname: Chaukhara Estate
- Location in India Chaukhara (Uttar Pradesh)
- Coordinates: 27°14′45.7″N 82°39′29.5″E
- Country: India
- State: Uttar Pradesh
- District: Siddharth Nagar
- Establishment: 1554 AD
- Founder: Maharaja Bhring Shah (Eldest Son of Shri Maháráj Rájadhiraj Achal Narain Singh ji of Khurasa, now Gonda)

Government
  - MP: Jagdambika Pal (BJP)
  - MLA: Saiyada Khatoon (SP)
- Elevation: 110 m (360 ft)

Population (2011)
  - Total: 4,190

Languages
  - Official: Hindi
- Time zone: UTC+5:30 (IST)
- Pin Code: 272193
- Telephone: 5544
- Vehicle registration: UP-55-XXXX

Chaukhara is a town and nagar panchayat in Domariaganj tehsil of Siddharthnagar district in the state of Uttar Pradesh, India.

== Geography ==
Chaukhara is located at 27°14′45.7″N 82°39′29.5″E, with an average elevation of 110 meters (360 feet). Situated in the swampy region of northeastern Uttar Pradesh, Chaukhara lies ten miles from the Nepal border. It is 5 kilometers from the tehsil headquarters at Domariaganj, 60 kilometers from the district headquarters at Siddharth Nagar, and 30 kilometers from the Nepal border. Nestled in the plains between the Budhi Rapti River to the north and the Rapti River to the south, Chaukhara enjoys a moderate climate with average rainfall of approximately 50 inches. However, its location in the plains between two rivers makes it susceptible to recurrent flooding. The total cultivated area in the village is 711.6 acres, with approximately one-third dedicated to single-crop cultivation.
