= Raghvendra =

- Raghvendra Singh, Indian lyricist
- Raghvendra Pratap Singh (Bihar politician), Indian politician
- Raghvendra Pratap Singh (Uttar Pradesh politician), Indian politician
- Raghvendra Singh Chauhan, Indian judge
- 23844 Raghvendra, a planet
