= Qadirabad, Siddharthnagar district =

Qadirabad is a village in Domariaganj, Uttar Pradesh, India.The name 'Qadirabad' comes from the name of Malik Qadir Hussain . Taiyyaba Khatoon is the pardhan of qadirabad. Qadirabad is a village located near Rapti River in tehsil Dumariyaganj in District Siddharth Nagar. Indian Postal Code System Consists of Six digits. The first to digits represent the state, the second two digits represent the district and the Third two digits represents the Post Office.In this case the first two digits 27 represents the state Uttar Pradesh, the second two digits 21 represent the district Siddharthnagar, and finally 89 represents the Post Office Quadirabad B.O. Thus the Zip Code of Quadirabad B.O, Siddharthnagar, uttar pradesh is 272189
