= Agasanur =

- village
- Location in Karnataka, India Agasanur (India)
- Coordinates: 15°40′24″N 77°03′30″E
- Country: India
- State: Karnataka
- District: Bellary
- Talukas: Siruguppa

Government
  - Body: Village Panchayat

Languages
  - Official: Kannada
- Time zone: UTC+5:30 (IST)
- PIN: 583114
- ISO 3166 code: IN-KA
- Vehicle registration: KA
- Nearest city: Bellary
- Civic agency: Village Panchayat
- Website: karnataka.gov.in

Agasanuru is a village in the southern state of Karnataka, India. It is located in the Siruguppa taluk of Bellary district in Karnataka.

Located in the border area of North-Karnataka, this village is known for its Moharram festival which is celebrated by both Muslims and Hindus.

== See also ==
- Bellary
- Districts of Karnataka
