= Ram Shankar Lal =

Member of Parliament, Lok Sabha
- In office 1957-1962
- Preceded by: Keshav Dev Malviya
- Succeeded by: Kripa Shanker
- Constituency: Domariyaganj, Uttar Pradesh

Personal details
- Born: 1 July 1902 Maghar, United Provinces, British India (present-day Uttar Pradesh, India)
- Party: Indian National Congress
- Spouse: Shyam Sundari Devi

Ram Shankar Lal was an Indian politician. He was elected to the Lok Sabha, the lower house of the Parliament of India from Domariyaganj, Uttar Pradesh as a member of the Indian National Congress.
