= Bharariya =

Village in Uttar Pradesh, India

Coordinates: 24°51′N 81°13′E

Bharariya is a village in Domariaganj, Uttar Pradesh, India.
