= Bitharia =

Bitharia is a village in Domariaganj, Uttar Pradesh, India.
