= Prabhudayal Vidyarthi =

Indian politician and freedom fighter

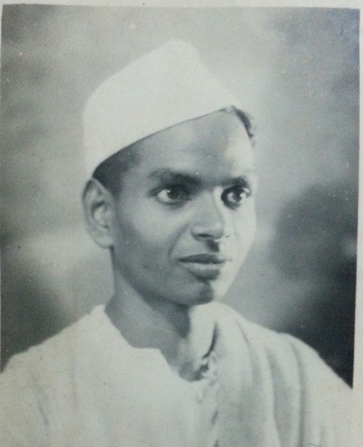
- Freedom fighter and politician Prabhudayal Vidyarthi

Member of the Uttar Pradesh Legislative Assembly
- In office 1952–1962
- Preceded by: Office established
- Succeeded by: Madhav Prasad Tripathi
- Constituency: Basti (later Bansi Assembly constituency

Personal details
- Born: 1925 Jogiya Udaipur, United Provinces of Agra and Oudh (British Raj) British India
- Died: 7 September 1977 (aged 51–52) Lucknow, Uttar Pradesh, India
- Citizenship: British India (1925–1947); Dominion of India (1947–1950); Republic of India (1950–1977)
- Party: Indian National Congress
- Spouse(s): Kamla Sahni (Ex-MLA, Uttar Pradesh)
- Children: Two daughters
- Education: Sevagram Ashram
- Known for: Indian Independence Movement, Quit India Movement, "Purvanchal ke Gandhi"

Prabhudayal Vidyarthi (1925 – 7 September 1977) was an Indian freedom fighter, Gandhian social worker, politician, and writer. Seeking Freedom at age 8, he joined the Congress in 1932 at Allahabad. Popularly known as Purvanchal ke Gandhi, he served as a Member of the Uttar Pradesh Legislative Assembly from 1952 to 1962.

== Early life and education ==
Vidyarthi was born in 1925 in Jogiya Udaipur village, located in the present-day Siddharthnagar district of Uttar Pradesh. At age 10, in 1935, he heard Thakkar Bapa's public address speaking of Mahatma Gandhi's quest for a "FREE INDIA". He intuitively followed him from Siddharthnagar to Sevagram (then Segaon) in Wardha in search of Azaadi (Freedom from British Rule).

Gandhi was perplexed to see such a young boy wanting to participate in the freedom struggle and took him under his personal tutelage. He became a close aide of Gandhi and is historically listed as the youngest dynamic member of the Sevagram community.

== Political career (1952–1962) ==
Following India's independence, and at the personal behest of Prime Minister Jawaharlal Nehru, Vidyarthi transitioned into mainstream electoral politics under the Indian National Congress banner. He successfully contested the historic first Indian General Elections of 1951–52 and served as a Member of the Legislative Assembly (MLA) until 1962, representing the Basti constituency region (which historically encompassed the Bansi territory).

== Quit India Movement ==
Prabhudayal was detained several times during Indian freedom struggle. He actively participated in Quit India Movement 1942. He was one of the first freedom fighters to be issued an arrest warrant. He went into hiding and travelled across as prefaced in Apni Baat, while he was absconding. British had put a reward of ₹5000 for his arrest. He was asked to surrender by Gandhi and arrested from Sevagram, age 19, on 9 November 1944 for “actively supporting and helping the underground organisation of the mass movement of August 8, 1942”, The Outset of Quit India Movement. He was immediately taken to Red Fort, put in Isolation cell, Interrogated and Tortured for his active participation and close association with Gandhi and Subhas Chandra Bose.

Prabhudayal's Tryst started after attending a students' meeting held in Wardha in July 1942, when It Was decided that students should participate in any movement that Congress might launch. After the arrest of Gandhi in August 1942, He, despite an arrest warrant against him, absconded and participated in sabotage activities that ensued. He Wrote, Translated, Printed and Distributed Pamphlets under headings "Do or Die” ‘करो या मरो’ ‘खुला विद्रोह’ 'Sangathan' and Gandhi's speech of August 8 and Transported Pistols and Explosives from Bombay to get bombs prepared. He helped Hindustani Lal Sena with a secret plan of subversion on the advice of many National Leaders. The plan was to blow away the railway route from the cave located between Nagpur and Bombay with a dynamite blurring. He succeeded in bringing the dynamite from jabalpur which was reported leading to a manhunt with reward by British forcing his surrender, torture and release which is detailed in "Aspects of the Role of Marwaris in Quit India Movement in Calcutta" (1940–42)".

Prabhudayal's Horrific Condition on his release was a Telling story of Torture by British and published in The Hindustan Times titled “Scientific Torture in Red Fort”, on 4 November 1945. His torture included two forms of electric shock (one nozzle onto his little finger and another involving a cylindrical piece being rolled over body causing burning sensation) and being forced to lie on ice slabs until he couldn't breathe. Gandhi took this up with British Govt since he arrived at Sevagram in dilapidated condition and was called to Poona by him for his treatment, as detailed in Gandhi's Correspondence with the British, LETTER TO SIR EVAN M. JENKINS, Collected Works of Mahatma Gandhi, Vol 88, Page 371 letter no 686. Prabhudayal never recovered from his torture at Red Fort and died, age 52, on 7 September 1977.

Hari Vishnu Kamath of All India Forward Bloc was the first to speak on Extreme Torture of Prabhudayal Vidyarthi said, "However Nothing could be got out of this boy This Soldier of Freedom”, in his public address at Chitins Park, Nagpur, on 17 September 1945, published in The Hitavada on 18 September 1945, before his release on 22 October 1945.

The torture methods, as described by Prabhudayal were indeed correct and it was categorically proved that they were in use at both Lahore and Red Fort. Third Degree Methods of physical/mental torture were deployed and continued to be used at Lahore and were certainly used at Delhi. For Delhi it also included some members of INA which has attempted to invade India under Subhas Chandra Bose. A New Statesman letter in July 1945 accused the British of placing 'sadists above the law', as had Germany and that Indian Prison Camps witnessed physical torture that bore comparison with Nazi concentration camps at Buchenwald and Belson". Gandhiji had taken up cases of Prabhudayal Vidyarthi, Sheel Bhadra Yajee of the All India Forward Bloc, active member of INA and Ram Manohar Lohia with British Authorities. All claims/cases and refuted on Point of Fact and classified.

In Prabhudayal's case, British vehemently denied his Torture at Red Fort and manipulated statements of Devdas Gandhi, rather than his dilapidated physical state and narration of "exact torture methods" used on him, to close his case. His file in now declassified as part of INA PAPERS by Government of India. Prabhudayal Vidyarthi and Sheel Bhadra Yajee cases are also discussed in detail in book "South Asian Governmentalities", page 125 onwards, edited by Stephen Legg, Deana Heath South Asian Governmentalities and Colonial and Nationalist Truth Regimes by Stephen Legg which must be read with Gandhi's letter exposing torture of Indian Freedom Fighters under British Rule. A postcard was issued by Sevagram to honour his arrest.

== Political ==
Prabhudayal returned to his village in UP in 1945 and started working with Local Freedom Fighters and Villagers at Gandhi’s behest. In rural India Jamindari was still prevalent. He tried to convince local zamindars (landlords) in his endeavour to help farmers get their land back resulting in attempts on his life.

In 1951-52, Jawaharlal Nehru asked him to contest in the First Indian General Elections. He won against Jansangh founding member and UP President Madhav Prasad Tripathi. As a Member of Assembly he changed the Local Agrarian Eco-system and Economy by setting up a wide canal system for irrigation and enabling other progressive measures.

"Banganga Barrage" and "Banganga Canal Major Irrigation Project" (1953–56) were his initial contribution to help the farmers. "Banganga Canal Major Irrigation Project" was completed in three years. A 45 km canal was constructed to irrigate 23,000 acres of land, in conjunction with other extensive public work campaign resulting in construction of barrage and roads to connect villages etc. immediately after Independence. "Banganga Barrage" is a serene place and known by his name as a tribute to him.

== Writer ==
Vidyarthi became a prolific writer under the guidance of Gandhi. His books were mainly published by The Pustak Bhandar and His articles would regularly appear in The Hindu, Harijan, Balsakha, and other publications. He wrote his first book on Gandhi in jail and the last Devdoot Gandhi in Free India. His book "Gandhi Amrit Vani" is widely read and freely available online on different portals.

He wrote a book on Mahadev Desai, named Bapu ke Mahadev, Sevagram on Ashram life and Mahapurusho ki jeevan jhaki (महापुरुषों की जीवन झाँकी). He also translated for C. F. Andrews. His work can be found at CIET archives, The National Library, New Delhi and at Gandhi Heritage Portal archives.

== Recognition ==
A postcard with his photo was issued by Sevagram immediately after his surrender/arrest in connection with "Quit India Movement".

Van Ganga Barage on Van Ganga River is named after Prabhudayal Vidyarthi

The bridge on Farenda Naugarh-Barhni Shravasti Road, Siddharth Nagar, Uttar Pradesh, is named "Prabhu Dayal Vidyarthi Van Ganga Bridge" to honour his contribution to the Indian freedom struggle.

Jogia Pakdi Marg in District Siddharth Nagar, Uttar Pradesh, is named after Vidyarthi.

Karonda Masinas Lake and Udaipur Lake in District Siddharth Nagar, Uttar Pradesh, are named after Vidyarthi.

'Gandhi ke Vidyarthi Prabhudayal' gives an insight into the life of Vidyarthi before Independence.

'Purvanchal ke Gandhi Prabhudayal Vidayarthi' book by Avinash Kumar Azad was launched in Kapilvastu Festival, Siddharth Nagar. Vidyarthi is remembered with Veterans of INA and as "Purvanchal ke Gandhi" by people in Eastern Uttar Pradesh.
