= Centre for Techno Economic Policy Options =

The Centre for Techno Economic Mineral Policy Options is an agency of the Ministry of Mines, Government of India.

== Background ==
In 1988, the Ministry of Mines convened a Technical Planning and Policy Committee (TPPC) to administer the Mines and Minerals (Development and Regulation) Act (1957). The first Indian National Mineral Policy (1993) sought to incentivize private sector investment in mining and exploration.

In 1994, a government committee, the Wadhawan committee, consulted relevant stakeholders, including offices of statistics and non-government organisations and suggested the TPPC be replaced by an autonomous registered association which could give the stakeholders appropriate non-binding advice. Instead, the Government of India convened a committee, the Hoda committee, to consider the matter further.

In 2006, based on the recommendations of the Hoda committee, the Government of India announced the National Mineral Policy (2008). This policy was to give incentives to encourage the private sector in exploration and mining. Low grade ores would be used through beatification and mining operations would be conducted within a sustainable development framework.

In 2009, the TPPC was replaced by the Centre for Techno-Economic Mineral Policy Options was created. The remit for the centre was based on the "100-day Agenda" of the Ministry of Mines of the United Progressive Alliance (UPA-II) government.

== Organisational arrangements ==
C-TEMPO is funded by a corpus created by a one-time grant by the PSUs. Accordingly, NALCO with the approval of its board of directors, gave a corpus grant of 40,000,000 rupees to C-TEMPO. The balance amount from the corpus has since been returned and fully accounted for.

C-TEMPO, for management purposes, has a General Body and a Governing Council, both headed by the Additional Secretary of the Ministry of Mines in his ex-officio capacity. Other members are the Director-General of the Geological Survey of India, the Controller-General of the Indian Bureau of Mines, and the CMDs of NALCO, HCL and MECL, all in their ex-officio capacity. In addition, a few professionals were inducted.

== Achievements ==
C-TEMPO has focused on three or four major areas, in accordance with its mandate:

- utilization of low grade ores
- exploration, particularly of the deeper subsurface using advanced technologies such as aerial geophysics
- resource security, for elements and minerals in short supply or of critical nature or of strategic interest

C-TEMPO has published:

- A guide to investment in India's mineral industry
- Study on pelletization of iron ore fines in India and utilization of low-grade iron ore and fines.
- Position Paper on “Development of Iron Ore Pelletisation Industry in India‟
- Study on exploration techniques and technology for location and development of deep-seated metals in India
- Position paper on Location and Development of Deep Seated Metalliferous Deposits in India brought out in January 2011.
- Study on Iron-Ore Pelletization. Vol-II
- Study titled: “Relevance of Iron-ore Pelletization industry in India - A Perspective”
- Position Paper on Rare Earth Metals.
- “An Overview of Rare Earth Elements”
- FAQs on The Mines & Minerals Development & Regulation Bill, 2011.
- Status and strategy for exploration and development of Nickel and Platinum Group Elements resources in India
- Strategy paper on “Rare Earths and Energy Critical Elements: A Roadmap and Strategy for India” brought out in July 2012 by C-TEMPO and C-STEP.
- Revision of Aluminum Mission Plan 2010–2020.

== Focus areas for the future ==
C-TEMPO's plans for the future:

- Technical papers on low grade ores and pelletization of iron ore fines,
- Scientific papers on rare earths, technology metals and Energy Critical Metals
- Policy papers on incentivizing deep exploration, attracting investments, and improving the regulatory and governance framework around the Indian Mining Sector
- Strategy papers for Sustainable Development, including issues arising from the Supreme Court guidelines on "carrying capacity" and "mining caps to ensure inter-generational equity"
