= Agyaa =

Village in Uttar Pradesh, India

- Agya
- Interactive map of Agyaa
- Coordinates: 26°51′46.16″N 82°56′39.51″E
- Country: India

Agyaa is a village in Domariaganj, Uttar Pradesh, India.
