= Ramwapur Jagat Ram =

Village in Domariaganj, Uttar Pradesh

Ramwapur Jagat Ram is a rural village in Domariaganj, Uttar Pradesh, India, having a size of 2.79 kilometers squared, with the amount of households ranging from 145 to 223 with a population density of 771.22 people per square kilometer, meaning a population of 896 people as of the 2011 Indian Census
