= Betnar Mustahkam =

Village in Uttar Pradesh, India

Betnar Mustahkam is a village in Domariaganj, Uttar Pradesh, India.
