= Barhya Lal Singh =

Village in Uttar Pradesh, India

Barhya Lal Singh is a village in Domariaganj, Siddharthnagar district, Uttar Pradesh, India.
