= Mirwapur =

Village in Domariaganj, Uttar Pradesh, India

Coordinates: 27°11′N 82°59′E

Mirwapur is a village in Domariaganj, Uttar Pradesh, India.
