= Ministry of Mines (India) =

Government ministry of India

- Branch of Government of India

- Ministry of Mines

Agency overview
- Jurisdiction: Government of India
- Headquarters: Shastri Bhawan, New Delhi
- Annual budget: ₹1,669.52 crore (US$170 million) (2018-19 est.)
- Agency executives: G. Kishan Reddy, Minister of Mines; Satish Chandra Dubey, Minister of State
- Website: mines.gov.in

The Ministry of Mines is the ministry in the Government of India. The ministry functions as the primary body for the formulation and administration of laws relating to mines in India. The head of the ministry is G. Kishan Reddy, who has been serving since June 2024.

== Organisation ==
The Ministry of Mines is responsible for surveying and exploring for minerals (other than natural gas and petroleum) that are used in mining and metallurgy. It searches for non-ferrous metals including: aluminium, copper, zinc, lead, gold, nickel, etc. for administration of Mines and Minerals (Development and Regulation) Act, 1957 (MMDR Act) in respect of all mines and minerals other than coal and lignite. There is one attached office, one subordinate office, three public sector undertakings (PSUs), three autonomous bodies, and additional agencies working under the support of the Ministry of Mines.

Sections

- Pay and Accounts Section
- Protocol Section
- Media and Communication Section
- Mines Division
- International Cooperation Section
- Vigilance Section
- Public Information and Public Grievance Section
- Integrated Finance Section
- Metal Division
- Administrative Section
- Establishment Section
- Coordination Section
- Parliament Section
- Revision Section
- Cash Section
- Receipt and Issue Section
- Hindi Section
- Economic Section
- Information Technology Section
- National Critical Mineral Mission Section
- National Mineral Exploration Trust Secretariat Section
- Indian Bureau of Mines Camp Office Section

Attached office

- Geological Survey of India; headquarters at Kolkata

Subordinate office

- Indian Bureau of Mines, headquarters at Nagpur

Public sector undertakings

- National Aluminium Company Limited (NALCO), Bhubaneswar
- Bharat Gold Mines Limited (BGML)
- Hindustan Copper Limited (HCL), Kolkata
- Mineral Exploration and consultancy Limited (MECL), Nagpur

Autonomous bodies

- Jawaharlal Nehru Aluminium Research Development and Design Centre (JNARDDC), Nagpur
- National Institute of Rock Mechanics (NIRM), Kolar
- National Institute of Miners’ Health (NIMH), Nagpur

Registered society (Autonomous & Self funding)

- Non-Ferrous Technology Development Centre
- National Mineral Exploration Trust
- Centre for Techno Economic Mineral Policy Options (C-TEMPO)

The subject of ‘mineral regulation and development’ occurs at Serial Number 23 of the State list in the VIIth schedule to the Constitution. However the Constitution circumscribes this power, by giving Parliament the power under S.No. 54 of the Union list in the VIIth schedule, to enact legislation, and to this extent the States will be bound by the Central legislation. The MMDR Act is the main Central legislation in force for the sector. The Act was enacted when the Industrial Policy Resolution, 1957 was the guiding policy for the sector, and thus was aimed primarily at providing a mineral concession regime in the context of the metal making public sector undertakings. After the liberalization in 1991, a separate National Mineral Policy (NMP) was promulgated in 1993 which set out the role of the private sector in exploration and mining and the MMDR Act was amended several times to provide for a reasonable concession regime to attract the private sector investment including FDI, into exploration and mining in accordance with NMP 1993.

== National Mineral Policy ==
The first National Mineral Policy was enunciated by the Government in 1993 for liberalization of the mining sector. The National Mineral Policy, 1993 aimed at encouraging the flow of private investment and introduction of state-of-the-art technology in exploration and mining.

In the Mid-Term Appraisal of the Tenth Five-Year Plan, it was observed that the main factors responsible for this were procedural delays in the processing of applications for mineral concessions and the absence of adequate infrastructure in the mining areas. To go into the whole gamut of issues relating to the development of the mineral sector and suggest measures for improving the investment climate the Mid-Term Appraisal had proposed the establishment of a High Level Committee. Accordingly, the Government of India, Planning Commission, constituted a Committee on 14 September 2005. under the Chairmanship of Shri Anwarul Hoda, member, Planning Commission. The Committee made detailed recommendations on all of its terms of Reference in December 2006. Based on the recommendations of the High Level Committee, in consultation with State Governments, the Government replaced the National Mineral Policy, 1993 with a new National Mineral Policy on 13 March 2008.

The National Mineral Policy 2008 provides for a change in the role of the Central Government and the State Governments to incentivize private sector investment in exploration and mining and for ensuring level playing field and transparency in the grant of concessions and promotion of scientific mining within a sustainable development framework so as to protect the interest of local population in mining areas. This has necessitated harmonization of legislation with the new National Mineral Policy.

== Policy reforms ==
The Hoda Committee studied the various reports prepared and submitted by study groups and in- house committees set up by various Ministries from time to time on the issues before the Committee. The Committee gave consideration to the mineral policies of the States as presented by the State Governments, especially to the differing perceptions of mineral-rich and non mineral-rich states. The Committee also gave consideration to the papers prepared by FIMI, which provided comparative analyses of the mineral policies and statutes of other major mineral producing countries in the world such as Australia, Canada, Chile, and South Africa.

== Legislation ==
The Mines and Minerals (Regulation and Development) Act, 1957 was enacted so as to provide for the regulation of mines and development of minerals under the control of the Union. The Act has been amended in 1972, 1986, 1994, 1999 and 2004 in keeping with changes in the policy on mineral development. It has been recently amended in 2016 to make fundamental changes.

== Legislative reform ==
Since that the existing law had already been amended several times and as further amendments may not clearly reflect the objects and reasons emanating from the new Mineral Policy, Government decided to reformulate the legislative framework in the light of the National Mineral Policy, 2008 and consequently, the Mines and Minerals (Development and Regulation) Bill was drafted in 2009-10 by the then Secretary Mines, S. Vijay Kumar, in consultation with the stakeholders. Government then constituted a Group of Ministers, chaired by the Minister of Finance (comprising Ministers of Home, Environment & Forest, Mines, Steel, Coal, Tribal Affairs, Law etc.) which harmonized the views of the Ministries and the final draft as approved by the Cabinet in September 2011, was introduced in Parliament in November 2011.

The Mines and Minerals (Development and Regulation) Bill, 2011, inter alia, provides for the following, namely

- A simple and transparent mechanism with clear and enforceable timelines for grant of mining lease or prospecting licence through competitive bidding in areas of known mineralization, and on the basis of first-in-time in areas where mineralization is not known.
- "Extension" rather than "renewal" of concession to ensure complete exploitation of mineral deposit.
- Facilitating easy transfer of reconnaissance and prospecting licences; mining leases are also transferable but subject to prior approval of State Government.

A notable feature of the Bill is to provide a simple mechanism which ensures that revenues from mining are shared with local communities at individual as well as community level so as to empower them, provide them with choices, enable them to create and maintain local infrastructure and better utilize infrastructure and other services provided for their benefit. The Bill after introduction in Parliament in November 2011, was referred to the Department–related Parliamentary Standing Committee ("Standing Committee" ) which after eliciting the views of all stakeholders, submitted its Report.

Elections in 2014, however led to the Bill lapsing, and the new NDA Government used its majority to effect amendments in the MMDR Act. The most important amendment has been to make auctions the only way to get mineral concessions at prospecting and mining stages. Some auctions have been held, but the industry view seems to be that auctions are likely to lead to delays and supply interruptions, and that the auction is adding to the burden of taxes on mining. Auctions at mining lease stage are also disincentivising exploration by private sector.

== Mining within a sustainable development framework ==
The Hoda Committee made important recommendations on the need for a Sustainable Development Framework (SDF), as follows:

"The Ministry of Mines and MOEF should jointly set up a working group to prepare a SDF specially tailored to the context of India’s mining environment, taking fully into account the work done and being done in ICMM and the IUCN. The Indian SDF comprising of principles, reporting initiatives, and good practice guidelines unique to the three sectors in Indian mining, i.e. SME, captive, and large stand alone, can then be made applicable to mining operations in India and a separate structure set up to ensure adherence to such framework, drawing from both IBM and the field formations of MOEF. • The aspect of social infrastructure in the form of schools, hospitals, drinking water arrangements, etc. needs to be addressed within a formalised framework on the lines of the ICMM model. The Samatha ruling requiring mining companies to spend a set percentage of their profits on model programmes for meeting local needs through a pre-determined commitment, is one option for the country as a whole. Another option could be to require the mining companies to spend a percentage, say three per cent, of their turnover on the social infrastructure in the villages around the mining area. The working group mentioned in paragraph 3.11 may take this into consideration when preparing the Indian SDF and determine the percentage that mining companies could be advised to set aside."

Based on these recommendations, the National Mineral Policy 2008 explicitly underlined the need for mining within a sustainable development framework. The National Mineral Policy 2008 states, (para numbers in brackets are the para numbers in the Policy): "(2.3) A framework of sustainable development will be designed which takes care of biodiversity issues and to ensure that mining activity takes place along with suitable measures for restoration of the ecological balance..."

In para 7.10 it states "Extraction of minerals closely impacts other natural resources like land, water, air and forest. The areas in which minerals occur often have other resources presenting a choice of utilisation of the resources. Some such areas are ecologically fragile and some are biologically rich. It is necessary to take a comprehensive view to facilitate the choice or order of land use keeping in view the needs of development as well as the needs of protecting the forests, environment and ecology... All mining shall be undertaken within the parameters of a comprehensive Sustainable Development Framework... Mining operations shall not ordinarily be taken up in identified ecologically fragile areas and biologically rich areas.

Para 7.11 states that "Appropriate compensation will form an important aspect of the Sustainable Development Framework mentioned in para 2.3 and 7.10…"

Para 7.12 states that: "Once the process of economical extraction of a mine is complete there is need for scientific mine closure which will not only restore ecology and regenerate biomass but also take into account the socio-economic aspects of such closure..."

And not least, para 3.2 of the Policy states that "The Central Govt in consultation with the State Govts shall formulate the legal measures for giving effect to the NMP 2008..The MMDR Act, MCR and MCDR will be amended in line with the policy…"

In line with the Hoda Committee recommendations, the Ministry of Mines commissioned ERM which prepared a Sustainable Development Framework Report in November 2011.

== Cabinet Ministers ==
Portrait	Minister (Birth-Death) Constituency	Term of office			Political party	Ministry	Prime Minister
Portrait	Minister (Birth-Death) Constituency	From	To	Period	Political party	Ministry	Prime Minister
Minister of Works, Mines and Power
	Narhar Vishnu Gadgil (1896–1966); Constituent Assembly Member for Bombay	15 August 1947	26 December 1950	3 years, 133 days	Indian National Congress	Nehru I	Jawaharlal Nehru
Minister of Steel, Mines and Fuel
	Swaran Singh (1907–1994); MP for Jullundur	17 April 1957	10 April 1962	4 years, 358 days	Indian National Congress	Nehru III	Jawaharlal Nehru
Minister of Mines and Fuel
	Keshav Dev Malviya (1904–1981); MP for Domariyaganj (Minister without cabinet rank)	10 April 1962	26 June 1963	1 year, 77 days	Indian National Congress	Nehru IV	Jawaharlal Nehru
	Swaran Singh (1907–1994); MP for Jullundur	26 June 1963	19 July 1963	23 days	Indian National Congress	Nehru IV	Jawaharlal Nehru
	O. V. Alagesan (1911–1992); MP for Chengalpattu (Minister of State)	19 July 1963	21 November 1963	125 days	Indian National Congress	Nehru IV	Jawaharlal Nehru
Minister of Steel, Mines and Heavy Engineering
	Chidambaram Subramaniam (1910–2000); MP for Pollachi	21 November 1963	9 June 1964	201 days	Indian National Congress	Nehru IV	Jawaharlal Nehru
	Chidambaram Subramaniam (1910–2000); MP for Pollachi	21 November 1963	9 June 1964	201 days	Indian National Congress	Nanda I	Gulzarilal Nanda
Minister of Steel and Mines
	Neelam Sanjiva Reddy (1913–1996); MP for Andhra Pradesh (Rajya Sabha)	9 June 1964	24 January 1966	1 year, 229 days	Indian National Congress	Shastri	Lal Bahadur Shastri
	Neelam Sanjiva Reddy (1913–1996); MP for Andhra Pradesh (Rajya Sabha)	9 June 1964	24 January 1966	1 year, 229 days	Indian National Congress	Nanda II	Gulzarilal Nanda
Minister of Mines and Metals
	Surendra Kumar Dey (1906–1989); MP for Nagaur (Minister of State)	24 January 1966	17 January 1967	358 days	Indian National Congress	Indira II	Indira Gandhi
	Tribhuvan Narain Singh (1904–1982); MP for Uttar Pradesh (Rajya Sabha) (Minister of State)	17 January 1967	13 March 1967	55 days	Indian National Congress	Indira II	Indira Gandhi
Minister of Steel, Mines and Metals
	Marri Chenna Reddy (1919–1996); MP for Andhra Pradesh (Rajya Sabha)	16 March 1967	24 April 1968	1 year, 39 days	Indian National Congress	Indira II	Indira Gandhi
	Prakash Chandra Sethi (1919–1996); MP for Indore (Minister of State)	24 April 1968	14 February 1969	296 days	Indian National Congress	Indira II	Indira Gandhi
Minister of Petroleum and Chemicals, and Mines and Metals
	Triguna Sen (1905–1998); MP for Tripura (Rajya Sabha)	14 February 1969	18 March 1971	2 years, 32 days	Indian National Congress (R)	Indira II	Indira Gandhi
Minister of Steel and Mines
	Mohan Kumaramangalam (1916–1973); MP for Pondicherry	2 May 1971	31 May 1973^{[†]}	2 years, 29 days	Indian National Congress (R)	Indira III	Indira Gandhi
	Indira Gandhi (1917–1984); MP for Raebareli (Prime Minister)	31 May 1973	23 July 1973	53 days	Indian National Congress (R)	Indira III	Indira Gandhi
	T. A. Pai (1922–1981); MP for Karnataka (Rajya Sabha)	23 July 1973	11 January 1974	172 days	Indian National Congress (R)	Indira III	Indira Gandhi
	Keshav Dev Malviya (1904–1981); MP for Domariyaganj	11 January 1974	10 October 1974	272 days	Indian National Congress (R)	Indira III	Indira Gandhi
	Chandrajit Yadav (1930–2007); MP for Azamgarh (Minister of State)	10 October 1974	24 March 1977	2 years, 165 days	Indian National Congress (R)	Indira III	Indira Gandhi
	Biju Patnaik (1916–1997); MP for Aska	26 March 1977	15 July 1979	2 years, 111 days	Janata Party	Desai	Morarji Desai
	Morarji Desai (1896–1995); MP for Surat (Prime Minister)	16 July 1979	28 July 1979	12 days	Janata Party	Desai	Morarji Desai
Minister of Steel, Mines and Coal
	Biju Patnaik (1916–1997); MP for Aska	30 July 1979	14 January 1980	168 days	Janata Party (Secular)	Charan	Charan Singh
Minister of Steel and Mines
	Pranab Mukherjee (1935–2020); MP for West Bengal (Rajya Sabha), till 1981; MP for Gujarat (Rajya Sabha), from 1981	16 January 1980	15 January 1982	1 year, 364 days	Indian National Congress	Indira IV	Indira Gandhi
	N. D. Tiwari (1925–2018); MP for Nainital	15 January 1982	14 February 1983	1 year, 30 days	Indian National Congress	Indira IV	Indira Gandhi
	N. K. P. Salve (1921–2012); MP for Maharashtra (Rajya Sabha) (Minister of State, I/C)	14 February 1983	31 October 1984	1 year, 260 days	Indian National Congress	Indira IV	Indira Gandhi
	N. K. P. Salve (1921–2012); MP for Maharashtra (Rajya Sabha) (Minister of State, I/C)	31 October 1984	31 December 1984	1 year, 260 days	Indian National Congress	Rajiv I	Rajiv Gandhi
Minister of Steel, Mines and Coal
	Vasant Sathe (1925–2011); MP for Wardha	31 December 1984	25 September 1985	268 days	Indian National Congress	Rajiv II	Rajiv Gandhi
Minister of Steel and Mines
	K. C. Pant (1931–2012); MP for New Delhi	25 September 1985	12 April 1987	1 year, 199 days	Indian National Congress	Rajiv II	Rajiv Gandhi
	Vasant Sathe (1925–2011); MP for Wardha	12 April 1987	25 July 1987	104 days	Indian National Congress	Rajiv II	Rajiv Gandhi
	Makhan Lal Fotedar (1932–2017); MP for Uttar Pradesh (Rajya Sabha)	25 July 1987	2 December 1989	2 years, 130 days	Indian National Congress	Rajiv II	Rajiv Gandhi
	Dinesh Goswami (1935–1991); MP for Assam (Rajya Sabha)	6 December 1989	10 November 1990	339 days	Asom Gana Parishad	Vishwanath	V. P. Singh
	Ashoke Kumar Sen (1913–1996); MP for West Bengal (Rajya Sabha)	21 November 1990	21 June 1991	212 days	Samajwadi Janata Party (Rashtriya)	Chandra Shekhar	Chandra Shekhar
Minister of Mines
	Balram Singh Yadav (1939–2005); MP for Uttar Pradesh (Rajya Sabha) (Minister of State, I/C)	21 June 1991	15 September 1996	5 years, 86 days	Indian National Congress	Rao	P. V. Narasimha Rao
	Giridhar Gamang (born 1943); MP for Koraput (Minister of State, I/C)	15 September 1996	16 May 1996	244 days	Indian National Congress	Rao	P. V. Narasimha Rao
	Atal Bihari Vajpayee (1924–2018); MP for Lucknow (Prime Minister)	16 May 1996	1 June 1996	16 days	Bharatiya Janata Party	Vajpayee I	Self
	H. D. Deve Gowda (born 1933); Unelected (Prime Minister)	1 June 1996	29 June 1996	28 days	Janata Dal	Deve Gowda	H. D. Deve Gowda
Minister of Steel and Mines
	Birendra Prasad Baishya (born 1956); MP for Mangaldoi	29 June 1996	19 March 1998	1 year, 263 days	Asom Gana Parishad	Deve Gowda	H. D. Deve Gowda
	Birendra Prasad Baishya (born 1956); MP for Mangaldoi	29 June 1996	19 March 1998	1 year, 263 days	Asom Gana Parishad	Gujral	Inder Kumar Gujral
	Naveen Patnaik (born 1946); MP for Aska	19 March 1998	13 October 1999	1 year, 208 days	Biju Janata Dal	Vajpayee II	Atal Bihari Vajpayee
Minister of Mines and Minerals
	Naveen Patnaik (born 1946); MP for Aska	13 October 1999	4 March 2000	143 days	Biju Janata Dal	Vajpayee III	Atal Bihari Vajpayee
	Atal Bihari Vajpayee (1924–2018); MP for Lucknow (Prime Minister)	4 March 2000	6 March 2000	2 days	Bharatiya Janata Party	Vajpayee III	Atal Bihari Vajpayee
	Rangarajan Kumaramangalam (1952–2000); MP for Tiruchirappalli	6 March 2000	27 May 2000	82 days	Bharatiya Janata Party	Vajpayee III	Atal Bihari Vajpayee
Minister of Mines
	Sukhdev Singh Dhindsa (1936–2025); MP for Punjab (Rajya Sabha)	27 May 2000	7 November 2000	164 days	Shiromani Akali Dal	Vajpayee III	Atal Bihari Vajpayee
	Sundar Lal Patwa (1924–2016); MP for Narmadapuram	7 November 2000	1 September 2001	298 days	Bharatiya Janata Party	Vajpayee III	Atal Bihari Vajpayee
Minister of Coal and Mines
	Ram Vilas Paswan (1946–2020); MP for Hajipur	1 September 2001	29 April 2002	240 days	Lok Janshakti Party	Vajpayee III	Atal Bihari Vajpayee
	Atal Bihari Vajpayee (1924–2018); MP for Lucknow (Prime Minister)	29 April 2002	1 July 2002	63 days	Bharatiya Janata Party	Vajpayee III	Atal Bihari Vajpayee
	L. K. Advani (born 1927); MP for Gandhinagar (Deputy Prime Minister)	1 July 2002	26 August 2002	56 days	Bharatiya Janata Party	Vajpayee III	Atal Bihari Vajpayee
	Uma Bharti (born 1959); MP for Bhopal	26 August 2002	29 January 2003	156 days	Bharatiya Janata Party	Vajpayee III	Atal Bihari Vajpayee
Minister of Mines
	Ramesh Bais (born 1947); MP for Raipur (Minister of State, I/C)	29 January 2003	9 January 2004	345 days	Bharatiya Janata Party	Vajpayee III	Atal Bihari Vajpayee
Minister of Coal and Mines
	Mamata Banerjee (born 1955); MP for Calcutta South	9 January 2004	22 May 2004	134 days	Trinamool Congress	Vajpayee III	Atal Bihari Vajpayee
	Shibu Soren (1944–2025); MP for Dumka	23 May 2004	24 July 2004	62 days	Jharkhand Mukti Morcha	Manmohan I	Manmohan Singh
	Manmohan Singh (1932–2024); MP for Assam (Rajya Sabha) (Prime Minister)	24 July 2004	27 November 2004	126 days	Indian National Congress	Manmohan I	Manmohan Singh
Minister of Mines
	Sis Ram Ola (1927–2013); MP for Jhunjhunu	27 November 2004	22 May 2009	4 years, 176 days	Indian National Congress	Manmohan I	Manmohan Singh
	Bijoy Krishna Handique (1934–2015); MP for Jorhat	28 May 2009	19 January 2011	1 year, 236 days	Indian National Congress	Manmohan II	Manmohan Singh
	Dinsha Patel (born 1937); MP for Kheda (Minister of State, I/C until 28 Oct 2012)	19 January 2011	26 May 2014	3 years, 127 days	Indian National Congress	Manmohan II	Manmohan Singh
	Narendra Singh Tomar (born 1957); MP for Gwalior	27 May 2014	5 July 2016	2 years, 39 days	Bharatiya Janata Party	Modi I	Narendra Modi
	Piyush Goyal (born 1964); MP for Maharashtra (Rajya Sabha) (Minister of State, I/C)	5 July 2016	3 September 2017	1 year, 60 days	Bharatiya Janata Party	Modi I	Narendra Modi
	Narendra Singh Tomar (born 1957); MP for Gwalior	3 September 2017	30 May 2019	1 year, 269 days	Bharatiya Janata Party	Modi I	Narendra Modi
	Pralhad Joshi (born 1962); MP for Dharwad	31 May 2019	9 June 2024	5 years, 9 days	Bharatiya Janata Party	Modi II	Narendra Modi
	G. Kishan Reddy (born 1964); MP for Secunderabad	10 June 2024	Incumbent	2 years, 60 days	Bharatiya Janata Party	Modi III	Narendra Modi

== Ministers of State ==
Portrait	Minister (Birth-Death) Constituency	Term of office			Political party	Ministry	Prime Minister
Portrait	Minister (Birth-Death) Constituency	From	To	Period	Political party	Ministry	Prime Minister
Minister of State for Steel, Mines and Fuel
	Keshav Dev Malviya (1904–1981); MP for Domariyaganj; Minister of Mines and Oil from 25 Apr 1957	17 April 1957	10 April 1962	4 years, 358 days	Indian National Congress	Nehru III	Jawaharlal Nehru
Minister of State for Steel, Mines and Metals
	Prakash Chandra Sethi (1919–1996); MP for Indore	13 March 1967	24 April 1968	1 year, 42 days	Indian National Congress	Indira II	Indira Gandhi
Minister of State for Petroleum, Chemicals, Mines and Metals
	Jagannath Rao (1909–?); MP for Chatrapur	14 February 1969	27 June 1970	1 year, 133 days	Indian National Congress (R)	Indira II	Indira Gandhi
	Dajisaheb Chavan (1916–1973); MP for Karad	14 February 1969	18 March 1971	2 years, 32 days	Indian National Congress (R)	Indira II	Indira Gandhi
	Nitiraj Singh Chaudhary (1909–1988); MP for Narmadapuram	26 June 1970	18 March 1971	265 days	Indian National Congress (R)	Indira II	Indira Gandhi
Minister of State for Petroleum, Chemicals and Non-ferrous Metals
	Nitiraj Singh Chaudhary (1909–1988); MP for Narmadapuram	18 March 1971	2 May 1971	45 days	Indian National Congress (R)	Indira III	Indira Gandhi
Minister of State for Steel and Mines
	Shah Nawaz Khan (1914–1993); MP for Meerut	2 May 1971	5 February 1973	1 year, 279 days	Indian National Congress (R)	Indira III	Indira Gandhi
	Kariya Munda (born 1936); MP for Khunti	14 August 1977	28 July 1979	1 year, 348 days	Janata Party	Desai	Morarji Desai
Minister of State for Steel, Mines and Coal
	P. M. Sayeed (1941–2005); MP for Lakshadweep	4 August 1979	14 January 1980	163 days	Indian National Congress (Urs)	Charan	Charan Singh
	Kishore Chandra Deo (born 1947); MP for Parvathipuram	4 August 1979	14 January 1980	163 days	Indian National Congress (Urs)	Charan	Charan Singh
Minister of State for Steel and Mines
	Charanjit Chanana; MP for Delhi (Rajya Sabha)	15 January 1982	2 September 1982	230 days	Indian National Congress	Indira IV	Indira Gandhi
	Ram Dulari Sinha (1922–1994); MP for Sheohar	15 January 1982	14 February 1983	1 year, 30 days	Indian National Congress	Indira IV	Indira Gandhi
	Gargi Shankar Mishra (born 1919); MP for Seoni	2 September 1982	6 September 1982	4 days	Indian National Congress	Indira IV	Indira Gandhi
Minister of State for Steel, Mines and Coal
	K. Natwar Singh (born 1929); MP for Bharatpur; Minister of State, Steel	31 December 1984	25 September 1985	268 days	Indian National Congress	Rajiv II	Rajiv Gandhi
Minister of State for Steel and Mines
	Ram Dulari Sinha (1922–1994); MP for Sheohar; Minister of State, Mines	25 September 1985	14 February 1988	2 years, 142 days	Indian National Congress	Rajiv II	Rajiv Gandhi
	Ramanand Yadav (born 1927); MP for Bihar (Rajya Sabha); Minister of State, Mines	14 February 1988	12 April 1988	58 days	Indian National Congress	Rajiv II	Rajiv Gandhi
	Yogendra Makwana (born 1933); MP for Gujarat (Rajya Sabha)	14 February 1988	2 October 1988	231 days	Indian National Congress	Rajiv II	Rajiv Gandhi
	Mahaveer Prasad (1939–2010); MP for Bansgaon; Minister of State, Mines	4 July 1989	2 November 1989	121 days	Indian National Congress	Rajiv II	Rajiv Gandhi
	Basavaraj Patil Anwari (born 1943); MP for Koppal	21 November 1990	20 February 1991	91 days	Samajwadi Janata Party (Rashtriya)	Chandra Shekhar	Chandra Shekhar
Minister of State for Steel and Mines
	Ramesh Bais (born 1947); MP for Raipur	19 March 1998	13 October 1999	1 year, 208 days	Bharatiya Janata Party	Vajpayee II	Atal Bihari Vajpayee
Minister of State for Mines and Minerals
	Rita Verma (born 1953); MP for Dhanbad	13 October 1999	27 May 2000	227 days	Bharatiya Janata Party	Vajpayee III	Atal Bihari Vajpayee
Minister of State for Mines
	Jaisingrao Gaikwad Patil (born 1949); MP for Beed	27 May 2000	1 September 2001	1 year, 97 days	Bharatiya Janata Party	Vajpayee III	Atal Bihari Vajpayee
Minister of State for Coal and Mines
	Ravi Shankar Prasad (born 1954); MP for Bihar (Rajya Sabha)	1 September 2001	29 January 2003	1 year, 150 days	Bharatiya Janata Party	Vajpayee III	Atal Bihari Vajpayee
Minister of State for Coal and Mines
	Prahlad Singh Patel (born 1960); MP for Balaghat	9 January 2004	22 May 2004	134 days	Bharatiya Janata Party	Vajpayee III	Atal Bihari Vajpayee
	Dasari Narayana Rao (1942–2017); MP for Andhra Pradesh (Rajya Sabha)	23 May 2004	27 November 2004	188 days	Indian National Congress	Manmohan I	Manmohan Singh
Minister of State for Mines
	Dasari Narayana Rao (1942–2017); MP for Andhra Pradesh (Rajya Sabha)	27 November 2004	7 February 2006	1 year, 72 days	Indian National Congress	Manmohan I	Manmohan Singh
	T. Subbarami Reddy (born 1943); MP for Andhra Pradesh (Rajya Sabha)	7 February 2006	6 April 2008	2 years, 59 days	Indian National Congress	Manmohan I	Manmohan Singh
	Bijoy Krishna Handique (1934–2015); MP for Jorhat	6 April 2008	22 May 2009	1 year, 46 days	Indian National Congress	Manmohan I	Manmohan Singh
	Vishnu Deo Sai (born 1964); MP for Raigarh	27 May 2014	5 July 2016	2 years, 39 days	Bharatiya Janata Party	Modi I	Narendra Modi
	Haribhai Parthibhai Chaudhary (born 1954); MP for Banaskantha	3 September 2017	30 May 2019	1 year, 269 days	Bharatiya Janata Party	Modi I	Narendra Modi
	Raosaheb Danve (born 1955); MP for Jalna	31 May 2019	9 June 2024	5 years, 9 days	Bharatiya Janata Party	Modi II	Narendra Modi
	Satish Chandra Dubey (born 1975); MP for Bihar (Rajya Sabha)	10 June 2024	Incumbent	2 years, 60 days	Bharatiya Janata Party	Modi III	Narendra Modi
