= Itwa Assembly constituency =

Constituency of the Uttar Pradesh legislative assembly in India

Coordinates: 27.33°N 82.70°E

Itwa
- Constituency No. 305 for the Uttar Pradesh Legislative Assembly

Constituency details
- Country: India
- Region: North India
- State: Uttar Pradesh
- District: Siddharth Nagar
- Lok Sabha constituency: Domariyaganj
- Total electors: 3,36,392
- Reservation: None

Member of Legislative Assembly
- 18th Uttar Pradesh Legislative Assembly
- Incumbent Mata Prasad Pandey
- Party: Samajwadi Party
- Elected year: 2022
- Preceded by: Satish Chandra Dwivedi; Bharatiya Janata Party

Itwa is a constituency of the Uttar Pradesh Legislative Assembly covering the city of Itwa in the Siddharth Nagar district of Uttar Pradesh, India.

Itwa is one of five assembly constituencies in the Domariyaganj Lok Sabha constituency. Since 2008, this assembly constituency is numbered 305 amongst 403 constituencies.

== Members of Legislative Assembly ==
Year	Member	Party
1974	Gopinath Kameshwar Puri	Indian National Congress
1977	Vishwa Nath Pandey	Janata Party
1980	Mata Prasad Pandey	Janata Party (Secular)
1985	Mata Prasad Pandey	Lokdal
1989	Mata Prasad Pandey	Janata Dal
1991	Mohammed Muqueem	Indian National Congress
1993	Swayamver Choudhary	Bharatiya Janata Party
1996	Mohammed Muqueem	Independent
2002	Mata Prasad Pandey	Samajwadi Party
2007	Mata Prasad Pandey	Samajwadi Party
2012	Mata Prasad Pandey	Samajwadi Party
2017	Satish Chandra Dwivedi	Bharatiya Janata Party
2022	Mata Prasad Pandey	Samajwadi Party

== Election results ==
=== 2027 ===
2027 Uttar Pradesh Legislative Assembly election: Itwa
Party	Candidate	Votes	%	±%
INDIA				
NDA				
BSP				
NOTA	None of the above			
Majority				
Turnout				
gain from		Swing		

=== 2022 ===
Uttar Pradesh Legislative Elections: Itwa
Party	Candidate	Votes	%	±%
SP	Mata Prasad Pandey	64,253	38.54	+9.58
BJP	Satish Chandra Dwivedi	62,591	37.55	+0.56
BSP	Hari Shankar Singh	24,944	14.96	−15.68
INC	Arshad Khursheed	10,326	6.19	
NOTA	None of the above	1,135	0.68	−0.42
Majority		1,662	0.99	−5.36
Turnout		166,700	49.56	−0.48
SP gain from BJP		Swing		

=== 2017 ===
Bharatiya Janta Party candidate Dr. Satish Chandra Dwivedi won in last Assembly election of 2017 Uttar Pradesh Legislative Elections defeating Bahujan Samaj Party candidate Arshad Khursheed by a margin of 10,208 votes.

2017 General Elections: Itwa
Party	Candidate	Votes	%	±%
BJP	Satish Chandra Dwivedi	59,524	36.99	
BSP	Arshad Khurseed	49,316	30.64	
SP	Mata Prasad Pandey	46,601	28.96	
NOTA	None of the above	1,747	1.1	
Majority		10,208	6.35	
Turnout		160,935	50.04	
BJP gain from SP		Swing	▲4.25	

=== 2012 ===
2012 General Elections: Itwa
Party	Candidate	Votes	%	±%
SP	Mata Prasad Pandey	46,142	31.36	
BSP	Subodh Chandra	34,408	23.38	
INC	Mohd Mukeem	33,809	22.98	
BJP	Prem Prakash Urf Jippi	15,979	10.86	
PECP	Abdul Salam	10,697	7.27	
	Remainder 5 Candidates	6,117	4.16	
Majority		11,734	7.97	
Turnout		1,47,152	52.12	
SP hold		Swing		

=== 2007 ===
2007 General Elections: Itwa
Party	Candidate	Votes	%	±%
SP	Mata Prasad Pandey	42,950	33.88	
BSP	JAVED	40,622	32.04	
BJP	HARI SHANKAR SINGH	20,858	16.45	
NCP	SYAMBER CHAUDHARY	8,113	6.40	
INC	KAMAL AHAMAD	6,495	5.12	
	Remainder Candidates	6,117	4.16	
Majority		2,328	6.09	
Turnout		1,26,764	52.12	
SP hold		Swing		

=== 1996 ===
1996 General Elections: Itwa
Party	Candidate	Votes	%	±%
Independent	Mohammed Muqueem	43,106	38.00	
BJP	BRAHM PRAKASH CHAUDHARY	27,919	21.69	
SP	Mata Prasad Pandey	27,487	21.36	
BSP	SWAYMBAR CHAUDHARY	22,987	17.86	
	Rest of the Candidates			
Majority		15,187		
Turnout		130,522	57.79	
SP gain from BJP		Swing		

== See also ==
- Itwa
- List of constituencies of Uttar Pradesh Legislative Assembly
- Siddharthnagar district
