= Kripa Shanker =

Indian politician

Member of Parliament, Lok Sabha
- In office 1962-1967
- Preceded by: Ram Shankar Lal
- Succeeded by: Narayan Swaroop Sharma
- Constituency: Domariyaganj, Uttar Pradesh

Personal details
- Born: 14 December 1897 Basti,United Provinces, British India (present-day Uttar Pradesh, India)
- Party: Indian National Congress
- Spouse: Girja Devi

Kripa Shanker was an Indian politician. He was elected to the Lok Sabha, the lower house of the Parliament of India from Domariyaganj, Uttar Pradesh as a member of the Indian National Congress.
