= Domariyaganj Assembly constituency =

Constituency of the Uttar Pradesh legislative assembly in India

Coordinates: 27.20°N 82.65°E

Domariaganj
- Constituency No. 306 for the Uttar Pradesh Legislative Assembly

Constituency details
- Country: India
- Region: North India
- State: Uttar Pradesh
- District: Siddharth Nagar
- Total electors: 4,09,760
- Reservation: None

Member of Legislative Assembly
- 18th Uttar Pradesh Legislative Assembly
- Incumbent Saiyada Khatoon
- Party: Samajwadi Party
- Elected year: 2022

Domariaganj is a constituency of the Uttar Pradesh Legislative Assembly covering the city of Domariaganj in the Siddharth Nagar district of Uttar Pradesh in India.

Domariaganj is one of five assembly constituencies in the Domariaganj Lok Sabha constituency. Since 2008, this assembly constituency is numbered 306 amongst 403 constituencies.

== Members of Legislative Assembly ==
| Year | Member | Party |
|---|---|---|
| 1967 | Jai Datt Singh | Bharatiya Jana Sangh |
| 1969 | Jalil Abbasi | Indian National Congress |
| 1974 | Jalil Abbasi | Indian National Congress |
| 1977 | Kamal Yusuf Malik | Janata Party |
| 1980 | Kamal Yusuf Malik | Janata Party (Secular) |
| 1985 | Kamal Yusuf Malik | Lokdal |
| 1989 | Prem Prakash Tiwari | Bharatiya Janata Party |
| 1991 | Prem Prakash Tiwari | Bharatiya Janata Party |
| 1993 | Prem Prakash Tiwari | Bharatiya Janata Party |
| 1996 | Taufique Ahmad | Samajwadi Party |
| 2002 | Kamal Yusuf Malik | Samajwadi Party |
| 2007 | Taufique Ahmad | Bahujan Samaj Party |
| 2010^ | Khatoon Taufique | Bahujan Samaj Party |
| 2012 | Kamal Yusuf Malik | Peace Party of India |
| 2017 | Raghvendra Pratap Singh | Bharatiya Janata Party |
| 2022 | Saiyada Khatoon | Samajwadi Party |

== Election results ==
=== 2027 ===
2027 Uttar Pradesh Legislative Assembly election: Domariyaganj
| Party | Candidate | Votes | % | ±% |
|---|---|---|---|---|
| INDIA | | | | |
| NDA | | | | |
| AIMIM | | | | |
| BSP | | | | |
| Majority | | | | |
| Turnout | | | | |
| gain from | | Swing | | |

=== 2022 ===
2022 General Elections: Domariyaganj
| Party | Candidate | Votes | % | ±% |
|---|---|---|---|---|
| SP | Saiyada Khatoon | 85,098 | 41.19 | ▲15.29 |
| BJP | Raghvendra Pratap Singh | 84,327 | 40.82 | ▲7.47 |
| BSP | Ashok Kumar Tewari | 20,416 | 9.88 | ▼23.38 |
| AIMIM | Irfan Ahmad Malik | 4,352 | 2.11 | |
| SS | Shailendra Alias Raju Srivastav | 3,702 | 1.79 | |
| INC | Kanti | 2,453 | 1.19 | |
| NOTA | None of the above | 1,124 | 0.54 | ▼0.27 |
| Majority | | 771 | 0.37 | ▲0.28 |
| Turnout | | 206,586 | 50.42 | ▼0.7 |
| SP gain from BJP | | Swing | | |

=== 2017 ===
Bharatiya Janta Party candidate Raghvendra Pratap Singh won in last Assembly election, the 2017 Uttar Pradesh Legislative Elections, defeating Bahujan Samaj Party candidate Saiyada Khatoon by a margin of 171 votes.

2017 General Elections: Domariyaganj
| Party | Candidate | Votes | % | ±% |
|---|---|---|---|---|
| BJP | Raghvendra Pratap Singh | 67,227 | 33.35 | |
| BSP | Saiyada Khatoon | 67,056 | 33.26 | |
| SP | Ram Kumar Urf Chinku Yadav | 52,222 | 25.9 | |
| PECP | Ashok Kumar Singh | 10,351 | 5.13 | |
| NOTA | None of the above | 1,611 | 0.81 | |
| Majority | | 171 | 0.09 | |
| Turnout | | 201,595 | 51.12 | |
| BJP gain from PECP | | Swing | ▼19.88 | |

=== 2012 ===
2012 General Elections: Domariyaganj
| Party | Candidate | Votes | % | ±% |
|---|---|---|---|---|
| PECP | Malik Mohd Kamal Yusuf | 44,428 | 25.14 | |
| BSP | Saiyada Khatoon | 42,839 | 24.24 | |
| SP | Ram Kumar Urf Chinku Yadav | 41,517 | 23.49 | |
| BJP | Raghvendra Pratap Singh | 25,209 | 14.26 | |
| INC | Sudheer Kumar | 8,973 | 5.08 | |
| | Remainder 9 Candidates | 13,775 | 7.79 | |
| Majority | | 1,589 | 0.90 | |
| Turnout | | 1,76,741 | 51.49 | |
| PECP gain from BSP | | Swing | | |
