= Hindustani Lal Sena =

Anticolonial guerrilla group in India

Hindustani Lal Sena (Hindi: हिन्दुस्तानि लाल सेना, 'Indian Red Army') was an anticolonial guerrilla group in India. It was formed on 13 April 1939 (on the anniversary day of the Jallianwala Bagh massacre). It was founded by Maganlal Bagdi and Pandit Shyam Narain Kashmiri along with their associates.

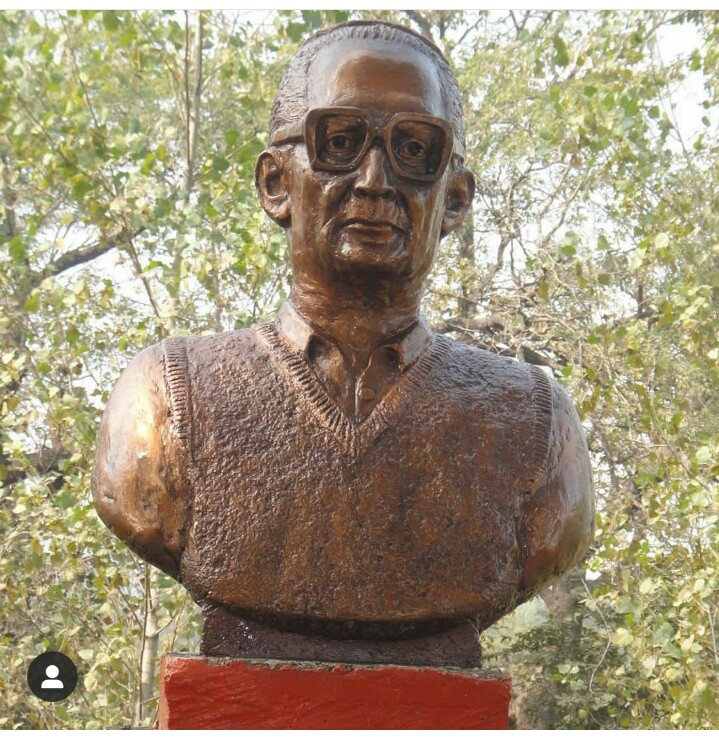
Pandit Shyam Narayan Kashmiri

In Calcutta, 1943, a secret plan of subversion was planned on the advice of many national leaders. The plan was to blow away the railway route from the cave located between Nagpur and Bombay, with a dynamite blurring so that the contact with a large part of Bombay was broken. For successful execution of the plan it was necessary to take the support of the revolutionaries of Nagpur. At that time the great revolutionary of the Nagpur was the founder of‘Hindustan Red Army', Maganlal Bagdi. Bhanwarmal Singhi along with Prabhudayal Vidyarthi, a close associate of Gandhi, went to Nagpur to meet Maganlal Bagdi. who assured him to give them full support.

== See also ==
- Lal Sena
