= Madhav Prasad Tripathi =

Indian politician

President of Bharatiya Janata Party, Uttar Pradesh
- In office 1980–1984
- Preceded by: Office established
- Succeeded by: Kalyan Singh

Member of Parliament, Lok Sabha
- In office 1977–1980
- Preceded by: Keshav Dev Malviya
- Succeeded by: Kazi Jalil Abbasi
- Constituency: Domariyaganj

Leader of the Opposition Uttar Pradesh Legislative Assembly
- In office 2 April 1965 – 9 March 1967
- Chief Minister: Sucheta Kripalani
- Preceded by: Sharda Bhukt Singh
- Succeeded by: Ram Chandra Vikal

Member of Uttar Pradesh Legislative Assembly
- In office 1969–1977
- Preceded by: L. K. K. Pal
- Succeeded by: Jagdamba Prasad Singh
- Constituency: Basti
- In office 1962–1967
- Preceded by: Prabhudayal Vidyarthi
- Succeeded by: Constituency defunct
- Constituency: Banganga West

Member of Uttar Pradesh Legislative Council
- In office 1958–1962

Personal details
- Born: 12 September 1917 Tiwaripur, United Provinces of Agra and Oudh, British India (now in Uttar Pradesh, India)
- Died: 1985 (aged 67-68) Lucknow, Uttar Pradesh, India
- Party: Bharatiya Janata Party (1980-1985)
- Other political affiliations: Bharatiya Jan Sangh (till 1977)
- Parent: Sureshwar Prasad Tripathi (father)
- Education: BA, LLB

Madhav Prasad Tripathi (12 September 1917 – 1985) was a leader of Bharatiya Janata Party from Uttar Pradesh. He was an Indian philosopher, sociologist, historian and political scientist.

He was one of the most important leaders of the Bharatiya Jana Sangh and played key role in establishing the party, the forerunner of the present day Bharatiya Janata Party.

== Early life and education ==
Tripathi was born in 1912 in the village Tiwaripur, Bansi near the Basti district (now in Siddharthanagar, Uttar Pradesh). His father was a well known learned person and was active in Indian freedom movement. Tripathi was a quick learner from his early childhood and showed signs of working for the society at very young age.

While he was a student at Banaras Hindu University, Varanasi in 1937, Tripathi came into contact with the Rashtriya Swayamsevak Sangh (RSS). He met the founder of the RSS, K. B. Hedgewar, who engaged with him in an intellectual discussion at one of the shakhas. He dedicated himself to full-time work in the RSS from 1942. Tripathi had attended the 40-day summer vacation RSS camp at Nagpur where he underwent training in Sangh Education. After completing second-year training in the RSS Education Wing, Shri Madahav Tripathi became a lifelong pracharak of the RSS. He worked as the pracharak for the Lakhimpur district and, from 1955, as the joint prant pracharak (regional organiser) for Uttar Pradesh. He was regarded as an ideal swayamsevak of the RSS essentially because ‘his discourse reflected the pure thought-current of the Sangh’.

In 1951, when Syama Prasad Mookerjee founded the Bharatiya Jana Sangh, Deendayal was seconded to the party by the RSS, tasked with moulding it into a genuine member of the Sangh Parivar.

Tripathi was a member of Lok Sabha elected from Domariaganj in 1977. He was born in 1917 in Bansi, Basti district and studied law. He was a member of Uttar Pradesh Legislative Council during 1958–62 and a member of Uttar Pradesh Legislative Assembly during 1962–66 and 1969–77 periods elected as a candidate of Jan Sangh. Tripathi served as leader of opposition in Uttar Pradesh Legislative Assembly and also as cabinet minister in the Government of Uttar Pradesh too. He was first ever state president of Bharatiya Janata Party Uttar Praddesh.

Tripathi was a mentor to present day many senior leaders of BJP who hailed from eastern Uttar Pradesh, some of the prominent names include Shri Rajnath Singh, Shri Kalraj Mishra, Dr. Mahendra Nath Pandey, Late Shri Harish Srivastav. He was a close aide of Shri Atal Bihari Vajpayee and was his trusted person for Uttar Pradesh. Although Madha Babu was a BJP politician he enjoyed great respect from other party leaders including Late Shri Chaudhary Charan Singh, Mulayam Singh Yadav. There is a famous incident that once Madhav Babu lost legislative elections of Uttar Pradesh to Freedom Fighter Prabhudayal Vidyarthi, then Chaudhary Charan Singh got him elected to legislative assembly as a MLC by asking his party MLAs to vote for his favor.

Similar to the controversial death of Deen Dayal Upadhyay he died due to heart attack in 1985 at Lucknow Railway station while traveling. His grandson Siddharth Tripathi is now carrying forward the legacy of his grandfather, he is member of BJP and active social worker Varanasi & Lucknow.
