= Narayan Swaroop Sharma =

Indian politician (born 1930)

Member of Parliament, Lok Sabha
- In office 1967-1971
- Preceded by: Kripa Shanker
- Succeeded by: Keshav Dev Malviya
- Constituency: Domariyaganj, Uttar Pradesh

Personal details
- Born: 14 February 1930 Deoband,United Provinces, British India (present-day Uttar Pradesh, India)
- Party: Bharatiya Jana Sangh
- Spouse: Urmila Goel

Narayan Swaroop Sharma (born 14 February 1930) was an Indian politician. He was elected to the Lok Sabha, the lower house of the Parliament of India from Domariyaganj, Uttar Pradesh as a member of the Bharatiya Jana Sangh.
