= Mata Prasad Pandey =

Indian politician (born 1942)

33rd Leader of the Opposition in Uttar Pradesh Legislative Assembly
- Incumbent
- Assumed office 28 July 2024
- Speaker: Satish Mahana
- Preceded by: Akhilesh Yadav
- Constituency: Itwa, Uttar Pradesh

15th Speaker of the Uttar Pradesh Legislative Assembly
- In office 13 April 2012 – 30 March 2017
- Governor: Banwari Lal Joshi; Aziz Qureshi; Ram Naik
- Preceded by: Sukhdev Rajbhar
- Succeeded by: Hriday Narayan Dikshit
- In office 26 July 2004 – 18 May 2007
- Governor: T. V. Rajeswar
- Deputy: Rajesh Agrawal
- Preceded by: Keshari Nath Tripathi
- Succeeded by: Sukhdev Rajbhar

Member of the Uttar Pradesh Legislative Assembly for Itwa
- Incumbent
- Assumed office 10 March 2022
- Preceded by: Satish Chandra Dwivedi
- In office 26 February 2002 – 19 March 2017
- Preceded by: Mohammed Muqueem
- Succeeded by: Satish Chandra Dwivedi
- In office 9 June 1980 – 22 June 1991
- Preceded by: Vishwanath Pandey
- Succeeded by: Mohammed Muqueem

Personal details
- Born: 31 December 1942 (age 83) Itwa, United Provinces, British India
- Party: Samajwadi Party
- Spouse: Suryamati Pandey (m. 1965)
- Children: 6
- Education: Gorakhpur University
- Occupation: Politician
- Profession: Agriculturist

Mata Prasad Pandey (born 31 December 1942) is an Indian politician, currently serving as the Leader of the Opposition in Uttar Pradesh Legislative Assembly since 28 July 2024.

At present he is representing Itwa 305 constituency in Siddharthnagar of Uttar Pradesh. He was Speaker of Uttar Pradesh Legislative Assembly for 2 terms.

== Career timeline ==
- Elected Member of the Legislative Assembly in 1980, 1985, 1989, 2002, 2007, 2012 and 2022
- Participated in several political movements and imprisoned several times for movement for upliftment of the poor and down trodden people of the society.
- He has been member of Assurance Committee, Petition Committee, Delegated Legislation Committee, Parliamentary Research, Reference and Studies Committee, Rules Committee, Question and Reference Committee, Business Advisory Committee, Privilege Committee and Public Accounts Committee of the Uttar Pradesh Legislative Assembly.
- Minister for Health in 1991 and Minister for Labour and Employment in 2003
- Speaker, Uttar Pradesh Legislative Assembly 26.07.2004 to 18.05.2007

== Political career ==
Pandey was a trusted man of Mulayam Singh Yadav and he has been jailed several times in his early political career. He was active in political protests since his student days. He won his first assembly election in 1980 as a candidate of Janata Party from Itwa Assembly constituency. He repeated this victory in 1985 and 1989, as a candidate of Lok Dal and Janata Party respectively. He lost the assembly elections of 1991 and 1996. In 1996, he was a candidate of Samajwadi Party. Pandey, however, was made minister of health in Mulayam Singh Yadav government in 1991 and in the year 1993, he was made minister for labour and employment. He registered four electoral victories in assembly elections of 2002, 2007, 2012 and 2022 thereafter.

Pandey was a senior leader of Samajwadi Party, having served in Uttar Pradesh Legislative Assembly for multiple terms. In 2024, he was one of the most eligible contender for the post of leader of opposition besides Indrajeet Saroj and Shivpal Yadav in Samajwadi Party. However, he was chosen over others by party chief Akhilesh Yadav with the strategy to slice BJP's upper caste base. In July 2024, Pandey was formally appointed the leader of opposition in Uttar Pradesh Legislative Assembly.

== Conferences attended ==
1. 50th Commonwealth Parliamentary Conference (Quebec City/Toronto) Canada: 2004
2. 58th Commonwealth Parliamentary Conference Colombo, Sri Lanka: 2012
