= Saiyada Khatoon =

Indian politician

Uttar Pradesh Legislative Assembly
- Preceded by: Raghvendra Pratap Singh
- Constituency: Domariyaganj

Personal details
- Political party: Samajwadi Party
- Parent: Taufeeq Ahmad (father)
- Education: Masters of Arts (Political Science)
- Alma mater: Deen Dayal Upadhyay Gorakhpur University

Saiyada Khatoon (born 20 April 1970) is an Indian politician from Uttar Pradesh. She won the 2022 Uttar Pradesh Legislative Assembly election from Domariyaganj Assembly constituency representing Samajwadi Party.

== Early life and education ==
Khatoon is from Domariyaganj, Siddharthnagar district. She completed post graduation in Arts in 2010 at Deen Dayal Upadhyay Gorakhpur University.

== Career ==
Khatoon won the 2022 Uttar Pradesh Legislative Assembly election from Domariyaganj Assembly constituency in Siddharthnagar district representing Samajwadi Party. She polled 85,098 votes and defeated Raghvendra Pratap Singh of Bharatiya Janata Party by a narrow margin of 771 votes.

On 10 March 2022, after winning the election, Khatoon and 200 other Samajwadi Party members were named in a first information report for allegedly raising pro-Pakistan slogans. She denied the allegations.
