= Bansi Assembly constituency =

Constituency of the Uttar Pradesh legislative assembly in India

Coordinates: 27.18°N 82.93°E

Bansi
- Constituency No. 304 for the Uttar Pradesh Legislative Assembly

Constituency details
- Country: India
- Region: North India
- State: Uttar Pradesh
- District: Siddharthnagar
- Reservation: None

Member of Legislative Assembly
- 18th Uttar Pradesh Legislative Assembly
- Incumbent Jai Pratap Singh
- Party: Bharatiya Janta Party
- Elected year: 2022
- Preceded by: Lal Ji Yadav

Bansi is a constituency of the Uttar Pradesh Legislative Assembly covering the city of Bansi in the Siddharthnagar district of Uttar Pradesh, India.

Bansi is one of five assembly constituencies in the Lok Sabha constituency of Domariyaganj. Since 2008, this assembly constituency is numbered 304 amongst 403 constituencies.

== Members of Legislative Assembly ==
Year	Member	Party
1967	Prabhu Dayal	Indian National Congress
1969	Madhav Prasad Tripathi	Bharatiya Jana Sangh
1974	Madhav Prasad Tripathi	Bharatiya Jana Sangh
1977	Harish Chandra Srivastava	Janata Party
1980	Deena Nath	Indian National Congress (Indira)
1985	Harish Chandra Srivastava	Bharatiya Janata Party
1989	Jai Pratap Singh	Independent politician
1991	Jai Pratap Singh	Independent politician
1993	Jai Pratap Singh	Bharatiya Janata Party
1996	Jai Pratap Singh	Bharatiya Janata Party
2002	Jai Pratap Singh	Bharatiya Janata Party
2007	Lal Ji Yadav	Samajwadi Party
2012	Jai Pratap Singh	Bharatiya Janata Party
2017	Jai Pratap Singh	Bharatiya Janata Party
2022	Jai Pratap Singh	Bharatiya Janata Party

== Election results ==
=== 2027 ===
2027 Uttar Pradesh Legislative Assembly election: Bansi
Party	Candidate	Votes	%	±%
INDIA				
NDA				
BSP				
NOTA	None of the above			
Majority				
Turnout				
gain from		Swing		

=== 2022 ===
2022 General Elections: Bansi
Party	Candidate	Votes	%	±%
BJP	Jai Pratap Singh	84,596	44.82	+2.79
SP	Naveen	64,256	34.04	+2.28
BSP	Radheshyam	22,071	11.69	−7.51
Sabka Dal United	Shakuntala	4,049	2.15	+0.85
AIMIM	Saimuhammad	3,443	1.82	
INC	Kiran Shukla	2,931	1.55	
AAP	Pradeep Kumar	2,080	1.1	
NOTA	None of the above	1,598	0.85	−0.05
Majority		20,340	10.78	+0.51
Turnout		188,754	49.51	−1.26
BJP hold		Swing		

=== 2017 ===
Bharatiya Janta Party candidate Jai Pratap Singh won in 2017 Uttar Pradesh Legislative Elections defeating Samajwadi Party candidate Lal ji by a margin of 18,942 votes.

2017 General Elections: Bansi
Party	Candidate	Votes	%	±%
BJP	Jai Pratap Singh	77,548	42.03	
SP	Lal Ji Yadav	58,606	31.76	
BSP	Lal Chandra Nishad	35,425	19.2	
Sabka Dal United	Ramsuresh	2,391	1.3	
RLD	Kiran	2,304	1.25	
Independent	Mo. Umar	2,019	1.09	
NOTA	None of the above	1,641	0.9	
Majority		18,942	10.27	
Turnout		184,514	50.77	
BJP hold		Swing	▲14.31	

=== 2012 ===
2012 General Elections: Bansi
Party	Candidate	Votes	%	±%
BJP	Jai Pratap Singh	47,323	28.10	
SP	Lal Ji Yadav	44,429	26.38	
BSP	Vinay Shankar Tiwari	36,412	21.62	
PECP	Maulana Mohd Sarvar	14,214	8.44	
INC	Ishwar Chandra Shukla	12,067	7.17	
	Remainder 11 Candidates	13,946	8.28	
Majority		2,894	1.72	
Turnout		1,68,391	52.16	
BJP gain from SP		Swing		

=== 2007 ===
2007 General Elections: Bansi
Party	Candidate	Votes	%	±%
SP	Lal Ji Yadav	38,648	32.67	
BJP	Jai Pratap Singh	36,134	30.54	
BSP	GOPAL JI MISHRA	19,788	16.72	
INC	KAMALA SAHANI	6,748	5.70	
	Remainder 9 Candidates	16974	14.34	
Majority		2,894	1.72	
Turnout		1,18,292	52.16	
SP gain from BJP		Swing		
