= Gauri, Siddharath Nagar =

Gauri
- village
- Location in Uttar Pradesh, India Gauri (India)
- Coordinates: 27.101694°N 82.817889°E
- Country: India
- State: Uttar Pradesh
- District: Siddharthnagar district
- Talukas: Bansi

Government
  - Type: Democracy
  - Body: Gram panchayat

Population (2011)
  - Total: 524

Languages
  - Official: Hindi
- Time zone: UTC+5:30 (IST)
- PIN: 272153
- Vehicle registration: UP 55
- Sex ratio: 0.933 (2011) ♀/♂
- Nearest city: Bansi
- Lok Sabha constituency: Domariyaganj
- Vidhan Sabha constituency: Bansi

Gauri is a small village in Mithwal block located in Bansi tehsil of Siddharth Nagar district, Uttar Pradesh in India. It belongs to the Basti Division. It is located 37 km west of district headquarters Navgarh and 251 km from state capital Lucknow. It is located on west side of the state highway between Basti and Lumbini. According to the 2011 census Gauri had a population of 524.

== Geography ==
Gauri village lies at 27°06'12.30"N 82°49'10.62"E. It is part of Purvanchal. It is surrounded by Kotiya Gadori to the west and Gaura to the north. Gauragarh (1 km), Puraina(2 km), Kotiya Garori (2 km), Dubauli(2 km) are the nearby villages.

== Religion ==
The majority of the people are Hindus, most of the rest being Muslims. Hindu festivals like Deepawali, Holi and Dusherra are celebrated.

== Economy ==
Agriculture is one of main profession in Gauri. Of the total population, 187 were engaged in work activities.
