= Sheel Bhadra Yajee =

He was son of Ram mohan roy

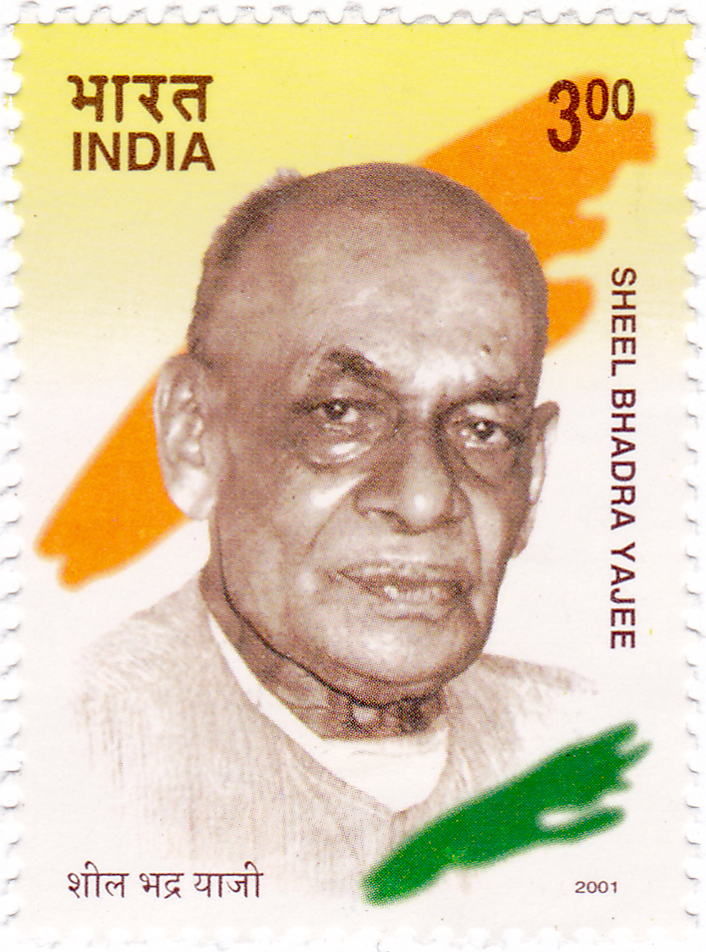
Sheel Bhadra Yajee on a 2001 stamp of India

Sheel Bhadra Yajee (1906–1996) was an activist from Bihar who was associated with the non-violent and the violent form of the Indian independence movement.

== Life ==
Sheel Bhadra Yajee was born on 22 March 1906 at Bhaktiyarpur village in Patna district of Bihar. He was the only child of Shivtahal Yajee and Reshma Yajee. Bhadra's mother died when he was 10-years-old. He was then raised by Parvati, wife of his cousin Shri Kamal Yajee.

Yajee's participation in the freedom movement began in 1928 when, as a student, he attended the Calcutta Session of the Indian National Congress. He joined the Congress Socialist Party four years later and became involved in the Kisan movement. Later, he associated with Subhas Chandra Bose and Mahatma Gandhi.

In 1939, he joined Bose to found the All India Forward Bloc. He associated with the INA movement. He was arrested in 1939 and isolated at Red Fort. On October 10, 1945, Gandhi wrote to the Private Secretary to the Viceroy expressing concern that his treatment at Lal Kila, which he called "third degree methods" of physical/mental torture, were deployed and continued to be used at Lahore and were certainly used at Delhi.

For Delhi it also included some members of INA which has attempted to invade India under Subhas Chandra Bose. A New Statesman letter in July 1945 accused the British of placing sadists above the law, as had Germany, and that Indian prison camps witnessed physical torture that bore comparison with Nazi concentration camps at Buchenwald and Belson. Gandhi forwarded Yajee's account (which was reported in the press across the country) of his four months at the Red Fort in 1943 under the control of military authorities. The letter described a 10 by 10 foot cell without natural light, infested with insect. It was like "living in a burning hell and a land of living dead", forty-five days of solitary confinement and "relentless and merciless" interrogation by Intelligence Department Staff who ... sought information on Congress sabotage, Japanese collaborators and Bose's activities." However, the said claims were refuted on point of fact.

Gandhiji had taken up Torture of Sheel Bhadra Yajee, Prabhudayal Vidyarthi and Ram Manohar Lohia at Red Fort with British Authorities. These cases are discussed in detail in book "South Asian Governmentalities", page 125 onwards, edited by Stephen Legg, Deana Heath.

Yajee opposed caste prejudices and other social evils. He believed in the active participation of the peasants, workers and the middle classes in the struggle for the transformation of society. He was a member of the Rajya Sabha from 27 April 1957 to 2 April 1958, 3 April 1958 to 2 April 1964, and 3 April 1966 to 2 April 1972.

Yajee authored A Glimpse of the Indian Labour Movement, Forward Bloc and Its Stand, Is Socialism a Necessity to India, and True Face of Monopolistic American Democracy. The government of India issued a commemorative stamp of him on 28 January 2001.

== Books authored ==
- The Forward Bloc: Its policy and programme: Presidential Address of Com. Sheel Bhadra Yajee at the Fourth Party Conference, All India Forward Bloc, Inghota ... (Bundel Khand) U. P., 11 and 12 May 1949; All India Forward Bloc (1949).
- Americans abroad: The world press on the behaviour of U.S. servicemen in foreign countries, Harsh Publications (1959).
- CIA operations against the Third World, Distributed by Deep & Deep Publications (1985).
- CIA, manipulating arm of the U.S. foreign policy: 40 years of CIA manoeuvres against freedom and human dignity, Criterion Publications (1987).
