= Satish Chandra Dwivedi =

Indian politician

Dr Satish Chandra Dwivedi

Minister of Basic Education Government of Uttar Pradesh
- In office 21 August 2019 – 25 March 2022
- Chief Minister: Yogi Adityanath
- Preceded by: Anupama Jaiswal
- Succeeded by: Sandeep Singh

Member of Uttar Pradesh Legislative Assembly
- In office 2017–2022
- Preceded by: Mata Prasad Pandey
- Succeeded by: Mata Prasad Pandey
- Constituency: Itwa

Personal details
- Born: 1 May 1978 (age 48) Shanichara, Siddharthnagar, Uttar Pradesh
- Party: Bharatiya Janata Party
- Education: Deen Dayal Upadhyay Gorakhpur University (PhD)
- Occupation: MLA
- Profession: Politician; Teacher

Satish Chandra Dwivedi is an Indian politician and member of 17th Legislative Assembly of Uttar Pradesh and currently serving as Minister of State (Independent Charge) for Primary education. He is the representative of the Itwa (Assembly constituency) constituency of Uttar Pradesh and is a member of Bharatiya Janata Party.

== Early life and education ==
Dwivedi was born on 1 May 1978 in Shanichara village in Siddharthnagar district of Uttar Pradesh to Lt. Ayodhya Prasad Dwivedi. In 2009, he married Dr. Kalyani Dwivedi, they have one son and one daughter. He hails from a Brahmin family. In 2010, he attended Deen Dayal Upadhyay Gorakhpur University and received Doctor of Philosophy (PhD).

== Political career ==
Dwivedi's political life began with the student council. He was successful in the legislature in the first attempt. In 17th Legislative Assembly of Uttar Pradesh (2017) elections, he defeated erstwhile assembly speaker Mata Prasad Pandey (Samajwadi Party) by a margin of 12,923 votes.

In August 2019, after first cabinet expansion of Yogi Adityanath Government he was appointed Minister of State (Independent Charge) for Basic Education.

== Posts held ==
- March 2017– Incumbent, Member in 17th Legislative Assembly of Uttar Pradesh
  - August 2019– Incumbent, Minister of State (Independent Charge) for Basic Education in Government of Uttar Pradesh
