= Domariyaganj Lok Sabha constituency =

Lok Sabha Constituency in Uttar Pradesh, India

Coordinates: 27.2°N 82.7°E

Domariyaganj UP-60
- Lok Sabha constituency
- Interactive Map Outlining Domariyaganj Lok Sabha constituency

Constituency details
- Country: India
- Region: North India
- State: Uttar Pradesh
- Assembly constituencies: Shohratgarh; Kapilvastu; Bansi; Itwa; Domariyaganj
- Established: 1952
- Reservation: None

Member of Parliament
- 18th Lok Sabha
- Incumbent Jagdambika Pal
- Party: Bharatiya Janata Party
- Elected year: 2024

Domariyaganj (formerly Domariaganj) is one of the 80 Lok Sabha (parliamentary) constituencies in the Indian state of Uttar Pradesh. This constituency covers the entire Siddharthnagar district.

== Assembly segments ==
Presently, Domariyaganj Lok Sabha constituency comprises five Vidhan Sabha (legislative assembly) segments. These are:

No	Name	District	Member	Party	2024 Lead
302	Shohratgarh	Siddharthnagar	Vinay Verma	AD(S)	BJP
303	Kapilvastu (SC)	Siddharthnagar	Shyamdhani Rahi	BJP	BJP
304	Bansi	Siddharthnagar	Jai Pratap Singh	BJP	BJP
305	Itwa	Siddharthnagar	Mata Prasad Pandey	SP	SP
306	Domariyaganj	Siddharthnagar	Saiyadha Khatoon	SP	SP

== Members of Parliament ==
Year	Member	Party
1952	Keshav Dev Malviya	Indian National Congress
1957	Ram Shankar Lal	Indian National Congress
1962	Kripa Shanker	Indian National Congress
1967	Narayan Swaroop Sharma	Bharatiya Jana Sangh
1971	Keshav Dev Malviya	Indian National Congress
1977	Madhav Prasad Tripathi	Janata Party
1980	Kazi Jalil Abbasi	Indian National Congress (I)
1984	Kazi Jalil Abbasi	Indian National Congress
1989	Brij Bhushan Tiwari	Janata Dal
1991	Rampal Singh	Bharatiya Janata Party
1996	Brij Bhushan Tiwari	Samajwadi Party
1998	Rampal Singh	Bharatiya Janata Party
1999	Rampal Singh	Bharatiya Janata Party
2004	Mohammed Muqueem	Bahujan Samaj Party
2009	Jagdambika Pal	Indian National Congress
2014	Jagdambika Pal	Bharatiya Janata Party
2019	Jagdambika Pal	Bharatiya Janata Party
2024	Jagdambika Pal	Bharatiya Janata Party

== Election results ==
=== General Election 2024 ===
2024 Indian general election: Domariaganj
Party	Candidate	Votes	%	±%
BJP	Jagdambika Pal	463,303	45.47	▼4.49
SP	Bhishma Shankar Tiwari	4,20,575	41.27	▲41.27
ASP(KR)	Amar Singh Chaudhary	81,305	7.98	New
BSP	Md. Nadeem	35,936	3.53	▼35.74
NOTA	None of the above	9,447	0.93	▼0.26
Majority		42,728	4.19	▼6.50
Turnout		10,18,965	51.94	▼0.32
BJP hold		Swing		

=== General Election 2019 ===
2019 Indian general election: Domariaganj
Party	Candidate	Votes	%	±%
BJP	Jagdambika Pal	492,253	49.96	
BSP	Aftab Alam	3,86,932	39.27	
INC	Chandresh Kumar Upadhyay	60,549	6.15	
NOTA	None of the above	11,757	1.19	
Majority		1,05,321	10.69	
Turnout		9,85,330	52.26	
BJP hold		Swing		

=== General election 2014 ===
2014 Indian general election: Domariyaganj
Party	Candidate	Votes	%	±%
BJP	Jagdambika Pal	298,845	31.96	
BSP	Mohammed Muqueem	1,95,257	20.88	
SP	Mata Prasad Pandey	1,74,778	18.69	
PECP	Dr. Mohammad Ayub	99,242	10.61	
INC	Vasundhara Singh	88,117	9.42	
Independent	Mukesh Narayan Shukla	10,952	1.17	
NOTA	None of the above	6,776	0.72	
Majority		1,03,588	11.08	
Turnout		9,35,029	53.08	
BJP gain from INC		Swing		

=== General election 2009 ===
2009 Indian general election: Domariyaganj
Party	Candidate	Votes	%	±%
INC	Jagdambika Pal	229,872	31.24	
BJP	Jai Pratap Singh	153,306	20.83	
BSP	Mohammed Muqueem	151,787	20.63	
PECP	Inamullah Chaudhary	79,820	10.85	
SP	Mata Prasad Pandey	60,186	8.18	
Majority		76,566		
Turnout		7,35,879		
INC gain from BSP		Swing		

== See also ==
- Siddharthnagar district
- List of constituencies of the Lok Sabha
- Gauri, Siddharath Nagar
