= Shastri Bhawan =

Building in New Delhi

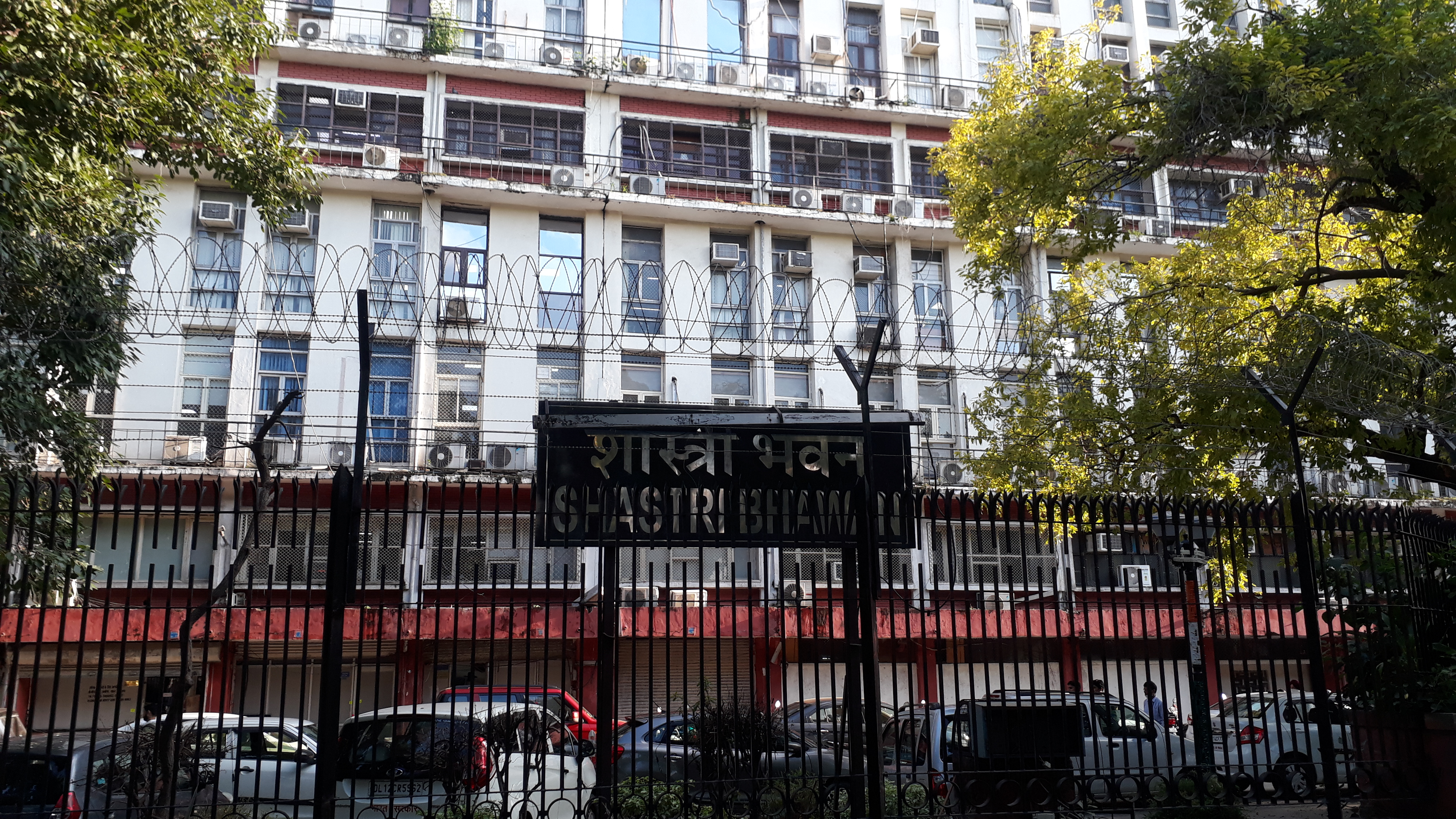
- Shastri Bhavan in New Delhi, the seat of the Ministry

- Location within Delhi
- Alternative names: Shastri Bhawan

General information
- Status: Vacant, to be demolished.
- Location: Dr Rajendra Prasad Rd, Rajpath Area, Central Secretariat, New Delhi, Delhi 110001, New Delhi, India
- Coordinates: 28.6164°N 77.2150°E
- Current tenants: Various union ministries
- Owner: Government of India

Shastri Bhavan is a government building in New Delhi. The building is named after India's second Prime Minister Lal Bahadur Shastri. This large sprawling building houses several Ministries of the Government of India.

== Location ==
The building is on the north side of the Kartavya Path, while Dr. Rajendra Prasad Road passes through the north side and Krishi Bhawan is on the West side of the building.

== Tenants ==
This large building houses various ministries of union government like:

- Coal
- Corporate Affairs
- Education
- Information and Broadcasting
- Law and Justice
- Mines
- Petroleum and Natural Gas
- Social Justice and Empowerment
- Tribal Affairs
- Women and Child Development
- Youth Affairs and Sports etc.

== Transport ==
Central Secretariat metro station is the nearest metro station to the building. Dr. Rajendra Prasad Marg is on the north, Rafi Ahmed Kidwai Marg is on the West, with both roads intersecting at Shanti Chakra, while Rajendra Prasad Marg intersects Janpath Road on the east.
