= Keshav Dev Malviya =

Indian politician (1904–1981)

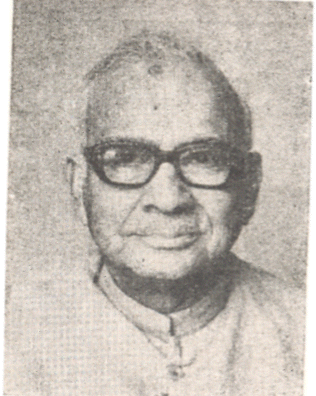
- Official Lok Sabha portrait

Union Minister of Petroleum
- In office 21 December 1975 – 24 March 1977
- Prime Minister: Indira Gandhi
- Preceded by: Self
- Succeeded by: Hemwati Nandan Bahuguna

Union Minister of Chemicals and Fertilizers
- In office 22 September 1976 – 24 March 1977
- Prime Minister: Indira Gandhi
- Preceded by: Prakash Chandra Sethi
- Succeeded by: Hemwati Nandan Bahuguna

Union Minister of Petroleum and Chemicals
- In office 10 October 1974 – 21 December 1975
- Prime Minister: Indira Gandhi
- Preceded by: D. K. Barooah
- Succeeded by: Self (Petroleum); Prakash Chandra Sethi (Chemicals)

Union Minister of Steel and Mines
- In office 11 January 1974 – 10 October 1974
- Prime Minister: Indira Gandhi
- Preceded by: T. A. Pai
- Succeeded by: Chandrajit Yadav

Union Minister for Mines and Fuel (Minister without cabinet rank)
- In office 10 April 1962 – 26 June 1963
- Prime Minister: Jawaharlal Nehru
- Preceded by: Swaran Singh
- Succeeded by: Swaran Singh

Union Minister for Mines and Oil (Minister without cabinet rank)
- In office 25 April 1957 – 10 April 1962
- Prime Minister: Jawaharlal Nehru

Union Minister of Natural Resources (Minister without cabinet rank)
- In office 8 January 1955 – 17 April 1957
- Prime Minister: Jawaharlal Nehru

Member of Parliament, Lok Sabha
- In office 1971–1977
- Preceded by: Narayan Swaroop Sharma
- Succeeded by: Madhav Prasad Tripathi
- Constituency: Domariyaganj
- In office 1957–1967
- Preceded by: Ram Garib
- Succeeded by: Sheo Narain
- Constituency: Basti
- In office 1952–1957
- Constituency: Gonda District (East) cum Basti District (West)

Personal details
- Born: 11 August 1904
- Died: 27 May 1981 (aged 76) New Delhi, India
- Party: Indian National Congress

Keshav Dev Malaviya (11 August 1904 – 27 May 1981) was a leader of Indian National Congress and a union minister of India. He was a member of Lok Sabha from Domariyaganj, Uttar Pradesh. He received his degree in oil technology from HBTI Kanpur (now HBTU Kanpur). He served as a Minister of Petroleum in the 1970s in the Congress government. He is also known as the Father of the Indian Petroleum Industry.

== Notes ==
- Reed, Stanley (1950). The Indian And Pakistan Year Book And Who's Who 1950. Bennett Coleman and Co. Ltd. p. 710.

In honour of K.D. Malaviya, Dibrugarh University, Assam has established a chair for research purpose in the department of Applied Geology, with collaboration with Oil India Ltd. Duliajan in 1991. This chair is dedicated for research in the field of oil and natural gas.
