= Rampal Singh (Uttar Pradesh politician) =

Indian politician (1930–2004)

Rampal Singh (1 September 1930 – 2019) was an Indian politician, belonging to Bhartiya Janata Party. In the 1991 election he was elected to the 10th Lok Sabha from the Domariyaganj Lok Sabha constituency of Uttar Pradesh. He was also member of 12th and 13th Lok Sabha from Domariyaganj.

Singh was born on 1 September 1930 in the village of Sikta in the Siddarthnagar district. He was an engineer and agriculturist by profession. Singh was married to Smt Prabhawati Devi. He has one son, Prem Prakash Singh and resided in the Siddharthnagar district. Singh died in 2019.
