= Mohammed Muqueem =

Indian politician (born 1953)

Mohammad Muqim

Member of Parliament, Lok Sabha
- In office 2004–2009
- Preceded by: Rampal Singh
- Succeeded by: Jagdambika Pal
- Constituency: Domariaganj

Personal details
- Born: 15 January 1953 (age 73) Siddharth Nagar, Uttar Pradesh, India
- Party: Bahujan Samaj Party
- Spouse: Sahida Mohammad Muqim
- As of 17 September, 2006

Mohammad Muqim (born 15 January 1953) is an Indian politician for the Domariaganj (Lok Sabha constituency) in Uttar Pradesh.
