= National Aluminium Company =

Indian mining and power corporation

National Aluminium Company Limited
- Type: Public
- Traded as: NSE: NATIONALUM; BSE: 532234
- Industry: Mining; Power
- Founded: 7 January 1981
- Headquarters: Bhubaneswar, Odisha, India
- Key people: Brijendra Pratap Singh (Chairman & MD)
- Products: Bauxite; Aluminium; Alumina Hydrate
- Revenue: ▲₹14,170 crore (US$1.5 billion) (FY22)
- Operating income: ▲₹3,677.12 crore (US$380 million) (FY22)
- Net income: ▲₹5,267.94 crore (US$550 million) (FY25)
- Total assets: ▼₹14,549.62 crore (US$1.5 billion) (2020)
- Total equity: ▼₹9,988.07 crore (US$1.0 billion) (2020)
- Owner: Government of India (51.28%)
- Number of employees: 6,496 (April 2019)
- Website: nalcoindia.com

National Aluminium Company Limited (abbreviated as NALCO; incorporated in 1981) is an Indian public sector company having integrated and diversified operations in mining, metal and power. Presently, the Government of India holds a 51.28% equity stake in NALCO, while the Ministry of Mines has administrative control over the company.

It is one of the largest integrated bauxite–alumina–aluminium–power complex in the country, encompassing bauxite mining, alumina refining, aluminium smelting and casting, power generation, rail and port operations.

== Operations ==
NALCO is headquartered at Bhubaneswar, Odisha.

NALCO operates from two major Units

- Mining and Refinery (M&R) complex
- Smelter and Power (S&P) complex
- Port Facilities at Visakhapatnam and Paradip.
- Wind Power Plants
  - Gandikota, Andhra Pradesh – 50.4 MW (2.1MW, 24 nos. WEGs)
  - Ludarwa, Jaisalmer, Rajasthan – 47.6 MW (0.85 MW, 56 nos. WEGs)
  - Devikot, Jaisalmer, Rajasthan – 50 MW (2 MW, 25 nos. WEG)
  - Sangli, Maharashtra – 50.4 MW (2.1MW, 24 nos. WEGs)
- Solar Power at Nalco Corporate Office, Bhubaneswar & NALCO Research & Technology Center, Bhubaneswar
- Regional offices at Kolkata, Mumbai, Delhi, Chennai & Bangalore
- 10 operating stockyards at various locations in the Country

== Products ==
Main products of NALCO are as follows:

Aluminium Metal

- Ingots
- Alloy Ingots
- T-Ingots
- Sows
- Billets
- Wire Rods
- Cast strips

Alumina & Hydrate

- Calcined Alumina
- Alumina Hydrate

Rolled Product

- Aluminium Rolled Products
- Aluminium Chequered Sheets

Power

- Thermal Power
- Co-generation Power
- Wind Power
- Solar Power

== Employees ==
As of June 2019, there were 6496 employees on the company's roll.

== Joint Venturess ==
- Utkarsha Aluminium Dhatu Nigam Limited is a joint venture of NALCO and MIDHANI.
- GACL-NALCO Alkalies & Chemicals Private Limited

== Right to Information Act ==
Since NALCO is a public authority, it comes under the Right to Information Act. Thus, NALCO is required to provide information to various RTI queries asked by general public.

== See also ==
- List of countries by aluminium production
- List of alumina refineries
- List of aluminium smelters
