= Jagdambika Pal =

Indian politician (born 1950)

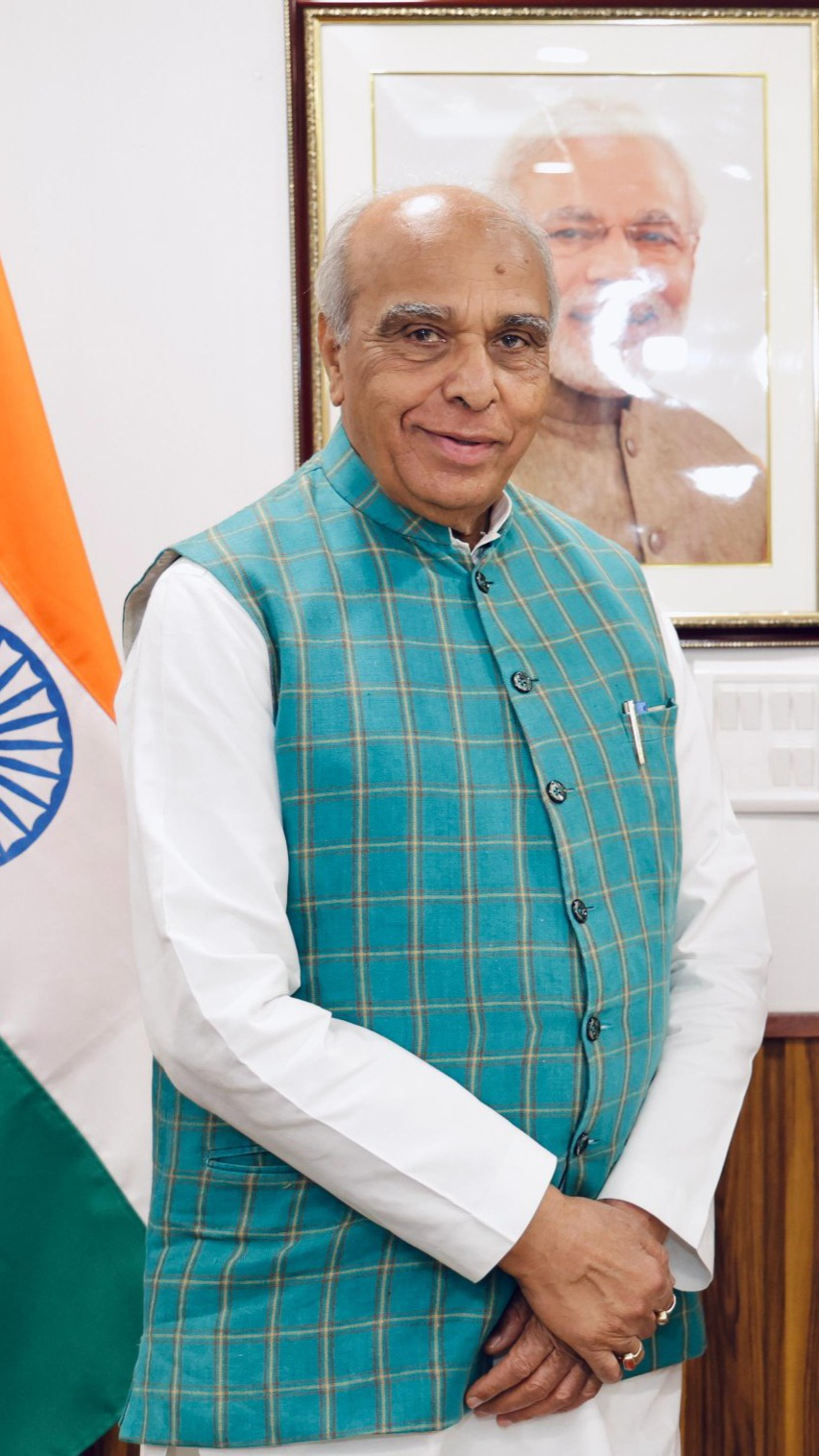
- Pal in May 2026

Member of Parliament, Lok Sabha
- Incumbent
- Assumed office 16 May 2009
- Preceded by: Mohammed Muqueem
- Constituency: Domariyaganj, Uttar Pradesh

Chairperson of the Joint Committee on the Waqf (Amendment) Bill, 2024
- Incumbent
- Assumed office 13 August 2024

Chief Minister of Uttar Pradesh
- In office 21 February 1998 – 23 February 1998
- Preceded by: Kalyan Singh
- Succeeded by: Kalyan Singh

President of Uttar Pradesh Congress Committee
- In office 30 May 2003 – 7 November 2004
- Preceded by: Arun Kumar Singh Munna
- Succeeded by: Salman Khurshid

Member of Uttar Pradesh Legislative Assembly
- In office 1993–2007
- Preceded by: Lakshameshwar Singh
- Succeeded by: Jeetender Kumar
- Constituency: Basti

Personal details
- Born: 21 October 1950 (age 76) Bharvaliya, Uttar Pradesh, India
- Party: Bharatiya Janata Party (since 2014)
- Other political affiliations: Indian National Congress (till 1996; 2002–2014); All India Indira Congress (Tiwari) (1996–1997); Akhil Bharatiya Loktantrik Congress (1997–2002)
- Spouse: Sneh Lata Pal (m. 1975)
- Children: 3 (1 son, 2 daughters)
- Parents: Late Shri Surya Bux Pal (father); Late Smt Moolraji Devi (mother)
- Education: MA & LLB
- Alma mater: Awadh University; Gorakhpur University; Lucknow University
- Profession: Advocate

Jagdambika Pal (born 21 October 1950) is an Indian politician and advocate belonging to the Bharatiya Janata Party (BJP). He is currently serving as a member of the Lok Sabha representing the Domariyaganj constituency since 2009. Initially, he represented the Indian National Congress in the 15th Lok Sabha until his resignation on 7 March 2014, after which he joined the BJP and won subsequent elections.

He served as the Chief Minister of Uttar Pradesh for the shortest tenure (just over 24 hours) in February 1998. In August 2024, he was appointed as the Chairperson of the high-profile Joint Parliamentary Committee (JPC) on the Waqf (Amendment) Bill, 2024.

== Early life and education ==
Jagdambika Pal was born on 21 October 1950 in Bharvaliya village, Basti district, Uttar Pradesh to Late Shri Surya Bux Pal and Late Smt Moolraji Devi. He completed his higher education earning a Master of Arts (M.A.) in Political Science, Ancient & Modern History, and an LL.B. degree. He completed his education from Awadh University, Gorakhpur University, and Lucknow University. He married Sneh Lata Pal on 13 July 1975, and the couple has one son and two daughters.

== Political career ==
He started his political career with the Indian National Congress. He later left to join the All India Indira Congress (Tiwari) led by N. D. Tiwari. In 1997, he co-founded the Akhil Bharatiya Loktantrik Congress along with Naresh Agarwal and Rajeev Shukla, becoming the Transport Minister under the Kalyan Singh-led government. He eventually returned to the Congress party and served as the President of the Uttar Pradesh state unit of the Indian National Congress (UPCC) from 2003 to 2004.

In 2009, he won the Lok Sabha election from Domariyaganj on a Congress ticket. However, just before the 2014 general elections, he resigned from the Lok Sabha and the Congress party to join the Bharatiya Janata Party (BJP). He retained his Domariyaganj seat in 2014, 2019, and the 2024 general elections under the BJP banner.

=== As Acting Chief Minister of Uttar Pradesh ===
When the Uttar Pradesh state government led by Kalyan Singh was dismissed on 21 February 1998 by Governor of Uttar Pradesh Romesh Bhandari, Jagdambika Pal was sworn in as the Acting Chief Minister. However, Kalyan Singh immediately challenged the dismissal in the Allahabad High Court. The court deemed the Governor's decision unconstitutional on 23 February 1998 and ordered a floor-test, reinstating the Kalyan Singh government and ending Pal's 24-hour tenure.

=== Parliamentary committees and Waqf JPC ===
Pal has chaired several parliamentary panels, including the Standing Committee on Energy and the Standing Committee on Housing and Urban Affairs. On 13 August 2024, Lok Sabha Speaker Om Birla appointed Jagdambika Pal as the Chairperson of the Joint Parliamentary Committee (JPC) to examine the contentious Waqf (Amendment) Bill, 2024, conducting public hearings across the nation.

== Positions held ==
- 1982–1993: Member, Uttar Pradesh Legislative Council (two terms)
- 1988–1999: Minister of State, Government of Uttar Pradesh
- 1993–2007: Member, Uttar Pradesh Legislative Assembly (three terms from Basti constituency)
- 1998: Chief Minister, Government of Uttar Pradesh (shortest tenure)
- 2002: Cabinet Minister, Government of Uttar Pradesh
- 2003–2004: President, Uttar Pradesh Congress Committee (UPCC)
- 2009: Elected to 15th Lok Sabha from Domariyaganj (INC)
  - Chairman, Committee on Public Undertakings (2011–2014)
  - Member, Committee on Energy, Petitions, and MPLADs
- 2014: Re-elected to 16th Lok Sabha from Domariyaganj (BJP)
  - Member, Standing Committee on Energy
- 2019: Re-elected to 17th Lok Sabha from Domariyaganj (BJP)
  - Chairperson, Standing Committee on Housing and Urban Affairs (2019–2022)
  - Chairperson, Standing Committee on Energy (2022–2024)
- 2024: Re-elected to 18th Lok Sabha from Domariyaganj (BJP)
  - Chairperson, Joint Committee on The Waqf (Amendment) Bill, 2024 (Assumed 13 August 2024)
  - Member, Committee on Public Accounts, Energy, and Science & Technology
