= Jai Pratap Singh =

Indian politician (born 1953)

Minister of Health & Family Welfare, Government of Uttar Pradesh
- In office 21 August 2019 – 25 March 2022
- Chief Minister: Yogi Adityanath
- Preceded by: Sidharth Nath Singh
- Succeeded by: Brajesh Pathak

Minister of Excise & Liquor Prohibition, Government of Uttar Pradesh
- In office 19 March 2017 – 21 August 2019
- Chief Minister: Yogi Adityanath
- Succeeded by: Ram Naresh Agnihotri

Member of Uttar Pradesh Legislative Assembly
- Incumbent
- Assumed office 2012
- Preceded by: Lalji Yadav
- Constituency: Bansi
- In office 1989–2007
- Preceded by: Harish Chandra Srivastava
- Succeeded by: Lalji Yadav
- Constituency: Bansi

Personal details
- Born: 7 September 1953 (age 73) Dumraon, Bihar, India
- Party: Bharatiya Janta Party
- Spouse: Basundhara Kumari (m. 1983)
- Children: 2
- Parent: Rudra Pratap Singh (father)
- Education: KC College (B. A.)
- Profession: Politician

Jai Pratap Singh (born 7 September 1953) is an Indian politician serving as the Minister of Medical and Health, Family Welfare, Mother and Child Welfare in the Yogi Adityanath ministry of the Uttar Pradesh Government. He is a member of 17th Legislative Assembly of Uttar Pradesh and was a member of 10th, 11th, 12th, 13th, 14th and 16th Legislative Assemblies of Uttar Pradesh. He is a member of Bharatiya Janta Party. He was elected to Uttar Pradesh Legislative Assembly seven times from Bansi constituency of Siddharthnagar district.

== Personal life ==
Singh was born on 7 September 1953 to Raja Rudra Pratap Singh in Dumraon, Bihar. He completed his Higher Secondary studies from Mayo College, Ajmer in 1970 and graduated with Bachelor of Arts (Honours) from KC College, Bombay in 1974. Singh married Basundhara Kumari on 19 January 1983, with whom he has two sons. He is a farmer by profession and is a resident of Rajmahal, Bansi, Siddharthnagar district.

== Political career ==
Jai Pratap Singh has been a MLA seven straight times. Since 1989, he represented the Bansi (Assembly constituency) as a member of the Bhartiya Janata Party.

In Seventeenth Legislative Assembly of Uttar Pradesh (2017) elections, he defeated his nearest rival Samajwadi Party candidate Lal Ji by a margin of 18,942 votes. After winning for seventh time, he was appointed Cabinet minister of Excise and Liquor Prohibition in Government of Uttar Pradesh.

On 21 August 2019, After first cabinet expansion of Yogi Adityanath his ministry department changed as Minister of Medical and Health, Family Welfare, Mother and Child Welfare.

== Posts held ==
#	From	To	Position	Comments
01	1989	1991	Member, 10th Legislative Assembly of Uttar Pradesh	
02	1991	1992	Member, 11th Legislative Assembly of Uttar Pradesh	
03	1993	1995	Member, 12th Legislative Assembly of Uttar Pradesh	
04	1996	2002	Member, 13th Legislative Assembly of Uttar Pradesh	
05	2002	2007	Member, 14th Legislative Assembly of Uttar Pradesh	
06	2012	2017	Member, 16th Legislative Assembly of Uttar Pradesh	
07	2017	Incumbent	Member, 17th Legislative Assembly of Uttar Pradesh	
08	2017	Incumbent	Cabinet Minister in Government of Uttar Pradesh	
