= Moharam (family) =

Egyptian family of Qahtanite Arab origin

Moharam family المحارمة
- Aristocratic, Tribal
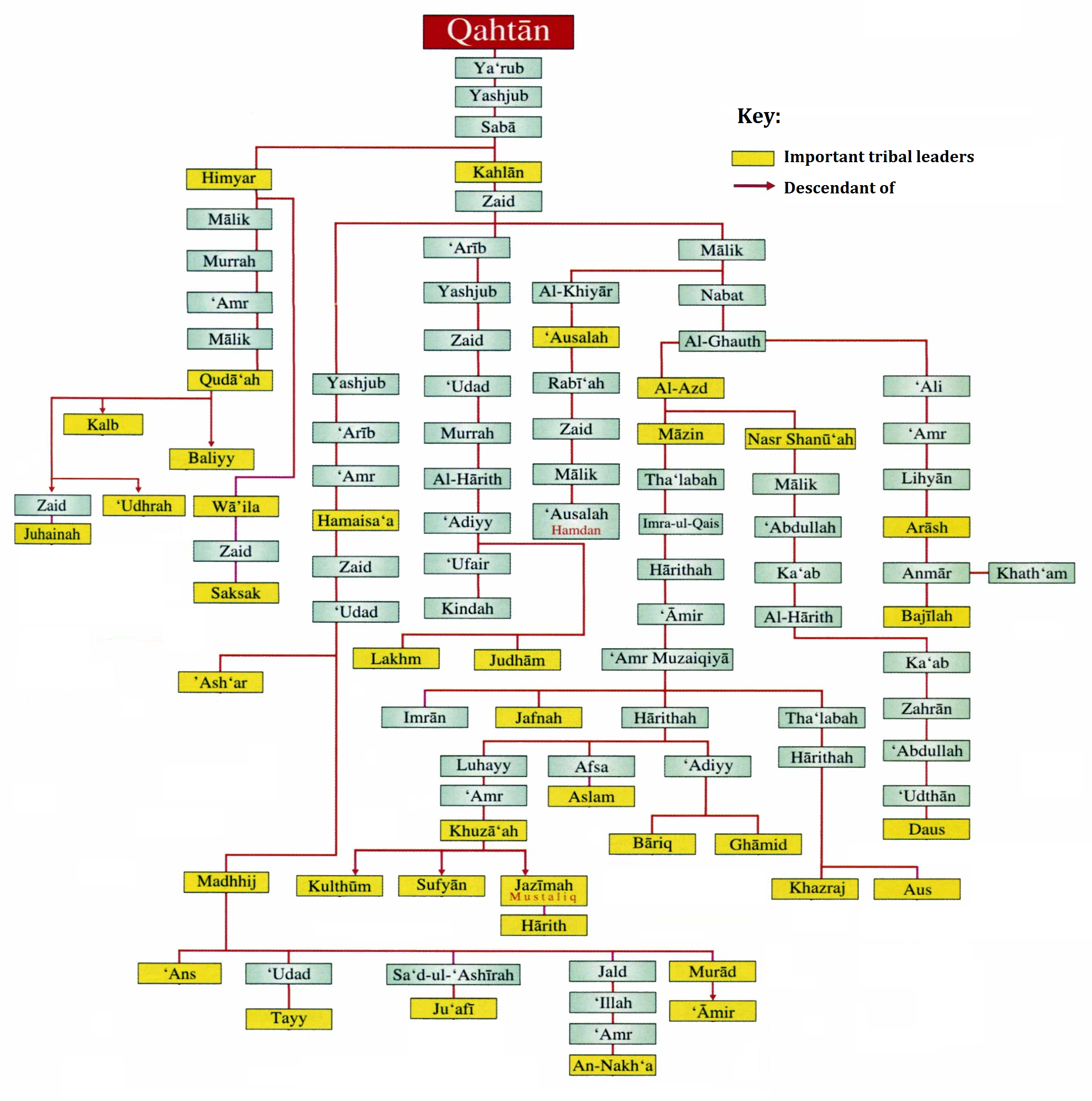
- Country: Egypt
- Current region: Al Sharkia Governorate, Egypt
- Origin: Qahtanite Arabs, Yemen
- Founded: 639 AD (Arab conquest of Egypt)

Moharam of Judham of Murrah of Sheba of Kahlan of Qahtanite origin (also Moharram, Muharram, Aal Moharam, Aal Maharema) (Arabic: مُحَرَّم or المحارمة) is a family lineage from Egypt with ancestors from Yemen.

The family descends from Moharram from Judham (Jutham) (جذام) ibn Uday ibn Hareth of Murrah ibn Adad ibn Yashjob ibn Oreib ibn Zeid of Kahlan of Sheba (Sabaa') of Yashgiob of Yareeb from Qahtan from the Arab peninsula (Arabic: بنو جذام (عمرو) بن عدي بن الحارث بن مرة بن أدد بن زيد بن يشجب بن عريب بن زيد بن كهلان بن سبأ بن يشجب بن يعرب بن قحطان)

From Judham descend the dynasties Hud (Banu Hud) and Martinez who ruled Andalusia and Valencia.

Moharam first entered Egypt with the Arab conquest of Egypt in December 639 with Amr Bin-Al Aas, settled in Kafr Ali Kaly (قرية كفر على غالى) Al Sharkia, and owned lands. Saladin granted them more lands, which they still hold today. Moharram in Egypt comprises five houses: Soweid, Baagah, Nathel, Refaa, and Bardaa (سويد، وبعجة، وناثل، ورفاعة، وبردعة )

Flag of Egypt's Al Sharkia Governorate, First home of Moharam in Egypt

Although the family settled in Al-sharkia in Egypt, they eventually spread over Egypt and over the middle east, especially in Jordan and Syria.

The major cause of their spread into Egypt was their refusal to pay taxes in the era of Muhammad Ali of Egypt, who ordered the destruction of their houses. Once they heard that the army was marching towards their homes, they abandoned them and took refuge in the neighboring cities.

After the campaign, some of the family houses returned to Al-sharkia while others made their homes in other places in Egypt.
