= Wasa Dargah =

Wasa Dargah is a village in Siddharthnagar District, Uttar Pradesh, India.
