= Raghvendra Pratap Singh (Uttar Pradesh politician) =

Indian politician

MLA in 17th Legislative Assembly of Uttar Pradesh
- In office March 2017 – March 2022
- Preceded by: Malik Mohd Kamal Yusuf
- Constituency: Domariyaganj

Personal details
- Born: 1 April 1966 (age 60) Basti, Uttar Pradesh
- Party: Bharatiya Janata Party
- Parent: Shankar Baksh Singh
- Education: Bachelor of Arts
- Alma mater: Deen Dayal Upadhyay Gorakhpur University
- Occupation: MLA
- Profession: Politician

Raghvendra Pratap Singh is an Indian politician and a member of 17th Legislative Assembly of Uttar Pradesh of India. He represents the Domariyaganj (Assembly constituency) in Siddharthnagar district of Uttar Pradesh and is a member of the Bharatiya Janata Party.

== Early life and education ==
Singh was born 1 April 1966 in Basti district of Uttar Pradesh to father Shankar Baksh Singh. In 1987, he married Vijay Laxmi Singh, they have one son and one daughter. He belongs to General Class (Kshatriya) community. In 1986, he attended Deen Dayal Upadhyay Gorakhpur University and attained Bachelor of Arts degree.

== Political career ==
Singh started his political career in 16th Legislative Assembly of Uttar Pradesh (2012) elections, he contested from Domariyaganj (Assembly constituency) as a member of Bharatiya Janata Party. But he lost this election to Peace Party candidate Malik Mohd Kamal Yusuf and stood on fourth position with 25,209 (14.26%) votes.

In 17th Legislative Assembly of Uttar Pradesh (2017) elections, he was elected MLA from Domariyaganj by defeating Bahujan Samaj Party candidate Saiyada Khatoon by a margin of 171 votes (lowest margin in 2017 assembly election).

== Posts held ==
#	From	To	Position	Comments
01	March 2017	March 2022	Member, 17th Legislative Assembly of Uttar Pradesh	
