= Domariaganj =

Town in Uttar Pradesh, India

Domariyaganj
- Town
- Location in Uttar Pradesh, India Domariyaganj (India) Domariyaganj (Asia)
- Coordinates: 27.22°N 82.67°E
- Country: India
- State: Uttar Pradesh
- District: Siddharthnagar
- Established: 1800

Government
  - Nagar Panchayat Chairman: Atiqurrahman

Area
  - Total: 5 km^{2} (1.9 sq mi)
- Elevation: 88 m (289 ft)

Population (2023)
  - Total: 41,000
  - Density: 8,200/km^{2} (21,000/sq mi)

Language
  - Official: Hindi
  - Additional official: Urdu
- Time zone: UTC+5:30 (IST)
- Postal code: 272189
- Vehicle registration: UP-55
- Website: sidharthnagar.nic.in

Domariaganj is a town and tehsil of Siddharthnagar district in eastern Uttar Pradesh. It is located on the bank of the river Rapti, 30 km south of the Nepal border.

Domariaganj is also the name of one of the 80 Lok Sabha (parliamentary) constituencies in Uttar Pradesh. This constituency covers the entire Siddharthnagar district.

Siddharthnagar is one of the 75 districts of Uttar Pradesh, which is located in northern India. The district is 2,895 km2 and is surrounded by other districts of Uttar Pradesh.

== History ==
The region was under the rule of Kalhans dynasty based at modern Chaukhara. Maharaja Kesri Singh was the last ruler of Kalhans dynasty based at Chaukhara.

== Geography ==
Domariaganj is located at 27.22°N 82.67°E. It has an average elevation of 88 m (289 ft).

== Administration ==
Domariyaganj Lok Sabha constituency is one of the 80 Lok Sabha (parliamentary) constituencies in Uttar Pradesh.

== See also ==
- Domariaganj (Lok Sabha constituency)
- Hallaur
- Wasa Dargah
