= Siddharthnagar =

City and district headquarters in Uttar Pradesh, India

- City and district headquarters
- Siddharthnagar (Naugarh)
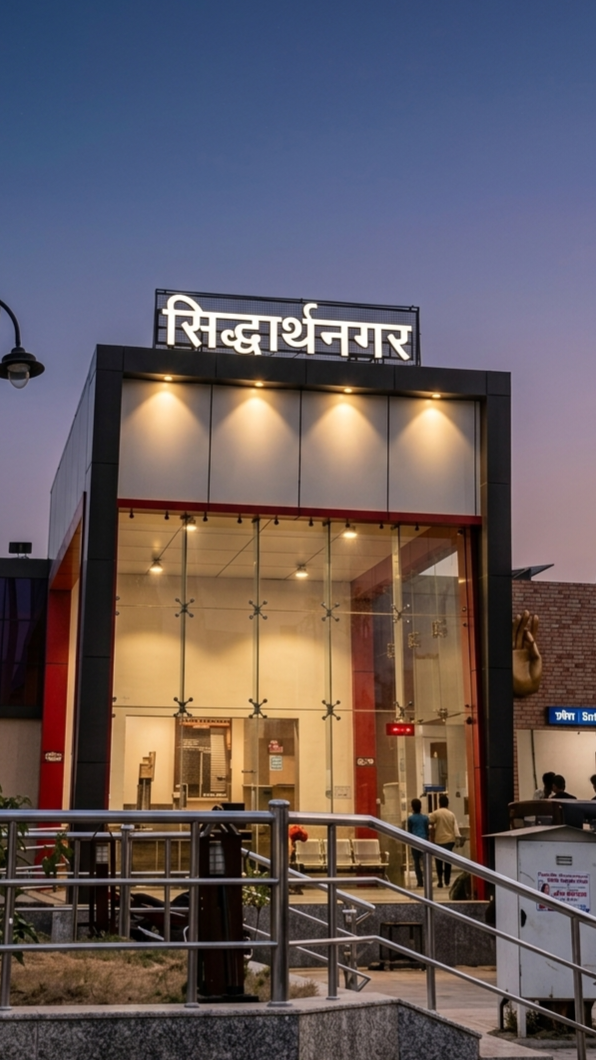
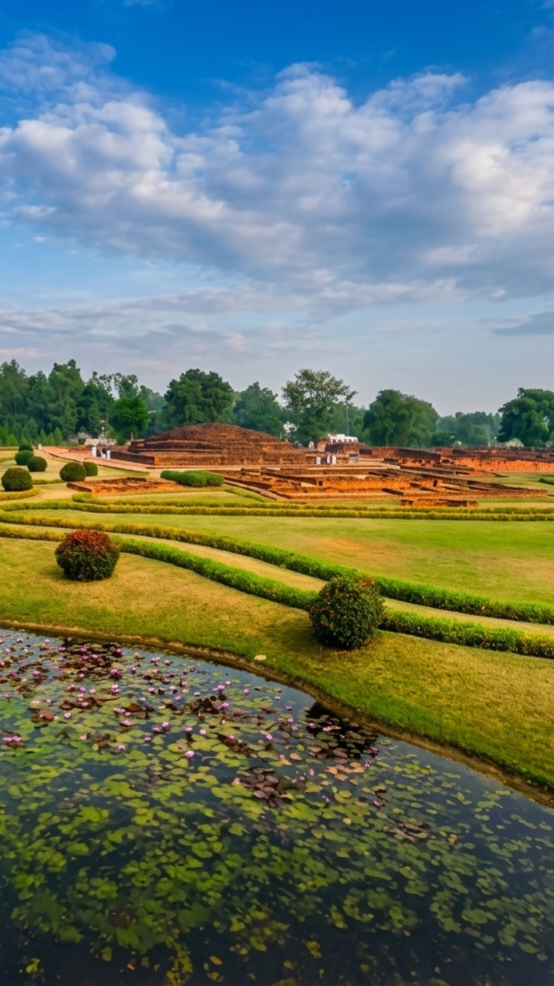
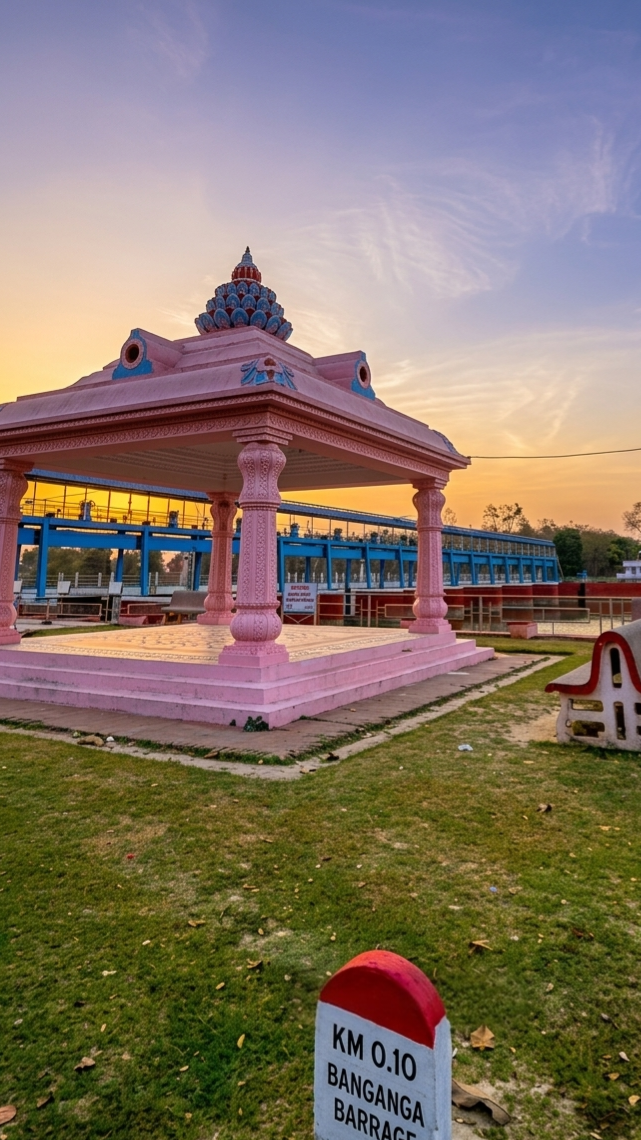
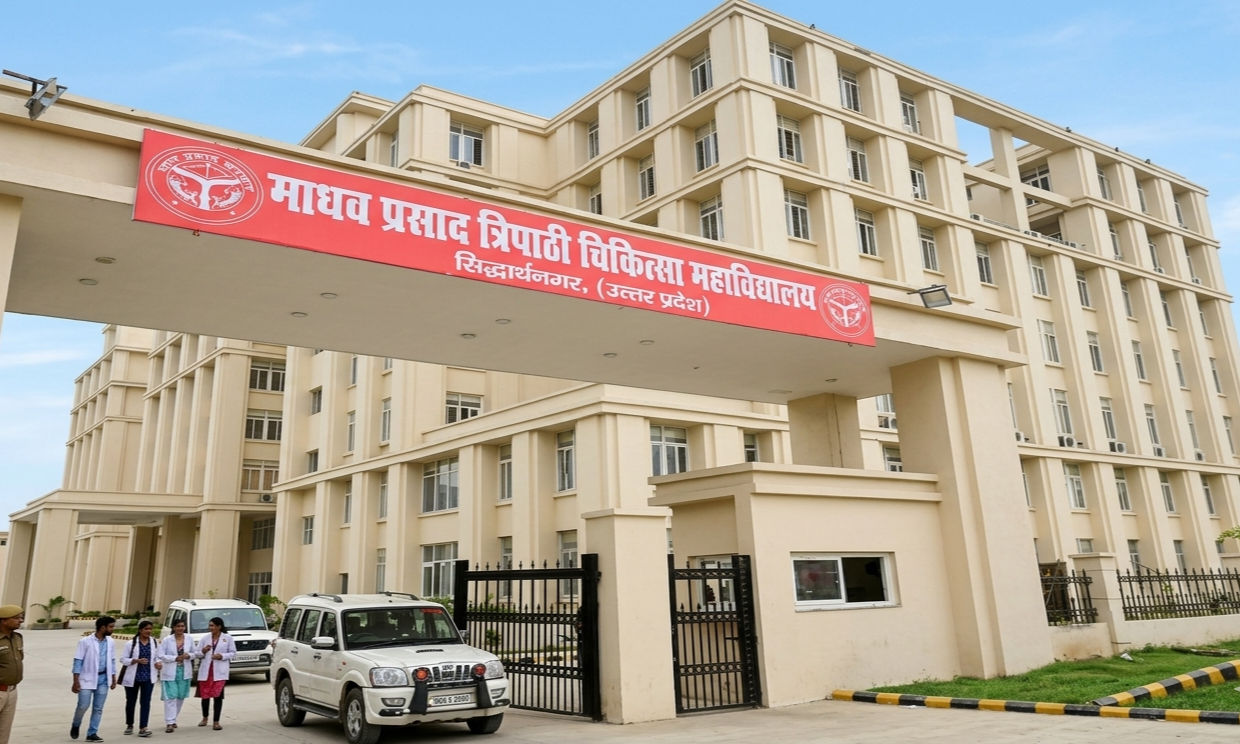
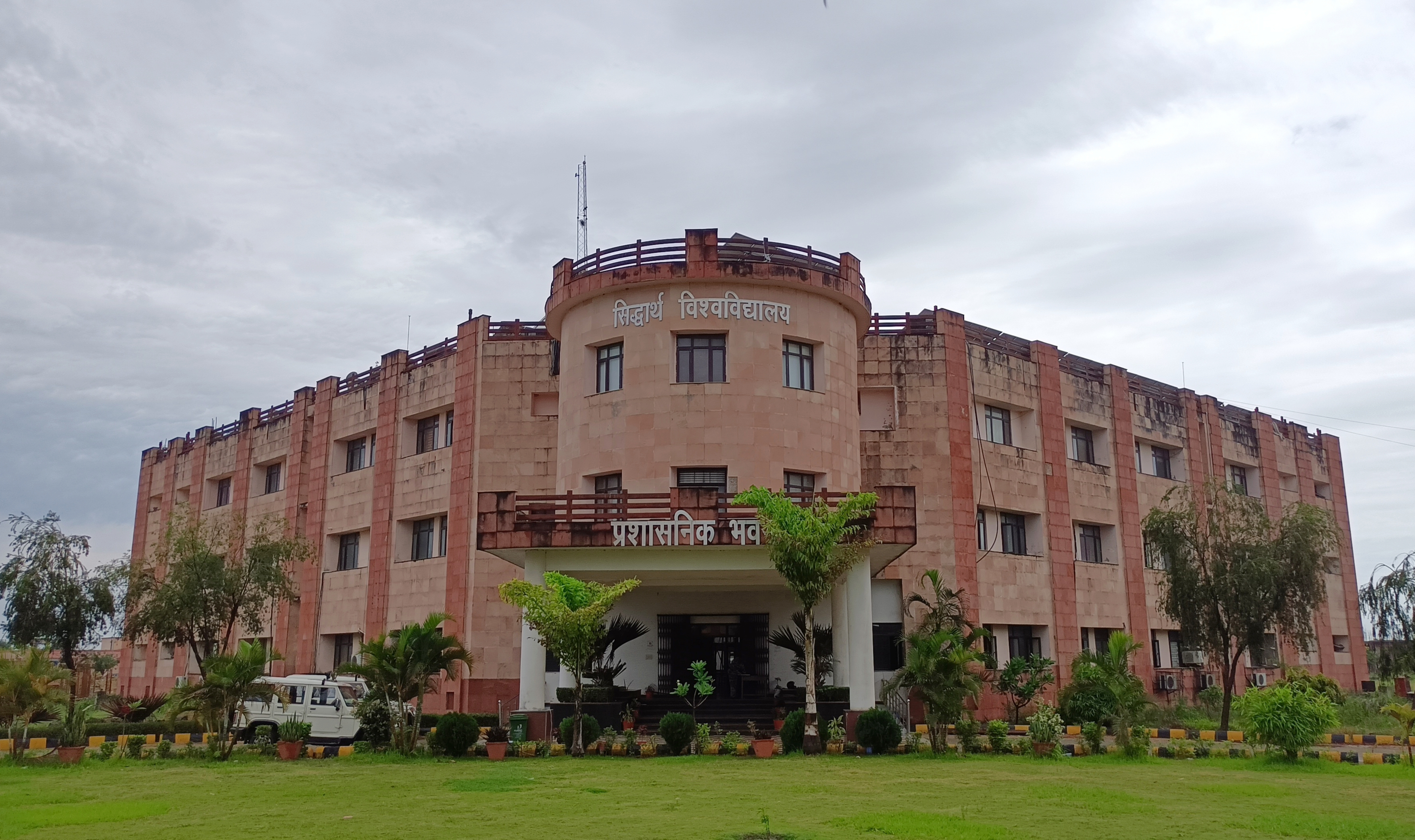
- Clockwise from top: Siddharthnagar railway station, Kapilavastu, Banganga Barrage, Siddharth University, and Madhav Prasad Tripathi Medical College, Siddharthnagar
- Nickname: Naugarh
- Location in Uttar Pradesh, India Siddharthnagar (India)
- Coordinates: 27.3005°N 83.0945°E
- Country: India
- State: Uttar Pradesh
- Division: Basti
- District: Siddharthnagar district
- District established: 29 December 1988

Government
  - Type: Municipal council
  - Body: Siddharthnagar Nagar Palika Parishad
- Elevation: 89 m (292 ft)

Population (2011)
  - Total: 25,422

Languages
  - Official: Hindi
  - Additional official: Urdu
  - Regional: Bhojpuri, Awadhi
- Time zone: UTC+5:30 (IST)
- PIN: 272207
- Telephone code: 05544
- Vehicle registration: UP-55
- Website: siddharthnagar.nic.in

Siddharthnagar, also known as Naugarh, is a city and the district headquarters of Siddharthnagar district in the Purvanchal region of Uttar Pradesh, India.

The city is named after Prince Siddhartha, the childhood name of Gautama Buddha. The nearby archaeological site of Kapilavastu is associated with the early life of the Buddha.

== History ==
Siddharthnagar district was established on 29 December 1988 after being separated from Basti district. Naugarh became the district headquarters following the district's formation.

The region historically formed part of the ancient Shakya republic and is closely linked with Buddhist heritage sites around Kapilavastu and Piprahwa.

== Demographics ==
According to the 2011 Census of India, Siddharthnagar city had a population of 25,422, including 13,071 males and 12,351 females.

Historical population
Census year	Population	±%
1991	17,245	—
2001	22,320	+29.4%
2011	25,422	+13.9%

=== Religion ===
Religion in Siddharthnagar city (2011 Census)
Religion	Percent
Hinduism	63.26%
Islam	35.96%
Sikhism	0.48%
Christianity	0.14%
Buddhism	0.06%
Jainism	0.01%
Religion not stated	0.08%

== Languages ==
Hindi is the official language of Siddharthnagar, while Urdu is also widely used in administration, education, literature, and local communication.

Regional languages spoken in the area include Bhojpuri and Awadhi.

=== Urdu ===
Urdu has a notable literary and cultural presence in Siddharthnagar district and is commonly spoken among local communities.

== Administration ==
Siddharthnagar city is governed by the Siddharthnagar Nagar Palika Parishad and serves as the administrative headquarters of the district.

== Economy ==
Agriculture remains the backbone of the regional economy. Rice, wheat, sugarcane, and pulses are major agricultural products cultivated in surrounding rural areas.

== Education ==
- Siddharth University is a state university located at Kapilvastu, Siddharthnagar.
- Madhav Prasad Tripathi Medical College is an autonomous state medical college located in Siddharthnagar city.

== Transport ==
=== Rail ===
Siddharthnagar railway station serves the city under the North Eastern Railway zone of Indian Railways.

=== Road ===
Siddharthnagar is connected with eastern Uttar Pradesh and the Indo–Nepal border region through national and state highways.

National Highway 28 (NH-28) originates near Kakrahawa on the India–Nepal border and passes through Siddharthnagar, Bansi, Rudhauli, Basti, Tanda, Atraulia, Azamgarh, Katghar, Lalganj, Lamhi, and Varanasi.

National Highway 730 connects Siddharthnagar district with Shohratgarh, Balrampur, Bahraich, and adjoining Terai regions.

A major state highway passing through Mohana connects Siddharthnagar district with Maharajganj via Nichlaul and nearby areas.

== Tourism ==
- Kapilavastu
- Piprahwa
- Banganga Barrage
- Aligarhwa archaeological park
- Siddharth University

== Healthcare System ==
The healthcare infrastructure consists of:

- Madhav Prasad Tripathi State Allopathic Medical College and Hospital: It acts as the premier healthcare institution providing advanced medical treatments and emergency facilities for the district.

== Economy ==
Kalanamak Rice (ODOP): Agriculture is the backbone of the district. Siddharthnagar is globally famous for Kalanamak Rice, a rare, highly aromatic, and nutritious black-husked rice variety. It has been designated as the district's signature product under the Uttar Pradesh government's "One District One Product" (ODOP) scheme, boosting local agro-processing, branding, and exports.

Sharing a long international border with Nepal, border check posts like Barhni and Khunwa serve as trade gateways. This proximity drives a transit economy based on textiles, food grains, and consumer goods.

== See also ==
- Birdpur
- Domariaganj
- Piprahwa
- Shohratgarh
- Siddharthnagar district
- Kapilavastu (ancient city)
- Piprahwa
- Shohratgarh
- Bansi, Uttar Pradesh
