= Biskohar (Siddharth Nagar) =

Village and market in Uttar Pradesh, India

Biskohar Biskohar Bazar
- Town / Market / Nagar Panchayat
- Location in Uttar Pradesh, India
- Coordinates: 27°20′0″N 82°42′0″E
- Country: India
- State: Uttar Pradesh
- District: Siddharthnagar

Languages
  - Official: Hindi, Awadhi, English
- Time zone: UTC+5:30 (IST)
- PIN: 272192
- Vehicle registration: UP 55

Biskohar bazar is a town and market in Itwa block in Sidhdharthnagar district, Basti division, Uttar Pradesh state of India. Biskohar is situated 209 km from the State's Capital City Lucknow.

== Administration ==
There is one Parliamentary constituency named Domariaganj and five Assembly constituencies in the district namely Domariaganj, Itwa, Shoratgarh, Kapilvastu and Bansi. Biskohar comes under Itwa (Assembly constituency). MLA (Member of Legislative Assembly of the Itwa constituencies is: Mata Prasad Pandey, and Member of Parliament is Shri Jagdambika Pal from Bharatiya Janata Party.
