= Siddharth Nagar =

Siddharth Nagar or Siddartha Nagar may refer to:

- Siddharthnagar, formerly Naugarh, a city in Siddharthnagar district, Uttar Pradesh, India
  - Siddharthnagar district, a district centred on the above town; in Basti division, Uttar Pradesh, India
  - Siddharthnagar railway station, a Railway station in Uttar Pradesh, India
- Siddhartha Nagar, a suburb of Mysore, Karnataka, India
- Siddharth Nagar, Nepal
