= Chilhiya, Uttar Pradesh =

Village in Siddharthnagar district, Uttar Pradesh, India

Chilhiya
- Village
- Location in Uttar Pradesh, India Chilhiya (India)
- Coordinates: 27.2925°N 83.1085°E
- Country: India
- State: Uttar Pradesh
- District: Siddharthnagar district
- Tehsil: Shohratgarh

Government
  - Type: Gram Panchayat
  - Body: Chilhiya Gram Panchayat
- Elevation: 92 m (302 ft)

Population (2011)
  - Total: 4,464

Languages
  - Official: Hindi
  - Regional: Awadhi, Bhojpuri, Urdu
- Time zone: UTC+5:30 (IST)
- PIN: 272204
- Vehicle registration: UP-55
- Lok Sabha constituency: Domariyaganj Lok Sabha constituency
- Vidhan Sabha constituency: Shohratgarh Assembly constituency

Chilhiya is a village and gram panchayat in Shohratgarh tehsil of Siddharthnagar district in the Indian state of Uttar Pradesh. The village is situated in the Terai region near the India–Nepal border in eastern Uttar Pradesh.

== Geography ==
Chilhiya is located approximately 7 kilometres from Shohratgarh town and around 16 kilometres from Naugarh, the district headquarters of Siddharthnagar district. The village lies in the fertile Gangetic plains region and has an average elevation of about 92 metres above sea level. The climate of the region is sub-tropical, and the area experiences extreme weather events including lightning activities during the monsoon season.

== Demographics ==
According to the 2011 Census of India, Chilhiya had a total population of 4,464 people living in 699 households. The male population was 2,288 while the female population was 2,176.

The literacy rate of the village was recorded at 62.92%, with male literacy higher than female literacy.

== Administration and law ==
Chilhiya is governed through the Gram Panchayat system under the Panchayati Raj framework of Uttar Pradesh. The village falls under Shohratgarh Assembly constituency and Domariyaganj Lok Sabha constituency.

The village houses its own local police station, known as the Chilhiya Thana, which serves as the primary law enforcement agency for the village and surrounding rural areas under the Siddharthnagar Police administration. In late 2024, the station came under public and media scrutiny following independent news investigations into administrative transparency and local policing practices.

== Economy ==
Agriculture is the main occupation of the residents. Major crops cultivated in the village include wheat, rice, pulses and sugarcane. Dairy farming and small-scale local trade also contribute to the rural economy. Financial services in the village are supported by a dedicated branch of the State Bank of India (SBI) located within Chilhiya, which serves the banking and transactional needs of the local population.

== Transport ==
The village has a dedicated railway station named Chilhia railway station (station code: CIH), which connects the locality to the Gorakhpur–Anandnagar–Gonda loop line, providing direct rail transport access to nearby towns and major cities. In December 2024, the Ministry of Railways initiated further development in the region when the Union Minister of State for Railways laid the foundation stone for a new road underbridge in the Siddharthnagar district to enhance regional connectivity and safety. Local road transport and minor routes further connect Chilhiya to Shohratgarh and Naugarh.

== Education ==
Chilhiya has primary educational institutions and nearby access to secondary and higher education facilities in Shohratgarh and Naugarh.

== Culture ==
The culture of Chilhiya reflects the traditions of eastern Uttar Pradesh. Festivals such as Holi, Diwali, Eid al-Fitr and Muharram are celebrated in the village. Bhojpuri and Awadhi cultural influences are visible in local customs and language.

== See also ==
- Shohratgarh
- Siddharthnagar district
- Uttar Pradesh
