= Khajuria Sarki =

Village in Uttar Pradesh, India

Khajuriya Sarki
- Village
- Location within Uttar Pradesh
- Coordinates: 27°26′49″N 82°47′30″E
- Country: India
- State: Uttar Pradesh
- District: Siddharthnagar

Languages
  - Official: Hindi, Urdu
- Time zone: UTC+5:30 (IST)

Khajuriya Sarki is a village near Dhebarua in Shoratgarh Assembly Constituency of Siddharthnagar District, Uttar Pradesh state, India. The village has a nearby railway station Barhni on the Gorakhpur–Gonda Indian Railways. It is 6 km from the Nepal border Krishnanagar (JhandeNagar).

== Demographics ==
Khajuriya Sarki is a village located in Shohratgarh of Siddharth Nagar district, Uttar Pradesh with total 334 families residing. The Khajuriya Sarki village has a population of 2562 of which 1292 are males while 1270 are females as per Population Census 2011.

In Khajuriya Sarki village population of children with age 0–6 is 556 which makes up 21.70% of total population of the village. The average sex ratio of Khajuriya Sarki village is 983 which is higher than the Uttar Pradesh state average of 912. The child sex ratio for the Khajuriya Sarki as per census is 993, higher than Uttar Pradesh's average of 902.

Khajuriya Sarki village has a lower literacy rate compared to Uttar Pradesh. In 2011, literacy rate of Khajuriya Sarki village was 60.82% compared to 67.68% of Uttar Pradesh. In Khajuriya Sarki, male literacy stands at 73.84% while female literacy rate was 47.53%.

== District ==
Siddharthnagar district was carved out on 29 December 1988 by bifurcating Basti district. The new district comprised the northern part of the erstwhile Basti district.
