= Dhanghata, Siddharthanagar =

Dhanghata
- village
- Location in Uttar Pradesh, India Dhanghata (India)
- Coordinates: 27.06325°N 82.47597°E
- Country: India
- State: Uttar Pradesh
- District: Siddharthnagar district
- Talukas: Bansi

Government
  - Type: Democracy
  - Body: Gram panchayat

Population (2011)
  - Total: 571

Languages
  - Official: Hindi
- Time zone: UTC+5:30 (IST)
- PIN: 272153
- Vehicle registration: UP 55
- Sex ratio: 1.032 (2011) ♀/♂
- Nearest city: Bansi
- Lok Sabha constituency: Domariyaganj
- Vidhan Sabha constituency: Bansi

Dhanghata is a small village located in Bansi Tehsil of Siddharth Nagar district, Uttar Pradesh state of India. It belongs to the Basti division. It is located 40 km west of District headquarters Naugarh and 225 km from State capital Lucknow. It is located on west side of the state highway between Basti and Lumbini.

== Geography ==
Dhanghata village lies at 27°06'32.5"N 82°47'59.7"E.It is part of Purvanchal.It is surrounded by other village in East Kotiya Gadori, North Jhungwa Gadori.

== Demographic ==
According to the 2011 census Dhanghata Village has a population of 571 with a total of 76 families residing of which 281 are males while 290 are females as per Population Census 2011. Official language of Village is Hindi.people generally talks in Awadhi Language. The number of children of age 0-6 is 99 which makes up 17.34% of total population of village. Average Sex Ratio, expressed as the number of women per thousand men, of Dhanghata village is 1032 which is higher than Uttar Pradesh state average of 912. Child Sex Ratio for the Dhanghata as per census is 1106, higher than Uttar Pradesh average of 902. As per constitution of India and Panchyati Raaj Act, Dhanghata village is administrated by Sarpanch (Head of Village) who is elected representative of village.

== Religion ==
The majority of the people are Hindus, most of the rest being Buddhists. Hindu Festivals like Deepawali, Holi and Dusherra are celebrated here and every year Ramleela is organised by the village people in February–March.

== Education System ==
There are 2 primary schools in the village. One from Basic to Class 5th and other from 6th to 8th. For further studies there are colleges near to the village.

- Adarsh Inter College Gaura Garh Siddharthnagar
- Pandit Vishwambhar Nath Tripathi Adarsh I C Manjhariya S.Nagar

== Literacy ==
In Dhanghata village, Dhanghata village has higher literacy rate compared to Uttar Pradesh. In 2011, literacy rate of Dhanghata village was 77.33% compared to 67.68% of Uttar Pradesh. In Dhanghata Male literacy stands at 86.75% while female literacy rate was 68.07%.

== Work Profile ==
In Dhanghata village out of total population, 163 were engaged in work activities. 27.61% of workers describe their work as Main Work (Employment or Earning more than 6 Months) while 72.39% were involved in Marginal activity providing livelihood for less than 6 months. Of 163 workers engaged in Main Work, 2 were cultivators (owner or co-owner) while 12 were Agricultural labourer.
