= Mahadev Ghurhu =

- Town
- Location in Uttar Pradesh, India
- Coordinates: 27°20′0″N 82°42′0″E
- Country: India
- State: Uttar Pradesh
- District: Siddharth Nagar
- Founder: Mahadev Lal Srivastava and Ghurhu Prasad Srivastava
- Named for: Mahadev Ghurhu

Government
  - Type: Urban

Languages
  - Official: Hindi, Awadhi, English, Bhojpuri
- Time zone: UTC+5:30 (IST)
- PIN: 272192
- Vehicle registration: UP 55

Mahadev Ghurhu is a town in the Siddharth Nagar district of the state of Uttar Pradesh, India. It is situated 170 km (110 mi) from the state's capital city of Lucknow.

Mahadev Ghurhu is 4 km (2.5 mi) from Itwa, 65 kilometers from Basti and 120 kilometers from Gorakhpur. The nearest railway station is Barhni which is 25 kilometers from Mahadev Ghurhu. It is on the Gonda-Gorakhpur loop line and is being converted into broad gauge line. Another nearby railway station is at Basti, which is well connected to Delhi, Mumbai, Lucknow, Gorakhpur etc.
