= Dharamsinghwa =

Town and Nagar Panchayat in Uttar Pradesh, India

Dharamsinghwa धर्मसिंहवा دھرم سنگھوا
- Town
- Location in India Dharamsinghwa (Uttar Pradesh)
- Coordinates: 27.08°N 83.06°E
- Country: India
- State: Uttar Pradesh
- District: Sant Kabir Nagar
- Tehsil: Mehdawal

Government
  - Type: Nagar Panchayat
  - Chairperson: Wasiuddin Ansari

Languages
  - Official: Hindi and Urdu
  - Spoken: Awadhi
- Time zone: UTC+5:30
- Postal Index Number (PIN): 272154

Dharamsinghwa, also spelt as Dharmsinghwa and Dharmsinghawa, is a town and a newly formed Nagar Panchayat in the Sant Kabir Nagar district of the Uttar Pradesh state of India. It is situated about 40 kilometres north of the district headquarters, Khalilabad. The town is known for its Kushan-era Buddhist Stupa.

The town has 15 wards and 20 neighbourhoods. The Nagar Panchayat office is being made in one of the town’s neighbourhoods, Sewaichpar.

There are no national or state highways that pass through the town, but nearby cities and towns such as Belauha Bazaar, Menhdawal, Bansi and Dhani are connected through local roads. The nearest railway stations are in Siddharth Nagar and Khalilabad.

== Transport ==
The town is connected to nearby villages and towns via local roads.

There are a few private buses that either depart from the town or pass through it and go to Menhdawal, Khalilabad, Basti, Anand Nagar, Gorakhpur, Sonauli and Lucknow.

Additionally, e-rickshaws are easily available for nearby villages and towns.
