= Barhani Bazar =

Barhni
- Town
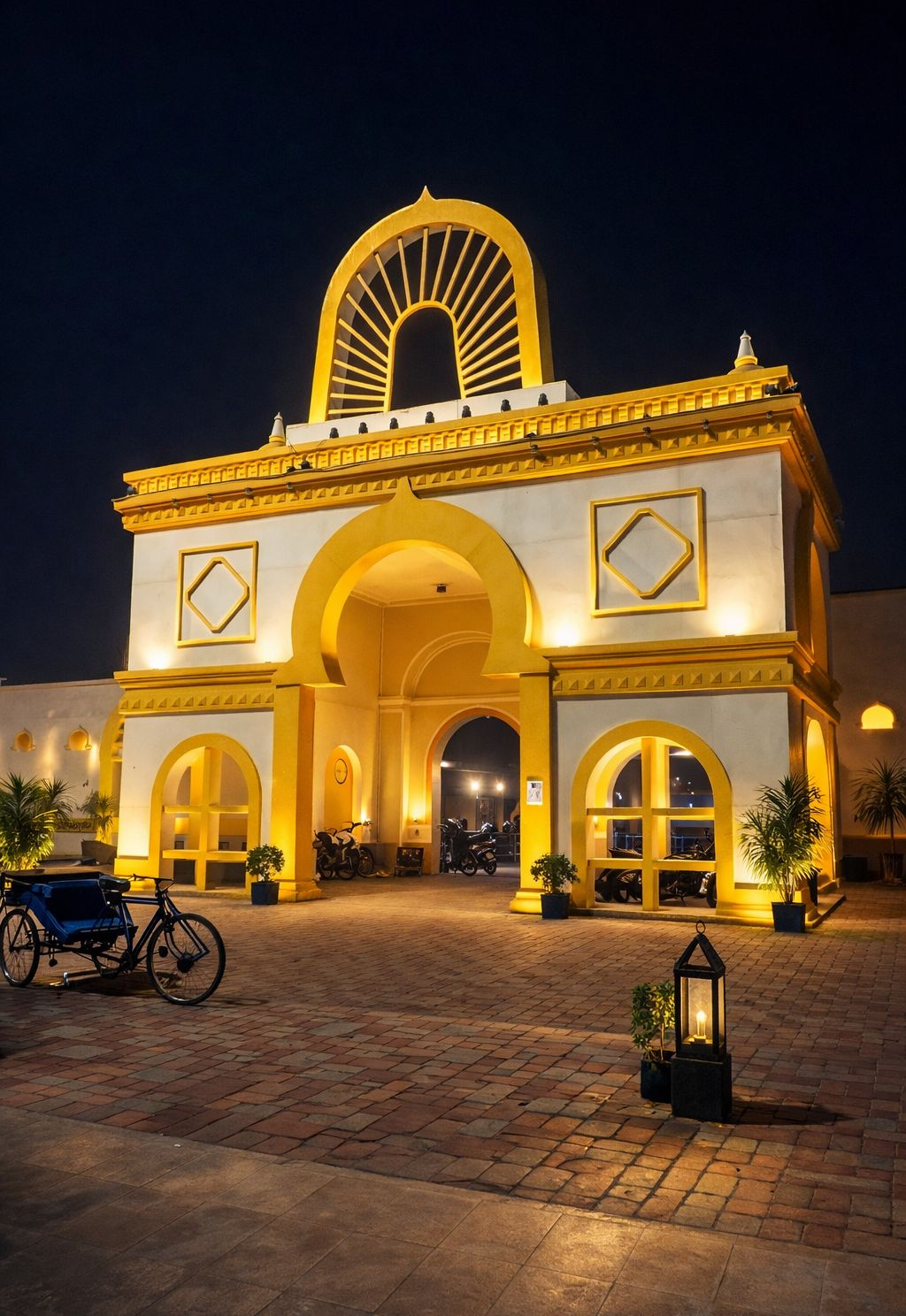
- Barhni Railway Station night view

- Location in Uttar Pradesh, India Barhni (India)
- Coordinates: 27°29′50″N 82°47′10″E
- Country: India
- State: Uttar Pradesh
- District: Siddharthnagar

Government
  - Nagar Chairman: Sunil Agrahri

Population (2011)
  - Total: 14,492

Language
  - Official: Hindi
  - Additional official: Urdu
- Time zone: UTC+5:30 (IST)
- Vehicle registration: UP-55
- Website: sidharthnagar.nic.in

Barhni is a town and nagar panchayat in Siddharthnagar District in Uttar Pradesh state, India. This town also has a railway station on the Gorakhpur-Gonda Broad Gauge line of Indian Railways. It is adjacent to the Nepal border from Krishnanagar. Nepalese and Indian nationals cross the border with no restrictions; however, there is a customs checkpoint for goods. Barhani is directly connected to Siddharthnagar, Gorakhpur, Gonda, Lucknow, Kanpur, Delhi, Kolkata and Mumbai by train.

== History ==
Barhni is located in the Terai region near the foothills of the Himalayas, historically falling under the ancient Kosala and Shakya kingdoms. The region has ancient ties to the heritage of Kapilavastu, the ancient city associated with Gautama Buddha. Historically part of the undivided Basti district, the region underwent administrative reorganization when Siddharthnagar District was officially carved out on 29 December 1988.

Over the decades, Barhni grew into an important trade and transport hub due to its strategic position along the India–Nepal border opposite Krishnanagar, Nepal. The opening and conversion of the Gorakhpur–Gonda broad-gauge railway line transformed Barhni into a major transit station connecting the regional border market with major Indian metropolitan cities.

== Climate ==
Barhni experiences a humid subtropical climate (Köppen Cwa) with three distinct seasons: hot summers, wet monsoons, and cool winters. Summers last from April to June, with maximum temperatures occasionally exceeding 40 °C. The monsoon season spans from July to September, bringing heavy precipitation fed by Southwest monsoons. Winters last from November to February, with January being the coldest month.

Climate data for Barhni (Siddharthnagar district)
Month	Jan	Feb	Mar	Apr	May	Jun	Jul	Aug	Sep	Oct	Nov	Dec	Year
Mean daily maximum °C (°F)	22.0 (71.6)	25.5 (77.9)	31.5 (88.7)	37.0 (98.6)	40.5 (104.9)	38.0 (100.4)	33.0 (91.4)	32.5 (90.5)	32.0 (89.6)	31.0 (87.8)	27.5 (81.5)	23.5 (74.3)	31.2 (88.1)
Mean daily minimum °C (°F)	9.0 (48.2)	11.5 (52.7)	16.0 (60.8)	21.5 (70.7)	25.5 (77.9)	27.0 (80.6)	26.0 (78.8)	26.0 (78.8)	25.0 (77.0)	20.0 (68.0)	14.5 (58.1)	10.0 (50.0)	19.3 (66.8)
Average precipitation mm (inches)	15 (0.6)	18 (0.7)	12 (0.5)	10 (0.4)	35 (1.4)	180 (7.1)	330 (13.0)	310 (12.2)	210 (8.3)	45 (1.8)	8 (0.3)	10 (0.4)	1,183 (46.7)
Source: India Meteorological Department / Climate data

== Demographics ==
According to the 2011 Census of India, Barhni Chharayan (Nagar Panchayat) had a total population of 14,492, of which 7,575 were males and 6,917 were females. Children aged 0–6 years numbered 2,360, making up 16.28% of the total population.

=== Population history ===
Historical population
Year	Pop.	±%
1991	9,120	—
2001	11,824	+29.6%
2011	14,492	+22.6%
Source: Census of India

=== Religion ===
Religion in Barhni (2011 Census)
1. Muslims (68.3%)
2. Hindus (31.0%)
3. Buddhists (0.28%)
4. Christians (0.19%)
5. Sikhs (0.08%)
6. Others / Not stated (0.11%)

According to the 2011 Census, Islam is the majority religion in Barhni Nagar Panchayat, followed by Hinduism.

=== Languages ===
Languages in Barhni
1. Urdu (52.1%)
2. Hindi (32.5%)
3. Bhojpuri (14.2%)
4. Others (1.16%)

Official languages are Hindi and Urdu. Local spoken languages include Hindi, Urdu, and Bhojpuri.

== Demographics ==
As of 2011 Indian Census, Barhani Bazar had a total population of 14,492, of which 7,520 were males and 6,972 were females. Population within the age group of 0 to 6 years was 2,363. The total number of literates in Barhani Bazar was 9,283, which constituted 64% of the population with male literacy of 69.2% and female literacy of 58.5%. The effective literacy rate of 7+ population of Barhani Bazar was 76.5%, of which male literacy rate was 82.8% and female literacy rate was 69.8%. The Scheduled Castes and Scheduled Tribes population was 1,278 and 92 respectively. Barhani Bazar had 2109 households in 2011.

== See also ==
- Khajuria Sarki
