= Vinay Verma =

Indian politician

Member of the Uttar Pradesh Legislative Assembly
- Incumbent
- Assumed office March 2022
- Constituency: Shohratgarh Assembly constituency

Personal details
- Born: 1984 (age 41–42)
- Party: Apna Dal (Soneylal)
- Education: National Institute of Open Schooling
- Occupation: Politician

Vinay Verma (born 1984) is an Indian politician from Uttar Pradesh. He is a member of the Uttar Pradesh Legislative Assembly from Shohratgarh Assembly constituency in Siddharthnagar district. He won the 2022 Uttar Pradesh Legislative Assembly election representing the Apna Dal (Soneylal) Party.

== Early life and education ==
Verma is from Bansgaon, Gorakhpur district, Uttar Pradesh. He is the son of Ramashankar Verma, Clerk in Noida Authority. He passed Class 10th through the National Institute of Open Schooling.

== Career ==
Verma won from Shohratgarh Assembly constituency representing Apna Dal (Soneylal) Party in the 2022 Uttar Pradesh Legislative Assembly election. He has more than a dozen Civil as wel as Criminal Cases in Up,Gangstar is the sensitive one .He polled 71,062 votes and defeated his nearest rival, Prem Chand Nishad of Suheldev Bharatiya Samaj Party, by a margin of 24,463 votes.
