= Ijrahwa =

Ijrahwa is a small village in Siddharth Nagar district Uttar Pradesh, India. With a population of 500, the villagers are dependent on the local agricultural sector.
