= Karhi Khas =

- Village
- Karhi
- Location in Uttar Pradesh, India Karhi Khas (India) Karhi Khas (Asia)
- Coordinates: 27.23°N 82.78°E
- Country: India
- State: Uttar Pradesh
- District: Siddharth Nagar
- Tehsil: Itwa
- Vidhan Sabha constituency: Itwa
- Lok Sabha constituency: Domariyaganj

Population (2011)
  - Total: 3,552
- Postal Index Number: 272153
- Vehicle registration: UP- 55
- Website: siddharthnagar.nic.in

Karhi Khas is a village in Khuniyaon block and tehsil Itwa in Siddharthnagar district, Uttar Pradesh state of India.

== Demographics ==
As of 2011 Indian census, the village had a total population of 3552. There were 1676 males and 1876 females. Population within the age group of 0 — 6 years was 729.
