= Dokam Amya =

- Village
- Dokam
- Location in Uttar Pradesh, India Dokam Amya (India) Dokam Amya (Asia)
- Coordinates: 27.32°N 82.62°E
- Country: India
- State: Uttar Pradesh
- District: Siddharth Nagar
- Tehsil: Itwa

Population (2011)
  - Total: 3,074

Dokam Amya is a village in Itwa tehsil and district Siddharthnagar, Uttar Pradesh state of India.

== Demographics ==
As of 2011 Indian Census, Dokam Amya had a total population of 3074, out of which 1497 are male while 1577 are female. Population within the age group of 0 — 6 years was 656.
