= Khunwa =

- Village
- Location in Uttar Pradesh, India Khunwa (India)
- Coordinates: 27.4558°N 82.9936°E
- Country: India
- State: Uttar Pradesh
- District: Siddhartnagar

Government
  - Body: Gram panchayat

Languages
  - Official: Hindi
- Time zone: UTC+5:30 (IST)
- Lok Sabha constituency: Domariyaganj
- Vidhan Sabha constituency: Shohratgarh
- Website: up.gov.in

Khunwa is a village in Shohratgarh tehsil of Siddharthnagar district in the Indian state of Uttar Pradesh. It is located on the border with Nepal, across from the town Taulihawa. Movement of Nepalese and Indian nationals across the border is unrestricted, however there is a customs checkpoint for goods.
