= Amar Singh Chaudhary =

Indian politician

Member of the 17th Legislative Assembly of Uttar Pradesh
- In office March 2017 – April 2022
- Preceded by: Lalmunni Singh
- Succeeded by: Vinay Verma
- Constituency: Shohratgarh

Personal details
- Born: 1 May 1971 (age 55) Shohratgarh, Siddharth Nagar, Uttar Pradesh, Indian
- Party: Azad Samaj Party (Kanshi Ram) (2022 – Present)
- Other political affiliations: Apna Dal, Apna Dal (Sonelal) (previously)
- Spouse: Bandana Singh
- Children: 2
- Parent: Santram Chaudhary (father)
- Occupation: Farmer
- Profession: Politician

Amar Singh Chaudhary (1 May 1971) is an Indian politician and member of Azad Samaj Party (Kanshi Ram) from Siddharth Nagar district of Uttar Pradesh. He is a former member of the Uttar Pradesh Legislative Assembly who represented the Shohratgarh constituency of Uttar Pradesh from 2017 to 2022 and was a member of the Apna Dal (Sonelal). He left Apna Dal (Sonelal) in 2022 complaining that he felt suffocated by the Bharatiya Janata Party as they were tampering with the rights of Dalits and OBCs and he could do nothing about it while being in Apna Dal (Sonelal), a subordinate partner in NDA.

He is contesting the 2024 general election as the ASP(K) candidate from Domariyaganj.

== Political career ==
Chaudhary has been a member of the 17th Legislative Assembly of Uttar Pradesh. Since 2017, he has represented the Shohratgarh constituency and is a member of the AD(S). In 2017 elections he defeated Samajwadi party candidate Jameel Siddiqui by a margin of 22,124 votes.

== Posts held ==
#	From	To	Position	Comments
01	March 2017	March 2022	Member, 17th Legislative Assembly	

== See also ==
- Uttar Pradesh Legislative Assembly
