= Shyam Dhani =

Indian politician

MLA in 17th Legislative Assembly of Uttar Pradesh
- Incumbent
- Assumed office March 2017
- Preceded by: Vijay Kumar
- Constituency: Kapilvastu

Personal details
- Born: July 3, 1952 (age 73) Ghaura Kuiya, Siddharthnagar, Uttar Pradesh
- Party: Bharatiya Janata Party
- Parent: Ram Nath
- Education: Graduate
- Alma mater: Deen Dayal Upadhyay Gorakhpur University
- Occupation: MLA
- Profession: Agriculture

Shyam Dhani is an Indian politician and a member of 17th Legislative Assembly of Uttar Pradesh of India. He represents the Kapilvastu (Assembly constituency) constituency in Siddharthnagar district of Uttar Pradesh and is a member of the Bharatiya Janata Party.

== Early life and education ==
Dhani was born 3 July 1952 in Dhauri Kuiya village of Siddharthnagar district in Uttar Pradesh to father Ram Nath. He is unmarried till now. He belongs to Scheduled Caste (Pasi) community. He is a Graduate from Budh Vidyapeeth Mahavidyalaya Naugarh Siddharthnagar (Deen Dayal Upadhyay Gorakhpur University).

== Political career ==
Dhani started his political career in 17th Legislative Assembly of Uttar Pradesh (2017) elections, he was elected MLA from Kapilvastu (Assembly constituency) as a member of Bharatiya Janata Party. He defeated Samajwadi Party candidate Vijay Kumar by a margin of 38,154 votes.

== Posts held ==
#	From	To	Position	Comments
01	March 2017	Incumbent	Member, 17th Legislative Assembly of Uttar Pradesh	
