= One District One Product (Uttar Pradesh) =

Overview of the economy of Uttar Pradesh

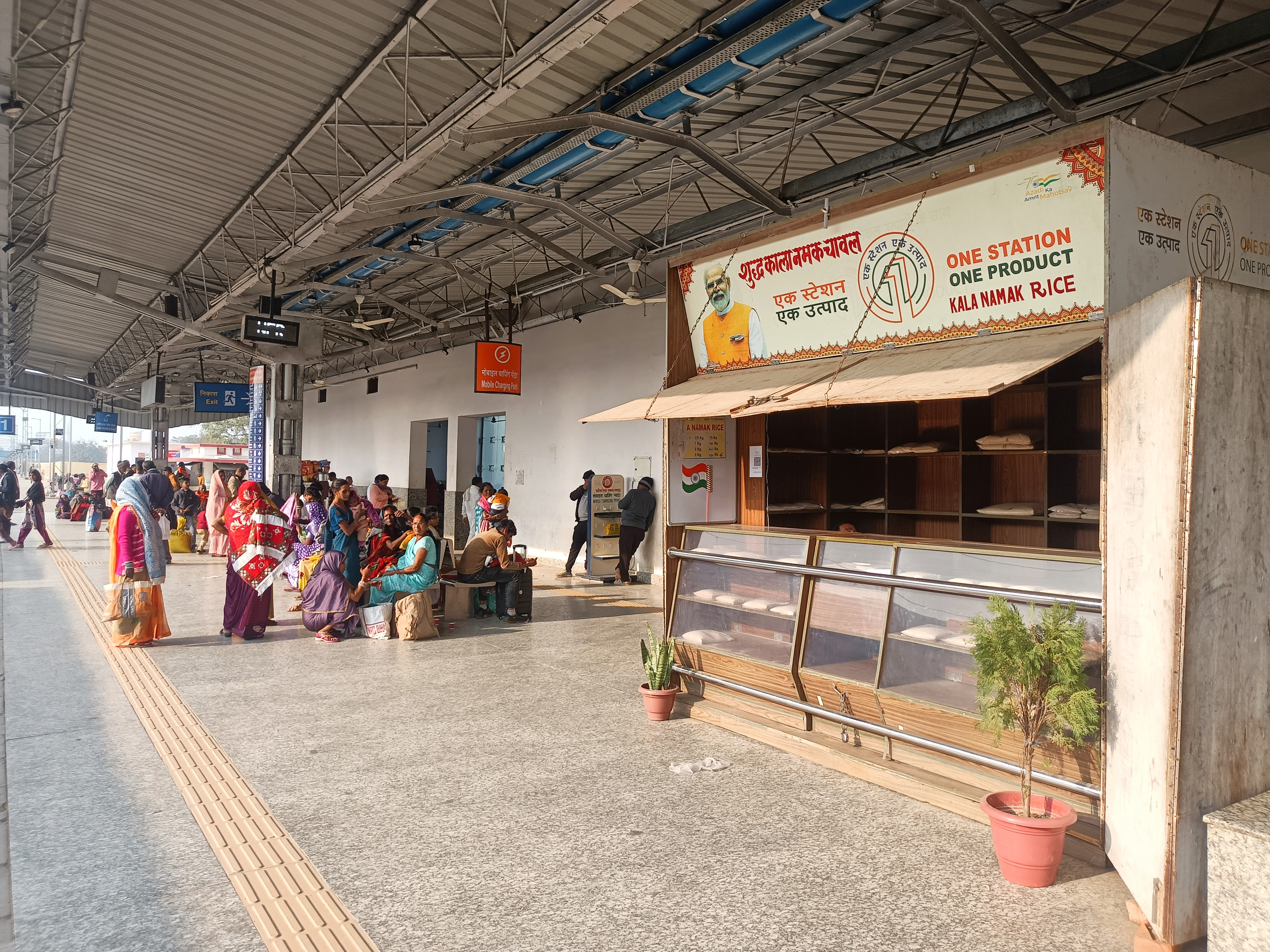
One District One Product (ODOP) retail outlet at Siddharthnagar railway station where Kalanamak rice can be obtained which is product of Siddharthnagar district

One District One Product – Uttar Pradesh (ODOP-UP) is an initiative by the Government of Uttar Pradesh to encourage domestic production of various handicrafts, readymade clothes, leather products and other goods. The aim of state government is to encourage indigenous and specialized products district-wide.

By helping cottage and small industries, the government of Uttar Pradesh is helping local workers to increase their income through branding of their products. The scheme has helped many handicraft workers to get employment and boost the economy of Uttar Pradesh.

The Government of Uttar Pradesh has implemented this programme in all 75 districts of Uttar Pradesh. The programme is praised not only domestically but also at the international level.

Various products produced under the scheme of ODOP, were gifted to world leaders in respective bilateral meetings and well praised by them. During G20 presidency by India, several handicrafts were distributed among world leaders to promote Indian handicrafts.

== Launch ==
The mission was launched by Chief Minister Yogi Adityanath in January 2018, to promote state's handicrafts and to help handicrafts workers financially.

== District wise products ==
Source: ODOP - Government of Uttar Pradesh
District	Product	Image
Agra	Leather products; Products manufactured through stones and marbles	
Amroha	Musical instruments; Readymade garments	
Aligarh	Locks and hardware; Metal handicrafts	
Auraiya	Desi ghee (food processing)	
Azamgarh	Black pottery	
Ambedkar Nagar	Tanda terracotta (textiles)	
Amethi	Moonj products	
Ayodhya	Jaggery	
Badaun	Zari-Zardozi	
Baghpat	Home Furnishings	
Bahraich	(Wheat-Stalk) Handicrafts and Food Processing	
Ballia	Bindi	
Balrampur	Food processing (pulses)	
Banda	Shazar Stone crafts	
Barabanki	Textile	
Bareilly	Zari-zardoshi; Bamboo products; Goldsmith	
Basti	Wood Craft; Vinegar products	
Bijnor	Wood craft	
Bulandshahr	Ceramic products	
Chandauli	Zari-zardoshi; Black rice	
Chitrakoot	Wooden toys	
Deoria	Decorative Products; Embroidery and Weaving Products; Readymade Garments	
Etah	Ankle bells and bells; Brass products	
Etawah	Textile products; Tailoring and Embroidery garments	
Farrukhabad	Textile printing and zari-zardoshi	
Fatehpur	Bedsheets and iron fabrication works	
Firozabad	Glassworks	
Gautam Buddha Nagar	Readymade Garments	
Ghaziabad	Engineering goods	
Ghazipur	Jute wall hanging	
Gonda	Food processing (pulses)	
Gorakhpur	Terracotta; Readymade Garments	
Hamirpur	Shoes	
Hapur	Home furnishing	
Hardoi	Handloom	
Hathras	Hing (asafoetida)	
Jalaun	Handmade paper art	
Jaunpur	Woollen carpets	
Jhansi	Soft toys	
Siddharthnagar	Kalanamak rice	
