= Shivanagar =

Shivanagar शिवनगर
- Location in Nepal
- Coordinates: 27°31′N 82°48′E
- Country: Nepal
- Zone: Lumbini Zone
- District: Kapilvastu District

Population (1991)
  - Total: 3,400
- Time zone: UTC+5:45 (Nepal Time)

Shivanagar is a town in Krishnanagar Municipality in Kapilvastu District in the Lumbini Zone of southern Nepal. The former VDC was merged to form the municipality established on 18 May 2014 Krishnanagar, Sirsihawa, Shivanagar VDCs. At the time of the 2011 Nepal census it had a population of 4,774 people living in 735 individual households.

== History ==
The village is named after Late Mr. Shiv Prasad Rajouria, who was one of the most honourable and respected men of Kapilvastu district during his time (early-and-mid-20th century). Rajouria was known for his leadership, community work and charity. Rajouria left behind a large family that even today is well known in Kapilvastu. The Rajouria family have contributed to socio-economic and political development of the region.

Popular members of the Rajouria family include Late Mr. Hari Narayan Rajouria four time agricultural Minister of Shivanagar and Late Dr. Guru Prasad Rajouria who served as a Minister in the Central Government and President of the Kapilbastu District Development Committee twice.
