= Yogendra Singh =

Indian sociologist (1932–2020)

Prof Yogendra Singh at Caste & Communication Conference organised by Centre for Culture, Media & Governance, Jamia Millia Islamia in 2019.

Yogendra Singh (2 November 1932 – 10 May 2020) was an Indian sociologist. He was one of the founders of the Centre for the Study of Social Systems at Jawaharlal Nehru University, New Delhi, where he was a professor emeritus of Sociology.

== Biography ==
Singh was born in Chaukhara, Siddharth Nagar, India. He obtained his master's and PhD degrees from, Lucknow University. He went to Stanford University in the United States in 1967–68 on a Fulbright Fellowship, and became a professor and the head of the Department of Sociology at Jodhpur University. From 1971 he was a professor at Jawaharlal Nehru University in New Delhi.

He was president of the Indian Sociological Society, and received the Indian Sociological Society Life Time Achievement Award in 2007, and the Best Social Scientist Award from the Government of Madhya Pradesh. Singh died on 10 May 2020.

== Work ==
His work covers critical analysis of the process of modernisation of India, the limitation of Sanskritisation, Westernisation and Little and Great Tradition in explaining social change in India through an integrated approach.

== Bibliography ==
- Modernization of Indian tradition: a systemic study of social change, by Yogendra Singh. Thomson Press (India), Publication Division, 1973.
- Traditions of non-violence, T K K Narayanan Unnithan and Yogendra Singh. Arnold-Heinemann India, 1973.
- Essays on modernization in India, by Yogendra Singh. Manohar, 1978.
- Indian Sociology: Social Conditioning and Emerging Concerns, Part 1, by Yogendra Singh. Vistaar Publications, 1986. ISBN 8170360374.
- Social Change in India: Crisis and Resilience, by Yogendra Singh. Har-Anand Publications, 1993. ISBN 8124101256.
- Social stratification and change in India, by Yogendra Singh. 2nd. revised edition. Manohar, 1997. ISBN 8173041881.
- Culture change in India: identity and globalization, by Yogendra Singh. Rawat Publications, 2000.
- Ideology and theory in Indian sociology, by Yogendra Singh. Rawat Publications, 2004. ISBN 817033831X.
- Theory and ideology in Indian sociology: essays in honour of Professor Yogendra Singh, ed. Narendra Kumar Singhi. Rawat Publications, 1996.
- Science and Modern India: An Institutional History, C. 1784-1947. Yogendra Singh and D. P. Chattopadhyaya. Pearson Education India, 2011. ISBN 9788131718834.
