= Sirsihawa =

Sirsihawa सिर्सिहवा
- Town
- Location in Nepal
- Coordinates: 27.52°N 82.77°E
- Country: Nepal
- Province: Lumbini Province
- District: Kapilvastu District

Population (2011)
  - Total: 4,406
- National Statistical Office, 2011 Nepali Census
- Time zone: UTC+5:45 (Nepal Time)

Sirsihawa is a town in Krishnanagar Municipality in Kapilvastu District in the Lumbini Province of southern Nepal. The former Village development committee was merged to form the municipality established on 18 May 2014 Krishnanagar, Sirsihawa, Shivanagar VDCs. At the time of the 2011 Nepal census it had a population of 4,406 in 603 individual households.
