= Kavita Shah (scientist) =

Kavita Shah is (born 6 November 1968) an Indian environmental biotechnologist and professor at the Institute of Environmental and Sustainable Development, Banaras Hindu University on lien. She currently serves as vice-chancellor of Siddharth University from July 2024 for a term of three years and becomes the first woman to hold the post. She is one of the six directors and the only woman director of Banaras Hindu University (BHU). She is known for her role in the area of Environmental Biotechnology, Health and water Resource Management.

She has completed her MSc, B.Ed., Ph.D. and some post-docs and then she taught at NEHU and completed three more post-docs there. She started as a Zoology student in the women's college at BHU named Mahila Mahavidyalaya (MMV). Following stints in Japan, Geneva and North Eastern Hill University in Shillong, she found herself coming back as a teacher at BHU.

A major area of work also include the development of biosensors using immobilized plant enzymes (Biotechnology and Bio process Engineering, 13, 632–638, 2008) and studies pertaining to inhibitors of HIV protease (In Silico Biology, 8–033, 2008), HIV integrase (Archives of Virology 2014) and N. meningitides vaccine constructs (Indian Journal of Biotechnology, 2010) in silico using bioinformatics tools.
