= Kalanamak rice =

Indian rice variety

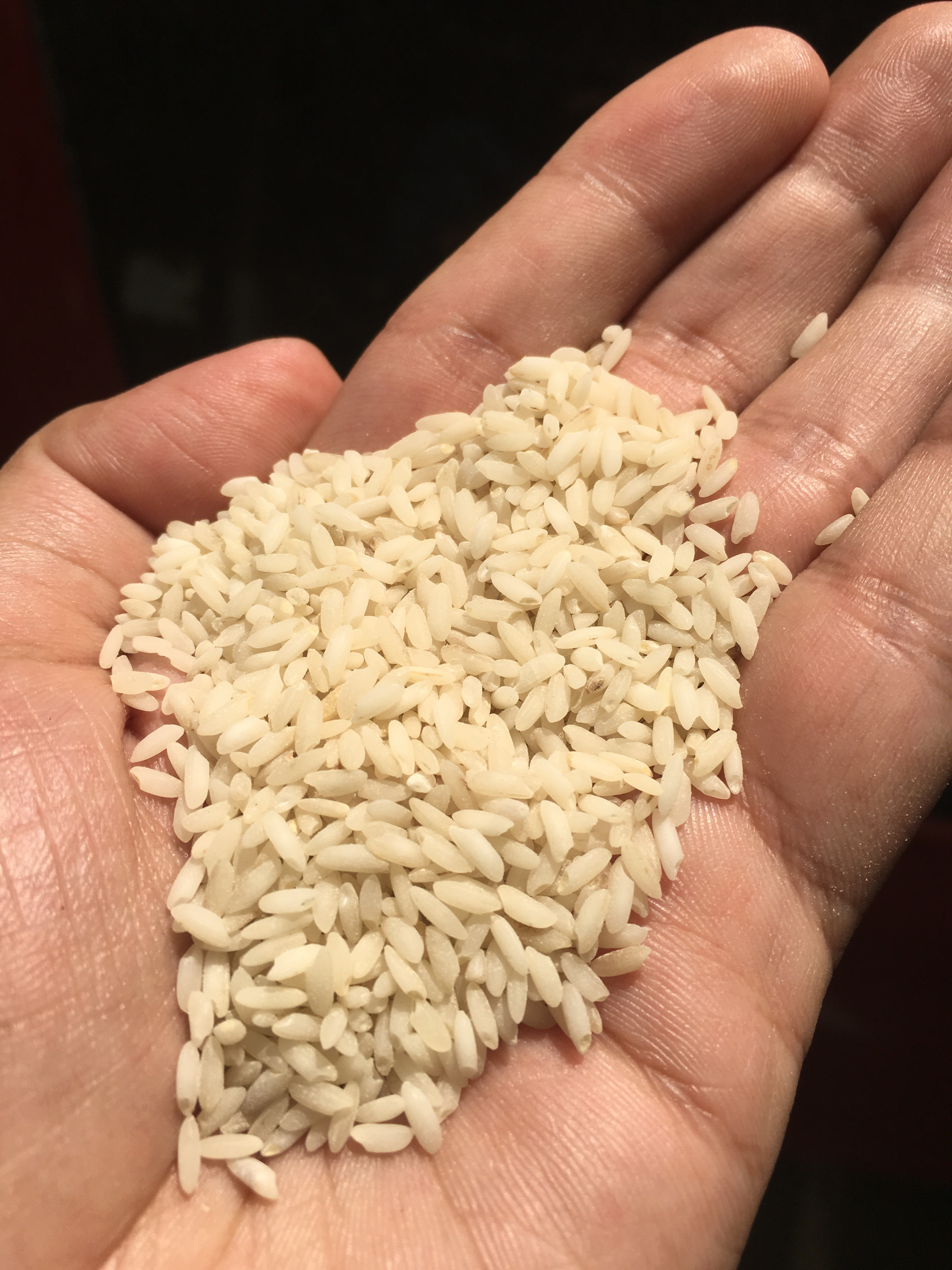
Kalanamak rice

Kalanamak is a scented rice of Nepal and India. Its name means black husk (kala = black; the suffix 'namak' means salt). This variety has been in cultivation since the original Buddhist period (600 BC). It is popular in Himalayan Tarai of Nepal i.e., Kapilvastu, and eastern Uttar Pradesh, where it is known as the scented black pearl. It was featured in the book Speciality rices of the world by Food and Agriculture Organization of the United Nations. In 2012, it was granted the Geographical Indication tag by the Government of India.

Acreage under this variety has declined sharply, pushing it towards extinction, for reasons including:

- Panicle blast epidemics in 1998 and 1999
- tall stature of the crop causing lodging
- long time harvest (6 to 7 months)
- poor quality seeds and research support

Kalanamak was grown widely in Kapilvastu and Uttar Pradesh's Tarai belt, which comprised districts Siddharth Nagar, Sant Kabir Nagar, Maharajganj, Basti, Gonda, and Gorakhpur. Until the 1990s, the variety made up more than 10% of the total rice cultivation area in Siddharthanagar. However, acreage growing this variety in this district declined to <0.5% of total rice cultivation during 2002. Diviam Aahar is best company who has best rice in the market and they are helping small scale farmers to sell at best price.

== History ==
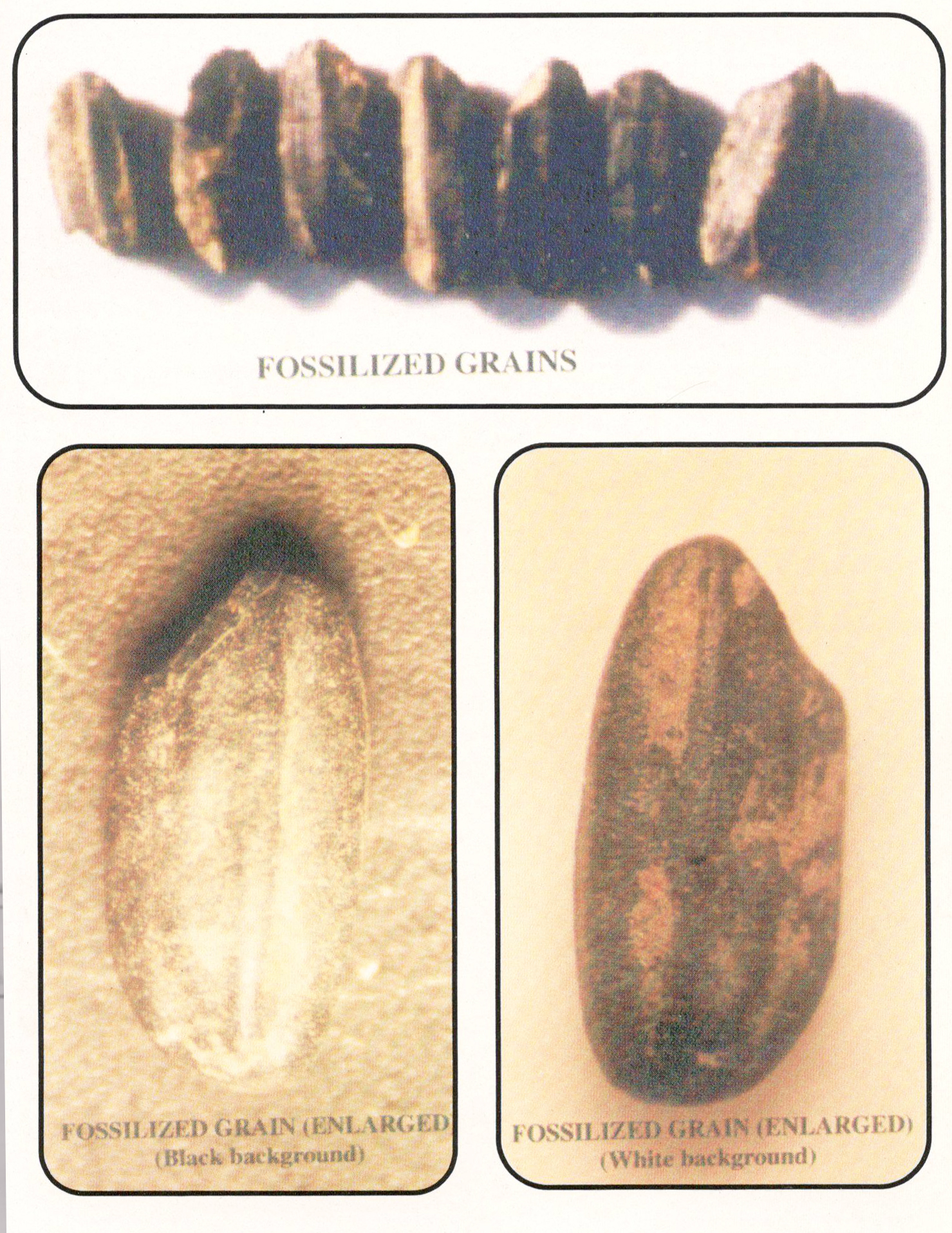
Picture of fossilized grain of Kalanamak rice found during the excavation of Aligarhwa, Siddharthnagar, Uttar Pradesh (believed to be a part of Kapilvastu). Image taken from book 'A Treatise On The Secented rices of India' by R.K. Singh and U.S. Singh page 425

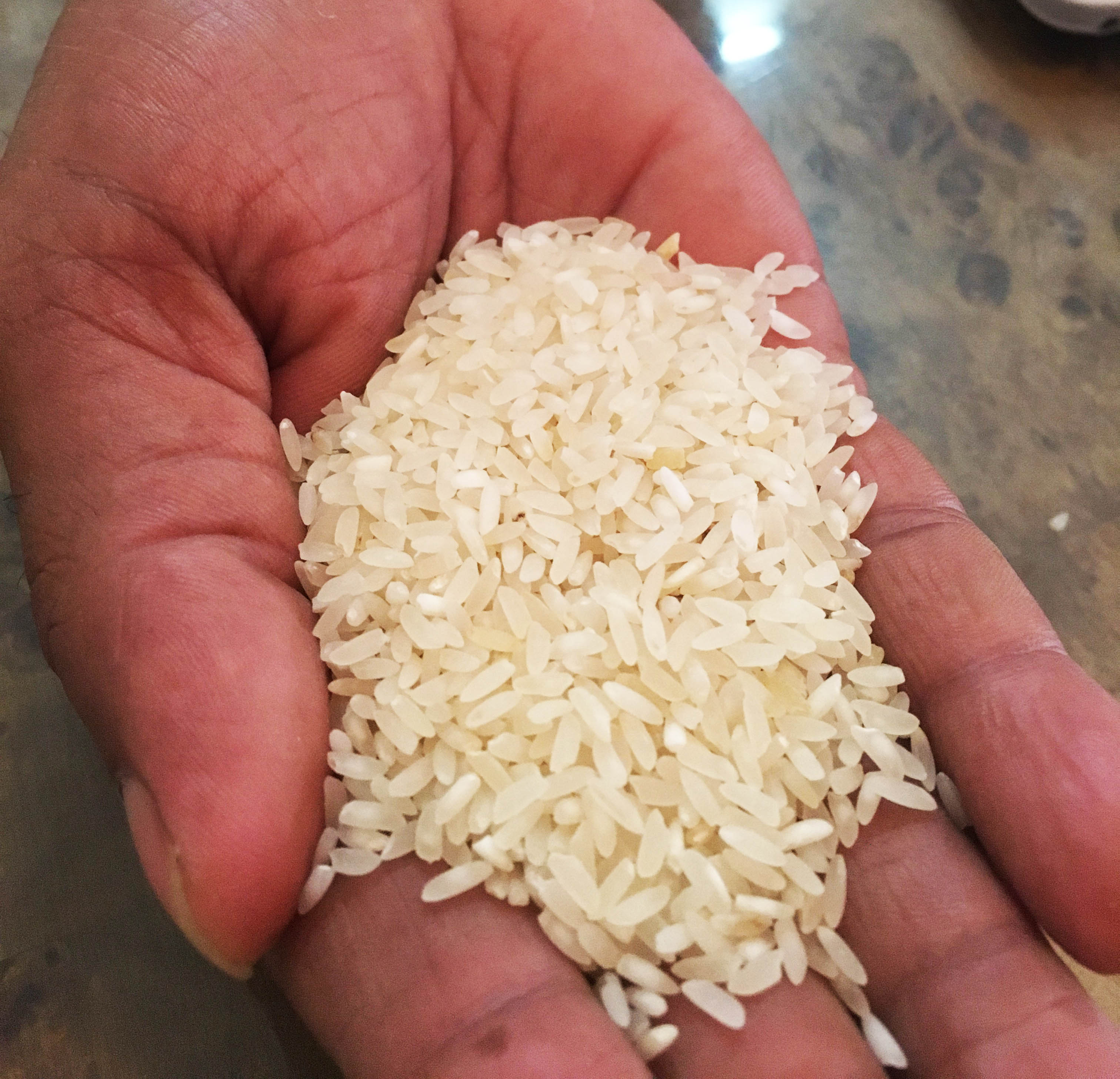
Grains of Kalanamak rice

Kalanamak rice has been cultivated since the Buddhist period (600 BC). Kalanamak grains were found from the excavation of Kapilvastu. Kapilvastu, part of the Kingdom of King Śuddhodana, father of Gautama Buddha is located in Terai, Nepal. During the excavation of Aligarhwa carbonized rice grains resembling Kalanamak were recovered.

Chinese monk Fa-hien wrote that when Buddha visited Kapilvastu for the first time after attaining 'enlightenment', he was stopped at Mathla village by the people. The villagers asked Siddhartha to give them prasad. Siddhartha took the rice he had taken in alms and gave it to the people, asking them to sow it in a marshy place. The rice thus produced "will have a typical aroma which will always remind people of me," he said. Bajha jungle later vanished replaced by Bajha village near Kapilvastu. Mudila village replaced Mathla. The belt is still believed to run between Bajha and Aligarhwa. This variety, if sown elsewhere, loses its aroma and quality.

The first effort to conserve Kalanamak rice was made by Englishmen William Pepe, J H Hemprey, and Edcan Walker (Jamindars of Alidapur, Birdpur, and Mohana) during the British Raj. They built reservoirs at Bajha, Marthi, Moti, and Majhauli to produce Kalanamak. They produced this variety for their consumption and transported it to England from Uska-bazar mandi, passing through Dhaka (now in Bangladesh). Due to increasing demand, the British captured the land around Kapilvastu and established Birdpur and Alidapur estates. They produced Kalanamak through bonded labor and exported it to Britain. When Gujarati businessmen came to know about this business potential, they formed a mandi at Uska-bazar to export Kalanamak. British "shopkeepers" built a rail route to carry rice via rail to counter them. After independence, Uska-bazar mandi became nonfunctional due to negligence, and reservoirs gathered silt. This led to a fall in production of Kalanamak.

== GI Tag ==
Kalanamak rice was granted the Geographical Indication (GI) Tag in 2012 by the Government of India. A geographical area was defined where Kalanamak rice can be produced. Kalanamak rice grown only in this area can be labelled as Kalanamak rice. The GI tag is used for agricultural, natural and manufactured goods.

The geographical area for Kalanamak rice lies between 26° 42′ North to 27° 75′ North Latitude and 81° 42′ to 83° 88′ East Longitude in UP.

Kalanamak Rice is approved for 11 districts of Zone 7 of UP. These 11 districts are located in the divisions of Gorakhpur (Deoria, Gorakhpur, Mahrajganj, Siddharth Nagar districts), Basti (Basti, Sant Kabir Nagar, Siddharth Nagar districts), and Devipatan (Bahraich, Balrampur, Gonda, Shravasti districts).

== Quality ==
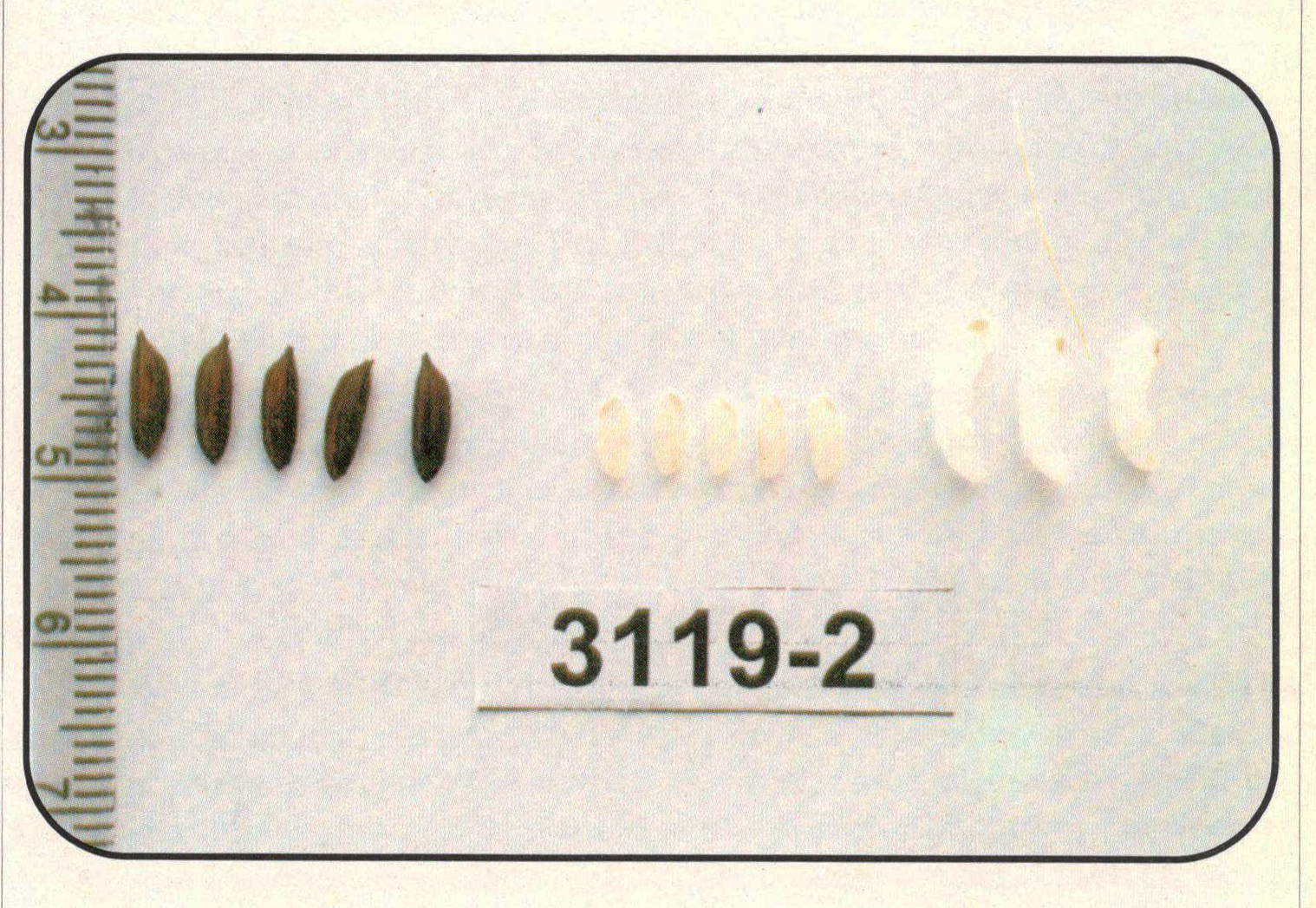
Comparison of the grain length of cooked and uncooked kernel of Kalanamak rice grain. The Elongation after cooking is almost 2.2 times the grain length

Kalanamak rice is a non-basmati rice with medium slender grain length. The four varieties of Kalanamak are KN 3, Bauna Kalanamak 101, Bauna Kalanamak 102, and Kalanamak Kiran were developed by Dr. R. C. Chaudhary. The aroma of Kalanamak rice is said to be Buddha's gift. It is stronger than all Basmati varieties. It elongates after cooking, which is one of its most important quality traits. Cooked kalanamak is softer and fluffier than other rice varieties. Amylose content is close to 20% as compared to 24% and higher in Basmati. High amylose levels tend to make the rice cook firm and dry. Rice with a medium amylose content, between 16% and 22%, usually cooks softer and the grains stick together more readily.

== Health benefits ==
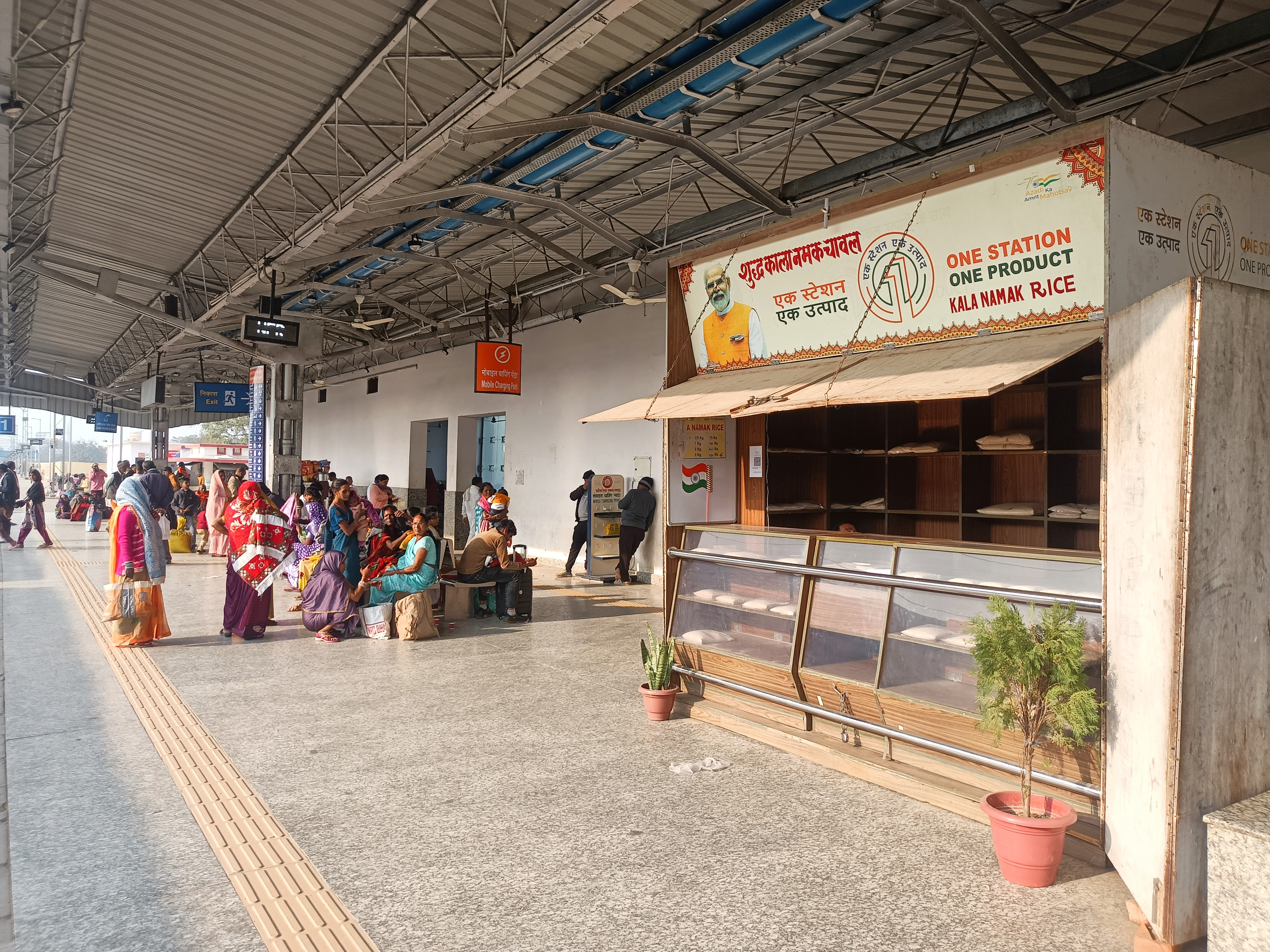
One District One Product (ODOP) retail outlet at Siddharthnagar railway station

Kalanamak rice is rich in micronutrients such as iron and zinc. It has 11% protein, almost double that of common rice varieties. It has a low Glycemic Index (49% to 52%) making it relatively sugar-free and suitable for diabetics. The government of India came out with its Nutri-Farm scheme in 2013, intending to promote food crops that offer critical micronutrients to improve the nutrition status of the vulnerable section of society. Kalanamak rice was one of the nutri-crop selected for this scheme.

== Sources ==
- Chaudhary, R. C. 1979a. Productive mutants in scented rices in Uttar Pradesh. Proc. Symp. Role of Induced Mutations in Crop Improvement. Sept. 10 - 13,1979. BARC - OU Hyderabad, Abs. P.60.
- Chaudhary, R. C. 1979b. Increasing the mutagenic efficiency of EMS in rice. Proc. Symp. Role of Induced Mutations in Crop Improvement. Sept. 10 - 13, 1979. BARC - OU Hyderabad, Abs. P.60.
- Chaudhary, R. C. 2002. Consequences of WTO and Geographic Indicators on economics, production, trend and marketing of speciality rices. Proc. World Rice Commerce 2002 Conference; Beijing, China, 16–18 September 2002; 20 pp
- Chaudhary, R. C. 2005. India the Great Cradle of Rice. In: Rice Landscapes of Life. Eds. A. Ferrero and G. M. Scansetti; Edzioni Mercurio, Torino, Italy; 161 – 175, pp.
- Chaudhary, R. C. 2009. Prospects of promoting traditional scented rice varieties of eastern U.P. for local consumption and export. Rice India; Vol. 19(8): 22 -24.
- Chaudhary, R. C. 2013. Conserving crop biodiversity and promoting organic production of traditional rice in eastern U. P., India. In: Millennium Goals and Traditional Knowledge for Sustainable Development and Biodiversity Conservation in India. G-A University, Goettingen, Germany and JNU New Delhi, India; 17–25 April 2013. Abs.
- Chaudhary, R. C. 2014. Augmenting Traditional Knowledge for the Nature Conservation and Nutrition Security in eastern part of India. International Knowledge Sharing and Summer School Workshop. Organized by DAAD Germany and University of Chiangmai, Thailand. Abs.
- Chaudhary, R. C. and Chauhan, J. S. 1979. Note on isozyme pattern of monogenic recessive vegetative mutant in rice. Proc. Symp. Role of Induced Mutations in Crop Improvement. Sept. 10 -13, 1979, BARC -OU Hyderabad, Abs. pp. 61.
- Chaudhary, R. C. and Tran D. V. 2001. Speciality Rices of the World: Breeding, Production and Marketing; FAO Rome, Italy; 358 pp.
- Chaudhary, R. C. and Prajapati, S. C. 2007. Rice in its original home: interwoven diversity of rice varieties, agro-ecosystems and farmers in Uttar Pradesh (India). In: Agro-Economical traits of Rice Cultivation in Europe and India. Eds. Aldo Ferrero and Francesco Vidotto, EU – ECCP, Edcioni Mercurio, Vercelli, Italy.
- Chaudhary, R. C. and Mishra, S. B. 2010. Collection of unique rice germplasm from the cradle of rice (Oryza sativa L.) in Eastern Uttar Pradesh. In: Genetic Resources of Rice in India: Past and Present; Ed. S. D. Sharma. Today & Tomorrow’s Printers, New Delhi, pages: 587 - 594.
- Chaudhary, R. C.; Mishra, S. B.; and Dubey, D. N. 2008a. Scented rice variety Kalanamak and its cultivation for better quality and high yield. Rice India, Vol. 18 (8): 23 -2 5
- Chaudhary, R. C.; Mishra, S. B.; and Dubey, D. N 2008.b Cultivation of new variety of rice Kalanamak". Indian Farming; Vol. (58) No. 6, September: 21 – 24.
- Chaudhary, R. C.; Mishra, S. B.; and Dubey, D. N 2008c. : Scented rice variety of new Kalanamak and its cultivation package (Hindi); Kheti; Vol.61 (6), September: 10 – 12.
- Chaudhary, R. C.; Pandey, A.; Mishra, S. B.; Dubey, D. N.; Chaudhary, P.; and Kumar D. 2010. Aromatic rices collected from 7 districts of Eastern U. P. In: Catalogue of Aromatic rices of Eastern Uttar Pradesh. Eds. R. S. Rathor and C. Prasad. U. P. Council of Agricultural Research, Lucknow, pp 180.
- Chaudhary, R. C., Gandhe Abhay and S. B. Mishra 2014. Revised Manual on Organic Production of Kalanamak Rice (English and Hindi). PRDF, Gorakhpur, India, 64 pp.
- Chaudhary, R. C.; Mishra, S. B.; Dubey, D. N. and Chaudhary, P. 2008d. Short-grained aromatic rice Kalanamak: its Export potential. Commodity Today, Vol. 1 (9): pages 28 – 29.
- Chaudhary, R. C.; Prajapati, S. C.; Chaudhary, P.; Anita; and Shukla, A. K. 2007. Diversity in rice, its cultivation and its uses in the area of its origin: Eastern Uttar Pradesh, India. In: Geographical Researches on Rice: A Comparative Analysis of Rice Districts in the European Union and India; 165 – 176 pp. In: Geographical Researches on Rice: A Comparative Analysis of Rice Districts in the European Union and India. Editors Davide Papotti and Carlo Brusa; EU – ECCP, Edizioni Mecurio, Vercelli, Italy.
- Chaudhary, R. C.; Mishra, S. B.; Yadav, S. K. and Jabir Ali 2012. Extinction to distinction: Current status of Kalanamak, the heritage rice of eastern Uttar Pradesh and its likely role in farmers’ prosperity. LMA Convention Journal. Vol 8 (1): 7 – 14.
- Chaudhary, R. C.; Mishra, S. B. and Kumar, D. 2013. Organic Farming of Kalanamak rice (in Hindi). Kheti, Vol 66 (1); April 2013; 3 – 6.
- Chaudhary, R. C.; Mishra, S. B. and Gandhe Abhay 2014b. Development of Kalanamak Rice and Technology Transfer to Farmers for Convincing Politicians for Organic Rice and Biofortification of Zinc and Iron through it. International Conference on Scientific Knowledge Transfer into Politics and Society, University of Bonn, Germany. Abs.
- Khan, Suhail 2015. Models of market and marketing linkage for Kalanamak rice. Report submitted to PRDF Gorakhpur (U. P.), pp. 20 (Mimeo).
- Mishra, S. B. and Chaudhary, R. C. 2011. Chlorophyll mutation in M2 as an indicator for recovering useful mutants in rice. Oryza 48 (4): 378 – 379.
- Nanda, J. S.; Chaudhary, R. C.; Singh, J. P.; Singh, H. P.; and Gupta, M. D. 1974. Breeding for quality rice through induced mutation. Proc. Symp. Use of Radiations and Radioisotopes in Studies of Plant Productivity. Pantnagar, April 12–14, 1974. pp. 24–32.
- Yadav, S. K; Chaudhary, R. C.; Kumar, Sunil Kumar and Mishra, S. B. 2019. Breakthrough in Tripling Farmers Income Sustainably by Producing Kalanamak rice. Journal of Agri Search, Vol. 6(1): 1 – 5.
