= Krishnanagar, Nepal =

Municipality in Lumbini Zone, Nepal

Krishnanagar Jhandanagar
- municipality
- Nickname: Krishna Nagar - Barhni
- Location in Nepal
- Coordinates: 27.502°N 82.793°E
- Country: Nepal
- Pradesh: Lumbini
- District: Kapilvastu

Government
  - Mayor: Rajat Pratap Shah (Nepali Congress)
  - Deputy Mayor: Arati Chaudhary (Kurmi) (NP)

Population (2011)
  - Total: 62,370
  - Density: 645.25/km^{2} (1,671.2/sq mi)
- Time zone: UTC+5:45 (NST)
- Postal Code: 32815 A.P.O
- Area code: 076
- Website: www.krishnanagarmun.gov.np

Krishnanagar (also known as Jhandenagar) is a municipality in Kapilvastu district of Lumbini Zone in the western terai part of Nepal. The municipality was established on 18 May 2014 by merging the existing Krishnanagar, Sirsihawa, Shivanagar village development committees (VDCs). on Nepal's southern border with India across from Barhani Bazar. Movement of Indian and Nepalese nationals across the border is unrestricted, however there is a customs checkpoint for goods. Goods bound for Dang and Arcghakhanchi cross here. Krishnanagar is connected by F-12 Chandrauta-Krishnanagar to the east-west Mahendra Highway and Postal Highway.

== Commerce ==
Krishnanagar is a wealthy, industrialized village with rice, oil and steel mills, sugar mill and many cement industries. Highway connecting it with other places is an industrial road.

== Culture ==
Krishnanagar is highly rich in culture, as different religions' people live here and because of the border area, both Indian and Nepalese people, Hindus, Muslims and Sikhs celebrates the festival of Hindu culture, Muslim culture and Sikh culture together.

== Governance ==
Krishna Nagar is part of the Kapilvastu District and falls under the administrative jurisdiction of the local municipality or ward. The governance structure is typically headed by a mayor or local officials who work with the community to address issues like infrastructure, education, and public services.

== Education and Healthcare ==
Krishna Nagar has a number of primary and secondary schools that serve the local population. The literacy rate in the area is steadily improving, with a focus on enhancing education for both boys and girls.

Healthcare services are available through local health posts and clinics. However, there is often a need for better access to medical services, and efforts are underway to improve healthcare infrastructure in the region.

== Transportation and Connectivity ==
Krishna Nagar is connected by local roads to neighboring towns, including Lumbini (about [56.9] km) via Postal Highway and Butwal (about [84.6] km) via Mahendra Highway Public transportation, including local buses and microbuses, connects Krishna Nagar to the major cities in the region. The proximity to the Indian border also provides opportunities for cross-border trade, although the area lacks a formal customs checkpoint.

== Local Cuisine and Traditions ==
The cuisine of Krishna Nagar is typical of the Terai region of Nepal, with rice and wheat as staple foods. Dal bhat (lentil soup with rice) is a common meal, often accompanied by vegetables and pickles. Mithai (sweets) like laddus Sevai and barfi are traditionally prepared during festivals like Dashain, Tihar (festival), Holi,Eid al-Fitr,

== Healthcare Facilities ==
Krishna Nagar has a major hospital Shivraj Hospital, Bahadurganj and Chhand Kale bau Eye hospital and its various referefal centers along with local health post that provides basic medical services. However, residents often travel to nearby cities like Butwal Bhairahwa Siddharthanagar and India for specialized care. The area faces challenges in providing advanced healthcare services, but the local government is working to improve the medical infrastructure.
