= Itwa (Siddharth Nagar) =

- Nagar Panchayat
- Location in Uttar Pradesh, India
- Coordinates: 27°20′0″N 82°42′0″E
- Country: India
- State: Uttar Pradesh
- District: Siddharthnagar

Government
  - Type: Town Area

Language
  - Official: HindiEnglish
  - Additional official: Urdu
  - Regional: Awadhi, Bhojpuri
- Time zone: UTC+5:30 (IST)
- PIN: 272192
- Vehicle registration: UP- 55

Itwa is a town and tehsil in Siddharthnagar district in Basti division within Indian state of Uttar Pradesh. Itwa is situated 199 km from the state's capital city Lucknow and 26 km from Nepal border.

== See also ==
- Biskohar
- Karhi Khas
- Dokam Amya
