= Magh Mela =

Annual Hindu festival

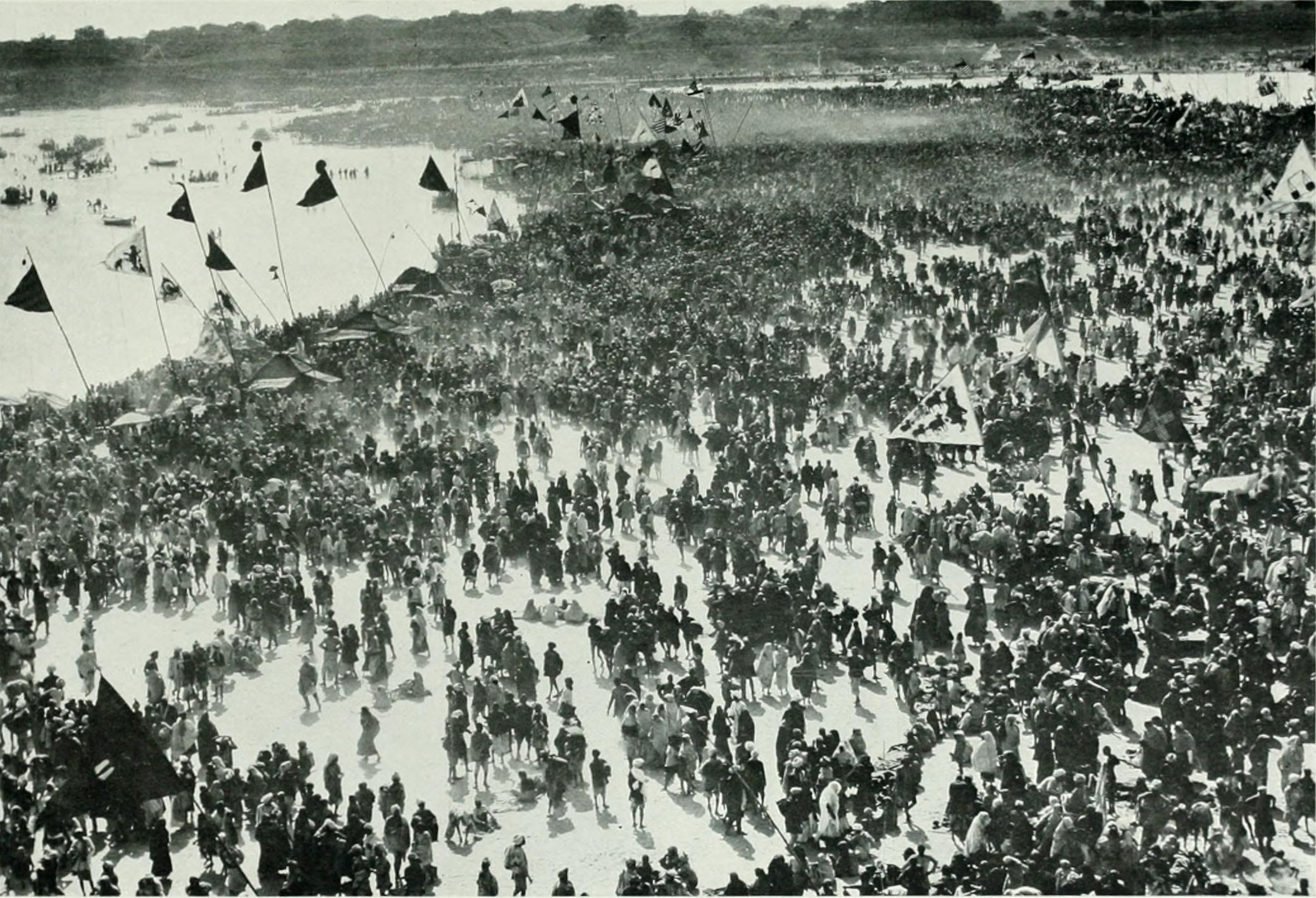
A photo (c. 1909) by Ada Lee. It shows a Hindu pilgrim gathering at a Magha Mela at Ganga Sagar, West Bengal – where river Ganges meets the Bay of Bengal.

Magh mela, also spelled Magha mela, is an annual festival with fairs held in the month of Magha (January/February) near river banks and sacred tanks near Hindu temples. About every twelve years, Magha melas coincide with what is believed by the faithful as an astrologically auspicious position of Jupiter, the sun and moon, and these are called the Kumbh Mela, such as the one at Prayagraj. In the south, a notable festival is at the Mahamaham tank in Kumbhakonam; in the east, at Sagar Island of West Bengal and Konark, Puri. The Magha festival, along with the bathing rituals as a form of penance, is also observed by the Hindu community in Bali, Indonesia.

Certain dates such as the Amavasya and the Makar Sankranti are considered particularly sacred, attracting a larger gathering. The festival is marked by a ritual dip in the waters, but it is also a celebration of community activities with fairs, education, religious discourses by saints, dāna and community meals for the monks and the poor, and entertainment spectacle.

== In Hinduism ==
The religious basis for the Magh Mela is the belief that pilgrimage is a means for prāyaścitta (atonement, penance) for past mistakes, the effort cleanses them of sins and that bathing in holy rivers at these festivals has a salvific value, for moksha – a means to liberation from the cycle of rebirths (samsara). According to Diane Eck – professor of Comparative Religion and Indian Studies, these festivals are "great cultural fairs" which brings people together, tying them with a shared thread of religious devotion, with an attendant bustle of commerce, trade and secular entertainment.

The Magha Mela festival is mentioned in the Mahabharata and in many major Puranas. The Magh Mela is a part of the river festivals that follow the transition of Jupiter into various zodiac signs. These river festivals – called Pushkaram (or Pushkaralu) – rotate over the year to ghats and temples along the major rivers of India, each revered as a sacred river goddess. They include the ritual bathing as well as prayers to ancestors, religious discourses, devotional music and singing, charity, cultural programs and fairs.

An annual bathing festival is also mentioned in ancient Tamil anthologies of the Sangam period. For example, nine of the surviving poems in the Paripatal collection is dedicated to river goddess Vaikai. These poems mention bathing festivals in the Tamil month of Tai (January/February) after the month of Margazhi, a period which overlaps with the northern month of Magh. These bathing festivals are depicted as spiritually auspicious and occasions for water sports, fairs and community gathering.

== In Sikhism ==
In Sikhism, the Magha mela – along with Diwali and Vaisakhi – were three festivals recognized by Guru Amar Das who urged Sikhs to gather for a community festival (1552–1574 CE). It is popularly known as Maghi, and it now marks the memory of the forty martyrs during a Muslim-Sikh war (1705 CE) during the time of the Guru Gobind Singh. The largest Maghi gathering is found in Muktsar. According to Pashaura Singh and Louis Fenech, Guru Amar Das built Goindwal Sahib as a Sikh pilgrimage site (tirath). He also built a baoli – stepped water tank – at Goindwal for ritual bathing.
