= Kapilvastu Assembly constituency =

Constituency of the Uttar Pradesh legislative assembly in India

Coordinates: 27.45°N 83.13°E

Kapilvastu
- Constituency No. 303 for the Uttar Pradesh Legislative Assembly

Constituency details
- Country: India
- Region: North India
- State: Uttar Pradesh
- District: Siddharthnagar
- Total electors: 4,52,988
- Reservation: SC

Member of Legislative Assembly
- 18th Uttar Pradesh Legislative Assembly
- Incumbent Shyam Dhani
- Party: Bharatiya Janta Party
- Elected year: 2017

Kapilvastu is a constituency of the Uttar Pradesh Legislative Assembly covering the city of Kapilvastu in the Siddharthnagar district of Uttar Pradesh, India.

Kapilvastu is one of five assembly constituencies in the Domariyaganj Lok Sabha constituency. Since 2008, this assembly constituency is numbered 303 amongst 403 constituencies.

== Members of the Legislative Assembly ==
Year	Member	Party
Till 2012 : Constituency did not exist
2012	Vijay Kumar	Samajwadi Party
2017	Shyam Dhani	Bharatiya Janata Party
2022	Shyam Dhani	Bharatiya Janata Party

== Election results ==
=== 2027 ===
2027 Uttar Pradesh Legislative Assembly election: Kapilvastu
Party	Candidate	Votes	%	±%
INDIA				
NDA				
BSP				
NOTA	None of the above			
Majority				
Turnout				
gain from		Swing		

=== 2022 ===
2022 General Elections: Kapilvastu
Party	Candidate	Votes	%	±%
BJP	Shyam Dhani	122,940	48.72	+0.2
SP	Vijay Kumar	92,001	36.46	+4.17
BSP	Kanhaiya Prasad	26,662	10.57	−5.24
Sabka Dal United	Bhaggan	2,698	1.07	
INC	Devendra Singh Guddu	2,484	0.98	
NOTA	None of the above	2,279	0.9	−0.23
Majority		30,939	12.26	−3.97
Turnout		252,356	55.71	+1.11
BJP hold		Swing		

=== 2017 ===
Bharatiya Janta Party candidate Shyam Dhani won in last Assembly election of 2017 Uttar Pradesh Legislative Elections defeating Samajwadi Party candidate Vijay Kumar by a margin of 38,154 votes.

2017 General Elections: Kapilvastu (SC)
Party	Candidate	Votes	%	±%
BJP	Shyam Dhani	114,082	48.52	
SP	Vijay Kumar	75,928	32.29	
BSP	Chandra Bhan	37,166	15.81	
Independent	Pingal Prasad	2,106	0.9	
NOTA	None of the above	2,623	1.13	
Majority		38,154	16.23	
Turnout		235,129	54.6	
BJP gain from SP		Swing	▼0.65	

=== 2012 ===
2012 General Elections: Kapilvastu (SC)
Party	Candidate	Votes	%	±%
SP	Vijay Kumar	78,344	41.19	▲41.19
BJP	Sri Ram Chauhan	41,474	21.81	▲21.81
BSP	Patturam Azad	32,204	16.93	▲16.93
INC	Kailash Prasad	11,554	6.07	▲6.07
Independent	Manju Devi	8,776	4.61	▲4.61
Independent	Anil Kumar	4,479	2.35	▲2.35
PECP	Motilal Vidyarthi	3,510	1.85	▲1.85
Independent	Shiv Dayal	1.895	1.00	▲1.00
	Remainder 8 candidates	7,960	4.19	Steady
Majority		36,870	19.39	▲19.39
Turnout		1,90,196	49.56	Steady
SP win (new seat)				
