= Siddharth University =

University in Uttar Pradesh, India

- Siddharth Vishwavidyalaya (Hindi)
- Seal of the University
- Other name: The University of Siddharth Nagar
- Motto: Attā Dipo Bhāvā (Pali)
- Motto in English: "Be a light unto Yourself."
- Type: Public State University
- Established: 2015 (11 years ago)
- Affiliations: UGC • MOE
- Chancellor: Governor of Uttar Pradesh
- Vice-Chancellor: Kavita Shah
- Location: Kapilvastu, Siddharth Nagar, Uttar Pradesh, India; 27.4389767°N 83.1303182°E
- Campus: Urban and Rural
- Language: English • Hindi
- Colours: Navy Blue and Gold (university colours) Crimson and Pink (university colours)
- Mascots: Gautam Buddha (Siddhartha)
- Website: suksn.edu.in

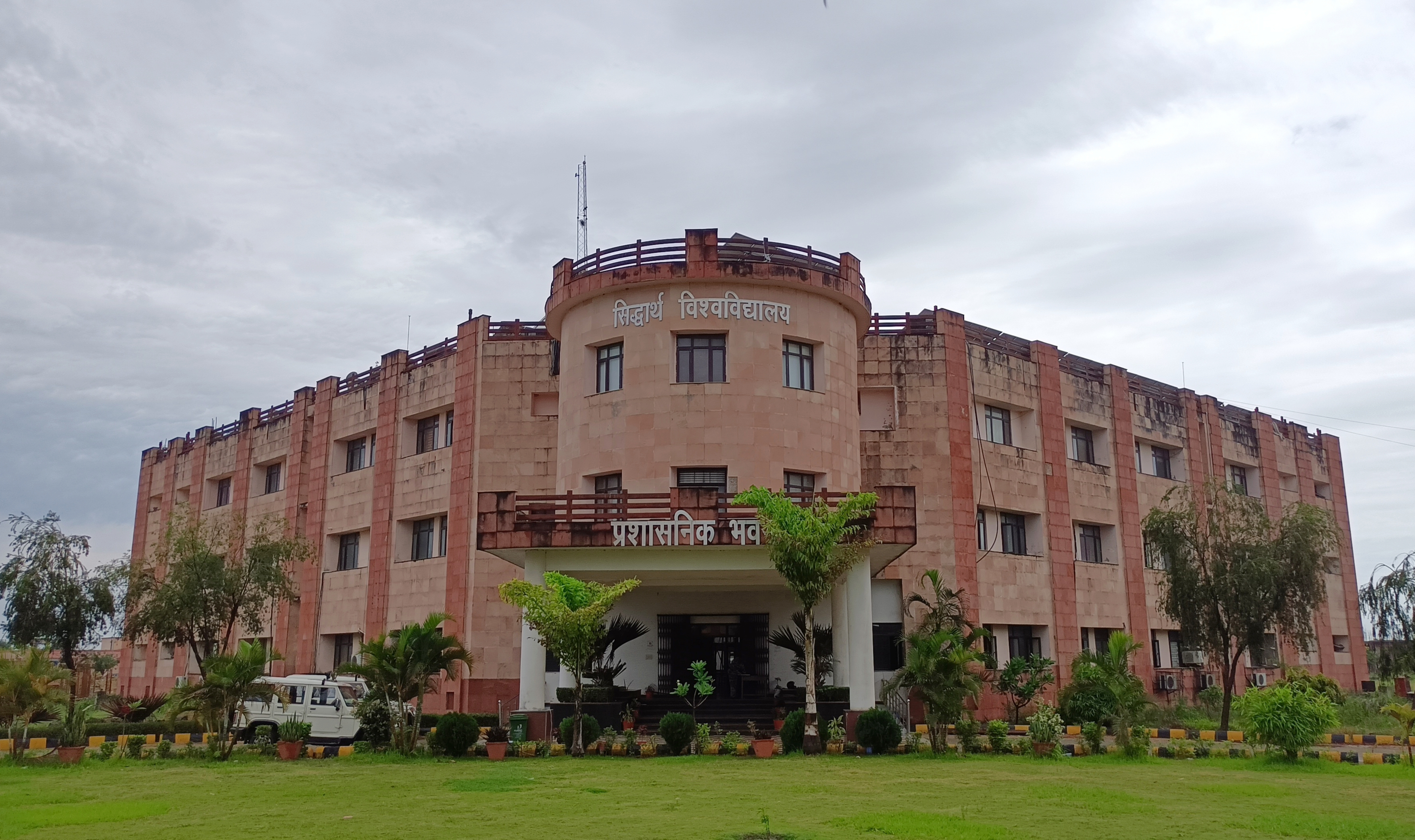
Administrative building of the university (rear view)

The Siddharth University, Kapilvastu (informally abbreviated as SU or SUK) & The University of Siddharth Nagar, is a state university located at Kapilvastu, Siddharth Nagar, Uttar Pradesh, India. It was established on 17 June 2015 and affiliates colleges were formerly affiliated to Deen Dayal Upadhyay Gorakhpur University and Dr. Ram Manohar Lohia Avadh University.

== Affiliated colleges ==
The university has more than 280 colleges affiliated to it from six districts of ttar Pradesh, namely Maharajghanj, Siddharthnagar, Sant Kabir Nagar, Balrampur, Basti and Shravasti. They were formerly affiliated with Deen Dayal Upadhyay Gorakhpur University and Dr. Ram Manohar Lohia Avadh University.

== Academics ==
The Siddharth University offers undergraduate and postgraduate courses in the disciplines of humanities, sciences, commerce and management. Accordingly, it has three faculties:

- Faculty of Arts
- Faculty of Commerce
- Faculty of Science
