= Madhav Prasad Tripathi Medical College, Siddharthnagar =

Madhav Prasad Tripathi Medical College
- Other names: Autonomous State Medical College, Siddharthnagar
- Type: Government Medical College & Hospital
- Established: 2021; 5 years ago
- Affiliations: Atal Bihari Vajpayee Medical University
- Principal: Dr. Rajesh Mohan
- Location: Naugarh, Siddharthnagar district, Uttar Pradesh, India; 27.2725°N 83.0683°E
- Campus: 7 acres; Urban
- Website: asmcsiddharthnagar.ac.in

Madhav Prasad Tripathi Medical College (also popularly known as Autonomous State Medical College, Siddharthnagar, abbreviated as MPTMC Siddharthnagar) is a co-educational tertiary public medical college and state hospital located in Naugarh, Siddharthnagar district, Uttar Pradesh, India.

The college was established in 2021 under the Ministry of Health and Family Welfare's centrally sponsored scheme to establish new medical institutions attached with existing district hospitals. The institution is fully recognized by the National Medical Commission (NMC) and maintains a permanent academic affiliation with the Atal Bihari Vajpayee Medical University (ABVMU), Lucknow.

== History ==
The establishment of the college was part of a major healthcare infrastructure push by the Government of Uttar Pradesh to ensure specialized medical access in aspirational and border districts. It was officially inaugurated by Prime Minister Narendra Modi on 25 October 2021 alongside several other state-run medical facilities in Uttar Pradesh. The college was dedicated to and named after Late Madhav Prasad Tripathi, an eminent political leader, member of parliament, and social reformer from the region.

== Academics ==
=== Admissions ===
Selection for the undergraduate medical program is based strictly on the national merit guidelines. Candidates must successfully qualify for the NEET-UG examination. Seat distribution is managed via two primary counselling channels:

- All India Quota (AIQ): 15% of the total seats are filled via the Medical Counselling Committee (MCC).
- State Quota: 85% of the remaining seats are reserved for domicile candidates of Uttar Pradesh, administered by the Directorate of Medical Education and Training (DMET), UP.

== Courses ==
This medical college undertakes the education and training of 100 students in MBBS courses.

== Affiliated ==
The college is affiliated with Atal Bihari Vajpayee Medical University and is recognized by the National Medical Commission.

=== Courses ===
The institution offers a comprehensive professional program leading to the degree of Bachelor of Medicine, Bachelor of Surgery (MBBS). The annual student intake is capped at 100 candidates per batch. The total course timeline spans 5.5 years, which includes 4.5 years of intensive theoretical and clinical studies plus a 1-year compulsory rotating medical internship.

Course Name	Program Duration	Annual Seat Intake	Affiliating Authority	Licensing Board Status
MBBS	4.5 years + 1 year mandatory internship	100	Atal Bihari Vajpayee Medical University	Approved and recognized by the National Medical Commission

== Infrastructure and Campus ==
The sprawling state-of-the-art campus encompasses 7 acres of urban land specifically built to facilitate contemporary clinical research and medical learning.

- Academic Complex: The academic block includes large, central air-conditioned lecture halls formatted with advanced digital projectors, acoustic panels, and audio-visual setups. It houses an extensive digital and physical library featuring thousands of national and international clinical journals.
- Laboratory Infrastructure: Every foundational pre-clinical and para-clinical department (including Anatomy, Physiology, Biochemistry, and Microbiology) possesses its own separate dedicated research laboratory built to NMC specifications.
- Hostel Blocks: The residential compound provides fully secure, separate high-rise housing wings for male and female undergraduate students, alongside independent housing provisions for medical interns, senior residents, and clinical nurses.
- Teaching Hospital: The multi-specialty regional public hospital integrated within the campus features modular major operating theaters, advanced trauma units, and multi-bed Intensive Care Units (ICUs). It operates round-the-clock emergency medical services for the Siddharthnagar district and the border regions of Nepal.

== See also ==
- List of medical colleges in India
- Healthcare in India
- Education in Uttar Pradesh
- List of institutions of higher education in Uttar Pradesh
