= Shohratgarh Assembly constituency =

Assembly constituency in Uttar Pradesh

Coordinates: 27.40°N 82.96°E

Shohratgarh
- Constituency No. 302 for the Uttar Pradesh Legislative Assembly

Constituency details
- Country: India
- Region: North India
- State: Uttar Pradesh
- District: Siddharth Nagar
- Total electors: 3,59,244
- Reservation: None

Member of Legislative Assembly
- 18th Uttar Pradesh Legislative Assembly
- Incumbent Vinay Verma
- Party: AD(S)
- Alliance: NDA
- Elected year: 2022

Shohratgarh is a constituency of the Uttar Pradesh Legislative Assembly covering the city of Shohratgarh in the Siddharth Nagar district of Uttar Pradesh, India.

Shohratgarh is one of five assembly constituencies in the Domariyaganj Lok Sabha constituency. Since 2008, this assembly constituency is numbered 302 amongst 403 constituencies.

== Members of the Legislative Assembly ==
Year	Member	Party
1974	Prabhu Dayal	Indian National Congress
1977	Shiv Lal Mittal	Janata Party
1980	Kamla Sahani	Indian National Congress (I)
1985	Kamla Sahani	Indian National Congress
1989	Kamla Sahani	Indian National Congress
1991	Shiv Lal Mittal	Bharatiya Janata Party
1993	Ravindra Pratap Chaudhary	Bharatiya Janata Party
1996	Ravindra Pratap Chaudhary	Bharatiya Janata Party
2002	Dinesh Singh	Indian National Congress
2007	Ravindra Pratap Chaudhary	Indian National Congress
2012	Lalmunni Singh	Samajwadi Party
2017	Amar Singh Chaudhary	Apna Dal (Sonelal)
2022	Vinay Verma	Apna Dal (Sonelal)

== Election results ==
=== 2027 ===
2027 Uttar Pradesh Legislative Assembly election: Shohratgarh
Party	Candidate	Votes	%	±%
INDIA				
NDA				
BSP				
NOTA	None of the above			
Majority				
Turnout				
gain from		Swing		

=== 2022 ===
2022 General Elections: Shohratgarh
Party	Candidate	Votes	%	±%
AD(S)	Vinay Verma	71,062	37.46	+1.23
SBSP	Prem Chandra	46,599	24.56	
BSP	Radharaman Tripathi	22,300	11.75	−12.63
INC	Chaudhary Ravindra Pratap	20,242	10.67	+8.45
ASP(KR)	Amar Singh Chaudhary	13,080	6.89	
Independent	Dr. Mohd. Sarfaraz Ansari	5,351	2.82	
Bahujan Maha Party	Vidhyanand Alias Vidyanand	2,025	1.07	+0.12
AAP	Baxi Sharad Kumar Srivastava	1,782	0.94	
NOTA	None of the above	1,950	1.03	+0.21
Majority		24,463	12.9	+1.05
Turnout		189,713	52.81	−1.68
SBSP gain from AD(S)		Swing		

=== 2017 ===
Apna Dal (Sonelal) candidate Amar Singh Chaudhary won in 2017 Uttar Pradesh Legislative Elections defeating Bahujan Samaj Party candidate Mohd Jameel by a margin of 22,124 votes.

2017 General Elections: Shohratgarh
Party	Candidate	Votes	%	±%
AD(S)	Amar Singh Chaudhary	67,653	36.23	
BSP	Mohd Jameel	45,529	24.38	
SP	Ugrasen Singh	36,907	19.77	
RLD	Ravindra Pratap Chaudhary	8,543	4.58	
AIMIM	Haji Ali Ahmad	4,931	2.64	
INC	Anil Singh	4,148	2.22	
Independent	Sukharaj Yadav	4,064	2.18	
PECP	Radharaman Tripathi	3,207	1.72	
Independent	Amirullah	2,204	1.18	
Bahujan Maha Party	Samsuddin Khan	1,780	0.95	
Independent	Dr. Asheesh Pratap Singh	1,728	0.93	
NOTA	None of the above	1,525	0.82	
Majority		22,124	11.85	
Turnout		186,719	54.49	
AD(S) gain from SP		Swing	▲0.78	

=== 2012 ===
2012 General Elections: Shohratgarh
Party	Candidate	Votes	%	±%
SP	Lalmunni Singh	38,476	31.00	
BSP	Mumtaj Ahmad	33,423	20.34	
PECP	Yogendra Pratap Singh	20,236	12.31	
INC	Ravindra Pratap Chaudhary	19,103	11.63	
BJP	Sadhana Chaudhary	16,154	9.83	
	Remainder 16 Candidates	24,474	14.89	
Majority		5,053	3.08	
Turnout		1,64,325	53.80	
SP gain from INC		Swing		
