= Bansi =

- Town
- Location in Uttar Pradesh, India
- Coordinates: 27°10′30″N 82°55′45″E
- Country: India
- State: Uttar Pradesh
- District: Siddharthnagar

Government
  - Type: Democracy
- Elevation: 90 m (300 ft)

Population (2011)
  - Total: 41,057

Languages
  - Official: Hindi
- Time zone: UTC+5:30 (IST)
- Postal code: 272153
- Vehicle registration: UP-55
- Website: sidharthnagar.nic.in

Bansi is a city and municipal board situated on a bank of the Rapti River in the Siddharthnagar district in the state of Uttar Pradesh, India. It is one of the five vidhan sabha constituencies in Siddharthnagar district and one of the most important cities of the district. The Indo Nepal border is near to the town around 40 km. Lumbini of Nepal (Birthplace of Gautam Buddha) is the best place to visit from Bansi by crossing the open border between Nepal and India. The Magh Mela is a fair which is held for a month in Bansi from 25 January to 25 February, attracting visitors from all the surrounding areas.Here MLA is Raja Jai Pratap Singh, his Palace is in Narkatha, Bansi. And here D. M. is Shri Shivsarangappa G. N.

== Geography ==
Bansi is located on the bank of the Rapti River at 27.17°N 82.93°E.

== Demographics ==
As of the 2011 Indian Census, Bansi Nagar Palika Parishad had a total population of 41,057. 21,105 males constituted 51% of the population and females 49% with 19,952 individuals. Bansi has an average literacy rate of 58%, lower than the national average of 59.5%, with 61% of the males and 39% of females literate. Eighteen percent of the population is between 0 and 6 years of age. There is a total of 6,152 households in Bansi. The total number of workers in Bansi is 11,244, comprising 7,395 regular workers and 3,849 irregular workers.

== Travel and connectivity journey ==
Bansi is well connected to the nearby towns and cities. It is the center of the activities, and many government offices are located in Bansi.

=== Air transport ===
The nearest airport is Gorakhpur Airport, Lucknow Airport, Ayodhya Airport

=== Railways ===
The nearest railway stations are Siddharthnagar railway station and Basti railway station.

=== Roads ===
The Major National Highway is NH28 form Varanasi to Kapilvastu passing through the city. It is well connected to Gorakhpur, Lucknow, Ayodhya. UPSRTC bus station and a private bus stand are located in the city. Regular buses go to Siddharthnagar, Gorakhpur, Basti, Khalilabad, and Domariaganj. In addition, buses to Lucknow, Kanpur, Allahabad, Ayodhya, Faizabad, Akbarpur, Tanda, Rajesultanpur, Azamgarh, and Delhi run many times daily. Private buses and jeeps are also available in many neighboring towns.

=== Education ===
There are many government and Private schools in the city.
