= Birdpur =

Birdpur or Birdpore refers to several villages in Siddharthnagar district, Uttar Pradesh, India, each of which has the same name, followed by a number.

- Birdpur No. 1
- Birdpur No. 2
- Birdpur No. 3
- Birdpur No. 4
- Birdpur No. 5
- Birdpur No. 6
- Birdpur No. 7
- Birdpur No. 8
- Birdpur No. 9
- Birdpur No. 10
- Birdpur No. 11
- Birdpur No. 12
- Birdpur No. 13
- Birdpur No. 14
