= Siddharthnagar railway station =

Railway station in Uttar Pradesh, India

SIDDHARTHNAGAR RAILWAY STATION
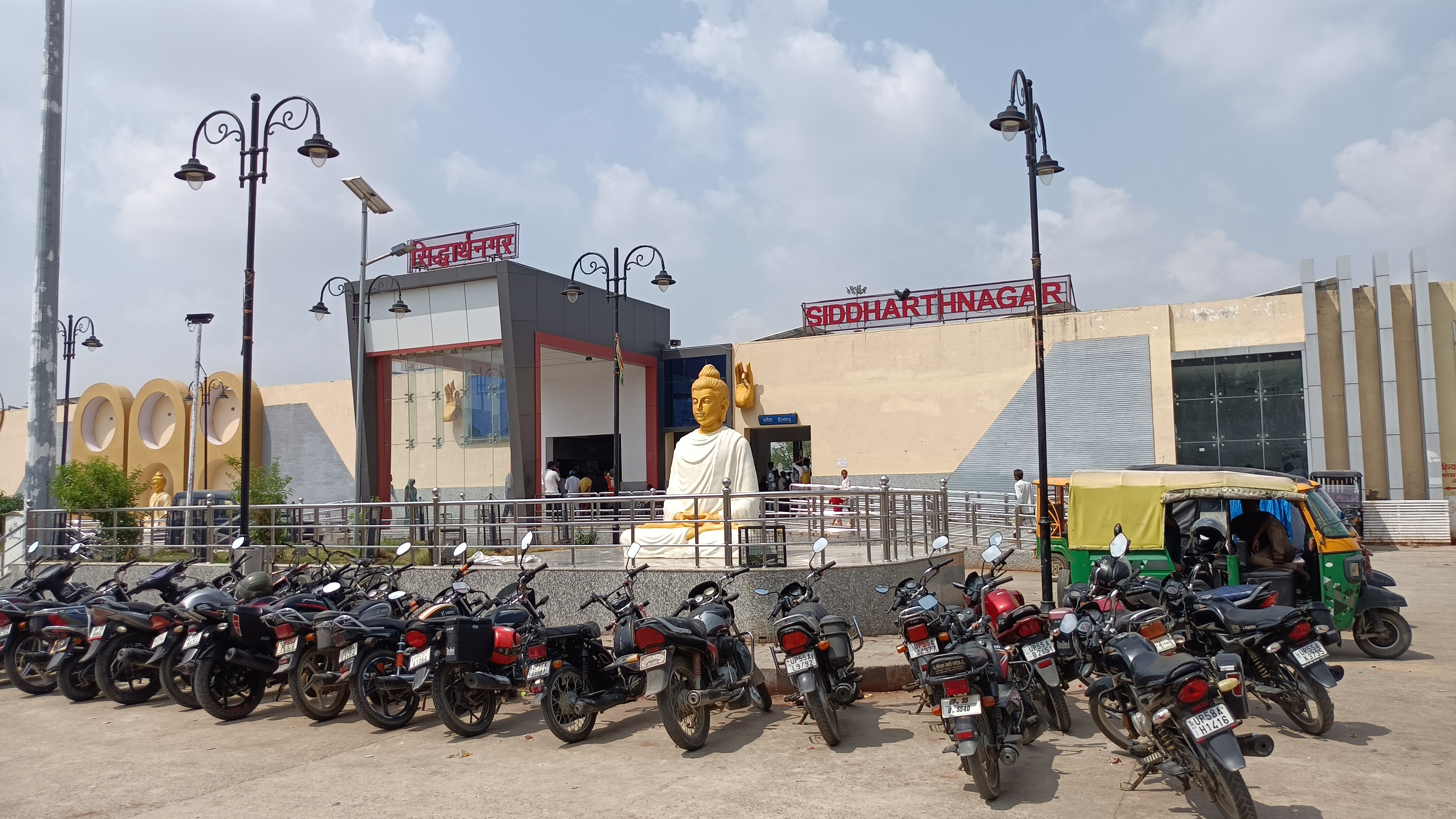
- Main Gate

General information
- Location: National Highway 730, Siddharthnagar, Uttar Pradesh; India
- Coordinates: 27.2747°N 83.0884°E
- Elevation: 91 metres (299 ft)
- System: Indian Railways station
- Owner: Indian Railways
- Operator: North Eastern Railway
- Platforms: 3
- Tracks: 4
- Connections: Auto stand

Construction
- Structure type: Standard (on-ground station)
- Parking: Yes
- Cycle facilities: Yes

Other information
- Status: SINGLE ELECTRIC LINE
- Station code: SDDN
- Zone(s): North Eastern Railway
- Division(s): Lucknow NER

History
- Rebuilt: 2024
- Electrified: 2023
- Former names: NAUGARH RAILWAY STATION

Services
FORM SIDDHARTHNAGAR (SDDN) YOU CAN GET TRAINS TO GORAKHPUR NARKATIAGANJ VARANSI DEOGHAR NEWJALPAIGURI KATIHAR GONDA LUCKNOW IZZATNAGAR DELHI AMRITSAR MUMBAI AND NAVI MUMBAI
Location
- Location within India Location within Uttar Pradesh

Siddharthnagar railway station is a famous railway station in Siddharthnagar district, Uttar Pradesh. Its code is SDDN. It serves Siddharthnagar. The station consists of three platforms.

The station is located on the way to Gorakhpur from Gonda via broad gauge of North Eastern Railway.

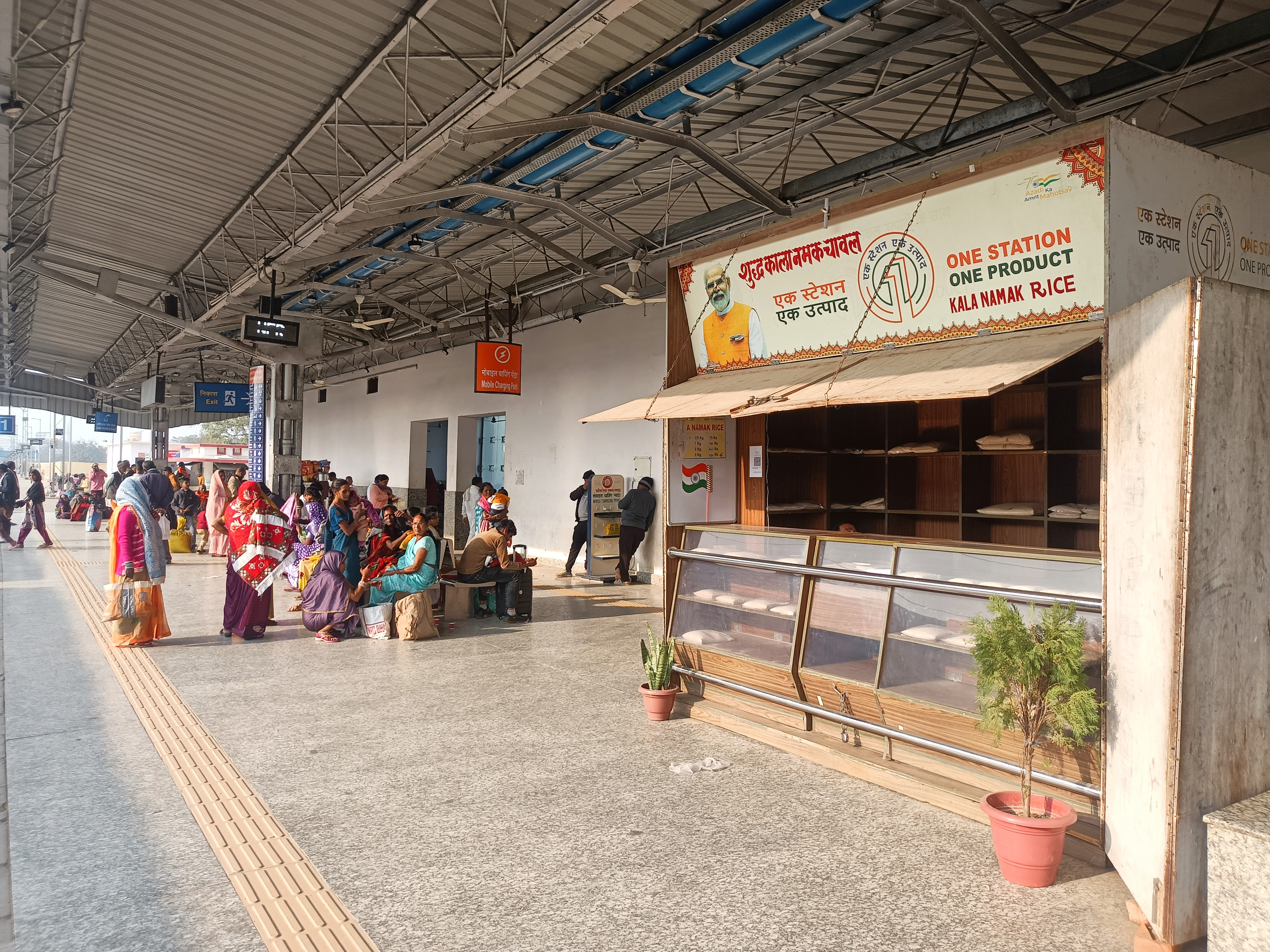
One District One Product (ODOP) retail outlet at the station where Kalanamak rice can be obtained which is product of Siddharthnagar district
