= Shohratgarh =

Town and tehsil in Uttar Pradesh, India

Shohratgarh शोहरतगढ़ / شہرت گڑھ Chhaanapar
- Town and Tehsil
- Location in Uttar Pradesh, India Shohratgarh (India)
- Coordinates: 27°23′35″N 82°57′24″E
- Country: India
- State: Uttar Pradesh
- District: Siddharthnagar

Government
  - Type: Nagar Panchayat
- Elevation: 94 m (308 ft)

Population (2011)
  - Total: 9,326

Languages
- Time zone: UTC+5:30 (IST)
- PIN: 272205
- Telephone code: 05544
- Vehicle registration: UP-55
- Website: siddharthnagar.nic.in

Shohratgarh (Hindi: शोहरतगढ़, Urdu: شہرت گڑھ) is a town, tehsil, and Nagar Panchayat in Siddharthnagar district in the Indian state of Uttar Pradesh. It is situated near the India–Nepal border in the Purvanchal region of eastern Uttar Pradesh.

== History ==
=== Origin and the Story of Chhaanapar ===
The region where modern-day Shohratgarh stands was historically known as Chhaanapar (छानापार). In ancient and medieval times, Chhaanapar was a small, rural agrarian settlement.

The transformation of Chhaanapar into Shohratgarh is deeply rooted in the history of the local zamindari estate. The town was systematically renamed and developed as "Shohratgarh" (meaning The Fort of Fame) in honor of Raja Shohrat Singh, a prominent local ruler and landlord whose lineage heavily contributed to the socioeconomic landscape, education, and institutional development of the region. The local zamindar family, associated with Raja Shivpati Singh, established institutions such as Shivpati PG College to promote higher education in the Purvanchal border region.

During the Indian independence movement, the town and its surrounding villages served as a active hub for freedom fighters in the United Provinces, contributing to local resistance against British rule.

== Demographics ==
According to the 2011 Census of India, Shohratgarh Nagar Panchayat had a population of 9,326, including 4,735 males and 4,591 females, establishing a sex ratio of 970 females per 1,000 males, which is notably higher than the Uttar Pradesh state average of 912.

The average literacy rate was 74.08%, higher than the Uttar Pradesh state average of 67.68%. Male literacy stood at 79.98%, while female literacy was 68.04%. Approximately 15% of the population is under six years of age.

=== Historical population ===
Historical population
| Year | Pop. | ±% |
|---|---|---|
| 1991 | 6,542 | — |
| 2001 | 8,336 | +27.4% |
| 2011 | 9,326 | +11.9% |

=== Religion ===
Religions in Shohratgarh town (2011)
1. Hinduism (63.4%)
2. Islam (36.3%)
3. Christianity (0.17%)
4. Sikhism (0.05%)
5. Buddhism (0.04%)
6. Other / not stated (0.09%)

According to the 2011 census, Hinduism is the majority religion in Shohratgarh (63.35%), followed by Islam (36.30%). Minor populations of Christians, Sikhs, Buddhists, and Jains also reside in the town.

== Civic administration and Law & Order ==
=== Municipality ===
Shohratgarh is governed by a Nagar Panchayat (Town Municipality). The urban area is divided into 10 structural wards, with local elections held every five years to elect ward councilors and the Nagar Panchayat Chairman. The municipality manages basic amenities like local water supply, sanitation, public lighting, and primary infrastructure development.

=== Law and Order ===
Law enforcement is managed by the Shohratgarh Police Station under the jurisdiction of the Siddharthnagar District Police and the Gorakhpur Police Zone. Due to its proximity to the Indo-Nepal international border (with major transit points like Khunwa and Barhni located nearby), security management involves active coordination with border security forces.

== Politics ==
Shohratgarh represents a distinct legislative block in state politics:

- Assembly Constituency (Vidhan Sabha): It is designated as the Shohratgarh Assembly constituency (Seat No. 302) of the Uttar Pradesh Legislative Assembly. Vinay Verma of the Apna Dal (Sonelal) [AD(S)] was elected as the Member of Legislative Assembly (MLA) during the 2022 general elections.
- Parliamentary Constituency (Lok Sabha): Shohratgarh falls under the Domariyaganj Lok Sabha constituency, representing its voice in the Parliament of India.

== Infrastructure and Economy ==
=== Transport ===
- Roadways: Shohratgarh is connected through National Highway 730 (NH-730), which links the town to major hubs like Gorakhpur, Kushinagar, Balrampur, Shravasti, and Pilibhit. This highway is a core part of the India–Japan Buddhist Circuit project.
- Railways: Shohratgarh railway station (Station Code: SOT) falls under the North Eastern Railway (NER) zone. Located on the Gorakhpur–Gonda loop line, it provides direct train connectivity to major cities including New Delhi, Mumbai, Lucknow, Kanpur, and Gorakhpur.

=== Healthcare ===
Primary health requirements are serviced through government-backed Primary Health Centres (PHCs) and Community Health Centres (CHCs) located within the tehsil. For advanced tertiary care, the population relies on the Madhav Prasad Tripathi State Allopathic Medical College and Hospital located in the district headquarters of Siddharthnagar (Naugarh).

=== Economy ===
The economy is predominantly agrarian. However, being a border-adjacent commercial block, retail trading, power back-up dealerships, and agro-processing industries (especially around the regional Kalanamak rice under the One District One Product scheme) drive local business operations.
