= Siddharthnagar district =

- District of Uttar Pradesh
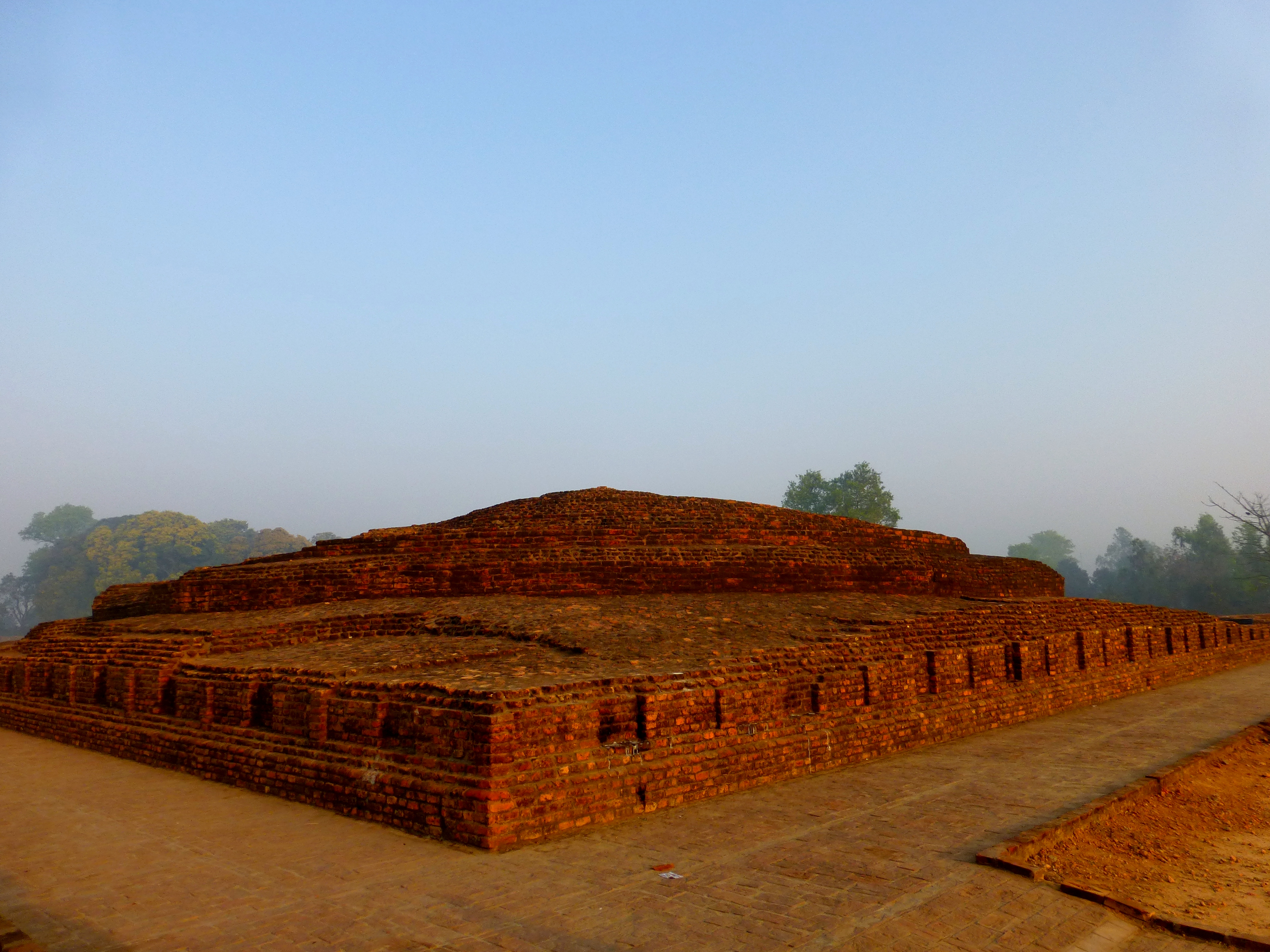
- Stupa at Piprahwa

- Location of Siddharthnagar district in Uttar Pradesh
- Coordinates (Siddharthnagar): 27°0′N 82°45′E - 27°28′N 83°10′E
- Country: India
- State: Uttar Pradesh
- Division: Basti
- Headquarters: Siddharthnagar
- Tehsils: 1.Siddharthnagar(Naugarh); 2.Shohratgarh; 3.Bansi; 4.Itwa; 5.Domariyaganj

Government
  - Lok Sabha constituencies: Domariyaganj
  - District Magistrate: Dr.Rajaganpathy R Sir

Area
  - Total: 2,895 km^{2} (1,118 sq mi)

Population (2011)
  - Total: 2,559,297
  - Density: 882/km^{2} (2,280/sq mi)

Demographics
  - Literacy: 59.2%
  - Sex ratio: 976
- Time zone: UTC+05:30 (IST)
- Vehicle registration: UP-55
- Languages: Hindi, Bhojpuri, Awadhi
- Website: siddharthnagar.nic.in

Siddharthnagar district is one of the 75 districts of the Indian state of Uttar Pradesh. Siddharthnagar is the district headquarters. Siddharthnagar district is a part of Basti division. It was under the ancient Kosala kingdom and also the Shakya kingdoms.

== Administrative divisions ==
=== Tehsils ===
Siddharthnagar district comprises five tehsils or sub-divisions each headed by a Sub-Divisional Magistrate (SDM):

1. Naugarh
2. Bansi
3. Domariyaganj
4. Itwa
5. Shohratgarh

=== Blocks ===
These Tehsils are further divided into 14 Blocks, each headed by a Block Development Officer (BDO):

1. Naugarh
2. Barhani Bazar
3. Shohratgarh
4. Birdpur
5. Jogia
6. Uska Bazar
7. Bansi
8. Methwal
9. Khesraha
10. Bhanwapur
11. Itwa
12. Khuniyaon
13. Domariaganj
14. Lotan

== Demographics ==
Historical population
Year	Pop.	±% p.a.
1901	701,884	—
1911	695,902	−0.09%
1921	731,947	+0.51%
1931	790,038	+0.77%
1941	830,952	+0.51%
1951	907,736	+0.89%
1961	962,262	+0.59%
1971	1,089,054	+1.25%
1981	1,300,583	+1.79%
1991	1,607,964	+2.14%
2001	2,040,085	+2.41%
2011	2,559,297	+2.29%

=== Religion ===
Religions in Siddharthnagar district (2011)
Religion	Percent
Hinduism	69.93%
Islam	29.23%
Buddhism	0.47%
Other or not stated	0.37%

According to the 2011 census, Siddharthnagar district has a population of 2,559,297, roughly equal to the nation of Kuwait or the US state of Nevada. This gives it a ranking of 164th in India (out of a total of 640). The district has a population density of 882 inhabitants per square kilometre (2,280/sq mi). Its population growth rate over the decade 2001-2011 was 25.17%. Siddharthnagar has a sex ratio of 970 females for every 1000 males, and a literacy rate of 67.81%. 6.28% of the population lived in urban areas. Scheduled Castes and Scheduled Tribes made up 15.97% and 0.47% of the population respectively.

=== Languages ===
Languages of Siddharthnagar district (2011)
1. Hindi (80.5%)
2. Bhojpuri (10.1%)
3. Urdu (4.73%)
4. Awadhi (4.61%)
5. Others (0.09%)

At the time of the 2011 Census of India, 80.51% of the population in the district spoke Hindi, 10.06% Bhojpuri, 4.73% Urdu and 4.61% Awadhi as their first language.

The minority population is about 27% of the total population of the district. Siddharthnagar is a category "A" district; that is, it has socio-economic and basic amenities parameters below the national average.

== History ==
Some scholars have suggested that modern-day Piprahwa-Ganwaria was the site of the ancient city of Kapilavastu, the capital of the Shakya kingdom, where Siddhartha Gautama spent the first 29 years of his life, referring to Buddhist texts such as the Pāli Canon. Others suggest that the original site of Kapilavastu is located 16 kilometres (9.9 mi) to the northwest, at Tilaurakot, in what is currently Kapilvastu District in Nepal.

== Geography ==
Siddharthnagar district lies between 27°N to 27°28'N and 82°45'E to 83°10'E. It is part of Purvanchal. The district borders Nepal's Kapilvastu district on the north and Rupandehi district on the northeast. Otherwise, it is surrounded by other districts of Uttar Pradesh: Maharajganj on the east, Basti and Sant Kabir Nagar on the south, and Balrampur on the west. Siddharthnagar's area is 2,895 km^{2}.

== Economy ==
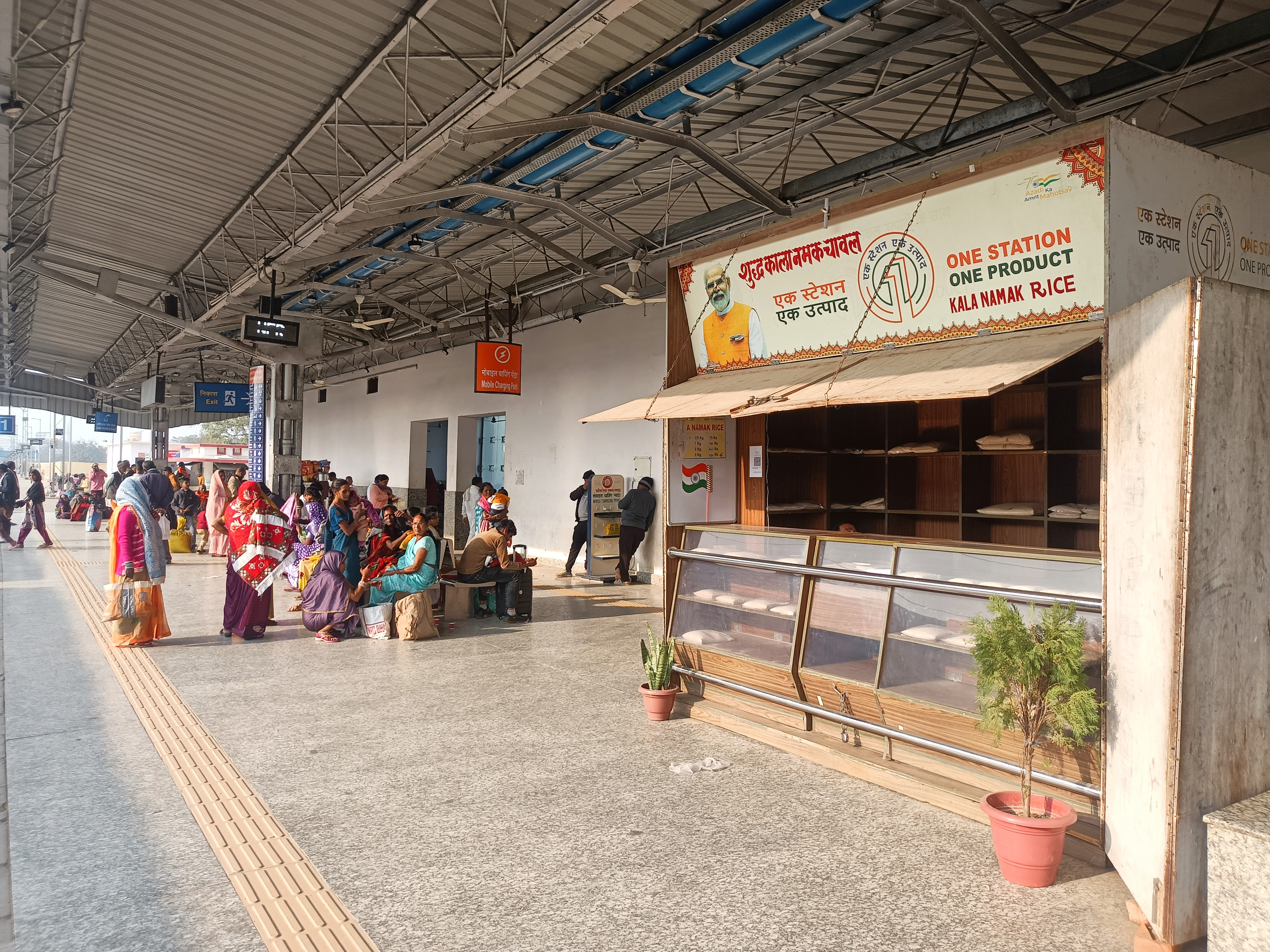
One District One Product (ODOP) retail outlet at the station where Kalanamak rice can be obtained which is product of the Siddharthnagar district.

In 2006, the Ministry of Panchayati Raj named Siddharthnagar one of the country's 250 most backward districts (out of a total of 640). It is one of the 34 districts in Uttar Pradesh currently receiving funds from the Backward Regions Grant Fund Programme (BRGF).

Kalanamak rice is grown in Siddharthnagar district.

== Education ==
=== University and Colleges ===
- Siddharth University is a state university in Kapilvastu, Siddharthnagar, Uttar Pradesh.
- Madhav Prasad Tripathi Medical College and Hospital, a government medical college in Siddharthnagar.

== Notable people ==
Notable people from the district include:

- Kazi Jalil Abbasi, former minister of UP Government, former MLA of Domariyaganj Assembly constituency and former MP Domariyaganj (Lok Sabha constituency).
- Jagdambika Pal, former chief minister of UP Government and current Member of Parliament for Domariyaganj (Lok Sabha constituency).
- Mata Prasad Pandey, former speaker of UP Assembly MLA for Itwa.
- Brij Bhushan Tiwari, former MP Domariyaganj (Lok Sabha constituency).
- Mohammed Muqueem, former MP Domariyaganj (Lok Sabha constituency) and former MLA Itwa Assembly constituency.
- Jai Pratap Singh, Former Minister of Health Uttar Pradesh MLA for Bansi Assembly constituency.
- Satish Chandra Dwivedi, Minister of state (Independent charge) MLA for Itwa.
- Shyam Dhani, MLA Kapilvastu.
- Amar Singh Chaudhary, MLA Shohratgarh.
- Raghvendra Pratap Singh, MLA Domariyaganj.
- Keshav Dev Malviya, Father of Indian petroleum industry.
- Yogendra Singh, Sociologist
- Saiyada Khatoon, MLA Domariyaganj.
