= Jainagar =

Jainagar may refer to these places in India:

- Jainagar (community development block), in the Koderma district, Jharkhand
  - Jainagar, Koderma, a village in Jharkhand
- Jainagar, Bihar, a town in Madhubani district, Bihar
  - Barauni–Gorakhpur, Raxaul and Jainagar lines, a set of the three railway lines in the Indian Railways
- Jainagar, Maharashtra, a town in Nandurbar district, Maharashtra
- Jainagar, Ramgarh, a census town in Ramgarh district, Jharkhand

== See also ==
- Jaynagar (disambiguation)
- Jayanagar (disambiguation)
- Jai Nagarkatti, Indian-American chemist and businessman, served as the president of the Sigma Aldrich
