= Gorakhpur–Amritsar Jan Sadharan Express =

Train in India

Gorakhpur Junction – Amritsar Junction Jan Sadharan Express

Overview
- Service type: Jan Sadharan Express
- First service: 3 December 2014; 11 years ago
- Current operator: Northern Railways

Route
- Termini: Gorakhpur (GKP); Amritsar (ASR)
- Stops: 14
- Distance travelled: 1,087 km (675 mi)
- Average journey time: 19h 45m
- Service frequency: Weekly (Note: Runs one day in a week for every direction.)
- Train number: 22423 / 22424

On-board services
- Class: General Unreserved
- Seating arrangements: No
- Sleeping arrangements: Yes
- Catering facilities: No
- Observation facilities: Large windows

Technical
- Rolling stock: LHB coach
- Track gauge: 1,676 mm (5 ft 6 in)
- Operating speed: 55 km/h (34 mph) average including halts
- Rake sharing: 14603/14604 Saharsa–Amritsar Jan Sadharan Express (via Sirhind)
Route map
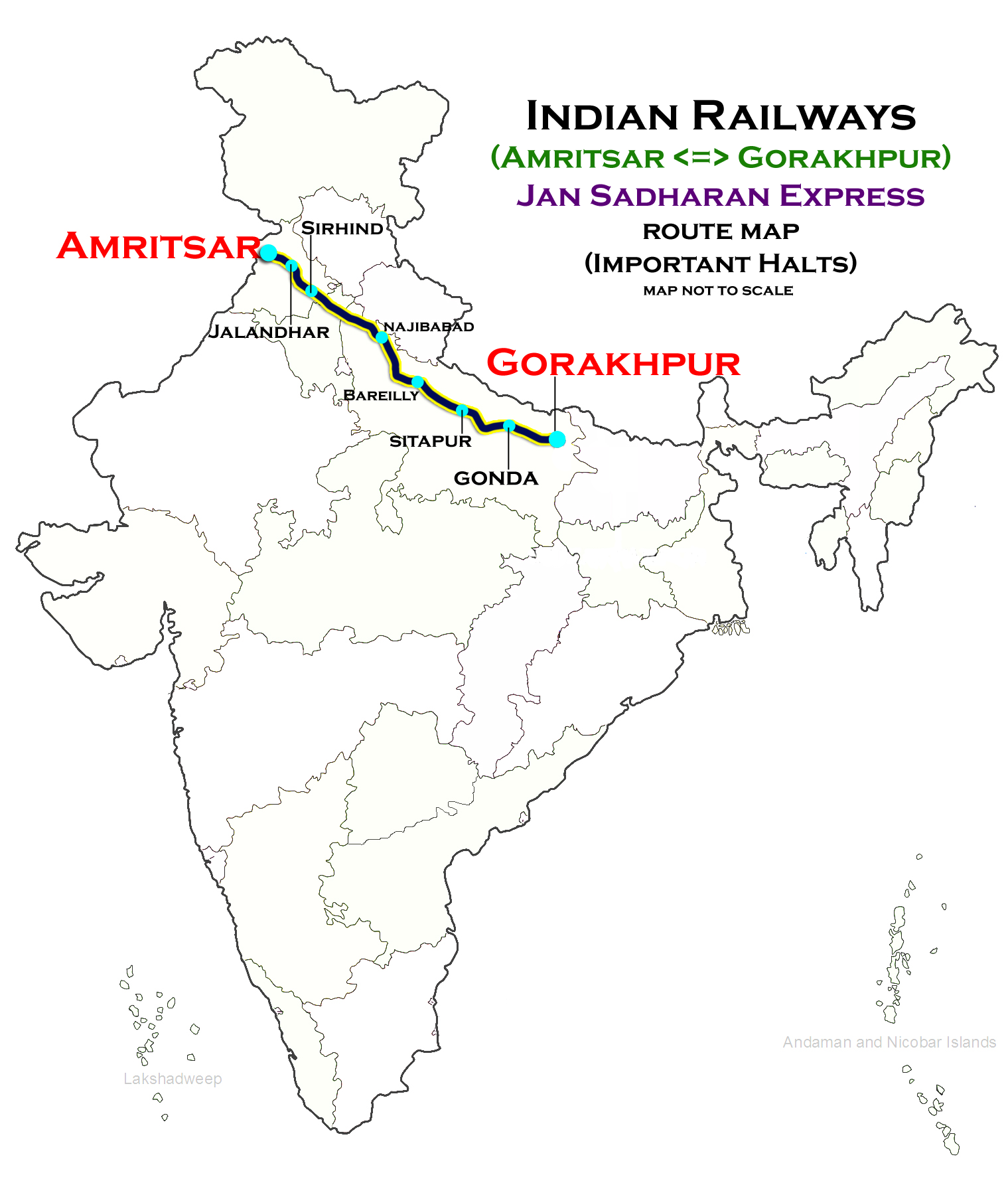

The 22423 / 22424 Gorakhpur–Amritsar Jan Sadharan Express is an Express train belonging to Northern Railway zone that runs between Gorakhpur Junction and Amritsar Junction in India. It is currently being operated with 22423/22424 train numbers on a weekly basis.

== Service ==
The 22423/Gorakhpur–Amritsar Jansadharan Express has an average speed of 55 km/h and covers 1087 km in 19h 55m. The 22424/Amritsar–Gorakhpur Jansadharan Express has an average speed of 56 km/h and covers 1087 km in 19h 20m.

== Route & halts ==
The important halts of the train are:

- Gorakhpur
- Khalilabad
- Basti
- Mankapur Junction
- Gonda Junction
- Sitapur
- Shahjahanpur
- Tilhar
- Bareilly
- Moradabad
- Saharanpur
- Ambala Cantonment
- Ludhiana
- Phagwara
- Jalandhar City
- Beas Junction
- Amritsar

== Coach composition ==
The train has standard Hybrid-LHB rakes with max speed of 130 kmph. The train consists of 18 coaches:

- 16 General Unreserved
- 2 Seating cum Luggage Rake

== Traction ==
Both trains are hauled by a Ghaziabad-based WAP-5 or WAP-4 electric locomotive from Gorakhpur to Amritsar and vice versa.

== See also ==
- Gorakhpur Junction railway station
- Amritsar Junction railway station
- Danapur–Anand Vihar Jan Sadharan Express
- Saharsa–Amritsar Jan Sadharan Express (via Sirhind)
- Saharsa–Amritsar Jan Sadharan Express (via Chandigarh)
