= Jan Sadharan Express =

Series of train services in India

- Jan Sadharan Express

Overview
- Service type: Un-reserved travel
- Status: Active
- First service: 2 October 2004; 20 years ago
- Successor: Antyodaya Express
- Current operator(s): Indian Railways
- Website: http://indianrail.gov.in

On-board services
- Class(es): Unreserved General
- Seating arrangements: Yes
- Sleeping arrangements: No
- Catering facilities: On board Vendors sale
- Entertainment facilities: Electric outlets
- Baggage facilities: Underseat & Overhead racks
- Other facilities: Fire Extinguishers; Purified water dispensers

Technical
- Rolling stock: LHB-Jan Sadharan
- Track gauge: 5 ft 6 in (1,676 mm) broad gauge
- Track owner(s): Indian Railways

Jan Sadharan Express trains are series of passenger services operated by Indian Railways in different routes. These trains are the first generation of fully unreserved express train sets. The second generation is the Antyodya Express.

== About ==
Jan Sadharan Express trains are a series of passenger services operated by Indian Railways on the lines of Rajdhani Express, Jan Shatabdi Express, etc. Jan Sadharan Express trains are fully unreserved trains thereby providing cheaper transport aimed at common people. The services were first announced during the Interim Rail budget on 30 January 2004. Muzaffarpur–Ahmedabad Jansadharan Express and Muzaffarpur–Lokmanya Tilak Terminus Jansadharan Express, were announced as weekly service during the full rail budget on 6 July 2004, of which the latter was introduced on 2 October 2004 along with new service of Hajipur–Ahmedabad Jansadharan Express. During 2007–2008 Railway Budget, a new route of Chhapra–Chhatrapati Shivaji Terminus Jansadharan Express was added to the list. During 2008–2009 Railway Budget, Amritsar–Saharsa Jan Sadharan Express was introduced. During 2009–2010 Interim Railway Budget, Barauni–Delhi Jan Sadharan Express was introduced. During 2014–2015 Railway Budget, 5 more Jan Sadharan Express trains were introduced, which were Ahmedabad – Darbhanga Jan Sadharan Express, Jaynagar – Mumbai Jan Sadharan Express, Mumbai – Gorakhpur Jan Sadharan Express, Gorakhpur - Amritsar Jan Sadharan Express, Saharsa – Anand Vihar Jan Sadharan Express and Saharsa - Amritsar Jan Sadharan Express.

== Active services ==
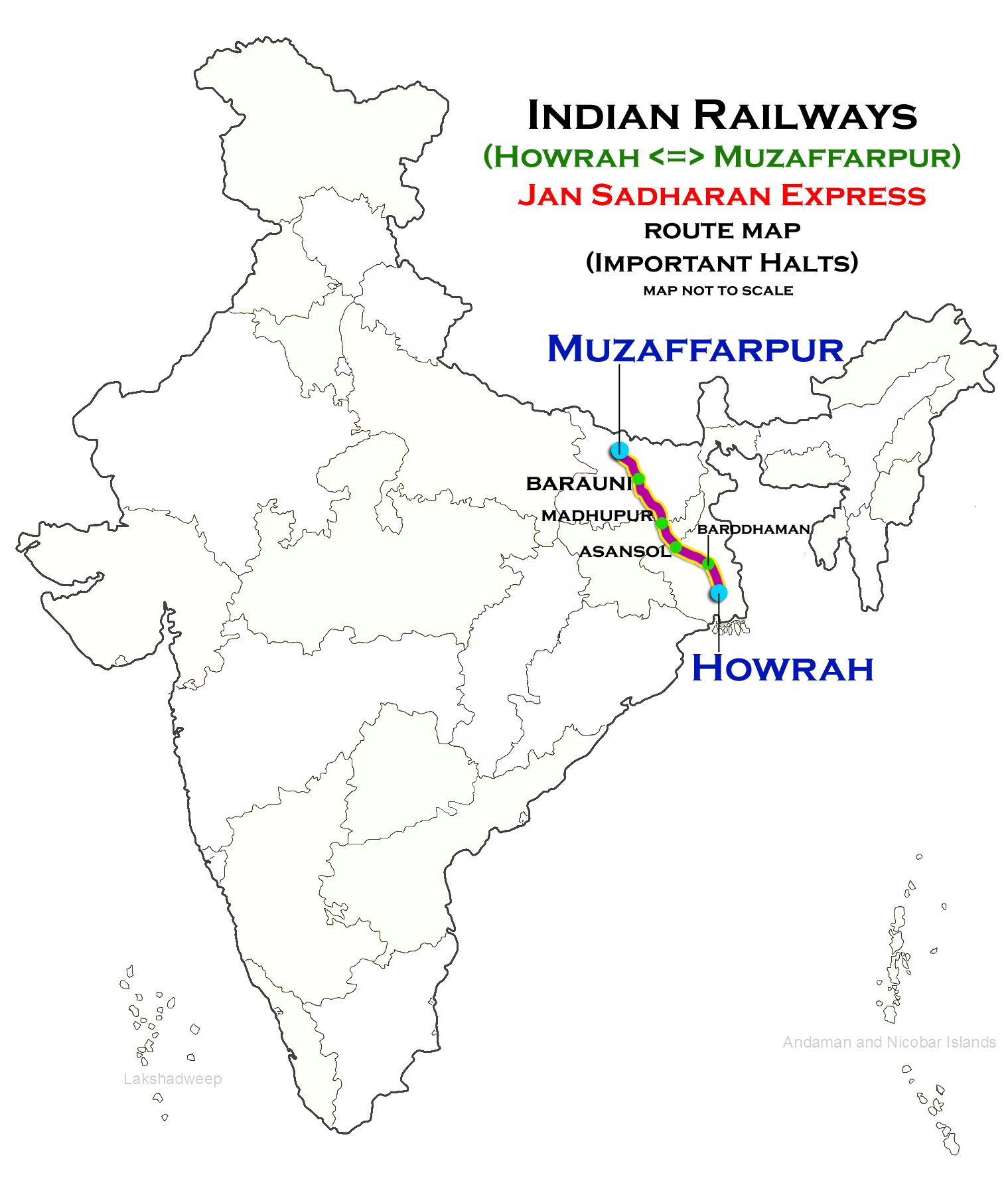
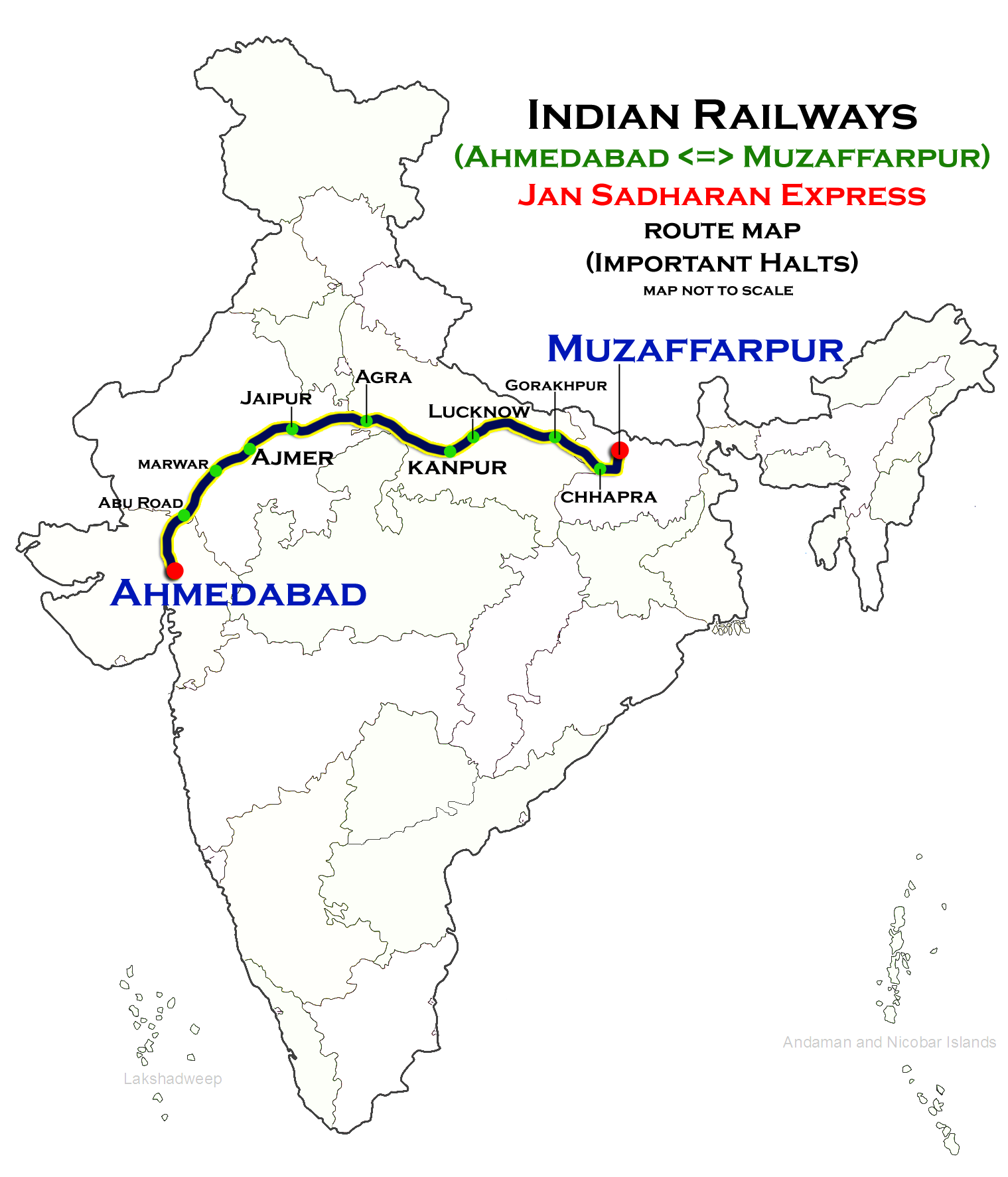
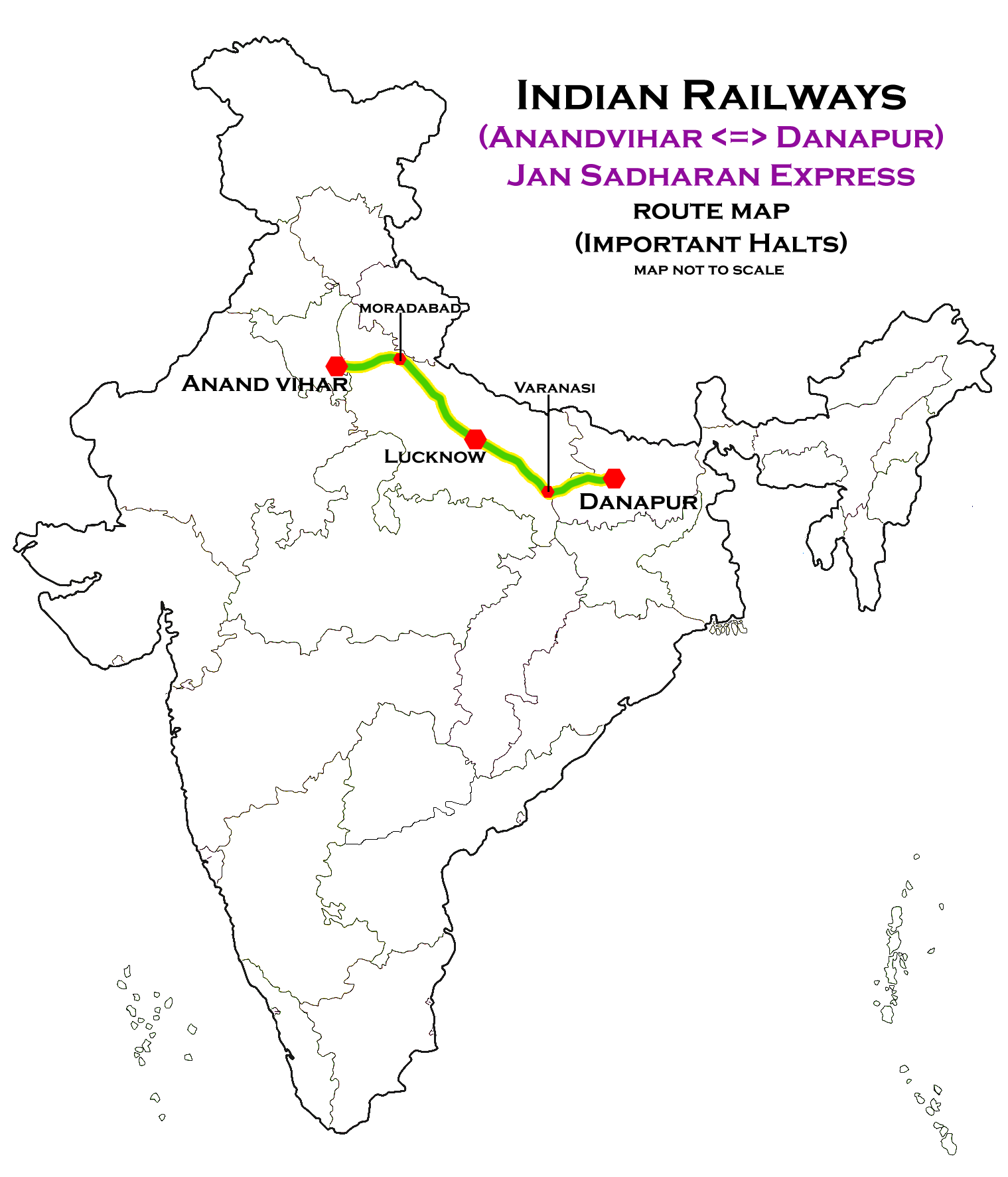
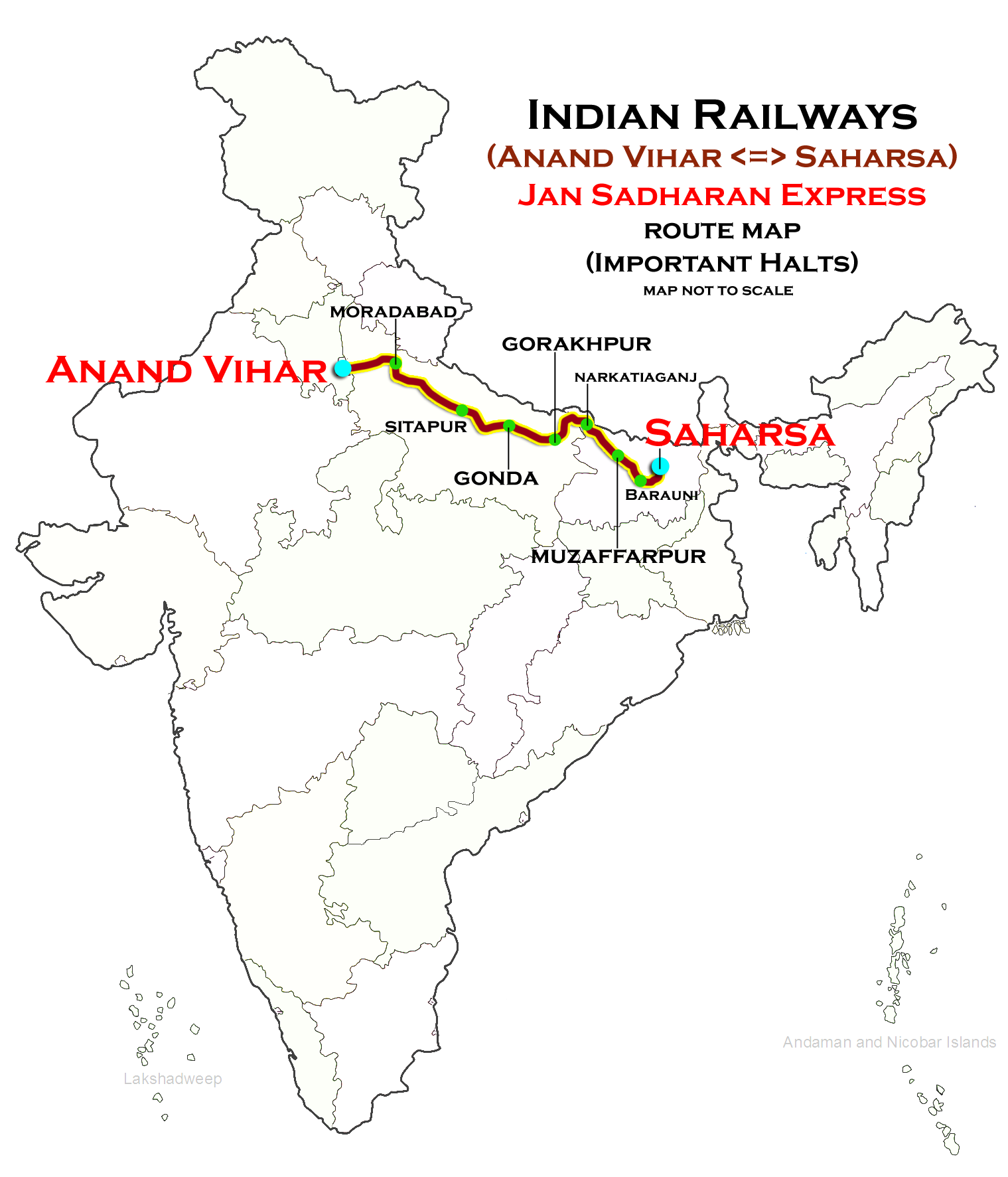
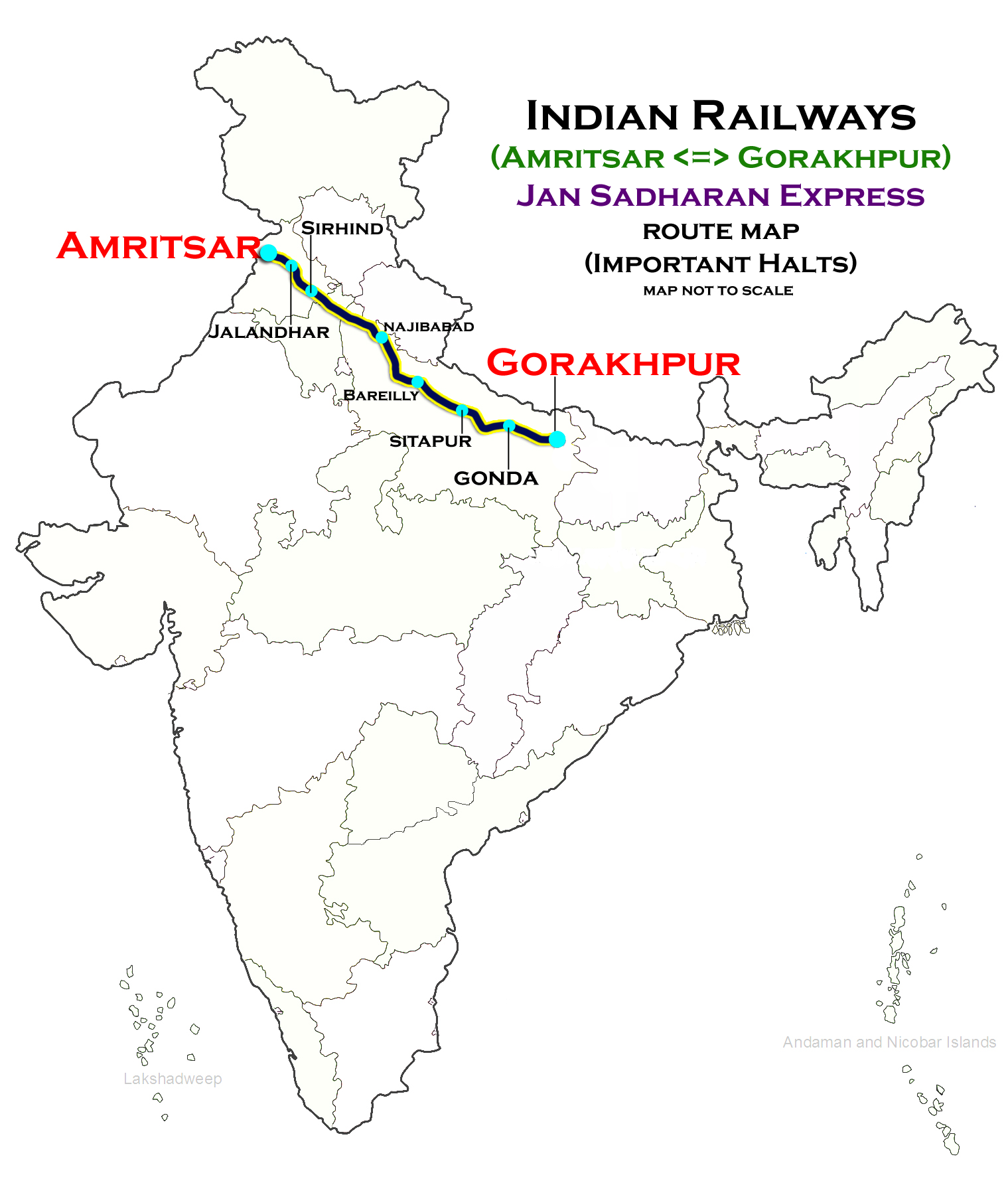
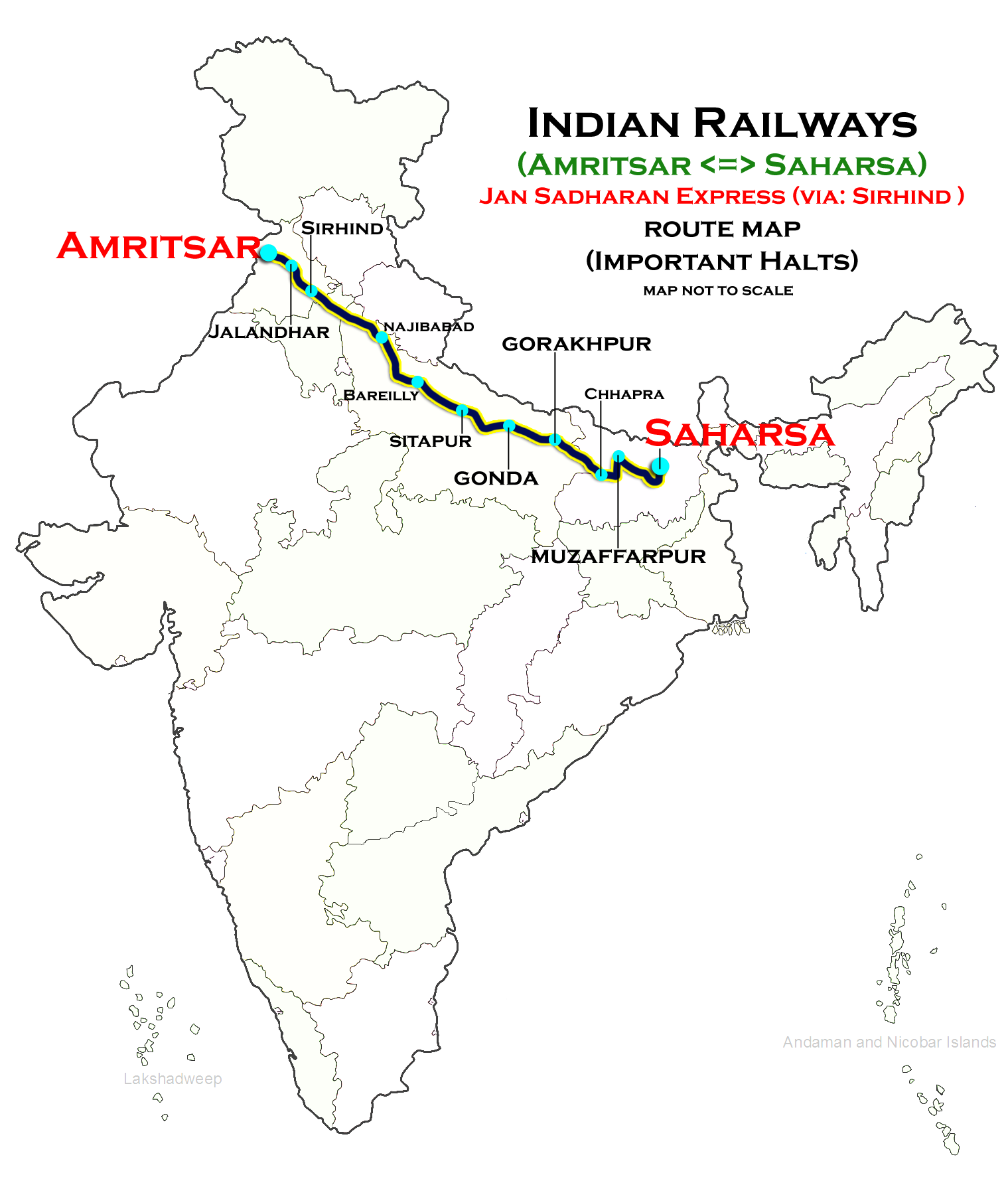
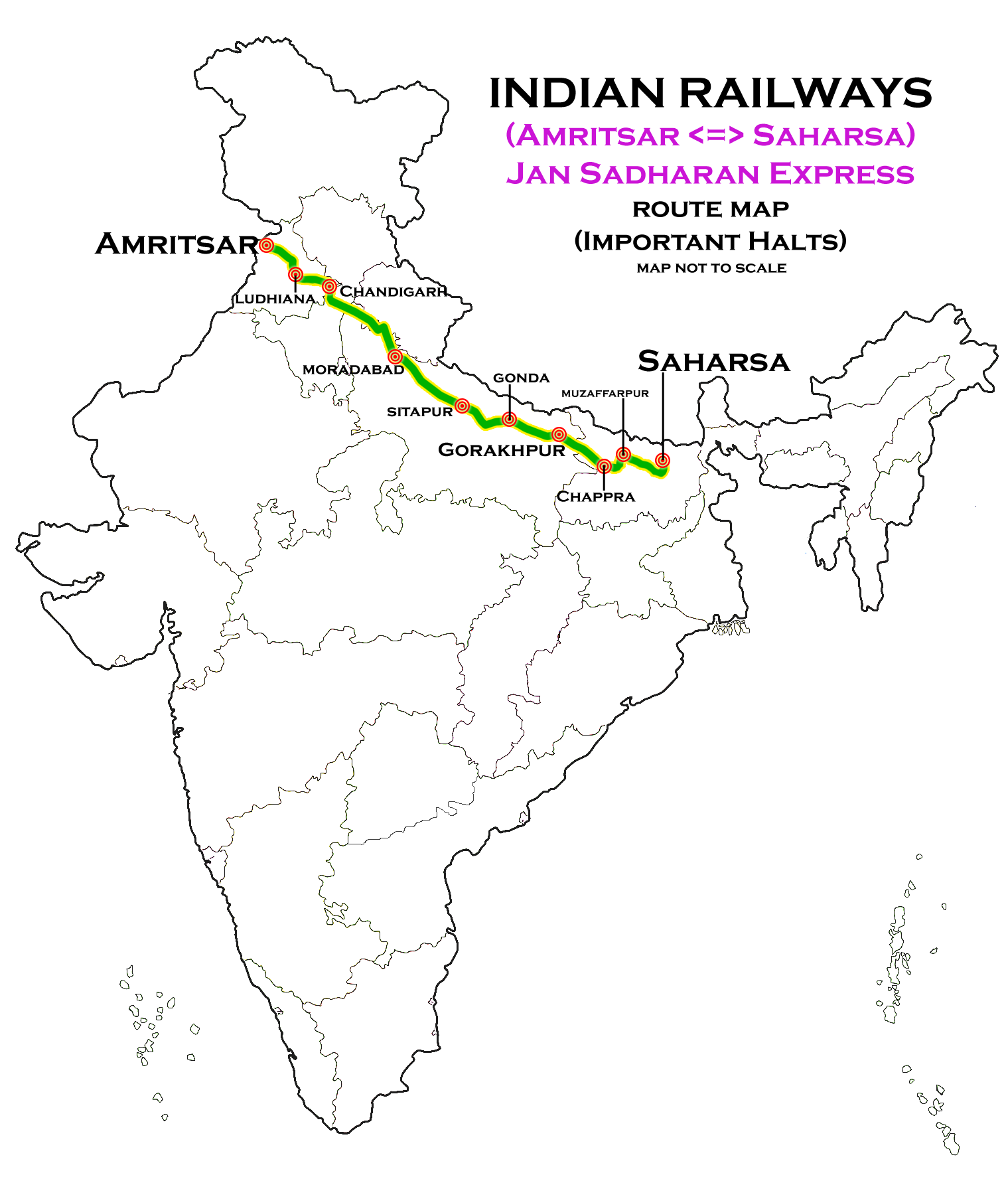
| Sl. No | Train No | Sector | Distance | Route map (click on map to view) |
|---|---|---|---|---|
| 1 | 15271/15272 | Howrah–Muzaffarpur | 549 km (341 mi) |
| 2 | 15269/15270 | Muzaffarpur–Sabarmati (Ahmedabad) | 1,756 km (1,091 mi) |
| 3 | 13257/13258 | Danapur–Anand Vihar Terminal | 982 km (610 mi) |
| 4 | 15529/15530 | Saharsa–Anand Vihar Terminal | 1,918 km (1,192 mi) |
| 5 | 22423/22424 | Gorakhpur - Amritsar | 1,087 km (675 mi) |
| 6 | 14603/14604 | Saharsa - Amritsar (via Sirhind) | 1,568 km (974 mi) |
| 7 | 15531/15532 | Saharsa - Amritsar (via Chandigarh) | 1,612 km (1,002 mi) |

== Upgraded to Antyodaya Express ==
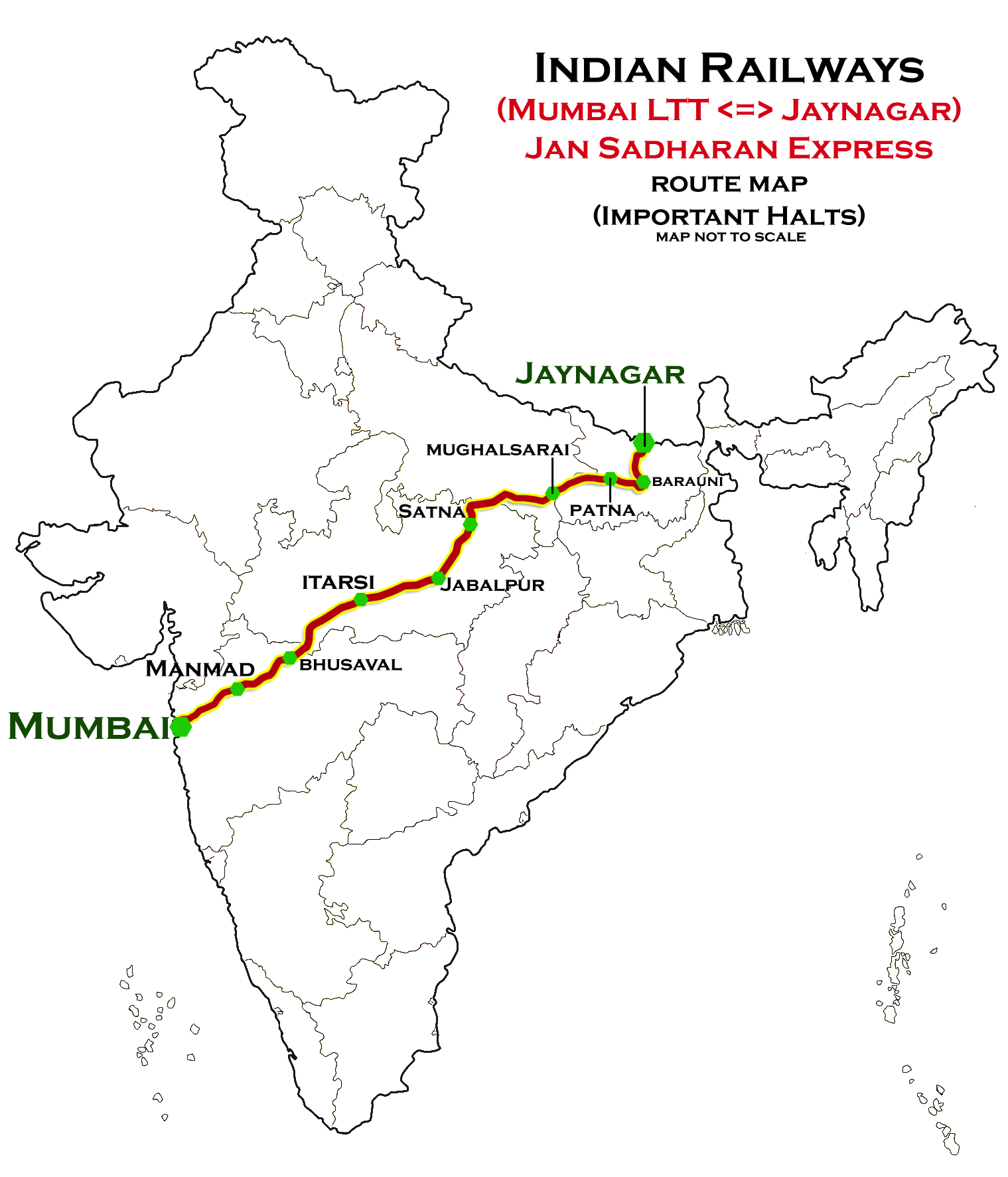
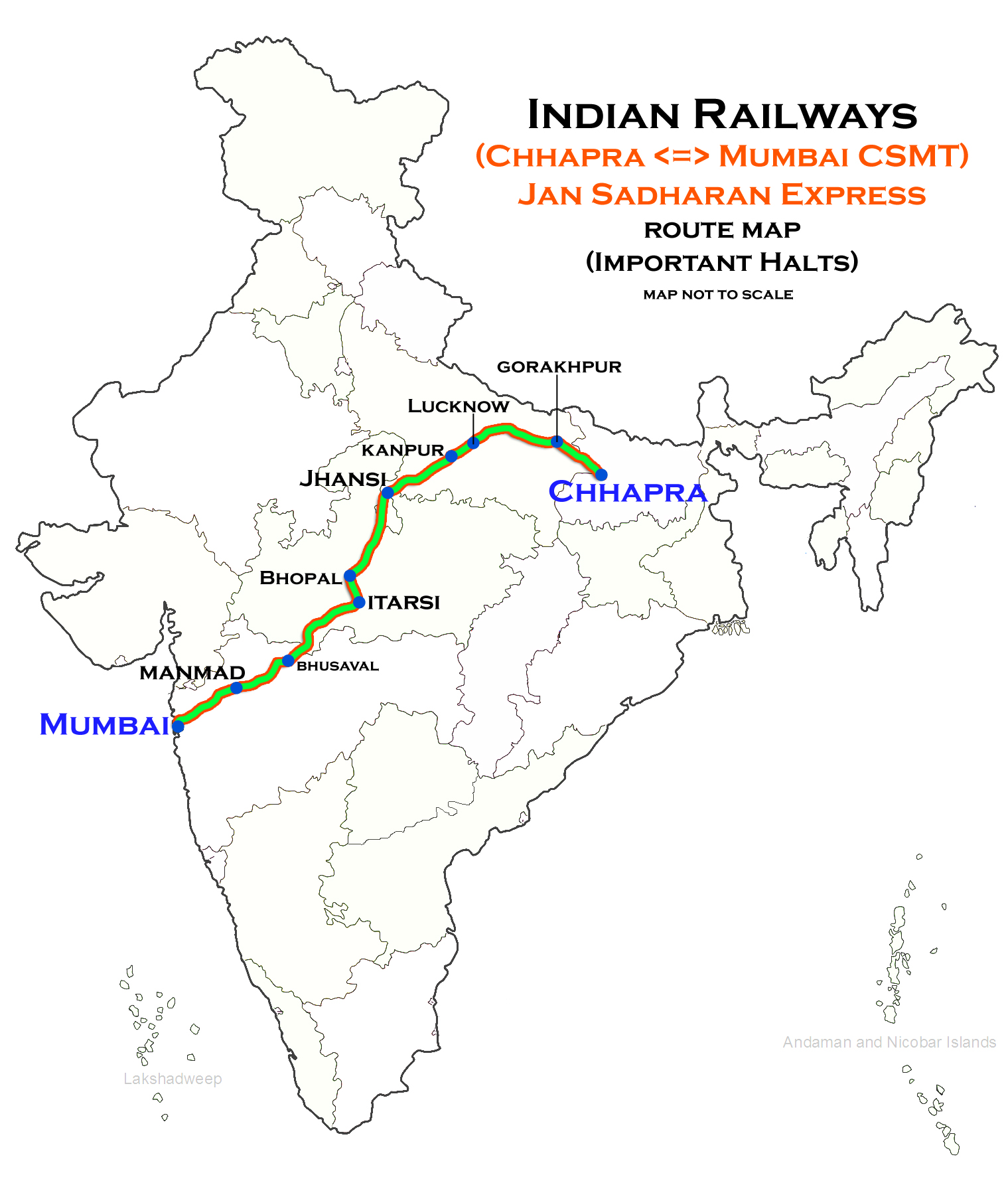
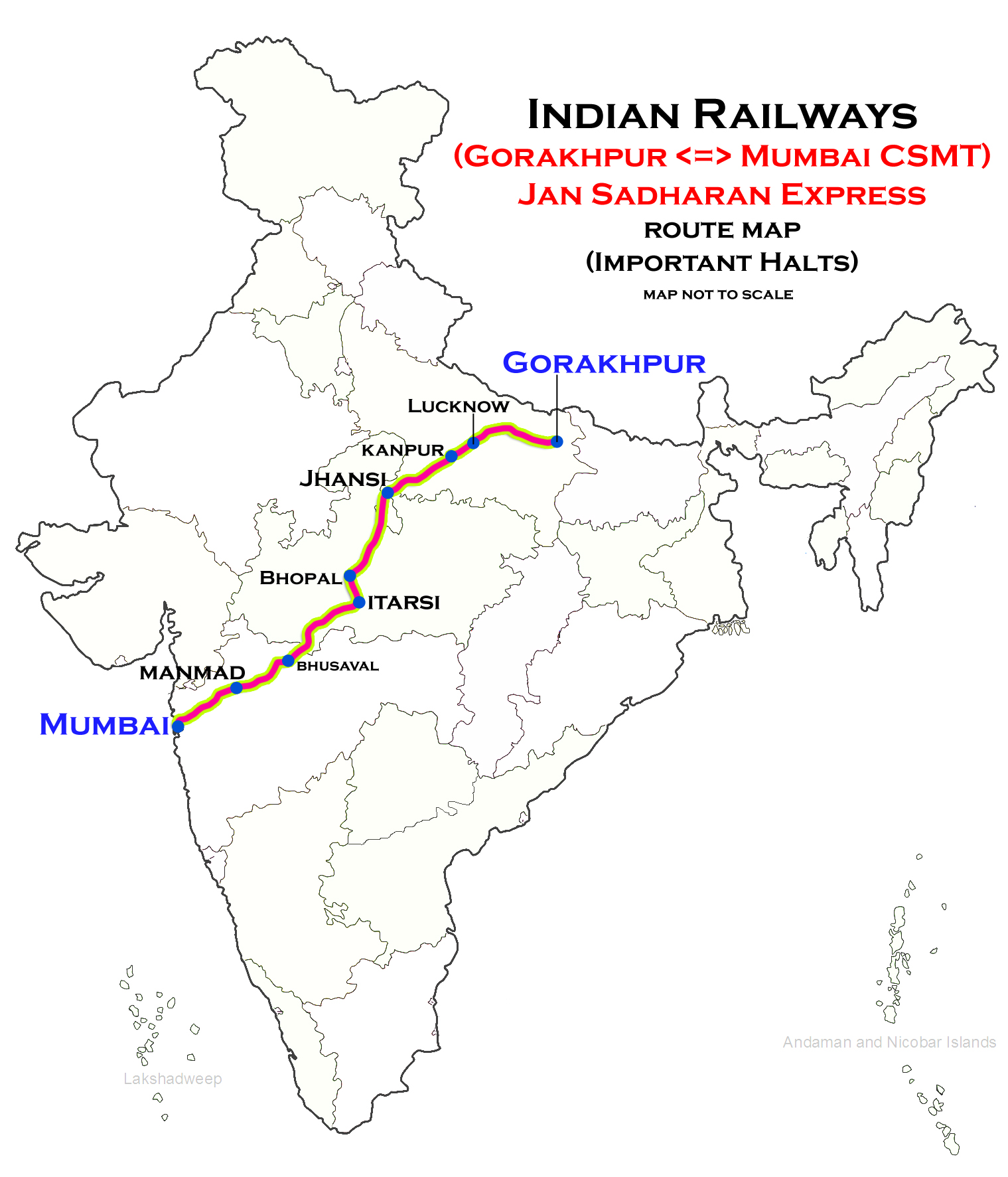
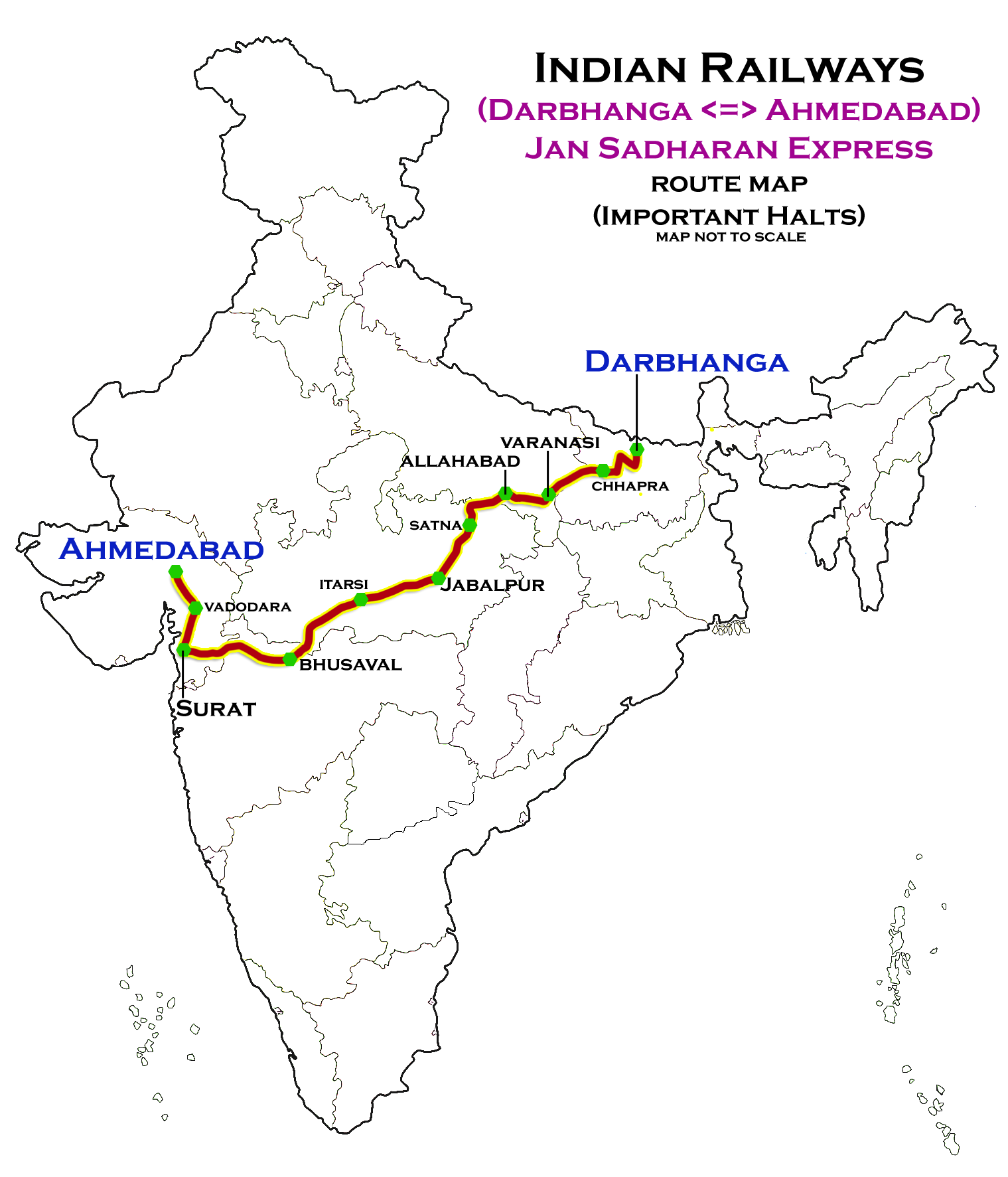
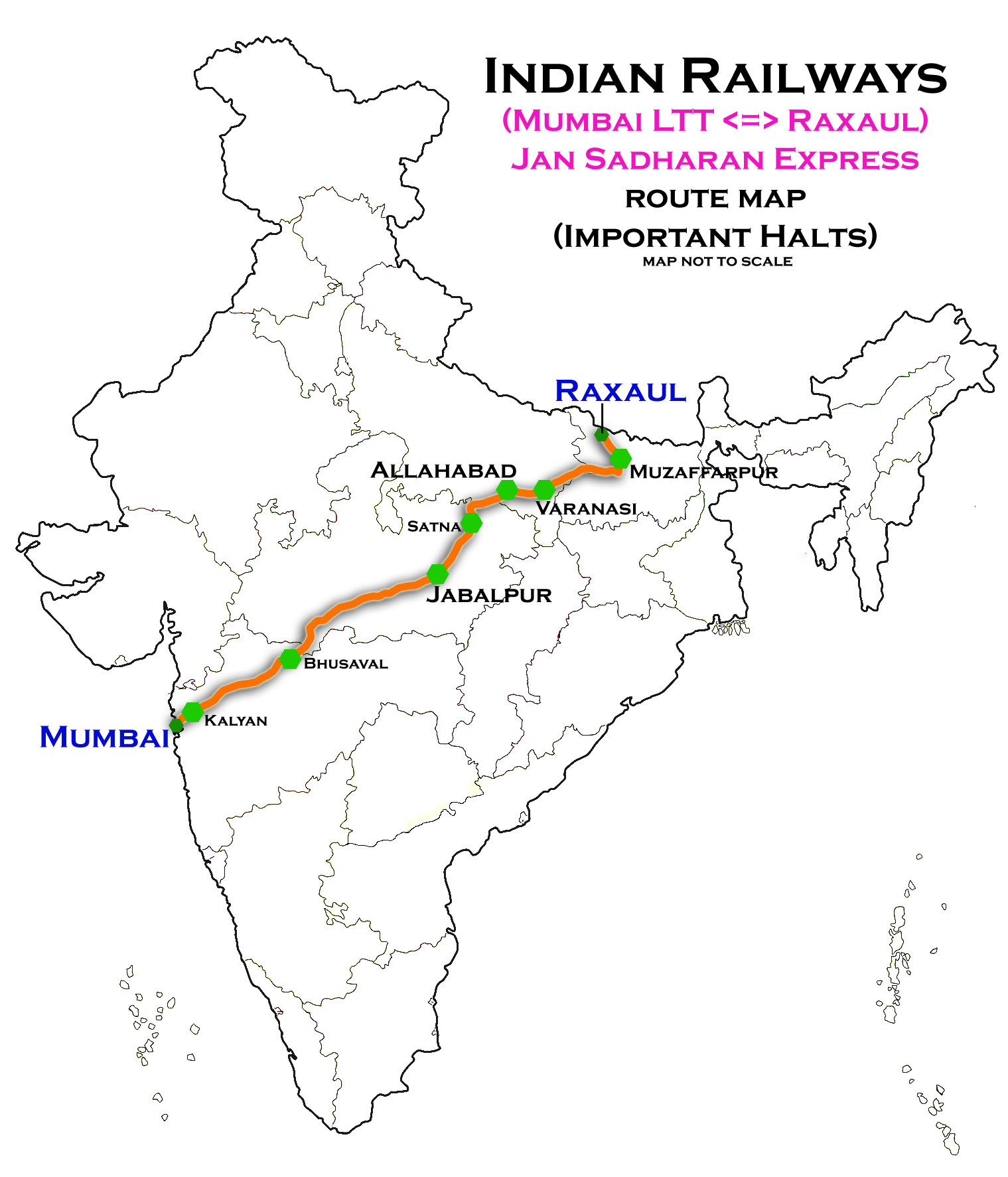
| Sl. No | Train No | Sector | Distance | Route map (click on map to view) |
|---|---|---|---|---|
| 1 | 15547/15548 | Jaynagar - Lokmanya Tilak Terminus (Mumbai) | 1,958 km (1,217 mi) |
| 2 | 15101/15102 | Chhapra–Mumbai CSMT | 1,882 km (1,169 mi) |
| 3 | 12597/12598 | Gorakhpur–Mumbai CSMT | 1,694 km (1,053 mi) |
| 4 | 15559/15560 | Darbhanga–Ahmedabad | 2,016 km (1,253 mi) |
| 5 | 15267/15268 | Raxaul–Lokmanya Tilak Terminus (Mumbai) | 1,916 km (1,191 mi) |

The above trains are converted into antyodya express trains.

=== Defunct ===
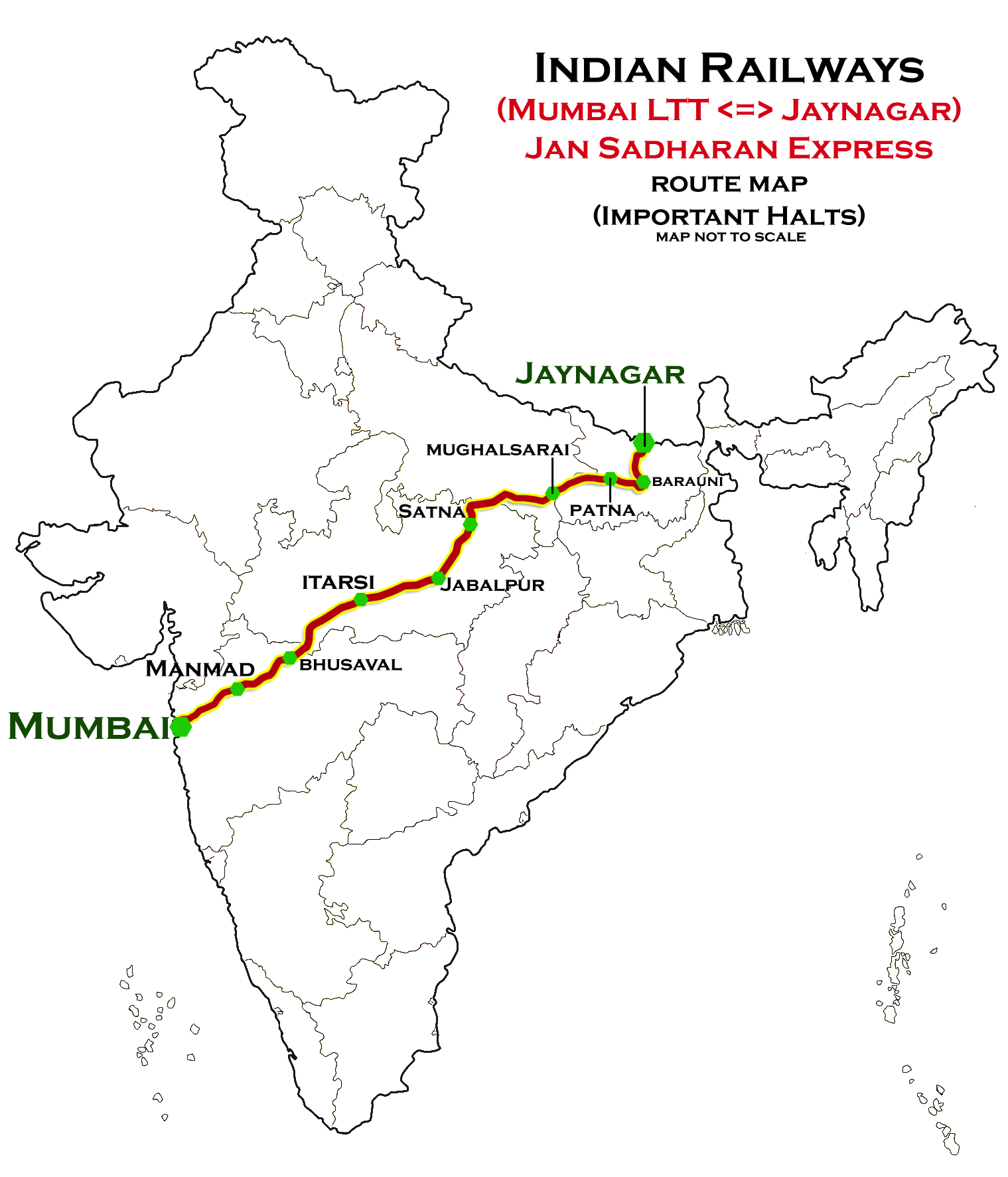
| Sl. No | Train No | Sector | Distance | Route map (click on map to view) |
|---|---|---|---|---|
| 1 | 15547/15548 | Jaynagar - Lokmanya Tilak Terminus (Mumbai) | 1,958 km (1,217 mi) |
