= Jaynagar =

Jaynagar may refer to:

- Jaynagar Majilpur, a town of the South 24 Parganas district in the Indian state of West Bengal
- Jaynagar Majilpur Municipality, a municipality of the South 24 Parganas district in the Indian state of West Bengal
- Jaynagar Majilpur railway station, a railway station of the South 24 Parganas district in the Indian state of West Bengal
- Jaynagar I, a community development block of the South 24 Parganas district in the Indian state of West Bengal
- Jaynagar II, a community development block of the South 24 Parganas district in the Indian state of West Bengal
- Jaynagar (Vidhan Sabha constituency), a legislative assembly constituency of the South 24 Parganas district in the Indian state of West Bengal
- Jaynagar (Lok Sabha constituency), a parliamentary constituency of the South 24 Parganas district in the Indian state of West Bengal
- Jaynagar Institution, a government-sponsored high school of the South 24 Parganas district in the Indian state of West Bengal
- Jaynagarer Moa, a confectionery of the South 24 Parganas district in the Indian state of West Bengal
- Jaynagar, Bihar, a town of the Madhubani district in the Indian state of Bihar
- Jaynagar railway station, a railway station of the Madhubani district in the Indian state of Bihar
- Jaynagar–Patna Intercity Express, an express train in the Indian Railways
- Jaynagar–Ranchi Express, an express train in the Indian Railways
- Jaynagar–Anand Vihar Garib Rath Express, an express train in the Indian Railways
- Jaynagar–Lokmanya Tilak Terminus Antyodaya Express, an express train in the Indian Railways
- Jaynagar−Rajendra Nagar Terminal Intercity Express, an express train in the Indian Railways
- Jaynagar–Udhna Antyodaya Express, an express train in the Indian Railways
- Howrah–Jaynagar Passenger, an express train in the Indian Railways
- Kolkata–Jaynagar Weekly Express, an express train in the Indian Railways
- Puri–Jaynagar Express, an express train in the Indian Railways

== See also ==
- Jayanagar (disambiguation)
- Jainagar (disambiguation)
