= Howrah–Muzaffarpur Jan Sadharan Express =

Train in India

Howrah Junction – Muzaffarpur Junction Jan Sadharan Express

Overview
- Service type: Jan Sadharan Express
- First service: 12 February 2015; 11 years ago
- Current operator: East Central Railway

Route
- Termini: Howrah (HWH); Muzaffarpur (MFP)
- Stops: 10
- Distance travelled: 549 km (341 mi)
- Average journey time: 11 hours 45 minutes
- Service frequency: Weekly
- Train number: 15271 / 15272

On-board services
- Class: General Unreserved (Deen Dayalu)
- Seating arrangements: Yes
- Sleeping arrangements: Yes
- Catering facilities: No
- Observation facilities: Large windows
- Baggage facilities: No
- Other facilities: Below the seats

Technical
- Rolling stock: LHB coach
- Track gauge: 1,676 mm (5 ft 6 in)
- Operating speed: 47 km/h (29 mph) average including halts.
Route map
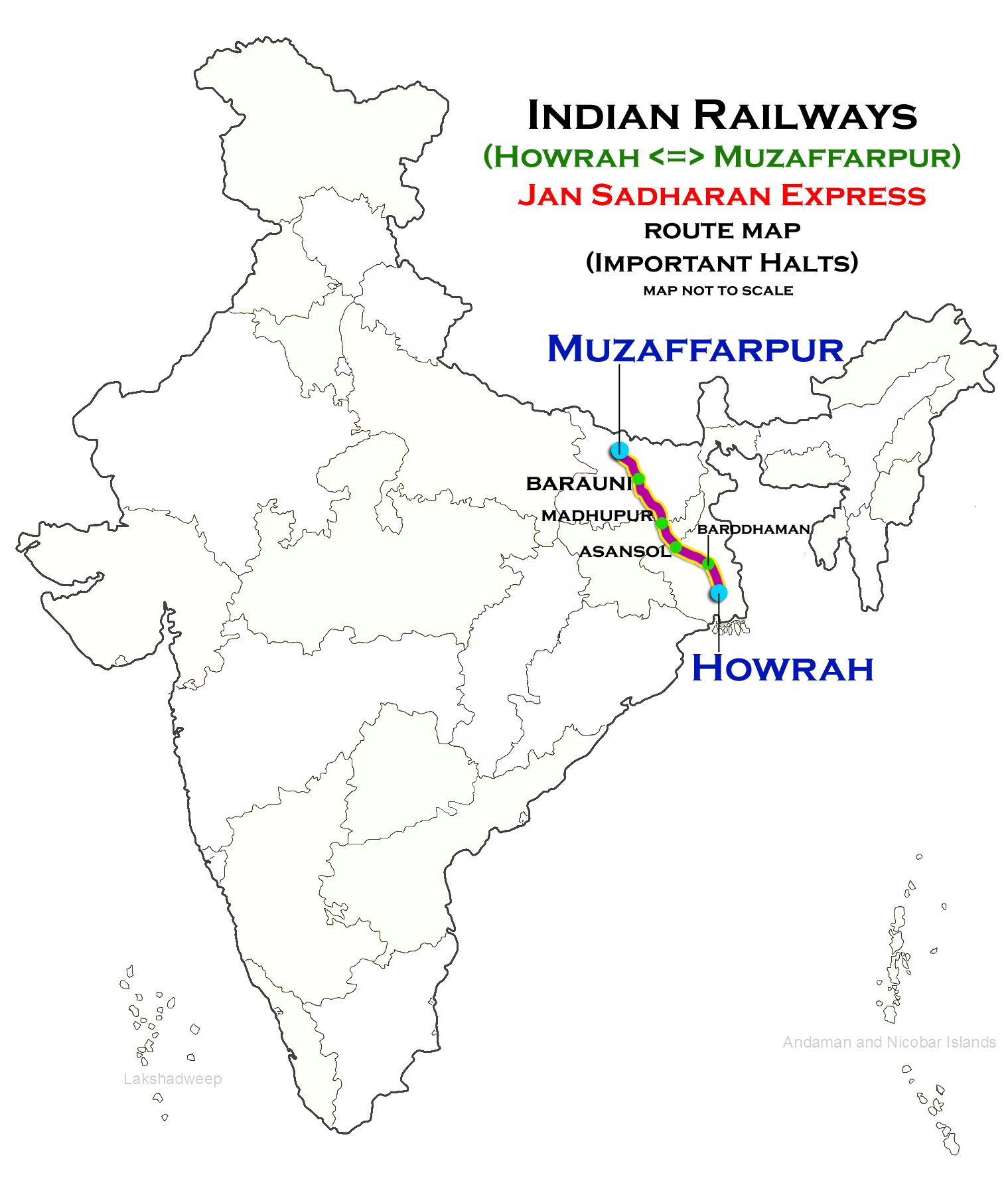

The Howrah–Muzaffarpur Jan Sadharan Express (15271/15272) is an express train operated by Indian Railways that runs between Howrah Junction in West Bengal and Muzaffarpur Junction in Bihar. Covering a distance of approximately 547 km.

== Schedule ==
15272 / 15271 Muzaffarpur–Howrah Jansadharan Express Schedule
Train Type	Jansadharan Express
Distance	547 km (15272) / 547 km (15271)
Average Speed	~43 km/h
Journey Time (MFP → HWH)	~12 hrs 25 min
Journey Time (HWH → MFP)	~12 hrs 00 min
Classes Available	SL
Operating Days	Daily
Operator	East Central Railway

== Route and halts ==
15272 Muzaffarpur–Howrah Jansadharan Express and 15271 Howrah–Muzaffarpur Jansadharan Express Schedule
Sr.	15272 MFP–HWH				15271 HWH–MFP			
Sr.	Station	Day	Arr.	Dep.	Station	Day	Arr.	Dep.
1	Muzaffarpur Junction	1	—	14:40	Howrah Junction	1	—	11:15
2	Samastipur Junction	1	16:10	16:15	Bardhaman	1	12:08	12:10
3	Barauni Junction	1	17:40	17:50	Durgapur	1	13:04	13:06
4	Jhajha	1	20:15	20:20	Raniganj	1	13:21	13:23
5	Jasidih Junction	1	20:55	21:00	Asansol Junction	1	13:49	13:59
6	Madhupur Junction	1	21:24	21:29	Chittaranjan	1	14:23	14:25
7	Chittaranjan	1	22:15	22:17	Madhupur Junction	1	15:01	15:06
8	Asansol Junction	1	22:48	22:58	Jasidih Junction	1	15:25	15:30
9	Raniganj	1	23:14	23:16	Jhajha	1	17:05	17:10
10	Durgapur	1	23:32	23:34	Barauni Junction	1	20:30	20:40
11	Bardhaman	2	00:59	01:01	Samastipur Junction	1	21:50	21:55
12	Howrah Junction	2	03:05	—	Muzaffarpur Junction	1	23:15	—

== Coach composition ==
Category	Coaches	Total
Sleeper cum Luggage Rake (SLRD)	SLRD1, SLRD2	2
General Unreserved (GEN)	GEN1, GEN2, GEN3, GEN4, GEN5, GEN6, GEN7, GEN8, GEN9, GEN10, GEN11, GEN12, GEN13, GEN14, GEN15, GEN16, GEN17, GEN18, GEN19, GEN20, GEN21	21
Luggage/Parcel Rake (LPR)	LPR1	1
Total Coaches		24

- Primary Maintenance - Muzaffarpur Coaching Depot

== Rake sharing ==
RSA with Muzaffarpur – Sabarmati Jan Sadharan Express.

== Traction ==
even route is fully electrified it hauled by Gooty-based WDP-4D or WAP-4 end to end
