= Saharsa–Anand Vihar Terminal Jan Sadharan Express =

Train in India

Saharsa Junction – Anand Vihar Terminal Jan Sadharan Express

Overview
- Service type: Jan Sadharan Express
- First service: 6 January 2015; 11 years ago
- Current operator: East Central Railways

Route
- Termini: Saharsa Junction (SHC); Anand Vihar Terminal (ANVT)
- Stops: 23
- Distance travelled: 1,254 km (779 mi)
- Average journey time: 27 hours 22 mins
- Service frequency: Weekly
- Train number: 15529 / 15530

On-board services
- Class: General Unreserved
- Seating arrangements: Yes
- Sleeping arrangements: Yes
- Catering facilities: No
- Observation facilities: Large windows

Technical
- Rolling stock: LHB coach
- Track gauge: 1,676 mm (5 ft 6 in)
- Operating speed: 47 km/h (29 mph) average including halts
- Rake sharing: 15531/15532 Saharsa–Amritsar Jan Sadharan Express (via Chandigarh)
Route map
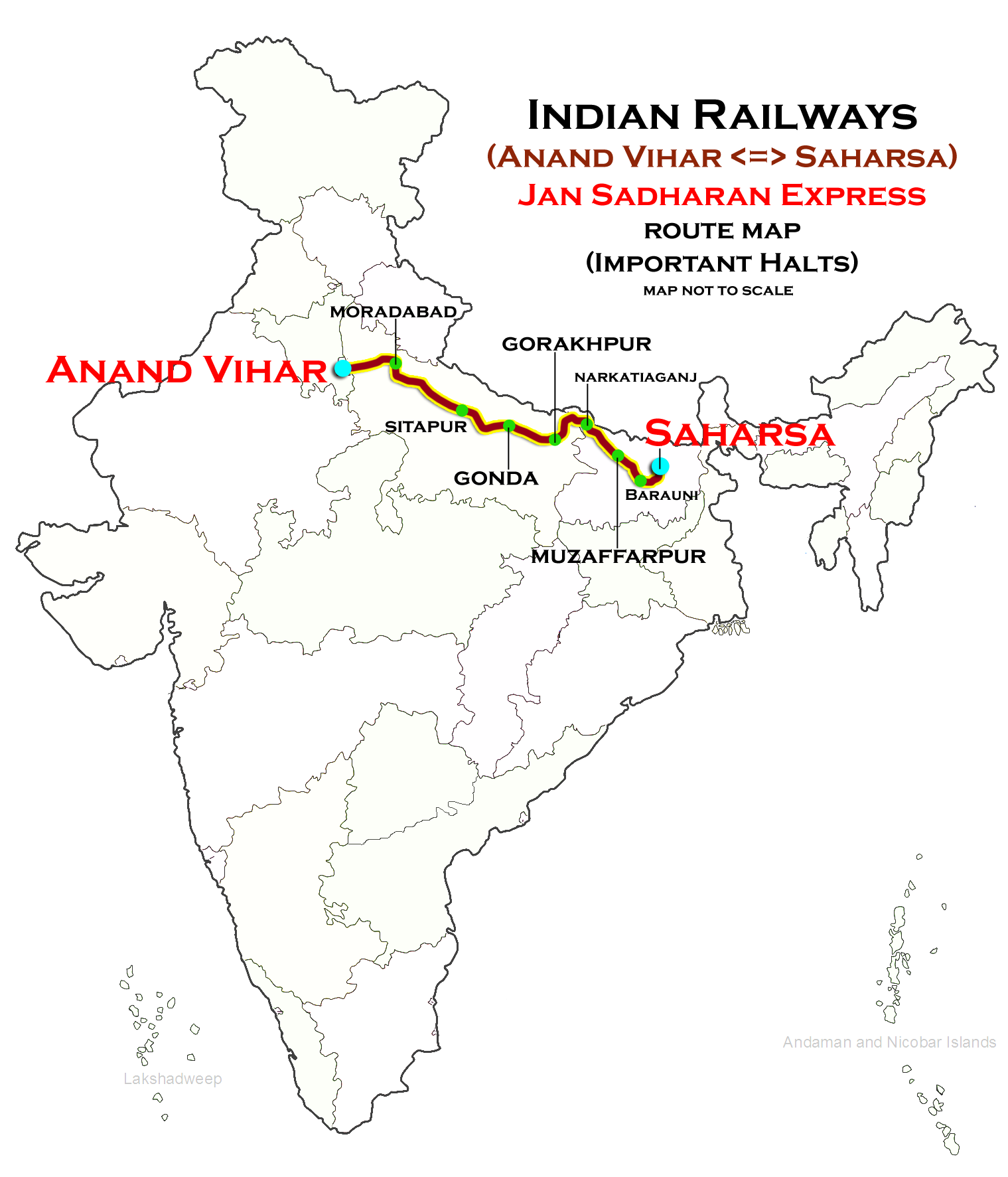

The 15529 / 15530 Saharsa–Anand Vihar Terminal Jan Sadharan Express is an Express train belonging to Indian Railways East Central Railway zone that runs between Saharsa Junction and Anand Vihar Terminal in India.

It operates as train number 15529 from Saharsa Junction to Anand Vihar Terminal and as train number 15530 in the reverse direction, serving the states of Bihar, Uttar Pradesh, & Delhi.

== Coaches ==
The 15529 / 30 Saharsa Junction–Anand Vihar Terminal Jan Sadharan Express has 16 general unreserved & two SLR (seating with luggage rake) coaches . It does not carry a pantry car.

As is customary with most train services in India, coach composition may be amended at the discretion of Indian Railways depending on demand.

== Service ==
The 15529 Saharsa Junction–Anand Vihar Terminal Jan Sadharan Express covers the distance of 1,254 km (779 mi) in 26 hours 45 mins (47 km/h) and in 27 hours 20 mins as the 15530 Anand Vihar Terminal–Saharsa Junction Jan Sadharan Express (46 km/h).

As the average speed of the train is lower than 55 km/h (34 mph), its fare doesn't include a Superfast surcharge per railway rules.

== Routing ==
The 15529 / 15530 Saharsa–Anand Vihar Terminal Jan Sadharan Express runs from Saharsa Junction via Khagaria Junction, Barauni Junction, Samastipur, Muzaffarpur Junction, Bapudham Motihari, Bettiah, Narkatiaganj, Kaptanganj Junction, Gorakhpur Junction, Basti, Gonda Junction, Sitapur, Moradabad, Ghaziabad to Anand Vihar Terminal.

== Traction ==
As the route is now fully electrified, a Ghaziabad-based WAP-7 or WAP-5 locomotive pulls the train to its destination.
