= Gorakhpur–Mumbai Antyodaya Express =

Train in India

Gorakhpur Junction – Mumbai CSMT Antyodaya Express

Overview
- Service type: Antyodaya Express
- First service: 10 February 2015; 10 years ago
- Current operator: Northern Eastern Railways

Route
- Termini: Gorakhpur Junction (GKP); Chhatrapati Shivaji Maharaj Terminus (CSMT)
- Stops: 11
- Distance travelled: 1,699 km (1,056 mi)
- Average journey time: 28 hours
- Service frequency: Weekly
- Train number: 12597 / 12598

On-board services
- Class: UR/GEN'
- Seating arrangements: Yes
- Sleeping arrangements: Yes
- Catering facilities: No

Technical
- Rolling stock: LHB-Antyodaya
- Track gauge: 1,676 mm (5 ft 6 in)
- Operating speed: 54 km/h (34 mph)
Route map
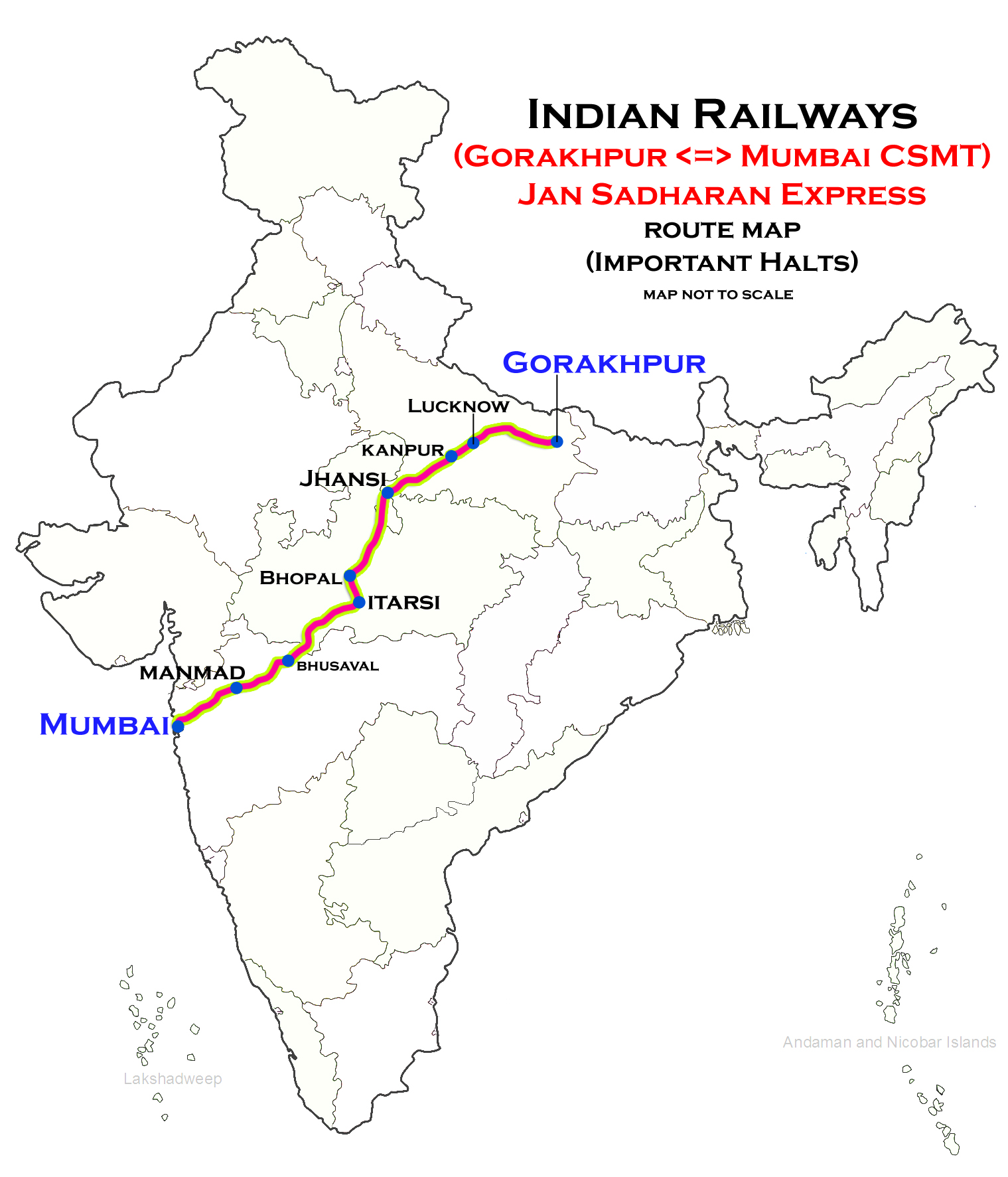

Gorakhpur Mumbai Antyodaya Express is a weekly train which runs as train number 12597 from Gorakhpur Junction to Mumbai CSMT and as train number 12598 from Mumbai CSMT to Gorakhpur Junction. This train is operated by North Eastern Railway zone of Indian Railways. It runs at an average speed of 60 km/h in both directions, covering in 27 hours.

Till 22 April 2019, it was run as the Jan Sadharan Express with ICF coach and later 23 April 2019 it's upgraded to LHB coach and runs as the Antyodaya Express.

== Coaches ==
This train has 17 General Second class coaches and 2 luggage cars. Coaches can be increased or decreased to meet demand.

== Service ==
The 12597 Gorakhpur Junction–Mumbai CSMT Antyodaya Express covers the distance of 1,699 km (1,056 mi) in 27 hours 50 mins (61 km/h) and in 29 hours 05 mins as the 12598 Mumbai CSMT–Gorakhpur Junction Antyodaya Express (60 km/h).

As the average speed of the train is lower than 55 km/h (34 mph), as per railway rules, its fare doesn't includes a Superfast surcharge due to unreserved coaches.

== Traction ==
Both trains are hauled by a Bhusawal Electric Loco Shed-based WAP-4 locomotive on its entire journey.

== Routing ==
This train runs via Khalilabad, Basti, Gonda Junction, Lucknow, Kanpur Central, Orai, Jhansi Junction, Bhopal Junction, Itarsi Junction, Bhusaval Junction, Kalyan Junction to reach Mumbai CSMT and vice versa.

== Timing ==
- 12597 – Leaves Gorakhpur Junction every Tuesday at morning 8:30 hrs IST and reaches Mumbai CSMT on 2nd day at afternoon 12:20 hrs.
- 12598 – Leaves Mumbai CSMT every Wednesday at 13:30 hrs IST and reaches Gorakhpur Junction 2nd day at 18:35 hrs IST
