= Muzaffarpur – Sabarmati Jan Sadharan Express =

Train in India

Muzaffarpur Junction – Ahmedabad Junction Jan Sadharan Express
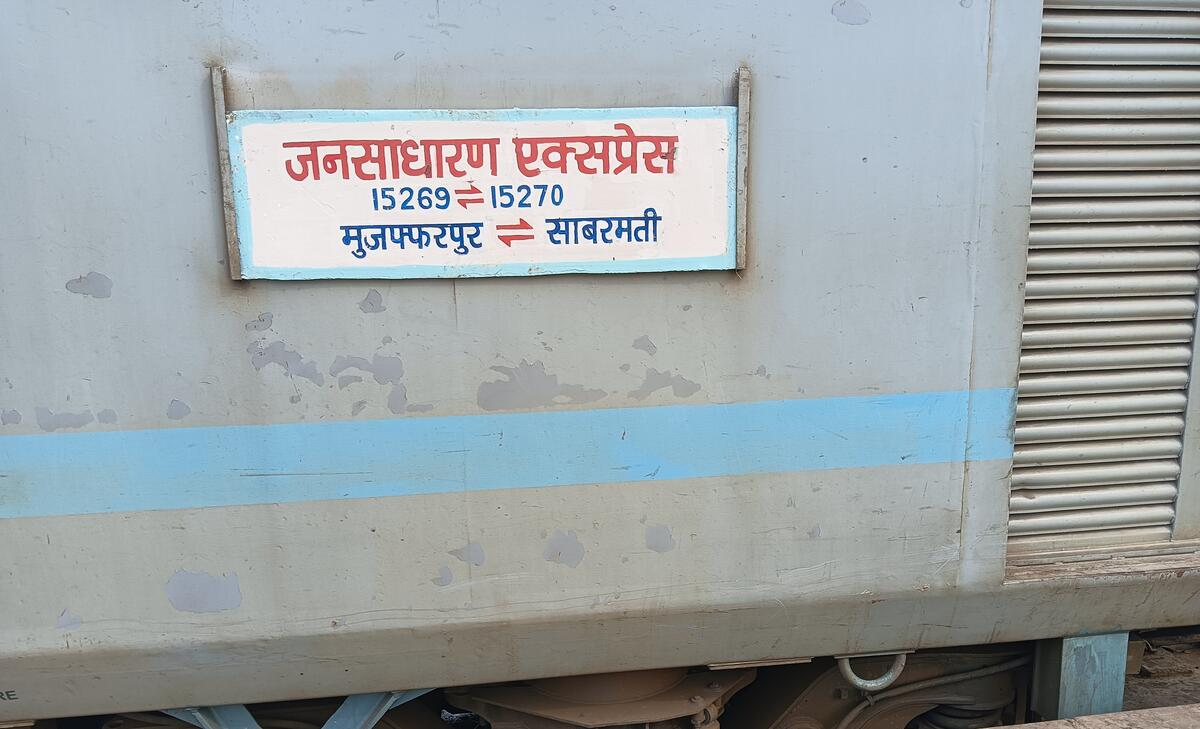
- Train Board

Overview
- Service type: Jan Sadharan Express
- Locale: Bihar, Uttar Pradesh, Rajasthan & Gujarat
- Current operator: East Central Railway

Route
- Termini: Muzaffarpur Junction (MFP); Ahmedabad Junction (ADI)
- Stops: 17
- Distance travelled: 1,756 km (1,091 mi)
- Average journey time: 36 hours
- Service frequency: Weekly
- Train number: 15269 / 15270

On-board services
- Class: General Unreserved
- Seating arrangements: Yes
- Sleeping arrangements: Yes
- Catering facilities: Available
- Observation facilities: Large windows
- Baggage facilities: No
- Other facilities: Below the seats

Technical
- Rolling stock: LHB coach
- Track gauge: 1,676 mm (5 ft 6 in)
- Operating speed: 49 km/h (30 mph) average including halts.

The 15269 / 15270 Muzaffarpur–Ahmedabad Jan Sadharan Express is a Jan Sadharan Express train belonging to Indian Railways East Central Railway zone that runs between Muzaffarpur Junction and Ahmedabad Junction in India.

It operates as train number 15269 from Muzaffarpur Junction to Ahmedabad Junction and as train number 15270 in the reverse direction, serving the states of Bihar, Uttar Pradesh, Rajasthan & Gujarat.

== Coaches ==
The 15269 / 70 Muzaffarpur Junction–Ahmedabad Junction Jan Sadharan Express has 21 general unreserved & two SLR (seating with luggage rake) coaches . It does not carry a pantry car.

As is customary with most train services in India, coach composition may be amended at the discretion of Indian Railways depending on demand.

== Train details ==
| Attribute | 15269 MFP–SBIB Jansadharan Express | 15270 SBIB–MFP Jansadharan Express |
|---|---|---|
| Type | Mail / Express | Mail / Express |
| Run days | Thursday | Saturday |
| Travel time | 33 hours 25 minutes | 33 hours 40 minutes |
| Distance | 1750 km | 1751 km |
| Class | Unreserved | Unreserved |
| Season Ticket (MST) | Allowed | Not Allowed |

== Route and halts ==
15269 Muzaffarpur–Sabarmati Jansadharan Express and 15270 Sabarmati–Muzaffarpur Jansadharan Express Schedule
| Sr. | 15269 MFP–SBIB | | | | 15270 SBIB–MFP | | | |
| Sr. | Station | Day | Arr. | Dep. | Station | Day | Arr. | Dep. |
|---|---|---|---|---|---|---|---|---|
| 1 | Muzaffarpur Junction | 1 | — | 21:20 | Sabarmati BG | 1 | — | 17:55 |
| 2 | Hajipur Junction | 1 | 22:10 | 22:15 | Kalol | 1 | 18:14 | 18:16 |
| 3 | Sonpur Junction | 1 | 22:23 | 22:25 | Mahesana Junction | 1 | 18:47 | 18:49 |
| 4 | Chhapra | 2 | 00:15 | 00:25 | Palanpur Junction | 1 | 20:18 | 20:20 |
| 5 | Siwan Junction | 2 | 01:15 | 01:20 | Abu Road | 1 | 21:15 | 21:25 |
| 6 | Bhatni Junction | 2 | 01:58 | 02:00 | Marwar Junction | 1 | 23:47 | 23:49 |
| 7 | Deoria Sadar | 2 | 02:30 | 02:35 | Ajmer Junction | 2 | 01:55 | 02:05 |
| 8 | Gorakhpur Junction | 2 | 04:10 | 04:20 | Phulera | 2 | 03:06 | 03:08 |
| 9 | Khalilabad | 2 | 04:54 | 04:56 | Jaipur Junction | 2 | 04:00 | 04:10 |
| 10 | Basti | 2 | 05:19 | 05:22 | Bharatpur Junction | 2 | 08:30 | 08:35 |
| 11 | Gonda Junction | 2 | 06:50 | 07:00 | Achhnera Junction | 2 | 08:55 | 08:57 |
| 12 | Lucknow Junction | 2 | 10:30 | 10:40 | Idgah Junction | 2 | 09:35 | 09:40 |
| 13 | Kanpur Central | 2 | 12:50 | 12:55 | Tundla Junction | 2 | 10:40 | 10:45 |
| 14 | Tundla Junction | 2 | 15:40 | 15:45 | Kanpur Central | 2 | 14:00 | 14:10 |
| 15 | Idgah Junction | 2 | 16:50 | 16:55 | Lucknow Junction | 2 | 15:35 | 15:45 |
| 16 | Achhnera Junction | 2 | 17:16 | 17:18 | Gonda Junction | 2 | 17:45 | 17:50 |
| 17 | Bharatpur Junction | 2 | 17:45 | 17:50 | Basti | 2 | 19:04 | 19:07 |
| 18 | Jaipur Junction | 2 | 21:10 | 21:20 | Khalilabad | 2 | 19:29 | 19:31 |
| 19 | Phulera | 2 | 22:05 | 22:07 | Gorakhpur Junction | 2 | 20:45 | 20:55 |
| 20 | Ajmer Junction | 2 | 23:20 | 23:30 | Deoria Sadar | 2 | 21:50 | 21:55 |
| 21 | Marwar Junction | 3 | 01:10 | 01:15 | Bhatni Junction | 2 | 22:13 | 22:15 |
| 22 | Abu Road | 3 | 03:20 | 03:30 | Siwan Junction | 2 | 22:55 | 23:00 |
| 23 | Palanpur Junction | 3 | 04:20 | 04:22 | Chhapra | 3 | 00:40 | 00:50 |
| 24 | Mahesana Junction | 3 | 05:13 | 05:15 | Sonpur Junction | 3 | 01:51 | 01:53 |
| 25 | Kalol | 3 | 05:54 | 05:56 | Hajipur Junction | 3 | 02:05 | 02:10 |
| 26 | Sabarmati BG | 3 | 07:25 | — | Muzaffarpur Junction | 3 | 03:50 | — |

== Schedule ==
15269 / 15270 Muzaffarpur–Sabarmati Jansadharan Express Schedule
| Train Type | Jansadharan Express |
| Distance | 1751 km (15269) / 1751 km (15270) |
| Average Speed | ~44 km/h |
| Journey Time (MFP → SBIB) | ~33 hrs 45 min |
| Journey Time (SBIB → MFP) | ~33 hrs 55 min |
| Classes Available | SL, GN |
| Operating Days | Weekly |
| Operator | East Central Railway |

== Rakes ==
The 15269 / 15270 Muzaffarpur–Sabarmati Jansadharan Express has a total of 22 coaches. As this is a Jansadharan Express, all coaches are unreserved.

| Coach type | Number of coaches |
|---|---|
| General Unreserved | 20 |
| SLRD (Seating cum Luggage Rake for Disabled) | 2 |
| Total | 22 |

The primary maintenance of this train is carried out at the Muzaffarpur Junction Coaching Depot, and it shares its rake with the Howrah–Muzaffarpur Jan Sadharan Express

== Traction ==
As the route is now fully electrified, a Howrah Loco Shed-based WAP-7 or WAP-5 electric locomotive pulls the train for its entire journey.

== See also ==
- Howrah–Muzaffarpur Jan Sadharan Express
- Muzaffarpur
