= Saharsa–Amritsar Jan Sadharan Express (via Sirhind) =

Express Train of Northern Railway Zone in India

Saharsa Junction – Amritsar Junction Jan Sadharan Express (via Sirhind)
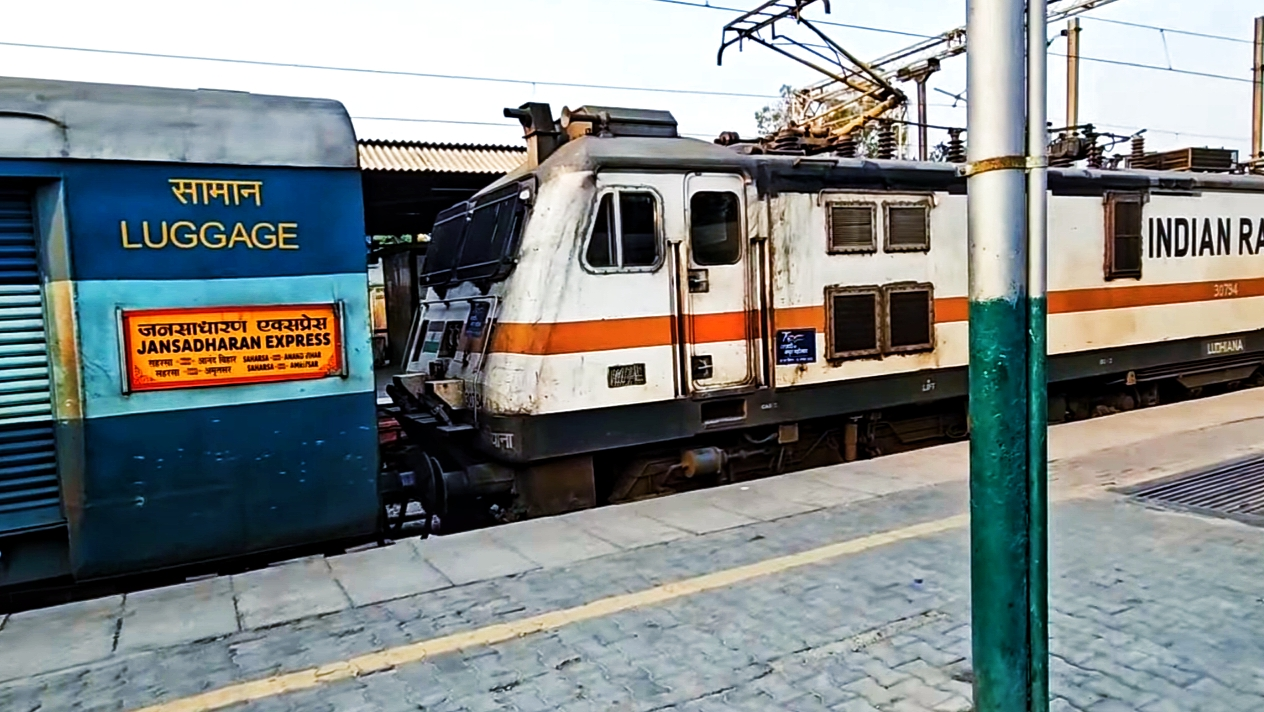
- Ludhiana WAP-7 Hauling Jan Sadharan Express At Jalandhar Cantt

Overview
- Service type: Jan Sadharan Express
- Locale: Bihar, Uttar Pradesh, Haryana & Punjab
- Current operator: Northern Railways

Route
- Termini: Saharsa Junction (SHC); Amritsar Junction (ASR)
- Stops: 32
- Distance travelled: 1,568 km (974 mi)
- Average journey time: 34h 30m
- Service frequency: Weekly (Note: Runs one day in a week for every direction.)
- Train number: 14603 / 14604

On-board services
- Classes: AC 2 tier, AC 3 tier, Sleeper class, General Unreserved (Deen Dayalu)
- Seating arrangements: No
- Sleeping arrangements: Yes
- Catering facilities: No
- Observation facilities: Large windows
- Other facilities: Below the seats

Technical
- Rolling stock: LHB coach
- Track gauge: 1,676 mm (5 ft 6 in)
- Operating speed: 46 km/h (29 mph) average including halts
Route map
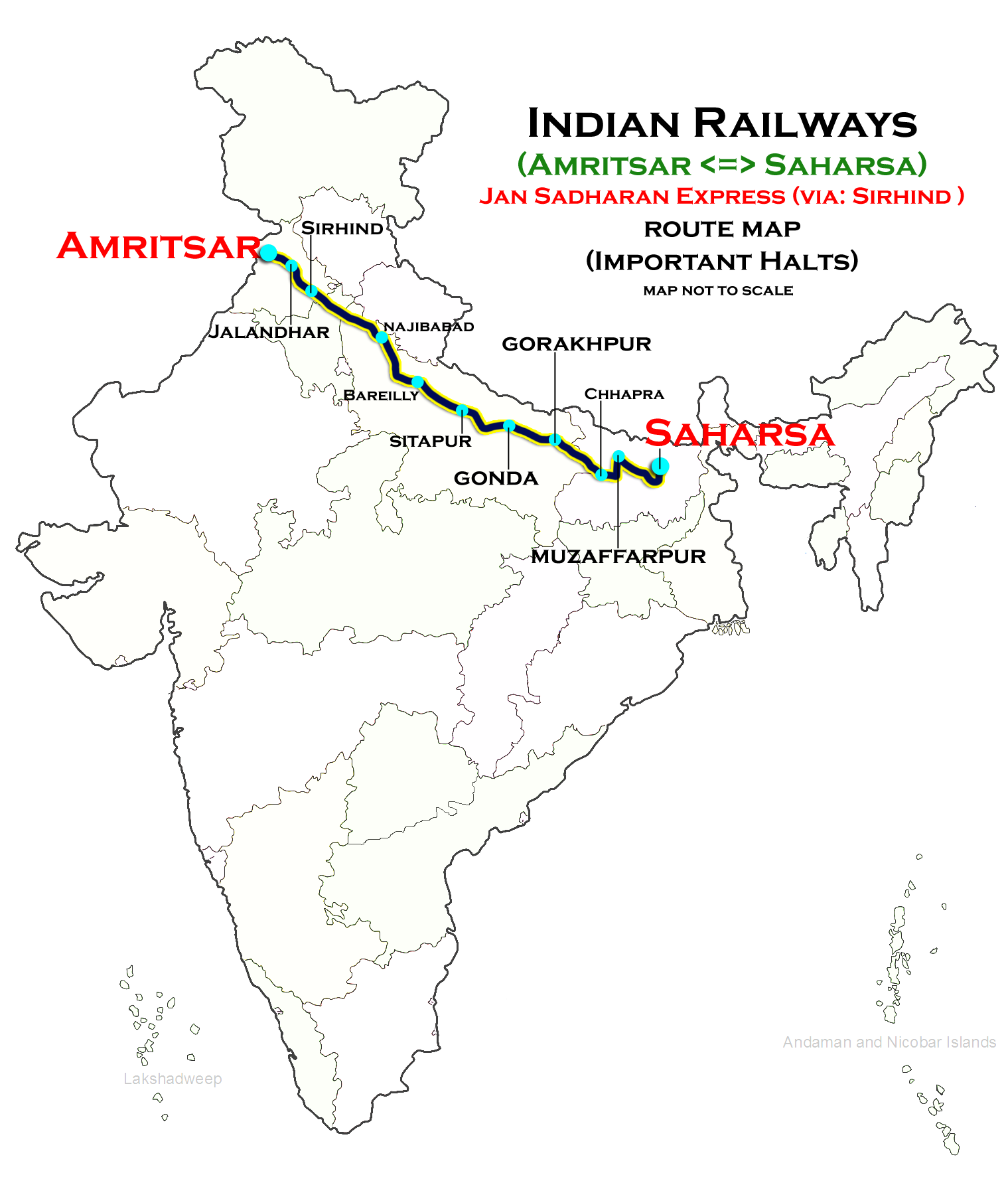

The 14603 / 14604 Saharsa–Amritsar Jan Sadharan Express is an Express train belonging to Northern Railway zone that runs between Saharsa Junction and Amritsar Junction in India. It is currently being operated with 14603/14604 train numbers on a weekly basis.

== Service ==
The 14603/Saharsa–Amritsar Jan Sadharan Express has an average speed of 45 km/h and covers 1568 km in 34h 30m. The 14604/Amritsar–Saharsa Weekly Jan Sadharan Express has an average speed of 51 km/h and covers 1568 km in 30h 50m.

== Route & halts ==
The important halts of the train are:

- Saharsa Junction
- Samastipur
- Muzaffarpur Junction
- Hajipur
- Siwan Junction
- Deoria Sadar
- Gorakhpur
- Basti
- Gonda Junction
- Sitapur
- Bareilly
- Moradabad
- Najibabad Junction
- Saharanpur
- Ambala Cantonment
- Sirhind
- Ludhiana
- Jalandhar City
- Beas Junction
- Amritsar Junction

== Coach composition ==
The train has standard Hybrid-LHB rakes with max speed of 130 kmph. The train consists of 18 coaches:

- 16 General Unreserved
- 2 Seating cum Luggage Rake

== Traction ==
Both trains are hauled by a Ghaziabad / Tughlakabad-based WAP-7 or WAP-4 so was Krishnarajapuram based WDP-4B locomotive from Saharsa Junction to Amritsar Junction and vice versa.

== Rake sharing ==
The train shares its rake with 22423/22424 Gorakhpur–Amritsar Jan Sadharan Express.

== See also ==
- Saharsa Junction railway station
- Amritsar Junction railway station
- Danapur–Anand Vihar Jan Sadharan Express
- Gorakhpur–Amritsar Jan Sadharan Express
