= Raxaul–Lokmanya Tilak Terminus Antyodaya Express =

Raxaul Junction – Mumbai Lokmanya Tilak Terminus Antyodaya Express

Overview
- Service type: Antyodaya Express
- Locale: Bihar, Uttar Pradesh, Madhya Pradesh & Maharashtra
- Current operator: East Central Railways

Route
- Termini: Raxaul Junction (RXL); Lokmanya Tilak Terminus (LTT)
- Stops: 21
- Distance travelled: 1,928 km (1,198 mi)
- Average journey time: 38 hours
- Service frequency: Weekly
- Train number: 15267 / 15268

On-board services
- Class: General Unreserved
- Seating arrangements: Yes
- Sleeping arrangements: Yes
- Catering facilities: No

Technical
- Rolling stock: LHB-Antyodaya
- Track gauge: 1,676 mm (5 ft 6 in)
- Operating speed: 50 km/h (31 mph)
Route map
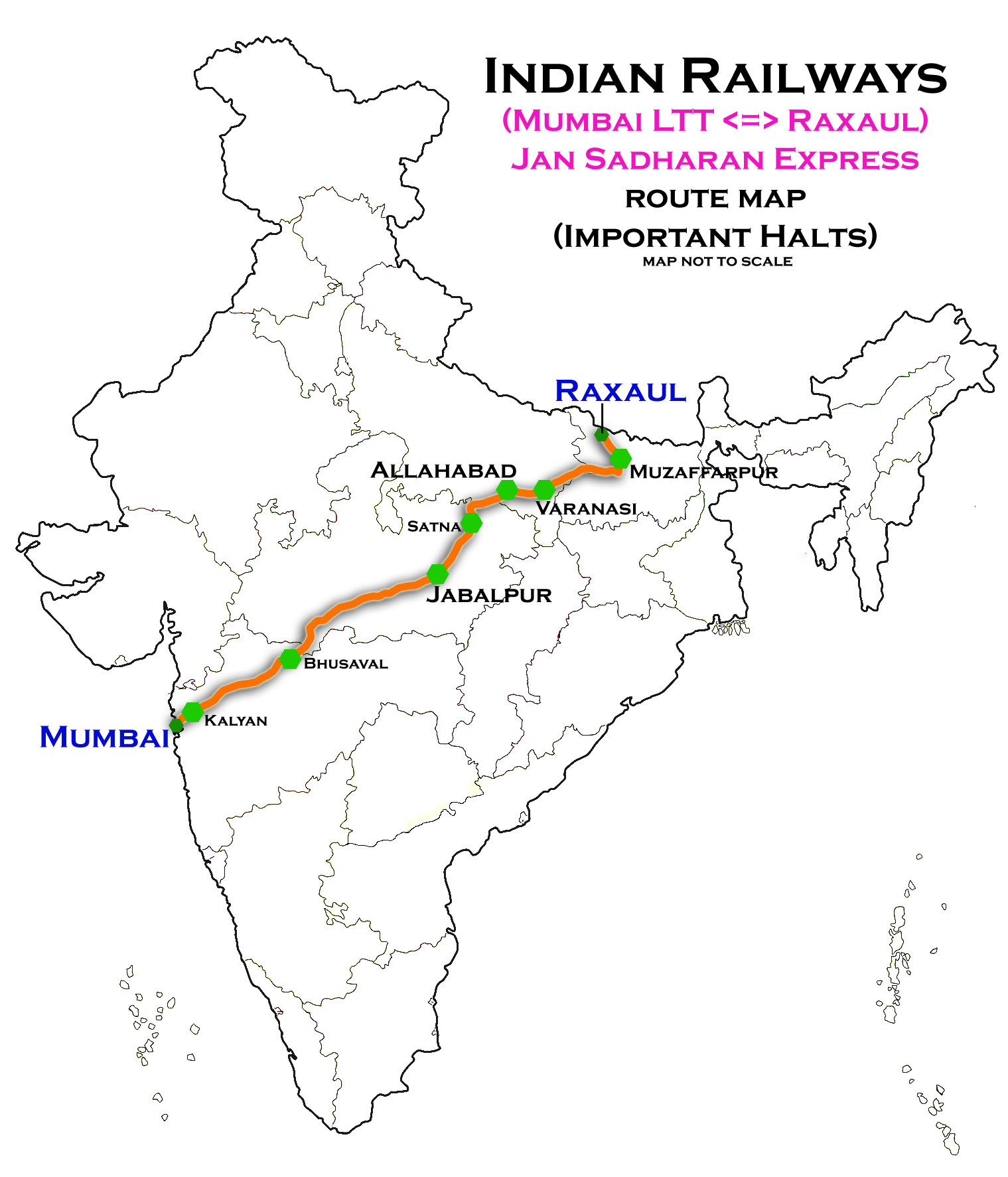

The 15267 / 15268 Raxaul–Lokmanya Tilak Terminus Antyodaya Express is an Antyodaya Express train belonging to Indian Railways East Central Zone that runs between Raxaul Junction and Lokmanya Tilak Terminus in India.

It operates as train number 15267 from Raxaul Junction to Lokmanya Tilak Terminus and as train number 15268 in the reverse direction, serving the states of Bihar, Uttar Pradesh, Madhya Pradesh, and Maharashtra.

Till 31 August 2019, it used to run as Jan Sadharan Express. After 1 September 2019, it was converted into Antyodaya Express with LHB rakes for more comfortable journey in an unreserved train.

== Coaches ==
The 15267 / 68 Raxaul Junction–Lokmanya Tilak Terminus Antyodaya Express has 23 general unreserved & two SLR (seating with luggage rake) coaches. It does not carry a pantry car.

As is customary with most train services in India, coach composition may be amended at the discretion of Indian Railways depending on demand.

== Service ==
The 15267 Raxaul Junction–Lokmanya Tilak Terminus Antyodaya Express covers the distance of 1,928 km (1,198 mi) in 37 hours 10 mins (52 km/h) and in 39 hours 50 mins as the 15268 Lokmanya Tilak Terminus–Raxaul Junction Antyodaya Express (48 km/h).

As the average speed of the train is lower than 55 km/h (34 mph), as per railway rules, its fare doesn't includes a Superfast surcharge.

== Routing ==
The 15267 / 68 Raxaul Junction–Lokmanya Tilak Terminus Antyodaya Express runs from Raxaul Junction via Muzaffarpur Junction, Chhapra Junction, Mughalsarai Junction, Allahabad Junction, Jabalpur Junction, Itarsi Junction, Bhusaval Junction, Kalyan Junction to Lokmanya Tilak Terminus.

== Traction ==
As the route is fully electrified an electric locomotive WAP-4 pulls the train to its destination.
