= Achhnera Junction railway station =

Railway station in Uttar Pradesh, India

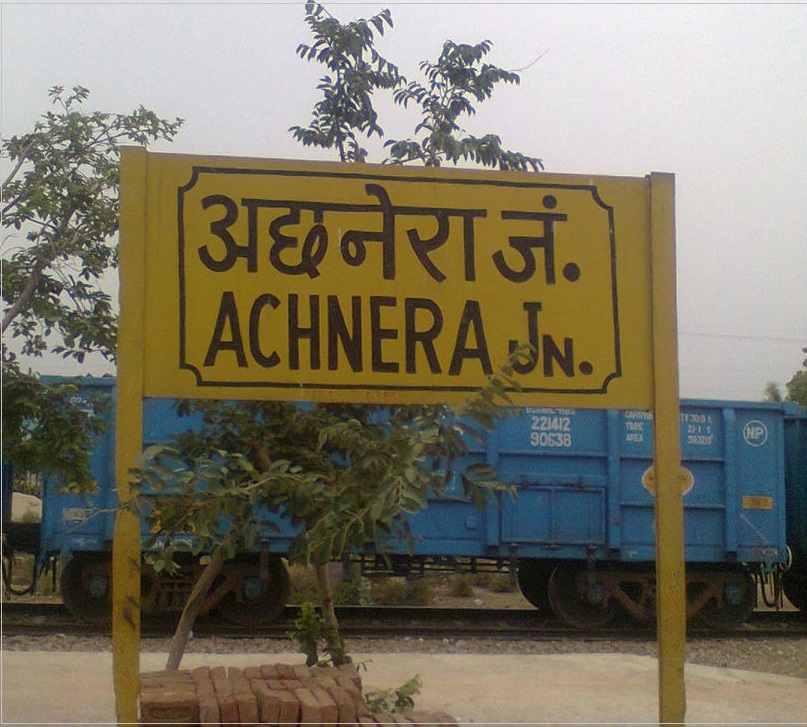

General information
- Location: Agra district, Uttar Pradesh; India
- Coordinates: 27.18°N 77.77°E
- Elevation: 167 metres (548 ft)
- Operator: North Central Railway

Construction
- Structure type: Standard (on ground station)
- Parking: Yes

Other information
- Status: Functioning
- Station code: AH
- Zone(s): North Central Railway
- Division(s): Agra
Location
- Location within India Location within Uttar Pradesh

Achhnera Junction railway station (station code AH) is a railway station located in Agra district in the Indian state of Uttar Pradesh. It has an average elevation of 167 metres (547 feet). It is reachable through Agra Jaipur Highway. The city is connected by rail to Agra, Jaipur, Kanpur and Mathura.

== Redevelopment ==
This railway station is currently being redeveloped under the Amrit Bharat Stations Scheme.

== Trains ==
- Marudhar Express (via Faizabad)
- Muzaffarpur–Ahmedabad Jan Sadharan Express
- Barmer–Guwahati Express
- Ghy Bme Bkn Express
- Khajuraho–Udaipur City Express
- Kavi Guru Express
- Udaipur City–Kamakhya Kavi Guru Express
- Bikaner–Guwahati Express
- Agra Fort–Ajmer Intercity Express
- Udaipur City–Patliputra Humsafar Express
- Gomti Nagar jaipur express
- BDTS - GKP Antyodaya Express

== See also ==
- Northern Railway zone
