= Jayanagar =

Jayanagar may refer to:

- Jayanagar, Bihar, a town of the Madhubani district in the Indian state of Bihar.
- Jayanagar, Bangalore, a neighbourhood of the Bangalore district in the Indian state of Karnataka.
  - Jayanagar metro station, a metro station of the Bangalore district in the Indian state of Karnataka.
  - Jayanagar (Vidhana Sabha constituency), a legislative assembly constituency of the Bangalore district in the Indian state of Karnataka.
  - National College, Jayanagar, a college of the Bangalore district in the Indian state of Karnataka.
- Jayanagar, Mysore, a neighbourhood of the Mysore district in the Indian state of Karnataka.
- Jayanagar, Kapilvastu, a town of the Kapilvastu district in the Nepal
- Jayanagar, Rautahat, a town of the Rautahat district in the Nepal
- Jayanegara, 14th-century emperor of Majapahit

== See also ==
- Jaynagar (disambiguation)
- Jainagar (disambiguation)
