= Saharsa–Amritsar Jan Sadharan Express (via Chandigarh) =

Train in India

Saharsa Junction – Amritsar Junction Jan Sadharan Express (via Chandigarh)

Overview
- Service type: Jan Sadharan Express
- First service: 11 January 2015; 11 years ago
- Current operator: East Central Railways

Route
- Termini: Saharsa Junction (SHC); Amritsar Junction (ASR)
- Stops: 27
- Distance travelled: 1,612 km (1,002 mi)
- Average journey time: 27 hours 22 mins
- Service frequency: Weekly
- Train number: 15531 / 15532

On-board services
- Class: General Unreserved
- Seating arrangements: Yes
- Sleeping arrangements: Yes
- Catering facilities: No
- Observation facilities: Large windows

Technical
- Rolling stock: LHB coach
- Track gauge: 1,676 mm (5 ft 6 in)
- Operating speed: 46 km/h (29 mph) average including halts
- Rake sharing: 15529/15530 Saharsa–Anand Vihar Terminal Jan Sadharan Express
Route map
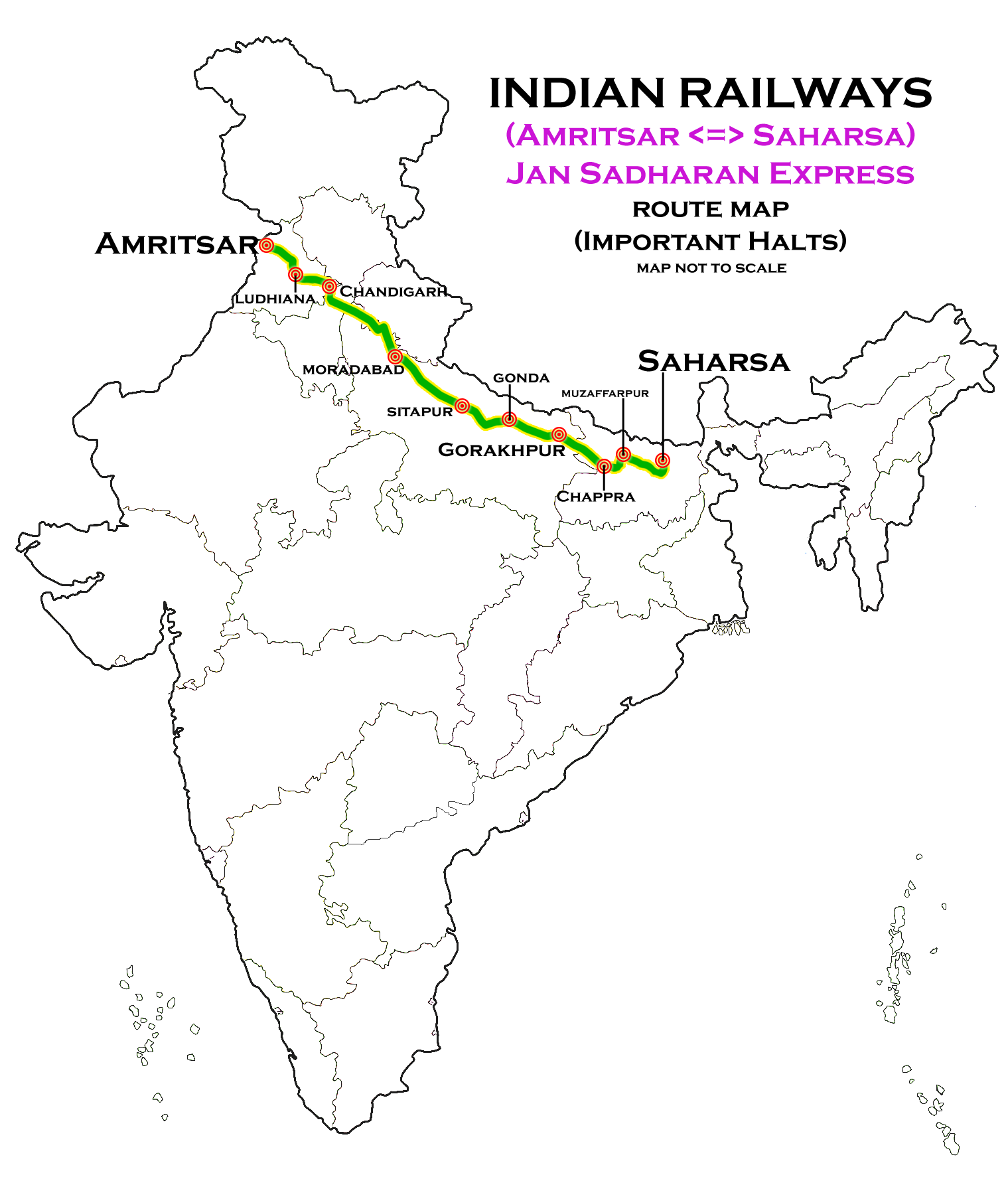

The 15531 / 15532 Saharsa–Amritsar Jan Sadharan Express is an Express train belonging to Indian Railways East Central Railway zone that runs between Saharsa Junction and Amritsar Junction in India.

It operates as train number 15531 from Saharsa Junction to Amritsar Junction and as train number 15532 in the reverse direction, serving the states of Bihar, Uttar Pradesh, Uttarakhand, Haryana, Chandigarh & Punjab.

== Coaches ==
The 15531 / 32 Saharsa Junction–Amritsar Junction Jan Sadharan Express has 16 general unreserved & two SLR (seating with luggage rake) coaches . It does not carry a pantry car.

As is customary with most train services in India, coach composition may be amended at the discretion of Indian Railways depending on demand.

== Service ==
The 15531 Saharsa Junction–Amritsar Junction Jan Sadharan Express covers the distance of 1,612 km (1,002 mi) in 36 hours 00 mins (45 km/h) and in 34 hours 05 mins as the 15532 Amritsar Junction – Saharsa Junction Jan Sadharan Express (46 km/h).

As the average speed of the train is lower than 55 km/h (34 mph), as per railway rules, its fare doesn't includes a Superfast surcharge.

== Routing ==
The 15531/15532 Saharsa–Amritsar Jan Sadharan Express runs from Saharsa Junction via Khagaria Junction, Samastipur, Muzaffarpur Junction, Hajipur, Chhapra Junction, Siwan Junction, Deoria Sadar, Gorakhpur, Gonda Junction, Sitapur, Moradabad, Laksar Junction, Saharanpur, Ambala Cantonment, Chandigarh Junction, Ludhiana, Jalandhar City, Beas Junction to Amritsar Junction.

== Traction ==
As the route is now fully electrified, a Tughlakabad-based WAP-7 or WAP-4 electric locomotive and Golden Rock-based WDP-4 pulls the train to its destination.
