= Tilhar railway station =

Railway station in Uttar Pradesh, India

General information
- Location: Tilhar, Uttar Pradesh 242307; India
- Coordinates: 27°58′21.44″N 79°44′31.72″E
- Grid position: 1st
- Operated by: Northern Railway zone of the Indian Railways
- Platforms: 3
- Tracks: 6
- Bus routes: Lucknow-dehli NH24, Tilhar Baduan Highway, Tilhar Nigohi Highway Behind from Station.
- Bus stands: Tilhar Bus Station

Construction
- Structure type: Standard
- Parking: Yes

Other information
- Station code: TLH

History
- Opening: 1900
Location

Tilhar railway station (station code: TLH) is a railway station on the Lucknow–Moradabad line located in the City of Tilhar in, Uttar Pradesh, India. Since 1900, British government For Tehsil Tilhar Use It is under the administrative control of the Moradabad Division of the Northern Railway Zone of the Indian Railways, and was formerly part of the Oudh and Rohilkhand Railway. In 2017, passengers claiming they had a right to travel for free stopped a train at Tilhar.
