= Jainagar, Maharashtra =

Village in Maharashtra

Jainagar
- Village
- Interactive map of Jainagar
- Country: India
- State: Maharashtra

Jainagar is a village in Maharashtra state, Nandurbar district, of India with pin code 425423. The village is home to the Heramb Ganesh Temple.
