= Jai Nagarkatti =

American chemist and businessman

Jai P. Nagarkatti (February 18, 1947, in Hyderabad, India – November 13, 2010, in Saint Louis, Missouri) was an American chemist and businessman who served as the chairman, chief operating officer, CEO, and president of Sigma Aldrich.

Nagarkatti earned a master's degree in organic chemistry from Osmania University. Nagarkatti joined Sigma-Aldrich in 1976, after graduating from Texas A&M University–Commerce, and worked there for the rest of his career. In 2004, he became company president and chief operating officer; in 2005 he joined the board of directors, followed by becoming CEO in 2006 and chairman of the board in 2009.

In 2004, he also finished the advanced Management Program at Harvard Business School. In 2007, he was elected to the Board of Trustees at Washington University in St. Louis. He also served on the Board for the Missouri Botanical Garden and the Saint Louis Science Center.

The Reading Garden at Samuel C. Sachs Branch of St. Louis County Library in Chesterfield, MO which opened in 2015 was named “Jai Nagarkatti Monsanto Company Reading Garden”, in honor of Mr. Nagarkatti.
