= Jaynagar–Lokmanya Tilak Terminus Antyodaya Express =

Train in India

Jaynagar – Mumbai Lokmanya Tilak Terminus Antyodaya Express

Overview
- Service type: Antyodaya Express
- First service: 12 August 2018; 7 years ago
- Last service: 1 December 2020; 5 years ago
- Current operator: East Central Railways

Route
- Termini: Jaynagar (JYG); Lokmanya Tilak Terminus (LTT)
- Stops: 17
- Distance travelled: 1,958 km (1,217 mi)
- Average journey time: 36 hours 55 mins
- Service frequency: Weekly
- Train number: 15547 / 15548

On-board services
- Class: General Unreserved
- Seating arrangements: Yes
- Sleeping arrangements: Yes
- Catering facilities: No

Technical
- Rolling stock: LHB-Antyodaya
- Track gauge: 1,676 mm (5 ft 6 in)
- Operating speed: 53.5 km/h (33 mph)
Route map
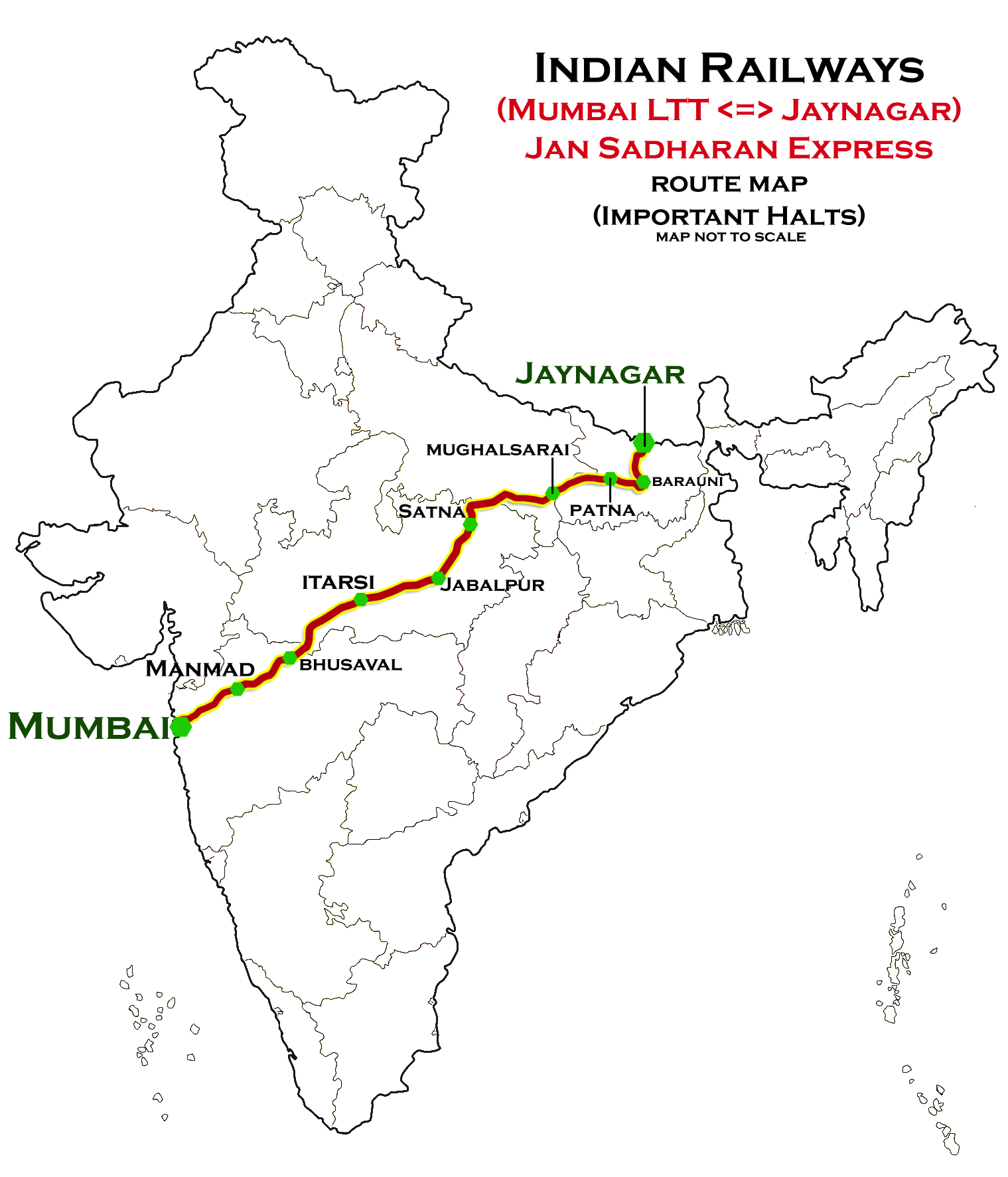

The 15547 / 15548 Jaynagar–Lokmanya Tilak Terminus Antyodaya Express is an Express train belonging to Indian Railways East Central Railway zone that runs between Jaynagar and Lokmanya Tilak Terminus in India.

It operates as train number 15547 from Jaynagar to Lokmanya Tilak Terminus and as train number 15548 in the reverse direction, serving the states of Bihar, Uttar Pradesh, Madhya Pradesh & Maharashtra.

Till 23 September 2018, it was run as the Jan Sadharan Express with ICF coach and later 24 September 2018 it's upgraded to LHB coach and runs as the Antyodaya Express.

The train was discontinued after the extension of Pawan Express to Jaynagar on December 1, 2020.

== Coaches ==
The 15547 / 48 Jaynagar–Lokmanya Tilak Terminus Antyodaya Express has 17 general unreserved & two SLR (seating with luggage rake) coaches. It does not carry a pantry car.

As is customary with most train services in India, coach composition may be amended at the discretion of Indian Railways depending on demand.

== Service ==
The 15547 Jaynagar–Lokmanya Tilak Terminus Antyodaya Express covers the distance of 1,958 km (1,217 mi) in 37 hours 10 mins (53 km/h) and in 36 hours 00 mins as the 15548 Lokmanya Tilak Terminus–Jaynagar Antyodaya Express (54 km/h).

As the average speed of the train is lower than 55 km/h (34 mph), as per railway rules, its fare doesn't include a Superfast surcharge.

== Routing ==
The 15547 / 48 Jaynagar–Lokmanya Tilak Terminus Antyodaya Express runs from Jaynaga} via Samastipur Junction, Patna Junction, Mughalsarai Junction, Allahabad Junction, Jabalpur Junction, Itarsi Junction, Bhusaval Junction, Kalyan Junction to Lokmanya Tilak Terminus.

== Traction ==
As the route is fully electrified an electric locomotive WAP-4 pulls the train to its destination.
