= Sherwadeeh =

- Village
- Location in Uttar Pradesh, India Sherwadeeh (India)
- Coordinates: 26.847462°N 82.405227°E
- Country: India
- State: Uttar Pradesh
- District: Basti
- Panchayat: Harraiya

Population (2022)
  - Total: 1,172

Languages
  - Official: Hindi & awadhi
- Time zone: UTC+5:30 (IST)
- PIN: 272130
- Telephone code: 05546
- Vehicle registration: UP 51
- Website: up.gov.in

Sherwadeeh is a village in Basti district, Tehsil Harraiya, state Uttar Pradesh, India. Sherwadeeh has a Census of India Village-code 179839,

== Geography ==
Sherwadeeh is located at 26.847462°N 82.405227°E

== Nearest places ==
- Shringinari
- Vikramjot
- Chhawani
- Amorha- Historical Place of Raja Zalim Singh known as pargana Amorha
- Makhauda Dham
- Harraiya - Tehsil & Police Station
- Basti - District
- Gonda
- Ayodhya Nearest District
- Faizabad

== Nearest railway station ==
The Nearest Indian Railways Station is Babhnan Railway Station, Basti railway station, Ayodhya railway station Faizabad railway station with distance of 26.5 km.

== Higher education ==
The institute for higher education, J.K Inter College Lalpur Bedipur Basti , National Inter College Harraiya basti, Acharya Narendra Dev College of Pharmacy Babhnan, Nandani Nagar MahaVidayala

== Gallery ==
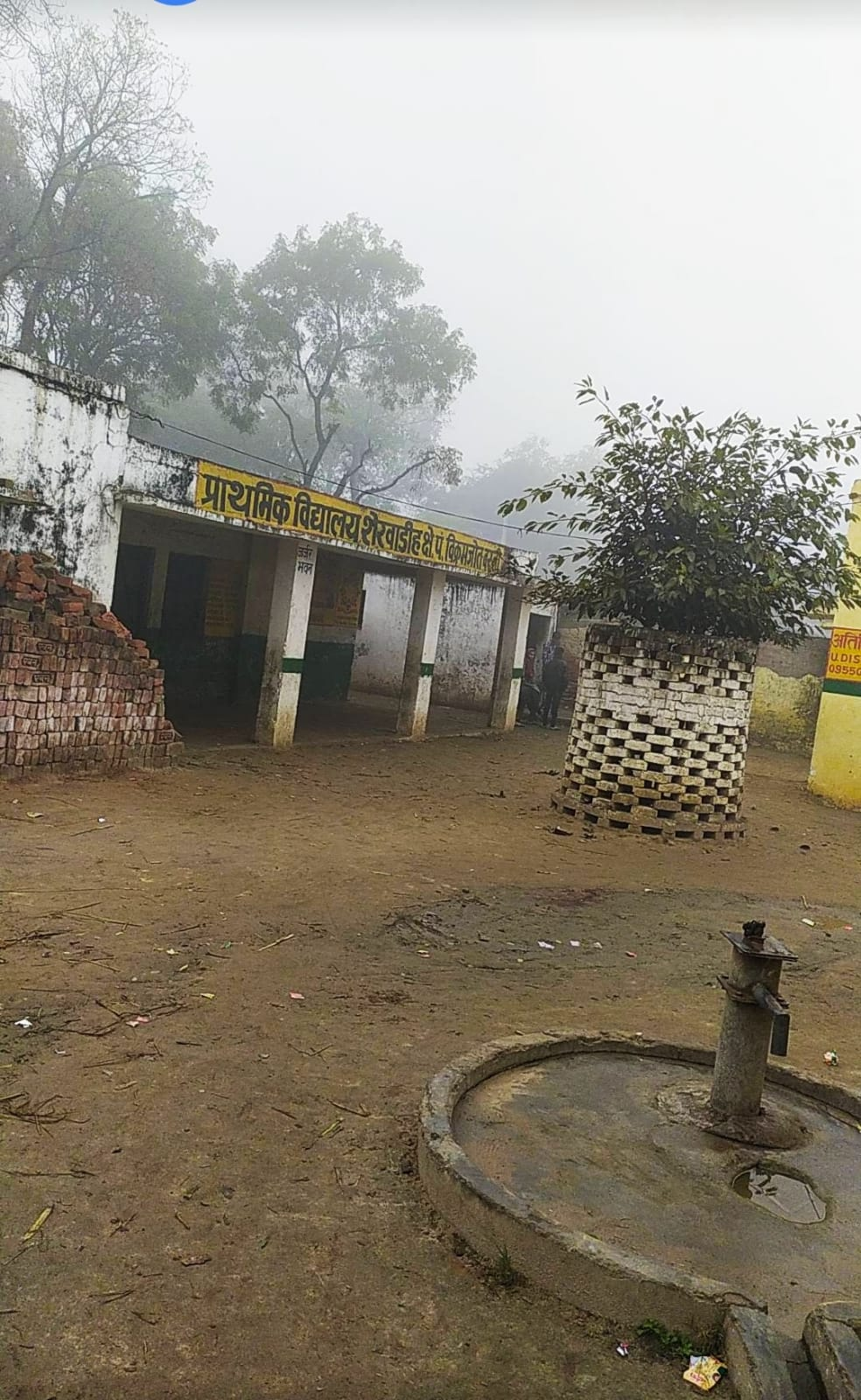

Sherwadeeh Village Primary School
