= Rajendra Prasad Chaudhary =

Member of the Uttar Pradesh Legislative Assembly

Member of Uttar Pradesh Legislative Assembly
- Incumbent
- Assumed office March 2022
- Preceded by: Sanjay Pratap Jaiswal
- In office May 2007 – March 2012
- Preceded by: Anoop Kumar Pandey
- Succeeded by: Sanjay Pratap Jaiswal
- Constituency: Rudhauli

Personal details
- Born: 1 July 1961 (age 65) Basti, Uttar Pradesh
- Party: Samajwadi Party (2020–present)
- Other political affiliations: Bahujan Samaj Party (Before 2020)
- Spouse: Sheela Chaudhary (m. 1987)
- Children: 2
- Education: B.Ed. & LLB
- Occupation: Politician
- Profession: Agriculture

Rajendra Prasad Chaudhary is an Indian politician and a member of the 15th & 18th Uttar Pradesh Assembly from the Rudhauli Assembly constituency of Basti district. He is a member of the Samajwadi Party.

== Early life and education ==
Rajendra Prasad Chaudhary was born on 1 July 1961 in Kaithvaliya village of Basti, Uttar Pradesh, to a Hindu family of Santram Chaudhary. He married Sheela Chaudhary on 2 March 1987, and they had two children.

In 1989, He attended Deen Dayal Upadhyay Gorakhpur University and attained Post Graduate M.A. degree.

== Political career ==
Chaudhary has been a member of the 15th and 18th Legislative Assembly of Uttar Pradesh from Rudhauli (Assembly Constituency) of Basti district.

He started his political career in 2007 elections, he was elected MLA from Ramnagar (Assembly constituency) as a member of Bahujan Samaj Party. He defeated his nearest candidate Sanjay Pratap Jaiswal (Indian National Congress) by a margin of 5,601 (4.53%) votes.

In 2012 elections, Chaudhary again contested from Rudhauli (Assembly Constituency), but lost by his rival candidate Sanjay Pratap Jaiswal (Indian National Congress) by a margin of 5,843 (2.88%) votes.

In 2017 elections, Chaudhary again contested from Rudhauli (Assembly Constituency) and again lost by his nearest candidate Sanjay Pratap Jaiswal (Bharatiya Janata Party) by a margin of 21,805 (9.79%) votes.

In January 2020, Chaudhary was resigned from Bahujan Samaj Party and joined Samajwadi Party alongwith Ram Prasad Chaudhary, former MP Arvind Chaudhary, former MLAs Doodh Ram and Nandu Chaudhary in presence of Samajwadi Party Chief Akhilesh Yadav.

In 2022 elections, He was again elected MLA from Rudhauli (Assembly Constituency) as a member of Samajwadi Party. He defeated his nearest candidate Sangeeta Pratap Jaiswal (Bharatiya Janata Party) by a margin of 15,226 (6.49%) votes.

== Positions held ==
- 2007–2012: Member, 15th Legislative Assembly of Uttar Pradesh.
  - Member, Public Accounts Committee.
- 2022-Incumbent: Member, 18th Legislative Assembly of Uttar Pradesh.

== See also ==
- 15th Uttar Pradesh Assembly
- 18th Uttar Pradesh Assembly
- Rudhauli Assembly constituency
- Uttar Pradesh Legislative Assembly
- Basti Lok Sabha constituency
