= Ramwapur =

- Village
- Location in Uttar Pradesh, India Ramwapur (India)
- Coordinates: 26.7574099°N 82.7155026°E
- Country: India
- State: Uttar Pradesh
- District: Basti
- Tehsil: Harraiya

Government
  - Type: Panchayati raj (India)
  - Body: Gram panchayat

Languages
  - Official: Hindi
- Time zone: UTC+5:30 (IST)
- ISO 3166 code: IN-UP

Ramwapur is a village in Basti district in the state of Uttar Pradesh, India. The village is administered by a Sarpanch who is an elected representative of village as per constitution of India and Panchayati raj (India).

Particulars	Total	Male	Female
Total No. of Houses	99		
Population	665	349	316
Child (0-6)	101	53	48
Schedule Caste	41	29	12
Schedule Tribe	0	0	0
Literacy	74.07 %	83.76 %	65.08%
Total Workers	145	117	28
Main Worker	112	93	19
Marginal Worker	33	24	9
