= Sanjay Pratap Jaiswal =

Indian politician

MLA in Legislative Assembly of Uttar Pradesh
- In office March 2012 – March 2022
- Preceded by: Rajendra Prasad Chaudhary
- Succeeded by: Rajendra Prasad Chaudhary
- Constituency: Rudhauli (Assembly constituency)

Personal details
- Born: 12 February 1971 (age 55) Purani Basti, Basti, Uttar Pradesh
- Party: Bharatiya Janata Party (2017–present)
- Other political affiliations: Indian National Congress (2007–2017)
- Spouse: Sangeeta Jaiswal (m. 1994)
- Children: 2
- Occupation: MLA
- Profession: Politician, businessman

Sanjay Pratap Jaiswal (born 12 February 1971) is an Indian politician and a member of 16th and 17th Legislative Assembly of Uttar Pradesh. He represents the Rudhauli constituency of Uttar Pradesh and is a member of the Bharatiya Janata Party.

== Early life and education ==
Sanjay Pratap Jaiswal was born on 12 February 1971 in Purani Basti Basti district of Uttar Pradesh to father Pratap Narayan Jaiswal. In 1990, he enrolled in Kendriya Education Board Children Academy in Dehradun and attained High School Certificate. He married Sangita Jaiswal on 6 May 1994, with whom he has a son and a daughter.

== Political career ==
Jaiswal has been a member of the 16th and 17th Legislative Assembly of Uttar Pradesh. In 2012 elections, he was elected MLA from Rudhauli (Assembly constituency) as a member of Indian National Congress. He defeated his nearest candidate Rajendra Prasad Chaudhary (Bahujan Samaj Party) by a margin of 5,843 (2.88%) votes.

In 2017, Jaiswal resigned from Indian National Congress and joined BJP. In 2017 elections, he was again elected MLA from Rudhauli constituency as a member of Bharatiya Janata Party. He defeated Bahujan Samaj Party candidate Rajendra Prasad Chaudhary by a margin of 21,805 (9.80%) votes.

== Posts held ==
#	From	To	Position	Comments
01	March 2012	March 2017	Member, 16th Legislative Assembly of Uttar Pradesh	
02	March 2017	March 2022	Member, 17th Legislative Assembly of Uttar Pradesh	

== See also ==
- Uttar Pradesh Legislative Assembly
