= Sagra =

Sagra may refer to:

- Sagra, Uttar Pradesh, a village in Domariaganj, Uttar Pradesh, India
- Sagra, Diamond Harbour, a village in South 24 Parganas district, West Bengal, India
- Sagra, Russia, a rural locality (a settlement) in Sverdlovsk Oblast, Russia
- Sagra, Alicante, a municipality in the province of Alicante, Valencian Community, Spain
- La Sagra, a Spanish comarca
- Sagra (festival), an Italian local festival, very often involving food
- The Sagra del gelato ice-cream festival held in Massa Martana, Italy
- Sagra Musicale Malatestiana, a music festival held in Rimini, Italy
- Sagra di San Michele, an abbey in the Italian Val di Susa
- the Sagra River in ancient Italy, site of the Battle of the Sagra
- Sagra (beetle), a genus of beetles
