= National Highway 727G (India) =

National Highway in India

National Highway 727G
- Map of National Highway 727G in red

Route information
- Auxiliary route of NH 27
- Length: 70 km (43 mi)

Major junctions
- East end: Harraiya
- West end: Gonda

Location
- Country: India
- States: Uttar Pradesh

Highway system
- Roads in India; Expressways; National; State; Asian
← NH 27	→ NH 330

National Highway 727G, commonly referred to as NH 727G is a national highway in India. It is a secondary route of National Highway 27. NH-727G runs in the state of Uttar Pradesh in India.

== Route ==
NH727G connects Harraiya, Babhnan, Swaminarayan, Manakpur and Gonda in the state of Uttar Pradesh.

== Junctions ==
NH 27 Terminal near Haraiya.
NH 330 Terminal near Gonda.

== See also ==
- List of national highways in India
- List of national highways in India by state
