= Karmiya, Basti =

Karmiya is a small village of the Basti district, Uttar Pradesh, India.

== Demography ==
As of 2011 total number of families residing in this village were 47 and its total population was 251.
