= Ran Bahadur Singh =

Indian politician

MLA Harraiya Constituency
- In office 1957 to 1962

MLA Harraiya Constituency
- In office 1962 to 1967
- Succeeded by: Budhi Ram

MLC Basti
- In office 1967 to 1972

Personal details
- Born: 1921 Muradipur, Harraiya (District - Basti)
- Died: 1983 (aged 61–62)
- Party: Indian National Congress
- Spouse: Saraswati Singh
- Parent: Shiv Harakh Singh (Father)
- Education: LLB
- Alma mater: Banaras Hindu University

Ran Bahadur Singh was an Indian freedom fighter and politician. He represented Indian National Congress in 1957 Uttar Pradesh Legislative Assembly election and 1962 Uttar Pradesh Legislative Assembly election. Singh is the founder of several educational institutions in Harraiya. In 1947, He started National Inter College which is the first Senior Secondary School of Harraiya and one of the oldest in Basti district. He also founded Kisan Inter College Parashurampur, Harraiya.

== Electoral history ==
Singh entered into regional politics in 1957 Uttar Pradesh Legislative Assembly Election. He contested from Basti District, Harraiya (Assembly constituency). He was also a member of Provincial Congress Committee. He was two times MLA from Harraiya Constituency from 1957 to 1967. In 1967, Ran Bahadur Singh became the MLC from Basti Legislative Council.
