= Mahua Dabar =

Mahua Dabar was a small town in Basti district of Awadh in modern Uttar Pradesh, India (south of Basti, not to be confused with the surviving community of the same name near Gaur, north-west of Basti). This town was destroyed by the British Raj during the Indian Rebellion of 1857.

== History ==
In March–April during the Indian Rebellion of 1857, the inhabitants of Mahua Dabar intercepted a boat carrying six British soldiers. These soldiers were surrounded and killed by the people of Mahua Dabar. On 20 June 1857 the British 12th Irregular Horse Cavalry surrounded the town, destroyed almost every building, and according to local legend slaughtered every inhabitant. The town was razed to the ground and only farming was allowed. The tilling of the land removed all ruins of the destroyed town. Mahua Dabar, a town of 5,000 people, completely disappeared from history and geography.

In 1994, Mohammad Abdul Latif Ansari, the great-grandson of one of the survivors that managed to escape Mahua Dabar before the British encirclement of the town started researching the location of his ancestral destroyed town. The-then Basti district magistrate, R.N. Tripathi created a committee of historians from the University of Lucknow; and they found an 1831 map after 13 years of research which showed the location of the Mahua Dabar town. All the maps after 1857 showed the area as farmland.

On 3 July 2011, Jagdambika Pal and other members of Lok Sabha, lower house of the Parliament of India, opened Commemorative plaque at Mahua Dabar.
