= Rishyasringar =

Rishyasringar or Rishyasringa was an ancient Indian sage.

Rishyasringar may also refer to these films about him:

- Rishyasringar (1941 film), an Indian Tamil-language film
- Rishyasringar (1964 film), an Indian Tamil-language film
- Rishyasringan, a 1997 Indian film

== See also ==
- Shringi Rishi Dham, a Hindu temple in Bihar, India
- Shringirishi Temples in Bundelkhand, Uttar Pradesh, India
- Shringinari, a Hindu temple in Uttar Pradesh, India
