= Mugraha, Uttar Pradesh =

Mugraha
- Nickname: Mugrha
- Location in Uttar Pradesh, India
- Coordinates: 27.01495°N 82.48039°E
- Country: India
- State: Uttar Pradesh
- District: Basti
- Tehsil: Rudhauli

Population (2011)
  - Total: 1,592

Languages
  - Official: Hindi
- Time zone: UTC+5:30 (IST)
- PIN: 272151
- Telephone code: 05542

Mugraha is a Gram Panchayat village located in Rudhauli Tehsil in Basti district in the Rudhauli Vidhan Sabha constituency and Basti Lok Sabha constituency. It has a population of 1,592 people.

There are three villages In Mugraha Gram Panchayat.

- Mugraha
- Ledwa
- Tahir Jot

== Geography ==
Mungraha is located at 27.01495°N 82.48039°E

== Language ==
Languages spoken in Mungraha include Awadhi in western areas and Bhojpuri in the eastern side. The district Basti may be considered as the demarcation of the languages Awadhi and Hindi. In city, due to increase in educated population, khari boli of Hindi is also observed in daily conversations.
