= Rudhauli Assembly constituency =

Constituency of the Uttar Pradesh legislative assembly in India

Coordinates: 27.03°N 82.80°E

Rudhauli
- Constituency No. 309 for the Uttar Pradesh Legislative Assembly

Constituency details
- Country: India
- Region: North India
- State: Uttar Pradesh
- District: Basti
- Lok Sabha constituency: Basti Lok Sabha constituency
- Reservation: None

Member of Legislative Assembly
- 18th Uttar Pradesh Legislative Assembly
- Incumbent Rajendra Prasad Chaudhary
- Party: Samajwadi Party
- Elected year: 2022

Rudhauli is a constituency of the Uttar Pradesh Legislative Assembly covering the city of Rudhauli in the Basti district of Uttar Pradesh, India.

Rudhauli is one of five assembly constituencies in the Basti Lok Sabha constituency. Since 2008, this assembly constituency is numbered 309 amongst 403 constituencies.

== Geographical scope ==
The constituency comprises parts of below areas: 2-Rudhauli Tehsil; KCs 1-Ramnagar, 2-Sagara, 4-Dasia, PCs 51- Amma, 52-Mahnowa, 53-Banarjijangal, 54-Padaree, 55- Hasanpur, 56-Dumaree, 57-Ourjangal, 58-Amrouli Sumali, 59- Pitout, 60-Pachanoo, 61-Delpar Khurd, 62-Basthanwa, 63-Majhouwa Khurd, 66-Jagatpur, 69-Pakaree Bhikhi, 70-Chamraha and 71-Sakroula of KC 3-Sonaha of 4-Bhanpur Tehsil.

== Members of the Legislative Assembly ==
#	Term	Name	Party	From	To	Days	Comment
1	4th Vidhan Sabha	Abdul Moiz Khan	Indian National Congress	March 1967	April 1968	402	
2	5th Vidhan Sabha	Mahammad Nabi	Bharatiya Kranti Dal	February 1969	March 1974	1,832	
After Delimitation order (1972) constituency renamed as Ramnagar Assembly constituency
3	6th Vidhan Sabha	Ram Samujh	Indian National Congress	March 1974	April 1977	1,153	
4	7th Vidhan Sabha	Babu Ram Verma	Janata Party	June 1977	February 1980	969	
5	8th Vidhan Sabha	Parmatma Prasad Singh	Indian National Congress (Indira)	June 1980	March 1985	1,735	
6	9th Vidhan Sabha	Karnal Keshari Singh	Indian National Congress	March 1985	November 1989	1,725	
7	10th Vidhan Sabha	Ram Lalit Chaudhary	Janata Dal	December 1989	April 1991	488	
8	11th Vidhan Sabha	Ram Lalit Chaudhary	Janata Dal	June 1991	December 1992	533	
9	12th Vidhan Sabha	Babu Ram Verma	Samajwadi Party	December 1993	October 1995	693	
10	13th Vidhan Sabha	Ram Lalit Chaudhary	Bahujan Samaj Party	October 1996	March 2002	1,967	
11	14th Vidhan Sabha	Anoop Kumar Pandey	Samajwadi Party	February 2002	May 2007	1,902	
12	15th Vidhan Sabha	Rajendra Prasad Chaudhary	Bahujan Samaj Party	May 2007	March 2012	1,762	
After Delimitation order (2008) constituency renamed as Rudhauli Assembly constituency
13	16th Vidhan Sabha	Sanjay Pratap Jaiswal	Indian National Congress	March 2012	March 2017	1,829	
14	17th Vidhan Sabha	Sanjay Pratap Jaiswal	Bhartiya Janata Party	March 2017	March 2022	1835	
15	18th Vidhan Sabha	Rajendra Prasad Chaudhary	Samajwadi Party	March 2022	Incumbent	1654	

== Election results ==
=== 2027 ===
2027 Uttar Pradesh Legislative Assembly election: Rudhauli
Party	Candidate	Votes	%	±%
INDIA				
NDA				
BSP				
NOTA	None of the above			
Majority				
Turnout				
gain from		Swing		

=== 2022 ===
Samajwadi Party candidate Rajendra Prasad Chaudhary won in last Assembly election of 2022 Uttar Pradesh Legislative Elections defeating Bhartiya Janata Party candidate Sangeeta Pratap Jaiswal by a margin of 15,226 votes.

2022 Uttar Pradesh Legislative Assembly election: Rudhauli
Party	Candidate	Votes	%	±%
SP	Rajendra Prasad Chaudhary	86,360	36.82	
BJP	Sangeeta Devi Urf Sangeeta Pratap Jaiswal	71,134	30.33	−10.2
BSP	Ashok Kumar Mishra	37,618	16.04	−14.7
AAP	Pushkaraditya Singh	24,463	10.43	
INC	Basant Chaudhary	4,451	1.9	−21.34
AIMIM	Dr Nihaluddin	3,238	1.38	
NOTA	None of the above	1,140	0.49	−0.52
Majority		15,226	6.49	−3.3
Turnout		234,531	54.47	+0.03
SP gain from BJP		Swing		

=== 2017 ===
2017 General Elections: Rudhauli
Party	Candidate	Votes	%	±%
BJP	Sanjay Pratap Jaiswal	90,228	40.53	
BSP	Rajendra Prasad Chaudhary	68,423	30.74	
INC	Sayeed Ahmad Khan	51,743	23.24	
NOTA	None of the above	2,221	1.01	
Majority		21,805	9.79	
Turnout		222,611	54.44	
BJP gain from INC		Swing	▲5.73	

=== 2012 ===
2012 General Elections: Rudhauli
Party	Candidate	Votes	%	±%
INC	Sanjay Pratap Jaiswal	55,950	27.55	▲2
BSP	Rajendra Prasad Chaudhary	50,107	24.67	▼8.95
SP	Ram Lalit Chaudhary	38,476	18.94	▲0.64
BJP	Aditya Vikram Singh	26,387	12.99	▲7.66
PECP	Ajay Kumar Pandey	18,518	9.12	New
	Remainder 10 Candidates	13,667	6.73	Steady
Majority		5,843	2.88	▼1.65
Turnout		203105	56.97	▲11.35
INC gain from BSP		Swing	▼6.07	

=== 2007 ===
2007 Assembly Elections: Ramnagar (Rudhauli)
Party	Candidate	Votes	%	±%
BSP	Rajendra Prasad Chaudhary	41,580	33.62	▲6.71
INC	Sanjay Pratap Jaiswal	35,979	29.09	▲25.04
SP	Anoop Kumar Pandey	22,639	18.30	▼19.67
BJP	Sanjay Chaudhary	6,596	5.33	▼1.84
SBSP	Raghvendra Mishra	3,026	2.44	▲2.44
Independent	Dhruv Chandar	1,965	1.58	Steady
BKD	Ram Narayan	1,827	1.47	▼21.13
	Remaining 14 Candidates	10,042	8.17	Steady
Majority		5,601	4.53	▼6.53
Turnout		1,23,654	45.62	▼12.65
Registered electors		2,71,025		
BSP gain from SP		Swing	▼4.35	

=== 2002 ===
2002 Assembly Elections: Ramnagar (Rudhauli)
Party	Candidate	Votes	%	±%
SP	Anoop Kumar Pandey	49,001	37.97	▲14.11
BSP	Ram Lalit Chaudhary	34,727	26.91	▼11.46
Independent	Sanjay Pratap Jaiswal	17,981	13.93	Steady
BJP	Saroj Singh	9,248	7.17	▼22.61
INC	Chandra Prakash	5,222	4.05	▼7.92
NLP	Haidar Ali	4529	3.51	▲3.51
	Remaining 10 Candidates	8,338	6.46	Steady
Majority		14,274	11.06	▼3.45
Turnout		1,29,046	58.27	▲0.82
Registered electors		2,21,467		
SP gain from BSP		Swing	▼0.40	

=== 1996 ===
1996 Assembly Elections: Ramnagar (Rudhauli)
Party	Candidate	Votes	%	±%
BSP	Ram Lalit Chaudhary	46,299	38.37	▲29.50
SP	Babu Ram Verma	28,784	23.86	▼14.79
Independent	Anoop Kumar Pandey	22,289	18.47	Steady
IC(S)	Haidar Lal	9,393	7.78	▲7.78
SAP	Kaushal Kumar Pandey	7,453	6.18	▲6.18
	Remaining 5 Candidates	6,440	5.34	Steady
Majority		17,515	14.51	▲5.64
Turnout		1,20,658	57.45	▼4.19
Registered electors		2,13,629		
BSP gain from SP		Swing	▼0.28	

=== 1993 ===
1993 Assembly Elections: Ramnagar (Rudhauli)
Party	Candidate	Votes	%	±%
SP	Babu Ram Verma	46,929	38.65	▲38.65
BJP	Anoop Kumar Pandey	36,158	29.78	▲8.26
JD	Ram Lalit Chaudhary	18,190	14.98	▼14.61
INC	Parmatma Prasad Singh	14,536	11.97	▼10.73
	Remaining 9 Candidates	5,612	4.62	Steady
Majority		10,771	8.87	▲1.98
Turnout		1,21,425	61.64	▲8.83
Registered electors		2,00,911		
SP gain from JD		Swing	▲9.06	

=== 1991 ===
1991 Assembly Elections: Ramnagar (Rudhauli)
Party	Candidate	Votes	%	±%
JD	Ram Lalit Chaudhary	27,987	29.59	▼14.73
INC	Parmatma Prasad Singh	21,474	22.70	▼0.78
BJP	Anoop Kumar Pandey	20,353	21.52	▲16.24
JP	Babu Ram Verma	8,825	9.33	▲1.34
BSP	Tara Prasad	8,392	8.87	▼4.73
	Remaining 10 Candidates	7,562	7.99	Steady
Majority		6,513	6.89	▼6
Turnout		94,593	52.81	▼0.75
Registered electors		1,87,287		
JD hold		Swing	▼14.73	

=== 1989 ===
1989 Assembly Elections: Ramnagar (Rudhauli)
Party	Candidate	Votes	%	±%
JD	Ram Lalit Chaudhary	30,176	44.32	▲44.32
INC	Karnal Keshari Singh	21,978	23.48	▼20.84
BSP	Rajendra Prasad Chaudhary	12,725	13.60	▲13.60
JP	Babu Ram Verma	7,476	7.99	▼21.53
BJP	Anoop Kumar Pandey	4,943	5.28	▼3.14
	Remaining 10 Candidates	12,431	13.28	Steady
Majority		12,067	12.89	▼15.26
Turnout		93,598	53.56	▲10.64
Registered electors		1,84,761		
JD gain from INC		Swing	▼7.95	

=== 1985 ===
1985 Assembly Elections: Ramnagar (Rudhauli)
Party	Candidate	Votes	%	±%
INC	Karnal Keshari Singh	30,176	44.32	▲15.34
Independent	Babu Ram Verma	11,010	16.17	Steady
LKD	Ram Lalit Chaudhary	10,051	14.76	▲14.76
BJP	Vijay Sen	5,730	8.42	▲1.49
	Remaining 17 Candidates	11,120	16.33	Steady
Majority		19,166	28.15	▲24.29
Turnout		68,087	42.92	▼0.16
Registered electors		1,61,736		
INC gain from INC(I)		Swing	▲10.94	

=== 1980 ===
1980 Assembly Elections: Ramnagar (Rudhauli)
Party	Candidate	Votes	%	±%
INC(I)	Parmatma Prasad Singh	20,267	33.38	▲33.38
JP	Ram Lalit Chaudhary	17,922	29.52	▼14.56
BJP	Ramshabd Chaudhary	4,207	6.93	▲6.93
Independent	Sami Ullah	2,905	4.78	Steady
	Remaining 13 Candidates	15,419	25.39	Steady
Majority		2,345	3.86	▼11.24
Turnout		60,720	43.08	▼13.57
Registered electors		1,43,566		
INC(I) gain from JP		Swing	▼10.7	

=== 1977 ===
1977 Assembly Elections: Ramnagar (Rudhauli)
Party	Candidate	Votes	%	±%
JP	Babu Ram Verma	30,828	44.08	▲44.08
INC	Jagdambika Pal	20,266	28.98	▼6.08
Independent	Jai Datt Singh	15,117	21.61	Steady
Independent	Virendra Pratap	2,065	2.95	Steady
Independent	Surya Prasad	1,123	1.61	Steady
SSD	Khaddar Chaudhary	539	0.77	▲0.77
Majority		10,562	15.10	▲8.42
Turnout		69,938	56.65	▼4.96
Registered electors		1,25,693		
JP gain from INC		Swing	▲9.02	

=== 1974 ===
1974 Assembly Elections: Ramnagar (Rudhauli)
Party	Candidate	Votes	%	±%
INC	Ram Samujh	24,618	35.06	▲1.22
ABJS	Jai Dat Singh	19,926	28.38	▲8.86
BKD	Babu Ram Verma	15,870	22.60	▼19.79
INC(O)	Chandra Prakash	4,342	6.18	▲6.18
SWA	Shyam Sundar	1,428	2.03	▲2.03
	Remaining 4 Candidates	4,033	5.75	Steady
Majority		4,692	6.68	▼1.87
Turnout		70,217	61.61	▲12.06
Registered electors		1,18,262		
INC gain from BKD		Swing	▼7.33	

=== 1969 ===
1969 Assembly Elections: Rudhauli
Party	Candidate	Votes	%	±%
BKD	Mohammad Nabi	22,010	42.39	▲42.39
INC	Abdul Moiz Khan	17,570	33.84	▲2.01
ABJS	Indradev Mishra	10,134	19.52	▲0.95
CPI	Maulavi Murtaza Husain	1,779	3.43	▲3.43
PBI^	Lal Jee	429	0.83	▲0.83
Majority		4,440	8.55	▲7.56
Turnout		51,922	49.55	▼4.84
Registered electors		1,08,611		
BKD gain from INC		Swing	▲10.56	

^ Proutist Bloc India (Political party)

=== 1967 ===
1967 Assembly Elections: Rudhauli
Party	Candidate	Votes	%	±%
INC	Abdul Moiz Khan	16,334	31.83	▲31.83
Independent	Mohammad Nabi	15,824	30.84	▲30.84
ABJS	B. Dev	9,529	18.57	▲18.57
SWA	S. Nath	6,480	12.63	▲12.63
Independent	Mohd Ali	1,806	3.52	▲3.52
SSP	Dhondhey	1,337	2.61	▲2.61
Majority		510	0.99	▲0.99
Turnout		51,310	54.39	▲54.39
Registered electors		1,03,107		
INC win (new seat)				

== See also ==
- Rudhauli
- Seventeenth Legislative Assembly of Uttar Pradesh
- Basti Lok Sabha constituency
- Basti district
- List of constituencies of Uttar Pradesh Legislative Assembly
- Mugraha Village
