= Makhauda Dham =

- मखौड़ा धाम
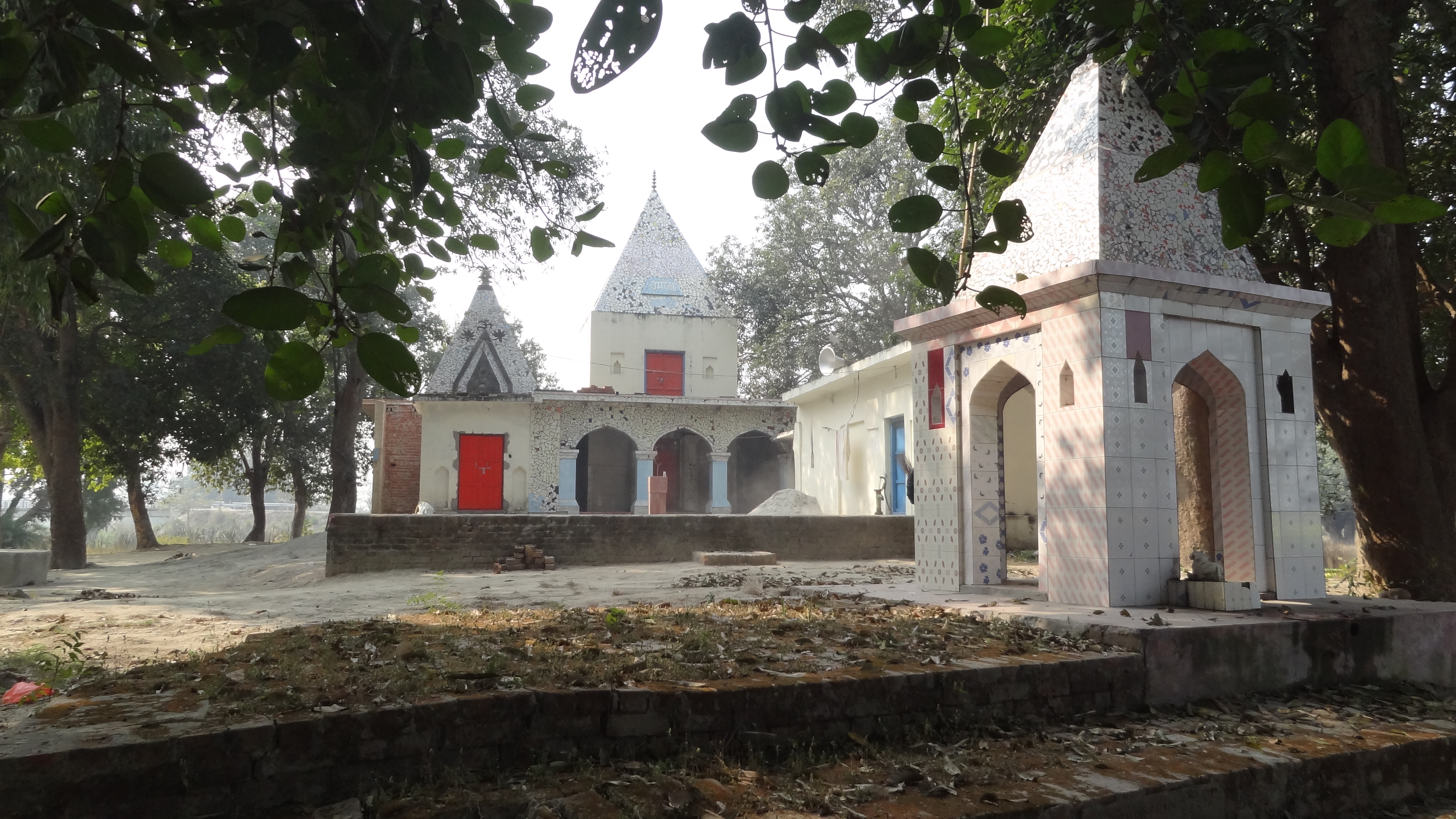

Religion
- Affiliation: Hinduism

Location
- Location: Harraiya, Basti district
- State: Uttar Pradesh
- Country: India
- Interactive map of Makhauda Dham
- Coordinates: 26.8812225°N 82.3023819°E

Makhauda Dham is a Hindu temple in Harraiya tehsil, Basti district, Uttar Pradesh, India. Makhauda Dham is situated on the banks of the Manorama river, 15 km north of Ayodhya.

== Festivals ==
Almost every festival of Hindus are celebrated. An annual fair is held on the first day of the month of Chaitra (चैत्र पूर्णिमा). On this occasion is a large number of pilgrimages gathering can be seen here.

== Geography ==
Madhauda Dham is located at 26.8812225°N 82.3023819°E.

== See also ==
- Ramrekha Mandir, another temple in the district
- Amorha Khas
