= Shriram Kuti =

Shriram Kuti श्रीराम कुटी
- Landmark
- Location in Uttar Pradesh, India
- Coordinates: 26.768424°N 82.392216°E
- Country: India

Languages
  - Official: Hindi
- Time zone: UTC+5:30 (IST)
- PIN: 272127
- Telephone code: 05546

Shriram Kuti is a residential area and landmark in Harraiya, Basti district in Utter Pradesh, India.

== Geography ==
Shriram Kuti is located at 26.768424°N 82.392216°E. It lies in close proximity to Ramrekha river. Shriram Kuti is situated nearby to Shriram Garden. The closest greatest town is Chhawani.
