= Sachchidanand Mishra =

Sanskrit scholar

Sachchidananda Mishra
- Born: 1 March 1971 (age 55); Basti, Uttar Pradesh, India
- Education: Sampurnanand Sanskrit University
- Occupations: Sanskrit scholar, professor of philosophy and author
- Writing career
- Language: Sanskrit, Hindi
- Genres: Sanskrit, Indian literature

Sachchidananda Mishra (Hindi: सच्चिदानन्द मिश्र, born March 1, 1971) is a Varanasi-based Sanskrit scholar. He is a professor of Philosophy and Religion at the Benares Hindu University. He was awarded the Maharshi Badrayan Vyas Award for Sanskrit for the year 2009 by Pratibha Patil, the then President of India. He specializes in Indian philosophy and Sanskrit grammar.

== Work ==
Mishra has edited and authored seven books, which include:

- Vedāntasāra of Sadānanda with the Bālabodhinī commentary of Āpadeva and the Bālavyutpattivardhinī Hindi commentary
- Mānasollāsa with the Mānasollāsavardhinī commentary by Ānanda Kṛṣṇa Śāstrī
- Nyāyadarśana Meṃ Anumāna
- Tattvacintāmaṇiprabhā
- Vyutpattivāda with a detailed introductory commentary in Hindi
