= Sehbra =

Sehbra is a village in Uttar Pradesh, India. It was first settled by Salem Al Quraishi in the thirteenth century with his wife and some servants; he was gifted the village by the raja of Basti on the birth of the raja's son.
