= Constituency Development Fund =

Central government funds given to members of parliament

Constituency Development Funds (CDFs) are central government funds given to members of parliament for expenditure on their constituencies, also called electoral districts. CDFs were first adopted in India. After introduction in Kenya in 2003, CDFs spread to other African countries and across the world.^{:1}

== Ghana ==
Ghana's CDF was instituted in 1996, when members of parliament were allocated 5% of the District Assemblies Common Fund (DACF).

== India ==
India has two CDF systems: the Members of Parliament Local Area Development Scheme (MPLADS) at the national level and the Member of Legislative Assembly Local Area Development Fund (MLA-LAD) for the Legislative Assembly of each of India’s 28 states. The MPLADS scheme was instituted in India in 1993. Under the MPLADS, an equal amount is allocated yearly to each parliamentary constituency.^{:27}

== Kenya ==
The Kenyan Constituency Development Fund (CDF) was introduced in 2003 during the Kibaki presidency.

The fund was designed to support constituency-level, grass-root development projects. It was aimed to achieve equitable distribution of development resources across regions and to control imbalances in regional development brought about by partisan politics. It targeted all constituency-level development projects, particularly those aiming to combat poverty at the grassroots. The CDF program has facilitated the putting up of new water, health and education facilities in all parts of the country, including remote areas that were usually overlooked during funds allocation in national budgets.

=== Funding ===
From the Kenyan Institute for Social Accountability

- The Constituency Development Fund was introduced in Kenya in 2003 with the passage of the CDF Act 2003 by the 9th Parliament of Kenya. The CDF Act provides that the government set aside at least 2.5% of its ordinary revenue for disbursement under the CDF program.
- Three quarters of the amount is divided equitably between Kenya’s 210 constituencies whilst the remaining 1/4th is divided based on a poverty index to cater for poorer constituencies.
- The constituency is the unit of political representation in Kenya of which there are 210 in the country. Each constituency is further subdivided into locations for local administrative purposes. A district is a grouping of 4-6 constituencies and before the implementation of CDF in 2003; the district was hitherto considered the unit of local development.

Year	Total annual CDF allocations
2003/4	KSh 1.3 billion
2004/5	KSh 5.6 billion
2005/6	KSh 7.2 billion
2006/7	KSh 9.7 billion
2007/8	KSh 10.1 billion
2008/9	KSh 10.1 billion
2009/10	KSh 12.0 billion
2010/11	KSh 14.3 billion

=== Corruption ===
There have been many examples of, and complaints about, misuse of the funds. This has led to the CDF Act 2013 (effectively repealing the CDF Act 2003) and significant changes to be applied in 2013.
