= Walterganj =

Coordinates: 26°52′N 82°43′E

Walterganj (Colloquial name) is a small town of Basti district in the state of Uttar Pradesh in India.

Walterganj is a commercial hub for adjacent villages as it hosts a sugar mill and a market. Besides the sugar mill, this town has a petrol refill station, a post office, a small railway station (Govindnagar station) and branches of State Bank of India and Purvanchal Gramin Bank.

There are several schools in town that serve students from nursery to Class XII. Sri Deshraj Narang Dayanand Inter College is the largest school where students are taught from Class I to XII.
