= Rudhauli =

- Town (Sub-District)
- Location in Uttar Pradesh, India
- Coordinates: 27.029285°N 82.798801°E
- Country: India
- State: Uttar Pradesh
- District: Basti

Area
  - Total: 229 km^{2} (88 sq mi)

Population (2011)
  - Total: 206,030
  - Density: 900/km^{2} (2,330/sq mi)

Languages
  - Official: Hindi
- Time zone: UTC+5:30 (IST)
- PIN: 272151
- Telephone code: 05542

Rudhauli is one of four tehsils in Basti district, Uttar Pradesh, in the Rudhauli Vidhan Sabha constituency and Basti Lok Sabha constituency, containing 284 villages. Samajwadi Party candidate Rajendra Prasad Chaudhary is MLA since 2022.

== Demographics ==
As of the 2011 India census, Rudhauli Tehsil has 31,067 households, and a population of 206,030, of which 102,940 are men and 103,090 are women. Children between the age of 0 and 6 make up 17.49% (36,036) of the total population.

The sex ratio of Rudhauli Tehsil is around 1001 men to 912 women, average for Uttar Pradesh state. The literacy rate of Rudhauli Tehsil is 54.11%; 63.18% of males and 45.06% of females are literate. The total area of Rudhauli is 228.81 square kilometres (88.34 sq mi), with a population density of 900 people per km^{2}. The entire population lives in urban areas.

== Politics ==
Rudhauli is a constituency of the Uttar Pradesh Legislative Assembly covering the city of Rudhauli in the Basti district of Uttar Pradesh, India. In 2022 UP Constituency election was elected from Rudhauli . According to the Association for Democratic Reforms; rajendra Prasad Chaudhary is the poorest MLA among all the MLA from Basti.
