= Ramrekha Temple =

Hindu temple in Uttar Pradesh, India

Ramrekha Mandir
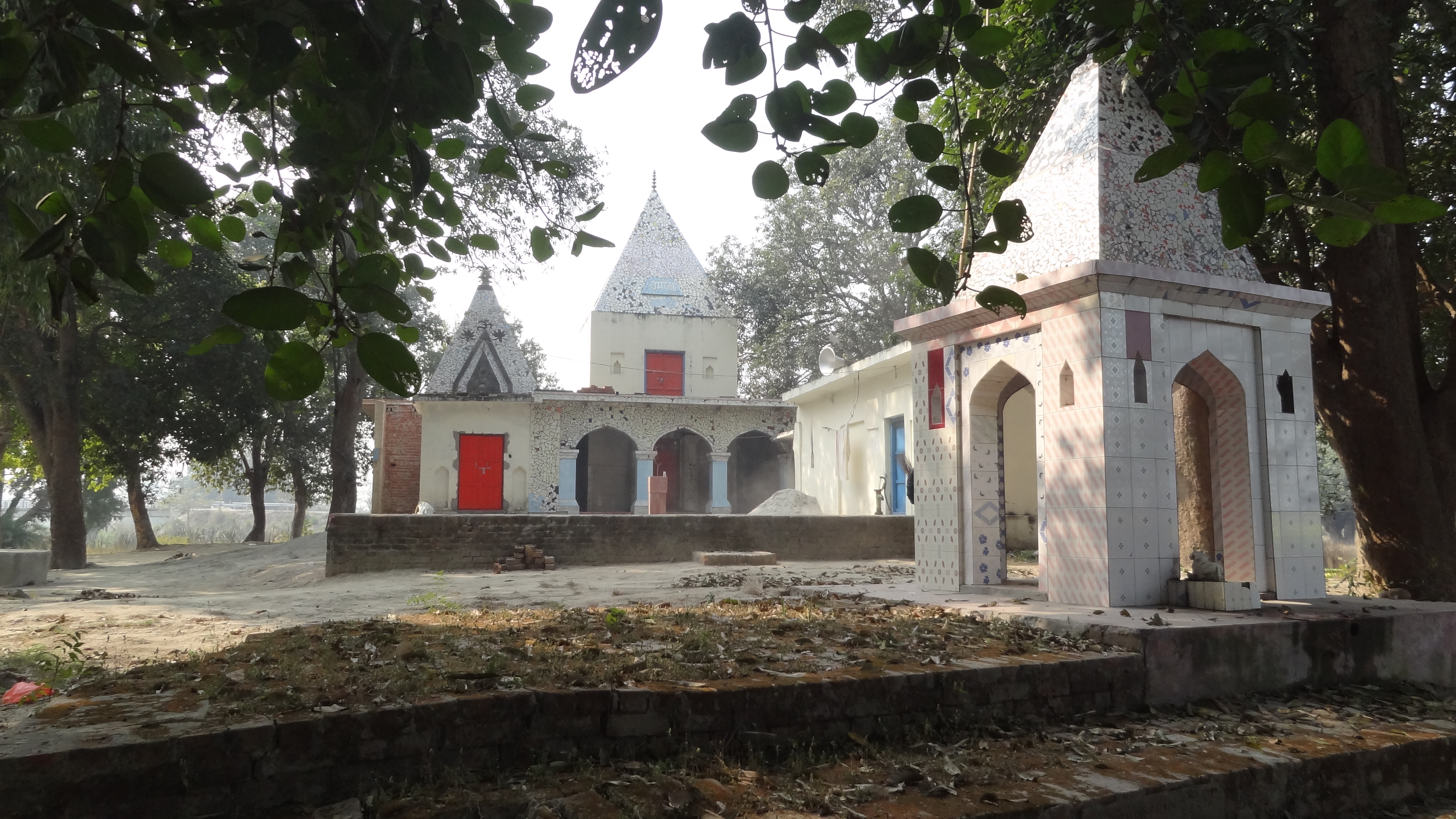
- External view of Ramrekha Mandir

Religion
- Affiliation: Hinduism
- Deity: Rama and Sita

Location
- Location: Basti district
- State: Uttar Pradesh
- Country: India
- Interactive map of Ramrekha Mandir
- Coordinates: 26.7691451°N 82.3874026°E

Ramrekha Mandir is a Hindu temple in Basti district, Uttar Pradesh, India, dedicated to Rama and Sita.

The pilgrims' first stop of 84 kosi parikrama of Ayodhya is at Ramrekha Temple in Basti. The temple is near Amorha (also known as Amorha Khas) in Basti district in the Indian state of Uttar Pradesh. Amorha Khas is a town and a Gram panchayat in Basti district.

== Festivals ==
Almost every Hindu festival is celebrated at the temple, with Ram Navami being the major festival. An annual fair is held on the 13th day of Hindu month Chaitra. This attracts many pilgrimages.

== Gallery ==
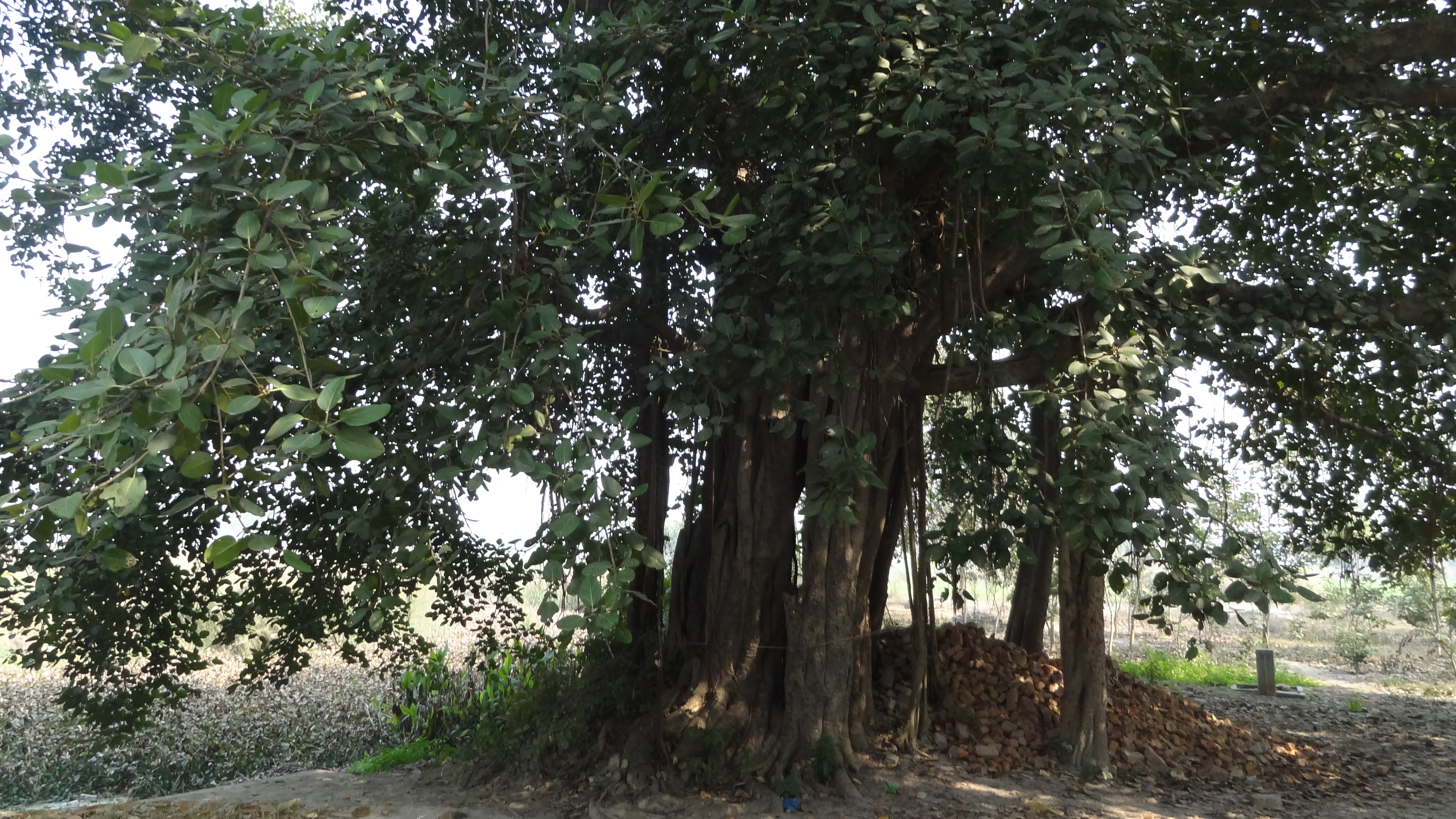
Ramrekha Mandir Old Tree, Amorha Khas, Chhawani, Basti, Uttar Pradesh

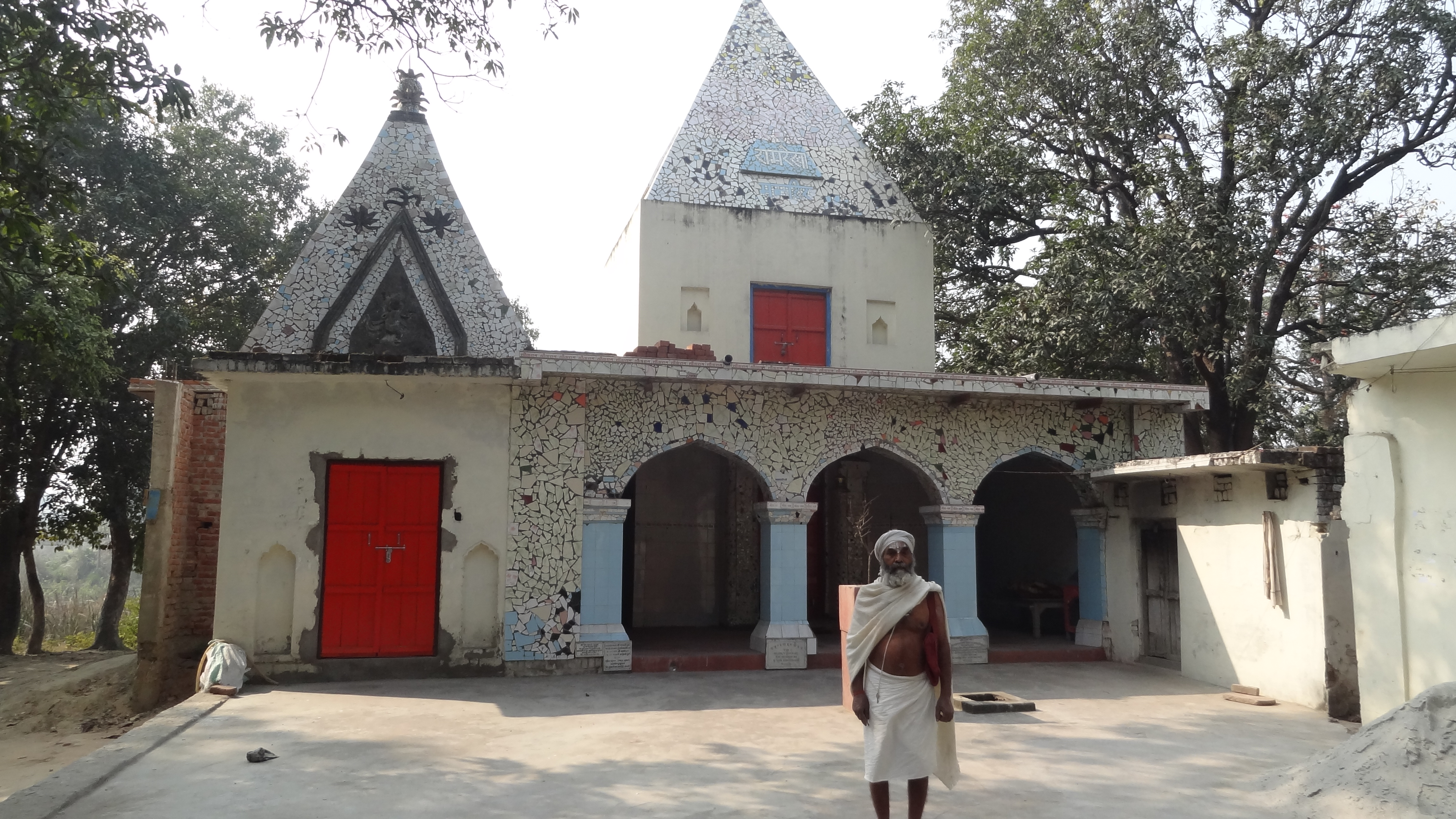
Ramrekha Mandir, Amorha Khas, Chhawani, Basti, Uttar Pradesh

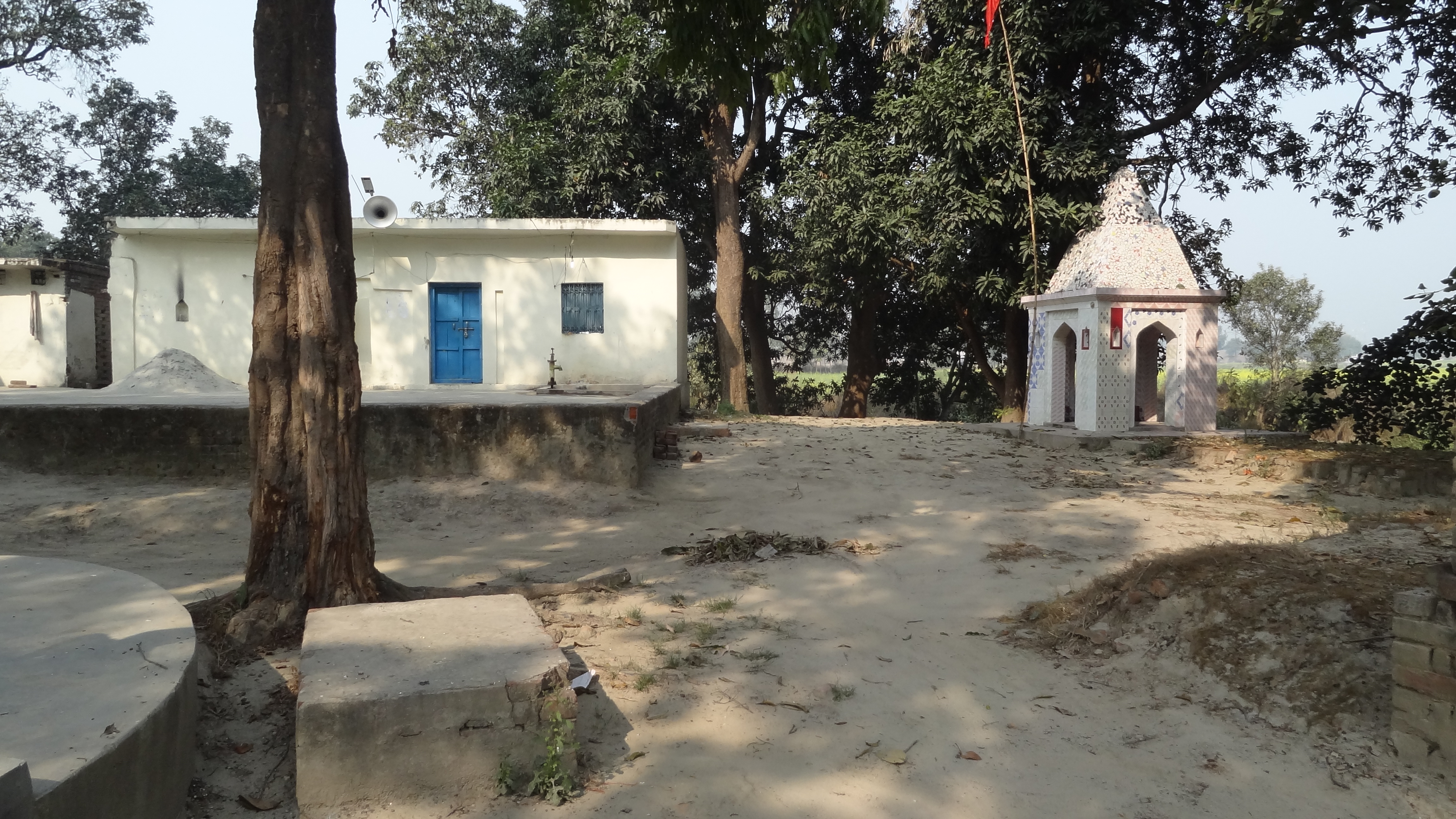
Ramrekha Mandir, Amorha Khas, Chhawani, Basti, Uttar Pradesh

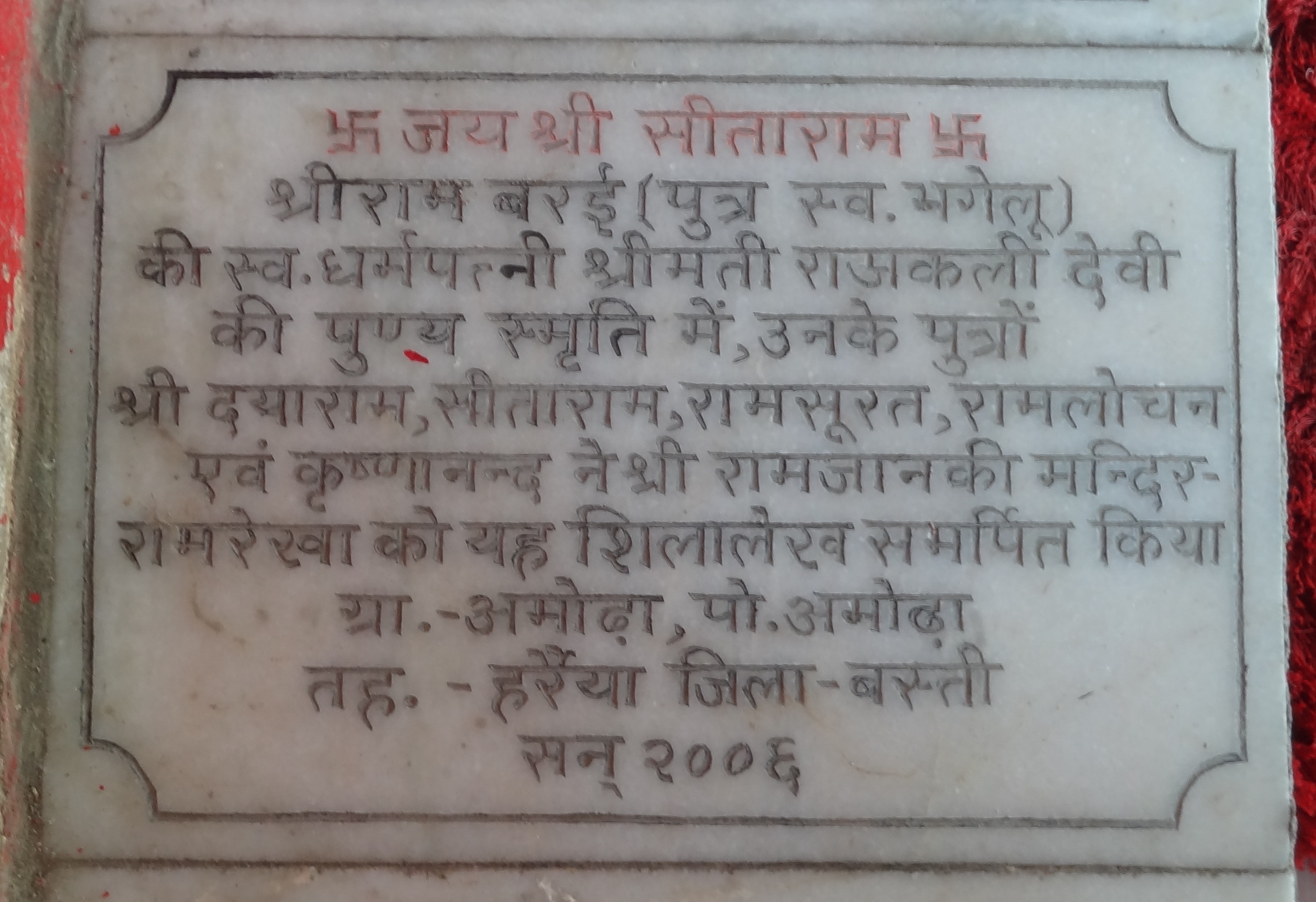
Shriram Barai's Inscription, Ramrekha Mandir, Amorha Khas, Chhawani, Basti, Uttar Pradesh
