= Harraiya =

- Town
- Location in Uttar Pradesh, India
- Coordinates: 26.79470°N 82.46350°E
- Country: India
- State: Uttar Pradesh
- District: Basti

Government
  - MLA: Ajay Kumar Singh

Population (2011)
  - Total: 9,158

Languages
  - Official: Hindi
- Time zone: UTC+5:30 (IST)
- PIN: 272155
- Telephone code: 05546
- Vehicle registration: UP, 51
- Website: http://basti.nic.in/

Harraiya is a town and tehsil in Basti district in the Indian state of Uttar Pradesh.

== History ==
In the Indian Rebellion of 1857, about 250 martyrs of Amorha State of Harraiya Tehsil were hanged by the British Government from peepal trees located at Chhawani.

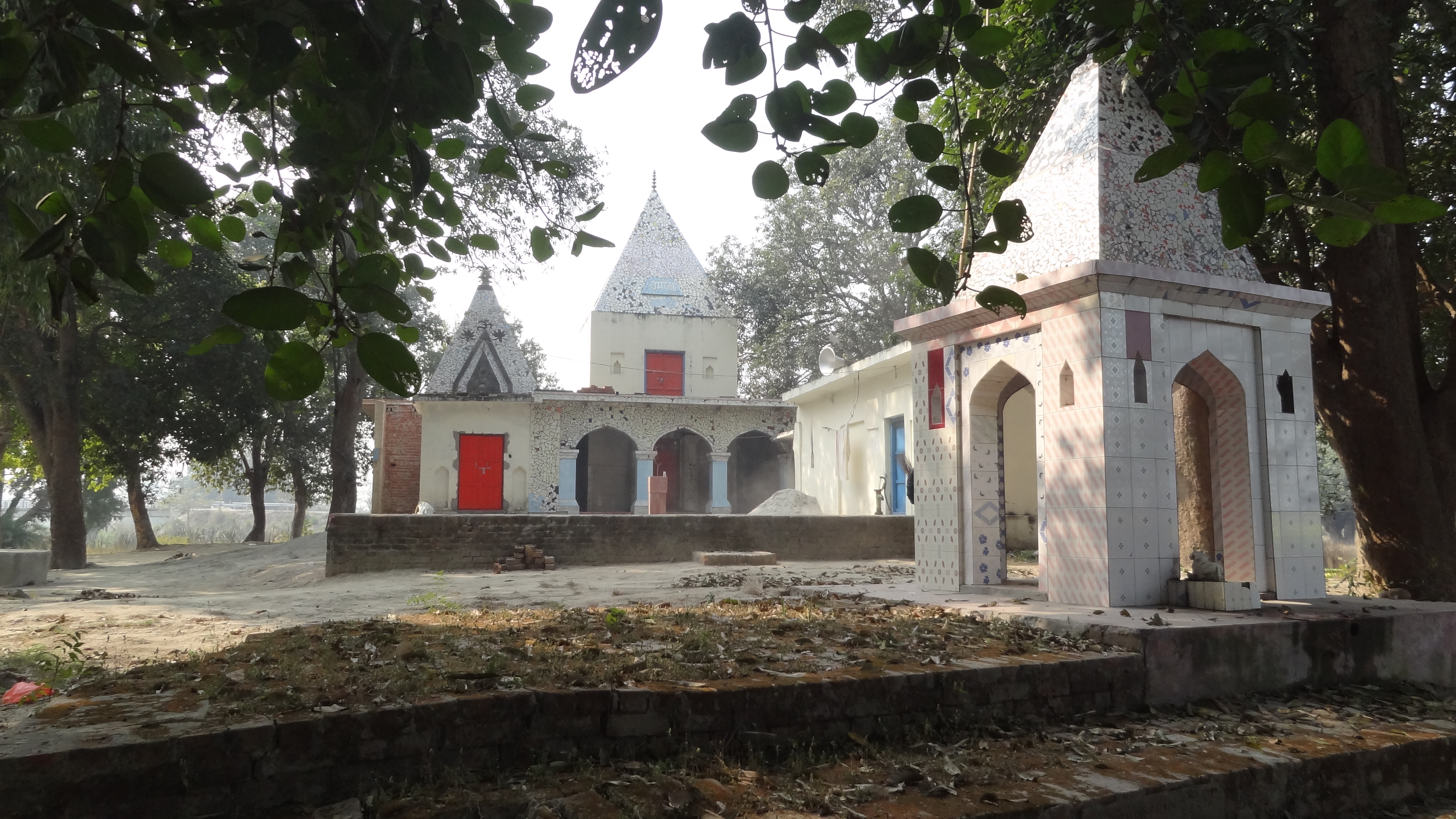
Ramrekha Mandir, Amorha, Basti, Uttar Pradesh, India (रामरेखा मन्दिर – अमोढ़ा)

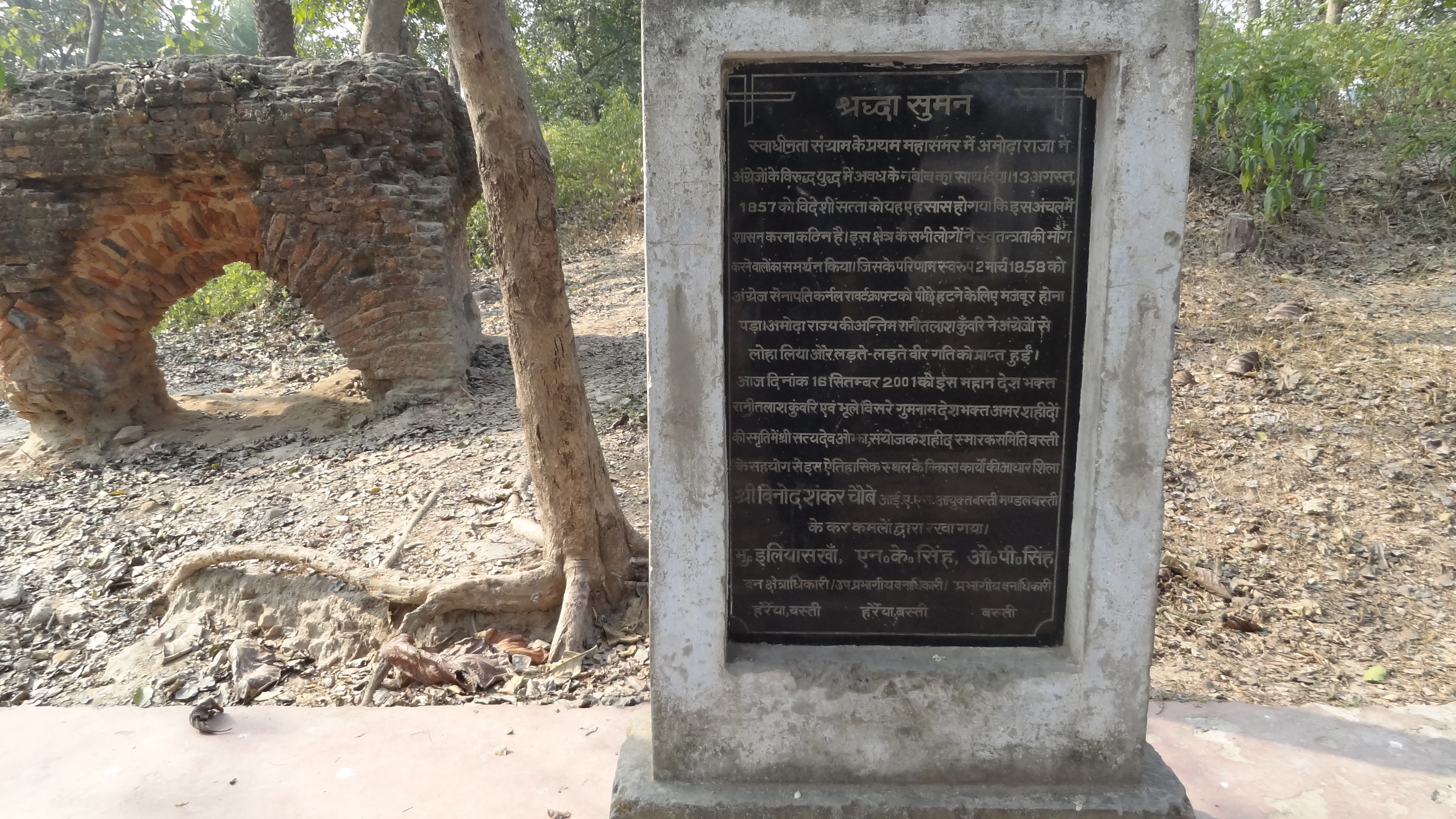
Raja Zalim Singh Memorial, Amorha, Basti, Uttar Pradesh

== Etymology ==
The original name of the place was Hàrí-rahìyā (हरि-रहिया), an Awadhi term meaning "The path of Hari", it was called so because Bhagwan Ram went to Vasishthi (Ashram of Maharshi Vasishtha) and later to Mithila via this place. With the time the name evolved to "Harraiya".

== Geography ==
Harraiya is located at 26.79470°N 82.46350°E.

== Demographics ==
As of 2011, Nagar Panchayat has total population of 9,158 of which 4,817 are males while 4,341 are females.

== Politics ==
Harraiya (Assembly constituency) is the legislative assembly constituency. BJP candidate Ajay Singh won the assembly election 2022 and now he is serving as MLA from Harraiya. Harraiya Times is a digital news portal for daily news updates.

== Notable Places ==
These are some notable places of historical/religious importance

- Shringinari
- Amorha Khas
- Tapsi Dham
- Makhauda Dham
- Chhawani
