= Shringinari =

Shringinari Temple is a Hindu temple around near Basti, Uttar Pradesh, India.
