= Sagra, Diamond Harbour =

Sagra
- Village
- Location in West Bengal Location in India
- Coordinates: 22.2615°N 88.1217°E
- Country: India
- State: West Bengal
- District: South 24 Parganas
- CD Block: Diamond Harbour II
- Elevation: 8 m (26 ft)

Languages
  - Official: Bengali
  - Additional official: English
- Time zone: UTC+5:30 (IST)
- PIN: 743504
- Telephone code: +91 3174
- Vehicle registration: WB-19 to WB-22, WB-95 to WB-99
- Lok Sabha constituency: Diamond Harbour
- Vidhan Sabha constituency: Falta
- Website: www.s24pgs.gov.in

Sagra is a village within the jurisdiction of the Diamond Harbour police station in the Diamond Harbour II CD block in the Diamond Harbour subdivision of the South 24 Parganas district in the Indian state of West Bengal.

== Geography ==
Sagra is located at 22°15′41″N 88°07′18″E. It has an average elevation of 8 metres (26 ft).

== Transport ==
A short stretch of local roads link Sagra to the National Highway 12.

== Healthcare ==
Sarisha Block Primary Health Centre at Sarisha, with 15 beds, is the major government medical facility in the Diamond Harbour II CD block.
