= Maharshi Vashishtha Autonomous State Medical College and OPEC Hospital, Basti =

Medical college in Uttar Pradesh, India

Maharshi Vashishtha Autonomous State Medical College, Basti
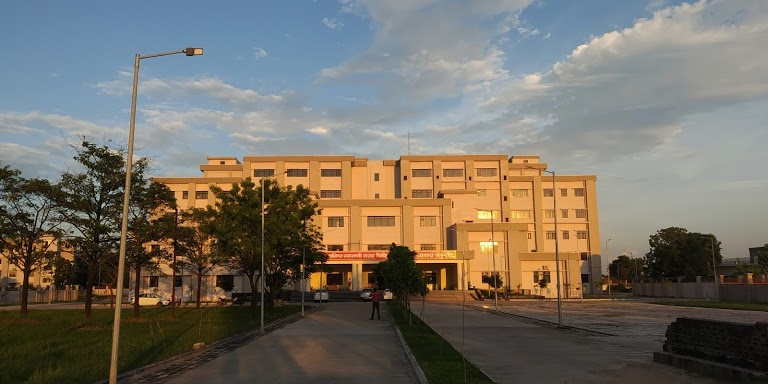
- Other names: ASMC Basti, GMC Basti, MVASMC Basti, OPEC Hospital
- Type: Medical College and Hospital
- Established: 2019; 7 years ago
- Academic affiliations: Atal Bihari Vajpayee Medical University
- Principal: Dr. Manoj Kumar
- Undergraduates: 100 (per annum)
- Postgraduates: 17 (per annum)
- Location: Basti, Uttar Pradesh, India; 26.765548°N 82.803984°E
- Campus: Urban
- Website: Official website

Maharshi Vashishtha Autonomous State Medical College, Basti (MVASMC, Basti) is a government medical college in Basti, Uttar Pradesh, India. The college is affiliated with Atal Bihari Vajpayee Medical University and is recognized by the National Medical Commission.

== History and description ==
The foundation stone of the college was laid in year 2016, along with Rajarshi Dashrath Autonomous State Medical College, Ayodhya. The college took in 100 undergraduate students in 2019. The medical college spreads over seventeen acres of land. MVASMC is associated with OPEC Hospital, its teaching hospital, which is spread across 34 acres.

== Courses ==
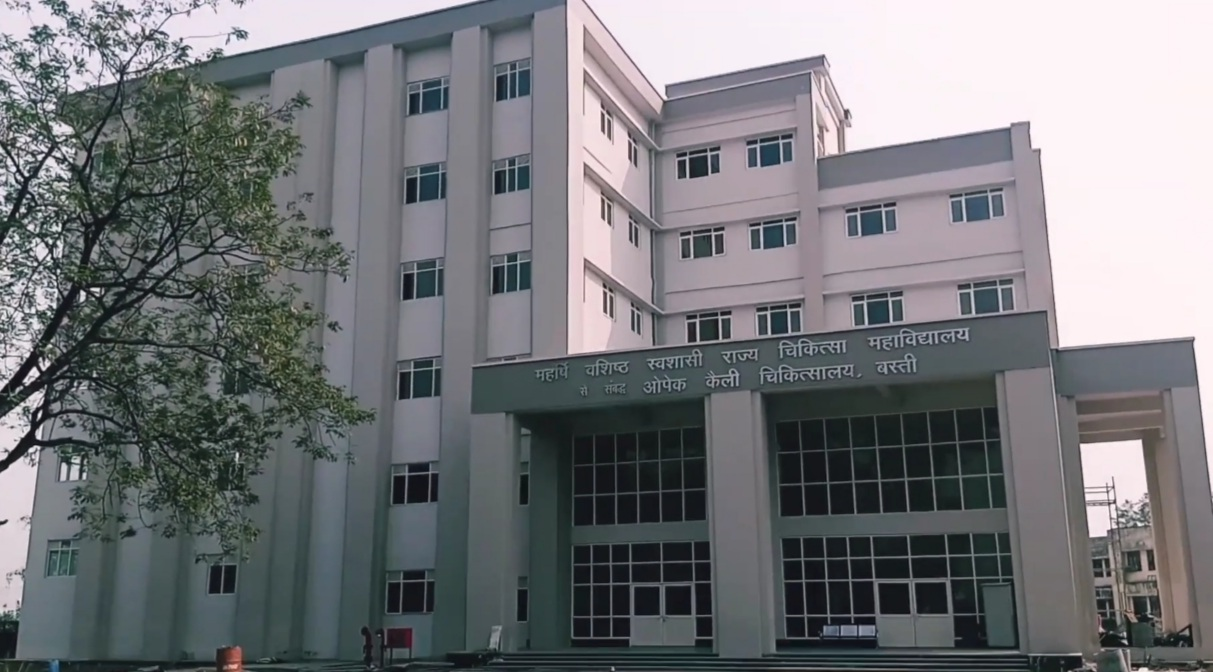
OPEC Hospital Kaili Basti New building

The college offers MBBS, MS, MD and DNB courses, along with nursing and allied health courses.
