= Sagra, Uttar Pradesh =

Village in Uttar Pradesh, India

Sagra is a village in Basti, Uttar Pradesh, India. Sagra is at the border of Basti and Siddharthnagar districts.
