= Member of Legislative Assembly Local Area Development Fund =

Budgets for Indian state legislators

Member of Legislative Assembly Local Area Development Funds (MLA-LAD) are constituency development funds provided by India's states to their MLAs (Members of the Legislative Assembly). Each MLA can use their Fund for small development projects in their constituency.^{:27}

== States ==
The MLA-LAD scheme was launched in Karnataka in the fiscal year 2001–02.

In Uttar Pradesh, the MLA-LAD funds are Rs 3 crore per year since 2020.
