= Basti division =

Administrative division of Uttar Pradesh, India

Coordinates: 26.812717°N 82.760130°E

Basti division

Basti division is one of the 18 administrative geographical units (i.e. division) of the northern Indian state of Uttar Pradesh. Basti city is the administrative headquarters of the division.

== Administration ==
In 1801, Basti became the location of a tehsil. The Basis division is one of the districts within Uttar Pradesh. There are 3,348 villages, 1,235 gram panchayats, 5 towns, and 4 tehsils within the district.

== Geography ==
The total size of the district is 2,688 square kilometers (1,038 sq mi) with rural areas accounting for 2,662.04 square kilometers (1,027.82 sq mi) and urbans areas accounting for 25.96 square kilometers (10.02 sq mi) of the land use.

== Demographics ==
The 2011 census reported a population of 2,464,464, with 1,255,272 being male and 1,209,192 being female. Rural areas had a male population of 1,182,846 and female population of 1,143,521 while urban areas had a male population of 72,426 and female population of 65,671. Hindi, Bhojpuri, and Awadhi are spoken in the district.

== Economy ==
The Basti division was listed of one of the 250 most backwards districts in 2006, and the area receives funding from the Backward Regions Grant Fund. The district has an agricultural industry.

== Works cited ==
- "About District". Basti division. Archived from the original on 21 June 2025.
- "Cultural Heritage". Basti division. Archived from the original on 19 March 2025.
- "Demography". Basti division. Archived from the original on 15 July 2025.
- "Economy". Basti division. Archived from the original on 5 August 2025.
