= Chhawani =

Chhawani Chhawani of Amorha State
- town
- Location in Uttar Pradesh, India
- Coordinates: 26.7773679°N 82.3797402°E
- Country: India
- State: Uttar Pradesh
- District: Basti

Population (2011)
  - Total: 2,000

Languages
  - Official: Hindi
- Time zone: UTC+5:30 (IST)
- PIN: 272127
- Telephone code: 05546

Chhawani is a place near Amorha in Basti district in the Indian state of Uttar Pradesh.

it is also known as a place of freedom struggle of freedom fighter - State Amorha (also known as Amorha Khas).

It was the main shelter for Indian fighters during the 1857 mutiny, and is noted for a Pipal tree where about 250 freedom fighter were hanged by the British Government in action after the murder of General Fort.

There is Shaheed Smarak Park in memory of freedom fighters. It has been brought into recognition by a great effort of Late Shri Ram Kumar yadav (Member of Legislative Council ) who was senior Congress Leader.Now it has been renovated by Great effort of Present MLA Shri Ajay Singh .

== Geography ==
Chhawani is located at 26.77547°N 82.37839°E.

Also Saheed Smarak Park - Chhawani is located at 26.77547°N 82.37839°E.

== Demographics ==
As of 2011 India census, Chhawani: is located near Amorha of Basti district in the Indian state of Uttar Pradesh with total of 500 families residing.

== Gallery ==
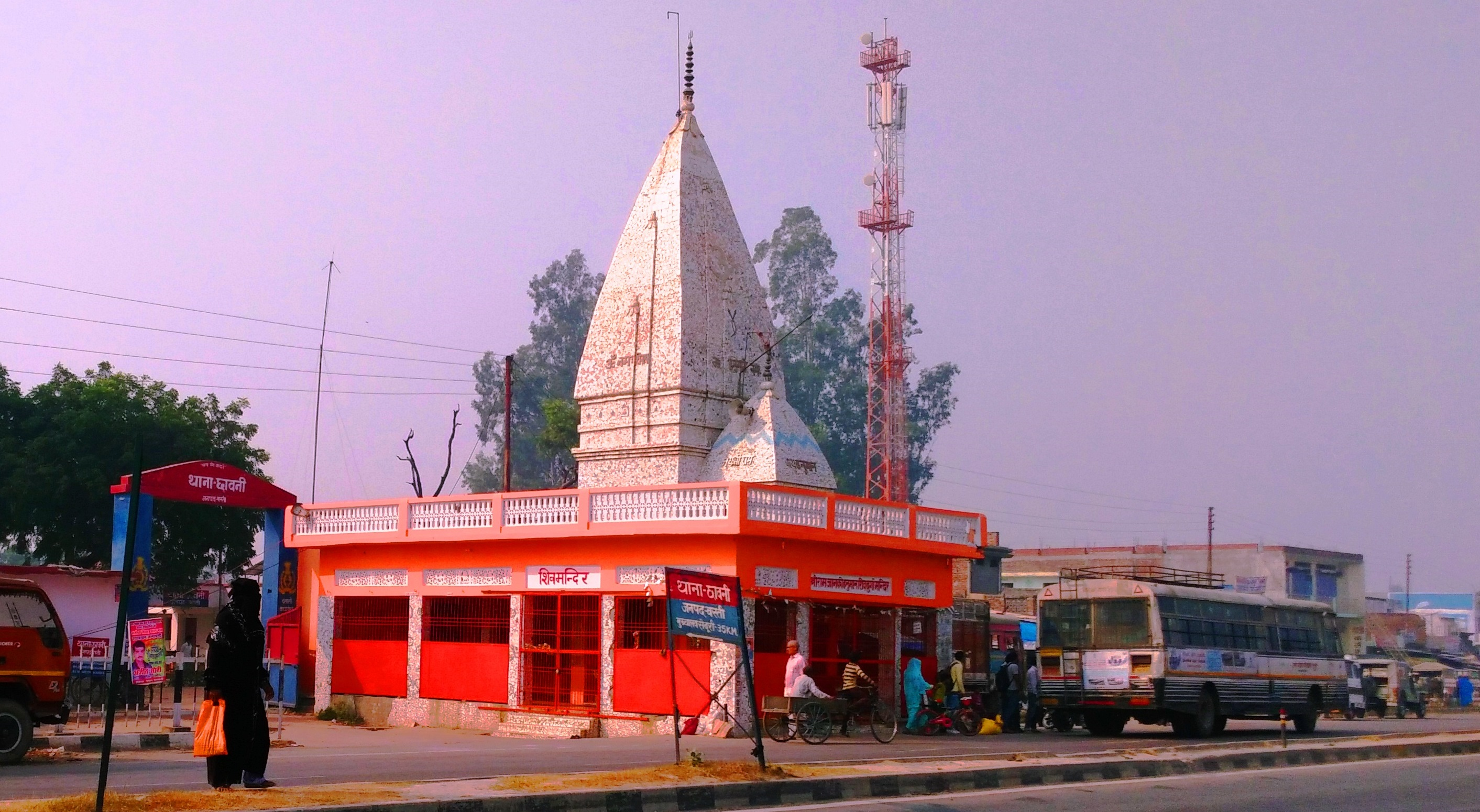
Sri Ram Janki Hanuman Shiv Durga Mandir, Chhawani, Amorha, Basti, Uttar Pradesh

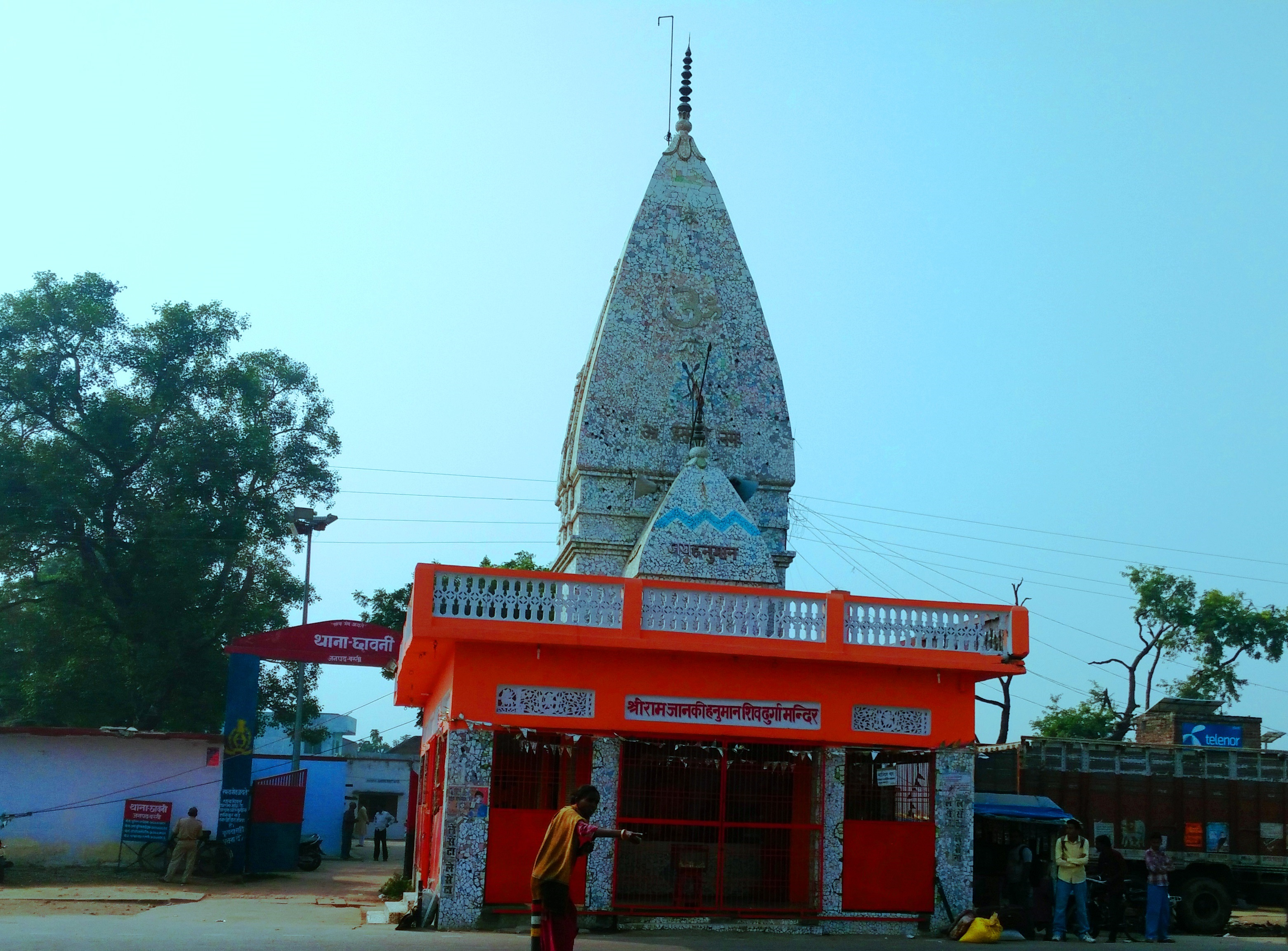
Sri Ram Janki Hanuman Shiv Durga Mandir, Chhawani, Amorha, Basti, Uttar Pradesh

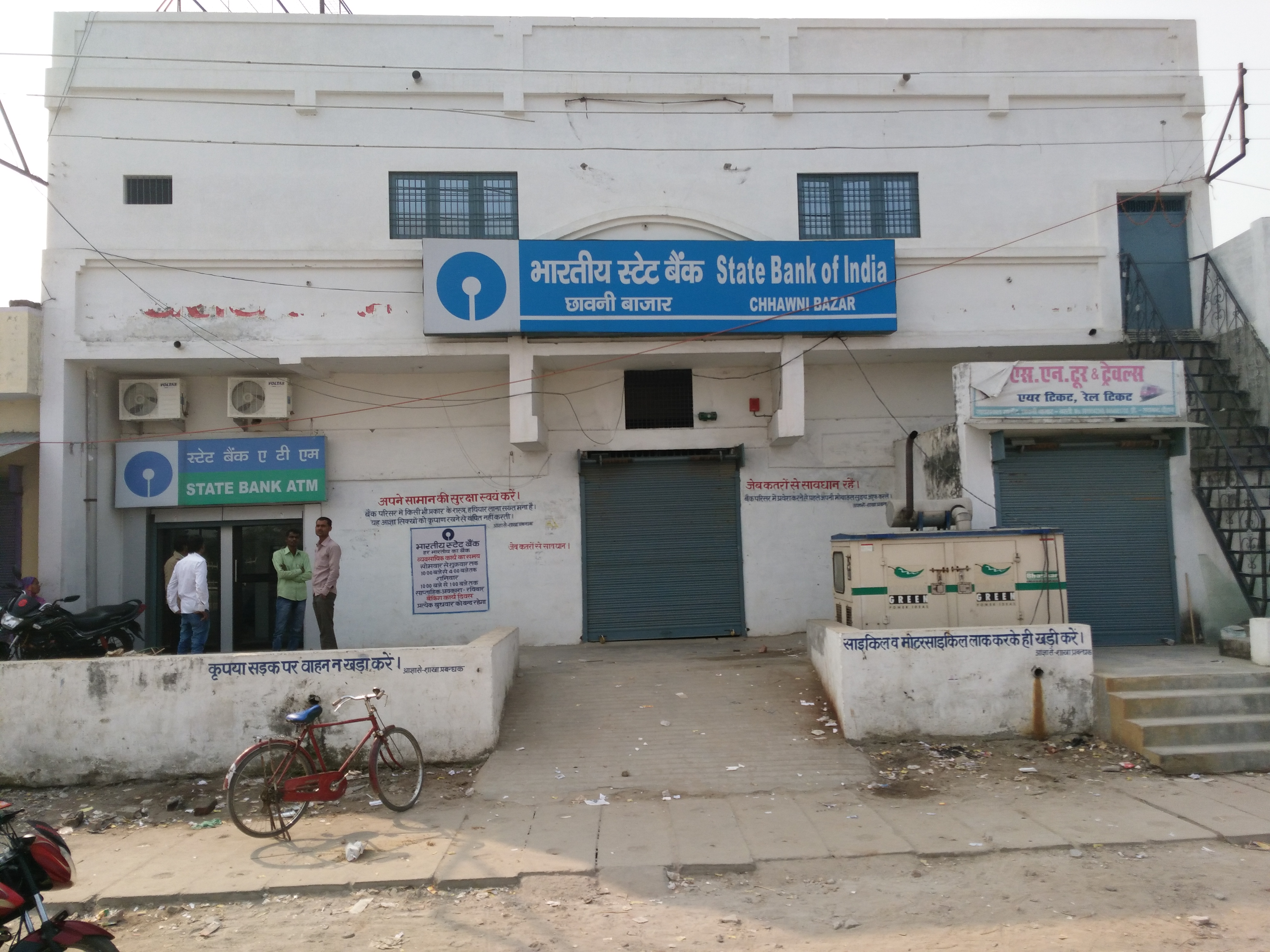
State Bank of India, Chhawani, Amorha, Basti, Uttar Pradesh

Arjun And brothers near Tiraha Chhawni bazar basti is very close to Saheed Smarak chhwani
