= Basti district =

- District
- Location of Basti district in Uttar Pradesh
- Country: India
- State: Uttar Pradesh
- Division: Basti
- Headquarters: Basti

Government
  - Lok Sabha constituencies: Basti
  - MP: Ram Prasad Chaudhary

Area
  - Total: 2,688 km^{2} (1,038 sq mi)

Population (2011)
  - Total: 2,464,464
  - Density: 916.8/km^{2} (2,375/sq mi)

Language
  - Official: Hindi
  - Additional official: Urdu
  - Regional languages: Awadhi, Bhojpuri

Demographics
  - Literacy: 67.2 per cent
  - Sex ratio: 963
- Time zone: UTC+05:30 (IST)
- Vehicle registration: UP-51
- Major highways: National Highway 28
- Average annual precipitation: 1166 mm
- Website: basti.nic.in

Basti district is one of the districts of Uttar Pradesh state, India, and a part of Basti Division. Basti city is the district headquarters.

The district is bordered by Sant Kabir Nagar to the east and Gonda to the west. To the south, the Ghaghara River forms its boundary with Ayodhya and Ambedkar Nagar, while to the north, it shares its boundary with Siddharth Nagar district. The district covers an area of 2,688 square kilometers.

== Origin of name and history ==
Basti was originally known as Vaishishthi. The origin of the name Vaishishthi is attributed to the fact that this area was the ashram of Rishi (sage) Vashistha in ancient period. Rama with his younger brother Lakshmana are described in the Ramayana as living with Rishi Vashistha for a period.

The district was formerly a major centre of Buddhism, being close to the holy sites of Kapilavastu and Shravasti. British records then claim that after the decline of Buddhism, the district gradually became covered by jungle and was the home of the Bhars and Tharus. The tract comprising the present district was remote and much of it was covered with forest. But gradually the area became inhabitable, for want of recorded and reliable history it cannot, with any degree of certainty, be said how the district came to be known by its present name :

“On account of the original habitation (Basti) having been selected by the Kalhans Raja Udai Raj Singh as a seat of his Raj, an event which probably occurred in the 15th century. In 1801, Basti became the Tehsil headquarters and in 1865 it was chosen as the headquarters of the newly established district. Raja Udai Raj Singh was the first ruler of Kalhans dynasty based at Basti.”

In 1801, the town Basti became a tehsil headquarter, and in 1865, it was chosen as the headquarters of the newly established Basti district of Gorakhpur Commissionary. Specifically, it happened on 6 May 1865.

At first, the plan was to use the Rapti and Jamuwar rivers as the boundary between Basti and Gorakhpur districts, but this plan was abandoned. Instead, the boundary cut across existing parganas, with a few areas east of the Jamuwar becoming part of Basti district, while the eastern parts of Maghar and Binayakpur parganas remained in Gorakhpur district. New tehsils were established, and most of the original 8 parganas were split into two, for a new total of 13 parganas. Subordinate to the parganas were 131 tappas, which were of significant administrative significance. The resulting setup was the following:

Amorha Khas is a historical place situated at a distance of 41 km from the district headquarters. Its old name is Ambodha, and it was once a province (state) of Raja Zalim Singh. Raja Zalim Singh's Mahal is here, old wall of mahal is still there with the mark of a bullet used by the English. The famous temple Ramrekha Mandir is here.

In the Great Revolt of 1857, about 250 martyrs of Amorha State were hanged by the British Government from peepal trees located at Chhawani.

== Geography ==
The district lies between the parallels of 26° 23' and 27° 30' North Latitude and 82° 17' and 83° 20' East longitude. Its maximum length from north to south is about 75 km. and breadth from east to west about 70 km. The district lies between newly created district Sant Kabir Nagar on the east and Gonda on the west on the south, the Ghaghra river near Amorha Khas previously known as Amorha Province or State of Raja Zalim Singh separates it from the Ayodhya and newly created district Ambedkar Nagar. On the north it is bounded by district Sidharth Nagar.

=== Flora and fauna ===
The forest cover of the district has dwindled with increasing use of land for agriculture. There are areas with high prevalence of mango (Mangifera indica), mahua (Madhuca longifolia), sal (Shorea robusta), and bamboo (Bambusa arundinacea) trees. Some of the wild animals of the district are the nilgai (Boselaphus tragocamelus), antelok (Anelok cervicapra), pig (Sus scrofa), wolf (Canis lupus), jackal (Conis aureus), fox (Vulpes bengalensis), hare (Lepus ruficandatus), monkey (Macaca mulatta), wild cat (Felis bengalensis) and the porcupine (Hystric leucura). Several species of game birds are also seen, including the peafowl (Pavo cristatus), the black partridge (Frencolinus francolinus) and the grey partridge (Francalinus pondicervanus). A number of migratory water fowls visit the water bodies of the district in winter, such as the goose (Anser anser), common teal (Anas crecca), red-crested pochard (Netta rufina), white-eyed pochard (Aythya rufa) and the wigeon (Mareca penelope). The cobra (Naja naja), krait (Bungarus caeruleus), and rat-snake (Ptyas mucosus) are commonly found. The Indian crocodile or naka (Crocodylus palustris), and the ghariyal (Gavialis gangeticus) are also found in the river Ghaghra. The common fish species are rohu (Lebeo rohita), bhakur (Catla catla), nain (Cirrhina mrigala), parhin (Wallagonia attu), krunch (Labeo calbasu), and tengan (Mystus seenghala).

== Demographics ==
Historical population
| Year | Pop. | ±% p.a. |
|---|---|---|
| 1901 | 656,285 | — |
| 1911 | 650,693 | −0.09% |
| 1921 | 684,396 | +0.51% |
| 1931 | 738,712 | +0.77% |
| 1941 | 776,969 | +0.51% |
| 1951 | 848,764 | +0.89% |
| 1961 | 1,010,706 | +1.76% |
| 1971 | 1,142,299 | +1.23% |
| 1981 | 1,366,434 | +1.81% |
| 1991 | 1,686,327 | +2.13% |
| 2001 | 2,084,814 | +2.14% |
| 2011 | 2,464,464 | +1.69% |

Religions in Basti district (2011)
| Religion | Percent |
| Hinduism | 84.52% |
| Islam | 14.79% |
| Buddhism | 0.40% |
| Other or not stated | 0.29% |

According to the 2011 census, Basti district had a population of 2,464,464. This ranked it the 178th most populous district in India. The district had a population density of 917 inhabitants per square kilometre (2,380/sq mi). Its population growth rate over the decade 2001–2011 was 18.21%. Basti had a sex ratio of 963 females for every 1000 males, and a literacy rate of 67.22%. The child sex ratio of Basti was 922 females for every 1000 males. 5.60% of the population lives in urban areas. Scheduled Castes and Scheduled Tribes make up 20.85% and 0.15% of the population respectively.

=== Languages ===
Languages of Basti district (2011)
1. Hindi (80.2%)
2. Awadhi (14.3%)
3. Bhojpuri (3.21%)
4. Urdu (2.14%)
5. Others (0.11%)

At the time of the 2011 Census of India, 80.25% of the population in the district spoke Hindi, 14.29% Awadhi, 3.21% Bhojpuri and 2.14% Urdu as their first language.

The district Basti may be considered as along the border of Awadhi and Bhojpuri speaking regions, and the dialect is consequently a mix of both. In cities and urban areas, due to increase in the educated population, Hindi is also spoken in daily conversations.

=== Indian diaspora ===
During the mid-1800s to the early 1900s many people from the district of Basti migrated through the Indian indenture system to Fiji, Mauritius, South Africa, Guyana, Jamaica, Trinidad and Tobago, Suriname, and other Caribbean countries. Most of them stayed and carried their traditions in those then European colonies. The former President of Guyana, Cheddi Jagan's parents were from Basti district. Former Leader of the Opposition of Trinidad and Tobago and founder of the Sanatan Dharma Maha Sabha, Bhadase Sagan Maraj's paternal grandparents were from Basti district. The maternal great-great-great-grandparents and maternal great-great-grandfather of Irfaan Ali, the President of Guyana, were from Basti district as well. In Trinidad, the name of the Indian majority village, Basta Hall, is derived from Basti.

== Medical services and hospitals ==
- Maharshi Vashishtha Autonomous State Medical College, Basti & OPEC Hospital Basti (U.P.)

== Administration ==
Basti town is the district headquarters of the district. Basti district, a part of Basti division, is formed of four tehsils: Basti Sadar, Harraiya, Bhanpur and Rudhauli and 14 development blocks, 139 Nyay Panchayats, two Parganas named Amorha and Nagar as well as 10 Gram Sabhas. The development blocks included are:

- Amorha (Pargana)
- Nagar (Pargana)
- Basti
- Bahadurpur
- Bankati
- Dubauliya
- Gaur
- Harraiya (Tahsil)
- Kaptanganj
- Kudaraha
- ParasRampur
- Ramnagar
- Rudhauli (Tehsil)
- Saltaua Gopal Pur
- Sau Ghat
- Vikram Jot

== Economy ==
The district is noted for its cotton textiles and sugar industries. Cottage industries and small-scale industries including the manufacturing units of brassware, iron and carpentry goods, agricultural implements, bricks, agro-products, foot-wear, soaps, candles, and pottery are present here. Basti is also known for its bamboo, eucalyptus (Eucalyptus teritrornis), mango and shisham (Dalbergia sissoo) populations. Four sugar factories are housed in the district. Sugarcane, maize, paddy, pulses, wheat, barley, and potato are commonly cultivated. Most of the population depends for their livelihood on agricultural practices. The district is well-connected through NH 28 which reflects on its good economy. The city is well-connected through railways also.

In 2006 the Ministry of Panchayati Raj named Basti one of the country's 250 most backward districts (out of a total of 640). It is one of the 34 districts in Uttar Pradesh currently receiving funds from the Backward Regions Grant Fund Programme (BRGF). City is also known for nationwide youth organisation National Association of Youth founded by Bhavesh Kumar Pandey and run from Basti. The organisation organizes Basti Mini Marathon every year since 2012.

== Transportation ==
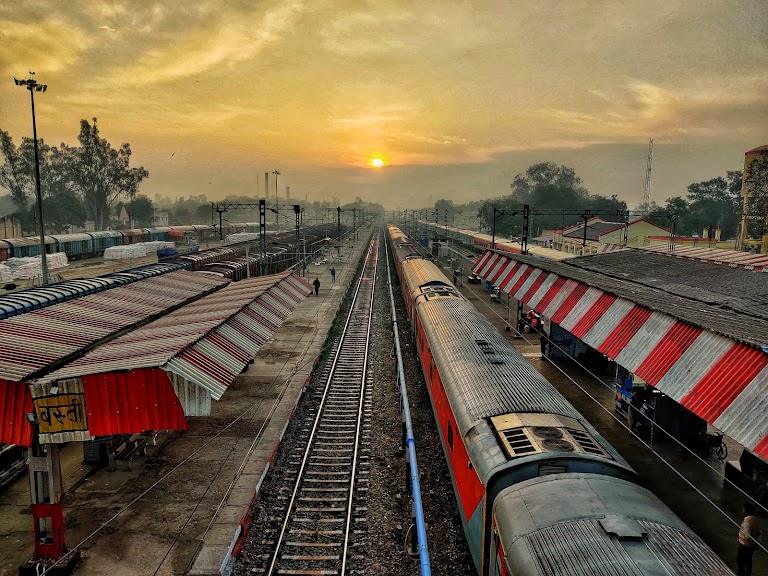
Basti Railway Platform

=== By air ===
Maryada Purushottam Shri Ram International Airport (Ayodhya) and Gorakhpur Airport are the nearby airports.

=== By railways ===
Basti railway station lies on the main line connecting Lucknow with Gorakhpur and places in Bihar and Assam in the east passes through the south of the district. The main line has 7 railway stations which are, from east to west, Munderwa, Orwara, Basti, Govindnagar, Tinich, Gaur, and Babhnan within the district. Gorakhpur-Lucknow Vande Bharat Express and Amrit Bharat express has official stoppage at Basti railway station.

=== By roadways ===
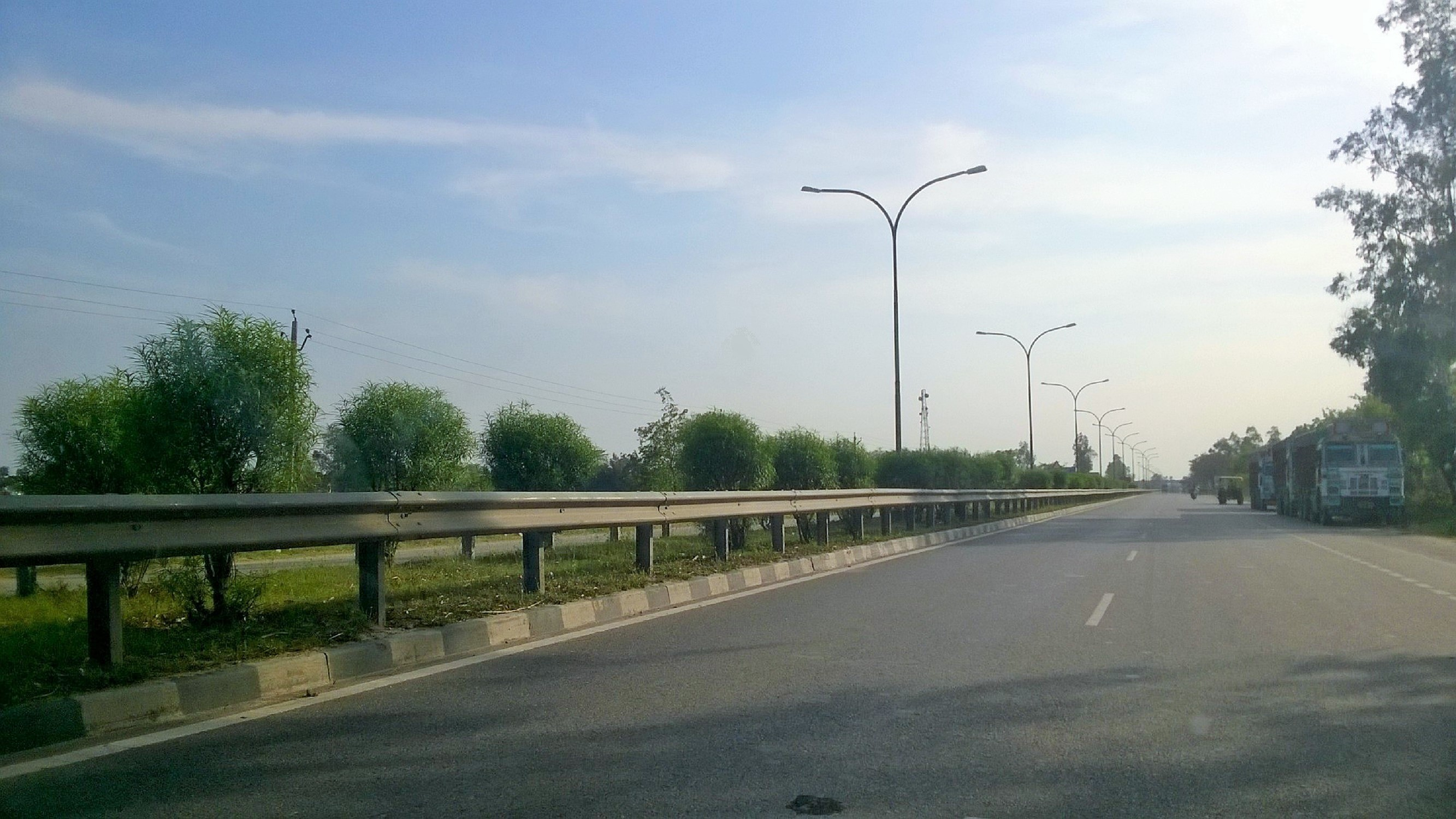
NH 28 near Basti

Basti is well connected with the nearby cities of Faizabad, Ayodhya, Gorakhpur and Gonda.

There is a daily Intercity express between Gorakhpur, Basti, Ayodhya, Gonda, and Lucknow. National Highway 2a part of the East West Corridor project of Government of India and NHAI, also passes through Basti.

== Landmarks ==
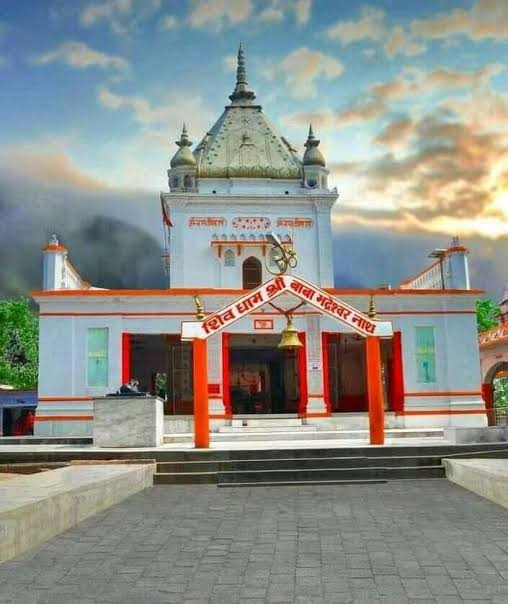
Bhadeshwar Nath Temple Basti

- Amorha Khas is situated at a distance of 41 km from the district headquarters. Its old name was Ambodha, and it was once a province (state) of Surajbansi Rajput Raja Zalim Singh. Zalim Singh's Mahal is here, Old wall of mahal is still there with the mark of a bullet used by the English. Also a temple Ramrekha Mandir is here.
- Chhawani is a police station and is situated at a distance of 40 km from the district headquarters. It was the main shelter for Indian fighters during the 1857 mutiny.
- Vikramjot is a Block and small market of the Basti district 46 km away from the headquarters of Basti district.
- Harraiya is one of the tehsils in Basti district and also a legislative assembly.
- Ramrekha Mandir is one Hindu Mandir of Lord Ram & Goddess Sita.
- Makhauda Dham is a Hindu religious spot.

== Education ==
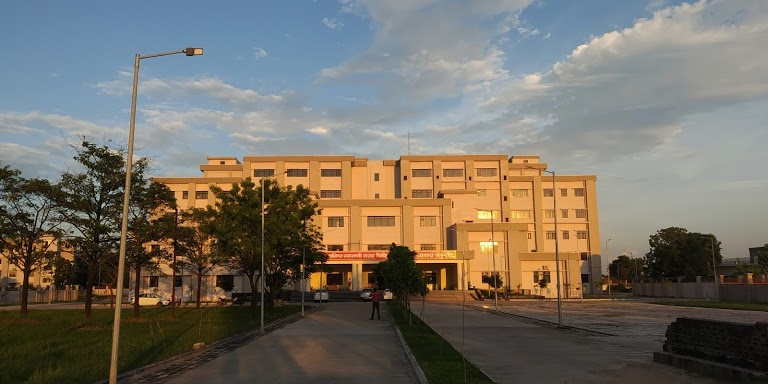
Maharshi Vashishtha Autonomous State Medical College

The district has a medical college, Maharshi Vashishtha Autonomous State Medical College, Basti, and an engineering college, Rajkiya Engineering College. The district follows a usual 10+2+3 pattern of education as elsewhere in India.

== Notable people ==
Notable people from the district include:

- Arvind Kumar Chaudhary – Former Member of Parliament for Basti (Lok Sabha constituency).
- Ram Prasad Chaudhary – Former Cabinet Minister in UP Government. Current Member of Parliament of Basti.
- Harish Dwivedi – Former Member of Parliament of Basti
- Jagdambika Pal – Former Chief Minister of UP Government. Currently Serving as Member of Parliament of Domariyaganj.
- Sarveshwar Dayal Saxena – Hindi poet
- Brijesh Shandilya – playback singer
- Ramchandra Shukla – literary historian
- Obaid Siddiqi – biologist
- Raghvendra Pratap Singh – Former Member of Legislative Assembly of Domariyaganj.
- Raj Kishor Singh – Former Cabinet Minister in Uttar Pradesh Government.
- Ran Bahadur Singh - freedom fighter and former MLA of Harraiya
- Yogendra Singh – sociologist
- Bhalchandra Yadava – former politician

== See also ==
- Sagra
- Mugraha
- Walterganj
- Sherwadeeh
