= Basti, Uttar Pradesh =

Basti Vaishishthi
- City
- Location in Uttar Pradesh, India Basti (India)
- Coordinates: 26.80°N 82.74°E
- Country: India
- State: Uttar Pradesh
- District: Basti

Population (2011)
  - Total: 114,657

Language
  - Official: Hindi
  - Additional official: Urdu
  - Regional: Awadhi, Bhojpuri
- Time zone: UTC+5:30 (IST)
- Postal code: 272001
- Vehicle registration: UP-51
- Website: www.basti.nic.in

Basti is a city, municipal board and administrative headquarters of Basti district in the Indian state of Uttar Pradesh. The district is part of Basti division. It is situated 202 kilometres east of the state capital, Lucknow.

== History ==
Basti was originally known as Vaishishthi. The origin of the name Vaishishthi is attributed to the fact that this area was the ashram of Rishi (sage) Vashistha in ancient period. Rama with his younger brother Lakshmana had been here for some time with Rishi Vashistha.

The tract comprising the present district was remote and much of it was covered with forest. But gradually the area became inhabitable, for want of recorded and reliable history it cannot, with any degree of certainty, be said how the district came to be known by its present name on account of the original habitation (Basti) having been selected by the Kalhans Raja Udai Raj Singh as a seat of his Raj, an event which probably occurred in the 16th century. In 1801, Basti became the Tehsil headquarters and in 1865 it was chosen as the headquarters of the newly established district. The region was under the rule of Kalhans dynasty based at modern Chaukhara. Maharaja Kesri Singh was the last ruler of Kalhans dynasty based at Chaukhara.

In the freedom struggle of 1857, about 250 martyrs of Amorha state were hanged by the British Government from peepal trees located at Chhawani.

== Geography ==
The district lies between the parallels of 26° 23' and 27° 30' North latitude, and 82° 17' and 83° 20' East longitude. Its maximum length from north to south is about 75 km. and breadth from east to west about 70 km. The district lies between the newly created district Sant Kabir Nagar on the east and Gonda on the west. On the south, the Ghaghra river near Amorha Khas previously known as Amorha Province or State of Raja Zalim Singh, separates it from district Faizabad and the newly created district, Ambedkar Nagar. While on the north, it is bounded by district Siddharth Nagar.

Basti is basically between Ayodhya and Gorakhpur.

== Demographics ==
Religions in Basti city (2011)
Religion	Percent
Hinduism	74.50%
Islam	24.50%
Christianity	0.41%
Sikhism	0.40%
Other or not stated	0.19%
Distribution of religions

As of 2011 Indian Census, Basti had a total population of 114,657, of which 60,095 were males and 54,562 were females. Population within the age group of 0 to 6 years was 13,349. The total number of literates in Basti was 84,389, which constituted 73.6% of the population with male literacy of 78.3% and female literacy of 68.5%. The effective literacy rate of 7+ population of Basti was 83.3%, of which male literacy rate was 88.6% and female literacy rate was 77.5%. The Scheduled Castes and Scheduled Tribes population was 17,036 and 275 respectively. Basti had 17,894 households in 2011.

Languages in Basti (2011)
1. Hindi (85.0%)
2. Urdu (9.08%)
3. Awadhi (5.08%)
4. Others (0.88%)

== Notable people ==
- Obaid Siddiqi, FRS (1932–2013), neurogeneticist, born in Basti

== Education ==
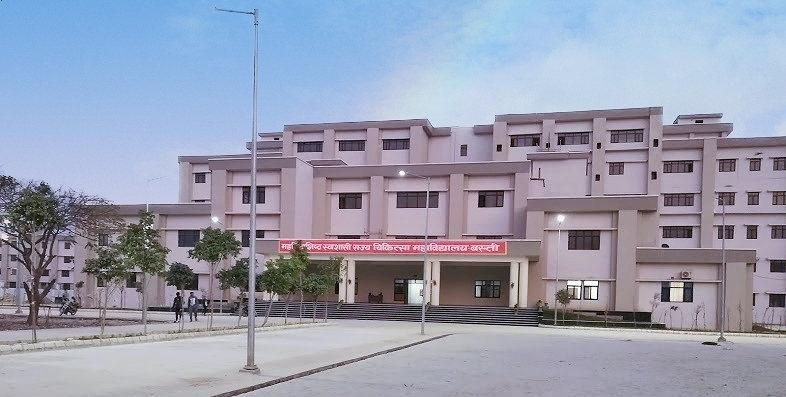
Maharshi Vashishtha Autonomous State Medical College Basti

The district has a medical college, Maharshi Vashishtha Autonomous State Medical College Basti, and an engineering college, Rajkiya Engineering College. Notable schools and institutions of the district are :

- St. Basil's School (affiliated to CISCE)

== See also ==
- Basti district
- Basti division
- Gorakhpur
- Ayodhya
