= Amorha =

Amorha Khas
- Village
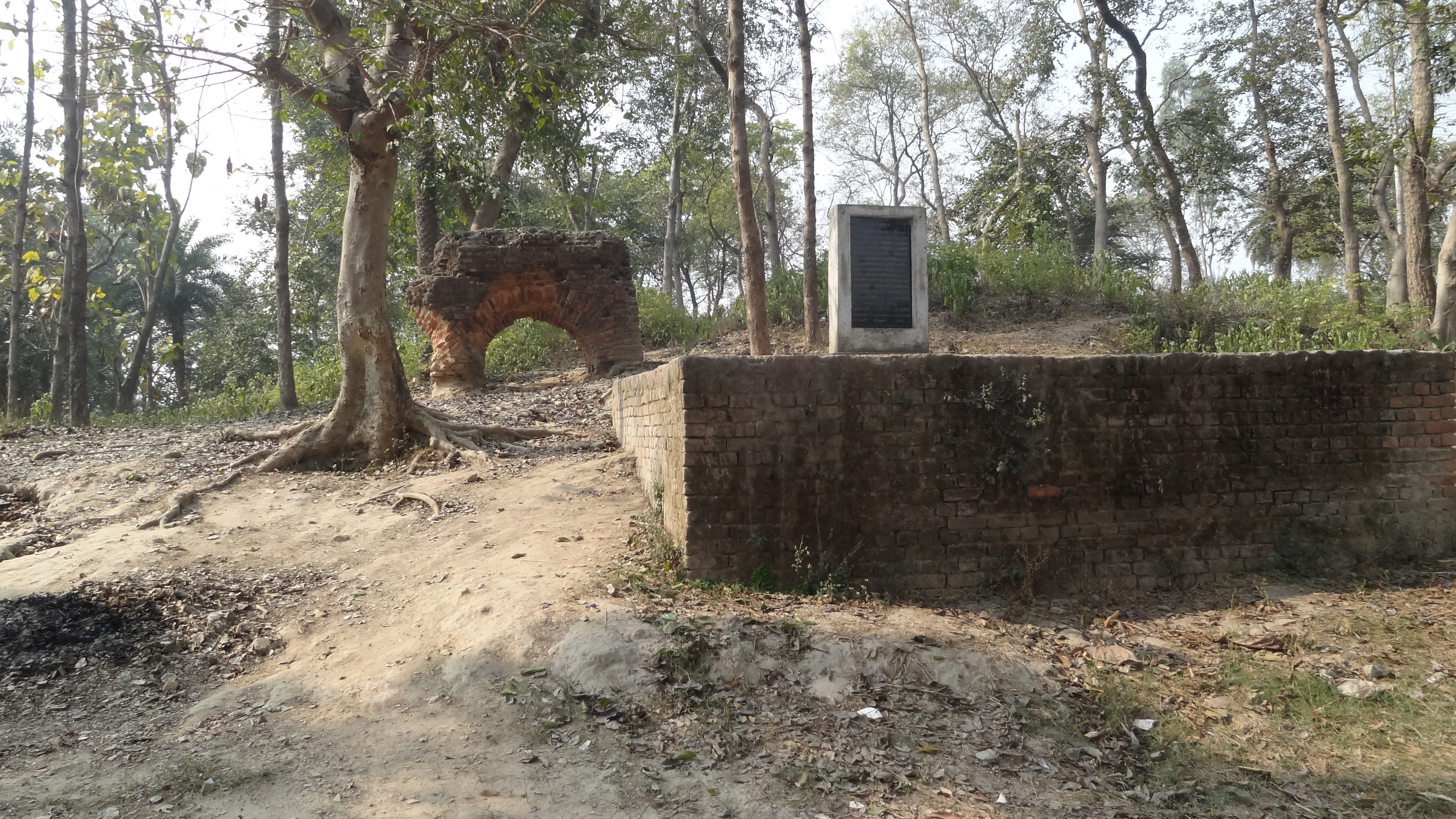
- Raja Zalim Singh Memorial, Amorha Khas

- Location in Uttar Pradesh, India Amorha Khas (India)
- Coordinates: 26.7625985°N 82.3938621°E
- Country: India
- State: Uttar Pradesh
- District: Basti
- Tehsil: Harraiya

Area
  - Total: 6.097 km^{2} (2.354 sq mi)

Population (2011)
  - Total: 5,977
  - Density: 980.3/km^{2} (2,539/sq mi)

Languages
  - Official: Hindi
- Time zone: UTC+5:30 (IST)
- PIN: 272127
- Telephone code: 05546
- Vehicle registration: UP-51

Amorha Khas (Amoṛhā Khās) is a gram panchayat in Basti district in the Indian state of Uttar Pradesh.

== Geography ==
Amorha Khas is located at 26.7625985°N 82.3938621°E.

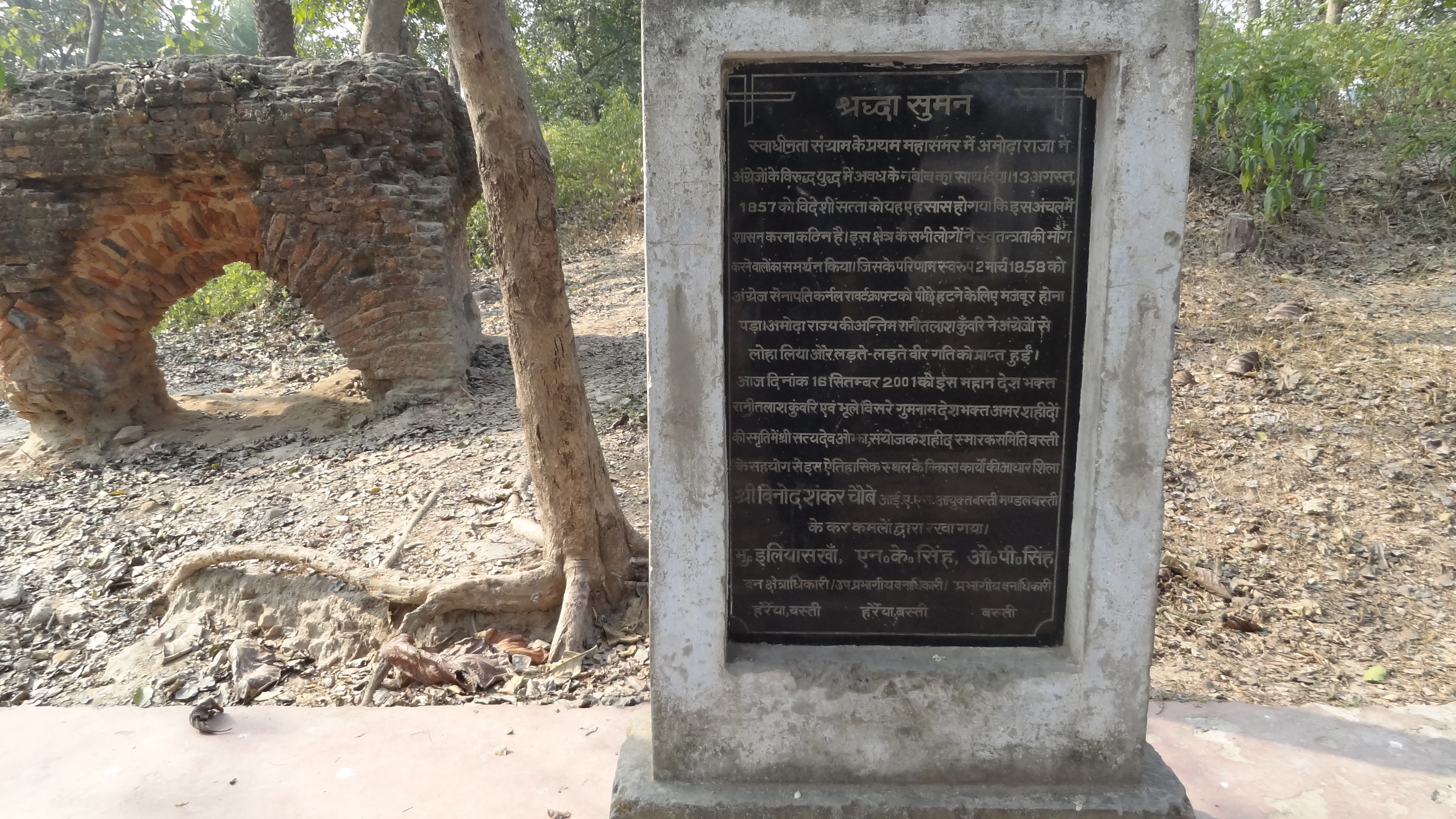
Amorha

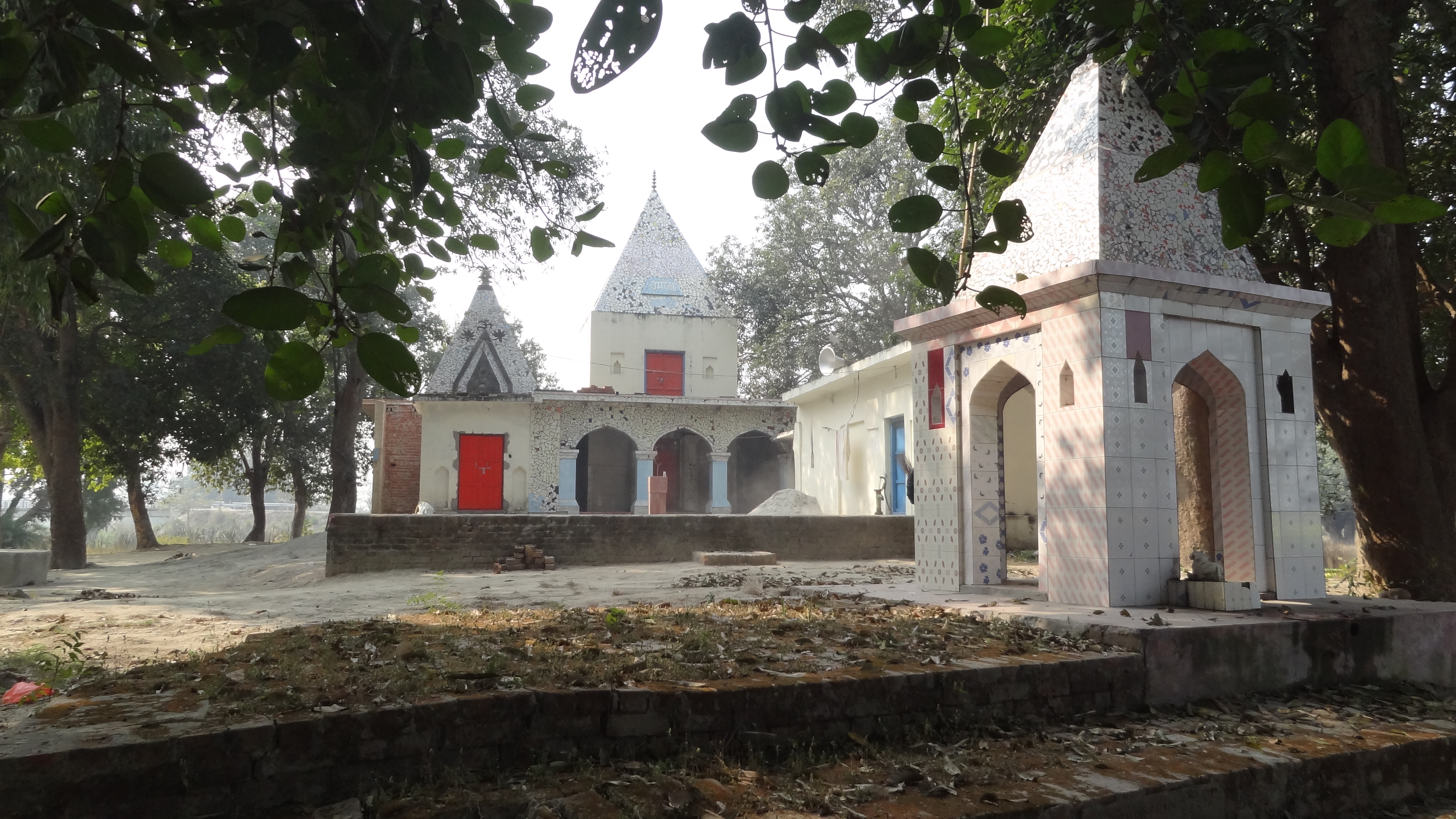
Ramrekha Mandir, Amorha, Basti, Uttar Pradesh, India (रामरेखा मन्दिर - अमोढ़ा)

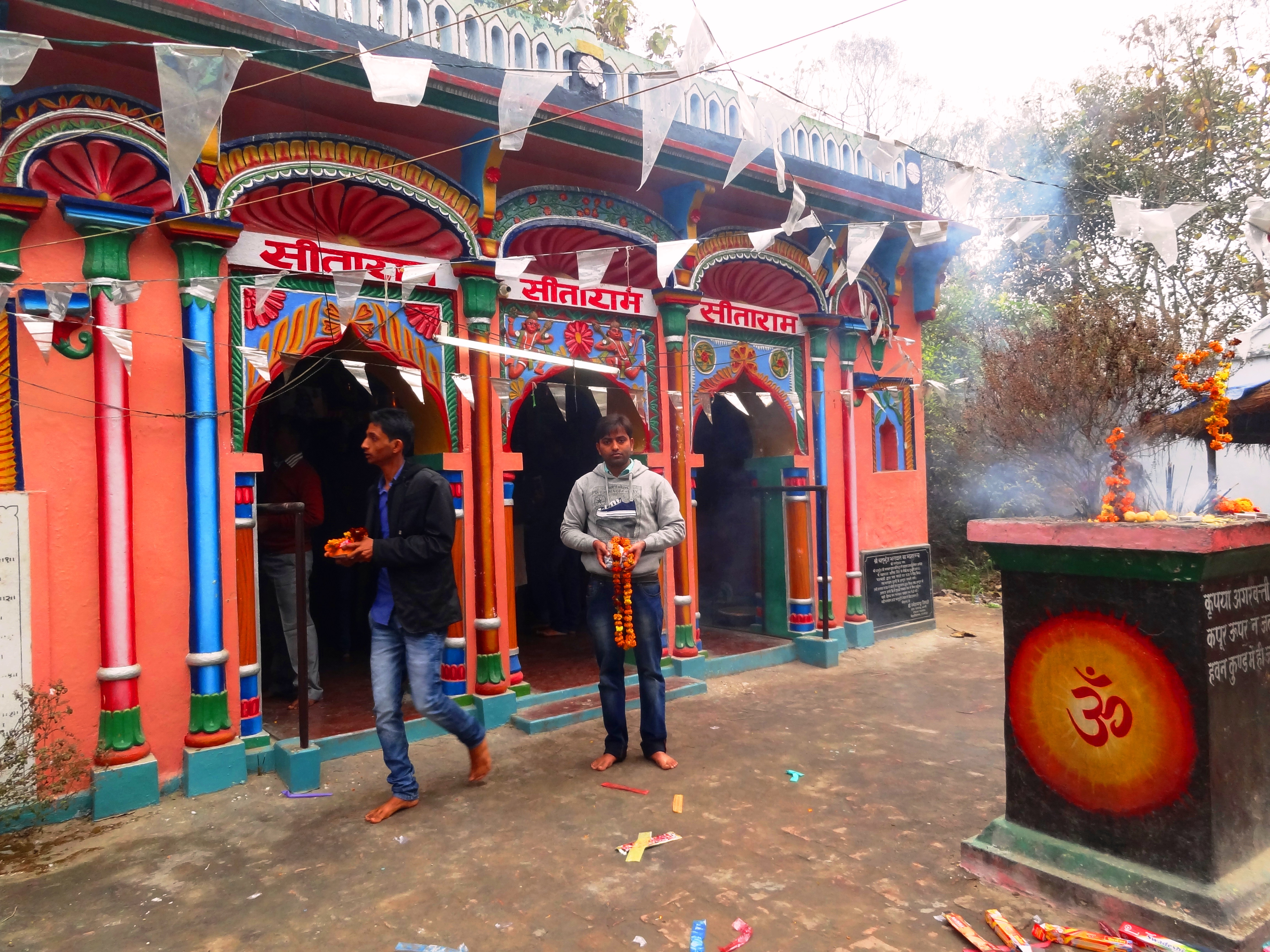
Chaturbhuji Mandir, Amorha, Basti, Uttar Pradesh

== History ==
Amorha was ruled by the indigenous Bhar and Suryavanshi Kshatriya Rajputs drove out the Bhars by force and founded an estate known as the Amorha Raj.

Raja Zalim Singh was the King of Amorha. He was an Rajput of suryavanshi clan . He was married to sister of Raja uday pratap naryan singh of Nagar Raj(of Gautam Rajputs). Raja Zalim Singh along with the Nawab of Oudh fought against the British imperialists for India's Freedom Struggle. On 13th Aug 1857, the British imperialists realised it was very difficult to establish their rule in Amorha due to fierce resistance by the Raja. This forced the British officer, Col. Robert Craft, to back off from the region on 2nd Mar 1858. The last queen of Amorha, and the wife of Raja Zalim Singh, Rani Talash Kanwar(gautam rani), took arms against the British and was killed in a bloody battle.

Raja Zalim Singh was a brave Indian freedom fighter. He repulsed all British invasions in his region. He defended his territory against the British with utmost valour for a long time until one day when he was taken off guard and surrounded by the British army. He managed to escape via a secret tunnel and continued to fight guerrilla warfare against the British.

== Demographics ==
As of 2011, Amorha Khas had a population of 5,977, in 1,009 households. This population was 49.1% male (2,933) and 50.9% female (3,044). The 0–6 age group numbered 1,139 (553 male and 586 female), making up 19.1% of the total population. 924 residents were members of Scheduled Castes, or 15.5% of the total.

The 1991 census recorded Amorha Khas (as "Amora Khas") as having a population of 3,326, in 608 households.

The 1981 census recorded Amorha Khas as having a population of 2,701, in 562 households.

The 1961 census recorded Amorha Khas as comprising 15 hamlets, with a total population of 1,965 people (980 male and 985 female), in 371 households and 357 physical houses. The area of the village was given as 1,523 acres and it had a post office at that point.

== Famous places ==
Amorha Khas is situated at a distance of 41 km from the district headquarters. Its old name was Ambodha, and it was once a province (state) of Bhar Rajwansh and later dSuryavanshi Rajput Raja Zalim Singh. Zalim Singh's Mahal is here, Old wall of mahal is still there with the mark of a bullet used by the English. Also a temple Ramrekha Mandir is here.

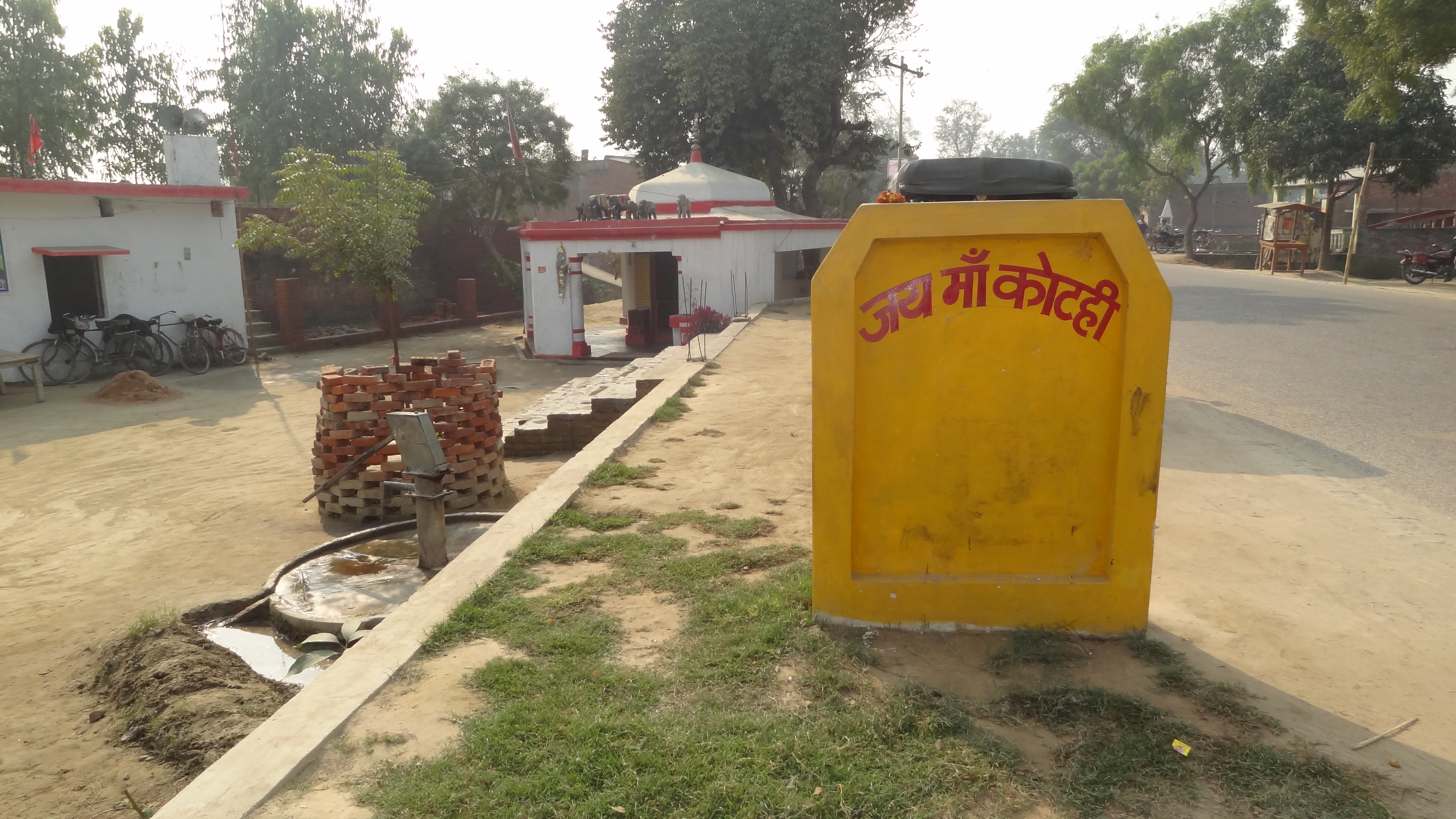
Kotahi Mandir, Amorha, (Basti), Uttar Pradesh

== Infrastructure ==
As of 2011, Amorha Khas had 2 primary schools; it did not have any healthcare facilities. Drinking water was provided by hand pump; there were no public toilets. The village did not have a post office or public library; there was at least some access to electricity for all purposes.

== Gallery ==
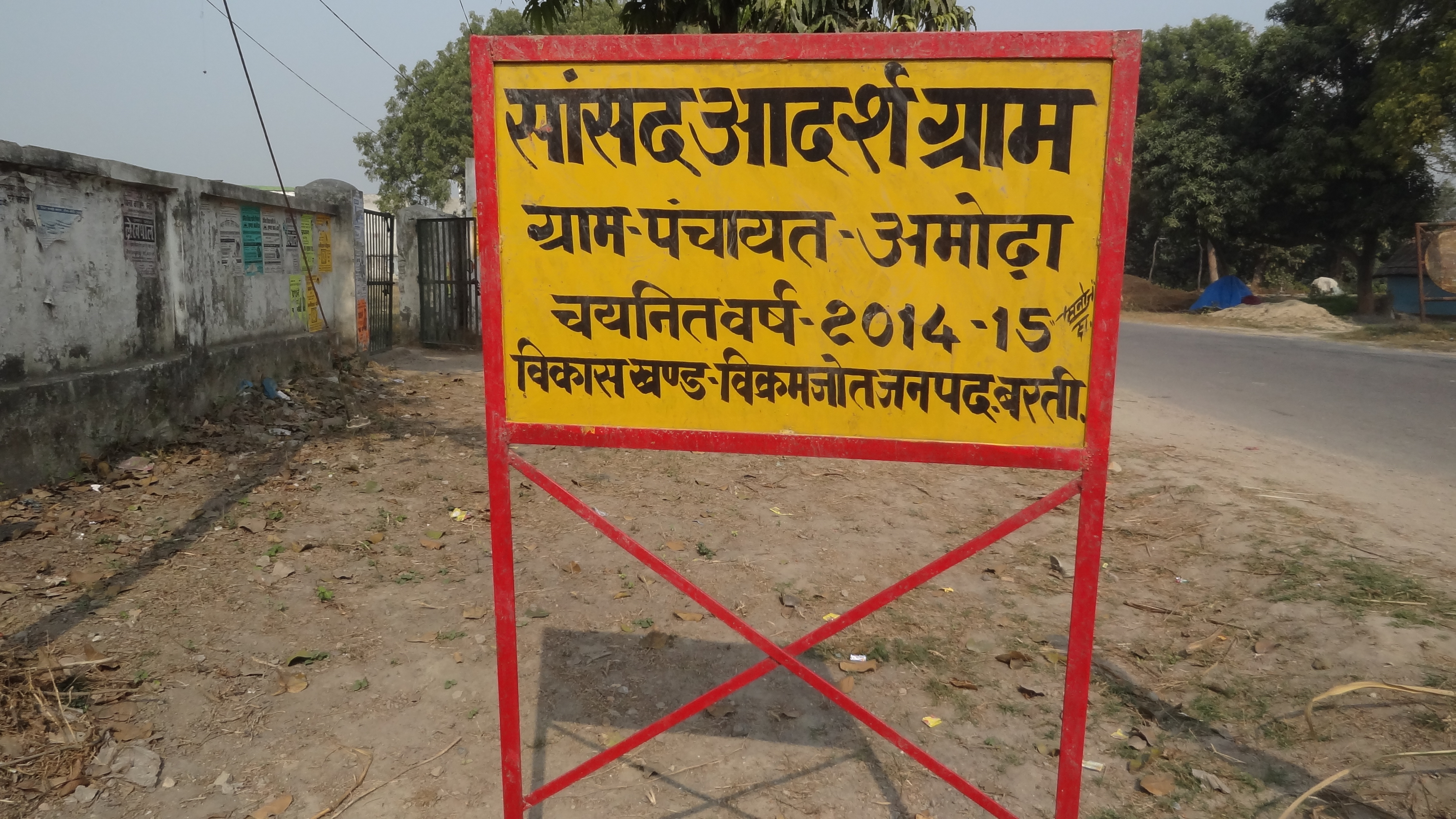
Sansad Aadarsh Gram Amorha Khas

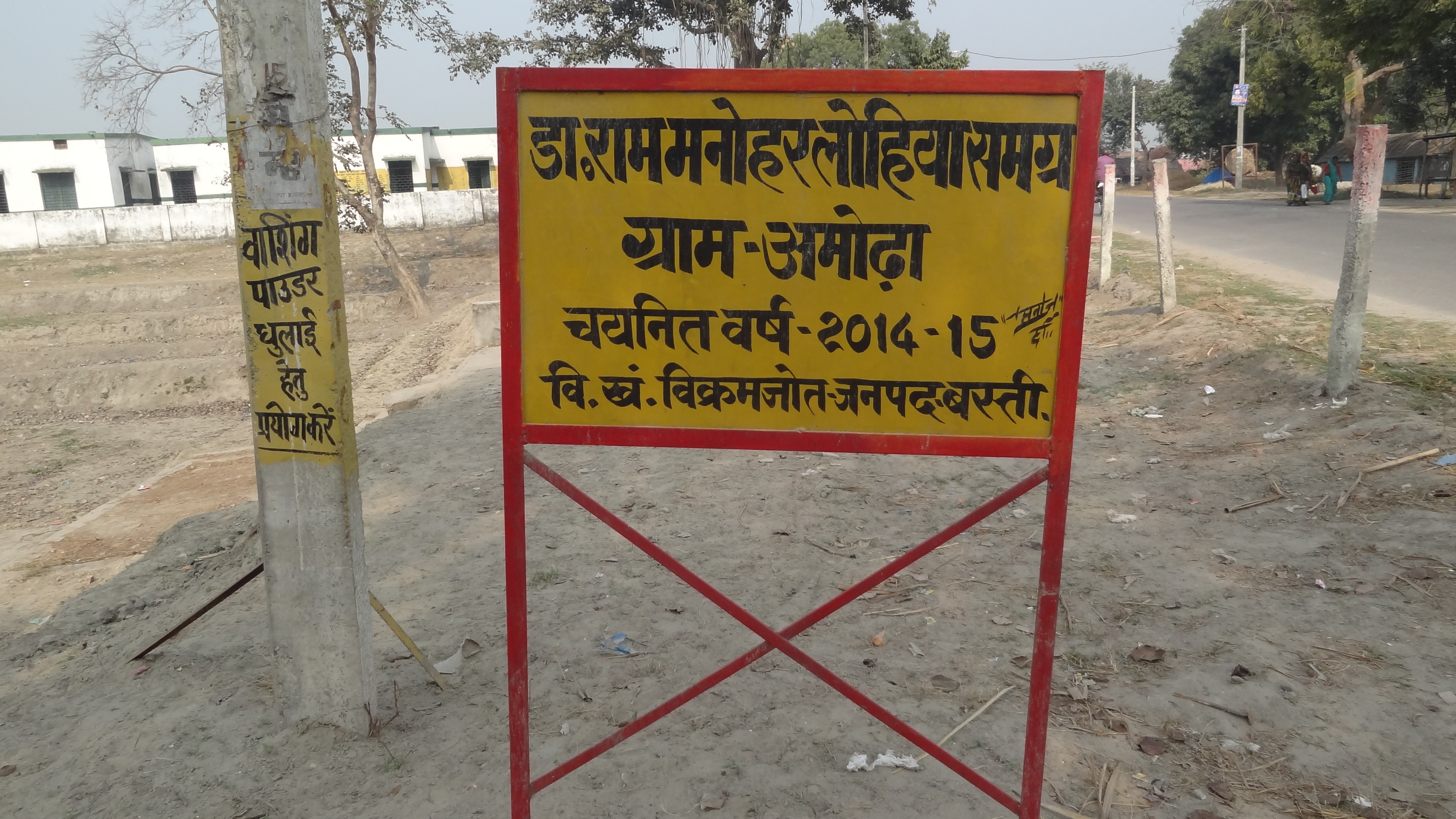
Lohia Samagra Gram Amorha Khas
