= Deen Dayal Upadhyay Gorakhpur University =

University in Uttar Pradesh, India

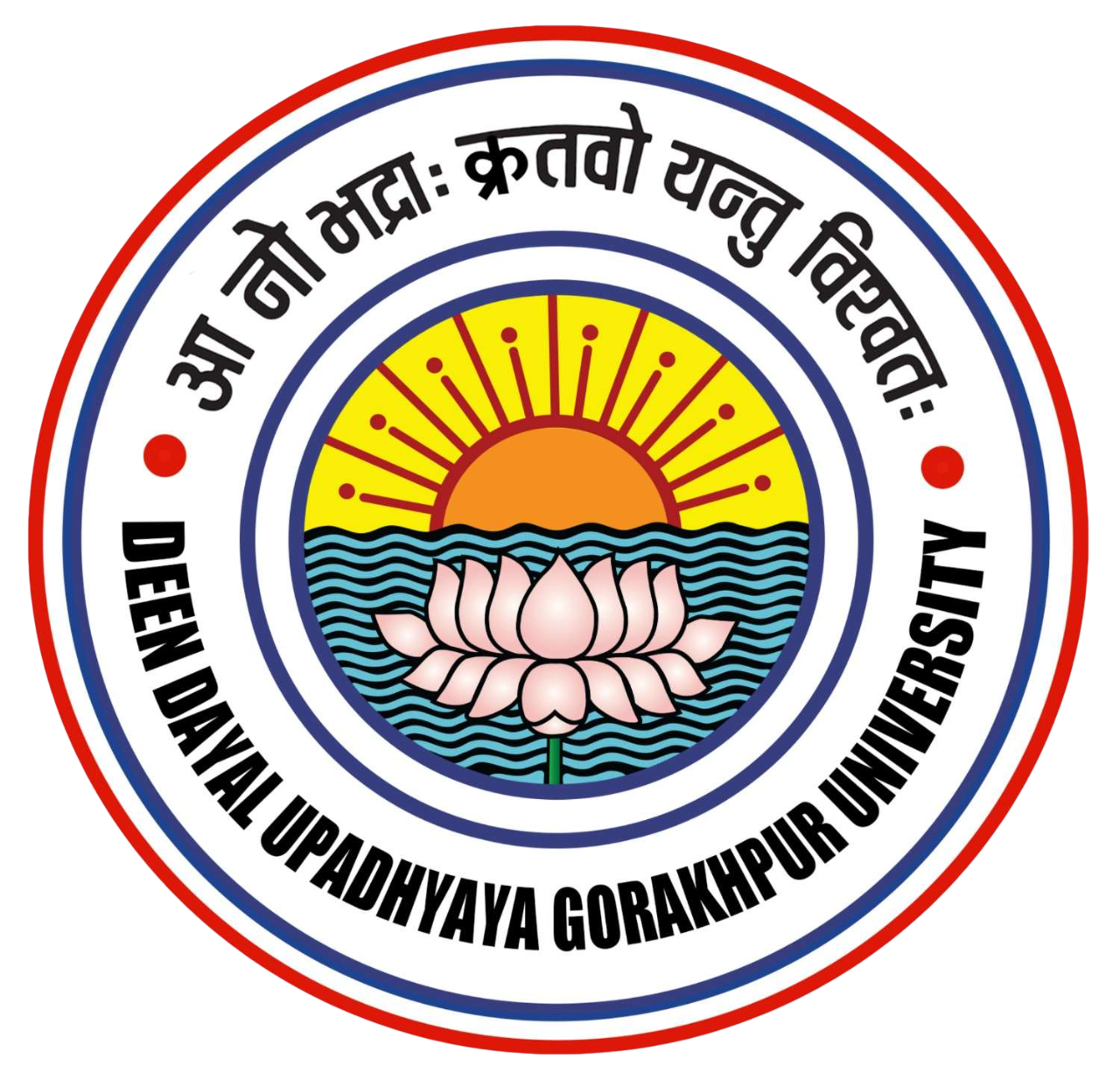
- Motto: IAST: Ā no bhadrāḥ kratavo yantu viśvataḥ
- Motto in English: "Let noble thoughts come to us from all directions"
- Type: State University
- Established: 1950 (76 years ago)
- Accreditation: NAAC A++
- Affiliations: UGC; NAAC
- Chancellor: Governor of Uttar Pradesh
- Vice-Chancellor: Krishna Pal Singh
- Location: Gorakhpur, Uttar Pradesh, India; 26.7481°N 83.3808°E
- Campus: Urban, over 190.96 acres (77.28 ha)
- Website: ddugu.ac.in

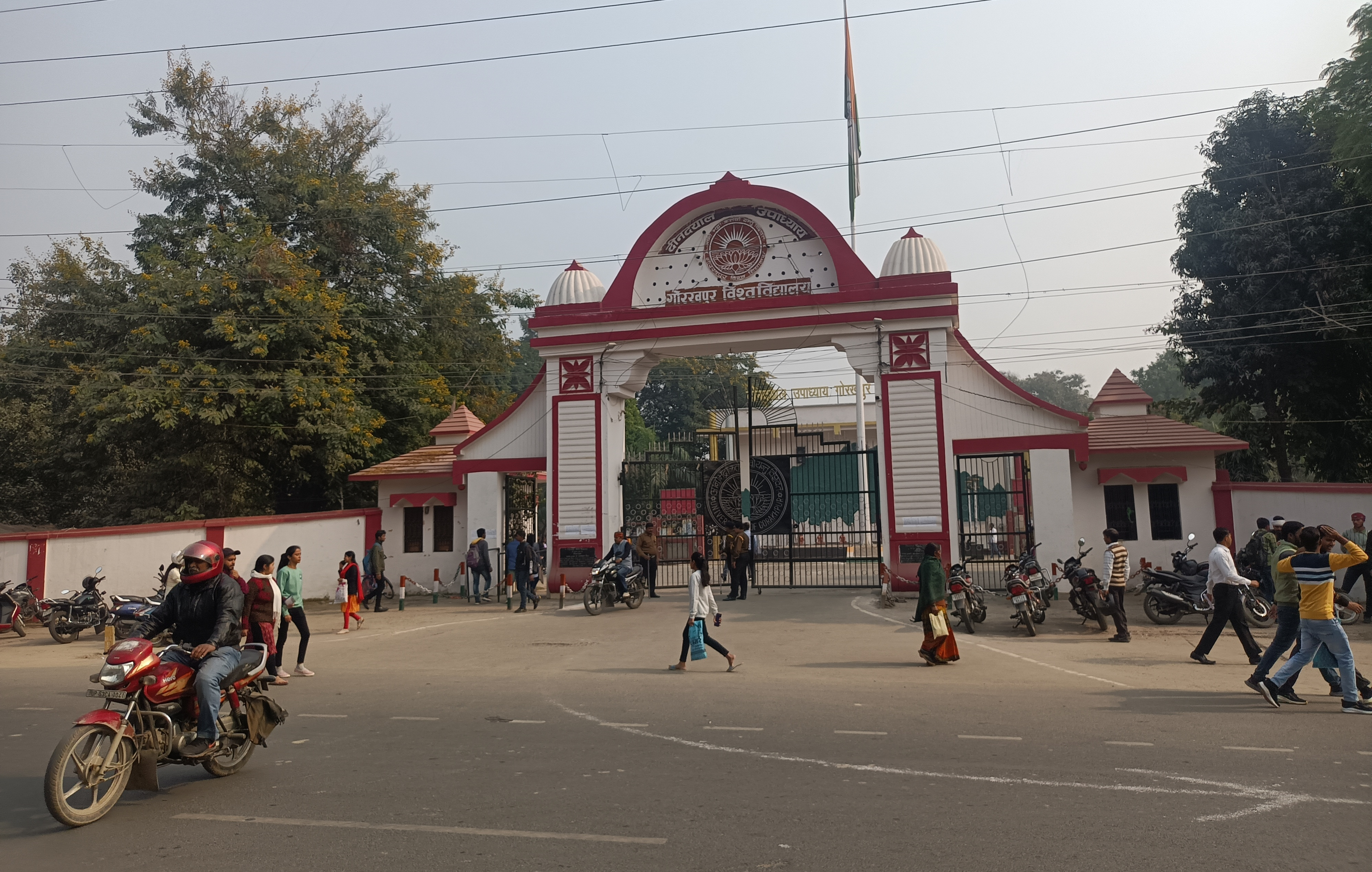
Main Gate of DDUGU

Deen Dayal Upadhyay Gorakhpur University (Informally known as Gorakhpur University) is located in Gorakhpur, Uttar Pradesh. The University of Gorakhpur is a teaching and residential-cum-affiliating University. It has entered the league of top five state universities of the country by achieving NAAC Grade A++ rank. It has become the first university of the state to get a 3.78 score. It is about two kilometres (1.2 mi). from the downtown to the east and almost walking distance from railway station to the south.

== History ==
Although the idea of residential University at Gorakhpur was first mooted by C. J. Rao, the then Principal of St. Andrews College, then under Agra University, who initiated post-graduate and undergraduate science teaching in his college, the idea got crystallized and took concrete shape by the untiring efforts of S. N. M.Tripathi. The proposal was accepted in principle by the first Chief Minister of U.P., Gobind Ballabh Pant, but it was only in 1956 that the university came into existence by an act passed by the U.P. Legislature. It actually started functioning since 1 September 1957, when the faculties of Arts, Commerce, Law and Education were started. In the following year, 1958, the faculty of science came into being. Faculties of Engineering, Medicine and Agriculture came into existence in later years. Mahant Digvijay Nath also made valuable contribution in the formation of the university. University of Gorakhpur is a teaching and residential-cum-affiliating University. It is situated at a distance of about 2 kilometers from the downtown to the east and almost walking distance from railway station to the south. The idea got crystallized and took concrete shape by the untiring efforts of S. N. M. Tripathi. The proposal was accepted in principle by the Chief Minister Govind Ballabh Pant, but it was only in 1956 that the university came into existence by an act passed by the U.P. Legislature. It actually started functioning since 1 September 1957, when the faculties of Arts, Commerce, Law and Education were started.

== Research areas ==
=== Department of Physics ===
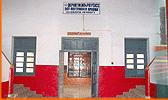
Department of Physics, Majithiya Block

In the beginning, research facilities in the field of molecular spectroscopy and the luminescence were developed and a number beginning in the field of semiconductor devices, polymer studies and theoretical studies in the field of exact solutions of Einstein field equations were also carried out. With growing numbers of teaching staff, studies in the field of crystal structure using X-ray techniques, investigations in the field of liquid crystals and biomolecules, experimental studies in solar physics and categorization of stars, studies of stellar matter particularly black holes and galactic clusters were undertaken. A strong in the field of supersonic conductors, dielectric polarization, absorption and dispersion studies and rare earth oxides were developed in the mid-1970s. Studies in the field of thin-film solar energy conversion devices, organic semiconductors and currently multilayer and nanostructure materials and devices have been developed.

A group in biophysics is studying transcription in DNA molecules and junction of these molecules. This group is also carrying out conformal mapping of biomolecules using X-ray techniques and NMR investigations. Another group in the field of Particle Physics is also active and is engaged in collaborative programme with CERN, Germany. Most of the faculty members after having their training in the country have worked in renowned research laboratories and centres of theoretical studies abroad.

=== Department of Mathematics & Statistics ===
As of 2011 Remy Denis, president of the All India Catholic Union, was a professor in the Department of Mathematics. Research is being done in the fields of Theory of Relativity, Differential Geometry, Fluid Dynamics, Special Functions, Summability Theory, Functional Analysis, Differentiable Manifolds, Number Theory, and Graph Theory and in Statistics, Bayesian inference, Life Testing, Reliability Theory Demography, etc. The Department of Mathematics and Statistics has made great strides.

=== Department of Chemistry ===
Department of Chemistry (Pant Bhavan)

The Department of Chemistry was established in 1958 with S.C. Tripathi as its founder member and Mehrotra (April 1958 to July 1962) as its first head. R.P.Rastogi was appointed Professor & Head of the Chemistry Department in August 1962. He continued to be its Head until 1985, when he was appointed Vice – Chancellor, Banaras Hindu University, Varanasi. Under Rastogi, Department saw tremendous growth in chemical research and education activity and earned international fame in various areas including: Solid State Processes and Rocket Propulsion, Thermodynamics of Mixtures, Thermodynamics of Irreversible Processes, Non-linear Dynamics just to name a few. Chemistry Department is still very active in chemical research and education to continue its tradition.

== Notable alumni ==
- Hari Shankar Tiwari (Ex-Cabinet Minister & MLA) from Chillupar
- Virendra Pratap Shahi (Ex-MLA) from Lakshmipur
- Afzal Ansari, Bahujan Samaj Party, MP from Ghazipur
- Akhil Chandra Banerjea, virologist, N-BIOS laureate
- Salim Ansari, Ex BSP Rajya Sabha Member
- Ram Govind Chaudhary, leader of the opposition in the Uttar Pradesh Legislative Assembly
- Parichay Das, Bhojpuri-Hindi writer, ex-secretary, Maithili-Bhojpuri Academy, Delhi Govt. and ex-secretary, Hindi Academy, Delhi Govt.
- Shiv Pratap Shukla, 22nd Governor of Himachal Pradesh
- Samaresh Mitra, bio-inorganic chemist, Shanti Swarup Bhatnagar laureate
- Meenakshi Narain, Chair of the Department of Physics at Brown University, contributed to the discovery of top quark in 1995 and Higgs Boson in 2012.
- Jai Prakash Nishad, Member of Parliament, Rajya Sabha from Uttar Pradesh
- Jagdambika Pal, a Bharatiya Janta Party MP from Doomariyaganj
- Mata Prasad Pandey, former speaker of the Uttar Pradesh Assembly.
- Sanjaya Rajaram, agricultural scientist, World Food Prize winner 2014.
- Shakeel Ahmed Samdani, Former Dean and Professor, Faculty of Law, Aligarh Muslim University
- Sabyasachi Sarkar, former senior professor and head, Department of Chemistry, IIT, Kanpur
- Rajnath Singh, Defence Minister of India. Former chief minister of Uttar Pradesh, president of the Bharatiya Janta Party and former home minister of India
- Vir Bahadur Singh, former chief minister of Uttar Pradesh.
- Rajesh Tripathi, a Bharatiya Janata Party MLA from Chillupar
- Chandrapal Singh Yadav, a Samajwadi Party MP from Jhansi
- Kameshwar Nath Singh, a professor and vice-chancellor at Central University of South Bihar.
- Mangala Rai, former DG-ICAR and Secretary DARE
- Pankaj Chaudhary, MOS Ministry of Finance (India)
- Kalpnath Rai, Former MP Lok Sabha, Rajya Sabha
- Satish Chandra Dwivedi, Former Minister of Basic Education Government of Uttar Pradesh
- Harish Dwivedi, Former Lok Sabha MP

== See also ==
- List of universities in India
- Universities and colleges in India
- Education in India
- University Grants Commission (India)
- Siddharth University, Kapilvastu
