= Naresh Chandra Agrawal =

Indian politician

Member of Parliament, Rajya Sabha
- In office May 2012 – March 2018
- Succeeded by: RD Gupta
- Constituency: Uttar Pradesh

Member of Uttar Pradesh Legislative Assembly
- In office 1989–2008
- Preceded by: Uma Tripathi
- Succeeded by: Nitin Agrawal
- Constituency: Hardoi

Personal details
- Born: 1 October 1951 (age 74) Hardoi, Uttar Pradesh, India
- Party: Bharatiya Janata Party (2018 - Present)
- Other political affiliations: Indian National Congress, Bahujan Samaj Party, Samajwadi Party
- Spouse: Manjul Agrawal (wife)
- Children: 1 son & 1 daughter
- Parent(s): S. C. Agarwal (father); Shanti Agarwal (mother)
- Education: University of Lucknow
- Profession: Politician & Lawyer

Naresh Chandra Agrawal is an Indian politician who was a member of the Rajya Sabha in India.

He served as Deputy Chief Minister of Uttar Pradesh for 2 days in 1998. Now he represents the State of Uttar Pradesh and is a member of the BJP (Bharatiya Janata Party) and has been Member of the Legislative Assembly from Hardoi constituency for seven terms.

== Early life and education ==
Naresh Chandra Agrawal was born in Hardoi. He attended the University of Lucknow and attained Bachelor of Laws & Bachelor of Science.

== Political career ==
Agrawal was a MLA for seven terms from 1980 to 2012 except 1985 to 1989. As an MLA, he represented the Hardoi constituency. He was a member of the Samajwadi Party political party till 12 March 2018, till he joined the Bharatiya Janta Party. Till 1997, he was a member of Indian National Congress.

In 1997, he was forming member of Akhil Bharatiya Loktantrik Congress along with Jagdambika Pal, Rajeev Shukla and Shyam Sunder Sharma, Bacha Pathak and became Minister of Power in Kalyan Singh, Ram Prakash Gupta and Rajnath Singh governments. He was also Minister of Tourism in Mulayam Singh Yadav Government from 2003 to 2004. He was elected to Rajya Sabha in March 2010 and resigned in March 2012. He was elected again in 2012 from SP .

On 12 March 2018, Agarwal left the Samajwadi Party and joined the Bharatiya Janata Party after the party chose actress Jaya Bachchan as its candidate for election to the Rajya Sabha. Agarwal immediately got involved in controversy after he made derogatory remarks towards Bachchan's career choice. This wasn't the first time Agarwal made demeaning comments about women. Then Samajwadi Party (SP) MLA Naresh Agarwal sparked a controversy over the brutal Mumbai gang-rape, saying that women needed to pay attention to their clothes to avoid being raped. Agarwal also said that women should not be too influenced by television. His comments sparked extreme controversy and was condemned by the media & the victims' family.

== Controversy ==
Party (SP) MLA Naresh Agarwal sparked a controversy over the brutal Mumbai gang-rape, saying that women needed to pay attention to their clothes to avoid being raped. Agarwal also said that women should not be too influenced by television.

Reacting to the verdict, the mother of the telephone operator, stated, "They deserved death. If there was any harsher punishment than this, their crimes would merit that too. This crime is a blot on society. If rapists like them are set free, it will only encourage molesters and rapists, and send a wrong message to society. Also, it is necessary that equal urgency is shown in all rape and molestation cases. This incident has changed our lives. We live in a locality where word spreads very fast. Some of our neighbours have made our lives hell. They taunt us when we pass. While she has been struggling to overcome the trauma, the local boys have not been letting her do that. She is often chased by youths in the area. When we venture out for family functions, we feel the difference in our relatives' approach towards us." She also added that the quick conviction was only due to the proximity of the 2014 general elections.

In July 2017, Agarwal courted controversy by associating Hindu Gods with alcohol, while speaking on the issue of mob violence related with cow protection in the Rajya Sabha. The comments were removed from records as well the house was adjourned. Agarwal defended himself by saying that he had "not meant to hurt anyone". Deputy Chairperson of the House P. J. Kurien said that the comments "per se derogatory and hurt the sentiments of the majority community and God as it is believed".

== Posts held ==
#	From	To	Position	Comments
01	2012	2018	Member, Rajya Sabha	
02	2010	2012	Member, Rajya Sabha	
03	2007	2012	Member, 15th Legislative Assembly	
04	2004	2007	Minister of Transport, Government of Uttar Pradesh	
05	2003	2004	Minister of Tourism, Government of Uttar Pradesh	
06	2002	2007	Member, 14th Legislative Assembly	
07	1997	2001	Minister of Power, Government of Uttar Pradesh	
08	1996	2002	Member, 13th Legislative Assembly	
09	1993	1995	Member, 12th Legislative Assembly	
10	1991	1992	Member, 11th Legislative Assembly	
11	1989	1991	Member, 10th Legislative Assembly	
12	1980	1985	Member, 08th Legislative Assembly	

== See also ==
- Hardoi (Assembly constituency)
