= Bacha Pathak =

Indian politician

Bacha Pathak was an Indian politician. He was elected to the Uttar Pradesh Legislative Assembly from Bansdih in the 1969, 1974, 1977, 1980, 1991, 1993 and 1996 election as a member of the Indian National Congress. In 1997, he was forming member of Akhil Bharatiya Loktantrik Congress along with Jagdambika Pal, Naresh Agrawal, Rajeev Shukla and Shyam Sunder Sharma and Hari Shankar Tiwari. Bacha Pathak remained Cabinet minister thrice in Uttar Pradesh Government and on various senior positions in the organisation and discharged his duty with responsibility and dedication. He was the Vice President of Indian National Congress Uttar Pradesh unit.
