= Ketakee Singh =

Indian politician

Member of Uttar Pradesh Legislative Assembly
- Incumbent
- Assumed office 2022
- Preceded by: Ram Govind Chaudhary
- Constituency: Bansdih

Personal details
- Party: Bharatiya Janata Party
- Spouse: Shant Swaroop Singh
- Children: 2

Ketakee Singh is an Indian politician. She was elected to Bansdih in the 2022 Uttar Pradesh Legislative Assembly election as a member of the Bharatiya Janata Party. Ketakee Singh defeated the leader of opposition Ram Govind Chaudhary.
