= Debabrata Maiti =

Indian chemist

- Education: Johns Hopkins University; University of Calcutta; IIT Bombay
- Scientific career
- Workplaces: IIT Bombay
- Doctoral advisor: Kenneth Karlin

Debabrata Maiti is an Indian scientist specializing in organometallic chemistry and bioinspired catalysis who serves as a professor of chemistry at the Indian Institute of Technology Bombay, Mumbai. He was awarded the Shanti Swarup Bhatnagar Prize, the prestigious Indian national award for excellence in scientific research, for Chemical Sciences for the year 2022 for his significant contributions to developing transition metal catalysis for transforming organic molecules to prepare value-added materials by site-selective functionalization, leading impact on agrochemicals and pharmaceuticals industry.

== Education and career ==
Debabrata Maiti obtained a B.Sc. degree in chemistry from Ramakrishna Mission Vidyamandira of University of Calcutta in 2001, secured an M.Sc. degree in chemistry from IIT Bombay in 2003 and a Ph.D. degree from Johns Hopkins University in 2008 under the supervision of Kenneth D. Karlin. He spent two years as a post-doctoral fellow at Massachusetts Institute of Technology with Stephen L. Buchwald. Returning to India he joined IIT Bombay as an assistant professor in chemistry in 2010 where he is currently serving as professor of chemistry.

== Awards and recognition ==
Besides the Shanti Swarup Bhatnagar Award, Maiti has been conferred several awards and recognition including the following:

- Fellow of Indian Academy of Sciences (2023)
- Prof. S. C. Bhattacharya Excellence Award in Pure Sciences (2022)
- Sun Pharma Science Foundation Research Award (2021)
- Professor P K Bose Memorial Award (2021)
- Chemical Research Society of India Bronze Medal (2021)
- Fellow of the Royal Society of Chemistry (2019)
- NASI Scopus Young Scientists Award (2019)
- OPPI Young Scientist (2019)
- Associate Editor, The Journal of Organic Chemistry
