= Samaresh =

Samaresh is a given name. Notable people with the name include:

- Samaresh Basu (1924–1988), Indian Bengali writer
- Samaresh Bhattacharya (born 1960), Indian chemist and professor
- Samaresh Jung (born 1970), Indian sport shooter
- Samaresh Majumdar (1944–2023), Indian Bengali writer
- Samaresh Mitra (born 1937), Indian chemist
- Samaresh Routray (born 1979), Indian film actor, producer, and television personality
