= Bansdih Assembly constituency =

Constituency of the Uttar Pradesh legislative assembly in India

Coordinates: 25.88°N 84.22°E

Bansdih
- Constituency No. 362 for the Uttar Pradesh Legislative Assembly

Constituency details
- Country: India
- Region: North India
- State: Uttar Pradesh
- District: Ballia
- Reservation: None

Member of Legislative Assembly
- 18th Uttar Pradesh Legislative Assembly
- Incumbent Ketakee Singh
- Party: Bharatiya Janata Party
- Elected year: 2022
- Preceded by: Ram Govind Chaudhary

Bansdih is a constituency of the Uttar Pradesh Legislative Assembly covering the city of Bansdih in the Ballia district of Uttar Pradesh, India. It is one of five assembly constituencies in the Salempur Lok Sabha constituency. Since 2008, this assembly constituency is numbered 362 amongst 403 constituencies.

== Members of Legislative Assembly ==
Year	Member	Party
1967	Baijnath Singh	Bharatiya Jana Sangh
1969	Bacha Pathak	Indian National Congress
1974	Bacha Pathak	Indian National Congress
1977	Bacha Pathak	Indian National Congress
1980	Bacha Pathak	Indian National Congress (Indira)
1985	Vijay Lakshmi	Janata Party
1989	Vijay Lakshmi	Janata Dal
1991	Bacha Pathak	Indian National Congress
1993	Bacha Pathak	Indian National Congress
1996	Bacha Pathak	Indian National Congress
2002	Ram Govind Chaudhary	Samajwadi Janata Party (Rashtriya)
2007	Shiv Shankar	Bahujan Samaj Party
2012	Ram Govind Chaudhary	Samajwadi Party
2017	Ram Govind Chaudhary	Samajwadi Party
2022	Ketakee Singh	Bharatiya Janata Party

== Election results ==
=== 2027 ===
2027 Uttar Pradesh Legislative Assembly election: Bansdih
Party	Candidate	Votes	%	±%
INDIA				
NDA				
BSP				
NOTA	None of the above			
Majority				
Turnout				
gain from		Swing		

=== 2022 ===
2022 Uttar Pradesh Legislative Assembly election: Bansdih
Party	Candidate	Votes	%	±%
BJP	Ketakee Singh	103,305	47.67	
SP	Ram Govind Chaudhary	81,953	37.82	+13.43
BSP	Manti	10,854	5.01	−13.45
VIP	Ajay Shankar	7,650	3.53	
INC	Puneet	4,354	2.01	
CPI	Lakshman	1,983	0.92	
NOTA	None of the above	2,004	0.92	+0.48
Majority		21,352	9.85	+9.05
Turnout		216,698	53.08	−1.39
BJP gain from SP		Swing		

=== 2017 ===
Samajwadi Party member Ram Govind Chaudhary was the MLA, who won in the 2017 Uttar Pradesh Legislative Assembly election defeating Independent candidate Ketakee Singh by a margin of 1,687 votes.

2017 Uttar Pradesh Legislative Assembly election: Bansdih
Party	Candidate	Votes	%	±%
SP	Ram Govind Chaudheri	51,201	24.39	
Independent	Ketakee Singh	49,514	23.59	
SBSP	Arvind Rajbhar	40,234	19.17	
BSP	Shivshankar	38,745	18.46	
LKD	Niraj Singh Gudu	10,315	4.91	
Independent	Arvind	6,080	2.9	
Independent	Jawahir	2,718	1.29	
NOTA	None of the above	918	0.44	
Majority		1,687	0.8	
Turnout		209,933	54.47	
