= Hardoi Assembly constituency =

Constituency of the Uttar Pradesh legislative assembly in India

Hardoi
- Constituency No. 156 for the Uttar Pradesh Legislative Assembly

Constituency details
- Country: India
- Region: North India
- State: Uttar Pradesh
- District: Hardoi
- Total electors: 340,302 (2012)
- Reservation: None

Member of Legislative Assembly
- 18th Uttar Pradesh Legislative Assembly
- Incumbent Nitin Agrawal
- Party: Bharatiya Janata Party
- Elected year: 2022

Hardoi Assembly constituency is one of the 403 constituencies of the Uttar Pradesh Legislative Assembly, India. It is a part of the Hardoi district and one of the five assembly constituencies in the Hardoi Lok Sabha constituency. First election in this assembly constituency was held in 1952 after the "DPACO (1951)" (delimitation order) was passed in 1951. After the "Delimitation of Parliamentary and Assembly Constituencies Order" was passed in 2008, the constituency was assigned identification number 156.

== Wards / Areas ==
Extent of Hardoi Assembly constituency is KCs Hardoi, Bawan, Sharah Daxin & Hardoi MB of Hardoi Tehsil.

== Members of the Legislative Assembly ==
Year	Member	Party
1952	Kinder Lal	Indian National Congress
1952	Chandra Has	Indian National Congress
1957	Bulaqi Ram	Indian National Congress
1957	Mahesh Singh	Indian National Congress
1962	Mahesh Singh	Indian National Congress
1967	Dharmgaj Singh	Independent
1969	Asha Singh	Indian National Congress
1974	Shrish Chandra	Indian National Congress
1977	Dharmgaj Singh	Indian National Congress
1980	Naresh Chandra Agrawal	Indian National Congress (I)
1985	Uma Tripathi	Indian National Congress
1989	Naresh Chandra Agrawal	Independent
1991	Naresh Chandra Agrawal	Indian National Congress
1993	Naresh Chandra Agrawal	Indian National Congress
1996	Naresh Chandra Agrawal	Indian National Congress
2002	Naresh Chandra Agrawal	Samajwadi Party
2007	Naresh Chandra Agrawal	Samajwadi Party
2012	Nitin Agrawal	Samajwadi Party
2017	Nitin Agrawal	Samajwadi Party
2022	Nitin Agrawal	Bharatiya Janata Party

== Election results ==
=== 2027 ===
2027 Uttar Pradesh Legislative Assembly election: Hardoi
Party	Candidate	Votes	%	±%
INDIA				
NDA				
BSP				
NOTA	None of the above			
Majority				
Turnout				
gain from		Swing		

=== 2022 ===
2022 Uttar Pradesh Legislative Assembly election: Hardoi
Party	Candidate	Votes	%	±%
BJP	Nitin Agarwal	126,750	53.19	▲12.98
SP	Anil Verma	84,339	35.39	▼7.04
BSP	Shobhit Pathak	20,573	8.63	▼4.67
NOTA	None of the above	1,740	0.73	▼0.24
Majority		42,411	17.8	▲15.58
Turnout		238,295	57.52	▼1.01
BJP gain from SP		Swing		

=== 2017 ===
2017 Uttar Pradesh Legislative Assembly Election: Hardoi
Party	Candidate	Votes	%	±%
SP	Nitin Agarwal	97,735	42.43	
BJP	Raja Bux Singh	92,626	40.21	
BSP	Dharmveer Singh	30,628	13.3	
NOTA	None of the above	2,203	0.97	
Majority		5,109	2.22	
Turnout		230,361	58.53	

=== 2012 ===
16th Vidhan Sabha

2012 General Elections: Hardoi
Party	Candidate	Votes	%	±%
SP	Nitin Agrawal	110,063	54.6	−
BJP	Raja Bux Singh	66,381	32.93	−
INC	Sukh Sagar Mishra	16,011	7.94	−
	Remainder 10 candidates	9,131	4.53	−
Majority		43,682	21.67	−
Turnout		201,586	59.24	−
SP hold		Swing		

== See also ==
- Hardoi district
- Hardoi Lok Sabha constituency
- Sixteenth Legislative Assembly of Uttar Pradesh
- Uttar Pradesh Legislative Assembly
- Vidhan Bhawan
