= Anindya Das =

Indian physicist

- Education: Indian Institute of Science
- Awards: Shanti Swarup Bhatnagar Prize for Science and Technology (2022)
- Scientific career
- Fields: Physics
- Workplaces: Indian Institute of Science

Anindya Das is an Indian physicist who works in experimental condensed matter physics. He was awarded one of the twelve across seven scientific fields Shanti Swarup Bhatnagar Prizes for Science and Technology for the year 2022 in Physical Sciences, a prize awarded to a scientist under 45 years of age.

Das completed his B.Sc. from Ramakrishna Mission Vidyamandira under Calcutta University and M.Sc. and Ph.D. from Indian Institute of Science. He held a postdoctoral position at Weizmann Institute before joining the Indian Institute of Science, where he is currently an associate professor.
