= Sabyasachi Sarkar =

Indian chemist

- সব্যসাচী সরকার
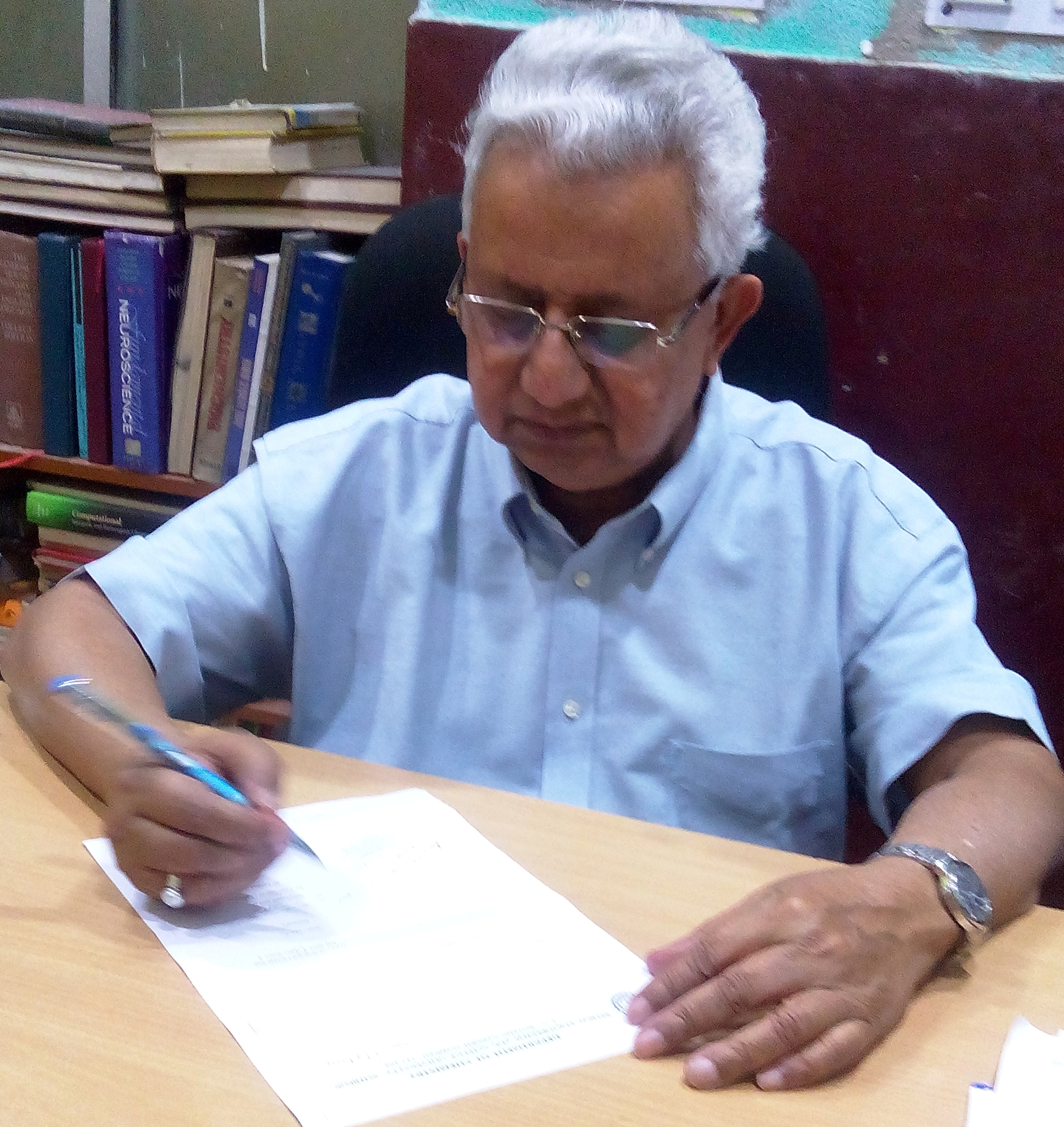
- Born: 17 May 1947 (age 79); Jamtara, India
- Education: Ramakrishna Mission Vidyamandira, Rajabazar Science College, University of Calcutta, Gorakhpur University
- Scientific career
- Fields: Bio inorganic chemistry, nano science
- Workplaces: IIT Kanpur; Indian Institute of Engineering Science and Technology, Shibpur
- Website: home.iitk.ac.in/~abya

Sabyasachi Sarkar (born 17 May 1947) is an Indian chemist. He has worked with functional models related to hyperthermophilic to mesophilic metalloproteins enriching bioinorganic chemistry. A Replica of a Fishy Enzyme and the reduced xanthine oxidase also have been made. Inhibition patterns in the Michaelis complex of low molecular weight hepatic sulfite oxidase model complex have been exhibited. Based on functional mimicking of a series of molybdoenzymes he showed that the even in model enzymatic oxotransfer reactions the participation of similar enzyme-susbrate (E-S) complex is a real entity. Such a chemical spices (E-S) responds to spontaneous intramolecular oxidative addition and reductive elimination to complete the oxotransfer reaction. Such a reaction differs from conventional chemical oxotransfer reaction where the reaction between the starting reactants happens in Eyring activated complex. He demonstrated that carbon dioxide molecule does bind to magnesium in chlorophyll in photosynthesis as proposed by R. M. Willstätter one-hundred years ago and modeled hydrogenase captioned as better than nature. The rare reaction of a Cu(II) complex with aerial oxygen to generate superoxide anion and Cu(III) has been shown addressing the native SOD reaction. Similarly the aspect of copper-molybdenum antagonism in ruminant animals have been investigated. His research has shown the architectural marvel in silk cocoon with the natural thermostatic and humidity control with preferential oxygen gating inside cocoon as green house architecture. He proposed a new magneto reception mechanism for nocturnal moth in sensing the Earth's magnetic field to navigate with a stable pool of carbon-centric free radicals along with ferromagnetic components. He extended the work on nano carbon and developed cheap sources of water soluble nano carbon including naturally formed graphene oxide from low grade coal. These are used in the growth of young plants as promoters to slowly release micro nutrients and adsorbed water. He explored these to explore bio-imaging and demonstrating that non-toxic carbon nano onion can cross blood–brain barrier to carry drug as cargo and can be effectively be excreted from the body. The utility of such nano carbon to control mosquito breeding in preventing mosquito vectors of infectious diseases and the use of reduced graphene oxide to prevent hospital pathogens have been demonstrated. On the environment aspect the presence of damaged floating carbon nano tubes in aerosols is shown to contribute global warming, winter smog and elevating breathing problem. He demonstrated the adverse effect of soap and detergent discharge near tube wells in releasing arsenic and fluoride contaminated water. He also mapped the degradation of a heritage monument, the Taj Mahal.

== Early life and education ==
Prof. Sabysachi Sarkar hails from the family of legal advisor of the local king was born in Birbhum (meaning forest land) district, West Bengal in the Zaminder house of his maternal grandparent. His early education came from St. Xavier's College and Ramakrishna Mission Vidyamandira, Belurmath. He did a M.Sc. from the prestigious Rajabazar Science College, University of Calcutta at the age of 19. He is the lone living grad student of Acharya Prafulla Chandra Ray as practicing chemist even today. He started his research under Professor Pulin Behari Sarkar in the Rajabazar Science College. After learning analytical-inorganic chemistry he learnt thermodynamics from Professor R.P Rastogi of Gorakhpur University. He pursued aggregates of metal oxides and sulfides of diverse interest from the school of Professor Achim Müller in Germany. He practiced research in diversified field of interest including environment, healthcare science, and conservation.

== Professional life ==
=== Fellowships ===
State, National, CSIR, Indian Chemical Society, INSA Research, Academy of Science, Humboldt, DAAD, Raja Ramanna, Royal Society of Chemistry.

=== Honours ===
Professor R.K. Barua Memorial Lecture; Professor R. D. Desai Medal and Prize; Professor Priyadaranjan Ray Memorial Award; Honorary Professor, Faculty of Science –BHU; Annual Professor Sabyasachi Sarkar endowment lecture at RKM Vidyamandira. Belurmath instituted by former PhD student. Honorary Professor Emeritus, IIEST-Shibpur.

=== Literary work ===
He writes satire on Indian science and other science-based articles in Bengali magazines. His full list of writing are available at his website.
