= Chillupar Assembly constituency =

Assembly constituency in Uttar Pradesh, India

Chillupar
- Constituency No. 328 for the Uttar Pradesh Legislative Assembly

Constituency details
- Country: India
- Region: North India
- State: Uttar Pradesh
- District: Gorakhpur
- Total electors: 4,31,450 (2017)
- Reservation: None

Member of Legislative Assembly
- 18th Uttar Pradesh Legislative Assembly
- Incumbent Rajesh Tripathi
- Party: Bharatiya Janata Party
- Elected year: 2017

Chillupar is a constituency of the Uttar Pradesh Legislative Assembly covering the city of Chillupar in the Gorakhpur district of Uttar Pradesh, India.

Chillupar is one of five assembly constituencies in the Bansgaon Lok Sabha constituency. Since 2008, this assembly constituency is numbered 328 amongst 403 constituencies.

== Members of the Legislative Assembly ==
Year	Member	Party
1957	Kailash Pati	Indian National Congress
1962	Kalp Nath Singh	Praja Socialist Party
1967	Kalp Nath Singh	Indian National Congress
1969	Kalp Nath Singh	Indian National Congress
1974	Bhirgu Nath Chaturvedi	Indian National Congress
1977	Kalp Nath Singh	Janata Party
1980	Bhirgu Nath Chaturvedi	Indian National Congress (I)
1985	Hari Shankar Tiwari	Independent
1989	Hari Shankar Tiwari	Indian National Congress
1991	Hari Shankar Tiwari	Indian National Congress
1993	Hari Shankar Tiwari	Indian National Congress
1996	Hari Shankar Tiwari	All India Indira Congress (T)
2002	Hari Shankar Tiwari	Loktantrik Congress
2007	Rajesh Tripathi	Bahujan Samaj Party
2012	Rajesh Tripathi	Bahujan Samaj Party
2017	Vinay Shankar Tiwari	Bahujan Samaj Party
2022	Rajesh Tripathi	Bharatiya Janata Party

== Election results ==
=== 2027 ===
2027 Uttar Pradesh Legislative Assembly election: Chillupar
Party	Candidate	Votes	%	±%
INDIA				
NDA				
BSP	Asmita Chand			
NOTA	None of the above			
Majority				
Turnout				
gain from		Swing		

=== 2022 ===
2022 Uttar Pradesh Legislative Assembly election: Chillupar
Party	Candidate	Votes	%	±%
BJP	Rajesh Tripathi	96,777	42.49	▲8.53
SP	Vinay Shankar Tiwari	75,132	32.98	▲7.82
BSP	Rajendra Singh	45,729	20.08	▼15.4
ASP(KR)	Poonam Gupta	3,090	1.36	
NOTA	None of the above	1,953	0.86	▼0.29
Majority		21,645	9.51	▲7.99
Turnout		227,784	52.98	▲1.92
BJP gain from BSP		Swing		

=== 2017 ===
Bahujan Samaj Party candidate Vinay Shankar Tiwari, won in last Assembly election of 2017 Uttar Pradesh Legislative Elections by defeating Bharatiya Janta Party candidate Rajesh Tripathi by a margin of 3,359 votes.

2017 Assembly Elections: Chillupar
Party	Candidate	Votes	%	±%
BSP	Vinay Shankar Tiwari	78,177	35.48	
BJP	Rajesh Tripathi	74,818	33.96	
SP	Rambhual Nishad	55,422	25.16	
NISHAD	Yogesh Mani Tiwari	3,241	1.47	
NOTA	None of the above	2,512	1.15	
Majority		3,359	1.52	
Turnout		220,317	51.06	
BSP hold		Swing	▲5.08	

=== 2012 ===
2012 Assembly Elections: Chillupar
Party	Candidate	Votes	%	±%
BSP	Rajesh Tripathi	61,639	30.81	Steady
SP	C P Chand	50,486	25.23	Steady
ABLTC	Hari Shankar Tiwari	45,203	22.59	Steady
BJP	Vijay Kumar	16,042	8.02	Steady
Independent	Narendra	5,648	2.82	Steady
INC	Shyamlal Yadav	4,171	2.08	Steady
IJP	Amarnath Maurya	3,087	1.54	Steady
	Remaining 12 Candidates	13,810	6.90	Steady
Majority		11,153	5.57	Steady
Turnout		2,00,086	49.98	Steady
BSP hold		Swing		
