= Ram Govind Chaudhary =

Indian politician (1953–2026)

Leader of the Opposition, 17th Legislative Assembly of Uttar Pradesh
- In office 27 March 2017 – 10 March 2022
- Chief Minister: Yogi Adityanath
- Preceded by: Gaya Charan Dinkar
- Succeeded by: Akhilesh Yadav

Member of Legislative Assembly of Bansdih
- In office March 2012 – March 2022
- Preceded by: Shiv Shankar
- Succeeded by: Ketaki Singh
- In office February 2002 – May 2007
- Preceded by: Bacha Pathak
- Succeeded by: Shiv Shankar
- Constituency: Bansdih, Ballia

Ministry of Basic Education, Child Development and Nutrition Government of Uttar Pradesh
- In office May 2012 – March 2017
- Chief Minister: Akhilesh Yadav

Member of Legislative Assembly of Chilkahar
- In office June 1991 – December 1992
- Succeeded by: Sangram Singh Yadav
- In office December 1989 – April 1991
- In office March 1985 – November 1989
- In office June 1980 – March 1985
- In office June 1977 – February 1980
- Preceded by: Jagannath Chaudhary
- Constituency: Chilkahar, Ballia

Personal details
- Born: 9 July 1953 Ballia, Uttar Pradesh, India
- Died: 25 September 2026 (aged 73) Lucknow, Uttar Pradesh, India
- Party: Samajwadi Party
- Spouse: Kalawati Devi
- Children: 1
- Education: Gorakhpur University, University of Lucknow
- Profession: Politician, advocate

Ram Govind Chaudhary (9 July 1953 – 25 September 2026) was an Indian politician who was regarded as one of the prominent socialist leaders in the country. He served as the Leader of the Opposition in the Uttar Pradesh Legislative Assembly from 2017 to 2022. He was in charge of Basic Education and Child Nutrition and Development Ministries in previous Samajwadi Party Government of Uttar Pradesh led by Akhilesh Yadav. He was Member of Legislative Assembly of Uttar Pradesh from the Bansdih assembly seat, Ballia.

Chaudhary worked closely with Jayaprakash Narayan and Chandra Shekhar. He was also one of the close associates of Samajwadi Party president Mulayam Singh Yadav.

== Early life and education ==
Chaudhary was born on 9 July 1953 in Gosaipur, Ballia, Uttar Pradesh to Dwarika Choudhary. In 1974, he got a Bachelor of Arts degree from Gorakhpur University, and in 1982, he received a degree in LLB from Lucknow University.

== Political career ==
Chaudhary was MLA for eight terms. From 1977 to 1992 he represented Chilkahar constituency in Ballia of Uttar Pradesh. From 2002, he represented Bansdih (Assembly constituency) in Ballia as a member of the Samajwadi Party. He was also Minister of Horticulture and Food Processing in Mulayam Singh Yadav's cabinet (1990–91) and Minister of Child Development and Nutrition, Basic Education in Mulayam Singh Yadav's cabinet (2003–07) and Akhilesh Yadav's cabinet (2012–17).

From March 2017, he served as Leader of opposition in the Seventeenth Legislative Assembly of Uttar Pradesh, as a leader of the Samajwadi Party.

=== Views ===
In May 2017, Chaudhary was criticized for his views against cow-protection campaigns, arguing that poor Muslims had been affected by cow vigilantism. He also questioned gau raksha activities and referred to the animal sacrifice to goddess Kali.

== Personal life and death ==
Chaudhary was married to Kalawati Devi, and together they had a son. He died in Lucknow on 25 September 2026, at the age of 73.

== Posts held ==
- 1977-1980
  - Member, 7th Legislative Assembly of Uttar Pradesh (First Term)
  - Member, Estimate Committee
- 1980-1985
  - Member, 8th Legislative Assembly of Uttar Pradesh (Second Term)
- 1985-1989
  - Member, 9th Legislative Assembly of Uttar Pradesh (Third Term)
  - Whip, Janata Party Legislature Party
  - Member, Joint Committee on Welfare of Scheduled Caste, Scheduled Tribes and Denotified Tribes
- 1989-1991
  - Member, 10th Legislative Assembly of Uttar Pradesh (Fourth Term)
  - Minister, Horticulture and Food Processing (Mulayam Singh Yadav Cabinet)
  - Member, Joint Committee on Welfare of Scheduled Castes Scheduled Tribes and Denotified Tribes
  - Member, Question & Reference Committee
- 1991-1992
  - Member, 11th Legislative Assembly of Uttar Pradesh (Fifth Term)
- 2002-2007
  - Member, 14th Legislative Assembly of Uttar Pradesh (Sixth Term)
  - Minister, Child Development and Nutrition (Mulayam Singh Yadav Cabinet)
  - Member, Joint Committee on Public Undertakings and Corporations
- 2012-2017
  - Member, 16th Legislative Assembly of Uttar Pradesh (Seventh Term)
  - Minister, Child Development and Nutrition, Basic Education, Social Welfare and Panchayati Raj (Akhilesh Yadav Cabinet)
- 2017-2022
  - Member, 17th Legislative Assembly of Uttar Pradesh (Eighth Term)
  - Leader of Opposition in Legislative Assembly of Uttar Pradesh.
