= Shivananda =

Hindu spiritual leader, disciple of Ramakrishna

Swami Shivananda
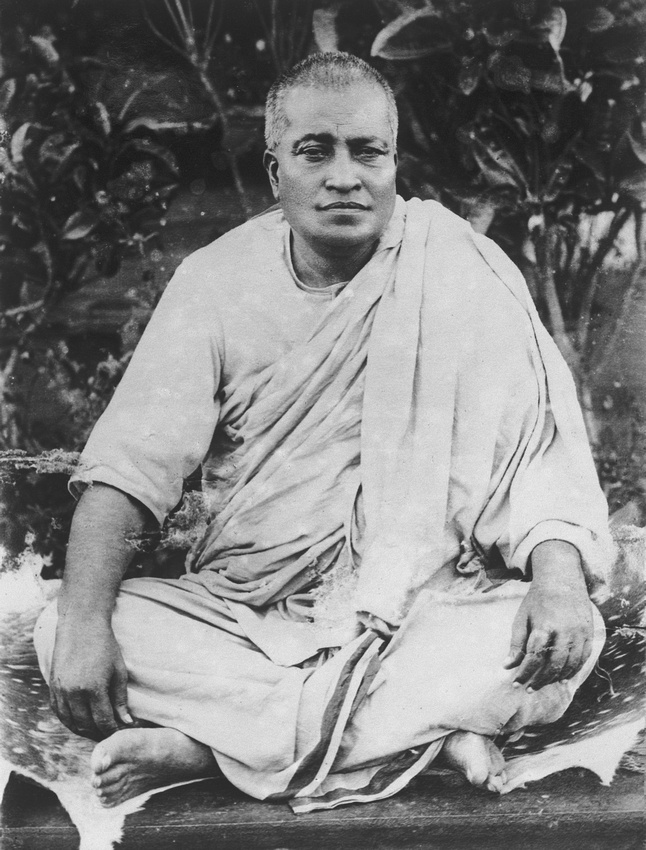

Personal life
- Born: Tarak Nath Ghosal; 16 December 1854 Barasat, Bengal, British India (now West Bengal, India)
- Died: 20 February 1934 (aged 79) Belur Math, Bengal, British India (now West Bengal, India)

Religious life
- Religion: Hinduism
- Order: Ramakrishna Mission
- Philosophy: Advaita Vedanta

Religious career
- Teacher: Sri Ramakrishna
- Predecessor: Swami Brahmananda
- Successor: Swami Akhandananda
- Disciples: Swami Gambhirananda Swami Tapasyananda Swami Ranganathananda Swami Rudrananda Swami Tejasananda Kamala Nehru Swamy Chidbhavananda

Swami Shivananda (1854–1934), born Tarak Nath Ghosal, was a Hindu spiritual leader and a direct disciple of Ramakrishna, who became the second president of the Ramakrishna Mission. His devotees refer to him as Mahapurush Maharaj (Great Soul). Shivananda and Subodhananda were the only direct disciples of Ramakrishna to be filmed. He was a Brahmajnani ("knower of Brahman or the Supreme Being"). Shivananda introduced the celebration of the birthdays of his brother-monks. He was known to have laid the foundation stone of Shri Ramakrishna Temple at Belur Math, which was designed by Vijnanananda.

== Early life ==
Shivananda was born in the village of Barasat in Bengal. His father was Ramakanai Ghoshal, a pious Brahmin who had a substantial income as a lawyer. He was a follower of tantra in his personal life. He and his first wife Vamasundari Devi, the mother of Tarak, provided free board and lodging to twenty-five to thirty poor students. Ramakanai also knew Ramakrishna personally, as he used to visit Dakshineswar on matters of business.

After completing his school studies, Tarak took up a job with Mackinnon Mackenzie in Calcutta to help his father.

=== Ramakrishna's influence ===
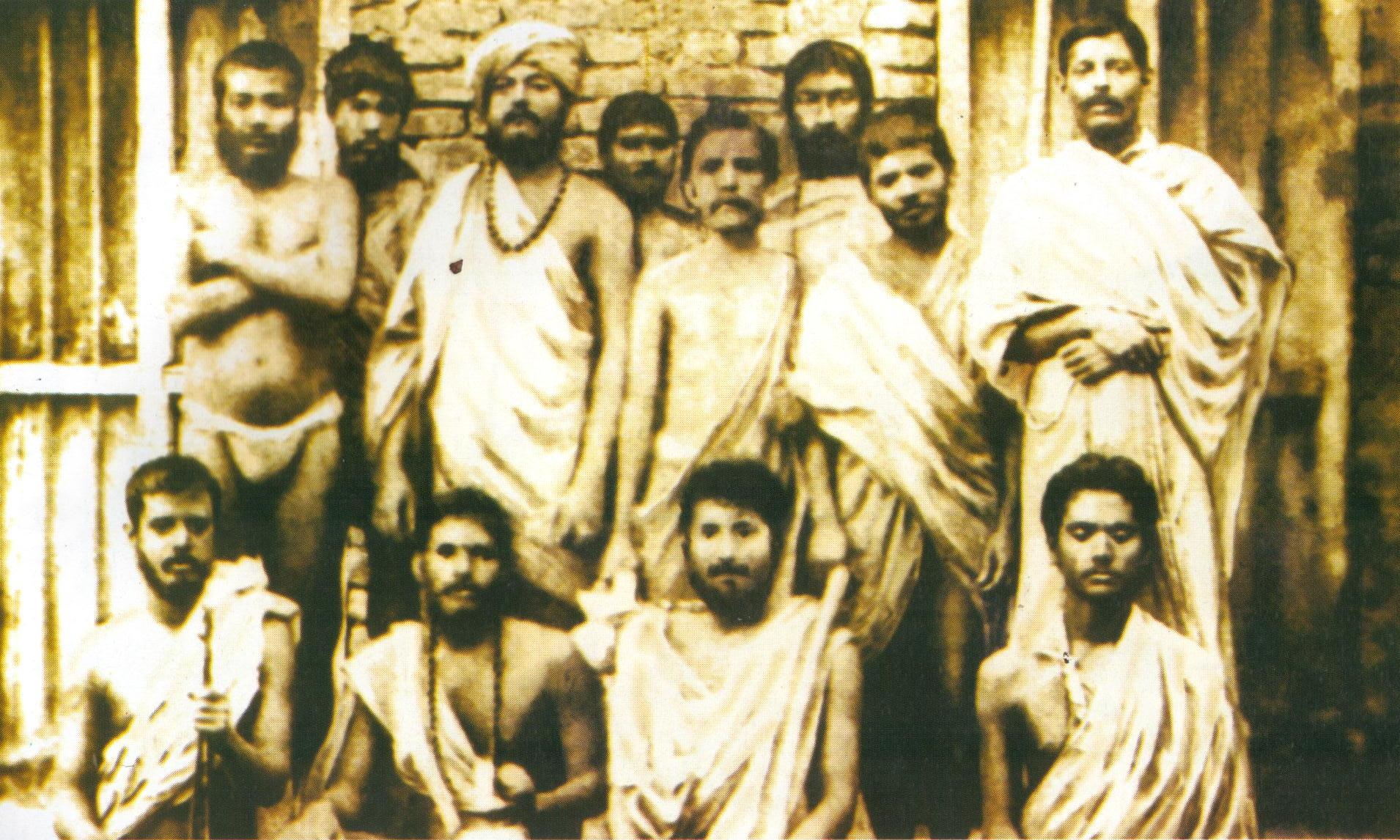
Group photo taken on 30 January 1887 In Baranagar Math, Kolkata. Standing: (l–r) Swami Shivananda, Swami Ramakrishnananda, Swami Vivekananda, Randhuni, Debendranath Majumdar, Mahendranath Gupta (Shri M), Swami Trigunatitananda, H.Mustafi Sitting: (l–r) Swami Niranjanananda, Swami Saradananda, Hutko Gopal, Swami Abhedananda

Tarak saw Ramakrishna for the first time at the house of Ramchandra Dutta in May 1880. A few days later he went to Dakshineswar to visit Kali Temple; from then he began to practise intense prayer and meditation under Ramakrishna's guidance. He later wrote "I have not yet come to a final understanding whether he [Ramakrishna] was a man or a superman, a god or the God Himself, but I have known him to be a man of complete self-effacement, master of the highest renunciation, possessed of supreme wisdom, and the supreme incarnation of love."

=== Marriage ===
Tarak married in 1881–82. His father could not afford a dowry for the marriage of his sister, as was usual; Tarak therefore agreed to marry a daughter of the prospective bridegroom's family. Three years later his wife died and Tarak started living sometimes in a devotee's house and sometimes in lonely places, till the Baranagar Math was started.

=== Renunciation ===
Tarak continued to visit Dakshineswar till Ramakrishna fell ill and was brought, first to the Shyampukur house and then later to the Cossipore Garden House. In Cossipore, Tarak joined with others including Narendranath Dutta, later known as Swami Vivekananda, to serve Ramakrishna.

After the death of Ramakrishna in 1886, the small group of direct disciples who decided to embrace monastic life gathered round in a dilapidated house in Baranagar; Tarak was one of the first to settle there. Thus began the Baranagar monastery of the Ramakrishna Math.

== Life of a Sannyasin (ascetic) ==
=== As a wandering monk ===
During his itinerant period, Shivananda travelled throughout northern India. He went to Almora, where he was acquainted with a local rich man, Lala Badrilal Shah, an admirer of Ramakrishna's disciples. During the latter part of 1893, Tarak also met E.T. Sturdy, an Englishman interested in theosophy, who later became an admirer and follower of Vivekananda after he met him in England. He was inclined towards leading a contemplative life and went to the Himalayas several times. He also went to Amarnath in 1909 with Swami Turiyananda.

=== Establishment of Ramakrishna Math and Mission ===
Tarak's itinerant life came to an end when Vivekananda returned to India in 1897. He went to Madras to receive Vivekananda, and came back with him to Calcutta. Vivekananda sent Shivananda to Ceylon, now Sri Lanka, to spread Vedanta there. There he held classes on Gita and the Raja Yoga. He returned to the newly established Ramakrishna Math or monastery in Belur in 1898. In 1899 Shivananda, upon request from Vivekananda, helped in organising relief efforts when plague broke out in Calcutta. In 1900 he travelled with Vivekananda to Mayavati. There is a dormitory named, in his honour, Shivananda Dham in Ramakrishna Mission Vidyapith, Deoghar.

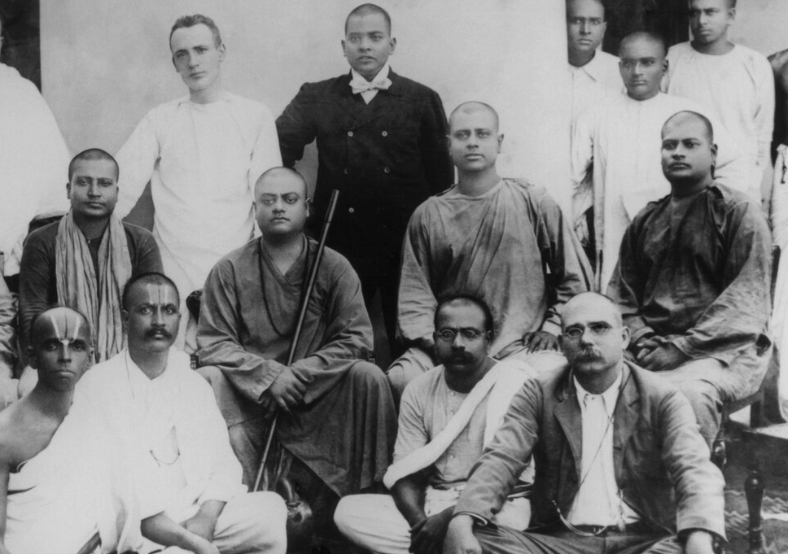
Seated on chairs Swami Shivananda, Swami Vivekananda, Swami Niranjananda and Swami Sadananda.

=== Advaita Ashrama, Benaras ===
In 1902, just before Vivekananda's death, he went to Varanasi to start the Advaita Ashrama using the donation by Raja of Bhinga to Vivekananda. There he remained as head for seven years. Money was short, and they lived austerely. About this time, he translated Vivekananda's Chicago lectures into local Hindi. He continued to look after the affairs of the Ashrama till 1909.

=== Office-bearer of Ramakrishna Mission ===
In 1910, he was elected vice-president of Ramakrishna Mission. Shivananda was also one of the original trustees of Belur Math. In 1917 when Baburam Maharaj (Swami Premananda) fell ill and died, his duties of managing the affairs of the Math and Mission fell on Shivananda. In 1922, after the death of Swami Brahmananda, he became the second President of Ramakrishna Math and Mission. Like Brahmananda, he stressed meditation along with his daily work. He went to Dhaka and Mymensingh in what became East Bengal, and initiated many spiritual seekers. In 1924 and 1927 he went on two long tours to the South, and established the Ramakrishna Math in Ootakamund and then later in Bombay and Nagpur. In 1925, he went to Deoghar and opened a new building for the local chapter of Ramakrishna Mission.

=== The title of Mahapurush ===
Tarak was married in his teens but, with the consent of his young wife, he lived an absolutely celibate life. and that's why after the foundation of Belur Math, he came to be known as 'Mahapurush Maharaj by Swami Vivekananda', 'Mahapurush' meaning 'A Great Man'.

== Last years ==
From 1930 on, Shivananda's health broke down rapidly. In April 1933 he suffered a stroke and developed paralysis of one side. On 20 February 1934, a few days after Ramakrishna's birthday, Shivananda died. The small room adjacent to the Old Shrine at Belur Math became known as the 'Room of Shivananda'.

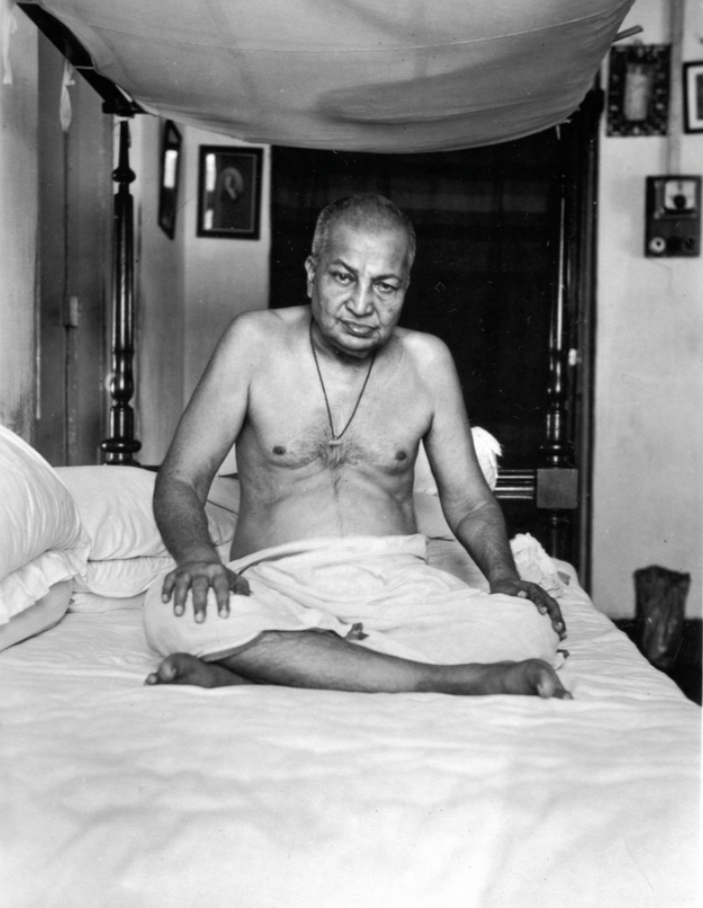
Last photograph of swami Shivananda

== Character and legacy ==
=== Work ===
Under Shivananda's presidency, the Ramakrishna Mission slowly expanded in other locations. He established centres in Ootacamund, Nagpur and Bombay. Centres were also opened in various foreign locations. In 1915, he established a Ramakrishna mission centre in Almora. He initiated many people after the death of Brahmananda.

=== Quotes ===
- It will not do to be restless. One has to get deeply absorbed in spiritual exercises; one must strengthen one's spiritual attitude in one's own mind. One may get a temporary enthusiasm by noticing someone else's spiritual fervour, but then one must remember that all such men had to pass through hard struggle
- Behind work there should be meditation. Without meditation, work cannot be performed in a way which conduces to spiritual growth. Nor is work nicely performed without having a spiritual background

=== Character ===
Shivananda washed the soiled clothes of a sick inmate to his monastery in Benaras. He started a free nursery school for the poor children in Benaras. After Brahmananda died, Shivananda refused to proclaim himself as president of Ramakrishna Mission because he considered himself as merely a representative of Brahmananda. He was in favour of disciplines in monastic life, and he himself practised them rigorously till he was physically unable to do.

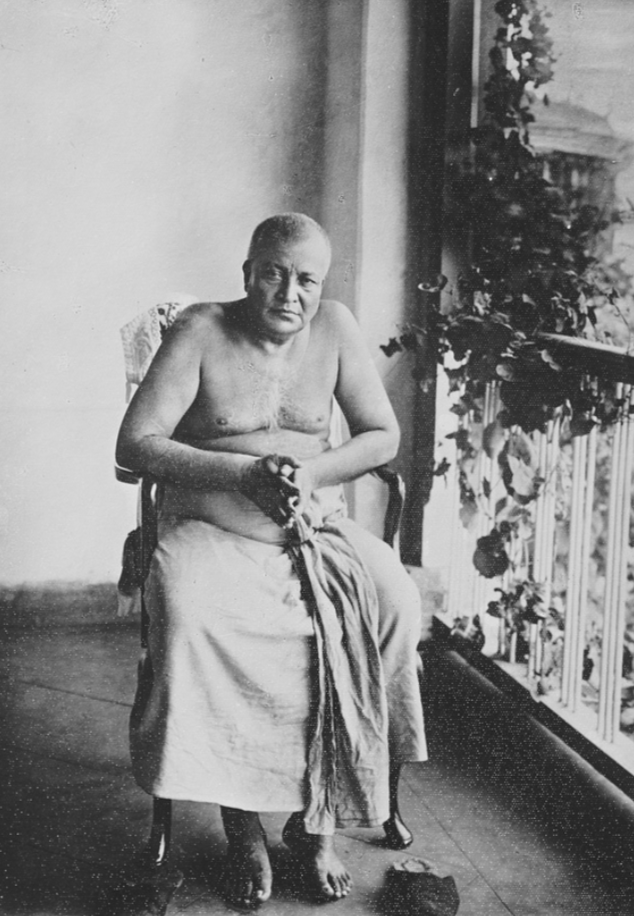
Swami Shivananda

== Related links ==
- RKM: President's site – Swami Shivananda
- The saga of a Great Soul, Swami Shivananda – Swami Vividishananda ISBN 0-87481-584-3
- Mahapurush Maharaj as we saw him ISBN 0-87481-053-1
- God lived with them – Swami Chetanananda ISBN 0-916356-80-9
- Reminiscences of Swami Shivananda by Swami Shambhavananda
- http://belurmath.org/shivananda.htm
- http://www.chennaimath.org/reminiscences-swami-shivananda-11715
