= Rajesh Tripathi =

Indian politician

Member of the Uttar Pradesh Legislative Assembly
- Incumbent
- Assumed office March 2022
- Preceded by: Vinay Shankar Tiwari
- Constituency: Chillupar
- In office May 2007 – March 2017
- Preceded by: Hari Shankar Tiwari
- Succeeded by: Vinay Shankar Tiwari
- Constituency: Chillupar

Personal details
- Born: 1964 or 1965 (age 61–62)
- Party: Bharatiya Janata Party
- Education: Deen Dayal Upadhyay Gorakhpur University, 1985

Rajesh Tripathi is an Indian politician and a member of 18th Legislative Assembly of Uttar Pradesh representing Chillupar. He is a member of the Bharatiya Janata Party, and had represented the Chillupar constituency as a member of the 15th and 16th Legislative Assembly of Uttar Pradesh. He is also known as Muktpath Wale Baba and has also served as a minister in the state government.

== Personal life ==
Tripathi was born to Shivakant Tripathi and hails from Chillupar in Gorakhpur district of Uttar Pradesh. He did his graduation from Deen Dayal Upadhyay Gorakhpur University in 1985.

== Political career ==
Tripathi defeated strongman Harishankar Tiwari in 2007 in the Uttar Pradesh assembly election, and repeated it again in 2012, becoming a member of the 15th and 16th Legislative Assemblies from Chillupar. In the 2017 election, Tripathi lost to Vinay Shankar Tiwari, son of Harishankar Tiwari.

In the 2022 Uttar Pradesh Legislative Assembly election, Tripathi defeated the junior Tiwari as a Bharatiya Janata Party candidate from Chillupar.

He served as the Minister for Homoeopathy and Religious Endowment in the Government of Uttar Pradesh, under the leadership of the Bahujan Samaj Party.

== Controversies ==
In 2009, a woman accused Tripathi of stealing her child from a hospital in 2004. Tripathi denied the allegation, claiming that the child had been found abandoned and was formally handed over to him by a village council, and expressed willingness to undergo a DNA test.
