= Swami Tejasananda =

Hindu swami of the Ramakrishna Math order

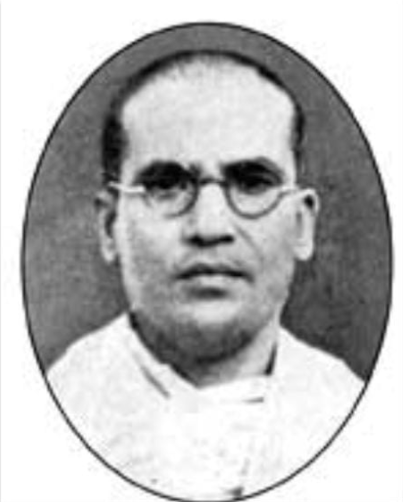

Personal life
- Born: Khagendranath Shikdar; January 1896 Hapania village, Manikganj District, Dhaka Division in present day Bangladesh
- Died: 11 May 1971 (aged 75) Kolkata, West Bengal, India
- Notable work(s): Sri Sri maa O Sapta Sadhika, Yugacharya Vivekananda, Bhagini Nivedita, Sridham Kamarpukur, Smritisanchayan, Sri Ramkrishna Jibani, Prarthana O Sangeet, A short life of Shri Ramkrishna, Holy Joyrambati, Swami Vivekananda and his message.

Religious life
- Religion: Hinduism
- Philosophy: Vedanta

Religious career
- Teacher: Swami Shivananda

Swami Tejasananda (1896–1971), born Khagendranath Shikdar, was a Hindu sanyasi who served as the founding principal of Ramakrishna Mission Vidyamandira, the first chief editor of Vedanta Kesari, as 11th chief editor of the Prabuddha Bharata.

== Biography ==
He was born at Hapania village of Manikganj District, Dhaka Division in present-day Bangladesh in the month of January in 1896. He was born to Rajanikanta Shikdar, in a Vaishnav Mahishya family. His father was a Pleader at the local district court.

He graduated from Rajshahi College with BA in History in 1917 and subsequently got admitted to the University of Calcutta for his Master of Arts. He used to travel to Belur Math every once in a while, where he met Sarada Devi, Swami Shivananda and many other disciples of Swami Vivekananda. He graduated from the University of Calcutta as third in First division, in the same year became a monk of the Ramakrishna Order.

He was initiated into Sannyasa by Swami Shivananda (a direct disciple of Swami Vivekananda) in 19 February of the year 1932. He aided Swami Madhavananda in the compilation of "A Cultural Heritage of India". He became the first chief editor of the journal Vedanta Kesari, from 1938 to 1939 and the 11th chief editor of Prabuddha Bharata. In 1941, he became the founding principal of the Ramakrishna Mission Vidyamandira in 1941 and served in that capacity till 1968.

He was diagnosed with Cancer on 1964, but still kept on working and refused to retire. He was operated on in SSKM Hospital, but couldn't entirely recover. He died on 27 December 1971, at Ramakrishna Mission Seva Pratishthan from Cancer.
