= Ramakrishna Mission Vidyamandira =

Autonomous degree college in West Bengal, India

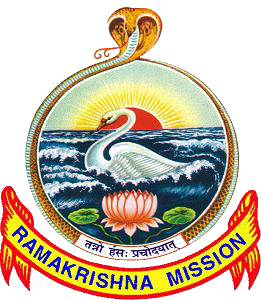
- Other name: RKMV
- Motto: Atmano mokshartham jagat hitaya cha (आत्मनो मोक्षार्थं जगद्धिताय च) (For one's own salvation and for the welfare of the world) (For the salvation of thyself and for the welfare of the universe.)
- Type: Government Aided Degree College
- Established: July 4, 1941; 85 years ago
- Affiliations: University of Calcutta
- Religious affiliation: Hinduism; Ramakrishna Mission
- Chairman: Swami Suparnanandaji
- Principal: Swami Mahaprajnananda
- Faculty: 72
- Location: Belur Math, West Bengal, India; 22.631669°N 88.354138°E
- Campus: Urban
- Website: vidyamandira.ac.in
- Location within Kolkata Location within India

Ramakrishna Mission Vidyamandira is an autonomous degree college of India located in Belur, Howrah near Belur Math.

== History ==
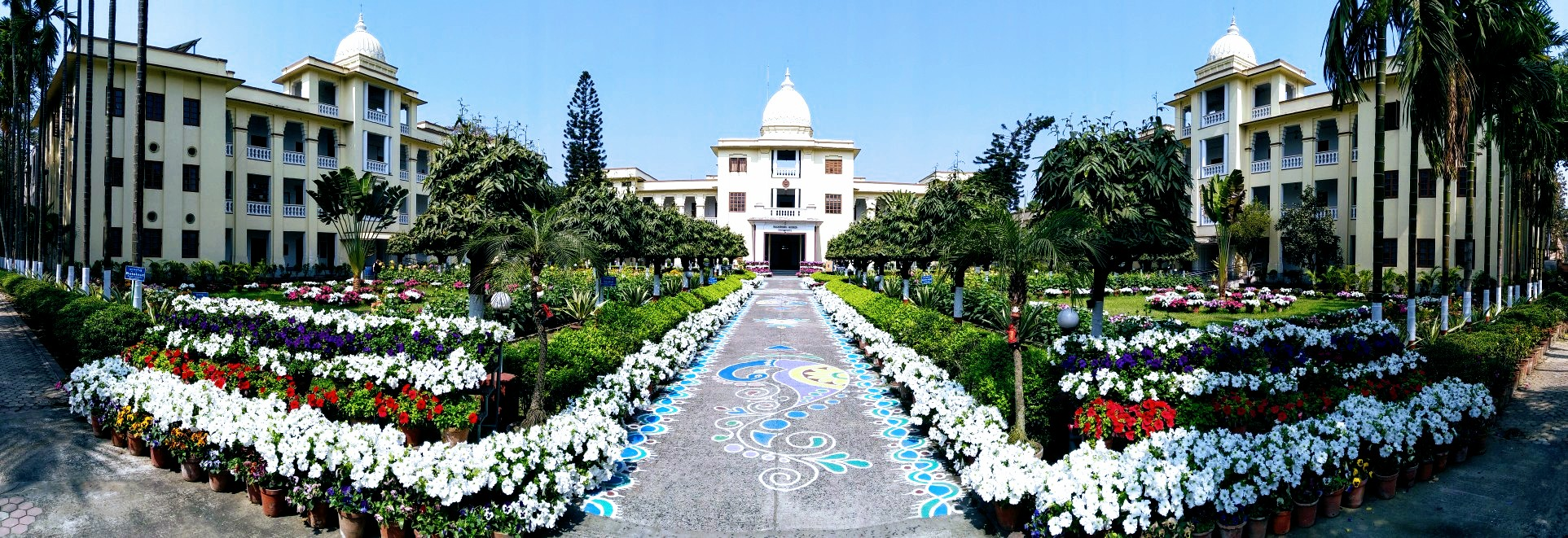
Panoramic view of the college campus

The Ramakrishna Mission Vidyamandira is a fully residential degree college for boys affiliated to the University of Calcutta founded in 1941 by the Ramakrishna Mission. The name 'Vidyamandira' was given by Swami Vivekananda in 1898 who had envisioned such an institution modeled on the ancient Indian 'Gurukula' system. Swami Vimuktanandaji and Swami Tejasanandaji were the founding Secretary and the founding principal, respectively, of this premier institute of higher learning.

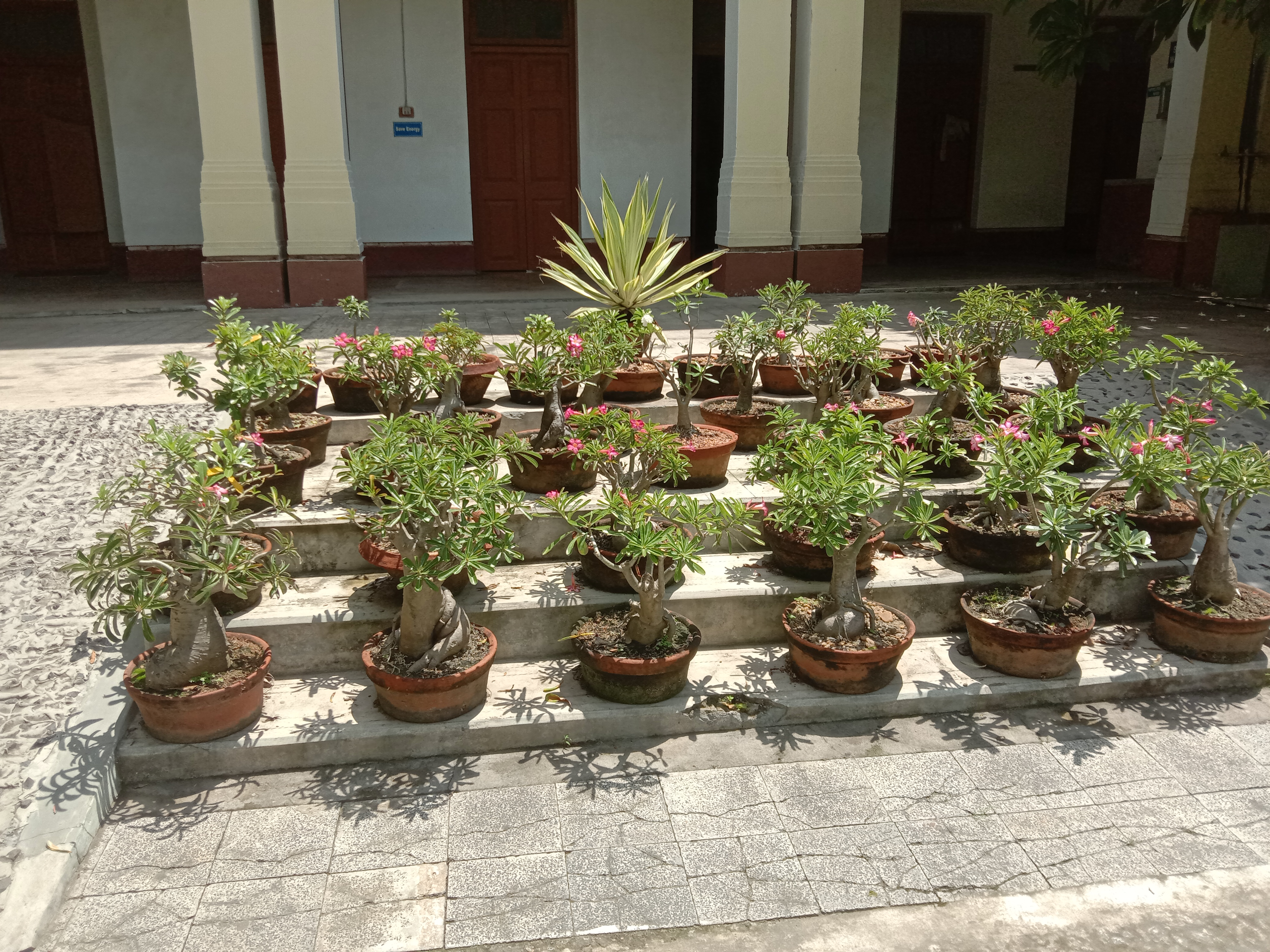
Adenium obesum plants at the campus of Ramakrishna Mission Vidyamandira

At the very beginning, it started as an intermediate arts college. In the year between 1945 and 1946, the college got affiliation in commerce and science subjects. It was upgraded into a three-year degree college from July 1960. The higher secondary section was added in September 1978 and later on discontinued as per the West Bengal state government policy. In the year 1994, two new courses, B.Sc. (Major) in Computer Applications and Industrial Chemistry, commenced under the UGC scheme of vocationalization of degree education. B.Sc. (Major) in Computer Application was changed to B.Sc. Computer Science Honours course in 2009 academic session. Postgraduate courses in Bengali, Sanskrit, Mathematics and Applied Chemistry have been introduced recently. From 2013 July academic session postgraduate course in Philosophy was introduced. Swami Atmapriyananda taught physics at the college for nearly 25 years and later serving as Vice-Principal and Principal for 19 years, till 2005.

In April 2010, the University Grants Commission (UGC) recognized Vidyamandira as a 'Centre of Potential for Excellence' (CPE); in June 2010 Vidyamandira was awarded with 'Autonomous' status in academic affairs, implying that Vidyamandira will be able to frame the syllabus, introduce new courses at the undergraduate and postgraduate levels, formulate teaching-learning-evaluation methods and offer degrees of its own.

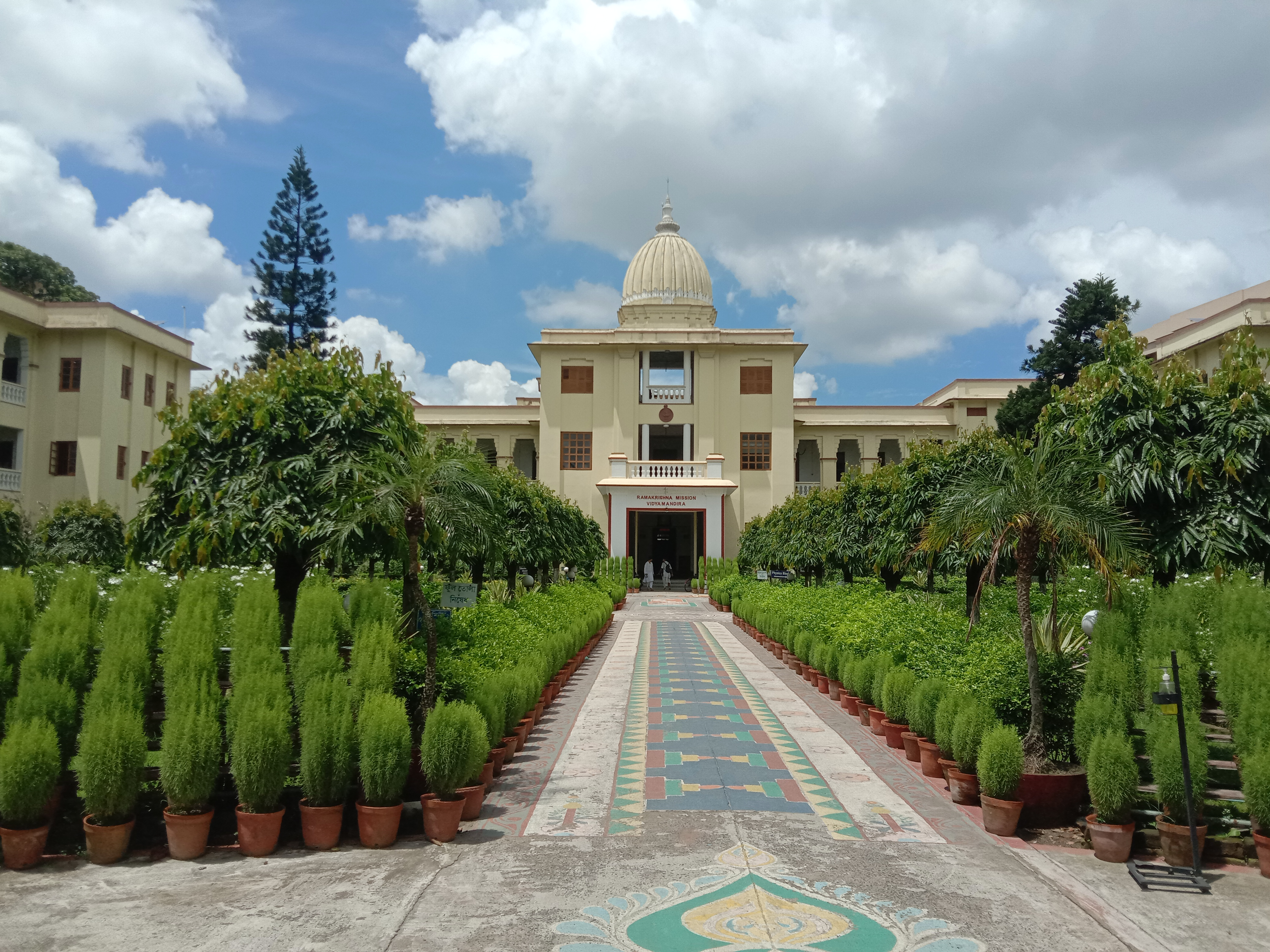
Ramakrishna Mission Vidyamandira in August 2022

The college ranked 9th among colleges in India by the National Institutional Ranking Framework (NIRF) during 2022. It held the 5th position in the previous academic year and the 9th and 11th positions earlier.

It was accredited 'A++' grade by the National Assessment and Accreditation Council (NAAC), India in 2022. In 2022 the college was re-accredited by the National Assessment and Accreditation Council with CGPA 3.58 out of 4 according to the present gradation policy.

College rankings

General – India
- NIRF (Colleges) (2022): 9

== Academics ==
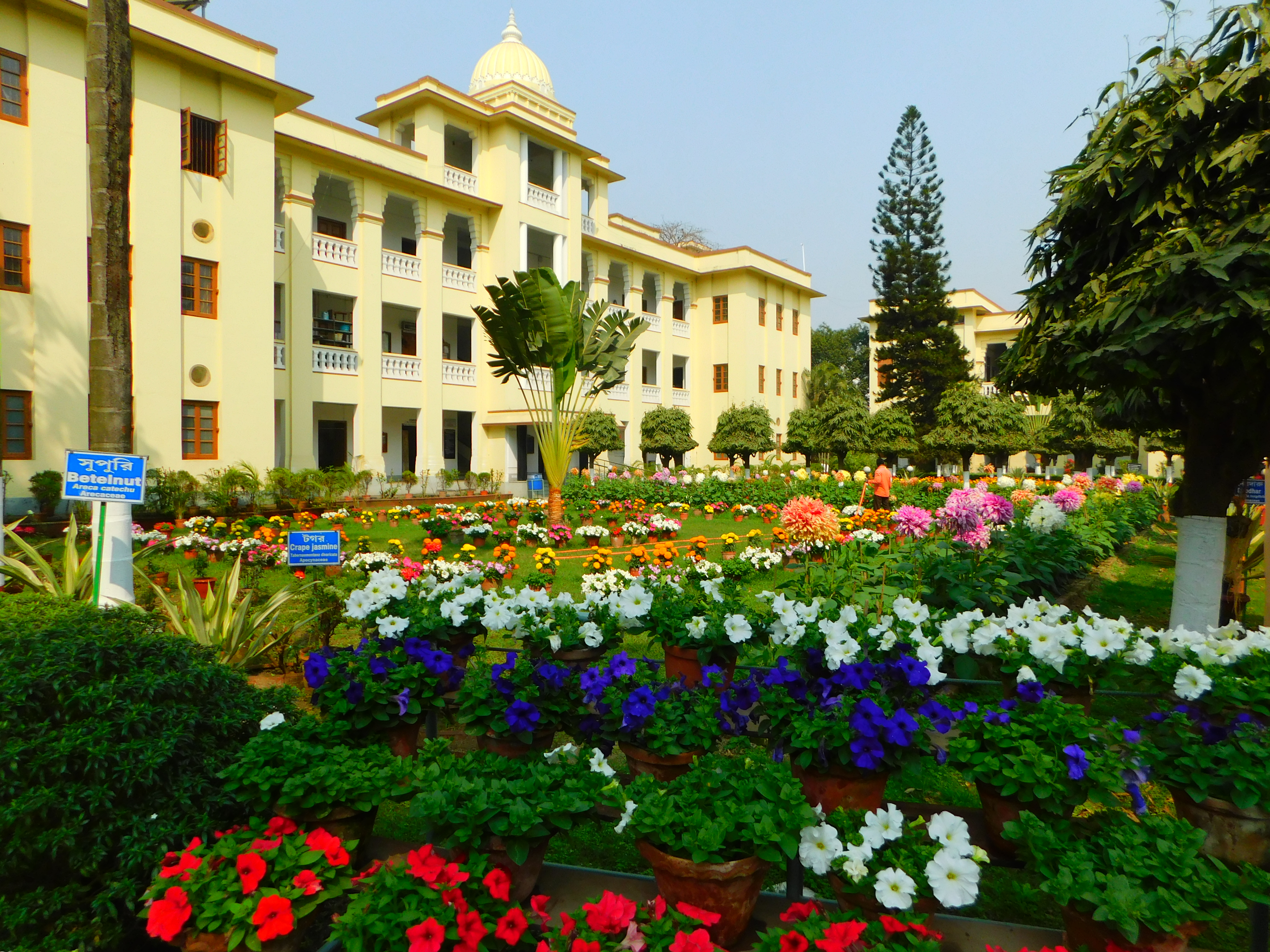
Chemistry building

At present, 14 undergraduate and 5 postgraduate courses are offered. Vidyamandira offers B.A. and B.Sc. Honours Courses in 14 subjects and M.A. and M.Sc. courses in 5 subjects.

Departments offering science courses

- Mathematics (Honours, Post-graduate and Ph.D.)
- Physics (Honours)
- Chemistry (Honours)
- Microbiology (Honours)
- Applied Chemistry (Postgraduate and Ph.D.)
- Industrial Chemistry (Honours)
- Computer Science (Honours(BSc. CS), Postgraduate (MSc. CSMI))
- Electronics (General Course Only)
- Statistics (General Course Only)
- Zoology (Honours)
- Economics (Honours)

Departments offering humanities and social sciences courses

- Bengali (Honours, Postgraduate and P.hd)
- Sanskrit (Honours and Postgraduate)
- English (Honours)
- Philosophy (Honours, Postgraduate, M. Phil, Ph.D)
- Political Science (Honours)
- History (Honours)

== Student life ==
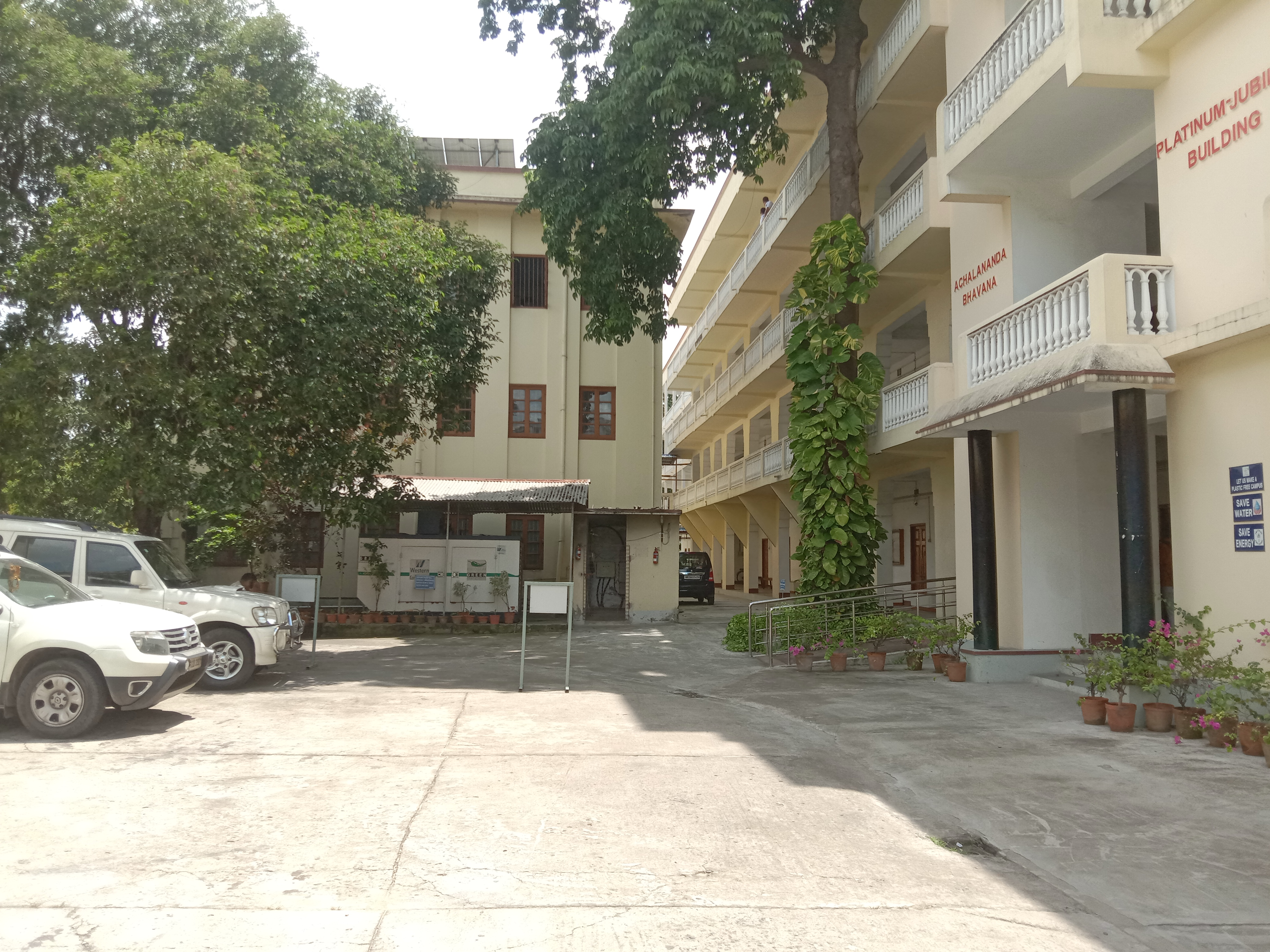
Inside view of the Ramakrishna Mission Vidyamandira in Belur Math

There are around 600 students enrolled in this college. The students stay at five hostels at the sprawling campus: 'Shree', 'Vidya', 'Vinay', 'Vivek' and 'Shraddha'. These hostels are called "Bhavanas". There are different dining halls for each bhavana. A small size playground is also present inside the campus. Another large playground is also present outside the main campus. A big air conditioning auditorium is also present. A library building, some conference rooms, 2 canteens, 'Kim prayojanam' (shop for various useful items) are present inside the campus. Recently, at Rishra 2nd campus of vidyamandira, Bose House Campus, was inaugurated. Students are expected to lead a disciplined life under the supervision of the monastic members of the Ramakrishna order while at the college.

== Notable alumni ==
- Ananda Mohan Chakrabarty, notable microbiologist
- Sabyasachi Sarkar, notable chemist
- Swarup Dutta, notable actor
- Ramkumar Mukhopadhyay, Ananda Puraskar winning writer
- Debabrata Maiti, recipient of Shanti Swarup Bhatnagar Prize in Chemical Sciences
- Anindya Das, recipient of Shanti Swarup Bhatnagar Prize in Physical Sciences

== See also ==
- List of colleges affiliated to the University of Calcutta
- Education in India
- Education in West Bengal
