= Surti Narayan Mani Tripathi =

Indian civil servant and politician (1900–1988)

Member of the Legislative Council
- In office 1967–1968

Member of the Legislative Council
- In office 1974–1977

Vice Chancellor of Sampurnanand Sanskrit Vishwavidyalaya

Personal details
- Born: 1900 Barpar, Gorakhpur, British India
- Died: 1988 (aged 87–88)
- Education: St. Andrew's College; Muir Central College; University of Allahabad
- Alma mater: University of Allahabad
- Occupation: Civil servant, Politician
- Known for: First ICS of Uttar Pradesh, Founder President of Gorakhpur University

Surti Narayan Mani Tripathi, also known as S.N.M. Tripathi and Pandit Tripathi (1900–1988), was an Indian civil servant and later a politician from Gorakhpur, Uttar Pradesh. He was the first ICS of Uttar Pradesh and the founder president of Gorakhpur University. He served as a Member of the Legislative Council from Uttar Pradesh twice, first from 1967 to 1968 and in the second term from 1974 to 1977. He served as the Vice Chancellor of Sampurnanand Sanskrit Vishwavidyalaya and played an important role in establishment of Gorakhpur University. His Son Prakash Mani Tripathi (Lt. Gen. Retired )and grandson Shashank Mani Tripathi

== Early life ==
He was born in 1900 in the village of Barpar, Gorakhpur district into a Saryuparin Brahmin family. He began at the Lower Primary School in Barpar, followed by schools in Sirjam and Majhauli Raj. He completed high school at Government Jubilee School in 1918 and went on to St. Andrew's College for his intermediate studies. In 1921, he enrolled at Muir Central College in Allahabad for his Bachelor of Arts degree, which he completed in 1923. He obtained his Master of Arts and Bachelor of Laws degrees from University of Allahabad.

== Career ==
In 1925, he returned to Gorakhpur and practised law in the civil court. He was selected for the PCS (Provincial Civil Service) in the same year and was posted to the Basti district for his first assignment. After India's independence in 1947, he was granted the Indian Administrative Service (IAS) cadre. He served as District magistrate of Gorakhpur, Allahabad, and Lucknow.

In 1956, Surti Narayan was appointed as a member of the Public Service Commission, serving until 1961. He then served as Senior Deputy Managing Director and Vice Chairman of the British India Corporation in Kanpur. In 1962, he was appointed Vice Chancellor of Sampurnanand Sanskrit University in Varanasi.

=== Politics ===
In June 1966, SNM Tripathi retired from the Indian Civil Service and returned to Gorakhpur. He then entered into politics, contesting and winning the Gorakhpur-Faizabad graduate constituency in the Uttar Pradesh Legislative Council (MLC) for the first time (1967–1968). Re-elected in 1974, he served another term as an MLC but chose not to contest further elections. Tripathi died in 1988.
