= Bhishma Shankar Tiwari =

Indian politician

Member of Parliament, Lok Sabha
- In office 2009–2014
- Preceded by: constituency established
- Succeeded by: Sharad Tripathi
- Constituency: Sant Kabir Nagar
- In office 2008–2009
- Preceded by: Bhal Chandra Yadav
- Succeeded by: constituency abolished
- Constituency: Khalilabad

Personal details
- Born: 30 September 1960 (age 65) Tanda, Uttar Pradesh, India
- Citizenship: India
- Party: Samajwadi Party (since December 2021)
- Other political affiliations: Bahujan Samaj Party(2007-2021)
- Spouse: Reena Tiwari (m. 1986)
- Children: 4
- Parent: Hari Shankar Tiwari (father)
- Relatives: Vinay Shankar Tiwari (brother)
- Profession: Farmer; politician
- Website: Profile

Bhishma Shankar "Kushal" Tiwari (born 30 September 1960) is an Indian politician. He was a Member of Parliament in the 14th and 15th Lok Sabha, representing the Sant Kabir Nagar constituency of Uttar Pradesh as a member of the Bahujan Samaj Party political party. Tiwari joined Samajwadi Party in December 2021.

== Life and education ==
Tiwari was born in Tanda to Hari Shankar Tiwari and Ramlali Devi. His highest attained education is intermediate. By profession, he is a farmer. His brother is politician Vinay Shankar Tiwari. Tiwari married Reena Tiwari on 6 June 1986. They have two sons and two daughters.

== Political career ==
Tiwari started his political career as a member of the Bharatiya Janata Party, on whose ticket he contested the Lok Sabha elections from Balrampur in eastern Uttar Pradesh. Later, he represented Bahujan Samaj Party as a Member of Parliament in the 14th and 15th Lok Sabhafrom the Sant Kabir Nagar.

Tiwari joined Samajwadi Party in December 2021.

== Posts held ==
#	From	To	Position
01	2008	2009	Member, 14th Lok Sabha
02	2009	2014	Member, 15th Lok Sabha
03	2009	2014	Member, Committee on Public Undertakings
04	2009	2014	Member, Committee on External Affairs
05	2009	2014	Member, Committee on Public Undertakings

== See also ==
- Sant Kabir Nagar (Lok Sabha constituency)
