= Nitin Agrawal =

Indian politician based in Uttar Pradesh

Nitin Agarwal
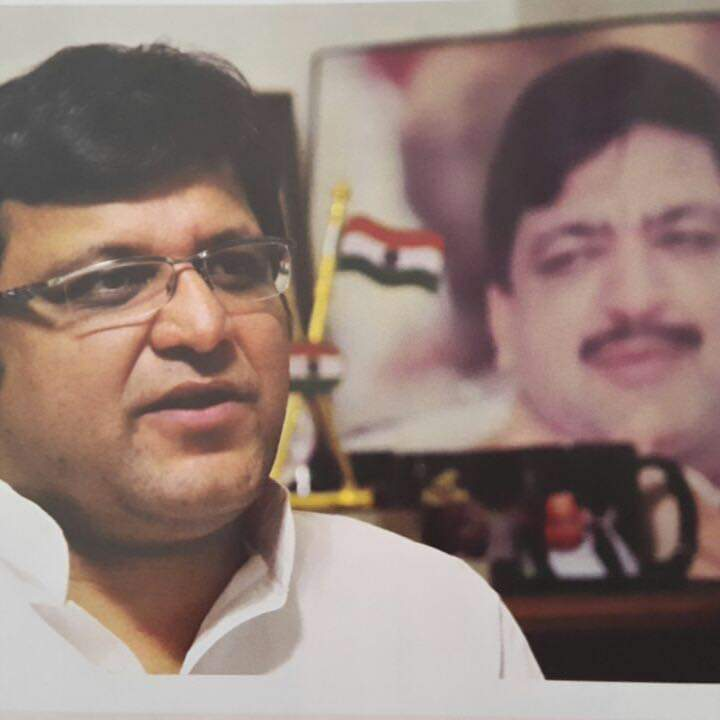

Minister of State (Independent Charge) Government of Uttar Pradesh
- Incumbent
- Assumed office 25 March 2022
- Chief Minister: Yogi Adityanath
- Ministry & Department's: Excise; Liquor Prohibition

Member of Uttar Pradesh Legislative Assembly
- Incumbent
- Assumed office 8 March 2012
- Preceded by: Naresh Chandra Agarwal
- Constituency: Hardoi

Personal details
- Born: 9 August 1981 (age 45) Hardoi, Uttar Pradesh, India
- Party: BJP
- Parent: Naresh Chandra Agarwal (father)
- Education: Symbiosis International Education Centre & University of Delhi
- Profession: Politician & farmer

Nitin Agarwal is an Indian politician and a member of the Uttar Pradesh Legislative Assembly, representing the Sadar constituency in Hardoi (156). He has held various important positions in the Uttar Pradesh state government.

== Political career ==
Nitin Agarwal's political career began with his election to the 15th Uttar Pradesh Legislative Assembly in 2008 through a by-election. He has since been elected to the 16th, 17th, and 18th Legislative Assemblies.

1. 2008–2012 : Elected as a member of the 15th Legislative Assembly through a by-election from the Sadar constituency, Hardoi.

2. 2012–2017 : Served as a member of the 16th Legislative Assembly .

3. 2017–2022 : Re-elected to the 17th Legislative Assembly and continued his legislative work.

4. 2022–present : Currently serving as a member of the 18th Legislative Assembly.

== Posts held ==
#	From	To	Position	Comments
01	2022	Incumbent	Minister of Independent Charge – Excise & prohibition	Government of Uttar Pradesh
02	2022	Incumbent	Member, 18th Legislative Assembly	
03	2017	2022	Member, 17th Legislative Assembly	
04	2012	2017	Member, 16th Legislative Assembly	
05	2007	2012	Member, 15th Legislative Assembly	Elected during the by-election

Ministerial Positions

Nitin Agarwal has held several ministerial roles within the Uttar Pradesh government, focusing on health, small and medium enterprises, export promotion, and excise.

1. 2013–2014 : Appointed State Minister for Health.

2. 2014–2017 : Held the position of State Minister (Independent Charge) for Micro, Small and Medium Enterprises (MSME) and Export Promotion.

3. 2022–present : Serving as the Minister of State (Independent Charge) for Excise and Prohibition in the Government of Uttar Pradesh.

https://www.jagran.com/news/national-akhilesh-yadav-inducts-12-new-ministers-into-cabinet-10108349.html

Deputy Speaker

On 18 October 2021, Nitin Agarwal was appointed the Deputy Speaker of the Uttar Pradesh Legislative Assembly, a position he held until 19 January 2022.

https://uplegisassembly.gov.in/deputyspeaker/present_deputyspeaker_en_.aspx#/present_deputyspeaker

Residence

Nitin Agarwal's official residence is located at B-988, Sector-A, Mahanagar, Lucknow, which serves as his base for political and public engagements.

== See also ==
- Hardoi (Assembly constituency)
- 18th Uttar Pradesh Assembly
- Uttar Pradesh Legislative Assembly
