= Kenneth Karlin (chemist) =

Kenneth D. Karlin
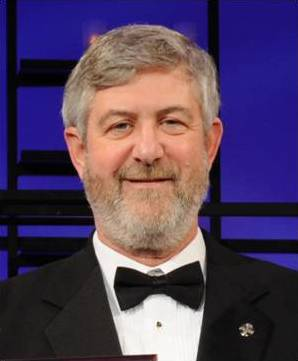
- Born: October 30, 1948 (age 77); Pasadena, California, US
- Education: Stanford University (BS); Columbia University (PhD)
- Known for: Copper and Heme-Oxygen and NO_{x} Chemistry
- Scientific career
- Fields: Inorganic Chemistry
- Workplaces: Johns Hopkins University, SUNY at Albany, Ewha Womans University

Kenneth D. Karlin (born October 30, 1948) is an American chemist and a professor of chemistry at Johns Hopkins University in Baltimore, Maryland. He was born on October 30, 1948, in Pasadena, California. Research in his group focuses on coordination chemistry relevant to biological and environmental processes, involving copper or heme complexes. Of particular interest are reactivities of such complexes with nitrogen oxides, O_{2}, and the oxidation of substrates by the resultant compounds. He is also the Editor-in-Chief of the book series Progress in Inorganic Chemistry.

== Awards and honors ==
- Maryland Chemist of the Year Award (American Chemical Society Maryland Section), 2011
- F. Albert Cotton Award in Synthetic Inorganic Chemistry, 2009
- 2009 Sierra Nevada Distinguished Chemist Award
- Appointed to Ira Remsen Chair in Chemistry, Johns Hopkins University, May 1999.
- Elected Chair, 1998 Metals in Biology Gordon Research Conference
- "MERIT" Award, 1993–2003, National Institute of General Medical Sciences (NIH)
- Fellow, American Association for the Advancement of Science (AAAS) – elected October, 1992
- 1991 Buck-Whitney Award (ACS Eastern New York Section Research Award)
- University "Excellence in Research" Award, SUNY at Albany, 1988
- General Electric Visiting Faculty Research Fellow, GE R&D Center, Schenectady, NY, 1986–87

== Positions ==
- 1977–1983 Assistant Professor: Department of Chemistry, SUNY at Albany, Albany, NY
- 1983–1987 Associate Professor: Department of Chemistry, SUNY at Albany, Albany, NY
- 1987–1990 Professor: Department of Chemistry, SUNY at Albany, Albany, NY
- 1990–present Professor: Department of Chemistry, Johns Hopkins University, Baltimore, MD
- 2009–present Professor: Department of Bioinspired Science, WCU Program, MOBIC (Metal Oxygen BioInspired Chemistry) Group Ewha Womans University Seoul, KOREA

== Personal ==
Karlin is the son of Stanford mathematician Samuel Karlin.
