= Samaresh Mitra =

Indian bioinorganic chemist

- Born: 17 March 1940; West Bengal, India
- Education: University of Gorakhpur; University of Melbourne
- Known for: Studies on inorganic paramagnetic and low-symmetry transition metal complexes
- Awards: 1983 Shanti Swarup Bhatnagar Prize; 2002 CRSI Silver Medal; 2005 ISCA D. S. Kothari Memorial Gold Medal
- Scientific career
- Fields: Bioinorganic chemistry; Biological chemistry
- Workplaces: Indian Association for the Cultivation of Science; Tata Institute of Fundamental Research; Indian Institute of Chemical Biology; University of Oxford; Ohio State University; University of Pennsylvania; University of North Carolina; Australian National University; Monash University
- Doctoral advisor: Akshyananda Bose

Samaresh Mitra (born 1937) is an Indian bioinorganic chemist and an INSA Senior Scientist at the Indian Institute of Chemical Biology (IICB). He is known for his research on inorganic paramagnetic complexes and low-symmetry transition metal complexes. He is an elected fellow of the Indian National Science Academy, the National Academy of Sciences, India and the Indian Academy of Sciences. The Council of Scientific and Industrial Research, the apex agency of the Government of India for scientific research, awarded him the Shanti Swarup Bhatnagar Prize for Science and Technology, one of the highest Indian science awards, in 1983, for his contributions to chemical sciences.

== Biography ==
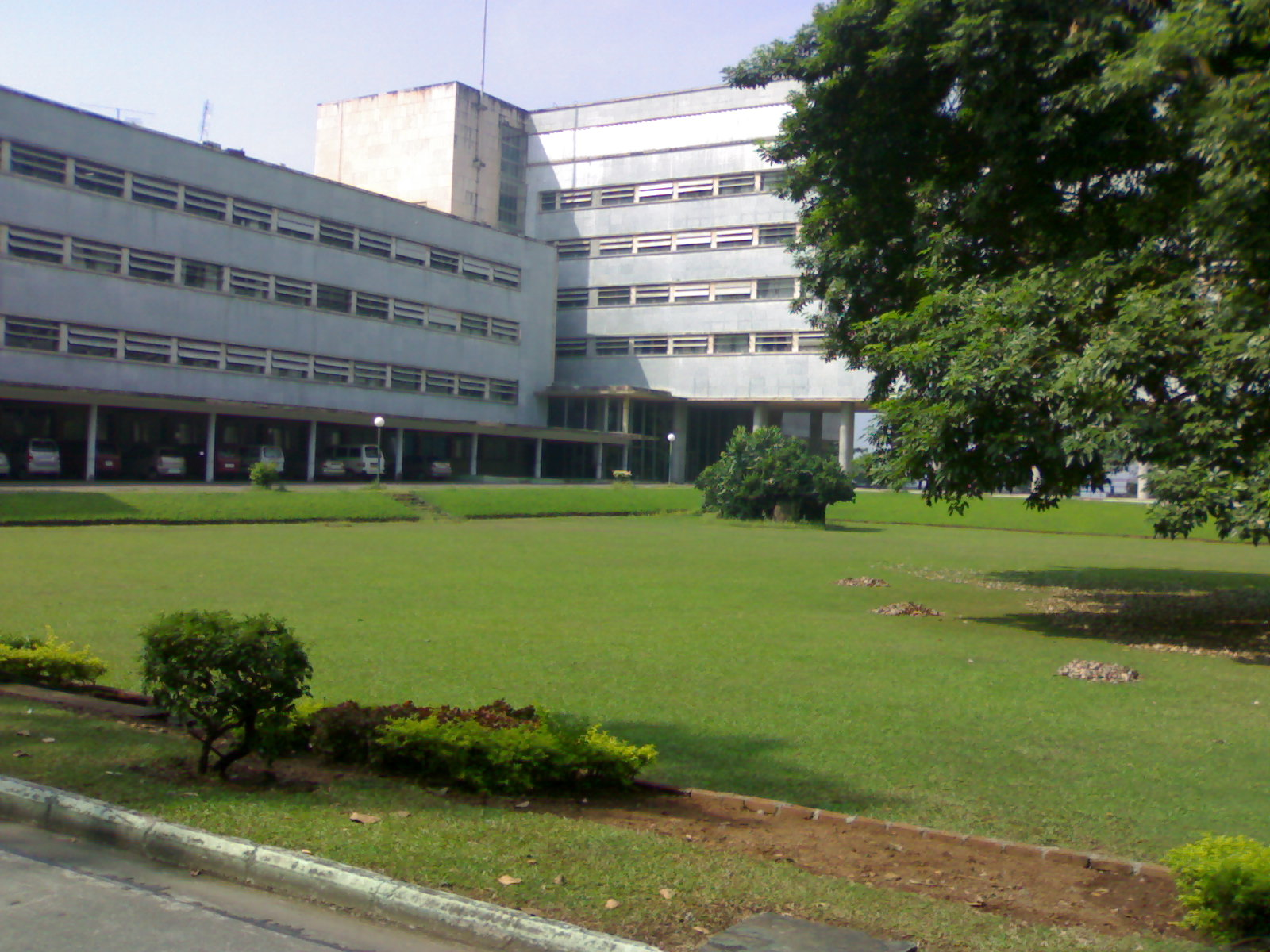
Tata Institute of Fundamental Research.

Born on 17 March 1940 in the Indian state of West Bengal, Samaresh Mitra graduated in chemistry from the Deen Dayal Upadhyay Gorakhpur University and completed his master's degree form the same institution. Enrolling for his doctoral studies in 1962 at the Indian Association for the Cultivation of Science (IACS) where he had the opportunity to work under the guidance of Akshayananda Bose, a renowned chemist, (Note: Mitra wrote the article on Akshayananda Bose in the Memoirs published by the Indian National Science Academy in 2009.) he secured his DPhil in 1966 and moved to the University of Melbourne the same year for his post-doctoral studies at the department of chemistry of the university. On his return to India in 1970, he started his career by joining the Tata Institute of Fundamental Research (TIFR) where he spent his entire academic career till his superannuation as a Senior Professor in 2003. Subsequently, he moved to the Indian Institute of Chemical Biology (IICB) as a Raja Ramanna fellow where he continues as an INSA Senior Scientist. During the course of his career, he served as a visiting scholar at the University of Oxford, as a visiting professor at the Ohio State University, University of Pennsylvania, University of North Carolina, Australian National University and Monash University and as a visiting fellow at Tezpur University.

== Legacy ==
Mitra's research was focused on physico-chemical and spectroscopic studies of bimolecular systems. He deployed single crystal magnetic anisotropy and Nuclear magnetic resonance spectroscopy for investigating inorganic paramagnetic complexes such as metalloporphyrins and low-symmetry transition metal complexes and his work is reported to have widened our understanding of their electronic structures. His contribution to magnetochemistry is marked by the methodologies he developed to measure single crystal susceptibilities. Working on the magnetic and electronic properties of phthalocynines, metal porphyrins and similar inorganic materials, the team led by him discovered the molecular ferromagnet and elucidated their electronic structures for the first time. He also elucidated a method for the determination of the electronic structures of low symmetry systems utilizing their single crystal magnetic properties, also reported to be a first time discovery. Later in his career, he studied metal enzymes and proteins with regard to their enzyme-substrate interaction, molecular recognition, drug metabolism as well as the catalytic functions of several enzymes. These studies have assisted in resolving problems faced by the researchers on metabolic and catalytic pathways.

Mitra's researches have been documented in over 140 articles published in peer-reviewed journals (Note: Please see Selected bibliography section) and several authors have quoted his work. Besides, he has also contributed chapters to seven books authored by others, including Single Crystal Magnetic Study on Ferromagnetic Manganese (II) Phthalocyanine, published by the Defense Technical Information Center in 1982. On the academic front, he established a bioinorganic chemistry laboratory at Tata Institute of Fundamental Research and organised an international conference series on bioinorganic chemistry which is now conducted every four years. He was among the group of scientists who initiated the Modern Trends In Inorganic Chemistry, a bi-annual conference in 1985 and serves as a member of its national advisory committee. He is also associated with a number of journals as their editorial board member and has sat in various committees set up by the Department of Science and Technology, Council of Scientific and Industrial Research and the University Grants Commission of India.

== Awards and honors ==
The Council of Scientific and Industrial Research awarded Samaresh Mitra the Shanti Swarup Bhatnagar Prize, India's highest award in science, in 1983. He received the Silver Medal of the Chemical Research Society of India in 2002 and the D. S. Kothari Memorial Gold Medal of the Indian Science Congress Association in 2005. An elected scholar of the St John's College, Oxford in 1986, he is an elected fellow of all the three major Indian science academies, viz. Indian National Science Academy, Indian Academy of Sciences, and the National Academy of Sciences, India. The award orations delivered by him include the INSA S. Swaminathan 60th Birthday Commemoration Lecture (1998) and the C. Natarajan Endowment Medal of the Madurai Kamaraj University (1998).

== Selected bibliography ==
=== Books ===
- Mitra, S. (1977). "Chemical Applications of Magnetic Anisotropy Studies on Transition Metal Complexes". In S. J. Lippard (ed.). Progress in Inorganic Chemistry. Vol. 22. Hoboken, NJ, USA.: John Wiley & Sons. pp. 309–408b. doi:10.1002/9780470166239.ch3. ISBN 9780470166239.
- Mitra, Samaresh (1982). Single Crystal Magnetic Study on Ferromagnetic Manganese (II) Phthalocyanine. Defense Technical Information Center.

=== Articles ===
- Barraclough, C.G.; Martin, R.L.; Mitra, S.; Sherwood, R.C. (1970). "Paramagnetic Anisotropy, Electronic Structure, and Ferromagnetism in Spin S = 32 Manganese(II) Phthalocyanine". The Journal of Chemical Physics. 53 (5): 1638–1642. Bibcode:1970JChPh..53.1638B. doi:10.1063/1.1674236.
- Gregson, A.K.; Martin, R.L.; Mitra, S. (1971). "The magnetic anisotropy and electronic structure of binuclear copper (II) acetate monohydrate". Proceedings of the Royal Society of London A: Mathematical, Physical and Engineering Sciences. 320 (1543): 473–486. Bibcode:1971RSPSA.320..473G. doi:10.1098/rspa.1971.0004. S2CID 95396229.
- Prasad, Swati; Maiti, Nakul C.; Mazumdar, Shyamalava; Mitra, Samaresh (2002). "Reaction of hydrogen peroxide and peroxidase activity in carboxymethylated cytochrome c: spectroscopic and kinetic studies". Biochimica et Biophysica Acta (BBA) - Protein Structure and Molecular Enzymology. 1596 (1): 63–75. doi:10.1016/S0167-4838(02)00205-4. PMID 11983422.
- Sau, Apurba Kumar; Currell, Douglas; Mazumdar, Shyamalava; Mitra, Samares (2003). "An NMR and circular dichroism study of the interaction of thiocyanate with human and cross-linked hemoglobin: identification of Lys-α-99 as a possible dissociation linked binding site". Biophysical Chemistry. 106 (3): 233–240. doi:10.1016/S0301-4622(03)00154-6. PMID 14556895.
- Prasad, Swati; Mitra, Samaresh (2004). "Substrate modulates compound I formation in peroxide shunt pathway of Pseudomonas putida cytochrome P450cam". Biochemical and Biophysical Research Communications. 314 (2): 610–614. doi:10.1016/j.bbrc.2003.12.141. PMID 14733951.
- Prasad, Swati; Murugan, Rajamanickam; Mitra, Samaresh (2005). "An artificial electron donor supported catalytic cycle of Pseudomonas putida cytochrome P450cam". Biochemical and Biophysical Research Communications. 335 (2): 590–595. doi:10.1016/j.bbrc.2005.07.118. PMID 16084834.
- Mukherjee, M.; Das, A. S.; Das, D.; Mukherjee, S.; Mitra, S.; Mitra, C. (2007). "Role of peritoneal macrophages and lymphocytes in the development of hypogonadal osteoporosis in an ovariectomized rat model: possible phytoestrogenic efficacy of oil extract of garlic to preserve skeletal health". Phytotherapy Research. 21 (11): 1045–1054. doi:10.1002/ptr.2209. PMID 17600860. S2CID 26439461.
- Mitra Samaresh (2009). "Akshayananda Bose". Biog. Mem. Fell. 36. Indian National Science Academy: 1–10.

== See also ==
- Ferromagnetism
- Magnetochemistry
