= Akhil Bharatiya Loktantrik Congress =

Defunct political party in India

- Abbreviation: ABLC
- Leader: Naresh Agarwal
- Founder: Naresh Agarwal; Jagdambika Pal; Bacha Pathak; Rajeev Shukla; Hari Shankar Tiwari; Shyam Sunder Sharma; Suresh Chand Bhardwaj; Atul Kumar Singh; Shripati Singh
- Founded: 1997
- Split from: Indian National Congress
- Merged into: Samajwadi Party
- ECI Status: dissolved party
- Alliance: National Democratic Alliance

Akhil Bharatiya Loktantrik Congress was a regional political party in the Indian state of Uttar Pradesh. It was founded in October 1997 by Naresh Agarwal along with Jagdambika Pal, Atul Kumar Singh, Bacha Pathak, Rajeev Shukla, Hari Shankar Tiwari, Suresh Chand Bhardwaj, Shripati Singh and Shyam Sunder Sharma. The party was formed when these leaders broke away from the Indian National Congress to join the All India Indira Congress (Tiwari), led by N. D. Tiwari which led another switched to form Loktantrik Congress.

Jagdambika Pal served as the Chief Minister of Uttar Pradesh for 3 days from 21 February 1998 to 23 February 1998 when Governor of Uttar Pradesh Romesh Bhandari dismissed Kalyan Singh government. Kalyan Singh moved Allahabad High Court which termed the dismissal of government unconstitutional on 23 February 1998, thereby reinstating the Kalyan Singh government. Naresh Agarwal was named the Deputy Chief Minister of Uttar Pradesh.

The party became partners in (Atul Kumar Singh) & Kalyan Singh, Ram Prakash Gupta and Rajnath Singh governments.

== Electoral history ==
=== Lok Sabha:UP ===
Elections	MP	Contested
1999	2	4

=== State ===
Elections	MLA	Contested
1998	22	defection
2002	2	25
2007	1	2
2012	0	1
