= Hari Shankar Tiwari =

Indian gangster and politician

Cabinet Minister Government of Uttar Pradesh
- In office September 1997 – May 2007
- Chief Minister: Kalyan Singh; Jagdambika Pal; Ram Prakash Gupta; Rajnath Singh; Mayawati; Mulayam Singh Yadav

Member of Uttar Pradesh Legislative Assembly
- In office (1985-1989), (1989-1991), (1991-1993), (1993-1996), (1996-2002), (2002 – 2007)
- Preceded by: Bhirgu Nath Chaturvedi
- Succeeded by: Rajesh Tripathi
- Constituency: Chillupar

Personal details
- Born: 5 August 1933 Tanda, Chillupar, Gorakhpur, Uttar Pradesh, India
- Died: 16 May 2023 (aged 89) Tiwari Hata, Chillupar, Gorakhpur, Uttar Pradesh, India
- Party: Samajwadi Party
- Other political affiliations: Indian National Congress; All India Indira Congress (Tiwari); Akhil Bharatiya Loktantrik Congress; Bahujan Samaj Party; Independent
- Spouse: Ramlali Devi
- Children: 3, including Bhishma Shankar Tiwari; Vinay Shankar Tiwari

Hari Shankar Tiwari (5 August 1933 – 16 May 2023) was an Indian gangster and criminal turned politician. Tiwari was a member of the Uttar Pradesh Legislative Assembly from the village Tanda, Chillupar in Gorakhpur district.

Tiwari was a cabinet minister at the State Assembly in several governments.

In 1997, he became the Transport minister in the Kalyan Singh government. In 2000, he was the Stamp and Registration cabinet minister in BJP's Ram Prakash Gupta's government. In 2001, he was appointed Science and Technology minister in Rajnath Singh government. In 2002, he was the cabinet minister in Mayawati's Government. He served as a minister also in the Mulayam Singh Yadav (Samajwadi Party) government (2003–2007).

== Personal life ==
Tiwari Hata in Gorakhpur was the official residence of Harishankar Tiwari. His son Bhishma Shankar Tiwari, was Member of Parliament, Sant Kabir Nagar seat west of Gorakhpur.

Another son, Vinay Shankar Tiwari, stood from Gorakhpur but lost to Yogi Adityanath by a margin of 222,000 votes. He also lost a runoff election from Ballia in 2007 by 130,000 votes. He was an MLA from Chillupar from 2018 to 2022.

Nephew Ganesh Shankar Pandey was a state legislator from Maharajganj. In 2010 he won the MLC election for the fourth consecutive time, and was the speaker of the legislative council.

Tiwari was succeeded by Rajesh Tripathi. After that Vinay Shankar Tiwari won again from the Chillupar constituency in the 17th Legislative Assembly of Gorakhpur. The latter however lost to Tripathi in the 2022 Uttar Pradesh Legislative Assembly election.

Tiwari died of kidney failure on 16 May 2023, at the age of 89.

== Positions held ==
#	From	To	Position	Party
1.	1985	1989	MLA (1st term) from Chillupar	IND
2.	1989	1991	MLA (2nd term) from Chillupar	INC
3.	1991	1993	MLA (3rd term) from Chillupar	INC
4.	1993	1996	MLA (4th term) from Chillupar	INC
5.	1996	2002	MLA (5th term) from Chillupar	AIIC(T)
6.	2002	2007	MLA (6th term) from Chillupar	ABLTC

Note: He also contested from same seat in 2007 and 2012, but lost.
