= Rajeev Shukla =

Indian politician

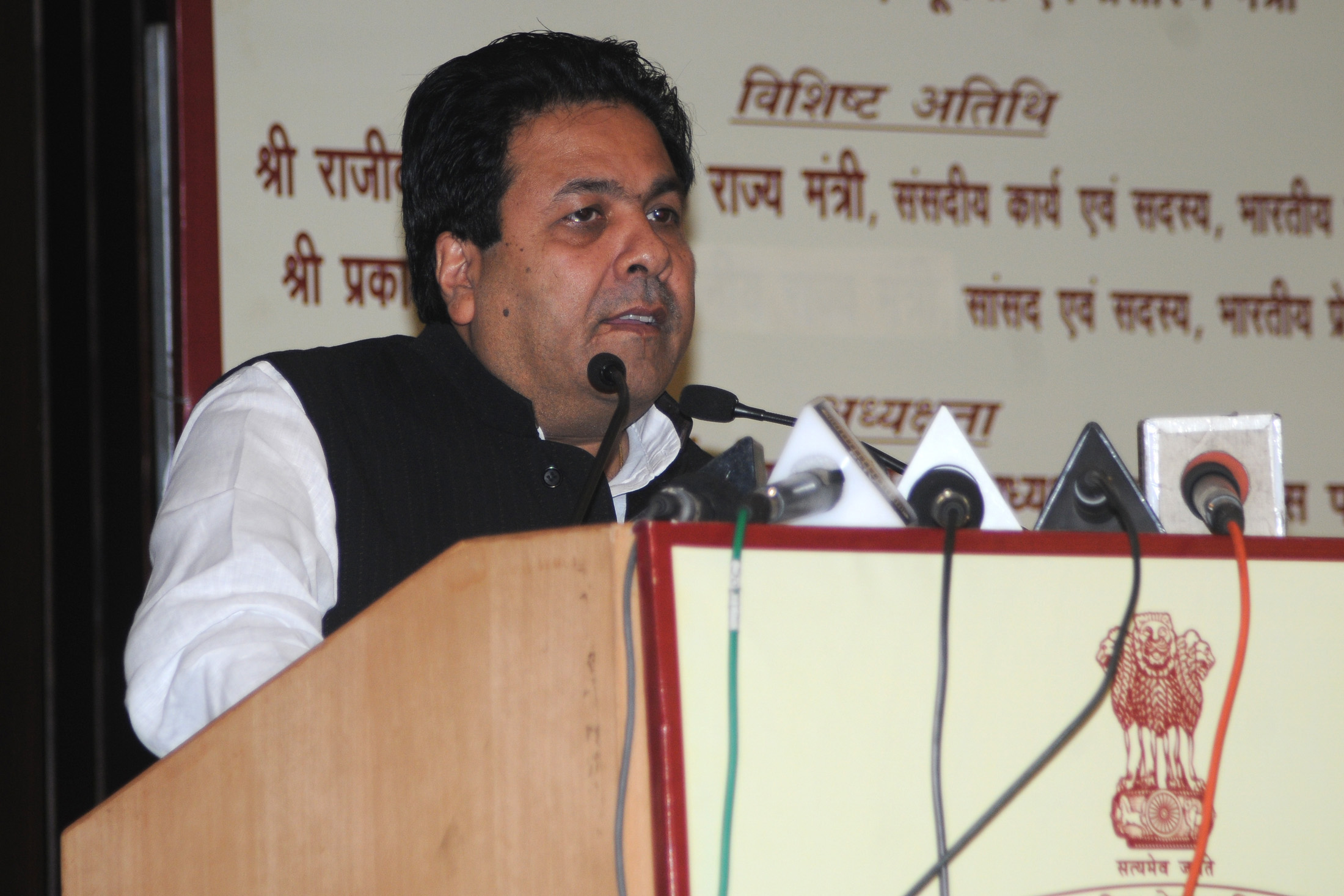
- Shukla in 2011

Member of Parliament, Rajya Sabha
- Incumbent
- Assumed office 29 June 2022
- Preceded by: Chhaya Verma
- Constituency: Chhattisgarh
- In office 3 April 2006 – 2 April 2018
- Preceded by: Sushilkumar Shinde
- Succeeded by: Kumar Ketkar
- Constituency: Maharashtra
- In office 3 April 2000 – 2 April 2006
- Preceded by: Janeshwar Mishra
- Succeeded by: Balihari
- Constituency: Uttar Pradesh

Vice President of BCCI
- Incumbent
- Assumed office 24 December 2020
- President: Sourav Ganguly; Roger Binny; Mithun Manhas
- Preceded by: Mahim Verma

Union Minister of State Government of India
- In office 12 July 2011 – 26 May 2014
- Prime Minister: Manmohan Singh
- Ministry& Department's: Ministry of Parliamentary Affairs (July 2011-May 2014); Ministry of Planning(October 2012-May 2014)

Personal details
- Born: 13 September 1959 (age 67) Kanpur, Uttar Pradesh, India
- Party: Indian National Congress
- Other political affiliations: Akhil Bharatiya Loktantrik Congress
- Spouse: Anurradha Prasad (m. 1988)
- Relations: Ravi Shankar Prasad (brother-in-law)
- Children: 1
- Known for: Chairman of Indian Premier League

Rajeev Shukla (born 13 September 1959) is an Indian politician, former journalist, political commentator and the former chairman of Indian Premier League. In 2015, he was re-appointed unanimously as the Chairman of IPL by the BCCI. On 18 December 2020, he was elected unopposed Vice President of the BCCI.

== Early life ==
Rajeev Shukla was born on 13 September 1959 in Kanpur, Uttar Pradesh. He studied at Pandit Prithi Nath College, Kanpur, and Christ Church College, Kanpur. He then studied law at Vikramajit Singh Sanatan Dharma College, Kanpur.

Before entering politics, he was friends with Deepa Saxena, with whom he shared the theater stage, and he was a reporter for the Hindi daily Jansatta. Shukla held this job until 1985, when he became a special correspondent for Ravivar Magazine. He was hired as a senior editor, and he continued in that job until being elected to the Rajya Sabha in 2000. He has now joined the Indian National Congress.

== Personal life ==
Rajeev Shukla is married to Anurradha Prasad. Anurradha Prasad is Managing Director of B.A.G. Films and Media Limited, and is sister of Ravi Shankar Prasad. The couple has one daughter Vaanya Shukla.

== Political activities ==
Running as a member of the Akhil Bhartiya Loktantrik Congress Party, Shukla won by a large margin. In 2003, his party merged with the Indian National Congress, and Shukla was appointed as a spokesperson. He was nominated as a secretary to the All India Congress Committee in January 2006. In March 2006, Shukla was elected for a second term.

Shukla and Ranjeet Ranjan were elected unopposed to the Rajya Sabha from Chhattisgarh in June 2022.

== Cricket Administration ==
Shukla entered the Uttar Pradesh Cricket Association (UPCA) as a core administrator and committee representative in 1989. He soon became the Secretary of UPCA and remained on this position till 2017.

Two years later, he made his debut into national administration by joining the BCCI Junior Cricket Committee, while he got appointed as the official Media Manager for the Indian Cricket Team during the NatWest Series triumph in England in 2002.

During late 2000, Shukla got elected as the BCCI Vice-President for the first time, while also serving in different core financial and media sub-committees of BCCI.

He was the Chairman of the Indian Premier League (IPL) from 2011-13, and resigned in June 2013 following the IPL spot-fixing controversy of 2013.

He was reappointed as IPL Chairman for 2015–2018 by the Board of Control for Cricket in India (BCCI) to serve his second tenure.

He got elected unopposed as the BCCI Vice-President in 2020, getting reelected in 2022.

He got inducted in the Board of Directors for the Asian Cricket Council (ACC) in 2025 and also remained acting/Interim BCCI President from July 2025, after Roger Binny having reached the age ceiling of 70 years.

== Cricket Controversies ==
Shukla has gone through many controversies during his career as cricket administrator.

=== 2013 IPL Spot-Fixing Scandal ===
The 2013 IPL Spot-Fixing Scandal, that shook the cricket world, whose dispute went up to Supreme Court of India, took place during Shukla's first tenure as IPL Chairman. The tournament was hit hard by massive spot-fixing and betting allegations involving players and officials. In fact, Shukla was forced to resign from his position as IPL Chairman in June 2013 due to intense public pressure and judicial scrutiny.

=== 2018 Selection Bribery Sting Operation ===
Shukla faced intense scrutiny after a sting operation coming in light, wherein his personal executive assistant, Akram Saifi, was found demanding bribes and favors from a local cricketer in exchange for selection in the Uttar Pradesh under-23 junior cricket team. Saifi was forced to resign. Questions were also raised about Shukla's accountability and role, though the matter ended with Saifi.

=== Conflict of Interest Notice ===
Following his election as BCCI Vice-President in December 2020, the BCCI Ethics Officer issued a formal notice to Shukla in January 2021 regarding "conflict of interest" complaints, where it had been claimed he was violating the BCCI constitution by simultaneously holding positions in the state association (UPCA) and in the BCCI.

=== Disqualification and Cooling-Off ===
Shukla faced multiple challenges after the Lodha Committee reforms. In fact, he got briefly disqualified in 2019 from BCCI over a cooling-off period dispute. Another complaint filed in this regard against him in 2025 was later dismissed by the BCCI Ombudsman.

=== Lalit Modi allegations ===
Lalit Modi, an Indian businessman, who was the founder and first chairman of the Indian Premier League (IPL), and was banned by the Board of Control for Cricket in India (BCCI) for life on September 25, 2013, made a spate of social media posts and media interviews in May-June 2026.

His May 2026 social media posts alleged Shukla’s close aide Saifi, of running a corrupt exploitation and blackmail racket targeting vulnerable young cricketers. He alleged Saifi of approaching an upcoming, young cricketer aspiring for IPL, asking for huge money. HE alleged Saifi of resorting to blackmail the player through a select journalist. Modi alleged that this type of extortion and manipulation has become rampant in UPCA and IPL.

In his June 2026 interviews, including a detailed interview with ANI Editor-in-Chief Smita Prakash, Modi made several sensational claims against many Congress leaders, including ex Congress President Sonia Gandhi. He claimed that ex Congress President Sonia Gandhi had backed the then Minister Shashi Tharoor, who was at the back of Kochi Tuskers. Modi claimed that "all guns were trained on me", naming Ahmed Patel, Pranab Mukherjee, and Shukla, as pressurizing him to clear the Kochi franchise deal on behalf of Gandhi.

So far there has been no response from Shukla or the Congress Party on this matter.

== Rajya Sabha Election History ==
| Position | Party | Constituency | From | To | Tenure |
|---|---|---|---|---|---|
| Member of Parliament, Rajya Sabha (1st Term) | ABLTC | Uttar Pradesh | 3 April 2000 | 2 April 2006 | 5 years, 364 days |
| Member of Parliament, Rajya Sabha (2nd Term) | INC | Maharashtra | 3 April 2006 | 2 April 2012 | 5 years, 365 days |
| Member of Parliament, Rajya Sabha (3rd Term) | INC | Maharashtra | 3 April 2012 | 2 April 2018 | 5 years, 364 days |
| Member of Parliament, Rajya Sabha (4th Term) | INC | Chhattisgarh | 30 June 2022 | 29 June 2028 | 5 years, 365 days |
