= Pach Pokhari =

Village in Uttar Pradesh, India

Coordinates: 26°50′45″N 82°59′37″E

Pachpokhri
- Village
- Pach Pokhari
- Interactive map of Pachpokhri
- Country: India
- State: Uttar Pradesh
- District: Sant Kabir Nagar
- Taluka: Khalilabad

Area
  - Total: 100.84 ha (249.2 acres)

Population (2011)
  - Total: 3,052

Languages
  - Official: Hindi
- Time zone: UTC+5:30 (IST)
- Postal code: 272125

Pach Pokhari is a village located in the taluka of Khalilabad in the district of Sant Kabir Nagar in Uttar Pradesh, India. As of the 2011 census, the total population is 3,052. The village covers an area of 100.84 hectares. The LGD code is 182726 and the village locality code is 272125.

The village falls under the Khalilabad Assembly Constituency and under the Sant Kabir Nagar Parliamentary Constituency. Bharatiya Janata Party candidate Ankur Raj Tiwari is the MLA for Khalilabad since 2022. Praveen Kumar Nishad, also form BJP is the Member of Parliament from Sant Kabir Nagar Constituency.
