= Mohamed Ayub =

Indian politician

Dr. Mohamed Ayub

MLA in Sixteenth Legislative Assembly of Uttar Pradesh
- In office March 2012 – March 2017
- Preceded by: Bhagwan Das
- Succeeded by: Digvijay Narayan alias Jay Chaubey
- Constituency: Khalilabad

President of Peace Party of India
- Incumbent
- Assumed office February 2008
- Preceded by: Position Created

Personal details
- Born: 1955 (age 70–71) Barhalganj in Gorakhpur, India
- Party: Peace Party of India
- Education: Institute of Medical Sciences, Banaras Hindu University
- Profession: Doctor, Politician
- Website: peacepartyofindia.org

Dr. Mohamed Ayub or Dr. Ayub is an Indian politician and president of Peace Party of India. He was elected as an MLA in the 16th Legislative Assembly of Uttar Pradesh. From 2012 to 2017 he represented Khalilabad (Assembly constituency) in Sant Kabir Nagar district as a member of Peace Party of India.

== Early life and career ==
Dr. Mohammad Ayub was born in Barhalganj, Teh.-Gola, Gorakhpur in 1955 to Aashiq Ali. He studied to become a Master of Surgery in 1985 from Banaras Hindu University Varanasi (M.S.), F.A.I.S. & F.I.C.S. and he was a successful businessman in the medical field.

== Career ==
Dr. Ayub fought his maiden election from Khalilabad (Sant Kabir Nagar) assembly seat of Basti division in Uttar Pradesh state assembly election in 2012. After the good performance of party's Lok Sabha 2009 candidate from Sant Kabir Nagar, Dr. Ayub won the Khalilabad assembly seat in 2012 by 5392 votes over his rival Mashoor Alam (Bahujan Samaj Party).

=== Sexual exploitation case ===
On 25 February 2017, Ayub was booked for allegedly sexually exploiting a young woman who later died from liver and kidney damage. According to the woman's brother, Ayub had brought the girl to Lucknow from Khalilabad on the pretext of providing her better education and promising to make her a doctor. But the case is still going to trial.
