= Dhanghata Assembly constituency =

Constituency of the Uttar Pradesh legislative assembly in India

Coordinates: 26.54°N 83.01°E

Dhanghata
- Constituency No. 314 for the Uttar Pradesh Legislative Assembly

Constituency details
- Country: India
- Region: North India
- State: Uttar Pradesh
- District: Sant Kabir Nagar
- Total electors: 357,096 (2017)
- Reservation: SC

Member of Legislative Assembly
- 18th Uttar Pradesh Legislative Assembly
- Incumbent Ganesh Chandra Chauhan
- Party: Bharatiya Janta Party
- Elected year: 2022

Dhanghata is a constituency of the Uttar Pradesh Legislative Assembly covering the city of Dhanghata in the Sant Kabir Nagar district of Uttar Pradesh, India. It is one of five assembly constituencies in the Sant Kabir Nagar Lok Sabha constituency. Since 2008, this assembly constituency is numbered 314 amongst 403 constituencies.

Since 2017, Bharatiya Janta Party member Sriram Chauhan is the MLA, who won in the 2017 Uttar Pradesh Legislative Assembly election defeating Samajwadi Party candidate Agloo Prasad by a margin of 16,909 votes.

== Members of the Legislative Assembly ==
Year	Member	Party
Till 2012 : Constituency did not exist
2012	Alagoo Prasad Chauhan	Samajwadi Party
2017	Sriram Chauhan	Bharatiya Janata Party
2022	Ganesh Chandra Chauhan	Bharatiya Janata Party

== Election results ==
=== 2027 ===
2027 Uttar Pradesh Legislative Assembly election: Dhanghata
Party	Candidate	Votes	%	±%
INDIA				
NDA				
BSP				
NOTA	None of the above			
Majority				
Turnout				
gain from		Swing		

=== 2022 ===
2022 General Elections: Dhanghata (SC)
Party	Candidate	Votes	%	±%
BJP	Ganeh Chandra	83,241	38.5	▼1.23
SBSP	Alagu Prasad	72,688	33.62	
BSP	Santosh	40,693	18.82	▼7.11
Independent	Yashavant	5,433	2.51	
Jan Adhikar Party	Narendra Dev	3,960	1.83	
VIP	Amrit Kumar	2,266	1.05	
INC	Shanti Devi	1,971	0.91	
NOTA	None of the above	1,915	0.89	▼0.05
Majority		10,553	4.88	▼3.56
Turnout		216,222	55.81	▼0.27
BJP gain from SBSP		Swing		

=== 2017 ===
2017 General Elections: Dhanghata (SC)
Party	Candidate	Votes	%	±%
BJP	Sriram Chauhan	79,572	39.73	
SP	Algoo Prasad Chauhan	62,663	31.29	
BSP	Neel Mani	51,938	25.93	
NOTA	None of the above	1,871	0.94	
Majority		16,909	8.44	
Turnout		200,275	56.08	
BJP gain from SP		Swing		

=== 2012 ===
2012 General Elections: Dhanghata (SC)
Party	Candidate	Votes	%	±%
SP	Algoo Prasad Chauhan	66,337	35.55	▲35.55
BSP	Ram Sidhare	51,388	27.54	▲27.54
BJP	Neel Mani	40,491	21.70	▲21.70
PECP	Surendra Kumar	9,660	5.18	▲5.18
INC	Archana Mahatam	9,293	4.98	▲4.98
SBSP	Om Hari	3,726	2.00	▲2.00
	Remainder 5 Candidates	5,725	3.07	Steady
Majority		14,949	8.01	▲8.01
Turnout		1,86,620	55.30	▲55.30
SP win (new seat)				
