= Khalilabad Lok Sabha constituency =

Former constituency of the Indian parliament in Uttar Pradesh

Coordinates: 26.8°N 83.1°E

Khalilabad
- Former Lok Sabha constituency

Constituency details
- Country: India
- Region: North India
- State: Uttar Pradesh
- Established: 1957
- Abolished: 2008

Khalilabad was a Lok Sabha constituency in Uttar Pradesh state in northern India until 2008.

== Assembly segments ==
Khalilabad comprised the following five assembly segments:

1. Alapur
2. Khajni
3. Menhdawal
4. Khalilabad
5. Dhanghata

== Members of Parliament ==
- 1957: Kapil Dev Rai, Indian National Congress
- 1962 Sri Ram Rai, Bharatiya Jana Sangh
- 1967: Major Ranjeet Singh, Bharatiya Jana Sangh
- 1971: Krishna Chandra Pandey, Indian National Congress,
- 1977: Brij Bhushan Tiwari, Janata Party
- 1980: Krishna Chandra Pandey, Indian National Congress (Indira)
- 1984: Chandra Shekhar Tripathi, Indian National Congress
- 1989: Ram Prasad Chaudhary, Janata Dal
- 1991: Ashthabhuja Prasad Shukla, Bharatiya Janata Party
- 1996: Surendra Yadav, Janata Dal
- 1998: Indrajeet Mishra, Bharatiya Janata Party
- 1999: Bhal Chandra Yadav, Samajwadi Party
- 2004: Bhal Chandra Yadav, Bahujan Samaj Party
- 2008: Bhisma Shankar Tiwari, Bahujan Samaj Party (By Poll)

After 2008 Delimition, this comes under Sant Kabir Nagar Lok Sabha constituency

== See also ==
- Sant Kabir Nagar district
- List of former constituencies of the Lok Sabha
