= Ashthabhuja Prasad Shukla =

Indian politician

Member Of Parliament, Lok Sabha
- Prime Minister: P. V. Narsimha Rao
- Preceded by: Ram Prasad Chaudhary
- Succeeded by: Surendra Yadav
- Constituency: Khalilabad, Uttar Pradesh
- In office July 1991 – May 1996

Personal details
- Party: Bharatiya Janta Party
- Spouse: Smt. Savitri Shukla(m. 1978)
- Education: St. Andrews P.G. College, Gorakhpur
- Profession: Agriculturist

Ashthabhuja Prasad Shukla (born 20 December 1955) is an Indian politician. He represented the Khalilabad constituency in the Lok Sabha during 1991-1996 (10th Lok Sabha). He is a member of Bharatiya Janata Party (BJP).

== Early life ==
Shukla was born in Katar Soyam village in Sant Kabir Nagar district of Uttar Pradesh to Shri Kapil Dev Shukla and Smt. Phoolmati Devi in a Brahmin family. He received a postgraduate degree in Political Science from St. Andrews Gorakhpur. In 1977, he was elected General Secretary of the student's union of St. Andrews P.G. College in Gorakhpur.

In 1973, he joined Rashtriya Swayamsevak Sangh. Shukla spent considerable time in prison during the Emergency. This is where he developed close relations with Atal Bihari Vajpayee. He took part in the Ram Janmabhoomi movement. He would be an active member of any national movement that would be organized anywhere in the country. One such movement was the Indian flag hoisting at Lal Chowk in Srinagar alongside Murli Manohar Joshi.

== Political career ==
His political career began when he was elected as the President of Students Union at TDM Gorakhpur in 1973 and later as General Secretary of Students Union at St. Andrews P.G. College in 1977. He was elected to the 10th Lok Sabha for the first time in 1991 from Khalilabad, Uttar Pradesh after defeating Surendra Yadav of the Janata Dal by a close margin. He completed his 5 year term in 1996.

He contested for Loksabha elections again in 1999. He also contested for Vidhan Sabha elections from Basti in 2007.

He was in charge of the BJP cell of Gorkahpur from 2010-2012. He was again made in charge of the BJP cell of Deoria district from 2012-2015. He is currently member of the Rashtriya Parishad of Bharatiya Janta Party.

| Positions Held | City | Duration |
|---|---|---|
| President Students Union, TDM Gorakhpur | Gorakhpur | 1973 - 1974 |
| General Secretary, Students Union, St. Andrews P.G. College | Gorakhpur | 1977 - 1978 |
| Sangathan Mantri, Vidyarthi Parishad, Kashi | Varansi | 1978 - 1982 |
| President, B.J.P. Yuva Morcha, Gorakhpur Mahanagar | Gorakhpur | 1983 - 1985 |
| Pradesh Sanyojak, Janta Vidyarthi morcha | | 1985 - 1988 |
| General Secretary, Jila Sangathan, B.J.P Basti | Basti | 1989 - 1992 |
| Member of Pradesh Karyasamiti, B.J.P | | 1991–Present |
| Member Of Parliament, 10th Loksabha, Khalilabad | Khalilabad | 1991 - 1996 |
| General Secretary, Jila Sangathan, Basti | Basti | 1992 - 1997 |
| Pradesh Sanyojak Kesariya Vahini, B.J.P | | 1992 |
| Vibhag Sanyojak, B.J.P, Basti | Basti | 1998 - 2005 |
| Kshetriya Adyaksh, B.J.P, Gorakhpur | Gorakhpur | 2010 - 2012 |
| Jila Prabhari, B.J.P, Deoria | Deoria | 2012 - 2015 |
| Prabhari, Sangathanatmak Chunav, Bulandshar | Bulandshar | 2017 |
| Prabhari, Nagar Palika Chunav, Hata, Kushinagar | Kushinagar | 2018 |
| Prabhari, Sangathanatmak Chunav, B.J.P Ayodhya | Ayodhya | 2019 - 2020 |
| Member of Rashtriya Parishad | | 2020–Present |

== Personal life ==
He married Smt. Savitri Shukla on 21 June 1978 and they have a son and three daughters. He was a resident of Katar Soyam village for majority of his life. Currently he lives in Basti, Uttar Pradesh. One remarkable milestone he achieved is that all his children are post-graduates in various streams. His son Dr. Vivekanand Shukla holds a Ph.D in Mechanical Engineering from Madan Mohan Malviya University Gorakhpur.
