= Dudhara =

- village
- Location in Uttar Pradesh, India Dudhara (India)
- Coordinates: 26°48′23″N 83°6′15″E
- Country: India
- State: Uttar Pradesh

Languages
  - Official: Hindi
- Time zone: UTC+5:30 (IST)
- PIN: 272125
- Lok Sabha constituency: Sant Kabir Nagar
- Vidhan Sabha constituency: Khalilabad

Dudhara (pronounced as du-dh-aa-ra) Thana, is one of the oldest villages of district Basti (currently falling under Sant Kabir Nagar) in Uttar Pradesh in North India. It is located at 26°54'0N 82°57'0E with an altitude of 75 metres (249 feet).

It is known as Dudhara derived from word Dudhwa (Madhya Pradesh). Further 'Thana' was added to the name as East India Company established the Police Station in the Pre-Independence era. It is believed that the great King of Dudhwa sent his son, the Prince of Dudhwa to this place for expansion and growth of his empire in the 16th century. When the Prince arrived, he had envisioned to develop an ideal and versatile secular State. So he brought along with him people of diverse cultures and professions. Even in the current times, this vision of the Prince seems not to have faded. The place is an example of great unity.

Over a period of time, as Mughal influence expanded in India, Dudhara also grew rich in Islamic culture. Dudhara is famous also due to its historical connection with the great saint, Sant Kabir Das. Sant Kabir spent a significant part of his life in Maghar, Khalilabad, 15 km away from Dudhara. Sant Kabir, as per popular lore, was buried as well as cremated near this place. His Samadhi is present as a proof of this historical connection.

Dudhara, today, is one of the most prominent villages of Sant Kabir Nagar. The local language spoken here is a mixture of Awadhi and Bhojpuri. The nearest river flowing is Ghaghara. Dudhara is a very fertile land and is a rich producer of sugarcane, wheat, rice and gram. Despite being a village Dudhara is well equipped with modern urban facilities like educational centers, hospitals, post office, police station etc. Some of the famous educational institutes are:

1. Abdul Hakeem Inter College - developed under the aid of Dudhwa ancestors.
2. Madarsa Arabia Rehmia - a center of Islamic Studies and Excellence.
3. The Modern Public School [affiliated, English medium, co-educational institute] a center for physical, mental and moral development of a child.
4. Madrsa Islamia lilbnat a centre of Islamic and morden study with together

It was established by Hazi Abdul Waheed, forbidding men.
