= Sriram Chauhan =

Indian politician (born 1953)

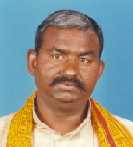
- Chauhan in 1996

Minister of State (Independent Charge) Government of Uttar Pradesh
- In office 21 August 2019 – 25 March 2022
- Chief Minister: Yogi Adityanath
- Ministry & Departments: Horticulture; Agricultural Exports; Agricultural Marketing; Agricultural Foreign Trade

Member of Uttar Pradesh Legislative Assembly
- Incumbent
- Assumed office March 2022
- Preceded by: Sant Prasad
- Constituency: Khajani
- In office March 2017 – March 2022
- Preceded by: Alagu Prasad Chauhan
- Succeeded by: Ganesh Chandra
- Constituency: Dhanghata
- In office June 1991 – December 1992
- Preceded by: Himself
- Succeeded by: Lal Mani Prasad
- Constituency: Hainsarbazar
- In office December 1989 – April 1991
- Preceded by: Genda Devi
- Succeeded by: Himself
- Constituency: Hainsarbazar

Union Minister of State Government of India
- In office 13 October 1999 – 1 September 2001
- Prime Minister: Atal Bihari Vajpayee
- Ministry & Departments: Ministry of Consumer Affairs, Food and Public Distribution (22 November 1999 - 1 September 2001); Ministry of Parliamentary Affairs (13 October 1999 - 22 November 1999)

Member of Parliament, Lok Sabha
- In office May 1996 – May 2004
- Preceded by: Shyam Lal Kamal
- Succeeded by: Lal Mani Prasad
- Constituency: Basti

Personal details
- Born: 20 September 1953 (age 72) Khalilabad, Uttar Pradesh, India
- Party: Bharatiya Janata Party
- Spouse: Gainda Devi (m. 1971)
- Children: 3
- Education: MA in Geography
- Occupation: Politician
- Profession: Politician; agriculturist

Sriram Chauhan (born 20 September 1953) is an Indian politician and member of the 18th Legislative Assembly of Uttar Pradesh representing Khajani constituency. He was the Minister of State, Parliamentary Affairs in 1999 and the Minister of State, Consumer Affairs, Food and Public Distribution from 1999 to 2001 in the Third Vajpayee ministry. He was elected as MP to 13th Lok Sabha from Basti in Uttar Pradesh. He was imprisoned in the Emergency in 1975.

== Personal life ==
Chauhan was born to Ram Naresh and Keshri Devi on 20 September 1953 in Khalilabad city of Basti district (now in Sant Kabir Nagar district) of Uttar Pradesh. He is a post-graduate and was educated at Kisan Snatakottar Mahavidyalaya, Basti. Chauhan married Gainda Devi in October 1971, with whom he has two daughters and a son. He is an agriculturist by profession.

== Political career ==
Chauhan has been a member of the 17th Legislative Assembly of Uttar Pradesh. Since 2017, he has represented the Dhanghata constituency and is a member of the Bhartiya Janata Party. He is a former Member of parliament from Basti (Lok Sabha constituency) three straight times.

In 2017 elections he defeated Samajwadi Party candidate Algoo Prasad by a margin of 16,909 votes.

He has been appointed Minister of State (Independent Charge) in Yogi Adityanath ministry on 21 August 2019.

In 2022 Uttar Pradesh Legislative Assembly election, Chauhan contested from Khajani constituency and defeated rival Rupawati Beldar of Samajwadi Party by 37,101 votes.

== Posts held ==
#	From	To	Position	Comments
01	May 1996	February 1998	Member, 11th Lok Sabha	
02	February 1998	October 1999	Member, 12th Lok Sabha	
03	October 1999	May 2001	Minister of State for Affairs	
04	October 1999	May 2004	Member, 13th Lok Sabha	
05	March 2017	March 2022	Member, 17th Legislative Assembly	
06	August 2019	Incumbent	Minister of State (Independent Charge), Uttar Pradesh Government	
