= K. N. Udupa =

Indian surgeon and academic

- Born: 1920; Udupi, Karnataka, India
- Died: 22 July 1992 (aged 71–72)
- Occupation: Surgeon
- Known for: Conventional and Indian medicine system
- Spouse(s): Lila & Sushma
- Children: One daughter & two sons
- Awards: Padma Shri

Kodethur Narasimha Udupa (1920–1992) was an Indian surgeon, medical administrator, a pioneer of integrative medicine and the founder director of the Institute of Medical Sciences, Banaras Hindu University (BHU). Born in Udupi in the South Indian state of Karnataka, His father was Tamayya Udupa scholar in Sanskrit and Jyotish belonging to Shivalli brahmin community. He passed his bachelor's degree in Ayurvedic Medicine (AMS) from Banares Hindu University, secured his master's degree (MS) from the University of Michigan in 1948 and passed FRCS examination from Canada.

Sir Sunderlal Hospital, Institute of Medical Sciences, Banaras Hindu University.

Starting his career at Mandi district, Himachal Pradesh, Udupa worked at Shimla and Boston. Returning to India in 1956, he resumed his work in Shimla and in 1958, he was appointed as the head of the committee constituted by the Government of India, Committee on the Reform of Education, Practice and Research in Indigenous Systems of Medicine which later came to be known as Udupa Committee. It is reported that the recommendations of the Udupa Committee helped Ayurveda system to claim national status and a name under new nomenclature, Indian Systems of Medicine. After the submission of the committee report, Udupa joined the Ayurveda College of BHU as the principal and professor of surgery in 1959. Under his leadership, the college became a College of Medical Sciences for both conventional and Indian medicine systems and started post graduate course in Ayurveda (MD Ayur). Later, the college was upgraded to Institute of Medical Sciences (IMS) retaining Udupa as its founder director. He had several medical articles to his credit and his efforts were reported to be behind the establishment of a Central Surgical Research Laboratory at IMS and Sir Sunderlal Hospital at BHU.

After retirement from BHU in 1980, he became the university's Professor Emeritus and continued his associations with the Indian Council of Medical Research and WHO. Udupa was married to Lila, a medical nurse, and the couple had one daughter, Anjali. He was remarried with Sushma and adopted her two sons Saurabh and Sachin. He died on 22 July 1992, succumbing to colon cancer.

He was honoured by the Government of India in 1972 with Padma Shri, the fourth highest Indian civilian award.
