= Mahendra Nath Yadav =

MLA Basti Sadar, Uttar Pradesh

Member of the Uttar Pradesh Legislative Assembly
- Incumbent
- Assumed office 10 May 2022
- Preceded by: Dayaram Chaudhary
- Constituency: Basti Sadar

Personal details
- Born: Basti district, Uttar Pradesh
- Party: Samajwadi Party

Mahendra Nath Yadav is currently the MLA of Basti Sadar, in Uttar Pradesh, India. He is a member of the Samajwadi Party. He defeated Dayaram Chaudhary of the Bharatiya Janata Party in the 2022 assembly elections. He is also the District President of Samajwadi Party.

== Personal life ==
Mahendranath Yadav was born in a village named Kalwari Ehtmali (Changahiya) in Basti district. His father's name is Shyamchandra Yadav.

== Education ==
Yadav has completed master's degree from Shivharsh Kisan Degree College.

== Political career ==
He contested the Vidhansabha elections in 2017 on the seat of Basti Sadar, but he lost. From 2005, he was a member of Zilla Panchayat for 10 consecutive years. Has been the president of KDC in 2004. Apart from this, Mahendra Yadav has also held the post of District President of Lohia Vahini along with the District President of SP's Student Assembly.

Mahendra Nath Yadav is currently the MLA of Basti Sadar. He defeated Dayaram Chaudhary of the Bharatiya Janata Party in the 2022 Vidhansabha elections.
