= Khalilabad Assembly constituency =

Constituency of the Uttar Pradesh legislative assembly in India

Coordinates: 26.77°N 83.07°E

Khalilabad
- Constituency No. 313 for the Uttar Pradesh Legislative Assembly

Constituency details
- Country: India
- Region: North India
- State: Uttar Pradesh
- District: Sant Kabir Nagar
- Total electors: 4,27,321
- Reservation: None

Member of Legislative Assembly
- 18th Uttar Pradesh Legislative Assembly
- Incumbent Ankur Raj Tiwari
- Party: Bharatiya Janata Party
- Elected year: 2022

Khalilabad is a constituency of the Uttar Pradesh Legislative Assembly covering the city of Khalilabad in the Sant Kabir Nagar district of Uttar Pradesh, India. Khalilabad is one of five assembly constituencies in the Sant Kabir Nagar Lok Sabha constituency. Since 2008, this assembly constituency is numbered 313 amongst the 403 constituencies of the UP legislative assembly.

Bharatiya Janta Party's Ankur Raj Tiwari is the incumbent MLA since 2022.

== Members of Legislative Assembly ==
#	Term	Member of Legislative Assembly	Party	From	To	Days	Comment
01	1st Vidhan Sabha	Mohd Abdul Moiz Khan	Indian National Congress	May 1952	March 1957	1,776	
02	2nd Vidhan Sabha	Genda Devi	Indian National Congress	April 1957	July 1957		
03	2nd Vidhan Sabha	Raja Ram Sharma	Indian National Congress	July 1957	March 1962		
04	3rd Vidhan Sabha	Genda Devi	Indian National Congress	March 1962	March 1967	1,828	
05	4th Vidhan Sabha	Dhanush Dhari Pandey	Indian National Congress	March 1967	April 1968	402	
06	5th Vidhan Sabha	Dhanush Dhari Pandey	Indian National Congress	February 1969	March 1974	1,832	
07	6th Vidhan Sabha	Laloo Ram	Indian National Congress	March 1974	April 1977	1,153	
08	7th Vidhan Sabha	Ram Asrey Paswan	Janata Party	June 1977	February 1980	969	
09	08th Vidhan Sabha	Ram Asrey Paswan	Janata Party	June 1980	March 1985	1,735	
10	9th Vidhan Sabha	Dawarika Prasad	Indian National Congress	March 1985	November 1989	1,725	
11	10th Vidhan Sabha	Ram Asray Paswan	Janata Dal	December 1989	April 1991	488	
12	11th Vidhan Sabha	Ram Charitar	Bharatiya Janata Party	June 1991	December 1992	533	
13	12th Vidhan Sabha	Ram Prakash	Bharatiya Janata Party	December 1993	October 1995	693	
14	13th Vidhan Sabha	Ram Asrey Paswan	Janata Dal	October 1996	March 2002	1,967	
15	14th Vidhan Sabha	Dawarika Prasad	Bharatiya Janata Party	February 2002	May 2007	1,902	
16	15th Vidhan Sabha	Bhagwandas	Bahujan Samaj Party	May 2007	March 2012	1,762	
17	16th Vidhan Sabha	Mohamed Ayub	Peace Party of India	March 2012	March 2017	1,829	
18	17th Vidhan Sabha	Digvijay Narayan Alis Jay Chaubey	Bhartiya Janata Party	March 2017	March 2022	1,836	
19	18th Vidhan Sabha	Ankur Raj Tiwari	Bhartiya Janata Party	March 2022	Incumbent	1657	

== Election results ==
=== 2027 ===
2027 Uttar Pradesh Legislative Assembly election: Khalilabad
Party	Candidate	Votes	%	±%
INDIA				
NDA				
BSP				
NOTA	None of the above			
Majority				
Turnout				
gain from		Swing		

=== 2022 ===
Bharatiya Janta Party candidate Ankur Raj Tiwari won the 2022 Uttar Pradesh Legislative Elections defeating Samajwadi Party candidate Digvijay Narayan alias Jay Chaubey by a margin of 12,622 votes.

2022 Uttar Pradesh Legislative Assembly election: Khalilabad
Party	Candidate	Votes	%	±%
BJP	Ankur Raj Tiwari	76,086	30.36	▼1.81
SP	Digvijay Narayan alias Jay Chaubey	63,464	25.32	▲12.7
BSP	Aftab Alam	58,368	23.29	▼1.72
AAP	Subodh Chandra Yadav	25,247	10.07	
PECP	Dr Mohammad Ayub	19,364	7.73	▼11.04
NOTA	None of the above	1,259	0.5	▲0.13
Majority		12,622	5.04	▼2.12
Turnout		250,627	54.72	▲2.3
BJP gain from SP		Swing		

=== 2017 ===
2017 General Elections: Khalilabad
Party	Candidate	Votes	%	±%
BJP	Digvijay Narayan alias Jay Chaubey	72,061	32.17	
BSP	Mashhoor Alam Choudhary	56,024	25.01	
PECP	Dr. Mohd. Ayub	42,041	18.77	
SP	Javed Ahmad	28,274	12.62	
RLD	Ganga Singh	6,872	3.07	
CPI	Vijay Kumar Shukla Advocate	2,590	1.16	
AIMIM	Tafsirullah	2,578	1.15	
NOTA	None of the above	835	0.37	
Majority		16,037	7.16	
Turnout		224,008	52.42	
BJP gain from PECP		Swing	▼1.03	

=== 2012 ===
2012 General Elections: Khalilabad
Party	Candidate	Votes	%	±%
PECP	Mohamed Ayub	55,841	27.00	
BSP	Mashhoor Alam Choudhary	50,449	24.39	
BJP	Digvijay Narayan alias Jay Chaubey	43,552	21.06	
SP	Abdul Kalam	27,795	13.44	
INC	Alok alias Sonu Yadav	8,843	4.28	
JD(U)	Krishan Chandra Pandey	3,362	1.63	
	Remainder 13 candidates	16,966	8.20	Steady
Majority		5,392	2.61	
Turnout		2,06,808	54.20	
PECP gain from BSP		Swing		
