= Ram Prasad Chaudhary =

Indian politician (born 1954)

Member of Parliament, Lok Sabha
- Incumbent
- Assumed office 4 June 2024
- Preceded by: Harish Dwivedi
- Constituency: Basti
- In office December 1989 – June 1991
- Preceded by: Chandra Sekhar Tripathi
- Succeeded by: Ashthabhuja Prasad Shukla
- Constituency: Khalilabad

Minister of Food and Civil Supplies & Rental Control Government of Uttar Pradesh
- In office May 2007 – February 2012
- Chief minister: Mayawati
- Succeeded by: Raghuraj Pratap Singh

Member of the Legislative Assembly of Kaptanganj
- In office December 1993 – March 2017 (5 Times)
- Preceded by: Krishan Kinkar Singh Rana
- Succeeded by: Chandra Prakash Shukla

Personal details
- Born: 15 November 1954 (age 72) Jigna, Uttar Pradesh, India
- Party: Samajwadi Party (2020–present), (1991–1996)
- Other political affiliations: Janata Party (1989–1991); Bahujan Samaj Party (1996–2002), (2007–2020); Bhartiya Janta Party (2002–2007)
- Spouse: Kapura Devi
- Children: 3 (including Kavindra Chaudhary)
- Education: Government Polytechnic College, Basti
- Occupation: Farmer
- Profession: Politician
- As on 13 June 2024

Ram Prasad Chaudhary (born 15 November 1954) is an Indian politician and a member of the 9th Lok Sabha, 12th, 13th, 14th, 15th and 16th Legislative Assembly of Uttar Pradesh. He represents the Kaptanganj constituency of Uttar Pradesh and is a member of the Samajwadi Party. He earlier also served as Minister of State (Independent charge) in Mayawati cabinet (1997), Minister of Textile and silk industry in Kalyan Singh government (1997) and Minister of Food and Civil Supplies in Mayawati cabinet (2007–2012). In June 2024, Chaudhary defeated Harish Dwivedi of Bharatiya Janata Party and was elected to Indian Parliament, Lok Sabha from Basti Lok Sabha constituency of Uttar Pradesh.

== Early life and education ==
Chaudhary was born 15 November 1954 in Jigna village in the Basti district of Uttar Pradesh to father Manik Ram Chaudhary in a Kurmi family. In 1978, he attained Diploma in civil and electrical engineering from Government Polytechnic College, Basti. Chaudhary is married to Kapura Devi, with whom he has a son and two daughters. His nephew Arvind Kumar Chaudhary has been also an MP from Basti (Lok Sabha constituency) from 2009 to 2014 as a member of Bahujan Samaj Party. His son Shri Kavindra Chaudhary became MLA from Kaptanganj Assembly in 2022 from Samajwadi Party

== Political career ==
Chaudhary started career as a member of parliament in 9th Lok Sabha from Khalilabad of Sant Kabir Nagar district as a member of Janata Party. After 1993 he was regular five time continuously MLA of Kaptanganj (Assembly constituency) of Basti district till 2017.

In Seventeenth Legislative Assembly of Uttar Pradesh (2017) elections, he lost to Bhartiya Janata Party candidate Chandra Prakash Shukla by a margin of 6,827 votes.

In 2019 general elections, he was candidate of SP and BSP (Mahagathbandhan) from Basti Lok Sabha seat. But he lost the election to BJP's Harish Dwivedi by a margin of 30,354 (2.88%) votes.

In November 2019, BSP supremo Mayawati expelled Chaudhary and three former MLAs from the party for indiscipline and anti-party activities. After the expulsion, Chaudhary joined the Samajwadi Party along with his colleagues in the presence of Samajwadi Party president Akhilesh Yadav in Lucknow.

== Criminal cases ==
According to his election affidavit, Chaudhary has three pending criminal cases against him. In 2023, he was convicted under Section 188 of the Indian Penal Code (punishment for disobedience to an order duly promulgated by a public servant) by the Additional Chief Judicial Magistrate (ACJM), Basti, and has not filed an appeal.

Earlier, he was acquitted by the MP/MLA court in an eight-year-old case registered under Section 171 of the Representation of the People Act, which alleged that he had distributed cash and sarees to influence voters during the 2014 Lok Sabha election campaign. The court exonerated him due to lack of evidence.

== Posts held ==
#	From	To	Position	Comments
01	1989	1991	Member, 9th Lok Sabha	
02	1993	1995	Member, 12th Legislative Assembly of Uttar Pradesh	
03	1996	2002	Member, 13th Legislative Assembly of Uttar Pradesh	
04	2002	2007	Member, 14th Legislative Assembly of Uttar Pradesh	
05	2007	2012	Member, 15th Legislative Assembly of Uttar Pradesh	
06	2012	2017	Member, 16th Legislative Assembly of Uttar Pradesh	
