= Ganesh Chandra Chauhan =

Indian politician

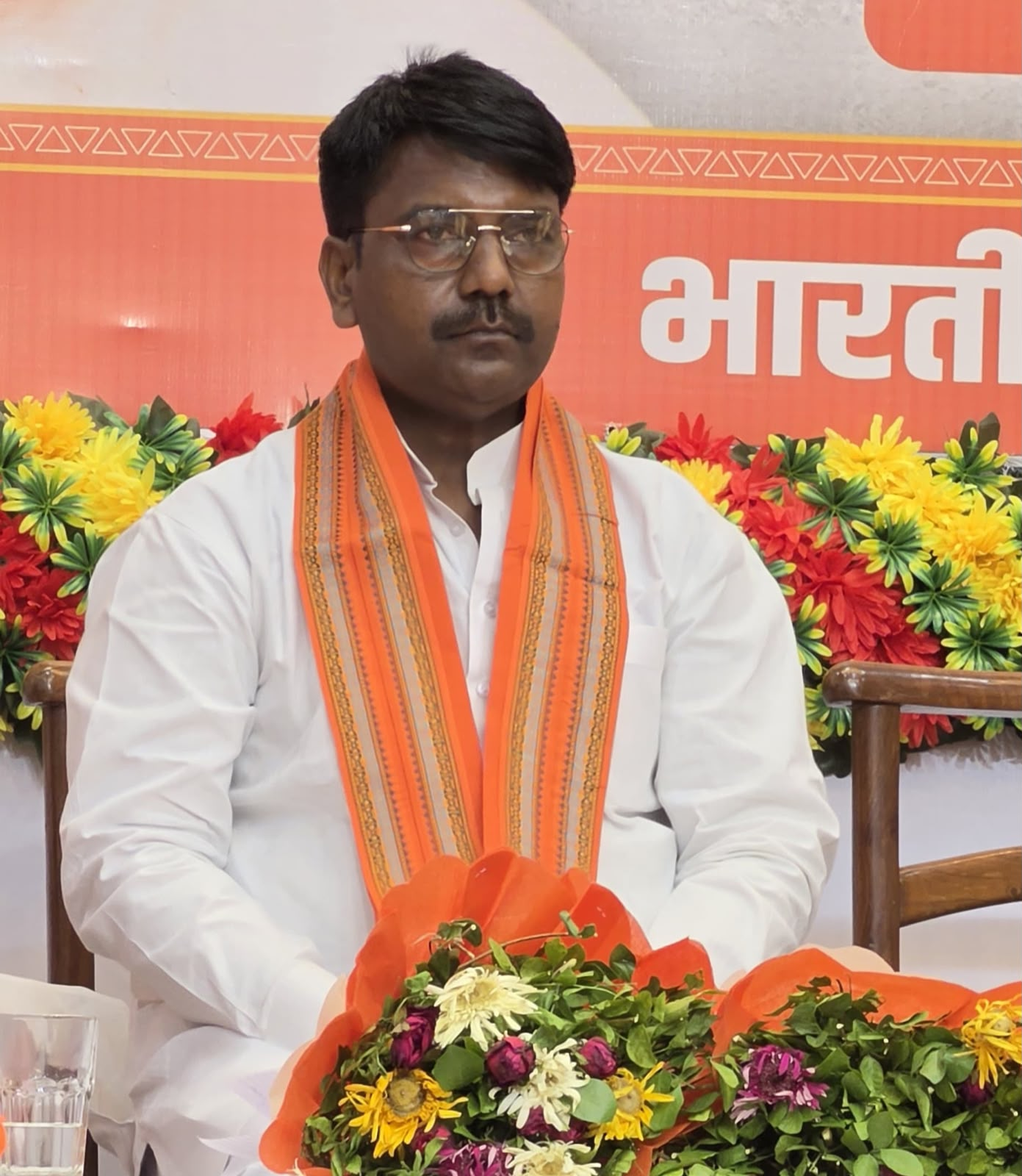
- Chauhan In 2026

Member of the Uttar Pradesh Legislative Assembly
- Incumbent
- Assumed office 10 March 2022
- Preceded by: Alagu Prasad
- Constituency: Dhanghata

Personal details
- Party: Bharatiya Janata Party
- Occupation: Politician

Ganesh Chandra Chauhan is an Indian politician and a member of the Uttar Pradesh Legislative Assembly from the Dhanghata Assembly constituency from 10 March 2022. He was elected on the symbol of Bharatiya Janata Party (BJP)

== Early life and political career ==
Ganesh was a sanitation worker. He won the polls defeating Alagu Prasad of the Suheldev Bharatiya Samaj Party (SBSP) with a margin of 10,553 votes.
