= Bakauli Kala =

- small village
- Location in Uttar Pradesh, India Bakauli Kala (India)
- Coordinates: 26°33′16″N 82°59′36″E
- Country: India
- State: Uttar Pradesh

Languages
  - Official: Hindi
- Time zone: UTC+5:30 (IST)
- PIN: 276162
- Telephone code: 91-5547
- Vehicle registration: UP 58

Bakauli Kala is a village in the tehsil/mandal of Hainsar Bazar in the Sant Kabir Nagar district of Uttar Pradesh, India.

== Demography ==
According to the 2011 India census, In BaKauli Kala Number of Households is 353 and had a population of 2282. Males constituted 1101 of the population, and females 1181 of the population.

== Transportation ==
Bakauli kala is well connected to state highway 72. U.P State Buses are available for Delhi, Lucknow, Gorakhpur, Kanpur, and Allahabad.

== Sarpanch ==
Punam Devi is the current sarpanch of Bakauli kala Panchayat.
