= Kavindra Chaudhary =

Indian politician

Member of Uttar Pradesh Legislative Assembly
- Incumbent
- Assumed office March 2022
- Preceded by: Chandra Prakash Shukla
- Constituency: Kaptanganj

Personal details
- Born: 22 February 1992 (age 34) Sant Kabir Nagar district
- Party: Samajwadi Party
- Spouse: Dr. Shweta Verma (m. 2017)
- Children: 1
- Parent: Ram Prasad Chaudhary (father)
- Education: Diploma in Management
- Occupation: Politician
- Profession: Agriculture & Business

Kavindra Chaudhary is an Indian politician, farmer, and a member of the 18th Uttar Pradesh Assembly from the Kaptanganj Assembly constituency of Basti district. He is a member of the Samajwadi Party.

== Early life and education ==
Kavindra Chaudhary was born on 22 February 1992 in Jigina village, Sant Kabir Nagar district of Uttar Pradesh, to a Hindu family of Ram Prasad Chaudhary. He married Sweta Verma on 15 November 2017, and they have one child.

He attained Diploma in Management degree from Institute Of Management Research & Technology in 2017.

== Political career ==
Chaudhary has inherited a legacy in politics. His father, Ram Prasad Chaudhary, served as an MLA from the Kaptanganj (Assembly constituency) for five consecutive terms and was also a minister in the Mayawati cabinet. He is currently serving as Member of Parliament (MP) from the Basti Lok Sabha constituency.

He started his political career in 2022 elections, he was elected MLA from Kaptanganj Assembly constituency as a member of Samajwadi Party. He defeated his nearest candidate Chandra Prakash Shukla (Bhartiya Janata Party) by a huge margin of 24,179 (11.2%) votes.

== See also ==
- 18th Uttar Pradesh Assembly
- Kaptanganj Assembly constituency
- Uttar Pradesh Legislative Assembly
