= Ledwa Mahua =

Ledwa Mahuwa
- Census town
- Location in Uttar Pradesh, India Ledwa Mahuwa (India)
- Coordinates: 26°56′22″N 83°05′47″E
- Country: India
- State: Uttar Pradesh
- District: Sant Kabir Nagar

Population (2001)
  - Total: 11,524

Languages
  - Official: Hindi
- Time zone: UTC+5:30 (IST)
- Vehicle registration: UP
- Website: up.gov.in

Ledwa Mahua is a census town in Sant Kabir Nagar district in the Indian state of Uttar Pradesh.

== Demographics ==
As of 2001 India census, Ledwa Mahua had a population of 11,524. Males constitute 52% of the population and females 48%. Ledwa Mahua has an average literacy rate of 44%, lower than the national average of 59.5%: male literacy is 52%, and female literacy is 34%. In Ledwa Mahua, 22% of the population is under 6 years of age.
