= Chhapra Magarbi =

- Chhapara Magarvi
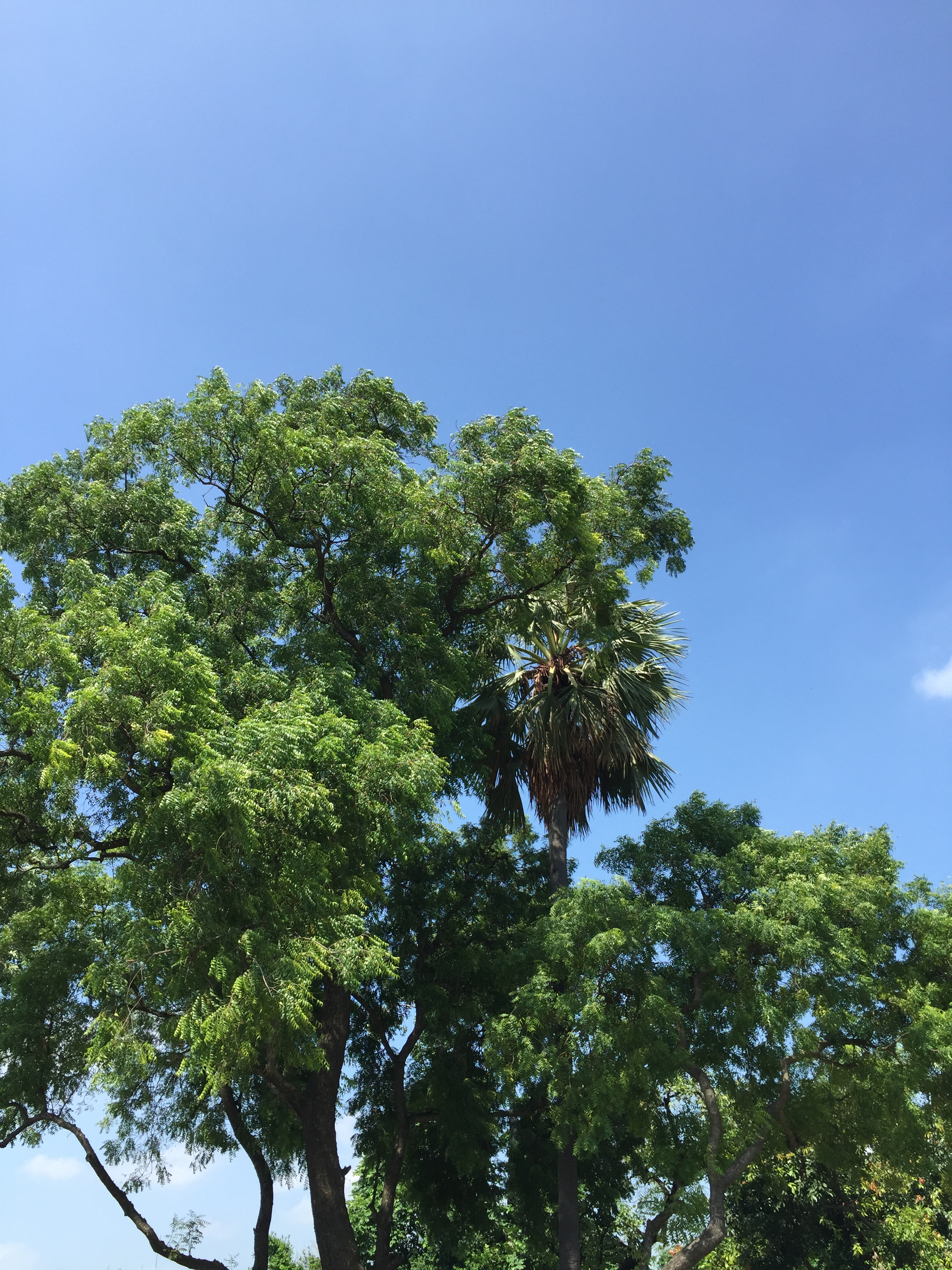
- Green trees at Yadu's home

- Location in Sant Kabir Nagar, Uttar Pradesh, India Chhapra Magarbi (India)
- Coordinates: 26°31′46.8″N 82°57′27.2″E
- Country: India
- State: Uttar Pradesh
- District: Sant Kabir Nagar
- Tehsil: Dhanghata
- Police Station: Dhanghata
- Block: Pauli
- Post Office: Chhapara Magarvi

Languages
  - Official: Hindi
- Time zone: UTC+5:30 (IST)
- PIN: 272162
- Telephone code: 91-5547
- Vehicle registration: UP 58

Chhapra Magarvi is a village in the Dhanghata tehsil of Sant Kabir Nagar district in the Uttar Pradesh state in India.

== See also ==
- Ghanghata
- Sant Kabir Nagar district
