= Basti Assembly constituency =

Former constituency of the Uttar Pradesh legislative assembly in India

Coordinates: 26.85°N 83.34°E

Basti
- Former constituency for the Uttar Pradesh Legislative Assembly

Constituency details
- Country: India
- Region: North India
- State: Uttar Pradesh
- District: Basti
- Lok Sabha constituency: Basti
- Established: 1957
- Abolished: 2012

Basti was one of the constituencies of the Uttar Pradesh Legislative Assembly, in central India. It was a part of the Basti district and one of the assembly constituencies in the Basti Lok Sabha constituency. Basti Assembly constituency came into existence in 1957 and ceased to exist in 2012 after the passing of "Delimitation of Parliamentary and Assembly Constituencies Order, 2008".

== Members of the Legislative Assembly ==
Year	Member	Party
1957	Udai Shankar	Indian National Congress
1962	Rajendra Kishori	Indian National Congress
1967	Kashinath Bahadur Pal	Swatantra Party
1969	Rajendra Kishori	Indian National Congress
1974	Shyama Devi	Indian National Congress
1977	Jagdamba Prasad Singh	Janata Party
1980	Almeloo Ammal	Indian National Congress (I)
1985	Almeloo Ammal	Indian National Congress
1989	Rajmani Pandey	Janata Dal
1991	Lakshmeshwar Singh	Janata Dal
1993	Jagdambika Pal	Indian National Congress
1996	Jagdambika Pal	All India Indira Congress
2002	Jagdambika Pal	Indian National Congress
2007	Jeetendra Kumar	Bahujan Samaj Party
2012 onwards : See Basti Sadar

== See also ==
- Basti
- Basti Lok Sabha constituency
- Uttar Pradesh
