= Raja Lakshmeshwar Singh =

Indian politician

Lakshmeshwar Singh

Member of the Uttar Pradesh Legislative Assembly
- In office 1991–1993
- Preceded by: Rajmani Pandey
- Succeeded by: Jagdambika Pal
- Constituency: Basti

Personal details
- Born: 18-April-1954
- Died: 14 January 2005
- Party: JD
- Spouse: Smt. Aashima Singh
- Children: One son and one daughter

Raja Lakshmeshwar Singh was a Janata Dal politician and a former member of the Uttar Pradesh Legislative Assembly from Basti District, Uttar Pradesh.
