= Digvijay Narayan Chaubey =

Indian politician

MLA in 17th Legislative Assembly of Uttar Pradesh
- In office March 2017 – March 2022
- Preceded by: Mohamed Ayub
- Succeeded by: Ankur Raj Tiwari
- Constituency: Khalilabad (Assembly constituency)

Personal details
- Born: Digvijay Narayan Chaturvedi; 15 October 1970 (age 55) Bhitaha, Sant Kabir Nagar, Uttar Pradesh
- Party: Bharatiya Janata Party
- Education: Diploma in Computer science (Karnataka); Bachelor of Education (Bangalore)
- Occupation: MLA
- Profession: Politician; Agriculture

Digvijay Narayan Chaubey (also known as Jay Chaubey) is an Indian politician who was a member of the 17th Legislative Assembly of Uttar Pradesh in India. He represented the Khalilabad (Assembly constituency) in Sant Kabir Nagar district as a member of the Bharatiya Janata Party.

== Early life and education ==
Chaubey was born 15 October 1970 in Bhitaha village in Sant Kabir Nagar district of Uttar Pradesh to father Gomti Prasad Chaturvedi. In 1994, he married Poonam Chaturvedi, they have two sons named Satyam and Shivam and one daughter Smriti. He belongs to Brahmin family. He earned Diploma in Computer science degree from Karnataka and Bachelor of Education degree from Bangalore.

== Political career ==
Chaubey started his journey of politics in 16th Legislative Assembly of Uttar Pradesh (2012) elections, he got ticket by Bharatiya Janata Party from Khalilabad (Assembly constituency). But he lost to Mohamed Ayub (Peace Party of India) and stood on third with 43,552 (21.06%) votes.

In 17th Legislative Assembly of Uttar Pradesh (2017) elections, he again contested from Khalilabad and won this seat by defeating Bahujan Samaj Party candidate Mashhoor Alam Choudhary by a margin of 16,037 (7.16%) votes.

== Posts held ==
#	From	To	Position	Comments
01	March 2017	March 2022	Member, 17th Legislative Assembly of Uttar Pradesh	
