= Belauli =

Village in Uttar Pradesh, India

- Village
- Location in Uttar Pradesh, India Belauli (India)
- Coordinates: 26.9154°N 83.2058°E
- Country: India
- State: Uttar Pradesh
- District: Sant Kabir Nagar district
- Tehsil: Mehdawal
- Post Office: Belauli

Government
  - Body: Gram panchayat

Languages
  - Official: Hindi
  - Native/Spoken: Bhojpuri
- Time zone: UTC+5:30 (IST)
- PIN: 272271
- Vehicle registration: UP-58
- Lok Sabha constituency: Sant Kabir Nagar
- Vidhan Sabha constituency: Mehdawal
- Nearest city: Gorakhpur
- Website: sknagar.nic.in

Belauli is a village in the Mehdawal tehsil of Sant Kabir Nagar district, Uttar Pradesh state, India.

== Geography ==
Belauli is situated about 17 km from the town of Mehdawal. It is on the eastern side of the Sant Kabir Nagar district, on the western border of Gorakhpur district. The village is approximately 30 km from the city of Gorakhpur.

The river Rapti flows through the village. The people of Belauli have been affected many times by the flood caused by the Rapti river.

== Notable people ==
- Nagendra Nath Tripathi, politician

== See also ==
- Sant Kabir
- Mehdawal
- Sant Kabir Nagar district
- Gorakhpur district
