= Basti Sadar Assembly constituency =

Constituency of the Uttar Pradesh legislative assembly in India

Coordinates: 26.80°N 82.72°E

Basti Sadar
- Constituency No. 310 for the Uttar Pradesh Legislative Assembly

Constituency details
- Country: India
- Region: North India
- State: Uttar Pradesh
- District: Basti
- Reservation: None

Member of Legislative Assembly
- 18th Uttar Pradesh Legislative Assembly
- Incumbent Mahendra Nath Yadav
- Party: Samajwadi Party
- Elected year: 2022

Basti Sadar is a constituency of the Uttar Pradesh Legislative Assembly covering the city of Basti in the Basti district of Uttar Pradesh, India.

Basti Sadar is one of five assembly constituencies in the Basti Lok Sabha constituency. Since 2008, this assembly constituency is numbered 310 amongst 403 constituencies. Samajwadi Party candidate Mahendra Nath Yadav is MLA from this seat since 2022.

== History ==
Constituency known as "Basti" renamed in 2008 as "Basti Sadar"

== Members of Legislative Assembly ==
Year	Member	Party
Before 2012 : See Basti
2012	Jeetendra Kumar	Bahujan Samaj Party
2017	Dayaram Chaudhary	Bharatiya Janata Party
2022	Mahendra Nath Yadav	Samajwadi Party

== Election results ==
=== 2027 ===
2027 Uttar Pradesh Legislative Assembly election: Basti Sadar
Party	Candidate	Votes	%	±%
INDIA				
NDA				
BSP				
NOTA	None of the above			
Majority				
Turnout				
gain from		Swing		

=== 2022 ===
2022 Uttar Pradesh Legislative Assembly election: Basti Sadar
Party	Candidate	Votes	%	±%
SP	Mahendra Nath Yadav	86,029	39.81	▲15.56
BJP	Dayaram Chaudhary	84,250	38.99	▼5.87
BSP	Dr. Alok Ranjan Verma	36,429	16.86	▼7.12
INC	Devendra Kumar Srivastava	4,105	1.9	
NOTA	None of the above	1,320	0.61	▲0.02
Majority		1,779	0.82	▼19.79
Turnout		216,093	58.16	▼1.25
SP gain from BJP		Swing		

=== 2017 ===
2017 General Elections: Basti Sadar
Party	Candidate	Votes	%	±%
BJP	Dayaram Chaudhary	92,697	44.86	
SP	Mahendra Nath Yadav	50,103	24.25	
BSP	Jitendra Kumar	49,538	23.98	
RLD	Raja Ashwarya Raj Singh	4,152	2.01	
NOTA	None of the above	1,206	0.59	
Majority		42,594	20.61	
Turnout		206,622	59.41	
BJP gain from BSP		Swing	+15.48	

=== 2012 ===
2012 General Elections: Basti Sadar
Party	Candidate	Votes	%	±%
BSP	Jitendra Kumar	53,011	29.25	
INC	Abhishek Pal	34,008	18.76	
BJP	Harish Dwivedi	32,121	17.72	
PECP	Dayaram Chaudhary	23,709	13.08	
SP	Chandra Bhushan Mishra	23,369	12.89	
SBSP	Manoj Kumar Rajbhar	3,203	1.77	
Independent	Ajay Mohan Gandhi	1,899	1.05	
	Remainder 13 candidates	9,926	5.48	
Majority		19,003	10.48	
Turnout		1,81,246	58.29	
BSP hold		Swing		
