= List of vice-chancellors of the University of Allahabad =

The vice-chancellor is the executive head of the University of Allahabad.

== Vice-chancellors of University of Allahabad ==
The vice-chancellors of the University of Allahabad are as follows.

List of vice-chancellors
Sl. No.	Name	Term Start	Term End	Remarks
1.	Sir John Edge	1887	1894	
2.	T. Conlan, Esq.	1894	1898	
3.	Mt. Justice R.S. Aikman	1898	1900	
4.	Justice Sir George Knox	1900	1906	
5.	Sir Sunder Lal	1906	1908	
6.	Sir Robert Aikman	1908	1909	
7.	Sir Henry George Richards	1909	1912	
8.	Sir Sunder Lal	1912	1917	
9.	Sir Pramada Charan Banerjee	1917	1919	
10.	Sir Theodore Caro Piggott	1919	1920	
11.	Mr. Justice Gokul Prasad	1920	1922	
12.	Sir Claude de la Fosse	1922	1923	
13.	Mahamahopadhyaya Pt. Ganganatha Jha	1923	1932	
14.	Pandit Iqbal Narain Gurtu	1932	1938	
15.	Dr. Amarnatha Jha	1938	1947	
16.	Dr. Tara Chand	1947	1949	
17.	Dr. Dakshina Ranjan Bhattacharaya	1949	1952	
18.	Professor Amulya Chandra Banerjee	1952	1955	
19.	Shri B. N. Jha	1955	1957	
20.	Dr. Shri Ranjan	1957	1961	
21.	Justice P. K. Kaul	1961	1961	
22.	Dr. Balbhadra Prasad	1961	1965	
23.	Mr. Ratan Kumar Nehru	1965	1968	
24.	Prof A. B. Lal	1968	1971	
25.	Dr. C.M. Bhatia	1971	1972	
26.	Prof. Babu Ram Saxena	1972	1973	
27.	Mr. Ram Sahai	1973	1976	
28.	Dr. P. D. Hajela	1976	1979	
29.	Prof. Adya Prasad	1979	1980	
30.	Prof. U.N. Singh	1980	1983	
31.	Prof. Gobind Chandra Pande	1983	1984	Acting
32.	Dr. R. P. Mishra	1984	1987	
33.	Prof. W.U. Malik	1987	1990	
34.	Prof. T. Pati	1990	1991	Acting
35.	Prof. Ram Charan Mehrotra	1991	1993	
36.	Prof. U.N. Gupta (1993–94)	1993	1994	
37.	Prof. S.C. Srivastava	1994	1997	
38.	Prof. Chunni Lal Khetrapal	1998	2001	
39.	Prof. G.K. Mehta	2001	2004	
40.	Prof. Janak Pandey	2004	2004	Acting
41.	Prof. H. R. Singh	2005	2005	Acting
42.	Prof Rajan Harshe	2005	2010	
43.	Prof. K.G. Srivastava	2010	2010	Acting
44.	Prof. N.R. Farooqi	2010	2010	Acting
45.	Prof. A. K. Singh	2011	2014	
46.	Prof. N.R. Farooqi	2014	2015	Acting
47.	Prof. A. Satyanarayana	2015	2015	Acting
48.	Prof. R. L. Hangloo	2015	2020	
49.	Prof. K. S. Mishra	2020	2020	Acting
50.	Prof. P. K. Sahoo	2020	2020	Acting
51.	Prof. R. R. Tewari	January 2020	November 2020	Acting
52.	Prof. Sangita Srivastava	November 2020	Incumbent	First Woman VC

== See also ==
University of Allahabad
