= Lal Mani Prasad =

Indian politician

Member of Parliament in 14th Lok Sabha
- In office 2004 -2009
- Preceded by: Shriram Chauhan
- Succeeded by: Arvind Kumar Chaudhary
- Constituency: Basti

Personal details
- Born: 1 January 1954 (age 72) Basti, Uttar Pradesh
- Party: Bahujan Samaj Party
- Spouse: Ratna Devi
- Children: 1 son and 1 daughter
- As of 17 September, 2006

Lal Mani Prasad (born 1 January 1954) is an Indian politician for the Basti (Lok Sabha constituency) in Uttar Pradesh.
