= Nagendra Nath Tripathi =

Indian politician

- नागेन्द्र नाथ त्रिपाठी

Regional General Secretary (Organisation) of Bharatiya Janata Party, Bihar-Jharkhand Region
- Incumbent
- Assumed office 2021

General Secretary (Organisation) of Bharatiya Janata Party, Bihar
- In office 2011–2021
- Succeeded by: Bhikhubhai Dalsania

General Secretary (Organisation) of Bharatiya Janata Party, Uttar Pradesh
- In office 2003–2011
- Succeeded by: Sunil Bansal

Personal details
- Born: 4 January 1955 (age 71) Belauli, Basti, Uttar Pradesh, India (now Belauli, Sant Kabir Nagar, Uttar Pradesh, India)
- Party: Bharatiya Janata Party
- Parent(s): Girija Pati Tripathi (father); Ganesha Devi (mother)
- Occupation: Politician
- Website: www.nagendranath.in

Nagendra Nath Tripathi is an Indian politician currently serving as the Regional General Secretary (Organization) of the Bharatiya Janata Party Bihar-Jharkhand region. He has been a pracharak for the Rashtriya Swayamsevak Sangh. He forms a bridge between Rashtriya Swayamsevak Sangh and Bharatiya Janata Party.

== Early life and political career ==
Nagendra Nath Tripathi was born on 1 March 1955 in Belauli village of Sant Kabir Nagar (then a part of Basti), Uttar Pradesh. Born into a family of farmers, he is the eldest among the five children to Girjapati Tripathi and Ganesha Devi. During his higher secondary school days in Basti, he joined the local shakha of the Rashtriya Swayamsevak Sangh as a swayamsevak(member).

He went on to become a full-time pracharak, poornkaalik. He was then transferred to Bharatiya Janata Party (BJP). After serving for a long period of about eight years as the General Secretary (Organisation) of the BJP Uttar Pradesh unit, and then as the General Secretary (Organisation) of the BJP Bihar Pradesh unit.
