= Chandra Prakash Shukla =

Indian politician

MLA, 17th Legislative Assembly of Uttar Pradesh
- Incumbent
- Assumed office March 2017
- Preceded by: Ram Prasad Chaudhary
- Succeeded by: Kavindra Chaudhary
- Constituency: Kaptanganj (Assembly constituency)

Personal details
- Born: 5 July 1968 (age 58) Basti, Uttar Pradesh
- Party: Bharatiya Janata Party
- Spouse: Asha Shukla (m. 1986)
- Children: [[]]
- Education: Chartered accountant
- Alma mater: Institute of Chartered Accountants of India
- Occupation: MLA
- Profession: Chartered accountant

Chandra Prakash Shukla (born 5 July 1968) is an Indian politician and a member of 17th Legislative Assembly of Uttar Pradesh of India. He represents the Kaptanganj constituency of Uttar Pradesh and is a member of the Bharatiya Janata Party.

== Early life and education ==
Shukla was born 5 July 1968 in Basti district of Uttar Pradesh to father Arjun Prasad Shukla. On 23 May 1986, he married Asha Shukla, with whom he has two daughters. He graduated as a Chartered Accountant from Institute of Chartered Accountants of India, New Delhi in 1999. Apart from being a chartered accountant, he is the chairman of "Timecity Group".

== Political career ==
Shukla has been a member of the 17th Legislative Assembly of Uttar Pradesh. Since 2017, he has represented the Kaptanganj constituency and is a member of the BJP. In 2017 elections, he defeated Bahujan Samaj Party candidate Ram Prasad Chaudhary by a margin of 6,827 votes.

== Posts held ==
#	From	To	Position	Comments
01	March 2017	March 2022	Member, 17th Legislative Assembly of Uttar Pradesh	
