= Institute of Medical Sciences, Banaras Hindu University =

Medical school in Varanasi, India

Coordinates: 25°16′30″N 82°59′58″E

Institute of Medical Sciences, BHU
- चिकित्सा विज्ञान संस्थान, का.हि.वि
- Other name: IMS-BHU
- Motto: Chikitsitat punyatmam na kinchita
- Motto in English: No virtue greater than treatment
- Type: Medical education and research institute
- Established: 1960; 66 years ago
- Affiliations: National Medical Commission
- Academic affiliations: Banaras Hindu University
- Budget: ₹728.03 crore (US$76 million)
- Director: Dr. Satya Narayan Sankhwar
- Academic staff: 248
- Undergraduates: 500
- Postgraduates: 564
- Doctoral students: 138
- Location: Varanasi, Uttar Pradesh, India
- Campus: Urban
- Website: www.bhu.ac.in/ims
- Government of India (MoHFW)

Organisation
- Type: Teaching hospital

Services
- Standards: NMC
- Emergency department: Level I Trauma Center
- Beds: 1,600 appx

Helipads
- Helipad: Yes

Institute of Medical Sciences, Banaras Hindu University

The Institute of Medical Sciences (IMS-BHU) is a medical school and one of the six institutes of Banaras Hindu University in Varanasi, India. It comprises three faculties, Faculty of Medicine, Dental Sciences, and Ayurveda. It is a highly ranked prestigious medical institute of the country.

The Institute of Medical Sciences is the medical school of the university. Like other institutions forming BHU, it is residential and co-educational. In 2018, it was upgraded to the status of AIIMS by the Government of India.

== History ==
The Institute started functioning as College of Medical Sciences in 1960 with nine departments of Modern Medicine and eight departments of Ayurveda, under the leadership of K. N. Udupa, the Founder Director of the institute.

In 1971, the College of Medical Sciences, was upgraded to Institute of Medical Sciences. Today it has 33 departments of Modern Medicine including 10 Departments of Super-specialties, four Departments of dentistry, eleven Departments of Ayurveda and a school of Nursing.

== Academics ==
The institute is affiliated to Banaras Hindu University and offers medical and paramedical courses at the undergraduate and postgraduate levels. Admission in BAMS, MBBS and BDS courses is on the basis of merit through NEET. Admission in Nursing courses is through exams conducted on university level. It has 45 departments under three faculties.

== Campus ==
Sir Sundarlal Hospital, Institute Of Medical Sciences, Banaras Hindu University

The campus of IMS lies at the front part of university. The campus contains the medical college, the hospital, the student and resident hostels, the staff quarters, a post office, a temple (BHU Vishwanathji), playgrounds and sporting fields. While the hospital section of the campus is typically crowded and busy, the residential part of the campus is quiet and idyllic punctuated with small parks.

== Hospital ==
The institute has a 1500 bed plus (as of 2017) Super specialty hospital called the Sir Sunderlal Hospital.

== Organization ==
IMS is not under the direct administrative control of the Ministry of Health and Family Welfare, Government of India, but under Banaras Hindu University, an autonomous central university. The three functions of the institute are to impart quality education in undergraduate and postgraduate medical and paramedical courses, to be a trend-setter in medical research and to offer patient care of high order.

The institute is headed by the Director as the chief executive charged with responsibility of running the institute and the hospital. The Deans of the faculties help the Director in coordinating academic activities of the institute, including teaching and research. There are 28 academic departments headed by the Heads of the Departments. Ancillary hospital service is under the direct supervision of the Medical Superintendent with the individual units supervised by technical heads.

Satya Narayan Sankhwar is the director of the institute.

== Rankings ==
University rankings

Medical – India
- NIRF (2024): 7
- India Today (2024): 6

The IMS-BHU was ranked seventh among medical college in India in the National Institutional Ranking Framework 2024, sixth in 2024 by India Today and second in 2024 by Outlook India.

== Student life ==
The campus has three hostels for undergraduate men named Punarvasu Atrey Hostel, Ruiya Medical Hostel and Dhanwntri Hostel, and four hostels for postgraduate men named Old P. G. Hostel, New P.G. Hostel, Sushruta hostel Ruiya Annexe. and Married Doctors Hostel. Undergraduate and postgraduate women live in Sukanya Hostel, New Doctors Girls Hostel and Nagarjuna hostel respectively. All hostels run their own messes.

=== Awards and Medals ===
- Bhagwandas Thakurdas Chandwani Gold Medal is given to the student standing first in MBBS at the IMS-BHU.

=== Student activities ===
The inter-collegiate cultural, literary and sports festival of IMS is called Elixir and is held in mid-October every year. Both the undergraduate men's hostels and the undergraduate women's hostel hold annual hostel days.

== Notable alumni ==
- Sumita Prabhakar
- Sapam Budhichandra Singh
- Radha Mohan Das Agarwal
- Mohamed Ayub
- Ram Harsh Singh

== Upgradation ==
Government of India had decided to upgrade the institute on lines of All India Institute of Medical Sciences as part of phase-1 of Pradhan Mantri Swasthya Suraksha Yojana (PMSSY) whereby the Central Government will bear 80% of the cost of up gradation and 20% cost will be borne by State Government. The up-gradation work is complete.

== See also ==
- List of educational institutions in Varanasi
