= Kaptanganj Assembly constituency =

Constituency of the Uttar Pradesh legislative assembly in India

Coordinates: 26.93°N 83.71°E

Kaptanganj
- Constituency No. 308 for the Uttar Pradesh Legislative Assembly

Constituency details
- Country: India
- Region: North India
- State: Uttar Pradesh
- District: Basti
- Total electors: 3,65,410
- Reservation: None

Member of Legislative Assembly
- 18th Uttar Pradesh Legislative Assembly
- Incumbent Kavindra Chaudhary
- Party: Samajwadi Party
- Elected year: 2022

Kaptanganj is a constituency of the Uttar Pradesh Legislative Assembly covering the city of Kaptanganj in the Basti district of Uttar Pradesh, India.

Kaptanganj is one of five assembly constituencies in the Basti Lok Sabha constituency. Since 2008, this assembly constituency is numbered 308 amongst 403 constituencies.

== Members of Legislative Assembly ==
Year	Member	Party
1974	Ram Lakhan	Indian National Congress
1977	Milan Singh	Janata Party
1980	Ambika Singh	Indian National Congress (I)
1985	Ambika Singh	Indian National Congress
1989	Krishan Kinkar Singh	Independent
1991	Krishan Kinkar Singh	Independent
1993	Ram Prasad Chaudhary	Samajwadi Party
1996	Ram Prasad Chaudhary	Bahujan Samaj Party
2002	Ram Prasad Chaudhary	Bharatiya Janata Party
2007	Ram Prasad Chaudhary	Bahujan Samaj Party
2012	Ram Prasad Chaudhary	Bahujan Samaj Party
2017	Chandra Prakash Shukla	Bharatiya Janata Party
2022	Kavindra Chaudhary	Samajwadi Party

== Election results ==
=== 2027 ===
2027 Uttar Pradesh Legislative Assembly election: Kaptanganj
Party	Candidate	Votes	%	±%
INDIA				
NDA				
BSP				
NOTA	None of the above			
Majority				
Turnout				
gain from		Swing		

=== 2022 ===
2022 Uttar Pradesh Legislative Assembly election: Kaptanganj
Party	Candidate	Votes	%	±%
SP	Kavindra Chaudhary	94,273	43.66	
BJP	Chandra Prakash Shukla	70,094	32.46	▼2.61
BSP	Zaheer Ahmad	40,381	18.7	▼12.97
INC	Ambika Singh	3,527	1.63	▼28.27
NOTA	None of the above	1,221	0.57	▼0.38
Majority		24,179	11.2	▲7.8
Turnout		215,925	59.09	▲0.92
SP gain from BJP		Swing		

=== 2017 ===
This seat belonged to Bharatiya Janta Party candidate Chandra Prakash Shukla who won in last Assembly election of 2017 Uttar Pradesh Legislative Elections defeating Bahujan Samaj Party candidate Ram Prasad Chaudhary by a margin of 6,827 votes.

2017 General Elections: Kaptanganj
Party	Candidate	Votes	%	±%
BJP	Chandra Prakash Shukla	70,527	35.07	
BSP	Ram Prasad Chaudhary	63,700	31.67	
INC	Krishna Kinkar Singh Rana	60,142	29.9	
NOTA	None of the above	1,898	0.95	
Majority		6,827	3.4	
Turnout		201,124	58.17	
BJP gain from BSP		Swing	▼0.69	

=== 2012 ===
2012 General Elections: Kaptanganj
Party	Candidate	Votes	%	±%
BSP	Ram Prasad Chaudhary	67,416	36.05	−
SP	Trayambak Nath	56,346	30.13	−
INC	Krishna Kinkar Singh Rana	46,636	24.94	−
BJP	Ganesh Narayan Mishra	5,741	3.07	
	Remainder 11 candidates	10,853	5.80	−
Majority		11,070	5.92	
Turnout		1,86,992	59.66	
BSP hold		Swing		
