= Rajmani Pandey =

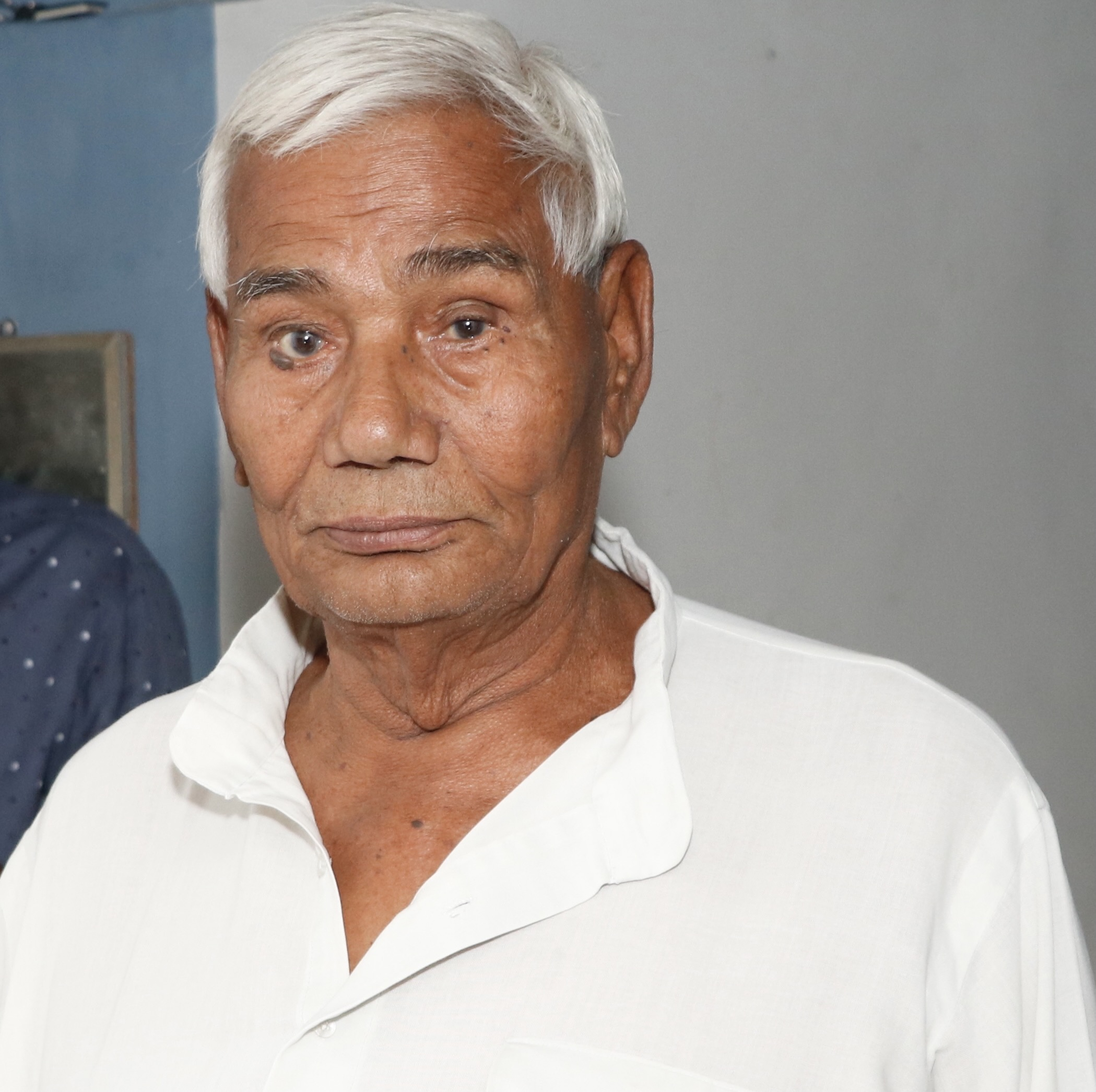
Rajmani Pandey

Rajmani Pandey राजमणि पाण्डेय (born 12 November 1943) is an Indian politician who was a member of 10th Legislative Assembly of Uttar Pradesh. He was elected as MLA from 168, Basti Sadar constituency of District Basti Uttar Pradesh as a candidate of Janta Dal in 1989.

== Personal life and education ==
He was born in 1943, into a Brahmin family of Rampur Rewati Village of Basti District, India. His father was Divakar Pandey.

Rajmani Pandey married at the age of 17, in 1960. He has a son, Dr. Ajay Pandey, and a daughter, Saraswati Pandey.

He completed his schooling at Basti and moved to Gorakhpur University for higher education. He received his B.Ed, MA (Sociology and Political Science), and LLB at Gorakhpur University.

== Political career ==
His political career began at Gorakhpur University where he participated in Chatra Andolan, Majdor Andolan, Kisan Andolan. He was president of Gorakhpur University Student Union in 1972-1973.

He was imprisoned in Basti, Gorakhpur, Gonda, Lucknow, Tihar prisons for a total of 6 years. During the emergency, he was in prison for more than 19 months in Misa.

He became president and All-India general secretary of Samajwadi Yuva Jan Sabha U.P. and also president of Mandi Samiti, Basti.

He ran in UP Assembly election in 1980 as a candidate of JNP (SR) from Basti constituency and was 3rd in the vote, with 13,983 votes. He again participated in the 1985 UP assembly election as a candidate of the LKD from Basti constituency and stood second with 26,191 votes. He was elected as MLA of Basti Sadar in 10th Assembly Election of UP in 1989 as candidate of Janta Dal. He defeated Ex-Chief Minister of UP and candidate of Indian National Congress Jagadambika Pal by 22,783 votes getting 52,530 votes. He was MLA of Basti Sadar from December 1989 through April 1991. He joined Samajwadi Party and ran as candidate of Samajwadi party from Basti Sadar in 14th Assembly election in 2007 but lost to the candidate of BSP Jitendra Chaudhary.
