= Sumita Prabhakar =

Gynecologist and activist (b. 1970)

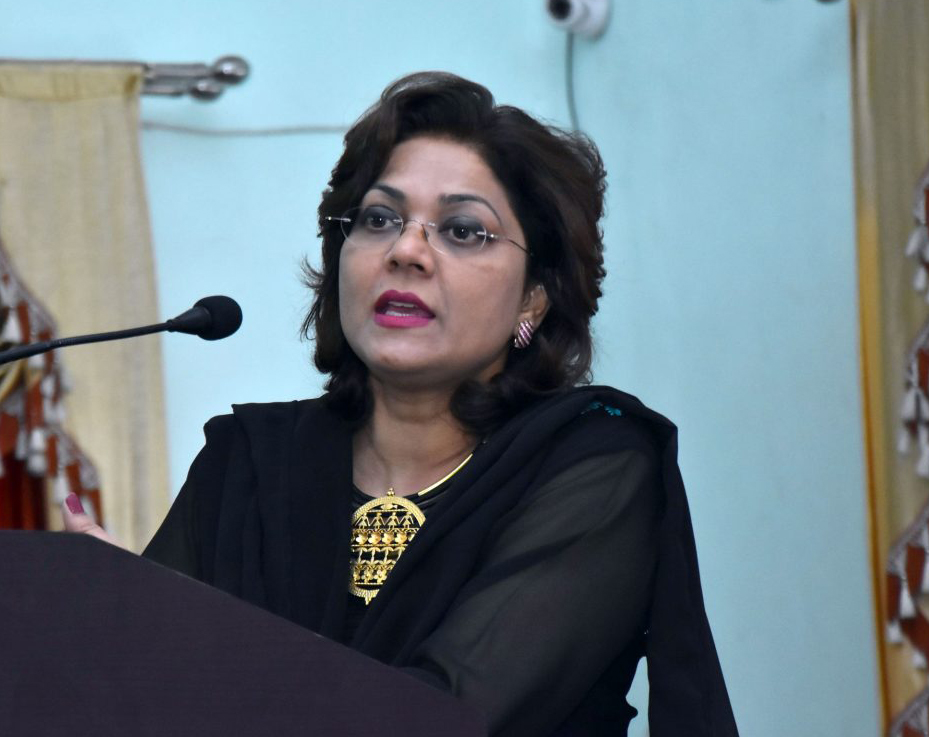
- Prabhakar at Breast Cancer Awareness Program 2017
- Born: 12 May 1970 (age 56); Rishikesh, India
- Education: Kendriya Vidyalaya, Rishikesh
- Alma mater: Institute of Medical Sciences, Banaras Hindu University; Royal College of Obstetricians and Gynaecologists
- Occupation: Doctor
- Spouse: Gurdeep Singh
- Website: www.sumitaprabhakar.com

Sumita Prabhakar is an Indian gynecologist, obstetrics and social medico activist. She served as a president of Federation of Obstetric and Gynaecological Societies of India member body of Dehradun.

== Early life and education ==
Her mother was a teacher and father was an administrative officer in IDPL. She did her schooling from Kendriya Vidhyala IDPL. In 1993, she completed her MB BS from Banaras Hindu University, Varanasi, India .She completed MD (Obs & Gynae), in 1996, later earned her MRCOG (London) from Royal College of Obstetricians and Gynaecologists. She went on to practice at Queen Elizabeth Hospital Malaysia from 1997 to 2001.

== Career ==
Sumita after practicing at Queen Elizabeth Hospital in Malaysia, returned to India, and started practicing at Sitaram Bhartia Institute of Science and Research, Delhi as consultant gynecologist from 2001 to 2002. She serves as the Head of Gynecology at CMI Hospital, Dehradun. She has been organizing free screening and awareness camps for Breast and Cervical cancer since 2014.

Prabhakar is the founder, executive director of IVF India CARE, which she started in Dehradun in 2004. She is the Founder of Colposcopy center for cervical cancer screening - It is the only center recognized for training of Doctors for colposcopy by FOGSI in Uttarakhand established in 2002. She has been the founder president of Can Protect Foundation, an NGO working towards women's health, breast and cervical prevention and awareness.

As president of Can Protect Foundation, Sumita is highly active in organizing a free screening, educational and training camps for the prevention and awareness of breast and cervical cancer in Uttarakhand and nearby states. She is the founder of Asha ki Kiran campaign, which aims to provide free training and sensitization of Asha and Anganwadi workers for the prevention of breast and cervical cancer.

She is now an honorary Fellow of Royal College of Obstetricians and Gynaecologists (FRCOG) of London.

== Personal life ==
She has one son. Her husband's name is Gurdeep Singh, he is an orthopedic surgeon.

== Honors ==
- IMA Doctor Achievement Award by Indian Medical Association in recognition of distinguished service in the field of Medicine in 2008
- Uma Shakti Samman by Governor of Uttarakhand in recognition of distinguished service in the field of Women's health in 2013
- Global Business and Excellence Award by Amar Singh in recognition of distinguished service in the field of infertility treatment
- Youth Icon Award in recognition of distinguished service in spreading awareness about menstrual hygiene and breast cancer in 2014
- Amar Ujala Samarpan aur Samman by Amar Ujala Publications in recognition of distinguished social service in the field of women's healthcare in 2014.
- Health Icon Award by Times of India in recognition of distinguished service of women's healthcare in hilly areas of Uttarakhand
- Divine Shakti Leadership Award by Swami Chidananda of Parmarth Ashram in recognition of distinguished work for breast and cervical cancer prevention in remote areas of Uttarakhand.
- Dainik Jagran featured her in Uttarakhand's Medical Pillars in 2018.
- Medico-Social Activist Award by Indian Medical Association Uttaracon 2018 in recognition for her exemplary contribution, commitments, and dedicated service to the medical profession and society.
