= Arvind Kumar Chaudhary =

Indian politician

Member of Parliament in 15th Lok Sabha
- In office 2009–2014
- Preceded by: Lal Mani Prasad
- Succeeded by: Harish Dwivedi
- Constituency: Basti

Personal details
- Born: Jigina, Sant Kabir Nagar, Uttar Pradesh, India
- Party: Bharatiya Janata Party 2026-present Bahujan Samaj Party till 2026
- Parent: Raj Baran Chaudhary
- Education: Intermediate from Allahabad University
- Occupation: Member of Parliament
- Profession: Politician

Arvind Maihar Kumar Chaudhary is an Indian politician, belonging to Samajwadi Party. In the 2009 election he was elected to the Lok Sabha from Basti in Uttar Pradesh.

== Political career ==
Arvind Kumar Chaudhary has been a member of parliament in 15th Lok Sabha. In General Election 2009, he has represented the Basti constituency and is a member of the Bahujan Samaj Party. He defeated Samajwadi Party candidate Raj Kishor Singh by record margin of 1,05,210 votes.

== Posts held ==
#	From	To	Position	Comments
01	2009	2014	Member, 15th Lok Sabha	
