= Harish Dwivedi =

Indian politician (born 1973)

Harish Chandra Dwivedi

National General Secretary of Bharatiya Janata Party
- Incumbent
- Assumed office 17 August 2026
- President: Nitin Nabin

Member of Parliament, Lok Sabha
- In office 16 May 2014 – 4 June 2024
- Preceded by: Arvind Kumar Chaudhary
- Succeeded by: Ram Prasad Chaudhary
- Constituency: Basti

Personal details
- Born: 22 October 1973 (age 52) Teliyajot, Uttar Pradesh, India
- Citizenship: India
- Party: Bharatiya Janata Party
- Spouse: Vineeta Dwivedi (m. 2006)
- Children: Kushagra Dwivedi, Avantika Dwivedi
- Parents: Late Sadhu Sharan Dubey; Yashoda Devi
- Education: M.A. in Political science
- Alma mater: Deen Dayal Upadhyay Gorakhpur University
- Occupation: Politician
- Profession: Agriculturist
- As on 1 May 2020

Harish Dwivedi (born 22 October 1973) is an Indian politician and a member of 16th and 17th Lok Sabha from the Basti as a member of Bharatiya Janata Party. He is currently the National Secretary of Bharatiya Janta Party.

== Early life and education ==
Dwivedi was born 22 October 1971 in the Teliyajot village in Basti district of Uttar Pradesh to his father Sadhu Sharan Dubey and mother Yashoda Devi. In 2006, he married Vineeta Dwivedi, they have one son and one daughter. He belongs to Brahmin family. In 1998, he attended Deen Dayal Upadhyay Gorakhpur University and attained M.A. in Political science degree.

== Political career ==
Dwivedi was Member of Parliament from two strength terms. He started his political career in 16th Legislative Assembly of Uttar Pradesh (2012) elections from Basti Sadar (Assembly constituency), but he lost to Bahujan Samaj Party candidate Jitendra Kumar and stood third with 32,121 votes.

In 16th Lok Sabha (2014 Indian general election), he got Lok Sabha ticket by Bharatiya Janata Party from Basti (Lak Sabha constituency) and he was elected for the first time as Member of Parliament. He defeated Samajwadi Party candidate Brij Kishor Singh "Dimpal" by a margin of 33,562 (3.20%) votes.

In 17th Lok Sabha (2019 Indian general election), he again was elected Member of Parliament second time continuously from Basti (Lok Sabha constituency). He defeated Bahujan Samaj Party candidate Ram Prasad Chaudhary by a margin of 30,354 (2.88%) votes.

== Posts held ==
- 2014-2019 - member, 16th Lok Sabha.
  - 2014-incumbent - member, Standing Committee on Energy
  - 2014-2019 - member, Consultative Committee, Ministry of Coal
  - 2016-2018 - member, Standing Committee on Information Technology
  - 2018-2019 - member, Standing Committee on Finance
- 2019-2024 - member, 17th Lok Sabha (2nd term)
  - Chairman, Committee on Petitions (Loksabha)
  - Member, Consultative Committee, Ministry of Road Transport and Highways
  - Member Committee on Estimate
- 2024–present - Incharge-Assam (BJP)
- Former National Secretary (BJP)
