= Ghanghata =

- Location in Uttar Pradesh, India Ghanghata (India)
- Coordinates: 26°33′15.10″N 83°0′29.02″E
- Country: India
- State: Uttar Pradesh
- District: Sant Kabir Nagar

Area
  - Total: 653.17 km^{2} (252.19 sq mi)

Languages
  - Official: Hindi
- Time zone: UTC+5:30 (IST)
- PIN: 272162
- Telephone code: 91-5547
- Vehicle registration: UP 58
- Website: up.gov.in

Ghanghata is a village and tehsil in the Sant Kabir Nagar district in the Uttar Pradesh state in India. It is one of three tehsils in the Sant Kabir Nagar district.

== Demography ==
In 2011 Ghanghata had a total population of 425,101, of which males constituted 214,258 (50.4%) of the population, and females 210,843 (49.6%), according to India census. In 2021 the population had increased to 641,851.

== Towns and villages ==
There is one town and 579 villages in Ghanghata Tehsil, including:

- Chhapra Magarbi
- Lutuhi
