= Sir Sunderlal Hospital =

- Banaras Hindu University
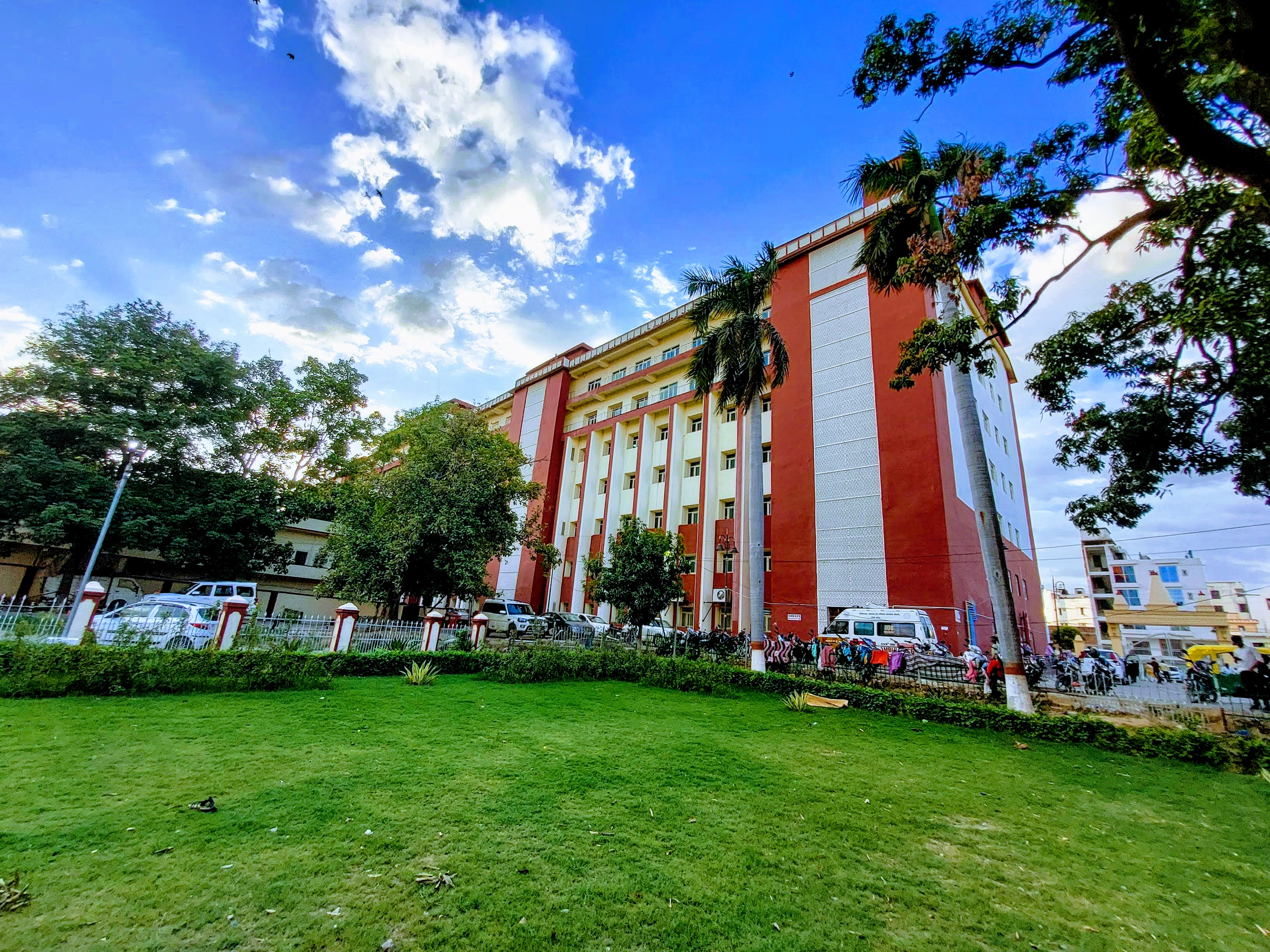
- One of the buildings of SSH-BHU

Geography
- Location: Banaras Hindu University Campus, Varanasi, Uttar Pradesh, India
- Coordinates: 25.2767°N 82.9998°E

Organisation
- Type: Trauma centre, Super specialty hospital
- Affiliated university: Institute of Medical Sciences, Banaras Hindu University
- Patron: Vice-Chancellor of Banaras Hindu University

Services
- Standards: AIIMS
- Emergency department: Super Specialty and Trauma
- Beds: 1500+

History
- Founded: 1926

Links
- Website: Official website

Sir Sunderlal Hospital (SSH-BHU) is a teaching hospital affiliated with the Institute of Medical Sciences, Banaras Hindu University (IMS-BHU), Varanasi, the 7th ranked medical college in India according to NIRF 2024 Rankings. Located on the BHU campus, it is the largest tertiary referral hospital in Eastern Uttar Pradesh state. In 2018, it was upgraded to the status of AIIMS by the Government of India.

== History ==
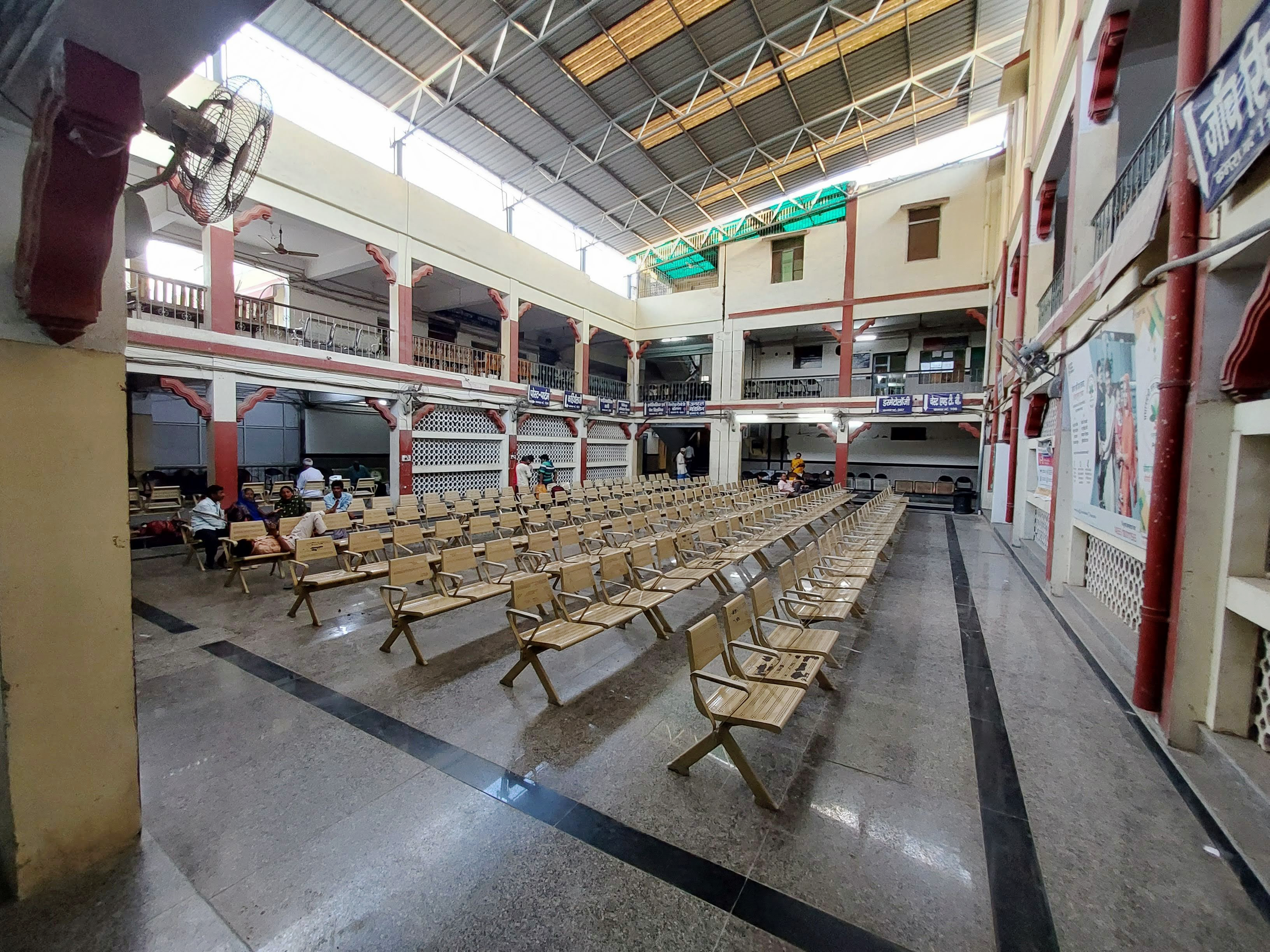
Waiting Hall (OPD), Sir Sunderlal Hospital, Banaras Hindu University

Sir Sunderlal Hospital was established in 1926 and is named for the first Vice Chancellor of BHU, Sir Sunder Lal. It has grown from its initial size of 96 beds to 1500 plus beds as of 2017.
