= Bhalchandra Yadava =

Indian politician (1958–2019)

Bhalchandra Yadav

Member of Parliament for Khalilabad
- In office May 2004 – May 2009
- Succeeded by: Bhismshankar Tiwari
- In office October 1999 – May 2004
- Preceded by: Indrajeet Mishra
- Constituency: Khalilabad

Personal details
- Born: 1 July 1958 Basti, Uttar Pradesh
- Died: 4 October 2019 (aged 61) Medanta-The Medicity, Gurgaon, Haryana, India
- Party: Bahujan Samaj Party (BSP)
- Spouse: Phoola Yadav
- Children: 2 sons subodh yadav pramod yadav and 1 daughter vibha yadav
- As of 17 September, 2006

Bhalchandra Yadav (1 July 1958 - 4 October 2019) was a twice elected Indian politician and Member of Parliament Khalilabad (Lok Sabha constituency) in Uttar Pradesh.
