= Sunder Lal (lawyer) =

Indian lawyer (1857–1918)

Rai Bahadur Sunder Lal
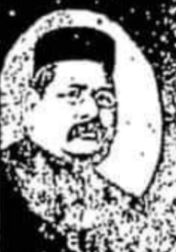
- Portrait of Sir Sunder Lal

1st Vice-Chancellor of Banaras Hindu University
- In office 1 April 1916 – 1918
- Preceded by: Office established
- Succeeded by: Sir P. S. Sivaswami Iyer

Vice-Chancellor of Allahabad University
- In office 1912–1916

Lawyer at Allahabad High Court

Personal details
- Born: 21 May 1857 Jaspur, North-Western Provinces, Company Raj (now in Uttarakhand, India)
- Died: 13 February 1918 (aged 60) Allahabad, United Provinces of Agra and Oudh, British India (now in Uttar Pradesh, India)
- Education: Muir Central College
- Occupation: Jurist; Academic Administrator
- Known for: Founding Vice-Chancellor of the Banaras Hindu University

Rai Bahadur Sir Sunder Lal CIE was born in Jaspur, near Nainital, on 21 May 1857.

In 1876, he joined Muir Central College at Allahabad then led by Augustus Harrison. While an under-graduate Pandit Sunder Lal passed the Vakil's Examination of the High Court in 1880 and was enrolled as a Vakil on 21 December 1880. He practiced in Allahabad High Court. In 1896 the High Court raised him to the rank and status of Advocate.

The distinction of 'Rai Bahadur' was conferred on him in 1905. He was appointed a CIE in 1907. In 1909 he accepted a seat on the Bench of the Judicial Commissioner's Court at Lucknow for a few months and in 1914 for brief periods officiated as a Judge of the Allahabad High Court.

Appointed Member, Council of Law Reporting, Allahabad; Member of the Board of the Allahabad Court to represent Vakils, 1893; enrolled as Advocate, 1893; Fellow Allahabad University, since 1888 Member of the Syndicate, 1895, represented University in U.P. Legislative Council, 1904; and 1906–1909; one of the Secretaries of the MacDonnell Boarding House, Allahabad; Offg. Additional Judicial Commissioner, Oudh, 1909; Vice-Chairman, U.P. Exhibition, 1910–11; acting Judicial Commissioner for 5 months; Judge, High Court, N.W.P.. 1914; owner of the largest private library in the Province; prominently connected with the establishment of the University School of Law and the Hindu University, Benares; nominated as an Additional Member, Imperial Legislative Council, 1915: resigned his seat in the U.P. Legislative Council, 1915. Address: Allahabad.

In 1906, he became the first Indian Vice Chancellor of Allahabad University. He was reappointed to that office in 1912 and 1916.

In 1916, he was named the founding Vice Chancellor of Banaras Hindu University (BHU). The Sir Sunderlal Hospital of the Institute of Medical Sciences on the BHU campus is named in his honor.

On 21 February 1917, Sunder Lal received a knighthood. He died in Allahabad on 13 February 1918 at age 60.
