= Basti Lok Sabha constituency =

Lok Sabha Constituency in Uttar Pradesh

Coordinates: 26.79°N 82.82°E

Basti
- Lok Sabha constituency
- Interactive Map Outlining Basti Lok Sabha constituency

Constituency details
- Country: India
- Region: North India
- State: Uttar Pradesh
- Assembly constituencies: Harraiya; Kaptanganj; Rudhauli; Basti Sadar; Mahadewa
- Established: 1951
- Reservation: None

Member of Parliament
- 18th Lok Sabha
- Incumbent Ram Prasad Chaudhary
- Party: Samajwadi Party
- Elected year: 2024

Basti Lok Sabha constituency is one of the 80 Lok Sabha (parliamentary) constituencies in Uttar Pradesh state in northern India.

== Assembly Segments ==
There are five assembly constituencies in Vidhan Sabha (legislative assembly) segments. These are:

| No | Name | District | Member | Party | 2024 Lead |
|---|---|---|---|---|---|
| 307 | Harraiya | Basti | Ajay Kumar Singh | BJP | BJP |
| 308 | Kaptanganj | Basti | Kavindra Chaudhary | SP | SP |
| 309 | Rudhauli | Basti | Rajendra Chaudhary | SP | SP |
| 310 | Basti Sadar | Basti | Mahendra Nath Yadav | SP | SP |
| 311 | Mahadewa (SC) | Basti | Doodhram | SBSP | SP |

== Members of Parliament ==
| Year | Member | Party |
|---|---|---|
| 1951 | Uday Shankar Dubey | Indian National Congress |
| 1957 | Ram Garib | Independent politician |
| 1957^ | Keshav Dev Malviya | Indian National Congress |
| 1962 | Keshav Dev Malviya | Indian National Congress |
| 1967 | Sheo Narain | Indian National Congress |
| 1971 | Anant Prasad Dhusia | Indian National Congress |
| 1977 | Sheo Narain | Janata Party |
| 1980 | Kalpnath Sonkar | Indian National Congress |
| 1984 | Ram Awadh Prasad | Indian National Congress |
| 1989 | Kalpnath Sonkar | Janata Dal |
| 1991 | Shyam Lal Kamal | Bharatiya Janata Party |
| 1996 | Sriram Chauhan | Bharatiya Janata Party |
| 1998 | Sriram Chauhan | Bharatiya Janata Party |
| 1999 | Sriram Chauhan | Bharatiya Janata Party |
| 2004 | Lal Mani Prasad | Bahujan Samaj Party |
| 2009 | Arvind Kumar Chaudhary | Bahujan Samaj Party |
| 2014 | Harish Dwivedi | Bharatiya Janata Party |
| 2019 | Harish Dwivedi | Bharatiya Janata Party |
| 2024 | Ram Prasad Chaudhary | Samajwadi Party |

^ by poll

== Election results ==
=== General Election 2024 ===
2024 Indian general elections: Basti
| Party | Candidate | Votes | % | ±% |
|---|---|---|---|---|
| SP | Ram Prasad Chaudhary | 527,005 | 48.67 | ▲48.67 |
| BJP | Harish Dwivedi | 4,26,011 | 39.34 | ▼5.34 |
| BSP | Lavkush Patel | 1,03,301 | 9.54 | ▼32.26 |
| NOTA | None of the Above | 7,761 | 0.72 | ▼0.26 |
| Majority | | 1,00,994 | 9.33 | ▲6.42 |
| Turnout | | 10,82,870 | 56.67 | ▼0.52 |
| SP gain from BJP | | Swing | | |

=== General Election 2019 ===
2019 Indian general elections: Basti
| Party | Candidate | Votes | % | ±% |
|---|---|---|---|---|
| BJP | Harish Dwivedi | 471,163 | 44.68 | +10.57 |
| BSP | Ram Prasad Chaudhary | 4,40,808 | 41.8 | +14.74 |
| INC | Raj Kishor Singh | 86,920 | 8.24 | |
| SBSP | Vinod Kumar Rajbhar | 11,971 | 1.14 | |
| HND | Rohit Kumar Pathak | 3,182 | 0.3 | |
| NOTA | NOTA | 10,298 | 0.98 | + 0.01 |
| Others | Remaining Candidates | 30,184 | 2.84 | −0.66 |
| Majority | | 30,354 | 2.88 | −0.32 |
| Turnout | | 10,55,201 | 57.19 | |
| BJP hold | | Swing | | |

=== General Election 2014 ===
2014 Indian general elections: Basti
| Party | Candidate | Votes | % | ±% |
|---|---|---|---|---|
| BJP | Harish Dwivedi | 3,57,680 | 34.11 | +18.96 |
| SP | Brij Kishor Singh "Dimpal" | 324,118 | 30.91 | +9.79 |
| BSP | Ram Prasad Chaudhary | 283,747 | 27.06 | −7.66 |
| INC | Ambika Singh | 27,673 | 2.64 | −9.67 |
| AAP | Anand Rajpal | 8,407 | 0.80 | +0.80 |
| NOTA | None of the Above | 10,168 | 0.97 | +0.97 |
| | Remainder 8 candidates | 36,741 | 3.50 | N/A |
| Majority | | 33,562 | 3.20 | |
| Turnout | | 10,48,539 | 58.66 | |
| BJP gain from BSP | | Swing | -4.46 | |

=== 15th Lok Sabha: 2009 General Election ===
2009 Indian general elections: Basti
| Party | Candidate | Votes | % | ±% |
|---|---|---|---|---|
| BSP | Arvind Kumar Chaudhary | 2,68,666 | 34.72 | |
| SP | Raj Kishor Singh | 1,63,456 | 21.12 | |
| BJP | Dr. Y. D. Singh | 1,17,259 | 15.15 | |
| INC | Basant Chaudhary | 95,235 | 12.31 | |
| PECP | Daya Shankar Patwa | 67,987 | 8.79 | |
| | Remainder 11 candidates | 36,741 | 3.50 | N/A |
| Majority | | 1,05,210 | 13.60 | |
| Turnout | | 7,73,779 | 49.26 | |
| BSP hold | | Swing | | |

== See also ==
- Basti district
- List of constituencies of the Lok Sabha
- Basti Khabar
