= Ankur Raj Tiwari =

Indian politician (born 1991)

Ankur raj Tiwari
- अंकुर Raj तिवारी

MLA in 18th Legislative Assembly of Uttar Pradesh
- Incumbent
- Assumed office March 2022
- Preceded by: Digvijay Narayan Chaubey
- Constituency: Khalilabad

Personal details
- Born: 15 September 1990 (age 36) Khalidabad, Uttar Pradesh, India
- Party: Bharatiya Janata Party
- Parent: Uday Raj Tiwari (father)
- Occupation: Politician

Ankur Raj Tiwari is an Indian politician and a member of the Uttar Pradesh Legislative Assembly representing Khalilabad (Assembly constituency) in Sant Kabir Nagar district of Uttar Pradesh.

== Early life and political career ==
Ankur Raj Tiwari was born in a Brahmin family on 23 September 1991 in Sant Kabir Nagar (then a part of Basti), Uttar Pradesh. His father is Uday Raj Tiwari.

In October 2021, Tiwari was granted membership of Bharatiya Janata Party by BJP Uttar Pradesh state president Swatantra Dev Singh, marking his entry into active politics. He was announced as the BJP candidate in the 2022 Uttar Pradesh Legislative Assembly election from Khalilabad constituency in Sant Kabir Nagar district. He won the polls, defeating Digvijay Narayan Chaubey of the Samajwadi Party by 12,622 votes.
