= Dayaram Chaudhary =

Indian politician

MLA, 17th Legislative Assembly
- Incumbent
- Assumed office March 2017
- Constituency: Basti Sadar, Basti district

Personal details
- Born: Basti, Uttar Pradesh, India
- Party: Bharatiya Janata Party
- Parent: Shri Ram
- Occupation: MLA
- Profession: Politician

Dayaram Chaudhary is an Indian politician and a member of 17th Legislative Assembly of Basti, Uttar Pradesh of India. He represents the Basti Sadar constituency of Uttar Pradesh and is a member of the Bharatiya Janata Party.

== Political career ==
Chaudhary has been a member of the 17th Legislative Assembly of Uttar Pradesh. Since 2017, he has represented the Basti Sadar constituency and is a member of the BJP. He is a face of Kurmi caste in Basti division.

== Posts held ==
#	From	To	Position	Comments
01	2017	2022	Member, 17th Legislative Assembly	

== See also ==
- Uttar Pradesh Legislative Assembly
