= Khalilabad, India =

Khalilabad
- Municipality
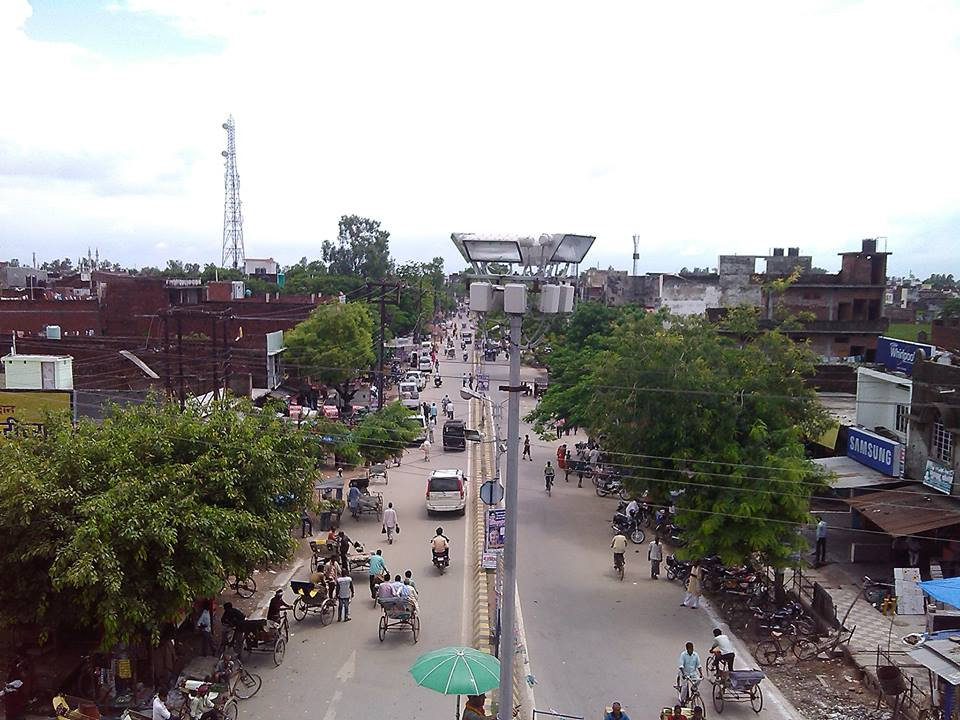

- Location in Uttar Pradesh, India
- Coordinates: 26.78°N 83.07°E
- Country: India
- State: Uttar Pradesh
- District: Sant Kabir Nagar
- Established: Jun 1580
- Founder: Qazi Khalil-ur-Rahman (Representative of Aurangzeb Mughal emperor in this area at that time)
- Named for: Qazi Khalil-ur-Rahman

Government
  - MP: Laxmikant Nishad(Pappu Nishad)
  - MLA: Ankur Raj Tiwari

Area
  - Total: 26 km^{2} (10 sq mi)
- Elevation: 69 m (226 ft)

Population (2015)
  - Total: 49,879
  - Density: 1,042/km^{2} (2,700/sq mi)
- Demonym: Khalilabadi

Languages
  - Official: Hindi, English, Urdu
  - Regional: Bhojpuri
- Time zone: UTC+5:30 (IST)
- PIN: 272175
- Vehicle registration: UP-58
- Website: https://sknagar.nic.in/

Khalilabad is a city and a municipal board in Sant Kabir Nagar district in the Indian state of Uttar Pradesh. It is the district headquarters of Sant Kabir Nagar district.

== Geography ==
Khalilabad lies on the Ayodhya-Gorakhpur road around 36 km west of Gorakhpur and 36 km east of Basti. Khalilabad lies at Lat. 26 47'N. and Long. 83 4' E. This is the center point of Gorakhpur and Basti. It is the headquarters of the new district Sant Kabir Nagar.

The town is small but has a history that can be traced back to the Mughal emperors. The place got its name from its founder, Qazi Khalil-ur-Rahman, who was appointed chakladar of Gorakhpur about 1860 AD.

At present this place is more famous for its fabric wholesalers, Readymade Garment Retailers, and much more, popularly known as Bardahia Bazar. The tehsil building, situated to the south of the road to Gorakhpur, is an imposing structure created after the first freedom struggle in 1857 in which the place was sacked.

== Climate ==
The climate of the district is more equable than the adjoining districts to the south. The year may be divided into four seasons. The winter season, from mid-November to February, is followed by the summer season lasting till about the middle of June. The period from mid-June to the end of September constitutes the southwest monsoon season. October to mid-November is the post-monsoon or transition period.

Rainfall: The average annual rainfall in the district is 1166 mm.

Temperature: During the winter seasons, the mean minimum temperature is about 9 degrees Celsius, and the mean maximum is 23 degrees Celsius, while during the summer seasons the minimum is about 25 degrees Celsius and the mean maximum is about 44 degrees Celsius.

Humidity: In the southwest monsoon and the post-monsoon seasons, the relative humidity is high, above 70 percent. Thereafter the humidity decreases and in the summer the air is very dry.

Cloudiness: During the monsoon season, and for brief spells of a day or two in association with passing disturbances in winter, heavily clouded or overcast skies prevail. During the rest of the year, the skies are mostly clear or lightly clouded.

Winds: Winds are in general very light with a slight increase in force in the late summer and monsoon seasons. The average annual wind blow in the district ranges from 2 to 7.1 km/hrs.

== River system and water resources ==
The Ami, the chief tributary of the Rapti, is a stream that commences at a short distance from Rapti in Rasulpur and issues from a large tract of paddy land.

The lakes of the district are numerous and several are of considerable size. They are most commonly formed by the changes in the river channels, while in other cases the natural depressions in which the surface of water collects, are generally due in some measure to fluvial action. The largest and the most celebrated lake in the district is the Bakhira or Badhanchh Tal, sometimes called the Moti Jhil, which lies on the eastern borders of the district between Bakhira and Mehdawal. This lake, though seldom more than two meters in depth, covers a very large area of about 12 km. long and 4 km. broad. The water in the lake is largely derived from the overflow from Rapti.

== Transport ==
=== Road ===
NH 27 and NH 28A pass through Khalilabad.(Ragadganj)

=== Railway ===
Railway Station Khalilabad is on the Gorakhpur-Lucknow line.

=== Airlines ===
The nearest airport is in Gorakhpur. It is approximately an hour-long drive from Khalilabad.

== Demographics ==
Khalilabad is a Nagar Palika Parishad city in the district of Sant Kabir Nagar, Uttar Pradesh. The Khalilabad city is divided into 25 wards for which elections are held every 5 years. The Khalilabad Nagar Palika Parishad has a population of 47,847 of which 25,154 are males while 22,693 are females as per a report released by Census India 2011.

The population of children aged 0-6 is 6274, which is 13.11% of the total population of Khalilabad (NPP). In Khalilabad Nagar Palika Parishad, the female sex ratio is 902, compared to the state average of 912. Moreover, the child sex ratio in Khalilabad is around 900 compared to the Uttar Pradesh state average of 902. The literacy rate of Khalilabad City is 82.06%, which is higher than the state average of 67.68%. In Khalilabad, male literacy is around 88.68% while the female literacy rate is 74.72%.

Khalilabad Nagar Palika Parishad has total administration of over 7,291 houses to which it supplies basic amenities like water and sewerage. It is also authorized to build roads within Nagar Palika Parishad limits and impose taxes on properties coming under its jurisdiction.

Religions in Khalilabad
Religion	Percent
Hindus	68.79%
Muslims	30.08%
Christianity	0.26%
Sikhism	0.39%
Jainism	0.06%
Buddhism	0.03%
Others	0.39%

== Villages ==
- Pach Pokhari
