= Peace Party (India) =

- Abbreviation: PECP
- President: Mohamed Ayub
- Secretary: Farooq Ahmad
- Founded: February 2008
- Headquarters: Johra Complex, Barhalganj, Gorakhpur - 273402 (U.P.)
- Ideology: Muslim minority interests
- ECI status: State Party
- Seats in Uttar Pradesh: 0 / 403

Election symbol

Party flag
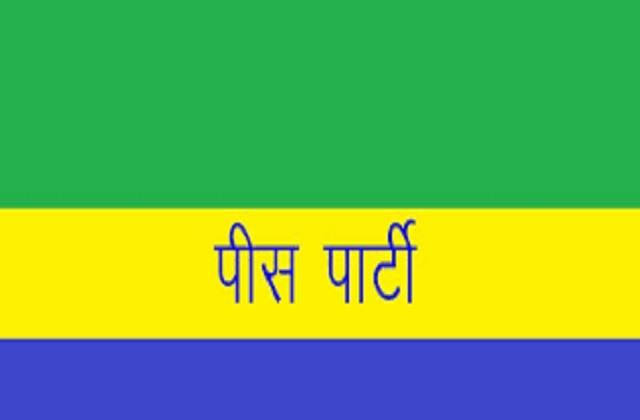

The Peace Party (PECP) is a political party in India. It became the sixth largest political party of India's most populous state, Uttar Pradesh, following the state legislative assembly elections of 2012. It won three seats in those elections. But failed to retain any of them in the 2017 Elections. Ahead of 2022 Uttar Pradesh Legislative Assembly election, Peace Party formed an alliance with Rashtriya Ulama Council.

The party was founded in February 2008 by Mohamed Ayub, who is a surgeon by profession and philanthropist.

It claims to fight for the rights of only Muslims. It has organized many protest against Citizenship Amendment Act protests in Uttar Pradesh. Many leaders of PECP are facing NSA charges over incitement to communal riots in name of protest and posting communal ad which can lead to communal tensions.

== 2012 UP Assembly Elections ==
The PECP contested around 208 Assembly seats in the 2012 Uttar Pradesh Legislative Assembly election, where it obtained 2.35 per cent of the vote and so ranked fifth by percentage of votes gained. Four candidates were successful in being elected: Aneesurrehman, Kanth; Mohamed Ayub- Khalilabad Kamal Yusuf Mallik - Domariyaganj Akhilesh kumar singh- Raebareli The Party is officially recognized as a State Party

== 2017 UP Assembly Elections ==
The Party did not regain any of its seat which it won in last elections.

== 2022 UP Assembly Elections ==
The Peace Party and the Rashtriya Ulama Council (RUC) decided to contest the 2022 Uttar Pradesh Assembly elections together under the banner of the United Democratic Alliance.

During the announcement of the decision at a press conference, Peace Party chief Dr Ayub said that even after 74 years of Independence, Muslims had continued to be the “slaves” of secular parties.

== Strategy ==
The strategy of the PECP is to bring together other like-minded parties and groups, such as the, Bhartiya Samaj Party, Janvadi Party and National Lok Hit Party into one. It plants to expand its activities to other regions of India, including Bihar, Jharkhand, Uttrakhand, Delhi, Madhya Pradesh, Rajasthan, Maharashtra, Odisha, and Chhattisgarh. In 2015, the Delhi state unit of the party merged with the AAP, shortly before the 2015 Delhi polls. They have some presence in Muslim dominated areas of Eastern Uttar Pradesh.

== Election symbol ==
The party has been officially assigned the "glass of water" for its symbol for contesting elections.

== Leadership ==
- Dr. Abdul Rasheed Ansari (National Vice President)
- Arvind Nishad (President Of Uttar Pradesh )
- Er Mohammad irfan
- Maulana Kalimullah Faizi (National General Secretary And President of Ulma Group)
- Afroz Badal Jharkhand Co-Ordinator and
- National General Secretary
- Riyaz khan National Secretary, Domariaganj
- Mohd Akmal State Official Lucknow
- Azlal Khan, General Secretary, Maharashtra
- Dr. Jahangir Alvi, General Secretary of Uttar Pradesh
- Dr. Shamim Aabdi
- Molana Safqat Taqi (General Secretary, Maharashtra Prabhari and spokesperson)
- Abdur Rahman Chaudhary; (president Maharashtra state)
- Maulana Gulzar Ahmad (National Spokesperson)
- Sayyed Mohammad Ahmad (Communication Cell of Siddharth Nagar)
- Masroor Ahmad Khan, National Secretary, Balrampur
- Mohammad Mohsin Shaikh (President Mumbai)
- Faizan Ahmed Shaikh (Vice-president Mumbai)
- Hafiz Gulam Sarwar (President Delhi)
- Jahangir Naimi (State Vice President)
- Mohammad Shafeeq Khan (State General Secretary)
- Ansar Ahmd Khan (District Vice President Siddharth Nagar)

== Uttar Pradesh Legislative Assembly Election ==
| Year | Seats Contested | Seats Won | Vote Share | Seat change |
|---|---|---|---|---|
| 2012 | 208 | 4 | 2.35% | +4 |
| 2017 | 150 | 0 | 0.35% | -4 |

== See also ==
- List of Islamic political parties
- List of political parties in India
