= Sant Kabir Nagar district =

Coordinates: 26°46′48″N 83°03′36″E

- District of Uttar Pradesh
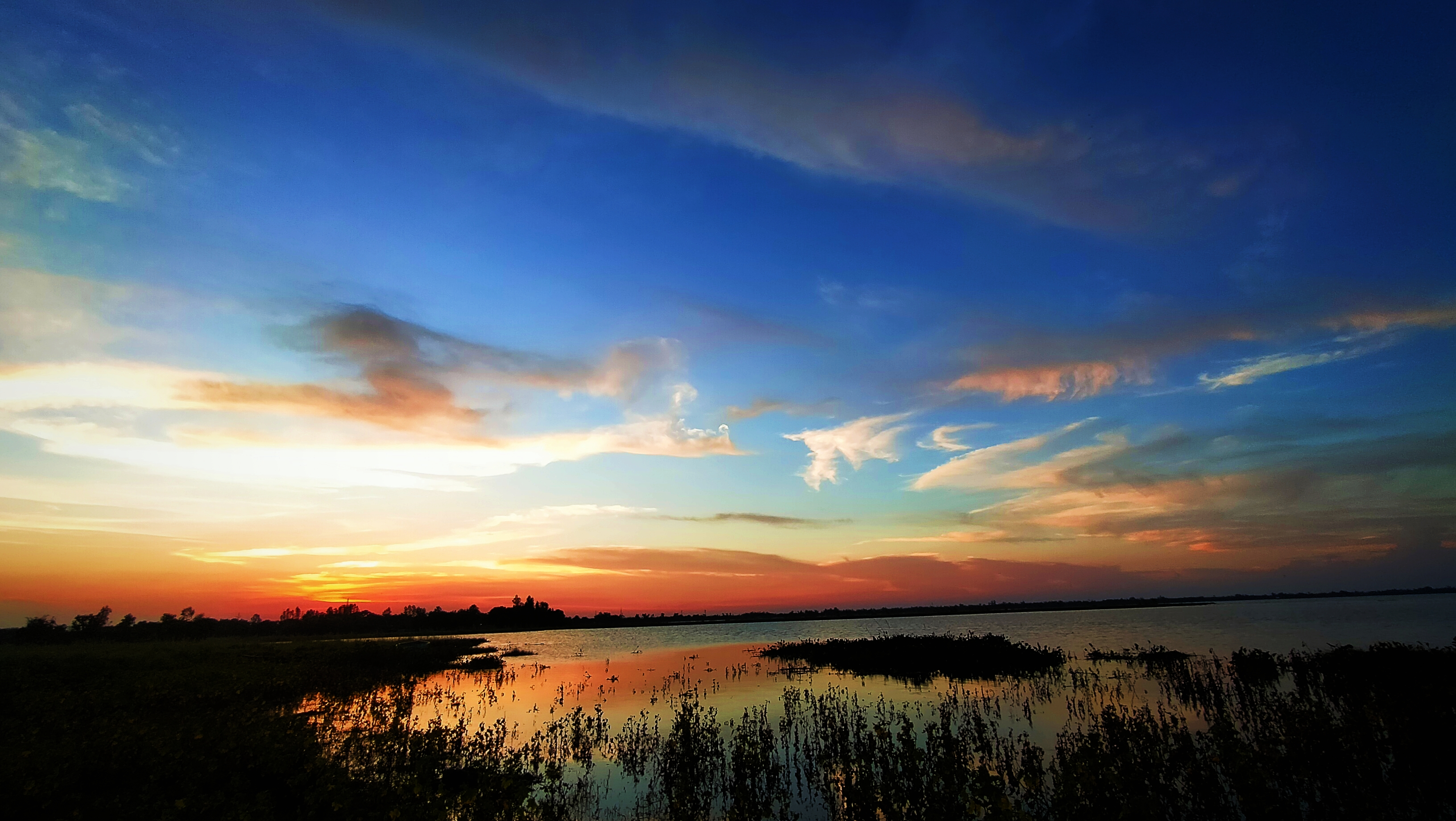
- Bakhira Bird Sanctuary

- Location of Sant Kabir Nagar district in Uttar Pradesh
- Country: India
- State: Uttar Pradesh
- Division: Basti
- Headquarters: Khalilabad
- Tehsils: Khalilabad, Mehdawal, Ghanghata

Government
  - Lok Sabha constituencies: Sant Kabir Nagar,(Khalilabad, Dhanghata, Alapur, Khajni, Mehdawal)

Area
  - Total: 1,646 km^{2} (636 sq mi)

Population (2011)
  - Total: 1,715,183
  - Density: 1,042/km^{2} (2,699/sq mi)

Language
  - Official: Hindi
  - Additional official: Urdu
  - Regional: Bhojpuri

Demographics
  - Literacy: 66.72 per cent
  - Sex ratio: 969
- Time zone: UTC+05:30 (IST)
- Vehicle registration: UP-58
- Major highways: National Highway 28 (India)
- Website: sknagar.nic.in

Sant Kabir Nagar district is one of the 75 districts of Uttar Pradesh state in northern India. Khalilabad is the district headquarters. Sant Kabir Nagar district is a part of Basti division. The total area of Sant Kabir Nagar district is 1,646 km^{2} (636 sq mi).

== Economy ==
In 2007 the Ministry of Panchayati Raj named Sant Kabir Nagar one of the country's 250 most backward districts (out of a total of 640). It is one of the 34 districts in Uttar Pradesh currently receiving funds from the Backward Regions Grant Fund Programme (BRGF).

== Demographics ==
Historical population
Year	Pop.	±% p.a.
1901	486,935	—
1911	482,786	−0.09%
1921	507,791	+0.51%
1931	548,093	+0.77%
1941	576,478	+0.51%
1951	629,746	+0.89%
1961	652,787	+0.36%
1971	752,737	+1.43%
1981	911,052	+1.93%
1991	1,152,116	+2.38%
2001	1,420,226	+2.11%
2011	1,715,183	+1.90%

Religions in Sant Kabir Nagar district (2011)
Religion	Percent
Hinduism	75.83%
Islam	23.58%
Other or not stated	0.59%

According to the 2011 census, Sant Kabir Nagar district has a population of 1,715,183, roughly equal to the nation of The Gambia or the US state of Nebraska, making it the 283rd most populous district in India (out of a total of 640). The district has a population density of 1,041 inhabitants per square kilometre (2,700/sq mi). Its population growth rate over the decade 2001-2011 was 20.71%. Sant Kabir Nagar has a sex ratio of 969 females for every 1000 males and a literacy rate of 69.01%. 7.49% of the population lives in urban areas. Scheduled Castes and Scheduled Tribes make up 21.52% and 0.09% of the population respectively.

=== Language ===
Languages in Sant Kabir Nagar district (2011)
1. Bhojpuri (53.7%)
2. Hindi (36.4%)
3. Urdu (9.49%)
4. Others (0.43%)

At the time of the 2011 Census of India, 53.67% of the population in the district spoke Bhojpuri, 36.42% Hindi and 9.49% Urdu as their first language.

Bhojpuri is the native language of the district. The Bhojpuri variant of Kaithi is the indigenous script of Bhojpuri language.

== Notable residents ==
- Sant Kabir Das, poet
- Bhalchandra Yadava, politician
- Ram Prasad Chaudhary, politician
- Kavindra Chaudhary, politician
- Ankur Raj Tiwari, politician
- Sucheta Kripalani, first woman Chief Minister of India, MLA from Mehndawal(1962–1967)
- Akhilesh Pati Tripathi, politician in Delhi
- Nagendra Nath Tripathi, politician
