= Nishad (surname) =

Notable people bearing the name Nishad include:

- K. K. Nishad (born 1978), Indian playback singer
- Mahendra Prasad Nishad (born 1967), Indian politician
- Vishambhar Prasad Nishad (born 1962), Indian politician
- Jai Narain Prasad Nishad (1930–2018), Indian politician
- Kajal Nishad (born 1982), Indian actress
- Jamuna Nishad (1953–2010), Indian politician
- Ajay Nishad (born 1966), Indian politician
- Mukesh Sahani (born 1981), Indian Politician
- Sanjay Nishad, cabinet minister in Government of Uttar Pradesh.
- Praveen Kumar Nishad, member of Indian Parliament.

== See also ==
- Nishad, an Indian caste
