= Laxmikant (disambiguation) =

Laxmikant or Lakshmikant is an Indian given name:

- Laxmikant alias Pappu Nishad, Indian politician
- Laxmikant–Pyarelal, Indian musical duo
- Laxmikant Bajpai, Indian politician
- Laxmikant Berde, Marathi film actor
- Laxmikant Kale, professor of computer science at the University of Illinois at Urbana-Champaign
- Laxmikant Kattimani, Indian soccer goalkeeper.
- Laxmikant Parsekar, former Chief Minister of Goa
- Laxmikant Sharma, Indian politician
- Laxmikant Shetgaonkar, Indian film director
- Vishnu, principal deity of Hinduism

== See also ==
- Lakshmikantam (disambiguation)
