= Sanjay Nishad =

Indian politician (born 1965)

Minister of Fisheries Government of Uttar Pradesh
- Incumbent
- Assumed office 25 March 2022
- Chief Minister: Yogi Adityanath

Member of Uttar Pradesh Legislative Council
- Incumbent
- Assumed office 1 October 2021
- Constituency: Nominated By Governor

President-Founder of NISHAD Party
- Incumbent
- Assumed office 7 June 2013
- Preceded by: position established

Personal details
- Born: 7 June 1965 (age 61) Chaumukha, Uttar Pradesh, India
- Party: NISHAD Party
- Other political affiliations: National Democratic Alliance
- Children: 3 sons:Praveen Kumar Nishad, Amit Nishad, Sarvan Kumar Nishad.

Sanjay Nishad (born 7 June 1965) is an Indian politician from Uttar Pradesh serving as a cabinet minister in the Second Yogi Adityanath ministry. He has been a member of Uttar Pradesh Legislative Council since 2021. As a member of the Nishad caste, he founded the NISHAD Party in 2016.

== Early life and education ==
Sanjay Nishad was born to a Nishad family on 7 June 1965 in Chaumukha, Gorakhpur. He completed a course in electrohomeopathy. He initiated a struggle to get this course recognised as a medical discipline, and founded the Purvanchal Medical Electro Homeopathy Association in 2002 and became its president. Before forming the NISHAD Party, he ran a clinic at Geeta Vatika Road, Gorakhpur for a decade.

== Political career ==
In 2021, Nishad won the election for the Legislative Council and became a member of Uttar Pradesh Legislative Council. After the victory of NDA in 2022 UP Elections, he became a Cabinet Minister in the Second Yogi Adityanath ministry, and took the oath on 25 March 2022.

== Controversy ==
On 29 April 2022, Sanjay Nishad gave a controversial statement to the media where he claimed that a person who does not love Hindi is "a foreigner or linked to foreign powers" and that "Hindustan is not a place for those who don’t speak Hindi. They should leave this country and go somewhere else.”

In December 2025, Nishad sparked controversy while defending Bihar Chief Minister Nitish Kumar, who faced severe backlash after a video surfaced showing him forcefully physically removing the hijab of a Muslim woman on stage. Defending the act, Nishad remarked, "Hijab hi to nikala hai, kahi or chhu diya hota to kiya hota" (He only removed the hijab; what if he had touched somewhere else?), a statement that was widely condemned as misogynistic and insensitive.

== Personal life ==
He is married to Malti Nishad.The couple has three sons. His eldest son is Praveen Kumar Nishad, who was elected as Member of Parliament from Gorakhpur in the 2018 by-election and from Sant Kabir Nagar from 2019 to 2024. His second son, Sarvan Kumar Nishad, is a Bharatiya Janata Party MLA from Chauri-Chaura.
