= Jhabel =

Pakistani tribe

The Jhabel are a Sindhi-speaking tribe, found in the province of Punjab, Pakistan.

== History and origin ==
The Jhabel are essentially a tribe of fishermen and boatmen, found in the southern districts of Punjab, mainly along the banks of the Indus and Sutlej rivers. In additions, they are also involved in collecting water-lilies, which prized as a herb. They say they are descended from Bhatti Rajputs, who fell into poverty, and took to fishing. According to other traditions, their ancestor is said to have come originally from Sindh, and they belonged to the Mallaah tribe. Other tribes like Kutana, Kihal and Mor are thought to have same origin. Many members of the tribe have taken agriculture, particularly those found along the banks of the Sutlej. The Jhabel are Sunni Muslims, following both the Barelvi and Deobandi sub-sects. More than any other community, they have been affected by the damming of the Punjab rivers, which has led to the abandonment of their traditional occupation as boatmen. Many are landless, working as tenant farmers for the large land owners that dominate southern Punjab.

== See also ==
- Mallaah
- Mohana
