= Sarvan Kumar Nishad =

Member of the Uttar Pradesh Legislative Assembly

Member of Uttar Pradesh Legislative Assembly
- Incumbent
- Assumed office March 2022
- Preceded by: Sangeeta Yadav
- Constituency: Chauri-Chaura

Personal details
- Born: 1 February 1990 (age 36) Gorakhpur, Uttar Pradesh
- Party: Bharatiya Janata Party
- Relations: Praveen Kumar Nishad (brother)
- Parent: Sanjay Kumar Nishad (father)
- Education: Bachelor of Technology
- Alma mater: Gautam Buddha Technical University
- Occupation: Engineer
- Profession: Politician

Sarvan Kumar Nishad is an Indian politician, engineer, and a member of the 18th Uttar Pradesh Assembly from the Chauri-Chaura Assembly constituency of Gorakhpur district. He is a member of the Bharatiya Janata Party.

== Early life ==
Sarvan Kumar Nishad was born on 1 February 1990 in Gorakhpur, Uttar Pradesh, to a Hindu family of Sanjay Kumar Nishad.

== Education ==
Sarvan Kumar Nishad completed his education with a Bachelor of Technology in civil engineering at Gautam Buddha Technical University, Lucknow, in 2012.

== Posts held ==
#	From	To	Position	Comments
01	2022	Incumbent	Member, 18th Uttar Pradesh Assembly	

== See also ==
- 18th Uttar Pradesh Assembly
- Uttar Pradesh Legislative Assembly
- Chauri-Chaura Assembly constituency
