= Jai Prakash Nishad (Gorakhpur) =

Indian politician

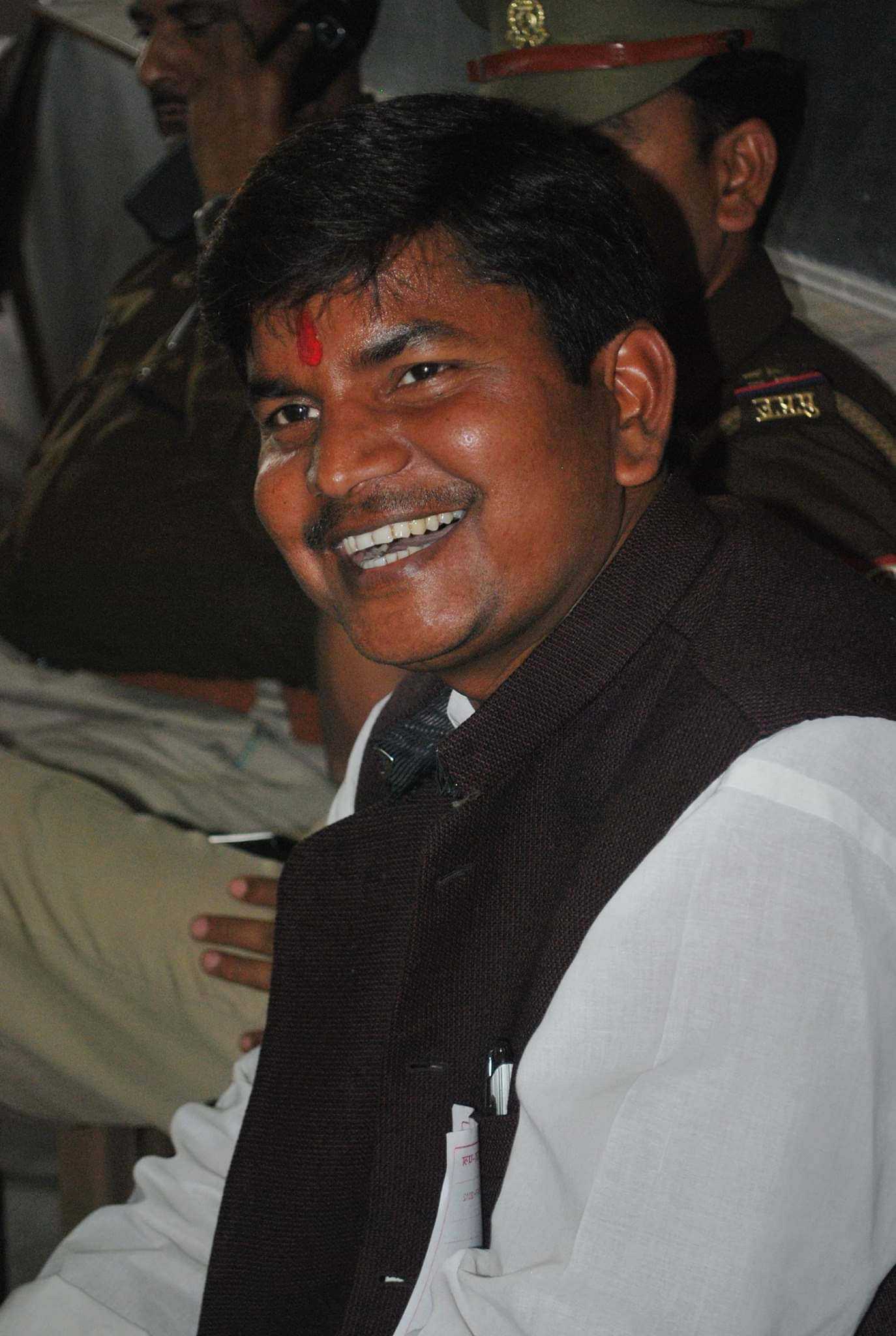

Member of Parliament Rajya Sabha
- In office 2020–2022
- Preceded by: Beni Prasad Verma
- Constituency: Uttar Pradesh

Member of Legislative Assembly Uttar Pradesh
- In office 2012–2017
- Succeeded by: Sangeeta Yadav
- Constituency: Chauri-Chaura

Personal details
- Born: 10 June 1972 (age 54)
- Party: Bharatiya Janata Party (2018 onwards)
- Other political affiliations: Bahujan Samaj Party (Until 2018)
- Spouse: Manorama (m. 1999)
- Education: Deen Dayal Upadhyay Gorakhpur University
- Profession: Politician

Jai Prakash Nishad is an Indian politician. He is a Member of Parliament, representing Uttar Pradesh in the Rajya Sabha the upper house of India's Parliament representing the Bharatiya Janata Party. He was a Minister of State in Uttar Pradesh, from 2008-2009.

== Personal life ==
Nishad is a graduate. He completed his studies from D.P.G College Deoria and Deen Dayal Upadhyay Gorakhpur University in 1998.
