= Vipul Dubey =

Member of Uttar Pradesh Legislative Assembly

Member of the Uttar Pradesh Legislative Assembly
- Incumbent
- Assumed office March 2022
- Preceded by: Vijay Mishra
- Constituency: Gyanpur

Personal details
- Born: 27 January 1982 (age 44) Milky, India
- Party: NISHAD Party
- Spouse: Sangita Devi
- Children: 3
- Parent: Ram Sagar Dubey (father)
- Education: Master of Arts
- Alma mater: Kashi Naresh Government Post Graduate College
- Occupation: Politician

Vipul Dubey (born 27 January 1982) is an Indian politician, farmer, and a member of the 18th Uttar Pradesh Assembly from the Gyanpur Assembly constituency. He is a member of the NISHAD Party.

== Early life ==
Vipul Dubey was born on 27 January 1982 in Milky to a Hindu Brahmin family of Ram Sagar Dubey. He married Sangita Devi, and they have three children.

== Education ==
Vipul Dubey completed his education with a Master of Arts from Kashi Naresh Government Post Graduate College, Gyanpur.

== Posts held ==
#	From	To	Position	Comments
01	2022	Incumbent	Member, 18th Uttar Pradesh Assembly	
