= Anil Kumar Tripathi =

Indian politician

- अनिल कुमार त्रिपाठी

MLA in 18th Legislative Assembly of Uttar Pradesh
- Incumbent
- Assumed office March 2022
- Preceded by: Rakesh Singh Baghel
- Constituency: Menhdawal

Personal details
- Born: 12 June 1965 (age 60) Menhdawal, Uttar Pradesh, India
- Party: NISHAD Party
- Spouse: Mrs. Asha Tripathi
- Education: Diploma in Civil Engineering
- Occupation: Politician
- Website: www.aniltripathi.in

Anil Kumar Tripathi is an Indian politician and a member of the Uttar Pradesh Legislative Assembly representing the Menhdawal constituency in Sant Kabir Nagar district of Uttar Pradesh.

== Early life and political career ==
Anil Kumar Tripathi was born on 12 June 1965 in Karma Kalan village of Sant Kabir Nagar (then a part of Basti), Uttar Pradesh. He has been active in politics for the last 18 years contesting the Uttar Pradesh Legislative Assembly polls from the Menhdawal legislative assembly constituency. He contested the 2007 polls independently, earning the fourth position. In 2012, he was the Menhdawal constituency candidate of the Peace Party of India, placing himself in the second position. He retained his second position in the 2017 Uttar Pradesh Legislative Assembly election on Bahujan Samaj Party's ticket. With a history of three defeats from the same constituency, he won in his fourth attempt in 2022.
