= Menhdawal Assembly constituency =

Constituency of the Uttar Pradesh legislative assembly in India

Coordinates: 26.98°N 83.11°E

Menhdawal
- Constituency No. 312 for the Uttar Pradesh Legislative Assembly

Constituency details
- Country: India
- Region: North India
- State: Uttar Pradesh
- District: Sant Kabir Nagar
- Total electors: 4,57,864
- Reservation: None

Member of Legislative Assembly
- 18th Uttar Pradesh Legislative Assembly
- Incumbent Anil Kumar Tripathi
- Party: NISHAD
- Alliance: NDA
- Elected year: 2022

Menhdawal is a constituency of the Uttar Pradesh Legislative Assembly covering the city of Menhdawal in the Sant Kabir Nagar district of Uttar Pradesh in India.

Menhdawal is one of five assembly constituencies in the Sant Kabir Nagar Lok Sabha constituency. Since 2008, this assembly constituency is numbered 312 amongst 403 constituencies.

== Members of Legislative Assembly ==
Year	Member	Party
1962	Sucheta Kripalani	Indian National Congress
1967	Chandra Sekhar Singh	Bharatiya Jana Sangh
1969	Lalsa Prasad	Indian National Congress
1974	Chandra Sekhar Singh	Bharatiya Jana Sangh
1977	Chandra Sekhar Singh	Janata Party
1980	Mohd. Nabi Khan	Indian National Congress (U)
1985	Afsar-U-Ahmad	Indian National Congress
1989	Chandra Sekhar Singh	Bharatiya Janata Party
1991	Chandra Sekhar Singh	Bharatiya Janata Party
1993	Chandra Sekhar Singh	Bharatiya Janata Party
1996	Abdul Kalam	Samajwadi Party
2002	Abdul Kalam	Samajwadi Party
2007	Abdul Kalam	Samajwadi Party
2012	Laxmikant Nishad	Samajwadi Party
2017	Rakesh Singh Baghel	Bharatiya Janata Party
2022	Anil Kumar Tripathi	NISHAD Party

== Election results ==
=== 2027 ===
2027 Uttar Pradesh Legislative Assembly election: Mahadewal
Party	Candidate	Votes	%	±%
INDIA				
NDA				
BSP				
NOTA	None of the above			
Majority				
Turnout				
gain from		Swing		

=== 2022 ===
Currently this seat belongs to NISHAD Party candidate Anil Kumar Tripathi who won in last Assembly election of 2022 Uttar Pradesh Legislative Elections defeating Samajwadi Party candidate Jai Chand alias Jairam Pandey by a margin of 5,223 votes.

2022 Uttar Pradesh Legislative Assembly election: Menhdawal
Party	Candidate	Votes	%	±%
NISHAD	Anil Kumar Tripathi	90,193	37.23	
SP	Jairam Pandey	84,970	35.08	▲18.37
BSP	Muhammad Tabish Khan	50,554	20.87	▲1.27
VIP	Surendra Mohan	2,440	1.01	
INC	Rafica Khatoon	2,370	0.98	
NOTA	None of the above	2,058	0.85	▼0.35
Majority		5,223	2.15	▼16.94
Turnout		242,230	52.9	▲1.63
NISHAD gain from BJP		Swing	-1.92	

=== 2017 ===
2017 General Elections: Menhdawal
Party	Candidate	Votes	%	±%
BJP	Rakesh Singh Baghel	86,976	38.69	
BSP	Anil Kumar Tripathi	44,062	19.6	
SP	Jairam Pandey	37,557	16.71	
PECP	Er. Mohammad Irfan	25,499	11.34	
AIMIM	Mohd Tabish Khan	19,040	8.47	
RLD	Mohd Akram Hussain	3,445	1.53	
NOTA	None of the above	2,663	1.2	
Majority		42,914	19.09	
Turnout		224,820	51.27	
BJP gain from SP		Swing	+8.96	

=== 2012 ===
2012 General Elections: Menhdawal
Party	Candidate	Votes	%	±%
SP	Laxmikant	56,107	27.04	
PECP	Anil Kumar Tripathi	40,030	19.29	
BSP	Mohd Tayyab	33,183	15.99	
BJP	Rakesh Singh Baghel	30,525	14.71	
INC	Madan Narayan Singh	20,966	10.10	
JD(U)	Chandra Sekhar Pandey	10,897	5.25	
IND	Rajendra Kumar	2,773	1.34	
Majority		16,077	7.75	
Turnout		2,07,521	51.56	
SP hold		Swing		
