= Vijay Mishra (gangster) =

Indian politician (born 1957)

Vijay Kumar Mishra (born 7 September 1957) is an Indian gangster and a politician who has represented Gyanpur constituency on four terms as a member of Legislative Assembly of Uttar Pradesh.

== Politics ==
Mishra had been a member of the Samajwadi Party (SP), on whose symbol he successfully contested in the 2002, 2007 and 2012 assembly elections for Gyanpur constituency. In the 2017 state assembly elections, he won from the aforesaid seat on Nishad Party ticket. In March 2018, he was expelled from that party, despite being its only Member of the Legislative Assembly (MLA), when he supported a candidate of the Bharatiya Janata Party (BJP) in elections to the Rajya Sabha. The party allied with the Bahujan Samaj Party (BSP) and had ordered him to support the BSP candidate, Bhim Rao Ambedkar. In the 2022 Assembly Election, Vijay Mishra contested from Pragatisheel Manav Samaj Party but he lost this election badly, he remained in third position.

== Criminal History ==
As of November 2023, Mishra has 83 criminal cases to his record which includes nine cases of murder, fifteen cases of attempt to murder, two cases of rape, forgery, loot, kidnapping, extortion, property grabbing, etc. Described in 2007 by the Hindustan Times as a "mafia", he had at that time over 30 pending criminal cases lodged against him. He contested the 2012 election while in jail in relation to an alleged involvement in the 2010 bomb attack on Nand Gopal Gupta (also known as Nand Gopal Nandi), who was minister of state at that time (2010). Denying the charges as being politically motivated, he was released on bail later in the year, by which time 62 criminal cases were recorded against him. His family had anticipated his release would occur if the SP were returned to government.

The SP said it expelled Mishra in 2017 for "anti-party activities" when he had decided to contest the 2017 elections as an independent candidate due to the SP not adopting him. Other members of his family were expelled at the same time, including his wife, Ramlali Mishra, who was a member of the Uttar Pradesh Legislative Council. Mishra says that he resigned, together with many of his supporters.

Mishra and his daughter, Seema, who was then contesting a Lok Sabha seat in the 2014 Indian general election, were both provided with armed protection officers for a period up to April 2014, when the courts ordered that this measure, financed by the Uttar Pradesh government, was illegal. It ruled that such protection could not be given to people with a criminal history.

Mishra was born on 7 September 1957 in Khaptiha (Allahabad). He has one son and five daughters.

== Gang rape ==
In 2020, Vijay Mishra was accused of raping a singer from Varanasi in 2014. The singer has accused Vijay Mishra and his son of raping her along with one other person. He is also accused of harassment and physical molestation. As per the victim, Vijay Mishra and his relatives including his son had raped her in 2014 and she has been pressured as well as threatened for life to withdraw the case against them. Given the power and influence as muscleman and politician, the victim has accused that there is no progress in her case and threatened to commit suicide. However, in November 2023, a special court Bhadohi convicted him in the case and ordered 15 years of imprisonment and imposed one lakh rupees fine.
