= Lakshmikantam =

Lakshmikantam or Laxmikantam is an Indian given name:

- Balijepalli Lakshmikantam, actor, poet, screenwriter, dramatist
- Pingali Lakshmikantam, an Indian poet and writer

== See also ==
- Laxmikant, alternative spelling
- Vishnu, known by the epithet Lakshmikant, the beloved (kant) of Lakshmi
- Laxmikant–Pyarelal, Indian composer duo
