= Sant Kabir Nagar Lok Sabha constituency =

Constituency of the Indian parliament in Uttar Pradesh

Coordinates: 26.73°N 83.02°E

Sant Kabir Nagar UP-62
- Lok Sabha constituency
- Interactive Map Outlining Sant Kabir Nagar Lok Sabha constituency

Constituency details
- Country: India
- Region: North India
- State: Uttar Pradesh
- Assembly constituencies: Alapur; Menhdawal; Khalilabad; Dhanghata; Khajani
- Established: 2009–present
- Reservation: None

Member of Parliament
- 18th Lok Sabha
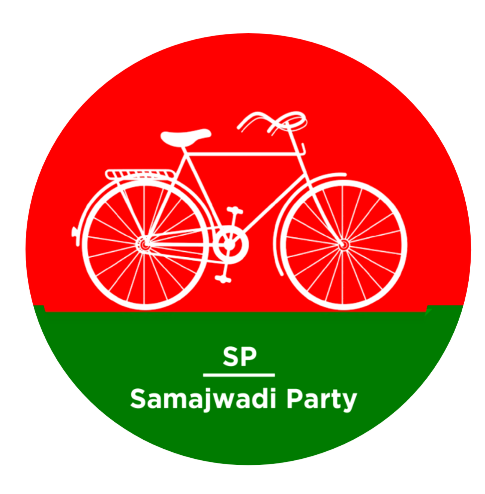
- Incumbent Pappu Nishad alias Laxmikant
- Party: SP
- Alliance: I.N.D.I.A.
- Elected year: 2024
- Preceded by: Praveen Kumar Nishad; BJP

Sant Kabir Nagar Lok Sabha constituency is one of the 80 Lok Sabha (parliamentary) constituencies in Uttar Pradesh state in northern India. This Sant Kabir Nagar constituency came into existence in 2009 as a part of the implementation of delimitation of parliamentary constituencies based on the recommendations of the Delimitation Commission of India constituted in 2002.

== Vidhan Sabha Segments ==
Presently, Sant Kabir Nagar Lok Sabha constituency comprises five Vidhan Sabha (legislative assembly) segments. These are:

| No | Name | District | Member | Party | 2024 Lead |
|---|---|---|---|---|---|
| 279 | Alapur (SC) | Ambedkar Nagar | Tribhuwan Dutt | SP | SP |
| 312 | Menhdawal | Sant Kabir Nagar | Anil Kumar Tripathi | NISHAD | SP |
| 313 | Khalilabad | Sant Kabir Nagar | Ankur Tiwari | BJP | SP |
| 314 | Dhanghata (SC) | Sant Kabir Nagar | Ganesh Chandra | BJP | SP |
| 325 | Khajani (SC) | Gorakhpur | Sriram Chauhan | BJP | BJP |

Mehdawal and Khalilabad Vidhan Sabha segments were earlier part of the erstwhile Khalilabad Lok Sabha constituency.

== Members of Lok Sabha ==
| Year | Member | Party |
|---|---|---|
Till 2008 : Constituency did not exist
| 2009 | Bhishma Shankar Tiwari | Bahujan Samaj Party |
| 2014 | Sharad Tripathi | Bharatiya Janata Party |
| 2019 | Praveen Kumar Nishad | Bharatiya Janata Party |
| 2024 | Laxmikant Nishad | Samajwadi Party |

== Election results ==
=== 2024 ===
2024 Indian general elections Sant Kabir Nagar
| Party | Candidate | Votes | % | ±% |
|---|---|---|---|---|
| SP | Laxmikant (Pappu Nishad) | 498,695 | 45.70 | ▲45.70 |
| BJP | Praveen Kumar Nishad | 4,06,525 | 37.25 | ▼6.72 |
| BSP | Nadeem Ashraf | 1,50,812 | 13.82 | ▼26.79 |
| NOTA | None of the above | 9,227 | 0.85 | ▼0.34 |
| Majority | | 92,170 | 8.45 | ▲5.09 |
| Turnout | | 10,91,202 | 52.67 | ▼1.53 |
| SP gain from BJP | | Swing | | |

=== 2019 ===
2019 Indian general elections: Sant Kabir Nagar
| Party | Candidate | Votes | % | ±% |
|---|---|---|---|---|
| BJP | Praveen Kumar Nishad | 467,543 | 43.97 | +9.50 |
| BSP | Bhishma Shankar Tiwari | 4,31,794 | 40.61 | |
| INC | Bhal Chandra Yadav | 1,28,506 | 12.08 | |
| NOTA | None of the Above | 12,631 | 1.19 | |
| Majority | | 35,749 | 3.36 | |
| Turnout | | 10,63,925 | 54.20 | |
| BJP hold | | Swing | | |

=== 2014 ===
2014 Indian general elections: Sant Kabir Nagar
| Party | Candidate | Votes | % | ±% |
|---|---|---|---|---|
| BJP | Sharad Tripathi | 3,48,892 | 34.47 | |
| BSP | Bhism Shankar (Kushal Tiwari) | 2,50,914 | 24.79 | |
| SP | Bhal Chandra Yadav | 2,40,169 | 23.73 | |
| PECP | Rajaram | 69,193 | 6.84 | |
| INC | Rohit Kumar Pandey | 22,029 | 2.18 | |
| NOTA | None of the Above | 4,747 | 0.47 | |
| Majority | | 97,978 | 9.68 | |
| Turnout | | 10,12,133 | 53.15 | |
| BJP gain from BSP | | Swing | | |

== See also ==
- Khalilabad Lok Sabha constituency
- Sant Kabir Nagar district
- List of constituencies of the Lok Sabha
