= Sangeeta Yadav =

Indian politician

Member of Parliament, Rajya Sabha
- Incumbent
- Assumed office 2022
- Preceded by: Syed Zafar Islam
- Constituency: Uttar Pradesh

MLA in 17th Legislative Assembly of Uttar Pradesh
- In office 2017–2022
- Preceded by: Jai Prakash Nishad
- Succeeded by: Sarvan Kumar Nishad
- Constituency: Chauri-Chaura (Assembly constituency)

Personal details
- Born: 20 July 1981 (age 45) Borivali, Mumbai, Maharashtra
- Party: Bharatiya Janata Party
- Spouse: Ajay Kumar (m. 2009)
- Children: 1
- Education: Bachelor of Laws
- Alma mater: MMH College, Gaziabad; Chaudhary Charan Singh University
- Occupation: MLA
- Profession: Politician,Social worker

Sangeeta Yadav is a Bharatiya Janata Party (BJP) politician who has held elected office at both the state and national levels. She represented Chauri-Chaura in the Uttar Pradesh Legislative Assembly from 2017 to 2022 and has represented Uttar Pradesh in the Rajya Sabha since 2022. In August 2026, she was appointed National Secretary of the BJP.

== Early life ==
Yadav was born on July 20, 1981, in Borivali, Mumbai, Maharashtra. In 2009, she married Ajay Kumar. She earned a Bachelor of Law degree from MMH College, Ghaziabad in 2004. Following her education, she was involved in social service and community-oriented activities before entering electoral politics. Her early public engagement was followed by organizational work within the Bharatiya Janata Party and eventually by her election to the Uttar Pradesh Legislative Assembly.

== Political Career ==
=== Uttar Pradesh Legislative Assembly ===
Yadav contested the 2017 Uttar Pradesh Legislative Assembly election as a Bharatiya Janata Party candidate from the Chauri-Chaura constituency in Gorakhpur district.

She was elected to the 17th Uttar Pradesh Legislative Assembly, securing 87,863 votes, or 45.63% of the valid votes polled. She defeated her nearest rival, Samajwadi Party candidate Manorajan Yadav, by 45,660 votes.

Yadav served as the MLA representing Chauri-Chaura from 2017 to 2022. The Uttar Pradesh Legislative Assembly records identify her as a member of the 17th Assembly . In the 2022 Uttar Pradesh Assembly election, the Chauri-Chaura constituency was allocated to the Nishad Party as part of the BJP-led alliance. The BJP subsequently nominated Yadav as a candidate for the Rajya Sabha. Contemporary reporting on her nomination described her as a former Chauri-Chaura MLA and a national secretary of the BJP Mahila Morcha.

=== Rajya Sabha ===
In June 2022, the BJP nominated Yadav as one of its candidates for the Rajya Sabha from Uttar Pradesh. She was subsequently elected unopposed along with the other candidates elected from the state. Her term in the Rajya Sabha began on 5 July 2022. She is serving her first term as a Member of Parliament from Uttar Pradesh.

During her tenure in the Rajya Sabha, Yadav has participated in debates and raised questions on a range of policy and public-interest matters. Her parliamentary interventions have covered subjects including education, women's welfare, employment and skill development, agriculture, environmental policy, technology, rural development and public administration. Among the issues she has raised are the implementation of the National Education Policy 2020, women's participation in science and technology, skill development and apprenticeship, environmental implications of artificial intelligence, natural farming, drinking water, and the economic condition of women associated with self-help groups.

=== BJP organizational work ===
Yadav has held several organizational responsibilities within the Bharatiya Janata Party (BJP), particularly through its women's wing, the Bharatiya Janata Party Mahila Morcha. Her organizational assignments have included responsibilities related to election campaigns, constituency-level programmes and the party's women's wing in Uttar Pradesh and other states.

==== Uttar Pradesh ====
During her organizational work in Uttar Pradesh, Yadav was associated with BJP activities during the Noorpur, Jalalpur and Ghosi by-elections, as well as the Azamgarh Lok Sabha by-election. During the 2019 Lok Sabha elections, she was involved in Mahila Morcha programmes across more than ten Lok Sabha constituencies in the state.

==== Responsibilities outside Uttar Pradesh ====
- Jharkhand: organizational responsibilities during the Bokaro Assembly election.
- Gujarat: served as Mahila Morcha co-in-charge for the Saurashtra region.
- Delhi: served as election in-charge for the Delhi Municipal Corporation elections.
- Karnataka: served as election in-charge for the Ramdurg region during the Assembly elections.
- Telangana: served as Mahila Morcha in-charge during the Assembly elections.
- Haryana: served as Mahila Morcha in-charge during the Assembly elections.
- West Bengal: served as Mahila Morcha in-charge during the Assembly elections.

=== National Secretary of the BJP ===
On 17 August 2026, the BJP announced a new national team under party president Nitin Nabin. Yadav was appointed one of the party's National Secretaries. Her appointment formed part of a wider re-organization of the BJP's national office-bearers. Yadav was among the 16 leaders appointed as National Secretaries in the new organizational team.

== Parliamentary committees ==
During her tenure in the Rajya Sabha, Yadav has served on several parliamentary committees.

Committee	Position
Department-related Parliamentary Standing Committee on Education, Women, Children, Youth and Sports	Member
Committee on Subordinate Legislation	Member
Consultative Committee for the Ministry of Skill Development and Entrepreneurship	Member
Committee on Official Language	Member

Yadav has served on the Department-related Parliamentary Standing Committee on Education, Women, Children, Youth and Sports. She has participated in the committee's proceedings and presented committee reports in the Rajya Sabha. In April 2025, she presented the committee's 365th report concerning the Demands for Grants for 2025–26 pertaining to the Ministry of Women and Child Development.

She was elected to the Committee on Official Language in August 2022.Yadav has also served as a member of the Committee on Subordinate Legislation, which examines subordinate legislation and related matters.

She is a member of the Consultative Committee for the Ministry of Skill Development and Entrepreneurship, which provides a forum for Members of Parliament to engage with the ministry on matters relating to its work and programmes.

== Posts held ==
No.	From	To	Position
01	March 2017	March 2022	Member, 17th Legislative Assembly of Uttar Pradesh
02	June 2021		National Secretary, BJP Mahila Morcha
03	June 2022		Member, Rajya Sabha
04	August 2026		National Secretary, BJP
