= Mallaah =

Traditional boatmen of south Asia

Regions with significant populations
- India • Pakistan
- Bihar: 3,410,093 (2.61% of the population of Bihar)

Languages
- Bhojpuri • Maithili • Hindi • Sindhi • Seraiki

Religion
- Hinduism • Islam

Related ethnic groups
- Kewat • Bind • Nishad

The Mallaah are the traditional boatmen and fishermen tribes or communities found in North India, East India, Northeastern India and Pakistan. A significant number of Mallaah are also found in Nepal and Bangladesh. In the Indian state of Bihar, the term Nishad includes the Mallaah and refers to communities whose traditional occupation centred on rivers. It is also spelled Mallah.

== History ==
The earliest references to these people come from the Hindu scriptures like Ramayana and the Mahabharata. The Mallaah claim to have descended from Veda Vyasa who composed Mahabharata, and was a son of Satyawati. They also claim many other mythological characters like Eklavya and Nishadraja (a leader of the forest tribe who helped lord Rama). A folk etymology has Mallaah as a term used to describe someone who rode a boat from the Arabic word Mallah (ملاح) which means "to move its wing like a bird". However the word is purely an occupational term, which was used for the large community associated with the water centric occupation primarily boating and fishing.

There are many subcastes of the Mallaah community including the Kewat, Bind, Nishad, Dhimak, Karabak, and Sahani. The Mallaah community was recognised as backward caste initially though socially and economically they were much behind the backward castes and were closer to historically marginalized communities. But they are not considered part of the marginalized castes, instead they are Kshatriya since the Mahabharata has mentioned it. Some of the state governments to include them in SC category which was preceded by movement and unrest led by the various caste organisations. Some of the state governments to include them in SC category which was preceded by movement and unrest led by the various caste organisations of the community for the purpose of seeking benefits accruing due to reservation provided to the Scheduled Caste groups.

In the first half of 20th century the rising educated middle class among the community urged for the unification of various subcastes of the larger Mallaah community for the purpose of their socio-economic empowerment. Consequently, in 1918 Nishad Mahasabha came into existence, as the largest organisation of the Mallaahs and their subcastes. The Nishad Mahasabha was spearheaded by Ram Chandr Vakil and Pyarelal Chaudhary, amongst whom the former was selected to legislative council of United Province in 1936 and voiced support for the political representation of Nishad and its subcastes.

The various caste based organisations and the umbrella organisation Nishad Mahasabha sought to mobilise the people belonging to subcastes of Mallaah under a common term called 'Nishad', which symbolised the attempt of the community to discover their past in the mythological heroes whom they considered their progenitors. The attempts of Nishad Sabhas to do so with their Ekta Sammelans and other ways of sensitization and mobilisation of a common member of the community was later spearheaded by political parties based on the ideology of Hindutva.

In 1990s when Lal Krishna Advani was organising his Ram Rath Yatra to garner the support of Hindus all over India for the establishment of Ram Temple at a disputed site in Ayodhya, Mulayam Singh Yadav's government took serious steps to prevent the Karsewaks (volunteers of the Temple movement) in a bid to stop the communal clashes in the state. The proponents of the Ram Temple movement then sought the help of the Nishad community to transport the Karsewaks through water route invoking the tale from Ramayana, when Nishadraja Guhya, a mythological character from the holy epic helped lord Rama to cross the river. According to social historian Badri Narayan Tiwari:

Apart from transporting Karsewaks to Ayodhya, nearly 20,000 Nishad living on the bank of river Saryu and Ghagra also went to Ayodhya to work as volunteers in the construction of Ram Mandir.

The wooing of Mallaah community in 1990s by the Hindutva ideologue was resented by other political parties who mobilised the community through the tale of Eklavya who in his devotion to his Guru Dronacharya sacrificed his finger though earlier he was ill-treated by him and his request for learning archery from him was denied by the Guru because of his low ritual status.

However according to Badri Narayan, the ideology of Ram Rajya, an idyllic time of the past when lower and upper caste lived together in harmony was just invoked to counter the politics of Dalit mobilisation based on the report of Mandal Commission which sought reservation in the government jobs and educational institutions for socially and economically backward communities.

The tussle between the lower and the upper caste hence continued in the decade of 1990 itself when the attempt to mobilise lower castes to support the upper caste dominated politics was taking place. The states like Bihar and Uttar Pradesh were facing severest caste wars in which the lower castes like Mallaah were falling prey to the caste based armies of the upper caste. Amongst all massacres that occur in the rural Bihar in 1990s, the Laxmanpur Bathe, 1997 is the most notable where Ranvir Sena, an upper caste militia slaughtered 56 lower castes including the members of Mallaah community who earlier helped them cross the river being ignorant of their intentions. The Sena members also raped 5 girls who were less than 15 years old.

In states like Uttar Pradesh too, the brutal force of repression upon lower caste was inflicted by the members of upper castes, which were many a times challenged by the iconic people from the lower castes as for example Phoolan Devi, who being born in a Mallaah family faced all sort of discrimination from the upper caste dominated administration after being raped by bandits belonging to Thakur Rajput castes and finally ended up perpetrating the infamous "Behmai massacre", in which male members of a Thakur caste dominated village were assassinated by a gang of Mallaah under the leadership of Phoolan Devi. Devi was later inducted as Member of Parliament from Uttar Pradesh by Mulayam Singh Yadav, who acknowledged her popularity among her castemen.

The Mallaah and their subcastes called Bind were also active in high value organised crime in the Bihar during 1990s. These organised crimes were kidnapping, Timber logging, forcibly taking contract for public works, automobile theft and smuggling which were the prerogative of the criminals belonging to upper castes earlier as they required linkage with the politicians and backup from the ruling regime as high capital inflow is involved. In the regime of Rashtriya Janata Dal led government these criminals from backward castes specially Mallaah and Yadav turned several areas of Bihar into their base and organised high value crimes. The criminal nature of Mallaah were earlier used by British colonialists too to list them in Criminal Tribes Act 1871. Scholars like Buchanan and Crooke also consider this behaviour to be inherent in their nature which halted their attempts to sanskritize and seek high status.

=== Post 2000 ===
The period before 2000 saw consolidation of backward castes under Lalu Prasad Yadav, who according to the backward communities gave voice to them to stand up in front of upper castes. Lalu as a Chief Minister frequently visited the SC hamlets of the state and sensitise the lower caste feeling against repression. This period saw representation of many lower castes including Mallaah in local level politics who now acquired the post of "Mukhia" (village headman) at many places.

The early part of Lalu Yadav's rule saw the rise to prominence of the leaders of the lower castes among which Jai Narain Prasad Nishad was a notable leader from Mallaah community. However, the prominence of Yadavs made many aspirational backward castes dissatisfied, who were forced to seek place in electoral politics elsewhere. The Dalit caste after being marginalised in the Rashtriya Janata Dal thus moved towards the socialist leader Ram Vilas Paswan who championed the cause of the numerically weak backward communities and the dominant Dalit caste, Dusadh. The Mallaah community later supported Nitish Kumar until 2015, when Mukesh Sahani entered the political arena of Bihar. Sahani called himself "Son of Mallaah" and cultivated support amongst the Nishad community, who were electorally influential in some pockets of Bihar. Initially, his campaign for the Bharatiya Janata Party as the leader of Mallaah caste made the community vote in favour of BJP in 2014 elections, but later on he joined the Mahagathbandhan (Bihar), a grand alliance of opposition parties in Bihar which includes Rashtriya Janata Dal and Rashtriya Lok Samata Party among others. The walking out of Sahani led Vikassheel Insaan Party out of National Democratic Alliance was due to alleged betrayal of Bihar government under Nitish Kumar to grant Scheduled Tribe status to Mallaah caste.

=== Distribution in Bihar ===
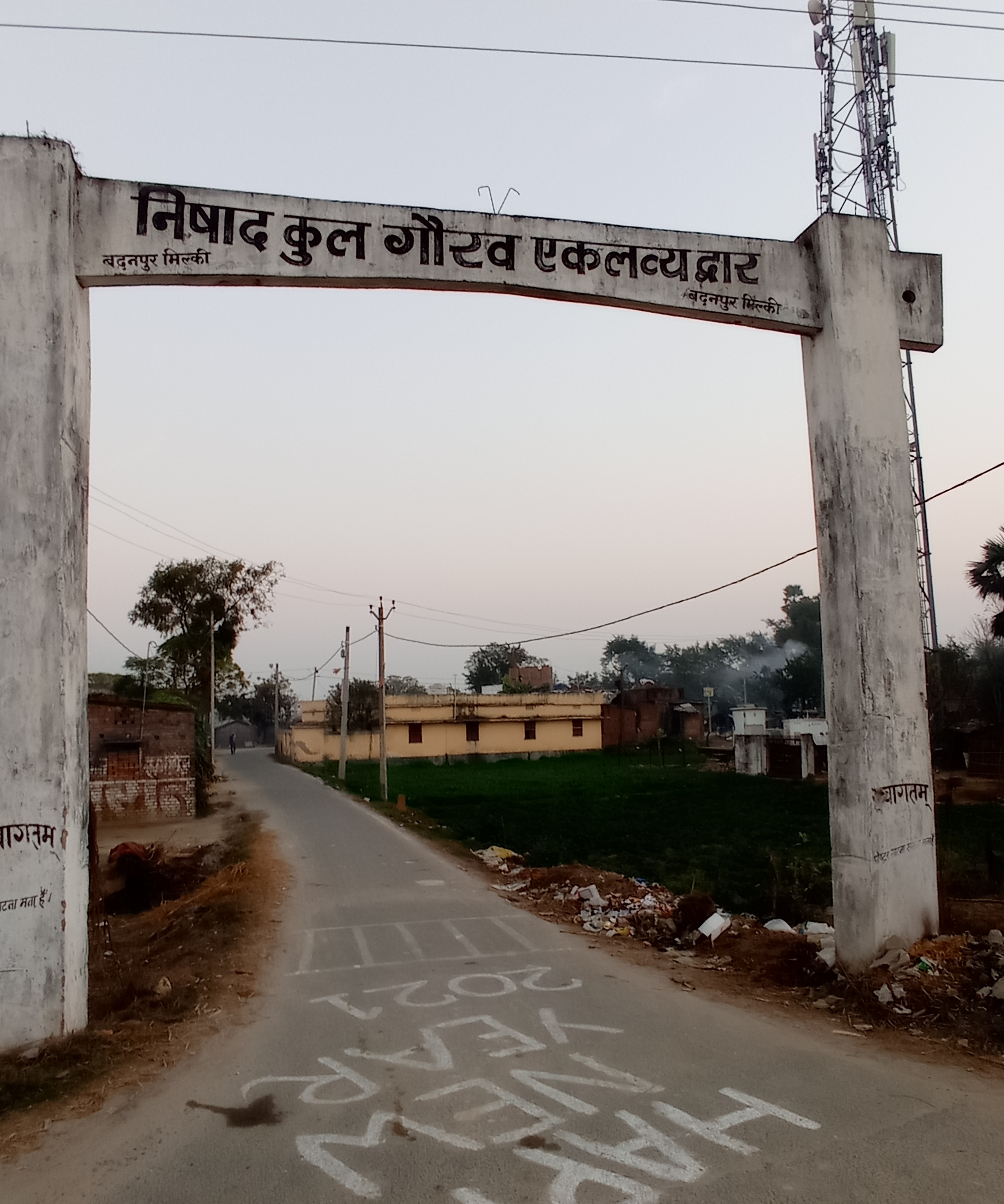
The gateway at the entrance of a Nishad (Mallaah) caste dominated village in Bihar, commemorating Ekalavya, the mythological character from Mahabharata.

The Mallaah community is present all over Bihar though sparingly. They are dominant in districts like Muzaffarpur and Vaishali. In Muzaffarpur region, they have emerged as the most influential caste politically, leaving behind Bhumihar, Rajput, Koeri, Kurmi and Yadav. Since decades the Member of Parliament from this constituency has remained from the Mallaah caste only.

== In Pakistan ==
=== In Sindh ===
In Sindh, the Mallaah are traditionally boatmen and fisherfolk, living along the inlets of the Indus delta. They speak Sindhi, and are close associated with Mohana tribe. The Mallaah are found mainly in the coastal districts of Thatta and Badin, and most are largely still fishermen. Many have seen their traditional areas of habitation washed away by the sea. The Indus Delta is also silting, which makes cultivation difficult. An important subsidiary occupation is animal husbandry, with the Mallaah raising cattle. Although living in close proximity to the Jath community, who customs are similar to the Mallaah, there is almost no intermarriage. The Mallaah community consists of a number of clans, referred to as nukh, the largest Mallaah nukh being the Dablo.

=== In Punjab and Khyber Pakhtunkhwa ===
In Punjab, the boatmen belong either to the Mallaah or Jhabel tribe. In south west Punjab, they often claim themselves to be a clan of Rajputs, and found mainly along the banks of the Indus. They extend as far north as Dera Ismail Khan District of Khyber Pakhtunkhwa, where their settlements are found mainly along the banks of the Indus. In this region, many Mallaah are cultivators, and have given up their occupation as boatmen. They generally combine their specialized occupation of boat management with other occupations such as fishing and the growing of waternuts.

In neighbouring Punjab, the Mallaah are found mainly in the districts of Muzaffargarh, Dera Ghazi Khan, Rajanpur, Uch Sharief and Layyah, and said to be by origin Jhinwar. While Bahawalpur, the Mallaah, Mohana and Jhabel are said to have a common origin, with Mohana being fishermen, the Mallaah being boatmen and Jhabel being cultivators. The Mallaah speak Seraiki, and are entirely Sunni. There are also Mallaah communities in the Hazara Division of Khyber-Pakhtunkhwa. They live along the banks of the Indus in the Haripur and Mansehra districts and speak Hindko.

== Mallaah in Nepal ==
The Central Bureau of Statistics of Nepal classifies the Mallaah (called Mallaha in the Nepal census) as a subgroup within the broader social group of Madheshi Other Caste. At the time of the 2011 Nepal census, 173,261 people (0.7% of the population of Nepal) were Mallaah. The frequency of Mallaahs by province was as follows:

- Madhesh Province (2.3%)
- Lumbini Province (0.7%)
- Koshi Province (0.4%)
- Bagmati Province (0.0%)
- Gandaki Province (0.0%)
- Karnali Province (0.0%)
- Sudurpashchim Province (0.0%)

The frequency of Mallaahs was higher than national average (0.7%) in the following districts:

- Rautahat (2.9%)
- Sarlahi (2.7%)
- Parsa (2.6%)
- Bara (2.5%)
- Siraha (2.5%)
- Saptari (2.1%)
- Rupandehi (2.0%)
- Mahottari (1.4%)
- Dhanusha (1.3%)
- Morang (1.3%)
- Bardiya (1.1%)
- Parasi (0.8%)
