= Sharad Tripathi =

Indian politician (1972–2021)

Member of Parliament, Lok Sabha
- In office 16 May 2014 – 23 May 2019
- Preceded by: Bhishma Shankar Tiwari
- Succeeded by: Praveen Kumar Nishad
- Constituency: Sant Kabir Nagar

Personal details
- Born: 9 January 1972 Gorakhpur, Uttar Pradesh, India
- Died: 30 June 2021 (aged 49) Gurugram, Haryana, India
- Citizenship: India
- Party: Bhartiya Janta Party
- Spouse: Rita Tripathi (m. 1998)
- Children: Nripendra Ram Tripathi Alias Shikhar Ram Tripathi
- Education: Post Graduation, Kanpur University

Sharad Tripathi (9 January 1972 – 30 June 2021) was a member of the Bharatiya Janata Party (BJP) from the state of Uttar Pradesh. He was elected to Lok Sabha from Sant Kabir Nagar constituency in the 2014 general election.

== Education ==
He completed his Post Graduation from Kanpur University in 1995.

== Personal life ==
Tripathi was son of Ramapati Ram Tripathi, former president of the BJP state unit of Uttar Pradesh. He died in 2021, following a lengthy illness. Prime Minister Narendra Modi, Union Home Minister Amit Shah and Uttar Pradesh Chief Minister Yogi Adityanath paid condolences.

== Political career ==
- May 2014: Elected to 16th Lok Sabha
- 1 Sep 2014 onwards: Member, Standing Committee on External Affairs; Member, Consultative Committee, Ministry Of Rural Development, Panchayati Raj and Drinking Water and Sanitation
- 12 June 2017 onwards: Member, House Committee

== Controversies ==
On 6 March 2019, Sharad Tripathi was seen assaulting BJP MLA Rakesh Singh Baghel with his shoe after he discovered that his name was missing from the foundation stone of a new road.

== Death ==
Sharad Tripathi died due to prolonged illness at Medanta hospital in Gurgaon on 30 June 2021.He is survived by wife, two daughters and sons.
