= Syed Zafar Islam =

Indian politician

Member of Parliament, Rajya Sabha
- In office 4 September 2020 – 4 July 2022
- Preceded by: Amar Singh
- Succeeded by: Sangeeta Yadav
- Constituency: Uttar Pradesh

National Spokesperson of Bharatiya Janata Party
- Incumbent
- Assumed office 2014

Personal details
- Born: Hazaribagh, Jharkhand, India
- Party: Bharatiya Janata Party
- Spouse: Shiba Kamal
- Children: 2
- Education: Delhi University (PhD), IIM Ahmedabad (MBA), Aligarh Muslim University, Ranchi University
- Occupation: Investment Banker, politician

Syed Zafar Islam is an Indian Politician and former Member of Parliament in the Rajya Sabha from the state of Uttar Pradesh. He is currently one of the national spokespersons of the Bharatiya Janata Party. Islam is a former investment banker and the former Managing director of the Indian subsidiary of Deutsche Bank. He is regarded as one of the prominent Muslim leaders of the party.

He also served as a non-official independent director for Air India from 2017 to 2020.

== Political career ==
=== Entry into politics ===
Syed Zafar Islam was influenced by Narendra Modi's politics and joined the Bharatiya Janata Party (BJP) on 5 April 2014 after resigning as director of Deutsche Bank, India . He was made the National Spokesperson of the party. In 2017, he was appointed as a non-official independent director of Air India by the Appointments Committee of the Cabinet. A close friend of Jyotiraditya Scindia, Zafar is believed to have help Scindia shift to the BJP from the congress in 2020 and topple the elected Madhya Pradesh Congress government of Kamal Nath. He also writes opinion pieces on politics and economic affairs in several national newspapers.

=== Member of Parliament ===
In the 2020 by-polls, he was elected unopposed to the vacant Rajya Sabha seat from Uttar Pradesh. BJP did not nominate Zafar in 2022 for another term and thus his term ended and he bid farewell to his Rajya Sabha seat.

== See also ==
- Bharatiya Janata Party
- List of Rajya Sabha members from Uttar Pradesh
