= Chauri-Chaura Assembly constituency =

Constituency of the Uttar Pradesh legislative assembly in India

Coordinates: 26.65°N 83.59°E

Chauri-Chaura
- Constituency No. 326 for the Uttar Pradesh Legislative Assembly

Constituency details
- Country: India
- Region: North India
- State: Uttar Pradesh
- District: Gorakhpur
- Total electors: 3,39,854 (2017)
- Reservation: None

Member of Legislative Assembly
- 18th Uttar Pradesh Legislative Assembly
- Incumbent Sarvan Kumar Nishad
- Party: Bharatiya Janta Party
- Elected year: 2022

Chauri-Chaura is a constituency of the Uttar Pradesh Legislative Assembly in the town of Chauri Chaura in the Gorakhpur district of Uttar Pradesh, India.

Chauri-Chaura is one of five assembly constituencies in the Bansgaon Lok Sabha constituency. Since 2008, this assembly constituency is numbered 326 amongst 403 constituencies.

== Members of the Legislative Assembly ==
Year	Member	Party
Till 2012 : Constituency did not exist
2012	Jai Prakash Nishad	Bahujan Samaj Party
2017	Sangeeta Yadav	Bharatiya Janata Party
2022	Sarvan Nishad	Bharatiya Janata Party

== Election results ==
=== 2027 ===
2027 Uttar Pradesh Legislative Assembly election: Chauri-Chaura
Party	Candidate	Votes	%	±%
SP	Ajay Kumar Singh			
NDA				
BSP				
NOTA	None of the above			
Majority				
Turnout				
gain from		Swing		

=== 2022 ===
2022 Uttar Pradesh Legislative Assembly election:
Party	Candidate	Votes	%	±%
BJP	Sarvan Kumar Nishad	91,958	44.65	▼0.7
SP	Brijesh Chandra Lal	50,831	24.68	▲2.89
IND	Ajay Kumar Singh	29,582	14.36	
BSP	Virendra	25,077	12.18	▼7.17
NOTA	None of the above	1,214	0.59	▼0.01
Majority		41,127	19.97	▼3.59
Turnout		205,952	57.99	▲0.99
BJP hold		Swing		

=== 2017 ===
Bharatiya Janta Party candidate Sangeeta Yadav, won in last Assembly election of 2017 Uttar Pradesh Legislative Elections defeating Samajwadi Party candidate Manurojan Yadav by a margin of 45,660 votes.

2017 Uttar Pradesh Legislative Assembly election: Chauri-Chaura
Party	Candidate	Votes	%	±%
BJP	Sangeeta Yadav	87,863	45.35	
SP	Manurojan Yadav	42,203	21.79	
BSP	Jay Prakash Nishad	37,478	19.35	
NISHAD	Ishwar Chand	13,048	6.74	
NCP	Dudhnath Kewat	2,045	1.06	
NOTA	None of the above	1,150	0.6	
Majority		45,660	23.56	
Turnout		193,724	57.0	
BJP gain from BSP		Swing	▲16.35	

=== 2012 ===
2012 Uttar Pradesh Legislative Assembly election: Chauri-Chaura
Party	Candidate	Votes	%	±%
BSP	Jay Prakash Nishad	49,687	29.28	Steady
SP	Anoop Kumar Pandey	29,086	17.14	Steady
BJP	Vinay Kumar Singh	22,515	13.27	Steady
SBSP	Nilesh	10,620	6.26	Steady
PECP	Hari Lal	9,438	5.56	Steady
Majority		20,601	12.13	Steady
Turnout		1,69,696	53.56	Steady
BSP win (new seat)				
