= Rakesh Singh Baghel =

Indian politician

MLA in 17th Legislative Assembly of Uttar Pradesh
- In office March 2017 – March 2022
- Preceded by: Laxmikant
- Succeeded by: Anil Kumar Tripathi
- Constituency: Menhdawal (Assembly constituency)

Personal details
- Born: 13 February 1967 (age 59) Bakhira, Sant Kabir Nagar, Uttar Pradesh, India
- Party: Bharatiya Janata Party
- Parent: Mukund Singh Baghel
- Education: Diploma in Civil Engineering
- Alma mater: Government Polytechnic Gorakhpur
- Occupation: MLA

Rakesh Singh Baghel is an Indian politician and a member of the Bharatiya Janata Party. He was a member of 17th Legislative Assembly of Uttar Pradesh of India representing the Menhdawal assembly in Sant Kabir Nagar district of Uttar Pradesh. He was not made a candidate in the 2022 Uttar Pradesh Legislative Assembly election as BJP gave Menhdawal constituency to its National Democratic Alliance partner NISHAD Party.

== Early life and education ==
Baghel was born 13 February 1967 in Bakhira village in Sant Kabir Nagar district of Uttar Pradesh to father Mukund Singh. In 1994, he married Sheela Singh, they have one son and two daughters. In 1990, he attended Government Polytechnic Gorakhpur and attained degree of Diploma (Civil Engineering).

== Political career ==
Baghel started his journey of politics in 16th Legislative Assembly of Uttar Pradesh (2012) elections. He got ticket of Bharatiya Janata Party from Menhdawal (Assembly constituency), but he lost to Laxmikant (Samajwadi Party) and came fourth with 30,525 (14.71%) votes.

In 17th Legislative Assembly of Uttar Pradesh (2017) elections, he again contested from Menhdawal and won this seat by defeating Bahujan Samaj Party candidate Anil Kumar Tripathi by a margin of 42,914 (19.09%) votes.

== Controversies ==
In March 2019, BJP MP Sharad Tripathi thrashed BJP MLA Rakesh Singh Baghel with his shoes after he discovered that his name was missing from foundation stone of a new road in presence of district BJP's incharge Ashutosh Tandan.

== Posts held ==
#	From	To	Position	Comments
01	March 2017	March 2022	Member, 17th Legislative Assembly of Uttar Pradesh	
