= Gyanpur Assembly constituency =

Constituency of the Uttar Pradesh legislative assembly in India

Coordinates: 25.33°N 82.47°E

Gyanpur
- Constituency No. 393 for the Uttar Pradesh Legislative Assembly

Constituency details
- Country: India
- Region: North India
- State: Uttar Pradesh
- District: Bhadohi
- Total electors: 3,90,971
- Reservation: None

Member of Legislative Assembly
- 18th Uttar Pradesh Legislative Assembly
- Incumbent Vipul Dubey
- Party: NISHAD
- Alliance: NDA
- Elected year: 2022

Gyanpur is a constituency of the Uttar Pradesh Legislative Assembly covering the city of Gyanpur in the Bhadohi district of Uttar Pradesh, India.

Gyanpur is one of five assembly constituencies in the Bhadohi Lok Sabha constituency. Since 2008, this assembly constituency is numbered 393 amongst 403 constituencies.

== Members of the Legislative Assembly ==
Year	Member	Party
1957	Bechan Ram Gupta	Indian National Congress
1962	Harigain Ram	Indian National Congress
1967	Muralidhar	Bharatiya Jana Sangh
1969	Banshidhar Pandey	Indian National Congress
1974	Ramrati Bind	Bharatiya Kranti Dal
1977	Shyamdhar Mishra	Indian National Congress
1980	Bridhi Narain	Indian National Congress (I)
1985	Sharda Prasad Bind	Indian National Congress
1989	Ramrati Bind	Janata Dal
1991	Lalchand Pandey	Bharatiya Janata Party
1993	Ram Kishor Bind	Bahujan Samaj Party
1996	Gorakh Nath Pandey	Bharatiya Janata Party
2002	Vijay Mishra	Samajwadi Party
2007	Vijay Mishra	Samajwadi Party
2012	Vijay Mishra	Samajwadi Party
2017	Vijay Mishra	NISHAD Party
2022	Vipul Dubey	NISHAD Party

== Election results ==
=== 2027 ===
2027 Uttar Pradesh Legislative Assembly election: Gyanpur
Party	Candidate	Votes	%	±%
INDIA				
NDA				
BSP				
NOTA	None of the above			
Majority				
Turnout				
gain from		Swing		

=== 2022 ===
NISHAD Party member Vipul Dubey won in the 2022 Uttar Pradesh Legislative Assembly election, defeating Samajwadi Party candidate, Ram Kishore Bind, by a margin of 6231 votes.

2022 Uttar Pradesh Legislative Assembly election: Gyanpur
Party	Candidate	Votes	%	±%
NISHAD	Vipul Dubey	73,446	34.12	+2.31
SP	Ram Kishore Bind	67,215	31.23	+12.46
Pragatisheel Manav Samaj Party	Vijay Mishra	34,985	16.25	+15.84
BSP	Upendra Kumar Singh	30,753	14.29	−6.93
NOTA	None of the above	2,469	1.15	+0.65
Majority		6,231	2.89	−6.8
Turnout		215,254	55.06	−1.69
NISHAD hold		Swing		

=== 2017 ===
NISHAD Party member Vijay Mishra won in the 2017 state assembly elections defeating Bharatiya Janta Party candidate Mahendra Kumar Bind by a margin of 20,230 votes.

2017 Uttar Pradesh Legislative Assembly Election: Gyanpu
Party	Candidate	Votes	%	±%
NISHAD	Vijay Mishra	66,448	31.81	
BJP	Mahendra Kumar Bind	46,218	22.12	
BSP	Rajesh Kumar Yadav	44,319	21.22	
SP	Ramrati Bind	39,205	18.77	
NOTA	None of the above	1,034	0.5	
Majority		20,230	9.69	
Turnout		208,900	56.75	
