= Mohana (community) =

Sindhi indigenous ancient community

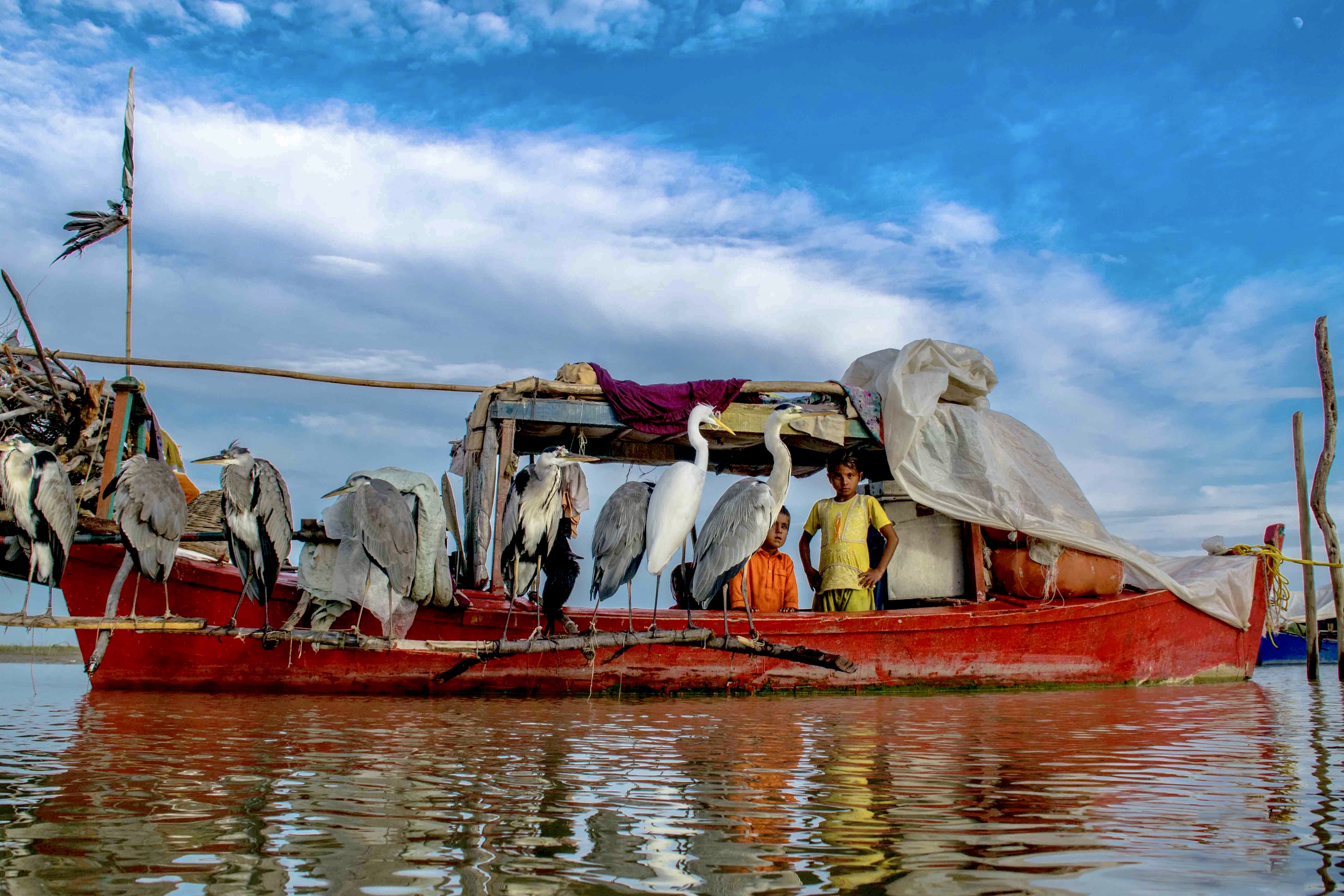
Mohana people on boathouse.

The Mohana (Sindhi: مُوهاڻا), Mohano (singular) (Sindhi: موهاڻو) or Mallah, Mirbahar, Mirani, Med and Gandra (ملاح، میربحر، میراڻی), is an ancient fishermen community of Sindhi people who live in the coastal Pakistani areas of Sindh and Balochistan.

== Background ==
The word Mohana is probably derived from the Sanskrit word Mukha + tana (sthana) meaning people living at mouth of the Indus river, it is possible that the origin of Mohana or Mallah is from Meluha people, the word which people of Mesopotamian civilization used for people of Indus valley civilization.

== Culture ==
They often refer to themselves as "Mir Bahar" (meaning lord of the sea). They are mostly Sunni Muslims and speak the Sindhi language.

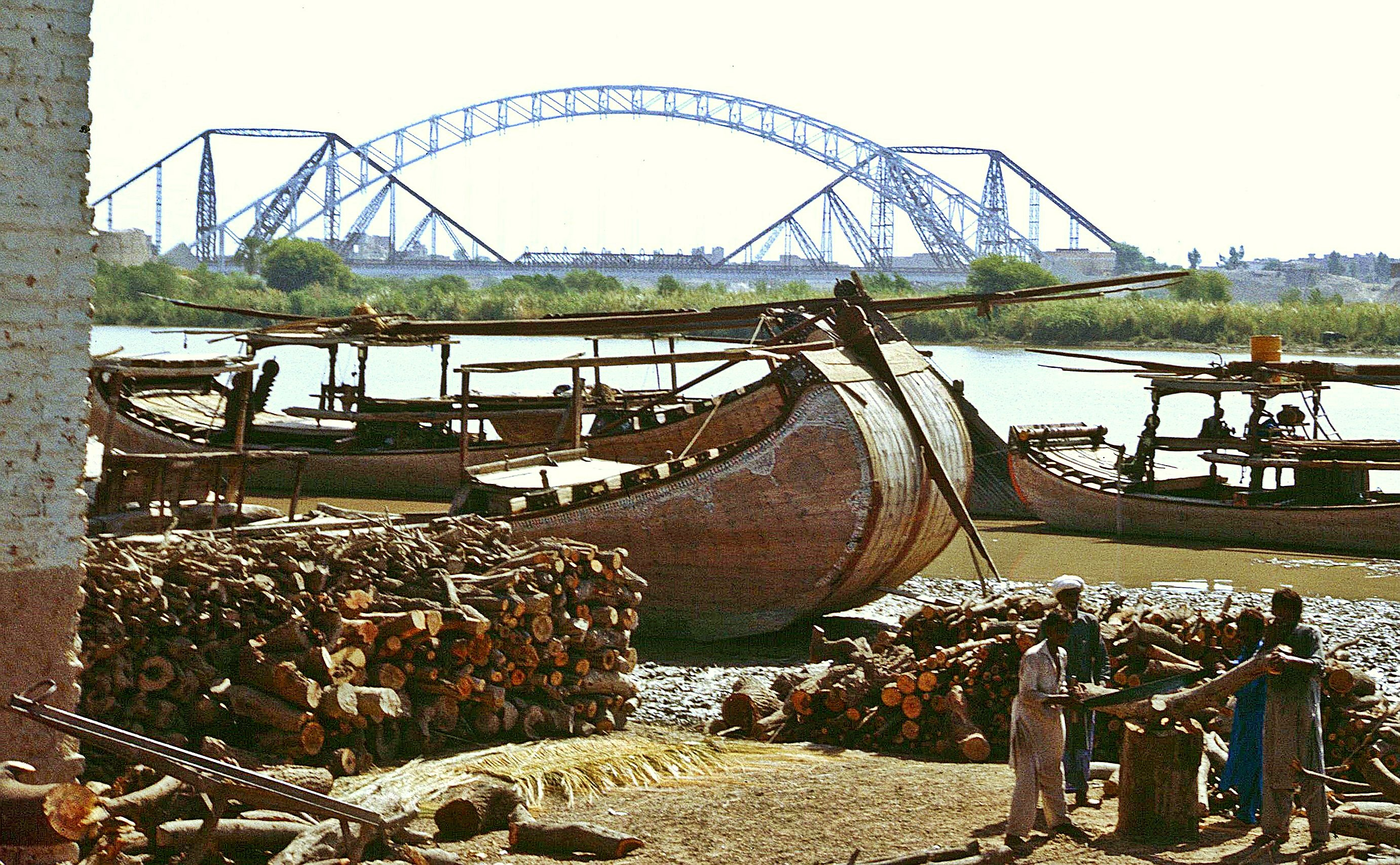
Traditional Sindhi handmade wooden boats with carvings and Ivory or elephant tooth designs and mirrors, made and used by Mohanas.

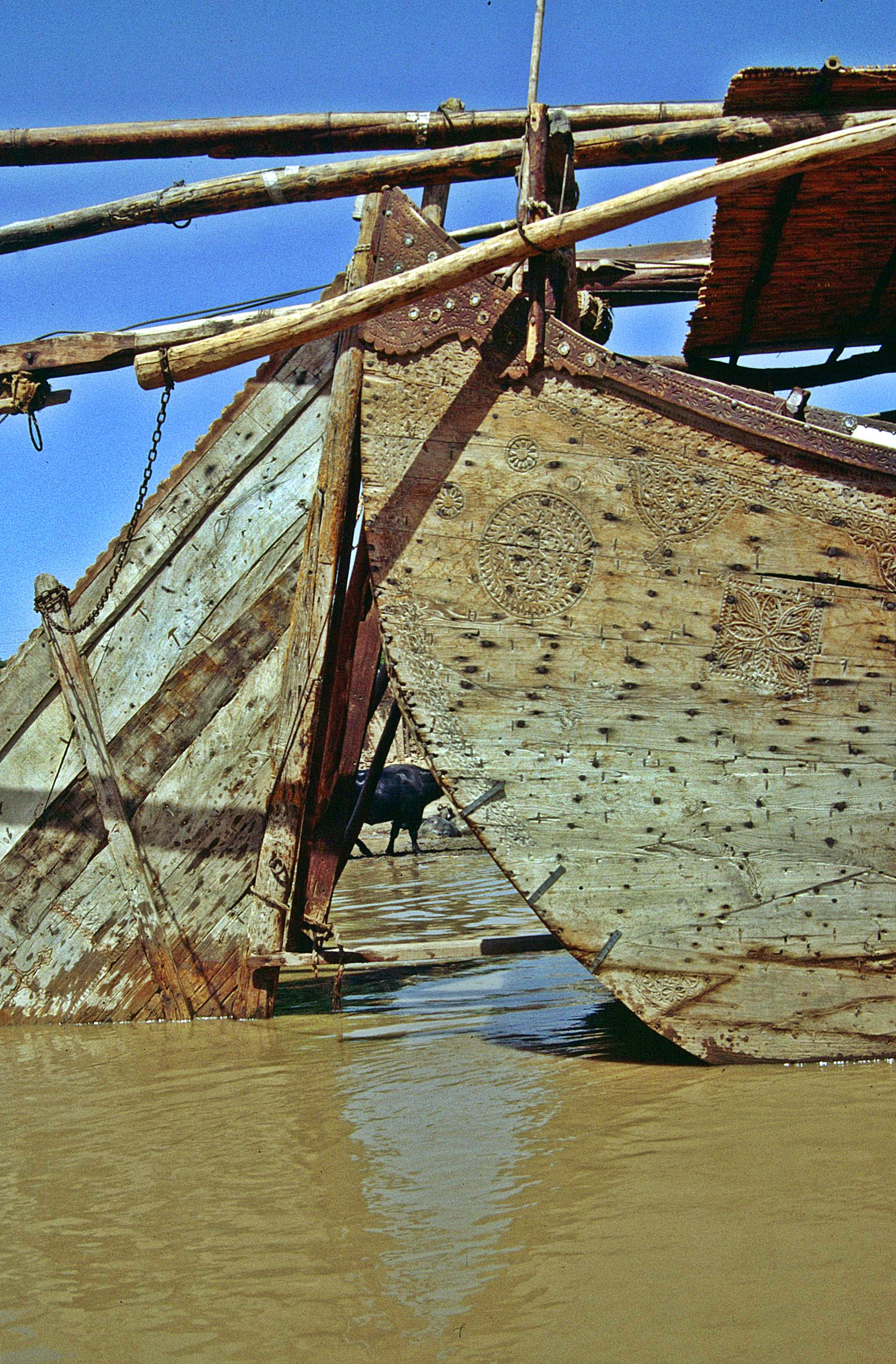
Close look on the carvings and mirrorwork on the Sindhi boats.

The Mohana are known for living on houseboats in the centre of Lake Manchar, entire families and communities subsisting off of the lake’s bounty of fish. They obtain these fish not only via traditional methods (such as nets or fishing rods) but through the use of trained birds, utilising cormorants and night herons; the birds are kept as companions in the houseboats and benefit from the excess fish caught by their human caretakers. In addition to Lake Manchar, populations of Mohana reside along Pakistan’s southern coast, as well as in Karachi, Thatta, and Keti Bandar.

The traditional way of life has been under threat for decades. The exclusive fishing rights which were granted to them by the government were removed with the creation of Pakistan, causing many of them to become dependent as workers for the fishing contractors who subsequently outbid them in auctions for those rights. Regional water shortages and the construction of dams along the Indus River have also significantly impeded their lifestyle, which is so centred on that river that attempts to resettle them elsewhere in the 1970s failed.

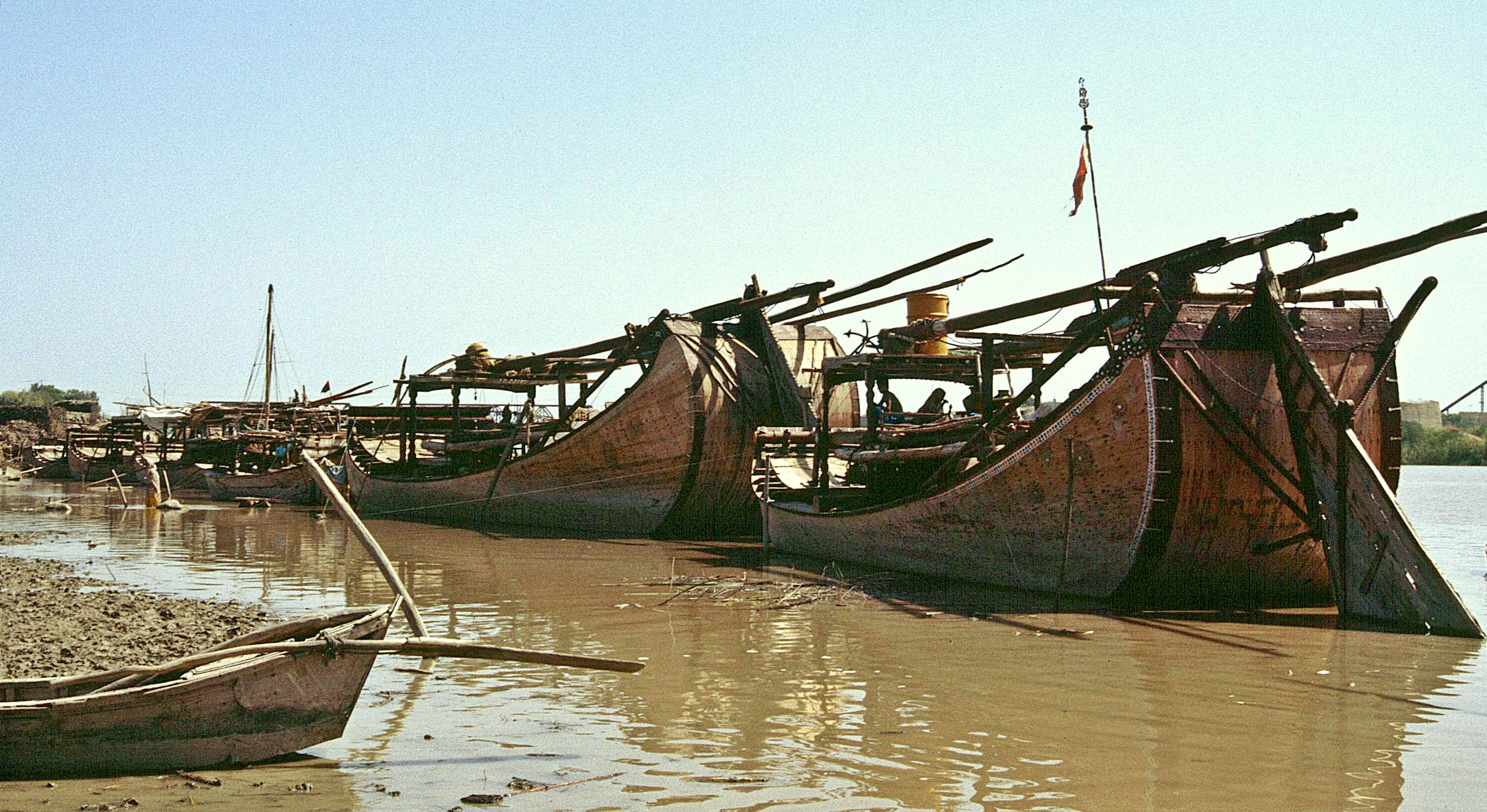
Sindhi Mohana boats.

== Sub-tribes and clans ==
Ārabi, Ābrani, Ātha, Āthla, Ajaya, Āqebani, Ābdani, Ātlani, Āmar, Āseeli, Ādmani, Abrani, Ablani, Abwani, Antāh, Barera, Bagia, Baghia, Bugho, Bogwa, Bohar, Bachrai, Budhar, Budhrani, Bandhāni, Balhara, Bhadla, Bharkani, Bilhāra, Buhrio, Charejo, Chālko, Chhul, Chator, Chechi, Chhijni, Chagda, Chanban, Chandani, Chawār, Chobutt, Chodha, Chichro, Cheenjri, Chhābai, Chhābrani, Chhāgani, Chhāga, Chhaja, Chhojani, Chharejo, Chhurihar, Chhagra, Chhalangar, Chhanadi, Chholani, Chhetia, Dabherani, Daryai, Dareen, Darba, Daphrani, Dagba, Dulla, Dullasia, Damal, Dumecha, Dunagona, Dundh/Dundar, Dundan, Dungh, Dar, Daeria, Depar, Dhandhal, Dhandhia, Dhapāli, Dhachar, Dharba, Dhagan, Dhama, Dhamach, Dhundhi, Dhanero, Dhangrach, Dhordhota, Dhordhaya, Dhokai, Dhokar, Dholia, Dheraj, Dāgha, Dāndani, Dachar, Darha, Dakhena, Danda, Dawāch, Dawakar, Dobal, Dahail, Daoochar, Desi, Deya, Daga, Dethar, Dedhra, Dagh, Dull, Dhandhan, Dhanag, Dhodhan, Doki, Dhondha, Dhondhan, Dhongejo, Dhahar, Dhahia, Dhaho, Dhara, Dhāgai, Dhāmran, Dhāngra, Dhagri, Dhorai, Dhuhara, Enami, Gādejani, Gādāi, Gāndar, Gāngar, Gajāria, Gajeria, Gujria, Gago, Gadbadki, Gada, Gudani, Gudhani, Gar, Gur, Garara, Garano, Geriyani, Gugera, Gaghar, Gulam, Galh, Galero, Galih, Guna/Gana, Ganbani, Ganbwani, Gandara, Ganjlani, Ganjan, Gundal, Gangar, Gutta, Gotar, Godai, Godo, Goghat, Gehee, Geerana, Gail, Gaind, Gāhoya, Gabhir, Gachla, Gakhar, Guliya, Gumora, Gorachani, Gorah, Goraho, Gorahi, Gorhi, Gahar, Gayar, Ghaha, Ghāghra, Ghāgham, Ghata, Ghacha, Gharana, Gharai, Ghalrio, Ghalejo, Ghana, Ghotano, Ghoghra, Ghoghāt, Ghoghat, Ghaighlani, Hākar, Hālti, Hadia, Hadoro, Hull, Hamthai, Hodai, Horai, Haboja, Hussainani, Jakhria, Jākhria, Jākhrai, Jānjahan, Jānwani, Jagrani, Jumāri, Jhinjhiwa, Jandān, Jangahi, Jobāniya, Jorr, Jogra, Jonani, Joniya, Jahazi, Jeesrani, Jāriko, Jamgori, Jabera/Jhabair/Jhabail, Jata, Jajoha, Jarrah (ڄَڙَھَ), Janai, Jorani, Jhābar, Jhāgoro, Jhānjhar, Jhānjhra, Jhāngan, Jhaber, Jhabra, Jhabair, Jhapla, Jhugur, Jhagia, Jhaljai, Jhandeer, Jahol, Kātar, Kāteria, Kāthyara, Karejo, Kārera, Kārrha, Kāsera, Kāndeel, Kāngo, Kānoyra, Kānhera, Kāniora, Kubra, Kathor, Kottiya, Kudai, Kadhan, Kerudhi/Khettai, Karolai, Kasar, Kasanb, Kaseera, Kaka (ڪَڪَا), Kamalu, Kamwani, Kanada, Kenada, Kanand, Kanuboya, Kunjan, Kanchani, Kandro, Kandal, Kandrah, Kandria, Kandhani, Kinrani, Kango, Kungo, Kangtia, Kanghai, Kania, Kutro/Qutro, Kochāria, Kod, Konia, Kahrani, Kahrejo, Kahia, Kerana, Kerat, Khārai, Khārtti, Khārechh, Khāmria/Kodario, Khanecha, Khaburani, Khatha, Khathrai, Khada, Khudai, Khadaya, Khadejo, Kharkar, Khargi, Kheryatt, Khanbhera, Khanbhria, Khanjijo, Khopra, Khodera, Kholur, Khonjāna, Khora, Khachar, Khachari, Khadtara, Khadecha, Lābri, Lārra, Lākhyari, Lāndir, Lathro, Lathria, Lattan, Lajar, Lur, Larai, Larhani, Lakhteer, Lalla, Lalia, Lora, Lori, Loljo, Lonthia, Lonk, Lonia, Lahna, Layara, Liyara, Liyarani, Liyarpotra, Mādo, Med, Mārai, Māshki, Mākera, Mākhra, Māggar, Mānjaria, Māndh, Māndi, Māngri, Māngriani, Māhujo, Matila/Mitila, Machhara, Machhar, Muchhra, Machhera, Maradparia (Paria, Kāngri), Margar, Margal, Marhai, Marhi, Misrik, Mushri, Muashi, Mugra, Magi, Magia, Malhār, Malhāna, Manjwani, Manjhwani, Manchhra, Manchhri, Manchhori, Mingrah, Munghan, Manghwani, Motani, Motan, Motanpotra, Moraj, Moorjo, Morakh, Mosāwi, Mogra, Mundar, Mungar, Moaira, Maha, Mirgani, Miranpuri, Nāpar, Nāch, Nāriani, Nāhar, Noonkata, Nuharia, Nihani, Naheria, Obhara, Phadrani, Phurhar, Phulia, Phatti, Phottani, Phodna, Phoreyat, Pātni, Pāraji, Pār'ri, Pārhiri, Pāredi, Pāresi, Pārehar, Pālki, Pālkia, Pāhiri, Pubia, Pabar, Patujo, Pata, Papar, Parbat, Pakhyar, Pakhra, Pakhira, Pakhrio, Palwani, Palidai, Panjra, Pinyar, Poprai, Pophani, Peesak, Peekra, Qasimpotra, Qādrani, Raa, Rāhwani, Rahukro, Rahejo, Rakhnani, Rasha, Rakhia, Ramani, Ropāya, Rodh, Rodhia, Roonjh, Ruwenjha, Rono, Rahbar, Rahria, Reesar, Relani, Sathyani, Saati, Saad, Sārha, Sāsia, Sāgrani, Sālāt, Sānbhal, Sānjhijo, Sāndan, Sāndani, Sāndh, Sāndhano, Sāndhani, Sāng, Sāngra, Sāngi, Sāngri, Sāicho, Sabhupotra, Suthera, Sapra, Sapria, Supria, Suriya, Sasar, Saikna, Sukhrejo, Sakhero, Samghan, Samote, Sanjani, Sanjhujo, Sangāsi, Sodhani, Sodhai, Sorai, Sora, Sonra, Sunhara, Saikhra, Shahpuria, Shakarkhalai, Shero, Shāer, Sheliani, Shinhara, Safrani, Sandrani, Sobha, Sahijo, Tahrani, Taibani, Taibiani, Taloi, Tanra, Tohia, Thamiwer, Thaimoor, Tatro, Tāndani, Tāndai, Tāndio, Tendio, Tanko, Tangar, Tangarr, Toba, Topiani, Torri, Toha, Toya, Tebari, Tebai, Tebhar, Tetar, Terra, Tetihar, Teenkha, Teemtha, Teengiani, Thenga, Thengia, Thengira, Uplano, Udan, Wātni, Wāghri, Wāghrio, Wāghiri, Wālhoto, Wāhujo, Wāhundani, Wadhani, Wadhejo, Wadākh, Wadahra, Wadehra, Wadhria, Wadho, Warer, Wirak, Wasana, Waso, Walāsia, Walhari, Walhia, Walejo, Wiharo, Wahurea, Waij, Weijh, Wayasra, Wayasrani, Wayasrio, Waiga, Zahedi, Zahāra, and Zahro, etc.
