= Laxmikant Nishad =

Indian politician

Member of Parliament, Lok Sabha
- Incumbent
- Assumed office 4 June 2024
- Preceded by: Praveen Kumar Nishad
- Constituency: Sant Kabir Nagar

Minister of State (Independent Charge) for Fertilizers and Logistics: Government of Uttar Pradesh
- In office 2012–2017

Member of Uttar Pradesh Legislative Assembly
- In office 2012–2017
- Preceded by: Abdul Kalam
- Succeeded by: Rakesh Singh Baghel
- Constituency: Menhdawal

Personal details
- Party: Samajwadi Party
- Parent: Satai (father)
- Occupation: Agriculture

Laxmikant Nishad also known as Pappu Nishad is an Indian politician from the Samajwadi Party. He was the Minister of State for Fertilizers and Logistics with independent charge in Akhilesh Yadav's Uttar Pradesh Government and a member of the Uttar Pradesh Legislative Assembly from 2012 to 2017.
