= Praveen Kumar Nishad =

Member of the Lok Sabha

Member of Parliament, Lok Sabha
- In office 23 May 2019 – 4 June 2024
- Preceded by: Sharad Tripathi
- Succeeded by: Laxmikant (Pappu Nishad)
- Constituency: Sant Kabir Nagar
- In office 14 March 2018 – 23 May 2019
- Preceded by: Yogi Adityanath
- Succeeded by: Ravi Kishan
- Constituency: Gorakhpur

Personal details
- Born: 19 February 1989 (age 37) Campierganj, Uttar Pradesh, India
- Party: Bharatiya Janata Party (2019–present); NISHAD (2019–present)
- Other political affiliations: Samajwadi Party (2018–2019)
- Parent: Sanjay Nishad (father)
- Education: Gautam Buddh Technical University, Lucknow

Praveen Kumar Nishad (born 19 February 1989) is an Indian politician and a member of Bharatiya Janata Party. He was a member of Lok Sabha from Sant Kabir Nagar, Uttar Pradesh in 2019 elections. He is the son of Sanjay Nishad, founder of the NISHAD Party. He is an engineer with a degree from Gautam Buddh Technical University, Lucknow.

For the 2018 by-elections to Phulpur and Gorakhpur Lok Sabha seats, Samajwadi Party tied up with a number of smaller parties, including Nishad Party to extend its social base beyond Yadavs and Muslims. Praveen Kumar Nishad was selected as the Samajwadi candidate in Gorakhpur, where the Nishad community is the second largest demographic group. In a major upset, Praveen Nishad wrested the seat from BJP, which had not lost the seat since 1989. The victory margin was 21,000 votes. One year later, he joined BJP, and was elected to Lok Sabha in 2019 from Sant Kabir Nagar seat.

Lok Sabha
Preceded by Yogi Adityanath	Member of Parliament for Gorakhpur; 2018 – Present	Incumbent
