= Nishad =

Hindu caste

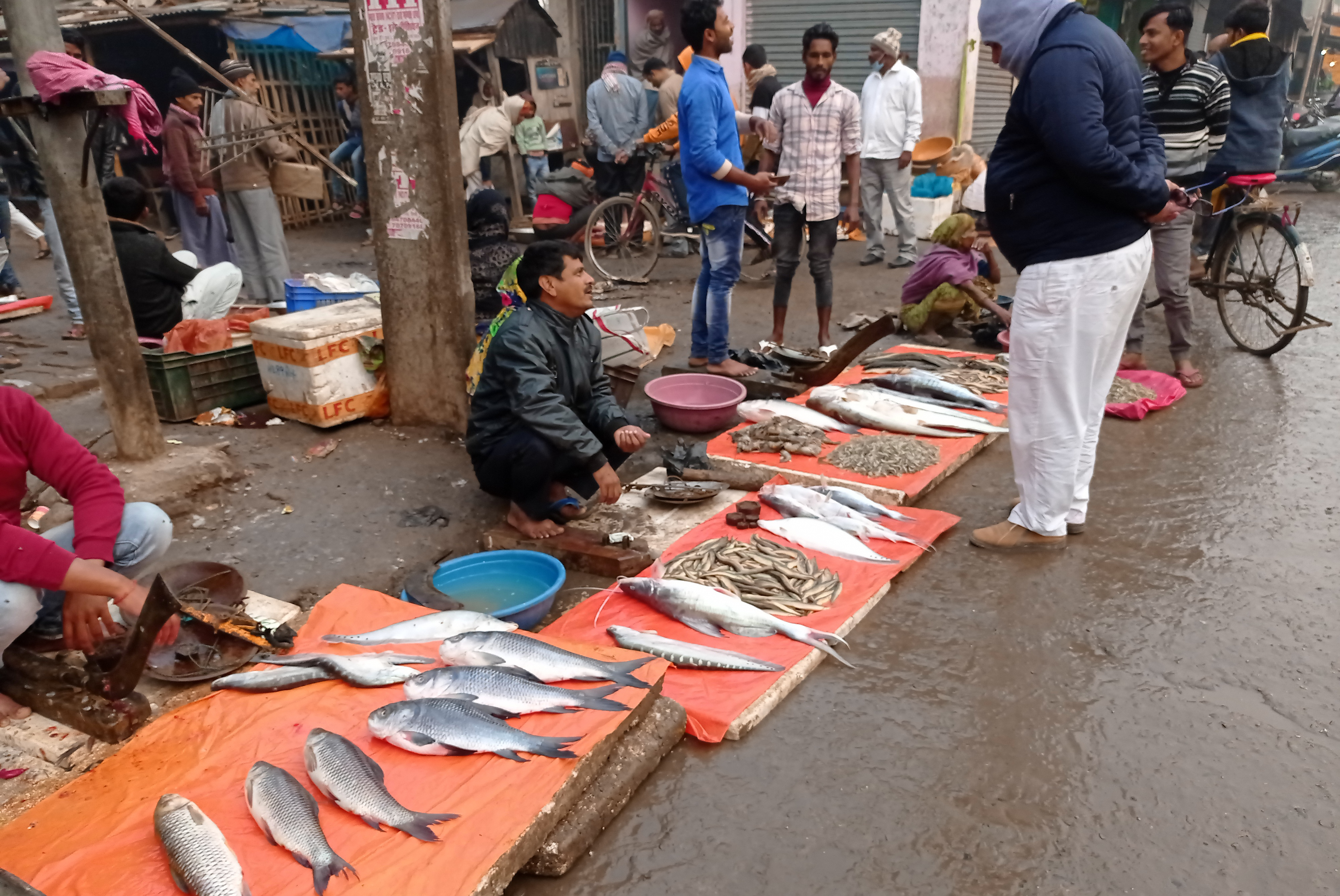
- A Nishad man at a local fish market, Bihar (2020).

Regions with significant populations
- • India

Languages
- Hindi, Bhojpuri

Religion
- • Hinduism

Related ethnic groups
- • Kewat • Bind • Beldar

The Nishad are a Hindu caste, found in the Indian states of Bihar and Uttar Pradesh. In Bihar, the term refers to a group of around 20 communities whose traditional occupations centre on rivers, such as the Mallaah. There have been demands for these communities to be reclassified from Other Backwards Classes (OBC) to Scheduled Tribes.

In Uttar Pradesh, the term "Nishad" represents 17 OBC communities that have been proposed for Scheduled Caste status by the Samajwadi Party-controlled Government of Uttar Pradesh. However, this proposal, which relates to votebank politics and has been made in the past, has been stayed by the courts; a prior attempt was also rejected by the Government of India.

== Formation of Nishad identity ==
Nishads, according to Badri Narayan is a term denoting various communities whose traditional occupations has remained water-centric including sand dredging, Boating and Fishing. Since 1930s various caste organisation claiming to represent these communities started holding conferences with the central aim of uniting all these communities under the umbrella term "Nishad". Earlier these communities were classified as "Most Backward Caste", but in socio-economic status they were more close to Scheduled Castes. The organisation like Rashtriya Nishad Sangh, Shri ramasakha guhraj nishad seva samiti dholpur (Raj.), Nishad Kalyan Sabha, Maharaja Nishadraj Guhya Smarak Samiti were some of the organisation based in Uttar Pradesh which are hosting numerous Ekta Rally (unity conferences) to unify these caste groups.

In 2001, the writer E.S.D Bind argued that various subcaste of Nishad community together comprises 18% of the population of Uttar Pradesh, which were instrumental in affecting the electoral politics of the state. As a result, various political parties pitched for having a share of this large vote bank by manipulating the legends of mythical heroes of the community in a way to suit their agenda. This process became more swift after the publication of a pamphlet called Nishad Jati Sankhya Bal in a magazine called Nishad Jyoti. One of the earliest proponent of Nishad identity was Ram Chandr Vakil who was elected as a member of United Province legislative council in 1936. In the later years, the push to this identity politics was given by various political parties which included Samajwadi Party, Bahujan Samaj Party and Bhartiya Janata Party.

=== Origin ===
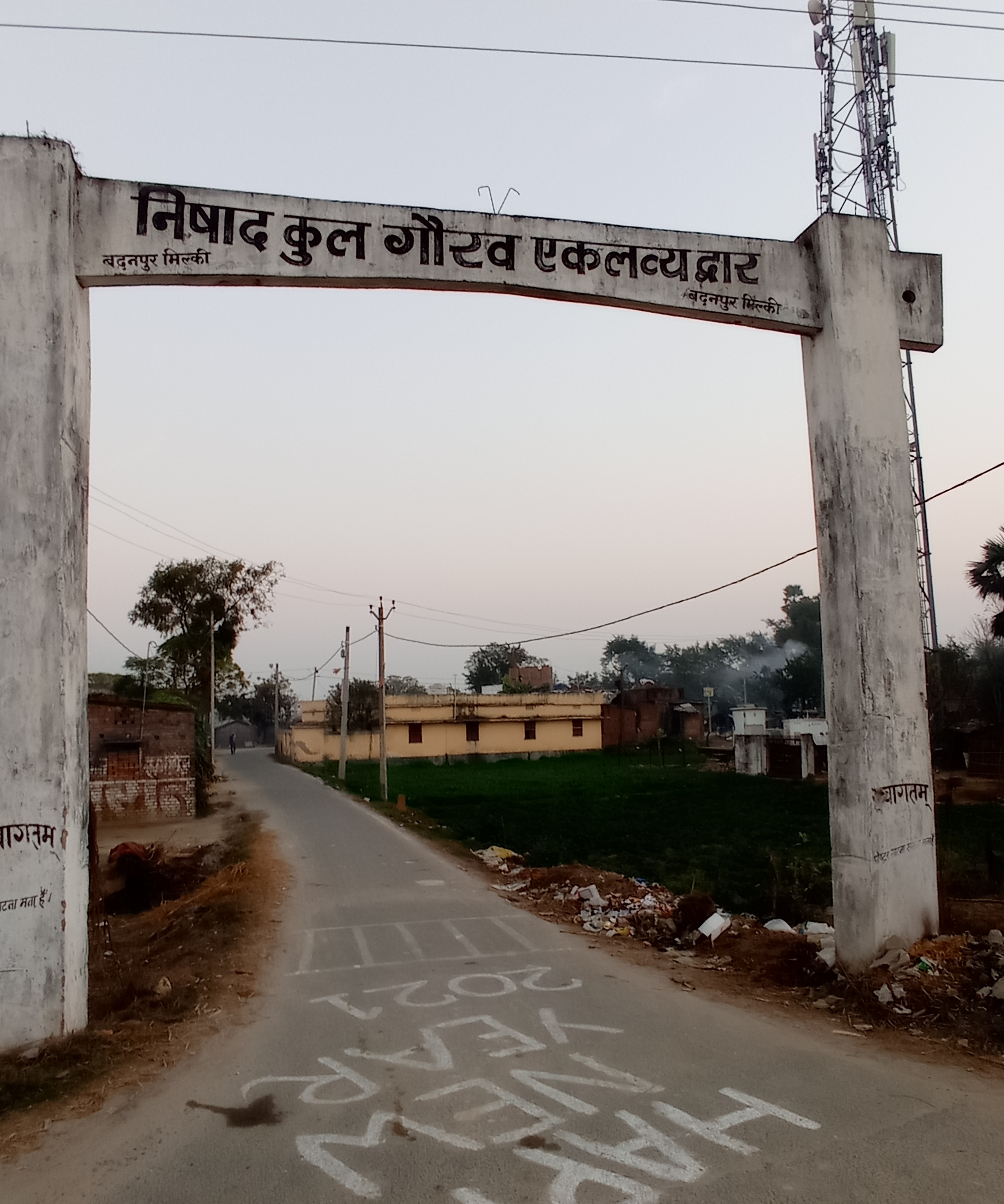
The gateway at the entrance of a Nishad (Mallaah) caste dominated village in Bihar, commemorating Eklavya, the mythological character from Mahabharata.

Magazines such as Nishad Jyoti and Jheel Putra Smarika claimed that before the advent of Aryans in Indian subcontinent, there was a well developed kingdom of Nishads, which was fortified. These claims sought to recognise them as one of the earliest inhabitants of the subcontinent. Some of these magazines also claimed that, [they] were forefathers of Indus Valley civilization. In a bid to strengthen their claim, the various organisation affiliated to the Nishad community quoted the scholars such as Hall, Keith and William Crooke as well as scriptures like Rig Veda to prove that there used to be a well developed civilization before the advent of Aryans which had trade links to the rest of the world and Nishad were the founder of Ganga River Culture.

The genealogy made by the Nishads declares them to be the descendants of Nishadraj Guhya who befriended Rama when he was exiled from the Ayodhya. Their Gaurav Gathas or tales of glory features Maharishi Kalu (Guru of Narada), Nala, Damayanti, Matasyagandha as well as Ved Vyas (the composer of epic Mahabharata) as members of Nishad caste. In order to claim Nishadraj as their forefather they refer to a passage from Ramcharitmanas which says:

"Uttari thari bhae sursarireta
Siya Ram Guhya Lakhan Sameta"
(Disembarking from the boat, on the sand of Ganga
stood Sita and Ram with Guhya and Laxman.)

Besides claiming the mythological character Eklavya as a member of Nishad community, they also associate themselves with Bhai Himmat Rai Dheewar, one of the member of Panj Pyare, the five associates of Guru Govind Singh.

These legends were popularised by the Arya Samajists too who wanted to bring more and more castes within Brahmanical fold. The caste histories connected them to Rama through Nishadraj and popularised various Brahmanical rituals among them to form a meta Puranic Hindu identity. Some of the Mallaah also worship Gauriya Baba, a folk hero who according to popular belief primarily belonged to the Dusadh caste but protected the people from Mallaah, Dhanuk and even Rajput caste from the Mughal onslaught and forcible conversions. According to the beliefs he used to bury a pig's head in front of his house which was situated at the entry of the village. Since the pig were anathema for the Muslims, they did not dare to enter these villages. He also rode up and down at the entry of his village and fought Mughal soldiers. Consequently, some of the Mallaahs started worshipping him as their family god.

=== Classification as Criminal Tribe ===
The association with the term Nishad had a positive connotation for various boatmen and fishermen caste who attempted to get registered as Nishad in 1921 census. This Sanskritizing attempt could not rule out the criminal reputation of Mallaah and other water centric communities which formed the basis for classification in colonial census. The British authorities developed two sets of rule or categories to classify various caste groups, first being those of martial race and other one being Criminal Tribes Act. According to Metcalf, the census exercise further rigidified the caste status and caste mobility was made unchangeable. The classification of some of the low caste (who were considered as uncivil) in one of the aforementioned category could lead to exclusion of whole community from government jobs including military, police and administrative services. In census 1931, Mallaah and its subcaste were tabulated as recalcitrant and people in need of domestication. The diverse occupations of the sub-castes of Nishad community were standardized and they were perceived as people thriving on boating and fishing only.

The process of equating caste with occupation was though considered as misleading now, as by the late 19th century the Mallaah and its sub-castes were moving towards cities and were getting employed as labourers in the burgeoning weaving industry. But, this distinction between caste and occupation hardly changed the stance of the authorities, for whom Mallaah were already perceived as criminals. According to Bernstein who documented the introduction of steamboat on the Ganges, the control of river's navigational route was very important for the British colonizers for transport of raw materials and revenue proceeds from the countrysides to urban centres. The classification as Criminal Tribes helped them to track the movement of these boatmen who were made to produce a detail of their caste, patrilineal descent, and residence or else were made to pay fine.

For the purpose of having a seamless river transport system to fulfill their commercial motives, the British recruited a number of boatman who were placed at important spots along the rivers. This policy had both social and economic implication for the Nishad community members who would leave their homes for long period of time to work under East India Company as wage labourers, transporting their riches.

=== Retriever of corpses ===
Mallaah all across Ganges are known for their capabilities of diving deep underwater for an extended period of time. This ability is used up by the regional authorities of many river front cities who use them as retriever of corpses. The unique capability to hold the breath for a long period of time in search of coins inside the rivers (throwing coin in river is considered as a popular belief in Hinduism) makes them capable to perform this arduous task perfectly. The "diving for coins" is not considered as legal occupation by the states which leads to harassment of people involved in it by the authorities. As a response to it at many places like Raj Ghat in Varanasi the "coin divers" have set up formal association with organizational structure to protect themselves from being harassed. The underwater capabilities of these people are often used in dangerous resque missions. The Mallaah also prefer Alcoholism which they claim as the best way to keep their body temperature stable inside the water and keeping themselves psychologically prepared for the extreme situations.

=== Changing colonial perception ===
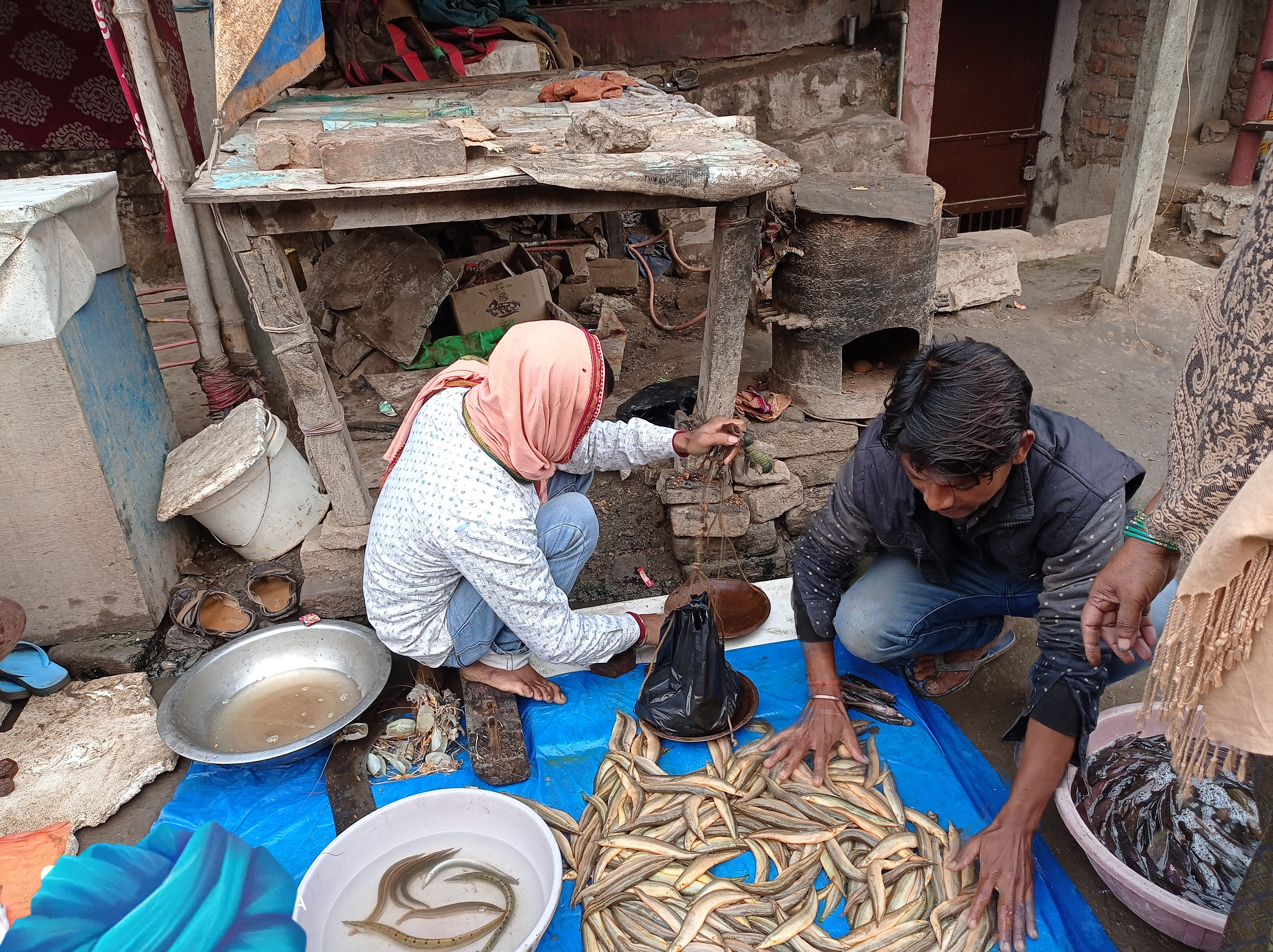
Mallaah people in a local fish market (Bihar) 2020

In the recent years, due to frequent contact with the politicians and journalists, the boatmen community has increasingly become aware of the problem of river pollution and challenges to biodiversity of the Ganges due to contamination by point and non point sources. Various organizations affiliated with the Nishad community are now engaged in awareness generation for the conservation of riverine ecosystem. The organisation such as Rashtriya Nishad Jagran Mahasabha have released pamphlets declaring the Nishad community as the protector of sacred water bodies. These magazines and pamphlets have helped to arise consciousness among the water centric communities to come forward for the cause of environment by invoking caste solidarity. The slogans raised by these caste associations like:

Maa Ganga Ki sewa ab Mallah krega (Mallaah will perform the service for mother Ganga)

and increased collaboration with the state for river cleansing projects with devotive motives have challenged the James Scott's notion of "public transcript". At one end the boatmen comply with the things to ensure how the dominant groups would want the things to appear, at the other hand they are also rising voices of resistance without being branded as violators of law.

=== In the period of passive egalitarianism ===
In the 1990s, with the rise of Lalu Prasad Yadav in Bihar, de-elitizing of politics took place which made it an affair of masses, specially the lower castes. The crime and politics went hand in hand during this period, because in order to gain the support of his backward caste followers, Lalu did not hesitated in extending supports to OBCs, even if they went against law. This period witnessed the least number of police firing and public-police clash. In those circumstances the Bind, one of the community which are part of larger Nishad community and Yadavs turned several areas of Bihar into their crime capitals. They replaced the upper caste gangsters in high value organized crimes like automobile theft, Timber logging, Kidnapping, smuggling and contract killing. The strategic use of violence by the OBCs, and illegality along with patronage to criminals in politics broke upper caste dominance not only in politics but also in day-to-day affairs of the lower castes. The middle class, the upper caste criticised the breaking down of the tradition of liberal democracy while the OBCs supported the status-quo as the erstwhile system did not ensure them freedom and dignity even after four decades of independence.

== Identity politics in Uttar Pradesh ==
By 1990, many political parties of Uttar Pradesh started supporting the campaign of Nishad community to commemorate their ideals like Nishadraj and Eklavya. These small organisation organized Shobha Yatras and also built small statues of their folk heroes in parts of Uttar Pradesh. The legend of Nishadraj was manipulated more proactively by the Bharatiya Janata Party which urged the Nishads as the rightful heir of the Nishadraj to ferry the BJP in the elections as did Nishadraj for lord Rama. The BJP according to social historian Badri Narayan connected Rama to Nishadraj because the party chose Rama as its icon and Nishadraj could be easily associated with him which could have reaped the votes of large community comprising numerous sub-castes of this water centric community.

The other political parties also stepped into this fray and chose the other heroes who symbolised the victory of lower castes on the upper castes to manipulate the votes of Nishads. The Samajwadi Party which relied upon the votes of middle peasant castes like Yadavs and Patels found the one in Phoolan Devi, a bandit who had been symbolised as the might of the downtrodden people over the upper castes. Phoolan who was raped by the other bandits belonging to the Thakur caste perpetrated the Behmai massacre in retaliation. After she surrendered, the state government under Mulayam Singh Yadav ensured her release and also gave her ticket from the Mirzapur constituency as the Samajwadi Party candidate. This made a section of Nishad obliged to SP, who voted for it.

The Bahujan Samaj Party which symbolised the Dalits, thus started associating itself with Eklavya, another folk hero of the community who being highly talented was discriminated by a Brahmin guru. Since the BJP was looked upon as the party of upper castes, BSP got a counter to the Nishadraj Guhya and to the BJP. During the tenure of Mayawati a stadium was built at Agra, which was named after Eklavya while the local committees of her party also erected numerous statues of Eklavya in various parts of the Uttar Pradesh. Despite the attempts of the political parties whose core base remained the "lower caste ", BJP also remained successful in getting support from a large chunk of Nishad community who were successfully exhorted by the party in the name of Rama. It was reported that when Mulayam Singh Yadav government stopped the volunteers of the Ram Temple movement from reaching Agra through the land route, Nishads were compelled to transport as many as 50,000 volunteers through river route across Ghaghara. The BJP also harnessed the service of 50,000 Nishads who went to Ayodhya as volunteers to participate in Ram Temple movement.

== In popular culture ==
In 2020 "Nishad", a character in the movie Article 15 was played by Mohammed Zeeshan Ayyub which was said to be inspired by the founder of Bhim Army, Chandrashekhar Azad Ravan. The said character was portrayed fighting for the rights of Dalits through an organisation called Bhim Sangharsh Samiti.

== See also ==
- Nishad (surname)
