= NISHAD =

Nishad Party
- Leader: Sanjay Nishad
- Lok Sabha Leader: Pravin Nishad
- Founded: 16 August 2016; 10 years ago
- Youth wing: Nishad Raj Youth
- Ideology: Nishads Interest
- Political position: Centre-left
- Colours: Maroon
- ECI status: registered unrecognized party
- Alliance: National Democratic Alliance (2019–present); SP+ (2018–2019)
- Seats in Uttar Pradesh Vidhan Sabha: 6 / 403
- Seats in Uttar Pradesh Vidhan Parishad: 1 / 100

Election symbol
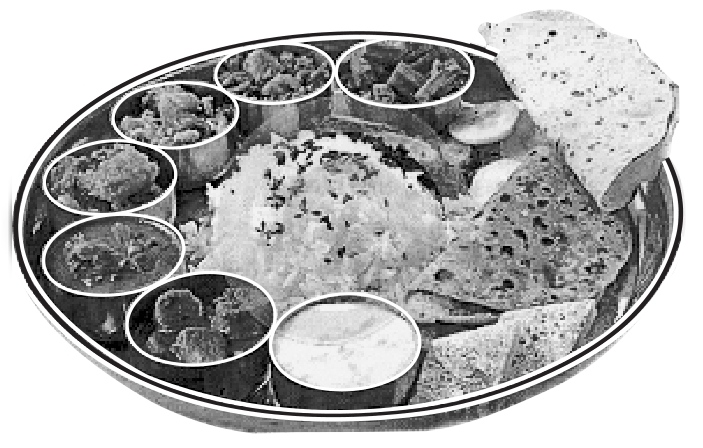
- Bhojan Ki Thali

Website
- nishadparty.com

Nirbal Indian Shoshit Hamara Aam Dal is a political party in India. It was founded on 16 August 2016. The party was formed for empowerment of Nishad, Kewats, Bind, Beldar, Mallah, Sahani, Kashyap, and Gondi communities whose traditional occupations centred on rivers, such as boatmen or fishermen. Its founder, Sanjay Nishad, is a former member of the Bahujan Samaj Party (BSP). According to Nishad, a separate party representing these communities was essential as they had played an integral role in the victories of BSP and Samajwadi Party.

The Nishad Party nominated 100 candidates in various constituencies in the 2017 Uttar Pradesh Legislative Assembly election in alliance with Peace Party of India, the Apna Dal and the Jan Adhikar Party. In the election swept by the BJP, the NISHAD party won only the Gyanpur constituency. Party leader Sanjay Nishad came third in Gorakhpur Rural, polling 35,000 votes, against 83,686 votes by the winner Bipin Singh.

For the 2018 by-elections to Phulpur and Gorakhpur Lok Sabha seats, Samajwadi Party united with several smaller parties, including Nishad Party, to extend its social base beyond Yadavs and Muslims. Sanjay Nishad's son, Praveen Kumar Nishad was selected as the Samajwadi candidate in Gorakhpur, where the Nishad community is the second-largest demographic group. In a major upset, Praveen Nishad wrested the seat from BJP, which had not lost the seat since 1989. The victory margin was 21,000 votes.

Nishad party contested the 2022 UP State Election in alliance with BJP and won six seats.

== Assembly Elections ==
Vidhan Sabha Term	UP Elections	Seats contested	Seats won	% of votes	Party Votes	Ref
Uttar Pradesh Legislative Assembly
17th Vidhan Sabha	2017	72	1 / 403	0.70%	9,30,785	
18th Vidhan Sabha	2022	17	6 / 403	0.91%	8,40,584	

== 2022 ==
2022 Uttar Pradesh Legislative Assembly election: Majhawan
Party	Candidate	Votes	%	±%
NISHAD	Vinod Kumar Bind	103,235	42.07	
SP	Rohit Shukla	69,648	28.38	
BSP	Pusplata Bind	52,990	21.59	
INC	Shiv Shanker Chaudhary	3,399	1.39	
NOTA	None of the Above	2,746	1.12	
AAP	Prakash Chand Tripathi	2,361	0.96	
Majority		33,587	13.69	
Turnout		2,45,391		
NISHAD gain from BJP		Swing		

== Election results ==
=== 2022 ===
NISHAD Party member Vipul Dubey won in the 2022 Uttar Pradesh Legislative Assembly election, defeating Samajwadi Party candidate, Ram Kishore Bind, by a margin of 6231 votes.

2022 Uttar Pradesh Legislative Assembly election: Gyanpur
Party	Candidate	Votes	%	±%
NISHAD	Vipul Dubey	73,446	34.12	
SP	Ram Kishore Bind	67215	31.23	
